= List of awards and nominations received by NCT =

NCT awards and nominations
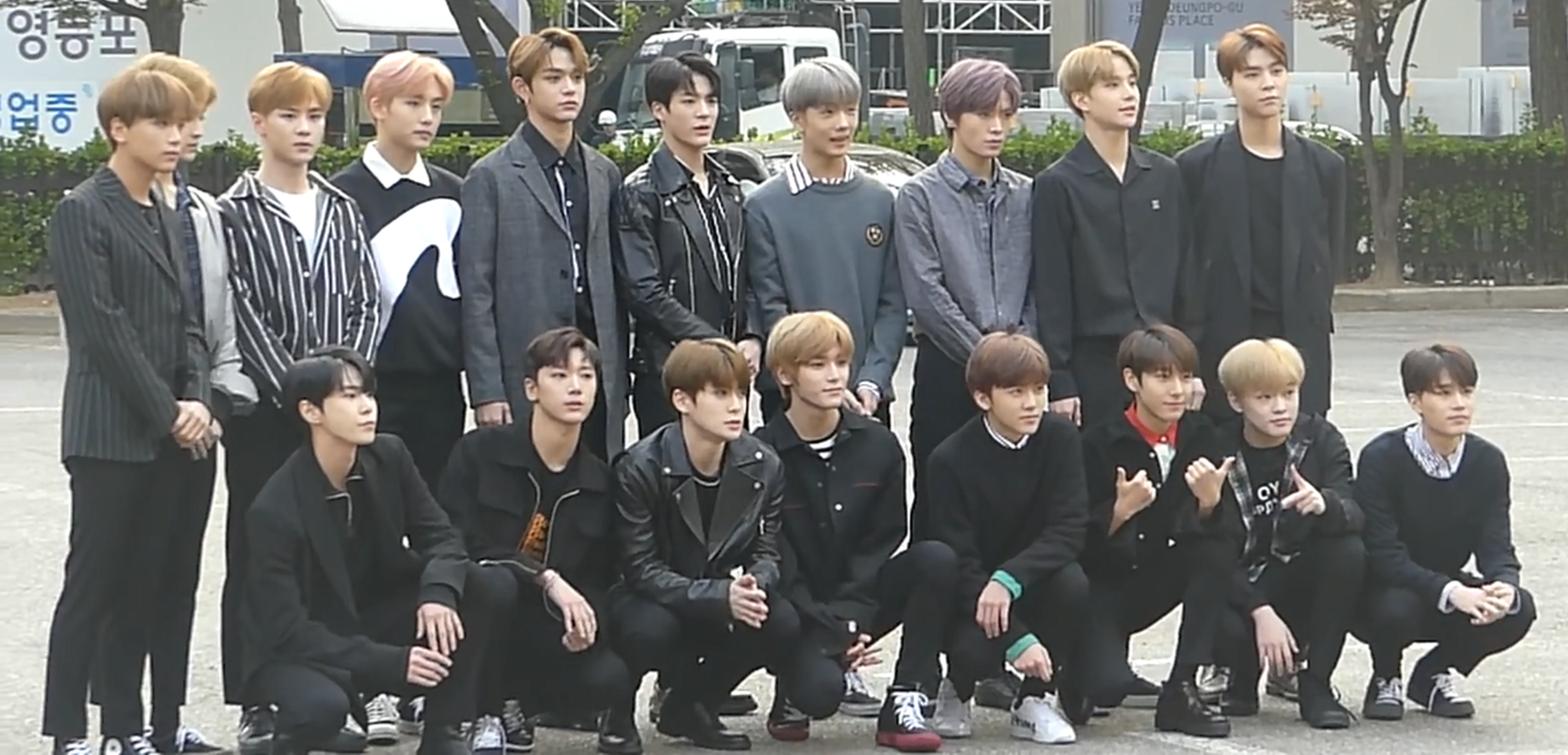
- NCT in April 2018
Awards and nominations
Award	Wins	Nominations
American Music Awards	0	1
APAN Music Awards	3	7
Asia Artist Awards	10	19
Asia Model Award	1	1
Asian Pop Music Awards	12	17
Asia Star Entertainer Awards	1	1
Brand Customer Loyalty Awards	1	2
Bravo Otto	0	2
Circle Chart Music Awards	12	35
D Awards	2	3
The Fact Music Awards	4	8
Genie Music Awards	2	8
Golden Disc Awards	15	45
Hanteo Music Awards	9	9
iHeartRadio Music Awards	0	3
Indonesian Television Awards	1	1
K-Global Heart Dream Awards	2	2
Korea-China Management Awards	1	1
Korea First Brand Awards	2	2
Korea Grand Music Awards	2	18
Korea Popular Music Awards	1	1
Korean Culture Entertainment Awards	1	1
Korean Entertainment Arts Award	4	4
Korean Music Awards	0	1
MAMA Awards	11	50
Melon Music Awards	8	32
MTV Europe Music Awards	0	1
MTV MIAW Awards	0	2
MTV Video Music Awards	0	3
Nickelodeon Mexico Kids' Choice Awards	0	1
Seoul Music Awards	15	51
Sohu Fashion Festival	0	1
Soompi Awards	2	2
Soribada Best K-Music Awards	5	8
Teen Choice Awards	0	2
TMElive International Music Awards	1	1
V Chart Awards	3	3
V Live Awards	2	4

Totals (Note: Certain award groups do not simply award one winner. They acknowledge several different recipients, have runners-up, and have third place. Since this is a specific recognition and is different from losing an award, runner-up mentions are considered wins in this award tally. For simplification and to avoid errors, each award in this list has been presumed to have had a prior nomination.)
- Wins: 133
- Nominations: 355

NCT is a twenty-four member South Korean boy group under record label SM Entertainment, consisting of five sub-units: NCT U, NCT 127 (Johnny, Taeyong, Yuta, Doyoung, Jaehyun, Jungwoo and Haechan), NCT Dream (Renjun, Jeno, Haechan, Jaemin, Chenle and Jisung), WayV (Kun, Ten, Winwin, Xiaojun, Hendery and Yangyang), and NCT Wish (Sion, Riku, Yushi, Jaehee, Ryo, and Sakuya). In 2016, NCT U debuted with the digital singles "The 7th Sense" and "Without You", which didn't gain immediate commercial success. However, “The 7th Sense” received attention from music critics for its unpredictability and uniqueness, with the platform Melon putting it a number 50 on its list “Top 100 K-pop Songs of All Time”. NCT 127's debut extended play NCT #127 and their following EP Limitless won them several new artist awards during late 2016 to early 2017, including at the 26th Seoul Music Awards and at the 6th Gaon Chart Music Awards. NCT #127 also earned them a nomination for Disc Bonsang (Note: A bonsang (Korean: 본상), which translates to "main prize", is a major award given at a South Korean award ceremony.) at the 31st Golden Disc Awards. NCT Dream's debut digital single “Chewing Gum” and their subsequent single album The First received positive commercial reception.

With the release of their third EP Cherry Bomb, NCT 127 received various nominations, including for Album of the Year at the 8th Gaon Chart Music Awards, for the second quarter, while the lead single of the same name received nominations for Best Pop Song at the 14th Korean Music Awards and for Best Dance Performance — Male Group at the 2018 Mnet Asian Music Awards. NCT Dream's second EP We Go Up earned them a nomination for Album of the Year at the 9th Gaon Chart Music Awards, for the third quarter. NCT 127's first studio album Regular-Irregular won the group a Disc Bonsang at the 33rd Golden Disc Awards and a Bonsang Award at the 28th Seoul Music Awards . WayV's debut single album The Vision won them Best New Asian Artist at the 2019 Mnet Asian Music Awards. NCT Dream's third EP We Boom won them a Disc Bonsang at the 34th Golden Disc Awards and a Bonsang Award at the 29th Seoul Music Awards.

NCT 127's second studio album Neo Zone earned them various nominations, including for Album of the Year at the 2020 Melon Music Awards, while the album's lead single "Kick It" received a nomination for Best Dance Performance at the 2020 Mnet Asian Music Awards. NCT Dream's lead single for their fourth EP Reload, "Ridin", earned them a nomination for Best Dance Male at the 2020 Melon Music Awards. NCT Dream's first studio album Hot Sauce was commercially successful and won both Best Album Award at the 31st Seoul Music Awards and Album of the Year – 2nd Quarter at the 11th Gaon Chart Music Awards. NCT 127's third studio album Sticker won the group their first Daesang (Note: A daesang (Korean: 대상), which translates to "grand prize", is the highest honor given out at South Korean music award ceremonies in recognition of the artist(s) with the greatest physical and digital achievements for the year.) award from a major award show at the 31st Seoul Music Awards and Album of the Year – 4th Quarter at the 11th Gaon Chart Music Awards. NCT Dream won the Daesang in 2023 and 2024 at the Seoul Music Awards. Overall, NCT has earned a total of ten daesangs across their units.

== Awards and nominations ==
Award ceremony	Year	Recipient	Category	Nominee/work	Result	Ref.
American Music Awards	2020	NCT 127	Favorite Social Artist	NCT 127	Nominated	
APAN Music Awards	2020	NCT	Idol Champ Global Pick – Group	NCT	Nominated	
APAN Music Awards	2020	NCT	Idol Champ Fan's Pick – Group	NCT	Nominated	
APAN Music Awards	2020	NCT	KT Seezn Star Award – Singer	NCT	Nominated	
APAN Music Awards	2020	NCT U	Best Icon	NCT U	Won	
APAN Music Awards	2020	NCT 127	Best Performance	NCT 127	Nominated	
APAN Music Awards	2020	NCT 127	Represent Artist of this Year	NCT 127	Won	
APAN Music Awards	2020	NCT 127	Top 10 (Bonsang)	NCT 127	Won	
Asia Artist Awards	2016	NCT	Popularity Award – Singer	NCT	Nominated	
Asia Artist Awards	2016	NCT 127	Rookie of the Year	NCT 127	Won	
Asia Artist Awards	2018	NCT	Popularity Award – Singer	NCT	Nominated	
Asia Artist Awards	2020	NCT	Album of the Year (Daesang)	NCT 2020 Resonance Pt. 1	Won	
Asia Artist Awards	2020	NCT 127	Best Artist Award – Music	NCT 127	Won	
Asia Artist Awards	2020	NCT Dream	Best Emotive Award – Music	NCT Dream	Won	
Asia Artist Awards	2020	WayV	Asia Celebrity Award – Music	WayV	Won	
Asia Artist Awards	2021	NCT 127	Album of the Year (Daesang)	Sticker	Won	
Asia Artist Awards	2021	NCT 127	U+IdolLive Popularity Award – Male Group	NCT 127	Nominated	
Asia Artist Awards	2021	NCT 127	AAA Japan Popularity Award – Idol Group (Male)	NCT 127	Nominated	
Asia Artist Awards	2021	NCT Dream	U+IdolLive Popularity Award – Male Group	NCT Dream	Nominated	
Asia Artist Awards	2021	NCT Dream	AAA Japan Popularity Award – Idol Group (Male)	NCT Dream	Nominated	
Asia Artist Awards	2021	WayV	U+IdolLive Popularity Award – Male Group	WayV	Nominated	
Asia Artist Awards	2021	WayV	AAA Japan Popularity Award – Idol Group (Male)	WayV	Nominated	
Asia Artist Awards	2024	NCT 127	Stage of the Year (Daesang)	NCT 127	Won	
Asia Artist Awards	2024	NCT 127	Best Artist Award – Music	NCT 127	Won	
Asia Artist Awards	2024	WayV	Best Artist Award – Music	WayV	Won	
Asia Artist Awards	2024	NCT Wish	Best Potential Award – Music	NCT Wish	Won	
Asia Artist Awards	2026	NCT Dream	Popularity Award – Group (Male)	NCT Dream	Pending	
Asia Model Awards	2016	NCT U	New Star Award	NCT U	Won	
Asian Pop Music Awards (Note: Hosted by the Hong Kong Asia Pacific International Group and Sunway Records, the Asian Pop Music Awards bases its winners on "Asian Pop Music Chart" which opened in September 2019.)	2021	NCT 127	Best Group (Overseas)	NCT 127	Won	
Asian Pop Music Awards	2021	NCT 127	Top 20 Albums of the Year (Overseas)	Sticker	Won	
Asian Pop Music Awards	2021	WayV	Best Dance Performance (Chinese)	"Kick Back"	Won	
Asian Pop Music Awards	2021	WayV	Best Group (Chinese)	WayV	Nominated	
Asian Pop Music Awards	2021	WayV	People's Choice Award	"Kick Back"	Won	
Asian Pop Music Awards	2021	WayV	Top 20 Albums of the Year (Chinese)	Kick Back	Won	
Asian Pop Music Awards	2023	NCT 127	Top 20 Albums of the Year (Overseas)	Fact Check	Won	
Asian Pop Music Awards	2023	NCT 127	Top 20 Songs of the Year (Overseas)	"Fact Check"	Won	
Asian Pop Music Awards	2023	NCT Dream	Record of The Year (Overseas)	"Broken Melodies"	Won	
Asian Pop Music Awards	2023	NCT Dream	Top 20 Albums (Overseas)	ISTJ	Won	
Asian Pop Music Awards	2023	NCT Dream	Top 20 Songs (Overseas)	"Broken Melodies"	Won	
Asian Pop Music Awards	2023	NCT Dream	Best Group (Overseas)	NCT Dream	Nominated	
Asian Pop Music Awards	2023	WayV	Top 20 Albums of the Year	On My Youth	Won	
Asian Pop Music Awards	2023	WayV	People's Choice Award	WayV	2	
Asian Pop Music Awards	2023	WayV	Best Album of The Year	On My Youth	Nominated	
Asian Pop Music Awards	2023	WayV	Best Dance Performance	On My Youth	Nominated	
Asian Pop Music Awards	2023	WayV	Best Group	WayV	Nominated	
Asia Star Entertainer Awards	2024	NCT Wish	The Best New Artist	NCT Wish	Won	
Brand Customer Loyalty Awards	2021	NCT	Best Male Idol Group	NCT	Nominated	
Brand Customer Loyalty Awards	2023	NCT 127	Most Influential Male Idol	NCT 127	Won	
Bravo Otto	2019	NCT 127	Best K-Pop	NCT 127	Nominated	
Bravo Otto	2020	NCT 127	Best K-Pop	NCT 127	Nominated	
Circle Chart Music Awards	2017	NCT 127	New Artist of the Year	NCT 127	Won	
Circle Chart Music Awards	2018	NCT 127	Album of the Year – 2nd Quarter	Cherry Bomb	Nominated	
Circle Chart Music Awards	2019	NCT	Album of the Year – 1st Quarter	NCT 2018 Empathy	Nominated	
Circle Chart Music Awards	2019	NCT 127	Album of the Year – 4th Quarter	Regular-Irregular	Nominated	
Circle Chart Music Awards	2019	NCT Dream	Album of the Year – 3rd Quarter	We Go Up	Nominated	
Circle Chart Music Awards	2020	NCT 127	Album of the Year – 2nd Quarter	We Are Superhuman	Nominated	
Circle Chart Music Awards	2020	NCT Dream	Hot Performance of the Year	NCT Dream	Won	
Circle Chart Music Awards	2021	NCT	Album of the Year — 4th Quarter	NCT 2020 Resonance Pt. 1	Nominated	
Circle Chart Music Awards	2021	NCT	Album of the Year — 4th Quarter	NCT 2020 Resonance Pt. 2	Nominated	
Circle Chart Music Awards	2021	NCT	MuBeat Global Choice Award – Male	NCT	Nominated	
Circle Chart Music Awards	2021	NCT	Top Kit-Seller of the Year	NCT	Won	
Circle Chart Music Awards	2021	NCT	World K-Pop Star	NCT	Won	
Circle Chart Music Awards	2021	NCT 127	Album of the Year – 2nd Quarter	Neo Zone	Nominated	
Circle Chart Music Awards	2021	NCT 127	Album of the Year – 2nd Quarter	Neo Zone: The Final Round	Nominated	
Circle Chart Music Awards	2021	NCT Dream	Album of the Year – 2nd Quarter	Reload	Nominated	
Circle Chart Music Awards	2022	NCT 127	Album of the Year – 4th Quarter	Sticker	Won	
Circle Chart Music Awards	2022	NCT 127	Album of the Year – 4th Quarter	Favorite	Nominated	
Circle Chart Music Awards	2022	NCT 127	Song of the Year – September	"Sticker"	Nominated	
Circle Chart Music Awards	2022	NCT 127	Song of the Year – October	"Favorite (Vampire)"	Nominated	
Circle Chart Music Awards	2022	NCT Dream	Album of the Year – 2nd Quarter	Hot Sauce	Won	
Circle Chart Music Awards	2022	NCT Dream	Album of the Year – 3rd Quarter	Hello Future	Nominated	
Circle Chart Music Awards	2022	NCT Dream	Song of the Year – June	"Hello Future"	Nominated	
Circle Chart Music Awards	2022	NCT Dream	Top Kit-Seller of the Year	NCT Dream	Won	
Circle Chart Music Awards	2023	NCT	Album of the Year – 1st Quarter	Universe	Won	
Circle Chart Music Awards	2023	NCT	Best Kit – Album of the Year	NCT	Won	
Circle Chart Music Awards	2023	NCT 127	Album of the Year – 4th Quarter	2 Baddies	Nominated	
Circle Chart Music Awards	2023	NCT Dream	Album of the Year - 2nd Quarter	Glitch Mode	Nominated	
Circle Chart Music Awards	2023	NCT Dream	Album of the Year - 2nd Quarter	Hello Future	Nominated	
Circle Chart Music Awards	2023	NCT Dream	Song of the Year - March	Glitch Mode	Nominated	
Circle Chart Music Awards	2023	NCT Dream	Song of the Year - May	Beatbox	Nominated	
Circle Chart Music Awards	2024	NCT Dream	World K-pop Star	NCT Dream	Won	
Circle Chart Music Awards	2024	NCT Dream	Artist of the Year (Album)	ISTJ	Won	
Circle Chart Music Awards	2024	NCT Dream	Digital Album of the Year	ISTJ	Won	
Circle Chart Music Awards	2024	NCT Dream	Artist of the Year - Digital	Candy	Nominated	
Circle Chart Music Awards	2024	NCT Dream	Artist of the Year - Streaming Unique Listeners	Candy	Nominated	
D Awards	2025	NCT Wish	Rookie of the Year	NCT Wish	Won	
D Awards	2025	NCT Wish	Dreams Silver Label	NCT Wish	Won	
D Awards	2025	NCT Wish	Best Popularity Award – Boy Group	NCT Wish	Nominated	
The Fact Music Awards	2020	NCT	Fan N Star Choice Award (Artist)	NCT	Nominated	
The Fact Music Awards	2020	NCT	TMA Popularity Award	NCT	Nominated	
The Fact Music Awards	2021	NCT Dream	Fan N Star Choice Award (Artist)	NCT Dream	Nominated	
The Fact Music Awards	2021	NCT Dream	U+ Idol Live Popularity Award	NCT Dream	Nominated	
The Fact Music Awards	2022	NCT Dream	Artist of the Year (Bonsang)	NCT Dream	Won	
The Fact Music Awards	2022	NCT Dream	Best Performer Award	NCT Dream	Won	
The Fact Music Awards	2022	NCT Dream	Listener's Choice Award	NCT Dream	Won	
The Fact Music Awards	2022	NCT Dream	Worldwide Icon Award	NCT Dream	Won	
Genie Music Awards	2019	NCT 127	Performing Artist (Male)	NCT 127	Nominated	
Genie Music Awards	2020	NCT 127	Singer of the Year	NCT 127	Nominated	
Genie Music Awards	2020	NCT Dream	Singer of the Year	NCT Dream	Nominated	
Genie Music Awards	2022	NCT Dream	Album of the Year (Daesang)	Glitch Mode	Won	
Genie Music Awards	2022	NCT Dream	Singer of the Year (Daesang)	NCT Dream	Won	
Genie Music Awards	2022	NCT Dream	Best Male Group	NCT Dream	Nominated	
Genie Music Awards	2022	NCT Dream	Best Male Performance	NCT Dream	Nominated	
Genie Music Awards	2022	NCT Dream	Popularity Award	NCT Dream	Nominated	
Golden Disc Awards	2017	NCT 127	New Artist of the Year	NCT 127	Won	
Golden Disc Awards	2017	NCT 127	Disc Bonsang	NCT #127	Nominated	
Golden Disc Awards	2018	NCT 127	Disc Bonsang	Cherry Bomb	Nominated	
Golden Disc Awards	2018	NCT 127	Global Popularity Award	NCT 127	Nominated	
Golden Disc Awards	2019	NCT	Disc Bonsang	NCT 2018 Empathy	Nominated	
Golden Disc Awards	2019	NCT	Most Popular K-Pop Star	NCT	Nominated	
Golden Disc Awards	2019	NCT	Popularity Award	NCT	Nominated	
Golden Disc Awards	2019	NCT 127	Disc Bonsang	Regular-Irregular	Won	
Golden Disc Awards	2019	NCT 127	Disc Daesang	Regular-Irregular	Shortlisted	
Golden Disc Awards	2019	NCT 127	Most Popular K-Pop Star	NCT 127	Nominated	
Golden Disc Awards	2019	NCT 127	Popularity Award	NCT 127	Nominated	
Golden Disc Awards	2020	NCT Dream	Disc Bonsang	We Boom	Won	
Golden Disc Awards	2020	NCT Dream	Disc Daesang	We Boom	Shortlisted	
Golden Disc Awards	2020	NCT Dream	Popularity Award	NCT Dream	Nominated	
Golden Disc Awards	2021	NCT	Album Bonsang	NCT 2020 Resonance Pt. 1	Won	
Golden Disc Awards	2021	NCT	Album Daesang	NCT 2020 Resonance Pt. 1	Shortlisted	
Golden Disc Awards	2021	NCT	Most Popular Artist Award	NCT	Nominated	
Golden Disc Awards	2021	NCT	QQ Music Fans' Choice K-Pop Star Award	NCT	Nominated	
Golden Disc Awards	2021	NCT 127	Album Bonsang	Neo Zone	Won	
Golden Disc Awards	2021	NCT 127	Album Daesang	Neo Zone	Shortlisted	
Golden Disc Awards	2021	NCT 127	Cosmopolitan Artist Award	NCT 127	Won	
Golden Disc Awards	2022	NCT	Album Bonsang	NCT 2020 Resonance Pt. 2	Nominated	
Golden Disc Awards	2022	NCT 127	Album Bonsang	Sticker	Won	
Golden Disc Awards	2022	NCT Dream	Album Bonsang	Hot Sauce	Won	
Golden Disc Awards	2022	NCT 127	Album Daesang	Sticker	Shortlisted	
Golden Disc Awards	2022	NCT Dream	Album Daesang	Hot Sauce	Shortlisted	
Golden Disc Awards	2022	NCT	Most Popular Artist Award	NCT	Nominated	
Golden Disc Awards	2022	NCT 127	Most Popular Artist Award	NCT 127	Nominated	
Golden Disc Awards	2022	NCT Dream	Most Popular Artist Award	NCT Dream	Nominated	
Golden Disc Awards	2023	NCT	Album Bonsang	Universe	Won	
Golden Disc Awards	2023	NCT 127	Album Bonsang	2 Baddies	Won	
Golden Disc Awards	2023	NCT Dream	Album Bonsang	Glitch Mode	Won	
Golden Disc Awards	2024	NCT	Album Bonsang	Golden Age	Nominated	
Golden Disc Awards	2024	NCT 127	Album Bonsang	Fact Check	Nominated	
Golden Disc Awards	2024	NCT Dream	Album Bonsang	ISTJ	Won	
Golden Disc Awards	2024	NCT Dream	Album Daesang	ISTJ	Nominated	
Golden Disc Awards	2024	NCT Dream	Digital Bonsang	Candy	Nominated	
Golden Disc Awards	2025	NCT Wish	Rookie Artist of the year	NCT Wish	Won	
Golden Disc Awards	2025	NCT Wish	Most Popular Artist – Male	NCT Wish	Nominated	
Golden Disc Awards	2025	NCT Wish	Album Bonsang	Steady	Nominated	
Golden Disc Awards	2025	NCT Dream	Album Bonsang	Dream()scape	Won	
Golden Disc Awards	2025	NCT Dream	Disc Daesang	Dream()scape	Nominated	
Golden Disc Awards	2025	NCT Dream	Most Popular Artist – Male	NCT Dream	Nominated	
Golden Disc Awards	2025	NCT 127	Album Bonsang	Walk	Nominated	
Golden Disc Awards	2025	NCT 127	Most Popular Artist – Male	NCT 127	Nominated	
Golden Disc Awards	2026	NCT Wish	Album Bonsang	Color	Won	
Golden Disc Awards	2026	NCT Wish	Album Daesang (Album of the Year)	Color	Nominated	
Golden Disc Awards	2026	NCT Wish	Most Popular Artist – Male	NCT Wish	Nominated	
Golden Disc Awards	2026	NCT Dream	Album Bonsang	Dreamscape	Nominated	
Golden Disc Awards	2026	NCT Dream	Most Popular Artist – Male	NCT Dream	Nominated	
Hanteo Music Awards	2021	NCT Dream	Artist Award — Male Group	NCT Dream	Won	
Hanteo Music Awards	2021	NCT 127	Initial Chodong Record Award	Sticker	Won	
Hanteo Music Awards	2021	NCT Dream	Initial Chodong Record Award	Hot Sauce	Won	
Hanteo Music Awards	2022	NCT Dream	Best Album (Daesang)	NCT Dream	Won	
Hanteo Music Awards	2022	NCT Dream	Artist of the Year (Bonsang)	NCT Dream	Won	
Hanteo Music Awards	2022	NCT 127	Artist of the Year (Bonsang)	NCT 127	Won	
Hanteo Music Awards	2023	NCT 127	Artist of the Year (Bonsang)	NCT 127	Won	
Hanteo Music Awards	2023	NCT Dream	Artist of the Year (Bonsang)	NCT Dream	Won	
Hanteo Music Awards	2023	NCT Dream	Best Artist (Daesang)	NCT Dream	Won	
iHeartRadio Music Awards	2021	NCT 127	Best Fan Army	NCT 127	Nominated	
iHeartRadio Music Awards	2024	NCT Dream	K-Pop Artist of the Year	NCT Dream	Nominated	
iHeartRadio Music Awards	2025	NCT Wish	Best New Artist (K-pop)	NCT Wish	Nominated	
Indonesian Television Awards	2019	NCT 127	Special Award – Person of the Year	NCT 127	Won	
K-Global Heart Dream Awards	2022	NCT Dream	Main Award	NCT Dream	Won	
K-Global Heart Dream Awards	2022	NCT Dream	K-Global Best Artist Award	NCT Dream	Won	
Korea-China Management Awards	2018	NCT 127	Asia Rising Star Award	NCT 127	Won	
Korea First Brand Awards	2017	NCT Dream	Chinese Special Prize	NCT Dream	Won	
Korea First Brand Awards	2026	NCT Wish	Male Idol – Hot Trend	NCT Wish	Won	
Korea Grand Music Awards	2024	NCT	Best Artist 10	NCT	Nominated	
Korea Grand Music Awards	2024	NCT 127	Best Artist 10	NCT 127	Nominated	
Korea Grand Music Awards	2024	NCT 127	Best Song 10	"Walk"	Nominated	
Korea Grand Music Awards	2024	NCT 127	Trend of the Year – K-pop Group	NCT 127	Nominated	
Korea Grand Music Awards	2024	NCT Dream	Best Song 10	"Smoothie"	Won	
Korea Grand Music Awards	2024	NCT Dream	Best Artist 10	NCT Dream	Nominated	
Korea Grand Music Awards	2024	NCT Dream	Trend of the Year – K-pop Group	NCT Dream	Nominated	
Korea Grand Music Awards	2024	NCT Wish	IS Rising Star	NCT Wish	Won	
Korea Grand Music Awards	2024	NCT Wish	Best Artist 10	NCT Wish	Nominated	
Korea Grand Music Awards	2024	NCT Wish	Best Song 10	"Songbird"	Nominated	
Korea Grand Music Awards	2024	NCT Wish	Fan Vote Rookie – Male	NCT Wish	Nominated	
Korea Grand Music Awards	2025	NCT Dream	Best Artist 10	NCT Dream	Nominated	
Korea Grand Music Awards	2025	NCT Dream	Trend of the Year – K-pop Group	NCT Dream	Nominated	
Korea Grand Music Awards	2025	NCT Dream	Best Music 10	"Go Back to the Future"	Nominated	
Korea Grand Music Awards	2025	NCT Dream	Best Dance Performance	"Chiller"	Nominated	
Korea Grand Music Awards	2025	NCT Wish	Best Artist 10	NCT Wish	Nominated	
Korea Grand Music Awards	2025	NCT Wish	Best Music 10	"Color"	Nominated	
Korea Grand Music Awards	2025	NCT Wish	Best Dance Performance	"Color"	Nominated	
Korea Popular Music Awards (Note: The Korea Popular Music Awards were jointly established in 2018 by the Korea Singers Association, the Korea Entertainment Producer's Association, the Recording Industry Association of Korea, the Federation of Korean Music Performers, and the Korea Music Copyright Association.)	2018	NCT 127	Bonsang Award	NCT 127	Won	
Korean Culture Entertainment Awards	2017	NCT 127	K-Pop Artist Award	NCT 127	Won	
Korean Entertainment Arts Awards (Note: The Korean Entertainment Arts Awards are an annual awards show held in South Korea established in 1995.)	2017	NCT 127	Newcomer Award	NCT 127	Won	
Korean Entertainment Arts Awards	2018	NCT 127	Group Singer Award (Male) (Note: Renamed Group Daesang - Boy Group.)	NCT 127	Won	
Korean Entertainment Arts Awards	2019	NCT Dream	Best Boy Group (Note: The award was named "Boy Group Grand Award" in the 2019 ceremony, even though it wasn't a grand award, but just a regular award category, and this award ceremony isn't a major award ceremony as well, hence not recognised as an actual grand award won.)	NCT Dream	Won	
Korean Entertainment Arts Awards	2020	NCT Dream	Best Singer — Idol Group	NCT Dream	Won	
Korean Music Awards	2018	NCT 127	Best Pop Song	"Cherry Bomb"	Nominated	
MAMA Awards	2016	NCT 127	Best New Male Artist	NCT 127	Won	
MAMA Awards	2017	NCT 127	Best Dance Performance – Male Group	"Cherry Bomb"	Nominated	
MAMA Awards	2017	NCT 127	New Asian Artist	NCT 127	Won	
MAMA Awards	2018	NCT 127	Artist of the Year	NCT 127	Nominated	
MAMA Awards	2018	NCT 127	Best Male Group	NCT 127	Nominated	
MAMA Awards	2018	NCT 127	Worldwide Fans' Choice Top 10	NCT 127	Won	
MAMA Awards	2018	NCT 127	Worldwide Icon of the Year	NCT 127	Shortlisted	
MAMA Awards	2019	NCT 127	Artist of the Year	NCT 127	Nominated	
MAMA Awards	2019	NCT 127	Best Male Group	NCT 127	Nominated	
MAMA Awards	2019	WayV	Best New Asian Artist	WayV	Won	
MAMA Awards	2019	NCT 127	Worldwide Fans' Choice Top 10	NCT 127	Nominated	
MAMA Awards	2020	NCT	Artist of the Year	NCT	Nominated	
MAMA Awards	2020	NCT 127	Best Dance Performance – Male Group	"Kick It"	Nominated	
MAMA Awards	2020	NCT	Best Male Group	NCT	Nominated	
MAMA Awards	2020	WayV	Favorite Asian Artist	WayV	Won	
MAMA Awards	2020	NCT	Favorite Male Group	NCT	Won	
MAMA Awards	2020	NCT 127	Song of the Year	"Kick It"	Nominated	
MAMA Awards	2020	NCT	Worldwide Fans' Choice Top 10	NCT	Won	
MAMA Awards	2020	NCT	Worldwide Icon of the Year	NCT	Shortlisted	
MAMA Awards	2021	NCT 127	Album of the Year	Sticker	Nominated	
MAMA Awards	2021	NCT Dream	Album of the Year	Hot Sauce	Nominated	
MAMA Awards	2021	NCT 127	Artist of the Year	NCT 127	Nominated	
MAMA Awards	2021	NCT Dream	Artist of the Year	NCT Dream	Longlisted	
MAMA Awards	2021	NCT 127	Best Male Group	NCT 127	Nominated	
MAMA Awards	2021	NCT Dream	Best Male Group	NCT Dream	Nominated	
MAMA Awards	2021	NCT 127	Best Dance Performance – Male Group	"Sticker"	Nominated	
MAMA Awards	2021	NCT Dream	Best Dance Performance – Male Group	"Hot Sauce"	Nominated	
MAMA Awards	2021	NCT 127	Song of the Year	"Sticker"	Nominated	
MAMA Awards	2021	NCT Dream	Song of the Year	"Hot Sauce"	Nominated	
MAMA Awards	2021	NCT 127	Worldwide Fans' Choice Top 10	NCT 127	Won	
MAMA Awards	2021	NCT Dream	Worldwide Fans' Choice Top 10	NCT Dream	Won	
MAMA Awards	2021	NCT 127	Worldwide Icon of the Year	NCT 127	Shortlisted	
MAMA Awards	2021	NCT Dream	Worldwide Icon of the Year	NCT Dream	Shortlisted	
MAMA Awards	2022	NCT 127	Best Dance Performance – Male Group	"2 Baddies"	Nominated	
MAMA Awards	2022	NCT 127	Song of the Year	"2 Baddies"	Nominated	
MAMA Awards	2022	NCT 127	Worldwide Fans' Choice Top 10	NCT 127	Nominated	
MAMA Awards	2022	NCT Dream	Artist of the Year	NCT Dream	Nominated	
MAMA Awards	2022	NCT Dream	Best Dance Performance – Male Group	"Glitch Mode"	Nominated	
MAMA Awards	2022	NCT Dream	Best Male Group	NCT Dream	Nominated	
MAMA Awards	2022	NCT Dream	Song of the Year	"Glitch Mode"	Nominated	
MAMA Awards	2022	NCT Dream	Worldwide Fans' Choice Top 10	NCT Dream	Won	
MAMA Awards	2023	NCT 127	Best Dance Performance – Male Group	"Ay-Yo"	Nominated	
MAMA Awards	2023	NCT 127	Worldwide Fans' Choice Top 10	NCT 127	Nominated	
MAMA Awards	2023	NCT Dream	Worldwide Fans' Choice Top 10	NCT Dream	Won	
MAMA Awards	2023	NCT Dream	Album of the Year	ISTJ	Nominated	
MAMA Awards	2023	NCT Dream	Artist of the Year	NCT Dream	Nominated	
MAMA Awards	2023	NCT Dream	Best Dance Performance – Male Group	"Candy"	Nominated	
MAMA Awards	2023	NCT Dream	Best Male Group	NCT Dream	Nominated	
MAMA Awards	2024	NCT Wish	Artist of the Year	NCT Wish	Nominated	
MAMA Awards	2024	NCT Wish	Best New Male Artist	NCT Wish	Nominated	
Melon Music Awards	2016	NCT 127	Best New Artist	NCT 127	Nominated	
Melon Music Awards	2020	NCT 127	Album of the Year	Neo Zone	Nominated	
Melon Music Awards	2020	NCT 127	Top 10 Artists	NCT 127	Nominated	
Melon Music Awards	2020	NCT Dream	Best Dance – Male	"Ridin'"	Nominated	
Melon Music Awards	2021	NCT Dream	Album of the Year	Hot Sauce	Nominated	
Melon Music Awards	2021	NCT Dream	Artist of the Year	NCT Dream	Nominated	
Melon Music Awards	2021	NCT Dream	Best Male Group	NCT Dream	Nominated	
Melon Music Awards	2021	NCT Dream	Top 10 Artists	NCT Dream	Won	
Melon Music Awards	2022	NCT 127	Netizen Popularity Award	NCT 127	Nominated	
Melon Music Awards	2022	NCT Dream	Album of the Year	Glitch Mode	Nominated	
Melon Music Awards	2022	NCT Dream	Artist of the Year	NCT Dream	Nominated	
Melon Music Awards	2022	NCT Dream	Best Male Group	NCT Dream	Nominated	
Melon Music Awards	2022	NCT Dream	Netizen Popularity Award	NCT Dream	Nominated	
Melon Music Awards	2022	NCT Dream	Top 10 Artists	NCT Dream	Won	
Melon Music Awards	2023	NCT 127	Top 10 Artists	NCT 127	Nominated	
Melon Music Awards	2023	NCT 127	Millions Top 10 Artists	Ay-Yo	Nominated	
Melon Music Awards	2023	NCT Dream	Record of the Year	NCT Dream	Won	
Melon Music Awards	2023	NCT Dream	Album of the Year	ISTJ	Nominated	
Melon Music Awards	2023	NCT Dream	Artist of the Year	NCT Dream	Nominated	
Melon Music Awards	2023	NCT Dream	Song of the Year	Candy	Nominated	
Melon Music Awards	2023	NCT Dream	Best Male Group	NCT Dream	Won	
Melon Music Awards	2023	NCT Dream	Top 10 Artists	NCT Dream	Won	
Melon Music Awards	2023	NCT Dream	Millions Top 10 Artists	ISTJ	Won	
Melon Music Awards	2023	NCT Dream	KakaoBank Favorite Star	NCT Dream	Nominated	
Melon Music Awards	2024	NCT 127	Millions Top 10 Artists	Walk	Nominated	
Melon Music Awards	2024	NCT Dream	Millions Top 10 Artists	Dream()scape	Nominated	
Melon Music Awards	2025	NCT Dream	Top 10 Artists	NCT Dream	Nominated	
Melon Music Awards	2025	NCT Dream	Millions Top 10 Artists	"Go Back To The Future"	Nominated	
Melon Music Awards	2025	NCT Dream	Berriz Global Fan's Choice	NCT Dream	Nominated	
Melon Music Awards	2025	NCT Wish	Top 10 Artist	NCT Wish	Won	
Melon Music Awards	2025	NCT Wish	Kakao Bank Everyone's Star	NCT Wish	Won	
Melon Music Awards	2025	NCT Wish	Artist of the Year	NCT Wish	Nominated	
Melon Music Awards	2025	NCT Wish	Millions Top 10	Color	Nominated	
Melon Music Awards	2025	NCT Wish	Berriz Global Fan's Choice	NCT Wish	Nominated	
MTV Europe Music Award	2021	NCT 127	Best K-Pop	NCT 127	Nominated	
MTV MIAW Awards	2022	NCT 2021	K-Pop Domination	NCT 2021	Nominated	
MTV MIAW Awards	2023	NCT Dream	K-Pop Domination	NCT Dream	Nominated	
MTV Video Music Awards	2019	NCT 127	Best K-Pop	"Regular"	Nominated	
MTV Video Music Awards	2024	NCT Dream	Best K-Pop	"Smoothie"	Nominated	
MTV Video Music Awards	2024	NCT Dream	Best Group	NCT Dream	Nominated	
Nickelodeon Mexico Kids' Choice Awards	2023	NCT Dream	Favorite K-Pop Group	NCT Dream	Nominated	
Seoul Music Awards	2017	NCT 127	New Artist of the Year	NCT 127	Won	
Seoul Music Awards	2018	NCT 127	Bonsang Award	NCT 127	Nominated	
Seoul Music Awards	2018	NCT 127	Hallyu Special Award	NCT 127	Nominated	
Seoul Music Awards	2018	NCT 127	Popularity Award	NCT 127	Nominated	
Seoul Music Awards	2018	NCT 127	Dance Performance Award	NCT 127	Won	
Seoul Music Awards	2019	NCT 127	Bonsang Award	NCT 127	Won	
Seoul Music Awards	2019	NCT 127	Hallyu Special Award	NCT 127	Nominated	
Seoul Music Awards	2019	NCT 127	Popularity Award	NCT 127	Nominated	
Seoul Music Awards	2020	NCT 127	Bonsang Award	NCT 127	Nominated	
Seoul Music Awards	2020	NCT Dream	Bonsang Award	NCT Dream	Won	
Seoul Music Awards	2020	NCT 127	K-Wave Award	NCT 127	Nominated	
Seoul Music Awards	2020	NCT Dream	K-Wave Award	NCT Dream	Nominated	
Seoul Music Awards	2020	NCT 127	Popularity Award	NCT 127	Nominated	
Seoul Music Awards	2020	NCT Dream	Popularity Award	NCT Dream	Nominated	
Seoul Music Awards	2020	NCT 127	QQ Music Most Popular K-Pop Artist Award	NCT 127	Nominated	
Seoul Music Awards	2020	NCT Dream	QQ Music Most Popular K-Pop Artist Award	NCT Dream	Nominated	
Seoul Music Awards	2021	NCT	Bonsang Award	NCT	Nominated	
Seoul Music Awards	2021	NCT 127	Bonsang Award	NCT 127	Won	
Seoul Music Awards	2021	NCT 127	Fan PD Artist Award	NCT 127	Nominated	
Seoul Music Awards	2021	NCT Dream	Fan PD Artist Award	NCT Dream	Nominated	
Seoul Music Awards	2021	WayV	Fan PD Artist Award	WayV	Nominated	
Seoul Music Awards	2021	NCT	K-Wave Popularity Award	NCT	Nominated	
Seoul Music Awards	2021	NCT 127	Legend Rookie Prize	NCT 127	Nominated	
Seoul Music Awards	2021	NCT	Popularity Award	NCT	Nominated	
Seoul Music Awards	2021	NCT	WhosFandom Award	NCT	Nominated	
Seoul Music Awards	2022	NCT Dream	Best Album Award	Hot Sauce	Won	
Seoul Music Awards	2022	NCT 127	Bonsang Award	Sticker	Won	
Seoul Music Awards	2022	NCT Dream	Bonsang Award	Hot Sauce	Nominated	
Seoul Music Awards	2022	NCT 127	Grand Prize (Daesang)	NCT 127	Won	
Seoul Music Awards	2022	NCT 127	Popularity Award	NCT 127	Nominated	
Seoul Music Awards	2022	NCT Dream	Popularity Award	NCT Dream	Nominated	
Seoul Music Awards	2022	NCT 127	K-wave Popularity Award	NCT 127	Nominated	
Seoul Music Awards	2022	NCT Dream	K-wave Popularity Award	NCT Dream	Nominated	
Seoul Music Awards	2022	NCT 127	U+Idol Live Best Artist Award	NCT 127	Nominated	
Seoul Music Awards	2022	NCT Dream	U+Idol Live Best Artist Award	NCT Dream	Nominated	
Seoul Music Awards	2023	NCT 127	Bonsang Award	NCT 127	Nominated	
Seoul Music Awards	2023	NCT 127	Popularity Award	NCT 127	Nominated	
Seoul Music Awards	2023	NCT Dream	Grand Prize (Daesang)	NCT Dream	Won	
Seoul Music Awards	2023	NCT Dream	Bonsang Award	NCT Dream	Won	
Seoul Music Awards	2023	NCT Dream	Popularity Award	NCT Dream	Nominated	
Seoul Music Awards	2024	NCT Dream	Grand Prize (Daesang)	NCT Dream	Won	
Seoul Music Awards	2024	NCT Dream	Bonsang Award	NCT Dream	Won	
Seoul Music Awards	2025	NCT Dream	Bonsang Award	NCT Dream	Won	
Seoul Music Awards	2025	NCT Dream	Popularity Award	NCT Dream	Nominated	
Seoul Music Awards	2025	NCT Dream	K-Wave Special Award	NCT Dream	Nominated	
Seoul Music Awards	2025	NCT Dream	K-pop World Choice – Group	NCT Dream	Nominated	
Seoul Music Awards	2025	NCT Wish	Bonsang Award	NCT Wish	Won	
Seoul Music Awards	2025	NCT Wish	Best Group Award	NCT Wish	Won	
Seoul Music Awards	2025	NCT Wish	Popularity Award	NCT Wish	Nominated	
Seoul Music Awards	2025	NCT Wish	K-Wave Special Award	NCT Wish	Nominated	
Seoul Music Awards	2025	NCT Wish	K-pop World Choice – Group	NCT Wish	Nominated	
Sohu Fashion Festival	2021	WayV	Most Popular Group of the Year	WayV	Nominated	
Soompi Awards	2019	NCT	Breakout Artist	NCT	Won	
Soompi Awards	2019	NCT	Twitter Rising Fandom	NCT	Won	
Soribada Best K-Music Awards	2017	NCT 127	New Hallyu Best Performance (Boy Group)	NCT 127	Won	
Soribada Best K-Music Awards	2018	NCT 127	Bonsang Award	NCT 127	Won	
Soribada Best K-Music Awards	2018	NCT 127	Global Fandom Award	NCT 127	Nominated	
Soribada Best K-Music Awards	2018	NCT 127	Popularity Award (Male)	NCT 127	Nominated	
Soribada Best K-Music Awards	2019	NCT 127	Bonsang Award	NCT 127	Won	
Soribada Best K-Music Awards	2019	NCT 127	Social Artist Award	NCT 127	Won	
Soribada Best K-Music Awards	2020	NCT 127	Bonsang Award	NCT 127	Nominated	
Soribada Best K-Music Awards	2020	NCT Dream	Bonsang Award	NCT Dream	Won	
Teen Choice Awards	2018	NCT	Choice Next Big Thing	NCT	Nominated	
Teen Choice Awards	2019	NCT 127	Choice International Artist	NCT 127	Nominated	
V Chart Awards	2017	NCT 127	Best Rookie Of The Year	NCT 127	Won	
V Chart Awards	2017	NCT 127	Hallyu Rookie Award	NCT 127	Won	
V Chart Awards	2017	NCT Dream	Top Promising Group	NCT Dream	Won	
TMElive International Music Awards	2025	NCT Wish	Rising International Group of the Year	NCT Wish	Won	
V Live Awards	2017	NCT 127	Global Rookie Top 5	NCT 127	Won	
V Live Awards	2019	NCT	Best Channel – 1 million followers	NCT	Nominated	
V Live Awards	2019	NCT	Global Artist Top 12	NCT	Won	
V Live Awards	2019	NCT	Top 10 Artist	NCT	Nominated	

== Other accolades ==
=== State honors ===
Country	Year	Honor	Recipient	Ref.
South Korea (Note: Honors are given at the Korean Popular Culture and Arts Awards, organized by the Korea Creative Content Agency and hosted by the South Korean Ministry of Culture, Sports and Tourism. They are awarded to individuals or groups for their contribution to popular culture in South Korea and abroad.)	2019	Minister of Culture, Sports and Tourism Commendation	NCT 127	
South Korea	2021	Minister of Culture, Sports and Tourism Commendation	NCT Dream	

=== Listicles ===
Name of publisher, year listed, name of listicle, and placement
Publisher	Year	Recipient	Listicle	Rank	Ref(s)
Billboard	2018	NCT Dream	21 Under 21	20th	
Billboard	2019	NCT Dream	21 Under 21	13th	
Billboard	2020	NCT Dream	21 Under 21	Placed	
Forbes Korea	2025	NCT Dream	K-Idol of the Year 30	29th	
Sisa Journal (Note: The Sisa Journal is one of the major weekly news magazines in Korea. Established in 1989, its annually conducted 'Who Moves Korea' survey determines the most influential figures in the country and highlights next-generation leaders of Korea. The survey is conducted on a total of 1000 experts across 10 fields, including professors, journalists, politicians, businessmen, and cultural artists.)	2021	NCT 127	100 Next Generation Leaders – Culture and Arts	Placed	
Time	2018	NCT Dream	25 Most Influential Teens	Placed	

== See also ==
- List of awards and nominations received by Doyoung
- List of awards and nominations received by Ten
- List of awards and nominations received by Mark
- List of awards and nominationa received by Haechan
- List of awards and nominations received by Jaemin
- List of awards and nominations received by Chenle
