= List of M Countdown Chart winners (2021) =

Winners of South Korean music program M Countdown

M Countdown Chart winners (2021)

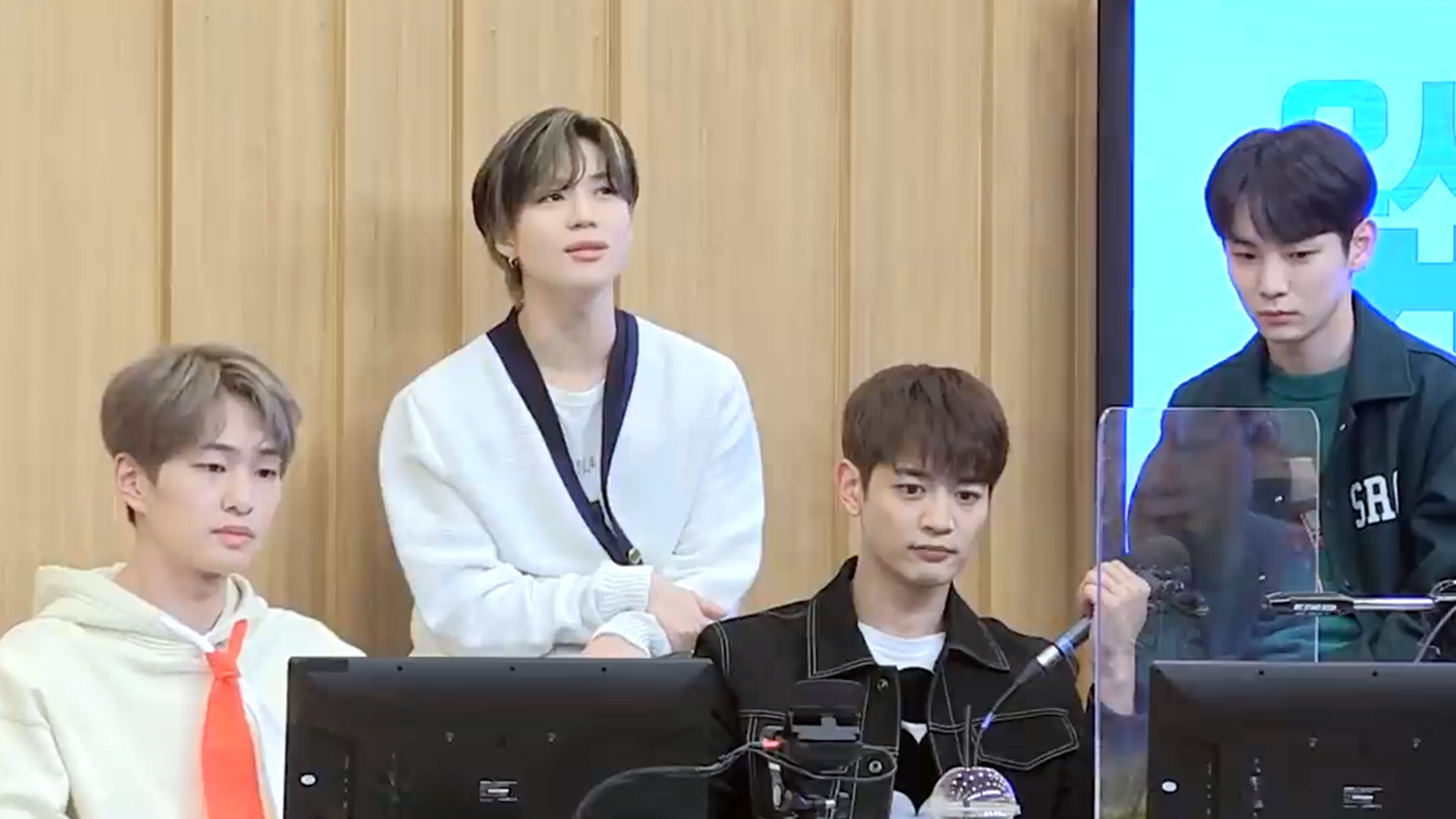
Shinee (pictured) earned the highest score of 2021, with 10,990 points for "Don't Call Me" on the March 4 broadcast.

The M Countdown Chart is a record chart on the South Korean Mnet television music program M Countdown. Every week, the show awards the best-performing single on the chart in the country during its live broadcast.

In 2021, 26 singles ranked number one on the chart and 23 music acts received first-place trophies. "Hwaa" by (G)I-dle, "Hot Sauce" by NCT Dream and "Sticker" by NCT 127 are the only songs to achieve a triple crown. No release earned a perfect score, but "Don't Call Me" by Shinee acquired the highest point total of the year on the March 4 broadcast with a score of 10,990.

== Scoring system ==
Songs are judged based on a combination of Digital Sales (45%; Melon, Genie, FLO), Album Sales (15%), Social Media (15%; YouTube MV views), Global Fan Vote (15%), Mnet Broadcast (10%; Mnet TV, MCD Stage, M2 Contents), Live Vote (10%; for first place nominees only).

== Chart history ==
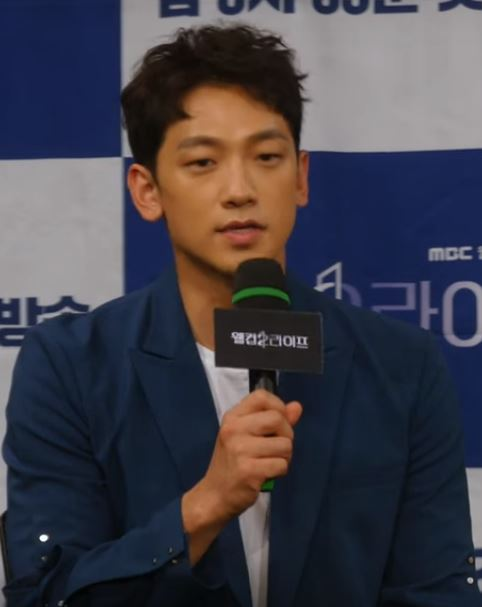
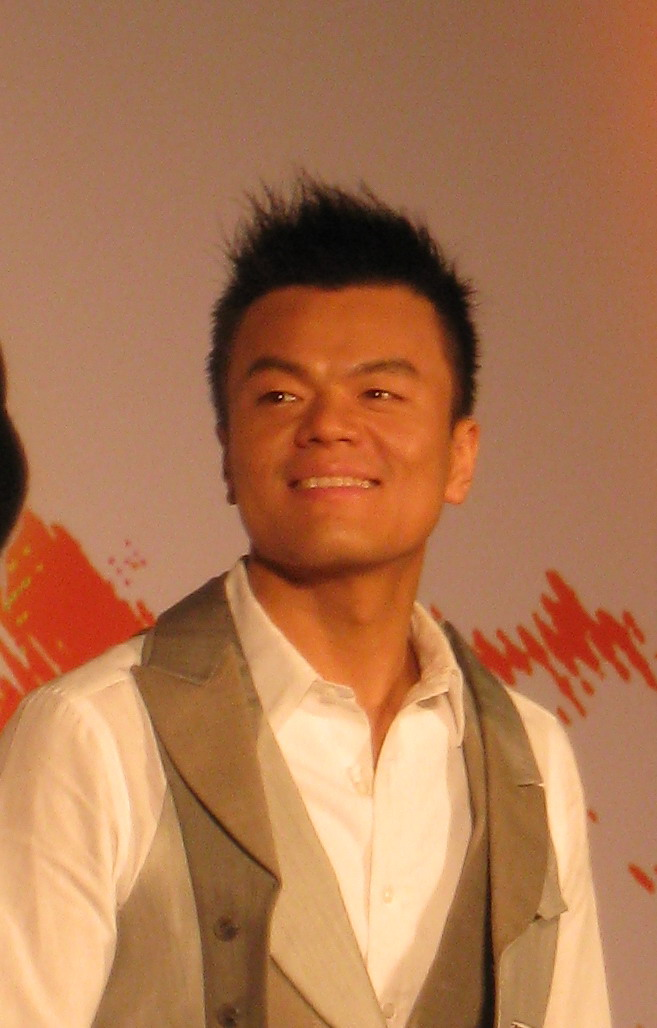
Rain (left) and J.Y. Park (right) won M Countdown for "Switch to Me," marking Rain's first win on the program since 2014, and Park's first M Countdown trophy and first music show award since 2007.

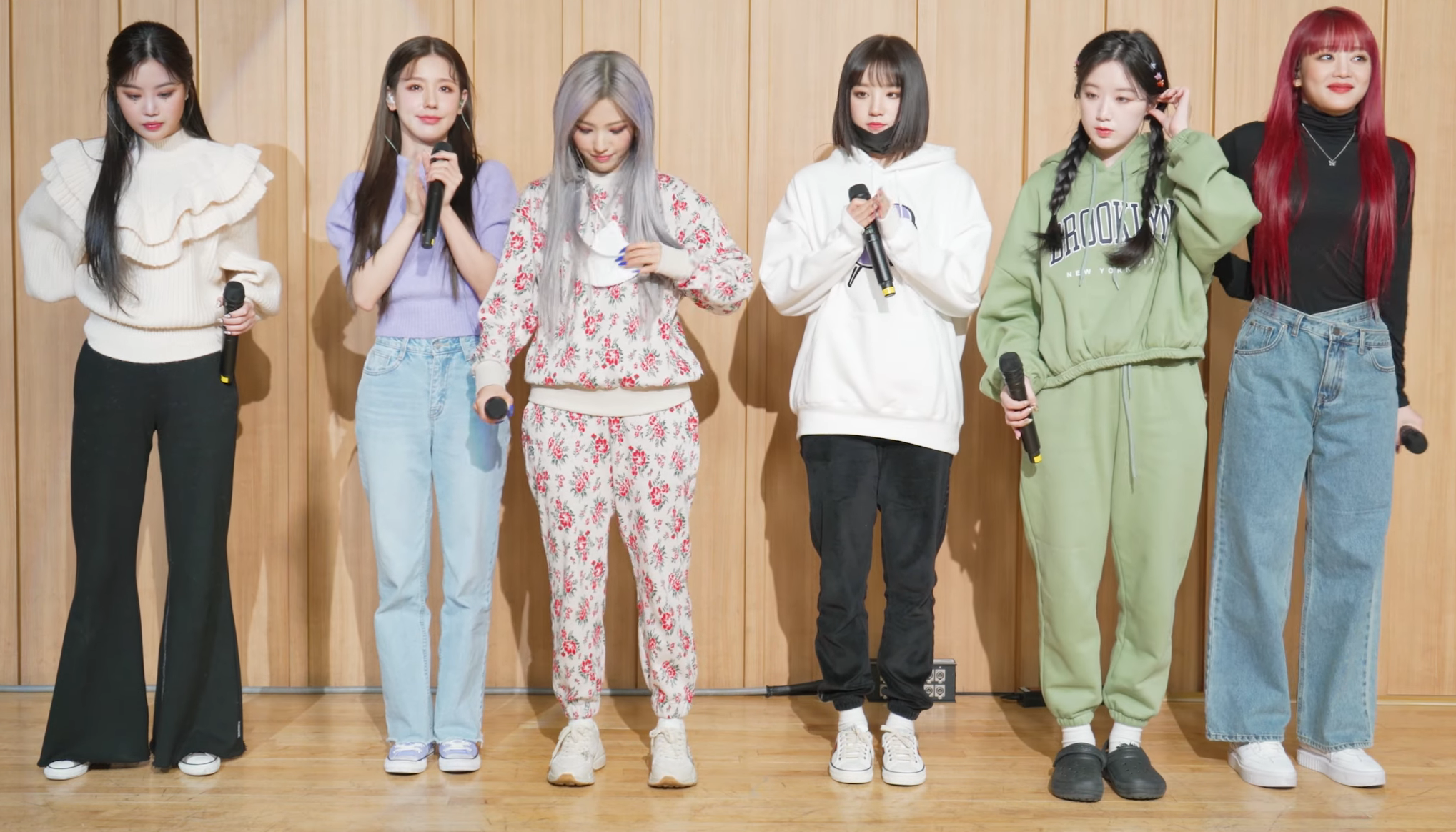
(G)I-dle's (pictured) M Countdown wins for "Hwaa" marked the group's first ever triple crown. Member Jeon So-yeon (third from left) also won her first solo trophy on the program for "Beam Beam". Member Miyeon (second from left) currently co-hosts M Countdown.

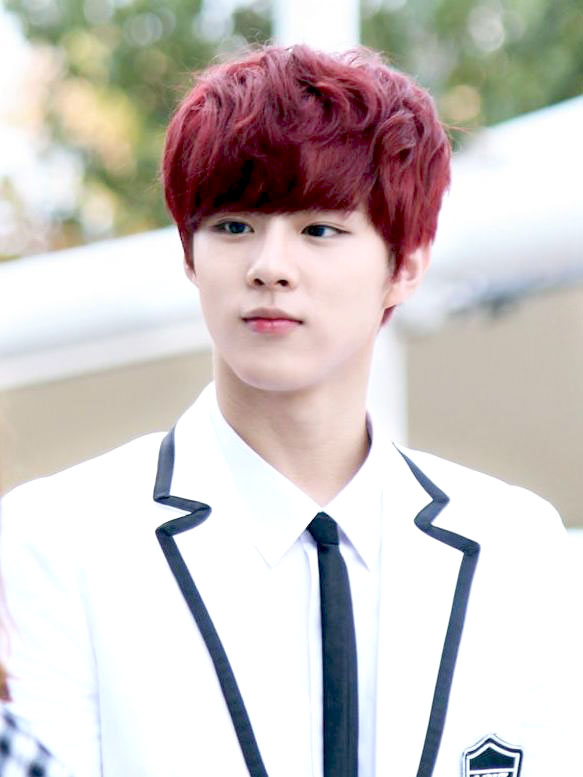
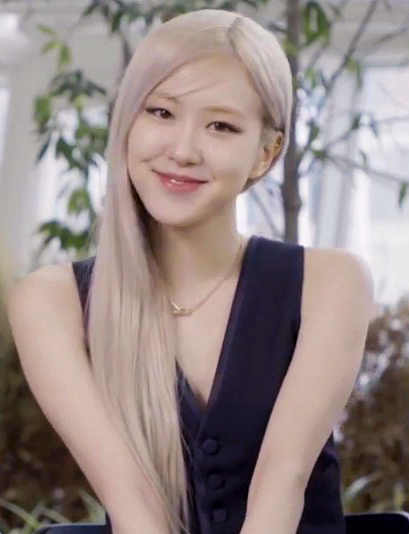
Kim Wooseok of Up10tion (left) won his first ever music show trophy as a soloist for "Sugar", while Rosé of Blackpink (right) won her first M Countdown trophy as a soloist for "On the Ground".
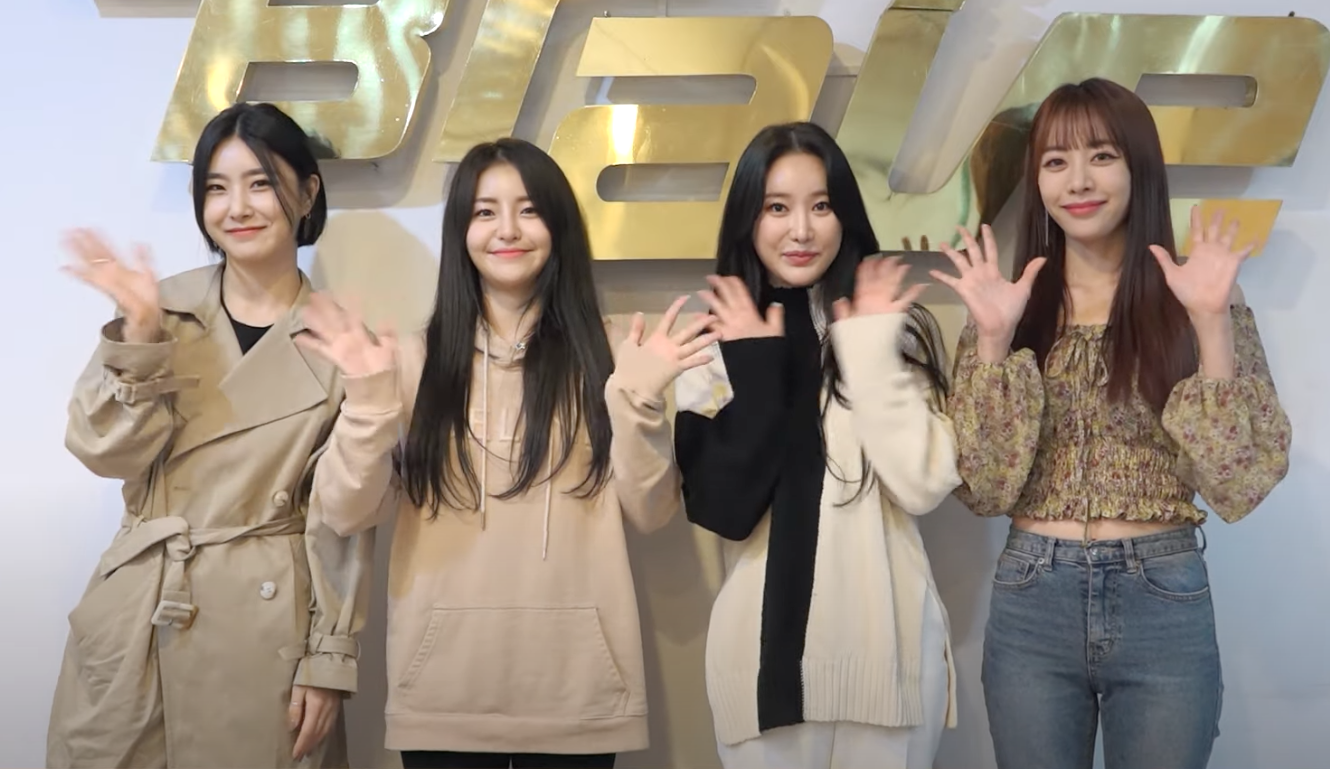
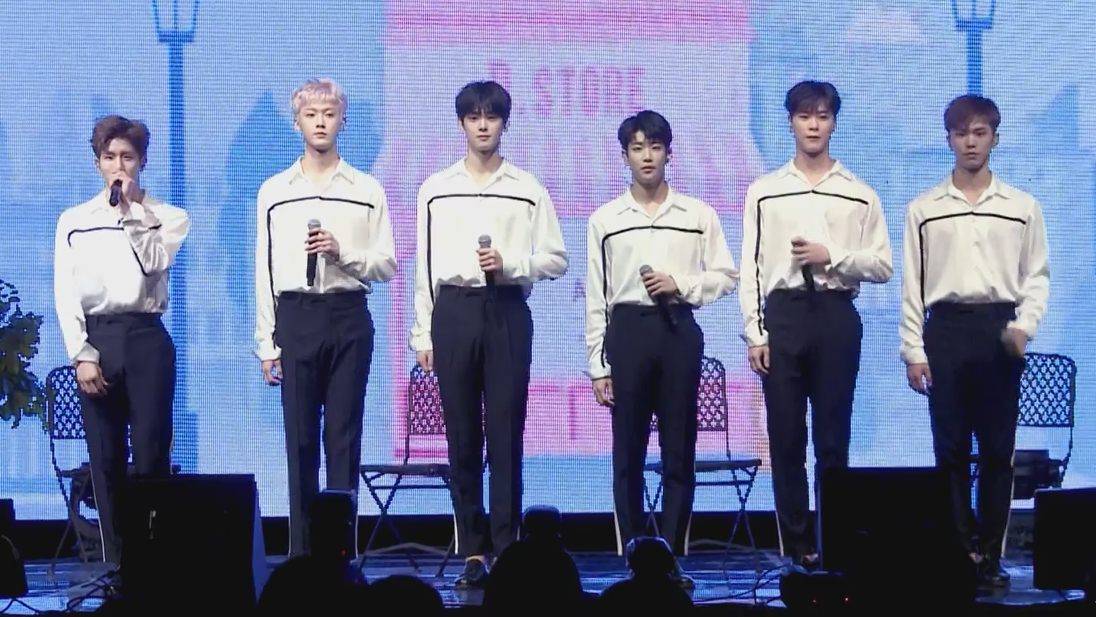
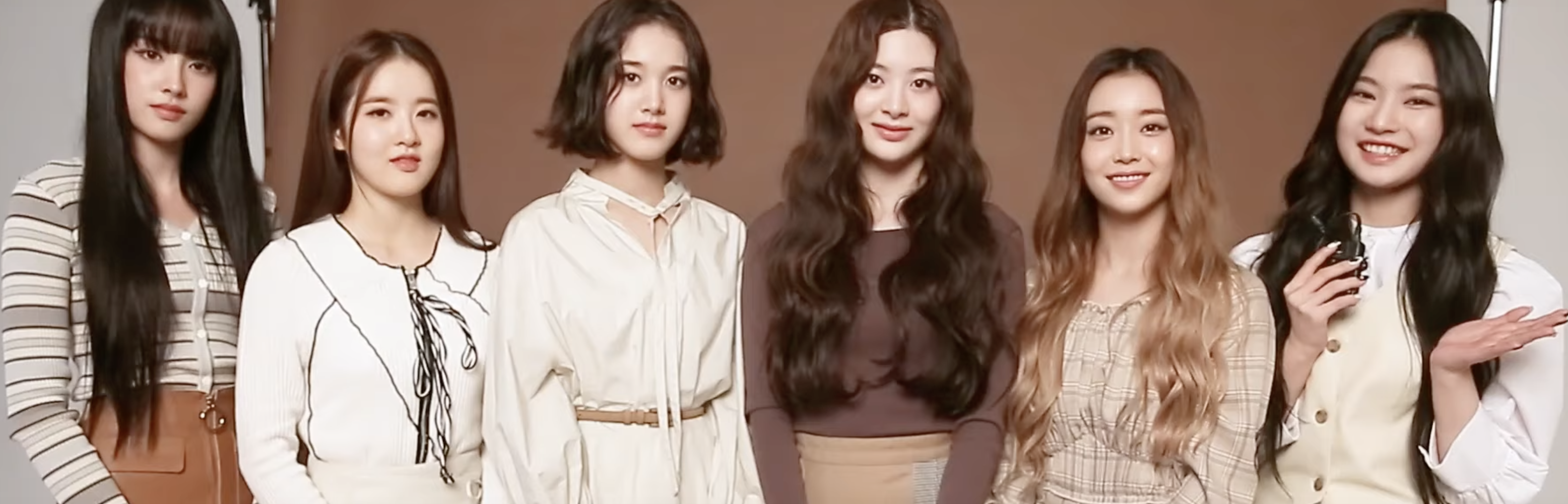
Brave Girls (top), Astro (middle), and STAYC (bottom) won their first ever M Countdown trophies with "Rollin'," "One," and "Stereotype" respectively.

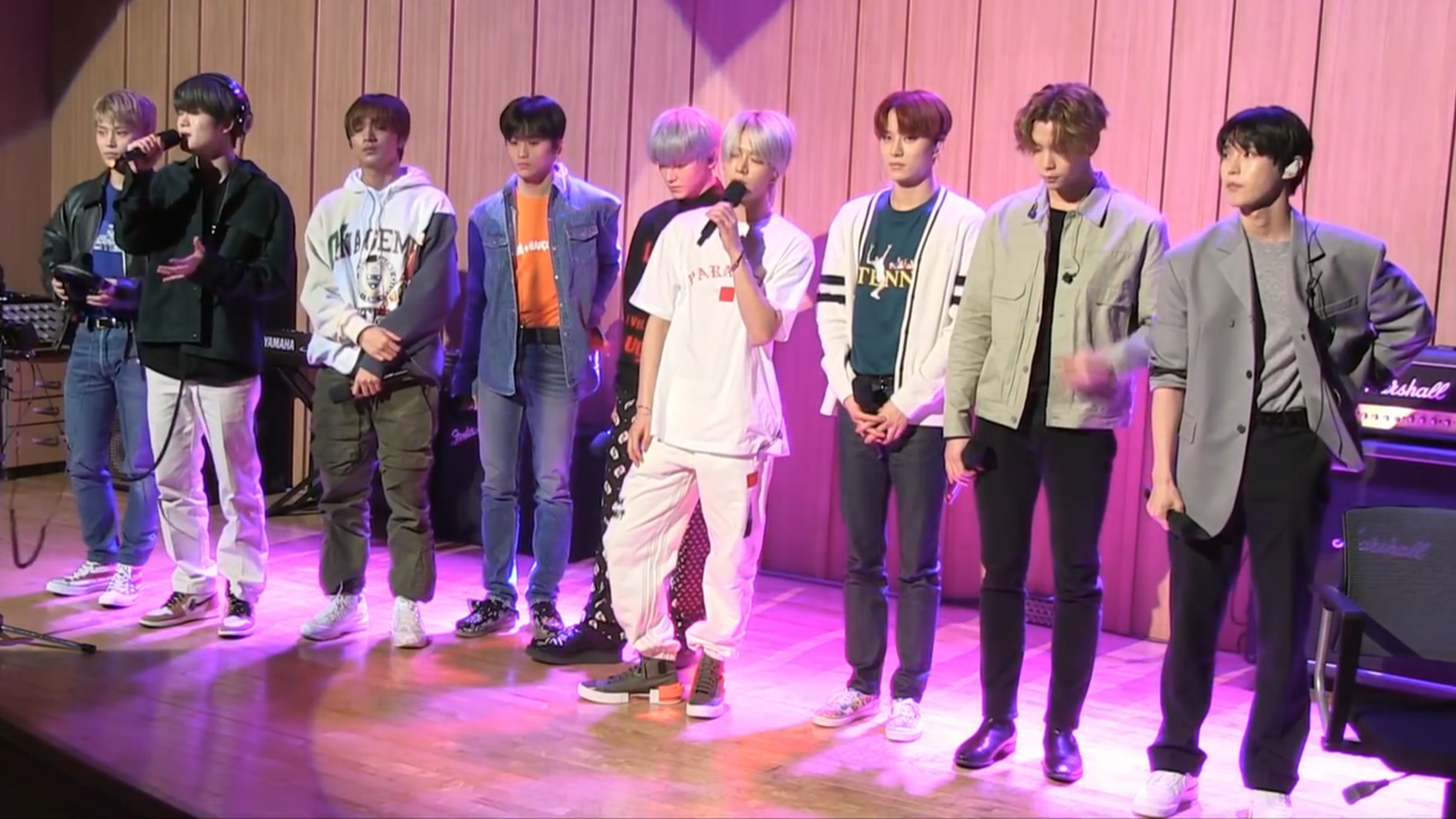
NCT 127's (pictured) M Countdown wins for "Sticker" served as the group's first ever Triple Crown.

Key
	Triple Crown
	Highest score of the year
—	No show was held

Episode	Date	Artist	Song	Points	Ref.
—N/a	January 7	No Broadcast or Winner			
694	January 14	Rain & J. Y. Park	"Switch to Me"	5,886	
695	January 21	(G)I-dle	"Hwaa"	9,594	
696	January 28	(G)I-dle	"Hwaa"	7,725	
697	February 4	(G)I-dle	"Hwaa"	7,173	
—	February 11	No Broadcast or Winner			
698	February 18	Kim Woo Seok	"Sugar"	6,747	
699	February 25	Kang Daniel	"Paranoia"	8,599	
700	March 4	Shinee	"Don't Call Me"	10,990	
701	March 11	Shinee	"Don't Call Me"	7,505	
702	March 18	Brave Girls	"Rollin'"	6,347	
703	March 25	Rosé	"On the Ground"	—N/a	
704	April 1	IU	"Lilac"	7,064	
705	April 8	Rosé	"On the Ground"	7,483	
706	April 15	Astro	"One"	9,097	
—	April 22	No Broadcast or Winner			
707	April 29	NU'EST	"Inside Out"	7,700	
708	May 6	Itzy	"In the Morning"	6,120	
709	May 13	Itzy	"In the Morning"	8,526	
710	May 20	NCT Dream	"Hot Sauce"	10,800	
711	May 27	NCT Dream	"Hot Sauce"	8,275	
712	June 3	NCT Dream	"Hot Sauce"	6,723	
713	June 10	TXT	"0X1=Lovesong (I Know I Love You)"	6,770	
714	June 17	Twice	"Alcohol-Free"	10,123	
715	June 24	Twice	"Alcohol-Free"	—N/a	
716	July 1	Seventeen	"Ready to Love"	7,932	
717	July 8	NCT Dream	"Hello Future"	7,915	
718	July 15	NCT Dream	"Hello Future"	7,002	
—	July 22	No Broadcast or Winner			
719	July 29	Jeon So-yeon	"Beam Beam"	9,322	
—	August 5	No Broadcast or Winner			
720	August 12	Somi	"Dumb Dumb"	7,125	
721	August 19	The Boyz	"Thrill Ride"	—N/a	
722	August 26	Red Velvet	"Queendom"	9,345	
723	September 2	Stray Kids	"Thunderous"	7,180	
724	September 9	Stray Kids	"Thunderous"	9,421	
725	September 16	STAYC	"Stereotype"	8,146	
726	September 23	NCT 127	"Sticker"	—N/a	
727	September 30	NCT 127	"Sticker"	8,755	
728	October 7	NCT 127	"Sticker"	9,200	
729	October 14	Itzy	"Loco"	6,215	
—	October 21	No Broadcast or Winner			
730	October 28	Seventeen	"Rock With You"	6,380	
731	November 4	NCT 127	"Favorite (Vampire)"	7,549	
732	November 11	NCT 127	"Favorite (Vampire)"	7,690	
—	November 18	No Broadcast or Winner			
733	November 25	MAMA Nominees Special; No Winner			
734	December 2	MAMA Nominees Special; No Winner			
—	December 9	No Broadcast or Winner			
—	December 16	No Broadcast or Winner			
—	December 23	No Broadcast or Winner			
—	December 30	No Broadcast or Winner			
