= 11th Gaon Chart Music Awards =

2022 South Korean award ceremony

11th Gaon Chart Music Chart Awards
- Date: January 27, 2022
- Venue: Jamsil Arena, Seoul
- Country: South Korea
- Hosted by: Doyoung; Sieun; Jaejae
- Most awards: BTS (8)
- Most nominations: BTS; IU (8)
- Website: gaonmusicawards.com

The 11th Gaon Chart Music Awards (Korean: 제11회 가온차트 뮤직 어워즈; RR: Je11hui gaonchateu myujik eowojeu) ceremony was held at Jamsil Arena in Seoul on January 27, 2022. It recognized the best artists and recordings, primarily based on Gaon Music Chart of the year from December 1, 2020, to November 30, 2021. The ceremony was hosted by Doyoung, Sieun, and Jaejae.

== Winners and nominees ==
- Winners are listed first and emphasized in bold.
  - Nominees

=== Main awards ===
Artist of the Year – Digital Music
December 2020	January 2021
**Taeyeon – "What Do I Call You"**; Iz*One – "Panorama"; Ben – "Lonely night"; Rain – "Switch on Me" (duet with JYP); Lee Hi – "For You" (featuring Crush)	**IU – "Celebrity"**; (G)I-dle – "Hwaa"; Gyeongseo & MJ – "Let's Have a Drink"; Epik High – "Rosario" (featuring CL and Zico); HyunA – "I'm Not Cool"
February 2021	March 2021
**Shinee – "Don't Call Me"**; Kang Daniel – "Paranoia"; Sunmi – "Tail"; Sechs Kies – "Don't Look Back"; Paul Kim – "Love Letter"	**IU – "Lilac"**; Rosé – "On The Ground"; IU – "Coin"; IU – "Hi Spring Bye"; Lim Young-woong – "My Starry Love"
April 2021	May 2021
**Kang Daniel – "Antidote"**; Itzy – "In the Morning"; Davichi – "Just Hug Me"; Kassy – "I Will Light Your Way"; Ha Dong-qn and Bong-gu – "I Will Be Waiting"	**BTS – "Butter"**; Aespa – "Next Level"; Oh My Girl – "Dun Dun Dance"; Joy – "Hello"; Heize – "Happen"
June 2021	July 2021
**Brave Girls – "Chi Mat Ba Ram"**; Twice – "Alcohol-Free"; NCT Dream – "Hello Future"; Big Mama – "One Day More"; Epik High – "Rain Song" (featuring Colde)	**BTS – "Permission to Dance"**; AKMU – "NAKKA" (with IU); AKMU – "Hey Kid, Close Your Eyes" (with Lee Sun-hee); SG Wannabe – "You're the Best of Me"; Taeyeon – "Weekend"
August 2021	September 2021
**Red Velvet – "Queendom"**; 10cm – "Go Back"; MeloMance – "Go Back"; Jeon Somi – "Dumb Dumb"; Car, the Garden – "Closely Far Away"	**Coldplay & BTS – "My Universe"**; Itzy – "Loco"; NCT 127 – "Sticker"; STAYC – "Stereotype"; Lee Mu-jin – "Fall in Fall"
October 2021	November 2021
**IU – "Strawberry Moon"**; NCT 127 – "Favorite (Vampire)"; Davichi – "First Loss"; Seventeen – "Rock with You"; Aespa – "Savage"	**Twice – "Scientist"**; 10cm – "Yesterday You Left Me"; 2AM – "Should've Known"; Lim Jae-hyun – "I'd Love You Again If I Have A Next Life"; Im Chang-jung – "Nothing Special With The Day"
Artist of the Year – Physical Album
1st Quarter (December 2020 – February 2021)	2nd Quarter (March – May 2021)
**Iz*One – One-reeler / Act IV**; Treasure – The First Step: Treasure Effect; Kim Ho-joong – The Classic Album I – My Favorite Arias; Kim Ho-joong – The Classic Album II – My Favorite Songs; Shinee – Don't Call Me	**NCT Dream – Hot Sauce**; Enhypen – Border: Carnival; Rosé – R; Baekhyun – Bambi; Tomorrow X Together – The Chaos Chapter: Freeze
3rd Quarter (June – August 2021)	4th Quarter (September – November 2021)
**BTS – Butter**; NCT Dream – Hello Future; Stray Kids – Noeasy; Exo – Don't Fight the Feeling; Seventeen – Your Choice	**NCT 127 – Sticker**; NCT 127 – Favorite; Enhypen – Dimension: Dilemma; Stray Kids – Christmas EveL; Seventeen – Attacca
New Artist of the Year
Digital Music	Physical Album
**Lee Mu-jin – "Scent of the Day"**; Kim Hee-jae – "Follow Me"; Shyddoong – "Unexpectedly Shy" (feat. Ravi); D.Ark – "Genius" (feat. Changmo); Lee Chan-won – "Convenience Store"	**Lee Chan-won – Gift**; Omega X – What's Goin' On; TO1 – Re:Born; Mirae – Splash; Epex – Bipolar Pt. 2: Prelude to Love

=== Other awards ===
Other Categories	Winner
Record Production of the Year	IU (EDAM Entertainment) – Lilac
Discovery of the Year – Hiphop	Homies – "Siren Remix"
Discovery of the Year – Hot Trend	STAYC – "ASAP"
Composer of the Year	Ryan S. Jhun
Lyricist of the Year	IU
Performer of the Year – Musical Instrument	Jung Jae-pil (YOUNG)
Performer of the Year – Chorus	Kim Yeon Seo
Style of the Year – Choreography	Son Sung Deuk
Style of the Year – Stylist	Kim Wook
Hot Performance of the Year	Oh My Girl & The Boyz
World Hallyu Star of the Year	Stray Kids
Song of the Year in International Pop	Justin Bieber – "Peaches"
International Rising Star of the Year	The Kid Laroi
Popular Singer of the Year	Standing Egg – "Old Song"
Music Steady Seller of the Year	BTS – "Dynamite"
World Rookie of the Year	Enhypen & Aespa
Top Kit-Seller of the Year	NCT Dream – Hot Sauce
Retail Album of the Year	BTS
Social Hot Star of the Year	BTS
Mubeat Global Choice – Male	BTS
Mubeat Global Choice – Female	Lisa
The Adult Contemporary Music of the Year	Lim Young-woong – "My Starry Love"

== Presenters ==
The list of presenters was announced on January 19, 2022.

Order of the presentation, name of the artist(s), and award(s) they presented
Order	Artist(s)	Presented
1	Tiffany Young	New Artist of the Year (Digital Music, Physical Album)
2	Jung Ji-so	Artist of the Year – Digital Music (December, January, February)
3	Kim Hae-joon & Lee Eun-ji	Popular Singer of the Year + Music Steady Seller of the Year
4	Hani	Artist of the Year – Digital Music (March, April, May) + Top Kit-Seller of the Year
5	Tei & Shin Ji	Discovery of the Year (Hiphop, Hot Trend)
6	Noze	Style of the Year (Choreography, Stylist)
7	Kim Jae-young	Artist of the Year – Digital Music (June, July, August)
8	Oh My Girl's Arin & Jiho	Composer of the Year + Lyricist of the Year
9	Go Eun-ah	Artist of the Year – Physical Album (1st Quarter, 2nd Quarter)
10	Jo Han-chul & Kim Min-seo	Hot Performance of the Year
11	Lee Mu-jin	Performer of the Year (Musical Instrument, Chorus)
12	Kangta	Artist of the Year – Physical Album (3rd Quarter, 4th Quarter)
13	Yoon Sang	The Adult Contemporary Music of the Year + Record Production of the Year

== Performers ==
The lineup was announced on January 11, 2022.

Order of the performance, name of the artist(s), and song(s) they performed
Order	Artist(s)	Song performed
1	Lee Mu-jin	"The Assignment Song" + "Traffic Light"
2	Lee Chan-won	"A Good Day with You" + "Cheer Up"
3	STAYC	"Stereotype" + "ASAP"
4	Homies	"Siren"
5	Standing Egg	"Old Song"
6	Brave Girls	"Chi Mat Ba Ram" + "Rollin'"
7	Red Velvet	"Queendom"
8	Lim Young-woong	"Love Always Run Away" + "My Starry Love"
9	Oh My Girl	"Dun Dun Dance"
10	NCT Dream	"Hello Future" + "Hot Sauce"
11	NCT 127	"Favorite (Vampire)" + "Sticker"
