= 2021 Mnet Asian Music Awards =

23rd edition of the MAMA Awards held in 2021

- Date: December 11, 2021
- Venue: CJ ENM Contents World, Paju, South Korea
- Presented by: TikTok
- Hosted by: Lee Hyori

Highlights
- Most wins: BTS (10)
- Website: 2021 Mnet Asian Music Awards

Television/radio coverage
- Network: Mnet, across CJ E&M channels, and other international networks
- Runtime: 100 minutes (Red carpet); 285 minutes (Main ceremony)

The 2021 Mnet Asian Music Awards ceremony, also known as 2021 MAMA, organized by CJ E&M and broadcast through its music channel Mnet, took place live on December 11, 2021. The ceremony was held at CJ ENM Contents World in Paju, South Korea. The theme for the ceremony was titled as "Make Some Noise". The ceremony was the 23rd in the show's history, and the last to be named as the "Mnet Asian Music Awards," as the show rebranded for the following edition.

== Background ==
On July 20, 2021, it was reported by Ilgan Sports the ceremony is undergoing discussion to be held in Hong Kong despite the ongoing pandemic and travel restrictions. On September 7, it was announced the ceremony would be held at CJ ENM Contents World in Paju, South Korea. This will be the second consecutive year, the ceremony will take place in South Korea only.

On October 13, Mnet announced that Lee Hyori will be hosting the ceremony. She will be the first female host for Mnet Asian Music Awards. In addition, Mnet also announced that the theme of the ceremony titled as "Make Some Noise". Mnet also announced that it will be airing a 7-episode special documentary titled "MAMA: The Original K-pop Awards" from October 28, to celebrate the 12th anniversary of the Mnet Asian Music Awards. According to video teaser posted on Mnet's Twitter, the documentary is expected to feature interviews from Psy, Park Jin-young, Exo's Kai, Twice's Nayeon, Sana, and Jihyo, Mamamoo's Hwasa, Stray Kids, Super Junior, Shinee, and 2NE1.

On November 16, a global press conference was held. It was revealed that the awards ceremony will be an offline event with a limited audience in accordance with government disease prevention guidelines. South Korean-based company, Samil PwC, will be auditing the ceremony. Mnet also announced additional performers including British singer-songwriter Ed Sheeran, the 8 crews of Street Woman Fighter, a reunion stage of Wanna One, and a collaboration stage between members of top fourth-generation K-pop groups.

On December 9, Mnet announced the 2021 MAMA Ambassadors. Rain, Song Joong-ki, Ed Sheeran and Han Ye-ri will deliver the key values that made K-content globally loved by global audiences. On December 11, Mnet released a special album titled, "Do the dance", performed by Lee Hyori on music streaming platforms.

== Performers ==
Ed Sheeran, Street Woman Fighter, and Wanna One were announced as performers on November 16, 2021. The rest of the performers were announced on November 25. On December 5, Kep1er withdrew from the ceremony after a staff member from the group tested positive for COVID-19. Some performances are pre-recorded.

List of performers at 2021 MAMA
Name(s)	Song performed	Stage theme	Ref.
Heeseung (Enhypen), Hyunjin (Stray Kids), Karina (Aespa), Wooyoung (Ateez), Yeji (Itzy), Yeonjun (Tomorrow X Together)	—N/a	"BlooM The Sound"	
Brave Girls	"Rollin'" (Ballad ver.) + "Chi Mat Ba Ram" + "Rollin'"	"Wind of Wish"	
INI	"Rocketeer"	"One Dream"	
Kimura Masaya (INI), Kawashiri Ren (JO1)	—N/a	"One Dream"	
JO1	"Bokura no Kisetsu"	"One Dream"	
Itzy (featuring Heo Sung-tae)	"Loco" (MAMA ver.) + "In the Morning" (MAMA ver.)	"Mission: Be A Good Kitty"	
Jannabi	"A Thought on an Autumn Night" + "I Know Where The Rainbow has Fallen"	"Sailing into the Autumn"	
Gwang-il Jo X Gaeko	"Waterbomb" + "Garion" (MAMA ver.)	"Shout Out If Hip Hop"	
Show Me the Money 10	"Resume" + "82" (MAMA ver.)	"Shout Out If Hip Hop"	
NCT U	"Universe (Let's Play Ball)"	"Welcome to Universe"	
Ateez	"Turbulence" + "The Real" (Heung ver.)	"The Real Journey Begins"	
Tomorrow X Together	"Frost" + "Loser=Lover"	"Break All Myself"	
Stray Kids	"Cheese"	"Stray Kids World Domination"	
3Racha (Bang Chan, Changbin, Han)	"Hey, Monster!"	"Stray Kids World Domination"	
Stray Kids	"Thunderous" (Hero ver.)	"Stray Kids World Domination"	
Ed Sheeran	"Bad Habits" + "Shivers"	"Permission to Challenge"	
NCT Dream	"Hello Future" + "Hot Sauce" (MAMA ver.)	"Dipping in a Dream"	
Wanna One	"Spring Breeze" (MAMA ver.) + "Energetic" + "Burn It Up" + "Beautiful" (Part III)	"1 = 1^{11} (I Miss You)"	
Aespa (featuring Haha)	"Next Level" + "Savage"	"Oh My Gosh! We Are On Another Level"	
Enhypen	"Drunk-Dazed" + "Tamed-Dashed" (MAMA ver.)	"Carnival to Dilemma"	
NCT 127	"Favorite (Vampire)" + "Sticker" (MAMA ver.)	"Eternal Love"	
Lee Hyori X Street Woman Fighter (YGX, LACHICA, WANT, WAYB, CocaNButter, PROWDMON, HolyBang, HOOK)	"Do the Dance"	"Make Some Noise"	

== Presenters ==
2021 Mnet Asian Music Awards host

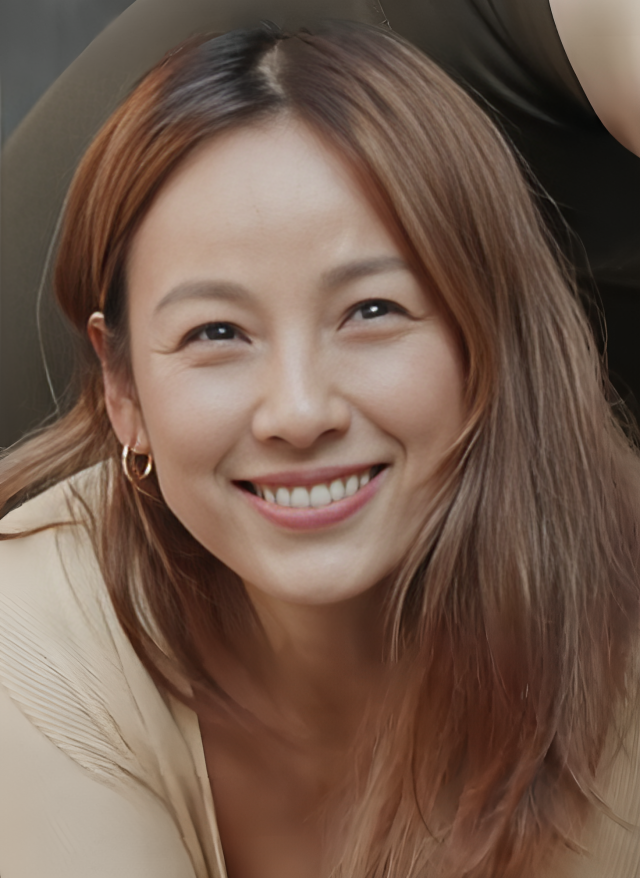
Lee Hyo-ri

The list of presenters was announced on December 7, 2021. Choi Si-won was originally scheduled as a presenter but was diagnosed with COVID-19 a day before the ceremony.

- Lee Hyun-yi & Ahn Hyun-mo – red carpet hosts
- Lee Sun-bin & Lee Do-hyun – Best New Artists (Male & Female)
- Haha, Monika, & Shin Ga-bee – KTO Breakout Artist
- Kim Seo-hyung – Best Band Performance
- Kim Young-dae & Kim Hye-yoon – Best HipHop & Urban Music
- Yeo Jin-goo – Best Dance Female Group
- Jo Jung-suk – Album of the Year
- Heo Sung-tae & Nam Yoon-su – Best OST
- Jo Bo-ah & Ahn Bo-hyun – Worldwide Fans' Choice Top 10
- Rain & Noh Hong-chul – Worldwide Fans' Choice Top 10
- Han Ye-ri – The value of being different segment
- Lee Jung-jae – Worldwide Icon of the Year
- Song Joong-ki – Breaking the Norm
- Kwon Yul – TikTok Favorite Moment
- Tiffany Young & Choi Soo-young – Best Female Group
- Song Joong-ki – Song of the Year
- Uhm Jung-hwa – Artist of the Year

== Criteria ==
=== K-pop categories ===
All songs that have been released from October 29, 2020, to October 31, 2021, are eligible to be nominated.

Division	MAMA professional panel (Local and foreign)	Digital sales	Record sales	Global music video view counts	Global music platform (Apple Music)	Online voting
Artist of the Year	40%	20%	20%	10%	10%	—
Categories by Artist (Note: Best New Male/Female Artist, Best Male/Female Artist, Best Male/Female Group.)	40%	20%	20%	10%	10%	—
Song of the Year	40%	30%	10%	10%	10%	—
Categories by Genre (Note: Best Dance Performance (Solo/Male/Female Group), Best Vocal Performance (Male/Female/Group), Best Hip-hop & Urban Music, Best Band Performance, Best Collaboration, Best OST.)	40%	30%	10%	10%	10%	—
Album of the Year (Note: Only albums with 5 new songs or more.)	40%	10%	40%	—	10%	—
Best Music Video	70%	—	—	30%	—	—
Worldwide Icon of the Year (Note: Pre-voting will be held from November 4 to 22, 2021. Main voting period will be held from November 25 until the live broadcast of the show.)	—	—	—	—	—	80% (MAMA website); 10% (Twitter); 10% (Apple Music Playlist Voting)
Worldwide Fans' Choice Top 10	—	—	—	—	—	80% (MAMA website); 10% (Twitter); 10% (Apple Music Playlist Voting)

=== Asia Music categories ===
Artists from Japan, Greater China, Thailand, Indonesia, and Vietnam who have worked on songs released from October 1, 2020, to September 30, 2021.

=== Professional categories ===
Music experts who participated in the production, creation, activities etc., of K-Pop's records and digital songs released from October 1, 2020, to September 30, 2021.

== Winners and nominees ==
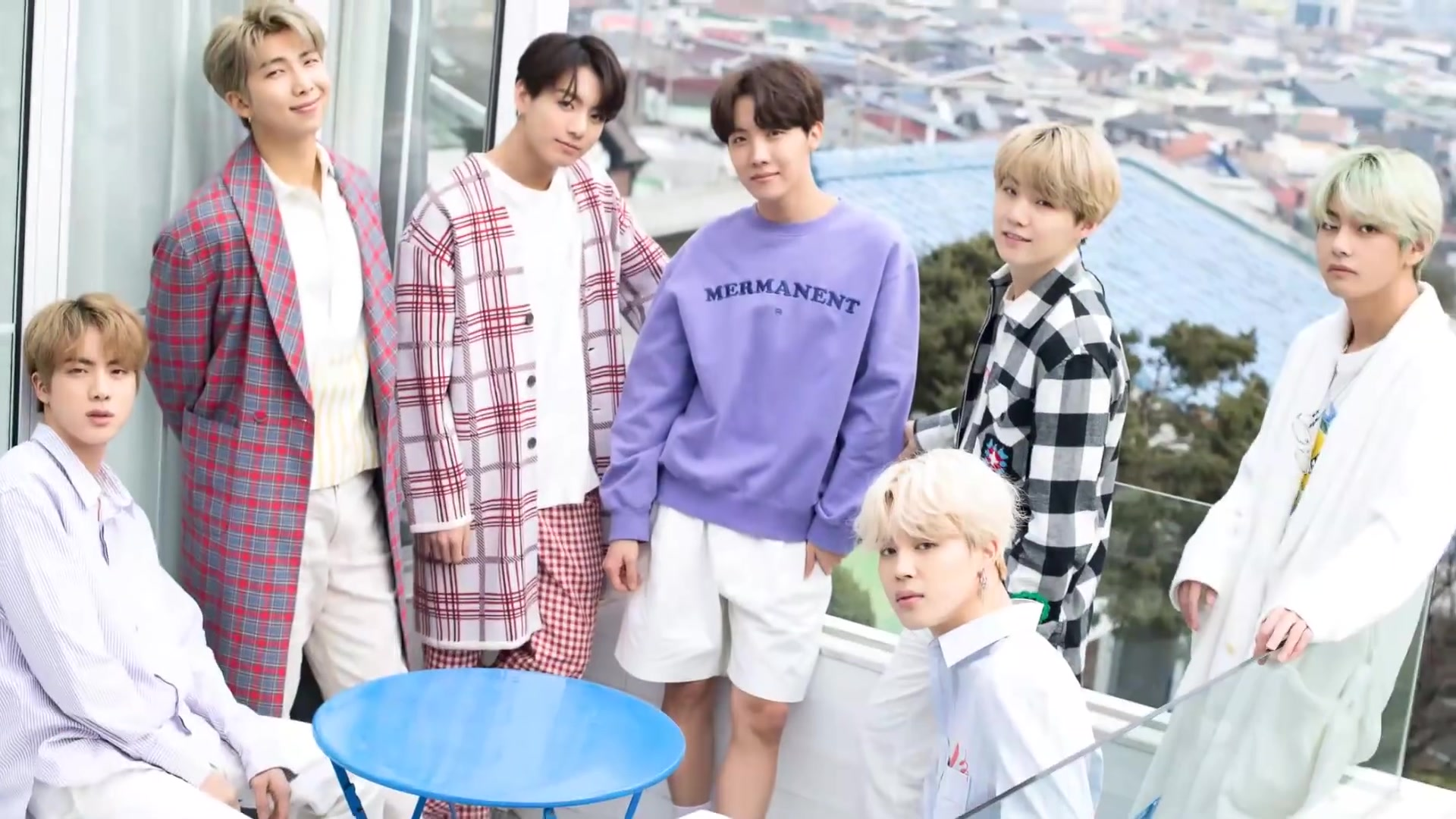
BTS won ten awards, including the Artist of the Year (Daesang), Song of the Year (Daesang), Album of the Year (Daesang), Worldwide Icon of the Year (Daesang), Best Male Group, Best Dance Performance, Best Music Video, Worldwide Fans' Choice Top 10, TikTok Favorite Moment and 2021 Visionary.

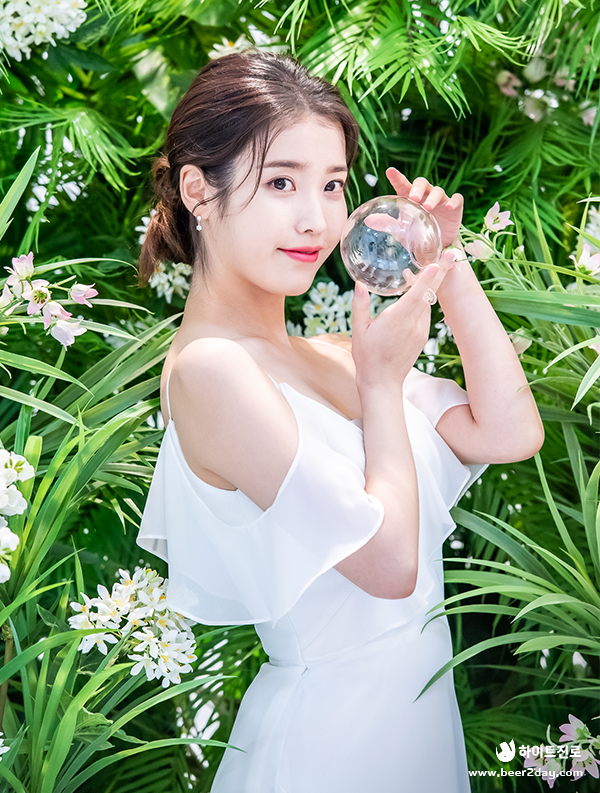
IU won three awards, including Best Female Artist, Best Vocal Performance, and Best Collaboration.

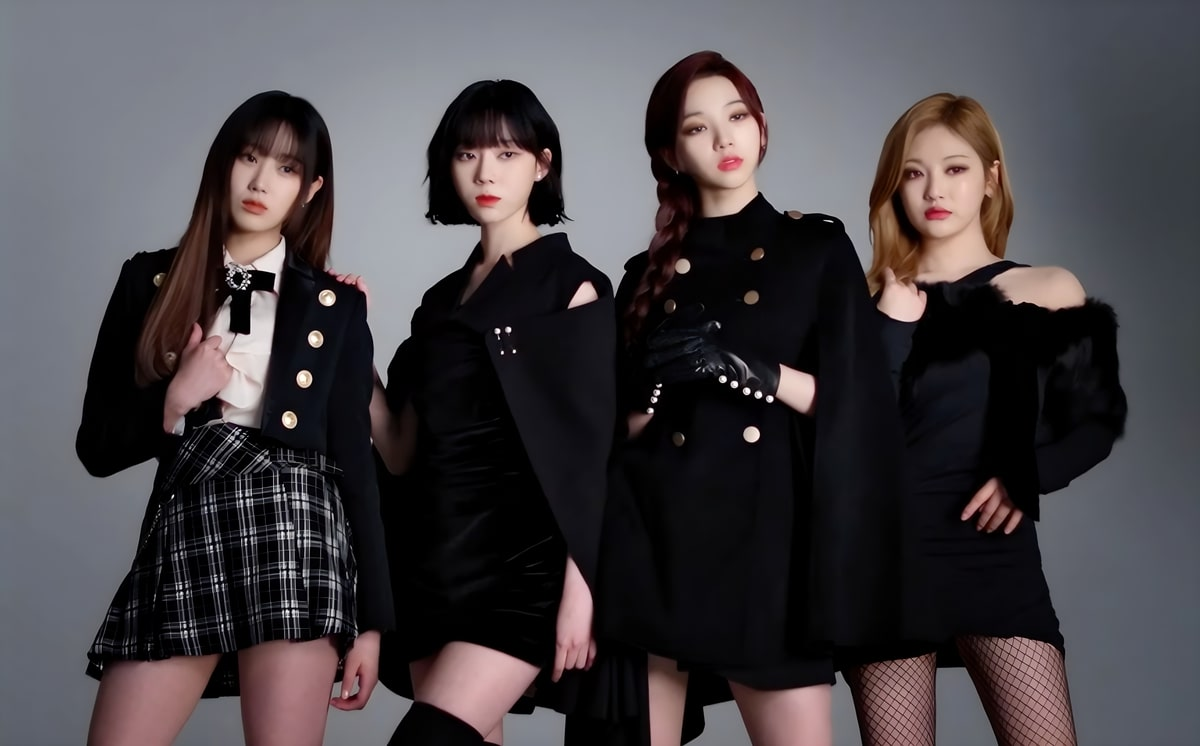
Aespa, Best Dance Performance – Female Group and Best New Female Artist

Winners and nominees are listed in alphabetical order. Winners listed first and highlighted in bold.

Online voting for Worldwide Fans' Choice Top 10 opened on the official website and Twitter on November 4, 2021. Online voting for Worldwide Icon of the Year opened on the official MAMA website and Twitter on November 25, 2021. Voting on the official website and Apple Music ended on December 9, 2021, while voting on Twitter ended during the live broadcast.

=== Main awards ===
The list of nominees for all categories excluding Album of the Year, Worldwide Icon of the Year, and Best Music Video, were announced on November 3, 2021, through the official website.

Artist of the Year (Daesang)	Song of the Year (Daesang)
**BTS**; Aespa; IU; NCT 127; Oh My Girl	**BTS – "Butter"**; Aespa – "Next Level; IU – Celebrity; Lee Mu-jin – "Traffic Light"; Oh My Girl – "Dun Dun Dance"
Album of the Year (Daesang)	Worldwide Icon of the Year (Daesang)
**BTS – Be**; Aespa – Savage; IU – Lilac; NCT 127 – Sticker; NCT Dream – Hot Sauce	**BTS**; Enhypen; Lisa; NCT 127; NCT Dream; Seventeen; Stray Kids; Tomorrow X Together; Treasure; Twice
Best Male Group	Best Female Group
**BTS**; NCT 127; NCT Dream; Seventeen; Stray Kids; Tomorrow X Together	**Twice**; (G)I-dle; Brave Girls; Itzy; Oh My Girl; Red Velvet
Best Male Artist	Best Female Artist
**Baekhyun**; D.O; Kai; Kang Daniel; Lee Mu-jin	**IU**; Heize; Lisa; Rosé; Taeyeon
Best Dance Performance – Male Group	Best Dance Performance – Female Group
**BTS – "Butter"**; NCT 127 – "Sticker"; NCT Dream – "Hot Sauce"; Seventeen – "Ready to Love"; Shinee – "Don't Call Me"; Stray Kids – "Thunderous"	**Aespa – "Next Level"**; Itzy – "In the Morning"; Oh My Girl – "Dun Dun Dance"; Red Velvet – "Queendom"; STAYC – "ASAP"; Twice – "Alcohol-Free"
Best Dance Performance – Solo	Best Vocal Performance
**Rosé – "On The Ground"**; Baekhyun – "Bambi"; Hyuna – "I'm Not Cool"; Jeon Somi – "Dumb Dumb"; Lisa – "Lalisa"; Taeyeon – "Weekend"	**IU – "Celebrity"**; AKMU – "Nakka" (with IU); Davichi – "Just Hug Me"; Heize – "Happen"; Lee Mu-jin – "Traffic Light"
Best OST	Best Collaboration
**Jo Jung-suk – "I Like You" (Hospital Playlist Season 2)**; 10cm – "Borrow Your Night" (Romance 101); Choi Yu-ree – "Wish" (Hometown Cha Cha); Lee Mu-jin – "Rain and You" (Hospital Playlist Season 2); Yang Yo-seob & Jung Eun-ji – "Love Day" (2021) (Romance 101)	**AKMU & IU – "Nakka"**; Coldplay & BTS – "My Universe"; Gaeko & Kwon Jin-ah – "I Feel Like"; Hyolyn & Dasom – "Summer or Summer"; Rain & J.Y. Park – "Switch to Me"
Best New Male Artist	Best New Female Artist
**Enhypen**; Drippin; Epex; Mirae; P1Harmony	**Aespa**; Jo Yu-ri; Kwon Eun-bi; Lightsum; STAYC
Best HipHop & Urban Music	Best Band Performance
**Ash Island – "Melody"**; Changmo – "GJD"; Jessi – "What Type of X"; Mino – "Run Away"; Yumdda – "9ucci"	**Jannabi – "A Thought on an Autumn Night"**; 10cm – "Sleepless in Seoul" (feat. Lee Su-hyun); CNBLUE – "Then, Now and Forever"; Day6 – "You Make Me"; N.Flying – "Moonshot"
Best Music Video
**BTS – "Butter"**

=== Favorite Awards ===
The list of nominees for Worldwide Fans' Choice Top 10, were announced on November 3, 2021, through the official website.

Worldwide Fans' Choice Top 10
**BTS**; **Enhypen**; **Lisa**; **NCT 127**; **NCT Dream**; **Seventeen**; **Stray Kids**; **Tomorrow X Together**; **Treasure**; **Twice**; List of nominated artists: (G)I-dle; Aespa; AKMU; Ash Island; Astro; Ateez; Brave Girls; Chungha; CL; Davichi; Exo; Fromis 9; Heize; Hyuna; iKon; Itzy; IU; Jannabi; Jeon Somi; Jessi; Kang Daniel; Lee Mu-jin; Lee Seung-gi; Loona; Mamamoo; Mino; Monsta X; NU'EST; Oh My Girl; Rain; Red Velvet; Rosé; SF9; Shinee; STAYC; Sunmi; Super Junior; Taeyeon; The Boyz; Weeekly
Favorite Asian Artist	Favorite International Artist
**INI**	**Ed Sheeran**

=== Special awards ===
Category		Winner
Best Asian Artist	Japan	JO1
Best Asian Artist	Mandarin	Accusefive
Best Asian Artist	Thailand	Tilly Birds
Best Asian Artist	Indonesia	Anneth
Best Asian Artist	Vietnam	Quân A.P
Best New Asian Artist	Japan	Ado
Best New Asian Artist	Mandarin	Anson Lo
Best New Asian Artist	Thailand	Sprite X Guygeegee
Best New Asian Artist	Indonesia	Lyodra
Best New Asian Artist	Vietnam	Hoàng Duyên
TikTok Favorite Moment		BTS
KTO Breakout Artist		Brave Girls
2021 Visionary (CJ E&M)		BTS; Aespa; Yoo Jae-suk; Choi Jung-nam; Youn Yuh-jung; Hwang Dong-hyuk

=== Professional Categories ===
Category	Winner	Work
Best Executive Producer of the Year	Bang Si-hyuk	BTS
Best Producer of the Year	Teddy	Lalisa
Best Composer of the Year	Yoo Young-jin	"Savage"
Best Engineer of the Year	Gu Jong-pil & Kwon Nam-woo	"Celebrity"
Best Video Director of the Year	Lumpens	"Butter"
Best Choreographer of the Year	Leejung Lee	"Money"
Best Art Director of the Year	MU:E	"Butter"

=== Multiple Awards ===
The following artist(s) received three or more awards:

Awards	Artist(s)
10	BTS
3	IU
3	Aespa

== Broadcast ==
The ceremony of the 2021 Mnet Asian Music Awards was broadcast live worldwide from Mnet in South Korea, to simulcast across CJ E&M channels; other international networks, and online via Mnet K-pop, Mnet TV, M2, and KCON's YouTube account. The red carpet was broadcast live 2 hours before the main ceremony.

Country	Network	
Worldwide (Note: Restricted access in some countries due to broadcasting rights.)	YouTube (Mnet K-Pop, Mnet TV, M2 & KCON Official)	
United States	KCON USA	
South Korea	Mnet, TVING, tvN STORY, tvN Show	
Japan	Mnet Smart, Mnet Japan, au Smart Pass	
Hong Kong	JOOX, ViuTV, ViuTVsix, viu.tv, NOW Drama	tvN Asia
Macau	ViuTV, ViuTVsix, viu.tv, NOW Drama	tvN Asia
Taiwan	FET Friday Video, FET Mobile Circle app (Far EasTone)	tvN Asia
Philippines	GigaPlay (Smart Communications)	tvN Asia
Singapore	MeWATCH	tvN Asia
Indonesia	Indosiar, Vidio, JOOX	tvN Asia
Malaysia	JOOX, TonTon	tvN Asia
Thailand	JOOX	tvN Asia
Myanmar	tvN Asia	
Maldives	tvN Asia	
Sri Lanka	tvN Asia	
Vietnam	FPT TV, FPT Play, Foxy	
Sub-Saharan Africa	tvN Asia (through DStv)	
