= Sticker (album) =

2021 studio album by NCT 127

- Digital cover

Studio album by NCT 127
- Released: September 17, 2021
- Studios: SM Studios; Sound Pool Studio; Doobdoob Studio
- Genres: Hip hop; R&B; dance; pop
- Length: 38:43
- Languages: Korean; English
- Label: SM
- Producer: Lee Soo-man

NCT 127 chronology
Loveholic (2021)	Sticker (2021)	2 Baddies (2022)

NCT chronology
Hot Sauce (2021)	Sticker (2021)	Universe (2021)

Singles from Sticker
- 1. "Sticker" Released: September 17, 2021

Repackage edition cover
- Digital and Classic version cover

Singles from Favorite
- 1. "Favorite (Vampire)" Released: October 25, 2021

Sticker is the third Korean-language and fourth overall studio album by South Korean boy band NCT 127. It was released on September 17, 2021, by SM Entertainment, distributed by Dreamus in South Korea and Virgin Music in the United States. It follows their Japanese-language EP Loveholic, released in February 2021, and previous Korean-language studio album Neo Zone, released in March 2020. On October 25, the group released a repackaged version of Sticker, titled Favorite, which features three new tracks, including the lead single "Favorite (Vampire)".

The album and its reissue were commercially successful in South Korea, selling a total of 3.58 million copies. Sticker peaked at number 40 on the UK Albums Chart, becoming NCT 127's first appearance on said chart. On the Billboard 200, Sticker peaked at number three and became the highest and longest-charting album by the group. The lead single "Sticker" received mixed reviews from critics, although the album was generally praised. Several publications named it as one of the best K-pop albums from 2021. Sticker won Best Album at the 2021 Asia Artist Awards.

== Background ==
On June 28, 2021, SM Entertainment released a presentation on the future of the company and planned comebacks of their artists during the "SM Congress" event. The presentation indicated that NCT 127 was planning to release a third studio album and repackage before the year's end. At a fanmeet in celebration of the group's fifth anniversary, they confirmed the album would have a September release window.

== Promotion ==
Sticker was teased with a concept trailer titled "Who Is Sticker", released on August 21, which depicted the members of NCT 127 as engineering students by day and computer hackers by night. On August 22, SM Entertainment announced the album's release date as September 17 on the group's social media accounts. On September 10, NCT 127 released a playlist called "Welcome to NCT 127 Sticker, the Enhanced Playlist" exclusively on Spotify. Sticker was officially released on September 17, and the group promoted the album and its title track on The Late Late Show with James Corden.

== Commercial performance ==
=== Sticker ===
On August 24, 2021, after just one day of availability, it was reported that Sticker had surpassed 1,329,000 pre-orders, eventually surpassing 2.2 million pre-orders on the day of release, exceeding their previous career high of 530,000 pre-orders for Neo Zone and setting a new record for artists under SM Entertainment. On September 24, 2021, NCT 127 broke their own sales record to become a double-million seller, with over 2.15 million copies of Sticker sold in just one week. As of November 2021, the album has sold 2.4 million copies. Sticker debuted at number three on the US Billboard 200, selling 58,000 copies in its first week.

=== Favorite ===
On October 25, 2021, it was reported that Favorite surpassed 1,060,000 pre-orders, making it the most pre-ordered repackaged album from SM Entertainment. One week after its release, it was reported that the album has sold 1.1 million copies, bringing the total sales of Sticker to 3.58 million copies.

== Critical reception ==
Professional ratings
Review scores
Source	Rating
The A.V. Club	B+
Clash	8/10
IZM	3/5 stars
NME	3/5 stars

The A.V. Club's Shanicka Anderson reviewed the album and given it B + writing "with the album’s jarring use of such abrasive samples—especially throughout its lead single—it’s hard to imagine a world where any of that works and sounds good. But by blending these unlikely sounds with rich, powerful harmonies and solid rap verses, NCT 127 strikes a sweet balance and delivers an album that is fiercely creative and incredibly self-possessed."

Lucy Ford writing for Clash, "'Sticker' has far less cohesion as you listen through, and whilst the whiplash of genres feels deliberate in regards to the overall message of the album (that the group can be a sticker, pulled and placed whatever way you want them to go) it’s not an entirely relaxing listening experience. But I’d argue that this isn’t a mishap or an overshooting of their own shtick, but a declarative statement that they’re in on the joke and will ultimately be the last ones laughing."

IZM's Jeong Da-yeol started that "as the taste was enhanced only with fragmentary techniques, it lost its original style. 'Sticker', which has simple instrumental compositions and no variation to speak of. The uses Taeyong and Mark's rapping just to the extent of driving the vocalists' elegance. Beyond the simple distribution of parts, hip-hop, the root of NCT's worldview, is not at the center. This situation extends throughout the album and even hinders the immersion of ballad tracks like 'Tomorrow's Me' where the piano gently flows. As a result, like the album cover, all the members lost their color," regardless, he praised the usage of the "cultural technology" and how the producers were not hesitate to "take on challenges to lead trends". Sticker was included in unranked lists of the best albums of 2021 by The New York Times and Nylon. The repackage Favorite was ranked among the best K-pop albums of the year by Harper's Bazaar (7th) and South China Morning Post (11th).

== Accolades ==
Awards and nominations for Sticker and Favorite
Organization	Year	Award	Work	Result	Ref.
Asia Artist Awards	2021	Album of the Year (Daesang)	Sticker	Won	
Asian Pop Music Awards	2021	Top 20 Albums of the Year (Overseas)	Sticker	Won	
Asian Pop Music Awards	2021	Best Album of the Year (Overseas)	Sticker	Nominated	
Gaon Chart Music Awards	2022	Album of the Year — 4th Quarter	Sticker	Won	
Gaon Chart Music Awards	2022	Album of the Year — 4th Quarter	Favorite	Nominated	
Golden Disc Awards	2022	Album Bonsang	Sticker	Won	
Hanteo Music Awards	2021	Initial Chodong Record Award	Sticker	Won	
Mnet Asian Music Awards	2021	Album of the Year	Sticker	Nominated	

== Track listing ==
Sticker track listing
No.	Title	Lyrics	Music	Arrangement	Length
1.	"Sticker"	Yoo Young-jin; Taeyong; Mark	Yoo Young-jin; Dem Jointz; Calixte; Prince Chapelle; Ryan S. Jhun	Yoo Young-jin; Dem Jointz; Ryan S. Jhun	3:47
2.	"Lemonade"	Han Yeo-reum (Joombas); Teuru (Joombas)	Charles "Rokman" Rhodes; Benji Bae	Rokman	3:10
3.	"Breakfast"	Jeong Ha-ri (Joombas)	Simon Petrén; Andreas Öberg; Ninos Hanna	Simon Petrén	3:32
4.	"Focus" (같은 시선; Gateun siseon; 'Same Gaze')	Lee Chang-hyeok	Jaicko Lawrence; Oluwayomi Emmanuel Oredein; Darius Michael Bryant; Otha "Vaskeen" Davis III; Ryan S. Jhun	Droyd; LES Alliance; Ryan S. Jhun	3:24
5.	"The Rainy Night" (내일의 나에게; Naeirui naege; 'To Me Tomorrow' (sung by Taeil, Doyoung, Jaehyun, Jungwoo and Haechan)	Jung Yoon-hwa; Seo Hye-ri	Softserveboy; Sqvare; Hwan Yang; Ryan S. Jhun	Ryan S. Jhun; Hwan Yang	3:19
6.	"Far"	Sahara (Joombas)	Alexander Karlsson (JeL); Alexej Viktorovitch (JeL); Alex Nese	JeL	3:36
7.	"Bring the Noize"	Kim Boo-min; sokodomo	Hitchhiker; Kim Boo-min; Aventurina King; John Fulford	Hitchhiker	3:42
8.	"Magic Carpet Ride"	Jo Yoon-kyung	Harvey Mason Jr.; Patrick "J. Que" Smith; Britt Burton; Dewain Whitmore	Harvey Mason Jr.	3:38
9.	"Road Trip"	Le'mon (Joombas); Ellie Suh (Joombas); San (Vendors)	Erik Lidbom; MLC	Erik Lidbom	3:35
10.	"Dreamer"	Baek Geum-min	Mich Hansen; Daniel Davidsen (PhD); Peter Wallevik (PhD); Boy Matthews; Asia Whiteacre	Cutfather; PhD	3:29
11.	"Promise You" (다시 만나는 날; Dasi mannaneun nal; 'The Day We Meet Again')	ZNEE (Joombas); Rick Bridges	Noah Conrad; Roland "Rollo" Spreckley; Tony Ferrari; Ryan Linvill	Noah Conrad; Ryan Linvill	3:31
Total length:					38:43

Favorite track listing
No.	Title	Lyrics	Music	Arrangement	Length
1.	"Favorite (Vampire)"	Kenzie	Kenzie; Rodney "Darkchild" Jerkins; Rodnae "Chikk" Bell	Kenzie; Rodney "Darkchild" Jerkins	3:34
2.	"Sticker"	Yoo Young-jin; Taeyong; Mark	Yoo Young-jin; Dem Jointz; Calixte; Prince Chapelle; Ryan S. Jhun	Yoo Young-jin; Dem Jointz; Ryan S. Jhun	3:47
3.	"Love on the Floor"	Ku Tae-woo	Michael Jiminez; Jeremy "Tay" Jasper; Dylan Huling; Timothy "BOS" Bullock; Hautboi Rich	Timothy "BOS" Bullock	3:38
4.	"Lemonade"	Han Yeo-reum (Joombas); Teuru (Joombas)	Charles "Rokman" Rhodes; Benji Bae	Rokman	3:10
5.	"Breakfast"	Jeong Ha-ri (Joombas)	Simon Petrén; Andreas Öberg; Ninos Hanna	Simon Petrén	3:32
6.	"Pilot"	Mingtion; Junny	Mingtion; Junny	Mingtion	3:29
7.	"Focus" (같은 시선)	Lee Chang-hyeok	Jaicko Lawrence; Oluwayomi Emmanuel Oredein; Darius Michael Bryant; Otha "Vaskeen" Davis III; Ryan S. Jhun	Droyd; Les Alliance; Ryan S. Jhun	3:24
8.	"The Rainy Night" (내일의 나에게)	Jung Yoon-hwa; Seo Hye-ri	Softserveboy; Sqvare; Hwan Yang; Ryan S. Jhun	Ryan S. Jhun; Hwan Yang	3:19
9.	"Far"	Sahara (Joombas)	Alexander Karlsson (JeL); Alexej Viktorovitch (JeL); Alex Nese	JeL	3:36
10.	"Bring the Noize"	Kim Boo-min	Sokodomo; Hitchhiker; Kim Boo-min; Aventurina King; John Fulford	Hitchhiker	3:42
11.	"Magic Carpet Ride"	Jo Yoon-kyung	Harvey Mason Jr.; Patrick "J. Que" Smith; Britt Burton; Dewain Whitmore	Harvey Mason Jr.	3:38
12.	"Road Trip"	Le'mon (Joombas); Ellie Suh (Joombas); San (Vendors)	Erik Lidbom; MLC	Erik Lidbom	3:35
13.	"Dreamer"	Baek Geum-min	Mich Hansen; Daniel Heloy Davidsen; Daniel Davidsen (PhD); Peter Wallevik (PhD); Boy Matthews; Asia Whiteacre	Cutfather; PhD	3:29
14.	"Promise You" (다시 만나는 날)	ZNEE (Joombas); Rick Bridges	Noah Conrad; Roland "Rollo" Spreckley; Tony Ferrari; Ryan Linvill	Noah Conrad; Ryan Linvill	3:31
Total length:					49:34

== Credits and personnel ==
Credits adapted from liner notes of Sticker and Favorite.

=== Sticker ===
==== Studio ====
- SM Booming System – recording, mixing, digital editing (track 1), engineered for mix (track 1–2)
- SM LVYIN Studio – recording (track 2), mixing (track 5), engineered for mix (track 2, 9)
- SM Yellow Tail Studio – recording (track 2, 6), engineered for mix (track 5–7)
- SM Ssam Studio – recording (track 2, 4, 6), digital editing (track 10), engineered for mix (track 3, 8, 10–11)
- SM Blue Ocean Studio – mixing (track 8–9, 11)
- SM Blue Cup Studio – mixing (track 2, 7)
- SM Big Shot Studio – mixing (track 4, 10), engineered for mix (track 4)
- SM Concert Hall Studio – mixing (track 3, 6)
- SM Starlight Studio – digital editing (track 2, 7)
- Sound Pool Studio – recording (track 10–11), digital editing (track 6, 11)
- Doobdoob Studio – recording (track 3–5, 7–9, 11), digital editing (track 5)
- Sonic Korea – mastering (track 1)
- 821 Sound Mastering – mastering (track 2–11)

==== Personnel ====
- NCT 127 – vocals (all tracks), background vocals (track 7)
  - Taeil – background vocals (track 5–6)
  - Doyoung – background vocals (track 3–5, 8–10)
  - Jaehyun – background vocals (track 5, 10)
  - Haechan – background vocals (track 2, 5, 10)
  - Johnny – background vocals (track 10)
- Yoo Young-jin – vocal directing, background vocals, recording, mixing, digital editing (track 1), engineered for mix (track 1–2), music and sound supervisor (all tracks)
- Kim Boo-min – vocal directing (track 7)
- Sokodomo – rap vocal director (track 7)
- Prince Chapelle – background vocals (track 1)
- Calixte – background vocals (track 1)
- Simon Petrén – background vocals (track 3)
- Ninos Hanna – background vocals (track 3)
- Jaicko Lawrence – background vocals (track 4)
- Alexander Karlsson (JeL) – background vocals (track 6)
- Alex Nese – composition, background vocals (track 6)
- Hitchhiker – vocal directing (track 7)
- Boy Matthews – background vocals (track 10)
- Asia Whiteacre – background vocals (track 10)
- Noah Conrad – background vocals (track 11)
- Ryan Linvill – background vocals (track 11)
- GDLO – vocal directing (track 2, 10), background vocals (track 10), digital editing (track 2), Pro Tools operating (track 2)
- Seo Mi-rae (ButterFly) – vocal directing (track 3–4, 8–9), digital editing (track 3–4, 8–9), Pro Tools operating (track 3–4, 8–9)
- Lee Joo-myung – vocal directing, Pro Tools operating (track 5)
- Choo Dae-gwan – vocal directing, Pro Tools operating (track 6)
- Joo Chan-yang – vocal directing, background vocals (track 11)
- Lee Ji-hong – recording (track 2), mixing (track 5), engineered for mix (track 2, 9)
- Noh Min-ji – recording (track 2, 6), engineered for mix (track 5–7)
- Kang Eun-ji – recording (track 2, 4, 6), digital editing (track 10), engineered for mix (track 3, 8, 10–11)
- Jung Ho-jin – recording (track 10–11), digital editing (track 6, 11)
- Kim Cheol-sun – mixing (track 8–9, 11)
- Jung Eui-seok – mixing (track 2, 7)
- Lee Min-gyu – mixing (track 4, 10), engineered for mix (track 4)
- Nam Koong-jin – mixing (track 3, 6)
- Jung Yu-ra – digital editing (track 2, 7)
- Eugene Kwon – recording (track 3–4, 7–9)
- Jung Woo-young – recording (track 5, 11), digital editing (track 5)
- Kim Ye-ji – recording (track 3, 8)
- Kim Ji-hyun – recording (track 4, 9)
- Jeon Hoon – mastering (track 1)
- Shin Soo-min – mastering assistant (track 1)
- Kwon Nam-woo – mastering (track 2–11)

=== Favorite ===
==== Studio ====
- SM Booming System – recording, mixing, digital editing (track 2), engineered for mix (track 2, 4)
- SM LVYIN Studio – recording (track 1, 4), mixing (track 8), engineered for mix (track 1, 4, 12)
- SM Yellow Tail Studio – (track 1, 4, 9), engineered for mix (track 6, 8–10)
- SM SSAM Studio – recording (track 4, 7, 9), digital editing (track 13), engineered for mix (track 5, 11, 13–14)
- SM Blue Ocean Studio – mixing (track 6, 11–12, 14)
- SM Blue Cup Studio – mixing (track 1, 4, 10)
- SM Big Shot Studio – mixing (track 3, 7, 13), engineered for mix (track 3, 7)
- SM Concert Hall Studio – mixing (track 5, 9)
- SM Starlight Studio – recording (track 3), digital editing (track 3–4, 10)
- Sound Pool Studio – recording (track 13–14), digital editing (track 1, 3, 9, 14)
- Doobdoob Studio – recording (track 3, 5, 7–8, 10–12, 14), digital editing (track 8)
- Sonic Korea – mastering (track 2)
- 821 Sound Mastering – mastering (track 1, 3–14)

==== Personnel ====
- NCT 127 – vocals (all tracks), background vocals (track 1, 3, 6, 10)
  - Taeil – background vocals (track 8–9)
  - Doyoung – background vocals (track 5, 7–8, 11–13)
  - Jaehyun – background vocals (track 8, 13)
  - Haechan – background vocals (track 4, 8, 13)
  - Johnny – background vocals (track 13)
- Kenzie – vocal directing (track 1)
- Yoo Young-jin – vocal directing, background vocals, recording, mixing, digital editing (track 2), engineered for mix (track 2, 4), music and sound supervisor (all tracks)
- Mingtion – vocal directing, digital editing (track 6)
- Junny – vocal directing, background vocals (track 6)
- Kim Boo-min – vocal directing (track 10)
- sokodomo – rap vocal director (track 10)
- Prince Chapelle – background vocals (track 2)
- Calixte – background vocals (track 2)
- Simon Petrén – background vocals (track 5)
- Ninos Hanna – background vocals (track 5)
- Jaicko Lawrence – background vocals (track 7)
- Alexander Karlsson (JeL) – background vocals (track 9)
- Alex Nese – background vocals (track 9)
- Hitchhiker – vocal directing (track 10)
- Boy Matthews – background vocals (track 13)
- Asia Whiteacre – background vocals (track 13)
- Noah Conrad – background vocals (track 14)
- Ryan Linvill – background vocals (track 14)
- GDLO – vocal directing (track 4, 13), background vocals (track 13), digital editing (track 4), Pro Tools operating (track 4)
- Seo Mi-rae (ButterFly) – vocal directing (track 3, 5, 7, 11–12), digital editing (track 5–7, 11–12), Pro Tools operating (track 5–7, 11–12), background vocals (track 3)
- Lee Joo-myung – vocal directing, Pro Tools operating (track 8)
- Choo Dae-gwan – vocal directing, Pro Tools operating (track 9)
- Joo Chan-yang – vocal directing, background vocals (track 14)
- Oiaisle – background vocals (track 1, 3)
- Lee Ji-hong – recording (track 1, 4), mixing (track 8), engineered for mix (track 1, 4, 12)
- Noh Min-ji – recording (track 1, 4, 9), engineered for mix (track 6, 8–10)
- Kang Eun-ji – recording (track 4, 7, 9), digital editing (track 13), engineered for mix (track 5, 11, 13–14)
- Jung Ho-jin – recording (track 13–14), digital editing (track 1, 3, 9, 14)
- Kim Cheol-sun – mixing (track 6, 11–12, 14)
- Jung Eui-seok – mixing (track 1, 4, 10)
- Lee Min-gyu – mixing (track 3, 7, 13), engineered for mix (track 3, 7)
- Nam Koong-jin – mixing (track 5, 9)
- Jung Yu-ra – recording (track 3), digital editing (track 3–4, 10)
- Eugene Kwon – recording (track 5–7, 10–12)
- Jung Woo-young – recording (track 3, 8, 14), digital editing (track 8)
- Kim Ye-ji – recording (track 5, 11)
- Kim Ji-hyun – recording (track 7, 12)
- Lee Kyung-min – recording (track 3)
- Jeon Hoon – mastering (track 2)
- Shin Soo-min – mastering assistant (track 2)
- Kwon Nam-woo – mastering (track 1, 3–14)

== Charts ==
=== Weekly charts ===
Weekly chart performance for both Sticker and Favorite
Chart (2021)	Peak position	
Chart (2021)	Sticker	Favorite
Australian Albums (ARIA)	16	—
Austrian Albums (Ö3 Austria)	14	—
Belgian Albums (Ultratop Flanders)	39	164
Belgian Albums (Ultratop Wallonia)	94	164
Croatian International Albums (HDU)	4	—
Finnish Albums (Suomen virallinen lista)	25	—
French Albums (SNEP)	163	—
German Albums (Offizielle Top 100)	16	—
Hungarian Albums (MAHASZ)	22	—
Japanese Albums (Oricon)	1	—
Japanese Hot Albums (Billboard Japan)	9	3
Scottish Albums (Official Charts)	11	—
South Korean Albums (Gaon)	1	2
Spanish Albums (PROMUSICAE)	65	—
Swiss Albums (Schweizer Hitparade)	37	94
UK Albums (Official Charts)	40	—
US Billboard 200	3	—
US Independent Albums (Billboard)	1	—
US Indie Store Album Sales (Billboard)	4	—
US World Albums (Billboard)	1	—

=== Monthly charts ===
Monthly chart performance for both Sticker and Favorite
Chart (2021)	Peak position	
Chart (2021)	Sticker	Favorite
Japanese Albums (Oricon)	4	—
South Korean Albums (Gaon)	1	3

=== Year-end charts ===
Year-end chart performance for Sticker and Favorite
Chart (2021)	Position	
Chart (2021)	Sticker	Favorite
Japanese Albums (Oricon)	26	—
South Korean Albums (Gaon)	2	13
US World Albums (Billboard)	13	—
Chart (2022)	Position	
US Top Album Sales (Billboard)	33	—
US World Albums (Billboard)	9	—

== Certifications and sales ==
Sticker & Favorite
Region	Certification	Certified units/sales
Japan (Sticker)	—	138,771
South Korea (KMCA) (Sticker)	2× Million	2,434,914
South Korea (KMCA) (Favorite)	3× Platinum	934,986
South Korea (Favorite) (Kit version)	—	231,958

== Release history ==
Release dates and formats for Sticker
Region	Date	Format	Label	Ref.
Various	September 17, 2021	Digital download; streaming	SM	
South Korea	September 17, 2021	CD	SM	
United Kingdom	September 17, 2021	CD	SM	
United States	September 17, 2021	CD	Virgin	
