= Sticker (song) =

2021 single by NCT 127

- iScream remixes cover

Single by NCT 127

from the album Sticker
- Language: Korean; English
- Released: September 17, 2021
- Studio: SM Booming System, Seoul
- Genre: Experimental Hip hop
- Length: 3:47
- Label: SM; Dreamus
- Composers: Dem Jointz; Calixte; Prince Chapelle; Ryan S. Jhun; Yoo Young-jin
- Lyricists: Taeyong; Mark; Yoo Young-jin

NCT 127 singles chronology
| "Save" (2021) | "Sticker" (2021) | "Favorite (Vampire)" (2021) |

NCT singles chronology
| "Hello Future" (2021) | "Sticker" (2021) | "Favorite (Vampire)" (2021) |

Music video
- "Sticker" on YouTube

"Sticker" is a song recorded by South Korean boy group NCT 127 for their third studio album of the same name. Composed by frequent production group and collaborator Dem Jointz, Calixte, Prince Chapelle, Ryan S. Jhun and Yoo Young-jin with lyrical composition by the latter and members Taeyong and Mark, the "experimental" hip-hop track was released digitally on September 17, 2021 as the lead single from the album by SM Entertainment. An accompanying music video was released on the same release date, which depicts a "futuristic/space cowboy" concept.

"Sticker" became the group's second top-five hit on the Gaon Digital Chart, while becoming their eleventh top-five entry on the US World Digital Song Sales chart. It is also NCT 127's first entry on the Global 200 chart, where it peaked at number 101. "Sticker" achieved ten wins in South Korean music programs, becoming the most-awarded song by NCT 127 and by an NCT sub-unit.

== Background ==
"Sticker" was composed by Dem Jointz, Calixthe, Prince Chapelle, Ryan S. Jhun, Yoo Young-jin. Dem Jointz had also co-produced NCT 127's previous singles "Cherry Bomb," "Kick It," and "Punch." The song features a prominent flute sound and a "minimal" and "subdued" production. The group found the song surprising and difficult to master. Member and co-lyricist Taeyong noted in a behind-the-scenes video that he felt that he was "being punished" and "rebuked" for a song for the first time due to its difficulty in pulling off the song. Member and vocalist Doyoung shared it was their first time where they "dived deep" with Yoo Young-jin while recording the song, with Yoo encouraging the group's rappers Taeyong and Mark to write the song's rap lyrics to "bring out the NCT vibe" with the group in mind. In an interview on The Travis Mills Show, member Johnny said listeners can expect to be surprised with the flute melody, while Mark described it as a song that "has a lot of impact and a lot of dynamics" that they have "never touched before." Dem Jointz attributed the song's odd structure to “just being different. You want to stand out, but at the end of the day, you still want everybody to get what you’re doing." He also added that the flute sound "makes you get down and boogie." He ultimately called it one of his favorite tracks, saying that he "feels as strong about this record as I do [for] 'Kick It.'"

== Critical reception ==
"Sticker" was ranked amongst the best K-pop songs of 2021 by Lifestyle Inquirer (5th), Tonplein (22nd), NME (24th), Paper (26th), Teen Vogue and Tone Deaf (both unranked).

== Commercial performance ==
In South Korea, the song debuted at number 17 on the Gaon Digital Chart for the issue dated October 12–18, 2021 and peaked at number 5 in its second week. It debuted at number 25 and number 55 on the Billboard K-pop Hot 100 and Japan Hot 100, respectively, for the issue dated October 2. In Singapore, the song debuted at number 16 on the RIAS's Top Regional Chart for the issue dated September 17–23. In the United States, the song debuted at number 5 on the Billboard World Digital Song Sales chart for the issue dated October 2. It also debuted at number 101 on the Billboard Global 200 and at number 53 on the Billboard Global Excl. US during the same week. In Singapore, the song debuted at number 16 on the RIAS's Top Regional Chart in the chart issue dated September 17–23.

== Music video ==
The music video for "Sticker" was released at 13:00 KST on September 17, 2021, alongside the single and album release. The high-budget music video depicts a "futuristic/space cowboy" concept with colorful set designs, use of CGI, camerawork transitions, and the members singing and dancing throughout different sets. The set is noted for its city-style, video game elements, and use of neon lights accompanied by CGI, which NME describes as "Las Vegas-esque." On YouTube, "Sticker" became the fastest music video by an SM Entertainment artist to surpass 1 million views, which it achieved in only 21 minutes, despite its 13:00 KST release when most fans from Asia are still at school or work. It also surpassed 27 million views and 1.4 million likes within 24 hours, breaking the record for the second most-viewed NCT music video in the first 24 hours at the time, and the most for NCT 127, until the release of "2 Baddies" in 2022.

== Credits and personnel ==
Credits adapted from the liner notes of Sticker.

Studio

- SM Booming System – recording, digital editing, engineered for mix, mixing
- Sonic Korea – mastering

Personnel

- SM Entertainment – executive producer
- Lee Soo-man – producer
- Lee Sung-soo – production director, executive supervisor
- Tak Young-jun – executive supervisor
- NCT 127 – vocals
  - Taeyong – lyrics
  - Mark – lyrics
- Yoo Young-jin – producer, lyrics, composition, arrangement, vocal directing, background vocals, recording, digital editing, engineered for mix, mixing, music and sound supervisor
- Dem Jointz – producer, composition, arrangement
- Ryan S. Jhun – producer, composition, arrangement
- Prince Chapelle – composition, background vocals
- Calixte – composition, background vocals
- Jeon Hoon – mastering
- Shin Soo-min – mastering assistant

== Accolades ==
"Sticker" won 10 first place music program awards, including a triple crown on M Countdown. It was nominated for Best Dance Performance – Male Group at the 2021 Mnet Asian Music Awards and Song of the Year – September at the 11th Gaon Chart Music Awards.

Music program awards
| Program | Date | Ref. |
|---|---|---|
| M Countdown | September 23, 2021 | |
| M Countdown | September 30, 2021 | |
| M Countdown | October 7, 2021 | |
| Music Bank | September 24, 2021 | |
| Music Bank | October 1, 2021 | |
| Show! Music Core | September 25, 2021 | |
| Show! Music Core | October 2, 2021 | |
| The Show | September 28, 2021 | |
| Show Champion | September 29, 2021 | |
| Inkigayo | October 3, 2021 | |

== Charts ==
=== Weekly charts ===
Weekly chart performance for "Sticker"
| Chart (2021) | Peak position |
|---|---|
| Global 200 (Billboard) | 101 |
| Japan (Japan Hot 100) | 55 |
| Singapore (RIAS Regional) | 16 |
| South Korea (Gaon) | 5 |
| South Korea (K-pop Hot 100) | 25 |
| US World Digital Song Sales (Billboard) | 5 |

=== Monthly charts ===
Monthly chart performance for "Sticker"
| Chart (2021) | Peak position |
|---|---|
| South Korea (Gaon) | 29 |
| South Korea (K-pop Hot 100) | 66 |

== Release history ==
Release dates and formats for "Sticker"
| Region | Date | Format | Label |
|---|---|---|---|
| Various | September 17, 2021 | Digital download; streaming | SM Entertainment; Dreamus |

== See also ==
- List of Music Bank Chart winners (2021)
