= Favorite (Vampire) =

2021 single by NCT 127

Single by NCT 127

from the album Favorite
- Language: Korean
- Released: October 25, 2021
- Studio: SM LVYIN Studio; SM Yellow Tail Studio
- Genre: R&B; pop; hip hop
- Length: 3:34
- Label: SM
- Composers: Kenzie; Rodney "Darkchild" Jerkins; Rodnae "Chikk" Bell
- Lyricist: Kenzie

NCT 127 singles chronology
"Sticker" (2021)	"Favorite (Vampire)" (2021)	"2 Baddies" (2022)

NCT singles chronology
"Sticker" (2021)	"Favorite (Vampire)" (2021)	"Universe (Let's Play Ball)" (2021)

Music video
- "Favorite (Vampire)" on YouTube

"Favorite (Vampire)" is a song that was recorded by South Korean boy band NCT 127 and was released as the lead single from the repackaged edition of their third studio album Sticker (2021) on October 25, 2021. It is primarily a R&B track that incorporates a hip-hop production. It is characterized by whistle sounds and harmonic vocals. The song was written by Rodnae "Chikk" Bell, Kenzie, and Darkchild.

== Background and release ==
On June 29, 2021, Lee Soo-man revealed during the SM Congress 2021 that NCT 127 was planning to release a third studio album followed by a repackage edition. After wrapping up promotions for their previous single, Sticker, SM Entertainment confirmed the release date and opened pre-orders for the album. On October 9, a release schedule was announced on the group's official social media accounts. A mood sampler for the "Classic" version of the physical album was posted on October 12, followed by the release of the first batch of individual teaser photos on October 13. On October 16, a mood sampler for the "Catharsis" version was posted, followed by the related individual teaser photos. The last batch of teaser photos was revealed on October 24 alongside the music video teaser. The song was officially released on October 25, 2021 along with Favorite.

== Composition ==
"Favorite (Vampire)" was composed by Kenzie, Rodney "Darkchild" Jerkins and Rodnae "Chikk" Bell. Kenzie also wrote the Korean lyrics for the song and participated in the arrangement alongside Darkchild. Musically, it is an R&B and pop track with hip-hop and trap-inspired production and an "addictive signature whistle sound and rich harmonic vocals". Shanicka Anderson of The A.V. Club has also described it as a "well-rounded" R&B track that "builds to an explosive chorus with layered harmonies" and "features a gentle whistling sample". Ashlee Mitchell of Hypebae described the track as a "mixture of pop, hip-hop, dance and contemporary R&B" with a "nostalgic chorus that reminds listeners of an early 2000s hit". The song was composed in the key of F minor with a tempo of 150 beats per minute. A dance break was added in the music video version of the song, element that was excluded from the digital and streaming version. The lyrics dramatically express that "even at the end of a tragic love that leads to catastrophe, the other person remains my everything and my joy".

== Commercial performance ==
In South Korea, the song debuted at number 2 on the Gaon Digital Chart for the issue dated October 24–30, 2021. The song debuted at number 43 on the Billboard's K-pop Hot 100 chart for the issue dated November 6, 2021. In Japan, the song debuted at number 56 on the Billboard Japan Hot 100 chart for the issue dated October 30, 2021. In Singapore, the song debuted at number 19 on the RIAS's Top Regional Chart for the issue dated October 22–28, 2021. In the United States, the song debuted at number 8 on the Billboard World Digital Song Sales chart for the issue dated November 6, 2021. It also debuted at number 186 on the Billboard Global 200 for the issue dated November 6, 2021 and at number 96 on the Billboard Global Excl. US for the issue dated November 6, 2021.

== Critical reception ==
Carmen Chin of NME noted how the "completely sublime vocal performance from NCT 127" and the elegant "fusion of the member’s different voices" make ‘Favorite (Vampire)’’s chorus "one of their best yet". Comparing it with "Sticker", she commented how the "hip-hop and trap-inspired verses blend much more naturally with the emotion-driven pre-chorus and hook’s whistle melody". Writing for Nylon, Tanu I. Raj also compared the track to NCT 127's previous release and described the two as "polar opposite approaches to love". She said that "whereas “Sticker” is bombastic and courts with overconfident energy, “Favorite (Vampire)” is subdued and dares to lay oneself bare, giving in to the vulnerability that love demands". Tamar Herman of South China Morning Post said it emphasizes "NCT 127's harmonius vocals, while still playing around with the sort of experimental style the group is known for".

It was named one of the best K-pop songs of 2021 by PhilStar Life (8th), South China Morning Post (10th), Tonplein (43rd), and Teen Vogue (unranked).

== Music video ==
A short story inspired by the lyrics of the song featuring images and videos of the members was posted from the 20th to the 22nd on the group's social medias to give a preview of the upcoming single. The members are the main characters of the story and narrate about love at first sight while having a dark secret through romantic monologues. In the music video teaser the secret is revealed when the boys are seen with gold eyes and fangs, showing that they are vampires. The music video was choreographed by Quick Style Crew, who had already collaborated with NCT 127 for "Kick It" and "Punch", Anthony Lee of Kinjaz and long-time collaborator Lee Ilhyung of Prepix.

The music video for "Favorite" seems to be set in a lucid dream with supernatural fantasy elements, in which the members switch between two versions of themselves, one where they're experienced performers and the second where they're blood-thirsty vampires wandering in a mysterious forest.

== Accolades ==
"Favorite (Vampire)" received three first place music program awards on M Countdown (November 4 and 11), and on Show! Music Core (November 6). It was nominated for Song of the Year – October at the 11th Gaon Chart Music Awards.

== Credits and personnel ==
Credits adapted from album's liner notes.

Studio

- Recorded at SM LVYIN Studio and SM Yellow Tail Studio
- Engineered for mix at SM LVYIN Studio
- Digitally edited at Sound Pool Studio
- Mixed at SM Blue Cup Studio
- Mastered at 821 Sound

Personnel

- SM Entertainment – executive producer
- Lee Soo-man – producer
- Lee Sung-soo – production director, executive supervisor
- Tak Young-jun – executive supervisor
- Yoo Young-jin – music and sound supervisor
- NCT 127 – vocals, background vocals
- Oiaisle – background vocals
- Kenzie – lyrics, composition, arrangement, vocal directing
- Rodnae "Chikk" Bell – composition
- Rodney "Darkchild" Jerkins – composition, arrangement
- Lee Ji-hong – recording, engineered for mix
- Noh Min-ji – recording
- Jeong Ho-jin – digital editing
- Jung Eui-seok – mixing
- Kwon Nam-woo – mastering

== Charts ==
=== Weekly charts ===
Weekly chart performance for "Favorite (Vampire)"
Chart (2021)	Peak position
Global 200 (Billboard)	186
Japan Combined Singles (Oricon)	46
Japan (Japan Hot 100)	56
South Korea (Gaon)	2
South Korea (K-pop Hot 100)	43
US World Digital Song Sales (Billboard)	8

=== Monthly charts ===
Monthly chart performance for "Favorite (Vampire)"
Chart (2021)	Position
South Korea (Gaon)	48
South Korea (K-pop Hot 100)	37

== Release history ==
Release history and formats for "Favorite (Vampire)"
Region	Date	Format	Label	Ref.
Various	October 25, 2021	Digital download; streaming	SM Entertainment	

== See also ==
- List of M Countdown Chart winners (2021)
- List of Show Champion Chart winners (2021)
