= Hot Sauce (song) =

2021 single by NCT Dream

- iScreaM project cover

Single by NCT Dream

from the album Hot Sauce
- Language: Korean; English
- Released: May 10, 2021
- Genre: Hip hop; urbano
- Length: 3:15
- Label: SM; Dreamus
- Composers: Martin Wave; Tinashe Sibanda; Philip Kembo; Rosina "Soaky Siren" Russell; John Mitchell; Ninos Hanna; Yoo Young-jin
- Lyricists: Moon Yeo-reum; Jo Yoon-kyung

NCT Dream singles chronology
"Ridin'" (2020)	"Hot Sauce" (2021)	"Hello Future" (2021)

NCT singles chronology
"Kick Back" (2021)	"Hot Sauce" (2021)	"Save" (2021)

Music video
- "Hot Sauce" on YouTube

"Hot Sauce" (Korean: 맛; RR: Mat; lit. 'Flavor') is a song recorded by South Korean boy group NCT Dream for their first studio album of the same name. It was released digitally on May 10, 2021, by SM Entertainment. It became the first trilingual song to enter the Billboard Global 200.

== Composition ==
"Hot Sauce" was composed by Martin Wave, Tinashe Sibanda, Philip Kembo, Rosina "Soaky Siren" Russell, John Mitchell, Ninos Hanna, Yoo Young-jin, while production was handled by Lee Soo-man. Musically, the song is described as "Latin music with Afrobeat-tinged hip-hop song". It features a "minimal track contrast with repetitive chanting and chilling vibes in the chorus". The track was composed in the key of F-sharp major, with a tempo of 100 beats per minute.

== Critical reception ==
Kim Sung-yeop of IZM noted the song as it "expresses only the passionate energy and playful, kitsch charm of NCT Dream", adding that it does not match any of the group's existing styles and has a clear presence as the first song to mark a new beginning. Rhian Daly of NME described the track as "vibrant and exuberant", further adding that "the very SM experimentalism that courses through it elevates it into something more weighty and developed".

"Hot Sauce" was ranked among the best K-pop songs of 2021 by Spotify (5th), Billboard (7th), Young Post (8th), and Dazed (20th). CNN Philippines included it as an honorable mention.

== Commercial performance ==
"Hot Sauce" debuted at number one on South Korea's Gaon Digital Chart with chart issue dated May 9–15, 2021, giving the group their first number-one song on the chart. The song entered the Billboard K-Pop Hot 100 at number 39, and peaked at number 18.

In the United States, "Hot Sauce" debuted at number eight on the Billboard World Digital Song Sales. The single debuted at number 96 on the Billboard Global 200 making it the first song in three languages to enter the chart. The song also debuted at number 51 on the Billboard Global Excl. US.

On the year-end charts, Hot Sauce became NCT Dream and NCT's first entry on the yearly Gaon Digital Chart.

== Music video ==
The music video for "Hot Sauce" is set in a taqueria where the group are tasting their own specialty hot sauce and begins pouring the spicy dressing all over their food. Following the music video's release, Gladys Yeo of NME described it as a "vibrant and whimsical video". Tássia Assis of Teen Vogue noted the "psychedelic TV ad-meets-taquería" of the visual. NCT Dream released two dance practice videos on May 23, 2021.

== Accolades ==
"Hot Sauce" received eight music program awards, including a triple crown on M Countdown. It was nominated for Best Dance Performance – Male Group at the 2021 Mnet Asian Music Awards.

Music program awards
Program	Date	Ref.
Show Champion	May 19, 2021	
M Countdown	May 20, 2021	
M Countdown	May 27, 2021	
M Countdown	June 3, 2021	
Music Bank	May 21, 2021	
Music Bank	May 28, 2021	
Show! Music Core	May 22, 2021	
Inkigayo	May 23, 2021	

== Pinkfong version ==
Global entertainment company SmartStudy released a Pinkfong-style version of "Hot Sauce" on May 28, 2021, at 7:00PM KST (UTC+09:00). According to the chief executive officer of SmartStudy, Kim Min-seok, said that they "have created a special gift for all families and fans out there, regardless of age", further adding that they are "always looking to create opportunities" where they can bring joy to their fans around the world and across generations. The version features a special episode of NCT Dream appearing as Pinkfong dinosaur characters that crash-landed in the Age of Dinosaurs. Korean and English versions of the animation videos were released.

== Credits and personnel ==
Credits adapted from the liner notes of Hot Sauce.

Studio

- SM Booming System – recording, mixing, engineered for mix, digital editing
- SM Yellow Tail Studio – recording, engineered for mix
- SM Blue Cup Studio – mixing
- 821 Sound – mastering

Personnel

- SM Entertainment – executive producer
- Lee Soo-man – producer
- NCT Dream – vocals
  - Haechan – background vocals
  - Renjun – background vocals
- Moon Yeo-reum – lyrics
- Jo Yoon-kyung – lyrics
- Martin Wave – composition, arrangement
- Tinashe Sibanda – composition
- Philip "Dr. Chaii" Kembo – composition, arrangement
- Rosina "Soaky Siren" Russell – composition
- John Mitchell – composition
- Ninos Hanna – composition
- Yoo Young-jin – composition, arrangement, vocal directing, recording, mixing, engineered for mix, digital editing, music and sound supervisor
- Bantu – arrangement
- Kenzie – vocal directing
- Junny – background vocals
- No Min-ji – recording, engineered for mix
- Jung Yu-ra – digital editing
- Jeong Eui-seok – mixing
- Kwon Nam-woo – mastering

== Charts ==
=== Weekly charts ===
Weekly chart performance for "Hot Sauce"
Chart (2021)	Peak position
Global 200 (Billboard)	96
Japan (Japan Hot 100)	44
Singapore (RIAS)	30
South Korea (Gaon)	1
South Korea (K-pop Hot 100)	18
US World Digital Song Sales (Billboard)	8

=== Monthly charts ===
Monthly chart performance for "Hot Sauce"
Chart (2021)	Peak position
South Korea (Gaon)	14

=== Year-end charts ===
Year-end chart performance for "Hot Sauce"
Chart (2021)	Position
South Korea (Gaon)	166

== Release history ==
Release dates and formats for "Hot Sauce"
Region	Date	Format	Label	Ref.
Various	May 10, 2021	Digital download; streaming	SM Entertainment; Dreamus	

== See also ==
- List of Music Bank Chart winners (2021)
