= NCT discography =

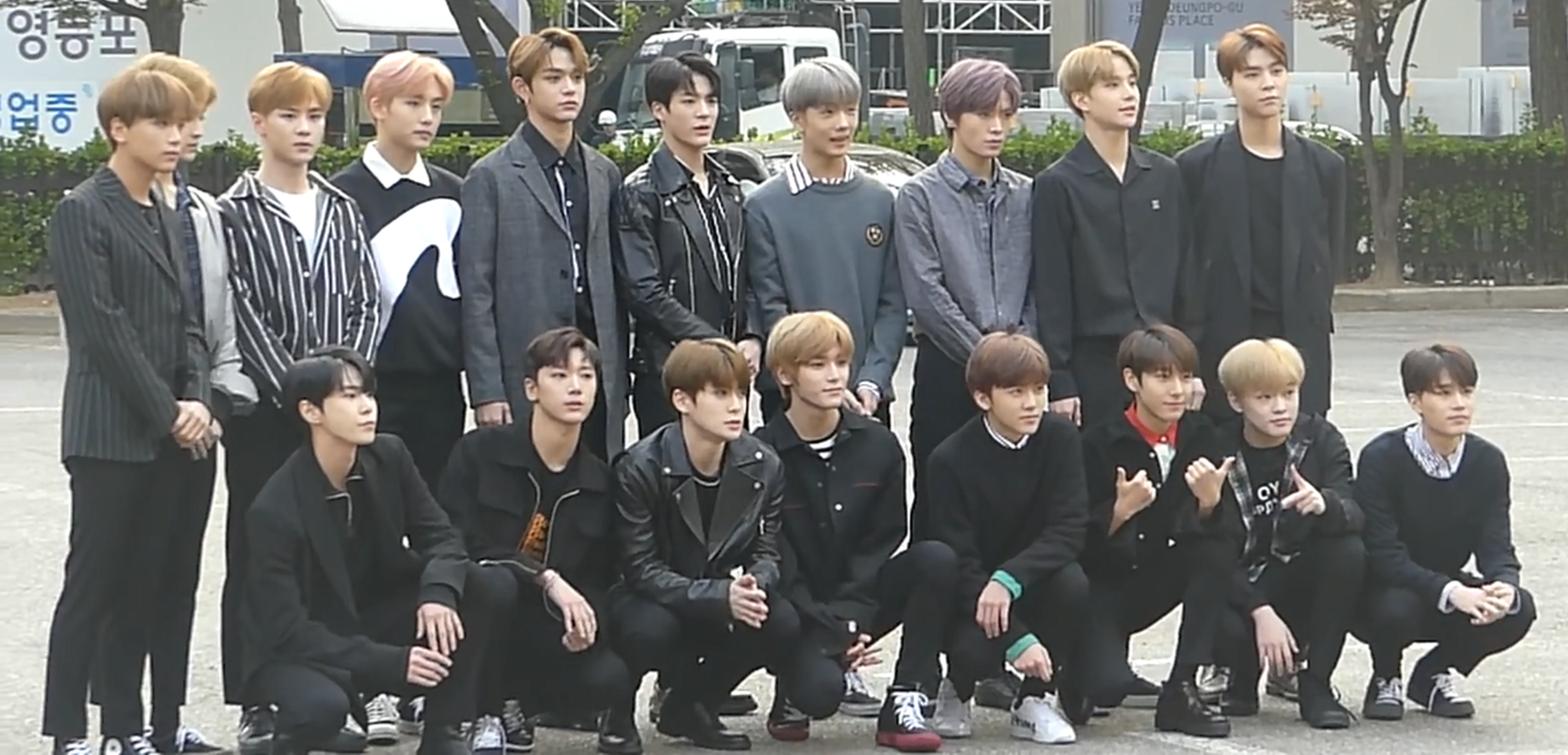
- NCT in 2018
- Studio albums: 4
- Singles: 13

The discography of the South Korean boy group NCT consists of four studio albums and thirteen singles. The multi-national boy group was formed by SM Entertainment in 2016 and comprises multiple sub-units that occasionally reunite to release new music as NCT and NCT U. In 2018, the group released their first studio album, NCT 2018 Empathy, which peaked at number two on South Korea's Circle Album Chart and received a 2× platinum certification, awarded by the Korea Music Content Association (KMCA). Their next album, NCT 2020 Resonance, was released in two parts, which topped the Circle Album Chart, earning NCT their first number-one in the country. Both parts sold over 1.5 million copies and were certified Million by the KMCA. The album became NCT's first entry on national charts in Canada, Hungary, the Flanders and the United States. One of its lead singles, "Make a Wish", reached number 14 on the Circle Digital Chart, becoming NCT's first top 15 hit in South Korea, and peaked at number 126 the Billboard 200, becoming NCT's first song to enter the chart. In 2021, the group released Universe, which became their third number-one album in South Korea and first number-one album in Japan. NCT released their fourth studio album, Golden Age, in 2023.

== Albums ==
=== Studio albums ===
List of studio albums, with selected details, chart positions, sales, and certifications
| Title | Details | Peak positions | | | | | | | | | Sales | Certifications |
| Title | Details | KOR | BEL (FL) | CAN | HUN | JPN | JPN Hot | UK Down. | US | US World | Sales | Certifications |
|---|---|---|---|---|---|---|---|---|---|---|---|---|
| NCT 2018 Empathy | Released: March 14, 2018 (KOR); Label: SM Entertainment; Formats: CD, download, streaming | 2 | — | — | — | 10 | 16 | 68 | — | 5 | KOR: 641,660; JPN: 15,757; US: 1,000 | KMCA: 2× Platinum |
| NCT 2020 Resonance | NCT 2020 Resonance Pt. 1; Released: October 12, 2020 (KOR); Label: SM Entertainment; Formats: CD, download, streaming | 1 | 120 | 95 | 8 | 2 | 11 | 36 | 6 | 1 | KOR: 1,647,895; JPN: 149,855 (Phy.) (Note: The sales of Resonance Pt. 1 and Resonance Pt. 2 are combined in Oricon.); JPN: 2,916 (Dig.); US: 146,000 | KMCA: Million |
| NCT 2020 Resonance | NCT 2020 Resonance Pt. 2; Released: November 23, 2020 (KOR); Label: SM Entertainment; Formats: CD, download, streaming | 1 | 77 | — | 11 | 3 | 35 | — | — | — | KOR: 1,594,515; JPN: 149,855 (Phy.) | KMCA: Million; KMCA: Platinum |
| Universe | Released: December 14, 2021 (KOR); Label: SM Entertainment; Formats: CD, download, streaming | 1 | 95 | — | — | 1 | 1 | — | 20 | 1 | KOR: 1,839,677; JPN: 84,158 (Phy.); US: 20,000 | KMCA: Million |
| Golden Age | Released: August 28, 2023 (KOR); Label: SM Entertainment; Formats: CD, download, streaming | 1 | — | — | — | 1 | 3 | — | 66 | 2 | KOR: 1,048,222; JPN: 79,374 (Phy.); US: 13,000 | KMCA: Million |

== Singles ==
List of singles, with selected chart positions, showing year released, sales, certifications and album name
| Title | Year | Recorded by | Peak chart positions | | | | | Sales (Note: Korean-language singles are downloads while Japanese-language singles are physical units, except noted.) | Album |
| Title | Year | Recorded by | KOR | KOR Billb. (Note: Includes the Billboard K-pop Hot 100 (defunct as of 2022), and South Korea Songs (part of Billboard's Hits of the World (2022 onwards)).) | JPN Hot | US World | WW | Sales | Album |
|---|---|---|---|---|---|---|---|---|---|
| "Black On Black" | 2018 | Taeil, Johnny, Taeyong, Yuta, Kun, Doyoung, Ten, Jaehyun, Winwin, Jungwoo, Lucas, Mark, Renjun, Jeno, Haechan, Jaemin, Chenle, Jisung (Note: Dubbed as "NCT 2018") | — | — | — | — | — | — | NCT 2018 Empathy |
| "Resonance" | 2020 | Taeil, Johnny, Taeyong, Yuta, Kun, Doyoung, Ten, Jaehyun, Winwin, Jungwoo, Lucas, Mark, Xiaojun, Hendery, Renjun, Jeno, Haechan, Jaemin, Yangyang, Chenle, Jisung, Shotaro, Sungchan (Note: Dubbed as "NCT 2020") | — | — | — | 14 | — | — | NCT 2020 Resonance |
| "Beautiful" | 2021 | Taeil, Johnny, Taeyong, Yuta, Kun, Doyoung, Ten, Jaehyun, Jungwoo, Mark, Xiaojun, Hendery, Renjun, Jeno, Haechan, Jaemin, Yangyang, Chenle, Jisung, Shotaro, Sungchan (Note: Dubbed as "NCT 2021") | 195 | — | — | — | — | — | Universe |
| "Golden Age" | 2023 | Taeil, Johnny, Taeyong, Yuta, Kun, Doyoung, Ten, Jaehyun, Winwin, Jungwoo, Mark, Xiaojun, Hendery, Renjun, Jeno, Haechan, Jaemin, Yangyang, Chenle, Jisung (Note: Dubbed as "NCT 2023") | — (Note: "Golden Age" did not enter the Circle Digital Chart, but peaked at number 68 on the Circle Download Chart.) | — | — | — | — | — | Golden Age |
NCT U
| "The 7th Sense" (일곱 번째 감각) | 2016 | Taeyong, Doyoung, Ten, Jaehyun, Mark | 111 | — | — | 2 | — | KOR: 48,376 | NCT 2018 Empathy |
| "Without You" | 2016 | Taeil, Doyoung, Jaehyun (Korean ver.) with Kun (Chinese ver.) | 126 | — | — | 3 | — | KOR: 28,860 | NCT 2018 Empathy |
| "Boss" | 2018 | Taeyong, Doyoung, Jaehyun, Mark, Winwin, Lucas, Jungwoo | 97 | 80 | — | 3 | — | — | NCT 2018 Empathy |
| "Baby Don't Stop" | 2018 | Taeyong, Ten | — (Note: "Baby Don't Stop" did not enter the Gaon Digital Chart, but peaked at number 62 on the Gaon Download Chart.) | — | — | 2 | — | — | NCT 2018 Empathy |
| "Yestoday" | 2018 | Taeyong, Doyoung, Lucas, Mark | — | — | — | — | — | — | NCT 2018 Empathy |
| "Make a Wish" | 2020 | Taeyong, Doyoung, Jaehyun, Lucas, Xiaojun, Jaemin, Shotaro | 14 | 15 | 59 | 11 | 128 | — | NCT 2020 Resonance Pt. 1 |
| "From Home" | 2020 | Taeil, Yuta, Kun, Doyoung, Renjun, Haechan, Chenle | 92 | — | — | — | — | — | NCT 2020 Resonance Pt. 1 |
| "90's Love" | 2020 | Ten, Winwin, Mark, Jeno, Haechan, Yangyang, Sungchan | 84 | 65 | — | 15 | — | — | NCT 2020 Resonance Pt. 2 |
| "Work It" | 2020 | Johnny, Yuta, Ten, Jungwoo, Hendery, Jaemin, Jisung | 123 | — | — | 23 | — | — | NCT 2020 Resonance Pt. 2 |
| "Universe (Let's Play Ball)" | 2021 | Doyoung, Jungwoo, Mark, Xiaojun, Jeno, Haechan, Jaemin, Yangyang, Shotaro | 86 | 96 | 61 | 14 | 147 | — | Universe |
| "Baggy Jeans" | 2023 | Taeyong, Doyoung, Ten, Jaehyun, Mark | 49 | — | — | — | — | — | Golden Age |
"—" denotes releases that did not chart or were not released in that region.

== SM Station singles ==
| Title | Year | Recorded by | Peak chart positions | | Album | SM Station project |
| Title | Year | Recorded by | KOR Down. | US World | Album | SM Station project |
NCT U
| "Timeless" | 2018 | Taeil, Doyoung, Jaehyun | — | — | NCT 2018 Empathy | SM Station Season 2 |
| "Coming Home" | 2019 | Taeil, Doyoung, Jaehyun, Haechan | — | 7 | Non-album singles | SM Station X 4 LOVEs for Winter |
| "Conextion (Age of Light)" | 2022 | Doyoung, Mark, Haechan | — | — | Non-album singles | NCT Lab |
| "Rain Day" | 2022 | Taeil, Kun, Yangyang | 80 | — | Non-album singles | NCT Lab |
| "N.Y.C.T" | 2023 | Taeil, Haechan | 49 | — | Non-album singles | NCT Lab |
| "Marine Turtle" | 2023 | Kun, Xiaojun, Renjun, Chenle | — | — | Non-album singles | NCT Lab |

== Soundtrack appearances ==
| Title | Year | Member(s) | Album |
NCT U
| "Stay in My Life" | 2017 | Taeil, Taeyong, Doyoung | School 2017 OST |
| "Radio Romance" | 2018 | Taeil, Doyoung | Radio Romance OST |
| "New Dream" | 2018 | Taeil, Jaehyun | Dokgo Rewind OST |
| "Best Day Ever" | 2018 | Haechan, Chenle, Jisung | SM Station Season 3, Trolls: The Beat Goes On! Korean OST |
| "New Love" | 2019 | Doyoung, Jaehyun | Best Mistake (일진에게 찍혔을 때) OST |
| "Baby Only You" | 2019 | Doyoung, Mark | The Tale of Nokdu OST |
| "Do It (Let's Play)" | 2024 | Jungwoo, Xiaojun, Jeno, Yangyang, Chenle | NCT Zone OST |

== Collaborations ==
| Title | Year | Recorded by | Peak chart positions | Album |
| Title | Year | Recorded by | KOR Down. | Album |
NCT U
| "Maniac" (prod. Ryan S. Jhun) | 2021 | Doyoung, Haechan | 52 | Maxis by Ryan Jhun Pt. 1 |

== Other charted songs ==
List of other charted songs, with selected chart positions
| Title | Year | Peak chart positions | | Album |
| Title | Year | KOR | KOR Billb. | Album |
NCT U
| "Misfit" | 2020 | 130 | 88 | NCT 2020 Resonance Pt. 1 |
| "Volcano" | 2020 | 168 | — | NCT 2020 Resonance Pt. 1 |
| "Dancing in the Rain" | 2020 | 188 | — | NCT 2020 Resonance Pt. 1 |
| "Faded in My Last Song" | 2020 | 186 | — | NCT 2020 Resonance Pt. 1 |

== See also ==
- NCT 127 discography
- NCT Dream discography
- WayV discography
- NCT Wish discography
