= NCT videography =

NCT discography
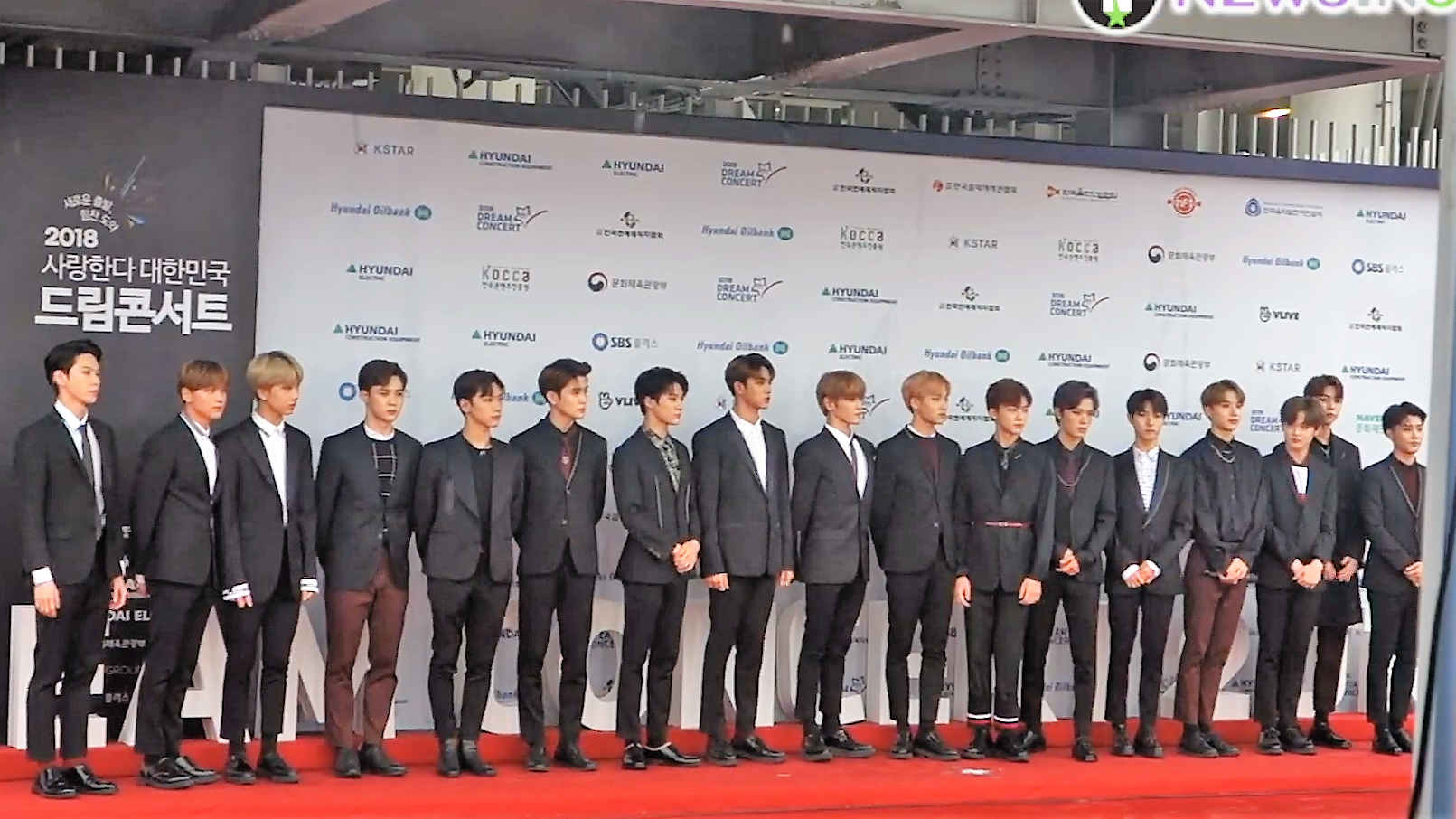
- NCT at the Dream Concert on May 14, 2018
- Video albums: 9
- Music videos: 116
- Television: 5

This is a videography and filmography of the South Korean boy group NCT.

== List of music videos ==
Title	Sub-unit	Year	Director(s)	Ref(s)
"The 7th Sense" (일곱 번째 감각)	NCT U	2016	Jo Beom-jin (VM Project)	
"Without You"	NCT U	2016	Kim Beomchul (Vegetarian Pitbull)	
"Without You" (Chinese Version)	NCT U	2016	Kim Beomchul (Vegetarian Pitbull)	
"Fire Truck" (소방차)	NCT 127	2016	Kim Ho-bin	
"Taste The Feeling"	NCT 127	2016	Jo Beom-jin (VM Project)	
"Chewing Gum"	NCT Dream	2016	Kim Ja-kyung (Flexible Pictures)	
"Chewing Gum" (泡泡糖)	NCT Dream	2016	Kim Ja-kyung (Flexible Pictures)	
"Chewing Gum" (Hoverboard Performance Video)	NCT Dream	2016	Kim Beom-chul (Vegetarian Pitbull)	
"Good Thing!"	NCT 127	2016	Kim Yong-soo (HIGHQUALITYFISH)	
"Switch"	NCT 127	2016	—N/a	
"無限的我 (무한적아; Limitless) Performance Ver."	NCT 127	2017	Kim Ja-kyoung	
"無限的我 (무한적아; Limitless) Rough Ver."	NCT 127	2017	Seong Chang-won	
"My First and Last" (마지막 첫사랑)	NCT Dream	2017	Shin Hee-won	
"My First and Last" (最後的初戀)	NCT Dream	2017	Shin Hee-won	
"Cherry Bomb"	NCT 127	2017	Oui Kim	
"We Young"	NCT Dream	2017	VIDEOKID	
"We Young" (青春漾)	NCT Dream	2017	VIDEOKID	
"Limitless"	NCT 127	2017	Kim Woo-je (ETUI Collective)	
"Joy"	NCT Dream	2017	—N/a	
"Timeless" (텐데..)	NCT U	2018	Sunghwi (nvrmnd)	
"Boss"	NCT U	2018	Oui Kim	
"Baby Don't Stop"	NCT U	2018	Oui Kim	
"Go"	NCT Dream	2018	JINOOYA MAKES	
"Touch"	NCT 127	2018	Oui Kim	
"Yestoday"	NCT U	2018	DANIEL JON	
"Black on Black"	NCT 2018	2018	Kim Woo-je (ETUI Collective)	
"Chain"	NCT 127	2018	Roh Sang-yoon (flimbyteam)	
"We Go Up"	NCT Dream	2018	Lee Jun-woo (Salt Film)	
"We Go Up" (青春接力)	NCT Dream	2018	Lee Jun-woo (Salt Film)	
"Regular" (English Version)	NCT 127	2018	Kim Woo-je (ETUI Collective)	
"Regular"	NCT 127	2018	Kim Woo-je (ETUI Collective)	
"Simon Says"	NCT 127	2018	Paranoid Paradigm	
"Fly Away with Me" (신기루)	NCT 127	2018	NCT 127	
"Candle Light"	NCT Dream	2018	Lee ln-hoon	
"Regular" (理所当然)	WayV	2019	RIGEND FILM STUDIO	
"Dream Launch" (梦想发射计划)	WayV	2019	Bang Jae-yeob	
"Wakey-Wakey"	NCT 127	2019	Wani	
"Take Off" (无翼而飞)	WayV	2019	Oui Kim	
"Let Me Love U" (爱不释手)	WayV	2019	WayV	
"Superhuman"	NCT 127	2019	RIGEND FILM STUDIO	
"Don't Need Your Love"	NCT Dream	2019	filmbyteam	
"Highway to Heaven"	NCT 127	2019	JINOOYA MAKES	
"Boom"	NCT Dream	2019	Lee Jun-woo (Salt Film)	
"Moonwalk" (天选之城)	WayV	2019	Shin Hee-won	
"Love Talk"	WayV	2019	Shin Hee-won	
"Coming Home"	NCT U	2019	Yoo Sung-kyun (SUNNYVISUAL)	
"Kick It" (英雄;영웅)	NCT 127	2020	Oui Kim	
"Ridin'"	NCT Dream	2020	Kwon Yong-soo (Saccharin Film)	
"Punch"	NCT 127	2020	GDW	
"Turn Back Time" (超越时空)	WayV	2020	Paranoid Paradigm	
"Turn Back Time" (Korean Version)	WayV	2020	Paranoid Paradigm	
"Bad Alive" (English Version)	WayV	2020	YUA (FLIPEVIL)	
"Make a Wish (Birthday Song)"	NCT U	2020	JINOOYA MAKES	
"From Home"	NCT U	2020	YUA (FLIPEVIL)	
"90's Love"	NCT U	2020	Oui Kim	
"Work It"	NCT U	2020	Park Soo-bin	
"Resonance"	NCT 2020	2020	Oui Kim	
"Gimme Gimme"	NCT 127	2021	Bang Jae-yeob	
"Kick Back" (秘境)	WayV	2021	SUSHIVISUAL	
"Hot Sauce" (맛)	NCT Dream	2021	SUSHIVISUAL	
"Save"	NCT 127	2021	Kim Woo-je (ETUI Collective)	
"Back To You"	WayV	2021	—N/a	
"Back To You" (English Version)	WayV	2021	—N/a	
"Hello Future"	NCT Dream	2021	725 (SL8)	
"Low Low"	WayV	2021	Chung Ki-youl (Digipedi)	
"Jalapeño"	WayV	2021	Kim In-tae (AFF)	
"Sticker"	NCT 127	2021	Oui Kim	
"Favorite (Vampire)"	NCT 127	2021	Yeom Woo-jin	
"Universe (Let's Play Ball)"	NCT U	2021	Joe Beom-jin (VM Project)	
"Beautiful"	NCT 2021	2021		
"Glitch Mode"	NCT Dream	2022	Oui Kim	
"Beatbox"	NCT Dream	2022	Kim In-tae (AFF)	
"Rain Day"	NCT U	2022	Yeom Woo-jin	
"2 Baddies"	NCT 127	2022	JINOOYA MAKES	
"Candy"	NCT Dream	2022	725 (SL8)	
"Phantom"	WayV	2022	FLIPEVIL	
"Ay-Yo"	NCT 127	2023	Lee In-hoon	
"Best Friend Ever"	NCT Dream	2023	HIGHQUALITYFISH	
"Perfume"	NCT DoJaeJung	2023	Lee Hye-in (2eehyein)	
"Broken Melodies"	NCT Dream	2023	Oui Kim	
"ISTJ"	NCT Dream	2023	Lee Hye-in (2eehyein)	
"Golden Age"	NCT U	2023	Kim Min-jae	
"Baggy Jeans"	NCT U	2023	Paranoid Paradigm (VM Project)	
"N.Y.C.T"	NCT U	2023	Yunah Sheep	
"Fact Check" (불가사의; 不可思議)	NCT 127	2023	Jason Kim (FLIPEVIL)	
"Hands Up"	NCT Wish	2023	Cho Joon-koo (AIMUS)	
"On My Youth"	WayV	2023	Kim Hyun-soo (Segaji Video)	
"Marine Turtle" (蓝洋海龟)	NCT U	2023	—N/a	
"Be There For Me"	NCT 127	2023	Vin Kim (KEPLER LAB)	
"Wish" (Japanese ver.)	NCT Wish	2024	Shin Hee-won (ST-WT)	
"Wish" (Korean ver.)	NCT Wish	2024	Shin Hee-won (ST-WT)	
"Smoothie"	NCT Dream	2024	Song Tae-Jong	
"Give Me That" (Korean Ver.)	WayV	2024	Lee Su-ho	
"Moonlight"	NCT Dream	2024	Kang Mingyu (GEW) (SL8 Visual Lab)	
"Songbird" (Japanese Ver.)	NCT Wish	2024	Oh Ji-won (UNDERMOOD FILM)	
"Walk(삐그덕)"	NCT 127	2024	HATTRICK	
"Rains in Heaven"	NCT Dream	2024	Cho Joon-ko (AIMUS)	
"Dunk Shot"	NCT Wish	2024	Lee Jae-don, Kim Kyung-ho	
"3 Minutes (3분까진 필요 없어)"	NCT Wish	2024	Yoo Sung-kyun (SUNNYVISUAL)	
"Steady"	NCT Wish	2024	Lee Youngeum (OGG Visual)	
"Go Higher"	WayV	2024	Kim Ja-kyeong (Flexible Pictures)	
"Flying Kiss"	NCT Dream	2024	Hye-jin Keem	
"When I'm with You"	NCT Dream	2024	Cho Joon-ko (AIMUS)	
"High Five"	WayV	2024	Wasabimayo (Sauce Factory)	
"Frequency (Korean Ver.)"	WayV	2024	Kim Yong (YVNG WING)	
"Wishful Winter"	NCT Wish	2024	Lee Young-eum (OGG Visual)	
"Poppop"	NCT Wish	2025	Oh Ji-won (UNDERMOODFILM)	
"BTTF"	NCT Dream	2025	Vin Kim (Kepler Lab)	
"Chiller"	NCT Dream	2025	Yuji Shin (OBVIOUS)	
"Big Bands" (狂想曲)	WayV	2025	Hong Jae-hwan and Lee Hye-su (SWISHER)	
"Surf"	NCT Wish	2025	Lee Youn-geum (OGG Visual)	
"Baby Blue"	NCT Wish	2025	Shin Hee-won (storieswetell)	
"Color"	NCT Wish	2025	YVNG WING (IDIOTS)	
"Beat It Up"	NCT Dream	2025	Lafic (LIMINAL & TMTBS)	
"Eternal White" (白色定格)	WayV	2025	Giseong Jun (ES4X)	
"Hello Mellow"	NCT Wish	2026	Denki Imahara (TYO MONSTER)	

=== Other videos ===
Title	Year	Director(s)	Ref.
"SM_NCT # 1. The origin"	2016	Jun Shim	
"SM_NCT # 2. Synchronization of your dreams"	2016	Dawittgold (Saint East)	
"SM_NCT # 3. 7th Sense"	2016	Dawittgold (Saint East)	
"NCT 2018 Yearbook #1"	2018	Roh Sang-yoon (filmbyteam)	
"NCT 2018 Yearbook #2"	2018	Roh Sang-yoon (filmbyteam)	
"NCTmentary EP1. Dream Lab"	2018	Kim Woo-je (ETUI Collective)	
"NCTmentary EP2. Switch"	2018	Kim Woo-je (ETUI Collective)	
"NCTmentary EP3. Empathy"	2018	Kim Woo-je (ETUI Collective)	
"NCTmentary EP4. Synchronization of Dreams"	2018	Kim Woo-je (ETUI Collective)	
"NCTmentary EP5. Back to the Reality"	2018	Kim Woo-je (ETUI Collective)	
"NCT 127 'Regular Dream'"	2018	Roh Sang-yoon (filmbyteam)	
"NCT 127 'Irregular Office"	2018	Roh Sang-yoon (filmbyteam)	
"WayV 'SEE THE V'"	2019	Roh Sang-yoon (filmbyteam)	
"WayV 'FEEL THE V'"	2019	Roh Sang-yoon (filmbyteam)	
"WayV 'Dream Launch Plan Series'"	2019	Roh Sang-yoon (filmbyteam)	
"WayV 'READY FOR TAKE OFF'"	2019	Roh Sang-yoon (filmbyteam)	
"WayV 'Take Off: Character Analysis'"	2019	Roh Sang-yoon (filmbyteam)	
"TO THE WORLD : NCT 127 1st World Tour 'NEO CITY'"	2019	CINENUTS	
"NCT 127 "Highway to Heaven" NEO CITY Tour Film Version"	2019	Cho Sung-bin	
NCT DREAM TOUR : "THE DREAM SHOW"	2019	CINENUTS	
"NCT 127 'Dreams Come True'"	2020	Kim In-tae (AFF)	
"NCT 127 'Elevator (127F)' Track Video #1"	2020	Kang Min-gi (aarch)	
"NCT 127 '꿈 (Boom)' Track Video #3"	2020	Kang Min-gi (aarch)	
"NCT 127 '낮잠 (Pandora's Box)' Track Video #4"	2020	—N/a	
"NCT 127 'Day Dream (白日夢)' Track Video #5"	2020	Kim In-tae (AFF)	
"NCT 127 '뿔 (MAD DOG)' Track Video #7"	2020	Kim In-tae (AFF)	
"NCT 127 'Sit Down!' Track Video #8"	2020	Kim In-tae (AFF)	
"NCT 127 '메아리 (Love Me Now)' Track Video #9"	2020	—N/a	
"NCT 127 '우산 (Love Song)' Track Video #10"	2020	Kang Min-gi (aarch)	
"NCT 127 '백야 (White Night)' Track Video #11"	2020	Kang Min-gi (aarch)	
"NCT 127 "Not Alone" Track Video #12"	2020	—N/a	
"NCT DREAM '너의 자리 (Puzzle Piece)' Track Video #1	2020	Kang Min-gi (aarch)	
"NCT DREAM '내게 말해줘 (7 Days)' Track Video #2"	2020	Kang Min-gi (aarch)	
"NCT DREAM '사랑은 또다시 (Love Again)' Track Video #3"	2020	—N/a	
"NCT DREAM "Quiet Down" Track Video #4"	2020	—N/a	
"NCT 127 '너의 하루 (Make Your Day)' Episode #1"	2020	eehosoo	
"NCT 127 "NonStop" Episode #2"	2020	eehosoo	
"NCT 2020 'INTERLUDE : RESONANCE"	2020	Jan' Qui (Keep Us Weird)	
NCT 2020 "YearParty"	2020	Kim Woo-je (ETUI Collective)	
"NCT DREAM '무대로 (Déjà Vu;舞代路)' Track Video"	2020	Kim In-tae (AFF)	
"NCT U "Misfit" Track Video"	2020	Ha Jung-hoon (SUSHIVISUAL)	
"NCT 2020: The Past & Future - Ether"	2020	Woonghui	
"NCT U 'From Home (Rearranged Version)"	2020	—N/a	
"NCT DREAM '고래 (Dive Into You)' DREAM-VERSE Chapter #1 The Love Triangle"	2021	JINOOYA MAKES	
"NCT DREAM 'Rainbow (책갈피)' DREAM-VERSE Chapter #2 The Thing I Cherish"	2021	JINOOYA MAKES	
"NCT DREAM "Diggity" DREAM-VERSE Chapter #3 The Taste of Pain"	2021	JINOOYA MAKES	
"NCT DREAM '오르골 (Life Is Still Going On)' DREAM-VERSE Bonus Chapter「Dreaming of The Future」"	2021	Kang Min-gi (aarch)	
"NCT 127 : Who is STICKER"	2021	WASABIMAYO	
"NCT 127 "Dreamer" Track Video #1"	2021	Lee Min-jun and Lee Ha-young (MOSWANTD)	
"NCT 127 "Magic Carpet Ride" Track Video #2"	2021	Lee Min-jun and Lee Ha-young (MOSWANTD)	
"NCT 127 "Road Trip" Track Video #3"	2021	Kwon Yong-soo (Saccharin Film)	
"NCT 127 "Lemonade" Track Video #4"	2021	Ha Joo-young	
"NCT 127 'Story of Favorite"	2021	Bae Sun-woo and Han Hye-su	
"NCT 2021 YearDream : Stage 0 - The 7th Sense (The First Encounter of A Dream)"	2021	Kwon Yong-soo (Saccharin Film)	
"NCT 2021 YearDream : Stage 3 - Synchronization of Dreams"	2021	JINOOYA MAKES	
"NCT 2021 YearDream : Stage 1 - Seeing Myself in a Dream"	2021	Kwon Yong-soo (Saccharin Film)	
"NCT 2021 YearDream : Stage 2 - Surfing in Our Dreams"	2021	Kwon Yong-soo (Saccharin Film)	
"NCT 2021 YearDream : Stage 4 - Resonance"	2021	JINOOYA MAKES	
"NCT DREAM 'Dreaming' Track Video"	2021	Lee Min-jun and Lee Ha-young (MOSWANTD)	
"WayV 'Miracle' Track Video"	2021	Kim Hyun-soo (SEGAJI VIDEO)	
"NCT 127 'Earthquake' Track Video"	2021	Kim In-tae (AFF)	
"NCT U 'coNEXTion (Age of Light)' Performance Video"	2022	SWISHER	
"WayV 'Diamonds Only' Track Video"	2022	Lee Yong-seok (What's Worth Studio)	
"WayV 'Good Life' Track Video"	2023	Lee Yong-seok (What's Worth Studio)	
"NCT 127 'DJ' Track Video"	2023	—N/a	
"7 DREAM Production : lucky7 vending machine"	2023	Vin Kim (KEPLER LAB)	
"7 DREAM Production : Stranger Seven"	2023	Vin Kim (KEPLER LAB)	
"NCT DREAM 'Poison' Track Video"	2023	—N/a	
"NCT U 'Kangaroo' Archiving Video"	2023	—N/a	
"NCT U 'Alley Oop' Archiving Video"	2023	—N/a	
"NCT U 'The Bat' Archiving Video"	2023	—N/a	
"NCT U 'PADO' Archiving Video"	2023	—N/a	
"NCT 127 : Deities of Seoul"	2023	Lee Yong-seok (What's Worth Studio)	
"NCT 127 'Angel Eyes' Track Video"	2023	—N/a	
"WayV 'Poppin' Love (心动预告)' Track Video"	2023	Lee In-hoon (SEGAJI VIDEO)	
"WayV 'No One But You + INVINCIBLE (极限)' Track Video"	2023	Lee In-hoon (SEGAJI VIDEO)	
"NCT : Dream Contact 'Our WISH"	2024	—N/a	
"NCT WISH : WISH for Our WISH"	2024	—N/a	
"NCT WISH : Welcome to Cupid Scouting Society!"	2024	HEADHEAD	
"NCT Dream ( )SCAPE Film"	2024	—N/a	
"WayV 'New Ride (浪漫公路)' Track Video"	2024	—N/a	
"NCT 127 : WALKING CLUB 127"	2024	—N/a	
"NCT WISH : Missing Bird in Cupid Museum"	2024	Vin Kim (KEPLER LAB)	
"NCT 127 'Intro: Wall to Wall' Track Video"	2024	Lee Yong-seok (What's Worth Studio)	
"NCT 127 '사랑한다는 말의 뜻을 알아가자 (Meaning of Love)' Track Video"	2024	—N/a	
"NCT DREAM : Construct a new DREAMSCAPE"	2024	Lyu Hyu-nuk, Jo Young-min	
"NCT WISH 'Tears Are Falling (Korean Ver.)' Summer Movie"	2024	—N/a	
"WayV 'Call Me' Special Video"	2024	—N/a	
"NCT WISH 'Miracle' Special Video"	2025	—N/a	
"NCT WISH : Melted WICHU Inside My Pocket"	2025	—N/a	

== Video albums ==
=== Live video albums ===
Title	Album details	Peaks		Sales
Title	Album details	JPN		Sales
Title	Album details	DVD	Blu-ray	Sales
NCT 127 1st Tour 'NEO CITY : JAPAN - The Origin'	Released: June 26, 2019; Label: Avex Trax; Formats: DVD, Blu-ray (both with Photobook)	2	8	JPN (DVD):5,445

=== Other video albums ===
Title	Album details	Details of content
NCT 2019 Season's Greetings	Released: November 30, 2018; Label: SM Entertainment	1. Package; 2. Desk calendar 3. Diary; 4. A4 poster set 5. Sticker set (photo & handwriting); 6. Accordion calendar 7. DVD & paper bag 8. Board game set (game markers, stands, game board & dices)
NCT 127 'Hello! #Seoul'	Released: July 17, 2019; Label: SM Entertainment	1. Photo book (272 pages); 2. Making DVD; 3. Photo card
NCT 127 2019 Summer Vacation Kit	Released: June 14, 2019; Label: SM Entertainment	1. Package; 2. Summer note (80 pages); 3. Vacation note (80 pages); 4. Sticker & pouch set 5. Summer bottle 6. Mini clear fan 7. A4 poster 8. DVD; 9. Frame & postcard set
NCT Dream 2019 Summer Vacation Kit	Released: June 14, 2019; Label: SM Entertainment	1. Package; 2. Summer note (80 pages); 3. Vacation note (80 pages); 4. Sticker & pouch set 5. Summer bottle 6. Mini clear fan 7. A4 poster 8. DVD; 9. Polaroid & paper bag set
WayV 2019 Summer Vacation Kit	Released: June 14, 2019; Label: Label V	1. Package; 2. Summer note (80 pages); 3. Vacation note (80 pages); 4. Sticker & pouch set 5. Summer bottle 6. Mini clear fan 7. A4 poster 8. DVD; 9. Frame & film set
NCT 127 2020 Season's Greetings	Released: December 13, 2019; Label: SM Entertainment	1. Package; 2. Desk calendar 3. Hard cover diary (120 pages); 4. A4 poster set 5. Sticker set 6. Postcard calendar & stand set 7. DVD & paper bag 8. Mini brochure 9. NCT 127's element card & postcard set
NCT Dream 2020 Season's Greetings	Released: December 13, 2019; Label: SM Entertainment	1. Package; 2. Desk calendar 3. Hard cover diary (120 pages); 4. A4 poster set 5. Sticker set 6. Postcard calendar & stand set 7. DVD & paper bag 8. Mini brochure 9. Additional item
WayV 2020 Season's Greetings	Released: December 13, 2019; Label: Label V	1. Package; 2. Desk calendar 3. Hard cover diary (120 pages); 4. A4 poster set 5. Sticker set 6. Postcard calendar & stand set 7. DVD & paper bag 8. Mini brochure 9. Additional item

== Filmography ==
=== Film ===
Year	Title	Role	Notes	Ref.
NCT Dream
2022	NCT Dream The Movie: In a Dream	Themselves	Documentary concert film	
2024	NCT Dream Mystery Lab: DREAM()SCAPE	Themselves	Documentary concert film	

=== Television ===
Year	Title	Role	Notes	Ref.
NCT
2016–2021	NCT Life	Cast members	Variety show, 11 seasons	
2020	NCT World 2.0	Cast members	Variety show, aired on Mnet	
2022	Welcome to NCT Universe	Cast members	Variety show	
NCT 127
2019	Teach Me Japan	Cast members	Variety show, 2 seasons, aired on dTV	
2021	Saturday Night Live Korea	Hosts	Season 10 episode 6	
2021	Analog Trip NCT 127: Escape From Magic Island	Cast members	Travel documentary, aired on YouTube Premium	
2023	NCT 127: The Lost Boys	Cast members	Documentary	
NCT Dream
2023	Star Struck	Cast Members	Variety show broadcast on NCT Dream's YouTube channel and Weverse.	
2025	3 Hours Trip	Cast Members	Featuring 5 members of NCT Dream, airing on Music On! TV	
