= Regular-Irregular =

2018 studio album by NCT 127

- Digital cover

Studio album by NCT 127
- Released: October 12, 2018
- Recorded: 2018
- Studios: SM, Seoul, South Korea
- Genres: hip hop; R&B; K-pop
- Length: 40:01
- Languages: Korean; English
- Labels: SM; iRIVER
- Producers: Lee Soo-man (exec.); Yoo Young-jin; LDN Noise; Hitchhiker; Andreas Öberg; Simon Petrén; The Stereotypes; Mike Daley; Mitchell Owens; Vedo; George Kranz; Esna; Deez; Michael Jiminez; Tay Jasper; Double Dragon; Francesco Yates; Rory Andrew; Jenna Andrews; Dylan Pace-Rodriguez

NCT 127 chronology
Chain (2018)	Regular-Irregular (2018)	Awaken (2019)

NCT chronology
We Go Up (2018)	Regular-Irregular (2018)	The Vision (2018)

Singles from Regular-Irregular
- 1. "Regular" Released: October 12, 2018

Repackaged edition cover

Singles from Regulate
- 1. "Simon Says" Released: November 23, 2018

Regular-Irregular is the first studio album by South Korean boy band NCT 127, the second sub-unit of the South Korean boy band NCT. Described as a multi-genre concept album with a total of eleven tracks, the album was released by SM Entertainment on October 12, 2018, and distributed by IRIVER. This marks NCT 127's first Korean major release after a year and four months since their previous EP, Cherry Bomb, released in June 2017. It is also their first release as a ten-member group after Jungwoo was added in September 2018. It is also the group's last release featuring member Winwin, as he would focus his promotions on WayV following the album's release.

Upon the album release, Regular-Irregular attained commercial success in both South Korea and other countries. The album debuted atop the Gaon Album Chart and became one of the few releases to stay No. 1, longer than a single week in 2018. Additionally, it debuted at No. 86 on the US Billboard 200 in the week of October 27, 2018, thus becoming NCT 127's first entry on the chart. It is also the group's highest charting release on the UK and France's download albums charts and became their first entry on the Australian Digital Albums chart.

The album's repackage, Regulate, was released on November 23, 2018, along with its lead single, "Simon Says".

== Background and release ==
=== Regular-Irregular ===
On September 17, a teaser video was released on the group's Twitter account, showcasing flashes of the words "regular", "irregular", and the new NCT 127 logo. Later that day, SM Entertainment announced the addition of Jungwoo to the group and that NCT 127 would release its first full-length album Regular-Irregular on October 12. Following the announcement, NCT 127 entered the Billboard's Social 50 at number five for the week of September 29. Photo and video teasers were released from September 18 up to October 11.

On October 8, NCT 127 released the music video of their new single "Regular" in English version, which marks the group's first English-language song. The music video for the Korean version of "Regular" was released on October 11, 2018. The album was released on October 12, 2018.

=== Regulate ===
On November 13, 2018, NCT 127 announced the release of the album's repackage, Regulate with teasers of the members. The album and its lead single, "Simon Says", was released on November 23, 2018.

== Composition ==
The album's theme revolves around the exploration of reality and dreams. The album incorporates several genres; such as pop, dance, R&B, ballad and hip-hop.

"Regular" is described as a high-energy hip hop track with sensual Latin vibes that incorporates Spanish lyrics. Billboard noted that unlike many Korean songs re-released by K-pop bands in other languages, the English version of "Regular" differentiates itself from the Korean version through the content of their lyrics. The Korean one addresses their current state as a group trying to make its way in the world, in contrast to the hopeful, goal-oriented swagger expressed in the English alternative. While both versions focus on money, the Korean addresses the reality of their world versus the luxurious lifestyle expressed in the English.

The sixth track, "Interlude: Regular to Irregular" contains the music used in the video "NCT 2018 Yearbook #1" as well as a rearranged version of a future bass composition (titled "The 7th Sense – Reverse") by Korean electronica musician Hitchhiker that was performed by the sub-unit in the 2017 Mnet Asian Music Awards. The track also contains narrations done in Korean (by new member Jungwoo), Japanese (by Yuta) and Mandarin (by Winwin), as well as a verse from the American author Edgar Allan Poe's 1849 poem, "A Dream Within a Dream" narrated by member Johnny. The eighth track, "Come Back", is a Korean version of the originally released Japanese track off their debut Japanese EP Chain. The bonus track, "Run Back 2 U", is the full version of the demo song originally titled "Bassbot" previously performed by NCT members Johnny, Taeyong, Yuta, Ten and Jaehyun and then-SM trainee Hansol in a pre-debut video under the company's pre-debut group SM Rookies in 2015.

== Promotion ==
=== Regular-Irregular ===
NCT 127 kick-started promotions for the album in the U.S. with television promotions and a partnership with Apple Music. They performed their new single "Regular" as well as "Cherry Bomb" on the Jimmy Kimmel Live! outdoor concert series stage on October 8, marking their U.S. television debut; the group also appeared at the 2018 American Music Awards. They performed at ABC's Mickey's 90th Spectacular TV special on November 4.

NCT 127 was also announced as Apple Music's 'Up Next' Artist; the group was featured on Apple-based platforms, including a short film exploring the band and their music, an Apple Music–only choreography video, and a Beats 1 interview.

=== Regulate ===
On November 22, it was announced that member Winwin would not participate in promotions for Regulate as he was preparing for the group's Chinese activities. NCT 127 performed "Simon Says" on Music Bank, Inkigayo, and Show! Music Core, as well as the Korean version of "Chain" on The Show and Show Champion.

== Reception ==
=== Regular-Irregular ===
In a positive review, Billboard praised the album for showcasing both the group's artistry and skill through its diversity of sounds and experimental approach towards an album concept, helping to solidify their style. The magazine ranked it as the 15th best K-pop album of 2018. MTV also named "Come Back" among the best K-pop B-sides of the year.

=== Regulate ===
On December 10, it was announced that "Simon Says" had become the group's first song to chart at number one on the US Digital Song Sales chart.

== Track listing ==
Credits adapted from Naver

Regular-Irregular
No.	Title	Lyrics	Music	Arrangement	Length
1.	"City 127" (Korean: 지금 우리; RR: Jigeum uri; lit. 'Now We')	JQ (Makeumine Works); Moon Hee-yeon (Makeumine Works); Taeyong; Mark	The Stereotypes; Micah Powell; Clarence Coffee Jr.; Taeyong	The Stereotypes	3:19
2.	"Regular"	Coogie (ATM Seoul); Tommy $trate; Taeyong; Mark	Mike Daley; Mitchell Owens; Wilbart "Vedo" McCoy III; George Kranz; Yoo Young-jin	Mike Daley; Mitchell Owens	3:37
3.	"Replay (PM 01:27)" (sung by Taeil, Johnny, Yuta, Doyoung, Jaehyun, Winwin, Jungwoo, and Haechan)	Bang Hye-hyun	LDN Noise; Varren Wade	LDN Noise	3:39
4.	"Knock On"	Zaya (Joombas); Kim Min-ji	Gene Noble; MZMC	MZMC	3:25
5.	"No Longer" (나의 모든 순간; Naui modeun sungan; 'All My Moments') (sung by Taeil, Doyoung, Jaehyun, Jungwoo, and Haechan)	Hyun Hwang (MonoTree)	Andreas Öberg; Simon Petrén; Gustav Karlström; Onestar (MonoTree); eSNa	Simon Petrén	4:57
6.	"Interlude: Regular to Irregular" (Narrated by Johnny, Yuta, Winwin, and Jungwoo)		Kim Kyung-min; Hitchhiker	Hitchhiker; Yi Nile	3:10
7.	"My Van" (내 Van; Nae Van) (sung by Taeyong, Yuta, Jaehyun, Jungwoo, and Mark)	Kim Dong-hyun; Taeyong; Mark	Kim Dong-hyun; 250	250	3:26
8.	"Come Back" (악몽; Angmong; 'Nightmare')	Bong Eun-young; Ryu Da-som; Taeyong; Mark	Mike Daley; Mitchell Owens; Deez; Michael Jiminez; Jeremy "Tay" Jasper; MZMC	Mike Daley; Mitchell Owens	3:25
9.	"Fly Away with Me" (신기루; Singiru; 'Mirage')	Kang Eun-jung; Hwang Yoo-bin	Rory Wynne Andrew; Francesco Yates; Jenna Andrews; Dillon Pace	Dillon Pace	3:32
10.	"Regular" (English version)	Wilbart "Vedo" McCoy III; Taeyong; Mark	Mike Daley; Mitchell Owens; Wilbart "Vedo" McCoy III; George Kranz; Yoo Young-jin	Mike Daley; Mitchell Owens	3:39
11.	"Run Back 2 U" (Bonus track)	Kim Min-seok; Double Dragon	Donald "haZEL" Sales; Double Dragon	Double Dragon	3:39
Total length:					40:02

Regulate repackage
No.	Title	Lyrics	Music	Arrangement	Length
1.	"City 127" (지금 우리; Jigeum uri; 'Now We')	JQ (Makeumine Works); Moon Hee-yeon (Makeumine Works); Taeyong; Mark	The Stereotypes; Micah Powell; Clarence Coffee Jr.; Taeyong	The Stereotypes	3:19
2.	"Regular"	Coogie (ATM Seoul); Tommy $trate; Taeyong; Mark	Mike Daley; Mitchell Owens; Wilbart "Vedo" McCoy III; George Kranz; Yoo Young-jin	Mike Daley; Mitchell Owens	3:37
3.	"Replay (PM 01:27)" (sung by Taeil, Johnny, Yuta, Doyoung, Jaehyun, Winwin, Jungwoo, and Haechan)	Bang Hye-hyun	LDN Noise; Varren Wade	LDN Noise	3:39
4.	"Welcome to My Playground"	Seo Ji-eum; Ra.D; BrotherSu; Taeyong; Mark	Johan Gustafsson (Trinity Music); Ra.D; BrotherSu	Johan Gustafsson (Trinity Music)	3:59
5.	"Knock On"	Zaya (Joombas); Kim Min-ji	Gene Noble; MZMC	MZMC	3:25
6.	"No Longer" (나의 모든 순간; Naui modeun sungan; 'All My Moments') (sung by Taeil, Doyoung, Jaehyun, Jungwoo, and Haechan)	Hyun Hwang (MonoTree)	Andreas Öberg; Simon Petrén; Gustav Karlström; Onestar (MonoTree); eSNa	Simon Petrén	4:57
7.	"My Van" (내 Van; Nae Van) (sung by Taeyong, Yuta, Jaehyun, Jungwoo, and Mark)	Kim Dong-hyun; Taeyong; Mark	Kim Dong-hyun; 250	250	3:26
8.	"Interlude: Regular to Irregular" (Narrated by Johnny, Yuta, Winwin, and Jungwoo)		Kim Kyung-min; Hitchhiker	Hitchhiker; Yi Nile	3:10
9.	"Simon Says"	JQ (Makeumine Works); DADA (Makeumine Works); Tommy $trate	Anne Judith Wik; Ronny Svendsen; Jin Suk Choi; Bobii Lewis; Yoo Young-jin	Dsign Music; Yoo Young-jin	3:19
10.	"Come Back" (악몽; Angmong; 'Nightmare')	Bong Eun-young; Ryu Da-som; Taeyong; Mark	Mike Daley; Mitchell Owens; Deez; Michael Jiminez; Jeremy "Tay" Jasper; MZMC	Mike Daley; Mitchell Owens	3:25
11.	"Fly Away with Me" (신기루; Singiru; 'Mirage')	Kang Eun-jung; Hwang Yoo-bin	Rory Wynne Andrew; Francesco Yates; Jenna Andrews; Dillon Pace	Dillon Pace	3:32
12.	"Chain" (Korean version)	JQ (Makeumine Works); On Gyeol; Sohlhee	250; Albin Nordqvist	250	3:43
13.	"Regular" (English version)	Wilbart "Vedo" McCoy III; Taeyong; Mark	Mike Daley; Mitchell Owens; Wilbart "Vedo" McCoy III; George Kranz; Yoo Young-jin	Mike Daley; Mitchell Owens	3:39
14.	"Run Back 2 U" (Bonus track)	Kim Min-seok; Double Dragon	Donald "haZEL" Sales; Double Dragon	Double Dragon	3:39
Total length:					51:00

== Credits and personnel ==
Credits adapted from Xiami.

- Seo Mi-rae (Butterfly) – vocal directing (track 1,3-5,11), background vocals (track 3), digital editing (track 1,3-4,11)
- GDLO (MonoTree) – vocal directing (track 2,9,12-14), digital editing (track 2,9,12-13)
- Chu Dae-kwan (MonoTree) – vocal directing (track 6,14)
- Deez – vocal directing (track 10)
- Andrew Choi – vocal directing (track 13), background vocals (track 1,10)
- Double Dragon (Hot Sauce Music Group) – vocal directing (track 14), digital editing (track 14)
- Kim Dong-hyun – rap directing (track 7)
- 250 – rap directing (track 7), digital editing (track 7)
- NCT 127 – vocals, background vocals
  - Taeil – vocals, background vocals (track 7,12)
  - Johnny – vocals, background vocals (track 8,12)
  - Taeyong – vocals, background vocals (track 7,12)
  - Yuta – vocals, background vocals (track 7-8,12)
  - Doyoung – vocals, background vocals (track 4-5,7,12)
  - Jaehyun – vocals, background vocals (track 7,12)
  - Winwin – vocals, background vocals (track 8,12)
  - Jungwoo – vocals, background vocals (track 7-8,12)
  - Mark – vocals, background vocals (track 7,12)
  - Haechan – vocals, background vocals (track 12)
- Micah Powell – background vocals (track 1)
- DAWN – background vocals (track 2)
- Wilbart "Vedo" McCoy III – background vocals (track 2,13)
- Varren Wade – background vocals (track 3)
- Ra.D – background vocals (track 4)
- BrotherSu – background vocals (track 4)
- J. Roston – background vocals (track 5)
- OneStar (MonoTree) – background vocals (track 6)
- Bobii Lewis – background vocals (track 9), all instruments (track 9)
- Yoo Young-jin – background vocals (track 9), mixing engineer (track 6)
- Hwang Seong-je (Butterfly) – background vocals (track 11)
- Megan Bowen – background vocals (track 14)
- Kim Gyeong-min – piano (track 8)
- Hitchhicker – guitar (track 8), digital editing (track 8)
- ON the string – string (track 8)
- Choi Jin-seok – all instruments (track 9)
- Jeong Ho-jin – recording (track 1,8,11)
- Choi Jin-yeong – assistant recording (track 1,8,11)
- Kang Jae-gu – recording (track 1,4,11)
- Hong Su-yeon – assistant recording (track 1,4,11)
- Kwak Jeong-sin – recording (track 2,5-6,9,12-13)
- Jeong Mo-yeon – recording (track 2,5-6)
- Kwon Yoo-jin – recording (track 3)
- Hong Seong-jun – recording (track 4,7), digital editing (track 5-6)
- Chu Dae-kwan – recording (track 6)
- Sin Dae-seop – recording (track 8)
- Jeong Gi-hong – recording (track 8)
- Choi Da-in – recording (track 8)
- Lee Chan-mi – assistant recording (track 8)
- On Seong-yoon – recording (track 8,10)
- Lee Ji-hong – recording (track 10), digital editing (track 9-10,14), mixing engineer (track 2,5,7,9-10,12-14)
- An Chang-gyu – recording (track 10)
- Lee Min-gyu – recording (track 13-14), mixing engineer (track 1,3-4,11), mixing (track 1)
- Juan "Jay P" Mendez – digital editing (track 2,13)
- Min Seong-soo – digital editing (track 2)
- Jang Woo-yeong – digital editing (track 4,9,12)
- Jung Eui-seok – digital editing (track 8), mixing (track 2,8,13)
- Kim Cheol-sun – mixing (track 3,5,12,14)
- Nam Gung-jin – mixing (track 4,6,11)
- Kim Han-gu – mixing (track 7)
- Goo Jong-pil (BeatBurger) – mixing (track 9-10)

=== Locations ===
Recording

- sound POOL studios
- GaeNaRi Sound
- The Vibe Studio
- doobdoob Studio
- MonoTree Studio
- YIREH STUDIO
- Seoul Studio
- SM Big Shot Studio

Editing

- doobdoob Studio
- GaeNaRi Sound
- SM LVYIN Studio

Mixing

- SM Big Shot Studio
- SM LVYIN Studio
- SM Blue Cup Studio
- SM Blue Ocean Studio
- SM Concert Hall Studio
- SM BOOMINSYSTEM
- SM Yellow Tail Studio
- sound POOL studios

== Charts ==
=== Album ===
Weekly chart performance for Regular-Irregular and Regulate
Chart (2018)	Peak position	
Chart (2018)	Regular- Irregular	Regulate
Australian Digital Albums (ARIA)	19	—
French Download Albums (SNEP)	43	—
Japanese Albums (Oricon)	6	—
Japanese Hot Albums (Billboard Japan)	24	—
South Korean Albums (Gaon)	1	2
UK Download Albums (OCC)	42	—
US Billboard 200	86	—
US Independent Albums (Billboard)	5	46
US World Albums (Billboard)	2	9
US Top Album Sales (Billboard)	23	—

Year-end charts for Regular-Irregular and Regulate
Chart (2018)	Position	
Chart (2018)	Regular- Irregular	Regulate
South Korean Albums (Gaon)	17	29
US World Albums (Billboard)	14	—

=== Single ===
"Regular" weekly charts
Chart (2018)	Peak position
Singapore (RIAS Regional)	6
South Korea (Gaon)	92
South Korea (Kpop Hot 100)	16
US World Digital Songs (Billboard)	2

"Simon Says" weekly charts
Chart (2018)	Peak position
New Zealand Hot Singles (RMNZ)	37
South Korea (Kpop Hot 100)	39
US World Digital Songs (Billboard)	1

== Sales ==
Sales of Regular-Irregular
Region	Sales
Japan (Oricon)	28,435
South Korea (Gaon)	370,616
United States (Billboard)	8,000

== Certifications ==
Region	Certification	Certified units/sales
South Korea (KMCA) Regular-Irregular	Platinum	250,000^{^}
South Korea (KMCA) Regulate	Platinum	250,000^{^}
^{^} Shipments figures based on certification alone.

== Accolades ==
Music program awards
Song	Program	Date
"Regular"	The Show	October 16, 2018
"Regular"	The Show	October 23, 2018
"Regular"	M Countdown	October 25, 2018
"Regular"	Music Bank	October 26, 2018

== Release history ==
Region	Date	Format	Label
South Korea	October 12, 2018	CD; digital download; streaming	SM Entertainment; iRIVER
United States	October 12, 2018	CD; digital download; streaming	SM Entertainment; iRIVER
Various	October 12, 2018	Digital download; streaming	SM Entertainment; iRIVER
