= Golden Age (album) =

2023 studio album by NCT

- Digital cover

Studio album by NCT
- Released: August 28, 2023
- Recorded: 2023
- Studio: SM Studios (Seoul)
- Genres: Hip-hop; R&B; EDM
- Length: 32:21
- Language: Korean
- Labels: SM; Kakao

NCT chronology
ISTJ (2023)	Golden Age (2023)	Fact Check (2023)

NCT studio albums chronology
Universe (2021)	Golden Age (2023)

Singles from Golden Age
- 1. "Golden Age" Released: August 23, 2023; 2. "Baggy Jeans" Released: August 28, 2023

Professional ratings
Review scores
Source	Rating
NME	4/5 stars

Golden Age is the fourth studio album by South Korean boy band NCT. It was released on August 28, 2023, by SM Entertainment. Similar to their previous releases NCT 2018 Empathy, NCT 2020 Resonance, and NCT 2021 Universe, Golden Age is part of "NCT 2023" project; which saw all current NCT members from several units collaborating on a full-length release. This time, the album features 20 members from three current units of NCT: NCT 127, NCT Dream, and WayV. The album consists of ten tracks with two singles released to support the album, the title track of the same name and "Baggy Jeans".

Golden Age is the first album release of NCT after the departure of three former members; Lucas, who departed from the group on May 10, 2023, after his hiatus since mid 2021, and Shotaro and Sungchan who were withdrawn from the group on May 24, 2023, to re-debut as a member of SM Entertainment's new boy group Riize in September of the same year. It is also the final full-group album to feature members Taeil and Mark, who left the group in 2024 and 2026 respesctively.

== Background and release ==
SM Entertainment announced NCT's fourth union project NCT 2023 on August 9, 2023, with the confirmation of the release of the group's fourth studio album Golden Age. It is the first NCT union project in a year and four months after the 2021 union project NCT 2021 Universe, which saw the release of the group's third studio album. All twenty current members of the group participated in the project, including Winwin who was absent from the 2021 project due to his personal schedule in China. The label also announced two singles which will be released to support the album, the lead single being "Golden Age", an all members track which was released on August 23, 2023, while the second single off the album is "Baggy Jeans", which saw the reunion of Taeyong, Doyoung, Ten, Jaehyun, and Mark, the first five debuted members of NCT who participated in the group's debut single "The 7th Sense", released on the same date as the album.

== Commercial performance ==
Golden Age debuted at number one on the Circle Weekly Album Chart in the chart issue dated August 27– September 2, 2023, with the debut sales of 961,463 units, making the album the fourth album for NCT as a whole group to top the chart. The album also topped the monthly chart of August 2023, with the first month sales of 955,109 units.

== Track listing ==
Golden Age track listing
No.	Title	Lyrics	Music	Arrangement	Length
1.	"Baggy Jeans" (NCT U; sung by Taeyong, Doyoung, Jaehyun, Ten, and Mark)	Wutan	Brice Fox; Griff Clawson; Jurek Reunamäki; Jinbyjin; Bobii Lewis; Moa "Cazzi Opeia" Carlebecker; Anne Judith Wik	Reunamäki; Jinbyjin	3:31
2.	"Call D" (NCT U; sung by Taeyong and Ten)	Jung Il-li (Jam Factory)	1-800-Rudeboy; Je'Juan Antonio; Hassan Ashi Jr.; Jordain Johnson; Hautboi Rich	1-800-Rudeboy	3:36
3.	"Pado" (NCT U; sung by Johnny, Taeyong, Jaehyun, Mark, Xiaojun, Hendery, and Haechan)	Liljune (153/Joombas)	Humbler; Davey Nate; Timothy "C Minor" Zimnoch	Humbler	2:58
4.	"Interlude: Oasis" (NCT U; sung by Yuta, Jaehyun, Winwin, Jaemin, and Chenle)	Park Yoo-eun (Jam Factory)	Tia' Pickrom; Charles Anderson; Michael Foster; Pacific Zagabe; Thomas Lumpkins	Tommy Parker; Social House; Pacific	2:07
5.	"The Bat" (NCT U; sung by Taeil, Johnny, Yuta, Jungwoo, Hendery, Jeno, and Jisung)	Wutan	Brandon Arreaga; Jackson Morgan; Kaelyn Behr; MZMC	Styalz Fuego; MZMC	2:50
6.	"Alley Oop" (NCT U; sung by Yuta, Winwin, Hendery, Jeno, Jaemin, Yangyang, and Jisung)	Danke (Lalala Studio)	Greg Bonnick; Hayden Chapman; Justin Starling; Josue Janv'ier	LDN Noise	3:38
7.	"That's Not Fair" (NCT U; sung by Johnny, Taeyong, Ten, Mark, Jeno, and Yangyang)	Hash Swan	Evan Magee; Parker James Nornes; Gigi Grombacher; Tony Ferrari; Noah Conrad	Conrad	3:01
8.	"Kangaroo" (NCT U; sung by Taeil, Kun, Renjun, Yangyang, Chenle, and Jisung)	Cian (153/Joombas)	El Capitxn; Vendors (Zenur); San Yoon; Casper; Yuki	El Capitxn; Vendors; Yoon; Casper; Yuki	3:36
9.	"Not Your Fault" (NCT U; sung by Taeil, Kun, Doyoung, Ten, Jungwoo, Xiaojun and Renjun)	Moon Ji-young (Lalala Studio)	Tiyon 'TC' Mack; Tesung Kim; Gibum; Ryu Jin-wook; Lee Kang-sung	Mack; Kim; Gibum; Ryu; Lee	3:21
10.	"Golden Age" (NCT 2023)	Jang Han-bit (Jam Factory)	Jake K (Artiffect); MCK (Artiffect); Carlebecker; Ellen Berg; Josh McClelland; Ryan Lawrie	Jake K; MCK	3:38
Total length:					32:21

== Charts ==
=== Weekly charts ===
Weekly chart performance for Golden Age
Chart (2023)	Peak position
Japanese Albums (Oricon)	1
Japanese Combined Albums (Oricon)	1
Japanese Hot Albums (Billboard Japan)	3
South Korean Albums (Circle)	1
Swedish Physical Albums (Sverigetopplistan)	18
US Billboard 200	66
US Independent Albums (Billboard)	12
US World Albums (Billboard)	2

=== Monthly charts ===
Monthly chart performance for Golden Age
Chart	Position
Japanese Albums (Oricon)	9
South Korean Albums (Circle)	1

=== Year-end charts ===
Year-end chart performance for Golden Age
Chart (2023)	Position
Japanese Albums (Oricon)	56
Japanese Hot Albums (Billboard Japan)	55
South Korean Albums (Circle)	37

== Certifications ==
Certifications for Golden Age
Region	Certification	Certified units/sales
South Korea (KMCA)	Million	1,000,000^{^}
^{^} Shipments figures based on certification alone.

== Release history ==
Release history for Golden Age
Region	Date	Format	Label
Various	August 28, 2023	Digital download; streaming	SM; Kakao
South Korea	August 28, 2023	CD	SM; Kakao
United States	September 29, 2023	CD	SM
Canada	September 29, 2023	CD	SM
