= Taeyong =

South Korean rapper and singer (born 1995)

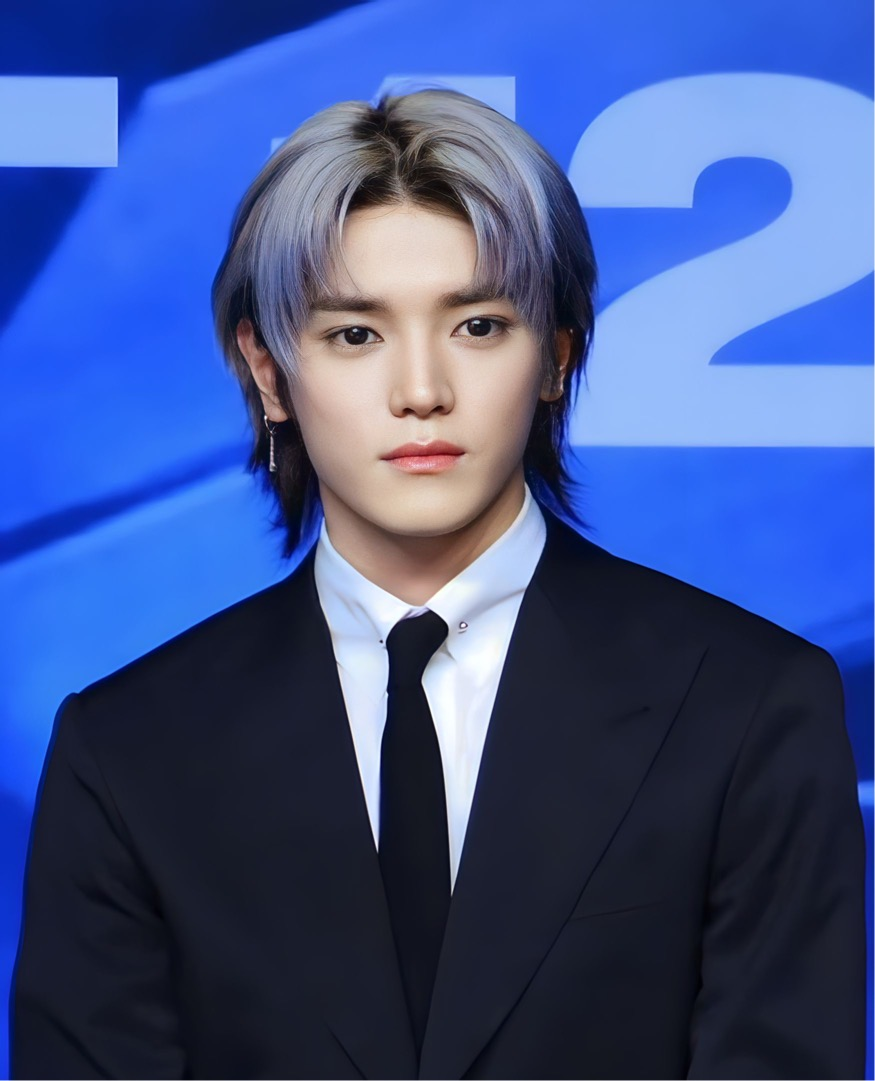
- Taeyong in October 2023
- Born: Lee Tae-yong; July 1, 1995 (age 31); Seoul, South Korea
- Education: School of Performing Arts Seoul
- Occupations: Rapper; singer; songwriter; dancer
- Years active: 2013–present
- Musical career
- Genres: K-pop; hip-hop
- Instrument: Vocals
- Labels: SM; Avex Trax; Capitol
- Member of: NCT; NCT 127; SuperM; SM Town
- Formerly of: SM Rookies
- Website: Official website

Korean name
- Hangul: 이태용
- RR: I Taeyong
- MR: I T'aeyong

Lee Tae-yong (Korean: 이태용; born July 1, 1995), known mononymously as Taeyong (stylized in all caps), is a South Korean rapper, singer, songwriter, and dancer. He is a member and leader of South Korean boy band NCT under SM Entertainment, having debuted in the group's first sub-unit, NCT U, in 2016 and becoming the leader of its second sub-unit, NCT 127, later that year. In 2019, he debuted as a member of the South Korean supergroup SuperM, a joint project under SM Entertainment and Capitol Records. As a songwriter, Taeyong has participated in writing over 70 songs in four languages, released mostly by NCT's various units and himself as a soloist. He made his official solo debut in June 2023 with his EP Shalala, making him the first soloist from NCT.

== Life and career ==
=== Early life ===
Lee Taeyong was born on July 1, 1995, in Gwanak-gu, Seoul, South Korea. He graduated from the School of Performing Arts Seoul.

=== 2012–2016: Pre-debut activities ===
In 2012, Taeyong was scouted on the street by an SM Entertainment recruiter and joined the company after successfully passing the audition by singing the South Korean national anthem. In the same year, he participated in the poster shooting of the SBS television series To the Beautiful You. On December 2, 2013, Taeyong was introduced as a member of SM Rookies, a pre-debut team of trainees under SM Entertainment.

In 2014, Taeyong appeared in multiple magazines alongside now-NCT member Johnny and now-Red Velvet members Irene and Seulgi. In July 2014, a video of Taeyong performing part of his song "Open the Door" was published on SMTown's YouTube channel. Later that year, he appeared with several future NCT members on the Mnet-produced Exo 90:2014, a show starring labelmates Exo, where they danced to K-pop songs from the 1990s. Taeyong also participated in the music video remake of Shinhwa's "Yo!" and Fly To The Sky's "Missing You". In October 2014, he featured on Red Velvet's song "Be Natural", credited then as SR14B Taeyong.

=== 2016–2018: Debuts with NCT, NCT U, and NCT 127 ===
On April 3, 2016, Taeyong was confirmed as a member of boy group NCT and its first sub-unit, NCT U. He made his official debut with the release of NCT U's digital single "The 7th Sense" on April 8, in which he and Mark participated in songwriting. Later that year, Taeyong was announced as a member and leader of NCT's second sub-unit, the Seoul-based NCT 127. On July 6, 2016, he made his debut with NCT 127 with their single "Fire Truck". Three days later, they released their first extended play (EP), NCT #127, for which Taeyong co-wrote three songs. He became the group's main rapper and main dancer despite having no background in dance prior to his training and his dance coach expressing doubts whether he would be able to catch up with his peers.

In January 2017, NCT 127 returned with the EP Limitless. Taeyong participated in writing four songs on the album, with the track "Baby Don't Like It" marking the first time he was credited as a composer. In June, the group released their third EP, Cherry Bomb. All songs on the album, save one, were co-written by Taeyong. The title track, "Cherry Bomb", was later named as one of the best K-pop songs of the year by Billboard and Idolator. That same year, Taeyong participated in two collaborations with fellow SM Entertainment artists Hitchhiker and Yoo Young-jin. "Around", an experimental song produced by Hitchhiker, was released with an accompanying music video in May through the SM Station project. He worked with singer and producer Yoo Young-jin on the rock ballad "Cure", which was released in August 2017, also through SM Station. Together with NCT 127's vocalists Taeil and Doyoung, Taeyong appeared on the soundtrack for the drama School 2017, featuring as rapper in and songwriter for the R&B ballad "Stay in My Life".

In March 2018, NCT released their first studio album as part of a large-scale project uniting all of its sub-units, NCT 2018 Empathy. Taeyong appeared in five of the units featured on the album and participated in writing five songs for Empathy. In May 2018, Taeyong joined the cast of Food Diary, a variety show following a group of celebrities exploring farming and the process of food production, together with labelmate BoA.

Taeyong co-wrote four songs for NCT 127's first studio album, Regular-Irregular, including lead single "Regular". The song was initially released in English and Korean but later also served as the debut single of NCT's Chinese sub-unit, WayV.

=== 2019–2020: Debut with SuperM and group activities ===
In April 2019, NCT 127 released their first Japanese studio album, Awaken, for which Taeyong co-wrote the song "Lips". In July 2019, Taeyong released his first solo song, "Long Flight", which he wrote and co-composed, with an accompanying music video. The track served as the finale of the third season of the SM Station project. The song debuted at number six on Billboard World Digital Song Sales chart. On August 8, 2019, Taeyong was revealed as a member of SuperM, a K-pop supergroup created by SM Entertainment in collaboration with Capitol Records. The group's promotions began in October and were aimed towards the American market. They released their first EP, SuperM, for which Taeyong co-wrote and co-produced the song "No Manners". Also in August, Taeyong and Punch collaborated on a soundtrack song for television series Hotel del Luna, titled "Love del Luna". Later that year, Taeyong featured on Marteen's "Mood".

In March 2020, NCT 127 released their second studio album, Neo Zone, in which Taeyong participated in co-writing three tracks for the album. It was commercially successful and debuted at number five on the US Billboard 200, selling more than one million copies in South Korea together with its repackage, Neo Zone: The Final Round. Later that year, SuperM released their first studio album, Super One, for which Taeyong co-wrote the song "Together At Home". In September 2020, NCT's second group-wide project, NCT 2020: Resonance, was announced, and Taeyong was confirmed as the leader of the group as a whole.

=== 2021–present: Solo activities and soloist debut ===
In March 2021, Taeyong started his own SoundCloud account and released a self-written demo single "Dark Clouds" and its remix. Since then, he released several demo singles such as "GTA1" and "GTA2", "Blue", "Monroe" (featuring Baekhyun of Exo), "Rose" (featuring Seulgi of Red Velvet) and "Swimming Pool" on the platform. "Dark Clouds" won the Top Comments Award at the SoundCloud 2021 Playback Awards, with the most fan comments in a single week on the platform in 2021. Taeyong served as a judge on Korean dance survival reality show Street Woman Fighter in August the same year, which gained significant popularity nationwide. He later appeared as a guest judge on the program's spin-off, Street Dance Girls Fighter, together with fellow NCT member Mark. Taeyong co-wrote the title track for NCT 127's third studio album Sticker released in September 2021, which went on to become the best-selling album in SM Entertainment history. He was credited as a choreographer and lyricist on the special album 2021 Winter SM Town: SMCU Express, having worked on the track "Zoo".

In March 2022, Taeyong participated as a feature in Suran's song "Diamond" from her EP Flyin' Part 1. Taeyong later announced the opening of his YouTube channel TY Track, where he then released performance videos throughout the year for his song "Lonely" featuring Suran and "Ghost". On April 14, Taeyong released his official second single "Love Theory" in collaboration with Wonstein through SM Station, in which he participated in the songwriting. Taeyong joined another Mnet's dance reality show Any Body Can Dance as the MC, which premiered in June 2022.

Taeyong made his official debut as a solo artist with his EP Shalala in June 2023, making him the first soloist of his group NCT.

In February 2024, after his first solo concert <TY Track>, Taeyong released his second extended play Tap. The EP, fully co-written by Taeyong, ranked first on the iTunes Top Albums Chart in 33 regions around the world.

On May 18, 2026, he released his first studio album WYLD.

== Personal life ==
In 2018, it was revealed that Taeyong is third cousins with Hong Seok-cheon.

=== Philanthropy ===
In 2025, Taeyong donated 100 million won to the Red Cross to support victims of the South Korean forest fires.

=== Military service ===
On March 18, 2024, SM Entertainment announced that Taeyong would enlist in the Republic of Korea Navy on April 15 and serve in its military band. He fulfilled his mandatory military service as an active-duty cultural promotion soldier in the public-relations unit of the Navy Band and Honor Guard Battalion from April 15, 2024, until his discharge on December 14, 2025.

== Endorsements ==
In 2023, Spanish luxury brand Loewe appointed Taeyong as their new global ambassador after having built a relationship with the brand through fashion week appearances. He featured in Loewe's Spring 2024 Pre-collection Campaign. Taeyong was the face of the Loewe Paula's Ibiza Cosmic EDP fragrance campaign in April 2024. Taeyong appeared on the June 2024 cover of Singles Magazine as the newest brand ambassador for Benefit Cosmetics Korea.

== Discography ==
=== Studio albums ===
List of studio albums, showing selected details, chart positions, and sales figures
Title	Details	Peak chart positions			Sales
Title	Details	KOR	JPN	US Sales	Sales
WYLD	Released: May 18, 2026; Label: SM, Kakao; Formats: CD, digital download, streaming	3	15	25	KOR: 298,721; JPN: 4,391

=== Extended plays ===
List of extended plays, with selected details, chart positions, sales figures, and certifications
Title	Details	Peak chart positions		Sales	Certifications
Title	Details	KOR	JPN	Sales	Certifications
Shalala	Released: June 5, 2023; Label: SM, Kakao; Formats: CD, digital download, streaming	2	8	KOR: 506,288; JPN: 12,250	KMCA: Platinum
Tap	Released: February 26, 2024; Label: SM, Kakao; Formats: CD, digital download, streaming	3	8	KOR: 285,548; JPN: 15,266	KMCA: Platinum

=== Singles ===
==== As lead artist ====
List of leading singles, showing year released, chart positions, and name of the album
Title	Year	Peak chart position				Album
Title	Year	KOR	NZ Hot	SGP Reg.	US World	Album
"Around" (with Hitchhiker)	2017	—	—	—	—	SM Station Season 2
"Cure" (함께) (with Yoo Young-jin)	2017	—	—	—	—	SM Station Season 2
"Long Flight"	2019	—	—	—	6	SM Station Season 3
"Zoo" (with Hendery, Jeno, Yangyang, Giselle)	2021	— (Note: "Zoo" did not enter the Gaon Digital Chart, but peaked at number 130 on the Gaon Download Chart.)	38	15	—	2021 Winter SM Town: SMCU Express
"Love Theory" (with Wonstein)	2022	139	—	—	8	SM Station Season 4
"Jet" (with Eunhyuk, Hyo, Taeyong, Jaemin, Sungchan and Winter)	2022	— (Note: "Jet" did not enter the Circle Digital Chart, but debuted and peaked at number 108 on the component Download Chart.)	—	—	—	2022 Winter SM Town: SMCU Palace
"Shalala"	2023	16	—	—	—	Shalala
"Tap"	2024	14	—	—	—	Tap
"Rock Solid" (with Anderson .Paak)	2026	— (Note: "Rock Solid" did not enter the Circle Digital Chart but peaked at position 54 on the component Download Chart.)	—	—	—	Non-album single
"WYLD"	2026	22	—	—	—	WYLD
"—" indicates that the song did not chart or was not released in that region.

==== As featured artist ====
List of featured singles, showing year released, chart positions, sales figures, and name of the album
Title	Year	Peak chart position	Sales	Album
Title	Year	KOR	Sales	Album
"Be Natural" (Red Velvet featuring Taeyong)	2014	33	KOR: 65,820+	Non-album single
"City Lights" (夜話) (U-Know featuring Taeyong)	2018	—	—N/a	New Chapter No. 2: The Truth of Love
"Time" (Hitchhiker featuring Sunny and Hyoyeon of SNSD, and Taeyong)	2018	—	—N/a	Non-album single
"Mood" (Marteen featuring Taeyong)	2019	—	—N/a	8
"Diamonds" (Suran featuring Taeyong)	2022	—	—N/a	Flyin' Part 1
"Skip" (Kangta featuring Taeyong)	2022	—	—N/a	Eyes on You
"—" indicates that the song did not chart or was not released in that region.

==== Promotional singles ====
List of promotional singles, showing year released, and name of the album
Title	Year	Album
"Open the Door"	2014	Non-album single

=== Soundtrack appearances ===
List of soundtrack appearances, showing year released, chart positions, and name of the album
Title	Year	Peak chart position		Album
Title	Year	KOR	KOR Billb. (Note: Includes the Billboard K-pop Hot 100 (defunct as of 2022), and South Korea Songs (part of Billboard's Hits of the World (2022 onwards)).)	Album
"Stay in My Life" (with Taeil and Doyoung of NCT)	2017	—	—	School 2017 OST Part 4
"Love del Luna" (with Punch)	2019	46	87	Hotel Del Luna OST Part 13
"Lit" (Prod. by Czaer) (with Mark of NCT)	2022	—	—	Street Man Fighter Vol.4 (Crew Song) OST
"Swipe" (Prod. by C-Young, Alawn) (with Ten of NCT)	2023	199	—	Street Woman Fighter 2 OST Part 2
"Bitter Sweet (Addiction)" (with Haechan of NCT)	2026	— (Note: "Bitter Sweet (Addiction)" did not enter the Circle Digital Chart but peaked at position 81 on the component Download Chart.)	—	Mad Concrete Dreams OST Part 2
"—" indicates that the song did not chart or was not released in that region.

=== Non-commercial releases ===
List of non-commercial songs, showing title, year released and featured artist
Title	Year	Featured artist	Ref.
"Dark Clouds"	2021	—N/a	
"Dark Clouds (Remix)"	2021	—N/a	
"GTA 1"	2021	—N/a	
"GTA 2" (Note: "GTA 2" is the demo version of "Virtual Insanity", a track in Taeyong's debut EP Shalala.)	2021	—N/a	
"Blue"	2021	—N/a	
"Monroe"	2021	Baekhyun	
"Rose"	2021	Seulgi	
"Swimming Pool"	2021	—N/a	
"Lonely"	2022	Suran	
"Ghost"	2022	—N/a	
"Fine"	2022	—N/a	

=== Songwriting credits ===
All credits are adapted from the Korea Music Copyright Association, unless stated otherwise.

Key
†	Indicates single release

List of songs, showing featured performers, associated album, credited lyricist(s) or composer(s), and year released
Year	Song	Artist	Album	Lyrics		Music		Notes
Year	Song	Artist	Album	Credited	With	Credited	With	Notes
2016	"The 7th Sense" †	NCT U	NCT 2018 Empathy	Yes	Jeon Ji-eun; Hwang Seon-jeong; Kim Jeong-mi; Kim Dong-hyun; Cho Jin-joo; Mark	No	—N/a	—N/a
2016	"Firetruck" †	NCT 127	NCT #127	Yes	Mark; Jaehyun; Lee Seu-ran	No	—N/a	—N/a
2016	"Mad City"	NCT 127	NCT #127	Yes	Mark; Taeyong; Double Dragon	No	—N/a	Performed by Taeyong, Jaehyun and Mark
2017	"Good Thing"	NCT 127	Limitless	Yes	JQ (Makeumine Works); Hyun Ji-won (Makeumine Works); Mark	No	—N/a	—N/a
2017	"Back 2 U (AM 01:27)"	NCT 127	Limitless	Yes	Jeon Ji-eun; Hwang Seon-jeong; Kim Jeong-mi	No	—N/a	—N/a
2017	"Baby Don't Like It"	NCT 127	Limitless	Yes	G.Soul; Mark	Yes	Jamil "Digi" Chammas; Jeremy "Tay" Jasper; Jonathan "Perky Rain" Perkins; MZMC; G.Soul; Mark	Performed by Taeil, Taeyong, Doyoung, Mark and Haechan
2017	"Angel"	NCT 127	Limitless	Yes	Kevin Oppa (mr. cho); Mark	No	—N/a	—N/a
2017	"Around" †	Hitchhiker x Taeyong	Non-album single	Yes	Kim Bu-min	No	—N/a	Released as part of the SM Station Season 2 project
2017	"Cherry Bomb" †	NCT 127	Cherry Bomb	Yes	Mark; Deepflow; Lim Jung-hyo; Oh Min-joo	No	—N/a	—N/a
2017	"Running 2 U"	NCT 127	Cherry Bomb	Yes	Mark; JQ; Kim Jin (Makeumine Works)	No	—N/a	—N/a
2017	"0 Mile"	NCT 127	Cherry Bomb	Yes	Mark; Jo Yoon-kyung; Cho Jin-joo; Choi So-young; Park Yong-joon	No	—N/a	—N/a
2017	"Whiplash"	NCT 127	Cherry Bomb	Yes	Mark; JQ; Oneru (Makeumine Works); Xitsuh	No	—N/a	Performed by Jaehyun, Mark, Taeyong, Doyoung and Taeil
2017	"Summer 127"	NCT 127	Cherry Bomb	Yes	Mark; $ÜN (Joombas); Bae Min-soo (Joombas); seizetheday (Joombas); CiaNo (Joombas); Kim In-hyung	No	—N/a	—N/a
2017	"Cure"	Yoo Young-jin x Taeyong	Non-album single	Yes	Yoo Young-jin; Yoo Ji-won	No	—N/a	Released as part of the SM Station Season 2 project
2017	"Stay in My Life"	NCT (Taeil, Doyoung, Taeyong)	School 2017 OST	Yes	Park Geun-cheol; Jeong Su-min	No	—N/a	—N/a
2018	"Boss" †	NCT U	NCT 2018 Empathy	Yes	Wutan; Yoo Young-jin; Mark	No	—N/a	—N/a
2018	"Baby Don't Stop" †	NCT U	NCT 2018 Empathy	Yes	Danke (lalala Studio); Juno (Joombas)	No	—N/a	Performed by Taeyong and Ten
2018	"Yestoday" †	NCT U	NCT 2018 Empathy	Yes	Jung Joo-hee; Mark; Steven Lee; Cho Jin-joo	No	—N/a	Performed by Taeyong, Doyoung, Lucas, and Mark
2018	"Yestoday(Extended Ver.)"	NCT U	NCT 2018 Empathy	Yes	Jung Joo-hee; Mark; Steven Lee; Cho Jin-joo	No	—N/a	Performed by Taeyong, Doyoung, Lucas, and Mark
2018	"Black on Black" †	NCT 2018	NCT 2018 Empathy	Yes	MINOS; Mark; Deez	No	—N/a	—N/a
2018	"City 127"	NCT 127	Regular-Irregular	Yes	JQ; Moon Hee-yeon (Makeumine Works); Mark	Yes	The Stereotypes; Micah Powell; Clarence Coffee Jr.	—N/a
2018	"Regular" †	NCT 127	Regular-Irregular	Yes	Coogie (ATM Seoul); Tommy $trate; Mark	No	—N/a	—N/a
2018	"My Van"	NCT 127	Regular-Irregular	Yes	Kim Dong-hyun; Mark	No	—N/a	Performed by Taeyong, Yuta, Jaehyun, Jungwoo, and Mark
2018	"Come Back"	NCT 127	Regular-Irregular	Yes	Bong Eun-young; Ryu Da-som; Mark	No	—N/a	—N/a
2018	"Regular" (English ver.)	NCT 127	Regular-Irregular	Yes	Wilbart "Vedo" McCoy III; Mark	No	—N/a	—N/a
2018	"Welcome to My Playground"	NCT 127	Regular-Irregular	Yes	Seo Ji-eum; Ra.D; BrotherSu; Mark	No	—N/a	—N/a
2018	"City Lights"	U-Know (feat. Taeyong)	New Chapter No. 2: The Truth of Love	Yes	Hwang Yoo-bin	No	—N/a	—N/a
2018	"What We Talkin' Bout"	NCT 127 (feat. Marteen)	Up Next Session: NCT 127	Yes	Mark; Marteen	No	—N/a	—N/a
2019	"Lips"	NCT 127	Awaken	Yes	Akira; Mark	No	—N/a	—N/a
2019	"Long Flight" †	Taeyong	Non-album single	Yes	—N/a	Yes	Royal Dive	Released as part of the SM Station Season 3 project
2019	"No Manners"	SuperM	SuperM	Yes	Kim Ran; Cho Yu-ri	Yes	Jonathan Santana; Shae Jacobs; Tyler Holmes	Performed by Taemin, Kai, Taeyong and Ten
2019	"Mood"	Marteen (feat. Taeyong)	8	Yes	M. Estevez; J. Roman; J. Brady; A. Hayes	No	—N/a	—N/a
2020	"Pandora Box"	NCT 127	Neo Zone	Yes	JQ; Hyeon Ji-won (Makeumine Works); Kim Hye-ji (Makeumine Works); Mark; Johnny	No	—N/a	—N/a
2020	"Mad Dog"	NCT 127	Neo Zone	Yes	Kim Boo-min; Mark	No	—N/a	Performed by Taeil, Doyoung, Mark and Taeyong
2020	"Love Song"	NCT 127	Neo Zone	Yes	Seo Ji-eum; Mark; Johnny	No	—N/a	—N/a
2020	"Together at Home"	SuperM	Super One	Yes	Lee Seu-ran; Mark	No	—N/a	—N/a
2021	"Dark Clouds"	Taeyong	Non-album release	Yes	—N/a	Yes	Royal Dive	Released on SoundCloud
2021	"Dark Clouds (Remix)"	Taeyong	Non-album release	Yes	—N/a	Yes	Royal Dive	Released on SoundCloud
2021	"GTA 1"	Taeyong	Non-album release	Yes	—N/a	Yes	Royal Dive	Released on SoundCloud
2021	"GTA 2"	Taeyong	Non-album release	Yes	—N/a	Yes	Royal Dive	Released on SoundCloud
2021	"Blue"	Taeyong	Non-album release	Yes	—N/a	Yes	Zayson; Squar (Blur)	Released on SoundCloud
2021	"Monroe"	Taeyong x Baekhyun	Non-album release	Yes	—N/a	Yes	Squar	Released on SoundCloud
2021	"Rose"	Taeyong x Seulgi	Non-album release	Yes	Seulgi	Yes	Seulgi; Squar	Released on SoundCloud
2021	"Swimming Pool"	Taeyong	Non-album release	Yes	—N/a	Yes	Zayson	Released on SoundCloud
2021	"Sticker" †	NCT 127	Sticker	Yes	Yoo Young-jin; Mark	No	—N/a	—N/a
2021	"New Axis"	NCT U	Universe	Yes	Mark; Rick Bridges	No	—N/a	Performed by Taeyong, Mark and Yangyang
2021	"Beautiful" †	NCT 2021	Universe	Yes	Yoo Young-jin; Mark; Johnny; Jeno; Hendery	No	—N/a	—N/a
2021	"Amino Acid"	NCT 127	Non-album single	Yes	—N/a	Yes	Royal Dive	Original soundtrack of Analog Trip NCT 127
2021	"Zoo"	Taeyong, Jeno, Hendery, Yangyang, Giselle	2021 Winter SM Town: SMCU Express	Yes	Rick Bridges; Jeno; Giselle	No	—N/a	—N/a
2022	"Diamonds" †	Suran (feat. Taeyong)	Flyin' Part 1	Yes	Suran; Zayson	Yes	Suran; Zayson; Brian Cho	—N/a
2022	"Lonely"	Taeyong (feat. Suran)	Non-album release	Yes	Royal Dive	Yes	Royal Dive	Released on YouTube
2022	"Love Theory" †	Taeyong x Wonstein	Non-album single	Yes	Wonstein; Zayson	Yes	Wonstein; Zayson	—N/a
2022	"Skip"	Kangta (feat. Taeyong)	Eyes On You	Yes	Lee Hyo-jae	Yes	Ryan "Rykeyz" Williamson; Albert Stanaj; Mike Sabath; Britten Newbill	—N/a
2022	"Time Lapse"	NCT 127	2 Baddies	Yes	Mark; Jeong Ha-ri	No	—N/a	—N/a
2022	"Designer"	NCT 127	2 Baddies	Yes	Mark; Kim Jae-won	No	—N/a	—N/a
2022	"Lit (Prod. Czaer)"	Taeyong, Mark	Street Man Fighter Vol.4 (Crew Song)	Yes	Mark	No	—N/a	—N/a
2022	"Fine"	Taeyong	Non-album release	Yes	—N/a	Yes	Saimon	Released on SoundCloud
2022	"The Cure"	Kangta, BoA, U-Know, Leeteuk, Taeyeon, Onew, Suho, Irene, Taeyong, Mark, Kun, and Karina	2022 Winter SM Town: SMCU Palace	Yes	Hwang Yu-bin; Mark	No	—N/a	—N/a
2023	"DJ"	NCT 127	Ay-yo	Yes	Mark; Ellie Suh; Abernathy Dwayne Allen	Yes	Mark; Xydo; Abernathy Dwayne Allen	—N/a
2023	"Skyscraper"	NCT 127	Ay-yo	Yes	Mark; Simon Petren; Na Jung-ah; Oberg Andreas Gusatv Erik; Hanna Ninos; Burgrust Ricardo M	Yes	Mark; Simon Petren; Oberg Andreas Gusatv Erik; Hanna Ninos; Burgrust Ricardo M	—N/a
2023	"Shalala" †	Taeyong	Shalala	Yes	Omega Sapien; 차메인 (ChaMane)	Yes	Devine Channel; Omega Sapien; 차메인 (ChaMane); Park Young Kwang; denzelworldpeace	—N/a
2023	"Gwando"	Taeyong	Shalala	Yes	—N/a	Yes	Royal Dive; Saimon	—N/a
2023	"Move Mood Mode"	Taeyong (feat. Wendy)	Shalala	Yes	—N/a	Yes	Squar (PixelWave)	—N/a
2023	"Virtual Insanity"	Taeyong	Shalala	Yes	—N/a	Yes	Royal Dive	Reworked version of "GTA 2"
2023	"Ruby"	Taeyong	Shalala	Yes	—N/a	Yes	$ÜN; Saimon	—N/a
2023	"404 File Not Found"	Taeyong	Shalala	Yes	—N/a	Yes	Zayson	—N/a
2023	"Back to the Past"	Taeyong	Shalala	Yes	—N/a	Yes	Royal Dive	—N/a
2023	"Angel Eyes"	NCT 127	Fact Check	Yes	Ellie Suh (153/Joombas); Mark	Yes	James "JHart" Abrahart; Jeremy Dussolliet; Johnny Simpson; Jackson Foote; Jack Avery; Jonah Marais; Corbyn Besson; Mark	—N/a
2023	"Love Is A Beauty"	NCT 127	Fact Check	Yes	Taeil; Yuhwa; Mark	Yes	The Breed; Mizzy Lott; San Yoon; Mark	—N/a
2023	"Misty"	NCT 127	Fact Check	Yes	Kang Eun-jeong; Mark	Yes	Charli Taft; Thomas Sardorf; Daniel Obi Klein; Mark	—N/a
2023	"White Lie (하얀 거짓말)"	NCT 127	Be There for Me	Yes	Hwang Yu-bin (XYXX); Mark	Yes	9rota; Nmore; Gabriel Brandes; Mark	—N/a
2024	"Tap" †	Taeyong	Tap	Yes	—N/a	Yes	Squar (PixelWave)	—N/a
2024	"Moon Tour"	Taeyong	Tap	Yes	—N/a	Yes	Squar (PixelWave)	—N/a
2024	"Run Away"	Taeyong	Tap	Yes	—N/a	Yes	Squar (PixelWave)	—N/a
2024	"Ape"	Taeyong	Tap	Yes	—N/a	Yes	Squar (PixelWave)	—N/a
2024	"Ups & Downs" (나에게 했던 것과 같이)	Taeyong	Tap	Yes	—N/a	Yes	Squar (PixelWave)	—N/a
2024	"404 Loading"	Taeyong	Tap	Yes	—N/a	Yes	Zayson	—N/a
2026	"Rock Solid"	Taeyong, Anderson .Paak	TBA	Yes	Dwayne Abernathy Jr.; Brandon Perry; Brandon Anderson	Yes	Dwayne Abernathy Jr.; Brandon Perry; Brandon Anderson	—N/a

== Concerts ==
- TY Track (2024)
- TY Track – Remastered (2026)

== Filmography ==
=== Television appearances ===
Year	Title	Notes	Ref.
2018	Food Diary	Regular cast	
2021	Street Woman Fighter	Judge	
2022	Any Body Can Dance	MC	

=== Music videos ===
List of music videos showing year released and directors
Title	Year	Director(s)	Ref.
"Be Natural" (Red Velvet feat. Taeyong)	2014	Kwon Soon-wook	
"Around" (with Hitchhiker)	2017	Hitchhiker	
"Cure" (with Yoo Young-jin)	2017	Kim Jinsoo (VAM)	
"Long Flight"	2019	Sunnyvisual	
"Love Theory" (with Wonstein)	2022	Kang Mingi (aarch)	
"Shalala"	2023	Lafic	
"Tap"	2024	Seong Chang-won	
"WYLD"	2026	Lafic	

== Awards and nominations ==
Name of the award ceremony, year presented, category, nominee of the award, and the result of the nomination
Award ceremony	Year	Category	Nominee / Work	Result	Ref.
Hanteo Music Awards	2025	Global Artist – Africa	Taeyong	Nominated	
Hanteo Music Awards	2025	Global Artist – Asia	Taeyong	Nominated	
Hanteo Music Awards	2025	Global Artist – Europe	Taeyong	Nominated	
Hanteo Music Awards	2025	Global Artist – Oceania	Taeyong	Nominated	
Hanteo Music Awards	2025	Global Artist – North America	Taeyong	Nominated	
Hanteo Music Awards	2025	Global Artist – South America	Taeyong	Nominated	
K-Global Heart Dream Awards	2023	K-Global Bonsang (Main Prize)	Taeyong	Won	
K-Global Heart Dream Awards	2023	K-Global Reporter's Choice Artist Award	Taeyong	Won	
MAMA Awards	2023	Song of the Year	"Shalala"	Longlisted	
MAMA Awards	2023	Best Dance Performance – Male Solo	"Shalala"	Nominated	
MAMA Awards	2023	Album of the Year	Shalala	Longlisted	
MAMA Awards	2024	Song of the Year	"Tap"	Nominated	
MAMA Awards	2024	Best Dance Performance – Male Solo	"Tap"	Longlisted	
Melon Music Awards	2024	Millions' Top 10 Artists	Tap	Nominated	
Seoul Music Awards	2024	Hallyu Special Award	Taeyong	Nominated	
Seoul Music Awards	2024	Main Award (Bonsang)	Taeyong	Nominated	
Seoul Music Awards	2024	Popularity Award	Taeyong	Nominated	
Universal Superstar Awards	2024	Universal K-pop Icon	Taeyong	Won	
