= Shalala =

Shalala may refer to:

- Shalala (broadcaster) (Carmelito Masagnay Reyes, 1960–2021), Filipino comedian, radio broadcaster and TV personality
- Donna Shalala (born 1941), American politician and academic
- Shalala (EP), 2023 EP by South Korean rapper Taeyong

== See also ==
- Sha-La-La-La-La (also known as Shalala Lala), 1973 single by Danish band Walkers
