= Back to the Past =

Back to the Past may refer to:

- Back to the Past (film), a 2025 Hong Kong film
- "Back to the Past", episode 9 of SpongeBob SquarePants season 7
- "Back to the Past", song by Jay Chou from the 2002 album The Eight Dimensions
- "Back to the Past", song by Taeyong from the 2023 EP Shalala
