= Tiffany Red =

American R&B singer-songwriter

- Born: Tiffany Lauren Fred; December 24, 1986 (age 39); Madrid, Spain
- Occupation: Singer-Songwriter-Activist
- Years active: 2007–present
- Musical career
- Origin: Sicklerville, New Jersey, U.S.
- Genres: R&B; Pop; K-pop
- Instrument: Vocals
- Website: www.iamtiffanyred.com www.the100percenters.com

Tiffany Red (born December 24, 1986) is an American singer-songwriter-activist from Sicklerville, New Jersey. She has written songs for Zendaya, Jason Derulo, Cassie and many other artists. Red garnered her first Grammy Award in 2009 for her contributions to Jennifer Hudson's self-titled album, winning Best R&B Album. Red was again nominated in 2014 for her contributions to Fantasia's album Side Effects of You for Best Urban Contemporary Album. She has also independently released seven projects of her own.

In June 2020, Red's social media outcry over the under-compensation for her contribution to the K-pop hit "Boss" by NCT sparked a movement. Her activism led to the establishment of The 100 Percenters, a non-profit organization advocating for music creatives, especially those from BIPOC and marginalized communities. Her vocal advocacy garnered attention from notable media outlets like Billboard, Variety, Forbes, and Rolling Stone. She also received support from entities like Sony Music Publishing and the YouTube Black Voices Fund.

== Songwriting Discography ==
Year	Song	Artist	Album
2008	"Invisible"	Jennifer Hudson	Jennifer Hudson
2011	"Kleptomaniac"	Joe Jonas	Fastlife
2011	"Pick Up The Pieces"	Jason Derulo	Future History
2013	"Replay"	Zendaya	Zendaya
2013	"Scared"	Zendaya	Zendaya
2013	"Love You Forever"	Zendaya	Zendaya
2013	"Supernatural Love"	Fantasia	Side Effects of You
2015	"King"	Tamar Braxton	Calling All Lovers
2015	"I Love You"	Tamar Braxton	Calling All Lovers
2015	"Just Being Honest"	Sevyn Streeter	Shoulda Been There, Pt. 1
2015	"Wait For It"	Samantha Jade	Nine
2016	"Lipstick"	Shinee	1 of 1
2016	"Joint (No Sleep)"	Cassie	Honey 3: Dare to Dance
2017	"Good Woman"	La'Porsha Renae	Already All Ready
2018	"Boss"	NCT	NCT 2018 Empathy
2018	"Go"	NCT	NCT 2018 Empathy
2018	"Happy For Me"	Bridget Kelly	Reality Bites
2018	"Sedated"	Bridget Kelly	Reality Bites
2019	"Don't Let Go"	Cassie	Free Fridays
2019	"Teach Me"	Cassie	Free Fridays
2019	"Simple Things"	Cassie	Free Fridays
2025	"Somethin (Bout U)"	Keri Hilson	We Need to Talk: Love
2025	"Scream"	Keri Hilson	We Need to Talk: Love
2025	"Naked"	Keri Hilson	We Need to Talk: Love

== TV Songwriting Discography ==
Year	Show	Song
2018	Star	"For Sure"
2018	Star	"All I Need"
2018	Star	"All Love"
2018	Star	"Believe In Me"
2018	Empire	"Ibizia"
2020	Empire	"Do It Right"
2020	Empire	"Priceless"
2020	Empire	"How Could You"
2020	Empire	"Me & You"

== Awards ==
Award	Year	Category	Work	Result
Grammy Awards	2009	Best R&B Album	Jennifer Hudson (as a songwriter)	Won
Grammy Awards	2014	Best Urban Contemporary Album	Side Effects of You (as a songwriter)	Nominated
