= Tap (EP) =

EP by Taeyong
- Released: February 26, 2024
- Genre: R&B; hip hop; rock
- Length: 19:24
- Language: Korean; English
- Label: SM; Kakao
- Producer: Royal Dive; Squar; Zayson

Taeyong chronology
Shalala (2023)	Tap (2024)

Singles from Tap
- 1. "Tap" Released: February 26, 2024

Tap is the second extended play by South Korean rapper Taeyong. It was released on February 26, 2024, by SM Entertainment through Kakao Entertainment.

== Background and release ==
Through SM Entertainment's 3Q23 earning release, it was revealed that Taeyong would be releasing an EP in early 2024. SM Entertainment declared on January 25, 2024, that Taeyong would release his second EP on February 26. The EP's title, Tap, was revealed on February 8.

== Track listing ==
All lyrics are written by Taeyong.

Tap track listing
No.	Title	Music	Arrangement	Length
1.	"Tap"	Royal Dive; Taeyong	Royal Dive	2:37
2.	"Moon Tour"	Squar; Taeyong	Squar	3:11
3.	"Run Away"	Squar; Taeyong	Squar	2:58
4.	"Ape"	Squar; Taeyong	Squar	3:13
5.	"Ups & Downs" (나에게 했던 것과 같이)	Squar; Taeyong	Squar	3:18
6.	"404 Loading"	Zayson; Taeyong	Zayson	4:04
Total length:				19:24

== Charts ==
=== Weekly charts ===
Weekly chart performance for Tap
Chart (2024)	Peak position
Japanese Albums (Oricon)	8
Japanese Combined Albums (Oricon)	8
Japanese Hot Albums (Billboard Japan)	5
South Korean Albums (Circle)	3
UK Album Downloads (OCC)	87

=== Monthly charts ===
Monthly chart performance for Tap
Chart (2024)	Position
Japanese Albums (Oricon)	22
South Korean Albums (Circle)	7

=== Year-end charts ===
Year-end chart performance for Tap
Chart (2024)	Position
South Korean Albums (Circle)	83

== Certifications ==
Certifications for Tap
Region	Certification	Certified units/sales
South Korea (KMCA)	Platinum	250,000^{^}
^{^} Shipments figures based on certification alone.

== Release history ==
Release history and formats for Tap
Region	Date	Format	Label	Ref.
Various	February 26, 2024	CD; digital download; streaming	SM; Kakao	
