= Shalala (EP) =

- Digital cover

EP by Taeyong
- Released: June 5, 2023
- Studio: SM Studios
- Genre: Hip-hop
- Length: 23:28
- Languages: Korean; English
- Labels: SM; Kakao
- Producers: Royal Dive; Squar; Zayson; $UN; Saimon; Devine Channel; Park Young-kwang; Denzel World Peace

Taeyong chronology
Shalala (2023)	Tap (2024)

Singles from Shalala
- 1. "Shalala" Released: June 5, 2023

Shalala is the debut extended play (EP) by South Korean rapper Taeyong. It was released on June 5, 2023, by SM Entertainment through Kakao Entertainment alongside the music video for its lead single of the same name. The EP contains seven tracks all co-written by Taeyong with several other songwriters, including long-time collaborators Royal Dive, Squar and Zayson. The EP was commercially successful, selling over 380,000 copies in its first week, and has sold over 500,000 copies.

== Background and release ==
South Korean rapper Taeyong became known as a member of the K-pop boy group NCT after debuting with the group under SM Entertainment in 2016. He wrote numerous songs for the group and its sub-units, including "The 7th Sense" (2016), "Cherry Bomb" (2017), and "Sticker" (2021), and later joined SM Entertainment's supergroup SuperM. As a soloist, he collaborated with several artists and released some of his songs, including "Long Flight", through the SM Station project while still being active in NCT. In 2021, he started independently releasing self-composed tracks on SoundCloud.

On May 15, 2023, SM Entertainment that Taeyong would release his first extended play (EP), Shalala, containing seven tracks including the lead single of the same name.

== Critical reception ==
Professional ratings
Review scores
Source	Rating
NME	4/5 stars

Carmen Chin of NME gave Shalala four out of five stars, saying it is an album that "demonstrates [Taeyong's] immense potential as an artist unafraid to forge personal connections with his audience, setting an indelible standard for future K-pop soloists." Chin noted that Shalala retains NCT's signature sound, while delving deeper in Taeyong's personal life presented through his "down-to-earth" songwriting. Chin also highlighted Taeyong's performance on the "emotional" half of the album, commenting that that's where the singer "really shines".

== Commercial performance ==
Shalala surpassed 500,000 pre-orders a day before the release. As of July 6, the EP has sold more than 503,952 copies.

== Promotion ==
=== Single ===
The music video for the hip hop lead single, "Shalala", was released on June 5, 2023. It shows Taeyong playing the role of a hacker who is capable of modifying reality and traveling among multiverses. Han Seong-hyun of IZM gave the single two out of five stars, criticizing the chorus among other elements.

=== Live performances ===
The same day of release, Taeyong presented the EP at his showcase, titled Code: Stage, where he performed several tracks, including the lead single. The show was broadcast live through NCT's YouTube and TikTok channels.

== Track listing ==
Shalala track listing
No.	Title	Lyrics	Music	Arrangement	Length
1.	"Shalala" (샤랄라)	Chamane; Omega Sapien; Taeyong	Chamane; Devine Channel; Omega Sapien; Park Young-kwang; Taeyong; Denzelworldpeace	Devine Channel; Park Young-kwang; Denzelworldpeace	3:21
2.	"Gwando" (관둬)	Taeyong	Royal Dive; Saimon; Taeyong	Royal Dive; Saimon	3:37
3.	"Move Mood Mode" (featuring Wendy)	Taeyong	Squar; Taeyong	Squar	2:54
4.	"Virtual Insanity"	Taeyong	Royal Dive; Taeyong	Royal Dive	2:59
5.	"Ruby"	Taeyong	$un; Saimon; Taeyong	$un; Saimon	3:18
6.	"404 File Not Found"	Taeyong	Zayson; Taeyong	Zayson	4:04
7.	"Back to the Past"	Taeyong	Royal Dive; Taeyong	Royal Dive	3:15
Total length:					23:28

== Charts ==
=== Weekly charts ===
Weekly chart performance for Shalala
Chart (2023)	Peak position
Japanese Albums (Oricon)	10
Japanese Combined Albums (Oricon)	10
Japanese Hot Albums (Billboard Japan)	7
South Korean Albums (Circle)	2

=== Monthly charts ===
Monthly chart performance for Shalala
Chart (2023)	Position
Japanese Albums (Oricon)	19
South Korean Albums (Circle)	5

=== Year-end charts ===
Year-end chart performance for Shalala
Chart (2023)	Position
South Korean Albums (Circle)	55

== Certifications ==
Certifications for Shalala
Region	Certification	Certified units/sales
South Korea (KMCA)	Platinum	250,000^{^}
^{^} Shipments figures based on certification alone.

== Release history ==
Release history and formats for Shalala
Region	Date	Format	Label	Ref.
Various	June 5, 2023	Digital download; streaming; CD	SM; Kakao Entertainment	
