= Touch (NCT 127 song) =

Single by South Korean boyband by NCT 127

- Japanese single cover

Single by NCT 127

from the album NCT 2018 Empathy and Awaken
- Language: Korean; Japanese
- Released: March 13, 2018
- Recorded: 2017–2018
- Studio: SM Blue Ocean (Seoul); SM LVYIN Studio (Seoul); Yireh Studio (Seoul)
- Genre: Pop
- Length: 3:09
- Label: SM; iRiver; Avex Trax (Japanese release)
- Composers: LDN Noise; Deez; Adrian McKinnon
- Lyricists: Jo Yoon-kyung, Kim Min-ji, Shin Jin-hye (Korean); Meg.Me (Japanese)
- Producers: LDN Noise; Deez

NCT 127 singles chronology
"Cherry Bomb" (2017)	"Touch" (2018)	"Regular" (2018)

NCT singles chronology
"Go" (2018)	"Touch" (2018)	"Yestoday" (2018)

Music video
- "Touch" on YouTube

"Touch" is a song recorded by the South Korean, Seoul-based unit NCT 127 for their parental unlimited boy band NCT's first studio album NCT 2018 Empathy (2018). Co-produced by production team LDN Noise, Deez and Adrian McKinnon with lyrics from Jo Yoon-kyung, Kim Min-ji and Shin Jin-hye, the '90s-imbued tropical house track was released digitally on March 13, 2018, as the fourth single from Empathy by SM Entertainment with iRIVER Inc as the distributor. An accompanying music video was premiered a day prior to both the single and the album's scheduled digital release. The song was later re-recorded and released as the first single from the unit's first Japanese studio album Awaken (2019) on September 16, 2018 by Avex Trax.

Following its initial release, "Touch" received positive reviews from music critics for its "bright, poppy" nature that does not usually present through the unit's choreography. The song also attained moderate commercial success, becoming the second highest entry from Empathy on the Billboard K-Pop Hot 100, while being the unit's first single to narrowly miss the top ten on Billboard's World Digital Song chart, peaking at number eleven only.

== Background and release ==
Following the group's promotion activity for their third extended play since June 2017, all nine members were eventually revealed as part of NCT 2018, a singular-year project involving all current members of NCT during mid-January by their native label. SM Entertainment then confirmed the unit's involvement for their parental group's first major release on February 6, with a music video to precede the album release. It was eventually released as the fourth single overall for Empathy on March 13, one day prior to its digital release. The song was technically the unit's first original release in nine months, and their first for a grouped NCT release. The song was then released as a single in the Japanese market on September 16, 2018, becoming the first single for their then-unknown upcoming Japanese studio album a year later.

== Composition ==
According to Billboard's Tamar Herman, "Touch" is a '90s-imbued pop track that incorporates funky instrumentals, sleek synths and a brassy beat. The song was written by Cho Yoon-kyung, Jam Factory and Shin Jin-hye, and produced by LDN Noise, Deez, and Adrian McKinnon.

== Chart performance ==
"Touch" entered at number 69 on Billboard's K-pop Hot 100, on the week ending April 1, 2018. A week later, the song peaked at number 54. The song failed to enter Gaon's main single chart, but entered the component Download chart at number 31.

== Credits and personnel ==
Credits adapted from album's liner notes.

=== Studio ===
- SM Blue Ocean Studio – recording
- SM LVYIN Studio – recording
- Yireh Studio – recording
- SM Big Shot Studio – digital editing
- SM Yellow Tail Studio – mixing
- 821 Sound Mastering – mastering

=== Personnel ===
- SM Entertainment – executive producer
- Lee Soo-man – producer
- Yoo Young-jin – music and sound supervisor
- NCT 127 – vocals
- Kim Min-ji – Korean lyrics
- Shin Jin-hye – Korean lyrics
- Jo Yoon-kyung – Korean lyrics
- Meg.Me – Japanese lyrics
- Andrew Choi – background vocals
- LDN Noise – producer, composition, arrangement
- Deez – producer, composition, arrangement, vocal directing
- Adrian McKinnon – composition, background vocals
- Kim Cheol-sun – recording
- Lee Ji-hong – recording
- Shin Dae-sub – recording
- Lee Min-kyu – digital editing
- Gu Jong-pil – mixing
- Kwon Nam-woo – mastering

== Charts ==
Chart performance for "Touch"
Chart (2018)	Peak position
South Korea (K-pop Hot 100)	54
US World Digital Songs (Billboard)	11
