= Chain (NCT 127 EP) =

- Digital cover

EP by NCT 127
- Released: May 23, 2018
- Recorded: 2016–2018
- Studios: SM Studios, Seoul, South Korea
- Genres: J-pop; hip-hop; R&B; electropop
- Length: 18:14
- Language: Japanese
- Label: Avex Trax
- Producers: Lee Soo-man (exec.); Caesar & Loui; Harvey Mason Jr.; Kenzie; Mike Dakey; Andrew Choi; Deez; MZMC; Dewain Whitmore; Patrick "J Que" Smith; 250; Albin Nordqvist; Kevin Randolph; Kanata Okajima; Mitchell Owens

NCT 127 chronology
Cherry Bomb (2017)	Chain (2018)	Regular-Irregular (2018)

NCT chronology
NCT 2018 Empathy (2018)	Chain (2018)	We Go Up (2018)

Singles from Chain
- 1. "Limitless (Japanese Ver.)" Released: November 4, 2017; 2. "Chain" Released: May 8, 2018

Chain is the debut Japanese extended play (fourth overall) by South Korean boy band NCT 127, the multi-national and second sub-unit of NCT. The five-track extended play was released on May 23, 2018, by their Japanese record label Avex Trax. With SM Entertainment's founder Lee Soo-man serving as the executive producer, the record featured composition from production team Caesar & Loui, Kanata Okajima, 250, Albin Nordqvist, Kenzie, Mike Daley, MZMC, Harvey Mason Jr., J Que, Kevin Randolph, Mitchell Owens, Deez, Tay Jasper, Andrew Choi, MEG.ME and others. It was preceded by the Japanese version of "Limitless" as the first single on November 4, 2017, followed by the eponymous second single on May 8, 2018. To further promote the release, the group had their first showcase tour prior to its release.

Upon its release, Chain achieved commercial success for the group. It debuted at number two of the Oricon Weekly Albums chart with 44,832 copies sold on its first week of release, eventually went on to achieve a total of 49,289 copies in Japan. In addition, the extended play also debuted at number eight on the Billboard World Albums Chart, earning the group's fourth top-ten entry. It was NCT 127's last album to feature the nine-original member line-up, before the addition of member Jungwoo later in September 2018.

== Background and release ==
In late 2017, SM Entertainment announced that NCT 127 would be one of their two idol groups to debut and hold accompanying showcase tour in Japan during spring of 2018, having signed with Japanese label Avex Trax for further marketing and promotion along with fellow labelmate Red Velvet. The group then revealed the extended play's title to be Chain on March 31, 2018, as well as the album covers and tracklist. It was released in a total of thirteen editions: ten CDs (nine being limited edition individual covers and a normal pressing CD), two CD+DVDs (one limited and one normal edition), and a limited edition cassette tape.

The title track "Chain" later received a Korean version which is included in the repackaged version of the group's first album, Regular-Irregular several months later.

The song 'Come Back' later received a Korean and Chinese version. The Korean version was featured in NCT 127's first album Regular-Irregular. The Chinese version was featured twice by WayV; first in the debut digital EP: The Vision and then in their first mini album: Take Off.

== Track listing ==
Credits adapted from Naver.

Chain
No.	Title	Lyrics	Music	Arrangement	Length
1.	"Dreaming"	Junji Ishiwatari	Kanata Okajima; Daniel Caesar (Caesar & Loui); Ludwig Lindell (Caesar & Loui)	Caesar & Loui (The Kennel)	3:17
2.	"Chain"	MEG.ME	Kim Dong-hyun; 250; Albin Nordqvist	250	3:42
3.	"Limitless" (Japanese version)	Kenzie	Kenzie; Harvey Mason Jr.; Patrick "J. Que" Smith; Kevin Randolph; Dewain Whitmore; Andrew Hey; Britt Burton	Kenzie	4:07
4.	"Come Back"	Ryu Da-som; Bong Eun-young	Mike Daley; Mitchell Owens; Deez; Michael Jiminez; Jeremy "Tay" Jasper; MZMC	Deez; Jeremy "Tay" Jasper	3:25
5.	"100"	Akira (Palm Drive)	Andrew Choi; Yunsu (SOULTRiii)	Andrew Choi	3:42
Total length:					18:14

Note: The cassette edition of the EP consists of tracks 1–3 on Side A and tracks 4–5 on Side B.

== Charts ==
Chart (2018)	Peak position
Japanese Albums (Oricon)	2
Japan Hot Albums (Billboard Japan)	3
US World Albums (Billboard)	8
