= Without You (NCT U song) =

2016 song by NCT U

Single by NCT U

from the album NCT 2018 Empathy
- Released: April 10, 2016
- Recorded: 2016
- Studio: SM Booming System
- Genre: EDM; rock
- Length: 6:52
- Label: SM
- Composer(s): Matt Schwartz; Ki Fitzgerald; John Reid; Yoo Young-jin
- Lyricist(s): Yoo Young-jin (Korean); Kinyo Lim (Chinese)
- Producer(s): Yoo Young-jin

NCT U singles chronology
"The 7th Sense" (2016)	"Without You" (2016)	"Timeless" (2018)

NCT singles chronology
"The 7th Sense" (2016)	"Without You" (2016)	"Fire Truck" (2016)

Music video
- "Without You" on YouTube

"Without You" is the second single of South Korean boy group NCT U, the first unit of NCT. It was released digitally on April 10, 2016 by SM Entertainment, just a day after the group's debut single "The 7th Sense". Musically, "Without You" was described as an EDM rock genre song with intense electric guitar sounds.

== Background and release ==
At midnight of August 10, "Without You" sung by NCT U's Taeil, Jaehyun, and Doyoung was released through various sites. The single includes a Chinese version of the song as a bonus track which additionally features vocals from then-SMROOKIES member Kun.

== Composition ==
The lyrics of this song tell us about the happiness of understanding each other and living together in an era of intense competition.

== Music video ==
SM Rookies (now-NCT member) Winwin appeared.

== Track listing ==
No.	Title	Lyrics	Music	Arrangement	Length
1.	"Without You"	Yoo Young-jin	Matt Schwartz, Ki Fitzgerald, John Reid, Yoo Young-jin	Yoo Young-jin	3:25
2.	"Without You (Chinese Version)"	Kinyo Lim	Matt Schwartz, Ki Fitzgerald, John Reid, Yoo Young-jin	Yoo Young-jin	3:25
Total length:					6:52

== Charts ==
Chart (2016)	Peak position
South Korea (Gaon)	126
US World Digital Songs (Billboard)	3

== Credits and personnel ==
Credits adapted from album's liner notes.

=== Studio ===
- SM Booming System – recording, mixing, digital editing, additional vocal editing
- Sonic Korea – mastering

=== Personnel ===
- SM Entertainment – executive producer
- Lee Soo-man – producer
- Lee Sung-soo – production director
- Nam So-young – executive supervisor
- Kim Young-min – executive supervisor
- NCT U – vocals, background vocals
- Kinyo Lim – Chinese lyrics
- Yoo Young-jin – producer, Korean lyrics, composition, arrangement, vocal directing, background vocals, recording, mixing, digital editing, additional vocal editing, music and sound supervisor
- Matt Schwartz – composition
- Ki Fitzgerald – composition
- John Reid – composition
- Jeon Hoon – mastering
