= Boss (NCT U song) =

Single by NCT U

from the album NCT 2018 Empathy
- Released: February 18, 2018
- Recorded: 2018
- Studio: SM Booming System; Doobdoob Studio; SM Blue Cup Studio
- Genre: K-pop; hip hop
- Length: 3:34
- Label: SM
- Composers: Mike Daley; Mitchell Owens; Tiffany Fred; Patrick “J Que” Smith; Yoo Young-jin
- Lyricists: Wutan; Taeyong; Mark; Yoo Young-jin
- Producers: Mike Daley; Yoo Young-jin

NCT U singles chronology
"Timeless" (2018)	"Boss" (2018)	"Baby Don't Stop" (2018)

NCT singles chronology
"Timeless" (2018)	"BOSS" (2018)	"Baby Don't Stop" (2018)

Music video
- "Boss" on YouTube

"Boss" is a song recorded by South Korean boy group NCT U, the first unit of NCT under the management of SM Entertainment, serving as the lead single of NCT's debut studio album NCT 2018 Empathy. Musically, "Boss" was described as a dynamic, electro-hip-hop track with a paunchy, chanting chorus of the bass-heavy dance that ends with a heavy synth.

== Music video ==
The music video for "Boss" was the first of the two music videos that was filmed in Kyiv, Ukraine directed by South Korean director Oui Kim, the other being the coupling NCT U single "Baby Don't Stop". The filming locations were the Ukrainian house, the abandoned bus park Number 7, and the Vernadsky National Library of Ukraine.

== Accolades ==
Year-end lists
Critic/Publication	List	Rank	Ref.
BuzzFeed	30 Songs That Helped Define K-Pop In 2018	6	
SBS PopAsia	Most visually captivating K-pop music videos of 2018 (so far)	7	

== Credits and personnel ==
Credits adapted from album's liner notes.

=== Studio ===
- SM Booming System – recording
- SM Blue Cup Studio – recording, mixing
- Doobdoob Studio – recording
- SM LVYIN Studio – digital editing
- Sterling Sound – mastering

=== Personnel ===
- SM Entertainment – executive producer
- Lee Soo-man – producer
- NCT U – vocals
  - Taeyong – lyrics, background vocals
  - Mark – lyrics
- Yoo Young-jin – producer, lyrics, composition, arrangement, vocal directing, background vocals, recording, music and sound supervisor
- Mike Daley – producer, composition, arrangement
- Mitchell Owens – composition
- Patrick "J. Que" Smith – composition
- Tiffany Fred – composition
- Wutan – lyrics, vocal directing
- Lee Joo-hyung – vocal directing, Pro Tools operating
- Byun Jang-moon – background vocals
- Jung Eui-seok – recording, mixing
- Ahn Chang-gyu – recording
- Lee Ji-hong – digital editing
- Randy Merrill – mastering

== Charts ==
Chart (2018)	Peak position
South Korea (Gaon)	97
South Korea (K-pop Hot 100)	80
US World Digital Songs (Billboard)	3
