= Baby Don't Stop =

2018 song by NCT U

- Special Thai Version single cover

Single by NCT U

from the album NCT 2018 Empathy
- Released: February 27, 2018
- Recorded: 2018
- Studio: SM LVYIN (Seoul); SM Yellow Tail (Seoul)
- Genre: K-pop; hip hop
- Length: 3:09
- Label: SM
- Composer(s): Matt Schwartz; Paul Harris; Little Nikki; Yoo Young-jin; Ryan S. Jhun
- Lyricist(s): Danke (Lalala Studio); Juno (Joombas); Taeyong
- Producer(s): Yoo Young-jin; Ryan S. Jhun

NCT U singles chronology
"BOSS" (2018)	"Baby Don't Stop" (2018)	"Yestoday" (2018)

NCT singles chronology
"BOSS" (2018)	"Baby Don't Stop" (2018)	"GO" (2018)

Music video
- "Baby Don't Stop" on YouTube

"Baby Don't Stop" is a song recorded by South Korean boy group NCT U, the first unit of NCT under the management of SM Entertainment, serving as the second single of NCT's debut studio album NCT 2018 Empathy. The song is a duet sung by NCT members Ten and Taeyong. Musically, "Baby Don't Stop" was described as a lush art house tune featuring a powerful, stark bass beat laid over sultry synths, dramatic raps, and passionate whispers.

== Track listing ==
- NCT 2018 EMPATHY
1. "Baby Don't Stop" – 3:03
- Baby Don't Stop (Special Thai Version)
1. "Baby Don't Stop (Special Thai Version)" – 3:03
2. "Baby Don't Stop (Instrumental)" – 3:03

== Accolades ==
Year-end lists
Critic/Publication	List	Rank	Ref.
Billboard	The 20 Best K-pop Songs of 2018: Critics' Picks	19	
Dazed Digital	The 20 best K-pop songs of 2018	7	

== Charts ==
Chart (2018)	Peak position
US World Digital Songs (Billboard)	3

== Credits and personnel ==
Credits adapted from album's liner notes.

=== Studio ===
- SM Yellow Tail Studio – recording
- SM LVYIN Studio – recording
- SM Big Shot Studio – digital editing
- SM Concert Hall Studio – mixing
- Sterling Sound – mastering

=== Personnel ===
- SM Entertainment – executive producer
- Lee Soo-man – producer
- NCT U – vocals
  - Taeyong – lyrics
- Juno (Joombas) – lyrics
- Danke (Lalala Studio) – lyrics
- Yoo Young-jin – producer, composition, arrangement, music and sound supervisor
- Maxx Song – vocal directing, Pro Tools operating, digital editing
- Ju Chan-yang – background vocals
- Ryan S. Jhun – producer, composition, arrangement
- Matt Schwartz – composition, arrangement
- Paul Harris – composition, arrangement
- Little Nikki – composition
- Gu Jong-pil – recording
- Lee Ji-hong – recording
- Lee Min-kyu – digital editing
- Nam Koong-jin – mixing
- Randy Merrill – mastering
