= Double Dragon (music producer) =

Double Dragon is a Hip-Hop/R&B music production duo consisting of siblings Roy Chong and Elmo Chong also known as the "Funk Seoul Brothers".

== Biography ==
Hailing from Vancouver, Canada Double Dragon began producing music for several local artists in 2001. Not until 2005 did they finally catch a break producing music for #1 selling Canadian Hip-Hop group Swollen Members. The album Black Magic was a triumphant success winning a Juno Award for Rap Recording of the Year 2007. The Double Dragon produced & co-written song "Brothers" went on to be featured in the major motion picture "In the Mix" starring platinum R&B singer Usher Raymond.

During 2005 Double Dragon also solidified a relationship with #1 selling Korean Hip Hop group Drunken Tiger. This project signified big changes for the rapping duo as the exit of member DJ Shine, left remaining member Tiger JK to carry on the Drunken tradition. The new album "1945 Liberation" went on to be a great success for Tiger JK and the whole Drunken movement. Double Dragon produced song "Put Your Hands Up Here" was an instant club and Karaoke favorite.

In late 2005 Double Dragon found themselves in collaboration with critically acclaimed Gospel/Christian hip hop artist Da' T.R.U.T.H. Part of a Gospel Hip-Hop collective called Cross Movement, Da' T.R.U.T.H is known for his powerful lyrics, energetic music and unfailing faith. His second album entitled The Faith marked Da' T.R.U.T.H's arrival at centre stage, poised to speak to those who were ready to listen. Double Dragon produced song "Incredible Christian" became the lead single for the album, which debuted at #7 on Billboard Gospel charts. Double Dragon also produced "2 is Better", which lent an R&B feel to the album. The Faith went on to win a Stellar Award for Best Gospel Hip-Hop album of 2006.

Still focused on projects in Korea, Double Dragon began working with Yang Dong-geun (YDG) in 2006. YDG is an accomplished A-List actor, starring in major Korean motion pictures and many Korean TV dramas. Double Dragon produced 4 songs for his 3rd album. "W.I.D.G.Y", "Run", "When I Was a Teenager", and "Neighborhood". Coming off the success of his movie career the album was well received.

At the same time Double Dragon was producing a song for Korean R&B crooner Bobby Kim. The Double Dragon song "For the Moment" was produced for a popular Korean TV series called Breaks also featured in the show's soundtrack.

2007 gave way to a new project for Double Dragon with Korean Pop/Hip-Hip/R&B artist Yun Mi Rae (Tasha Reid, or T) formerly of Tashannie. Her long-awaited album came only after a drawn out battle with her former record label. Double Dragon produced song "Pay Day" was a standout Hip-Hop anthem, that Korean audiences responded to immediately.

== The future ==
Now based in New York City, Double Dragon is setting up to work with more US major label artists. 2007 will continue to showcase Double Dragon's work with artists such as Swollen Members, YDG and Drunken Tiger.
