= NCT 2018 Empathy =

- Digital cover

Studio album by NCT
- Released: March 14, 2018
- Recorded: 2016–2018
- Studios: Doobdoob (Seoul); In Grid (Seoul); SM Blue Cup (Seoul); SM Blue Ocean (Seoul); SM Booming System (Seoul); SM LVYIN (Seoul); SM Yellow Tail (Seoul); Yireh (Seoul)
- Genres: Hip hop; trap; EDM
- Length: 44:39
- Languages: Korean; English; Mandarin
- Labels: SM; IRIVER
- Producers: Lee Soo-man; Matt Schwartz; Tommy $trate; The Stereotypes; Timothy 'Bos' Bullock; Deez; Yoo Young-jin; Ryan S. Jhun; MZMC; Adrian McKinnon; Shin Hyuk; Josh Cumbee; Andrew Choi; Sara Forsberg; LDN Noise

NCT chronology
We Young (2017)	NCT 2018 Empathy (2018)	Chain (2018)

NCT studio albums chronology
NCT 2018 Empathy (2018)	NCT 2020 Resonance (2020)

Singles from NCT 2018 Empathy
- 1. "Boss" Released: February 18, 2018; 2. "Baby Don't Stop" Released: February 26, 2018; 3. "Go" Released: March 4, 2018; 4. "Touch" Released: March 13, 2018; 5. "Yestoday (Extended version)" Released: April 1, 2018; 6. "Black On Black" Released: April 18, 2018

NCT 2018 Empathy (stylized in uppercase) is the debut studio album by South Korean Boy band NCT, an unlimited group project under the management of SM Entertainment. Containing a total of fourteen tracks with twelve of which were released as singles from 2016 to 2018, the album marked the first group release with eighteen members from three different units participating at the time, while being the first release to officially introduce three new members Kun, Jungwoo and Lucas. With the group's label founder Lee Soo-man serving as the executive producer, composition and production for the album was contributed by Matt Schwartz, Tommy $trate, The Stereotypes, Timothy 'Bos' Bullock, Deez, Yoo Young-jin, Ryan S. Jhun, MZMC, Adrian McKinnon, Shin Hyuk, Josh Cumbee, Andrew Choi, Sara Forsberg, LDN Noise, and others. It was released on March 14, 2018, by SM Entertainment and iriver Inc along with the album's fourth single "Touch" by the Seoul-based unit NCT 127 and "Black on Black", the first single featuring all eighteen members of the group at that time.

Upon its release, NCT 2018 Empathy received mixed to positive reviews from music critics over its "compiled" tracklist and the overall solidity. The album also attained commercial success domestically, peaking at number two on the Gaon Album Chart and became the group's first release to receive a Platinum KMCA certification following its introduction in 2018. It also experienced international success, peaking at number five on the Billboard World Albums while becoming the first NCT release to appear on other European charts. As of 2022, the album has achieved a cumulative sales of over 636,055 physical copies.

== Background ==
Following the announcement and introduction to the group's debut earlier in January 2016 by founder Lee Soo-man, a total of three sub-units debuted subsequently in the same year. The first sub-unit was NCT U, a rotational sub-unit with different members participating accordingly to the unit's music release which, at the time, saw the first appearance from member Taeil, Taeyong, Doyoung, Ten, Jaehyun and Mark. They eventually debuted with a double digital single, containing "The 7th Sense" with the latter five members and "Without You", which were performed by members Taeil, Doyoung and Jaehyun. The label then introduced NCT 127, the Seoul-based unit with number "127" representing the longitude coordinate of South Korea's capital on July 1 with seven members for its initial line-up: Taeil, Taeyong, Yuta, Jaehyun, Winwin, Mark, and Haechan. Following the label's announcement on December 27, 2016, member Doyoung and then-SR15B member Johnny officially joined the unit, marking with the unit's sophomore extended play later in January 2017. On August 18, SM Entertainment announced that the third unit would be NCT Dream, the teen-aged unit which consists of seven members: Mark, Renjun, Jeno, Haechan, Jaemin, Chenle, and Jisung. By the end of 2016, fifteen members were introduced officially as part of the unlimited NCT brand. NCT 127 and NCT Dream then continued to promote actively throughout the following year with further releases.

In mid-January, SM Entertainment unveiled NCT 2018, a singular-year project involving all current members of NCT. Through the "NCT 2018 Yearbook #1" video on January 30, the label officially introduced new members Kun, Lucas, and Jungwoo to the current line-up of NCT. Followed by a series of online documentary videos titled NCTmentary as part of the NCT 2018 project, the group shared "NCT Yearbook #2" video via their official YouTube channel on February 5. Prior to their official introduction, member Kun was featured on the Chinese version of "Without You" in April 2016, having performed live with NCT U. The label eventually revealed that the group would release their first large-scale project as a studio album the following day, with all eighteen members participated accordingly to their sub-unit and music project for NCT U.

== Composition ==
NCT 2018 Empathy consists of fourteen tracks in total, including an instrumental intro and outro and one extended version of a new song. The album also includes five previously released songs for its latter half, namely "The 7th Sense", the Korean and Chinese versions of "Without You" and "Timeless" by NCT U, while "Dream in a Dream" is an English solo record by member Ten, which along with "Timeless" was originally part of the SM Station project. The new recording material includes "Boss", a future-bass hip-hop track with "heavy bass riffs" which is produced by Mike Daley, Mitchell Owens, Tiffany Fred, Patrick "J. Que" Smith and Yoo Young-jin. With co-writing contribution by member Taeyong and Mark, the song contains the message of how the modern society "needs true empathy" and the unit's aspiration to bring out such empathy. Seven members participated in recording the song: Taeyong, Doyoung, Winwin, Jaehyun, Jungwoo, Lucas and Mark. It is followed by "Baby Don't Stop", an electro-hop, synth-pop track co-produced again by Yoo Young-jin with contribution from producer Matt Schwartz and Ryan S. Jhun. It possesses an "impressive" minimalist sonic composition with "addictive" drum and bass riff, expressing the sensation of an immediate love. It was also co-written by member Taeyong, whom performed the track along with member Ten as NCT U. He also contributed lyrically to the third and final new NCT U record, titled "Yestoday". It was described as a "sorrowful" old-school hip-hop influenced track, with member Taeyong, Doyoung, Lucas and Mark rapping and singing about how "today will eventually become yesterday".

Other new material for the album includes the tropical-house influenced "Touch" by NCT 127. Produced by production team LDN Noise, Deez and Adrian McKinnon, the song offers a "softer side" for the nine-member unit in comparison to their signature intense hip hop style. In contrast, the teen-aged sub-unit NCT Dream also offers their "rebellious" side with the electro-hop bombast of "Go", featuring heavy hi-hats and snare lines that resembles more of a hip hop venture than the group's usual "youthful leanings" of their earlier discography. The rap-centric "Black on Black" is a "booming" electro-dance production featuring roars and "highly distorted" vocals, which credited NCT 2018 as the performers though only the rap-line members (Taeyong, Mark, Lucas) participated in the recording of the song.

== Release and promotion ==
=== Distribution ===
NCT 2018 Empathy was released on March 14, 2018, by their native label SM Entertainment. The release was done through many music portals, including MelOn (South Korea) and iTunes (internationally), with physical release provided on the same day as well. The physical release contains two different versions, namely Reality and Dream with slightly difference on the package design and different group photo booklets. The digital release also contains an extended version of the album's fifth single "Yestoday" by NCT U.

=== Singles ===
Featuring members Taeyong, Doyoung, Jaehyun, Winwin, Mark, Jungwoo and Lucas (with the latter two members being officially introduced for the first time), the NCT U-leading "Boss" was released as the album's lead single on February 18 with its music video. It was the most successful release from the album, peaking at number 97 on the Gaon Digital Chart, number 80 on the Billboard K-Pop Hot 100 and number three on the Billboard World Digital Songs chart. It was proceeded by the music video for "Baby Don't Stop", another NCT U single with member Taeyong and Ten on February 26, with both music videos sharing the same filming location at the Vernadsky National Library of Ukraine in Kyiv, Ukraine. The single peaked at number two on the Billboard World Digital Songs chart, tying with their 2016's release "The 7th Sense" as the unit's highest peak on the chart. The third single "Go" by NCT Dream was released on March 4 to moderate success, peaking at number eighteen on the Billboard World Digital Songs and number twenty-five on the Billboard K-Pop Hot 100, becoming the highest-charting release of NCT 2018 Empathy on the latter chart.

In conjunction with the album release on March 13, the NCT 127-leading "Touch" was released as the fourth single on March 13. It also attained moderate success, peaking at number fifty-four on the Billboard K-Pop Hot 100 and number eleven on the World Digital Songs chart. Two further singles were released later, including the old school hip-hop influenced "Yestoday" on April 1 with participation from member Taeyong, Doyoung, Mark and Lucas as the fifth single, and "Black on Black", the performance-assisted single by the whole group as the sixth and final single on April 18. The latter became the only single to feature all eighteen members, and subsequently the first to officially introduce Chinese member Kun. Neither of these singles charted in any native, nor the World Digital Songs component chart.

=== Live performances ===
Promotion for the album started with NCT U's "Boss" first television performance at M Countdown on February 22, followed by performances on Show Champion, Show! Music Core and Inkigayo. Under the same unit, member Taeyong continued to promote with member Ten for "Baby Don't Stop" with live performances on M Countdown, Music Bank, Show! Music Core and Inkigayo starting from March 1. NCT Dream then continued the pre-release promotion activities with "Go" from March 8 and "Touch" by NCT 127 starting from March 15. "Touch" later won the unit their first music show trophy at The Show on March 29, 2018, being the only release from the album to do so.

== Commercial performance ==
Prior to the album's release, NCT 2018 Empathy already achieved 203,000 pre-orders, eventually topped several iTunes country charts upon its release. The album then entered and peaked at number two on the Gaon Album Chart on the week of March 17, 2018, being held off the top position by Got7's Eyes on You. It was the third best-selling album on the March 2018 issue of the monthly album chart, and subsequently the thirteen best-selling album on the year-end album chart, having sold a total of 330,335 physical copies. It was the first album by NCT to receive a Platinum certificate by KMCA since its introduction in the same year, which granted a Platinum certificate for every album release that achieved a cumulative sales of over 250,000 copies.

== Track listing ==
Adapted from Naver

NCT 2018 Empathy
No.	Title	Lyrics	Music	Arrangement	Length
1.	"Intro: Neo Got My Back" (NCT U)	Tommy $trate	Dakshood; Tommy $trate	Dakshood; Rosangyoon	1:57
2.	"Boss" (NCT U) (sung by Taeyong, Doyoung, Jaehyun, Winwin, Jungwoo, Lucas and Mark)	Wutan; Yoo Young-jin; Taeyong; Mark	Mike Daley; Mitchell Owens; Tiffany Fred; Patrick J. Que Smith; Yoo Young-jin	Yoo Young-jin; Mike Daley	3:30
3.	"Baby Don't Stop" (NCT U) (sung by Taeyong and Ten)	Danke (lalala Studio); Juno (Joombas); Taeyong	Matt Schwartz; Paul Harris; Little Nikki; Yoo Young-jin; Ryan S. Jhun	Matt Schwartz; Paul Harris; Yoo Young-jin; Ryan S. Jhun	3:03
4.	"Go" (NCT Dream)	Hwang Yoo-bin; Ji Ye-won (Joombas); Mark	The Stereotypes; Tiffany Fred; Sophiya Pae (Feeline Music); Distract (Feeline Music); Yoo Young-jin	The Stereotypes	3:27
5.	"Touch" (NCT 127)	Jo Yoon-kyung; Kim Min-ji; Shin Jin-hye	LDN Noise; Deez; Adrian McKinnon	LDN Noise; Deez	3:09
6.	"Yestoday" (NCT U) (sung by Taeyong, Doyoung, Lucas and Mark)	Jung Joo-hee; Taeyong; Mark; Steven Lee; Cho Jin-joo	Hyuk Shin (Joombas); RE:ONE (Joombas); Delly Boi (Joombas); Jarah Lafayette Gibson; Steven Lee	Beat&Keys (Joombas)	3:16
7.	"Black on Black" (NCT 2018) (sung by Taeyong, Lucas, Yuta, Jeno and Mark)	MINOS; Taeyong; Mark; Deez	Afshin Salmani (Nonfiction); Josh Cumbee (Nonfiction)	Nonfiction; Deez	3:17
8.	"Timeless" (Korean: 텐데...; RR: Tende...; lit. 'Would') (NCT U) (sung by Taeil, Doyoung and Jaehyun)	Jeon Gan-di	Andrew Choi; Joseph "220" Park (Iconic Sounds)	Kim Yong-shin (Iconic Sounds); Joseph "220" Park (Iconic Sounds)	4:10
9.	"The 7th Sense" (Korean: 일곱 번째 감각; RR: Ilgop beonjjae gamgak) (NCT U) (Sung by Taeyong, Mark, Jaehyun, Doyoung and Ten)	Jeon Ji-eun (January 8th (lalala Studio)); Hwang Seon-jeong (January 8th (lalala Studio)); Kim Jeong-mi (January 8th (lalala Studio)); Kim Dong-hyun; Cho Jin-joo; Taeyong; Mark	Timothy "BOS" Bullock; Jeremy "Tay" Jasper; Adrian McKinnon; Sara Forsberg; Michael Jiminez; Leven Kali; MZMC	Jeremy "Tay" Jasper; Timothy "BOS" Bullock	3:34
10.	"Without You" (NCT U) (sung by Taeil, Doyoung and Jaehyun)	Yoo Young-jin	Matt Schwartz; Ki Fitzgerald; John Reid; Yoo Young-jin	Yoo Young-jin	3:25
11.	"Without You" (Chinese version) (NCT U) (sung by Kun, Taeil, Doyoung, and Jaehyun)	Lin Xinye	Matt Schwartz; Ki Fitzgerald; John Reid; Yoo Young-jin	Yoo Young-jin	3:25
12.	"Dream in a Dream" (Korean: 몽중몽; Hanja: 梦中梦; RR: Mongjungmong) (sung by Ten)	Stephen Carl	Stephen Carl; Dillon Pace; Brian Lee	Dillon Pace	3:35
13.	"Outro: Vision"	Yoo Young-jin	Yoo Young-jin	Yoo Young-jin	0:57
14.	"Yestoday" (Extended version) (NCT U) (Bonus Track)	Jung Joo-hee; Taeyong; Mark; Steven Lee; Cho Jin-joo	Hyuk Shin (Joombas); RE:ONE (Joombas); Delly Boi (Joombas); Jarah Lafayette Gibson; Steven Lee	Beat&Keys (Joombas)	3:47
Total length:					44:39

Notes

Intro & Outro Songs

- "Intro: Neo Got My Back" features vocals from Taeyong, Johnny, and music producer Tommy $trate
- "Outro: Vision" features vocals from Yoo Young Jin

== Credits ==
- NCT (vocals, background vocals)
  - Taeil – vocals, background vocals (tracks 5, 7, 8, 10, 11)
  - Johnny – vocals (tracks 1, 5, 7)
  - Taeyong – vocals, background vocals, songwriting (tracks 1, 2, 3, 5, 6, 7, 9)
  - Yuta – vocals (tracks 5, 7)
  - Kun – vocals (tracks 7, 11)
  - Doyoung – vocals, background vocals (tracks 2, 5, 6, 7, 8, 9, 10, 11)
  - Ten – vocals (tracks 3, 7, 9, 12)
  - Jaehyun – vocals, background vocals (tracks 2, 5, 7, 8, 9, 10, 11)
  - Winwin – vocals (tracks 2, 5, 7)
  - Jungwoo – vocals, background vocals (tracks 2, 7)
  - Lucas – vocals (tracks 2, 6, 7)
  - Mark – vocals, background vocals, songwriting (tracks 2, 4, 5, 6, 7, 9)
  - Renjun – vocals, background vocals (tracks 4, 7)
  - Jeno – vocals (tracks 4, 7)
  - Haechan – vocals, background vocals (tracks 4, 5, 7)
  - Jaemin – vocals (tracks 4, 7)
  - Chenle – vocals, background vocals (tracks 4, 7)
  - Jisung – vocals (tracks 4, 7)
- Yoo Young-jin – songwriting, background vocals, music production (tracks 2, 3, 10, 11, 13), vocals (track 13)
- Lee Soo-man – executive production

== Charts ==
=== Weekly charts ===
Chart (2018)	Peak position
Dutch Albums (MegaCharts)	190
French Download Albums (SNEP)	76
Japanese Albums (Oricon)	10
Japanese Hot Albums (Billboard)	16
South Korean Albums (Gaon)	2
UK Download Albums (OCC)	68
US Top Heatseekers (Billboard)	9
US Independent Albums (Billboard)	29
US World Albums (Billboard)	5

=== Year-end charts ===
Chart (2018)	Position
South Korean Albums (Gaon)	13
Chart (2019)	Position
South Korean Albums (Gaon)	93
Chart (2021)	Position
South Korean Albums (Gaon)	55

== Sales ==
Region	Sales
Japan (Oricon)	13,554
South Korea (Gaon)	636,055
United States (Billboard)	1,000

== Certifications ==
Region	Certification	Certified units/sales
South Korea (KMCA)	2× Platinum	500,000^{^}
^{^} Shipments figures based on certification alone.

== Accolades ==
=== Music program awards ===
Song	Program	Date
"Touch"	The Show (SBS MTV)	March 27, 2018

=== Listicles ===
Year-end lists
Critic/Publication	List	Rank	Ref.
Idolator	The 10 Best K-Pop Albums Of 2018	10	
Refinery29	The 12 Best K-Pop Albums of 2018	9	
Rolling Stone India	10 Best K-pop Albums of 2018	9	

== Release history ==
Region	Date	Format	Label
South Korea	March 14, 2018	CD; digital download; streaming	S.M. Entertainment; iriver
Various	March 14, 2018	CD; digital download; streaming	S.M. Entertainment
Japan	March 16, 2018	CD; digital download; streaming	S.M. Entertainment
