= The 7th Sense =

Single by NCT U

from the album NCT 2018 Empathy
- Released: April 9, 2016
- Recorded: 2016
- Studio: SM Blue Cup Studio; Ingrid Studio
- Genre: Hip hop; future bass
- Length: 3:34
- Label: SM
- Composers: Timothy "Bos" Bullock; Jeremy "Tay" Jasper; MZMC; Michael Jiminez; Sara Forsberg; Leven Kali
- Lyricists: January 8th; Kim Dong-hyun; Cho Jin-joo; Taeyong; Mark
- Producers: Timothy "Bos" Bullock; Jeremy "Tay" Jasper

NCT U singles chronology
"The 7th Sense" (2016)	"Without You" (2016)

NCT singles chronology
"The 7th Sense" (2016)	"Without You" (2016)

Music video
- "The 7th Sense" on YouTube

"The 7th Sense" (Korean: 일곱 번째 감각; RR: Ilgop beonjjae gamgak) is the debut single by South Korean boy group NCT U, the first sub-unit of NCT. It was released digitally on April 9, 2016, through SM Entertainment. Musically, "The 7th Sense" was described as a future bass genre based on hip-hop grooves, with heavy bass sounds and dreamy vocals and rap.

== Background and release ==
On January 28, 2016, SM Entertainment founder Lee Soo-man delivered a presentation at the SM Coex Artium, titled "SMTOWN: New Culture Technology 2016." The label's plan was to debut a new boy group with an "unlimited" number of members with their "culture contents" strategy. They released a video called "SM_NCT#2 Synchronization of your dreams" where Taeyong, Hansol, Ten, Mark, and Jaehyun performed a dance, there was a song teaser vocal by Taeyong, Doyoung, Jaehyun, Mark, & Haechan. The music video for "The 7th Sense" was released on April 8, 2016, released on SMTOWN's official YouTube Channel.

== Composition ==
In an interview, the composer said he was curious about the new idol group's debut with the song and that a foreign reaction would be good. On the last day of the SM songwriting camp, a composer put out a beat, which came out very well, and eight or nine composers made it. Taeyong and Mark participated in rap making. The lyrics introduce the NCT score keyword, "Seventh Sense," which means a sense of feeling and understanding each other's dreams through music. It contains NCT's desire and aspiration to communicate powerfully with the public in the future.

== Accolades ==
"The 7th Sense" on critic lists
Critic/Publication	List	Rank	Ref.
Billboard	The 100 Greatest K-Pop Songs of the 2010s: Staff List	83	
Dazed	The 20 best K-Pop tracks of the year	13	
Insider	13 Best K-pop Debut Songs of All Time	Included	
Medium	25 Best K-Pop Songs of the 2010s (Ciarra Gaffney)	25	
Melon	Top 100 K-pop Songs of All Time	50	
SBS PopAsia	SBS PopAsia's Top 100 songs of 2016	41	

== Charts ==
=== Weekly charts ===
Chart (2016)	Peak position
South Korea (Gaon)	111
US World Digital Songs (Billboard)	2

=== Year-end charts ===
Chart (2016)	Position
US World Digital Songs (Billboard)	25

== Credits and personnel ==
Credits adapted from album's liner notes.

=== Studio ===
- SM Blue Cup Studio – recording, mixing
- Ingrid Studio – recording, additional vocal editing
- SM Booming System – digital editing
- Sterling Sound – mastering

=== Personnel ===
- SM Entertainment – executive producer
- Lee Soo-man – producer
- NCT U – vocals
  - Taeyong – rap
  - Mark – rap
  - Doyoung – vocals, background vocals
  - Jaehyun – vocals
  - Ten – vocals
- Kim Dong-hyun – lyrics
- Cho Jin-joo – lyrics
- January 8th – lyrics
- Ju Chan-yang – vocal directing
- Timothy "BOS" Bullock – producer, composition, arrangement
- Jeremy "Tay" Jasper – producer, composition, arrangement
- Michael Jiminez – composition
- MZMC – composition
- Sara Forsberg – composition
- Leven Kali – composition
- Jung Eui-seok – recording, mixing
- Jung Eun-kyung – recording, additional vocal editing
- Yoo Young-jin – digital editing, music and sound supervisor
- Randy Merrill – mastering

== Release history ==
Region	Date	Format	Label
South Korea	April 9, 2016	Digital download; streaming; Promotional CD	SM Entertainment
Various	April 9, 2016	Digital download; streaming; Promotional CD	SM Entertainment
