= List of NCT 127 live performances =

NCT 127 live performances
- Concert tours: 5

The South Korean boy band NCT 127 has headlined five concert tours and participated in joint tours with the musical collective SM Town. The band's first concert tour, Neo City – The Origin, visited Asia, Europe, and North America from January 2019 to February 2020. NCT 127 has also performed at music festivals and on music programs.

== Concert tours ==
=== Headlining ===
List of headlining concert tours, with dates, associated album(s), location(s), number of shows, and attendance
Title	Dates	Associated album(s)	Continent(s)	Shows	Attendance	Ref.
Neo City – The Origin	January 26, 2019 – February 24, 2020	NCT #127; Limitless; Cherry Bomb; Chain; Regular-Irregular	Asia; Europe; North America	45	—N/a	
Neo City – The Link	December 17, 2021 – January 28, 2023	Neo Zone; Sticker	Asia; North America; South America	28	700,000	
Neo City – The Unity	November 17, 2023 – March 10, 2024	2 Baddies; Fact Check	Asia	19	417,000 (Note: Figures for 18 shows)	
Neo City – The Momentum	January 18, 2025 – May 22, 2025	Walk	Asia; North America	24	—N/a	
Neo City – The Redline	September 18, 2026 – January 16, 2027	Blingy	Asia	15	—N/a	

=== Joint ===
List of joint concert tours, with headlining act, dates, associated album, locations, and number of shows
Title	Headlining act	Dates	Associated album(s)	Continents/countries	Shows	Ref.
SM Town Live World Tour VI	SM Town	July 8, 2017 – April 6, 2018	—N/a	Japan; South Korea; United Arab Emirates	6	
SM Town Live 2022: SMCU Express	SM Town	August 20–29, 2022	2021 Winter SM Town: SMCU Express	Japan; South Korea	4	
SM Town Live 2023: SMCU Palace	SM Town	January 1, 2023 – February 22, 2024	2022 Winter SM Town: SMCU Palace	Indonesia; Japan	3	
NCT Nation: To the World	NCT	August 26–September 17, 2023	Golden Age	Japan; South Korea	5	
SM Town Live 2025: The Culture, the Future	SM Town	January 11, 2025 – February 14, 2026	2025 SM Town: The Culture, the Future	Asia; Europe; North America	10	

== Concerts ==
=== Headlining ===
List of headlining concerts, with date, platform, performed songs, and number of viewers
Title	Date	Platform	Performed songs	Viewers	Ref.
Beyond the Origin	May 17, 2020	Beyond Live	"Cherry Bomb"; "Chain"; "Regular" (English version); "Boom"; "Make Your Day"; "White Night"; "Kick It" (DJ Johnny remix); "Love Me Now" (DJ Johnny remix); "Superhuman"; "Wake Up"; "Baby Don't Like It"; "Punch"; "Touch"; "Highway to Heaven" (English version); "Kick It"	104,000	

=== Joint ===
List of joint concerts, with headlining act, date(s), location or platform(s), and performed song(s)
Title	Headlining act	Date(s)	Venue/platform(s)	City	Country	Performed song(s)	Ref.
SM Town Special Stage	SM Town	January 18–19, 2019	Estadio Nacional	Santiago	Chile	—N/a	
SM Town Live	SM Town	August 3–5, 2019	Tokyo Dome	Tokyo	Japan	—N/a	
Resonance: Global Wave	NCT	December 27, 2020	Beyond Live	—N/a		"Kick It"	
SM Town Live Culture Humanity	SM Town	January 1, 2021	Various (Note: Broadcast for free on platforms such as V Live, YouTube, Twitter, Facebook, and TikTok)	—N/a		"Punch"; "Kick It"	
SM Town Live 2022: SMCU Express at Kwangya	SM Town	January 1, 2022	Various	—N/a		"Favorite (Vampire)"; "Sticker"	
SM Town Live 2023: SMCU Palace at Kwangya	SM Town	January 1, 2023	Various	—N/a		"Cherry Bomb"; "Kick It"; "2 Baddies" (Note: Incomplete set list)	

== Festivals ==
List of festival performances, with date, name of the event, location, and performed song(s)
Date	Event	Venue	City	Country	Performed song(s)	Ref.
July 26, 2025	SBS Gayo Daejeon	Korea International Exhibition Center	Goyang	South Korea	"Gas"; "Far"; "2 Baddies	
August 1, 2025	KCON	Crypto.com Arena	Los Angeles	United States	"Kick It"; "Whiplash"; "2 Baddies"; "Fact Check"	
August 14, 2026	KCON	Crypto.com Arena	Los Angeles	United States	"Lemonade"; "2 Baddies"; "Summer 127"; "Touch"; "Piñata"; "Fact Check"; "Kick It"; "Walk"	

== Television shows and specials ==
List of television performances, with date, name of the program, location, and performed song(s)
Date	Television program	Country	Performed song(s)	Ref.
August 19, 2026	America's Got Talent	United States	"Kick It"; "Piñata"	
