= NCT 127 discography =

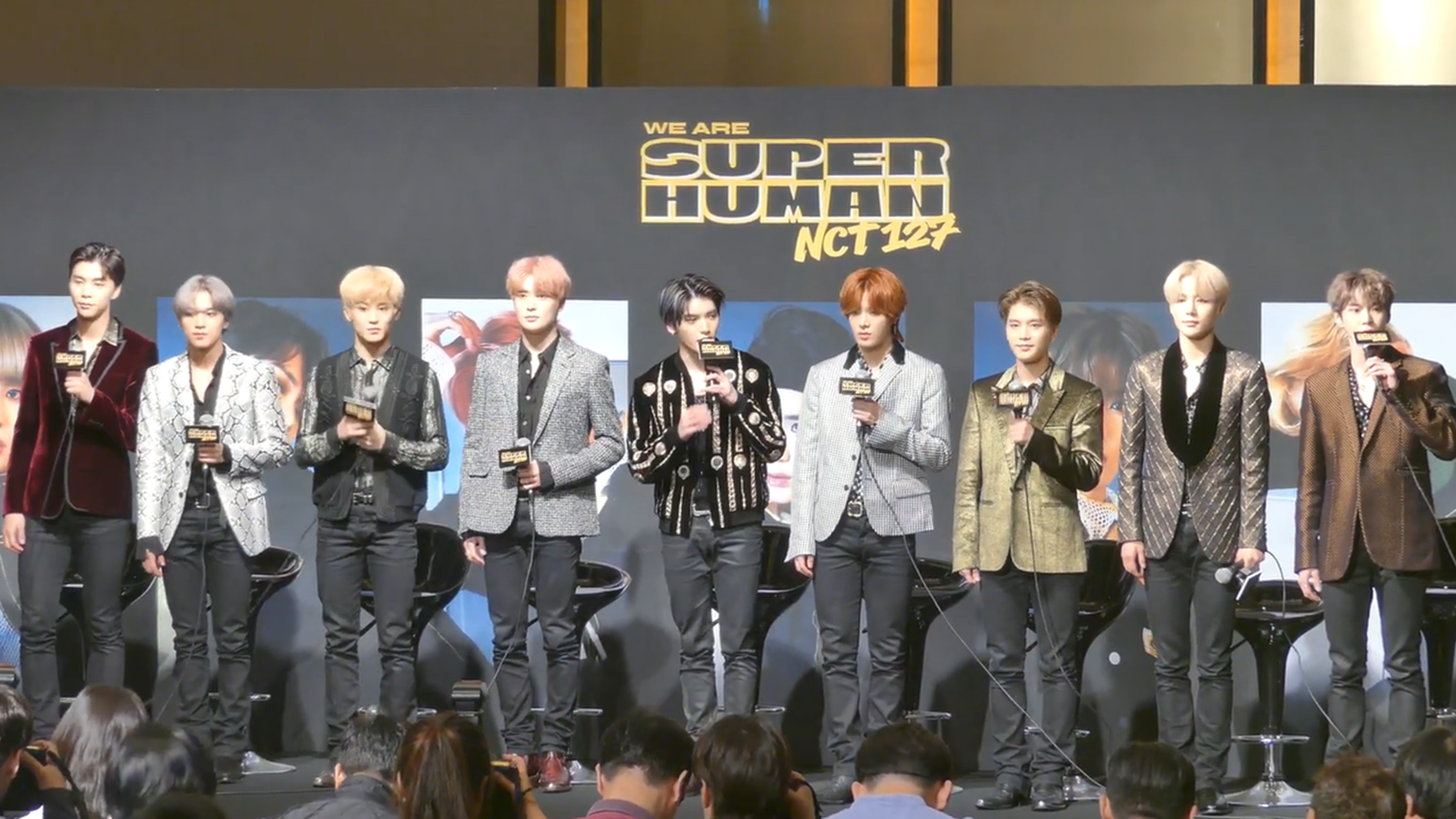
- Studio albums: 8
- EPs: 7
- Live albums: 3
- Singles: 19
- Single album: 1
- Reissues: 4
- Promotional singles: 2

South Korean boy band NCT 127 have released eight studio albums, four reissues, three live albums, one single album, seven extended plays, and nineteen singles. To date, NCT 127 have earned ten number-one albums and two number-one singles in South Korea.

The group debuted in 2016 with their eponymous extended play and its lead single "Fire Truck" as a sub-unit of NCT. It was followed by two extended plays, Limitless and Cherry Bomb, released in 2017. Each spawned one single: "Limitless" and "Cherry Bomb". The following year, the group recorded a single, "Touch", for NCT's first studio album as a complete group, titled NCT 2018 Empathy. In May 2018, they debuted their first Japanese-language extended play, Chain. Its lead single of the name was their first song to chart on the Billboard Japan Hot 100. In October 2018, they released their first studio album, Regular-Irregular, and its lead single of the same name. The album was their first release to appear on the Billboard 200, charting at number 86. Regular-Irregular was followed shortly afterwards by the album's reissue, Regulate, and its lead single "Simon Says". That same year, they released a digital-exclusive Up Next extended play for Apple Music.

In April 2019, they released their first Japanese-language studio album, Awaken, preceded by two singles, "Wakey-Wakey" and the Japanese version of "Touch". The group's fourth Korean extended play, We Are Superhuman released in May 2019 alongside its lead single "Superhuman". Preceded by the single "Dreams Come True", their second Korean-language studio album Neo Zone was released in March 2020 alongside a second single, "Kick It". Combined with its reissue, Neo Zone: The Final Round, it became their first album to sell one million copies. The reissue spawned a third single, "Punch", which became their first to reach the top-10 of the Circle Digital Chart. In 2021, they released their second Japanese-language extended play Loveholic, which was their first release to chart atop the Oricon Albums Chart. It was supported by a first pre-release single, "First Love", and a lead single "Gimme Gimme".

Their third Korean-language studio album, Sticker, was their first album to be certified 2× Million by the Korea Music Content Association (KMCA). It was released in September 2021 alongside its lead single of the same name, which became their first single to chart on the Billboard Global 200. The album was reissued under the name Favorite and a second single, "Favorite (Vampire)", was released. NCT 127 released their fourth Korean-language studio album, 2 Baddies, in September 2022 alongside its lead single of the same name. It was followed by its reissue, Ay-Yo, in January 2023. The single "Ay-Yo" debuted at number one, becoming the group's first single to top the Circle Digital Chart. That year, NCT 127 also released their fifth Korean-language studio album, Fact Check, and their first single album, Be There For Me, which was supported by a lead single of the same name that topped the Circle Digital Chart.

== Albums ==
=== Studio albums ===
List of studio albums, with selected details, chart positions, sales, and certifications
Title	Details	Peak positions										Sales	Certifications
Title	Details	KOR	AUS	CAN	FRA	GER	JPN	JPN Hot	SPA	UK	US	Sales	Certifications
Regular-Irregular	Released: October 12, 2018; Label: SM Entertainment; Formats: CD, digital download, streaming	1	— (Note: Regular-Irregular did not enter the ARIA Top 100 Albums Chart, but peaked at number 19 on the Digital Albums Chart.)	—	—	—	6	24	—	— (Note: Regular-Irregular did not enter the UK Albums Chart, but peaked at number 42 on the Album Downloads Chart.)	86	KOR: 370,616; JPN: 28,435; US: 8,000	KMCA: Platinum
Awaken	Released: April 17, 2019 (JPN); Label: Avex Trax; Formats: CD, CD+DVD, CD+Blu-ray, digital download, streaming	—	—	—	—	—	4	4	—	—	—	JPN: 56,710	
Neo Zone	Released: March 6, 2020; Label: SM Entertainment; Formats: CD, digital download, streaming	1	—	26	—	—	3	14	—	— (Note: Neo Zone did not enter the UK Albums Chart, but peaked at number 34 on the Album Downloads Chart.)	5	KOR: 1,067,850; JPN: 52,728; US: 249,000	KMCA: 3× Platinum
Sticker	Released: September 17, 2021; Label: SM Entertainment; Formats: CD, digital download, streaming	1	16	—	163	16	1	9	65	40	3	KOR: 2,437,094; JPN: 141,450; US: 140,000	KMCA: 2× Million
2 Baddies	Released: September 16, 2022; Label: SM Entertainment; Formats: CD, SMC, digital download, streaming	2	3	—	127	65	2	2	31	— (Note: 2 Baddies did not enter the UK Albums Chart, but peaked at number 76 on the Album Downloads Chart.)	3	KOR: 1,994,316; JPN: 139,243; US: 148,000	KMCA: Million
Fact Check	Released: October 6, 2023; Label: SM Entertainment; Formats: CD, download, streaming	1	9	—	45	—	2	2	57	—	16	WW: 1,900,000; KOR: 1,869,593; JPN: 137,354; US: 39,000	KMCA: Million; RIAJ: Gold
Walk	Released: July 15, 2024; Label: SM Entertainment; Formats: CD, download, streaming	1	—	—	178	—	7	6	—	—	117	KOR: 1,122,916; JPN: 29,196	KMCA: 3× Platinum
Blingy	Released: August 24, 2026; Label: SM Entertainment; Formats: CD, download, streaming	2	—	—	—	—	8	7	—	—	129	KOR: 970,581; JPN: 15,631	

=== Reissues ===
List of reissues, with selected details, chart positions and sales
Title	Details	Peak positions									Sales	Certifications
Title	Details	KOR	AUS	HUN	JPN	JPN Hot	PRT	SWI	US	US World	Sales	Certifications
Regulate	Released: November 23, 2018; Label: SM Entertainment; Formats: CD, download, streaming	2	—	—	—	—	—	—	—	9	KOR: 257,559	KMCA: Platinum
Neo Zone: The Final Round	Released: May 19, 2020; Label: SM Entertainment; Formats: CD, download, streaming	1	—	15	—	21	—	—	—	—	KOR: 712,725	KMCA: 2× Platinum
Favorite	Released: October 25, 2021; Label: SM Entertainment; Formats: CD, download, streaming	2	—	—	—	3	—	94	—	—	KOR: 1,165,336	KMCA: 3× Platinum
Ay-Yo	Release: January 30, 2023; Label: SM Entertainment; Formats: CD, download, streaming	1	13	15	2	2	2	—	13	1	KOR: 1,212,376; JPN: 45,664; US: 38,500	KMCA: Million

=== Live albums ===
List of live albums, with selected details
Title	Details	Sales
Neo City: Japan – The Origin	Released: June 26, 2019; Label: Avex Trax; Formats: DVD, Blu-ray	JPN: 11,830
Neo City: Seoul – The Origin	Released: October 17, 2019; Label: SM Entertainment; Formats: CD, SMC, download, streaming	
Neo City: Japan – The Link	Released: September 28, 2022; Label: Avex Trax; Formats: CD+Blu-ray	JPN: 40,518

=== Single album ===
List of single albums, with selected details
Title	Details	Peak positions		Sales	Certifications
Title	Details	KOR	JPN	Sales	Certifications
Be There for Me	Released: December 22, 2023; Label: SM Entertainment; Formats: CD, download, streaming	1	9	KOR: 961,757; JPN: 11,013	KMCA: 3× Platinum

== Extended plays ==
List of extended plays, with selected details, chart positions, sales, and certifications
Title	Details	Peak chart positions									Sales	Certifications
Title	Details	KOR	CAN	FRA Dig.	JPN	JPN Hot	SPA	UK Down.	US	US World	Sales	Certifications
NCT #127	Released: July 10, 2016; Label: SM Entertainment; Formats: CD, download, streaming	1	—	79	40	—	—	—	—	2	KOR: 161,444; JPN: 6,657	
Limitless	Released: January 6, 2017; Label: SM Entertainment; Formats: CD, download, streaming	1	—	—	13	40	—	—	—	1	KOR: 222,128; JPN: 11,179	
Cherry Bomb	Released: June 14, 2017; Label: SM Entertainment; Formats: CD, download, streaming	2	—	—	18	27	—	—	—	2	KOR: 231,371; JPN: 9,208	
Chain	Released: May 23, 2018 (JPN); Label: Avex Trax; Formats: CD, CD+DVD, cassette, download, streaming	—	—	—	2	3	—	—	—	8	JPN: 55,045 (Phy.); JPN: 750 (Dig.)	
Up Next Session: NCT 127	Released: October 22, 2018; Label: Apple Music, SM Entertainment; Formats: Download, streaming	—	—	142	— (Note: Up Next Session: NCT 127 did not enter the Oricon Albums Chart, but peaked at number 21 on the Digital Albums Chart.)	80	—	—	—	—		
We Are Superhuman	Released: May 24, 2019; Label: SM Entertainment; Formats: CD, download, streaming, LP, SMC	1	64	43	6	23	77	54	11	1	KOR: 416,919; JPN: 9,894; US: 25,000	KMCA: Platinum
Loveholic	Released: February 17, 2021 (JPN); Label: Avex Trax; Formats: CD, CD+Blu-Ray, download, streaming	—	—	*	1	1	—	—	—	—	JPN: 153,248	RIAJ (Phy.): Gold

== Singles ==
List of singles, with selected chart positions, showing year released, sales, certifications and album name
Title	Year	Peak chart positions								Sales (Note: Korean-language singles are downloads while Japanese-language singles are physical units, except noted.)	Album
Title	Year	KOR	KOR Billb. (Note: Includes the Billboard K-pop Hot 100 (defunct as of 2022), and South Korea Songs (part of Billboard's Hits of the World (2022 onwards)).)	JPN Hot	NZ Hot	SGP Reg.	UK DL	US World	WW	Sales	Album
"Fire Truck" (소방차)	2016	103	—	—	—	—	—	2	—	KOR: 30,067; US: 3,000	NCT #127
"Limitless" (무한적아; 無限的我)	2017	— (Note: "Limitless" did not enter the Gaon Digital Chart, but peaked at number 83 on the Gaon Download Chart.)	—	—	—	—	—	4	—	KOR: 18,390	Limitless
"Cherry Bomb"	2017	47	—	—	—	—	—	3	—	KOR: 71,061	Cherry Bomb
"Touch"	2018	— (Note: "Touch" did not enter the Gaon Digital Chart, but peaked at number 31 on the Gaon Download Chart.)	54	— (Note: "Touch" did not enter the Billboard Japan Hot 100, but it peaked at number 60 on the Download Songs chart.)	—	—	—	11	—	—N/a	NCT 2018 Empathy
"Chain"	2018	—	—	21	—	—	—	—	—	—N/a	Chain
"Regular"	2018	92	16	—	—	6	—	2	—	US: 3,000	Regular-Irregular
"Simon Says"	2018	— (Note: "Simon Says" did not enter the Gaon Digital Chart, but peaked at number 59 on the Gaon Download Chart.)	39	—	37	22	—	1	—	US: 2,000	Regulate
"Wakey-Wakey"	2019	—	—	85	—	—	—	—	—	—N/a	Awaken
"Superhuman"	2019	117	13	90	—	—	—	3	—	US: 1,000	We Are Superhuman
"Highway to Heaven" (English version)	2019	—	—	—	—	—	—	5	—	—N/a	We Are Superhuman
"Kick It" (영웅; 英雄)	2020	21	9	84	38	16	—	3	—	—N/a	Neo Zone
"Punch"	2020	5	39	32	—	—	—	5	—	—N/a	Neo Zone: The Final Round
"First Love"	2021	—	—	71	—	—	—	—	—	—N/a	Loveholic
"Gimme Gimme"	2021	— (Note: "Gimme Gimme" did not enter the Gaon Digital Chart, but peaked at number 108 on the Gaon Download Chart.)	—	43	—	—	—	4	—	—N/a	Loveholic
"Sticker"	2021	5	25	55	—	16	—	5	101	—N/a	Sticker
"Favorite (Vampire)"	2021	2	12	56	—	19	—	8	186	—N/a	Favorite
"2 Baddies"	2022	8	21	45	—	—	—	11	—	—N/a	2 Baddies
"Ay-Yo"	2023	1	—	92	—	—	—	—	—	—N/a	Ay-Yo
"Fact Check"	2023	2	7	33	37	26	—	8	89	—N/a	Fact Check
"Be There for Me"	2023	1	—	— (Note: "Be There for Me" did not enter the Billboard Japan Hot 100, but it peaked at number 49 on the Download Songs chart.)	—	—	13	—	—	—N/a	Be There for Me
"Colors"	2024	—	—	— (Note: "Colors" did not enter the Billboard Japan Hot 100, but it peaked at number 86 on the Download Songs chart.)	—	—	—	—	—	—N/a	Non-album single
"Walk" (삐그덕)	2024	1	16	—	—	—	19	—	—	—N/a	Walk
"Blingy"	2026	1	—	—	—	—	43	—	—	—N/a	Blingy

== Promotional singles ==
Title	Year	Album	Notes
"Taste the Feeling"	2016	SM Station Season 1	Collaboration with Coca-Cola
"Good Thing"	2017	Limitless	Collaboration with W Korea

== Soundtrack appearances ==
Title	Year	Peak chart positions	Album
Title	Year	KOR Down.	Album
"Freeze"	2021	144	Kartrider X Line Friends OST
"Amino Acid"	2021	—	Analog Trip OST

== Collaborations ==
Title	Year	Peak chart positions				Sales	Album
Title	Year	KOR	CHN	NZ Hot	US World	Sales	Album
"Let's Shut Up & Dance" (with Lay and Jason Derulo)	2019	— (Note: "Let's Shut Up & Dance" did not enter the Gaon Digital Chart, but its physical version appeared at number 32 on the Album Chart.)	35	34	—	KOR: 3,952 (Phy.)	Non-album single
"Save" (with Amoeba Culture)	2021	191	—	—	8	—N/a	Non-album single

=== As featured artist ===
Title	Year	Album
"So Am I" (Ava Max featuring NCT 127)	2019	Non-album single

== Other charted songs ==
List of other charted songs, with selected chart positions
Title	Year	Peak chart positions			Album
Title	Year	KOR	KOR Billb.	US World	Album
"Welcome to My Playground"	2018	—	—	7	Regulate
"Elevator (127F)"	2020	116	42	—	Neo Zone
"Boom" (꿈)	2020	132	44	—	Neo Zone
"Pandora's Box" (낮잠)	2020	137	47	—	Neo Zone
"Day Dream" (白日夢)	2020	148	49	—	Neo Zone
"Interlude: Neo Zone"	2020	—	53	—	Neo Zone
"Mad Dog" (뿔)	2020	197	57	—	Neo Zone
"Sit Down!"	2020	191	56	25	Neo Zone
"Love Me Now" (메아리)	2020	141	49	—	Neo Zone
"Love Song" (우산)	2020	135	47	—	Neo Zone
"White Night" (백야)	2020	176	54	—	Neo Zone
"Not Alone"	2020	193	59	—	Neo Zone
"Dreams Come True"	2020	196	60	—	Neo Zone
"NonStop"	2020	164	64	11	Neo Zone: The Final Round
"Prelude"	2020	—	83	—	Neo Zone: The Final Round
"Make Your Day"	2020	—	80	—	Neo Zone: The Final Round
"Music, Dance"	2020	181	—	—	NCT 2020 Resonance Pt. 1
"Lemonade"	2021	60	67	8	Sticker
"Breakfast"	2021	109	—	—	Sticker
"Focus" (같은 시선)	2021	118	—	—	Sticker
"The Rainy Night" (내일의 나에게)	2021	102	—	—	Sticker
"Far"	2021	135	—	—	Sticker
"Bring the Noize"	2021	147	—	—	Sticker
"Magic Carpet Ride"	2021	127	—	—	Sticker
"Road Trip"	2021	95	—	—	Sticker
"Dreamer"	2021	110	—	—	Sticker
"Promise You" (다시 만나는 날)	2021	120	—	—	Sticker
"Love on the Floor"	2021	114	—	17	Favorite
"Pilot"	2021	131	—	23	Favorite
"Faster"	2022	129	—	—	2 Baddies
"Crash Landing" (불시착)	2022	188	—	—	2 Baddies
"Designer"	2022	167	—	—	2 Baddies
"Gold Dust" (윤슬)	2022	111	—	—	2 Baddies
"Black Clouds" (흑백 영화)	2022	157	—	—	2 Baddies
"LOL (Laugh-Out-Loud)"	2022	191	—	—	2 Baddies
"DJ"	2023	105	—	—	Ay-Yo
"Skyscraper" (마천루)	2023	127	—	—	Ay-Yo
"Space" (무중력)	2023	136	—	—	Fact Check
"Parade" (행진)	2023	189	—	—	Fact Check
"Angel Eyes"	2023	151	—	—	Fact Check
"Home Alone" (나 홀로 집에)	2023	139	—	—	Be There for Me
"Pricey"	2024	200	—	—	Walk
"Meaning of Love" (사랑한다는 말의 뜻을 알아가자)	2024	137	—	—	Walk
"You in Vague Memory"	2025	— (Note: "You in Vague Memory" did not enter the Circle Digital Chart; it peaked at number 113 on the component Download Chart.)	—	—	2025 SM Town: The Culture, the Future
