= Neo City – The Link =

2021–23 concert tour by NCT 127

- Tour by NCT 127
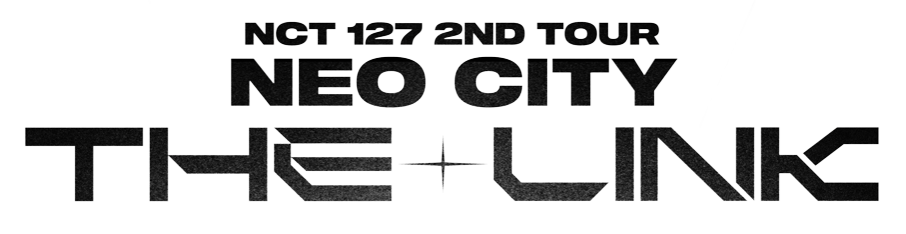
- Official logo
- Associated album: Sticker; 2 Baddies
- Start date: December 17, 2021
- End date: January 28, 2023
- Legs: 5
- No. of shows: 17 in Asia; 5 in North America; 6 in Latin America; 28 in total

NCT 127 concert chronology
- Neo City – The Origin (2019–2020); Neo City – The Link (2021–2023); Neo City – The Unity (2023–2024)

Neo City – The Link (or NCT 127 2nd Tour "NEO CITY – THE LINK") was the second concert tour headlined by NCT 127, the Seoul-based sub-unit of South Korean boy group NCT, in support of their third studio album Sticker (2021) and fourth studio album 2 Baddies (2022). The tour ran from December 2021 until January 2023, with a total of 28 shows in 17 cities across Asia, North America, and Latin America. It recorded over 700,000 spectators from stadiums and arenas, making it NCT 127's biggest tour yet. It was the group's first in-person concert tour since Neo City – The Origin, two years prior, following the cancellation of Neo City – The Awards in 2020 due to the COVID-19 pandemic. The tour was featured in the Disney+ documentary series NCT 127: The Lost Boys (2023).

== Background ==
On November 15, 2021, NCT 127 officially announced their return to touring with their reworked second world tour, Neo City – The Link, in support of their third studio album, Sticker, beginning in December 2021 in Seoul. The name of the tour, The Link, references the "NCT universe", wherein the audience members are linked through music and dreams. The Seoul concerts were the first to be held at the reopened Gocheok Sky Dome since the COVID-19 pandemic began, as well as NCT 127's first domestic concerts in nearly three years. Attendees were required to present proof of vaccination and a negative PCR test and observe social distancing at all times. Shouting was not allowed in the venue, and fans were instead encouraged to clap loudly. Only 5,000 people were admitted despite the venue being able to accommodate 20,000 to 30,000 people; however, the Seoul concert on December 19 was live-streamed on V Live (Beyond Live) for global fans and at CGV Cinemas in South Korea for domestic fans.

Two additional shows were announced for January 2022 at the Saitama Super Arena in Japan. These were later canceled in December 2021 due to new border controls and restrictions implemented by the Japanese government in response to the Omicron COVID-19 variant. NCT 127 later performed five sold-out shows throughout Japan—at the Tokyo Dome in Tokyo, the Vantelin Dome in Nagoya, and the Kyocera Dome in Osaka—to a total of 220,000 spectators. The first concert at Tokyo Dome on May 28 was live-streamed on Beyond Live.

On July 2, NCT 127 held a sold-out concert at the Singapore Indoor Stadium in Singapore. On August 12, it was announced that NCT 127 would continue touring in September, starting in the Philippines on September 4 at the SM Mall of Asia Arena in Manila.

Following the release of NCT 127's fourth album, 2 Baddies, in September 2022, the set lists were revised to include material from the new album. NCT 127 debuted a new set list at the Crypto.com Arena in Los Angeles, California, completing the sold-out North American leg of their tour at the Prudential Center in Newark, New Jersey, on October 6 and 13, respectively. On October 22 and 23, a special two-day concert was held at the Seoul Olympic Stadium, titled "Neo City: Seoul – The Link+" and featuring another new set list.

NCT 127 performed in Jakarta, Indonesia at the Indonesia Convention Exhibition on November 4 and 5, and later held a 3-day concert in Bangkok, Thailand at the IMPACT Arena from December 3 to 5.

In January 2023, NCT 127 returned to the United States for three more shows at the United Center in Chicago, Illinois, the Toyota Center in Houston, Texas, and the State Farm Arena in Atlanta, Georgia. They continued on to Latin America for their fifth and final leg of the tour, beginning with three shows at the Vibra São Paulo in São Paulo, Brazil. They later performed at the Movistar Arena in Santiago, Chile and the Movistar Arena in Bogotá, Colombia, with the latter making NCT 127 the first K-pop act to hold a large-scale concert in Colombia. The tour concluded with a show at the Palacio de los Deportes in Mexico City, Mexico.

== Concert synopsis ==
Official poster for The Link+

The concert's opening video features NCT. 127 introducing the "NCT universe". The nine members first appear physically on elevated platforms that are lowered for "Kick It" and "Lemonade". Next is "Earthquake", recorded by NCT 127 for the NCT album Universe (2021), performed on a tilting stage, in line with the song's themes, in its live debut.

After greeting the audience, NCT 127 performs a series of "brighter-themed" songs—"Elevator (127F)," "Dreamer," and "Love Song". For "Elevator (127F)", the set is transformed into an elevator setting, while "Love Song" is accompanied by rain sound effects and umbrella props in the choreography. The show then segues into a series of solo and unit performances. Taeil sings a reworked R&B version of "Another World" before he joins Haechan for "Love Sign," during which Haechan performs a solo dance break. Johnny, Taeyong, Yuta, and Jaehyun subsequently perform a mashup of "Run Back 2 U" and its demo version "Bassbot," which the four performed years prior as part of the pre-debut project SM Rookies. NCT 127 reunites for "Music, Dance", "Highway to Heaven", and "Breakfast", with the latter song serving as a point of interaction with the audience, as NCT 127 invites them to move the group's official fanlight. After an intermission music video of "Running 2 U," Mark and Taeyong perform their solo songs "Vibration" and "Moonlight", respectively, before performing "The Himalayas" together. Taeyong begins "Moonlight" on an elevated stage shaped like the moon.

A video featuring "Lipstick" from the group's Japanese extended play Loveholic (2021) plays. Jungwoo then performs a dance to a remixed version of the song. The performance marks a change in tone in the concert from "day to night" as the group begins performing more sensual songs. NCT 127 regroups to perform "Focus", during which Johnny performs a solo dance break while shirtless in a closed room resembling a shower. Jaehyun performs his solo song "Lost" before the group returns to perform two ballads, "The Rainy Night" and "White Night". After a video intermission focusing on Doyoung, he sings "The Reason Why It's Favorite", a solo ballad version of their single "Favorite (Vampire)", written for him by songwriter Kenzie. The entire group performs the original version of "Favorite (Vampire)" and the 2018 single "Simon Says". For "Love On the Floor", the band performs on a stage that rotates 360 degrees and raises into a slanted protrusion. After "Bring The Noize", Yuta performs his solo song "Butterfly". Personal notes from the band are displayed on screen for the audience, and the group performs "refreshing" songs "Paradise", "Love Me Now", "Touch", and "Pilot" before ending the main set with "Sticker" and "Cherry Bomb".

On the concerts following the release of NCT 127's fourth studio album 2 Baddies, the set list is updated to include the albums' opening track "Faster" and its title track "2 Baddies". The two songs are performed after "Sticker" and before the encore.

A final intermission video plays prior to the encore that concludes the "NCT universe" storyline from the beginning of the concert. NCT 127 returns for the final time to perform "Dreams Come True". Each member gives their final speeches to the audience before the show ends with "Promise You", and the group departs the stage through lifted platforms.

== Incidents in Indonesia ==
=== Bomb threat ===
On November 4, 2022, a bomb threat targeting NCT 127's concert at the Indonesia Convention Exhibition center was reported to the Greater Jakarta Metropolitan Regional Police. The bomb threat was spread through a post on Twitter, which contains photos of a handwritten note that reads, "ICE BSD Nov. 4 S.O.S. 11 people 3 cars [with explosives] TNT, TATP", detailing the location, date, number of perpetrators, and types of explosive devices to be used on the bombing.

The police unit sent a bomb squad and K9 units to the concert venue to detect explosives, with later reports confirming that the concert venue was safe and that no explosives were found. Endra Zulpan, the spokesperson for the Greater Jakarta Metropolitan Regional Police, announced that the individual who spread the bomb threat has been identified, and that further investigations would privately proceed through questionings. Following the investigative reports, law enforcement authorities and the concert promoter, Dyandra Global, confirmed that the concert would go through as planned, with heightened security around the venue.

=== Stampede and mass fainting ===
Following the bomb threat, a stampede and mass fainting occurred in the audience during NCT 127's performance. The stampede took place during the performance for "Paradise", where members of NCT 127 were throwing signed merchandises to the audience. Spectators at the standing section began pushing forward in an attempt to receive merchandises, resulting in audience members and barricades falling. At least 30 spectators were reported to have fainted.

The concert was later cut short and cancelled in an announcement by Dyandra Global and law enforcement officials, while the concert on the following day, November 5, continued with additional paramedics and security personnel. According to Sarly Sollu, Chief of the South Tangerang Police, several conditions were applied to the November 5 concert, including widening the gap between the stage and the audience, as well as withdrawing the merchandise throwing event.

== Set lists ==
Set list in Seoul

Main set

1. "Kick It"
2. "Lemonade"
3. "Earthquake"
4. "Elevator (127F)"
5. "Dreamer"
6. "Love Song"
7. "Another World" (Taeil's solo)
8. "Love Sign" (Taeil and Haechan's duet, with Haechan's dance break)
9. "Run Back 2 U" / "Bassbot" (Johnny, Taeyong, Yuta, and Jaehyun's dance performance)
10. "Music, Dance"
11. "Highway to Heaven"
12. "Breakfast"
13. "Vibration" (Mark's solo)
14. "Moonlight" (Taeyong's solo)
15. "The Himalayas" (Taeyong and Mark's duet)
16. "Lipstick" (Jungwoo's dance performance)
17. "Focus" (with Johnny's dance break)
18. "Lost" (Jaehyun's solo)
19. "The Rainy Night"
20. "White Night"
21. "The Reason Why It's Favorite" (Doyoung's solo)
22. "Favorite (Vampire)"
23. "Simon Says"
24. "Love On the Floor"
25. "Bring The Noize"
26. "Butterfly" (Yuta's solo)
27. "Paradise" (Remix version)
28. "Love Me Now"
29. "Touch"
30. "Pilot"
31. "Sticker"
32. "Cherry Bomb"

Encore

33. "Dreams Come True"
34. "Promise You"
Set list in Japan

Main set

1. "Kick It"
2. "Lemonade"
3. "Gimme Gimme"
4. "Elevator (127F)"
5. "Love Song"
6. "First Love"
7. "Run Back 2 U" / "Bassbot" (Johnny, Taeyong, Yuta, and Jaehyun's dance performance)
8. "Love Sign" (Taeil and Haechan's duet, with Haechan's dance break)
9. "Another World" (Taeil's solo)
10. "Highway to Heaven"
11. "Breakfast"
12. "Vibration" (Mark's solo)
13. "Moonlight" (Taeyong's solo)
14. "The Himalayas" (Taeyong and Mark's duet)
15. "Lipstick" (Jungwoo's dance performance)
16. "Focus" (with Johnny's dance break)
17. "Lost" (Jaehyun's solo)
18. "The Rainy Night"
19. "White Night"
20. "Back 2 U (AM 01:27)"
21. "The Reason Why It's Favorite" (Doyoung's solo)
22. "Favorite (Vampire)"
23. "Love On the Floor"
24. "Bring The Noize"
25. "Butterfly" (Japanese ver.) (Yuta's solo)
26. "Paradise" (Remix version)
27. "Love Me Now"
28. "Chica Bom Bom"
29. "Colors"
30. "Touch" (Japanese ver.)
31. "Pilot"
32. "Sticker"
33. "Cherry Bomb"

Encore

34. "Dreams Come True"
35. "Sunny Road"
36. "Promise You"
Set list in North America and Indonesia

Main set

1. "Kick It"
2. "Lemonade"
3. "Cherry Bomb"
4. "Elevator (127F)"
5. "Dreamer"
6. "Love Song"
7. "Another World" (Taeil's solo)
8. "Love Sign" (Taeil and Haechan's duet, with Haechan's dance break)
9. "Run Back 2 U" / "Bassbot" (Johnny, Taeyong, Yuta, and Jaehyun's dance performance)
10. "Highway to Heaven" (English version)
11. "Breakfast"
12. "Vibration" (Mark's solo)
13. "Moonlight" (Taeyong's solo)
14. "The Himalayas" (Taeyong and Mark's duet)
15. "Lipstick" (Jungwoo's dance performance)
16. "Focus" (with Johnny's dance break)
17. "Lost" (Jaehyun's solo)
18. "Butterfly" (Yuta's solo)
19. "The Rainy Night"
20. "White Night"
21. "Back 2 U (AM 01:27)"
22. "The Reason Why It's Favorite" (Doyoung's solo)
23. "Favorite (Vampire)"
24. "Regular" (English version)
25. "Love On the Floor"
26. "Paradise" (Remix version)
27. "Touch"
28. "Love Me Now"
29. "Sticker"
30. "Faster"
31. "2 Baddies"

Encore

32. "Dreams Come True"
33. "Promise You"
Set list for The Link+ in Seoul

Main set

1. "Kick It"
2. "Lemonade"
3. "Limitless"
4. "Elevator (127F)"
5. "Love Song"
6. "City 127"
7. "Tasty"
8. "Highway to Heaven" (Korean version)
9. "Breakfast"
10. "Can We Go Back" (Doyoung, Jaehyun and Jungwoo's performance)
11. "Another World" (Taeil's solo)
12. "Love Sign" (Taeil and Haechan's duet, with Haechan's dance break)
13. "N.Y.C.T" (Taeil and Haechan's duet)
14. "Designer" + "Time Lapse" (Remix version)
15. "Regular" (Korean version)
16. "Vibration" (Mark's solo)
17. "Moonlight" (Taeyong's solo)
18. "LIT" (Taeyong and Mark's duet)
19. "Hello" (Johnny, Taeyong, Yuta and Mark's performance)
20. "Lipstick" (Jungwoo's dance performance)
21. "Focus" (with Johnny's dance break)
22. "Lost" (Jaehyun's solo)
23. "Back 2 U (AM 01:27)"
24. "Gold Dust"
25. "The Reason Why It's Favorite" (Doyoung's solo)
26. "Favorite (Vampire)"
27. "Love On the Floor"
28. "Bring The Noize"
29. "Butterfly" (Yuta's solo)
30. "1, 2, 7 (Time Stops)"
31. "Welcome To My Playground"
32. "Paper Plane"
33. "Touch"
34. "Sticker" + "Fire Truck" + "0 Mile" + "Punch" (Remix version)
35. "Superhuman" + "Cherry Bomb" (Remix version)
36. "Faster"
37. "2 Baddies"

Encore

38. "Dreams Come True"
39. "Black Clouds"
40. "Promise You"

== Tour dates ==
Date	City	Country	Venue	Attendance (Note: Estimated number of attendees based on news articles. The exact number during each concert may be higher.)
Leg 1 – Asia
December 17, 2021	Seoul	South Korea	Gocheok Sky Dome; Beyond Live (Note: December 19 only.)	15,000 (Note: Reduced maximum capacity due to COVID-19 preventive measures took by the South Korean government.)
December 18, 2021	Seoul	South Korea	Gocheok Sky Dome; Beyond Live	15,000
December 19, 2021	Seoul	South Korea	Gocheok Sky Dome; Beyond Live	15,000
May 22, 2022	Nagoya	Japan	Vantelin Dome Nagoya	220,000
May 28, 2022	Tokyo	Japan	Tokyo Dome; Beyond Live (Note: May 28 only.)	220,000
May 29, 2022	Tokyo	Japan	Tokyo Dome; Beyond Live	220,000
June 25, 2022	Osaka	Japan	Kyocera Dome Osaka	220,000
June 26, 2022	Osaka	Japan	Kyocera Dome Osaka	220,000
July 2, 2022	Singapore		Singapore Indoor Stadium	12,000
September 4, 2022	Manila	Philippines	SM Mall of Asia Arena	— (Note: Although the concert was sold-out, the number of spectators were not disclosed by verified sources.)
Leg 2 – North America
October 6, 2022	Los Angeles	United States	Crypto.com Arena	12,000
October 13, 2022	Newark	United States	Prudential Center	12,000
Leg 3 – Asia
October 22, 2022	Seoul	South Korea	Seoul Olympic Stadium; Beyond Live (Note: October 23 only.)	120,000
October 23, 2022	Seoul	South Korea	Seoul Olympic Stadium; Beyond Live	120,000
November 4, 2022	Jakarta	Indonesia	Indonesia Convention Exhibition	16,000
November 5, 2022	Jakarta	Indonesia	Indonesia Convention Exhibition	16,000
December 3, 2022	Bangkok	Thailand	Impact Arena	35,000
December 4, 2022	Bangkok	Thailand	Impact Arena	35,000
December 5, 2022	Bangkok	Thailand	Impact Arena	35,000
Leg 4 – North America
January 9, 2023	Chicago	United States	United Center	10,000
January 11, 2023	Houston	United States	Toyota Center	10,000
January 13, 2023	Atlanta	United States	State Farm Arena	10,000
Leg 5 – Latin America
January 18, 2023	São Paulo	Brazil	Vibra São Paulo	—
January 19, 2023	São Paulo	Brazil	Vibra São Paulo	—
January 20, 2023	São Paulo	Brazil	Vibra São Paulo	—
January 22, 2023	Santiago	Chile	Movistar Arena	10,000
January 25, 2023	Bogotá	Colombia	Movistar Arena	10,000
January 28, 2023	Mexico City	Mexico	Palacio de los Deportes	16,000
Total				700,000

=== Canceled dates ===
List of cancelled concerts, showing date, city, country, venue and reason for cancellation
Date	City	Country	Venue	Reason
January 15, 2022	Saitama	Japan	Saitama Super Arena	COVID-19 restrictions
January 16, 2022	Saitama	Japan	Saitama Super Arena	COVID-19 restrictions
