= Neo City – The Redline =

2026–2027 concert tour by NCT 127

- Tour by NCT 127
- Location: Asia
- Associated album: Blingy
- Start date: September 18, 2026
- End date: January 16, 2027
- No. of shows: 15

NCT 127 concert chronology
- Neo City – The Momentum (2025); Neo City – The Redline (2026–2027)

Neo City – The Redline (stylized as NCT 127 5th Tour 'NEO CITY – THE REDLINE') is the fifth concert tour by the South Korean boy band NCT 127, staged in support of their seventh Korean studio album, Blingy (2026). It began on September 18, 2026, in Seoul, South Korea, and will conclude on January 16, 2027, in Macau.

== Background ==
After releasing their sixth Korean studio album, Walk, in 2024, the South Korean boy band NCT 127 underwent a transitional period marked by the military enlistments of members Taeyong, Jaehyun, Doyoung, and Jungwoo and the departures of Taeil and Mark from the group. In April 2026, the band's label, SM Entertainment, announced that NCT 127 would release a new album and embark on a concert tour in the third quarter of the year in celebration of their 10th anniversary. On July 7, SM confirmed that their seventh Korean studio album, Blingy, would be released on August 24, with their fifth concert tour, Neo City – The Redline, set to launch shortly after with three shows in Seoul and visit six cities in Asia. Additional concerts in Japan, the Philippines, Malaysia, and Macau were announced on July 31. Due to Doyoung and Jungwoo's ongoing military service, the album and tour feature mainly Johnny, Taeyong, Yuta, Jaehyun, and Haechan.

== Ticketing ==
Ticket sales for all dates were first made available through presales to registered members of NCT 127's official Weverse fan club. For the Seoul dates, presales opened on Melon Ticket on July 21 and 23, followed by general sales on July 24, with all shows quickly selling out. In a promotional tie-in with Mega MGC Coffee, customers who purchased any of the four NCT 127-themed set menus through the brand's official app between September 3 and 10 were entered into a draw to win one of 16 tickets available per show. International ticket sales were managed by individual regional tour promoters across their respective ticketing platforms. For the Jakarta date, Dyandra Global Edutainment released tickets across three phases: fan club presales on August 19, promoter presales on August 20, and general sales on August 21. For the Hong Kong dates, Elf Asia held presales on August 26 and general sales on August 27 via HK Ticketing and Damai. In Singapore, Unusual Entertainment organized presales on August 20 and general sales on August 21 through Ticketmaster Singapore.

Ticket sales in Japan took place across multiple phases, starting with a first round of fan club presales on August 3, followed by a second round for fan club members on August 22 alongside a first round for members of SM Town's Japanese fan club, a third presale round, and general sales. In Thailand, SM True distributed tickets through Counter Service All Ticket across three phases: fan club presales on September 4, promoter presales on September 5, and general sales on September 6. For the Manila date, Pulp Live World organized presales on October 17 and general sales on October 18 through SM Tickets.

== Broadcast and recordings ==
The September 18 and 19 concerts were broadcast through Beyond Live and Weverse. The final Seoul date was broadcast live on the Japanese television channel KNTV and screened in 1030 theaters across 40 regions, with distribution being handled by Lotte Cinema in South Korea, Live Viewing Japan in Japan, and Trafalgar Releasing in Brazil, Mexico, Canada, the United States, the United Kingdom, Germany, Thailand, and Malaysia.

== Set list ==
This set list is representative of the concert in Seoul on September 20, 2026.

1. "Legacy"
2. "Step Up"
3. "Walk"
4. "Simon Says"
5. "Cherry Bomb"
6. "Lemonade"
7. "Punch"
8. "Bring the Noize"
9. "2 Baddies"
10. "Nonstop"
11. "IKR"
12. "Ay-Yo"
13. "Not Alone"
14. "Day After Day"
15. "0 Mile"
16. "Summer 127"
17. "Getaway"
18. "Piñata"
19. "Fire Truck"
20. "Fact Check"
21. "Kick It"
22. "Blingy"

Encore

23. "Paper Plane"
24. "Touch"
25. "Promise You"

== Tour dates ==
List of shows, with date, city, country, venue, and attendance
Date	City	Country	Venue	Attendance
September 18, 2026	Seoul	South Korea	KSPO Dome	31,500
September 19, 2026	Seoul	South Korea	KSPO Dome	31,500
September 20, 2026	Seoul	South Korea	KSPO Dome	31,500
October 3, 2026	Jakarta	Indonesia	Indonesia Arena	—N/a
October 10, 2026	Hong Kong		Kai Tak Arena	—N/a
October 11, 2026	Hong Kong		Kai Tak Arena	—N/a
October 18, 2026	Singapore		Singapore Indoor Stadium	—N/a
October 24, 2026	Tokorozawa (Note: Labeled as Saitama in promotional material)	Japan	Belluna Dome	—N/a
October 25, 2026	Tokorozawa	Japan	Belluna Dome	—N/a
October 31, 2026	Bangkok	Thailand	Thammasat Stadium	—N/a
November 1, 2026	Bangkok	Thailand	Thammasat Stadium	—N/a
December 12, 2026	Manila	Philippines	SM Mall of Asia Arena	—N/a
January 2, 2027	Taipei	Taiwan	Taipei Arena	—N/a
January 9, 2027	Kuala Lumpur	Malaysia	Unifi Arena	—N/a
January 16, 2027	Macau		The Venetian Arena	—N/a
