= Neo City – The Origin =

2019–2020 concert tour by NCT 127

- Tour by NCT 127
- Official logo
- Location: Asia; Europe; North America
- Associated album: All of NCT 127's releases (Note: Studio albums and extended plays supported by the tour: NCT #127 (2016); Limitless (2017); Cherry Bomb (2017); Chain (2018); Regular-Irregular (2018))
- Start date: January 26, 2019
- End date: February 24, 2020
- Legs: 6
- No. of shows: 45

NCT 127 concert chronology
- Neo City – The Origin (2019–2020); Neo City – The Link (2021–2023)

Neo City – The Origin was the first concert tour headlined by the South Korean boy band NCT 127. It began at the KSPO Dome in Seoul, South Korea, on January 26, 2019, and concluded at the Musashino Forest Sport Plaza in Tokyo, Japan, on February 24, 2020. It visited South Korea, Japan, Thailand, and Singapore in Asia, Russia, England, and France in Europe, and the United States, Canada, and Mexico in North America.

== Synopsis ==
Rolling Stone said that the concert featured "the members tear[ing] through plenty of hard-hitting group choreography" and singing "sensitive ballads [...] sitting down", which they described as a "a formula reminiscent of Nineties American boy bands". It featured several video montages used as transitions between different segments of the shows. NCT 127 opened the concert with a dance performance to a remix of "Cherry Bomb". Other songs that featured dance performances included "Come Back", "Limitless", "Chain", "Fly Away With Me", "Wake Up", "Heartbreaker", "Regular", "Fire Truck", "Simon Says", "Good Thing", "Touch", "Heartbreaker", and "Replay (PM 01:27)". NCT 127 sang together a mashup of "City 127", "Angel", and "Sun & Moon", while different sets of members performed "Timeless" (Taeil, Doyoung, and Jaehyun), "No Longer" (Taeil, Doyoung, Jaehyun, Jungwoo, Haechan), "Baby Don't Like It" (Taeyong, Taeil, Doyoung, and Mark), and "Mad City" (Taeyong, Jaehyun, and Mark). The group returned for an encore, during which they sang "Welcome To My Playground", "Summer 127", and "0 Mile".

== Recordings ==
Neo City: Seoul – The Origin
- Digital cover

Live album by NCT 127
- Released: October 24, 2019
- Venue: Olympic Gymnastics Arena
- Genre: K-pop
- Length: 81:58
- Languages: Korean; English
- Labels: SM; Dreamus

NCT 127 chronology
We Are Superhuman (2019)	Neo City: Seoul – The Origin (2019)	Neo Zone (2020)

NCT 127 released a video album, Neo City: Japan – The Origin, and a live album, Neo City: Seoul – The Origin, of the tour. Neo City: Japan – The Origin was released on June 26, 2019 in DVD and Blu-Ray and sold 11,830 copies in Japan. Neo City: Seoul – The Origin was released on October 17, 2019.

== Set list ==
This set list is from the concerts in Seoul on January 26–27, 2019. It does not represent all concerts throughout the tour.

Stage 1

1. "Cherry Bomb" (remix)
2. "Comeback"
3. "Limitless"
4. "Chain" (Korean version)
5. "Fly Away With Me"
6. "Back 2 U (AM 01:27)"

Stage 2

1. "City 127"
2. "Angel"
3. "Sun & Moon"
4. "Timeless"
5. "No Longer"

Stage 3

1. "Interlude: Regular to Irregular"
2. "Regular" (remix)
3. "Wake Up"
4. "Baby Don't Like It"
5. "Mad City"

Stage 4

1. "Good Thing"
2. "Touch"
3. "Heartbreaker"
4. "Replay (PM 01:27)"
5. "Fire Truck" (remix)
6. "Simon Says"

Encore

1. "Welcome To My Playground"
2. "Summer 127"
3. "0 Mile

== Tour dates ==
List of 2019 concerts, with date, city, country, venue, and attendance
Date	City	Country	Venue	Attendance
January 26	Seoul	South Korea	KSPO Dome	24,800
January 27	Seoul	South Korea	KSPO Dome	24,800
February 2	Osaka	Japan	Orix Theater	74,000
February 3	Osaka	Japan	Orix Theater	74,000
February 11	Hiroshima	Japan	Hiroshima Bunka Gakuen HBG Hall	74,000
February 12	Hiroshima	Japan	Hiroshima Bunka Gakuen HBG Hall	74,000
February 23	Kanazawa	Japan	Honda no Mori Hall	74,000
February 24	Kanazawa	Japan	Honda no Mori Hall	74,000
March 2	Sapporo	Japan	Cultural Arts Theater	74,000
March 3	Sapporo	Japan	Cultural Arts Theater	74,000
March 17	Fukuoka	Japan	Fukuoka Sunpalace Hotel & Hall	74,000
March 18	Fukuoka	Japan	Fukuoka Sunpalace Hotel & Hall	74,000
March 21	Nagoya	Japan	Nippon Tokushu Tougyou Civic Hall – Forest Hall	74,000
March 29	Saitama	Japan	Saitama Super Arena	74,000
March 30	Saitama	Japan	Saitama Super Arena	74,000
March 31	Saitama	Japan	Saitama Super Arena	74,000
April 24	Newark	United States	Prudential Center	—
April 26	Atlanta	United States	Coca-Cola Roxy	—
April 28	Miami	United States	Watsco Center	—
May 1	Dallas	United States	The Theatre at Grand Prairie	—
May 3	Phoenix	United States	Comerica Theatre	—
May 5	Houston	United States	Smart Financial Centre	—
May 7	Chicago	United States	Rosemont Theatre	—
May 9	San Jose	United States	City National Civic	—
May 10	San Jose	United States	City National Civic	—
May 12	Los Angeles	United States	Microsoft Theater	—
May 17	Toronto	Canada	Coca-Cola Coliseum	—
May 19	Vancouver	Canada	Pacific Coliseum	—
May 21	Mexico City	Mexico	Teatro Metropólitan	—
June 21	Bangkok	Thailand	Thunder Dome	18,000
June 22	Bangkok	Thailand	Thunder Dome	18,000
June 23	Bangkok	Thailand	Thunder Dome	18,000
June 26	Saint Petersburg	Russia	Ice Palace Saint Petersburg	—
June 29	Moscow	Russia	Megasport Sport Palace	—
July 7	London	England	SSE Arena	—
July 10	Paris	France	La Seine Musicale	—
July 20	Singapore		Singapore Indoor Stadium	—
December 18	Osaka	Japan	Osaka-jō Hall	—
December 19	Osaka	Japan	Osaka-jō Hall	—

List of 2020 concerts, with date, city, country, venue, and attendance
Date	City	Country	Venue
January 4	Fukuoka	Japan	Marine Messe Fukuoka
January 5	Fukuoka	Japan	Marine Messe Fukuoka
January 18	Niigata	Japan	Toki Messe
February 22	Tokyo	Japan	Musashino Forest Sport Plaza
February 23	Tokyo	Japan	Musashino Forest Sport Plaza
February 24	Tokyo	Japan	Musashino Forest Sport Plaza

== Personnel ==
Credits adapted from the Neo City: Seoul – The Origin photo book.

- Taeyong — artist
- Taeil — artist
- Johnny — artist
- Yuta — artist
- Doyoung — artist
- Jaehyun — artist
- Jungwoo — artist
- Mark — artist
- Haechan — artist
- Rino Nakasone — total stage producer
- Shuhei Meguri — assistant concert director
- 50 (Fifty) — assistant concert director
- Keimei — assistant concert director
- Lee Soo-man — executive producer
