= Blingy =

2026 studio album by NCT 127

Studio album by NCT 127
- Released: August 24, 2026
- Studios: SM Azure (Seoul); SM Yellow Tail (Seoul); SM Dorii (Seoul); SM Droplet (Seoul)
- Genres: Hip-hop; pop
- Length: 26:00
- Languages: Korean; English
- Labels: SM; Kakao; Virgin
- Producers: Benjmn; Daniel Roughley; Tim Tan; Ryan Jhun; Cambo; Leelee; LouAllDay; Sean Fischer; Higherbaby; David Pramik; Dwilly; Deeno; Yejune Synn; Wshd; Joowon; Jaedogi; Ido Zmishlany

NCT 127 chronology
Walk (2024)	Blingy (2026)

NCT chronology
Vision Wings (2026)	Blingy (2026)	I Spy (2026)

Singles from Blingy
- 1. "Blingy" Released: August 24, 2026

Blingy is the seventh Korean-language (eighth overall) studio album by the South Korean boy band NCT 127. It was released on August 24, 2026, by SM Entertainment through Kakao Entertainment and Virgin Music Group, along with its lead single of the same name. To support Blingy, NCT 127 will embark on their fifth concert tour, Neo City – The Redline, from September 2026.

== Background ==
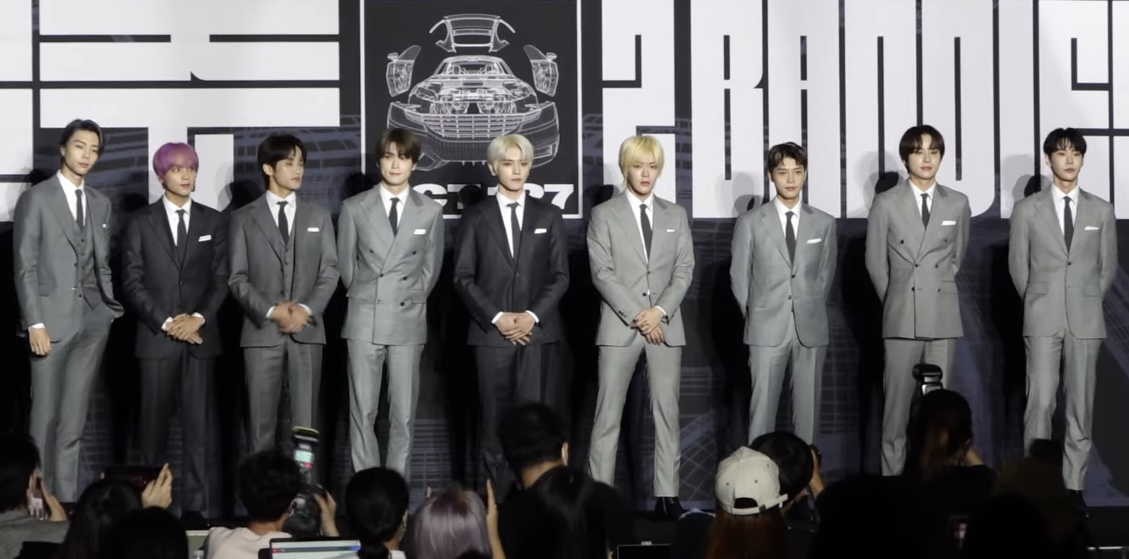
NCT 127's nine-member lineup at a launch event for 2 Baddies in 2022

The South Korean idol boy band NCT 127 debuted in July 2016 under SM Entertainment with their first single, "Fire Truck", serving as a sub-unit of NCT—a group structured around a concept of unlimited members divided in smaller sub-units that would occasionally collaborate. NCT 127's lineup initially featured Taeil, Taeyong, Yuta, Jaehyun, Winwin, Mark, and Haechan, expanded in January 2017 with the addition of Johnny and Doyoung for the launch of their second extended play, Limitless, and was completed by its final member, Jungwoo, upon the release of their first studio album, Regular-Irregular, in October 2018. That same year, Winwin became inactive with NCT 127 to join NCT's new sub-unit, WayV, leaving NCT 127 with a nine-member lineup that went on to gain recognition for hit singles such as "Cherry Bomb" (2017), "Kick It" (2020), and "Sticker" (2021). The group built a reputation as one of "K-pop's most distinct musical identities", earning praise for their experimental sounds and compositions.

In July 2024, NCT 127 released their sixth Korean-language studio album, Walk, carrying out promotional activities without Taeyong, who had been fulfilling his mandatory military service, and Taeil, who had been recovering from injuries sustained in a motorcycle accident since August 2023. The following August, SM expelled Taeil from the group following a police investigation into sexual offense allegations, while Jaehyun enlisted later in November. After concluding their fourth concert tour, Neo City – The Momentum, in May 2025, the remaining members focused on promotional activities outside the group through December, which marked Taeyong's military discharge and the enlistment of Doyoung and Jungwoo. In April 2026, ten years after his debut, Mark concluded his contract with SM and departed from NCT. That same month, the company announced that NCT 127 would release a new album and embark on a concert tour in the third quarter of 2026 in celebration of their 10th anniversary. After Jaehyun's discharge that May, it was announced in July that Johnny, Taeyong, Yuta, Doyoung, Jaehyun, Jungwoo, and Haechan had renewed their contracts with SM.

== Composition ==
"Blingy" is a hip-hop song that combines elements of rage and dubstep, featuring distorted synths, "strong" drum beats, and a chanted chorus, with lyrics likening the group to a "ceaseless", burning flame. "Legacy" is a hip-hop track blending a choir arrangement, "fast-paced" rap, and melodic singing over a rhythm led by "aggressive" drum beats and distortion bass, conveying a message of spreading positive energy across Seoul. "Piñata" mixes rock and hip-hop in the style of 2000s rap rock through electric guitar solos, a funky bassline, breakbeat-style drums, and rap chants, expressing the confidence of turning the stage into an "explosive" festival venue, likening it to smashing a piñata. "Step Up" is an old school hip-hop track characterized by a "dynamic" rhythm based on a 1990s groove about fearlessly transcending limits amidst chaos or crisis. "IKR" is a hip-hop track featuring synthesizer sounds reminiscent of arcade games that conveys an ambition to reject conventions and trust one's beliefs.

"Getaway" is an indie pop track that combines retro-style synths with funky rhythms, encouraging listeners to escape their hectic routines and embrace freedom, even if only for a single day. "Day After Day" is a hip-hop track based on hyper trap that pairs distortion bass and analog sounds with a Jersey club beat, conveying a message of moving forward authentically. The only track to feature Doyoung and Jungwoo, "127 Million Miles" is a pop rock song driven by a piano melody with an instrumental arrangement that gradually builds in intensity, capturing a promise to remain together regardless of distance. "I Mean, It's About Time" is a pop track that blends string arrangements with 1990s hip-hop drum beats, conveying a message of looking back on the group's past 10 years while continuing to move forward by relying on one another.

== Release and promotion ==
On July 27, 2026, SM opened pre-orders for NCT 127's seventh studio album, Blingy, confirming that it would be released on August 24 and stating that the project aimed to "look back on the group's journey while opening a new chapter... [reflecting] the pride, confidence and strong bond". SM also announced that NCT 127 would launch their fifth concert tour, Neo City – The Redline, shortly after with three shows at the KSPO Dome in Seoul from September 18 to 20. Due to Doyoung and Jungwoo's ongoing military service, both the album and the tour will feature a five-member lineup consisting of Johnny, Taeyong, Yuta, Jaehyun, and Haechan, except for the track "127 Million Miles". All three Seoul dates quickly sold out after tickets became available through presales on July 21 and 23, and general sales on July 24. From July 24 to August 6, the phrase "Did You Miss Us?" was displayed against NCT's trademark green background on LED billboards across Seoul, New York, Los Angeles, Beijing, Shanghai, Guangzhou, Fuzhou, Chongqing, Chengdu, Hangzhou, Xiamen, Xi'an, and Tianjin.

On July 29, SM released a schedule designed like a walkie-talkie featuring the phrase "Call 127", which illustrated the release dates for all promotional images and videos throughout August. On August 3 and 4, NCT 127 released a six-episode trailer titled "Call 127", featuring a snippet of "I Mean, It's About Time". It follows the members, who originally rose to prominence as "Seoul's troubleshooters" but had since drifted apart, as they introduce their individual characters across the first five episodes before reuniting in the finale after receiving a mysterious call. Esquire Korea interpreted it as a reference to the storyline featured in the trailers for their fifth Korean studio album, Fact Check (2023). On August 3, NCT 127 also launched a promotional website featuring behind-the-scenes photos of the trailer, utilizing a "control center" concept where fans' visits are portrayed as a "call" that brings the members back together as a team. On August 6 and 7, the group released jet squadron-themed teaser images featuring the members in gorpcore outfits against the backdrop of downtown Seoul, showcasing each member's call sign, jet design, and identification tag. The images contain references to their debut extended play, NCT #127 (2016), fourth Korean-language extended play, We Are Superhuman (2019), and third Korean-language studio album, Sticker (2021).

On August 11, NCT 127 released a music video for their track "Piñata", depicting the "Seoul's troubleshooters" evading the police, uncovering a traitor among them, and ultimately reconciling through shared memories. Further teaser images were released on August 12 and 14. The group premiered "Piñata" live during their headlining set at KCON, held at the Crypto.com Arena in Los Angeles on August 14. On August 19, they released a medley video of all the tracks and performed as special guests on America's Got Talent. A teaser for the music video of "Blingy" was released on August 21. The group will host an event at the Korea International Exhibition Center a day after the album's release.

== Media commentary ==
After the uncertainty sparked by Mark's departure, publications noted that the joint contract renewals provided the "best answer" to ensuring "the team's stability" amid various military hiatuses, which have historically represented the biggest crisis for K-pop boy bands due to member absences leading to a loss of fandom and a weakening of momentum. Journalists remarked that the group's next release would serve as a "test" of NCT 127's ability to maintain their unique artistic identity following the lineup changes, suggesting that the success or failure of Blingy would not be evaluated solely by chart performance or album sales, but rather by whether they could preserve their signature sound while establishing a new direction. Ten Asia additionally noted that the public response to a new release had been positive despite Doyoung and Jungwoo's absences, as fans appeared to have accepted the temporary arrangement for military service as a natural transitional period.

Commenting on the promotional rollout for Blingy, Newsen noted that unlike other groups who had shifted their image when facing lineup changes, NCT 127 doubled down on their identity by using "1+2+7=10" as the album's promotional slogan and reviving core symbols that have long characterized the group, such as a recolored version of the camouflage-patterned cover of NCT #127. Stating that NCT 127 "appear to have become even more solid", the publication concluded that the release aimed to prove that the "team's identity stems from the 'team itself' rather than from its individual members". Ten Asia added that the preview for "Piñata" aligned with the group's signature sound, reflecting their history of defying genre boundaries.

== Critical reception ==
Professional ratings
Review scores
Source	Rating
NME	4/5 stars

NME's Carmen Chin described Blingy as proof that NCT 127 "remain clear-eyed about who they are", adding that "the group [overcame their] challenges with previously overshadowed members like Yuta and Johnny stepping up to the plate". She praised the record's hip-hop tracks, while labeling its pop moments as "very hit and miss".

== Track listing ==
No.	Title	Lyrics	Music	Arrangement	Length
1.	"Blingy"	Wutan (Up); Jo Yoon-kyung	Benjmn; Cyrus Villanueva; Ned Houston	Benjmn	3:21
2.	"Legacy"	Sokodomo	Villanueva; Houston; Daniel Roughley; Tim Tan; Hautboi Rich	Roughley; Tan	3:00
3.	"Piñata"	Joo Hwan	Ryan Jhun; Cameron "Cambo" Bartolini; William "Leelee" Kevany; Louis "LouAllDay" Bartolini; Jack Samson; J. Que Smith	Jhun; Cambo; Leelee; LouAllDay	2:33
4.	"Step Up"	La-gom (Artiffect)	Sean Fischer; 3nrique; Josh McClelland; Kyle Reynolds	Fischer	2:40
5.	"IKR"	Ondine	David Pramik; Higherbaby; JT Roach; Alexis Lynn; K.A.A.N.	Higherbaby; Pramik	2:43
6.	"Getaway"	Lee Hyung-seok	David "Dwilly" Wilson; Arden Jones	Dwilly	3:05
7.	"Day After Day"	Jo	Deeno; Yejune Synn	Deeno; Synn	3:13
8.	"127 Million Miles"	Joowon; Jaedogi; Wshd	Jaedogi; Wshd; Joowon	Wshd; Joowon; Jaedogi	3:17
9.	"I Mean, It's About Time"	Wutan; Hwaji (Up); Johnny; Taeyong	Bea Wheeler; Jack LaFrantz; Ido Zmishlany; Whitney Phillips	Zmishlany	2:08
Total length:					26:00

=== Notes ===
- "I Mean, It's About Time" is stylized as "I mean, It's about time".

== Credits ==
=== Locations ===
- SM Azure Studio – recording (all tracks), digital editing (tracks 1, 3, 6–7, 9)
- SM Concert Hall Studio – mixing (tracks 1, 9)
- SM Yellow Tail Studio – recording, digital editing (tracks 2, 8)
- SM Blue Ocean Studio – mixing (tracks 2, 6)
- SM Dorii Studio – recording (tracks 3–4, 8), digital editing (track 4)
- SM Big Shot Studio – mixing (tracks 3–4)
- SM Droplet Studio – recording, digital editing (track 5)
- SM Blue Cup Studio – mixing (track 5)
- SM Starlight Studio – mixing (tracks 7–8)
- 821 Sound – mastering (all tracks)

=== Personnel ===
- NCT 127 – vocals
  - Yuta – background vocals (track 5)
  - Doyoung – background vocals (track 8)
  - Haechan – background vocals (tracks 4–5, 9)
- Jsong – vocal directing (tracks 1, 4)
- Joowon – background vocals (tracks 1, 4, 8), vocal directing (track 8)
- Kim Jae-yeon – recording (all tracks), digital editing (tracks 1, 3, 6–7, 9)
- Nam Koong-jin – mixing (tracks 1, 9)
- Wutan (Up) – vocal directing (track 2)
- Deeno – vocal directing (tracks 2, 7)
- Yejune Synn – vocal directing (tracks 2, 7)
- Hyun – background vocals (tracks 2, 9)
- Noh Min-ji – recording, digital editing (tracks 2, 8)
- Kim Cheol-sun – mixing (tracks 2, 6)
- Pit300 – vocal directing, background vocals (track 3)
- Jeong Jae-won – recording (tracks 3–4, 8), digital editing (track 4)
- Lee Min-kyu – mixing (tracks 3–4)
- Don Mills – vocal directing (tracks 4, 9)
- Ondine – vocal directing (tracks 5–6)
- Kim Joo-hyun – recording, digital editing (track 5)
- Jung Eui-seok – mixing (track 5)
- Swry – background vocals (track 7)
- Jeong Yoo-ra – mixing (tracks 7–8)
- Jaedogi – vocal directing (track 8)
- Kwon Nam-woo – mastering (all tracks)

== Charts ==
=== Weekly charts ===
Weekly chart performance for Blingy
Chart (2026)	Peak position
French Physical Albums (SNEP)	25
Japanese Albums (Oricon)	8
Japanese Combined Albums (Oricon)	8
Japanese Hot Albums (Billboard Japan)	7
South Korean Albums (Circle)	2
US Billboard 200	129
US World Albums (Billboard)	3

=== Monthly charts ===
Monthly chart performance for Blingy
Chart (2026)	Peak position
Japanese Albums (Oricon)	17
South Korean Albums (Circle)	4

== Release history ==
Releases for Blingy
Region	Date	Labels	Formats	Ref.
Various	August 24, 2026	SM; Kakao; Virgin	CD; digital download; streaming	
