= Awaken (NCT 127 album) =

- Digital cover

Studio album by NCT 127
- Released: April 17, 2019
- Recorded: 2016–2019
- Studios: SM Studios, Seoul, South Korea
- Genres: J-pop; hip hop; R&B
- Languages: Japanese; Korean; English
- Label: Avex Trax
- Producer: Lee Soo-man

NCT 127 chronology
Regular-Irregular (2018)	Awaken (2019)	We Are Superhuman (2019)

NCT chronology
The Vision (2019)	Awaken (2019)	Take Off (2019)

Singles from Awaken
- 1. "Touch" Released: September 16, 2018; 2. "Wakey-Wakey" Released: March 18, 2019

Awaken is the first full-length Japanese album (second overall) by South Korean boy band NCT 127, the second multi-national sub-unit of NCT. Released by their Japanese label Avex Trax on April 17, 2019, the album was the second major release for the Japanese market from the group and their first to not feature Winwin, who was on a hiatus due to his participation in WayV's promotion. SM Entertainment's founder Lee Soo-man served as the album's executive producer, with lyrical and musical composition contributed by Andreas Öberg, Sebastian Thott, David Amber, Jung Youth, Tony Esterly, Jonny Shorr, LDN Noise, Deez, Adrian Mckinnon, Mike Daley, Yoo Young-jin, Harvey Mason Jr., Dem Jointz, MEG.ME and others. A hip-hop and R&B-heavily dominant record, Awaken contains songs corporating elements from pop and electronic music, performing in Japanese, Korean and English in order to "continue" the story from their first Japanese extended play Chain (2018).

Upon its release, the album debuted at number four on the Oricon Weekly Albums chart with 53,042 copies sold in its first week of its release, as well as at number 14 on the Oricon Weekly Digital Albums chart with 978 downloads, becoming the group's third top five entry on the former chart. To promote the album, NCT 127 embarked on their first Japan concert tour, titled Neo City – The Origin. The album also spawned two singles prior to its release, namely the Japanese version of "Touch" on September 16, 2018 and "Wakey-Wakey" on March 19, 2019.

== Background and release ==
After making their debut in the Japanese market with the extended play, Chain, in 2018, NCT 127 released their first Japanese studio album, Awaken, on April 17, 2019.

It was released in fourteen versions: a limited CD+DVD edition that reverts to a regular edition once depleted, a limited CD+Blu-ray edition that reverts to a regular edition once depleted, and nine limited CD member editions that revert to a regular CD edition once depleted. All limited editions came with one trading card of nine types.

The music video teaser for the lead single, "Wakey-Wakey", was released on March 17, 2019, and the full music video was released on March 18, 2019.

== Promotion ==
It was announced in August 2018 that NCT 127 would embark on their first nationwide Japan tour, Neo City – The Origin, starting in Osaka on February 2, 2019, with a total of seven stops in Hiroshima, Kanazawa, Sapporo, Fukuoka, Nagoya, Saitama and Osaka.

== Track listing ==
Awaken
No.	Title	Lyrics	Music	Arrangement	Length
1.	"Lips"	Akira; Mark; Taeyong	Andreas Öhrn; Didrik Thott; Sam Fishman	Andreas Öhrn; Didrik Thott; Sam Fishman	3:06
2.	"Wakey-Wakey"	MEG.ME	Andreas Öberg; Sebastian Thott; Deez	Sebastian Thott	3:02
3.	"Chain"	MEG.ME	250; Albin Nordqvist	250	3:42
4.	"Regular" (English version)	Wilbart "Vedo" McCoy III; Taeyong; Mark	Mike Daley; Mitchell Owens; Wilbart "Vedo" McCoy III; George Kranz; Yoo Young-jin	Mike Daley; Mitchell Owens	3:40
5.	"Touch" (Japanese version)	MEG.ME; Jo Yoon-kyung; Kim Min-ji; Shin Jin-hye	LDN Noise; Deez; Adrian McKinnon	LDN Noise; Deez	3:10
6.	"Blow My Mind"	Junji Ishiwatari	Jonny Shorr; David Amber; Will Jay	David Amber	3:48
7.	"Limitless" (Japanese version)	Kenzie; Sara Sakurai (T's Music)	Kenzie; Harvey Mason Jr.; Patrick "J. Que" Smith; Kevin Randolph; Dewain Whitmore; Andrew Hey; Britt Burton	Kenzie	4:08
8.	"Long Slow Distance"	Natsumi Kobayashi	Lee Dae-hee (ZigZagNote); Moon Sang-sun; Sean Alexander (Avenue 52); Drew Ryan Scott	Lee Dae-hee (ZigZagNote); Moon Sang-sun	4:25
9.	"Kitchen Beat"	Ume	Ronnie Icon; Jan Baars; Rajan Muse	Ronnie Icon; Jan Baars; Rajan Muse	3:29
10.	"Cherry Bomb" (Korean version)	Taeyong; Mark; Deepflow; Lim Jung-hyo; Oh Min-joo	Dem Jointz; Jennifer Decilveo; Deez; Jakob Mihoubi (Jay & Rudy); Rudi Daouk (Jay & Rudy); Michael Woods (Rice N' Peas); Kevin White (Rice N' Peas); Andrew Bazzi (Rice N' Peas); MZMC	Dem Jointz; Deez; Yoo Young-jin	3:56
11.	"Fire Truck" (Korean version)	Taeyong; Mark; Jaehyun; Lee Seu-ran	LDN Noise; Jeremy "Tay" Jasper; Ylva Dimberg (The Kennel)	LDN Noise	2:58
12.	"End to Start"	Amon Hayashi (Digz Inc.)	Jung Youth (DMP Group); Tony Esterly (DMP Group)	DMP Group	3:30
Total length:					42:54

== Charts ==
Chart (2019)	Peak position
French Digital Albums (SNEP)	121
Japanese Albums (Oricon)	4

== Release history ==
Region	Date	Format	Distributor
Various	April 17, 2019	digital download; streaming	Avex Trax
Japan	April 17, 2019	CD; CD+DVD; CD+Blu-ray	Avex Trax
