= Highway to Heaven (disambiguation) =

Highway to Heaven is a 1984–1989 American drama TV series.

"Highway to Heaven" may also refer to:

- "Highway to Heaven" (song), a 2019 single by South Korean boy band NCT 127
- "Highway to Heaven", the nickname for a stretch of the highway Interstate 80 in Wyoming
- "It's a Highway to Heaven", a gospel song by Thomas A. Dorsey
