= NCT 127: The Lost Boys =

- NCT 127: 더 로스트 보이즈
- Written by: Jayil Pak; Lee Na-yeon
- Directed by: Jayil Pak
- Starring: Taeil; Johnny; Taeyong; Yuta; Doyoung; Jaehyun; Jungwoo; Mark; Haechan
- Country of origin: South Korea
- Original languages: Korean; English
- No. of episodes: 4

Production
- Executive producers: Cho Young-chul; Yim Pil-sung
- Producers: Yoo Hong-jun; Kim Yeong-hwan; James Shin; Park Sun-kyung; Summer Xinlei Yang
- Cinematography: Won Soon-ae
- Animators: Yi Seung-eon; Jeon Jin-gyu; Kang Min-ji; Kim Kyung-bae; Sasha Lee; Noh Gyeong-mu; Park Hyun-ji; Yoon Jin-a
- Editors: Koh Tae-min; Yoon Seul
- Running time: 34-38 minutes

Original release
- Network: Disney+; Hulu (Note: United States only)
- Release: August 30 – September 6, 2023

NCT 127: The Lost Boys (Korean: NCT 127: 더 로스트 보이즈) is a 2023 documentary series about NCT 127, a sub-unit of the South Korean boy band NCT. It was directed by Jayil Pak and executive produced by Cho Youngchul and Yim Pilsung. The documentary follows the members of NCT 127 discussing their childhoods and careers, featuring interviews, film footage, and performances from each member. It also includes footage from their 2021-2023 concert tour Neo City – The Link.

Consisting of four episodes, two episodes were released on August 30 and September 6, respectively, on the online streaming websites Disney+ (worldwide) and Hulu (United States).

== Episodes ==
No. in season	Title	Original release date
1	"Chapter 1"	August 30, 2023
Through a meta-play, Mark shows how he became a K-pop idol. Haechan talks about the challenges of transitioning into adulthood and his special relationship with his mother, who helped him nurture his dream.
2	"Chapter 2"	August 30, 2023
Yuta wants to fly freely like a butterfly. He reveals his aspirations and affection for his bandmates, who helped him adapt to unfamiliarity. Taeil, who believes he got "lucky" ever since he was given a four-leaf clover, tells the story of his past and about how his parents gave him a "lucky" life.
3	"Chapter 3"	September 6, 2023
Jaehyun shows his candid side via stand-up comedy, sharing his unusual life of traveling back and forth from the US to Korea. Doyoung talks about overcoming his dark past through singing. Jungwoo shares why laughter is important through his clown performance, and tells a story about his mother.
4	"Chapter 4"	September 6, 2023
Johnny, NCT 127's longest training member, talks about those who helped him endure his eight years of training, through an unscripted improv play. Taeyong discusses how he grew into the role of NCT 127's leader. He speaks about his sister and his dog Ruby's support, through a children's play.
