= 2 Baddies =

2022 studio album by NCT 127

- Digital cover

Studio album by NCT 127
- Released: September 16, 2022
- Genres: R&B; hip-hop
- Length: 42:22
- Language: Korean
- Label: SM
- Producers: Cutfather; Hedegaard; Aron Wyme; Imlay; Dem Jointz; Kenzie; Ryan S. Jhun; No Past No Future; Stuart Crichton; Paul Blanco; Rokman; Sean Fischer; Oneye; Johan Gustafsson; Teodor Herrgårdh; Rebecca Sjöberg; Gustav Nilsson; Jacob Attwooll; Fabian Torsson; Harry Sommerdahl; Albin Nordqvist; PhD

NCT 127 chronology
Sticker (2021)	2 Baddies (2022)	Fact Check (2023)

NCT chronology
Glitch Mode (2022)	2 Baddies (2022)	Candy (2022)

Singles from 2 Baddies
- 1. "2 Baddies" Released: September 15, 2022

Repackage edition cover
- Digital and A version cover

Singles from Ay-Yo
- 1. "Ay-Yo" Released: January 30, 2023

Professional ratings
Review scores
Source	Rating
AllMusic	4/5 stars
NME	4/5 stars

2 Baddies (Korean: 질주; RR: Jilju; lit. 'Speeding') is the fourth Korean-language studio album (fifth overall) by South Korean boy band NCT 127. It was released on September 16, 2022, by SM Entertainment, and contains 12 tracks in a variety of genres, including the lead single of the same name. The album received positive reviews from critics, who praised the versatility of the tracks that range from hip hop to R&B. On January 30, 2023, the group released a repackaged version of 2 Baddies, titled Ay-Yo, which features three new tracks, including the lead single of the same name. The album has sold a total of 3.2 million copies, becoming NCT 127's second triple million-selling album following Sticker (2021).

== Background and release ==
On August 8, 2022, NCT 127 announced that they would release a new album in September. On August 18, 2022, SM Entertainment confirmed that the release date of NCT 127's new album would be September 16. 2 Baddies was later confirmed to contain 12 tracks, including the lead single of the same name. On September 15, 2022, the music video for "2 Baddies" was pre-released. On September 16, 2022, the album was released physically and digitally worldwide.

A repackaged version of the album titled Ay-Yo was released on January 30, 2023.

== Composition ==
The opening track, "Faster", is a hip-hop dance song with strong bass and a minimal hook. The eponymous lead single, "2 Baddies", is an intense hip-hop dance song. With lyrics describing achieving success by running toward one's goal regardless of the judgment of others, the song combines vocal chants with an addictive synths. "Time Lapse" is a mid-tempo R&B song whose lyrics express feelings of longing for a lover who alternates between reality and dreams. "Crash Landing" is a UK drill-style hip-hop and R&B track depicting someone crash landing into their own love story. "Designer", a hip-hop and R&B song, describes a lover's desire to become a designer in order to make their partner look even more beautiful.

In the middle of the album is a three-part love story: "Gold Dust", "Black Cloud" and "Playback". "Gold Dust" is an emotional R&B song that features a vocoder and lyrics comparing one's feelings toward a lover to a golden ray of light. "Black Clouds" is a mid-tempo R&B song with sad vocal and guitar melodies. Its lyrics express the moment two lovers accidentally reunite in an achromatic landscape of dark clouds on a rainy day, like the protagonist of a black-and-white film. Rounding off the love story, "Playback" is an uptempo pop song with a trap beat, 808 bass and an edgy keyboard sound. Its lyrics depict a tug-of-war of the heart between the narrator's lover and his ex.

"Tasty" is a hip-hop song that instills confidence with heavy synth bass and energetic singing about killing villains in nightmares effortlessly. "Vitamin" is a 90s-style hip-hop song in which the narrator promises to be like a vitamin in another's life and stay by their side through hard times. "LOL" is a neo soul pop song with jazz guitar riffs and 808 beats that create a bright atmosphere and convey a message of comfort, support and encouragement to laugh out loud when one feels tired. The final song of the album, "1, 2, 7 (Time Stops)" is a funky 90s groove-based up-tempo pop song. The title and lyrics reference the group's name, NCT 127, and the song is dedicated to their fans with a message describing the sensation of time stopping when you are with the one you love.

== Promotion ==
2 Baddies was teased with a concept trailer titled "Gear Up", released on August 18, 2022, depicting a car with the number 127 on its hood and the album title on its roof and the group members wearing glow-in-the-dark outfits. NCT 127 held a comeback show to commemorate the album's release offline at KINTEX 7Hall and live-streamed via Beyond Live. The group held concerts in Los Angeles and New York to promote the album in North America, as part of their Neo City – The Link tour. Member Mark noted at the album release press conference that the tour setlist would be revised to include songs from 2 Baddies.

== Commercial performance ==
2 Baddies surpassed more than 1.5 million sales in its first week of release. With only 2 days of tracking the album debuted at number two on the week 38 issue of the Circle Album Chart, for the period dated September 11–17, 2022. In its debut month the album charted at number two in the monthly Circle Album Chart. The album exceeded sales of 1.8 million copies by the end of 2022, achieving the sixth position on the yearly Circle Album Chart.

In Croatia, 2 Baddies topped the Top 40 Foreign Albums Chart debuting at number one. 2 Baddies also charted in many European territories, including Belgium, Germany, France, Hungary, Portugal, Spain, Sweden, and Switzerland. 2 Baddies also entered the TOP 50 Albums Chart of the ARIA Chart, Australia's official music chart at number three, increasing 13 spots compared to their previous album Sticker.

In the United States, 2 Baddies debuted at number three of the Billboard 200 chart on the first week of release, selling a total of 58,000 units making the album their third Top 10 entry. As of January 2023, 2 Baddies has sold 148,000 copies making it the tenth most-sold 2022 CD album in the United States.

== Track listing ==
2 Baddies track listing
No.	Title	Lyrics	Music	Arrangement	Length
1.	"Faster"	Lee Song (VERY GOODS); Sahara (Joombas)	Mich Hansen; Rasmus Hedegaard; Balance	Cutfather; Hedegaard	2:50
2.	"2 Baddies" (질주; Jilju; 'Speeding')	Sokodomo; Haeil; Xinsayne	Aron Bergerwall; Louise Lindberg; Tony Ferrari; Parker James; Cazzi Opeia (Sunshine); Ellen Berg (Sunshine)	Aron Wyme; IMLAY^{[a]}	3:49
3.	"Time Lapse"	Jeong Ha-ri (Joombas); Taeyong; Mark	Dem Jointz; Young Chance	Dem Jointz	3:34
4.	"Crash Landing" (불시착; Bulsichak)	Kenzie	Kenzie; IMLAY; Junny	Kenzie; IMLAY	3:24
5.	"Designer"	Kim Jae-won; Taeyong; Mark	Corron Cole; James Bunton; Aaron Aye; Dem Jointz; Ryan S. Jhun	No Past No Future; Ryan Jhun; Dem Jointz^{[a]}	3:56
6.	"Gold Dust" (윤슬; Yunseul)	Lee Chae-young	Mozella; Nick Bradley; Stuart Crichton; Paul Blanco	Stuart Crichton; Paul Blanco	4:08
7.	"Black Clouds" (흑백 영화; Heukbaek yeonghwa; 'Black and White Film')	Oh Hyun-seon (Lalala Studio)	Rokman (The Hello Group); Lauren Dyson (The Hello Group); Sean Fischer (Honua)	Rokman; Sean Fischer	3:38
8.	"Playback"	Lee Chang-hyuk	Oneye; Andreas Öberg; Johan Gustafsson	Oneye; Johan Gustafsson	3:11
9.	"Tasty" (Hanja: 貘)	Jo Yoon-kyung	Teodor Herrgårdh; Rebecca Sjöberg; Gustav Nilsson; Moa "Cazzi Opeia" Carlebecker (Sunshine); Ellen Berg (Sunshine)	Teodor Herrgårdh; Rebecca Sjöberg; Gustav Nilsson	3:34
10.	"Vitamin"	Kim Ye-in	Jacob Attwooll; Jon Eyden; Eben	Jacob Attwooll	3:04
11.	"LOL (Laugh-Out-Loud)"	Lee Hye-yoom	Fabian Torsson; Harry Sommerdahl; Albin Nordqvist	Fabian Torsson; Harry Sommerdahl; Albin Nordqvist	3:38
12.	"1, 2, 7 (Time Stops)"	Park Seong-hee	Peter Wallevik (PhD); Daniel Davidsen (PhD); Iain James	PhD	3:36
Total length:					42:22

Ay-Yo track listing
No.	Title	Lyrics	Music	Arrangement	Length
1.	"Ay-Yo"	Kenzie	Kenzie; Dem Jointz; Tropkillaz; Adrian McKinnon; Calixte	Dem Jointz; Tropkillaz	3:41
2.	"Faster"	Lee Song (VERY GOODS); Sahara (Joombas)	Mich Hansen; Rasmus Hedegaard; Balance	Cutfather; Hedegaard	2:50
3.	"2 Baddies" (질주; Jilju; 'Speeding')	Sokodomo; Haeil; Xinsayne	Aron Bergerwall; Louise Lindberg; Tony Ferrari; Parker James; Cazzi Opeia (Sunshine); Ellen Berg (Sunshine)	Aron Wyme; IMLAY^{[a]}	3:49
4.	"Time Lapse"	Jeong Ha-ri (Joombas); Taeyong; Mark	Dem Jointz; Young Chance	Dem Jointz	3:34
5.	"DJ"	Na Jung-ah (Joombas); Taeyong; Mark	Simon Petrén; Andreas Öberg; Ninos Hanna; Rico Greene; Taeyong; Mark	Simon Petrén	3:19
6.	"Crash Landing" (불시착; Bulsichak)	Kenzie	Kenzie; IMLAY; Junny	Kenzie; IMLAY	3:24
7.	"Designer"	Kim Jae-won; Taeyong; Mark	Corron Cole; James Bunton; Aaron Aye; Dem Jointz; Ryan S. Jhun	No Past No Future; Ryan Jhun; Dem Jointz^{[a]}	3:56
8.	"Gold Dust" (윤슬; Yunseul)	Lee Chae-young	Mozella; Nick Bradley; Stuart Crichton; Paul Blanco	Stuart Crichton; Paul Blanco	4:08
9.	"Black Clouds" (흑백 영화; Heukbaek yeonghwa; 'Black and White Film')	Oh Hyun-seon (Lalala Studio)	Rokman (The Hello Group); Lauren Dyson (The Hello Group); Sean Fischer (Honua)	Rokman; Sean Fischer	3:38
10.	"Playback"	Lee Chang-hyuk	Oneye; Andreas Öberg; Johan Gustafsson	Oneye; Johan Gustafsson	3:11
11.	"Skyscraper" (Korean: 마천루; Hanja: 摩天樓; RR: Macheollu)	Ellie Suh (Joombas); Taeyong; Mark	Dem Jointz; Young Chance; Xydo; Taeyong; Mark	Dem Jointz	3:56
12.	"Tasty" (Hanja: 貘)	Jo Yoon-kyung	Teodor Herrgårdh; Rebecca Sjöberg; Gustav Nilsson; Moa "Cazzi Opeia" Carlebecker (Sunshine); Ellen Berg (Sunshine)	Teodor Herrgårdh; Rebecca Sjöberg; Gustav Nilsson	3:34
13.	"Vitamin"	Kim Ye-in	Jacob Attwooll; Jon Eyden; Eben	Jacob Attwooll	3:04
14.	"LOL (Laugh-Out-Loud)"	Lee Hye-yoom	Fabian Torsson; Harry Sommerdahl; Albin Nordqvist	Fabian Torsson; Harry Sommerdahl; Albin Nordqvist	3:38
15.	"1, 2, 7 (Time Stops)"	Park Seong-hee	Peter Wallevik (PhD); Daniel Davidsen (PhD); Iain James	PhD	3:36
Total length:					53:31

Notes

- ^{^[a]} Additional arrangement

== Charts ==
=== Weekly charts ===
Weekly chart performance for 2 Baddies and Ay-Yo
Chart (2022–2023)	Peak position	
Chart (2022–2023)	2B	AY
Australian Albums (ARIA)	3	13
Belgian Albums (Ultratop Flanders)	58	—
Belgian Albums (Ultratop Wallonia)	39	88
Croatian International Albums (HDU)	1	11
French Albums (SNEP)	127	129
German Albums (Offizielle Top 100)	65	—
Hungarian Albums (MAHASZ)	–	15
Japanese Albums (Oricon)	2	2
Japanese Combined Albums (Oricon)	2	2
Japanese Hot Albums (Billboard Japan)	2	2
Portuguese Albums (AFP)	2	2
South Korean Albums (Circle)	2	1
Spanish Albums (Promusicae)	31	—
Swedish Physical Albums (Sverigetopplistan)	17	17
Swiss Albums (Schweizer Hitparade)	77	—
UK Album Downloads (Official Charts)	76	—
US Billboard 200	3	13
US Independent Albums (Billboard)	2	2
US Indie Store Album Sales (Billboard)	11	9
US World Albums (Billboard)	1	1

=== Monthly charts ===
Monthly chart performance for 2 Baddies
Chart (2022–2023)	Peak position	
Chart (2022–2023)	2B	AY
Japanese Albums (Oricon)	3	4
South Korean Albums (Circle)	2	3

=== Year-end charts ===
Year-end chart performance for 2 Baddies
Chart (2022)	Position
Japanese Albums (Oricon)	33
Japanese Hot Albums (Billboard Japan)	26
South Korean Albums (Circle)	6
US Top Album Sales (Billboard)	59

Year-end chart performance for Ay-Yo
Chart (2023)	Position
Japanese Albums (Oricon)	80
Japanese Hot Albums (Billboard Japan)	75
South Korean Albums (Circle)	31
US Top Album Sales (Billboard)	85

== Sales and certifications ==
Sales and certifications for 2 Baddies & Ay-Yo
Region	Certification	Certified units/sales
Japan 2 Baddies	—	137,414
South Korea (KMCA) 2 Baddies	Million	2,011,337
South Korea (KMCA) Ay-Yo	Million	1,080,537
United States 2 Baddies	—	148,000

== Release history ==
Release formats for 2 Baddies
Region	Date	Format	Distributor	Ref.
Various	September 16, 2022	Digital download	SM Entertainment	
South Korea	September 16, 2022	Digital download	SM Entertainment	
South Korea	September 16, 2022	CD	SM Entertainment; Dreamus	
United States	September 16, 2022	CD		
United States	September 16, 2022	CD	SM Entertainment; Capitol	
