= Cherry Bomb (NCT 127 song) =

2017 single by NCT 127

Single by NCT 127

from the EP Cherry Bomb
- Released: June 14, 2017
- Recorded: 2017
- Studio: SM Blue Ocean Studio (Seoul); MonoTree Studio (Seoul)
- Genre: hardcore hip hop
- Length: 3:56 (original ver.); 4:21 (performance ver.)
- Label: SM; Genie
- Composers: Dwayne "Dem Jointz" Abernathy Jr.; Deez; Jennifer Decilveo; Jakob Mihoubi; Rudi Daouk; Michael Woods; Kevin White; Andrew Bazzi; MZMC
- Lyricists: Taeyong; Mark; Deepflow; Lim Jung-hyo; Oh Min-joo
- Producers: Dem Jointz; Deez

NCT 127 singles chronology
"Limitless" (2017)	"Cherry Bomb" (2017)	"Touch" (2018)

NCT singles chronology
"My First and Last" (2017)	"Cherry Bomb" (2017)	"We Young" (2017)

Music video
- "Cherry Bomb" on YouTube

"Cherry Bomb" is a song recorded by South Korean boy band NCT 127, the Seoul-based unit of boy group NCT, for their third eponymous extended play (2017) under SM Entertainment. The song was written by Jennifer Decilveo, Deepflow, Lim Jung-hyo, Oh Min-joo, Taeyong and Mark, whilst music composition was handled by numerous producers, including Dem Jointz, Deez, Michael Woods, Kevin White, Andrew Bazzi and MZMC. It has been described as a hardcore hip-hop track that contains a "colorful" composition, utilizing "complex synth and bass-infused" instrumentations. The accompanying music video premiered alongside the release of the single.

"Cherry Bomb" received generally positive reviews from music critics, who highlighted its experimental direction as well as the group's performance. The song appeared on several critics picks list and earned the group a nomination for Best Pop Song at the 15th Korean Music Awards. Commercially, it became the group's first top 50 entry on Gaon Digital Chart, and entered Billboard's World Digital Songs chart at number three, making it their third top-five entry.

== Background and release ==
After wrapping up promotion activities for their second extended play Limitless in January 2017, SM Entertainment confirmed NCT 127 was preparing for the group's comeback in June on May 25, one day after their attendance at the I Seoul U concert held in Kuala Lumpur, Malaysia. The first teaser image was then revealed at midnight (KST) on June 5, which eventually became the extended play's cover for both the physical and digital release. The title was confirmed to be "Cherry Bomb", set to be released on June 14. Following a string of individual member images and cartoon character videos on the group's official Instagram page, two video teasers were uploaded onto the official YouTube channel of their label four days prior to its premiere and worldwide release.

== Composition ==
=== Development ===
"Cherry Bomb" was composed by American producer Dem Jointz, Deez, Jennifer Decilveo, Jakob Mihoubi, Rudi Daouk, Michael Woods, Kevin White, Bazzi and MZMC, with Dem Jointz, Yoo Young-jin and Deez took part in the song's arrangement. In an interview with moonROK e-magazine, Abernathy revealed that the label's executives reached out to him earlier to work on new music for their artists. Developed from a writing session between Abernathy and fellow songwriter Decilveo, an early version of "Cherry Bomb" was among the songs that the executives "loved". He also revealed that South Korean songwriter and producer Deez co-produced the song's bridge section and added in "more colorful side" to the keys in the track, mostly via online connection. They eventually worked back and forth on the production several times before getting NCT 127 to record the track. It was Dem Jointz's third work for SM Entertainment to be officially released, and subsequently his first with the group. Recording for the track took place at SM Studio, with the label's A&R executive Chris Lee sharing the recording process for the song was "pretty extreme", having been through seventeen different versions before getting to the final version of "Cherry Bomb."

=== Music and lyrics ===
"Cherry Bomb"
"Cherry Bomb" is a hip hop track with heavily-infused bass. It is said to have "fuzzy electro-rock" influence and a few melodic interludes within the verse and the bridge section.

Described as "edgy" and "experimental", "Cherry Bomb" is a track with "complex, ominous and siren-like" synth work, and heavily infused bass. The song is said to have "fuzzy electro-rock" influence, with "chanty" chorus and a few melodic interludes within the verse and the bridge section. The song is composed in the key of F♯ minor, and set in common time at a moderate tempo of 78 beats per minute. The song also has an additional extended mix, titled "Performance version", which contains a 25-second length of an instrumental future bass breakdown after the bridge section (starting from the 2-minute and 57-second mark with a distorted "and now, the breakdown" preceded). In addition, a remix version for "Cherry Bomb" was also available, containing a different instrumental breakdown section.

Lyrically, the song sees the group proclaim to be "the biggest hit" on such "propulsive and built to be performed" stage the members swagger about, referring the thrill of it "tastes like a cherry bomb". According to producer Abernathy, the original demo lyrics were "crazy" and "super super nasty" in comparison to the Korean adapted lyrics, which was written by Jennifer Decilveo, Deepflow, Lim Jung-hyo, Oh Min-joo, fellow member Taeyong and Mark. The song also contains a lyrical reference to the popular American children's song "If You're Happy and You Know It" during the pre-chorus section. Originally recorded in Korean, an English version of "Cherry Bomb" was recorded and released on October 22, 2018, for their Apple Music-digital exclusive extended play, titled Up Next Session: NCT 127. The Korean version was later re-included in the group's first Japanese full-length album Awaken, released on April 19, 2019.

== Critical reception ==
Following its initial release, "Cherry Bomb" received generally positive reviews from music critics. Writer Jeff Benjamin from Fuse called the song "edgy" and "explosive", oozing confidence which "makes the case" for NCT 127 to be an "experimental" act. During an interview with the group, journalist Hong Dam-young described the song as "powerful hip-hop tune "with a "pulsating and brassy backing chorus". In an album review from Seoulbeats, the song is said to be a "jam-packed from top to finish" track, and while it may "sound messy and disorganised", the final result eventually worked. Writer Margaret also went on to compliment the vocals of the song, citing its consistency with the rest of the track. Writer Sarah Boumedda from The Kraze magazine commented how the song was "hard to reconcile" at first, but "begs" its listeners to repeat again after several times, highlighting certain musical section such as the bridge and "beautiful" vocal melody break. The song also went on to appear in year-end critics lists by Billboard and Idolator, landing at number seventeen and twenty-one respectively. While Billboard chose the song for its "eerie vibe", Idolator noted its "sinister" synth line and "sick" hip-hop production which made the song "one of the hottest tracks" in 2017.

Listicles
Critic/Publication	List	Rank	Ref.
Billboard	20 Best K-pop Songs of 2017	18	
Idolator	The Best K-pop Songs of 2017	25	
Melon	Top 100 K-pop Songs of All Time	89	

== Accolades ==
Awards and nominations
Year	Organization	Award	Result	Ref.
2017	Korean Music Awards	Best Pop Song	Nominated	
2017	Mnet Asian Music Awards	Best Dance Performance – Male Group	Nominated	

Music program award
Program	Date	Ref.
M Countdown	June 22, 2017	

== Commercial performance ==
In comparison to their previous two singles, "Cherry Bomb" saw a breakthrough commercial success for NCT 127 in their native country. Following its initial release, the song debuted and peaked at number forty-seven on the Gaon Digital Chart for the week of June 17, 2017. By this, the song was the group's highest-charting entry for years, being surpassed by "Kick It" in 2020 when the song rose to number twenty-one on the chart a week after its release. "Cherry Bomb" also debuted and peaked at number three on the Billboard World Digital Song Sales chart, spending a total of six charting weeks.

== Music video ==
Directed by South Korean director Oui Kim, the animation-laced music video for "Cherry Bomb" emphasizes the group's dance performance at a seemingly-abandoned construction site and factory storage, featuring motorcycle and wirework stunt. It was filmed in two days at Gyeonggi, South Korea back in May 2017, weeks before its official premiere. It was choreographed by Tony Testa, with two additional "dance practice" versions for the song uploaded onto the label's YouTube channel from June 21 to 23, 2017, a week after the release of its official music video.

== Tour and live performances ==
To coincide with the song's release, NCT 127 held their first showcase since their debut for free on June 14, where they performed the song live for the first time. The group then had their first television performance for "Cherry Bomb" and the album track "0 Mile" on M Countdown on June 15, followed by live performances on Show! Music Core and Inkigayo. The song, however, was deemed "unfit for broadcast" by KBS due to mentions of violence in their lyrics, with gory descriptions and more. The group did not perform the song for their Music Bank promotion, but instead performed "0 Mile". NCT 127 eventually earned their first M Countdown music trophy for the song, and subsequently the group's first since their debut on June 22, 2017. The group would continue to promote the song throughout 2017, having attended and performed at several year-end ceremonies including MBC's 2017 Gayo Daejejeon and 2018 Seoul Music Awards. The group also collaborated with fellow labelmate Red Velvet and producer Hitchhiker for two performances during their attendance at the 2017 Mnet Asian Music Awards, where they performed an intro containing a reversed sample from NCT U's "The 7th Sense" single and "Cherry Bomb", followed by a joint performance with Red Velvet over Hitchhiker's "10$".

NCT 127 gave their first live performances internationally at the 2017's KCON music festival in Los Angeles and New York City, respectively. The group then attended as an exclusively-invited act for the Apple Store in Williamsburg, Brooklyn on June 25, 2017, where they performed both "Cherry Bomb" and "0 Mile", along with "Limitless". With this, NCT 127 became the first K-pop act to be invited and introduced in Apple Music's "New Artist of the Week" list. The group then continued to promote the song again in 2018 during their promotion cycle for Regular-Irregular, again as the opening performance for their first headlining concert tour in the same year, titled "Neo City - The Origin", and later during their initial promotion activities for We Are Superhuman in 2019. The song continued to serve as the opening number for the group's first online live concert on May 17, 2020, titled "Beyond the Origin."

== Track listing ==
NCT #127 Cherry Bomb – The 3rd Mini Album

1. "Cherry Bomb" (original Korean version) – 3:56
2. "Cherry Bomb" (performance version) – 4:21

Up Next Session – NCT 127 (EP)

1. "Cherry Bomb" (English version) – 4:20

== Credits and personnel ==
Credits adapted from the album's liner notes.

Studio

- SM Blue Ocean Studio – recording
- MonoTree Studio – recording, digital editing
- SM Blue Cup Studio – digital editing
- SM Yellow Tail Studio – mixing
- Sterling Sound – mastering

Personnel

- SM Entertainment – executive producer
- Lee Soo-man – producer
- Kim Young-min – executive supervisor
- NCT 127 – vocals
  - Johnny – background vocals
  - Taeyong – lyrics, background vocals
  - Mark – lyrics, background vocals
- Deepflow – lyrics, vocal directing (Note: Deepflow served as a rap vocals director for the song, in addition to contribute the song lyrics.)
- Lim Jung-hyo – lyrics
- Oh Min-joo – lyrics
- Dwayne "Dem Jointz" Abernathy Jr. – producer, composition, arrangement
- Deez – producer, composition, arrangement, background vocals
- Jennifer Decilveo – composition, background vocals
- Jakob "Jay" Mihoubi – composition
- Rudi "Rudy" Daouk – composition
- Michael Woods (Rice N' Peas) – composition
- Kevin White (Rice N' Peas) – composition
- Andrew Bazzi – composition
- MZMC – composition
- Yoo Young-jin – arrangement
- Ju Chan-yang – vocal directing, background vocals
- Lee Ju-hyung – vocal directing, recording
- GDLO – vocal directing, recording, digital editing
- Ginette Claudette – background vocals
- Kim Cheol-sun – recording
- Jung Eui-seok – digital editing
- Koo Jong-pil – mixing
- Chris Gehringer – mastering

== Charts ==
Chart (2017)	Peak position
South Korea (Gaon)	47
US World Digital Song Sales (Billboard)	3

== Release history ==
Region	Date	Format	Label
South Korea	June 14, 2017 (Korean ver.)	Digital download, streaming	SM Entertainment, Genie Music
Various	June 14, 2017 (Korean ver.)	Digital download, streaming	SM Entertainment
Various	October 22, 2018 (English ver.)	Digital download, streaming	SM Entertainment, Apple Music
Japan	April 17, 2019 (Korean ver.)	Digital download, streaming	Avex Trax
