= Superhuman (NCT 127 song) =

Single by NCT 127

from the EP We Are Superhuman
- Language: Korean; English
- Released: May 24, 2019
- Recorded: March 14, 2019
- Studio: SM LVYIN Studio (Seoul); SM Big Shot Studio (Seoul); MonoTree Studio (Seoul); Jungle City Studios (New York)
- Genre: Electropop; complextro
- Length: 3:56
- Label: SM
- Songwriters: Park Sung-hee; Lee Seu-ran; JQ; Ameli; Rick Bridges; Adrian McKinnon; TAK; 1Take
- Producer: TAK

NCT 127 singles chronology
"Let's Shut Up & Dance" (2019)	"Superhuman" (2019)	"So Am I" (2019)

NCT singles chronology
"Take Off" (2019)	"Superhuman" (2019)	"So Am I" (2019)

Music video
- "Superhuman" on YouTube

Superhuman (Korean: 슈퍼휴먼) is a song recorded by South Korean boy band NCT 127, the Seoul-based sub-unit of SM Entertainment's unlimited boy band NCT. It was released on May 24, 2019, by SM Entertainment as the lead single from the group's fourth extended play, We Are Superhuman. The song's music video was one of the group's most viewed online video within 24 hours of release at the time, with 3.1 million views.

== Background and release ==
On April 18, 2019, NCT 127 released a statement on the group's official Twitter and Instagram accounts simultaneously, announcing that their fourth extended play, We Are Superhuman, would be released on May 24, 2019. The initial teaser image that was released only included nine members of the ten-member group: Taeil, Johnny, Taeyong, Yuta, Doyoung, Jaehyun, Jungwoo, Mark, and Haechan. Later that same day, it was announced that WinWin would not participate in this comeback, due to the fact that he was preparing to debut with WayV, NCT's Chinese sub-unit.

== Promotion ==
A 30-second teaser for the music video was released on May 22, 2019, and featured close up shots of all the members as well as scenes from the music video itself. The official music video was released on YouTube two days later on May 24, 2019, at 12 AM KST. The group performed the song for the first time live on April 18, 2019, as the musical guests on Good Morning America (making them only the third K-Pop group to perform on the show) and also performed it on an episode of The Late Late Show with James Corden that aired on May 14, 2019. NCT 127 started their Korean promotions for the single on May 24, 2019, on Music Bank. Additionally, they performed Superhuman on the Show! Music Core, Inkigayo, and The Show.

== Composition ==
The song was written and produced by Korean producers TAK and 1Take, known for their hard-hitting, sledgehammer synths with a glitchy electro-dance base, and LA-based composer Adrian McKinnon, who has previously written songs for other SM Entertainment artists including: SHINee, EXO, and f(x). Park Sung Hee, Lee Suran, JQ, Ameli, and Rick Bridges were responsible for the lyrics.

== Critical reception ==
According to Billboard's Tamar Herman, "Superhuman" is a "vibrant" complextro and hip hop-oriented electropop track with a powerful, declarative chorus.

MTV's Crystal Bell, describes the single as a "nu-disco song that pulsates with energy, from the isolated harmonies that open and close the track -- an old SM Entertainment flourish that groups like TVXQ, Shinhwa, and SHINee, have all employed -- to the ever-changing synths that progress with such vigor, and the deep, dirty groove that hammers into your soul. The track is shining, shimmering splendor, and the futuristic visual crackles with the same intensity."

== Chart performance ==
"Superhuman" debuted at number 117 on Gaon Digital Chart. Also, the song debuted at number 3 on the World Digital Song Sales chart, with one thousand downloads sold, becoming the group's seventh top-ten song on the chart.

== Accolades ==
Year-end lists
Critic/Publication	List	Rank	Ref.
Dazed	The 20 best K-pop songs of 2019	6	
Hypebae	The Best K-pop Songs and Music Videos of 2019	—N/a	
SBS PopAsia	Top 100 Asian pop songs of 2019	26	

Music program awards
Program	Date	Ref.
Music Bank (KBS)	June 7, 2019	
Show Champion (MBC Music)	June 12, 2019	

== Credits and personnel ==
Credits adapted from the album's liner notes.

Studio

- SM LVYIN Studio (Seoul) – recording, Pro Tools operating, digital editing, engineered for mix
- SM Big Shot Studio (Seoul) – recording
- MonoTree Studio (Seoul) – recording
- Jungle City Studios (New York) – recording
- SM Booming System (Seoul) – digital editing
- SM Concert Hall Studio (Seoul) – vocoder, mixing
- Sterling Sound (New York) – mastering

Personnel

- SM Entertainment – executive producer
- Lee Soo-man – producer
- NCT 127 – vocals
- Park Sung-hee – lyrics
- Lee Seu-ran – lyrics
- JQ – lyrics
- Ameli – lyrics
- Rick Bridges – lyrics
- TAK – producer, composition, arrangement
- Adrian McKinnon – composition, background vocals
- 1Take – composition
- Yoo Young-jin – arrangement, digital editing, music and sound supervisor
- GDLO – vocal directing, Pro Tools operating
- Byun Jang-moon – background vocals
- Lee Ji-hong – recording, Pro Tools operating, digital editing, engineered for mix
- Lee Min-kyu – recording
- Kang Sun-young – recording
- Brendan Morawski – recording
- Nam Koong-jin – vocoder, mixing
- Joe LaPorta – mastering

== Charts ==
Chart (2019)	Peak position
Japan (Japan Hot 100)	90
South Korea (Gaon)	117
South Korea (Kpop Hot 100)	13
US World Digital Songs (Billboard)	3
