= Highway to Heaven (song) =

- English version cover

Single by NCT 127

from the EP We Are Superhuman
- Released: May 14, 2019
- Genre: Pop
- Length: 3:20
- Label: SM
- Songwriters: Sean Machum; Michael Foster; Charles Anderson; Gaelen Whittemore; Wilbert "Vedo" McCoy III; danke (lalala Studio); Cho Mi-yang; Min Yeon-jae; January 8th
- Producers: Sean Machum; Gaelen Whittemore; Social House

NCT 127 singles chronology
"So Am I" (2019)	"Highway to Heaven" (2019)	"Kick It" (2020)

NCT singles chronology
"So Am I" (2019)	"Highway to Heaven" (2019)	"Boom" (2019)

Music video
- "Highway to Heaven" on YouTube

"Highway to Heaven" is a song by South Korean boy band NCT 127, the Seoul-based sub-unit of South Korean boy band NCT. It was released on May 14, 2019, by SM Entertainment, as a pre-release single 10 days before the release of the group's fourth EP, We Are Superhuman.

== Background and release ==
The song was released as a pre-release single on May 14, 2019, alongside its music video.

The English version of "Highway to Heaven" was released on July 18.

== Composition ==
According to Billboard's Tamar Herman, "Highway to Heaven" is a synth-pop ballad.

The song was written by Sean Machum, Michael Foster, Charles Anderson, Wilbart "Vedo" McCoy III, Richard Garcia, Gaelen Whittemore, danke (lalala Studio), Cho Mi-yang, Min Yeon-jae and January 8, and produced by Bochum, Whittemore and Social House, who produced Ariana Grande's "Thank U, Next" and "7 Rings".

== English version ==
The English version was released as a single on July 18 and on July 19, 2019, in South Korea.

== Credits ==
Credits adapted from the album's liner notes.

Studio

- SM SSAM Studio (Seoul) – recording
- Golden Bell Tree Sound (Seoul) – digital editing
- SM Big Shot Studio (Seoul) – engineered for mix
- SM Yellow Tail Studio (Seoul) – mixing
- Sterling Sound (New York) – mastering

Personnel

- SM Entertainment – executive producer
- Lee Soo-man – producer
- NCT 127 – vocals
  - Doyoung – background vocals
- danke (lalala Studio) – Korean lyrics
- Cho Mi-yang – Korean lyrics
- January 8th – Korean lyrics
- Min Yeon-jae – Korean lyrics
- Michael Foster (Social House) – producer, English lyrics, composition, arrangement
- Charles Anderson (Social House) – producer, English lyrics, composition, arrangement
- Gaelen Whittemore – producer, composition, arrangement
- Sean Machum – producer, composition, arrangement
- Wilbart "Vedo" McCoy III – English lyrics, composition
- Richard Garcia – arrangement
- Yoo Young-jin – arrangement, music and sound supervisor
- Deez – vocal directing
- Noh Min-ji – recording
- Hong Seong-jun – digital editing
- Lee Min-kyu – engineered for mix
- Koo Jong-pil – mixing
- Joe LaPorta – mastering

== Charts ==
Chart (2019)	Peak position
US World Digital Songs (Billboard)	5

== Accolades ==
Year-end lists
Critic/Publication	List	Rank	Ref.
Billboard	The 25 Best K-pop Songs of 2019	16	
MTV	The Best K-pop B-sides of 2019	3	
Refinery29	The 20 best K-pop songs of 2019	4	

== Release history ==
Region	Date	Format	Version	Label
South Korea	May 14, 2019	Digital download; streaming	Korean	SM; Dreamus
Various	May 14, 2019	Digital download; streaming	Korean	SM; Dreamus
United States	July 18, 2019	Digital download; streaming	English	SM; Dreamus
Various	July 18, 2019	Digital download; streaming	English	SM; Dreamus
South Korea	July 19, 2019	Digital download; streaming	English	SM; Dreamus
United States	August 6, 2019	Contemporary hit radio	English	Caroline
