= We Are Superhuman =

- Digital cover

EP by NCT 127
- Released: May 24, 2019
- Recorded: 2018–19
- Studio: SM (Seoul)
- Genres: electropop; electro-funk; R&B
- Length: 18:26
- Languages: Korean; English
- Labels: SM; Dreamus; Caroline
- Producer: Lee Soo-man

NCT 127 chronology
Awaken (2019)	We Are Superhuman (2019)	Neo City: Seoul – The Origin (2019)

NCT chronology
Take Off (2019)	We Are Superhuman (2019)	We Boom (2019)

Alternative cover
- Physical cover

Singles from We Are Superhuman
- 1. "Highway to Heaven" Released: May 14, 2019; 2. "Superhuman" Released: May 24, 2019

Professional ratings
Review scores
Source	Rating
Consequence of Sound	B+

We Are Superhuman (stylized in all caps as NCT #127 WE ARE SUPERHUMAN) is the fourth Korean extended play (fifth overall) by South Korean boy band NCT 127. Originally confirmed concurrently during the release of their first Japanese studio album Awaken earlier in April 2019, it was released on May 24, 2019 by SM Entertainment and Capitol Music Group. Adrian McKinnon, Tak, 1 Take, Social House, Vedo, Léon Paul Palmen, Jihad Rahmouni, Roel Donk, Sean Machum, Gaelen Whittemore, Michael Foster, Rykeyz, and others contributed both lyrics and production. Described as an electro-pop record with R&B influence, the extended play saw a "stylistic" shift from the unit's usual "experimental hip hop" direction to a "futuristic, funkier" approach.

Upon its release, the "genre-fusing" extended play received positive reviews from music critics for its "catchy pop and pitch-perfect production value." We Are Superhuman became the group's fourth chart-topper on the Gaon Album Chart and their second to be Platinum-certified by KMCA. It also debuted and peaked at number 11 and number 64 on the Billboard 200 and the Canadian Albums Chart, surpassing their previous achievement on the former and being their first entry on the latter chart. The extended play also made its debut on several component digital charts as well.

== Background and release ==
The song for pre-single track "Highway to Heaven" was released as a pre-release single on May 14, 2019, alongside its music video. Two singles were released for the EP, including the lead single "Superhuman" on May 24, 2019 and the second single "Highway to Heaven" on July 18, 2019. The lead single went on to achieve moderate success in their native country, being their third entry on the Gaon Digital Chart. To promote the album, the group appeared and performed on several television shows such as Good Morning America and The Late Late Show with James Corden, further embarking on their first expanded world tour Neo City – The Origin, starting from January 2019.

== Promotion ==
The band debuted "Superhuman" in a performance on Good Morning America on April 18. They are the third Korean act to appear on the program.

== Commercial performance ==
We Are Superhuman debuted at number 11 on the US Billboard 200 with 27,000 equivalent album units (with 25,000 being traditional sales), becoming NCT 127's highest-charting album in the chart; they became the second highest charting K-pop group in the chart. The EP also debuted atop the World Albums chart, becoming the group's second number one since Limitless in 2017. Meanwhile, the lead track "Superhuman" debuted at number three on the World Digital Song Sales chart, with one thousand downloads sold, becoming the group's seventh top-ten song on the chart. In Japan, the EP debuted at the sixth spot of Oricon's Weekly Digital Albums with 829 downloads. It debuted in the Weekly Albums Chart at number six with 7,265 copies a week later.

== Reception ==
PopCrush ranked it among the Best Pop Albums of 2019.

== Track listing ==
We Are Superhuman track listing
No.	Title	Lyrics	Music	Arrangement	Length
1.	"Highway to Heaven"	danke (lalala Studio); Min Yeon-jae (lalala Studio); Jeon Ji-eun (January 8th) (lalala Studio); Hwang Seon-jeong (January 8th) (lalala Studio); Kim Jeong-mi (January 8th) (lalala Studio); Cho Mi-yang (lalala Studio)	Michael Foster (Social House); Charles Anderson (Social House); Sean Machum; Gaelen Whittemore; Wilbart "Vedo" McCoy III; Richard Garcia (Audity)	Social House; Sean Machum; Gaelen Whittemore; Richard Garcia; Yoo Young-jin	3:20
2.	"Superhuman"	Park Seong-hee; Lee Seu-ran; JQ (Makeumine Works); Amelie (Makeumine Works); Rick Bridges	Adrian McKinnon; TAK; 1 Take	TAK; Yoo Young-jin	3:57
3.	"Fool" (아 깜짝이야; A kkamjjagiya; 'Oh, I'm Surprised')	Rick Bridges	Rykeyz; Britten Newbill; Wes Period; Lucky Daye	Rykeyz	2:41
4.	"Jet Lag" (시차; Sicha)	JQ (Makeumine Works); Kim Hye-jeong (Makeumine Works); Mark	Michael Foster (Social House); Charles Anderson (Social House); Sean Machum; Gaelen Whittemore; Wilbart "Vedo" McCoy III	Social House; Gaelen Whittemore; Sean Machum	3:15
5.	"Paper Plane" (종이비행기; Jongibihaenggi)	Oh Min-ju	Léon Paul Palmen; Jihad "Rock A Tune" Rahmouni (SoundG8); Roël Donk (SoundG8)	Léon Paul Palmen; SoundG8	3:44
6.	"Outro: We Are 127"		TAK	TAK	1:27
Total length:					18:26

Notes

- "Fool" and "Outro: We Are 127" are stylized in all caps.

== Charts ==
=== Weekly charts ===
Weekly chart performance for We Are Superhuman
Chart (2019)	Peak position
Australian Digital Albums (ARIA)	15
Canadian Albums (Billboard)	64
French Digital Albums (SNEP)	43
Japanese Albums (Oricon)	6
Japan Hot Albums (Billboard Japan)	23
Scottish Albums (Official Charts)	77
South Korean Albums (Gaon)	1
Spanish Albums (PROMUSICAE)	77
UK Album Downloads (Official Charts)	54
UK Physical Albums (OCC)	71
US Billboard 200	11
US Independent Albums (Billboard)	1
US World Albums (Billboard)	1

=== Year-end charts ===
Year-end chart performance for We Are Superhuman
Chart (2019)	Position
South Korean Albums (Gaon)	20
US Independent Albums (Billboard)	24
US World Albums (Billboard)	9

== Certifications and sales figures ==
Sales certifications for We Are Superhuman
Region	Certification	Certified units/sales
South Korea (KMCA)	Platinum	381,051
United States	—	25,000

== Release history ==
Release history and formats for We Are Superhuman
Region	Date	Label(s)	Format(s)
Various	May 24, 2019	SM	Digital download; streaming
United States	May 24, 2019	SM; Caroline	CD
South Korea	May 27, 2019	SM; Dreamus	CD
South Korea	May 27, 2019	SM; Dreamus	Kihno
South Korea	October 18, 2021	SM	Picture disc
United States	October 18, 2021	SM	Picture disc

== See also ==
- List of Gaon Album Chart number ones of 2019
- List of K-pop albums on the Billboard charts
