= Cherry Bomb (EP) =

EP by NCT 127
- Released: June 14, 2017
- Recorded: 2017
- Studios: SM Studios, Seoul, South Korea
- Genres: K-pop; hip hop; EDM; R&B
- Length: 24:38
- Languages: Korean; English
- Labels: SM; Genie

NCT 127 chronology
Limitless (2017)	Cherry Bomb (2017)	Chain (2018)

NCT chronology
The First (2017)	Cherry Bomb (2017)	We Young (2017)

Singles from Cherry Bomb
- 1. "Cherry Bomb" Released: June 14, 2017

Cherry Bomb is the third extended play by NCT 127, the Seoul-based sub-unit of the South Korean boy band NCT. It was released by SM Entertainment on June 14, 2017, and distributed by Genie Music. The EP includes a total of seven tracks.

The EP was a commercial success, peaking at number two on the Gaon Album Chart. It has sold over 127,642 physical copies as of December 2017.

== Background and release ==
On May 25, SM Entertainment confirmed NCT 127's comeback in June and stated that the group filmed the music video for their comeback in Gyeonggi Province.

On June 5, at midnight (KST), NCT 127's first teaser image of their comeback was released. The image features what appears to be an explosion of cherries. On the same day, the agency revealed that the EP is titled "Cherry Bomb" and is set to be released on June 14 at 18:00 (KST).

From June 7 to June 9, teaser images of individual members were released. A group image was released on June 10. The group also released cartoon characters video on their official Instagram page, also special message from the members. Subsequently, teaser clips was unveiled. The track-list was unveiled on June 11, along with a special clip of "Cherry Bomb". The EP was released on June 14. The music video for "Cherry Bomb" achieved more than three million views in 24 hours. The album's illustrations were drawn by Bang Sang-ho.

== Single ==
"Cherry Bomb" was released as the title track in conjunction with the EP on June 14. It was produced by Dem Jointz, Deez and Yoo Young-jin. The single was described as a hip hop with a "complex synth and bass-infused" track with colorful compositions that meet the members' unique rap, vocals and powerful performance. The song also samples the lyrics from the popular American children's song "If You're Happy and You Know It". The choreography of "Cherry Bomb" is by Tony Testa who choreographed NCT 127's previous single "Fire Truck". The song's "Performance Version", which has an added future bass section, is an alternate version of the song used in the group's performances as well as in the music video.

The song entered at number 37 on the Gaon Digital Chart on the chart issue dated June 11–17, 2017, with 39,006 downloads sold.

== Promotions ==
"Cherry Bomb" was deemed "unfit for broadcast" by KBS due to mentions of violence in their lyrics, gory descriptions, and more, thus the group did not perform the song on Music Bank, instead, they performed their B-side "O'Mile".

NCT 127 kickstarted their promotions with a showcase, held on June 14. There were no entrance fees charged for the showcase, as it marked the group's first showcase since its debut. The group promoted on South Korean music shows starting from June 15 where they performed "Cherry Bomb" and "0 Mile" on M Countdown.

== Commercial performance ==
Cherry Bomb's pre-orders reached 101,444 copies, exceeding NCT 127's previous EPs NCT #127 and Limitless.

Cherry Bomb debuted at number two on the Gaon Album Chart and Billboard's US World Albums, debuted at number 21 on Billboard's Top Heatseekers Albums, and number 22 on the Oricon Albums Chart. The EP entered at number two on the Gaon Album Chart for the month of June 2017, with 105,877 physical copies sold.

== Critical reception ==
Fuse TV introduced NCT 127's "Cherry Bomb" describing it as edgy and explosive, and described the song as the most sophisticated track by the group so far. The lead single, "Cherry Bomb" was chosen by Billboard and Idolator as one of the best K-pop songs of 2017.

== Track listing ==
Cherry Bomb track listing
No.	Title	Lyrics	Music	Arrangement	Length
1.	"Cherry Bomb"	Taeyong; Mark; Deepflow; Lim Jung-hyo; Oh Min-joo	Dem Jointz; Jennifer Decilveo; Deez; Jakob Mihoubi (Jay & Rudy); Rudi Daouk (Jay & Rudy); Michael Woods (Rice N' Peas); Kevin White (Rice N' Peas); Andrew Bazzi (Rice N' Peas); MZMC	Dem Jointz; Deez; Yoo Young-jin	3:56
2.	"Running 2 U"	Taeyong; Mark; JQ (Makeumine Works); Kim Jin (Makeumine Works)	Karl "KP" Powell (The Colleagues); Harrison Johnson (The Colleagues); Ryan Christian (The Colleagues); Adrian McKinnon; Jeremy "Tay" Jasper; Otha "Vakseen" Davis III; MZMC	The Colleagues	2:47
3.	"0 Mile"	Taeyong; Mark; Jo Yoon-kyung; Cho Jin-joo; Choi So-young; Park Yong-joon	Christian Fast; Julimar "J-Son" Santos; Henrik Nordenback	Christian Fast; Henrik Nordenback	3:23
4.	"Sun & Moon" (sung by Taeil, Johnny, Taeyong, Yuta, Doyoung, & Jaehyun)	Jung Joo-hee; Jeon Ji-eun (January 8th (lalala Studio)); Hwang Seon-jeong (January 8th (lalala Studio)); Kim Jeong-mi (January 8th (lalala Studio))	AFSHeeN (Nonfiction); Josh Cumbee (Nonfiction); Jai Waetford	Nonfiction	3:07
5.	"Whiplash" (sung by Jaehyun, Mark, Taeyong, Doyoung & Taeil)	Taeyong; Mark; JQ (Makeumine Works); Oneru (Makeumine Works); Xitsuh	The Stereotypes; Joseph "220" Park (Iconic Sounds); Andrew Choi; MC Meta	The Stereotypes; Joseph "220" Park (Iconic Sounds)	3:21
6.	"Summer 127"	Taeyong; Mark; $ÜN (Joombas); Bae Min-soo (Joombas); seizetheday (Joombas); CiaNo (Joombas); Kim In-hyung	Shin Hyuk (Joombas); Davey Nate (Joombas); Devin Hoffman (Dysplay); Eric Scullin (Dysplay); Jass Reyes; DK (Joombas); Chek Parren (Joombas)	Joombas	3:37
7.	"Cherry Bomb" (Performance version)	Taeyong; Mark; Deepflow; Lim Jung-hyo; Oh Min-joo	Dem Jointz; Jennifer Decilveo; Deez; Jakob Mihoubi (Jay & Rudy); Rudi Daouk (Jay & Rudy); Michael Woods (Rice N' Peas); Kevin White (Rice N' Peas); Andrew Bazzi (Rice N' Peas); MZMC	Dem Jointz; Deez; Yoo Young-jin	4:21
Total length:					24:38

== Charts ==
Chart (2017)	Peak position
Japanese Albums (Oricon)	18
South Korean Albums (Gaon)	2
US Heatseekers Albums (Billboard)	21
US World Albums (Billboard)	2

== Sales ==
Region	Sales
Japan (Oricon)	8,457
South Korea (Gaon)	127,642

== Accolades ==
=== Music program awards ===
Song	Program	Date
"Cherry Bomb"	M! Countdown (Mnet)	June 22, 2017

== Release history ==
Region	Date	Format	Label
South Korea	June 14, 2017	CD, digital download	SM Entertainment; Genie Music
Various	June 14, 2017	Digital download	SM Entertainment; Genie Music
