= 2 Baddies (song) =

- Remixes cover

Single by NCT 127

from the album 2 Baddies
- Language: Korean; English
- Released: September 16, 2022
- Studio: SM (Seoul)
- Genre: Hip hop; dance
- Length: 3:49
- Label: SM
- Composers: Aron Bergerwall; Louise Lindberg; Tony Ferrari; Parker James; Cazzi Opeia; Ellen Berg
- Lyricists: Sokodomo; Haeil; Xinsayne

NCT 127 singles chronology
"Favorite (Vampire)" (2021)	"2 Baddies" (2022)	"Ay-Yo" (2023)

NCT singles chronology
"Beatbox" (2022)	"2 Baddies" (2022)	"Candy" (2022)

Music video
- "질주 (2 Baddies)" on YouTube

"2 Baddies" (Korean: 질주; RR: Jilju; lit. 'Speeding') is a song recorded by South Korean boy band NCT 127. It was released as the lead single from their fourth studio album of the same name on September 16, 2022, by SM Entertainment. It was written by Sokodomo, Haeil, and Xinsayne, while production was handled by Aron Bergerwall, Louise Lindberg, Tony Ferrari, Parker James, Cazzi Opeia, Ellen Berg, and IMLAY. Described as an "intense hip-hop dance song", it features lyrics about achieving success by running towards one's goal regardless of the judgment of others. An accompanying music video was released a day prior.

== Background and release ==
On August 8, 2022, SM Entertainment announced that NCT 127 are preparing for their fourth studio album with a September release date. The album marks their first comeback since "Favorite (Vampire)", the title track for their Sticker repackaged album Favorite, which was released 11 months before. On August 19, 2022, it was confirmed that the album is titled "2 Baddies" and will be accompanied by a title track of the same name, with a teaser video titled "Gear Up" released on NCT 127's social media accounts. On August 22, a "timeline video" confirmed that the music video for the title track will be pre-released on September 15, one day prior to the album release. The music video teaser was released on September 13, and the official music video premiered on September 15 at 18:00 KST. "2 Baddies" was digitally released a day later on music platforms, alongside the studio album. The remixes by No Identity, Viann and Biicla were released on February 17, 2023.

== Composition ==
"2 Baddies" was produced by Aron Bergerwall, Louise Lindberg, Tony Ferrari, Parker James, Cazzi Opeia and Ellen Berg, while arrangement was helmed by Bergerwall (under the alias of Aron Wyme) and Imlay. "2 Baddies" is composed of strong vocal chants in the chorus, fast rap verses, and vocal-centered pre-choruses and bridge. SM Entertainment described the song as an "intense hip-hop dance song [that] combines vocal chants with an addictive synth", while Jeff Benjamin from Billboard describes it as "high-turbo energy."

The lyrics were written by South Korean rapper Sokodomo, Haeil, and Xinsayne. According to SM Entertainment, the lyrics describes the group's confidence and the striving for success, ignoring criticisms and judgments. Arpita Adhya from HITC describes the song as a "sassy youth anthem" and a "proud successor" of "Lemonade", NCT 127's sidetrack from their third studio album Sticker. Due to the automobile company Porsche being mentioned in the lyrics, the running chant "2 Baddies 1 Porsche" was changed to "2 Baddies 1 Squad" to be allowed for broadcast in South Korean music programs.

== Music video ==
The music video, which was filmed in a large sound stage, combines cyberpunk and trippy elements backed with bright neon colors and aesthetics. It features the members in different colorful sets, including a large LED display floor that presents patterned animation and two different skeleton models of a Porsche 911 hanging above as the members perform the choreography. A customized Porsche 911 specifically made for NCT 127 is also featured, which several members drove around with in the music video. One section of the music video also features members Taeyong, Yuta, Jungwoo, and Johnny topless and covered with luminous paint. Computer-generated imagery and animations were also utilized.

On September 15, 2022, the music video was pre-released on YouTube and gained 33 million views within the first 24 hours, breaking the record set by "Sticker" as the most-viewed NCT 127 music video on its first day. It also became the second most-viewed SM Entertainment music video in the first 24 hours of all-time.

== Live performances ==
In the United States, NCT 127 performed "2 Baddies" on Good Morning America and The Jennifer Hudson Show, becoming the first K-pop artist to have appeared on the latter.

== Accolades ==
"2 Baddies" won two music show awards, winning on Music Bank on September 30 and Show! Music Core on October 1, 2022. It received a nomination for Best Dance Performance – Male Group at the 2022 MAMA Awards.

== Track listing ==
- Digital download and streaming (iScreaM Vol. 21: 2 Baddies Remixes)
1. "2 Baddies" (No Identity remix) – 3:20
2. "2 Baddies" (Viann remix) – 4:10
3. "2 Baddies" (Biicla remix) – 2:46

== Credits and personnel ==
Credits adapted from album's liner notes.

Studio

- Recorded and digitally edited at doobdoob Studio and SM SSAM Studio
- Mixed at SM Blue Cup Studio
- Mastered at 821 Sound

Personnel

- SM Entertainment – executive producer
- Lee Soo-man – producer
- Lee Sung-soo – production director, executive supervisor
- Tak Young-jun – executive supervisor
- Yoo Young-jin – music and sound supervisor
- NCT 127 – vocals
- Oiaisle – background vocals
- Sokodomo – lyrics
- Haeil – lyrics
- Xinsayne – lyrics
- Aron Bergerwall – composition, arrangement
- Louise Lindberg – composition
- Tony Ferrari – composition
- Parker James – composition
- Cazzi Opeia – composition
- Ellen Berg – composition
- IMLAY – arrangement
- Maxx Song – vocal directing, digital editing, Pro Tools operating
- Lee Ji-hong – recording
- Kang Eun-ji – recording, digital editing
- Lee Jung-bin – recording
- Jung Eui-seok – mixing
- Jang Woo-young – digital editing
- Kwon Nam-woo – mastering

== Charts ==
=== Weekly charts ===
Weekly chart performance
Chart (2022)	Peak position
Global Excl. US (Billboard)	147
Japan Streaming (Oricon)	34
Japan Hot 100 (Billboard)	45
South Korea (Circle)	8
US Rap Digital Song Sales (Billboard)	13
US World Digital Song Sales (Billboard)	11

=== Monthly charts ===
Monthly chart performance
Chart (2022)	Peak position
South Korea (Circle)	63

== Release history ==
Release history and formats for "2 Baddies"
Region	Date	Format	Version	Label
Various	September 16, 2022	Digital download; streaming	Original	SM
Various	February 17, 2023	Digital download; streaming	Remixes	SM; ScreaM
