= Beyond Live =

Online concert streaming service

Beyond LIVE
- Online live concerts tour by SMTOWN and JYP Nation artists
- Venue: V Live platform
- Start date: April 26, 2020
- No. of shows: 91 (as of April 23, 2023)
- Producers: Beyond LIVE Corporation: (SM Entertainment; JYP Entertainment; Naver)
- Website: Official website

Beyond Live (commonly stylized as Beyond LIVE) is an online live concert streaming service and concert series by South Korean entertainment company SM Entertainment in partnership with Naver. It is a paid concert streaming service. It provides full-scaled live online concerts using technology such as augmented reality and with real-time interactions between artists and live audience enabled. On its establishment, the platform has been regarded by global media as a relevant response in substituting traditional concerts during the COVID-19 pandemic. The first live concert of the Beyond Live series was headlined by South Korean boy supergroup SuperM with the concert titled SuperM: Beyond the Future on April 26, 2020; the live concert recorded over 75,000 virtual tickets sold, playing to real-time audiences from 109 countries. In August 2020, JYP Entertainment joined with SM Entertainment to create the Beyond Live Corporation, a joint venture operating and expanding the Beyond Live platform. It was launched on December 23, 2021. Since its creation, multiple artists from SM and JYP have delivered full-length live online concerts within the Beyond Live series, and other K-pop entertainment enterprises started to produce virtual live concerts in a similar format.

== Background, technology and media reaction ==
In April 2020, South Korea's largest entertainment company SM Entertainment and South Korean Internet search platform and media corporation Naver signed a Memorandum of Understanding (MOU) with the purpose to expand the reach of concerts to a global audience. The joint effort lead to the creation of Beyond Live, a series of online live concerts. On April 20, SM Entertainment released a trailer on their official YouTube channel announcing the upcoming series of live concerts, with the first live show to be headlined by K-pop boy group SuperM. Initially, Beyond Live was scheduled with four concert dates in April and May 2020. The concerts were hosted on the V Live application and made available to audiences across the world. Subtitles in different languages were made available to the live audience. In addition to the concert livestreams, ticketholders would be able to access on-demand viewing of the concerts afterwards.

Beyond Live allows viewing of arena live concerts in which there is no in-person audience. The format and design of the concert is optimized for the online audience with the aid of technology including augmented reality (AR) technology, three-dimensional backdrop graphics, live sync camera walk, and digital communication between performers and the online audience during livestreams. Specifically, Beyond Live concerts implement augmented reality graphics . Artists can perform on a stage before "a backdrop of screens and visuals [...] directed in real-time" by camera operators personnel. Real-time communication and Q&A sessions between artists and online audience are conducted via video calls.

== Media reception ==
Global media outlets like Forbes, Rolling Stone, and ABC News have commended the platform as a viable and timely alternative to traditional in-person concerts, which were being cancelled around the world as a result of the COVID-19 pandemic, as well as ensuing rules on social distancing and restricted travels enforced in various countries. The Beyond Live concert series is also regarded as a digital innovation created to foster interactions between artists and the "technical-savvy audience." In addition, Forbes remarked that, even if the impact of the COVID-19 pandemic is to be ignored, the concert streaming service still addresses a prevalent need from international K-pop fans located across regions K-pop acts rarely travel to, highlighting that for areas outside certain countries in Asia, the Americas, Europe, and Australia, fans lack the chance for in-person concerts and would need to turn to online alternatives regardless.

On August 4, 2020, SM Entertainment and JYP Entertainment announced the launch of the Beyond Live Corporation, a joint company for virtual concerts. It was formed to grow Beyond Live into a global online concert brand by strengthening global joint business development by adding synergy between SM's content production capabilities and Naver's technology.

== Piracy concerns ==
Illegal live-streaming has been identified as a potential concern. Before the first concert in the series, the SuperM: Beyond the Future show, SM Entertainment had warned of legal actions against copyright violation streaming. However, Forbes noted it is possible that many people had attempted to stream the first live show via unofficial sources.
