= Limitless (NCT 127 EP) =

EP by NCT 127
- Released: January 6, 2017
- Recorded: 2016
- Studios: SM Studios, Seoul, South Korea
- Genres: Hip hop; R&B
- Length: 22:00
- Languages: Korean, English
- Labels: SM; KT
- Producer: Lee Soo-man

NCT 127 chronology
NCT#127 (2016)	Limitless (2017)	Cherry Bomb (2017)

NCT chronology
NCT #127 (2016)	Limitless (2017)	The First (2017)

Singles from Limitless
- 1. "Good Thing" Released: December 5, 2016; 2. "Limitless" Released: January 6, 2017

Limitless is the second EP by NCT 127, the Seoul based sub-unit of South Korean boy band NCT. It marked their first album as a nine-member group, since the addition of Doyoung and Johnny in 2016. It was released on January 6, 2017 digitally and physically on January 9, by SM Entertainment.

The EP was a commercial success topping the Gaon Album Chart and Billboard's US World Albums Chart. The EP has sold 121,109 physical copies as of December 2017. The lead single, "Limitless" was named by Dazed Digital as one of the top 20 best K-Pop songs of 2017.

== Background and release ==
On December 27, 2016, NCT 127 announced their second extended play, Limitless. It also introduced Doyoung (who had previously debuted in NCT U) and SM Rookies' Johnny as new members of NCT 127. Music video teasers were released for each member from December 27, 2016 until January 3, 2017. Two music videos of the title track "Limitless" were released on January 5. The EP was digitally released on January 7, 2017 it was physically released on January 9.

The song 'Good Thing' was released before for a collaboration with W Korea and Esteem models. Only Yuta, Taeyong, Jaehyun, Mark, and Winwin participated from NCT and the video was released on December 5, 2016.

== Promotion ==
NCT 127 had their first comeback stage on M Countdown on January 5 where they performed "Limitless" and the B-side track "Good Thing". They held their first fansign for Limitless on January 12, 8:30PM KST at Seoul Women's Plaza.

== Commercial performance ==
NCT #127 Limitless entered at number one on the Gaon Album Chart on the chart issue dated January 8–14, 2017. In the US, the EP topped Billboard's World Albums chart for the week ending January 28, 2017 and also entered at number four on Billboard's Heatseekers Album chart.

The title track, "Limitless", entered at number four on Billboard's World Digital Songs chart for the week ending January 28, 2017.

== Track listing ==
Credits adapted from Naver

Limitless track listing
No.	Title	Lyrics	Music	Arrangement	Length
1.	"Limitless" (無限的我, Wúxiàn de wǒ; 무한적아; Muhanjeoga)	Kenzie	Kenzie; Harvey Mason Jr.; Kevin Randolph; Patrick "J. Que" Smith; Britt Burton; Dewain Whitmore; Andrew Hey	Kenzie	4:07
2.	"Good Thing"	JQ (Makeumine Works); Hyun Ji-won (Makeumine Works); Taeyong; Mark	Steve Daly; Terence DeCarlo Coles	Steve Daly	3:40
3.	"Back 2 U (AM 01:27)"	Jeon Ji-eun (January 8th (lalala Studio)); Hwang Seon-jeong (January 8th (lalala Studio)); Kim Jeong-mi (January 8th (lalala Studio)); Taeyong	The Stereotypes; August Rigo; Bumzu	The Stereotypes; August Rigo; Bumzu	3:55
4.	"Heartbreaker" (롤러코스터; Rolleokoseuteo; 'Rollercoaster')	Hwang Ji-won	Coach & Sendo; Jantine Annika Heij; Cimo Fränkel; Rik Annema	Coach & Sendo	3:14
5.	"Baby Don't Like It" (나쁜 짓; Nappeun jit; 'Acting Bad', sung by Taeil, Taeyong, Doyoung, Mark & Haechan)	G.Soul; Taeyong; Mark	Jamil "Digi" Chammas; Jeremy "Tay" Jasper; Jonathan "Perky Rain" Perkins; MZMC; G.Soul; Mark	Orange Factory Music	2:39
6.	"Angel"	Kevin Oppa (mr. cho); Taeyong; Mark	Cheongdam-dong Park Geon-woo; Kevin Oppa (mr. cho)	Cheongdam-dong Park Geon-woo	4:09
Total length:					21:58

== Charts ==
Chart (2017)	Peak position
Japanese Albums (Oricon)	13
South Korean Albums (Gaon)	1
Taiwanese Albums (Five Music)	4
US Heatseekers Album (Billboard)	4
US World Albums (Billboard)	1

== Sales and certifications ==
Country	Sales
South Korea	121,109
Japan	11,179+

== Release history ==
Region	Date	Format	Label
South Korea	January 6, 2017	Digital download	SM Entertainment
Various	January 6, 2017	Digital download	SM Entertainment
South Korea	January 9, 2017	CD	SM Entertainment, KT Music
