= NCT 127 (EP) =

NCT #127
- Digital cover

EP by NCT 127
- Released: July 10, 2016
- Recorded: 2015–2016
- Studios: SM Studio, Seoul, South Korea
- Genres: Hip hop; EDM
- Length: 22:31
- Language: Korean
- Labels: SM; KT
- Producers: LDN Noise; Tay Jasper; Ylva Dimberg; Adrian McKinnon; MZMC; Chris Wahle; Andreas Öberg; Timothy 'Bos' Bullock; The Colleagues; Double Dragon

NCT 127 chronology
NCT #127 (2016)	Limitless (2017)

NCT chronology
NCT #127 (2016)	Limitless (2017)

Singles from NCT 127
- 1. "Fire Truck" Released: July 6, 2016; 2. "Switch (feat. SR15B)" Released: December 20, 2016

NCT #127 is the first extended play by NCT 127, the multi-national and Seoul-based sub unit of the unlimited boy band NCT. Following its announcement on July 1, SM Entertainment released it on July 10, 2016, with physical release on July 11, 2016. A heavily hip-hop and EDM influenced release, NCT #127 had the participation of the production team LDN Noise, Tay Jasper, Ylva Dimberg, Chris Wahle, Andreas Öberg, Timothy 'Bos' Bullock, Adrian McKinnon, MZMC, The Colleagues, Double Dragon, and others for both lyrics and production, while SM's founder, Lee Soo-man, was the EP's executive producer. With this release, NCT 127 became the first sub-unit to receive a major release. It was also the first and, currently, the only release of the group as a septet.

Onn its release, the EP was a commercial success for the unit, topping the Gaon Album Chart in the third week while being their first entry on the Billboard World Albums Chart, peaking at number two. Two singles were released to promote the EP, including the lead single "Fire Truck" and "Switch", with the former achieving minor success on the Gaon Digital Chart, barely missing out the top 100 in its first charting week.

== Background and release ==
Following the presentation and introduction of NCT by SM Entertainment's founder Lee in January 2016, the unlimited boy group then debuted NCT U, a rotational sub-unit which saw the debut of Taeil, Taeyong, Doyoung, Ten, Jaehyun and Mark on April 9 with "The 7th Sense" and "Without You" on April 10. The latter five members participated in "The 7th Sense" and "Without You" had the participation of Taeil. On June 30, 2016, it was announced that NCT would debut its second sub-unit NCT 127, a multi-national and fixed unit with the number 127 referring to the longitude of Seoul, where the unit is based. The initial line-up consisted of the four aforementioned members from the previous sub-unit NCT U, Taeil, Taeyong, Jaehyun and Mark, and three new members who were SM Rookies: Yuta, Haechan and Winwin, with the latter having appeared as a dancer for the live performance of NCT U's "The 7th Sense" during their first live performance at the 16th Music Feng Yun Bang Awards in China. The extended play was digitally released on July 10, and physically released on July 11.

== Composition ==
NCT #127 is a seven-track EP of mainly hip-hop and EDM genres. The album's lead single, "Fire Truck", was described by the label as "a perfect summer tune under the Moombahton genre" with elements from hip-hop and trap music. "Once Again" is a retro-pop track, while "Wake Up" and "Another World" showcase the group's EDM venture. The sixth track, "Mad City", is an urban hip-hop track with the participation of Taeyong, Mark and Jaehyun, The three members also had their writing credits for "Firetruck", while Taeyong and Mark had their second lyrical participation for "Mad City". The last track, "Switch", is a tropical house song performed by the members in the SM Rookies Show previously in 2015. The song, and the music video, were recorded in 2015 and it was released on December 20, 2016.

== Promotion ==
Following the announcement of their first release, the group unveiled the music video for the lead single "Fire Truck" on July 8, 2016. A day before its release, NCT 127 had its stage debu on Mnet's M! Countdown, where both "Fire Truck" and the album track "Once Again" were performed. The group then continued to promote on other television music shows, such as Music Bank, Show Champion and Inkigayo. A music video for the track "Switch" was released later in December 2016, with footage recorded in 2015 and fshowing all of the confirmed SM Rookies trainees at the time.

== Commercial performance ==
NCT #127 entered the Gaon Album Chart at number two on the chart issue dated July 16, 2016. In its third week, the EP topped the chart for one week, giving the unit its first number one on the album chart. It was the third best-selling release on the July 2016 issue of the Gaon Monthly Album Chart, having sold 60,118 copies. It was the 32nd best-selling album in 2016, with a total of 83,272 physical copies sold. The EP went on to experience several overseas successes, peaking at number two on the Billboard World Album Chart while being their first entry on the French Digital Albums Chart and Oricon Albums Chart.

== Track listing ==
NCT #127 track listing
No.	Title	Lyrics	Music	Arrangement	Length
1.	"Fire Truck" (소방차; Sobangcha)	Taeyong; Mark; Jaehyun; Lee Seu-ran	LDN Noise; Jeremy "Tay" Jasper; Ylva Dimberg (The Kennel)	LDN Noise	2:59
2.	"Once Again" (여름 방학; Yeoreum banghak; 'Summer Vacation')	Jo Yoon-kyung	Chris Wahle; Andreas Öberg	Andreas Öberg	3:10
3.	"Wake Up"	Kim In-hyung; Baek In-kyung; Cho Jin-joo	LDN Noise; Jeremy "Tay" Jasper	LDN Noise	2:57
4.	"Another World"	Kim Min-ji; Lee Seul	Timothy "BOS" Bullock; Jeremy "Tay" Jasper; Adrian McKinnon; Jamil "Digi" Chammas; Leven Kali; MZMC	Timothy "BOS" Bullock; Jeremy "Tay" Jasper	3:32
5.	"Paradise"	Jeon Ji-eun (January 8th (lalala Studio)); Hwang Seon-jeong (January 8th (lalala Studio)); Kim Jeong-mi (January 8th (lalala Studio)); Jung Joo-hee; Realmeee	Perry van de Vrede (Henry Hill); Robert Nickson (Henry Hill); G.Bliz; Karl "KP" Powell (The Colleagues); Harrison Johnson (The Colleagues); Otha "Vakseen" Davis III	The Colleagues; G.Bliz	3:27
6.	"Mad City" (sung by Taeyong, Jaehyun and Mark)	Mark; Taeyong; Double Dragon	Donald "haZEL" Sales; Double Dragon	Double Dragon	3:19
7.	"Switch" (featuring SR15B)	Jung Joo-hee; Kang Eun-jung	Jeremy "Tay" Jasper; Trey Campbell; Rosina "Soaky Siren" Russell; LDN Noise	LDN Noise	3:05
Total length:					22:31

== Charts ==
=== Weekly charts ===
Chart (2016)	Peak position
French Digital Albums (SNEP)	79
Japanese Albums (Oricon)	40
South Korean Albums (Gaon)	1
US Heatseekers Albums (Billboard)	22
US World Albums (Billboard)	2

=== Monthly charts ===
Chart (2016)	Peak position
South Korea Gaon Album Chart	3

=== Yearly-end charts ===
Chart (2016)	Peak position
South Korea Gaon Album Chart	32

== Sales and certifications ==
Chart	Amount
Gaon physical sales	88,922+
Oricon physical sales	6,235+

== Release history ==
Region	Date	Format	Label
Various	July 10, 2016	Digital download; streaming	S.M. Entertainment
South Korea	July 10, 2016	Digital download; streaming	S.M. Entertainment
South Korea	July 11, 2016	CD	S.M. Entertainment, KT Music
