= List of Babymonster live performances =

Babymonster live performances
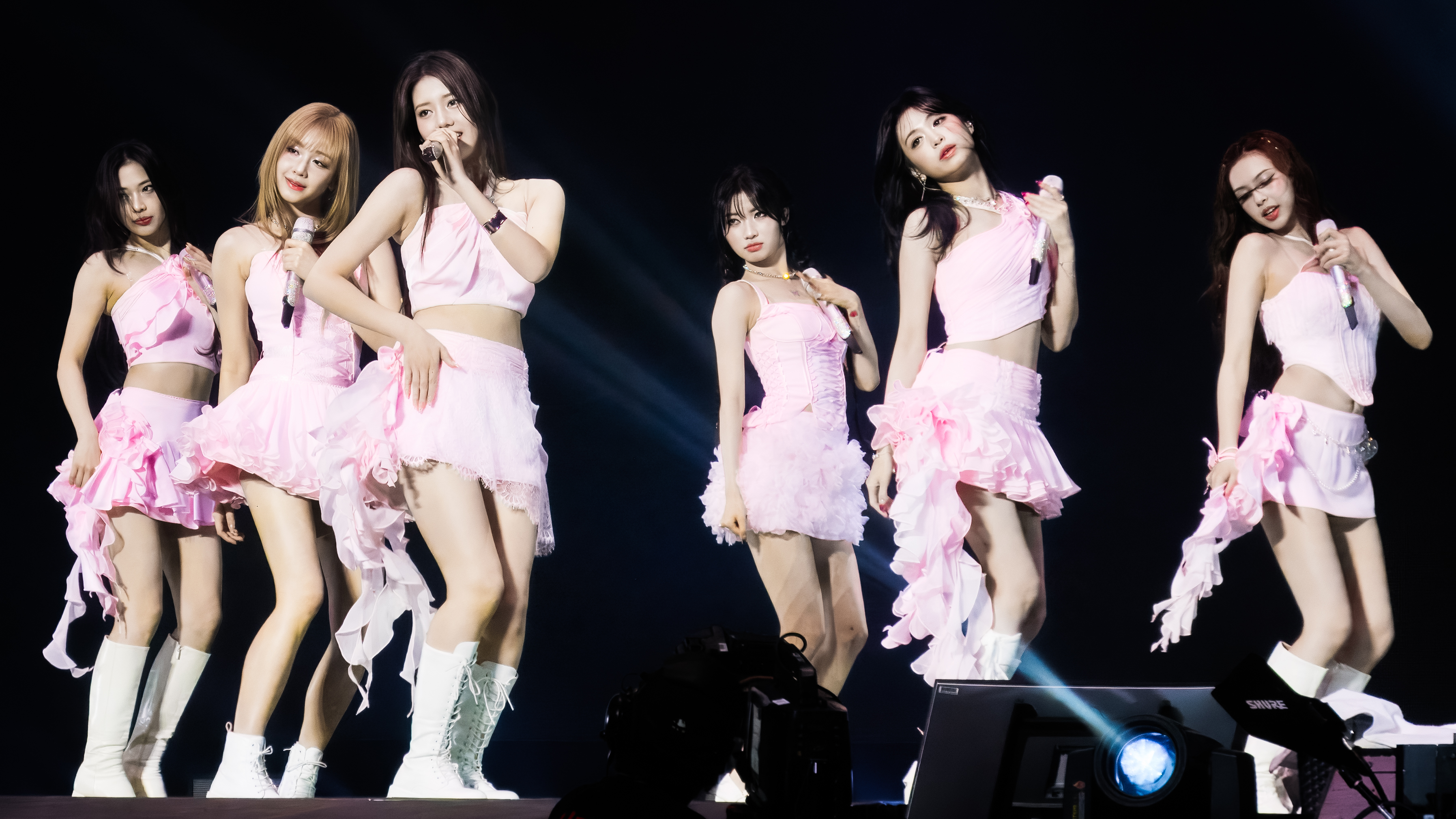
- Babymonster in 2025
- Concert tours: 2
- Fan concerts: 1
- Music festivals: 9
- Other live performances: 4
- Awards shows: 1
- Television shows and specials: 61

The following is a complete list of live performances by South Korean girl group Babymonster. The group has performed on one concert tour, as well as numerous music festivals and live performances.

After releasing their first mini album, Babymons7er (2024), Babymonster embarked on their first Asian fan meeting tour, See You There in 2024. After releasing their first full-length album, Drip (2024), they embarked on their first world tour, Hello Monsters World Tour, which took place from 2025. They also announced the Love Monsters Asia Fan Concert, with eight shows across four cities in Japan from November 15 to December 7, 2025, followed by additional dates in Bangkok on December 27–28, 2025, and Taipei on January 2–3, 2026.

On March 16, 2026, YG Entertainment announced the Choom World Tour, the group's second global tour. Scheduled to begin on, June 26, 2026, with a three-night residency at Jamsil Indoor Stadium in Seoul, the tour is expected to expand to five continents through 2027. The first leg includes 11 performances across six Japanese cities, highlighted by the group's first solo dome concerts at Kyocera Dome Osaka on September 22 and 23.

== Concert tours ==
Title	Date(s)	Associated album(s)	Location	Shows	Attendance	Ref.
Hello Monsters World Tour	January 25 – September 12, 2025	Drip; Babymons7er	Asia; North America	32	300,000	
Choom World Tour	June 26, 2026 – 2027	Choom	Asia; Europe; North America; Oceania; South America	31	—	

== Fan concerts ==
Love Monsters (2025–26)
Date	City	Country	Venue	Attendance	Ref.
November 15, 2025	Chiba	Japan	LaLa Arena Tokyo-Bay	20,000	
November 16, 2025	Chiba	Japan	LaLa Arena Tokyo-Bay	20,000	
November 22, 2025	Nagoya	Japan	IG Arena	—	
November 23, 2025	Nagoya	Japan	IG Arena	—	
December 2, 2025	Tokyo	Japan	Ariake Arena	—	
December 3, 2025	Tokyo	Japan	Ariake Arena	—	
December 6, 2025	Kobe	Japan	Glion Arena Kobe	—	
December 7, 2025	Kobe	Japan	Glion Arena Kobe	—	
December 27, 2025	Bangkok	Thailand	Impact Arena	—	
December 28, 2025	Bangkok	Thailand	Impact Arena	—	
January 2, 2026	Taipei	Taiwan	Taipei Arena	24,000	
January 3, 2026	Taipei	Taiwan	Taipei Arena	24,000	
Total				140,000	

== Music festivals ==
List of performances, showing dates, location, and relevant informations
Event	Date	Venue	City	Country	Performed song(s)	Ref.
2024 Tencent Music Entertainment Awards Indoor Music Festival	July 20, 2024	Galaxy Arena	Macau	China	"Sheesh"; "Batter Up"; "Like That"; "Forever"	
Summer Sonic Festival	August 18, 2024	Makuhari Messe	Chiba	Japan	"Sheesh"; "Batter Up"; "Stuck in the Middle"; "Like That"; "Forever"; "Stuck in the Middle" (remix)"; "Batter Up (Japanese Version / Remix)"; "Sheesh (Remix)"	
2024 Singapore Grand Prix	September 22, 2024	Marina Bay Street Circuit	Singapore		"Sheesh"; "Batter Up"; "Dream"; "Stuck in the Middle"; "Like That"; "Forever"; "Stuck in the Middle (remix)"; "Batter Up (Remix)"; "Sheesh (Remix)"	
SBS Gayo Daejeon Winter	December 25, 2024	Inspire Arena	Incheon	South Korea	"Drip"	
SBS Gayo Daejeon Summer	July 27, 2025	KINTEX 1	Goyang	South Korea	"Drip"; "Hot Sauce"; "Sheesh"	
Summer Sonic Festival	August 16, 2025	Osaka Expo 70 Memorial Park	Osaka	Japan	"Drip"; "Batter Up"; "Billionaire"; "Clik Clak"; "Sheesh"; "Hot Sauce"; "Really Like You"; "Forever"; "Batter Up (remix)"	
SBS Gayo Daejeon Winter	December 25, 2025	Inspire Arena	Incheon	South Korea	"We Go Up"; "Psycho"	
SBS Gayo Daejeon Summer	August 9, 2026	KINTEX 1	Goyang	South Korea	"Choom"; "Sugar Honey Ice Tea"; "Moon"	
Summer Sonic Festival	August 14, 2026	Zozo Marine Stadium	Chiba	Japan	"We Go Up"; "Choom"; "Moon"; "Drip"; "Forever"; "Really Like You"; "I Like It"; "Hot Sauce"; "Sugar Honey Ice Tea"; "Batter Up (remix)"; "Sheesh (remix)"	

== Live performances ==
List of miscellaneous live performances, showing event/venue names, dates, locations, and songs performed where applicable
Event	Date	City	Country	Performed song(s)	Ref.
Welcome Back Tour	October 5, 2024	Seoul	South Korea	"Sheesh"; "Batter Up"	
Welcome Back Tour	October 6, 2024	Seoul	South Korea	"Sheesh"; "Batter Up"	
Welcome Back Tour	December 13, 2024	Tokyo	Japan	"Drip"; "Sheesh"	

== Awards shows ==
List of performances, showing dates, location, and relevant informations
Event	Dates	Venue	City	Country	Performed song(s)	Ref(s)
2025 MAMA Awards	November 28, 2025	Kai Tak Stadium	Hong Kong	China	"We Go Up"; "Drip"	
2026 TMElive International Music Awards	August 22, 2026	Kai Tak Stadium	Hong Kong	China	"We Go Up"; "Choom"; "Moon"; "Drip"; "I Like It"; "Sugar Honey Ice Tea"	

== Television shows and specials ==
List of performances, showing dates, location, and relevant informations
Event	Dates	City	Country	Performed song	Ref.
SBS Inkigayo	April 7, 2024	Seoul	South Korea	"Sheesh"	
M Countdown	April 11, 2024	Seoul	South Korea	"Sheesh"	
It's Live	April 11, 2024	Seoul	South Korea	"Sheesh"	
KBS Cool FM	April 15, 2024	Seoul	South Korea	"Sheesh"	
MBC FM4U	April 16, 2024	Seoul	South Korea	"Sheesh"	
M Countdown	April 25, 2024	Seoul	South Korea	"Sheesh"	
SBS Inkigayo	April 28, 2024	Seoul	South Korea	"Sheesh"	
Music Station	May 17, 2024	Tokyo	Japan	"Sheesh"	
NHK 101 Studio	May 18, 2024	Tokyo	Japan	"Sheesh"	
CDTV Live! Live!	May 20, 2024	Tokyo	Japan	"Sheesh"	
Nihon TV	May 25, 2024	Tokyo	Japan	"Sheesh"	
Buzz Rhythm 02	May 31, 2024	Tokyo	Japan	"Sheesh"	
M Countdown	June 13, 2024	Seoul	South Korea	"Like That"	
M Countdown	June 20, 2024	Seoul	South Korea	"Like That"	
SBS Inkigayo	July 7, 2024	Seoul	South Korea	"Forever"	
It's Live	July 8, 2024	Seoul	South Korea	"Forever"	
MBC FM4U	July 10, 2024	Seoul	South Korea	"Forever"	
M Countdown	July 11, 2024	Seoul	South Korea	"Forever"	
SBS Inkigayo	November 10, 2024	Seoul	South Korea	"Clik Clak"; "Drip"	
SBS Cultwo Show	November 12, 2024	Seoul	South Korea	"Drip"; "Love In My Heart"	
Show! Music Core	November 16, 2024	Goyang	South Korea	"Drip"	
SBS Inkigayo	November 17, 2024	Seoul	South Korea	"Drip"	
Music Station	November 29, 2024	Tokyo	Japan	"Drip"	
NHK 101 Studio	November 30, 2024	Tokyo	Japan	"Drip"	
FNS Kayousai	December 11, 2024	Tokyo	Japan	"Drip"	
The First Take	December 25, 2024	Tokyo	Japan	"Drip"	
CDTV Live! Live!	December 31, 2024	Tokyo	Japan	"Drip"	
The Kelly Clarkson Show	February 27, 2025	New York City	United States	"Drip"	
Good Day New York	February 27, 2025	New York City	United States	"Drip"	
The Grammy Museum	March 3, 2025	Los Angeles	United States	"Billionaire"; "Drip"	
SBS Inkigayo	July 6, 2025	Seoul	South Korea	"Hot Sauce"	
SBS Cool FM	July 8, 2025	Seoul	South Korea	"Hot Sauce"	
M Countdown	July 10, 2025	Seoul	South Korea	"Hot Sauce"	
SBS Cultwo Show	July 13, 2025	Seoul	South Korea	"Hot Sauce"	
Show! Music Core	July 19, 2025	Seoul	South Korea	"Hot Sauce"	
MBC FM4U	July 23, 2025	Seoul	South Korea	"Hot Sauce"	
SBS Cultwo Show	October 13, 2025	Seoul	South Korea	"We Go Up"	
M Countdown	October 16, 2025	Seoul	South Korea	"We Go Up"	
It's Live	October 17, 2025	Seoul	South Korea	"We Go Up"	
Show! Music Core	October 18, 2025	Seoul	South Korea	"We Go Up"	
SBS Cool FM	October 19, 2025	Seoul	South Korea	"We Go Up"	
M Countdown	October 23, 2025	Seoul	South Korea	"We Go Up"	
SBS Inkigayo	October 26, 2025	Seoul	South Korea	"We Go Up"	
Show! Music Core	November 1, 2025	Seoul	South Korea	"We Go Up"	
SBS Inkigayo	November 2, 2025	Seoul	South Korea	"We Go Up"	
Best Hit Song Festival	November 13, 2025	Tokyo	Japan	"We Go Up"	
The First Take	November 14, 2025	Tokyo	Japan	"Sheesh"	
Buzz Rhythm 02	November 21, 2025	Tokyo	Japan	"Drip"; "We Go Up"	
M Countdown	February 5, 2026	Seoul	South Korea	"Really Like You"	
SBS Inkigayo	May 10, 2026	Seoul	South Korea	"Choom"	
MBC FM4U	May 13, 2026	Seoul	South Korea	"Choom"	
M Countdown	June 11, 2026	Seoul	South Korea	"Sugar Honey Ice Tea"	
Show! Music Core	June 12, 2026	Seoul	South Korea	"Sugar Honey Ice Tea"	
SBS Inkigayo	June 14, 2026	Seoul	South Korea	"Sugar Honey Ice Tea"	
SBS Cultwo Show	June 17, 2026	Seoul	South Korea	"Sugar Honey Ice Tea"	
M Countdown	June 18, 2026	Seoul	South Korea	"Sugar Honey Ice Tea"	
SBS Inkigayo	June 21, 2026	Seoul	South Korea	"Sugar Honey Ice Tea"	
Show! Music Core	July 11, 2026	Seoul	South Korea	"I Like It"	
SBS Inkigayo	July 12, 2026	Seoul	South Korea	"I Like It"	
M Countdown	August 6, 2026	Seoul	South Korea	"Moon"	
Show! Music Core	August 8, 2026	Seoul	South Korea	"Moon"	
