= Indonesia Arena =

Indoor multi-purpose arena in Jakarta

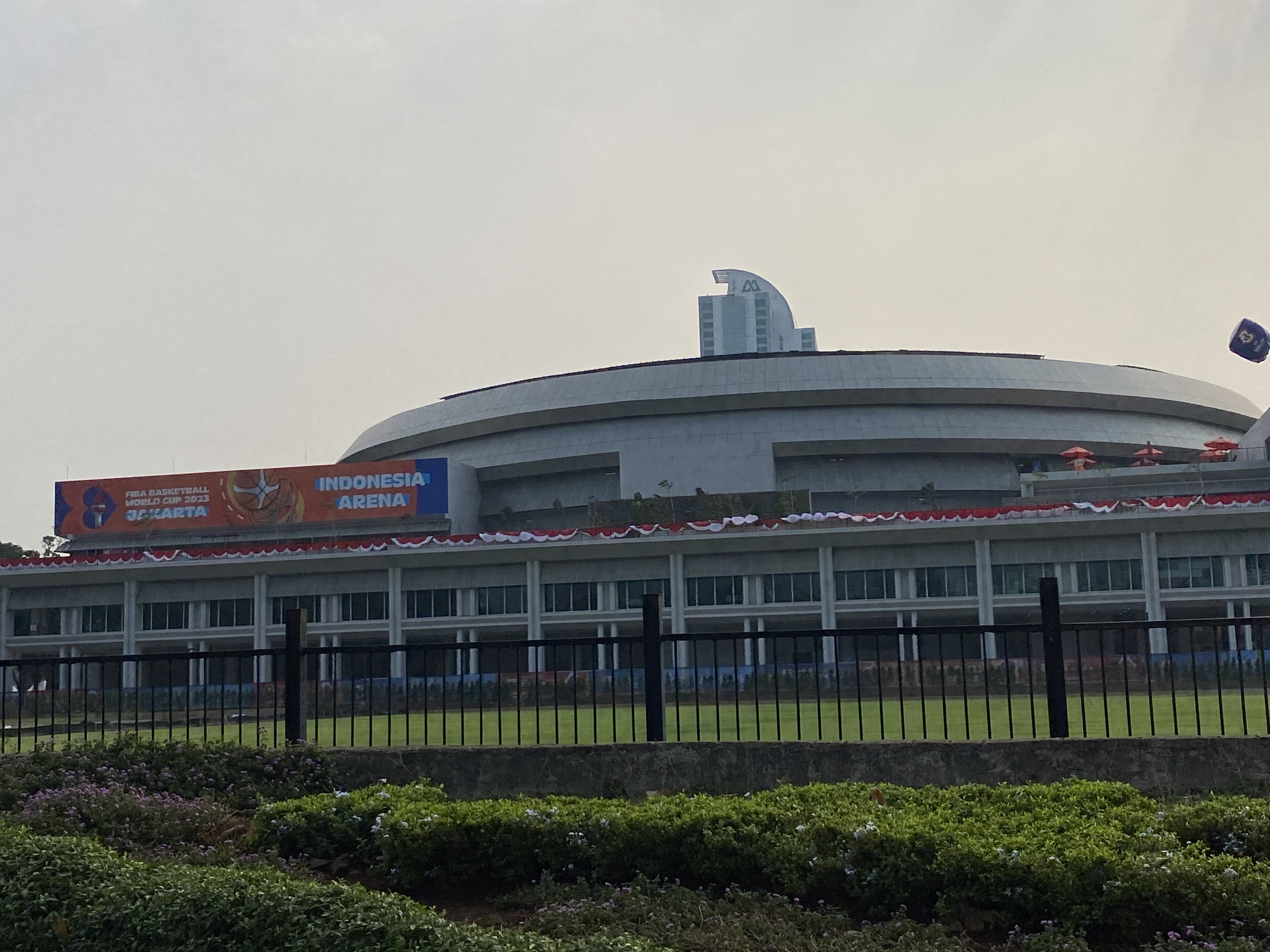
- Eastern facade of the arena, 2023
- Interactive map of Indonesia Arena
- Former names: Indoor Multifunction Sports Arena at Gelora Bung Karno (planning/construction)
- Location: Gelora, Tanah Abang, Central Jakarta, Indonesia
- Coordinates: 06°12′53″S 106°48′02″E
- Owner: Government of Indonesia (via Ministry of State Secretariat)
- Operator: Pusat Pengelolaan Komplek Gelora Bung Karno (Gelora Bung Karno Complex Management Center)
- Capacity: 16,500
- Public transit: Istora Mandiri; Palmerah; Senayan Bank Jakarta; Gerbang Pemuda

Construction
- Groundbreaking: December 2021
- Opened: 7 August 2023; 3 years ago
- Cost: USDolar 150m
- General contractors: PT Adhi Karya; PT Nindya Karya; PT Penta

Tenants
- Indonesia men's national basketball team: Major sporting events hosted; 2023 FIBA Basketball World Cup 2025 World Artistic Gymnastics Championships 2026 AFC Futsal Asian Cup

The Indonesia Arena is a multipurpose indoor arena at the Gelora Bung Karno Sports Complex in Jakarta, Indonesia. Completed in June 2023, it has a maximum seating capacity of 16,500 and served as one of the venues of the 2023 FIBA Basketball World Cup.

== History ==
Indonesia was appointed as co-hosts along with the Philippines and Japan for the 2023 FIBA Basketball World Cup. However, Indonesia needed a suitable venue with a seating capacity of at least 8,000 to meet FIBA standards. Existing venues include the Istora Senayan within the Gelora Bung Karno Sports Complex with up to 7,200 people and The BritAma Arena which can sit only 5,000 people. The government decided to construct a new indoor arena for the World Cup instead.

In a meeting between Indonesian Basketball Association (PERBASI) chairman Danny Kosasih and President Joko Widodo, the latter promised to build a new basketball venue for the World Cup while the former requested the new venue to have a capacity of around 15,000 to 20,000 seats.

Construction for the then-unnamed venue began in December 2021. The site of the new venue is on a land previously occupied by a helicopter pad at the Gelora Bung Karno Sports Complex. The Ministry of Youth and Sports announced in July 2022, that the indoor arena would be named "Indonesia Arena".

The Indonesia Arena was officially inaugurated on 7 August 2023 by President of Indonesia, Joko Widodo.

== Facilities ==
The Indonesia Arena is a multipurpose indoor arena which can be used for various indoor sports, such as basketball, badminton and volleyball, as well as non-sports activities such as concerts. It has a maximum seating capacity of 16,500 which can be reduced temporarily if needed.

== Sporting events ==
=== Basketball ===
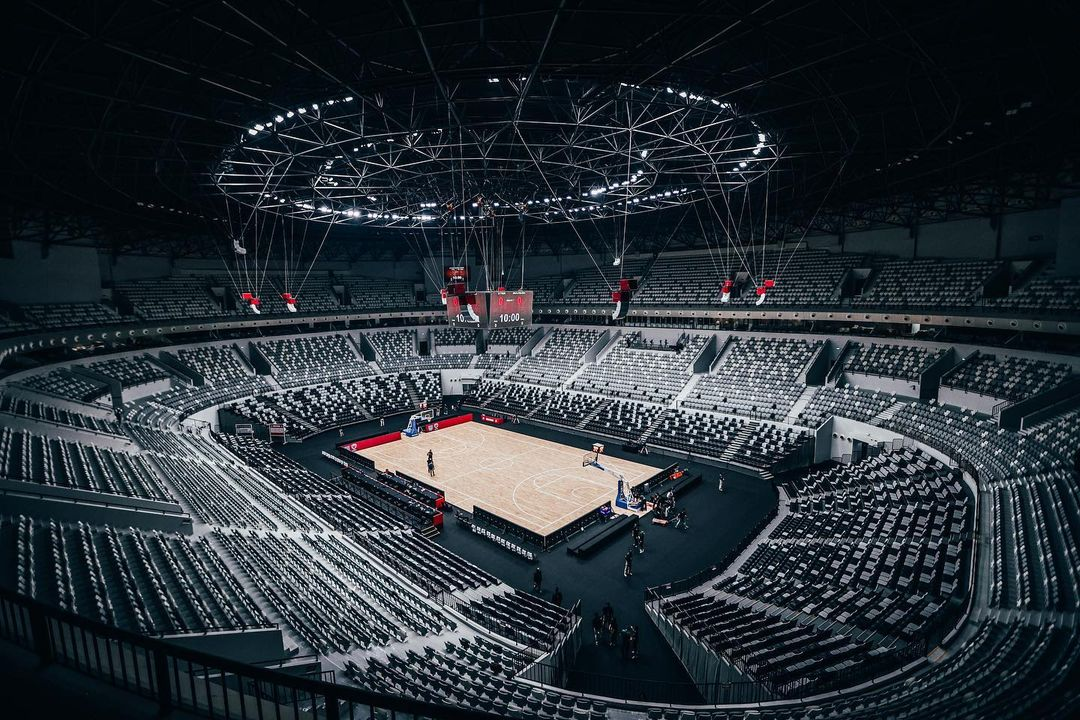
The interior of the Indonesia Arena in August 2023

The first event in the arena was a test event for the 2023 FIBA Basketball World Cup called "Indonesia International Basketball Invitational" held on 2 to 5 August 2023. Taking part in the event were Indonesia, Indonesia Patriots, Syria and United Arab Emirates. This arena is also used by the Indonesian national basketball team as their home ground in the 2025 FIBA Asia Cup qualification.

==== FIBA Basketball World Cup ====
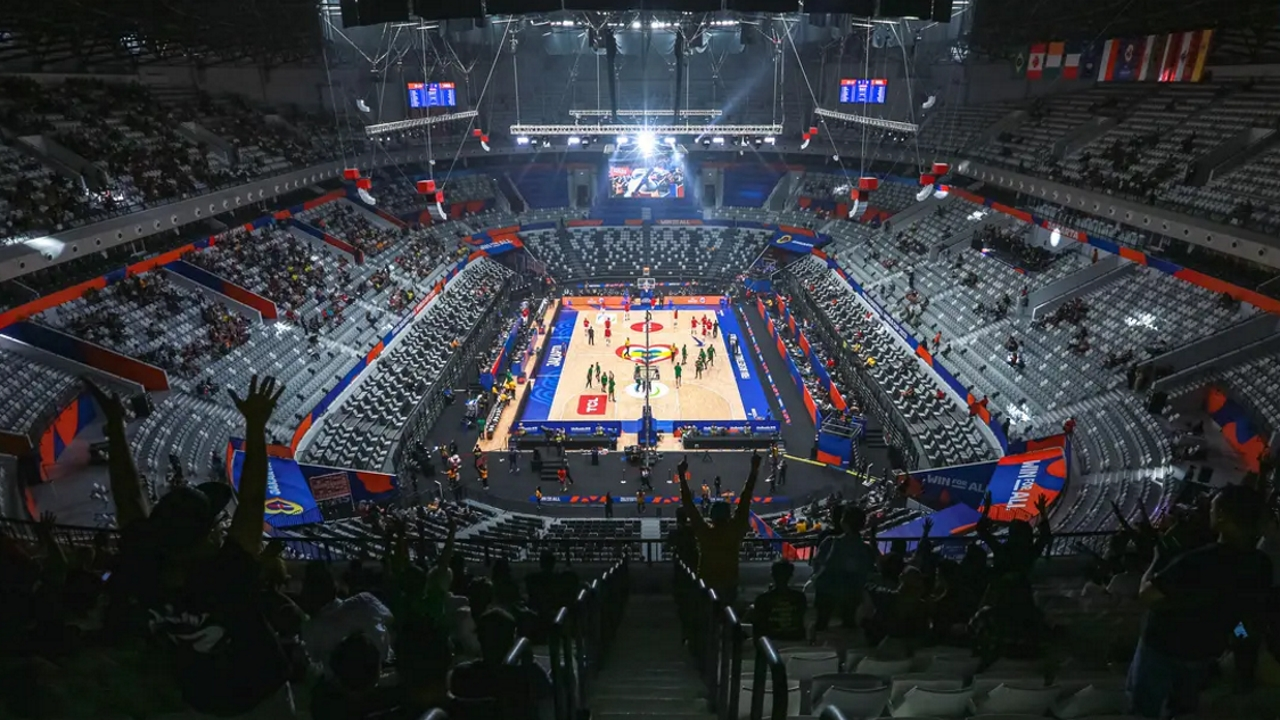
The arena during the 2023 FIBA Basketball World Cup Group G match between Iran and Brazil

Indonesia Arena was one of the host venues for the 2023 FIBA Basketball World Cup, co-hosted by Indonesia, Japan and the Philippines from 25 August to 10 September 2023. The arena hosted games of groups G and H from the first round, as well as games of groups L and P from the second round.

==== Development Basketball League ====
The arena hosted the final matches for the DKI Jakarta series of the DBL 2023, which was held on 17 November. DBL is the largest basketball league for middle school and high school students in Indonesia. It was also the first sports event in the arena after the FIBA Basketball World Cup. The final's total attendance of over 12,000 broke the record for the largest attendance in a national basketball event in Indonesia, breaking the previous record of around 8,000 set by the final of the now-defunct NBL in 2012.

=== Badminton ===
The arena was originally planned to held the BWF tournament Indonesia Open starting from 2024 tournament. however, due to venue readiness and lighting problems, the plan was scrapped, and the tournament was held at Istora instead.

=== Futsal ===
The first futsal game held at the Indonesia Arena was an exhibition match between Indonesia and Australia on 1 November 2025. Indonesia won 3-1 against Australia. In 2026, the arena hosted the 2026 AFC Futsal Asian Cup, alongside the Jakarta International Velodrome.

==== 2026 AFC Futsal Asian Cup ====
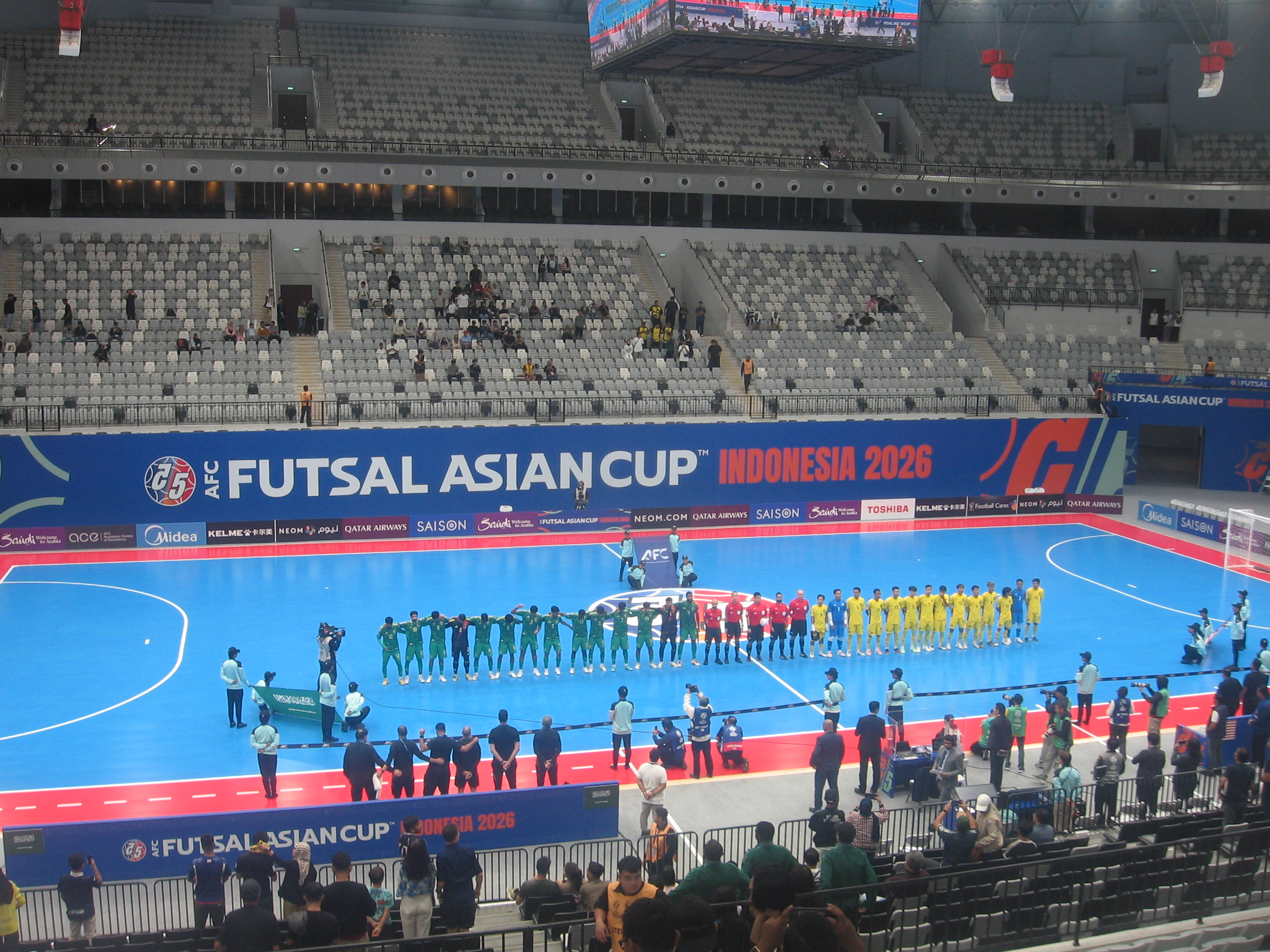
The arena during the 2026 AFC Futsal Asian Cup Group D match between Saudi Arabia and Malaysia

Date	Team #1	Result	Team #2	Round	Attendance
27 January 2026	Iraq	4–2	Kyrgyzstan	Group A	–
27 January 2026	Indonesia	5–0	South Korea	Group A	6,360
28 January 2026	Japan	6–2	Australia	Group C	–
28 January 2026	Uzbekistan	0–0	Tajikistan	Group C	–
29 January 2026	South Korea	2–3	Iraq	Group A	–
29 January 2026	Kyrgyzstan	3–5	Indonesia	Group A	6,501
30 January 2026	Australia	2–4	Uzbekistan	Group C	–
30 January 2026	Tajikistan	0–3	Japan	Group C	–
31 January 2026	Thailand	1–0	Vietnam	Group B	–
31 January 2026	Indonesia	1–1	Iraq	Group A	10,076
1 February 2026	Japan	2–1	Uzbekistan	Group C	–
1 February 2026	Saudi Arabia	6–1	Malaysia	Group D	–
3 February 2026	Thailand	2–4	Iraq	Quarter-finals	–
3 February 2026	Indonesia	3–2	Vietnam	Quarter-finals	8,411
5 February 2026	Iraq	2–4	Iran	Semi-final	–
5 February 2026	Indonesia	5–3	Japan	Semi-final	10,389
7 February 2026	Indonesia	5–5 (a.e.t) 4–5 (p)	Iran	Final	10,733

=== Gymnastics ===
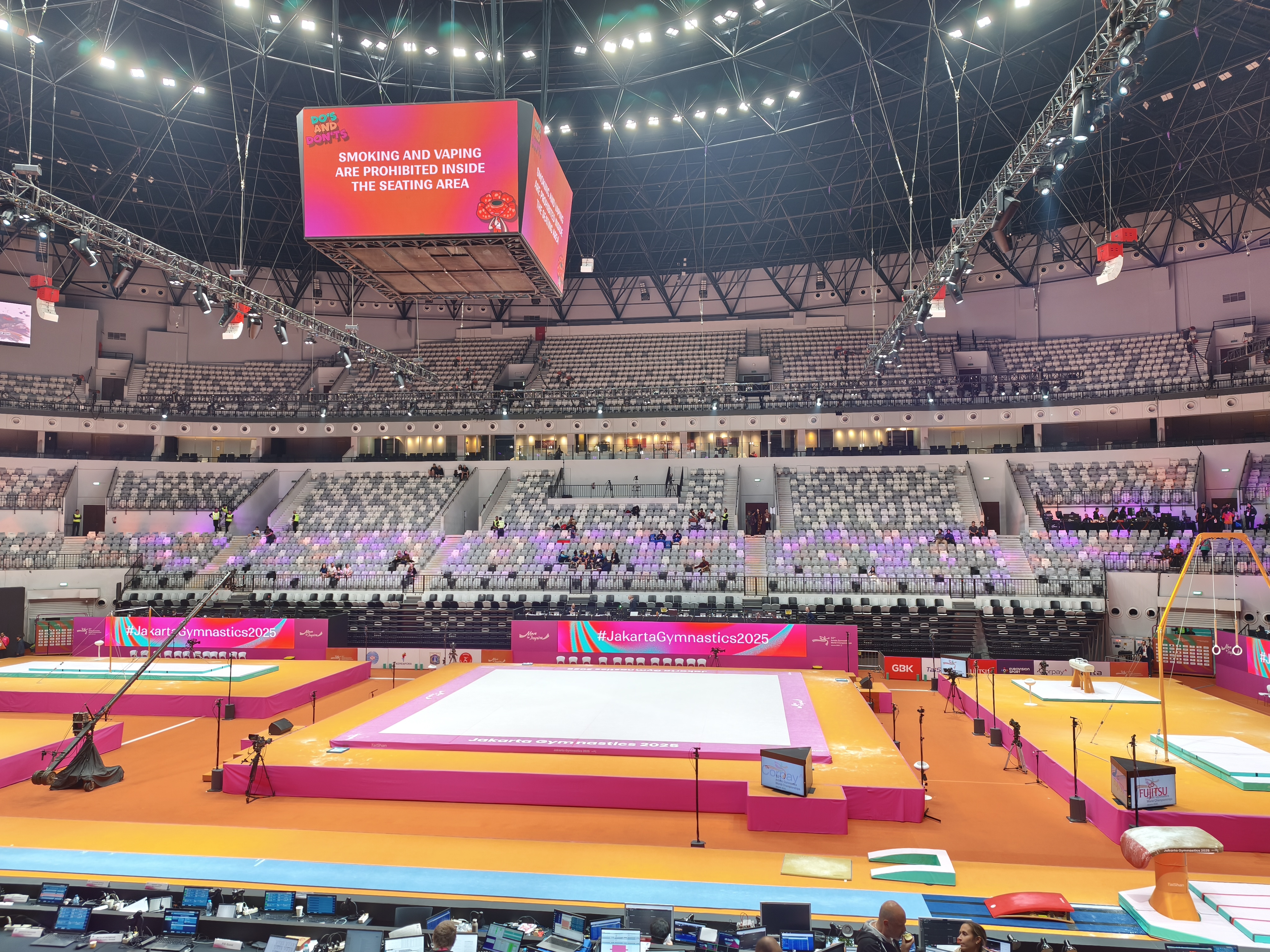
2025 World Artistic Gymnastics Championships

Indonesia Arena hosted the 53rd World Artistic Gymanstics Championships from 19–25 October 2025, with 427 athletes from 75 nations competed.

=== Volleyball ===
The first volleyball competition that took place in Indonesia Arena was an exhibition match between Red Sparks and Indonesia All Star women's volleyball teams, held on 20 April 2024, and named as Fun Volleyball 2024. Hosted and invited by the Ministry of Youth and Sports, Red Sparks won over Indonesia All Star 3–2 (25–17, 25–15, 19–25, 18–25, 15–12). Megawati Hangestri Pertiwi of Red Sparks was awarded as the MVP. Prior to the match, a competition between teams of Indonesian celebrities was held as a prelude.

== Entertainment events ==
The arena is also designed to host major concerts and entertainment shows.

Events from local artists
Events from Asian and regional artists
Events from international artists

Dates	Artists	Events	Ref.
2024
13 & 14 January	NCT 127	Neo City – The Unity	
8 June	Echosmith; The Fray	Playboox 2024: Mempertemukan Jakarta	
29 & 30 June	Treasure	Asia Tour: Reboot	
27 July	Kim Seon-ho	KIM SEONHO ASIA TOUR <Color Full>	
24 August	JJ Lin	JJ20 World Tour	
5 October	Ateez; Boy Story; BtoB; Colde; Lee Hi	City Camp 2024	
15 December	JKT48	Wonderland - JKT48 13th Anniversary Concert & Sousenkyo Announcement (Announcement of Final Results of JKT48's 26th Single Members Election)	
21 December	Stray Kids	Dominate World Tour (relocated from Gelora Bung Karno Madya Stadium)	
2025
17 January	Krisdayanti; Ruth Sahanaya; Titi DJ; Lyodra; Tiara Andini; Ziva Magnolya	Konser Super Diva	
15 & 16 February	NCT 127	Neo City – The Momentum	
12 April	Taeyeon	The Tense	
3 & 4 May	J-Hope	Hope on the Stage Tour	
25 May	Rossa	Rossa Here I Am Concert	
25 & 26 July	G-Dragon	Übermensch World Tour	
2 August	Chen; Lyn; Kim Bum-soo; K.Will; Soyou; Heize; Lee Mu-jin	KOSTCON 2025 Tour - Korean Ost. Concert 2025 Tour	
9 August	D.O.	Doo Kyung Soo Asia Concert Tour <Do It!>	
2026
25 & 26 April	Treasure	Pulse On	
16 May	One Ok Rock	ONE OK ROCK “DETOX” ASIA TOUR 2026	
28, 29 & 30 May	F4; Ashin	F✦FOREVER City of Stars Concert Tour	
6 & 7 June	Exo	Exo Planet 6 – Exhorizon	
20 June	Cortis; Mahalini; Rizky Febian; Nassar; Juicy Luicy; Agak Laen; Naykilla; Tenxi; NPD	Allo Bank Festival 2026	
3 October	NCT 127	Neo City – The Redline	
17 October	Babymonster	BABYMONSTER 2026-2027 CHOOM WORLD TOUR IN JAKARTA	
29 & 30 October	LANY	soft world tour	
14 November & 6 December	5 Seconds of Summer	Everyone's a Star! World Tour	
9 December	Boyz II Men; Dewa 19; Ari Lasso; Virzha	Boyz II Men + Dewa 19 Feat. Ari Lasso & Virzha Live in Jakarta	
2027
3 April	The Script	Man In The Arena Tour 2027	

== Other events ==
Note: (Note: Political campaigns and religion events)

- Host of the campaign in the 2024 Indonesian presidential election with Prabowo Subianto and Gibran Rakabuming Raka
- Host of the National Christmas Celebration to be held in 2024
