= Today... is the Day Tour =

2024–2025 concert tour by Andy Lau

Today… is the Day Tour
- Tour by Andy Lau
- Associated album: Various
- Start date: July 5, 2024
- End date: January 10, 2025
- No. of shows: 72

Andy Lau concert chronology
- My Love World Tour (2018–20); Today… is the Day Tour (2024–25)

Today… is the Day Tour (Chinese: 今天… is the Day) was a concert tour by Hong Kong recording artist Andy Lau. The tour began on July 5, 2024, at the Mercedes-Benz Arena in Shanghai, China, and concluded on January 10, 2025, at the Hong Kong Coliseum in Hong Kong, China.

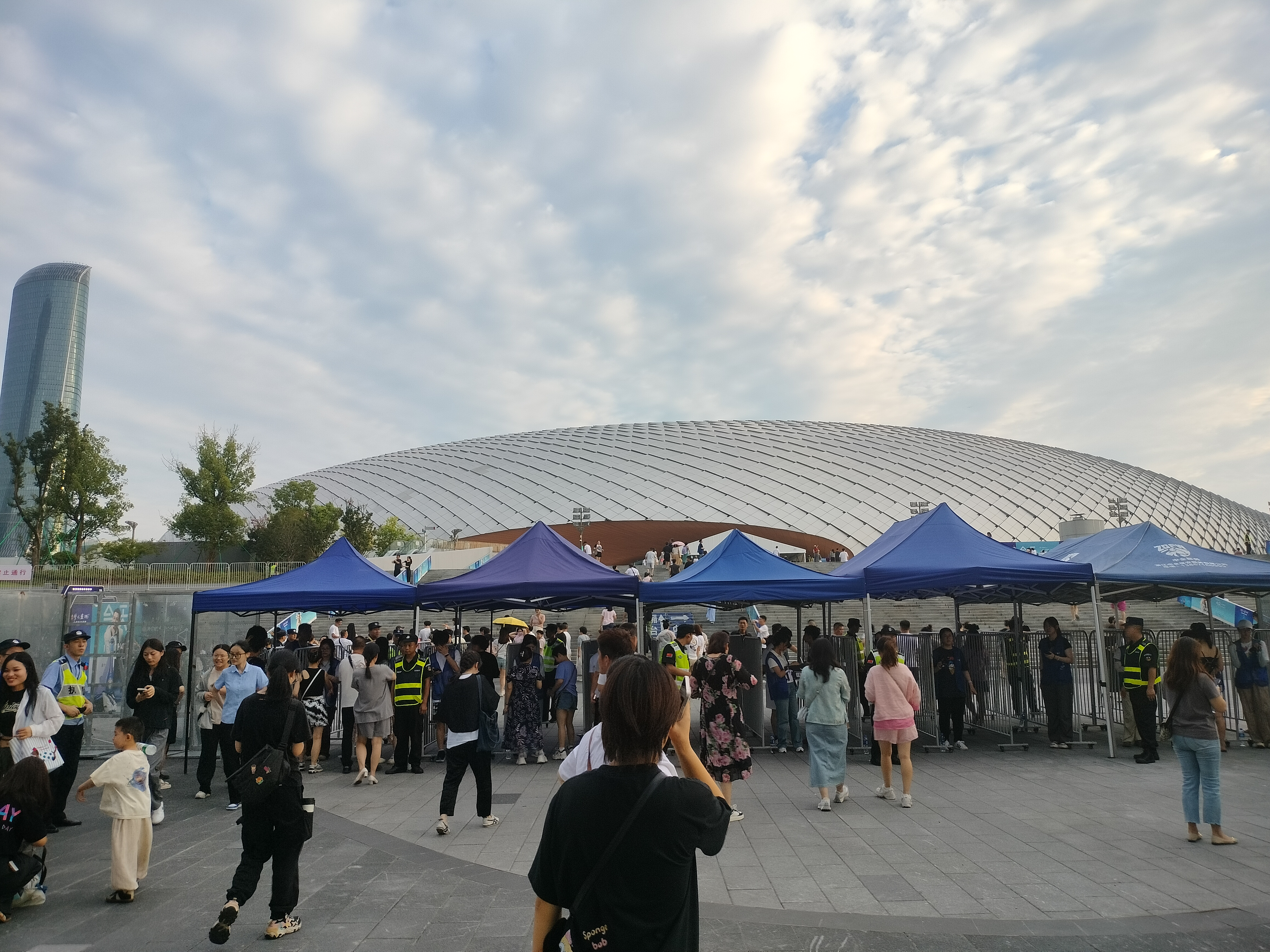
Venue in Hangzhou prior to Lau's concert

== Commercial performance ==
In Beijing, over 1.2 million users were recorded applying for concert tickets. In Chengdu, Sichuan, Lau's concerts attracted 52,000 people and generated ¥79 million (US$10.8 million) in revenue. The concerts additionally brought ¥540 million ($74 million) in tourism revenue to the city. In Taiwan, over 840,000 users were recorded applying for concert tickets for the Taipei Arena in November 2024, resulting in all 40,000 tickets selling out. All tickets for the 20 shows at the Hong Kong Coliseum were sold out in 75 minutes.

From July to September, the tour attracted around 360,000 people across 36 shows.

== Tour dates ==
List of concert dates
Date	City	Country	Venue	Attendance
July 5, 2024	Shanghai	China	Mercedes-Benz Arena	—
July 6, 2024	Shanghai	China	Mercedes-Benz Arena	—
July 7, 2024	Shanghai	China	Mercedes-Benz Arena	—
July 11, 2024	Shanghai	China	Mercedes-Benz Arena	—
July 12, 2024	Shanghai	China	Mercedes-Benz Arena	—
July 13, 2024	Shanghai	China	Mercedes-Benz Arena	—
July 18, 2024	Guangzhou	China	Guangzhou International Sports Arena	—
July 19, 2024	Guangzhou	China	Guangzhou International Sports Arena	—
July 20, 2024	Guangzhou	China	Guangzhou International Sports Arena	—
July 21, 2024	Guangzhou	China	Guangzhou International Sports Arena	—
July 25, 2024	Beijing	China	Wukesong Arena	40,000
July 26, 2024	Beijing	China	Wukesong Arena	40,000
July 27, 2024	Beijing	China	Wukesong Arena	40,000
July 28, 2024	Beijing	China	Wukesong Arena	40,000
August 2, 2024	Nanjing	China	Nanjing Youth Olympic Sports Park Stadium	—
August 3, 2024	Nanjing	China	Nanjing Youth Olympic Sports Park Stadium	—
August 4, 2024	Nanjing	China	Nanjing Youth Olympic Sports Park Stadium	—
August 5, 2024	Nanjing	China	Nanjing Youth Olympic Sports Park Stadium	—
August 9, 2024	Chengdu	China	Dong'an Lake Sports Park Arena	52,000
August 10, 2024	Chengdu	China	Dong'an Lake Sports Park Arena	52,000
August 11, 2024	Chengdu	China	Dong'an Lake Sports Park Arena	52,000
August 12, 2024	Chengdu	China	Dong'an Lake Sports Park Arena	52,000
August 16, 2024	Hangzhou	China	Hangzhou Olympic Sports Center Gymnasium	—
August 17, 2024	Hangzhou	China	Hangzhou Olympic Sports Center Gymnasium	—
August 18, 2024	Hangzhou	China	Hangzhou Olympic Sports Center Gymnasium	—
August 22, 2024	Hangzhou	China	Hangzhou Olympic Sports Center Gymnasium	—
August 23, 2024	Hangzhou	China	Hangzhou Olympic Sports Center Gymnasium	—
August 24, 2024	Hangzhou	China	Hangzhou Olympic Sports Center Gymnasium	—
August 30, 2024	Chongqing	China	Huaxi Live Yudong Center	—
August 31, 2024	Chongqing	China	Huaxi Live Yudong Center	—
September 1, 2024	Chongqing	China	Huaxi Live Yudong Center	—
September 2, 2024	Chongqing	China	Huaxi Live Yudong Center	—
September 6, 2024	Shenzhen	China	Shenzhen Universiade Center Stadium	—
September 7, 2024	Shenzhen	China	Shenzhen Universiade Center Stadium	—
September 8, 2024	Shenzhen	China	Shenzhen Universiade Center Stadium	—
September 9, 2024	Shenzhen	China	Shenzhen Universiade Center Stadium	—
October 3, 2024	Macau	China	Galaxy Arena	40,000
October 4, 2024	Macau	China	Galaxy Arena	40,000
October 5, 2024	Macau	China	Galaxy Arena	40,000
October 6, 2024	Macau	China	Galaxy Arena	40,000
October 10, 2024	Singapore		Singapore Indoor Stadium	32,000
October 11, 2024	Singapore		Singapore Indoor Stadium	32,000
October 12, 2024	Singapore		Singapore Indoor Stadium	32,000
October 13, 2024	Singapore		Singapore Indoor Stadium	32,000
October 24, 2024	Kuala Lumpur	Malaysia	Axiata Arena	40,000
October 25, 2024	Kuala Lumpur	Malaysia	Axiata Arena	40,000
October 26, 2024	Kuala Lumpur	Malaysia	Axiata Arena	40,000
October 27, 2024	Kuala Lumpur	Malaysia	Axiata Arena	40,000
November 1, 2024	Taipei	Taiwan	Taipei Arena	30,000
November 2, 2024	Taipei	Taiwan	Taipei Arena	30,000
November 3, 2024	Taipei	Taiwan	Taipei Arena	30,000
December 17, 2024	Hong Kong	China	Hong Kong Coliseum	—
December 18, 2024	Hong Kong	China	Hong Kong Coliseum	—
December 19, 2024	Hong Kong	China	Hong Kong Coliseum	—
December 21, 2024	Hong Kong	China	Hong Kong Coliseum	—
December 22, 2024	Hong Kong	China	Hong Kong Coliseum	—
December 24, 2024	Hong Kong	China	Hong Kong Coliseum	—
December 25, 2024	Hong Kong	China	Hong Kong Coliseum	—
December 26, 2024	Hong Kong	China	Hong Kong Coliseum	—
December 27, 2024	Hong Kong	China	Hong Kong Coliseum	—
December 29, 2024	Hong Kong	China	Hong Kong Coliseum	—
December 30, 2024	Hong Kong	China	Hong Kong Coliseum	—
December 31, 2024	Hong Kong	China	Hong Kong Coliseum	—
January 1, 2025	Hong Kong	China	Hong Kong Coliseum	—
January 3, 2025	Hong Kong	China	Hong Kong Coliseum	—
January 4, 2025	Hong Kong	China	Hong Kong Coliseum	—
January 5, 2025	Hong Kong	China	Hong Kong Coliseum	—
January 7, 2025	Hong Kong	China	Hong Kong Coliseum	—
January 8, 2025	Hong Kong	China	Hong Kong Coliseum	—
January 9, 2025	Hong Kong	China	Hong Kong Coliseum	—
January 10, 2025	Hong Kong	China	Hong Kong Coliseum	—
Total				N/A
