= Choom World Tour =

2026–27 concert tour by Babymonster

- Tour by Babymonster
- Official promotional poster for the Seoul concert
- Location: Asia; Europe; North America; Oceania; South America
- Associated album: Choom
- Start date: June 26, 2026
- End date: 2027
- No. of shows: 31

Babymonster concert chronology
- Love Monsters Asia Fan Concert (2025–2026); Choom World Tour (2026–2027)

Choom World Tour is the second worldwide concert tour by South Korean girl group Babymonster. While the tour was initially announced on March 16, 2026, the official title and specific dates for the opening Seoul leg were confirmed on March 31, 2026. The tour began on June 26, 2026, at the Jamsil Indoor Stadium in Seoul, South Korea and will continue through 2027. The tour marks a significant milestone for the group, featuring their first solo dome concerts with a two-night residency at Kyocera Dome Osaka in September 2026. The tour is set to consist of at least 31 performances across Asia and Oceania, with additional legs in North America, South America, and Europe planned through 2027.

== Background ==
Following the conclusion of the Love Monsters Asia Fan Concert tour in early 2026, YG Entertainment announced that Babymonster would embark on a larger-scale global tour later that year. On March 16, 2026, the Japanese leg of the tour was revealed, confirming 11 performances across six Japanese cities including Osaka, Yokohama, and Nagoya.

On March 31, 2026, the tour was officially titled "춤" (Choom) with the announcement of a three-night opening residency at the Jamsil Indoor Stadium in Seoul. On May 11, 2026, the tour's scale was further expanded with the announcement of several new dates across Asia and Oceania. This update confirmed performances in cities such as Jakarta, Bangkok, and Singapore, as well as the group's first headlining shows in Manila, Macau, Auckland, Melbourne, and Sydney. Due to rapid sellouts and high ticket demand, YG Entertainment subsequently added extra performances to the Singapore, Macau and Hong Kong legs. The tour is scheduled to consist of at least 31 performances in 18 cities, with further dates for North America, South America, and Europe expected to be announced at a later date, marking the group's largest concert production to date.

== Tour dates ==
List of 2026 concert dates
Date (2026)	City	Country	Venue	Attendance	Ref.
June 26	Seoul	South Korea	Jamsil Indoor Stadium	—	
June 27	Seoul	South Korea	Jamsil Indoor Stadium	—	
June 28	Seoul	South Korea	Jamsil Indoor Stadium	—	
July 8	Kobe	Japan	Glion Arena Kobe	200,000 (Note: The score data is combined from the 11 total shows held in Kobe, Fukuoka, Yokohama, Chiba, Nagoya, and Osaka.)	
July 9	Kobe	Japan	Glion Arena Kobe	200,000	
July 28	Fukuoka	Japan	Marine Messe Fukuoka Hall A	200,000	
July 29	Fukuoka	Japan	Marine Messe Fukuoka Hall A	200,000	
August 1	Yokohama	Japan	Pia Arena MM	200,000	
August 2	Yokohama	Japan	Pia Arena MM	200,000	
August 11	Chiba	Japan	LaLa Arena Tokyo-Bay	200,000	
August 12	Chiba	Japan	LaLa Arena Tokyo-Bay	200,000	
August 16	Nagoya	Japan	IG Arena	200,000	
September 5	Manila	Philippines	SM Mall of Asia Arena	—	
September 11	Macau		Venetian Arena	18,000	
September 12	Macau		Venetian Arena	18,000	
September 22	Osaka	Japan	Kyocera Dome Osaka		
September 23	Osaka	Japan	Kyocera Dome Osaka		
October 17	Jakarta	Indonesia	Indonesia Arena	—	
November 7	Bangkok	Thailand	Impact Arena	—	
November 8	Bangkok	Thailand	Impact Arena	—	
November 14	Kuala Lumpur	Malaysia	Unifi Arena	—	
November 21	Taipei	Taiwan	Taipei Arena	—	
November 22	Taipei	Taiwan	Taipei Arena	—	
November 28	Singapore		Singapore Indoor Stadium	—	
November 29	Singapore		Singapore Indoor Stadium	—	
December 8	Auckland	New Zealand	Spark Arena	—	
December 11	Melbourne	Australia	Rod Laver Arena	—	
December 13	Sydney	Australia	Qudos Bank Arena	—	
Total				—	

List of 2027 concert dates
Date (2027)	City	Country	Venue	Attendance	Ref.
January 8	Hong Kong		AsiaWorld–Arena	—	
January 9	Hong Kong		AsiaWorld–Arena	—	
January 10	Hong Kong		AsiaWorld–Arena	—	
Total				—	
