= Neo City – The Momentum =

2025 concert tour by NCT 127

- Tour by NCT 127
- Official poster
- Associated album: Walk
- Start date: January 18, 2025
- End date: May 22, 2025
- Legs: 3
- No. of shows: 24

NCT 127 concert chronology
- Neo City – The Unity (2023–2024); Neo City – The Momentum (2025); Neo City – The Redline (2026-2027)

Neo City – The Momentum (stylized as NCT 127 4th Tour "Neo City – The Momentum") was the fourth concert tour headlined by NCT 127, the Seoul-based sub-unit of South Korean boy group NCT, in support of their fifth studio album Walk (2024). It began on January 18, 2025, at Gocheok Sky Dome, in South Korea, and concluded on May 22, 2025, at Tokyo Dome in Tokyo, Japan.

== Commercial performance ==
The concerts at the Gocheok Sky Dome in Seoul attracted over 50,000 online and offline viewers.

== Set list ==
The following set list is obtained from the January 18, 2025, show in Seoul. It is not intended to represent all shows throughout the tour.

1. "Gas"
2. "Faster"
3. "Bring The Noize"
4. "2 Baddies"
5. "Skyscraper"
6. "Chain" (Korean version)
7. "Designer"
8. "Orange Seoul"
9. "Touch"
10. "No Clue"
11. "Pricey"
12. "Regular"
13. "Sticker"
14. "Whiplash"
15. "Lemonade"
16. "Rain Drop"
17. "Can't Help Myself"
18. "Gold Dust"
19. "No Longer"
20. "Far"
21. "Kick It"
22. "Fact Check"

Encore

1. "Intro : Wall to Wall"
2. "Walk"
3. "Meaning of Love"
4. "Time Capsule"
5. "Promise You"

=== Notes ===
- During the second show in Seoul, "Time Capsule" was replaced by "Dreams Come True".
- During all the shows in Japan, "Time Capsule" was replaced by "Sunny Road".

== Tour dates ==
List of concert dates
Date	City	Country	Venue	Attendance
January 18, 2025	Seoul	South Korea	Gocheok Sky Dome; Beyond Live and Weverse	—
January 19, 2025	Seoul	South Korea	Gocheok Sky Dome; Beyond Live and Weverse	—
February 15, 2025	Jakarta	Indonesia	Indonesia Arena	—
February 16, 2025	Jakarta	Indonesia	Indonesia Arena	—
February 22, 2025	Bangkok	Thailand	Thunderdome Stadium	36,000
February 23, 2025	Bangkok	Thailand	Thunderdome Stadium	36,000
February 28, 2025	Duluth	United States	Gas South Arena	—
March 2, 2025	Newark	United States	Prudential Center	—
March 5, 2025	Toronto	Canada	Scotiabank Arena	—
March 7, 2025	Rosemont	United States	Allstate Arena	—
March 9, 2025	San Antonio	United States	Frost Bank Center	—
March 12, 2025	Los Angeles	United States	Crypto.com Arena	—
March 15, 2025	Osaka	Japan	Kyocera Dome Osaka	—
March 16, 2025	Osaka	Japan	Kyocera Dome Osaka	—
March 22, 2025	Taoyuan (Note: Promoted as Taipei)	Taiwan	NTSU Arena	—
March 23, 2025	Taoyuan	Taiwan	NTSU Arena	—
March 29, 2025	Fukuoka	Japan	West Japan General Exhibition Center New Building	—
March 30, 2025	Fukuoka	Japan	West Japan General Exhibition Center New Building	—
April 5, 2025	Nagoya	Japan	Aichi Sky Expo Hall A	—
April 6, 2025	Nagoya	Japan	Aichi Sky Expo Hall A	—
April 26, 2025	Macau	China	Galaxy Arena	—
April 27, 2025	Macau	China	Galaxy Arena	—
May 21, 2025	Tokyo	Japan	Tokyo Dome	—
May 22, 2025	Tokyo	Japan	Tokyo Dome	—
Total				N/A
