= Neo City – The Unity =

2023–2024 concert tour by NCT 127

- Tour by NCT 127
- Official poster
- Location: Asia
- Associated album: Fact Check
- Start date: November 17, 2023
- End date: March 10, 2024
- Legs: 1
- No. of shows: 19

NCT 127 concert chronology
- Neo City – The Link (2021–2023); Neo City – The Unity (2023–2024); Neo City – The Momentum (2025)

Neo City – The Unity (or NCT 127 3rd Tour "NEO CITY – THE UNITY") was third concert tour headlined by NCT 127, the Seoul-based sub-unit of South Korean boy group NCT, in support of their fifth studio album Fact Check (2023). The tour began in November 2023 with six shows at the KSPO Dome in Seoul, South Korea, and continue in 2024 with 13 additional shows in Asia. The tour concluded on March 10, 2024, in Tokyo, Japan.

== Set lists ==
Set list in Seoul

Main set

1. "Punch"
2. "Superhuman"
3. "Ay-Yo"
4. "Crash Landing"
5. "Space"
6. "Time Lapse"
7. "Skyscraper"
8. "Parade"
9. "DJ"
10. "Yacht"
11. "Je Ne Sais Quoi"
12. "Fire Truck"
13. "Sit Down"
14. "Chain"
15. "Cherry Bomb"
16. "Gold Dust"
17. "Fly Away With Me"
18. "Misty"
19. "Love Is A Beauty"
20. "Simon Says"
21. "Tasty"
22. "Favorite (Vampire)"
23. "Kick It"
24. "2 Baddies"
25. "Fact Check"

Encore

26. "Angel Eyes"
27. "Pandora's Box"
28. "Promise You"

=== Notes ===
- During Week 2 of the Seoul shows, "Misty" was replaced by "Magic Carpet Ride".
- During Week 2 of the Seoul shows, "Yacht" was replaced by "Boom".
- During Week 2 of the Seoul shows, "Pandora's Box" was replaced by "Black Clouds".
- During the rest of the tour, "Misty" was replaced by "White Lie".
- During the rest of the tour, "Be There For Me" was added after "Pandora's Box".
- During all the shows in Japan, "Pandora's Box" was replaced by "Sunny Road".

== Tour dates ==
Date	City	Country	Venue	Attendance (Note: Estimated number of attendees based on news articles. The exact number during each concert may be higher or lower.)
November 17, 2023	Seoul	South Korea	KSPO Dome	60,000
November 18, 2023	Seoul	South Korea	KSPO Dome	60,000
November 19, 2023	Seoul	South Korea	KSPO Dome	60,000
November 24, 2023	Seoul	South Korea	KSPO Dome	60,000
November 25, 2023	Seoul	South Korea	KSPO Dome	60,000
November 26, 2023	Seoul	South Korea	KSPO Dome	60,000
January 7, 2024	Nagoya	Japan	Vantelin Dome Nagoya	(Note: The score data is combined from the six total shows held in Nagoya, Osaka, and Tokyo.)
January 8, 2024	Nagoya	Japan	Vantelin Dome Nagoya	(Note: The score data is combined from the six total shows held in Nagoya, Osaka, and Tokyo.)
January 13, 2024	Jakarta	Indonesia	Indonesia Arena	24,000
January 14, 2024	Jakarta	Indonesia	Indonesia Arena	24,000
January 21, 2024	Bulacan	Philippines	Philippine Sports Stadium	—
January 27, 2024	Bangkok	Thailand	Thammasat Stadium	50,000
January 28, 2024	Bangkok	Thailand	Thammasat Stadium	50,000
February 3, 2024	Macau	China	Galaxy Arena	23,000
February 4, 2024	Macau	China	Galaxy Arena	23,000
February 10, 2024	Osaka	Japan	Kyocera Dome Osaka	260,000
February 11, 2024	Osaka	Japan	Kyocera Dome Osaka	260,000
March 9, 2024	Tokyo	Japan	Tokyo Dome	260,000
March 10, 2024	Tokyo	Japan	Tokyo Dome	260,000
