= Galaxy Macau =

Casino resort in Cotai, Macau, China

Coordinates: 22°08′59″N 113°33′10″E

- 澳門銀河綜合渡假城 (Yue Chinese)

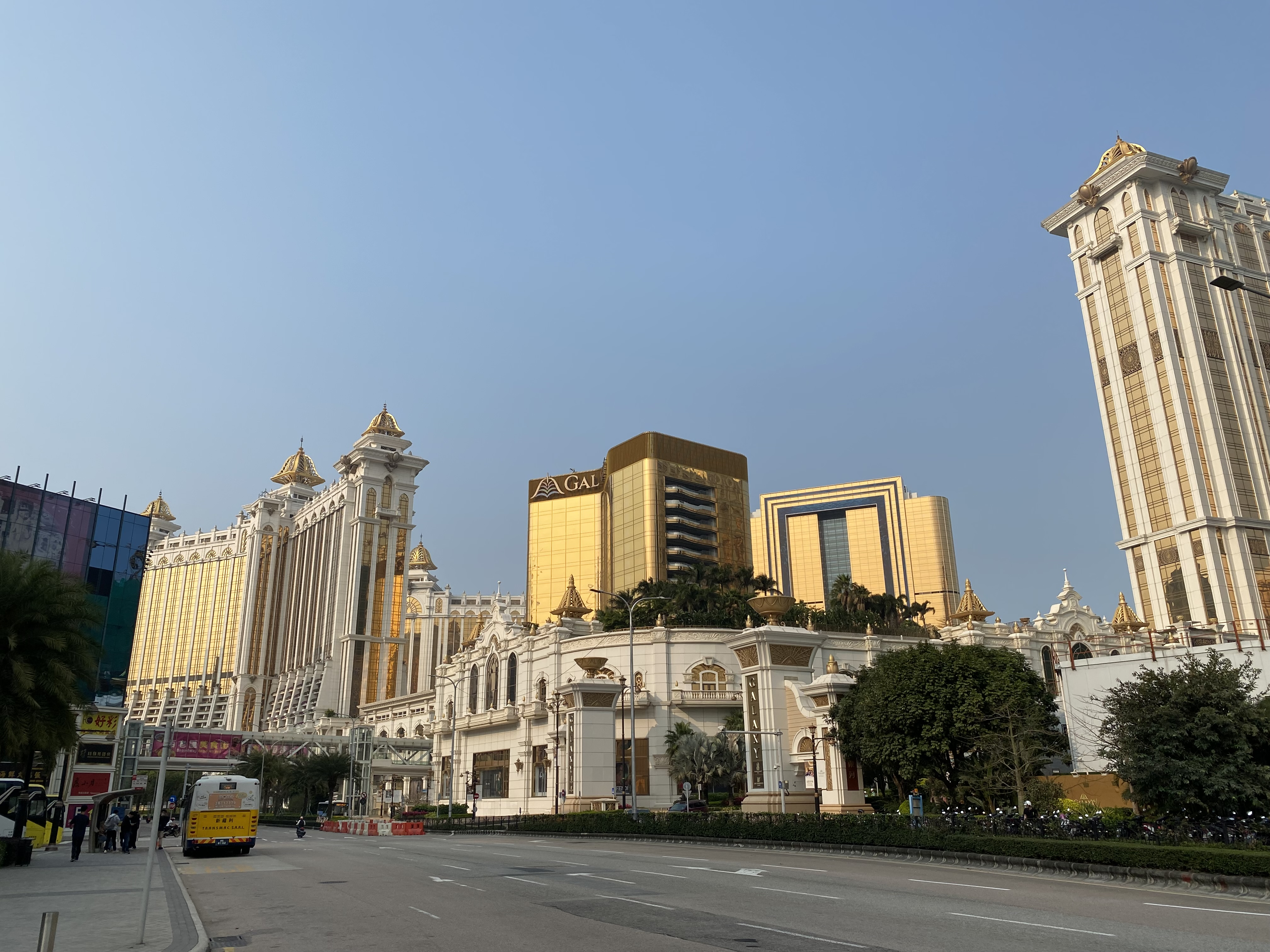
- Galaxy Macau (2023)
- Interactive map of Galaxy Macau
- Location: Galaxy Macau Resort, Cotai, Macau
- Opened: 15 May 2011; 15 years ago
- No. of rooms: 4,703
- Gaming space: 37,160 m²
- Signature attractions: Artificial beach and wave pool
- Notable restaurants: Over 50 outlets
- Casino type: Land-Based
- Owner: Galaxy Entertainment Group
- Architect: Simon Kwan & Associates
- Website: galaxymacau.com

Galaxy Macau
- Traditional Chinese: 澳門銀河綜合渡假城
- Simplified Chinese: 澳门银河综合渡假城
Transcriptions
Standard Mandarin
- Hanyu Pinyin: Àomén Yínhé Zōnghé Dùjiàchéng
Yue: Cantonese
- Jyutping: ou3 mun4*2 ngan4 ho4 zung3 hap6 dou6 ga3 sing4

Galaxy Macau (Chinese: 澳門銀河綜合渡假城) is a casino resort located in Cotai, Macau. Construction on the Cotai project began in 2002. Its opening was rescheduled several times. Galaxy Entertainment Group's developer announced on 10 March 2011 that the HKD 14.9 billion (US$1.9 billion) resort would officially open on 15 May 2011. The resort was designed by Gary Goddard. Currently consists of eight different luxury resort hotels, each with a theme: Galaxy Macau, Okura, Banyan Tree, JW Marriott, Ritz-Carlton, Raffles, Capella and Andaz.

== History ==
When the Cotai project's first phase opened in 2011. The 550,000 square metres (5,900,000 sq ft) property offered around 2,200 hotel rooms comprising the Galaxy Macau hotel tower, complete with casino and entertainment areas, as well as two hotel partners, the Japanese-owned Hotel Okura and the Singapore-operated Banyan Tree Hotel.

On 26 April 2012, Galaxy Macau announced that JW Marriott and Ritz-Carlton hotels would be added to the Cotai resort. Galaxy's Chief Financial Officer Robert Drake said it would start construction of the two hotels at the end of 2013 and begin operations gradually from 2016 through 2018.

According to a presentation released by Galaxy Entertainment, the total investment for Galaxy Phase 2 was estimated to be 16 billion HKD, with construction completion scheduled for mid-2015. Phase 2 would consist of 450,000 square metres (4,800,000 sq ft) of new resort space, additional rooms across the five hotels, and an increased casino table count of up to 500. Phase 2 was eventually opened on 27 May 2015.

As part of its Phase 3 expansion, a large-scale 16,000-seat arena named Galaxy Arena, a 650-seat auditorium, 40,000 square metres of MICE space, and a 700-room Andaz hotel was completed in the second half of 2021. The expansion, named Galaxy International Convention Centre (GICC), is built adjacent to Macau Light Rapid Transit's Cotai West Station. Announced on 1 March 2021, Galaxy Macau had signed an agreement with Accor (Raffles Hotels & Resorts) to bring the Raffles brand to the resort.

The 450-room Raffles at Galaxy Macau is housed in an all-new exclusive all-suite tower as part of Phase 3 which was opened. Located east of the resort, the hotel now features a glass airbridge connecting the two towers on every floor. A Mediterranean-inspired garden with a glass house as its focal point, an infinity edge pool, a luxury spa, and a fine dining restaurant are also part of the hotel. Raffles at Galaxy Macau opened in the second half of 2021.

The 93-room luxury Capella at Galaxy Macau hotel opened in August 2025.

Phase 4 of the expansion, which will include multiple new-to-Macau luxury hotel brands, a 5000-seat theater, and a new casino. As of 2025, the Phase 4 structures have been completed and are being fitted out, and the complex is set to open in 2027.

=== Gold Leaf Cupolas ===
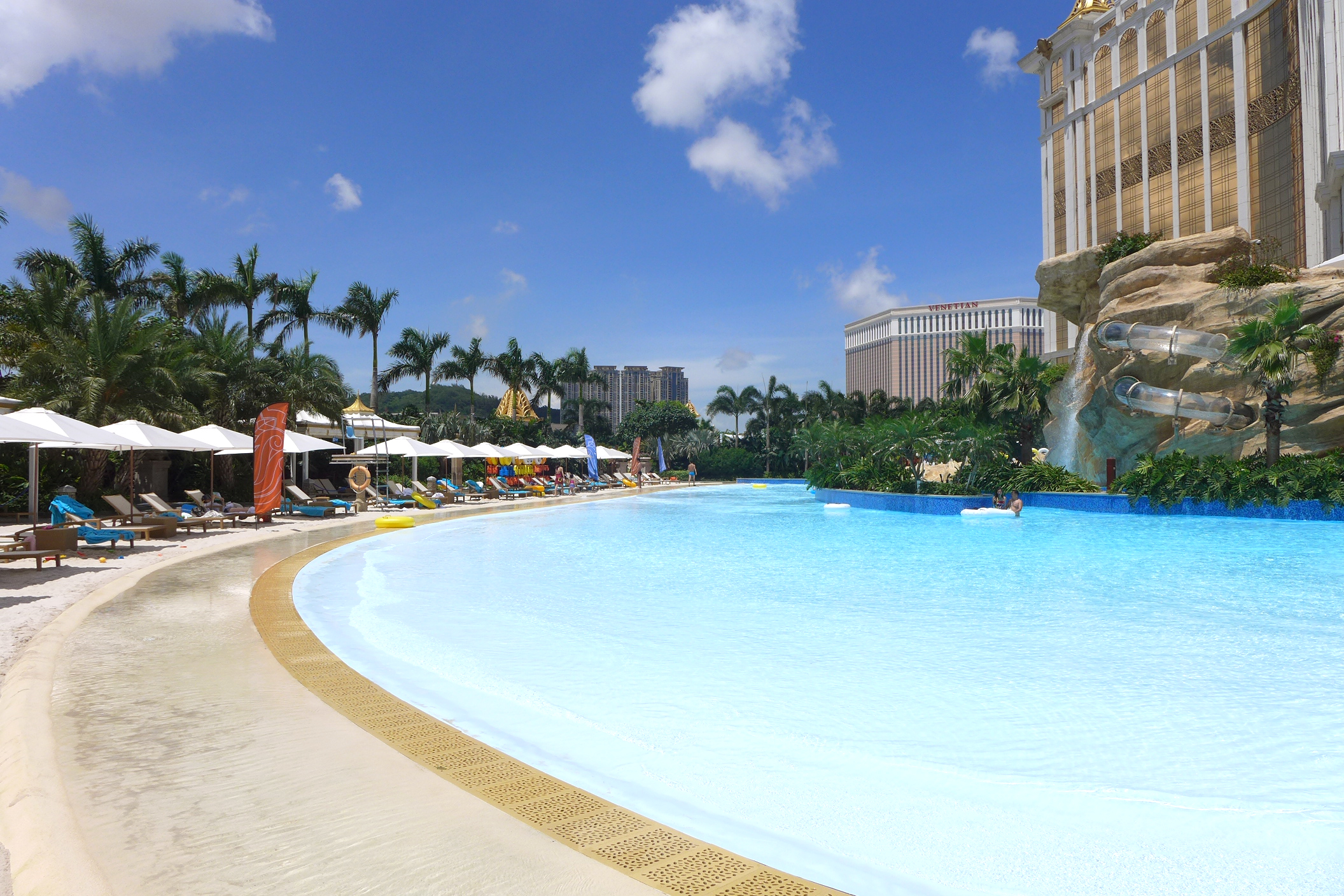
Galaxy Hotel Macau, Poolside

There are 6 gold-covered cupolas at the top of the two towers of Galaxy Macau. Four measure 15 metres (49 ft) high and the other two at 24 metres (79 ft). The cupolas feature a laser show system which projects laser beams into the sky every 15 minutes. It is claimed to be the largest laser show in the world and is visible across Macau. The laser show ends abruptly at midnight.

=== UA Galaxy Cinemas ===
On 15 December 2011, Galaxy Macau opened UA Galaxy Cinemas & East Square.

== Hotels in Galaxy Macau ==
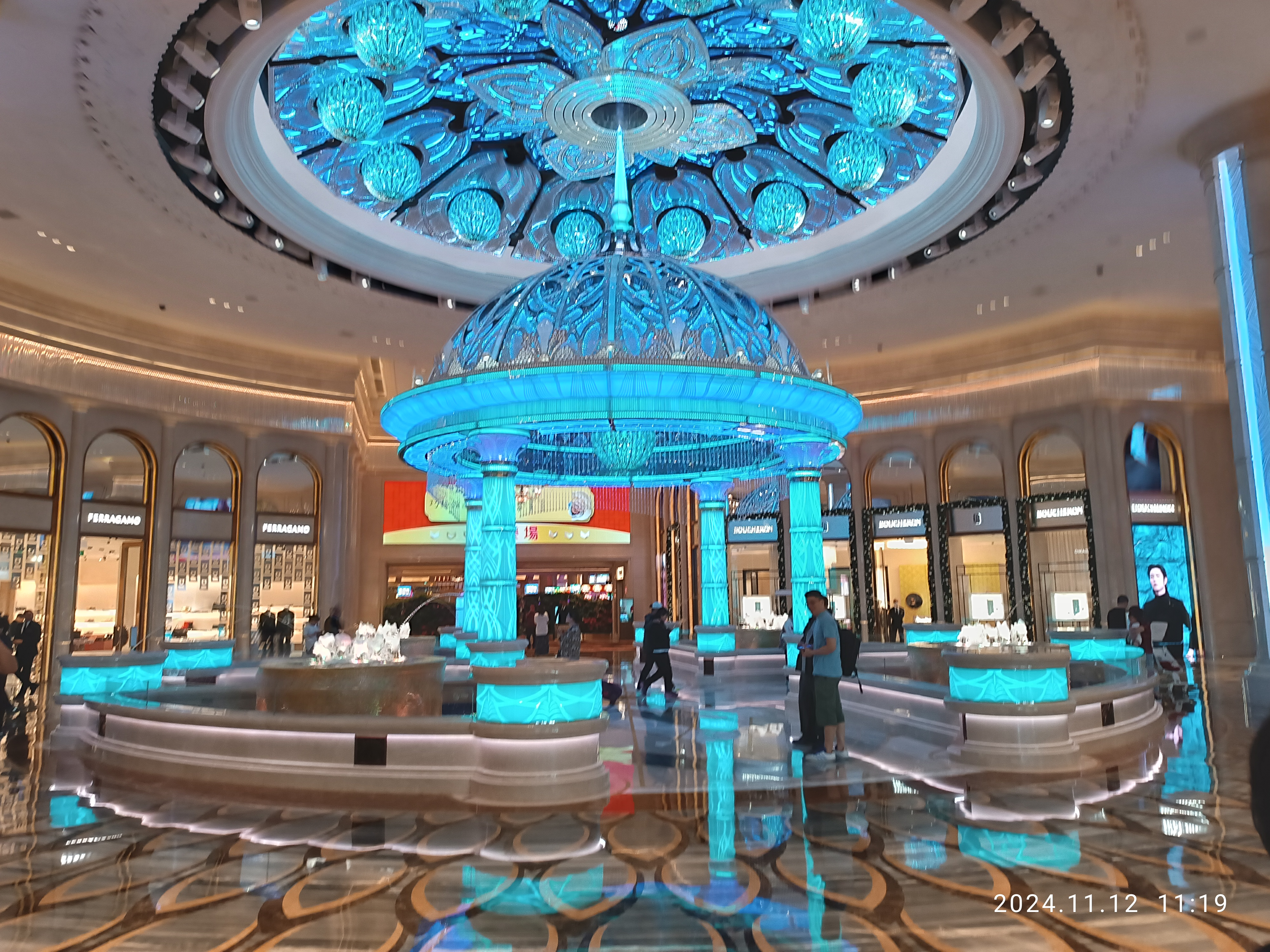
Crystal lobby at Galaxy Macau

Hotels	No. of Rooms	Management
Hotel Okura Macau	488	Okura Hotels & Resorts
Banyan Tree Macau	256	Banyan Tree Holdings Limited
Galaxy Hotel	1,449	Galaxy Macau
JW Marriott Macau	1,015	JW Marriott Hotels
The Ritz-Carlton Macau	250	The Ritz-Carlton Hotel Company
Raffles at Galaxy Macau	450	Raffles Hotels & Resorts
Andaz Macau at GalaxyICC	700	Hyatt Hotels & Resorts
Capella at Galaxy Macau	95	Capella Hotels and Resorts

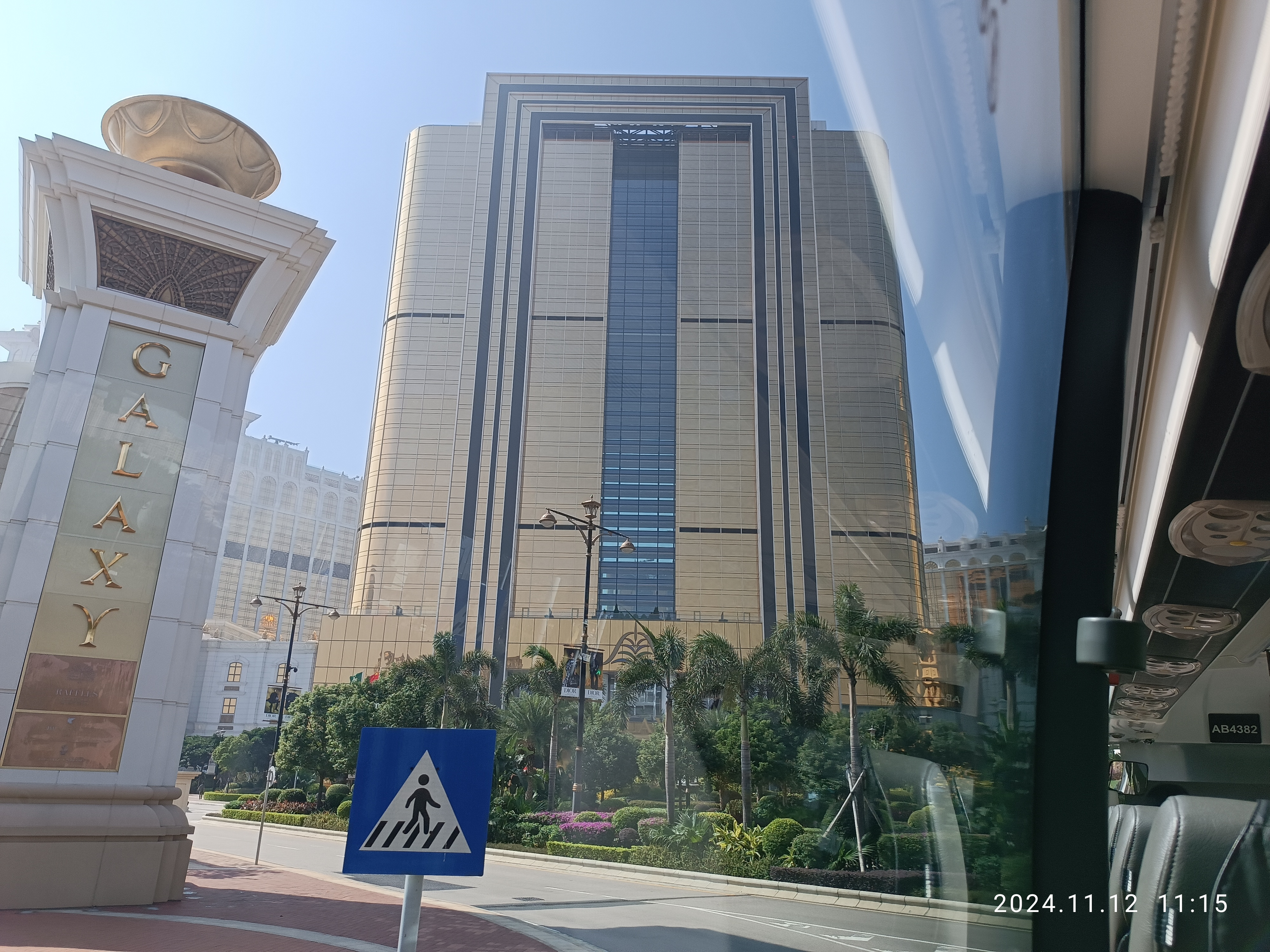
Raffles at Galaxy Macau (2024)

== Entertainment events ==
Entertainment events at Galaxy Arena
Date	Artist	Event	Ref
2023
3–4 February	NCT 127	Neo City – The Unity	
22 April	Treasure	Hello Tour	
20–21 May	Blackpink	Born Pink World Tour	
13–14 October	(G)I-dle	I Am Free-ty World Tour	
8–10 December	Joker Xue	Extraterrestrial World Tour	
2024
26–28 January	Enhypen	Fate World Tour	
29 June	Baekhyun	Lonsdaleite Tour	
30–31 August	Tomorrow X Together	Act: Promise World Tour	
3–6 October	Andy Lau	Today... is the Day Tour	
25–27 October	(G)I-dle	I-dol World Tour	
2–3 November	Zerobaseone	Timeless World	
29–30 November	Stray Kids	Dominate World Tour	
2025
9 February	Green Day	The Saviors Tour	
15–16 February	Taeyang	The Light Year Tour	
21–22 March	Jisoo	Lights, Love, Action! Asia Tour	
29 March	Andrea Bocelli	Andrea Bocelli Live in Concert	
26–27 April	NCT 127	Neo City – The Momentum	
3 May	Wakin Chau	Wakin Chau World Tour Live	
9–11 May	Tomorrow X Together	Act: Promise World Tour EP.2	
17–18 May	J-Hope	Hope on the Stage Tour	
31 May	Show Lo	Show Lo 30 World Tour Concert	
6–8 June	G-Dragon	Übermensch World Tour	
20–21, 27–29 June 4–6 July	Jacky Cheung	Jacky Cheung 60+ Concert Tour	
30–31 August	Baekhyun	Reverie World Tour	
2026
10–11 January	Super Junior	Super Show 10	
7 February	Riize	Riizing Loud	
7–8 March	Aespa	Synk: Aexis Line	
22–23 May	Exo	Exo Planet 6 – Exhorizon	

== Gallery ==
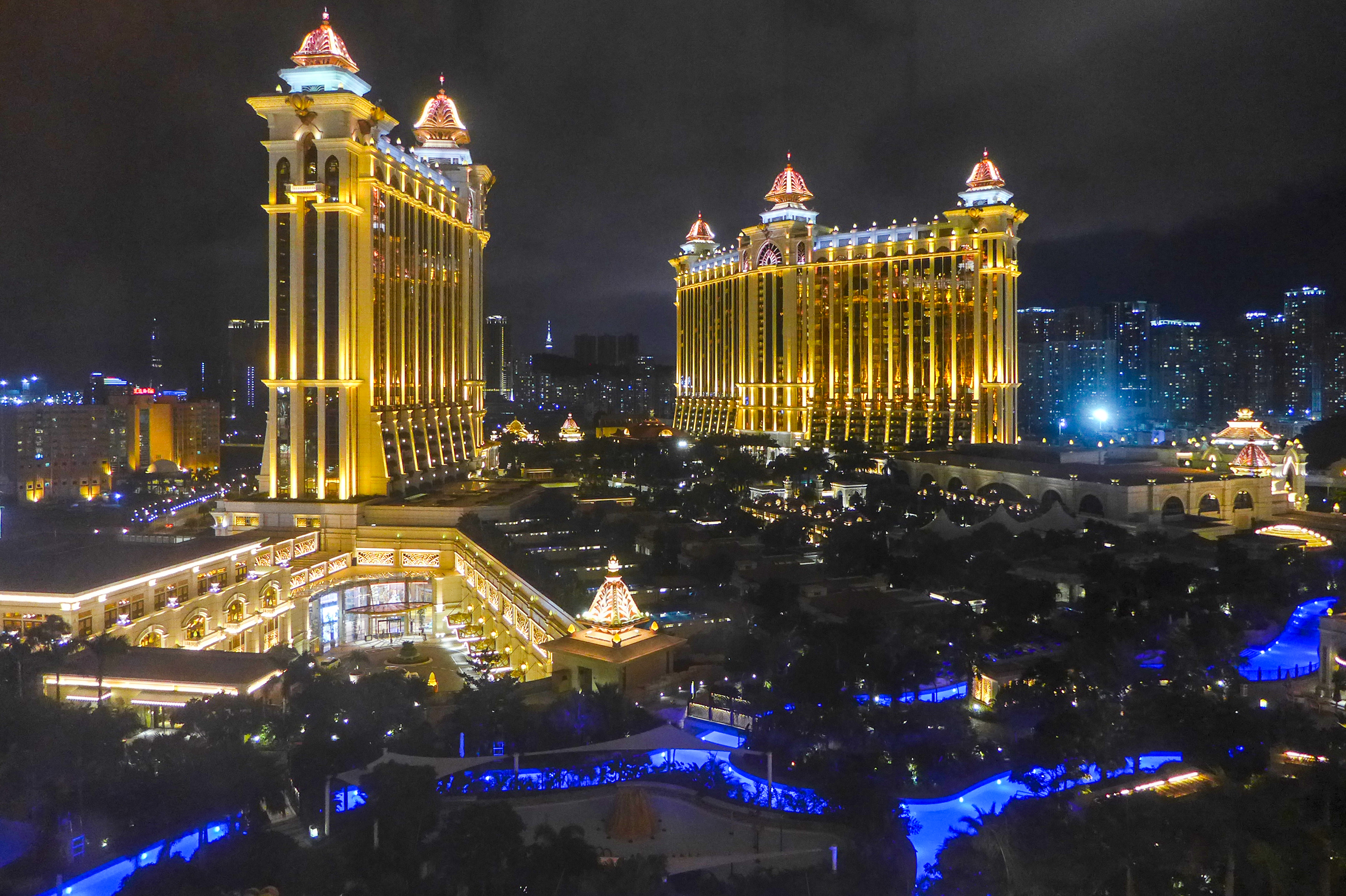
The resort as seen at night in 2016

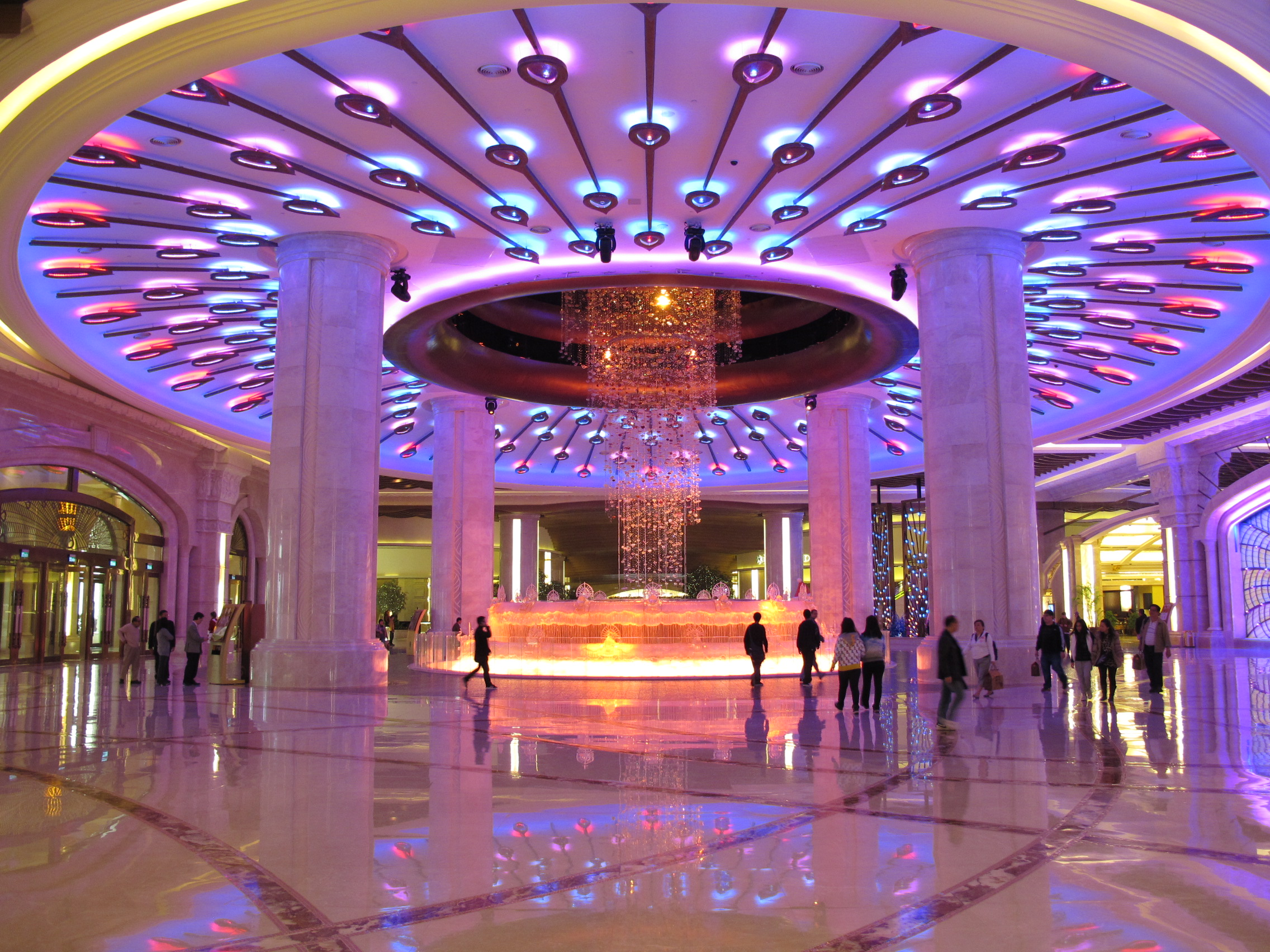
The main lobby in 2011

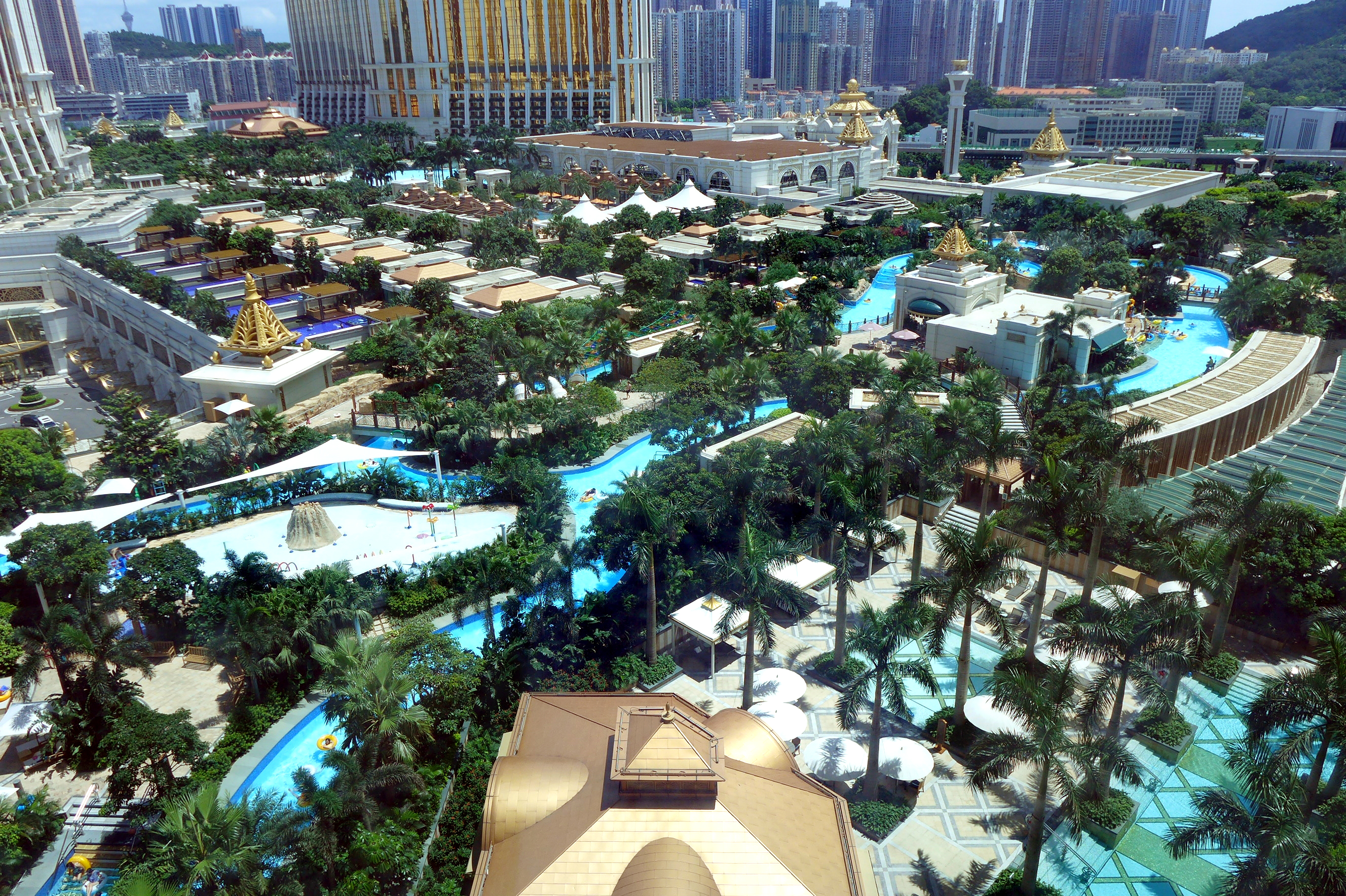
Lazy river in 2016

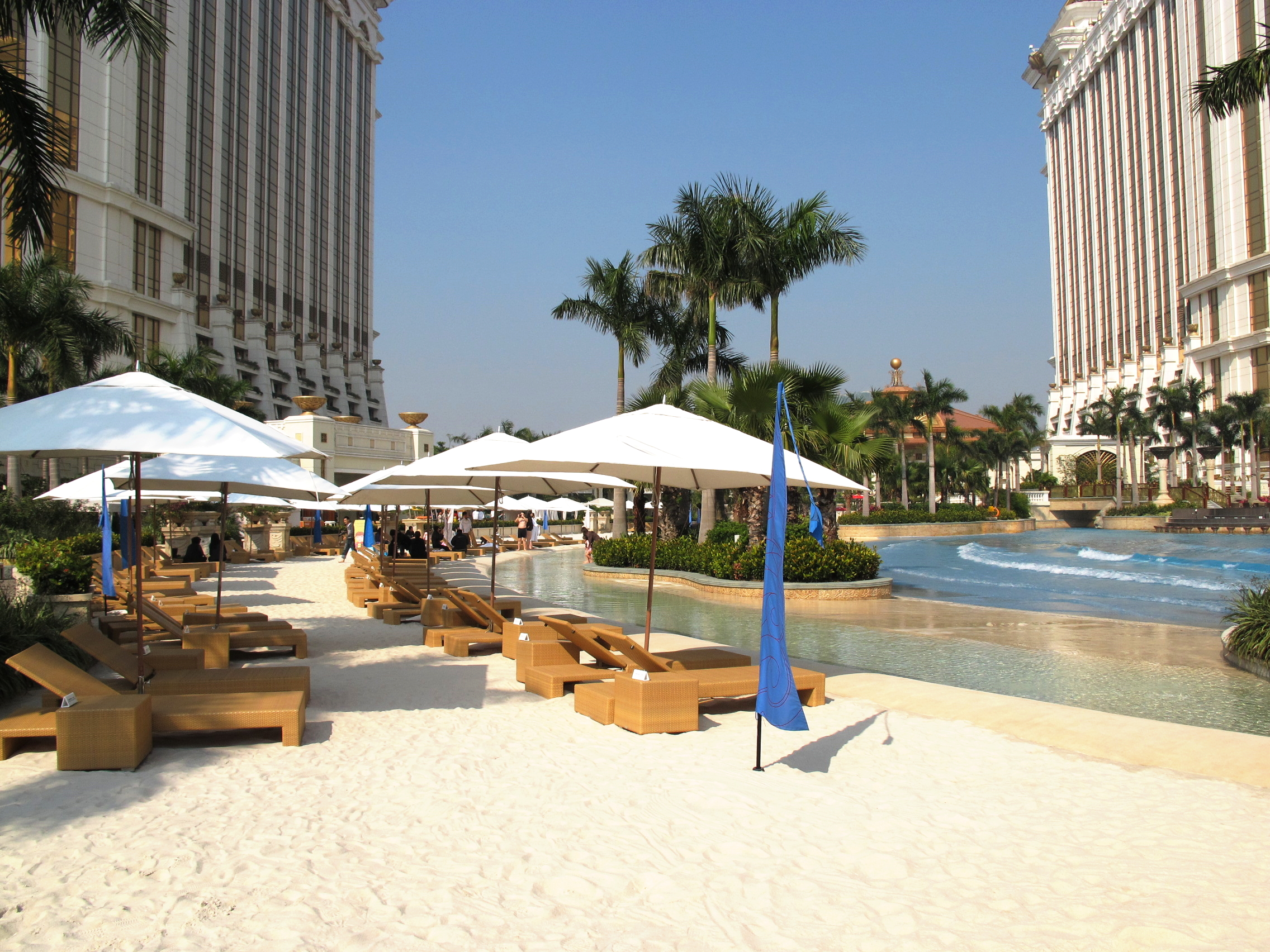
Resort beach in 2011

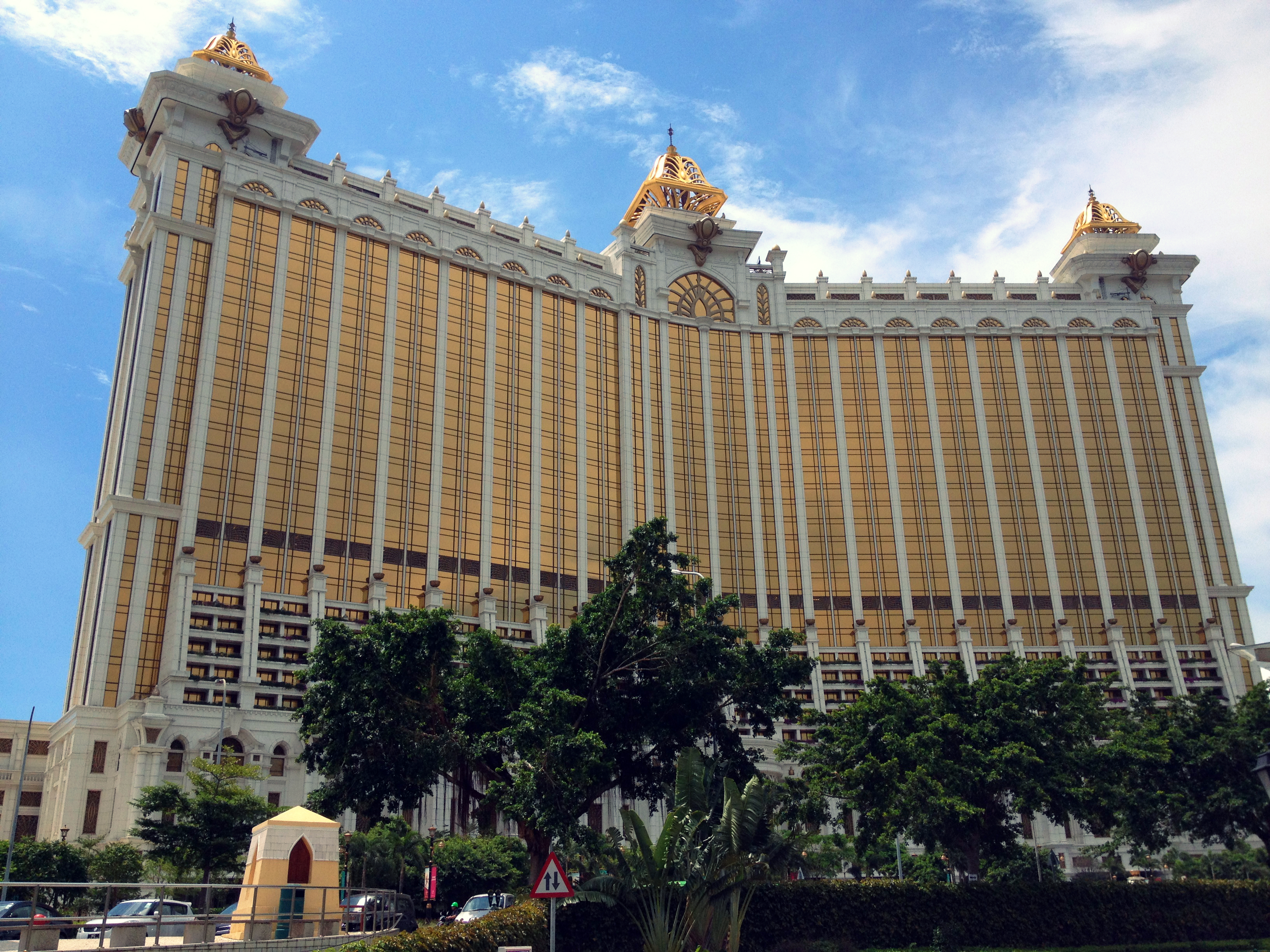
Full view of resort tower

== See also ==
- Gambling in Macau
- List of Macau casinos
- List of integrated resorts
- List of largest hotels
