= Hello Monsters World Tour =

2025 concert tour by Babymonster

- Tour by Babymonster
- Location: Asia; North America
- Start date: January 25, 2025
- End date: September 12, 2025
- No. of shows: 32
- Attendance: 300,000

Babymonster concert chronology
- See You There (2024); Hello Monsters World Tour (2025); Love Monsters Asia Fan Concert (2025-26)

Hello Monsters World Tour was the first worldwide concert tour by South Korean girl group Babymonster. The tour began on January 25, 2025, at the KSPO Dome in Seoul, South Korea, and concluded at the Climate Pledge Arena in Seattle, United States. Spanning 32 dates, the tour attracted 300,000 people in total.

== Background and development ==
On November 18, 2024, YG Entertainment announced that Babymonster would be embarking on their first world tour titled "Hello Monsters" in January of the following year, with shows scheduled to take place across Asia and the United States.

On January 6, YG added Singapore, Hong Kong, and Bangkok to the tour. On January 13, YG added Ho Chi Minh City and Jakarta to the tour. On January 20, 2025, two additional dates for Kuala Lumpur on June 21 and in Taipei on June 28, were revealed.

On March 3, an additional tour leg across North America was announced.

On May 9, YG Entertainment announced that member Rami will be going on hiatus to focus on her health and thus will not be joining the Babymonster Asia tour.

== Commercial performance ==
According to the Korea Performing Arts Box Office Information System (KOPIS), the shows at the KSPO Dome in South Korea sold a total of 20,349 tickets, including 10,113 tickets on day 1 and 10,236 tickets on day 2, which grossed an estimated ₩3.36 billion in ticket revenue.

== Tour dates ==
Key
†	Indicates performances streamed simultaneously on OTT platforms

List of concert dates
Date (2025)	City	Country	Venue	Attendance	Ref.
January 25	Seoul	South Korea	KSPO Dome	20,349	
January 26	Seoul	South Korea	KSPO Dome	20,349	
February 28	Newark	United States	Prudential Center	—	
March 2	Inglewood (Note: Promoted as Los Angeles)	United States	Kia Forum	—	
March 14	Yokohama (Note: Promoted as Kanagawa)	Japan	Pia Arena MM	30,000	
March 15	Yokohama	Japan	Pia Arena MM	30,000	
March 16	Yokohama	Japan	Pia Arena MM	30,000	
March 22	Nagoya (Note: Promoted as Aichi)	Japan	Port Messe Nagoya Exhibition Hall 1	24,000	
March 23	Nagoya	Japan	Port Messe Nagoya Exhibition Hall 1	24,000	
April 3	Osaka	Japan	Asue Osaka Arena	20,000	
April 4	Osaka	Japan	Asue Osaka Arena	20,000	
April 11	Yokohama	Japan	K-Arena Yokohama	55,000	
April 12	Yokohama	Japan	K-Arena Yokohama	55,000	
April 13 †	Yokohama	Japan	K-Arena Yokohama	55,000	
April 19	Fukuoka	Japan	Fukuoka Kokusai Center	—	
April 20	Fukuoka	Japan	Fukuoka Kokusai Center	—	
May 17	Singapore		Singapore Indoor Stadium	9,000	
May 24	Hong Kong		AsiaWorld–Arena	—	
May 25	Hong Kong		AsiaWorld–Arena	—	
May 31	Ho Chi Minh City	Vietnam	Saigon Exhibition and Convention Center	—	
June 7	Pak Kret (Note: Labeled as Bangkok in promotional material.)	Thailand	Impact Arena	—	
June 8	Pak Kret	Thailand	Impact Arena	—	
June 14	Tangerang (Note: Promoted as Jakarta)	Indonesia	ICE BSD City Hall 5-6	—	
June 21	Kuala Lumpur	Malaysia	Axiata Arena	9,600	
June 28	Taoyuan (Note: Labeled as Taipei in promotional material.)	Taiwan	NTSU Arena	20,000	
June 29	Taoyuan	Taiwan	NTSU Arena	20,000	
August 30	Toronto	Canada	Scotiabank Arena	—	
September 2	Rosemont	United States	Allstate Arena	—	
September 5	Atlanta	United States	State Farm Arena	—	
September 7	Fort Worth	United States	Dickies Arena	—	
September 10	Oakland	United States	Oakland Arena	—	
September 12	Seattle	United States	Climate Pledge Arena	—	
Total				300,000	
