= NCT 127 =

South Korean boy band

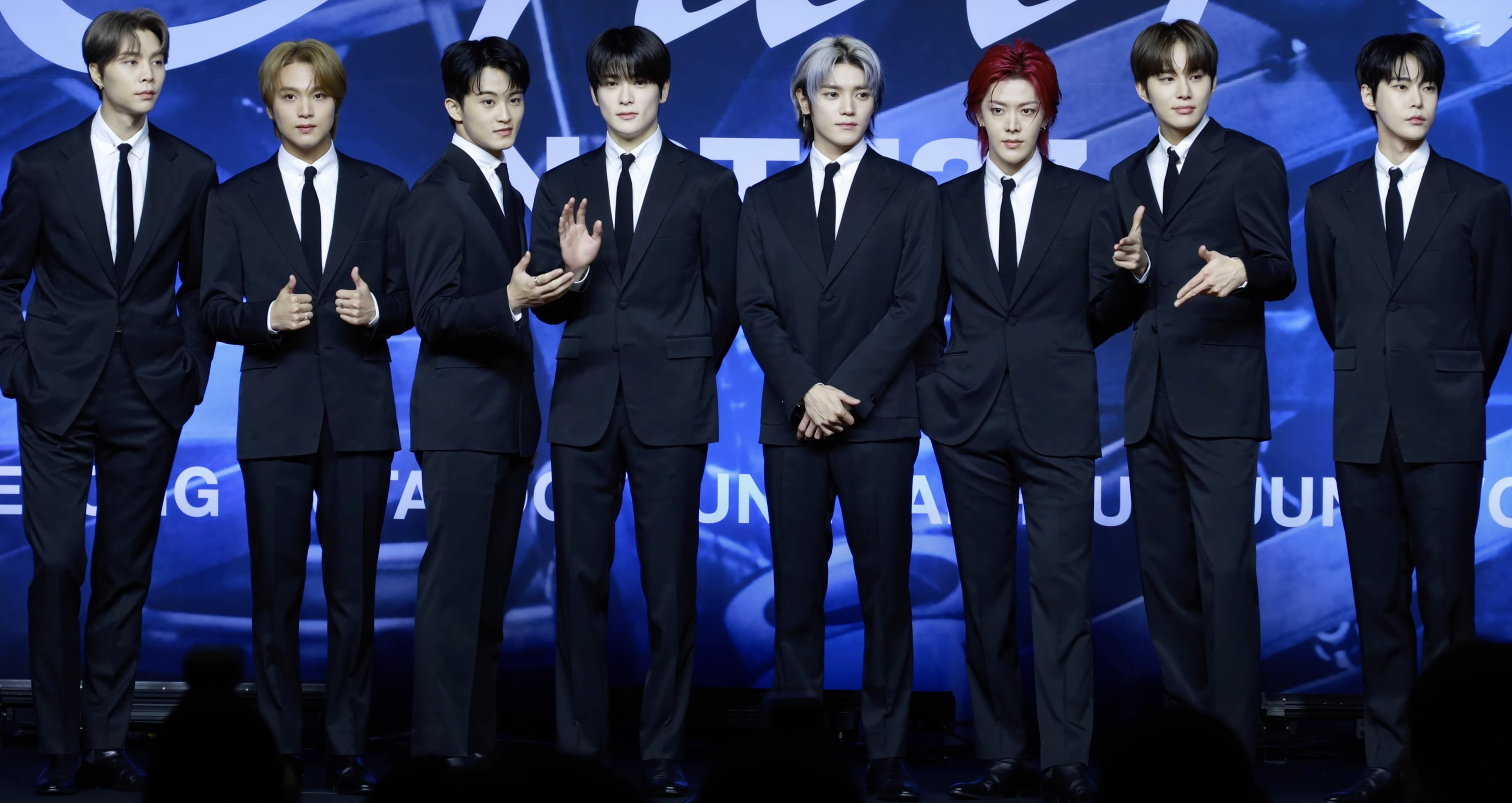
- NCT 127 in October 2023; From left to right: Johnny, Haechan, Mark, Jaehyun, Taeyong, Yuta, Jungwoo, and Doyoung

Background information
- Origin: Seoul, South Korea
- Genres: K-pop; Hip hop; R&B
- Years active: 2016–present
- Labels: SM; Avex Trax; Capitol; Virgin Music
- Spinoff of: NCT
- Members: Johnny; Taeyong; Yuta; Doyoung; Jaehyun; Jungwoo; Haechan
- Past members: Taeil; Winwin; Mark
- Website: Official website

NCT 127 (Korean: 엔시티 127; RR: Ensiti Il-i-chil) is the first fixed and second overall sub-unit of the South Korean boy band NCT, formed and managed by SM Entertainment. They originally debuted on July 7, 2016, with their debut extended play NCT#127, with an original lineup of seven members: Taeil, Taeyong, Yuta, Jaehyun, Winwin, Mark, and Haechan. Doyoung and Johnny joined the unit in December 2016, ahead of their second EP Limitless, while Jungwoo, the final member, was introduced in September 2018 ahead of their first studio album Regular-Irregular. They are known for their experimental hip hop-based music, which they refer to as "neo music", as well as their vocal and rap abilities, choreographies, and performances.

After debuting in 2016, they broke into the domestic mainstream in 2017 with "Cherry Bomb", now recognized as one of their signature songs, and received greater international attention following the release of "Kick It" in 2020.

In April 2019, NCT 127's increasing global popularity prompted SM Entertainment to sign marketing and distribution deals with Capitol Music Group and Caroline Distribution, respectively. The unit subsequently released the EP We Are Superhuman that year and their second Korean studio album, Neo Zone, in 2020, the latter becoming their first top-five entry on the US Billboard 200 and their first release to sell over one million copies. In 2021, NCT 127 released their third Korean studio album, Sticker, and its repackaged version Favorite. With a combined 3.58 million copies sold, it broke the record for the best-selling album of all time by an act under SM Entertainment and earned the group the Daesang (Note: A daesang (Korean: 대상), which translates to "grand prize", is the highest honor given out at South Korean music award ceremonies in recognition of the artist(s) with the greatest physical and digital achievements for the year.) award at the 31st Seoul Music Awards. Sticker debuted at number three on the Billboard 200, becoming the longest and highest-charting K-pop album in the US in 2021. In 2022, NCT 127 released their fourth Korean studio album 2 Baddies, which sold 3.2 million copies and made them the second K-pop act to have three albums debut in the top five of the Billboard 200.

== Background and name ==
In January 2016, SM Entertainment founder Lee Soo-man delivered a presentation at the SM Coex Artium titled "SMTOWN: New Culture Technology 2016". Lee announced that the label planned to debut a new boy group with an "unlimited" number of members, in alignment with their "culture contents" strategy. The group would have "sub-unit teams" of different members from different cities around the world, and the units would collaborate with each other frequently. Lee revealed the name of the group to be NCT, an acronym of the presentation title. NCT was to be SM Entertainment's first idol group to debut since Red Velvet in August 2014 and the label's first boy group to debut since South Korean–Chinese boy band Exo in 2012. During the presentation, Lee also announced plans to debut the first NCT unit within the first half of 2016 in Seoul and Tokyo, with sub-units based in Chinese cities to follow in the latter half of the year and units in Southeast Asia and Latin America later.

On July 1, 2016, NCT 127 was announced as the second sub-unit, a Seoul-based, multi-national boy group that would promote actively in South Korea. The name "NCT 127" combines the acronym for Neo Culture Technology with the number "127", the longitude coordinate of the city of Seoul.

== History ==
=== 2013–2016: Formation, pre-debut activities and early days ===
All ten members of NCT 127 were originally introduced through SM Rookies, a pre-debut training team established by SM Entertainment. Johnny was the first member to join the label through an American audition at Chicago, Illinois, in 2007, while Yuta was recruited through the SM Global Audition in Osaka, Japan and Mark in Vancouver, Canada in 2012. The same year, Taeyong and Jaehyun joined the label after being cast by label employees and passing auditions and were the first members to be introduced through SM Rookies. Taeil was the next member to join the label in 2013, despite having chosen twice before to not pursue an idol career. Doyoung and Donghyuck joined the label in 2013, with Winwin being introduced through SM Rookies on January 5, 2016, and Jungwoo on April 17, 2017.

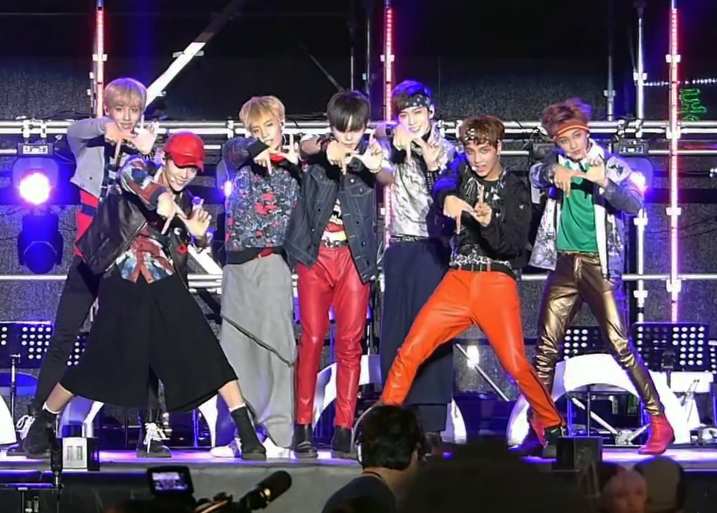
NCT 127's initial seven-member lineup performing in Busan in August 2016

Prior to the unit's debut, several members had solo activities during their time in SM Rookies, including Taeyong's music video for "Open the Door" and feature in Red Velvet's second single "Be Natural" (credited as SR14B's Taeyong) in 2014. Taeyong then joined fellow trainees Johnny, Mark, Donghyuck, Yuta and Jaehyun in the Mnet-produced reality show Exo 90:2014. Doyoung and Jaehyun became fixed MCs for the music show Show Champion from January to June 2015, while Mark and Donghyuck were Mouseketeers on Disney Channel Korea's The Mickey Mouse Club in July 2015. The members eventually had their first official show, titled SMRookies Show, in Seoul in September 2015 and later in Bangkok, Thailand in February 2016. Taeil released his first solo soundtrack "Because Of You" for the television series The Merchant: Gaekju 2015 on January 26, 2016, and Winwin, who appeared as a dancer for the live performance of NCT U's "The 7th Sense" during the sub-unit's first live performance in China at the 16th Music Feng Yun Bang Awards later in April 2016. Along with other SM Rookies trainees, the members starred in their first reality show series, titled NCT Life, in the same month. Taeyong, Taeil, Jaehyun, and Mark—all of whom previously debuted in NCT U—as well as Yuta, Winwin, and Haechan were confirmed to debut in NCT 127, the Seoul-based unit of NCT, on July 1, 2016.

NCT 127 officially debuted with the release of the music video for "Fire Truck" on July 7, 2016, and had their debut performance on Mnet's M Countdown on the same day. They performed the single alongside another promotional song, "Once Again". They released their self-titled extended play (EP) on July 10, 2016. The record was a commercial success, debuting at number two on the Gaon Album Chart and rising to the number one position by the third week of its release, while reaching number two on the Billboard World Albums Chart. In collaboration with Coca-Cola, NCT 127 released the single "Taste the Feeling" under the SM Station project on July 29 while continuing promotions for "Fire Truck" on television music shows such as Music Bank, Show Champion, and Inkigayo. The group then collaborated with the W Korea magazine and modeling agency ESteem for a special performance video, which featured five members (Yuta, Taeyong, Jaehyun, Mark, and Winwin) performing a then-unreleased track, titled "Good Thing". On December 20, NCT 127 released the music video for "Switch", previously issued as a bonus track on NCT #127, which featured other SM Rookies trainees (who were referred to as SR15B at the time of release). The unit was named the Best New Group of 2016 at several music award shows, including Asia Artist Awards, Seoul Music Awards, Golden Disc Awards, Mnet Asian Music Awards and Gaon Chart Music Awards.

=== 2017: New members, breakthrough with Cherry Bomb and Japanese debut ===
On December 27, SM Entertainment confirmed that NCT 127 would release their second EP Limitless in January 2017. The label then announced that new members Johnny and Doyoung would join with NCT 127, becoming a nine-member boy group, with Doyoung having previously debuted with NCT U in April 2016. The group premiered two versions of the EP's eponymous lead single on January 4 and 5, 2017. The EP, released the next day, was commercially successful, becoming NCT 127's second chart-topper on the Gaon Album Chart and their first to reach number one the Billboard World Albums Chart. The lead single also received positive reviews from music critics, hailed by Dazed Digital as one of the top 20 best K-pop songs of 2017, and a fan favorite. Similar to their previous releases, the unit began their promotion cycle for "Limitless" and "Good Thing" on M Countdown on January 5. They released their EP Cherry Bomb on June 14, led by their single of the same name. The release marked NCT 127's breakthrough, with "Cherry Bomb" being their first single to enter the Gaon Digital Chart, peaking at number forty-seven, and earning the group their first music trophy. The song has since become one of the group's signatures and was named by Billboard and Idolator "one of the best K-pop songs of 2017".

In addition to their initial activities in South Korea, NCT 127 promoted overseas with their first live performances at the 2017's KCON music festival in Mexico City, followed by their appearance at the KCON Festivals in Los Angeles and New York City, respectively. They also became the first K-pop act to be introduced as Apple Music's "New Artist of the Week" list, attending and performing at the Apple Store in Williamsburg, Brooklyn on June 25, 2017. The group released a Japanese version of "Limitless" on November 4, 2017, as their debut Japanese single, along with a new music video. In December, after signing with Avex Trax, NCT 127 was confirmed by SM Entertainment to make their official Japanese debut in spring of 2018, accompanied by their first showcase tour.

=== 2018: Empathy project, member lineup adjustments and Regular-Irregular ===
In mid-January 2018, SM Entertainment announced that all current members and units would participate in NCT 2018, a project by parent group NCT. NCT 127 released "Touch" as the fourth single from NCT 2018 Empathy, the studio album that united the existing sub-units of NCT, with different members collaborating under the rotational unit NCT U. The group released their first Japanese EP Chain via Avex Trax on May 23, 2018, which debuted and peaked at number two on the Oricon Albums Chart. Its eponymous second single was also successful, peaking at number twenty-one on the Oricon Singles Chart.

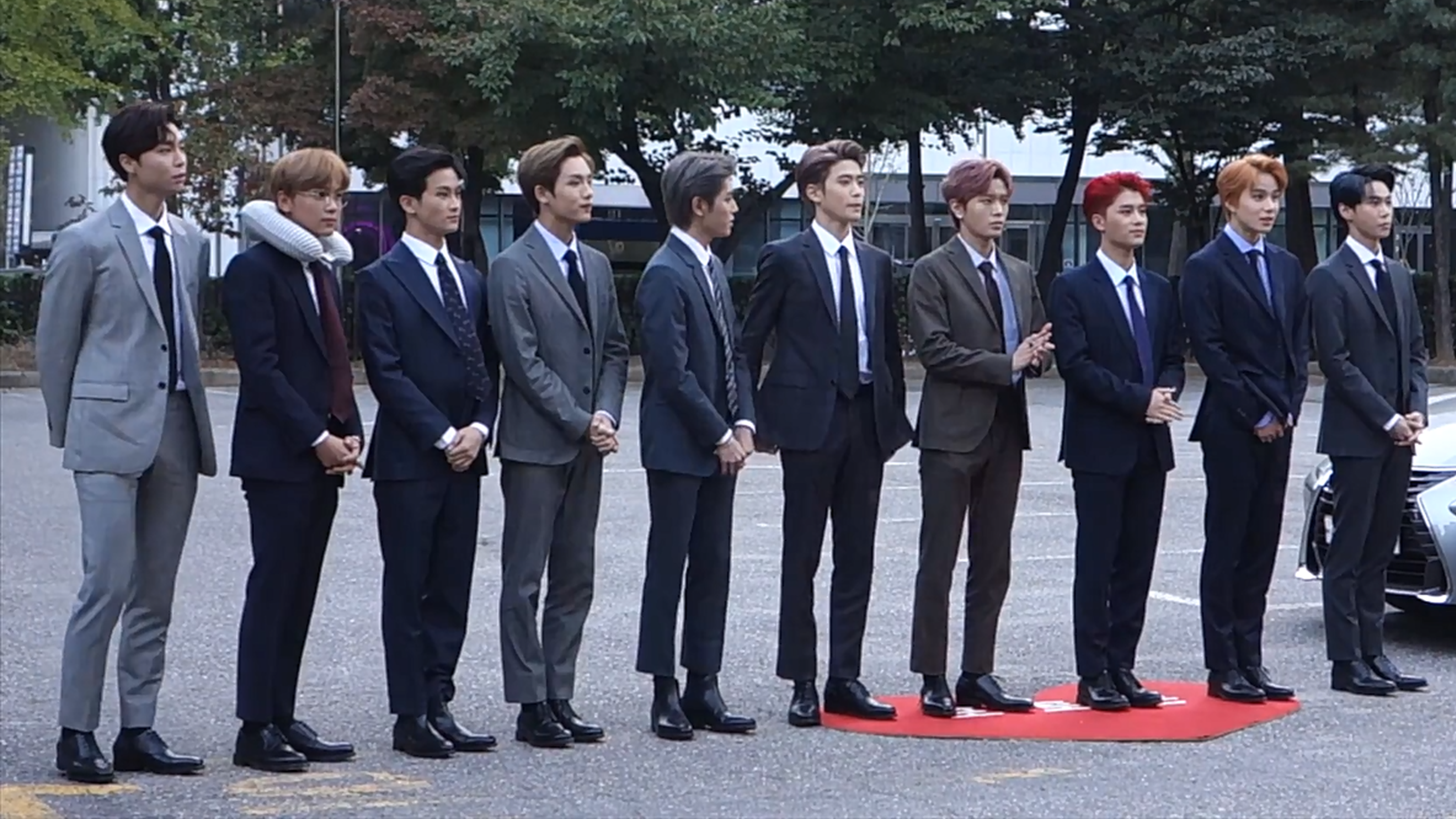
NCT 127 attending Music Bank on October 12, 2018, for their first live performance of "Regular"

On September 17, SM Entertainment introduced a new logo for NCT 127 on all social media platforms. On October 1, they were announced as Apple Music's Up Next Artist of the October, making them as the first K-pop artist to be selected for the series. Along with the release of a new teaser video, the label confirmed that member Jungwoo would officially join the lineup for their upcoming first full-length album, titled Regular-Irregular, on October 12. Jungwoo previously debuted in the rotational unit NCT U for the single "Boss" in February 2018. The album was a commercial success domestically, remaining at number one on the Gaon Album Chart for two weeks and becoming NCT 127's first to receive a Platinum KMCA certificate for selling over 250,000 copies. In addition, the album debuted at number eighty-six on the US Billboard 200, earning the group their first charting title on the chart and leading all ten members to extend their promotions to the United States. In association with their role as one of Apple Music's Up Next artists, album promotions included a group performance of an English version of the lead single "Regular" and "Cherry Bomb" on Jimmy Kimmel Live! as the group's first appearance on US national television. NCT 127 also performed on ABC's Mickey's 90th Spectacular TV special on November 4 and released an Apple Music-exclusive digital EP, Up Next Session: NCT 127, on October 21. The digital EP contained an English version of "Cherry Bomb", remixes for "Fire Truck" and "Regular," and the original song "What We Talkin' Bout" featuring American singer Marteen. NCT 127 re-released Regular-Irregular under the title Regulate on November 23, led by the single "Simon Says". The single was moderately successful in South Korea but experienced greater success in the US, becoming NCT 127's first to top the Billboard World Digital Songs chart and their first to enter the New Zealand Hot 40 Singles chart.

Due to his preparations to debut with China-based sub-unit WayV, member Winwin did not join the group's promotional activities for the release of the repackage. He would not reunite with NCT 127 before his departure from the group in 2026. On December 19, it was announced Haechan would be taking a hiatus from the group due to injury.

=== 2019: First world tour, Awaken and We Are Superhuman ===
In January 2019, NCT 127 announced their first concert tour, Neo City – The Origin, with stops in South Korea and Japan from January to March. The tour was extended to North America, with twelve shows on April and May 2019, and an additional nine in Latin America, Europe and Southeast Asia from May through July 2019. Haechan rejoined the group beginning with the Japan leg of the tour in March 2019. The group featured on Jason Derulo's single "Let's Shut Up & Dance", which was released on February 22, alongside labelmate Lay Zhang. On March 18, NCT 127 released "Wakey-Wakey" as the lead single of their first Japanese studio album, Awaken, which was released on April 17.

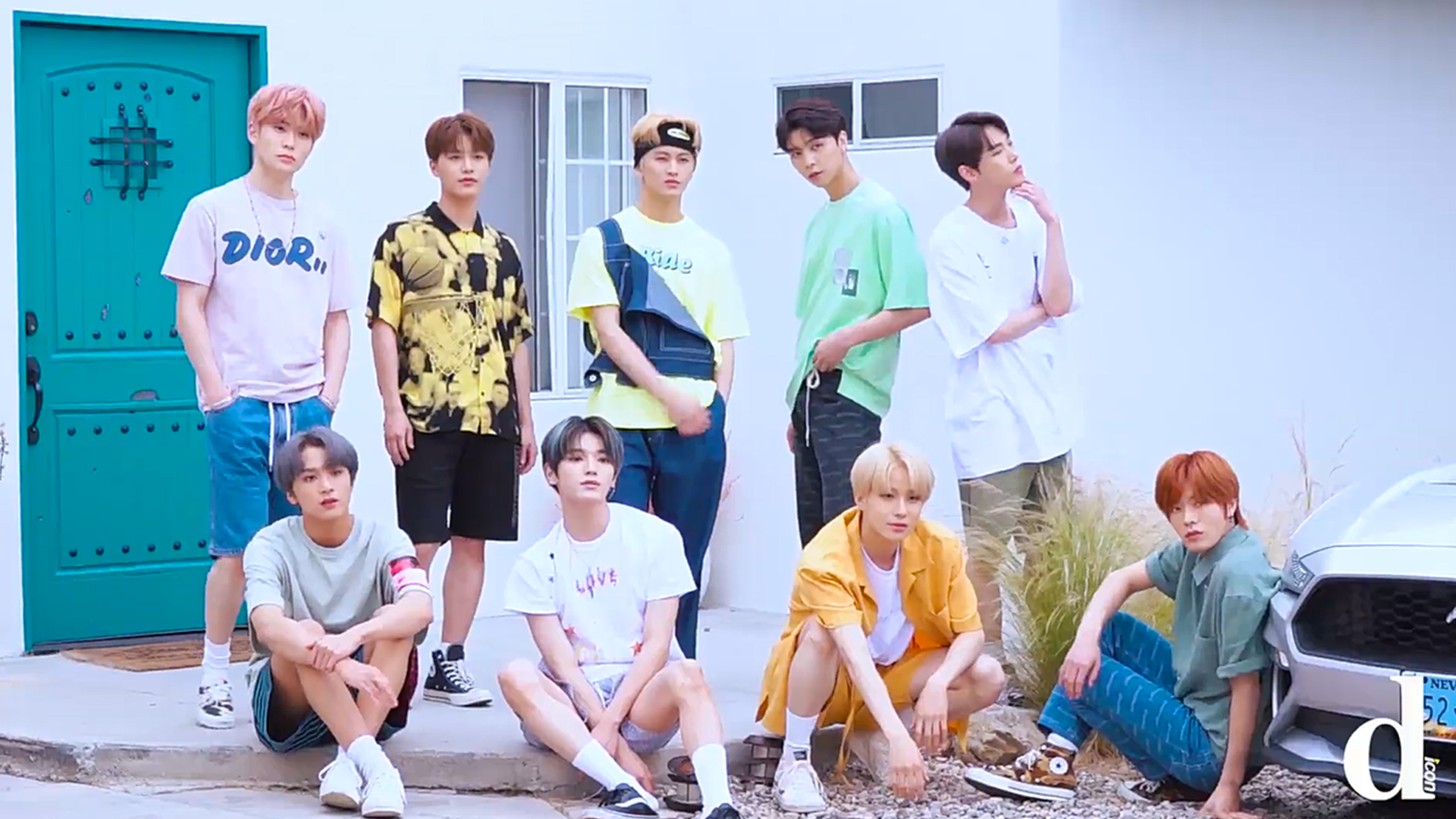
NCT 127 modelling for Korean magazine Dispatch in 2019

In April 2019, NCT 127 signed a worldwide distribution deal with Capitol Music Group and Caroline Distribution via SM Entertainment. Ahead of the North American leg of their tour, the group made appearances on Good Morning America and Strahan and Sara on April 18; they were the third K-pop act to perform on the former. In the same month, the group announced their fourth EP, We Are Superhuman, released on May 24, 2019, and performed once again as a nine-piece group, with Winwin continuing to promote solely as a member of WayV. The group performed the EP's lead single, "Superhuman", on Good Morning America and Strahan and Sara. They also performed the song on The Late Late Show with James Corden on May 14. NCT 127 appeared in the Japanese variety show NCT 127 Teach Me JAPAN!, which began airing on dTV from June 9.

We Are Superhuman debuted at number eleven at the Billboard 200 with 27,000 units, becoming NCT 127's second entry on the chart. The EP also became their second number-one album on the Billboard World Albums chart. An English version of "Highway to Heaven" was released as the EP's second single on July 18, 2019. In August 2019, SM Entertainment announced that Jungwoo would sit out the group's activities for undisclosed health reasons, although the label clarified in November 2019 that his health had been improving and that he may be able to rejoin the group in 2020.

NCT 127 performed as special guests at the 2019 Global Citizen Festival in New York in September 2019. They released their first live album, Neo City: Seoul − The Origin, on October 24, and performed at the 2019 MTV Europe Music Awards in Seville, Spain on November 3, becoming the first K-pop group to do so. NCT 127 also performed at the 2019 Macy's Thanksgiving Day Parade in New York on November 28, making them the first Korean artist to perform at the event, as well as on the program Today on November 29.

=== 2020: Neo Zone and cancelled US arena tour ===
As the group's United States promotional activities for their previous release came to a conclusion by the end of November 2019, NCT 127 released a shortened music video for "Dreams Come True" on their official YouTube channel on January 27. After the announcement of Jungwoo's return, the group released their second Korean studio album, Neo Zone, on March 6, 2020, featuring lead single "Kick It". Several members took part in songwriting for the album. Neo Zone debuted at number five on Billboard 200 with more than 87,000 units sold in the first week. The album sold over 700,000 units in the first month in the US, becoming their best-selling album to date, as well as topping the Korean album sales chart in March.

In addition to promotional activities in South Korea, NCT 127 promoted in the US, beginning with performances at the 2020 RodeoHouston in Houston on March 10, becoming the first K-pop group to perform at the event. They were scheduled to embark on their second tour, Neo Zone – The Awards, in June 2020 in North America, although the tour was indefinitely postponed and later canceled entirely due to concerns over the COVID-19 pandemic.

In April, NCT 127 was chosen as ambassador for Korean cosmetics brand Nature Republic. On May 17, they became the fourth act to hold an online concert, titled "Beyond the Origin" as part of SM Entertainment's Beyond Live online concert series. The concert sold over 104,000 virtual tickets to audience members from 129 countries.

On May 19, the group released Neo Zone: The Final Round, a repackage of Neo Zone. The album was released alongside lead single "Punch", which NCT 127 premiered live during their Beyond Live concert two days prior. Combined sales of Neo Zone and The Final Round exceeded 1.2 million copies, making it the group's best-selling album at the time and their first to exceed one million total sales.

The group reunited with the rest of the NCT members for their second studio album, NCT 2020 Resonance Pt. 1 and NCT 2020 Resonance Pt. 2, released on October 12 and November 23, respectively. NCT 127 recorded the track "Music, Dance" for the album.

=== 2021: Loveholic, Sticker, and second world tour ===
NCT 127 announced in January that they would release their second Japanese EP, Loveholic, on February 17.

On June 4, NCT 127 collaborated with Amoeba Culture to release the digital single "Save".

On June 28, SM released a presentation on the future of the company and the comebacks of their artists. The presentation explained that the group planned to release a third studio album and repackage. At a fanmeet for the group's fifth anniversary, they confirmed the album would have a September release window. Their third Korean studio album, Sticker, was released on September 17. The album consists of eleven tracks, including the lead single of the same name. It achieved 1.13 million pre-orders within the first 24 hours, making it the highest pre-ordered K-pop album in one day. In total, the album recorded 2.2 million pre-orders and sold 2.4 million copies within a week after its release, making it the first album from SM Entertainment to sell over two million copies without a repackage version. Sticker also became the group's highest-ranking album on the Billboard 200 at number three and the highest-ranking K-pop album on the chart in 2021.

NCT 127 released the repackage version of Sticker, Favorite, and its lead single "Favorite (Vampire)" on October 25, 2021. The repackage accumulated 1.06 million copies in pre-order sales and sold over 1.1 million copies in one week after its release. As of November 3, 2021, Sticker and Favorite have sold a combined total of 3.58 million copies, making it the best-selling album by an artist under SM Entertainment.

On December 17, NCT 127 kicked off their second world tour with three shows at Gocheok Sky Dome in Seoul, promoted as NCT 127 2nd Tour 'Neo City: Seoul – The Link'.

=== 2022: 2 Baddies, world tour continuation ===
From May 22 until June 26, NCT 127 continued their world tour with 'Neo City: Japan — The Link'. They performed with five sold-out shows at the Tokyo Dome in Tokyo, the Vantelin Dome in Nagoya, and the Kyocera Dome in Osaka, garnering a total of 220,000 spectators. This marks NCT 127 as the first NCT unit to embark on a dome tour in Japan. They later performed at the Singapore Indoor Stadium in Singapore and at the SM Mall of Asia Arena in Manila, Philippines, earning 12,000 and 15,000 spectators, respectively.

On September 16, NCT 127 made their comeback with their fourth studio album 2 Baddies and its title track. The album sold 1.5 million copies in its first week, becoming the highest-selling debut week by an SM Entertainment act. On the Billboard 200 chart in the United States, the album sold 55,000 copies in its first week and debuted at number three, becoming the group's third album to debut within the top five and their second consecutive album to debut at number three. This makes NCT 127 the second K-pop act to have three albums debut in the Top 5 of the chart, following BTS. 2 Baddies also became the group's highest-charting album in Australia's ARIA Charts, debuting at number three. The album surpassed 3.2 million sales in January 2023 following the release of its reissue titled Ay-Yo, making it NCT 127's second triple-million selling album.

On October 6, NCT 127 held a sold-out concert at the Crypto.com Arena in Los Angeles, as part of the North American leg of Neo City – The Link. They later performed with another sold-out show at the Prudential Center in Newark, New Jersey, on October 13. On October 22 and 23, the group performed with a two-day special concert at the Seoul Olympic Stadium, the largest concert stadium in South Korea. The show, titled Neo City: Seoul – The Link+, featured a new set list that included tracks from 2 Baddies. NCT 127 continued touring in Asia in November and December 2022, playing shows in Jakarta and Bangkok.

=== 2023–present: The Lost Boys documentary, subsequent releases, touring, and member departures ===
In January 2023, they continued their Neo City – The Link tour in North America, performing in Chicago, Houston, and Atlanta. In the same month, they held shows in São Paulo, Brazil, Santiago, Chile, and Bogotá, Colombia, with the lattermost becoming the first large-scale K-pop concert in the country. NCT 127 concluded the tour in Mexico City on January 28. On May 27, NCT 127 headlined the K-pop music festival M(a)y Concert 2023, at the Queen Sirikit National Convention Center in Bangkok. On July 16, they held their seventh anniversary fanmeeting, titled Once Upon A 7uly, at the Jamsil Indoor Stadium in Seoul.

On August 30, 2023, Disney+ released an original documentary series titled NCT 127: The Lost Boys. Containing four episodes, it focuses on the members' childhoods, their personal lives prior to debut, and their perspective on international success. On October 6, NCT 127 released their fifth studio album Fact Check, alongside its title track. On October 16, SM Entertainment announced NCT 127's third world tour, Neo City – The Unity. It will commence with six concerts at the KSPO Dome in Seoul from November 17 until November 26, and will continue in 2024 with a dome tour in Japan.

On July 15, 2024, NCT 127 released their sixth Korean studio album Walk with the lead single of the same name. On August 28, SM announced that Taeil was removed from NCT 127 following sexual offense allegations.

On January 18, 2025, NCT 127 kicked off their fourth world tour, Neo City – The Momentum, with two shows at the Gocheok Sky Dome in Seoul. The concerts were held with only six active members, as Taeyong and Jaehyun were absent due to their mandatory military service. The tour visited major cities across Asia and North America, concluding with two final shows at the Tokyo Dome in Japan on May 21 and 22.

On April 8, 2026, Mark concluded his contract with SM Entertainment, exactly ten years after his debut. The agency stated that the decision followed an "extensive conversations" regarding his future path. In doing so, he also departed from all NCT sub-units, including NCT 127. On July 26, 2026, NCT 127 announced their comeback with Blingy.

== Members ==
=== Current ===
- Taeyong (태용) – leader
- Johnny (쟈니)
- Yuta (유타)
- Jaehyun (재현)
- Haechan (해찬)

=== Inactive ===
- Doyoung (도영) (Note: Inactive to due military enlistment.)
- Jungwoo (정우)

=== Former ===
- Taeil (태일)
- Winwin (윈윈)
- Mark (마크)

== Artistry ==
=== Musical style ===
NCT 127's music incorporates genres such as hip hop, R&B, and EDM. Their most prominent style is experimental hip-hop, which the members describe as "neo", in reference to NCT's name, Neo Culture Technology. Their hip hop-based experimental singles include the hardcore hip hop "Cherry Bomb", the Latin-inspired hip hop "Regular", the "powerful" hip hop and R&B "Kick It", and the critically polarizing, minimal hip hop "Sticker". They frequently collaborate with American producer Dem Jointz, who has composed many of their lead singles alongside South Korean songwriter Yoo Young-jin. Gelene Penalosa of POP! dubbed NCT 127 the "K-pop's kings of noise music" after noting the increasing prominence of experimental music among fourth generation K-pop groups.

=== Choreography ===
NCT 127's choreography has been noted for its intensity and complexity, and the members' synchronized dance moves across different styles have received praise. Tim Chan of Rolling Stone described their choreography as "difficult for even professional dance troupes to master."

== Discography ==
Korean albums

- Regular-Irregular (2018)
- Neo Zone (2020)
- Sticker (2021)
- 2 Baddies (2022)
- Fact Check (2023)
- Walk (2024)
- Blingy (2026)

Japanese albums

- Awaken (2019)

== Tours ==
- Neo City – The Origin (2019–2020)
- Neo City – The Link (2021–2023)
- Neo City – The Unity (2023–2024)
- Neo City – The Momentum (2025)
- Neo City – The Redline (2026–2027)

== Awards and nominations ==
In 2016 and 2017, NCT 127 received "Best New Artist" awards from the Mnet Asian Music Awards, Golden Disk Awards and Seoul Music Awards. In 2022, they won the Grand Prize (Korean: 대상 Daesang) award at the 31st Seoul Music Awards for the commercial success of Sticker, becoming the first NCT sub-unit to win a daesang from a major award show.
