= 2025 SM Town: The Culture, the Future =

- Digital cover

Studio album by SM Town
- Released: February 14, 2025
- Studio: SM Studios (Seoul)
- Genre: K-pop
- Length: 61:31
- Language: Korean
- Label: SM
- Producers: 2Spade; Haeil; Hitchhiker; Hyun; Hyun Jin-young; Imlay; Jo In-woo; Jo Seong-tae; Kang Han-mwi; Kenzie; Keymaker; Lee Kwang-il; Lee Tak; Mar Vista; MCK (Artiffect); MinGtion; Moonshine; Moon Hee-jun; No2zcat; No Identity; Park Moon-chi; PixelWave; Shaun; Simon Petren; Siwore (Artiffect); Xydo; Yoo Young-jin

SM Town chronology
2022 Winter SM Town: SMCU Palace (2022)	2025 SM Town: The Culture, the Future (2025)

Singles from 2025 SM Town: The Culture, the Future
- 1. "Hug" Released: January 8, 2025; 2. "Miracle" Released: January 22, 2025; 3. "Thank You" Released: February 14, 2025

2025 SM Town: The Culture, the Future (stylized as 2025 SMTOWN : THE CULTURE, THE FUTURE) is the tenth special album and sixteenth overall by SM Town. It was released by SM Entertainment on February 14, 2025, as part of the label's 30th anniversary celebration. The album contains seventeen tracks, including the new song "Thank You" and various SM Entertainment cover songs performed by different artists from the label.

== Background and release ==
In November 2024, SM Entertainment announced their anniversary concert, SM Town Live 2025: The Culture, the Future, which took place on January 11 and 12, 2025, at the Gocheok Sky Dome.

On January 8, 2025, Riize released a cover of TVXQ's 2003 debut song "Hug", serving as the lead single for the then-upcoming SMTOWN anniversary album. A few days later, on January 10, 2025, SM Entertainment officially confirmed that the special album titled 2025 SMTOWN: The Culture, the Future would be released on February 14, 2025, as part of the company's 30th anniversary celebration. On January 22, 2025, the second single from the anniversary album was released. NCT Wish covered Super Junior's 2005 song "Miracle".

The album was released on February 14, 2025, alongside the music video for its title track, "Thank You." It also marks the first full-group release by Girls' Generation since their 2022 album Forever 1. The group participated in the track "My Everything".

Participating artists in the album include Kangta, BoA, TVXQ!, Super Junior (except Heechul among the actively-promoting members), Girls' Generation, Shinee (except Taemin), Suho and Chanyeol from Exo, Red Velvet, NCT (except Taeyong and Winwin), Aespa, Riize, Naevis, Lucas, the ScreaM Records DJs: Imlay, Mar Vista, and 2Spade, and the SM Classics Town Orchestra. Artists such as Onew from Shinee, Wendy from Red Velvet, Jaehyun and Riku from NCT, and Lucas only partipcated in the album's photoshoot.

== Track listing ==
2025 SM Town: The Culture, The Future track listing
No.	Title	Lyrics	Music	Arrangement	Length
1.	"Thank You" (performed by SM Town)	Kenzie	Kenzie; Andrew Choi; No2zcat; Jsong; Kim Yoo-hyun	Kenzie; No2zcat	3:46
2.	"Miracle" (performed by NCT Wish)	Yoon Hyo-sang	Daniel Pandher; Tommy La Verdi	Kenzie	2:57
3.	"Hug" (포옹; performed by Riize)	Yoon Jung; Park Chang-hyun	Park Chang-hyun	Park Moon-chi	3:54
4.	"Rum Pum Pum Pum" (첫 사랑니; performed by Aespa)	Jun Gan-di	Erik Lewander; Iggy Strange Dahl; Ylva Dimberg; Anne Judith Wik	No Identity; Waker (153/Joombas)	3:30
5.	"Run Devil Run" (performed by Red Velvet)	Hong Ji-yoo	Michael Busbee; Alex James; Kalle Engström	Simon Petren	3:37
6.	"Git It Up!" (투지 (鬪志); performed by Exo)	Moon Hee-jun	Moon Hee-jun	Moon Hee-jun; PixelWave; Haeil; Xydo	3:00
7.	"Love Me Right" (performed by NCT Dream)	Oh Yoo-won; Kim Dong-hyun; Mark	Denzil "DR" Remedios; Nermin Harambašić; Courtney Jenaé Stahl; Peter Tambakis; Ryan S. Jhun; Jarah Gibson	Imlay	3:44
8.	"Juliette" (줄리엣; performed by WayV)	Jonghyun; Minho	Mikkel Remee Sigvardt; Jay Sean; Mich Hansen; Joseph Belmaati	Shaun	3:28
9.	"You in Vague Memory" (흐린 기억 속의 그대; performed by NCT 127)	Lee Tak; Hyun Jin-young	Lee Tak; Hyun Jin-young	Lee Tak; Hyun Jin-young; PixelWave; Haeil; Xydo	4:18
10.	"My Everything" (열정; performed by Girls' Generation)	Yoo Young-jin	Jens Thoresen; Maria Haukaas Storeng; Yoo Young-jin	MinGtion	5:04
11.	"I Pray 4 U" (performed by Super Junior)	Young-hu Kim; Eric Mun; Song Chae-ri (Artiffect)	Young-hu Kim; William Pyon	MCK (Artiffect); Siwore (Artiffect)	3:24
12.	"Psycho" (performed by TVXQ!)	Kenzie	Cazzi Opeia; Ejae; Andrew "Druski" Scott; Kyle Wong	Moonshine; Yoo Young-jin	3:36
13.	"Just a Feeling" (performed by Kangta)	Jeon Seung-woo	Kim Do-hoon	Keymaker; Hyun	2:49
14.	"Game" (performed by Naevis)	Kim Boo-min	Hitchhiker	Hitchhiker; Imlay	3:24
15.	"View" (performed by Shinee and ScreaM Records)	Jonghyun	LDN Noise; Ryan S. Jhun; Adrian McKinnon	Mar Vista; Imlay; 2Spade	3:04
16.	"My Name" (performed by SM Classics Town Orchestra)		Kenzie	Kang Han-mwi; Kang Sang-eon; Jo In-woo; Lee Kwang-il; Kim Young-sang	3:12
17.	"End of a Day" (하루의 끝; performed by BoA)	Jonghyun	Jonghyun; Wefreaky	Jo Seong-tae	4:50
Total length:					61:31

Notes

- "Thank You" is performed by Kangta, BoA, U-Know Yunho, Max Changmin, Leeteuk, Ryeowook, Taeyeon, Hyoyeon, Key, Minho, Suho, Chanyeol, Seulgi, Joy, Doyoung, Ten, Mark, Haechan, Jeno, Yangyang, Karina, Winter, Wonbin, Sohee, Sion, and Yushi.
- "Miracle" is performed only by members Sion, Yushi, Jaehee, Ryo, and Sakuya.
- "Run Devil Run" is performed only by members Irene, Seulgi, Joy, and Yeri.
- "Git It Up!" is performed only by members Suho and Chanyeol.
- "I Pray 4 U" is performed only by members Leeteuk, Yesung, Shindong, Eunhyuk, Donghae, Siwon, Ryeowook, and Kyuhyun.
- "Julliete" is performed only by members Kun, Ten, Xiaojun, Hendery, and Yangyang.
- "You in Vague Memory" is performed only by members Johnny, Yuta, Doyoung, Jungwoo, Mark, and Haechan.

== Credits and personnel ==
Credits adapted from the album's liner notes.

Studio

- SM Droplet Studio – recording (1, 7, 12), digital editing (12)
- SM Yellow Tail Studio – recording (1, 3–4, 8, 13, 15), digital editing (1, 4, 8, 13), engineered for mix (1, 8, 13)
- SM Starlight Studio – recording (1), digital editing (17), mixing (5, 10)
- SM Aube Studio – recording (1, 3, 5, 7, 9), digital editing (7), engineered for mix (7, 9)
- SM LVYIN Studio – recording (2, 9), digital editing (2–3, 16), engineered for mix (2–3)
- SM Wavelet Studio – recording (5–6, 8, 10–11), digital editing (10–11), engineered for mix (5, 11)
- SM Big Shot Studio – recording (6, 10), digital editing (6, 15), engineered for mix (6)
- Seoul Studio – recording (10, 16–17)
- Sound Pool Studio – recording (14), digital editing (8, 14)
- SM Blue Ocean Studio – recording (15), mixing (2, 11, 13, 17)
- SM Blue Cup Studio – recording (15, 17), mixing (6–7, 9)
- SM Azure Studio – digital editing (5)
- Doobdoob Studio – digital editing (7, 9, 12)
- Klang Studio – engineered for mix, mixing (12)
- SM Concert Hall Studio – mixing (1, 3–4, 8, 16)
- 821 Sound – mastering (1–14, 16–17)
- Boost Knob – mastering (15)

Personnel

- NCT Wish
  - Sion – vocals (1–2), background vocals (1)
  - Yushi – vocals (1–2), background vocals (1–2)
  - Jaehee – vocals (2), background vocals (2)
  - Ryo – vocals (2)
  - Sakuya – vocals (2)
- Riize
  - Shotaro – vocals (3), background vocals (3)
  - Eunseok – vocals (3), background vocals (3)
  - Sungchan – vocals (3), background vocals (3)
  - Wonbin – vocals (1, 3), background vocals (3)
  - Sohee – vocals (1, 3), background vocals (1, 3)
  - Anton – vocals (3), background vocals (3)
- Aespa
  - Karina – vocals (1, 4), background vocals (1, 4)
  - Giselle – vocals (4), background vocals (4)
  - Winter – vocals (1, 4), background vocals (4)
  - Ningning – vocals (4), background vocals (4)
- Red Velvet
  - Irene – vocals (5), background vocals (5)
  - Seulgi – vocals (1, 5), background vocals (1, 5)
  - Joy – vocals (1, 5), background vocals (1, 5)
  - Yeri – vocals (5), background vocals (5)
- Exo
  - Suho – vocals (1, 6), background vocals (6)
  - Chanyeol – vocals (1, 6), background vocals (6)
- NCT Dream
  - Mark – vocals (1, 7, 9)
  - Renjun – vocals (7)
  - Jeno – vocals (1, 7)
  - Haechan – vocals (1, 7, 9)
  - Jaemin – vocals (7)
  - Chenle – vocals (7)
  - Jisung – vocals (7)
- WayV
  - Kun – vocals (8)
  - Ten – vocals (1, 8), background vocals (1)
  - Xiaojun – vocals (8)
  - Hendery – vocals (8)
  - Yangyang – vocals (1, 8), background vocals (1)
- NCT 127
  - Johnny – vocals (9)
  - Yuta – vocals (9)
  - Doyoung – vocals (1, 9)
  - Jungwoo – vocals (9)
- Girls' Generation
  - Taeyeon – vocals (1, 10), background vocals (1, 10)
  - Sunny – vocals (10), background vocals (10)
  - Tiffany – vocals (10), background vocals (10)
  - Hyoyeon – vocals (1, 10), background vocals (10)
  - Yuri – vocals (10), background vocals (10)
  - Sooyoung – vocals (10), background vocals (10)
  - Yoona – vocals (10), background vocals (10)
  - Seohyun – vocals (10), background vocals (10)
- Super Junior
  - Leeteuk – vocals (1, 11)
  - Yesung – vocals (11)
  - Shindong – vocals (11)
  - Eunhyuk – vocals (11)
  - Siwon – vocals (11)
  - Donghae – vocals (11)
  - Ryeowook – vocals (1, 11)
  - Kyuhyun – vocals (11)
- TVXQ
  - U-Know Yunho – vocals (1, 12)
  - Max Changmin – vocals (1, 12), background vocals (1)
- Kangta – vocals (1, 13), background vocals (13)
- Naevis – vocals, background vocals (14)
- Shinee
  - Onew – vocals (15), background vocals (15)
  - Jonghyun – vocals (15), background vocals (15)
  - Key – vocals (1, 15), background vocals (15)
  - Minho – vocals (15), background vocals (1, 15)
  - Taemin – vocals (15), background vocals (15)
- SM Classics Town Orchestra – performer (16), strings (10, 17)
- BoA – vocals (1, 17), background vocals (1), vocal directing (17)
- Kenzie – producer (1–2, 16), vocal directing (1–2), background vocals (2)
- Andrew Choi – background vocals (2, 8, 12)
- No2zcat – producer (1), bass (1), synthesizer (1)
- Kim Yoo-hyun – guitar (1–2)
- Park Moon-chi – producer (3), vocal directing (3), piano (3)
- No Identity – producer (4)
- Simon Petren – producer (5), piano (5)
- Moon Hee-jun – producer (6)
- PixelWave – producer (6, 9), guitar (6, 9), keyboard (6, 9), vocal directing (9)
- Haeil – producer (6, 9), background vocals (6, 9), vocal directing (1, 9)
- Xydo – producer (6, 9), background vocals (6, 9), vocal directing (9)
- Imlay – producer (7, 14–15), bass (7), piano (7), synthesizer (7), engineered for mix (14), mixing (15)
- Shaun – producer (8), bass (8), guitar (8), synthesizer (8)
- Hyun Jin-young – producer (9)
- Yoo Young-jin – producer (10, 12)
- MinGtion – producer (10), bass (10), piano (10)
- MCK (Artiffect) – producer (11), piano (11), synthesizer (11)
- Siwore (Artiffect) – producer (11), piano (11), synthesizer (11)
- Moonshine – producer (12)
- Keymaker – producer (13)
- Hyun – producer (13), background vocals (7, 11, 13)
- Hitchhiker – producer (14), mixing (14), vocal directing (15)
- Mar Vista – producer (15), mixing (15)
- 2Spade – producer (15), mixing (15)
- Kang Han-mwi – producer (16), orchestration (16)
- Kang Sang-eon – orchestration (16)
- Jo In-woo – producer (16), orchestration (16)
- Lee Kwang-il – producer (16), orchestration (16)
- Kim Young-sang – orchestration (16)
- Jo Seong-tae – producer (17), piano (17), strings arrangement (17), strings recording directing (17)
- Maxx Song – vocal directing (1, 12)
- Jake K (Artiffect) – vocal directing (1, 5, 12)
- Eldon – background vocals (3)
- Emily Yeonseo Kim – vocal directing (4, 10)
- Une – background vocals (5)
- Ju Chan-yang (Pollen) – vocal directing (6)
- G-High – vocal directing (7)
- Young Chance – vocal directing (7)
- Noday – vocal directing (8)
- Lee Ye-joon – background vocals (10)
- Paprikaa – vocal directing (11)
- Corbin – vocal directing (13)
- Kim Jin-hwan – vocal directing (15)
- Park Han-jin – bass (3)
- Koo Young-jun – guitar (3)
- Jeong Won-jun – guitar (10)
- Han Seong-eun (AimStrings) – strings conducting, strings arrangement (10)
- Moon Jung-jae – recording directing, piano (16), strings recording directing (17)
- Lee Jong-han – orchestral programming (16)
- Shin Sung-jin – strings arrangement (17)
- Kim Joo-hyun – recording (1, 7, 12), digital editing (12)
- Noh Min-ji – recording (1, 3–4, 8, 13), digital editing (1, 4, 8, 13), engineered for mix (1, 8, 13)
- Jeong Yoo-ra – recording (1), digital editing (17), mixing (5, 10)
- Kim Hyo-joon – recording (1, 3, 5, 7, 9), digital editing (7), engineered for mix (7, 9)
- Lee Ji-hong – recording (2, 9), digital editing (2–3, 16), engineered for mix (2–3)
- Kang Eun-ji – recording (5–6, 8, 10–11), digital editing (10–11), engineered for mix (5, 11)
- Lee Min-kyu – recording (6, 10, 15), digital editing (6, 15), engineered for mix (6)
- Jeong Ki-hong – recording (10, 16–17)
- Choi Da-in – recording (10, 16–17)
- Lee Chan-mi – recording (10, 16–17)
- Woo Min-jeong – recording (14)
- Kim Cheol-sun – recording (15), mixing (2, 11, 13, 17)
- Koo Jong-pil – recording (15), mixing (12)
- Jung Eui-seok – recording (15, 17), mixing (6–7, 9)
- Kim Jae-yeon – digital editing (5)
- Eugene Kwon – digital editing (7, 9, 12)
- Jeong Ho-jin – digital editing (8, 14)
- Hong Jang-mi – engineered for mix (12)
- AudAI – engineered for mix (14)
- Nam Koong-jin – mixing (1, 3–4, 8, 16)
- Kwon Nam-woo – mastering (1–14, 16–17)
- Park Kyung-sun – mastering (15)

== Charts ==
=== Weekly charts ===
Weekly chart performance for 2025 SM Town: The Culture, the Future
Chart (2025)	Peak position
Japanese Albums (Oricon)	42
South Korean Albums (Circle)	4

=== Monthly charts ===
Monthly chart performance for 2025 SM Town: The Culture, the Future
Chart (2025)	Peak position
South Korean Albums (Circle)	12

== Release history ==
Release history for 2025 SM Town: The Culture, the Future
Region	Date	Format(s)	Label(s)	Ref.
Various	February 14, 2025	Digital download; streaming	SM	
South Korea	February 14, 2025	CD; NFC	SM; Kakao	
South Korea	May 11, 2025	LP	SM; Kakao	
