= Synk: Complaexity (single album) =

Single album by Aespa
- Released: September 14, 2026
- Genres: Dance; R&B; Ballad
- Length: 14:41
- Language: English
- Labels: SM; Kakao

Aespa chronology
| Synk: Aexis Line 2026 (2026) | Synk: Complaexity (2026) |

Synk: Complaexity (Note: Also titled Synk: Complaexity – 2026 Special Digital Single) is the fourth special digital single album and fifth overall by South Korean girl group Aespa. It was released by SM Entertainment on September 14, 2026, and contains four tracks that were previously performed on their Synk: Complaexity tour.

== Background and release ==
In August 2026, Aespa began to their fourth concert tour Synk: Complaexity, at the Gocheok Sky Dome in Seoul, South Korea. During the concerts, they premiered four new solo songs performed by each of the members.

On September 11, SM Entertainment announced that the songs would be released on digital and streaming platforms on September 14.

== Composition ==
Synk: Complaexity contains four tracks. The first track, "16 Bit", performed by Karina, is an R&B dance song characterized by a subdued synth sound and a heavy groove. Karina participated in writing the lyrics, which compare moments of a blurred inner self to pixels that continuously break apart and reconnect. The second track, "Saddle Up", performed by Winter, is an R&B dance song featuring a groovy instrumental and rhythmic topline. Its lyrics convey a confident and proactive attitude, emphasizing sincerity through actions rather than words.

The third track, "BYEB4HELLO", performed by Giselle, written and composed by Giselle, is characterized by bright energy and a contrasting twist. The lyrics express longing for another person despite knowing that the relationship cannot be fulfilled. The last track, "I Love You But I Gotta Let You Go", performed by Ningning, is a ballad featuring a prominent string arrangement. Ningning participated in both its composition and lyric writing, with the lyrics depicting the emotions of having to let go of someone she loves.

== Track listing ==
Track listing adapted from Melon

Synk: Aexis Line 2026 track listing
| No. | Title | Lyrics | Music | Arrangement | Length |
|---|---|---|---|---|---|
| 1. | "16 Bit" (Sung by Karina) | Chloë Black; IKKI; Karina | Kieran Watters; Chloë Black; Imlay; IKKI | The Idiot; Imlay | 3:48 |
| 2. | "Saddle Up" (Sung by Winter) | James G. Morales; Matt Morales; Nina Ann Nelson | James G. Morales; Matt Morales; Nina Ann Nelson | The Elev3n | 3:50 |
| 3. | "BYEB4HELLO" (Sung by Giselle) | Giselle | Giselle; Shintaro Yasuda; Zayok | Shintaro Yasuda; Lucian; Clayco | 3:27 |
| 4. | "I Love You But I Gotta Let You Go" (Sung by Ningning) | Kyle Buckley; Jonathan Bach; Chloe Angelides; Ningning | Kyle Buckley; Jonathan Bach; Chloe Angelides; Ningning | Pink Slip | 3:36 |
| Total length: | | | | | 14:41 |

== Release history ==
Release history for Synk: Complaexity
| Region | Date | Format | Label |
|---|---|---|---|
| Various | September 14, 2026 | Digital download; streaming | SM; Kakao |
