= Teto-egen test =

Personality test

The teto-egen test (Korean: 테토·에겐) is a self-reported personality test that classifies people into teto and egen types largely based on masculinity and femininity, respectively. The terms are derived from the hormones testosterone and estrogen and are used to gauge "interpersonal styles and energy types" with regard to gendered archetypes.

Like the Myers–Briggs Type Indicator test, the teto-egen test has become popular in South Korea during the 2020s—specifically among Generation Z—to assess personal identity and romantic compatibility. However, it has also been criticized and cautioned against by psychologists for potentially being reductionist and stereotypical.

== Types ==
Contrary to its definition, the teto-egen test isn't gender-specific; any individual, of any gender, can be classified into either a teto or egen type. According to The Straits Times, "a teto man is masculine and athletic, while an egen man is gentle and appearance-conscious. A teto woman is expressive and extroverted, whereas an egen woman is reserved and traditionally feminine."

== Usages ==
As of July 2025, over a million people have reportedly taken teto-egen tests online.

In addition to MBTI tests, as well as attachment types, some South Koreans have used their egen-teto results in their dating lives to further assess romantic compatibility with others.

== In popular culture ==
In 2025, Korean liquor company Ayoung FBC announced that it would begin curating its wines online and in-store through the words "ogen," or estrogen, and "tetto," or testosterone.

During the final episode of its second season, Saturday Night Live Korea satirized the rising popularity of the teto-egen test through a parody skit titled "When a Teto Man Falls in Love." In the skit, BtoB's Yook Sung-jae plays an egen man who is broken up with by his teto girlfriend, the latter of whom then pursues a more egen boyfriend, after which Yook's character "undergoes a brutal teto transformation."

Some publications, like Cosmopolitan Taiwan, have written articles about how to apply makeup toward teto and egen styles, while others, like Elle Taiwan, have sought to classify certain celebrities in East Asia along teto and egen types.

K-pop fans have begun using the teto-egen test to analyze their favorite idols. For instance, aespa's Winter has been described as a "teto woman," while her fellow member Karina has been described as an "egen woman." Members of Twice have also participated in the trend, with Elle Taiwan describing Nayeon as a "teto girl" in a July 2025 Instagram Reel skit with Momo and Jihyo.

== Criticisms ==
Some psychologists, including professors at Seoul National University and Dankook University, warned that "such identity tests risk reinforcing oversimplified binaries. Framing behavior and traits in terms of gendered hormones can make stereotypes further entrenched." In particular, Dankook University professor Lim Myung-ho stated, "Blindly believing in these tests can lead to overgeneralization and binary thinking. Identity tests should be treated lightly and used for reference only."
