= Synk: Aexis Line 2026 =

Single album by Aespa
- Released: August 9, 2026
- Genres: EDM; R&B
- Length: 6:42
- Language: English
- Labels: SM; Kakao

Aespa chronology
Kiss n Tell (2026)	Synk: Aexis Line 2026 (2026)	Synk: Complaexity (2026)

Synk: Aexis Line 2026 (Note: Also titled Synk: Aexis Line – 2026 Special Digital Single) is the third special digital single album and fourth overall by South Korean girl group Aespa. It was released by SM Entertainment on August 9, 2026, and contains two tracks that were previously performed on their 2026 leg of Synk: Aexis Line tour.

== Background and release ==
In April 2026, Aespa held the final leg of their Synk: Aexis Line tour in Osaka and Tokyo, Japan. During the concerts, they premiered two new unit songs, performed by Karina and Winter, and Giselle and Ningning, respectively.

Later that month, SM Entertainment announced Aespa's new concert tour, Synk: Complaexity, which began with two shows at Gocheok Sky Dome in Seoul, South Korea, on August 7 and 8. During the opening shows, the unit songs were performed again as part of the set list. On August 9, SM Entertainment announced that the songs would be released on digital and streaming platforms later that day.

== Composition ==
Synk: Aexis Line 2026 contains two tracks. The first track, "Serenade", performed by Karina and Winter, was described as an EDM dance track characterized by synth lines and vocal chops. Its lyrics convey a confident message about enjoying one's life without being constrained by the opinions of others. The second track, "Lollipop", performed by Giselle and Ningning, was described as an R&B track with a dreamy atmosphere. Written and composed by Giselle and Ningning, the song's lyrics express their affection for each other.

== Track listing ==
Synk: Aexis Line 2026 track listing
No.	Title	Lyrics	Music	Arrangement	Length
1.	"Serenade" (Sung by Karina and Winter)	Frankie Day; Joowon	Dennis Neuer; Nina Katrin Kaiser; Nikolay Mohr	Dennis Neuer; Nikolay Mohr	3:05
2.	"Lollipop" (Sung by Giselle and Ningning)	Shintaro Yasuda; Giselle; Ningning	Shintaro Yasuda; Giselle; Ningning	Shintaro Yasuda	3:37
Total length:					6:42

== Credits and personnel ==
Credits adapted from the single's liner notes, provided from Melon.

Studio

- SM Wavelet Studio – recording (all tracks), digital editing (track 1)
- SM Dorii Studio – digital editing (track 2)
- SM Blue Ocean Studio – mixing (track 1)
- SM Big Shot Studio – mixing (track 2)
- 821 Sound – mastering (all tracks)

Personnel

- SM Entertainment – executive producer
- Aespa
  - Karina – vocals (track 1)
  - Giselle – vocals, lyrics, composition, background vocals (track 2)
  - Winter – vocals, background vocals (track 1)
  - Ningning – vocals, lyrics, composition, background vocals (track 2)
- Frankie Day – lyrics (track 1)
- Joowon – lyrics, vocal directing (track 1)
- Dennis Neuer – producer, composition, arrangement (track 1)
- Nina Katrin Kaiser – composition, background vocals (track 1)
- Nikolay Mohr – producer, composition, arrangement (track 1)
- Shintaro Yasuda – producer, lyrics, composition, arrangement, background vocals (track 2)
- Emily Yeonseo Kim – vocal directing (track 2), background vocals (track 1)
- Kang Eun-ji – recording (all tracks), digital editing (track 1)
- Jeong Jae-won – digital editing (track 2)
- Kim Cheol-sun – mixing (track 1)
- Lee Min-kyu – mixing (track 2)
- Kwon Nam-woo – mastering (all tracks)

== Release history ==
Release history for Synk: Aexis Line 2026
Region	Date	Format	Label
Various	August 9, 2026	Digital download; streaming	SM; Kakao
