= SM Town Live 2022: SMCU Express at Kwangya =

2022 online live concert by SM Entertainment artists

- Online live concert by SM Entertainment artists
- Promotional poster
- Location: Worldwide
- Associated album: 2021 Winter SMTOWN: SMCU Express
- Date: January 1, 2022
- Duration: Est. 300 minutes
- No. of shows: 1
- Attendance: 51 million

SM Entertainment artists concert chronology
- SM Town Live "Culture Humanity" (2021); SM Town Live 2022: SMCU Express at Kwangya (2022); SM Town Live 2022: SMCU Express (2022)

SM Town Live 2022: SMCU Express at Kwangya (stylized as SMTOWN LIVE 2022: SMCU EXPRESS @ KWANGYA) was an online live concert held on January 1, 2022, by SM Entertainment. Similar to the 2021-new-year online concert SMTOWN Live "Culture Humanity", the concert was broadcast free of charge online through various streaming platforms and selected broadcasting networks in selected countries.

== Background ==
On December 10, 2021, SM Entertainment announced that it would be releasing a winter album titled 2021 Winter SM Town: SMCU Express. In the same announcement, it was also announced that a free-to-watch live online concert will also be held on January 1, 2022. The lineup consisting of Kangta, BoA, TVXQ, Super Junior, Taeyeon and Hyoyeon of Girls' Generation, Onew, Key, and Minho of Shinee, Kai of Exo, Red Velvet, NCT U, NCT 127, NCT Dream, WayV, Aespa, Ginjo, Imlay, and Raiden was announced on December 23, 2021. On December 27, 2021, it was announced newly formed supergroup Got the Beat will make their debut at the concert. On December 30, 2021, J.E.B, Minimonster, Mar Vista, and Hitchhiker was added to the performers lineup. In addition, it was announced Changmin would be performing a preview of "Fever" from his upcoming album prior to the actual release. On January 24, Beyond LIVE and U+ Idol Live announced the concert will be re-streamed on January 29, 2022.

== Performers ==
| No. | Artist | Song(s) performed | Ref. |
|---|---|---|---|
| 1 | TVXQ | "Rising Sun" | |
| 2 | Aespa | "Black Mamba" (Orchestra ver.) | |
| 3 | NCT Dream | "Hello Future" | |
| 4 | Red Velvet | "Psycho" | |
| 5 | NCT 127 | "Favorite (Vampire)" | |
| 6 | Kai | "Mmmh" | |
| 7 | Key (featuring Taeyeon) | "Hate That..." | |
| 8 | Taeil, Kyuhyun, Onew | "Ordinary Day" | |
| 9 | Wendy | "Like Water" | |
| 10 | Kangta | "Free To Fly 2021" (자유롭게 날 수 있도록 2021) + "Maybe" (아마) | |
| 11 | WayV – Kun & Xiaojun | "Back to You" (English version) | |
| 12 | Joy | "Hello" | |
| 13 | Onew (featuring Ningning) | "Way" | |
| 14 | Hyoyeon (featuring Giselle) | "Second" | |
| 15 | Taeyong, Jeno, Hendery, Giselle, and Yangyang | "Zoo" | |
| 16 | SM Town | "Dear My Family" | |
| 17 | Super Junior | "The Crown" + "Burn the Floor" + "Black Suit" + "Mamacita" + "Devil" | |
| 18 | U-Know | "Thank U" | |
| 19 | Minho | "Heartbreak" | |
| 20 | Aespa | "Next Level" | |
| 21 | BoA | "Woman" | |
| 22 | Kai | "Peaches" | |
| 23 | Key | "Bad Love" | |
| 24 | Max Changmin | "Fever" | |
| 25 | Aespa | "Dreams Come True" | |
| 26 | Red Velvet | "Pose" | |
| 27 | Hyoyeon (featuring Yangyang) | "Dessert" | |
| 28 | Taeyeon | "Weekend" | |
| 29 | BoA (Note: Featuring NCT's Shotaro for choreography performance.) | "Only One" | |
| 30 | Got the Beat | "Step Back" | |
| 31 | NCT U | "Universe (Let's Play Ball)" | |
| 32 | NCT 2021 | "Beautiful" | |
| 33 | Aespa | "Savage" | |
| 34 | NCT Dream | "Hot Sauce" | |
| 35 | Red Velvet | "Queendom" | |
| 36 | NCT 127 | "Sticker" | |
| 37 | Super Junior | "House Party" | |
| 38 | BoA | "Better" | |
| 39 | TVXQ | "Catch Me" | |
| 40 | SM Town | "Hope from Kwangya" | |
| 41 | DJ Hyo | DJ set (Note: To promote SM's sub-label ScreaM Records new live show SHOWME on Beyond Live.) | |
| 42 | Raiden (featuring Xiaojun) | DJ set | |
| 43 | J.E.B | DJ set | |
| 44 | Ginjo | DJ set | |
| 45 | Minimonster | DJ set | |
| 46 | Imlay | DJ set | |
| 47 | Mar Vista | DJ set | |
| 48 | Hitchhiker | DJ set | |

== Broadcast ==
| Country | Network/Platform | Ref. |
|---|---|---|
| Worldwide | Beyond Live; YouTube; TikTok; Twitch; Twitter; Facebook; Instagram; U+ Idol Live | |
| Indonesia | RCTI+; Vision+; Vidio; InsertLive; Trans TV | |
| Japan | KNTV | |
| Thailand | TrueID TV | |
| Vietnam | VieON; FPT Play; Zing MP3; POPS | |
