= Synk: Aexis Line (single album) =

Single album by Aespa
- Released: November 17, 2025
- Genre: K-pop
- Length: 13:58
- Languages: Korean; English
- Labels: SM; Kakao

Aespa chronology
Rich Man (2025)	Synk: Aexis Line (2025)	Lemonade (2026)

Synk: Aexis Line (Note: Also titled Synk: Aexis Line - 2025 Special Digital Single) is the second special digital single album and third overall by South Korean girl group Aespa. It was released by SM Entertainment on November 17, 2025, and contains four tracks that were previously performed on their Synk: Aexis Line tour.

== Background and release ==
On June 10, 2025, Aespa officially announced their third world tour, Synk: Aexis Line, via X and Weverse, with the first stop scheduled in Seoul from August 29 to August 30, 2025.

During their first stop in Seoul, the members unveiled solo performances featuring new, unreleased tracks, with each member participating in writing their own song. On November 13, 2025, SM Entertainment announced that Aespa would release the solo songs performed during the tour on digital platforms on November 17, coinciding with their fifth anniversary. Another version of the single album, containing the two sub-unit songs performed by Aespa beginning with the Tokyo shows of Synk: Aexis line, was released on August 9, 2026.

== Composition ==
Synk: Aexis Line contains four tracks. The first track, "Blue", performed by Winter, is described as a pop-rock song distinguished by its gradually intensifying guitar sound. The lyrics express a determined resolve to keep moving forward despite feelings of helplessness, and complement her signature delicate vocal tone. The second track, "Ketchup and Lemonade", which is performed by Ningning, is described as an R&B track that pairs a subdued, languid sound with Ningning's emotive vocals. The lyrics portray the delicate inner conflict of wanting to forget a breakup yet being unable to let go.

The third track, "Tornado", performed by Giselle, is described as a tropical dance track that delivers a refreshing yet dreamy atmosphere. Its lyrics candidly express the emotional duality of wanting to stir both her own heart and the other person's "like a tornado." The last track, "Good Stuff", performed by Karina, is described as a hip-hop dance track characterized by its heavy sound and addictive hook. The lyrics project a confident and bold attitude, delivering an intense and empowering energy.

== Track listing ==
Synk: Aexis Line track listing
No.	Title	Lyrics	Music	Arrangement	Length
1.	"Blue" (Sung by Winter)	Jimmy Jansson; Joowon; Winter; Kristin Carpenter; Hilda Stenmalm	Jimmy Jansson; Kristin Carpenter; Hilda Stenmalm	Jimmy Jansson	3:31
2.	"Ketchup and Lemonade" (Sung by Ningning)	Pink Slip; Amelia Moore; Inverness; Mary Wietz; Ningning; Aidan Rodriguez	Pink Slip; Amelia Moore; Inverness; Mary Wietz; Aidan Rodriguez	Pink Slip; Inverness; Aidan Rodriguez	4:08
3.	"Tornado" (Sung by Giselle)	Shintaro Yasuda; Giselle	Shintaro Yasuda; Giselle	Shintaro Yasuda	3:24
4.	"Good Stuff" (Sung by Karina)	Karina; Violet Skies; Ruth-Anne Cunningham	Violet Skies; Imlay; Jacob Manson; Ruth-Anne Cunningham	Imlay; Jacob Manson	2:55
Total length:					13:58

== Credits and personnel ==
Credits adapted from the single's liner notes, provided from Melon.

Studio

- SM Wavelet Studio – recording (track 1, 3)
- SM Droplet Studio – recording, digital editing (track 1), engineered for mix (track 1, 3)
- Doobdoob Studio – recording (track 1), digital editing (track 2)
- SM Yellow Tail Studio – recording (track 2)
- SM Aube Studio – recording, engineered for mix (track 2, 4), digital editing (track 4)
- Vibe Music Studio 606 – recording (track 2, 4)
- SM Blue Ocean Studio – mixing (track 1)
- SM Starlight Studio – mixing (track 2)
- SM Big Shot Studio – mixing (track 3)
- SM Blue Cup Studio – mixing (track 4)
- Klang Studio – mixing in Dolby Atmos (all tracks)
- Sterling Sound – mastering (all tracks)

Personnel

- SM Entertainment – executive producer
- Aespa
  - Karina – vocals, lyrics, background vocals (track 4)
  - Giselle – vocals, lyrics, composition, background vocals (track 3)
  - Winter – vocals, lyrics, background vocals (track 1)
  - Ningning – vocals, lyrics, background vocals (track 2)
- Jimmy Jansson – producer, lyrics, composition, arrangement, electric guitar, acoustic guitar, keyboard, synthesizer, drum programming (track 1)
- Joowon – lyrics, vocal directing (track 1)
- Kristin Carpenter – lyrics, composition, background vocals (track 1)
- Hilda Stenmalm – lyrics, composition, background vocals (track 1)
- Pink Slip – producer, lyrics, composition, arrangement (track 2)
- Amelia Moore – lyrics, composition (track 2)
- Inverness – producer, lyrics, composition, arrangement (track 2)
- Mary Wietz – lyrics, composition (track 2)
- Aidan Rodriguez – producer, lyrics, composition, arrangement (track 2)
- Shintaro Yasuda – producer, lyrics, composition, arrangement, vocal directing, background vocals, digital editing (track 3)
- Violet Skies – lyrics, composition (track 4)
- Ruth-Anne Cunningham – lyrics, composition (track 4)
- Imlay – producer, composition, arrangement, synthesizer, sound effects (track 4)
- Jacob Manson – producer, composition, arrangement, drums, bass, keyboard (track 4)
- Emily Yeonseo Kim – vocal directing (track 2), background vocals (track 1)
- Saay – vocal directing (track 4)
- Kim Seung-ho – drums (track 1)
- Koo Bon-am – bass (track 1)
- Kwon Han-eol – electric guitar (track 1)
- Lee Hyun-young – keyboard (track 1)
- Kang Eun-ji – recording (track 1, 3)
- Kim Joo-hyun – recording, digital editing (track 1), engineered for mix (track 1, 3)
- Eugene Kwon – recording (track 1)
- Noh Min-ji – recording (track 2)
- Kim Hyo-joon – recording, engineered for mix (track 2, 4), digital editing (track 4)
- Jeong Mo-yeon – recording (track 2)
- Lee Kang-hyun – recording (track 4)
- Jang Woo-young – digital editing (track 2)
- Kim Cheol-sun – mixing (track 1)
- Jeong Yoo-ra – mixing (track 2)
- Lee Min-kyu – mixing (track 3)
- Jung Eui-seok – mixing (track 4)
- Koo Jong-pil – mixing in Dolby Atmos (all tracks)
- P.O.D. – mixing assistant in Dolby Atmos (all tracks)
- Chris Gehringer – mastering (all tracks)

== Release history ==
Release history for Synk: Aexis Line
Region	Date	Format	Label
Various	November 17, 2025	SM; Kakao	Digital download; streaming
