= Synk: Parallel Line (single album) =

Single album by Aespa
- Released: October 9, 2024
- Genre: K-pop
- Length: 12:12
- Languages: Korean; English
- Labels: SM; Kakao

Aespa chronology
Armageddon (2024)	Synk: Parallel Line (2024)	Whiplash (2024)

Synk: Parallel Line (Note: Also titled Synk: Parallel Line - Special Digital Single) is a special digital single album by South Korean girl group Aespa. It was released by SM Entertainment on October 9, 2024, and contains four tracks that were previously performed on their Synk: Parallel Line tour.

== Background and release ==
On February 19, 2024, Aespa officially announced their second world tour, Synk: Parallel Line, via X and Weverse, with the first stop scheduled in Seoul on June 29 and 30, 2024.

During their first stop in Seoul, the members unveiled solo performances featuring new, unreleased tracks. Each member participated in writing their solo songs. The performances later went viral across social media. On October 7, 2024, SM Entertainment announced that Aespa would release the solo songs they performed during their tour on digital platforms.

== Composition ==
Synk: Parallel Line contains four tracks. The first track, "Up", performed by Karina, was described as a hip-hop dance track with a catchy chorus and minimalist beat. Written solely by Karina, the lyrics project confidence and pride, aiming to captivate listeners. The second track, "Dopamine", which performed by Giselle, was described as an R&B song that contains the complex and vague emotions of pretending not to be in love in order to hide one's true feelings for the other person. Giselle also participated in writing and composing the song.

The third track, "Bored!", performed by Ningning, was described as an R&B dance song featuring a unique top line and rhythmic track. The lyrics, in which Ningning participated in writing, contain the dual emotions of love that starts off strong and intense but ends up becoming boring. The last track, "Spark", performed by Winter, was described as a captivating song featuring a cool EDM sound that evokes a dreamy yet hazy atmosphere. The lyrics metaphorically express the feelings of falling in love through the imagery of a small spark. She also participated in writing and composing the song.

== Track listing ==
Synk: Parallel Line track listing
No.	Title	Lyrics	Music	Arrangement	Length
1.	"Up" (Sung by Karina)	Karina	Slow Rabbit; Morgan Connie Smith; Taneisha Jackson; Sofia Quinn; Pxpillon; Emma-Lee Andersson; BB Elliot; Stella Jones	Slow Rabbit; Pxpillon	2:47
2.	"Dopamine" (Sung by Giselle)	Giselle; Paulina "Pau" Cerrilla; Paige Garabito	Giselle; Paulina "Pau" Cerrilla; Paige Garabito; Shintaro Yasuda	Shintaro Yasuda	3:14
3.	"Bored!" (Sung by Ningning)	Ningning; Hilda Stenmalm; Bård Bonsaksen	Hilda Stenmalm; Bård Bonsaksen; Dom Rivinius; TMM	Dom Rivinius	2:51
4.	"Spark" (Sung by Winter)	Winter; Frankie Day (The Hub)	Winter; R.Tee; Vack; NoYeah	R.Tee; Vack; NoYeah	3:21
Total length:					12:12

== Charts ==
Weekly chart performance for Synk: Parallel Line
Chart (2024)	Peak position
Japan Combined Singles (Oricon)	20

== Release history ==
Release history for Synk: Parallel Line
Region	Date	Format	Label
Various	October 9, 2024	SM; Kakao	Digital download; streaming
