= 2021 Winter SM Town: SMCU Express =

Album by SM Town

- Digital cover

Studio album by SM Town
- Released: December 27, 2021
- Genre: K-pop
- Length: 38:18
- Language: Korean
- Labels: SM; Dreamus

SM Town chronology
SM Best Album 3 (2012)	2021 Winter SM Town: SMCU Express (2021)	2022 Winter SM Town: SMCU Palace (2022)

Singles from 2021 Winter SM Town: SMCU Express
- 1. "The Promise of H.O.T. (Jazz Version)" Released: November 26, 2021; 2. "Dreams Come True" Released: December 20, 2021; 3. "Hope from Kwangya" Released: December 27, 2021

2021 Winter SM Town: SMCU Express (stylized as 2021 Winter SMTOWN : SMCU EXPRESS) is the ninth winter album by SM Town. The studio album was released by SM Entertainment on December 27, 2021, and is available in 13 different versions. It features 10 songs, including two singles off the album, "Dreams Come True" and "Hope from Kwangya". The album marks the first SM Town's special season album release in 10 years after the predecessor 2011 Winter SMTOWN: The Warmest Gift, which was released in December 2011. It is also the first album to feature Kai, Red Velvet, NCT, and Aespa.

== Background and release ==
The concept of the album is based on SM Entertainment's own fictional universe called "SM Culture Universe" (SMCU), which was first introduced in 2020 by the company's founder Lee Soo-man through the debut of girl group Aespa.

Participating artists in the album include Kangta, BoA, TVXQ!, Super Junior (except Heechul among the actively-promoting members), Girls' Generation-Oh!GG, Shinee (except Taemin), Kai of Exo, Red Velvet, NCT (except Lucas), and Aespa. Also participating in the album's photoshoot were the Scream Records DJs Ginjo (formerly of Traxx), Raiden, and Imlay.

Through the SM Town 2022: SMCU Express project, 2021 Winter SM Town: SMCU Express was announced along as the first SM Town winter record by SM Entertainment in 10 years since 2011. According to SM, the album will feature various artists under the label and an "interesting combination of artists" aside from the track of existing groups. Prior to the album release, the jazz version of "The Promise of H.O.T." was pre-released on November 26, 2021, through SM Station and was added to the track listing on December 24. "Dreams Come True", which was also pre-released at SM Station on December 20, became the album's lead single. The pre-order period for the album started from December 10 and was scheduled for release on December 27.

== Composition ==
The lead single, "Dreams Come True", was described as a pop dance song remade by Aespa from S.E.S.'s second album Sea & Eugene & Shoo released in 1998. It combines the group's "spiritual energy and hip hop vibe" with the "mysterious and dreamy sound" with BoA participating in the song's production. The second single, "Hope from Kwangya", was described as a song with a "rich" sound of a "beautiful" string melody. It is a remake of SM Town's "representative" song, originally released from H.O.T.'s third album Resurrection in 1998. Kangta, who wrote and composed the original music, directed the vocals.

"Zoo", sung by NCT's Taeyong, Jeno, Hendery, and Yangyang and Aespa's Giselle, was described as a hip hop song with "unique" synths and "fast" tempo beats. "Melody", sung by Girls' Generation-Oh!GG, was described as a medium tempo pop song with a retro jazz atmosphere. The lyrics remind "beautiful and ecstatic" moments, creating a warm atmosphere in the cold winter with a retro jazz atmosphere created by various acoustic instruments. "Magical", sung by TVXQ and Super Junior, was described as a "cheerful" pop song with the lyrics, "Our friendship is destiny [and] miracle". "Snow Dream 2021", sung by Red Velvet's Yeri, NCT's Haechan, Chenle, and Jisung, and Aespa's Ningning, was described as a song that is "enough to feel the joy and happiness you have been waiting for in winter". It is a remake of the lead single from SM Town's winter album, Snow Dream, released in 2006. "Ordinary Day", sung by Super Junior's Kyuhyun, Shinee's Onew, and NCT's Taeil is about a "deep love" for lovers, friends, and family, who are always by one's side in the season when one realizes that every day is "special and precious". "Goodbye", sung by Girls' Generation's Sunny and NCT's Jungwoo and Renjun, was described as a medium R&B pop song with winter bell sounds, added acoustic bass, and jazzy keyboard sounds. "Dinner", sung by TVXQ, was described as a "warm" pop ballad about the moment of preparing dinner and sharing small happiness for a precious person at the end of a hard day. The song features a "dramatic" arrangement of "colorful" string melodies over an "emotional" piano performance. The jazz version of "The Promise of H.O.T." was performed by the SM Classics Town Orchestra with Yohan Kim and Hogyu 'Stiger' Hwang and drummer Shin Dong-jin. It was reinterpreted in the form of a jazz trio featuring "groovy" piano, bass, and "rhythmical" drum sounds.

== Promotion ==
The album was promoted through SM Town's second online concert SM Town Live 2022: SMCU Express at Kwangya on January 1, 2022, where "Dreams Come True", "Ordinary Day", "Zoo", and "Hope from Kwangya" were performed.

== Commercial performance ==
On January 4, 2022, it was reported that the album had sold 416,000 copies, becoming the highest selling SM Town album.

== Accolades ==
Awards and nominations for 2021 Winter SM Town: SMCU Express
Organization	Year	Category	Result	Ref.
Golden Disc Awards	2023	Album Bonsang	Nominated	

== Track listing ==
2021 Winter SM Town: SMCU Express track listing
No.	Title	Lyrics	Music	Arrangement	Length
1.	"Dreams Come True" (sung by Aespa)	Bada; Yoo Young-jin; BoA	Risto Armas Asikainen; Yoo Young-jin; BoA	Yoo Young-jin; BoA; Shaun Kim; BXN	3:24
2.	"Zoo" (sung by Taeyong, Jeno, Hendery, Yangyang, and Giselle)	Rick Bridges (X&); Taeyong; Jeno; Giselle	Keelah Jacobsen; Cameron Joseph Rugg; Ryan Jhun	Keelah Jacobsen; Ryan Jhun	2:57
3.	"Melody" (sung by Girls' Generation-Oh!GG)	Jo Yoon-kyung	Ronny Svendsen; JinByJin; Noday; Cazzi Opeia	Ronny Svendsen; JinByJin	3:15
4.	"Magical" (sung by TVXQ and Super Junior)	Lee Seu-ran	William James 'Bleu' McAuley III; Mats Valentin; Tobias Norberg	William James 'Bleu' McAuley III; Mats Valentin; Tobias Norberg	3:06
5.	"Snow Dream 2021" (sung by Yeri, Haechan, Chenle, Jisung, and Ningning)	Yoon Hyo-sang	Svein Finneide; Aslak Johnsen; Ken Ingwersen; Jon-Willy Rydningen; Eirik-Andre Rydningen	Hwang Seong-je (ButterFly); Seo Mi-rae (ButterFly); Kim Gyu-won (ButterFly)	3:36
6.	"Ordinary Day" (sung by Kyuhyun, Onew, and Taeil)	Kenzie	Kenzie	Kenzie	4:00
7.	"Goodbye" (12월의 인사; 12worui insa; 'Greetings for December', sung by Sunny, Jungwoo, and Renjun)	danke (lalala Studio)	MinGtion; Kim Yeon-seo; Dvwn	MinGtion	3:26
8.	"Dinner" (sung by TVXQ)	Oh Hyun-sun (lalala Studio)	Jeon Sun-hwan; Jerome 'Jigg' Andrews; Shelton Jones; Saire Jones	MinGtion; Jeon Sun-hwan; Jerome 'Jigg' Andrews	4:21
9.	"The Promise of H.O.T. (Jazz Version)" (우리들의 맹세; Urideurui maengse; 'Our Promise', performed by SM Classics Town Orchestra)		Yoo Young-jin	Yohan Kim; Hwang Ho-gyu (Hogyu 'Stiger' Hwang)	4:35
10.	"Hope from Kwangya" (빛; Bit; 'Light', sung by SM Town)	Kangta	Kangta	Kenzie	5:33
Total length:					38:18

=== Notes ===
- "Zoo" and "Dinner" are stylized in all caps.
- "Hope from Kwangya" is stylized as "Hope from KWANGYA".

== Credits and personnel ==
Credits adapted from the liner notes of the album.

Musicians

- Aespa – vocals (track 1), background vocals (track 1)
- Taeyong – vocals (track 2), background vocals (track 2), Korean lyrics (track 2)
- Jeno – vocals (track 2), background vocals (track 2), Korean lyrics (track 2)
- Hendery – vocals (track 2), background vocals (track 2)
- Yangyang – vocals (track 2), background vocals (track 2)
- Giselle – vocals (track 2), background vocals (track 2), Korean lyrics (track 2)
- Girls' Generation-Oh!GG – vocals (track 3), background vocals (track 3)
- TVXQ – vocals (tracks 4, 8), background vocals (track 8)
- Super Junior – vocals (track 4)
- Yeri – vocals (track 5)
- Haechan – vocals (track 5)
- Chenle – vocals (track 5)
- Jisung – vocals (track 5)
- Ningning – vocals (track 5)
- Kyuhyun – vocals (track 6), background vocals (track 6)
- Onew – vocals (track 6), background vocals (track 6)
- Taeil – vocals (track 6), background vocals (track 6)
- Sunny – vocals (track 7), background vocals (track 7)
- Jungwoo – vocals (track 7), background vocals (track 7)
- Renjun – vocals (track 7), background vocals (track 7)
- SM Town – vocals (track 10)
- Bada – Korean lyrics (track 1)
- Yoo Young-jin – Korean lyrics (track 1), composition (tracks 1, 9), arrangement (track 1), background vocals (track 1)
- BoA – Korean lyrics (track 1), composition (track 1), arrangement (track 1)
- Rick Bridges(X&) – Korean lyrics (track 2)
- Jo Yoon-kyung – Korean lyrics (track 3)
- Lee Seu-ran – Korean lyrics (track 4)
- Yoon Hyo-sang – Korean lyrics (track 5)
- Kenzie – Korean lyrics (track 6), composition (track 6), arrangement (tracks 6, 10)
- danke (lalala studio) – lyrics (track 7)
- Oh Hyun-sun (lalala studio) – Korean lyrics (track 8)
- Kangta – lyrics (track 10), composition (track 10)
- Risto Armas Asikainen – composition (track 1)
- Keelah Jacobsen – composition (track 2), arrangement (track 2)
- Cameron Joseph Rugg – composition (track 2)
- Ryan Jhun – composition (track 2), arrangement (track 2)
- Ronny Svendsen – composition (track 3), arrangement (track 3)
- JinByJin – composition (track 3), arrangement (track 3)
- Noday – composition (track 3)
- Cazzi Opeia – composition (track 3)
- William James 'Bleu' McAuley III – composition (track 4), arrangement (track 4), keyboard (track 4)
- Mats Valentin – composition (track 4), arrangement (track 4), drums & guitar (track 4), keyboard (track 4)
- Tobias Norberg – composition (track 4), arrangement (track 4)
- Svein Finneide – composition (track 5)
- Aslak Johnsen – composition (track 5)
- Ken Ingwersen – composition (track 5)
- Jon-Willy Rydningen – composition (track 5)
- Eirik-Andre Rydningen – composition (track 5)
- MinGtion – composition (track 7), arrangement (tracks 7–8), bass (track 8), piano (track 8)
- Kim Yeon-seo – composition (track 7), background vocals (track 10)
- Dvwn – composition (track 7)
- Jeon Sang-hwan – composition (track 8), arrangement (track 8)
- Jerome 'Jigg' Andrews – composition (track 8), arrangement (track 8)
- Shelton Jones – composition (track 8)
- Saire Jones – composition (track 8)
- Shaun Kim – arrangement (track 1)
- BXN – arrangement (track 1)
- Seo Mi-rae (ButterFly) – arrangement (track 5), background vocals (track 5)
- Kim Gyu-won – arrangement (track 5), rap making (track 5)
- Yohan Kim – arrangement (track 9), piano (track 9)
- Hwang Ho-gyu (Hogyu 'Stiger' Hwang) – arrangement (track 9), electric bass guitar & contrabass (track 9)
- Hwang Seong-je (ButterFly) – background vocals (tracks 4–5), arrangement (track 5), piano (track 5)
- Oiaisle – background vocals (track 8)
- Junny – background vocals (track 10)
- Bang In-jae – guitar (track 5)
- Park Shin-won – guitar (tracks 7–8)
- Hong Jun-ho – guitar (track 10)
- Song Young-joo – keyboard (track 6)
- Nile Lee – strings arrangement and conducting (tracks 6, 10), strings arrangement (track 9)
- Han Seong-eun – strings arrangement and conducting (track 8)
- On The String – strings (tracks 6, 10)
- Yung String – strings (track 8)
- SM Classics Town Orchestra – strings (track 9)
- Shin Dong-jin – drums (track 9)
- Choi Hoon – bass (track 10)

Technical

- Yoo Young-jin – directing (track 1), recording (track 1), digital editing (track 1), mixing (track 1)
- Rick Bridges(X&) – vocal directing (track 2)
- Lee Joo-hyung – vocal directing (track 3), Pro Tools operation (track 3)
- Hwang Seong-je (ButterFly) – vocal directing (track 4), Pro Tools operation (track 4), all programming (track 5)
- Kenzie – directing (track 6)
- MinGtion – directing (track 7)
- Moon Jung-jae – recording direction (track 9)
- Kangta – directing (track 10)
- Jung Yoo-ra – recording (tracks 2–3, 10), digital editing (tracks 2–3, 10), mixing engineer (track 3)
- Lee Min-gyu – recording (track 3), mixing (track 3)
- Lee Ji-hong – recording (tracks 3–4), mixing engineer (track 4), mixing (track 4)
- Kang Eun-ji – recording (tracks 5, 8), digital editing (tracks 5, 8)
- No Min-ji – recording (tracks 6–7), digital editing (tracks 6–7)
- Jeong Ki-hong – recording (tracks 6, 8–10)
- Choi Da-in – recording (tracks 6, 8–10)
- Lee Chan-mi – recording (tracks 6, 9–10)
- Seo Mi-rae (ButterFly) – digital editing (tracks 4–5), vocal directing (track 5), Pro Tools operation (track 5)
- Jang Woo-young – digital editing (track 6)
- Kwon Yu-jin – digital editing (track 8)
- Jeong Eui-seok – mixing (tracks 2, 8)
- Namkoong Jin – mixing (tracks 5, 9–10)
- Kim Cheol-soon – mixing (tracks 6–7)
- Jeon Hoon – mastering
- Kwon Nam-woo – mastering
- Shin Soo-min – mastering assistant

== Charts ==
=== Weekly charts ===
Weekly charts performance for 2021 Winter SM Town: SMCU Express
Chart (2022)	Peak position
Croatian International Albums (HDU)	21
Japanese Albums (Oricon)	14
Japanese Hot Albums (Billboard Japan)	30
South Korean Albums (Gaon)	1

=== Monthly charts ===
Monthly chart performance for 2021 Winter SM Town: SMCU Express
Chart (2021)	Peak position
South Korean Albums (Gaon)	2

=== Year-end charts ===
Year-end chart performance for 2021 Winter SM Town: SMCU Express
Chart (2022)	Position
South Korean Albums (Circle)	29

=== Singles charts ===
Weekly chart performance of "Zoo"
Chart (2022)	Peak position
New Zealand Hot Singles (RMNZ)	38
Singapore (RIAS Regional)	15

== Certifications and sales ==
Winter SM Town: SMCU Express
Region	Certification	Certified units/sales
South Korea (KMCA)	2× Platinum	650,084

== Release history ==
Release history for 2021 Winter SM Town: SMCU Express
Region	Date	Format(s)	Label(s)	Ref.
Various	December 27, 2021	CD; digital download; streaming	SM; Dreamus	
