= Up (Aespa song) =

Song by Aespa

from the album Synk: Parallel Line
- Language: Korean; English
- Released: October 9, 2024
- Genre: Hip-hop; dance
- Length: 2:47
- Label: SM; Kakao
- Composers: Slow Rabbit; Morgan Connie Smith; Taneisha Jackson; Sofia Quinn; Pxpillon; Emma-Lee Andersson; BB Elliot; Stella Jones
- Lyricist: Karina

Audio video
- "Up" on YouTube

"Up" (stylized in all caps) is a song by South Korean singer and rapper Karina, and included on the digital single album Synk: Parallel Line by South Korean girl group Aespa. It was released through SM Entertainment on October 9, 2024. The song is a hip-hop and dance track, written and composed by multiple contributors, including Karina. It achieved widespread success, peaking at number 2 on South Korea's Circle Chart and placing on other global charts.

== Background and composition ==
On June 29–30, 2024, Aespa held their second concert tour Synk: Parallel Line at Jamsil Indoor Stadium. Each member of the group debuted a new solo song for the tour. Karina performed second with the hip-hop dance song "Up", which she had written all the lyrics for. The song includes an "addictive" chorus and is a "minimal" track containing a "confident" message. On October 9, the group released Synk: Parallel Line to streaming platforms, including the four solo songs performed.

== Commercial performance ==
"Up" debuted at number six on Circle Digital Chart and later peaked at number two. It also debuted and peaked at number one on the South Korea Songs chart. In Japan, "Up" entered the Japan Hot 100 at number 98, later peaking at number 50. It also peaked at number 35 on Oricon Streaming Chart. In Singapore, the song peaked at number 11 on the Top Streaming Chart and reached number four on the Top Regional Chart. It also debuted and peaked at number 11 on the Singapore Songs chart. The song also debuted and peaked at number 12 on the Malaysia Songs chart. It debuted at number nine on the Hong Kong Songs chart and number three on the Taiwan Songs chart. In New Zealand, the song debuted at number 17 on the Hot 40 Singles chart. Internationally, it entered and peaked the Billboard Global 200 at number 27, while debuting and peaking at number 12 on the Global Excl. US chart.

== Reception ==
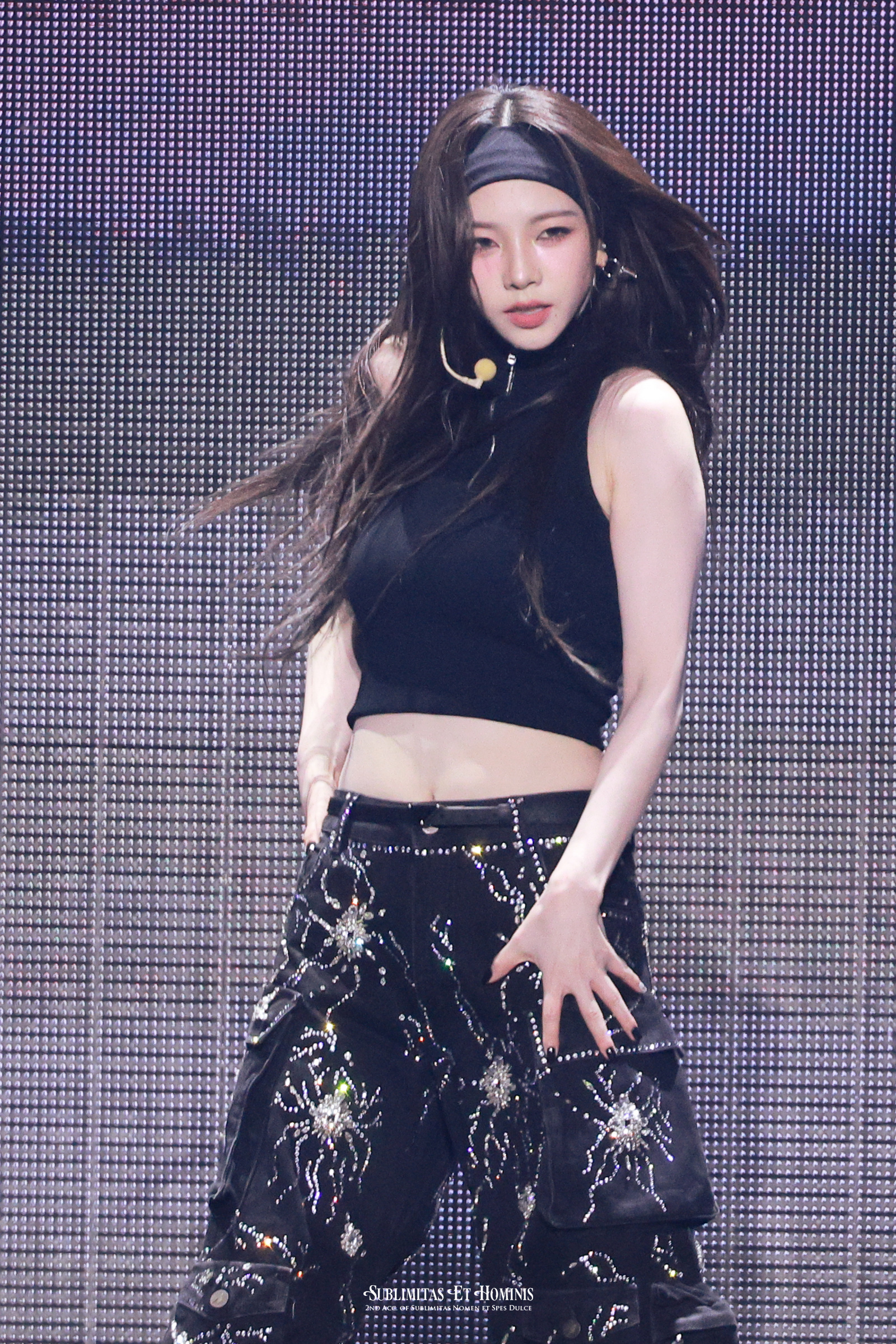
Karina performing "Up" at Synk: Parallel Line encore in Seoul

"Up" achieved viral success quickly after Karina first performed it at the Synk: Parallel Line concert tour, even before the song had an official release on streaming platforms, with dance covers and challenges posted on various short-form platforms. Due to the strong public response, SM Entertainment decided to release it officially, alongside the other solo songs performed at the concert. It was noted by Z Yeonwoo for X why Z that "Up" stood out because Karina contributed to songwriting herself, knowing what kind of songs work best for her and the style she's most comfortable in.

== Accolades ==
On South Korea music programs, the song received its first music program award in Show! Music Core, marking Karina's first award as a soloist despite not having officially debuted as one yet.

Awards and nominations for "Up"
Award ceremony	Year	Category	Result	Ref.
iHeartRadio Music Awards	2025	Favorite K-pop Dance Challenge	Nominated	
MAMA Awards	2025	Best Dance Performance – Female Solo	Nominated	
MAMA Awards	2025	Song of the Year	Nominated	

== Credits and personnel ==
Credits adapted from Melon.

- Karina – vocals, lyrics
- Slow Rabbit – composition, arrangement
- Morgan Connie Smith – composition
- Taneisha Jackson – composition
- Sofia Quinn – composition
- Pxpillon – composition, arrangement
- Emma-Lee Andersson – composition
- BB Elliot – composition
- Stella Jones – composition

== Charts ==
=== Weekly charts ===
Weekly chart performance for "Up"
Chart (2024)	Peak position
Global 200 (Billboard)	27
Hong Kong (Billboard)	9
Japan (Japan Hot 100)	50
Japan Streaming (Oricon)	35
Malaysia (Billboard)	12
New Zealand Hot Singles (RMNZ)	17
Singapore (RIAS)	11
South Korea (Circle)	2
Taiwan (Billboard)	3

=== Monthly charts ===
Monthly chart performance for "Up"
Chart (2024)	Position
South Korea (Circle)	3

=== Year-end charts ===
2024 year-end chart performance for "Up"
Chart (2024)	Position
South Korea (Circle)	66
Taiwan (Hito Radio)	29

2025 year-end chart performance for "Up"
Chart (2025)	Position
Japan Heatseekers Songs (Billboard Japan)	10
South Korea (Circle)	36

== Certifications ==
Certifications for "Up"
Region	Certification	Certified units/sales
Streaming
Japan (RIAJ)	Gold	50,000,000^{†}
^{†} Streaming-only figures based on certification alone.

== Release history ==
Release history for "Up"
Region	Date	Format	Label(s)	Ref.
Various	October 9, 2024	Digital download; streaming	SM; Kakao	

== See also ==
- List of Show! Music Core Chart winners (2024)
