= 2022 Winter SM Town: SMCU Palace =

Album by SM Town

- Digital cover

Studio album by SM Town
- Released: December 26, 2022
- Studios: 821 Sound (Seoul); Doobdoob (Seoul); Golden Bell Tree Sound (Seoul); Infinity Music (Seoul); Seoul; SM Blue Cup (Seoul); SM Blue Ocean (Seoul); SM LVYIN (Seoul); SM SSAM (Seoul); SM Starlight (Seoul); SM Yellow Tail (Seoul); Sound Pool (Seoul)
- Genres: K-pop; Christmas
- Length: 33:18
- Language: Korean
- Labels: SM; Dreamus
- Producer: Lee Soo-man

SM Town chronology
2021 Winter SM Town: SMCU Express (2021)	2022 Winter SM Town: SMCU Palace (2022)	2025 SM Town: The Culture, the Future (2025)

Singles from 2022 Winter SM Town: SMCU Palace
- 1. "Beautiful Christmas" Released: December 14, 2022; 2. "The Cure" Released: January 1, 2023

2022 Winter SM Town: SMCU Palace (stylized as 2022 Winter SMTOWN : SMCU PALACE) is the tenth winter album by SM Town. It was released by SM Entertainment on December 26, 2022. The album contains ten tracks that saw various collaborations of the label's artists, with two singles have been released to support the album; "Beautiful Christmas" was released as the album's lead single on December 14, 2022, and "The Cure", released as the second single on January 1, 2023, during the annual online free concert SM Town Live 2023: SMCU Palace at Kwangya.

== Background and release ==
The concept of the album is the continuation of its predecessor 2021 Winter SM Town: SMCU Express (2021), where the "SMCU Palace" is the place set in the imaginary land of the SM Culture Universe lore, Kwangya. Described by SM Entertainment as the combination of artists' collaboration that would never be seen anywhere else, the album contains collaborations between artists in the label, and was released on December 26, 2022. The album led by its lead single "Beautiful Christmas", a collaboration of Red Velvet and Aespa, was released on December 14, 2022, twelve days prior the album release date. It was followed by "The Cure", a collaboration of Kangta, BoA, and all SM's group's leader, released as the second single.

A total of 58 artists from the label participated in the album, including Kangta, BoA, TVXQ!, Super Junior (except Heechul among the actively-promoting members), Taeyeon and Hyoyeon from Girls' Generation, Shinee (except Taemin), Exo (except Lay, Baekhyun, and D.O.), Red Velvet, NCT (except Lucas), Aespa, and the Scream Records DJs: Ginjo (formerly of Traxx), Raiden, Imlay, and Mar Vista.

== Composition ==
The lead single, "Beautiful Christmas", which is the collaboration of the label's girl groups Red Velvet and Aespa, was described as a carol dance track with a lively swing rhythm centered on rhythmic bass and piano performances, conveying the song's message that today is the best moment with a loved one, doubling the exciting party atmosphere. The second single, "The Cure", was described as a pop song characterized by an exciting African rhythm and a choir full of scale.

== Track listing ==
2022 Winter SM Town: SMCU Palace track listing
No.	Title	Lyrics	Music	Arrangement	Length
1.	"Welcome to SMCU Palace" (performed by SM Classics Town Orchestra)		Park In-young		2:09
2.	"The Cure" (sung by Kangta, BoA, U-Know, Leeteuk, Taeyeon, Onew, Suho, Irene, Taeyong, Mark, Kun, and Karina)	Hwang Yu-bin; Taeyong; Mark	David Zandén; Eirik Røland; Jacob Alm; Pär Löfqvist	Olof Peter Markensten; Zandén; Alm; Joel Eriksson; Löfqvist	3:40
3.	"Hot & Cold" (온도차; Ondocha; 'Temperature Difference', sung by Kai, Seulgi, Jeno, and Karina)	Choi Ji-yoon (153/Joombas)	G'harah "PK" Degeddingseze; Carmen Reece; Andre Merrit; Steve Octave	PK; Reece	3:27
4.	"Beautiful Christmas" (sung by Red Velvet and Aespa)	Kim Jae-won	Justin Reinstein; Alysa (@Number K); JJean (@Number K)	Alysa (@Number K)	3:29
5.	"Jet" (sung by Eunhyuk, Hyo, Taeyong, Jaemin, Sungchan, Giselle and Winter)	Rick Bridges	Greg Bonnick; Hayden Chapman; Karin Wilhelmina Eurenius; Jeremy "Tay" Jasper	LDN Noise	3:27
6.	"Priority" (sung by Max Changmin, Taeyeon, and Winter)	Park So-hyun	Lewis Jankel; Kate Stewart; Ryan Ashley; Farrah Guenena	Shift K3Y	3:34
7.	"Time After Time" (원; Won; 'Circle', sung by BoA, Wendy, and Ningning)	Jeon Ji-eun (January 8th)	Anne Judith Wik; Ronny Svendsen; Nermin Harambašić; Sverre C. Sunde; Andreas Estenstad; Gabriel Brandes	Svendsen; Sunde	3:02
8.	"Where You Are" (넌 어디에; Neon eodie, sung by Ryeowook, Onew, Doyoung, Chenle, and Xiaojun)	MinGtion; Junny	MinGtion; Junny	MinGtion	4:26
9.	"Happier" (sung by Kangta, Yesung, Suho, Taeil, and Renjun)	Kim Anna (PNP)	Jake Torrey; Andrea Rosario; Alex Bilo; Johnny Simpson	Simpson; Bilo	2:42
10.	"Good to Be Alive" (performed by Hyo, Key, Chen, Johnny, Ningning, Ginjo, Raiden, IMLAY, and Mar Vista)	Ga Young (PNP); Sam Carter (PNP)	Malia Civetz; Nick Bradley; Lawrent	Lawrent; Ginjo; Raiden; Imlay; Mar Vista	3:22
Total length:					33:18

== Credits and personnel ==
Credits adapted from the album's liner notes.

Studio

- SM Big Shot Studio – recording (track 2), digital editing (track 2, 4), engineered for mix (track 4), mixing (track 6)
- SM LVYIN Studio – recording (track 4–6, 10), digital editing (track 1, 5), engineered for mix (track 8), mixing (track 5)
- SM Starlight Studio – recording (track 2, 9), digital editing (track 2, 6), engineered for mix (track 3), mixing (track 3)
- SM Yellow Tail Studio – recording (track 7), engineered for mix (track 7, 9)
- SM SSAM Studio – recording (track 5–10), digital editing (track 10)
- Sound Pool Studio – recording (track 2–3, 9), digital editing (track 7, 9–10)
- doobdoob Studio – recording (track 2–3, 7–8), digital editing (track 3)
- Infinity Music – recording (track 1)
- Golden Bell Tree Sound – recording (track 4)
- Seoul Studio – recording (track 8)
- SM Blue Cup Studio – recording (track 7), mixing (track 8–9)
- SM Concert Hall Studio – mixing (track 1–2, 7)
- SM Blue Ocean Studio – mixing (track 4, 10)
- 821 Sound – recording (track 2), mastering (all tracks)

Personnel

- SM Entertainment – executive producer
- Lee Soo-man – producer
- Lee Sung-soo – production director, executive supervisor
- Tak Young-jun – executive supervisor
- Yoo Young-jin – music and sound supervisor
- Red Velvet – vocals (track 4), background vocals (track 4)
  - Irene – vocals (track 2, 4), background vocals (track 4)
  - Seulgi – vocals (track 3–4), background vocals (track 3–4)
  - Wendy – vocals (track 4, 7), background vocals (track 4, 7)
  - Joy – vocals (track 4), background vocals (track 4)
  - Yeri – vocals (track 4), background vocals (track 4)
- Aespa – vocals (track 4), background vocals (track 4)
  - Karina – vocals (track 3–4), background vocals (track 3–4)
  - Giselle – vocals (track 4–5), background vocals (track 4–5)
  - Winter – vocals (track 4–6), background vocals (track 4–6)
  - Ningning – vocals (track 4, 7, 10), background vocals (track 4, 7, 10)
- Kangta – vocals (track 2, 9), background vocals (track 9)
- BoA – vocals (track 2, 7), background vocals (track 7)
- U-Know – vocals (track 2)
- Taeyeon – vocals (track 2, 6), background vocals (track 6)
- Onew – vocals (track 2, 8)
- Suho – vocals (track 2, 9), background vocals (track 9)
- Taeyong – vocals (track 2, 5), lyrics (track 2), background vocals (track 5)
- Mark – vocals (track 2), lyrics (track 2)
- Kun – vocals (track 2)
- Kai – vocals (track 3), background vocals (track 3)
- Jeno – vocals (track 3), background vocals (track 3)
- Eunhyuk – vocals (track 5), background vocals (track 5)
- Hyoyeon – vocals (track 5, 10), background vocals (track 5, 10)
- Na Jae-min – vocals (track 5), background vocals (track 5)
- Sungchan – vocals (track 5), background vocals (track 5)
- Max Changmin – vocals (track 6), background vocals (track 6)
- Ryeowook – vocals (track 8)
- Doyoung – vocals (track 8)
- Chenle – vocals (track 8)
- Xiaojun – vocals (track 8)
- Yesung – vocals (track 9), background vocals (track 9)
- Taeil – vocals (track 9), background vocals (track 9)
- Renjun – vocals (track 9), background vocals (track 9)
- Key – vocals (track 10), background vocals (track 10)
- Chen – vocals (track 10), background vocals (track 10)
- Johnny – vocals (track 10), background vocals (track 10)
- Ginjo – performer (track 10), arrangement (track 10)
- Raiden – performer (track 10), arrangement (track 10)
- Imlay – performer (track 10), arrangement (track 10)
- Mar Vista – performer (track 10), arrangement (track 10)
- SM Classics Town Orchestra – performer (track 1)
- Park In-young – composition, orchestration, recording directing (track 1)
- Hwang Yu-bin – lyrics (track 2)
- Olof Peter Markensten – composition, arrangement, background vocals (track 2)
- David Zandén – composition, arrangement, background vocals (track 2)
- Eirik Røland – composition, arrangement, background vocals (track 2)
- Jacob Alm – composition, arrangement, background vocals (track 2)
- Joel Eriksson – composition, arrangement, background vocals (track 2)
- Pär Löfqvist – composition, arrangement, background vocals (track 2)
- Choi Ji-yoon (153/Joombas) – lyrics (track 3)
- G'harah "PK" Degeddingseze – composition, arrangement, background vocals (track 3)
- Carmen Reece – composition, arrangement, background vocals (track 3)
- Andre Merrit – composition, background vocals (track 3)
- Steve Octave – composition (track 3)
- Kim Jae-won – lyrics (track 4)
- Justin Reinstein – composition (track 4)
- Alysa (@NumberK) – composition, arrangement (track 4)
- JJean (@NumberK) – composition (track 4)
- Rick Bridges – lyrics (track 5)
- Greg Bonnick (LDN Noise) – composition, arrangement (track 5)
- Hayden Chapman (LDN Noise) – composition, arrangement (track 5)
- Karin Wilhelmina Eurenius – composition (track 5)
- Jeremy "Tay" Jasper – composition (track 5)
- Park So-hyun – lyrics (track 6)
- Lewis "Shift K3Y" Jankel – composition, arrangement (track 6)
- Kate Stewart – composition, arrangement (track 6)
- Ryan Ashley – composition, arrangement (track 6)
- Farrah Guenena – composition, arrangement (track 6)
- Jeon Ji-eun (January 8th) – lyrics (track 7)
- Anne Judith Wik – composition (track 7)
- Ronny Svendsen – composition, arrangement (track 7)
- Nermin Harambašić – composition (track 7)
- Sverre C. Sunde – composition, arrangement (track 7)
- Andreas Estenstad – composition (track 7)
- Gabriel Brandes – composition (track 7)
- MinGtion – lyrics, composition, arrangement, vocal directing, digital editing (track 8)
- Junny – lyrics, composition (track 8)
- Kim Anna (PNP) – lyrics (track 9)
- Jake Torrey – composition (track 9)
- Andrea Rosario – composition (track 9)
- Alex Bilo – composition, arrangement (track 9)
- Johnny Simpson – composition, arrangement (track 9)
- Ga Young (PNP) – lyrics (track 10)
- Sam Carter (PNP) – lyrics (track 10)
- Malia Civetz – composition, background vocals (track 10)
- Nick Bradley – composition, background vocals (track 10)
- Lawrent – composition, arrangement, background vocals (track 10)
- Emily Kim Yeon-seo – vocal directing (track 2–4, 7), background vocals (track 2, 7)
- Kang Tae-woo a.k.a. Soulman – background vocals (track 2)
- 1Take – vocal directing (track 5)
- Lee Joo-hyung – vocal directing, Pro Tools operating (track 6)
- Ju Chan-yang (Pollen) – vocal directing (track 9)
- Kriz – vocal directing, background vocals (track 10)
- Moon Jung-jae – recording directing, piano (track 1)
- Lee Jong-han – instrumentation (track 1)
- Han Seong-eun – strings conducting, strings arrangement (track 8)
- Yung – strings (track 8)
- Lee Min-kyu – recording (track 2), digital editing (track 2, 4), engineered for mix (track 4), mixing (track 6)
- Lee Ji-hong – recording (track 4–6, 10), digital editing (track 1, 5), engineered for mix (track 8), mixing (track 5)
- Jeong Yoo-ra – recording (track 2, 9), digital editing (track 2, 6), engineered for mix (track 3), mixing (track 3)
- Noh Min-ji – recording (track 7), engineered for mix (track 7, 9)
- Kang Eun-ji – recording (track 5–10), digital editing (track 10)
- Jeong Ho-jin – recording (track 2–3, 9)
- Woo Min-jeong – recording (track 2), digital editing (track 7, 9–10)
- Eugene Kwon – recording (track 2–3, 7–8), digital editing (track 3)
- Kim Yong-sub – recording (track 1)
- Shin Dae-yong – recording (track 1)
- Kim Min-hee – recording (track 2)
- Kim Kwang-min – recording (track 4)
- Jeong Ki-hong – recording (track 8)
- Lee Chan-mi – recording assistant (track 8)
- Jung Eui-seok – recording (track 7), mixing (track 8–9)
- Nam Koong-jin – mixing (track 1–2, 7)
- Kim Cheol-sun – mixing (track 4, 10)
- Kwon Nam-woo – mastering (all tracks)

== Charts ==
=== Weekly charts ===
Weekly chart performance for 2022 Winter SM Town: SMCU Palace
Chart (2022–2023)	Peak position
Japanese Albums (Oricon)	25
Japanese Digital Albums (Oricon)	18
Japanese Hot Albums (Billboard Japan)	46
South Korean Albums (Circle)	4

=== Monthly charts ===
Monthly chart performance for 2022 Winter SM Town: SMCU Palace
Chart (2022)	Peak position
South Korean Albums (Circle)	7

=== Year-end chart ===
Year-end chart performance for 2022 Winter SM Town: SMCU Palace
Chart (2022)	Peak position
South Korea Albums (Circle)	89

== Certifications and sales ==
Region	Certification	Certified units/sales
South Korea (KMCA)	Platinum	553,966

== Release history ==
Release history for 2022 Winter SM Town: SMCU Palace
Region	Date	Format(s)	Label(s)	Ref.
Various	December 26, 2022	CD; digital download; streaming	SM; Dreamus	
