= Musinsa =

South Korean fashion and lifestyle company

Musinsa Co., Ltd. 주식회사 무신사
- Type: Private
- Industry: Fashion, E-commerce
- Founded: February 2001; 25 years ago
- Founder: Cho Man-ho
- Headquarters: Seoul, South Korea, South Korea
- Area served: Worldwide
- Key people: Cho Man-ho (Founder and business representative)
- Products: Clothing; Footwear; accessories
- Number of employees: 1,000+
- Subsidiaries: 29CM, StyleShare
- Website: musinsa.com

Musinsa Co., Ltd. (Korean: 주식회사 무신사) is a South Korean e-commerce company and clothing brand focused on casual wear and streetwear. It operates one of the largest online fashion platforms in South Korea and produces its own private-label brand, Musinsa Standard.

== History ==
Musinsa was founded in February 2001 by Cho Man-ho (then a high-school student) as an online community on the portal Freechal for sneaker enthusiasts. The community was originally named "무진장 신발 사진이 많은 곳" (Mujinjang sinbal sajin-i maneun got), which translates as "a place with a massive amount of sneaker photos." The name "Musinsa" is an acronym taken from this phrase.

In 2003, after Freechal introduced paid-community policies, Cho launched the independent website musinsa.com. The site expanded beyond sneakers into broader street-fashion content, including street photography and the launch of Musinsa Magazine in 2005.

In 2009 the company opened Musinsa Store, an online marketplace selling authentic and exclusive designer and streetwear brands. Musinsa was formally incorporated in 2012.

In 2017 it launched its private-label line Musinsa Standard, which offers affordable high-quality basic and modern casual wear and is frequently compared to Uniqlo. Offline flagship stores for the brand later opened, including a location in Gangnam.

In 2019 Musinsa reached unicorn status after securing investment led by Sequoia Capital at a valuation of USD 800 million; it became the first Korean fashion platform (and the 10th Korean company overall) to do so.

In 2021 Musinsa acquired 29CM and StyleShare to expand its customer base and product range.

The company launched the Musinsa Global Store in 2022, serving multiple international markets including the United States, Japan, Singapore and Australia, and has continued to expand both online and offline (with further plans for markets such as China).
