= Giselle (singer) =

Japanese singer and rapper (born 2000)

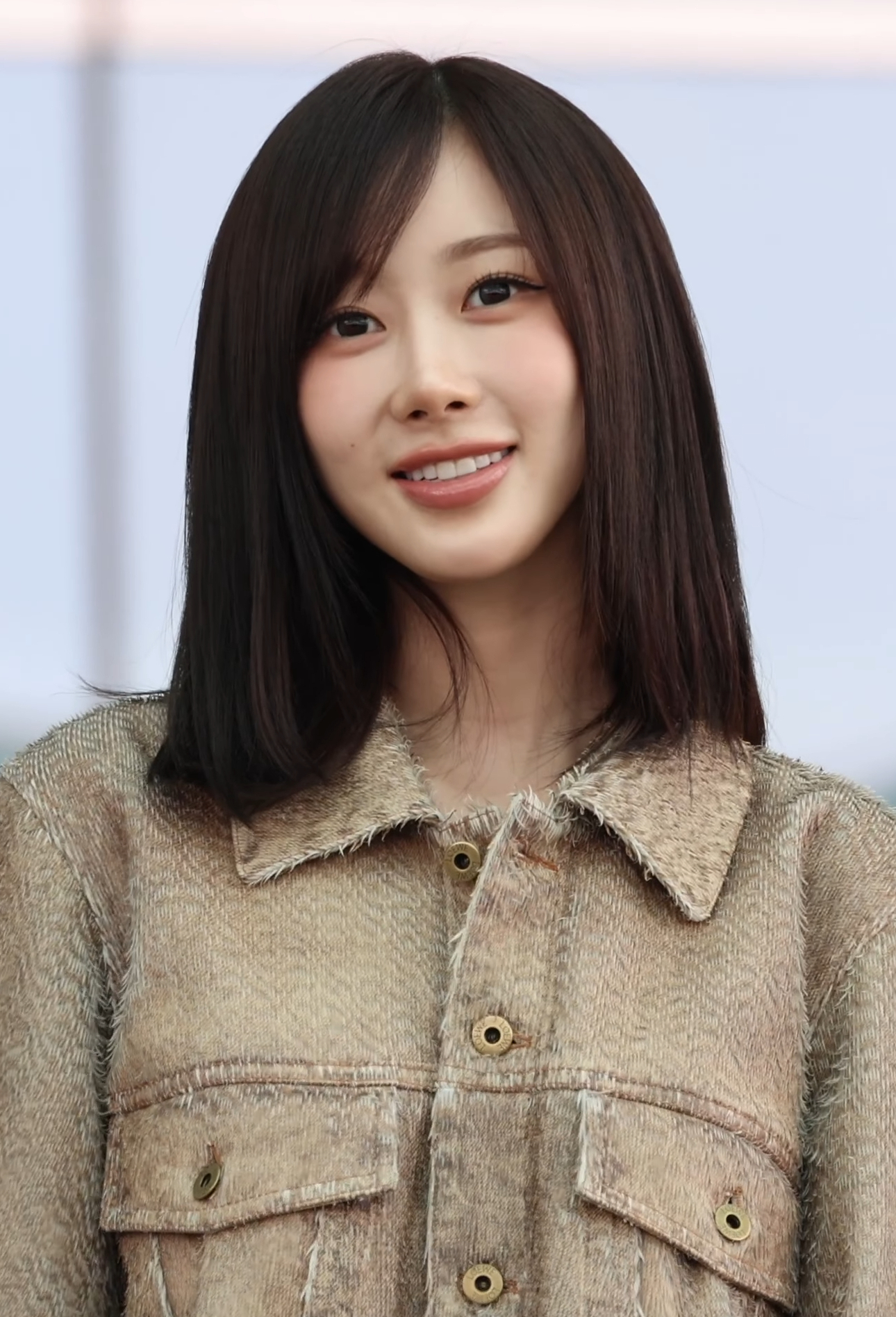
- Giselle in March 2026
- Born: Aeri Uchinaga; October 30, 2000 (age 26); Seoul, South Korea
- Other name: Kim Ae-ri
- Citizenship: Japan
- Occupations: Singer; rapper
- Musical career
- Genres: K-pop; hyperpop
- Instrument: Vocals
- Years active: 2020–present
- Labels: SM; Warner
- Member of: Aespa
- Website: Official website

Japanese name
- Kanji: 内永 枝利
- Hiragana: うちなが えり
- Romanization: Uchinaga Eri

Korean name
- Hangul: 김애리
- RR: Gim Aeri
- MR: Kim Aeri

Aeri Uchinaga (Japanese: 内永 枝利, Hepburn: Uchinaga Eri; born October 30, 2000), known professionally as Giselle (Korean: 지젤), is a Japanese singer and rapper based in South Korea. She is a member of the South Korean girl group Aespa, formed by SM Entertainment in November 2020.

== Early life ==
Giselle was born Aeri Uchinaga in Gangnam District, Seoul, South Korea, to a South Korean mother and a Japanese father, and grew up in Tokyo, Japan. She is fluent in English, Japanese, and Korean.

She attended Tokyo International School. For high school, Giselle attended International School of the Sacred Heart, where she was introduced to K-pop in her sophomore year of high school. In addition, she went to the same school as Rima from the girl group NiziU. She later returned to Korea after graduation to audition for SM Entertainment and passed the company's Saturday auditions after 4 attempts. She adopted the stage name Giselle after receiving it from a senior at the company who helped train her.

== Career ==
=== 2020–present: Debut in Aespa and solo activities ===
After 11 months of training, SM Entertainment unveiled Giselle as the third member of Aespa on November 6, 2020, which was the company's first girl group since Red Velvet in 2014. They debuted with the single "Black Mamba" on November 17.

In December, 2021, Giselle participated in the song "Zoo" with labelmates from SM for the 2021 Winter SM Town: SMCU Express.

On June 4, 2024, it was announced that Giselle will feature in BOL4's single "Lips" which was released on June 13. On November 14, it was announced that Giselle will feature in Haon's single "Skrr" which is set for release on the 20th.

== Artistry ==
Giselle cites Ariana Grande, Stevie Wonder, and Blink-182 among her primary musical influences. In an interview with Vogue Singapore, she said that "[her] voice was only suitable for R&B and soft ballads" and that she is currently "trying to adapt [her] voice to rock and rock ballads".

== Other ventures ==
=== Endorsements ===
On March 1, 2024, Giselle was appointed as the brand ambassador for the Spanish luxury fashion house Loewe. She made her first appearance as their ambassador during the brand's "Fall 2024 Ready-to-Wear Collection" in Paris. On September 9, Giselle was appointed as the muse of the cosmetics brand Either&, which is based in Seoul but has plans to soon expand in Japan.

On February 28, 2025, Giselle was selected as the global ambassador for SENKA, a Japanese skincare brand. Promotional content for "SENKA Perfect Whip" featuring Giselle was released in Japan, Korea, Thailand, Vietnam, and Singapore. On April 17, Maison Kitsuné collaborated with Eyes Magazine to release the SS25 collection pictorial with Giselle as their muse. On September 22, casual brand Wacky Willy has selected Giselle as its muse and has been featured in its 25FW campaign pictorial.

=== Philanthropy ===
In June 2022, Giselle donated KR₩ 10 million (US$ 7461.15) to Yuhengsa, which is a South Korean non-profit organisation that aims to protect and rehabilitate abandoned animals.

== Discography ==
=== Singles ===
==== As featured artist ====
List of singles as featured artist, showing year released, selected chart positions and album name
Title	Year	Peak chart positions	Album
Title	Year	KOR	Album
"Lips" (BOL4 featuring Giselle)	2024	102	Non-album singles
"Skrr" (Haon featuring Giselle)	2024	88	Non-album singles

=== Other charted songs ===
List of other charted songs, showing year released, selected chart positions, and name of the album
Title	Year	Peak chart positions			Album
Title	Year	KOR	NZ Hot	SGP	Album
"Zoo" (with Taeyong, Jeno, Hendery and Yangyang)	2021	— (Note: "Zoo" did not enter the Circle Digital Chart, but debuted and peaked at number 130 on the component Download Chart.)	38	— (Note: "Zoo" did not enter the RIAS Top Chart, but peaked at number 15 on the Regional Chart.)	2021 Winter SM Town: SMCU Express
"Jet" (with Eunhyuk, Hyo, Taeyong, Jaemin, Sungchan and Winter)	2022	— (Note: "Jet" did not enter the Circle Digital Chart, but debuted and peaked at number 108 on the component Download Chart.)	—	—	2022 Winter SM Town: SMCU Palace
"Dopamine" (Note: Credited under Aespa but is a solo track performed by Giselle.)	2024	162	—	—	Synk: Parallel Line
"Tornado"	2025	— (Note: "Tornado" did not enter Circle Digital Chart but peaked at number 28 on Circle Download Chart)	—	—	Synk: Aexis Line
"—" denotes releases that did not chart or were not released in that region.

=== Composition credits ===
All song credits are adapted from the Korea Music Copyright Association's database unless stated otherwise.

List of songs, showing year released, artist name, and name of the album
Title	Year	Artist	Album	Composer	Lyricist	Ref.
"Synk, Giselle"	2020	Herself	Non-album single	Yes	Yes	
"Zoo"	2021	Herself (with Taeyong, Jeno, Hendery and Yangyang)	2021 Winter SM Town: SMCU Express	No	Yes	
"2Hot4U" (Note: Unreleased song that was performed by Giselle at Synk: Hyper Line.)	2023	Herself	Non-album singles	Yes	Yes	
"Lips"	2024	BOL4 (featuring Herself)	Non-album singles	No	Yes	
"Dopamine"	2024	Herself	Synk: Parallel Line	Yes	Yes	
"Skrr"	2024	Haon (featuring Herself)	Non-album single	Yes	Yes	
"Tornado"	2025	Herself	Synk: Aexis Line	Yes	Yes	
"Lollipop"	2026	Herself and Ningning	Synk: Aexis Line 2026	Yes	Yes	
"ByeB4Hello"	2026	Herself	Synk: Compaexity	Yes	Yes	

== Filmography ==
=== Web shows ===
Year	Title	Role	Notes	Ref.
2024	Visit Seoul Eps 1: Z-Line	Host	For Seoul Tourism Organization	

== Awards and nominations ==
Name of the award ceremony, year presented, category, nominee of the award, and the result of the nomination
Award ceremony	Year	Category	Nominee / Work	Result	Ref.
D Awards	2026	UPICK Global Choice – Girl	Giselle	Nominated	
Korea Grand Music Awards	2025	Fan Vote Artist – Female	Giselle	Nominated	
Korea Grand Music Awards	2025	Trend of the Year – K-pop Solo	Giselle	Nominated	
Korea Grand Music Awards	2025	Best Hip-Hop	"Skrr" (with Haon)	Nominated	
MAMA Awards	2025	Best Rap & Hip Hop Performance	"Skrr" (with Haon)	Nominated	
MAMA Awards	2025	Song of the Year	"Skrr" (with Haon)	Nominated	
TMELive International Music Awards	2026	Global Top Trend Song Top 10	"Tornado"	Won	
