= Ningning =

Chinese singer (born 2002)

- Ningning in 2026
- Born: Ning Yizhuo; October 23, 2002 (age 24); Harbin, Heilongjiang, China
- Education: Beijing Contemporary Music Academy
- Occupation: Singer
- Musical career
- Origin: Seoul, South Korea
- Genre: K-pop
- Instrument: Vocals
- Years active: 2016–present
- Labels: SM; Warner
- Member of: Aespa

Chinese name
- Simplified Chinese: 宁艺卓
- Traditional Chinese: 寧藝卓
- Hanyu Pinyin: Níng Yìzhuó
- Wade–Giles: Ning Icho

Ning Yizhuo (Chinese: 宁艺卓; born October 23, 2002), known professionally as Ningning (Korean: 닝닝), is a Chinese singer based in South Korea. She is a member of the South Korean girl group Aespa.

== Career ==
=== Early life and pre-debut ===
Ningning was born as Ning Yizhuo on October 23, 2002, in Harbin, China. She graduated from Harbin Normal University Middle School (哈尔滨师范大学附属中学) and Beijing Contemporary Music Academy (北京市现代音乐学校). During her early years, she was nicknamed "Ningning", which she would later use as her stage name in her career.

Ningning was scouted by SM Entertainment following her appearance on the Chinese singing TV show Let's Sing Kids. She was later introduced as a member of the pre-debut training team SM Rookies on September 19, 2016. As part of the team, she appeared on the Rookies Princess: Who's the Best? segment of the program My SMT that year, and recorded several covers for the Korean animated TV program Shining Star in 2017.

=== 2020–present: Debut and solo activities ===
After training for four years, Ningning was revealed as the third member of Aespa on October 28, 2020, introduced by SM as an "18-year-old Chinese member with an outstanding voice" through the company's official social media outlets. The group debuted on November 17, with the release of the digital single "Black Mamba".

In 2022, Ningning released an OST with fellow member Winter called "Once Again" as part of the official soundtrack of the South Korean drama Our Blues. The song charted at 119 on the Circle Digital Chart. In December, she participated in 2 tracks for SM's annual end-of-year compilation album 2022 Winter SM Town: SMCU Palace, "Time After Time" and "Good To Be Alive", with fellow SM label mates.

On July 30, 2023, Ningning released the single "WYA" with Jay Park. The song was a surprise collaboration for the WeTV show The Next 2023, where Jay Park appeared as a regular mentor. A remix of the single was subsequently released on August 13, featuring PH-1, Lexie Liu, ØZI, and Masiwei.

On March 12, 2024, Ningning released the OST "Count on Me" for drama The Midnight Studio. On March 15, she was announced as the MC for the first day of KCON 2024 in Hong Kong alongside Myung Jae-hyun of boy group BoyNextDoor.

== Endorsements ==
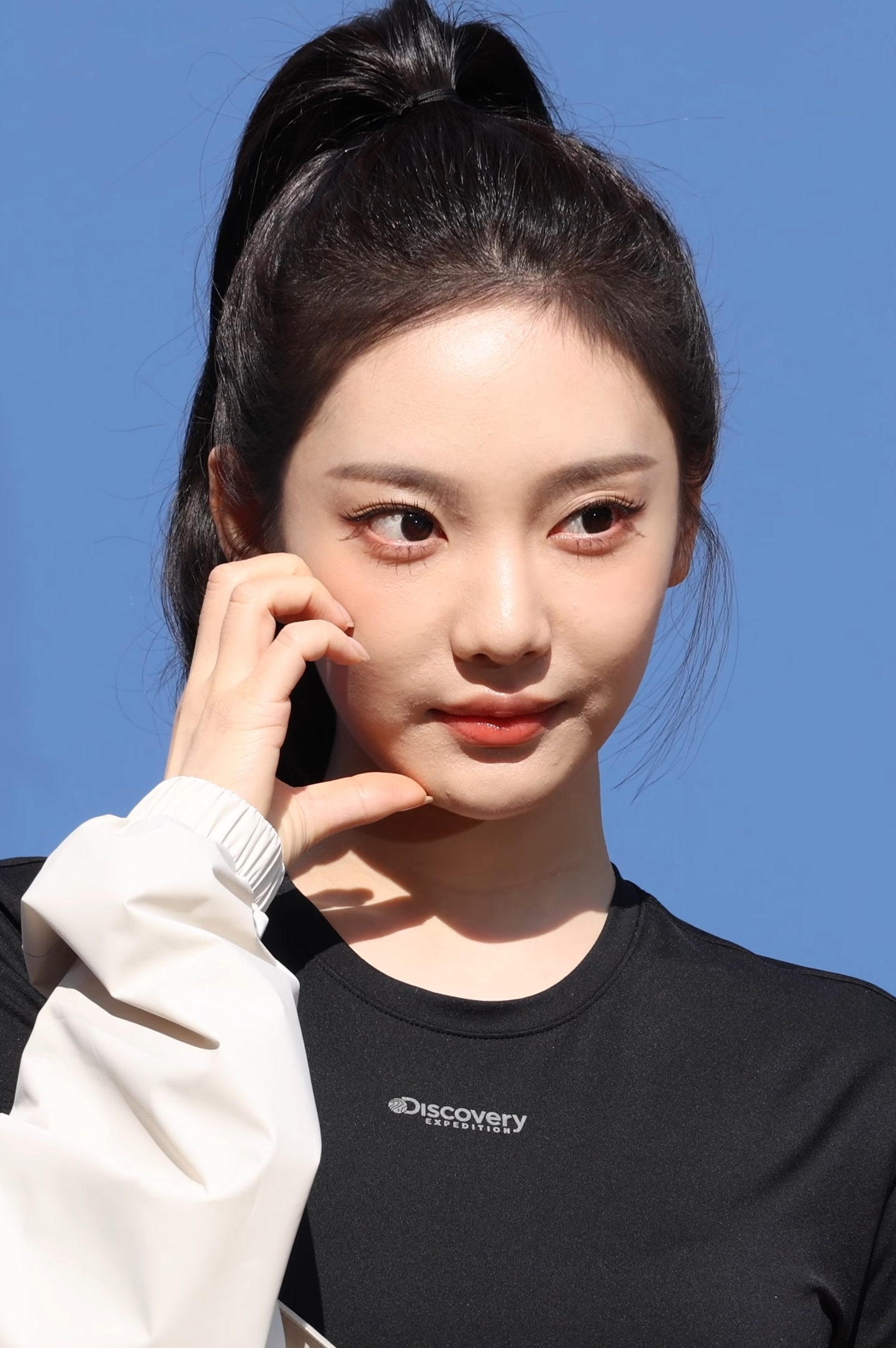
Ningning in 2026 at the Seoul Discovery Expedition event

On February 8, 2024, the Italian luxury fashion house Versace appointed Ningning as their global brand ambassador. In August, she became the global face of the Versace's Kleio Bag campaign. In November, she kicked off Versace's holiday campaign and starred in a campaign video.

On February 20, 2025, Ningning was selected as S/S season model for Fila's brand campaign at ABC Mart, and later on the 26th she was appointed as Maybelline New York's brand ambassador for North and Southeast Asia. In March, she became the brand ambassador of the feminine hygiene brand Kotex, with focus on their Chinese market. In June, she was selected as the collection model for the collaboration between Shushu/Tong and Haus Nowhere. In July, Ningning attended the opening of Alo's flagship store in Seoul as their newly appointed brand ambassador, and was formally announced as the brand's global ambassador in October. In mid-to-late July, she became the brand model of the South Korean skincare brands Dr. Jart+ and Olay Body Care for their Chinese market. In October, Ningning became the brand ambassador of the South Korean fashion brand Matin Kim for South Korean and Japanese markets, and presented their 2025 Winter campaign.

In February 2026, Ningning became the new ambassador of the clothing brand Discovery Expedition. In April, she became the global brand ambassador of the Italian luxury fashion house Gucci. In September, Ningning became an ambassador for italian luxury fashion house Bvlgari.

== Personal life ==
In an interview with Vogue China, Ningning confessed that she had undergone eye surgery as a child and "can barely see" with her right eye. Ningning revealed that she has attention deficit hyperactivity disorder (ADHD) during an appearance on BamBam's YouTube show, Bam Home, in 2023. She opened up about the stress it causes her, stating that she enjoys drawing and reading but her ADHD makes it difficult for her to focus.

She is a fan of American singer Frank Ocean.

== Public image ==
=== Controversial lamp post ===
Ningning's post from 2022 which showed a video of a lamp that she had recently purchased sparked criticism in Japan in November 2025. The lamp resembled a mushroom cloud of smoke that is often seen after a nuclear bomb explosion; Japanese netizens claimed the lamp resembles the atomic bombings of Hiroshima and Nagasaki during World War II. A petition was filed as a result and was reportedly signed by more than 100,000 people as of November 25, urging Japanese national broadcaster NHK to cancel Aespa's scheduled performance at New Year's Eve show Kōhaku Uta Gassen. A petition aimed to prevent Ningning from appearing on Japanese television received more than 100 million views on X. On November 17, NHK public relations department responded to the issue and clarified that Ningning "had no intention of downplaying or mocking the damage caused by the atomic bomb". Thus, NHK decided that Aespa will do their Kōhaku performance on December 31 as scheduled. On December 29, SM Entertainment announced that Ningning will not be participating in the Kōhaku performance due to health issues.

== Discography ==
=== Singles ===
==== As lead artist ====
List of singles as lead artist, showing year released, selected chart positions and album name
Title	Year	Peak chart positions	Album
Title	Year	CHN	Album
"WYA" (妳在哪裡) (with Jay Park or remix featuring PH-1, Lexie Liu, ØZI and Masiwei)	2023	63	Non-album single

==== As featured artist ====
List of singles as featured artist, showing year released, selected chart positions and album name
Title	Year	Peak chart positions	Album
Title	Year	KOR	Album
"Sip Ona Lil Sum'" (Jay Park featuring Ningning)	2024	—	The One You Wanted
"Because of You" (Minho featuring Ningning)	2024	— (Note: "Because Of You" didn't chart on the Circle Digital Chart but peaked at 79 on the component Download Chart.)	Call Back

=== Soundtrack appearances ===
List of soundtrack appearances, showing year released, selected chart positions and album name
Title	Year	Peak chart positions	Album
Title	Year	KOR	Album
"Once Again" (with Winter)	2022	119	Our Blues OST
"Count on Me"	2024	— (Note: "Count on Me" didn't chart on the Circle Digital Chart but peaked at 51 on the component Download Chart.)	The Midnight Studio OST
"—" denotes a recording that did not chart or was not released in that territory

=== Other charted songs ===
List of other charted songs, showing year released, selected chart positions and album name
Title	Year	Peak chart positions	Album
Title	Year	KOR	Album
"Snow Dream 2021" (with Yeri, Haechan, Chenle and Jisung)	2021	— (Note: "Snow Dream 2021" didn't chart on the Circle Digital Chart but peaked at 83 on the component Download Chart.)	2021 Winter SM Town: SMCU Express
"Time After Time" (원) (with BoA and Wendy)	2022	— (Note: "Time After Time" (원) didn't chart on the Circle Digital Chart but peaked at 89 on the component Download Chart.)	2022 Winter SM Town: SMCU Palace
"Bored!" (Note: Credited under Aespa but is a solo track performed by Ningning.)	2024	178	Synk: Parallel Line
"Ketchup and Lemonade"	2025	106	Synk: Aexis Line
"—" denotes releases that did not chart or were not released in that region.

=== Other appearances ===
List of other appearances, showing year released, other artist(s) credited and album name
Title	Year	Other artist(s)	Album
"Good to Be Alive"	2022	Hyo, Key, Chen, Johnny, Ginjo, Raiden, Imlay and Mar Vista	2022 Winter SM Town: SMCU Palace
"Melody"	2023	—N/a	The Next EP. 4 (Live Version)
"Miss This Life"	2025	League of Legends: Wild Rift and Fairlane	Non-album single

=== Composition credits ===
All song credits are adapted from the Korea Music Copyright Association's database unless stated otherwise.

List of songs, showing year released, artist name and album name
Title	Year	Artist	Album	Lyricist	Composer
"Bored! "	2024	Herself	Synk: Parallel Line	Yes	No
"Ketchup and Lemonade"	2025	Herself	Synk: Aexis Line	Yes	No
"Lollipop"	2026	Herself and Giselle	Synk: Aexis Line 2026	Yes	Yes
"I Love You But I Gotta Let You Go"	2026	Herself	Synk: Complaexity	Yes	Yes

== Filmography ==
=== Television shows ===
Year	Title	Role	Notes	Ref.
2011	China Got Talent	Contestant	Season 2	
2015	Let's Sing Kids	Contestant	Season 3	
2023	The Next 2023	Special Mentor	Episode 4	

=== Hosting ===
Year	Title	Notes	Ref.
2024	2024 KCON Hong Kong	Special MC (Day 1) with Myung Jae-hyun	

== Awards and nominations ==
Name of the award ceremony, year presented, category, nominee of the award, and the result of the nomination
Award ceremony	Year	Category	Nominee / Work	Result	Ref.
D Awards	2026	UPICK Global Choice – Girl	Ningning	Nominated	
Korea Grand Music Awards	2025	Fan Vote Artist – Female	Ningning	Nominated	
Korea Grand Music Awards	2025	Trend of the Year – K-pop Solo	Ningning	Nominated	
TMELive International Music Awards	2026	Global Top Trend Song Top 10	"Ketchup and Lemonade"	Won	
