= Karina (South Korean singer) =

South Korean singer and rapper (born 2000)

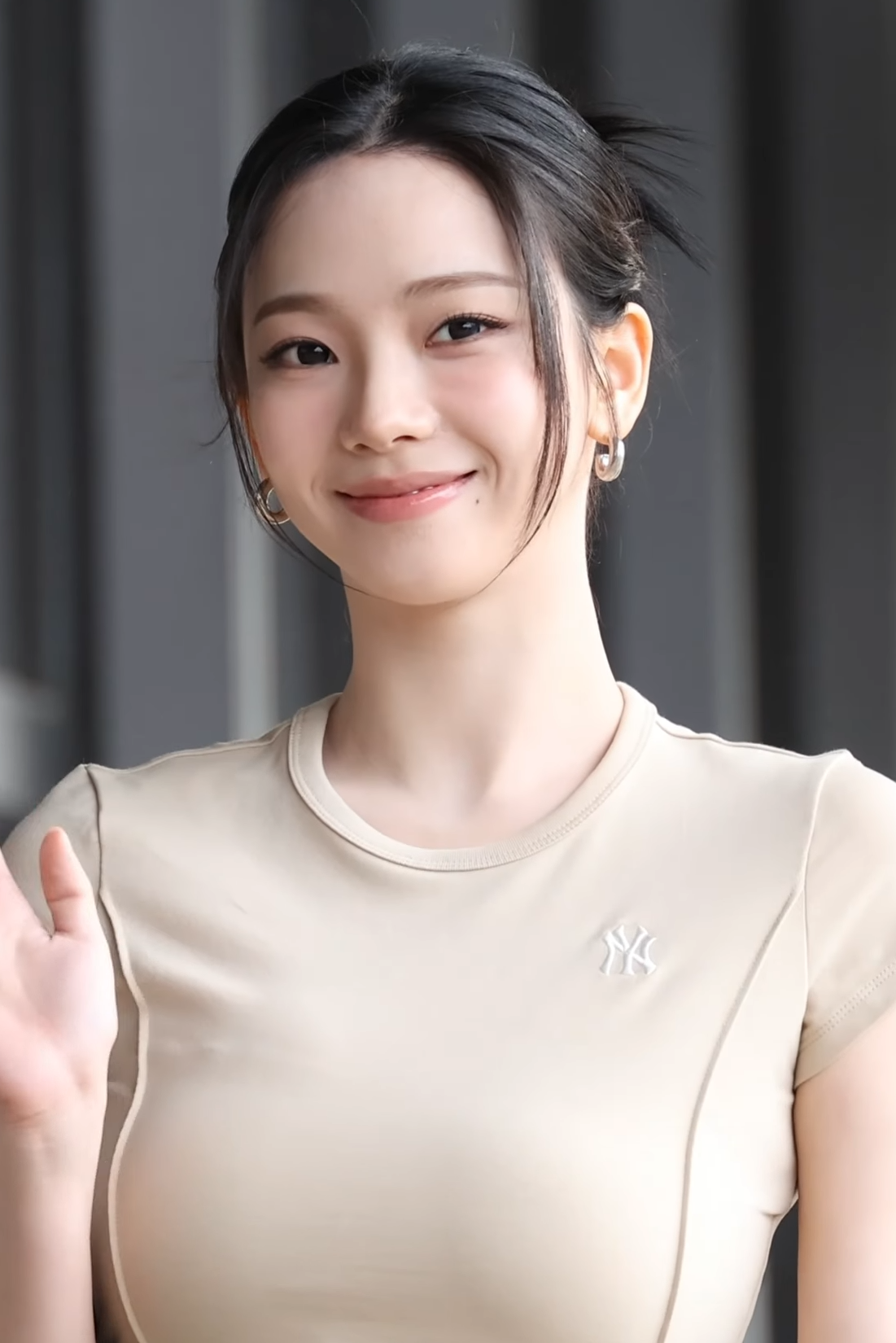
- Karina in 2026
- Born: Yu Ji-min; April 11, 2000 (age 26); Suwon, South Korea
- Occupations: Singer; rapper; dancer
- Musical career
- Genres: K-pop; hyperpop
- Instrument: Vocals
- Years active: 2020–present
- Labels: SM; Warner
- Member of: Aespa; Got the Beat
- Website: Official website

Korean name
- Hangul: 유지민
- Hanja: 劉知珉
- RR: Yu Jimin
- MR: Yu Chimin

Yu Ji-min (Korean: 유지민; born April 11, 2000), known professionally as Karina (카리나), is a South Korean singer, rapper and dancer. She is a member and leader of the South Korean girl group Aespa, formed by SM Entertainment in November 2020. She is also a member of the supergroup Got the Beat, which debuted in January 2022.

In 2024, Karina achieved her first top-ten song as a solo artist on the Circle Digital Chart, as well as her first-ever solo music show award from Show! Music Core, with "Up" from Aespa's digital single album Synk: Parallel Line.

== Early life and education ==
Karina was born and raised in Suwon, South Korea, in a family consisting of her parents and an older sister. She attended Hansol High School, located in Bundang, until she was discovered by an SM Entertainment representative through social media and trained for 4 years before her debut. She then dropped out to focus on training and later obtained a GED equivalent certificate.

Karina is Catholic and stated that her baptismal name is Katarina, which is the inspiration for her stage name.

== Career ==
=== Pre-debut ===
During her time as a trainee, Karina appeared in labelmate Taemin's music video for the song "Want" in February 2019, and performed with him on several music programs in the following weeks. Karina also appeared alongside labelmate Kai for Hyundai and SM's virtual showcase, The All-New Tucson, Beyond Drive.

=== 2020–present: Debut with Aespa, Got the Beat and solo ventures ===
On October 27, 2020, SM revealed Karina as the second member of Aespa. She debuted as the leader of the group on November 17, 2020, with the digital single "Black Mamba".

From October 30 to mid-December 2021, Karina hosted the show Travel Diary Soul: Seoul alongside David Lee McInnis as part of a tourist promotion by Seoul Metropolitan Government. The programme ran for 4 episodes and showcased tourist hotspots in the city. It was produced jointly with History Channel and aired to 39.5 million households in 19 countries. On December 17, she was announced as a member of SM's supergroup Got the Beat alongside bandmate Winter and other female labelmates such as BoA, Girls' Generation's Taeyeon and Hyoyeon, and Red Velvet's Seulgi and Wendy.

On May 11, 2023, MBC announced that Karina would be the special host of the May 13 episode of Show! Music Core alongside Lee Min-hyuk and Jungwoo. On September 22, Karina released the single "Sad Waltz" for the Netflix TV series Song of the Bandits. On November 30, it was announced that Karina will take part in the Netflix unscripted show Agents of Mystery. Filming for the show started in January 2024, with the first episode scheduled for release on June 18.

In May 2024, Karina appeared in KBS's variety music programme Synchro U as a cast member, where she won the Rookie Award – Show and Variety Category at the 2024 KBS Entertainment Awards. It was also confirmed on the same day that Karina will be a special DJ of the MBC FM4U's radio show Lee Seok-hoon's Brunch Cafe on April 18 and 19. On August 8, Karina was cast in the Mnet series My Arti Film. On November 22, she hosted the opening of the 26th MAMA Awards.

On April 21, 2025, Karina was announced to feature on Jannabi's single "May the Tenderness Be with You!" (사랑의이름으로!), the title track of the band's fourth studio album Sound of Music Pt. 1. The album and song were released on April 28. In late April, it was confirmed that she will be returning for the second season of the Netflix show Agents of Mystery, which is scheduled for release in 2026. That month she was also selected to host the SBS Ingalive Uni-con concert held at Tokyo Dome. On June 16, it was announced that Karina would perform solo at the Waterbomb festival on July 5 as part of her modeling contract with the sponsor of the festival Sprite. On November 13, SM Entertainment announced that they will release all solo tracks performed by the members during their tour, including Karina's solo track "Good Stuff", in a single album titled Synk: Aexis Line on November 17. That month, she was also confirmed to appear in season three of the Netflix travel show Getaway and Go with Jangdobari hosted by comedian Jang Do-yeon.

In February 2026, SM announced via Weverse that Karina will be holding her first fan-meeting on March 24 to hold an early birthday celebration in the Yes24 Live Hall.

== Artistry ==
=== Influences ===
Karina cites Camila Cabello and Girls' Generation as her role models and musical influences. She is also a fan of Kehlani, Tyla, IU, Taeyeon and Lee Hi. An in interview with Billboard ahead of Aespa's Coachella debut, Karina mentioned that the first Coachella performance she saw was Beyoncé's and that she "still can't forget her charisma and energy onstage". In Aespa's "Girls" music video, Karina drew widespread attention for paying tribute to the late singer Aaliyah by wearing a shirt featuring her image. In fashion, Karina considers American model Kendall Jenner as an inspiration and a role model; she said that Jenner's "power and aura as a model are incredible". She also named Jenner as her "biggest celebrity crush".

=== Musical style ===
In an interview with Harper's Bazaar Korea, Karina stated that she loves R&B and Jazz music although she can not imagine herself singing it and that hip-hop is her "main genre" but she "would love to do R&B and Jazz at least once". In another interview, Karina opened up about her involvement in her solo projects, revealing that she "participated in writing the lyrics, developing the choreography, directing the stage, selecting costumes, and shaping the camera composition".

== Public image and influence ==
SM introduced Karina as a multi-talented member ahead of her official debut, highlighting her skills in dance, vocals, and rap. Following the release of her debut introduction video, the phrase "Karina is a God" began circulating among fans and media, reflecting her emerging public image and perceived role within the group. She is also widely recognised for popularising the expression "AI-generated-like face", which has since been used by media outlets and K-pop fans to describe celebrities with highly symmetrical or flawless features. Karina has been cited as a role model by others in the K-pop industry, such as Rescene's Woni, Say My Name's Seungjoo and Soha, and Hearts2Hearts' Jiwoo.

Publications such as Paper have described her as "a dynamic dancer, an attentive leader, and a sultry rapper", while her growing presence across various fields has contributed to her recognition among South Korea's MZ generation. Media outlets including Nate News have referred to her as an "icon of the MZ generation" due to her skills, charisma, stage presence, and fanbase. Digital newspaper TVDaily featured her on their list of the top idols that dominated the year 2025 and noted that Karina, as the face of the group, "she played a key role in expanding their fandom both domestically and internationally and contributed greatly to elevating Aespa's brand value". Billboard included her on their K-pop Artist 100 list and recognized her as "an all-rounder skilled in vocals, rap and dance" who "showcased her individuality through solo stages [...] highlighting her lyrical participation and interpretive performance". Since 2021, Karina has also consistently ranked highly in the annual Pride Month survey of the 100 most popular female idols among queer Korean women.

The media has reported on the impact of Karina's advertising; After attending Prada's Fall/Winter 2025 womenswear show, global influencer marketing platform Lefty reported that Karina generated $14M in Earned Media Vaule (EMV) and $4.5M in Media Impact Value (MIV), noting that she accounted for 44 percent of Prada's total EMV during the event. Since she became the face of Musinsa Beauty in 2024, it was reported that the brand's cumulative sales increased by 94% from January to August of that year compared to the same period in the previous years. According to a report released by media analytics firm Onclusive in 2025, when Karina was appointed as Nike's global ambassador, she become the brand's most-mentioned ambassador on social media with Nike also being the most-mentioned brand with 15.1 million mentions. MLB Korea collaborated with Karina to release a limited-edition baseball cap bearing her autograph. It sold-out within minutes of its release on the official MLB online store and e-commerce company Musinsa. The cap enjoyed high demand on second-hand trading platforms, and was traded for over ₩200,000 on a second-hand trading platform owned by Naver, which is higher than the regular price.

Her appearance on Lee Young-ji's YouTube show Not Much Prepared was the most-watched video on YouTube Korea in 2023. In 2024, Karina recommended 내게 무해한 사람 (A Person Harmless to Me) by Choi Eun-young, a feminist book about love, friendship, and growth among women. SBS News reported that the book became a trend among readers in their 20s, soaring 157% in popularity.

In May 2025, Karina drew attention after posting an Instagram photo in which she wore a red jacket with the label "No. 2" during the days leading up to the 2025 South Korean presidential election. Though no further explanation accompanied the picture, some interpreted the post as a reference to the conservative People Power Party, which is associated with the color red and the number two on the ballot. The photo sparked controversy online, with critics accusing her of implicitly endorsing a candidate. Karina deleted the image shortly afterward, later issuing a statement apologizing for the post and stating there were no political intentions behind it. The incident drew wider attention to the expectation that Korean idols maintain political neutrality and refrain from wearing colors or making gestures associated with political parties during election periods. In July, while being interviewed by singer Jung Jae-hyung, Karina reflected on the controversy, saying "I really wanted to emphasize that I didn't mean anything by [the post]. I was so ignorant". She then offered a detailed explanation: "I went out with the [company] staff in the cold weather, bought a jacket, and just posted to communicate with my fans", concluding with an apology.

== Other activities ==
=== Endorsements ===
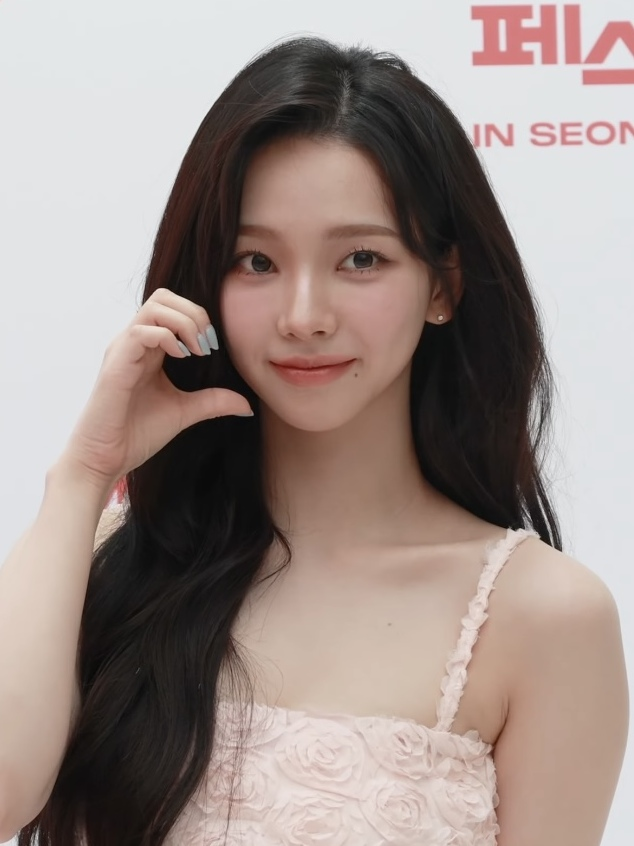
Karina at the Musinsa Beauty Festa in 2024

In 2021, Karina topped South Korea's brand reputation rankings for K-pop artists and influencers for two consecutive months. She also led Star News' female idol category for eight weeks. In the Korean Business Research Institute's monthly "Individual Girl Group Members Brand Power Ranking", she placed first in the June and July issues and fourth in October. She was featured in the Seoul Metropolitan Government's "Tour Promotion Program". Her brand collaborations began in April 2022 when she was selected as the goodwill ambassador for Maeil Business Newspaper's "Clean Campaign". In November 2023, Lotte Chilsung selected her as model for its "Kloud Krush" alcohol beverage. In December, Vogue Korea announced her as the new face of YSL Beauty's "Rouge Pur Couture" lipstick line.

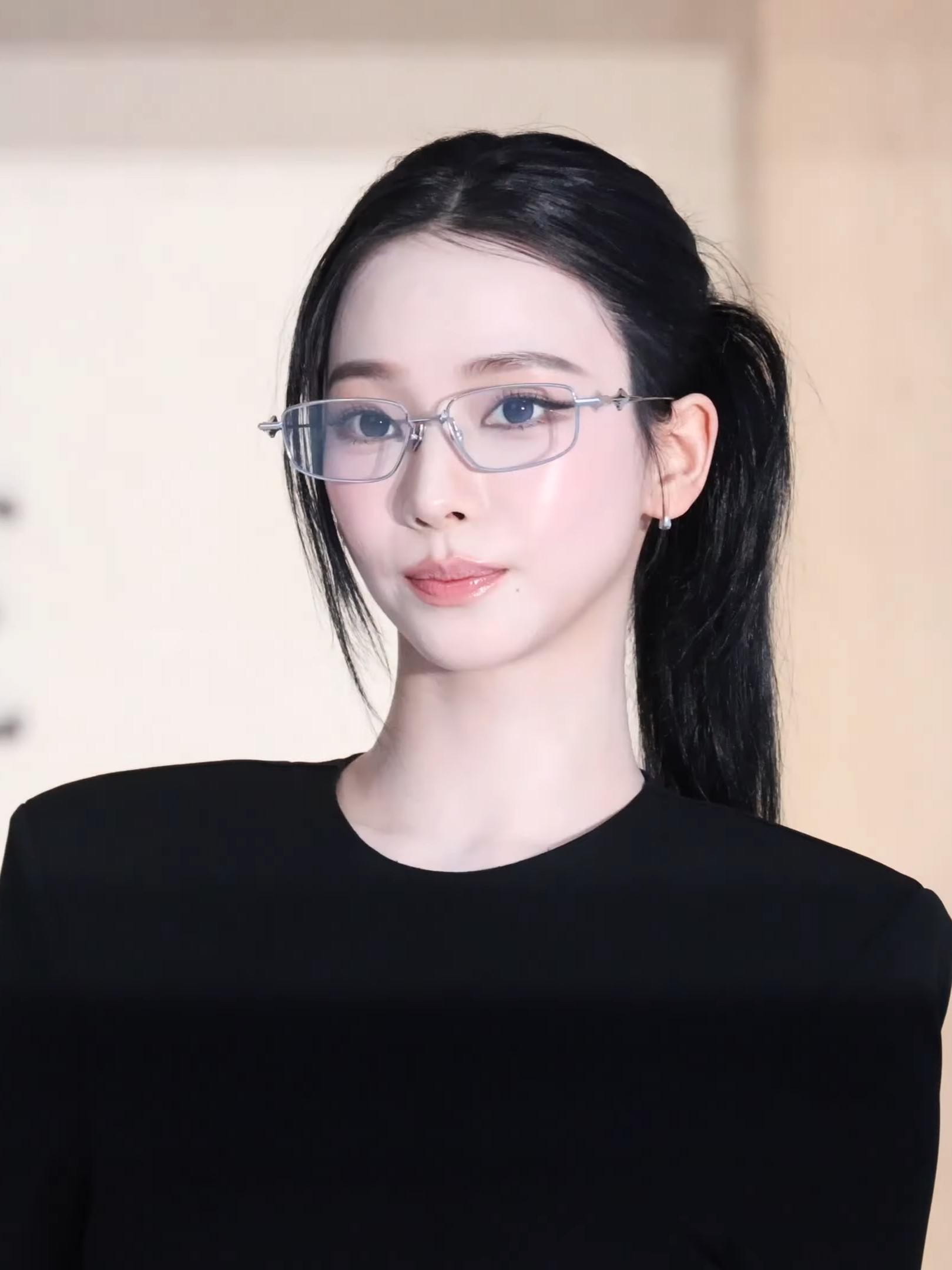
Karina attending Gentle Monster's "Future Retail" pop-up in 2025

In January 2024, Converse Korea appointed Karina as its new ambassador. In April, she became the model for the Vitamin C drink Vita 500 Zero. In August, she was named ambassador and model for Musinsa's Musinsa Beauty, was appointed global brand ambassador for Prada. She later appeared in the brand's 2024 Holiday Campaign. In September, she became the muse of the Danish outdoor brand Nordisk. In December, Shinsegae selected her to lead its "Hello, New Santa" Christmas campaign, which was screened at Shinsegae Square. The campaign received the Gold Award in the Social Communication – Brand Channel Operation category at the 2025 Korea Advertising Awards.

In January 2025, Pascucci appointed Karina as its first celebrity model since the franchise entered South Korea in 2002. In February, she was announced as the new model for Sprite. In May, MLB Korea appointed her as their new brand ambassador, and she became the face of the "Pocket Collection" campaign by Gentle Monster and Bratz. In July, she was named global brand spokesperson for Nike, becoming the first Korean celebrity and first female K-pop idol to hold the position. In August, she appeared on the September cover of Harper's Bazaar Korea's "Icons Issue" featuring Bulgari's jewellery. She was later named the newest brand ambassador of Chanel Beauty through W Korea photoshoot for the November issue. In December, Karina appeared alongside Byeon Woo-seok and Jang Won-young for Google Gemini's advertising campaign titled "The Christmas Song".

In January 2026, Karina appeared on the cover of the February issue of men's magazine Esquire Korea, in collaboration with Prada to promote the brand's Spring/Summer womenswear collection. In February, she was selected as the first female model and the first K-pop idol to model for K Car, a South Korean automobile distribution and used car company. In April, she was announced as the first female brand ambassador for Japanese luxury golf brand Mark & Lona. In May, Karina appeared on the cover of the May issue of Harper's Bazaar Korea with Chanel Beauty and made her Met Gala debut with Prada. On May 7, it was announced that a Google Play campaign featuring Karina and Faker would be released on May 15. That same month Karina worked with Gentle Monster again to unveil their 2026 Veggie Collection, and she was also selected as the advertising model of the wellness brand Condition. In June, Karina returned to Converse as their global brand ambassador, previously working as the brand's Korean brand ambassador from 2024 to 2025.

=== Philanthropy ===
In March 2025, Karina donated ₩100 million (US$74,611.5) through the Hope Bridge National Disaster Relief Association to help with recovery efforts from wildfires that occurred in the Ulsan, Gyeongbuk, and Gyeongnam regions. In January 2026, she volunteered as a childcare assistant at the "House of Life", a housing for pregnant women, single mothers and their children.

== Discography ==
=== Singles ===
==== As lead artist ====
List of singles as lead artist, showing year released, selected chart positions and album name
Title	Year	Peak chart position	Album
Title	Year	KOR DL	Album
"The Cure" (with Kangta, BoA, U-Know, Leeteuk, Taeyeon, Onew, Suho, Irene, Taeyong, Mark and Kun)	2023	39	2022 Winter SM Town: SMCU Palace

==== As featured artist ====
List of featured singles, showing year released, selected chart positions and album name
Title	Year	Peak chart position	Album
Title	Year	KOR	Album
"May the Tenderness Be with You! " (사랑의이름으로!) (with Jannabi)	2025	82	Sound of Music Pt. 1

=== Soundtrack appearances ===
List of soundtrack appearances, showing year released, selected chart positions and album name
Title	Year	Peak chart position	Album
Title	Year	KOR BGM	Album
"Sad Waltz"	2023	105	Song of the Bandits OST

=== Other charted songs ===
List of other charted songs, showing year released, selected chart positions, and name of the album
Title	Year	Peak chart position								Certifications	Album
Title	Year	KOR	HK	JPN Hot	MLY	NZ Hot	SGP	TW	WW	Certifications	Album
"Hot & Cold" (온도차) (with Kai, Seulgi and Jeno)	2022	— (Note: "Hot & Cold" did not enter the Circle Digital Chart, but debuted and peaked at number 47 on the component Download Chart.)	—	—	—	—	—	—	—		2022 Winter SM Town: SMCU Palace
"Up" (Note: Credited under Aespa but is a solo track performed by Karina.)	2024	2	9	50	12	17	11	3	27	RIAJ: Gold (st.)	Synk: Parallel Line
"Good Stuff"	2025	69	—	—	—	—	—	—	—		Synk: Aexis Line
"—" denotes releases that did not chart or were not released in that region.

=== Composition credits ===
All song credits are adapted from the Korea Music Copyright Association's database unless stated otherwise.

List of songs, showing year released, artist name, and name of the album
Title	Year	Artist	Album	Lyricist	Composer	Ref.
"Menagerie" (Note: Unreleased song that was performed by Karina at Synk: Hyper Line.)	2023	Karina	Non-album singles	Yes	No	
"Regret of the Times"	2024	Aespa	Non-album singles	Yes	No	
"Up"	2024	Karina	Synk: Parallel Line	Yes	No	
"Good Stuff"	2025	Karina	Synk: Aexis Line	Yes	No	
"16 Bit"	2026	Karina	Synk: Compaexity	Yes	No	

== Videography ==
=== Music videos ===
Title	Year	Director(s)	Ref.
"The Cure" (with Kangta, BoA, U-Know, Leeteuk, Taeyeon, Onew, Suho, Irene, Taeyong, Mark and Kun)	2023	Hong MinHo (Studio Achilles)	

=== Music video appearances ===
Year	Song title	Artist	Ref.
2019	"Want"	Taemin	
2023	"Vuja De"	U-Know	
2025	"Too Bad"	G-Dragon featuring Anderson .Paak	

== Filmography ==
=== Television shows ===
Year	Title	Role	Notes	Ref.
2021	Travel Diary Soul: Seoul	Host	For Seoul Metropolitan Government	
2024	Synchro U	Cast member		

=== Web series ===
Year	Title	Role	Notes	Ref.
2024	My Arti Film	Herself	Episode: "Up"	

=== Web shows ===
Year	Title	Role	Ref.
2024	Agents of Mystery	Cast member	
2025	Getaway and Go with Jangdobari	Travel mate	
2026	Agents of Mystery Season 2	Cast member	

=== Hosting ===
Year	Title	Notes	Ref.
2023	Show! Music Core	Special MC with Jungwoo and Lee Min-hyuk	
2025	SBS Ingalive Uni-Con in Tokyo Dome	with Yook Sung-jae	
2025	Music Bank	Special MC with Moon Sang-min	
2026	Show! Music Core	Special MC with Dohoon and Gyuvin	

=== Radio shows ===
Year	Title	Notes	Ref.
2024	Lee Seok-hoon's Brunch Cafe	Special DJ on April 18–19	

== Accolades ==
=== Awards and nominations ===
Name of the award ceremony, year presented, category, nominee of the award, and the result of the nomination
Award ceremony	Year	Category	Nominee / Work	Result	Ref.
Asia Artist Awards	2026	Popularity Award – Solo (Female)	Karina	Pending	
Brand Customer Loyalty Awards (Note: Co-organized by the Korean Customers Council and Brand Keys, this event recognizes the most influential brands in society and culture, as determined through consumer research.)	2025	Female Advertising Model	Herself	Won	
D Awards	2026	UPICK Global Choice – Girl	Herself	Won	
iHeartRadio Music Awards	2025	Favorite K-pop Dance Challenge	"Up"	Nominated	
KBS Entertainment Awards	2024	Rookie Award – Show and Variety Category	Herself	Won	
Korea First Brand Awards (Note: Hosted by the Korea Consumer Brand Committee and the Korea Consumer Forum, the Korea First Brand Awards based its winners on a nationwide South Korean survey.)	2025	Female Idol Variety Star	Herself	Won	
Korea First Brand Awards	2025	Female Solo Artist	Herself	Won	
Korea Grand Music Awards	2025	Fan Vote Artist – Female	Herself	Nominated	
Korea Grand Music Awards	2025	Trend of the Year – K-pop Solo	Herself	Nominated	
K-World Dream Awards	2025	Girl Solo Popularity Award	Herself	Nominated	
KOPA & Nikon Press Photo Awards	2026	Photogenic of the Year	Herself	Won	
MAMA Awards	2025	Best Dance Performance – Female Solo	"Up"	Nominated	
MAMA Awards	2025	Song of the Year	"Up"	Nominated	
TMELive International Music Awards	2026	Global Top Trend Song Top 10	"Good Stuff"	Won	

=== Listicles ===
Name of publisher, year listed, name of listicle, and placement
Publisher	Year	Listicle	Placement	Ref.
Forbes	2026	Forbes Korea Power Celebrity 40	37th	
