= Winter (singer) =

South Korean singer and dancer (born 2001)

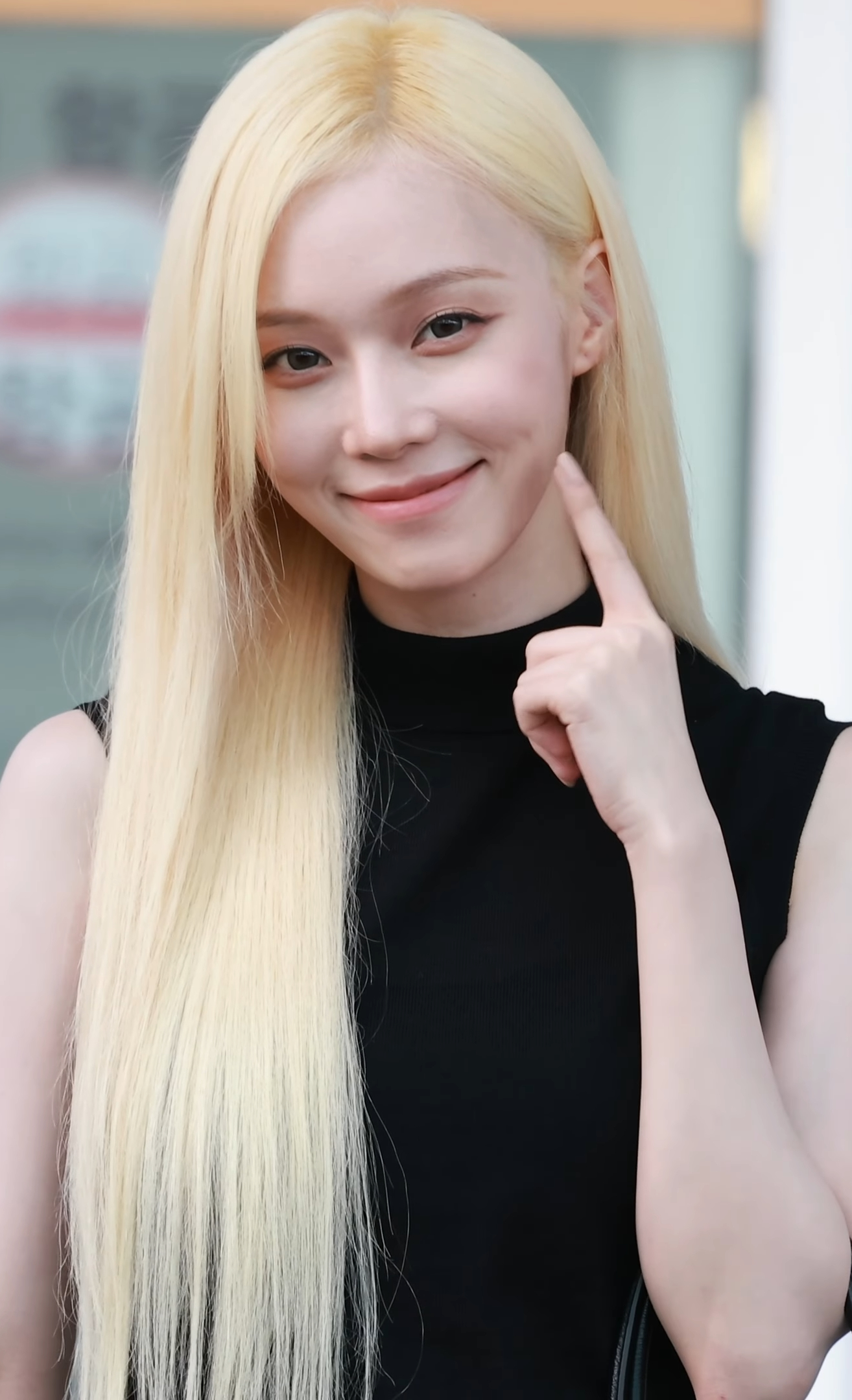
- Winter in 2026
- Born: Kim Min-jeong; January 1, 2001 (age 25); Busan, South Korea
- Occupations: Singer; dancer
- Musical career
- Instrument: Vocals
- Years active: 2020–present
- Label: SM
- Member of: Aespa; Got the Beat
- Website: Official website

Korean name
- Hangul: 김민정
- Hanja: 金旼炡
- RR: Gim Minjeong
- MR: Kim Minjŏng

Kim Min-jeong (Korean: 김민정; born January 1, 2001), known professionally as Winter (윈터), is a South Korean singer and dancer. She is a member of the South Korean girl group Aespa which debuted under SM Entertainment in November 2020. In January 2022, she became a member of Got the Beat, a supergroup of female singers under SM.

== Early life ==
Kim Min-jeong was born on January 1, 2001, in Nampo-dong, Busan, South Korea. Growing up in a family with several members in the armed forces (including her father, older brother, and other relatives), she originally considered a career in this field.

Winter went to Yangsan Samsung Middle School and learned to play multiple instruments, such as piano and guitar and played various sports such as bowling, kendo, fencing, basketball, and badminton. She was also in the school's dance club. She attended Yangsan Girls' High School until she was discovered by an SM talent scout while performing at a dance festival at her school in 2016. Prior to being scouted, she had never shared her aspirations of becoming a singer with her parents, who were surprised by her decision to audition. She shared that during the audition, she had to sing for more than three to four hours. She was accepted and dropped out of high school to immediately begin her training. She later took her GED exam and passed.

Winter was trained vocally by SM Entertainment's in-house vocal coaches, including Yoo Young-jin who was a longtime producer of the agency before his departure in 2023. She was also a student of Waackxxxy, a South Korean dancer who specializes in waacking.

== Career ==
=== 2020–present: Debut in Aespa, Got the Beat and solo activities ===
Winter trained for four years, and in 2020 she was revealed as the first member of Aespa, a group with a metaverse concept under SM Entertainment, and the company's first girl group since Red Velvet in 2014. They debuted with the single, "Black Mamba" on November 17. On December 6, Winter participated in a tribute to her labelmate and SM Entertainment senior BoA, in celebration of her 20th anniversary, and performed a cover of her song "ID; Peace B" at the 2020 Mnet Asian Music Awards.

In 2022, SM Entertainment created a supergroup composed of their female artists as a counterpart to their male supergroup, SuperM. The Girls On Top project's first unit, Got the Beat, would have 7 members: Winter and her fellow Aespa member Karina, Girls' Generation's Taeyeon and Hyoyeon, Red Velvet's Wendy and Seulgi and BoA. The group made their debut on New Year's Day at the 2022 SM Town Live Concert with the single "Step Back", which was officially released on January 3. After making their debut stage on M! Countdown, her individual fancam for "Step Back" went viral and became the fastest female idol fancam in history to amass 10 million views, reaching it in only 25 days. In the same year, she released a duet with fellow Aespa member Ningning called "Once Again" as part of the official soundtrack of the South Korean drama Our Blues. The song charted at 119 on the Gaon Digital Chart. In December, she participated in two tracks for the 2022 Winter SM Town: SMCU Palace, "Jet" and "Priority", which featured her labelmates in SM Entertainment.

In 2023 she released a collaboration with Super Junior's Yesung called "Floral Sense" for his second studio album's reissue, Sensory Flows. The song and its accompanying music video featuring Winter were released on February 27. Months later, Winter, along with Yim Si-wan, were appointed as the ambassadors of the 2024 World Team Table Tennis Championships which would be held in Busan, the hometown of both singers. To promote the event, Winter and Yim Si-wan released the song "Win For You" on September 21 as the event's official theme song. In November, she released a collaborative song with (G)I-dle's Soyeon and Ive's Liz titled "Nobody", which was released on November 16. In the same month, she was announced to be a part of the official soundtrack of the South Korean drama Castaway Diva and released the song "Voyage" on November 19. Winter was also revealed to be part of the lineup for the official soundtrack of the South Korean drama My Demon and released the song "With You" on December 8.

On March 14, 2024, it was announced that Winter would collaborate with Bang Ye-dam on the single "Officially Cool", released on April 2. On July 3, she released "The First Moment" as the theme song for the animated film Heartsping: Teenieping of Love. The song was nominated for Best OST at the 2024 Korea Grand Music Awards. In October 2024, she released "Spark" for Synk: Parallel Line and participated in its lyrics writing and composition. On December 1, 2024, she released "Hunjung Yeonsuh" for the soundtrack of The Tale of Lady Ok. On April 19, 2025, she released "On Such A Day" for the soundtrack of Resident Playbook. In November 2025, she released "Blue", which she co-wrote, as part of Synk: Aexis Line.

== Endorsements ==
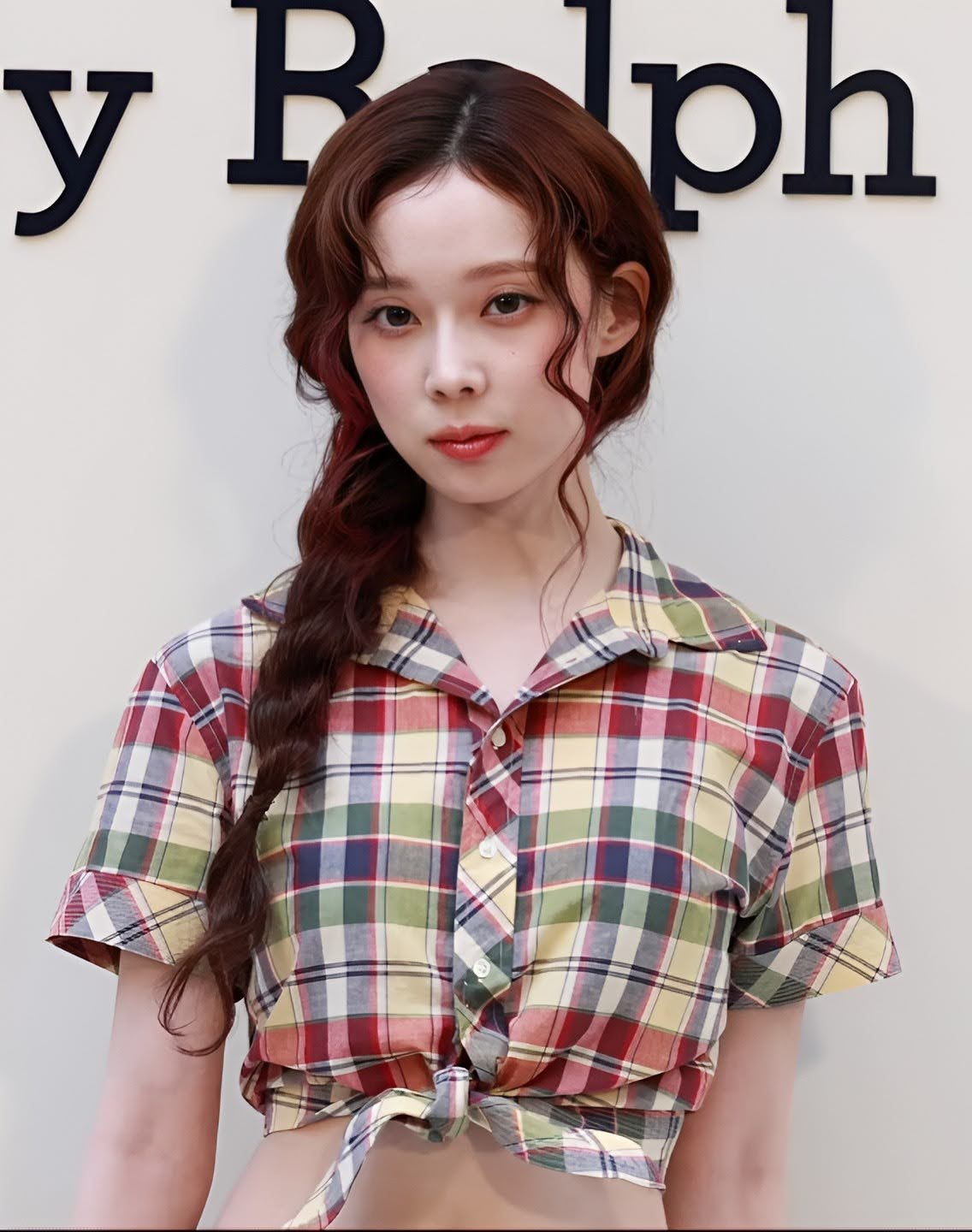
Winter promoting Polo by Ralph Lauren in March 2025

In October 2023, Winter became the brand ambassador of the South Korean skincare and cosmetics brand Mamonde, and in November, she became the face of Polo Ralph Lauren in South Korea. A month later, it was announced that she would be the ambassador of the South Korean cosmetics brand Espoir, another brand owned by Amorepacific Corporation after Mamonde, and eventually became their global ambassador.

In April 2024, Winter was announced as the new model for the South Korean isotonic drink Toreta, and was appointed as the ambassador of New Balance in October. During her term as their ambassador, the UNI Flying 77 Superlight Goose Down jacket she advertised was sold out within 2 minutes during its pre-sale, with over 10,000 customers attempting to buy it. In May 2025, she became the advertising model of Yuhan-Kimberly, a South Korean health and hygiene company created by Yuhan Corporation and the American-based Kimberly-Clark, for their feminine hygiene line called White.

In January 2026, Winter was appointed global brand ambassador for skincare brand AHC, representing its Pro Derm Aesthe and T-Shot collections.

== Personal life ==
=== Ancestry and religion ===
Her family comes from the Gimhae Kim clan, the 22nd generation of the Samhyeonpa branch, and are Buddhist, though she has stated that she herself is not particularly religious.

=== Health ===
On April 12, 2024, SM entertainment confirmed that Winter had undergone surgery after suffering a collapsed lung.

=== Philanthropy ===
In March 2025, Winter donated ₩100 million to the Korean Red Cross to support relief efforts following wildfires in the Yeongnam region. In March 2026, she donated ₩100 million each to the UNICEF Korea Committee and Samsung Medical Center, and was inducted into the UNICEF Honors Club.

== Discography ==
=== Singles ===
==== As lead artist ====
List of singles as lead artist, showing year released, selected chart positions and album name
Title	Year	Peak chart positions		Album
Title	Year	KOR	KOR Down.	Album
"Win for You" (ITTF World Team Table Tennis Championships Finals Busan 2024 Official Theme Song) (with Yim Si-wan)	2023	—	185	Non-album singles
"Nobody" (with Soyeon and Liz)	2023	—	11	Non-album singles
"Officially Cool" (with Bang Yedam)	2024	—	39	Non-album singles
"Speed of Summer" (여름의 속도)	2026	69	—	Non-album singles
"—" denotes releases that did not chart.

==== As featured artist ====
List of singles as featured artist, showing year released, selected chart positions and album name
Title	Year	Peak chart positions	Album
Title	Year	KOR Down.	Album
"Floral Sense" (Yesung featuring Winter)	2023	62	Floral Sense (Special Version)

=== Soundtrack appearances ===
List of soundtrack appearances, showing year released, selected chart positions and album name
Title	Year	Peak chart positions	Album
Title	Year	KOR	Album
"Once Again" (with Ningning)	2022	119	Our Blues OST
"Voyage" (항해)	2023	130	Castaway Diva OST
"With You"	2023	— (Note: "With You" did not enter the Circle Digital Chart, but peaked at number 32 on the component Download Chart.)	My Demon OST
"The Moment I First Saw You" (처음 본 순간)	2024	— (Note: "The Moment I First Saw You" did not enter the Circle Digital Chart, but peaked at number 66 on the component Download Chart.)	Heartsping: Teenieping of Love OST
"Hunjung Yeonsuh" (헌정연서)	2024	— (Note: "Hunjung Yeonsuh" did not enter the Circle Digital Chart, but peaked at number 18 on the component Download Chart.)	The Tale of Lady Ok OST
"On Such a Day" (그런 날)	2025	— (Note: "On Such a Day" did not enter the Circle Digital Chart, but peaked at number 23 on the component Download Chart.)	Resident Playbook OST
"—" denotes releases that did not chart or were not released in that region.

=== Other charted songs ===
List of other charted songs, showing year released, selected chart positions, and name of the album
Title	Year	Peak chart positions	Album
Title	Year	KOR	Album
"Jet" (with Eunhyuk, Hyo, Taeyong, Jaemin, Sungchan and Giselle)	2022	— (Note: "Jet" did not enter the Circle Digital Chart, but peaked at number 108 on the component Download Chart.)	2022 Winter SM Town: SMCU Palace
"Priority" (with Max Changmin and Taeyeon)	2022	— (Note: "Priority" did not enter the Circle Digital Chart, but peaked at number 57 on the component Download Chart.)	2022 Winter SM Town: SMCU Palace
"Spark" (Note: Credited under Aespa but is a solo track performed by Winter.)	2024	100	Synk: Parallel Line
"Blue"	2025	96	Synk: Aexis Line

=== Composition credits ===
All song credits are adapted from the Korea Music Copyright Association's database unless stated otherwise.

List of songs, showing year released, artist name, and name of the album
Title	Year	Artist	Album	Lyricist	Composer
"Spark"	2024	Herself	Synk: Parallel Line	Yes	Yes
"Blue"	2025	Herself	Synk: Aexis Line	Yes	No

== Videography ==
=== Music videos ===
Title	Year	Director(s)	Ref.
As lead artist
"Nobody" (with Soyeon and Liz)	2023	Zanybros	
"Officially Cool" (with Bang Yedam)	2024	SNP Film	
As featured artist
"Floral Sense" (Yesung featuring Winter)	2023	Unknown	

=== Music video appearances ===
Year	Title	Artist	Ref.
2021	"Free to Fly"	Kangta	

== Awards and nominations ==
Name of the award ceremony, year presented, category, nominee of the award, and the result of the nomination
Award ceremony	Year	Category	Nominee / Work	Result	Ref.
Asia Artist Awards	2026	Popularity Award – Solo (Female)	Winter	Pending	
Asian Pop Music Awards	2025	Best OST	"Hunjung Yeonsuh" (from The Tale of Lady Ok)	Nominated	
D Awards	2026	UPICK Global Choice – Girl	Winter	Nominated	
KM Chart Awards	2026	Best Popular Solo Female Award	Winter	Won	
Korea Grand Music Awards	2024	Best OST	"The First Moment" (from Heartsping: Teenieping of Love)	Nominated	
Korea Grand Music Awards	2025	Fan Vote Artist – Female	Winter	Nominated	
Korea Grand Music Awards	2025	Trend of the Year – K-pop Solo	Winter	Nominated	
Korea Grand Music Awards	2025	Best OST	"On Such a Day" (from Resident Playbook)	Nominated	
Seoul International Drama Awards	2025	OST Award	"Hunjung Yeonsuh" (from The Tale of Lady Ok)	Nominated	
TMELive International Music Awards	2026	Global Top Trend Song Top 10	"Blue"	Won	
