= List of NCT Dream live performances =

NCT Dream live performances
- Concert tours: 4

The South Korean boy band NCT Dream has headlined four concert tours and participated in joint tours with the musical collective SM Town.

== Concert tours ==
=== Headlining ===
List of headlining concert tours, with dates, associated album(s), location(s), and number of shows
| Title | Dates | Associated album(s) | Continent(s) | Shows | Ref. |
|---|---|---|---|---|---|
| The Dream Show | November 15, 2019 – March 1, 2020 | The First; We Young; We Go Up; We Boom | Asia | 11 | |
| The Dream Show 2: In A Dream | September 8, 2022 – July 11, 2023 | Hot Sauce; Glitch Mode; Candy | Asia; Europe; North America; South America | 41 | |
| The Dream Show 3: Dream( )scape | May 2, 2024 – December 1, 2024 | ISTJ; Dream()scape; Dreamscape | Asia; Europe; North America; South America | 37 | |
| The Dream Show 4: Dream the Future | July 10, 2025 – March 29, 2026 | Go Back to the Future; Beat It Up | Asia | 26 | |

=== Joint ===
List of joint concert tours, with headlining act, dates, associated album, locations, and number of shows
| Title | Headlining act | Dates | Associated album(s) | Continents/countries | Shows | Ref. |
|---|---|---|---|---|---|---|
| SM Town Live World Tour VI | SM Town | July 8, 2017 – April 6, 2018 | —N/a | Japan; South Korea; United Arab Emirates | 6 | |
| SM Town Live 2022: SMCU Express | SM Town | August 20–29, 2022 | 2021 Winter SM Town: SMCU Express | Japan; South Korea | 4 | |
| SM Town Live 2023: SMCU Palace | SM Town | January 1, 2023 – February 22, 2024 | 2022 Winter SM Town: SMCU Palace | Indonesia; Japan | 3 | |
| NCT Nation: To the World | NCT | August 26–September 17, 2023 | Golden Age | Japan; South Korea | 5 | |
| SM Town Live 2025: The Culture, the Future | SM Town | January 11, 2025 – February 14, 2026 | 2025 SM Town: The Culture, the Future | Asia; Europe; North America | 10 | |

== Concerts ==
=== Headlining ===
List of headlining concerts, with date, platform, and performed songs
| Title | Date | Platform | Performed songs | Ref. |
|---|---|---|---|---|
| Beyond the Dream Show | May 10, 2020 | Beyond Live | "Go"; "Drippin'"; "We Go Up"; "Stronger"; "Dunk Shot"; "Chewing Gum"; "Don't Need Your Love"; "We Young"; "Best Friend"; "Candle Light"; "Puzzle Piece"; "7 Days"; "Ridin'; "Quiet Down"; "Boom" | |
| Dream Stage: Glitch Mode | April 5, 2022 | Beyond Live | "My First and Last"; "Glitch Mode"; "Never Goodbye" (Note: Incomplete set list) | |

=== Joint ===
List of joint concerts, with headlining act, date(s), location or platform(s), and performed song(s)
| Title | Headlining act | Date(s) | Venue/platform(s) | City | Country | Performed song(s) | Ref. |
|---|---|---|---|---|---|---|---|
| SM Town Special Stage | SM Town | January 18–19, 2019 | Estadio Nacional | Santiago | Chile | —N/a | |
| SM Town Live | SM Town | August 3–5, 2019 | Tokyo Dome | Tokyo | Japan | —N/a | |
| 2020 K-Pop x K-Art Concert Super KPA | —N/a | November 27, 2020 | Beyond Live | —N/a | | —N/a | |
| Resonance: Global Wave | NCT | December 27, 2020 | Beyond Live | —N/a | | "Ridin'" | |
| SM Town Live Culture Humanity | SM Town | January 1, 2021 | Various (Note: Broadcast for free on platforms such as V Live, YouTube, Twitter, Facebook, and TikTok) | —N/a | | "Ridin'"; "Déjà Vu" | |
| SM Town Live 2022: SMCU Express at Kwangya | SM Town | January 1, 2022 | Various | —N/a | | "Hello Future"; "Hot Sauce" | |
| SM Town Live 2023: SMCU Palace at Kwangya | SM Town | January 1, 2023 | Various | —N/a | | "Beatbox" | |

== Fan meetings ==
List of fan meetings, with date(s), location, performed songs, and attedance
| Title | Date(s) | Venue | City | Country | Performed songs | Attendance | Ref. |
|---|---|---|---|---|---|---|---|
| NCT Dream Show | September 28–December 5, 2018 | SM Town Coex Artium | Seoul | South Korea | —N/a | —N/a | |
| The Sweet Dream Hotel | August 22–23, 2026 | Inspire Arena | Incheon | South Korea | "My First and Last"; "Drive"; "Beatbox"; "Best Friend"; "Don't Need Your Love"; "Candy"; "Chewing Gum"; "Beautiful Time" | 23,000 | |
