= NCT Dream discography =

List of albums and songs recorded by K-pop boy group NCT Dream

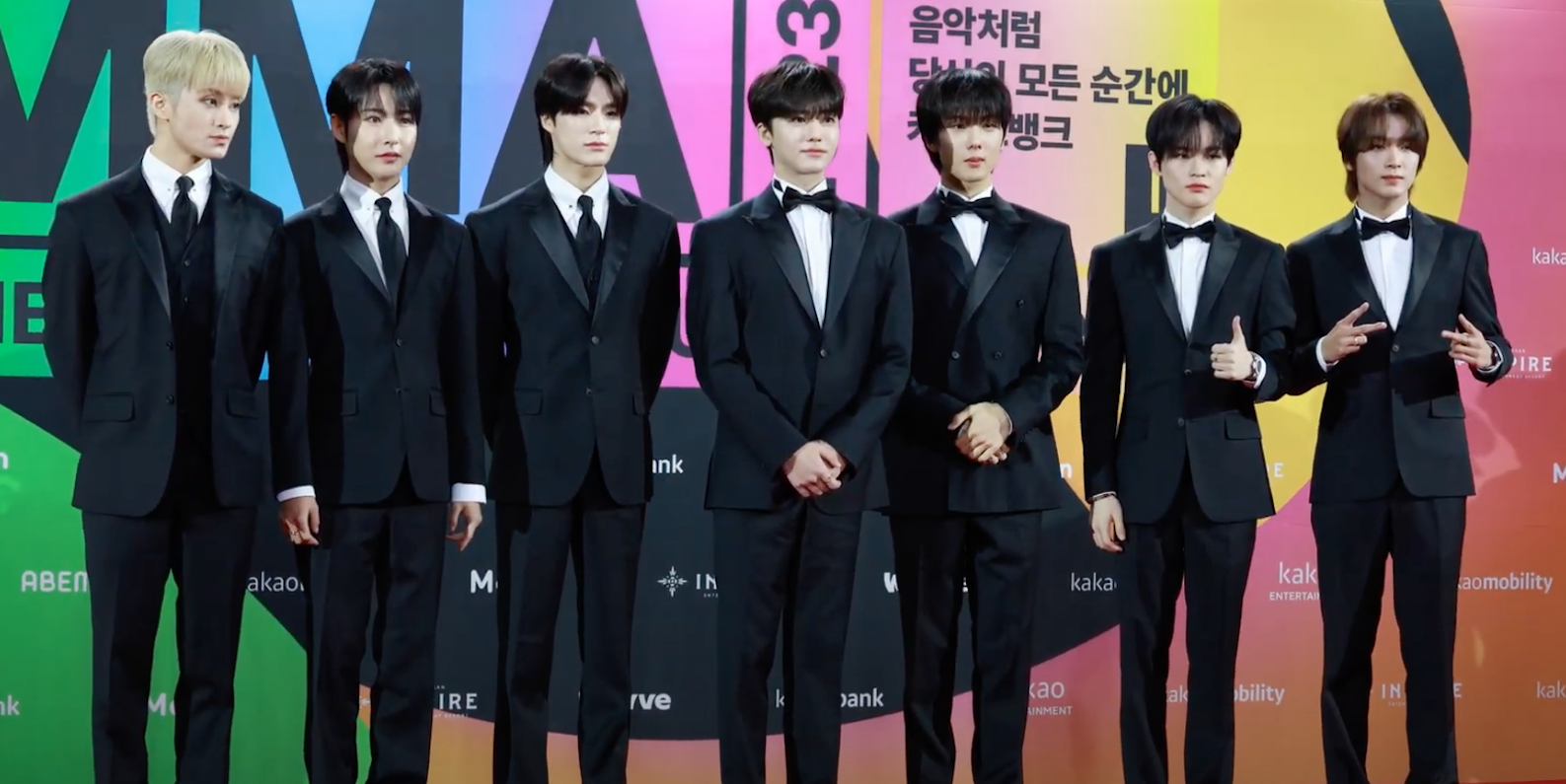
- NCT Dream in December 2023
- Studio albums: 6
- EPs: 8
- Live albums: 1
- Singles: 18
- Reissues: 2
- Single albums: 1

South Korean boy band NCT Dream have released six studio albums, two reissues, one live album, eight extended plays, one single albums, and twenty-three singles. A sub-unit of the boy band NCT, the group debuted in 2016 with the digital single "Chewing Gum", which was later featured on their first single album The First, released alongside its lead single "My First and Last" in 2017. Later that year, they released their first extended play, We Young, alongside its lead single of the same name. In 2018, they recorded the single "Go" for NCT's first studio album as a complete group, titled NCT 2018 Empathy. Their second extended play, We Go Up, was their first entry on the Oricon Albums Chart, charting at number 11. It was released in September 2018 alongside its lead single of the same name. The following year, they released their third extended play, We Boom. It spawned one single, "Boom". Their first Japanese-language extended play, The Dream, released in January 2020, was their first release to chart atop the Oricon Albums Chart. In April 2020, they released their fourth extended play, Reload. It spawned one single, "Ridin'".

Their first studio album, Hot Sauce, was released in May 2021 and was their first release to be certified 2× Million by the Korea Music Content Association (KMCA). Its lead single of the same name was their first song to chart atop the Gaon Digital Chart and became their first entry on the Billboard Global 200, charting at number 96. The reissue of the album, titled Hello Future, was released shortly afterwards alongside a second single and was certified Million by the KMCA. They released their second studio album, Glitch Mode, in March 2022, followed by its reissue, Beatbox, in May 2022. The album was their first entry on the Billboard 200, charting at number 50, and was certified 2× Million by the KMCA, while Beatbox was certified Million. It spawned two singles: "Glitch Mode" and "Beatbox". In December 2022, the group released their winter special EP, Candy, along with its lead single of the same name, originally released by H.O.T. In February 2023, NCT Dream released their first Japanese-language single, Best Friend Ever, which reached number three on the Billboard Japan Hot 100, becoming their highest ranking song on the chart to date. In July 2023, NCT Dream released their third studio album, ISTJ, which was supported by the singles "Broken Melodies" and "ISTJ". In March 2024, they released their fifth extended play, Dream()scape. It spawned one single, "Smoothie". In June 2024, NCT Dream released their second Japanese-language single, Moonlight, which reached number three on the Moonlight, becoming their highest ranking song on the chart to date. In November 2024, NCT Dream released their fourth studio album, Dreamscape, which was supported by the singles "Rains in Heaven", "Flying Kiss" and "When I'm with You". In July 2025, NCT Dream released their fifth studio album, Go Back to the Future, which was supported by the singles "BTTF" and "Chiller". In November 2025, they released their sixth extended play, Beat It up. It spawned one single, "Beat It up"

== Albums ==
=== Studio albums ===
List of studio albums, showing selected details, selected chart positions, sales figures, and certifications
Title	Details	Peak chart positions									Sales	Certifications
Title	Details	KOR	BEL (FL)	FIN	HUN	JPN	JPN Hot	UK Down.	US	US World	Sales	Certifications
Hot Sauce	Released: May 10, 2021; Label: SM Entertainment; Formats: CD, digital download, streaming	1	132	— (Note: Hot Sauce did not enter the Finnish Albums chart, but peaked at number 5 on the Finnish Physical Albums chart.)	9	1	2	72	—	10	KOR: 2,168,436; JPN: 120,586 (Phy.); JPN: 1,234 (Dig.)	KMCA: 2× Million
Glitch Mode	Released: March 28, 2022; Label: SM Entertainment; Formats: CD, digital download, streaming	1	64	18	19	2	2	—	50	2	KOR: 2,104,123; JPN: 140,919 (Phy.); US: 15,000	KMCA: 2× Million
ISTJ	Released: July 17, 2023; Label: SM Entertainment; Formats: CD, digital download, streaming	1	119	—	—	2	2	—	28	3	WW: 4,600,000; KOR: 4,279,203; JPN: 118,047 (Phy.); US: 45,500	RIAJ: Gold (Phy.); KMCA: 3× Million; KMCA: 2× Platinum (Nemo ver.); KMCA: Platinum (SMC ver.)
Dreamscape	Released: November 11, 2024; Label: SM Entertainment; Formats: CD, digital download, streaming	1	—	—	—	5	5	—	—	11	KOR: 1,596,025; JPN: 42,847	KMCA: Million
Go Back to the Future	Released: July 14, 2025; Label: SM Entertainment; Formats: CD, digital download, streaming	1	—	—	—	2	6	—	—	—	KOR: 1,001,900; JPN: 30,530 (Phy.)	KMCA: 3× Platinum
Dream After Dream	Released: November 9, 2026; Label: SM Entertainment; Formats: CD, digital download, streaming	2	—	—	—	30	22	—	—	—	KOR: 971,583; JPN: 1,741	
"—" denotes a recording that did not chart or was not released in that territory.

=== Reissues ===
List of reissues, showing selected details, selected chart positions, sales figures, and certifications
Title	Details	Peak chart positions						Sales	Certifications
Title	Details	KOR	BEL (FL)	HUN	POL	JPN Hot	US World	Sales	Certifications
Hello Future	Released: June 28, 2021; Label: SM Entertainment; Formats: CD, digital download, streaming	1	74	35	—	2	—	KOR: 1,382,802	KMCA: Million; KMCA: Platinum (Kit version)
Beatbox	Released: May 30, 2022; Label: SM Entertainment; Formats: CD, digital download, streaming	1	164	—	31	2	9	KOR: 1,522,181	KMCA: Million
"—" denotes a recording that did not chart or was not released in that territory.

=== Live albums ===
List of live albums
Title	Details
The Dream Show	Released: June 9, 2020; Label: SM Entertainment; Formats: CD, download, streaming

== Extended plays ==
List of extended plays, showing selected details, selected chart positions, sales figures, and certifications
Title	Details	Peak chart positions									Sales	Certifications
Title	Details	KOR	BEL (FL)	JPN	JPN Hot	HUN	POL	UK Down.	US Heat.	US World	Sales	Certifications
We Young	Released: August 17, 2017; Label: SM Entertainment; Formats: CD, digital download, streaming	2	—	—	91	—	—	—	—	3	KOR: 210,611	
We Go Up	Released: September 3, 2018; Label: SM Entertainment; Formats: CD, digital download, streaming	1	—	11	28	—	—	97	7	5	KOR: 381,609; JPN: 11,683 (Phy.); JPN: 735 (Dig.); US: 5,000	KMCA: Platinum
We Boom	Released: July 26, 2019; Label: SM Entertainment; Formats: CD, digital download, streaming	1	—	16	66	39	—	—	6	7	KOR: 640,612; JPN: 13,369; US: 1,000	KMCA: 2× Platinum
The Dream	Released: January 22, 2020 (JPN); Label: Avex Trax; Formats: CD, digital download, streaming	—	—	1	2	—	—	—	—	—	JPN: 61,514	
Reload	Released: April 29, 2020; Label: SM Entertainment; Formats: CD, digital download, streaming	1	—	2	11	39	29	—	—	7	KOR: 806,945; JPN: 15,887	KMCA: 2× Platinum
Candy	Released: December 19, 2022; Label: SM Entertainment; Formats: CD, digital download, streaming	1	112	2	2	—	—	—	—	—	KOR: 2,009,119; JPN: 79,297	KMCA: Million; KMCA: Platinum (SMC ver.)
Dream()scape	Released: March 25, 2024; Label: SM Entertainment; Formats: CD, digital download, streaming	1	147	2	2	—	—	—	—	4	KOR: 2,525,324; JPN: 34,602	KMCA: 2× Million
Beat It Up	Released: November 17, 2025; Label: SM Entertainment; Formats: CD, digital download, streaming	2	—	5	17	—	—	—	—	—	KOR: 1,019,987; JPN: 13,702	KMCA: 3× Platinum
"—" denotes a recording that did not chart or was not released in that territory.

== Single albums ==
List of single albums, showing selected details, selected chart positions, and sales figures
Title	Details	Peak chart positions	Sales
Title	Details	KOR	Sales
The First	Released: February 9, 2017; Label: SM Entertainment; Formats: CD, digital download, streaming	1	KOR: 280,718

== Singles ==
List of singles, showing year released, selected chart positions, sales figures, and name of the album
Title	Year	Peak chart positions										Sales (Note: Korean-language singles are downloads while Japanese-language singles are physical units, except noted.)	Album
Title	Year	KOR	KOR Songs (Note: Includes the Billboard K-pop Hot 100 (defunct as of 2022), and South Korea Songs (part of Billboard's Hits of the World (2022 onwards).)	HUN	IDN Songs	JPN	JPN Hot	NZ Hot	UK Sales	US World	WW	Sales	Album
"Chewing Gum"	2016	144	—	—	—	—	—	—	—	2	—	KOR: 19,196; US: 10,000	The First
"My First and Last" (마지막 첫사랑)	2017	89	—	—	—	—	—	—	—	11	—	KOR: 19,981	The First
"We Young"	2017	— (Note: "We Young" did not enter the Gaon Digital Chart, but peaked at number 91 on the Gaon Download Chart.)	—	—	—	—	—	—	—	11	—	KOR: 17,349	We Young
"Go"	2018	— (Note: "Go" did not enter the Gaon Digital Chart, but peaked at number 69 on the Gaon Download Chart.)	25	—	—	—	—	—	—	18	—	—N/a	NCT 2018 Empathy
"We Go Up"	2018	73	7	—	—	—	—	—	—	11	—	US: 1,000	We Go Up
"Boom"	2019	90	6	—	—	—	—	40	—	6	—	US: 1,000	We Boom
"Ridin'"	2020	17	26	—	—	—	—	—	—	18	—	—N/a	Reload
"Hot Sauce"	2021	1	18	—	—	—	44	—	—	8	96	—N/a	Hot Sauce
"Hello Future"	2021	6	50	—	—	—	89	—	—	17	—	—N/a	Hello Future
"Glitch Mode"	2022	2	52	—	15	—	35	—	—	—	—	—N/a	Glitch Mode
"Beatbox"	2022	1	12	—	8	—	55	—	—	9	—	—N/a	Beatbox
"Candy"	2022	3	5	—	10	—	63	40	—	—	198	—N/a	Candy
"Best Friend Ever"	2023	—	—	—	—	1	3	—	—	—	—	JPN: 228,724	Non-album single
"Broken Melodies"	2023	28	14	28	16	—	83	—	13	8	179	—N/a	ISTJ
"ISTJ"	2023	2	5	—	—	—	51	—	—	—	125	—N/a	ISTJ
"Smoothie"	2024	3	17	—	—	—	57	—	18	—	—	—N/a	Dream()scape
"Moonlight"	2024	—	—	—	—	2	2	—	—	—	—	JPN: 152,091	Moonlight
"Rains in Heaven"	2024	155	—	—	—	—	—	28	14	—	—	—N/a	Dreamscape
"Flying Kiss"	2024	— (Note: "Flying Kiss" did not enter the Circle Digital Chart, but peaked and debuted at number 44 on the Download Chart.)	—	—	—	—	—	—	—	—	—	—N/a	Dreamscape
"When I'm with You"	2024	8	—	—	—	—	—	—	4	—	—	—N/a	Dreamscape
"BTTF"	2025	10	—	—	—	—	—	—	5	—	—	—N/a	Go Back to the Future
"Chiller"	2025	19	—	—	—	—	—	—	—	—	—	—N/a	Go Back to the Future
"Beat It Up"	2025	9	—	—	—	—	—	—	—	—	—	—N/a	Beat It Up
"Boogie Woogie"	2026	5	—	—	—	—	—	—	—	—	—	—N/a	Dream After Dream
"—" denotes a recording that did not chart or was not released in that territory.

== Promotional singles ==
List of promotional singles
Title	Year	Peak chart positions	Album	Notes
Title	Year	KOR	Album	Notes
"Trigger the Fever"	2017	—	We Young	Official song for the 2017 FIFA U-20 World Cup
"Joy"	2017	153	S.M. Station Season 2	SM Station single
"Candle Light" (사랑한단 뜻이야)	2018	—	S.M. Station Season 3	SM Station single
"Fireflies"	2019	—	Non-album single	Official theme song for The World Scout Foundation
"—" denotes a recording that did not chart or was not released in that territory.

== Collaborations ==
List of collaborations, showing year released, selected chart positions, and name of the album
Title	Year	Peak chart positions	Album
Title	Year	US World	Album
"Hair in the Air" (with Yeri)	2018	—	SM Station Season 3
"Don't Need Your Love" (with HRVY)	2019	4	SM Station Season 3
"—" denotes a recording that did not chart or was not released in that territory.

=== As featured artist ===
List of singles as featured artist
Title	Year	Album
"Up to You" (PrettyMuch featuring NCT Dream)	2019	INT'L EP

== Other charted songs ==
List of other charted songs, showing year released, selected chart positions, and name of the album
Title	Year	Peak chart positions			Album
Title	Year	KOR	KOR Songs	US World	Album
"Fireflies"	2020	—	—	11	The World Scout Organization OST
"Quiet Down"	2020	131	56	—	Reload
"7 Days" (내게 말해줘)	2020	97	49	—	Reload
"Love Again" (사랑은 또다시)	2020	117	50	—	Reload
"Puzzle Piece" (너의 자리)	2020	115	55	—	Reload
"Déjà Vu"	2020	123	—	—	NCT 2020 Resonance Pt. 1
"Diggity"	2021	107	—	—	Hot Sauce
"Dive Into You"	2021	76	—	—	Hot Sauce
"My Youth"	2021	88	—	—	Hot Sauce
"Rocket"	2021	108	—	—	Hot Sauce
"Countdown (3,2,1)"	2021	114	—	—	Hot Sauce
"ANL"	2021	110	—	—	Hot Sauce
"Irreplaceable"	2021	100	—	—	Hot Sauce
"Be There for You"	2021	112	—	—	Hot Sauce
"Rainbow"	2021	123	—	—	Hot Sauce
"Bungee"	2021	119	—	—	Hello Future
"Life Is Still Going On" (오르골)	2021	105	—	—	Hello Future
"Fire Alarm"	2022	112	—	—	Glitch Mode
"Arcade"	2022	96	—	—	Glitch Mode
"It's Yours" (너를 위한 단어)	2022	95	—	—	Glitch Mode
"Teddy Bear" (잘 자)	2022	107	—	—	Glitch Mode
"Replay" (내일 봐)	2022	122	—	—	Glitch Mode
"Saturday Drip"	2022	118	—	—	Glitch Mode
"Better Than Gold" (지금)	2022	120	—	—	Glitch Mode
"Drive" (미니카)	2022	106	—	—	Glitch Mode
"Never Goodbye" (북극성)	2022	79	—	—	Glitch Mode
"Rewind"	2022	109	—	—	Glitch Mode
"To My First" (마지막 인사)	2022	103	—	—	Beatbox
"Sorry, Heart"	2022	137	—	—	Beatbox
"On the Way" (별 밤)	2022	166	—	—	Beatbox
"Graduation"	2022	54	—	—	Candy
"Tangerine Love (Favorite)"	2022	73	—	—	Candy
"Take My Breath" (입김)	2022	92	—	—	Candy
"Moon" (문)	2022	87	—	—	Candy
"Walk with You" (발자국)	2022	83	—	—	Candy
"Yogurt Shake"	2023	84	—	—	ISTJ
"Skateboard"	2023	135	—	—	ISTJ
"Blue Wave" (파랑)	2023	97	19	—	ISTJ
"Poison" (모래성)	2023	123	—	—	ISTJ
"SOS"	2023	139	—	—	ISTJ
"Pretzel (♡)"	2023	145	—	—	ISTJ
"Starry Night" (제자리 걸음)	2023	148	—	—	ISTJ
"Like We Just Met"	2023	114	18	—	ISTJ
"Icantfeelanything"	2024	126	—	—	Dream()Scape
"Box"	2024	118	—	—	Dream()Scape
"Carat Cake"	2024	141	—	—	Dream()Scape
"Unknown"	2024	104	—	—	Dream()Scape
"Breathing" (숨)	2024	133	—	—	Dream()Scape
"Love Me Right"	2025	— (Note: "Love Me Right" did not enter the Circle Digital Chart; it peaked at number 121 on the component Download Chart.)	—	—	2025 SM Town: The Culture, the Future
"I Like It"	2025	196	—	—	Go Back to the Future
"'Bout You" (나의 소나기)	2025	194	—	—	Go Back to the Future
"—" denotes a recording that did not chart or was not released in that territory.
