= We Go Up =

We Go Up may refer to:

- We Go Up (NCT Dream EP), the 2018 EP
  - "We Go Up" (NCT Dream song), the EP's title track
- "We Go Up" (Nicki Minaj song), the 2022 single featuring Fivio Foreign
- We Go Up (Babymonster EP), the 2025 EP, or its title track

== See also ==
- We're Goin' Up, the 1968 album by saxophonist Eric Kloss
- We're Movin' Up, the 1989 album by American band Atlantic Starr
