= ISTJ =

ISTJ can refer to:

- One of 16 Myers–Briggs Type Indicators
- A personality type in Socionics
- ISTJ (album), a 2023 studio album by NCT Dream
