= Jeno (singer) =

South Korean singer and actor (born 2000)

- Jeno in 2025
- Born: Lee Je-no; April 23, 2000 (age 26); Incheon, South Korea
- Occupations: Singer; rapper; actor
- Years active: 2005–present
- Musical career
- Genre: K-pop
- Instrument: Vocals
- Label: SM
- Member of: NCT; NCT Dream; NCT JNJM
- Formerly of: SM Rookies

Korean name
- Hangul: 이제노
- RR: I Jeno
- MR: I Cheno

Lee Je-no (Korean: 이제노; born April 23, 2000), known mononymously as Jeno, is a South Korean singer, rapper, and actor. He rose to prominence as a member of the K-pop boy band NCT and its sub-units NCT Dream and NCT JNJM.

Born in Incheon and raised in Goyang, Jeno began his career as a child model and actor. In 2013, he started training under SM Entertainment and joined the label's official team of trainees, SM Rookies, appearing on television and touring both in South Korea and abroad. He made his debut in 2016 with NCT, which went on to achieve commercial success and become an influential K-pop act. Beyond his music career, Jeno hosted the music program The Show from 2018 to 2019 and took on his first leading role in 2026, starring in the coming-of-age web series Wind Up.

== Life and career ==
=== 2000–2013: Early life and career beginnings ===
Lee Je-no was born on April 23, 2000, in Incheon, South Korea, and grew up in Ilsan, Goyang. He began his career as a child model at five years old, featuring in magazines for children's clothing, before transitioning to television commercials for milk, phones, snacks, and insurance. In 2006, he appeared in Lee Cheol-ha's romance film Love Me Not. His early work led to his discovery by a casting director from SM Entertainment, who later contacted him with a casting offer. Although his mother was initially reluctant, she ultimately allowed him to join the label as a trainee in 2013. At SM, trainees could receive lessons in singing, musical instruments, acting, modeling, beatboxing, public speaking, foreign languages, and dance styles such as ballet and jazz, depending on their interests and strengths. Meanwhile, Jeno went on to study in the Practical Dance department of the School of Performing Arts Seoul.

=== 2013–2024: SM Rookies and NCT ===
SM publicly introduced Jeno as a member of its official training team, SM Rookies, on December 3, 2013, via its social media accounts alongside his fellow trainees Seulgi and Taeyong. The agency's first program of its kind, SM Rookies allowed trainees to gain experience and public exposure before their debut, often grouping them by gender and concept into distinct units. As part of the team, Jeno appeared in the 2014 variety show Exo 90:2014 with the boy band Exo and the 2015 South Korean revival of The Mickey Mouse Club (1995–1996) with Super Junior's Leeteuk, performing songs, dances, and comedy skits. He also participated in the concert tours SM Town Live World Tour IV (2014–2015), featuring several SM artists coming together to perform under the musical collective SM Town, and SM Rookies Show (2015–2016), held in South Korea and Thailand, in which the team covered songs by SM artists.

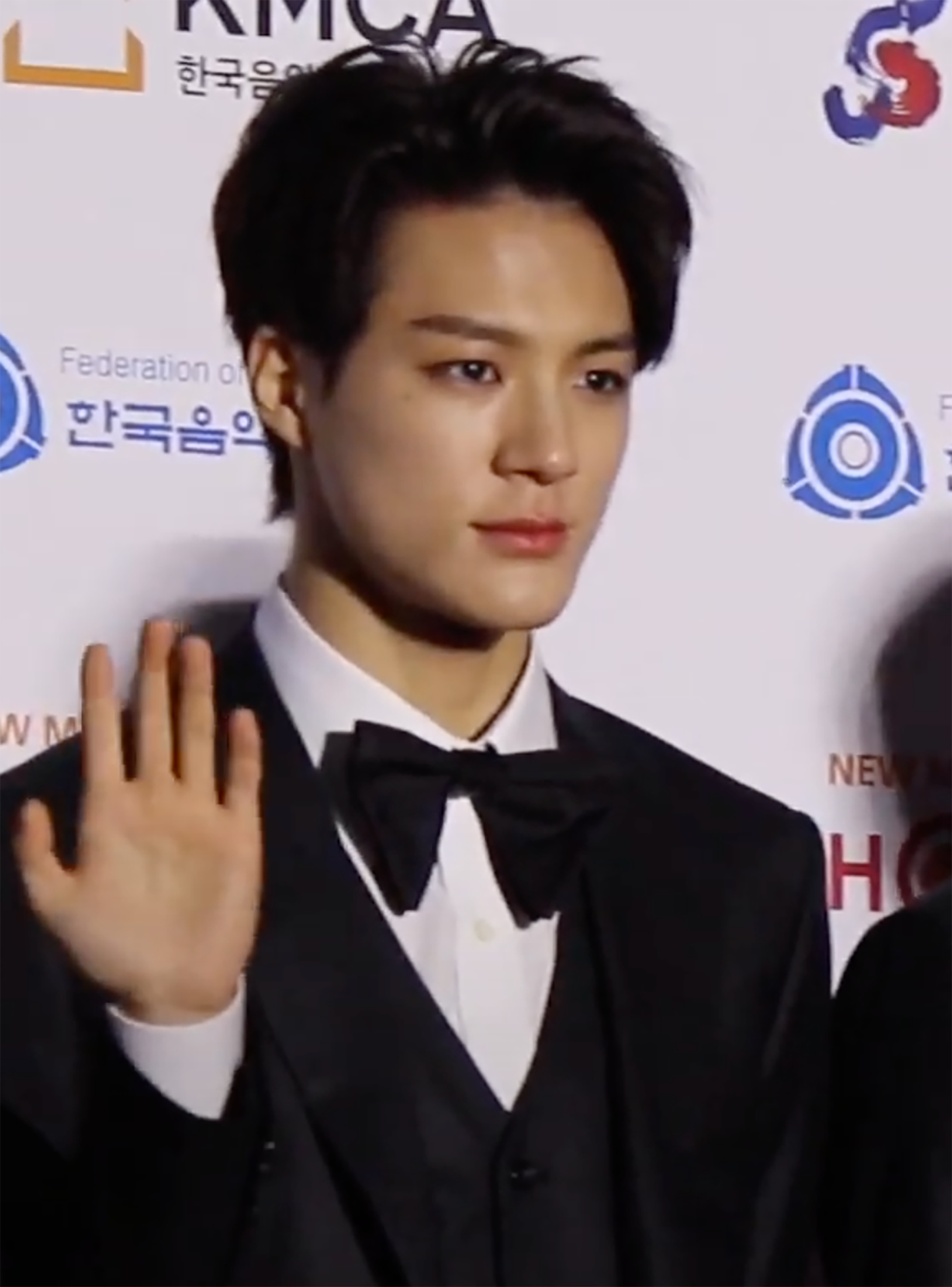
Jeno at the Gaon Chart Music Awards in January 2020

In August 2016, SM announced that Jeno would join NCT, a boy band designed with a concept of unlimited members where smaller sub-units would debut independently and occasionally collaborate under the sub-unit NCT U. He debuted on August 25 with NCT's third sub-unit, NCT Dream, performing their first single, "Chewing Gum", on the television music program M Countdown. Initially established as NCT's teen unit, all members debuted as minors under a graduation system where they would leave the group upon reaching adulthood; however, the graduation concept was scrapped in 2020. Music critics described NCT Dream as the unit with the most compelling narrative, remarking on how their transition from teen pop to a blend of hip-hop and R&B music reflected the members' artistic growth from adolescence to adulthood. Jeno contributed to the band's first full-group album, NCT 2018 Empathy (2018), and made his first appearance under NCT U with the track "Misfit", released in October 2020. Grammy.com stated that NCT became one of the most influential K-pop acts; in particular, NCT Dream achieved commercial success, recording ten consecutive million-seller albums.

In May 2018, Jeno began hosting the music program The Show alongside Yeeun and Jin Longguo, later stepping down in November 2019. In September 2018, Jeno and his bandmate Jaemin made a cameo appearance on the web romance series A-Teen. In October 2021, he featured on Donghae's hip hop and R&B single "California Love". Later that December, Jeno and his labelmates Taeyong, Hendery, Yangyang, and Giselle released the track "Zoo" from SM Town's studio album 2021 Winter SM Town: SMCU Express. They performed the song at the SM Town Live 2022: SMCU Express, SM Town Live 2023: SMCU Palace, and SM Town Live 2025: The Culture, the Future tours. In August 2022, he featured on Key's track "Villain" from his second studio album, Gasoline.

=== 2025–present: Acting and NCT JNJM ===
In January 2026, Jeno and Jaemin starred as Woo-jin and Tae-hee in the coming-of-age short-form drama Wind Up, released on the mobile app Kitz. Jeno played a baseball player unable to throw strikes due to past trauma, who receives an offer to be managed by Jaemin's character. Wind Up recorded approximately 30 million views across the app and other social media platforms, leading to the exclusive release of an edited theatrical cut in CGV theathers in July. The series was also selected to be screened at the 30th Bucheon International Fantastic Film Festival. In January, SM also announced that Jeno and Jaemin would form a new sub-unit, NCT JNJM, citing the strong synergy they had shown since they were trainees. The duo released their first extended play (EP), Both Sides, on February 23 to commercial success. Later that August, ten years after his debut, it was announced that Jeno had renewed his exclusive contract with SM.

== Other ventures ==
=== Fashion and endorsements ===
In September 2022, Jeno became the first K-pop artist to open a runway show at the New York Fashion Week, wearing the first look for Peter Do's show. After he attended Ferragamo's fashion show at the Milan Fashion Week in February 2023, Jeno was appointed by the fashion house as its first global male brand ambassador the following May. In February 2025, he became the global brand ambassador for the South Korean cosmetics brand A'pieu. The company reported that search volume across social media and other platforms increased by 357% compared to the same period the previous year after the release of Jeno's first pictorial. In March 2026, the South Korean fashion brand Matin Kim appointed him as its first male brand ambassador for that year's summer season. Following the launch of his first campaign with the brand, sales reportedly increased by 150% compared to the same period the previous year.

=== Philanthropy ===
In May 2019, Jeno and Jaemin volunteered with children living in an Indonesian slum through the non-governmental organization Good Neighbors; their activities were featured in an MBC TV documentary. In June 2020, Jeno and his bandmate Jisung became ambassadors of an awareness campaign organized by Maeil Business Newspaper to prevent illegal filming and digital sex crimes. In March 2025, Jeno donated ₩100 million to the Community Chest of Korea to aid recovery efforts for the wildfires that broke out that month.

== Discography ==
=== Singles ===
List of singles as featured artist, with year of release, selected chart positions, and associated album
Title	Year	Peak chart positions	Album
Title	Year	KOR	Album
"California Love" (Donghae featuring Jeno)	2021	179	Non-album single

=== Other charted songs ===
List of other charted songs, with year of release, selected chart positions, and associated album
Title	Year	Peak chart positions			Album
Title	Year	KOR DL	NZ Hot	SGP Reg.	Album
"Zoo" (with Taeyong, Hendery, Yangyang, and Giselle)	2021	130	38	15	2021 Winter SM Town: SMCU Express
"Villain" (Key featuring Jeno)	2022	39	—	—	Gasoline
"Hot & Cold" (with Kai, Seulgi, and Karina)	2022	47	—	—	2022 Winter SM Town: SMCU Palace
"—" denotes a recording that did not chart or was not released in that territory.

=== Writing credits ===
Key
Indicates songs in which writers are credited specifically for the Korean lyrics

List of songs by name, with credited artist(s), lyricist(s), composer(s), associated album, and year of release
Title	Artist(s)	Lyricist(s)	Composer(s)	Album	Year	Ref.
"119"	NCT Dream	Baek Geum-min; Lee Soo-jung; Jeno; Jaemin	Jonatan Gusmark; Ludvig Evers; Cazzi Opeia; Ellen Berg Tollbom	We Boom	2019	
"Beautiful"	NCT 2021	Yoo Young-jin; Taeyong; Mark; Johnny; Jeno; Hendery	Yoo Han-jin; Yoo Young-jin	Universe	2021	
"Best Friend"	NCT Dream	Le'mon; Jeno; Jaemin; Jisung	Jamil "Digi" Chammas; Anthony Russo; MZMC	We Boom	2019	
"Breathing" (숨)	NCT Dream	Woo Seung-yeon; Mark; Jeno; Jaemin; Jisung	Micky Blue; Realmeee; Patrick Liney; Cosmo Liney; Etham Basden; Mark; Jeno; Jaemin; Jisung	Dream()scape	2024	
"Bye My First..." (사랑이 좀 어려워)	NCT Dream	Ryu Da-som; Kim Eun-joo; Jeno; Jaemin; Jisung	Benjamin Ingrosso; Livvi Franc; Louis Schoorl	We Boom	2019	
"Dear Dream"	NCT Dream	Baek Geum-min; Lee Soo-jung; Jisung; Jaemin; Jeno; Mark	Anton Ewald; Simon Johansson; Sebastian Thott	We Go Up	2018	
"Dream Run"	NCT Dream	Kyung Jin-hee; Jang Jung-won; Jeno	Jamil "Digi" Chammas; Anthony Russo; MZMC; David Fremberg; Andreas Stone Johansson	We Boom	2019	
"It's Yours" (너를 위한 단어)	NCT Dream	Lee Jae-ni; Mark; Jeno; Jaemin; Jisung	High Squad	Glitch Mode	2022	
"Like We Just Met"	NCT Dream	Mark; Renjun; Jeno; Haechan; Jaemin; Chenle; Jisung	Allegro; Dan Johnson; Robbie Jay; Mark; Jeno; Jaemin	ISTJ	2023	
"Never Goodbye" (북극성)	NCT Dream	Hwang Yu-bin; Mark; Jeno; Jaemin; Jisung	Zayson; Kim Ji-hoo	Glitch Mode	2022	
"Puzzle Piece" (너의 자리)	NCT Dream	Hwang Yu-bin; Jeno; Jaemin	Josh Cumbee; Andrew Allen	Reload	2020	
"Rainbow" (책갈피)	NCT Dream	Jo Yoon-kyung; Mark; Jeno; Jaemin; Jisung	Jurek Reunamäki; Rik Annema; Cimo Fränkel; Annie Schindel; Griff Clawson	Hot Sauce	2021	
"Replay" (내일봐)	NCT Dream	Hwang Yu-bin; Mark; Jeno; Jisung	Ludwig Lindell; Gregory G. Curtis II	Glitch Mode	2022	
"Unknown"	NCT Dream	Lee Seu-ran; Mark; Jeno	Nicklas Jarelius Persson; William Segerdahl; Ninos Hanna; Mark; Jeno	Dream()scape	2024	
"Zoo"	Jeno, Taeyong, Hendery, Yangyang, and Giselle	Rick Bridges; Taeyong; Jeno; Giselle	Keelah Jacobsen; Cameron Joseph Rugg; Ryan Jhun	2021 Winter SM Town: SMCU Express	2021	

== Filmography ==
=== Film ===
Year	Title	Role	Notes	Ref.
2006	Love Me Not	Young Jin		
2026	Wind Up: The Movie (와인드업: 더 무비)	Woo-jin	Theatrical version of Wind Up	

=== Television ===
Year	Title	Role	Ref.
2018–2019	The Show	Host	

=== Web ===
Year	Title	Role	Notes	Ref.
2018	A-Teen	Himself	Episode 20	
2026	Wind Up	Woo-jin	Short-form drama	

== Accolades ==
=== Listicles ===
List of listicle placements, with name of the publisher, year of listing, name of the listicle, and placement
Publisher	Year	Listicle	Placement	Ref.
Billboard	2024	K-Pop Artist 100	87th	
Billboard	2025	K-Pop Artist 100	77th	
