= Jaemin =

South Korean singer and actor (born 2000)

- Jaemin in 2025
- Born: Na Jae-min; August 13, 2000 (age 26); Busan, South Korea
- Occupations: Singer; rapper; actor
- Years active: 2014–present
- Musical career
- Genre: K-pop
- Instrument: Vocals
- Label: SM
- Member of: NCT; NCT Dream; NCT JNJM
- Formerly of: SM Rookies

Korean name
- Hangul: 나재민
- RR: Na Jaemin
- MR: Na Chaemin

Na Jae-min (Korean: 나재민; born August 13, 2000), known mononymously as Jaemin, is a South Korean singer, rapper, and actor. He rose to prominence as a member of the K-pop boy band NCT and its sub-units NCT Dream and NCT JNJM.

Born in Busan and raised in Jeonju and Seoul, Jaemin started training under SM Entertainment in 2013. He began his career in 2014, appearing on television and touring both in South Korea and abroad with the label's official team of trainees, SM Rookies. He made his debut in 2016 with NCT, which went on to achieve commercial success and become an influential K-pop act. Beyond his music career, Jaemin has appeared on variety shows and took on his first leading role in 2019, starring in the television college romance series The Way I Hate You. He has also ventured into photography, holding his first exhibition in 2024.

== Life and career ==
=== 2000–2013: Early life and career beginnings ===
Na Jae-min was born on August 13, 2000, in Busan, South Korea, and grew up in Jeonju and Seoul. His mother was a high school physical education teacher. Jaemin competed nationally in short-track speed skating, finishing in second place at the National Youth Short Track Speed Skating Championship. He was street-cast by SM Entertainment while volunteering for school, subsequently joining the agency as a trainee in 2013 after passing his audition. At SM, trainees could receive lessons in singing, musical instruments, acting, modeling, beatboxing, public speaking, foreign languages, and dance styles such as ballet and jazz, depending on their interests and strengths. Meanwhile, he went on to study at the School of Performing Arts Seoul.

=== 2014–2024: SM Rookies, NCT, and television work ===
Jaemin made his first television appearance on the 2014 variety show Exo 90:2014 with the boy band Exo and members of the label's training team, SM Rookies. SM officially introduced him as a member of SM Rookies by June 2015. The agency's first program of its kind, SM Rookies allowed trainees to gain experience and public exposure before their debut, often grouping them by gender and concept into distinct units. As part of the team, Jaemin appeared in the 2015 South Korean revival of The Mickey Mouse Club (1995–1996) with Super Junior's Leeteuk, performing songs, dances, and comedy skits. He also participated in the concert tours SM Town Live World Tour IV (2014–2015), featuring several SM artists coming together to perform under the musical collective SM Town, and SM Rookies Show (2015–2016), held in South Korea and Thailand, in which the team covered songs by SM artists.

Jaemin at the 24th Dream Concert in May 2018

In August 2016, SM announced that Jaemin would join NCT, a boy band designed with a concept of unlimited members where smaller sub-units would debut independently and occasionally collaborate under the sub-unit NCT U. He debuted on August 25 with NCT's third sub-unit, NCT Dream, performing their first single, "Chewing Gum", on the television music program M Countdown. Initially established as NCT's teen unit, all members debuted as minors under a graduation system where they would leave the group upon reaching adulthood; however, the graduation concept was scrapped in 2020. Music critics described NCT Dream as the unit with the most compelling narrative, remarking on how their transition from teen pop to a blend of hip-hop and R&B music reflected the members' artistic growth from adolescence to adulthood. Grammy.com stated that NCT became one of the most influential K-pop acts; in particular, NCT Dream achieved commercial success, recording ten consecutive million-seller albums.

After stepping back from group activities in late 2016, SM officially announced in February 2017 that Jaemin would take a hiatus to recover from a herniated disc, leading to his absence from NCT Dream's 2017 releases. He returned to the group by March 2018, participating in promotional activities for NCT's first full-group studio album, NCT 2018 Empathy. Later that September, Jaemin and his bandmate Jeno made a cameo appearance on the web romance series A-Teen. In December, he joined the second season of the tvN variety show My English Puberty 100 Hours, studying English intensively for about 100 hours over two weeks before traveling abroad to test his skills.

In April 2019, Jaemin starred opposite Kim Ji-in in the JTBC4 short college romance series The Way I Hate You, based on the webtoon of the same name. Also released on the web, the series later earned him the Seoul Webfest Award for Best Actor (Korean). In May, he appeared on the Channel A variety show Shall We Play Together? GG, where a gaming team of celebrities was formed to compete in matches against students across the country. In October 2020, Jaemin made his first appearance under NCT U with the single "Make a Wish (Birthday Song)".

=== 2025–present: Acting and NCT JNJM ===
In March 2025, Jaemin began hosting the radio show NCT Dream Jaemin's Rabbit and Cat Radio every Thursday on the Japanese station InterFM. Initially scheduled for a limited three-month run, the broadcast was extended indefinitely. Later that December, he hosted the SBS music festival SBS Gayo Daejeon alongside An Yu-jin and Young K. In January 2026, he and Jeno starred as Tae-hee and Woo-jin in the coming-of-age short-form drama Wind Up, released on the mobile app Kitz. Jaemin played a transfer student who volunteers to manage Jeno's character, a baseball player unable to throw strikes due to past trauma. Wind Up recorded approximately 30 million views across the app and other social media platforms, leading to the exclusive release of an edited theatrical cut in CGV theaters in July. The series was also selected to be screened at the 30th Bucheon International Fantastic Film Festival. Jaemin later won the Asian Star Award – South Korea (Actor) at the 21st Seoul International Drama Awards.

In January, SM also announced that he and Jeno would form a new sub-unit, NCT JNJM, citing the strong synergy they had shown since they were trainees. The duo released their first extended play (EP), Both Sides, on February 23 to commercial success. Later that August, ten years after his debut, it was announced that Jaemin had renewed his exclusive contract with SM. In October, he starred in the talk show Idol's Table (아이돌스 테이블), which follows a multicultural cast of idols as they discuss their food preferences and diverse recipes.

== Other ventures ==
=== Photography ===
Jaemin first developed an interest in photography in 2015, initially focusing on video making. He seriously took up photography in 2018 to show behind-the-scenes moments to fans, leading him to invest in professional cameras and editing equipment by 2019 so that he could share portraits of the members. He alternates between six different cameras—the Sony A9, the Leica Q2, Q3, M6, and M11, and Kodak disposable cameras—and prefers prime lenses to achieve blurred backgrounds. Although he originally wanted to hold his first exhibition in 2021, he abandoned the plan due to the COVID-19 pandemic, prompting him to share photography-focused content on YouTube instead.

In June 2024, Jaemin announced his first photography exhibition, Narcissism, set to be held in Seoul from June 29 to July 19, He curated the design of the exhibition and its merchandise, and recorded an audio guide in four languages. Showcasing a collection of photographs taken since 2018, the exhibition aimed to capture Jaemin's journey of self-love, starting from within his own identity and expanding out into the world to encompass NCT Dream and the fans. The first floor featured works capturing Jaemin himself, opening with a mirror piece that TV Daily's Choi Ha-na highlighted as a key metaphor for narcissism. The second floor showcased photographs of his bandmates alongside landscapes taken while touring, accompanied by a replica of Jaemin's studio and an interactive area with magnifying glasses. The exhibition also featured themed works by contemporary artists.

Organized with Musinsa, the platform released entry tickets on June 21 and July 4, and sold merchandise that included a photobook. Sports Seoul reported that the initial tickets sold out in under two minutes. Choi and the Hankook Ilbo's Hong Hye-min wrote positive reviews, respectively praising the emotional resonance of the photographs and the exhibition's layout. Due to fan demand, the exhibition was extended to July 31; furthermore, it was announced on June 30 that three landscapes and eight portraits would be sold exclusively to members of the group's official Weverse fan club, with all proceeds set to be donated.

=== Endorsements ===
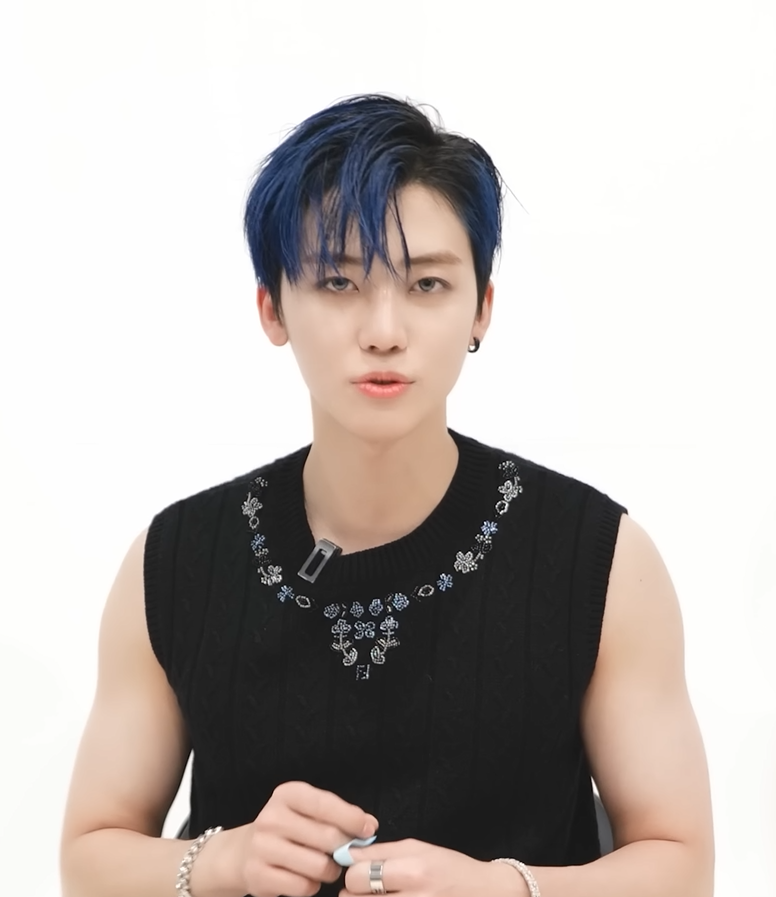
Jaemin for Marie Claire Korea in January 2023

Jaemin became the brand ambassador for the Chinese snack brand Snack Paper in June 2024 and the South Korean skin care brand Isntree in June 2025. He was named the Asia-Pacific brand ambassador for the American jeans brand Lee in January 2026. Jaemin has also appeared on the cover of fashion magazines wearing Tom Ford, Fendi, Zegna, and Barrie.

=== Philanthropy ===
In November 2018, Jaemin traveled to Vietnam with the UNICEF Korea Special Representative, Choi Si-won, to meet with students and film a video advocating against school violence on the occasion of World Children's Day. In March 2019, Jaemin acted as a youth representative at an event organized by the Korean Committee for UNICEF, meeting with its chairman, Song Sang-hyun, and Queen Mathilde of Belgium. Later that May, Jaemin and Jeno volunteered with children living in an Indonesian slum through the non-governmental organization Good Neighbors; their activities were featured in an MBC TV documentary.

In October 2021, Jaemin joined a campaign organized by the Korea Dairy Industries Association and the Korean Red Cross by donating a personal item for a charity lottery. In December 2024, Jaemin donated ₩100 million to UNICEF on behalf of NCT Dream's fan club, using the proceeds from his photography sales. In March 2025, Jaemin donated ₩150 million to the Community Chest of Korea to aid recovery efforts for the wildfires that broke out that month.

== Discography ==
=== Charted songs ===
List of charted songs, with year of release, selected chart positions, and associated album
Title	Year	Peak chart positions	Album
Title	Year	KOR DL	Album
"Jet" (with Eunhyuk, Hyoyeon, Taeyong, Sungchan, Giselle, and Winter)	2022	108	2022 Winter SM Town: SMCU Palace

=== Writing credits ===
Key
Indicates songs in which writers are credited specifically for the Korean lyrics

List of songs by name, with credited artist(s), lyricist(s), composer(s), associated album, and year of release
Title	Artist(s)	Lyricist(s)	Composer(s)	Album	Year	Ref.
"119"	NCT Dream	Baek Geum-min; Lee Soo-jung; Jeno; Jaemin	Jonatan Gusmark; Ludvig Evers; Cazzi Opeia; Ellen Berg Tollbom	We Boom	2019	
"Best Friend"	NCT Dream	Le'mon; Jeno; Jaemin; Jisung	Jamil "Digi" Chammas; Anthony Russo; MZMC	We Boom	2019	
"Boogie Woogie"	NCT Dream	Joowon; Jaemin	Deeno; Yejune Synn; Dochi; Kuzzi	Dream After Dream	2026	
"Breathing" (숨)	NCT Dream	Woo Seung-yeon; Mark; Jeno; Jaemin; Jisung	Micky Blue; Realmeee; Patrick Liney; Cosmo Liney; Etham Basden; Mark; Jeno; Jaemin; Jisung	Dream()scape	2024	
"Bye My First..." (사랑이 좀 어려워)	NCT Dream	Ryu Da-som; Kim Eun-joo; Jeno; Jaemin; Jisung	Benjamin Ingrosso; Livvi Franc; Louis Schoorl	We Boom	2019	
"Dear Dream"	NCT Dream	Baek Geum-min; Lee Soo-jung; Jisung; Jaemin; Jeno; Mark	Anton Ewald; Simon Johansson; Sebastian Thott	We Go Up	2018	
"It's Yours" (너를 위한 단어)	NCT Dream	Lee Jae-ni; Mark; Jeno; Jaemin; Jisung	High Squad	Glitch Mode	2022	
"Like We Just Met"	NCT Dream	Mark; Renjun; Jeno; Haechan; Jaemin; Chenle; Jisung	Allegro; Dan Johnson; Robbie Jay; Mark; Jeno; Jaemin	ISTJ	2023	
"Never Goodbye" (북극성)	NCT Dream	Hwang Yu-bin; Mark; Jeno; Jaemin; Jisung	Zayson; Kim Ji-hoo	Glitch Mode	2022	
"Puzzle Piece" (너의 자리)	NCT Dream	Hwang Yu-bin; Jeno; Jaemin	Josh Cumbee; Andrew Allen	Reload	2020	
"Rainbow" (책갈피)	NCT Dream	Jo Yoon-kyung; Mark; Jeno; Jaemin; Jisung	Jurek Reunamäki; Rik Annema; Cimo Fränkel; Annie Schindel; Griff Clawson	Hot Sauce	2021	
"What It Is"	NCT JNJM	Jaemin	Cyrus Villanueva; Tim Tan; Aaron Theodore Berton; Matthew Crawford; Hautboi Rich; Qrated Songs	Both Sides	2026	

== Filmography ==
=== Film ===
Year	Title	Role	Notes	Ref.
2026	Wind Up: The Movie (와인드업: 더 무비)	Tae-hee	Theatrical version of Wind Up	

=== Television ===
Year	Title	Role	Notes	Ref.
2018–2019	My English Puberty 100 Hours	Cast member	Season 2	
2019	The Way I Hate You (너를 싫어하는 방법)	Han Dae-gang		
2019	Shall We Play Together? GG	Cast member		
2025	SBS Gayo Daejeon	Host	Year-end edition	
2026	Idol's Table (아이돌스 테이블)	Panelist		

=== Web ===
Year	Title	Role	Notes	Ref.
2018	A-Teen	Himself	Episode 20	
2026	Wind Up	Tae-hee	Short-form drama	

=== Radio ===
Year	Title	Role	Ref.
2025–present	NCT Dream Jaemin's Rabbit and Cat Radio (NCT Dream ジェミンのうさぎちゃんねこちゃんラジオ)	Host	

== Accolades ==
=== Awards and nominations ===
List of awards and nominations, with name of the award, year of ceremony, recipient, category, and result of the nomination
Award	Year	Recipient	Category	Result	Ref.
Seoul International Drama Awards	2026	Wind Up	Asian Star Award – South Korea (Actor)	Won	
Seoul Webfest Awards	2020	The Way I Hate You	Best Actor (Korean)	Won	

=== Listicles ===
List of listicle placements, with name of the publisher, year of listing, name of the listicle, and placement
Publisher	Year	Listicle	Placement	Ref.
Billboard	2024	K-Pop Artist 100	89th	
Billboard	2025	K-Pop Artist 100	78th	
