= The Dream Show 4: Dream the Future =

2025–2026 concert tour by NCT Dream

- World tour by NCT Dream
- Associated album: Go Back to the Future; Beat It Up
- Start date: July 10, 2025
- End date: March 29, 2026
- Legs: 1
- No. of shows: 26

NCT Dream concert chronology
- The Dream Show 3: Dream( )scape (2024); The Dream Show 4: Dream the Future (2025–2026)

The Dream Show 4: Dream the Future (stylized as NCT DREAM TOUR 'THE DREAM SHOW4 : DREAM THE FUTURE') is the fourth worldwide concert tour headlined by NCT Dream, the third sub-unit of a South Korean boy group NCT, in support of their fifth studio album Go Back to the Future (2025). The tour began in July 2025 and concluded in March 2026.

== Background ==
NCT Dream announced their fourth world tour in May 2025. The tour kicked off in July 2025 in Seoul with a 3-day concert at Gocheok Sky Dome starting on July 10. On May 13, 2025, NCT Dream announced the first stops of the tour in Asia with more dates being announced later for Japan.

The tour is set to include a concert at the Kai Tak Stadium in Hong Kong on August 30, 2025, marking the first time a K-pop group will hold a concert at the newly opened stadium.

== Setlist ==
Seoul
1. "BTTF"
2. "Déjà Vu"
3. "Ridin' "
4. "ISTJ"
5. "BOOM"
6. "We Young"
7. "Dunk Shot"
8. "Candy"
9. "Hot Sauce"
10. "Diggity"
11. "1, 2, 3"
12. "On the way"
13. "YOU"
14. "La La Love"
15. "My Page"
16. "Best of Me"
17. "STRONGER"
18. "Smoothie"
19. "Moonlight (Korean version)"
20. "Broken Melodies"
21. "Trigger the fever"
22. "Hello Future"

Encore

23. "CHILLER"
24. "Off The Wall"
25. "Rocket"
26. "Heavenly"

=== Notes ===
- "Smoothie" was removed from the setlist after the Seoul shows.
- During the Bangkok and Jakarta shows, "ANL" was added after "Rocket".
- During all the shows in Japan, "Rocket" was replaced by "Best Friend Ever".
- Starting from the Taipei show, "ISTJ" was replaced by "Beat it Up".
Seoul finale
1. "Hello Future"
2. "Déjà Vu"
3. "BOOM"
4. "BTTF"
5. "Best of Me"
6. "No Escape"
7. "TRICKY"
8. "Hot Sauce"
9. "Irreplaceable"
10. "Better Than Gold"
11. "Be There For You"
12. " 'Bout You"
13. "Rainbow"
14. "Rains in Heaven"
15. "Beautiful Sailing"
16. "BOX"
17. "Beat it Up"
18. "CHILLER"
19. "Tempo"
20. "Moonlight (Korean version)"
21. "Broken Melodies"
22. "DREAM TEAM"
23. "Trigger the fever"

Encore

24. "Candle Light" (week 1)/"7 Days" (week 2)
25. "Dive Into You" (week 1)/"i hate fruits" (week 2)
26. "icantfeelanything" (week 2)
27. "Never Goodbye" (week 1)/"My Youth" (week 2)
28. "Dear DREAM"
29. "Graduation"

=== Notes ===
- During the last show, "Candy" and "Trigger the fever" were performed after "Graduation".

== Shows ==
List of concerts showing date, city, country, venue, and attendance
| Date | City | Country | Venue | Attendance |
|---|---|---|---|---|
| July 10, 2025 | Seoul | South Korea | Gocheok Sky Dome | 60,000 |
| July 11, 2025 | Seoul | South Korea | Gocheok Sky Dome | 60,000 |
| July 12, 2025 | Seoul | South Korea | Gocheok Sky Dome | 60,000 |
| August 16, 2025 | Bangkok | Thailand | Rajamangala National Stadium | 66,000 |
| August 17, 2025 | Bangkok | Thailand | Rajamangala National Stadium | 66,000 |
| August 30, 2025 | Hong Kong | | Kai Tak Stadium | 37,000 |
| September 27, 2025 | Jakarta | Indonesia | Jakarta International Stadium | — |
| September 28, 2025 | Jakarta | Indonesia | Jakarta International Stadium | — |
| October 18, 2025 | Singapore | | Singapore Indoor Stadium | |
| October 19, 2025 | Singapore | | Singapore Indoor Stadium | |
| November 15, 2025 | Saitama | Japan | Saitama Super Arena | 57,000 |
| November 16, 2025 | Saitama | Japan | Saitama Super Arena | 57,000 |
| December 6, 2025 | Taipei | Taiwan | Taipei Dome | — |
| December 13, 2025 | Kuala Lumpur | Malaysia | Axiata Arena | 18,000 |
| December 14, 2025 | Kuala Lumpur | Malaysia | Axiata Arena | 18,000 |
| January 8, 2026 | Osaka | Japan | Osaka-jō Hall | — |
| January 9, 2026 | Osaka | Japan | Osaka-jō Hall | — |
| January 10, 2026 | Osaka | Japan | Osaka-jō Hall | — |
| January 24, 2026 | Nagoya | Japan | Aichi Sky Expo Hall A | — |
| January 25, 2026 | Nagoya | Japan | Aichi Sky Expo Hall A | — |
| March 20, 2026 | Seoul | South Korea | KSPO Dome | |
| March 21, 2026 | Seoul | South Korea | KSPO Dome | |
| March 22, 2026 | Seoul | South Korea | KSPO Dome | |
| March 27, 2026 | Seoul | South Korea | KSPO Dome | |
| March 28, 2026 | Seoul | South Korea | KSPO Dome | |
| March 29, 2026 | Seoul | South Korea | KSPO Dome | |
