= Candy (EP) =

- Digital and Photobook version cover

EP by NCT Dream
- Released: December 16, 2022
- Length: 21:22
- Language: Korean
- Labels: SM; Dreamus

NCT Dream chronology
Glitch Mode (2022)	Candy (2022)	ISTJ (2023)

NCT chronology
2 Baddies (2022)	Candy (2022)	Phantom (2022)

Singles from Candy
- 1. "Candy" Released: December 16, 2022

Candy is the fifth extended play (EP) by South Korean boy band NCT Dream. It was released digitally on December 16, 2022, and physically on December 19, 2022, by SM Entertainment through Dreamus. Marketed as a special winter mini-album, the EP consists of six Christmas-themed tracks, including its lead single of the same name, originally released by H.O.T. in 1996.

== Background ==
NCT Dream released their second studio album, Glitch Mode, in March 2022, followed shortly afterwards by its reissue, Beatbox. It became their second release to sell more than 3 million copies after Hot Sauce (2021). The album charted at number one on the Gaon Album Chart in South Korea, while in the United States it was their first entry on the Billboard 200, charting at number 50. In support of the release, they embarked on their third concert tour, The Dream Show 2: In A Dream, in September 2022, visiting South Korea and Japan. A concert film, NCT Dream The Movie: In A Dream, documenting their opening concert held in Seoul was released in theaters in November. That same month, the group announced they would release their first Japanese single, "Best Friend Ever", in February 2023.

== Composition ==
The EP includes six Christmas-themed tracks. "Tangerine Love (Favorite)" is described as a retro song featuring "funky" analog synthesizers. "Take My Breath" is described as a mid-tempo pop song, with lyrics about a "shy" confession. "Moon" is described as a ballad song led by a piano melody. "Walk with You" is described as a dance pop song that follows the same storyline of the group's 2017 track "Walk You Home" from their first EP We Young. "Graduation" is described as a R&B song that harmonizes the vocals with the strings. It was highlighted as the standout track of the EP by Jeff Benjamin of Billboard.

== Release and promotion ==
NCT Dream first hinted at a new release during an Instagram live broadcast on November 17. The next day, SM Entertainment released a teaser video clip featuring snow falling on an illustrated house named after NCT Dream covered in Christmas-themed decorations, including bows, mini Christmas trees, candy canes and peppermints. It served to announce the group's fifth extended play (EP), Candy, titled after its lead single of the same name, originally released by H.O.T. for their debut studio album We Hate All Kinds of Violence (1996). On November 21, it became available for pre-order in both online and offline stores. Winter themed teaser images of the members wearing colorful outfits reminiscent of H.O.T.'s stage costumes were released on December 2, and were followed by individual teaser images of the members, released from December 4 to December 9. Marketed as a special winter mini-album, the EP was released digitally on December 16 and physically on December 19.

NCT Dream performed "Candy" alongside their previous single "Glitch Mode" at the 2022 KBS Song Festival on the same day of release. The group performed "Candy" and "Graduation" on South Korean music show Show! Music Core on December 17. NCT Dream held a live broadcast on social media platforms YouTube and TikTok to commemorate the release on December 19. On December 21, the group performed all of the album's tracks at their fan meeting held at Peace Hall, Kyung Hee University, hosted by H.O.T.'s member Kangta. It was broadcast on Beyond Live.

=== Pop-up stores ===
Three pop-up stores were opened in Seongsu-dong, Hongdae and Yeonhui-dong on December 20. Fans reportedly queued from dawn on the day of the opening and formed lines of over 3,000 people in front of each store to get the exclusive photo cards sold with the EP.

== Commercial performance ==
Despite being a special mini-album, Candy achieved 2 million pre-orders, according to SM Entertainment. The EP debuted at number 28 on the Billboard Japan Japanese Hot Albums in the chart issue dated December 21, 2022, and two weeks later it peaked at number two. It debuted at number eight on the Oricon Digital Albums in the chart issue dated December 26, 2022.

== Track listing ==
Candy track listing
No.	Title	Lyrics	Music	Arrangement	Length
1.	"Candy"	Jang Yong-jin	Jang Yong-jin	Kenzie	3:37
2.	"Graduation"	Kenzie	Kenzie; Benjamin 55; Junny; Zayson	Kenzie; Benjamin 55	3:57
3.	"Tangerine Love (Favorite)"	Choi Seo-yul	JBach; Landon Sears; David "Dwilly" Wilson; Patrick Lok; MZMC	David "Dwilly" Wilson; Pat Lok; MZMC	2:58
4.	"Take My Breath" (Korean: 입김; RR: Ipgim; lit. 'Steam of Breath')	Hwang Yu-bin; Mark	Willie Weeks; Justin Starling; Ryan Curtis	Willie Weeks	3:00
5.	"Moon" (문; Mun)	MinGtion; Dvwn	MinGtion; Dvwn	MinGtion	4:13
6.	"Walk with You" (발자국; Baljaguk; 'Footprint')	Kim Chae-ah (153/Joombas)	Adrian McKinnon; Tak (Newtype); 1Take (Newtype)	Newtype	3:35
Total length:					21:22

== Charts ==
=== Weekly charts ===
Weekly chart performance for Candy
Chart (2022–2023)	Peak position
Belgian Albums (Ultratop Flanders)	112
Japanese Albums (Oricon)	2
Japanese Combined Albums (Oricon)	2
Japanese Hot Albums (Billboard Japan)	2
South Korean Albums (Circle)	1

=== Monthly charts ===
Monthly chart performance for Candy
Chart (2022–2023)	Peak position
Japanese Albums (Oricon)	6
South Korean Albums (Circle)	1

=== Year-end charts ===
2022 year-end chart performance for Candy
Chart (2022)	Position
South Korean Albums (Circle)	13
South Korean Albums (Circle) SMC vers.	85

2023 year-end chart performance for Candy
Chart (2023)	Position
Japanese Albums (Oricon)	55
Japanese Hot Albums (Billboard Japan)	64

== Certifications and sales ==
Region	Certification	Certified units/sales
South Korea (KMCA)	Million	1,727,966
South Korea (KMCA) SMC version	Platinum	395,702

== Release history ==
Release formats for Candy
Region	Date	Format	Label	Ref.
Various	December 16, 2022	Digital download; streaming	SM; Dreamus	
Various	December 19, 2022	CD	SM; Dreamus	
