= Jisung =

South Korean singer, dancer, and actor (born 2002)

- Jisung in 2025
- Born: Park Ji-sung; February 5, 2002 (age 24); Seoul, South Korea
- Occupations: Singer; rapper; dancer; actor
- Years active: 2000s–present
- Musical career
- Genre: K-pop
- Instrument: Vocals
- Label: SM
- Member of: NCT; NCT Dream
- Formerly of: SM Rookies

Korean name
- Hangul: 박지성
- RR: Bak Jiseong
- MR: Pak Chisŏng

Park Ji-sung (Korean: 박지성; born February 5, 2002), known mononymously as Jisung is a South Korean singer, rapper, dancer, and actor. He rose to prominence as a member of the K-pop boy band NCT and its sub-unit NCT Dream.

Born in Seoul, Jisung began his career as a child actor and dancer. In 2013, he started training under SM Entertainment and joined the label's official team of trainees, SM Rookies, appearing on television and touring both in South Korea and abroad. He made his debut in 2016 with NCT, which went on to achieve commercial success and become an influential K-pop act. Beyond his music career, Jisung has appeared on variety shows and television series such as Crash (2024–2026).

== Life and career ==
=== 2002–2013: Early life and career beginnings ===
Park Ji-sung was born on February 5, 2002, in Mia-dong, Gangbuk-gu, Seoul, South Korea. He started taking dance lessons as a child at the suggestion of his kindergarten teacher to help build his confidence. He then began learning popping and joined Nam Hyun-joon's Kids Crew, appearing on the KBS2 reality competition series Immortal Songs: Singing the Legend (2011–present), among others. He also trained in b-boying. At the age of seven, he began his career as a child actor, appearing on the KBS2 children's television series TV Kindergarten (1987–present), Chung Ji-young's legal drama film Unbowed (2011), Jang Tae-yoo's television series Deep Rooted Tree (2011), and the CCTV event International Children's Concert (2012), among others.

In 2013, Jisung participated in the tryouts for the Mnet reality competition series Dancing 9 (2013–2015), where he was scouted by a casting director from SM Entertainment. While he was initially reluctant, his mother was familiar with the company and convinced him to audition. After passing and becoming a trainee, he remained unsure, but watching concerts by other SM artists ultimately convinced him to commit to his career. At SM, trainees could receive lessons in singing, musical instruments, acting, modeling, beatboxing, public speaking, foreign languages, and dance styles such as ballet and jazz, depending on their interests and strengths. While training at the company, Jisung's skills were praised by the American choreographer Tony Testa.

=== 2013–2025: SM Rookies and NCT ===
Jisung at the 24th Dream Concert in May 2018

SM publicly introduced Jisung as a member of its official training team, SM Rookies, on December 17, 2013, via its social media accounts alongside his fellow trainee Mark. The agency's first program of its kind, SM Rookies allowed trainees to gain experience and public exposure before their debut, often grouping them by gender and concept into distinct units. As part of the team, Jisung appeared in the 2014 variety show Exo 90:2014 with the boy band Exo and the 2015 South Korean revival of The Mickey Mouse Club (1995–1996) with Super Junior's Leeteuk, performing songs, dances, and comedy skits. He also participated in the concert tours SM Town Live World Tour IV (2014–2015), featuring several SM artists coming together to perform under the musical collective SM Town, and SM Rookies Show (2015–2016), held in South Korea and Thailand, in which the team covered songs by SM artists.

In August 2016, SM announced that Jisung would join NCT, a boy band designed with a concept of unlimited members where smaller sub-units would debut independently and occasionally collaborate under the sub-unit NCT U. He debuted on August 25 with NCT's third sub-unit, NCT Dream, performing their first single, "Chewing Gum", on the television music program M Countdown. Initially established as NCT's teen unit, all members debuted as minors under a graduation system where they would leave the group upon reaching adulthood; however, the graduation concept was scrapped in 2020. Music critics described NCT Dream as the unit with the most compelling narrative, remarking on how their transition from teen pop to a blend of hip-hop and R&B music reflected the members' artistic growth from adolescence to adulthood. Jisung contributed to the band's first full-group album, NCT 2018 Empathy (2018), and made his first appearance under NCT U with the track "Faded in My Last Song", released in October 2020. Grammy.com stated that NCT became one of the most influential K-pop acts; in particular, NCT Dream achieved commercial success, recording ten consecutive million-seller albums.

In May 2018, Jisung joined the cast of the JTBC variety show Why Not – The Dancer, traveling to Los Angeles to collaborate with local choreographers. Later that September, he appeared on the KBS2 reality competition series Dancing High, joining Hoya's team. In November 2020, he paused his promotional activities for NCT's second full-group album, NCT 2020 Resonance, due to a knee injury.

=== 2026–present: Television work ===
In July 2026, Jisung starred in the ENA variety show All or Nothing, which followed the cast to Egypt, as they competed for the title of "prince". The following month, ten years after his debut, it was announced that Jisung had renewed his exclusive contract with SM. Later that November, he appeared as a new police recruit in the second season of the procedural drama television series Crash (2024–2026). Jisung trained for the action scenes to prepare for the role. Ahead of its premiere, he collaborated with his bandmate Chenle to release the single "Smash It" in October for the series's soundtrack.

== Other ventures ==
=== Endorsements ===
In May 2026, Jisung became the brand ambassador for the Chinese hair care brand Okcs. He has also appeared in fashion magazines promoting Dior Beauty.

=== Advocacy and philanthropy ===
In April 2020, Jisung participated in a campaign organized by The Hankyoreh to encourage people to vote. Later that June, he and his bandmate Jeno became ambassadors of an awareness campaign organized by Maeil Business Newspaper to prevent illegal filming and digital sex crimes. In March 2025, he donated ₩50 million to the Community Chest of Korea to aid recovery efforts for the wildfires that broke out that month. In February 2026, on his birthday, he donated ₩250 million to the Samsung Medical Center to support pancreatic cancer research.

== Discography ==
=== Promotional singles ===
List of promotional singles, with year of release and associated album
Title	Year	Album
"Smash It" (천지 콤비) (with Chenle)	2026	Non-album single

=== Other charted songs ===
List of other charted songs, with year of release, selected chart positions, and associated album
Title	Year	Peak chart positions	Album
Title	Year	KOR DL	Album
"Snow Dream 2021" (with Yeri, Haechan, Chenle, and Ningning)	2021	83	2021 Winter SM Town: SMCU Express

=== Writing credits ===
Key
Indicates songs in which writers are credited specifically for the Korean lyrics

List of songs by name, with credited artist(s), lyricist(s), composer(s), associated album, and year of release
Title	Artist(s)	Lyricist(s)	Composer(s)	Album	Year	Ref.
"Best Friend"	NCT Dream	Le'mon; Jeno; Jaemin; Jisung	Jamil "Digi" Chammas; Anthony Russo; MZMC	We Boom	2019	
"Breathing" (숨)	NCT Dream	Woo Seung-yeon; Mark; Jeno; Jaemin; Jisung	Micky Blue; Realmeee; Patrick Liney; Cosmo Liney; Etham Basden; Mark; Jeno; Jaemin; Jisung	Dream()scape	2024	
"Bye My First..." (사랑이 좀 어려워)	NCT Dream	Ryu Da-som; Kim Eun-joo; Jeno; Jaemin; Jisung	Benjamin Ingrosso; Livvi Franc; Louis Schoorl	We Boom	2019	
"Dear Dream"	NCT Dream	Baek Geum-min; Lee Soo-jung; Jisung; Jaemin; Jeno; Mark	Anton Ewald; Simon Johansson; Sebastian Thott	We Go Up	2018	
"It's Yours" (너를 위한 단어)	NCT Dream	Lee Jae-ni; Mark; Jeno; Jaemin; Jisung	High Squad	Glitch Mode	2022	
"Like We Just Met"	NCT Dream	Mark; Renjun; Jeno; Haechan; Jaemin; Chenle; Jisung	Allegro; Dan Johnson; Robbie Jay; Mark; Jeno; Jaemin	ISTJ	2023	
"Never Goodbye" (북극성)	NCT Dream	Hwang Yu-bin; Mark; Jeno; Jaemin; Jisung	Zayson; Kim Ji-hoo	Glitch Mode	2022	
"Rainbow" (책갈피)	NCT Dream	Jo Yoon-kyung; Mark; Jeno; Jaemin; Jisung	Jurek Reunamäki; Rik Annema; Cimo Fränkel; Annie Schindel; Griff Clawson	Hot Sauce	2021	
"Replay" (내일봐)	NCT Dream	Hwang Yu-bin; Mark; Jeno; Jisung	Ludwig Lindell; Gregory G. Curtis II	Glitch Mode	2022	

== Filmography ==
=== Film ===
Year	Title	Role	Ref.
2011	Unbowed	Shim-won	

=== Television ===
Year	Title	Role	Notes	Ref.
2010	TV Kindergarten	Cast member		
2011	Deep Rooted Tree	—N/a		
2018	Why Not – The Dancer (Why Not – 더댄서)	Cast member		
2018	Dancing High	Contestant		
2026	All or Nothing (왕자와 거지)	Cast member		
2026	Crash	Ji Dae-se	Season 2	

=== Music video ===
Year	Title	Artist	Ref.
2015	"Champagne" (샴페인)	U-Know	

== Accolades ==
=== Listicles ===
List of listicle placements, with name of the publisher, year of listing, name of the listicle, and placement
Publisher	Year	Listicle	Placement	Ref.
Billboard	2024	K-Pop Artist 100	90th	
Billboard	2025	K-Pop Artist 100	80th	
