= ISTJ (album) =

Studio album by NCT Dream
- Released: July 17, 2023
- Genres: K-pop; R&B; hip hop
- Length: 33:04
- Language: Korean
- Labels: SM; Kakao

NCT Dream chronology
Candy (2022)	ISTJ (2023)	Dream()Scape (2024)

NCT chronology
Perfume (2023)	ISTJ (2023)	Golden Age (2023)

Singles from ISTJ
- 1. "Broken Melodies" Released: June 19, 2023; 2. "ISTJ" Released: July 17, 2023

Professional ratings
Review scores
Source	Rating
NME	4/5 stars

ISTJ is the third studio album by South Korean boy band NCT Dream. Released on July 17, 2023, by SM Entertainment through Kakao Entertainment, the album consists of 10 tracks and is supported by the singles "Broken Melodies" and "ISTJ".

== Background and release ==
On June 13, 2023, SM Entertainment announced that NCT Dream would be making a comeback with a new studio album, ISTJ, on July 17, seven months after their previous release, Candy. The album also follows the conclusion of the group's The Dream Show 2: In A Dream concert tour. ISTJ was confirmed to have 10 tracks, including the lead single "Broken Melodies", which was released on June 19. NCT Dream began promotions for ISTJ with performances of "Broken Melodies" on music programs such as M Countdown, Music Bank, Show! Music Core, and Inkigayo. A preview and track video of the song "Poison" was released on July 7. The title track, "ISTJ", served as the second single, was released on the same day as the album. The song was accompanied by a colorful music video, which features the group members being transported to "MBTI World".

The name of the album refers to one of the 16 Myers–Briggs Type Indicators, a personality type characterized by introversion, sensing, thinking and judging.

== Composition ==
The opening and title track, "ISTJ" is a hip hop dance song, expressing desire to deviate from the stereotypes of MBTI personality types. Specifically, the song is written from the perspective of an ENFP individual and directed towards an opposite-personality ISTJ individual. The second track, and the lead single, "Broken Melodies" is a solemn pop song, with the accompanying music video featuring calls at a phone booth and depicting the struggles of a long-term relationship. "Yogurt Shake" is a sweet melodic song characterized by harmonic vocals. The fifth track, "Blue Wave", is a bright and rhythmic pop song, acting as a sequel to "Dive into You", a song from a previous album, Hot Sauce. It also features sounds of a pan flute and fast-paced lyrics. "Poison" is a sensual R&B song, conveying contradictory feelings of love, while "SOS" is a powerful hip hop dance song characterized by synth sounds. "Pretzel" is a futuristic hip hop song, featuring electronic synths, while "Starry Night" features sounds of an acoustic guitar and trap beats. The final song of the album, "Like We Just Met" is a slow ballad written by all members of the group and expresses the group's desire to stay with their fans forever.

== Commercial performance ==
On July 17, the album's preorders surpassed 4.2 million copies, a new record for NCT Dream. In the first week of release, the album sold over 3.65 million copies, becoming the third highest selling album in its first-week in South Korea. It also marked the third-largest sales week for albums in South Korea, according to the sales numbers on the Hanteo Chart. In the United States, "Blue Wave" became NCT Dream's first number one on Billboard's Hot Trending Songs.

According to the International Federation of the Phonographic Industry (IFPI)'s Global Music Report for 2023, ISTJ was the sixth most-consumed album across all formats, and the third best-selling album worldwide, having sold 4.6 million units. (Note: The IFPI Global Albums chart ranks, in order, the albums that generated the most money globally across streaming, download, and physical record sales (combined) in a calendar year. The Global Album Sales Chart measures global unit sales across all physical formats, as well as full album downloads.)

== Accolades ==
Awards and nominations for "ISTJ"
Award ceremony	Year	Category	Result	Ref.
Circle Chart Music Awards	2024	Artist of the Year – Album	Won	
Circle Chart Music Awards	2024	Digital Album of the Year	Won	
Golden Disc Awards	2024	Album Bonsang	Won	
MAMA Awards	2023	Album of the Year	Nominated	
Melon Music Awards	2023	Album of the Year	Nominated	

== Track listing ==
ISTJ track listing
No.	Title	Lyrics	Music	Arrangement	Length
1.	"ISTJ"	Kenzie	Kenzie; Ronny Svendsen; Adrian Thesen; Anne Judith Wik; Bobii Lewis	Kenzie; Ronny Svendsen; Pizzapunk	3:05
2.	"Broken Melodies"	Bang Hye-hyun (Jam Factory); Park Tae-won; Anne Judith Wik; Sevn Dayz	Ronny Svendsen; Adrian Thesen; Anne Judith Wik; Sevn Dayz	Ronny Svendsen; Pizzapunk	3:46
3.	"Yogurt Shake"	Wutan	Jayrah Gibson; Adrian Mckinnon; John Fulford; JT Roach; Timothy 'Bos' Bullock	Bullock	3:17
4.	"Skateboard"	Suan (153/Joombas)	Sebastian Thott; Alex Karlsson; Didrik Thott	S. Thott	3:06
5.	"Blue Wave" (Korean: 파랑; RR: Parang; lit. 'Blue')	Jo Yoon-kyung	Brandon Arreaga; Edwin Honoret; Gino the Ghost	Arreaga	3:10
6.	"Poison" (모래성; Moraeseong; 'Sand Castle')	Jang Jung-won (Jam Factory)	Ludvig Evers; Jonatan Gusmark; Bobii Lewis; Parker Ighile	Moonshine	3:32
7.	"SOS"	Rick Bridges	1-800-Rudeboy; Je'Juan Antonio; Jordain Johnson; Hautboi Rich	1-800-Rudeboy	2:59
8.	"Pretzel (♡)"	Jang	Ludwig Lindell; Chris Meyer; Pontus 'Oneye' Kalm	Lindell; Kalm	3:25
9.	"Starry Night" (제자리 걸음; Jejari georeum; 'Walking in Place')	Jang Eun-jung	HRDR; Justin Reinstein	HRDR	3:10
10.	"Like We Just Met"	Mark; Renjun; Jeno; Haechan; Jaemin; Chenle; Jisung	Allegro; Dan Johnson; Robbie Jay; Mark; Jeno; Jaemin	Allegro	3:29
Total length:					33:07

Broken Melodies bonus tracks
No.	Title	Lyrics	Music	Arrangement	Length
11.	"Broken Melodies" (with Jvke)	Bang Hye-hyun (Jam Factory); Park Tae-won; Anne Judith Wik; Sevn Dayz	Ronny Svendsen; Adrian Thesen; Anne Judith Wik; Sevn Dayz	Ronny Svendsen; Pizzapunk	3:46
Total length:					36:53

== Charts ==
=== Weekly charts ===
Weekly chart performance for ISTJ
Chart (2023)	Peak position
Australian Albums (ARIA)	20
Belgian Albums (Ultratop Flanders)	102
Belgian Albums (Ultratop Wallonia)	25
Croatian International Albums (HDU)	20
French Albums (SNEP)	16
German Albums (Offizielle Top 100)	46
Hungarian Physical Albums (MAHASZ)	4
Japanese Albums (Oricon)	2
Japanese Combined Albums (Oricon)	2
Japanese Hot Albums (Billboard Japan)	2
New Zealand Albums (RMNZ)	30
Portuguese Albums (AFP)	1
South Korean Albums (Circle)	1
Spanish Albums (Promusicae)	28
Swiss Albums (Schweizer Hitparade)	80
US Billboard 200	28
US Independent Albums (Billboard)	6
US World Albums (Billboard)	3

=== Monthly charts ===
Monthly chart performance for ISTJ
Chart (2023)	Position
Japanese Albums (Oricon)	5
South Korean Albums (Circle)	1

=== Year-end charts ===
Year-end chart performance for ISTJ
Chart (2023)	Position
Global Albums (IFPI)	6
Japanese Albums (Oricon)	45
Japanese Hot Albums (Billboard Japan)	36
South Korean Albums (Circle)	5

=== Single ===
==== Weekly charts ====
Weekly chart performance for "Broken Melodies"
Chart (2023)	Peak position
Global 200 (Billboard)	179
Hungary (Single Top 40)	28
Indonesia (Billboard)	16
Japan (Japan Hot 100)	83
South Korea (Circle)	28
UK Singles Downloads (Official Charts)	12
UK Singles Sales (OCC)	13
US World Digital Song Sales (Billboard)	8

Weekly chart performance for "ISTJ"
Chart (2023)	Peak position
Global 200 (Billboard)	125
Japan (Japan Hot 100)	51
South Korea (Circle)	2

== Certifications and sales ==
Certifications and sales for ISTJ
Region	Certification	Certified units/sales
Japan (RIAJ)	Gold	100,000^{^}
South Korea (KMCA)	3× Million	3,000,000^{^}
South Korea (KMCA) Nemo version	2× Platinum	500,000^{^}
South Korea (KMCA) SMC version	Platinum	250,000^{^}
Summaries
Worldwide (IFPI)	—	4,600,000
^{^} Shipments figures based on certification alone.

== Release history ==
Release history for ISTJ
Region	Date	Format	Label
South Korea	July 17, 2023	CD; SMC	SM; Kakao
Various	July 17, 2023	Digital download; streaming	SM; Kakao
United States	August 18, 2023	CD	SM
Europe	August 18, 2023	CD	SM
Latin America	August 18, 2023	CD	SM
Australia	August 18, 2023	CD	SM
New Zealand	August 18, 2023	CD	SM
United Kingdom	September 15, 2023	CD	SM
