= We Go Up (NCT Dream song) =

2018 single by NCT Dream

Single by NCT Dream

from the EP We Go Up
- Language: Korean; Chinese
- Released: August 30, 2018
- Studio: SM Studios, Seoul, South Korea
- Genre: Hip-hop
- Length: 3:03
- Label: SM Entertainment; Dreamus
- Songwriters: Mark Lee; MZMC; Andrew Bazzi; Michael Woods (Rice N' Peas); Kevin White (Rice N' Peas); Kenzie
- Producers: Rice N' Peas; Kenzie

NCT Dream singles chronology
"GO" (2018)	"We Go Up" (2018)	"Candle Light" (2018)

NCT singles chronology
"Chain" (2018)	"We Go Up" (2018)	"Regular" (2018)

Music video
- "We Go Up" on YouTube

"We Go Up" is a song recorded by South Korean boy band NCT Dream, the youth-oriented unit of the group NCT under the management of SM Entertainment, as the lead single for their third homonymous extended play. It was digitally released by SM Entertainment, with Dreamus as the South Korea distributor, along with its music video on August 30, 2018.

== Background and release ==
In August, SM Entertainment announced that NCT Dream would release a new EP, We Go Up, on September 3. It was also announced that this would have been Mark's last comeback, due to him graduating from the group in the following December. On August 22, the "timeline" for the comeback was revealed. On August 29, 2018, the teaser for the music video was released.

== Composition ==
"We Go Up" was written by Kenzie and Mark. The former also participated in the production alongside Andrew Bazzi, MZMC, Michael Woods (Rice N' Peas) and Kevin White (Rice N' Peas). Rice N' Peas also worked on the arrangement. Musically, the song is described as a "retro vibe", hip-hop track with "tinny percussion and booming bass" that "drive the track as the members serve up swaggering raps and harmonious vocals".

== Commercial performance ==
"We Go Up" debuted at number 73 on the Gaon Digital Chart for the week September 8, 2018, making it the group's highest-charting song to date. The song debuted on the US World Digital Song Sales chart at number 11 and on the K-Pop Hot 100 at number 7.

== Music video ==
The music video for "We Go Up" focuses heavily on the choreography and shows the group enjoying summer and playing around. Eccentric motifs like bubbles and rocket ships are also included.

== Charts ==
Weekly chart performance for "We Go Up"
Chart (2018)	Peak position
South Korea (Gaon)	73
South Korea (K-pop Hot 100)	7
US World Digital Song Sales (Billboard)	11

== Sales ==
Sales for "We Go Up"
Region	Sales
United States	1,000

== Release history ==
Release history and formats for "We Go Up"
Region	Date	Format	Label
Various	August 30, 2018	Digital download; streaming	SM Entertainment; Dreamus

== Credits and personnel ==
Credits adapted from album's liner notes.

=== Studio ===
- SM LVYIN Studio – recording, digital editing
- The Vibe Studio – recording
- doobdoob Studio – digital editing
- SM Big Shot Studio – engineered for mix
- SM Yellow Tail Studio – mixing
- Sterling Sound – mastering

=== Personnel ===
- SM Entertainment – executive producer
- Lee Soo-man – producer
- Yoo Young-jin – music and sound supervisor
- NCT Dream – vocals
  - Mark – lyrics, background vocals
  - Renjun – background vocals
  - Haechan – background vocals
  - Chenle – background vocals
- Michael Woods (Rice N' Peas) – producer, composition, arrangement
- Kevin White (Rice N' Peas) – producer, composition, arrangement
- Kenzie – producer, lyrics, composition, vocal directing
- Bazzi – composition
- MZMC – composition
- Andrew Choi – background vocals
- Lee Ji-hong – recording, digital editing
- Jeong Mo-yeon – recording
- Jang Woo-young – digital editing
- Lee Min-kyu – engineered for mix
- Koo Jong-pil – mixing
- Joe LaPorta – mastering
