= The First (single album) =

Single album by NCT Dream
- Released: February 9, 2017
- Recorded: 2016–2017
- Language: Korean
- Label: SM Entertainment

NCT Dream chronology
The First (2017)	We Young (2017)

NCT chronology
Limitless (2017)	The First (2017)	Cherry Bomb (2017)

Singles from The First
- 1. "Chewing Gum" Released: August 24, 2016; 2. "My First and Last" Released: February 9, 2017

"The First" is the debut double A-side single by South Korean-Chinese boy band NCT Dream, the third sub-unit of the South Korean boy band NCT. It was released on February 9, 2017 with "My First and Last" serving as the single's title track.

== Background and release ==
NCT's third unit, NCT Dream, consists of seven members: Mark, Renjun, Jeno, Haechan, Jaemin, Chenle, and Jisung. They debuted with the digital single "Chewing Gum" on August 24, 2016.

On February 1, 2017, NCT Dream announced that they would be releasing their first single, "The First". SM Entertainment announced that Jaemin will not be participating in this comeback due to his health problems.

Described as a lively dance track with a light-hearted melody and a pounding bass, "My First and Last" served as the album's title track and was released on February 9, in both Korean and Mandarin versions. The album also includes a cover of Lee Seung-hwan's 1993 hit song "Dunk Shot".

== Promotion ==
The group had their first comeback stage on Mnet's M Countdown on February 9 where they performed "My First and Last" and "Dunk Shot".

== Commercial performance ==
"The First" debuted at number one on the Gaon Album Chart on the chart issue dated February 5–11, 2017. It placed at number 40 on Gaon's year-end chart. After years from its release, the album re-entered on the Gaon Chart at number 12 for the month of February, 2021.

== Track listing ==
The First track listing
No.	Title	Lyrics	Music	Arrangement	Length
1.	"My First and Last" (Korean: 마지막 첫사랑; RR: Majimak cheotsarang; lit. 'Last First Love')	Jeon Gan-di; Mark	August Rigo; Justin Davey; Ryan S. Jhun	Rigo; Davey; Jhun	3:22
2.	"My First and Last" (Chinese: 最后的初恋; pinyin: Zuìhòu De Chūliàn; lit. 'The Last First Love')	Arys Chien	Rigo; Davey; Jhun	Rigo; Davey; Jhun	3:22
3.	"Dunk Shot" (Korean: 덩크슛; RR: Deongkeusyut)	Kim Kwang-jin	Kim	Kenzie	3:54
4.	"Chewing Gum"	Jo Yoon-kyung; Moon Seol-ri; Jung Min-ji; Mark	Thomas Troelsen; Kenzie	Troelsen; Kenzie	3:21
5.	"Chewing Gum" (Chinese: 泡泡糖; pinyin: Pàopaotáng)	Chien	Troelsen; Kenzie	Troelsen; Kenzie	3:21
Total length:					17:19

== Credits and personnel ==
Credits adapted from Xiami.

- G-High – vocal directing (track 1–2), recording (track 1–2), digital editing (track 1–2)
- Kenzie – vocal directing (track 3–5), background vocals (track 3–5)
- MQ – rap directing (track 4–5)
- NCT Dream – vocals, background vocals
  - Mark – vocals, background vocals (track 3), rap making (track 3)
  - Renjun – vocals, background vocals (track 3)
  - Jeno – vocals, background vocals (track 3)
  - Haechan – vocals, background vocals (track 3)
  - Jaemin – vocals, background vocals (track 3)
  - Chenle – vocals, background vocals (track 3)
  - Jisung – vocals, background vocals (track 3)
- Onestar – background vocals (track 1–2)
- August Rigo – background vocals (track 1–2)
- Kye Bum-joo – background vocals (track 3–5)
- Choi Hoon – bass performer (track 3)
- Hong Joon-ho – guitar performer (track 3)
- Lee Min-gyu – recording (track 3–5), digital editing (track 3–5)
- Jeong Eun-gyeong – recording (track 3–5), digital editing (track 4–5)
- Lee Chang-seon – recording (track 3)
- Jung Eui-seok – recording (track 4), mixing (track 4–5)
- Jang Woo-yeong – digital editing (track 4)
- Nam Gung-jin – mixing (track 1)
- Jin NamKoong – mixing (track 2)
- Goo Jong-pil (BeatBurger) – mixing (track 3)

=== Locations ===
Recording

- SM Big Shot Studio
- SM Blue Cup Studio
- SM Blue Ocean Studio
- SM Yellow Tail Studio
- MonoTree Studio
- In Grid Studio
- prelude Studio

Editing

- SM Big Shot Studio
- SM Yellow Tail Studio
- MonoTree Studio
- doobdoob Studio
- In Grid Studio

Mixing

- SM Concert Hall Studio
- SM Yellow Tail Studio
- SM Blue Cup Studio

== Charts ==
=== Weekly charts ===
Weekly chart performance for The First
Chart (2017)	Peak position
South Korea (Gaon Album Chart)	1

=== Monthly charts ===
Monthly chart performance for The First
Chart (February 2017)	Peak position
South Korea (Gaon Album Chart)	6

=== Year-end charts ===
Year-end chart performance for The First
Chart (2017)	Peak position
South Korea (Gaon Album Chart)	40

== Accolades ==
Music program awards
Song	Program	Date
"My First and Last"	The Show (SBS MTV)	February 14, 2017
"My First and Last"	The Show (SBS MTV)	February 21, 2017
"My First and Last"	The Show (SBS MTV)	February 28, 2017
