= We Boom =

- Digital and We version cover.

EP by NCT Dream
- Released: July 26, 2019
- Recorded: 2019
- Studio: SM Studios (Seoul)
- Genre: K-pop
- Length: 21:22
- Language: Korean
- Labels: SM Entertainment; Dreamus
- Producers: Ryan S. Jhun; Yoo Young-jin; Deez; Moonshine; Cazzi Opeia; Benjamin Ingrosso; Livvi Franc; Louis Schoorl; Jamil `Digi` Christmas; Anthony Russo; MZMC

NCT Dream chronology
We Go Up (2018)	We Boom (2019)	The Dream (2020)

NCT chronology
We Are Superhuman (2019)	We Boom (2019)	Take Over the Moon (2019)

Singles from We Boom
- 1. "Boom" Released: July 26, 2019

We Boom is the third extended play of South Korean–Chinese boy band NCT Dream, the third and teen-aged sub-unit of the South Korean boy band NCT. Released by SM Entertainment and Dreamus digitally on July 26, 2019, and later physically three days later, the EP consists of six tracks, and is the first release of the unit to not contain any Mandarin version for the lead single. SM founder Lee Soo-man continued as the release's executive producer, while several songwriters and producers, such as Ryan S. Jhun, Yoo Young-jin, Sonny J Mason, Deez, Moonshine, Cazzi Opeia, Benjamin Ingrosso, Livvi Franc, Louis Schoorl, Bobii Lewis, Jamil `Digi` Christmas, MZMC, and others, contributed both lyrics and production to the extended play. It was the unit's first major release as a sextet, following the graduation of member Mark in December 2018.

Commercially, the extended play experienced success in South Korea; it became the unit's third chart-topper on the Gaon Album Chart, their first release to receive a Platinum certificate by KMCA, and subsequently the best-selling release by an NCT unit in 2019. In the United States, the EP earned the unit their best sales week to date while becoming the group their second and third top-ten entry on the Billboard World Albums and Billboard Heatseekers Albums, respectively. In conjunction to the EP's promotion, "Boom" was released as the lead single, to where it peaked at number ninety on the Gaon Digital Chart, while barely missing out the top ten on the Billboard World Digital Songs chart. The song, however, was the unit's first entry on the New Zealand Hot Singles chart, debuting at number forty, and has since become one of the unit's signature songs. The unit has since performed several songs from the extended play on The Dream Show and their Beyond LIVE concert in May 2020.

== Background and release ==
On July 8, 2019, it was announced that NCT Dream was preparing for a summer comeback. On July 17, it was revealed that NCT Dream would return with their third EP We Boom and the lead single "Boom" on July 26. Teaser photos were released for each member from July 17 to June 22. The music video teaser was released on July 24 and the full music video on July 26.

The EP was released digitally on July 26, 2019, through several music portals, including MelOn, iTunes and Spotify. The music video for the title song Boom was released the same day. The physical version was released on July 29. The EP title song Boom was described as a piece of urban Hip hop, featuring "powerful verses - a bridge in the latter half of the song that features expressive back-to-back belts by Haechan and Renjun and leads into a warm-toned display by Jisung." The group started promoting their title track "Boom" on July 26 together with "Stronger". They first performed the lead single on KBS' Music Bank, followed by performances on MBC's Show! Music Core and SBS' Inkigayo.

== Reception ==
=== Critical reception ===
Refinery29 ranked "Boom" as the 28th best K-pop song of 2019 while MTV ranked "Bye My First..." as the 12th best K-pop B-side of the year.

=== Commercial performance ===
The album became NCT Dream best sold album up till then, selling more than 300,000 units after a month of release. It also debut on Billboard World albums chart at #7 and NCT Dream was at #3 on Billboard Social 50 Chart. NCT Dream received two wins for "Boom" on The Show on August 6, 2019, and on August 20, 2019, respectively. We Boom later became the best selling album released by any NCT sub-unit up until and in the year of 2019.

== The Dream Show ==
The Dream Show is NCT Dream's first solo concert which lasted from November 2019 to March 2020.

=== Tour dates ===
List of concerts showing date, city, country, and venue
Date	City	Country	Venue
November 15, 2019	Seoul	South Korea	Jangchung Arena
November 16, 2019	Seoul	South Korea	Jangchung Arena
November 17, 2019	Seoul	South Korea	Jangchung Arena
December 1, 2019	Bangkok	Thailand	Thunder Dome Muang Thong Thani
December 2, 2019	Bangkok	Thailand	Thunder Dome Muang Thong Thani
January 26, 2020	Tokyo	Japan	Tokyo International Forum Hall A
January 27, 2020	Tokyo	Japan	NHK Hall
February 2, 2020	Kobe	Japan	Kobe Kokusai Hall
February 3, 2020	Kobe	Japan	Kobe Kokusai Hall
February 29, 2020	Manila	Philippines	New Frontier Theater
March 1, 2020	Jakarta	Indonesia	Istora Senayan

=== Cancelled tour dates due to Covid-19 ===
List of cancelled concerts showing date, city, country, and venue
Date	City	Country	Venue
February 7, 2020	Macau	China	Macau Broadway Theatre
February 8, 2020	Macau	China	Macau Broadway Theatre
February 15, 2020	Singapore		The Star Performing Arts Centre
March 13, 2020	Tokyo	Japan	Musashino Forest Sport Plaza
March 14, 2020	Tokyo	Japan	Musashino Forest Sport Plaza
March 15, 2020	Tokyo	Japan	Musashino Forest Sport Plaza

== Track listing ==
Credits adapted from Naver

We Boom
No.	Title	Lyrics	Music	Arrangement	Length
1.	"Boom"	Baek Geum-min (Song Carat); Lee Soo-jung (Song Carat); Kim Min-ji	Cedric "Dabenchwarma" Smith (3Sixty); Keynon "KC" Moore (3Sixty); Yoo Young-jin; Curtis Richardson (WayBetta); Adien Lewis (WayBetta); Ryan S. Jhun	3Sixty; Yoo Young-jin; WayBetta; Ryan S. Jhun	3:15
2.	"Stronger"	Hwang Yoo-bin; MQ (BeatBurger)	Bobii Lewis; Deez; Sonny J Mason	Sonny J Mason; Deez	3:26
3.	"119"	Baek Geum-min (Song Carat); Lee Soo-jung (Song Carat); Jeno; Jaemin	Jonatan Gusmark (Moonshine); Ludvig Evers (Moonshine); Cazzi Opeia (Sunshine); Ellen Berg Tollbom (Sunshine)	Moonshine	3:59
4.	"Bye My First…" (사랑이 좀 어려워; Sarangi jom eoryeowo; 'Love is a Little Difficult')	Ryu Da-som; Kim Eun-joo; Jeno; Jaemin; Jisung	Benjamin Ingrosso; Livvi Franc; Louis Schoorl	Louis Schoorl	3:27
5.	"Best Friend"	Le'mon (Joombas); Jeno; Jaemin; Jisung	Jamil "Digi" Chammas; Anthony Russo; MZMC	Jamil "Digi" Chammas	3:24
6.	"Dream Run"	Kyung Jin-hee; Jang Jung-won; Jeno	David Fremberg; Andreas Stone Johansson	David Fremberg; Andreas Stone Johansson	3:44
Total length:					21:22

== Charts ==
=== Album ===
==== Weekly charts ====
Chart (2019–21)	Peak position
French Digital Albums (SNEP)	33
Hungarian Albums (MAHASZ)	39
Japanese Albums (Oricon)	16
South Korean Albums (Gaon)	1
UK Album Downloads (Official Charts)	59

==== Year-end charts ====
Chart (2019)	Position
South Korean Albums (Gaon)	16
Chart (2021)	Position
South Korean Albums (Gaon)	79

=== Singles ===
==== "Boom" ====
Chart (2018)	Peak position
New Zealand Hot Singles (RMNZ)	40
Singapore (RIAS)	9
South Korea (Gaon)	90
US World Digital Songs (Billboard)	6

== Certifications and sales ==
Certifications and sales figures for We Boom
Region	Certification	Certified units/sales
South Korea (KMCA)	2× Platinum	506,569

== Accolades ==
Awards and nominations
Year	Award	Category	Result	Ref.
2020	34th Golden Disc Awards	Album Bonsang	Won	
2020	34th Golden Disc Awards	Album Daesang	Nominated	

Music program awards
Song	Program	Date	Ref.
"Boom"	The Show	August 6, 2019	
"Boom"	The Show	August 20, 2019	

== Release history ==
Region	Date	Format	Label
Various	July 26, 2019	Digital download; streaming	SM
South Korea	July 26, 2019	Digital download; streaming	SM
South Korea	July 29, 2019	CD	SM
