= We Young (EP) =

EP by NCT Dream
- Released: August 17, 2017
- Recorded: 2017
- Studios: SM Studios, Seoul, South Korea
- Genres: Tropical house; Funk; dance-pop
- Length: 20:39
- Languages: Korean; Mandarin
- Labels: SM; Genie
- Producer: Lee Soo-man (exec.)

NCT Dream chronology
The First (2017)	We Young (2017)	We Go Up (2018)

NCT chronology
Cherry Bomb (2017)	We Young (2017)	NCT 2018 Empathy (2018)

Singles from We Young
- 1. "Trigger The Fever" Released: March 15, 2017; 2. "We Young" Released: August 17, 2017

We Young is the first EP of South Korean boy band NCT Dream, the third sub-unit of the South Korean boy band NCT. It was released by S.M. Entertainment on August 17, 2017 and distributed by Genie Music. The mini-album includes a total of six tracks. This was the second and final album release not to include Jaemin due to his medical hiatus.

== Concept ==
The lead single, "We Young" is an up-tempo dance number of tropical house genre. The album contains five other songs, "La La Love", "Walk You Home", "My Page", "Trigger the Fever", and the Chinese version of "We Young" which revolves around the theme of young love and other problems teens face.

== Promotion ==
NCT Dream held their comeback showcase on August 16, 2017 at Gyeonggi-do Ilsan Hyundai Motor Studio Goyang; where they held their first stage of the title song "We Young". The unit had their first comeback stage on M Countdown.

== Track listing ==
We Young
No.	Title	Lyrics	Music	Arrangement	Length
1.	"We Young"	Kenzie	Kenzie; LDN Noise; Ylva Dimberg (The Kennel)	LDN Noise	3:44
2.	"La La Love"	Shin Agnes (MonoTree); Mark	David Amber; Noel Aram Cohen; Devyn Rush	David Amber	3:01
3.	"Walk You Home" (Korean: 같은 시간 같은 자리; RR: Gateun sigan gateun jari; lit. 'Same Time, Same Place')	Seo Ji-eum; Mark	David Fremberg; Onestar (MonoTree); Allison Kaplan	David Fremberg	2:55
4.	"My Page"	Min Yeon-jae; Mark	Coach & Sendo; Andrew Choi	Coach & Sendo; Andrew Choi	3:46
5.	"We Young (Chinese Version)" (Chinese: 青春漾; pinyin: Qīngchūn Yàng; lit. 'The Ripples of Youth')	Wang Jung-woon	Kenzie; LDN Noise; Ylva Dimberg (The Kennel)	LDN Noise	3:44
6.	"Trigger The Fever" (Bonus Track)	100% Lyricism; Hwang Ji-won; Mark	David Amber; Andy Love; Hitchhiker	David Amber; Hitchhiker	3:26
Total length:					20:36

== Charts ==
=== Weekly charts ===
Chart (2017–2023)	Peak position
Croatian International Albums (HDU)	33
French Digital Albums (SNEP)	43
South Korean Albums (Gaon)	2
US World Albums (Billboard)	3

== Release history ==
Region	Date	Format	Label
South Korea	August 17, 2017	CD, digital download	S.M. Entertainment; Genie Music
Various	August 17, 2017	Digital download	S.M. Entertainment; Genie Music
