= We Go Up (NCT Dream EP) =

EP by NCT Dream
- Released: September 3, 2018
- Recorded: 2018
- Studios: SM Studios, Seoul, South Korea
- Genres: K-pop; hip hop; dance-pop; electropop; R&B
- Length: 19:00
- Languages: Korean; Mandarin
- Labels: SM Entertainment; iriver

NCT Dream chronology
We Young (2017)	We Go Up (2018)	We Boom (2019)

NCT chronology
Chain (2018)	We Go Up (2018)	Regular-Irregular (2018)

Singles from We Go Up
- 1. "We Go Up" Released: September 3, 2018

We Go Up is the second extended play by South Korean–Chinese boy band NCT Dream, the third and teen-aged sub-unit of the South Korean boy band NCT. Released by SM Entertainment on September 3, 2018 and distributed by iriver, the album contains five new Korean songs and a Mandarin version of the album's eponymous single, marking it their latest release to contain a Mandarin record. The extended play was the unit's first major release to feature member Jaemin since their debut single "Chewing Gum" in August 2016; following his medical hiatus since early 2017. SM founder Lee Soo-man served as the EP's executive producer, with songwriters and producers such as Kenzie, MZMC, Bazzi, Mike Woods, Kevin White, August Rigo, The Stereotypes, Deez, Erik Lidbom, Cazzi Opeia, Anton Ewald, Simon Johansson, Sebastian Thott, and others participating in making the album. It was also their last release with the original seven-member lineup, marking the graduation of member Mark in December 2018 as he reached the age of adulthood in South Korea.

Upon its release, We Go Up enjoyed commercial success in both NCT Dream's native country and several international component charts. It was the unit's second chart-topper on the Gaon Album Chart, following their 2017 release The First, and eventually their first charting entry in Japan and United Kingdom, peaking at number eleven and ninety-seven on the Oricon Albums Chart and the Album Downloads component chart, respectively. The extended play also attained success in the United States, becoming their second top-five entry on the Billboard World Albums chart, peaking at number five on its first charting week. The group went on to promote the extended play's eponymous lead single through various South Korean television music programs, and has since performed the title track on all of their headlining concerts, namely The Dream Show and their Beyond LIVE concert in May 2020.

== Background and release ==
Originally debuted as a septet in August 2016 with the digital single "Chewing Gum", NCT Dream actively promoted as a sextet instead since February 1, 2017 due to member Jaemin's medical hiatus. Jaemin eventually rejoined the unit for their parental group's 2018 project Empathy single, titled "Go", which saw the group transitioning from their "youthful" image to a more "rebellious" and "defiant" approach in both music and image. SM Entertainment eventually announced the group would release a new extended play in September 2018, later revealed to be We Go Up. The label further stated that member Mark would "graduate" from the unit following the EP's release in December 2018, due to him turning 19 by the time, thus reaching the age of adulthood in South Korea. An accompanying music video for the eponymous lead single was released on 30 August 2018, four days prior to the extended play's release. The EP's package came in a singular version with a CD containing all six songs, a photo booklet and several collectibles for fans.

== Composition ==
We Go Up contains five new songs recorded in Korean by the unit, while its eponymous track received a Mandarin version as the closing track. The lead single "We Go Up" is described as a "retro vibe", urban hip hop track that saw the members singing about team spirit, containing "tinny" percussion and "booming" bass line along with the group "serv[ing] up swaggering raps and harmonious vocals". It was written by SM songwriter Kenzie and member Mark, whom went on to co-write three additional tracks in the album, while the former also worked with producer MZMC, singer-songwriter Bazzi, Mike Woods, and Kevin White on the song's production. Along with Mark, member Jeno, Jaemin and Jisung also took part in writing the lyrics for "Dear Dream", a hip-hop and pop song that memorizes the graduation of Mark from the sub-unit. The unit also worked with American production team The Stereotypes and Canadian musician August Rigo on the track "1, 2, 3", a funky R&B and dance-pop track that sings about falling for a new crush.

== Chart performance ==
The album entered Billboard's World Albums chart at No. 5, and Heatseekers Albums chart at No.7; which marks NCT Dream's best sales week in America to date.

== NCT Dream Show ==
NCT Dream Show was NCT Dream's music variety show. It focused on NCT’s concept, which is sympathizing through dreaming and becoming one through music.

=== First Show ===
Date	City	Country	Venue
September 28, 2018	Seoul	South Korea	SMTOWN Coex Artium, SMTOWN Theatre
September 29, 2018	Seoul	South Korea	SMTOWN Coex Artium, SMTOWN Theatre
September 30, 2018	Seoul	South Korea	SMTOWN Coex Artium, SMTOWN Theatre

=== Second Show ===
Date	City	Country	Venue
December 1, 2018	Seoul	South Korea	SMTOWN Coex Artium, SMTOWN Theatre
December 2, 2018	Seoul	South Korea	SMTOWN Coex Artium, SMTOWN Theatre
December 3, 2018	Seoul	South Korea	SMTOWN Coex Artium, SMTOWN Theatre
December 4, 2018	Seoul	South Korea	SMTOWN Coex Artium, SMTOWN Theatre
December 5, 2018	Seoul	South Korea	SMTOWN Coex Artium, SMTOWN Theatre

== Track listing ==
We Go Up track listing
No.	Title	Lyrics	Music	Arrangement	Length
1.	"We Go Up"	Kenzie; Mark	MZMC; Andrew Bazzi (Rice N' Peas); Mike Woods (Rice N' Peas); Kevin White (Rice N' Peas); Kenzie	Rice N' Peas	3:03
2.	"1, 2, 3"	Hwang Yoo-bin	August Rigo; The Stereotypes	The Stereotypes	3:01
3.	"Beautiful Time" (Korean: 너와 나; RR: Neowa na; lit. 'You and Me')	Seo Ji-eum; Kim In-ha; Mark	Michael Lee Cheung (MLC); Erik Lidbom	Erik Lidbom	3:27
4.	"Drippin'"	Jeon Ji-eun (January 8th (lalala Studio)); Hwang Seon-jeong (January 8th (lalala Studio)); Kim Jeong-mi (January 8th (lalala Studio)); Mark	Jonatan Gusmark (Moonshine); Ludvig Evers (Moonshine); Deez; Cazzi Opeia (Sunshine)	Moonshine	3:17
5.	"Dear Dream"	Baek Geum-min (Song Carat); Lee Soo-jung (Song Carat); Jisung; Jaemin; Jeno; Mark	Anton Ewald; Simon Johansson; Sebastian Thott	Sebastian Thott	3:09
6.	"We Go Up" (Chinese version; Chinese: 青春接力; pinyin: Qīngchūn Jiēlì; lit. 'Youth Relay')	Zhou Weijie	MZMC; Andrew Bazzi (Rice N' Peas); Mike Woods (Rice N' Peas); Kevin White (Rice N' Peas); Kenzie	Rice N' Peas	3:03
Total length:					19:00

== Charts ==
=== Weekly charts ===
Weekly chart performance for We Go Up
Chart (2018)	Peak position
Japanese Albums (Oricon)	11
Japanese Hot Albums (Billboard)	28
South Korean Albums (Gaon)	1
UK Download Albums (OCC)	97
US Heatseekers Album (Billboard)	7
US World Albums (Billboard)	5

=== Year-end charts ===
Year-end chart performance for We Go Up
Chart (2018)	Position
South Korean Albums (Gaon)	22

== Certifications ==
Certifications for We Go Up
Region	Certification	Certified units/sales
South Korea (KMCA)	Platinum	250,000^{^}
^{^} Shipments figures based on certification alone.

== Release history ==
Release history and formats for We Go Up
Region	Date	Format	Label
South Korea	September 3, 2018	CD, digital download	SM Entertainment; iRIVER
Various	September 3, 2018	Digital download	SM Entertainment; iRIVER
