= Chenle =

Chinese singer and actor (born 2001)

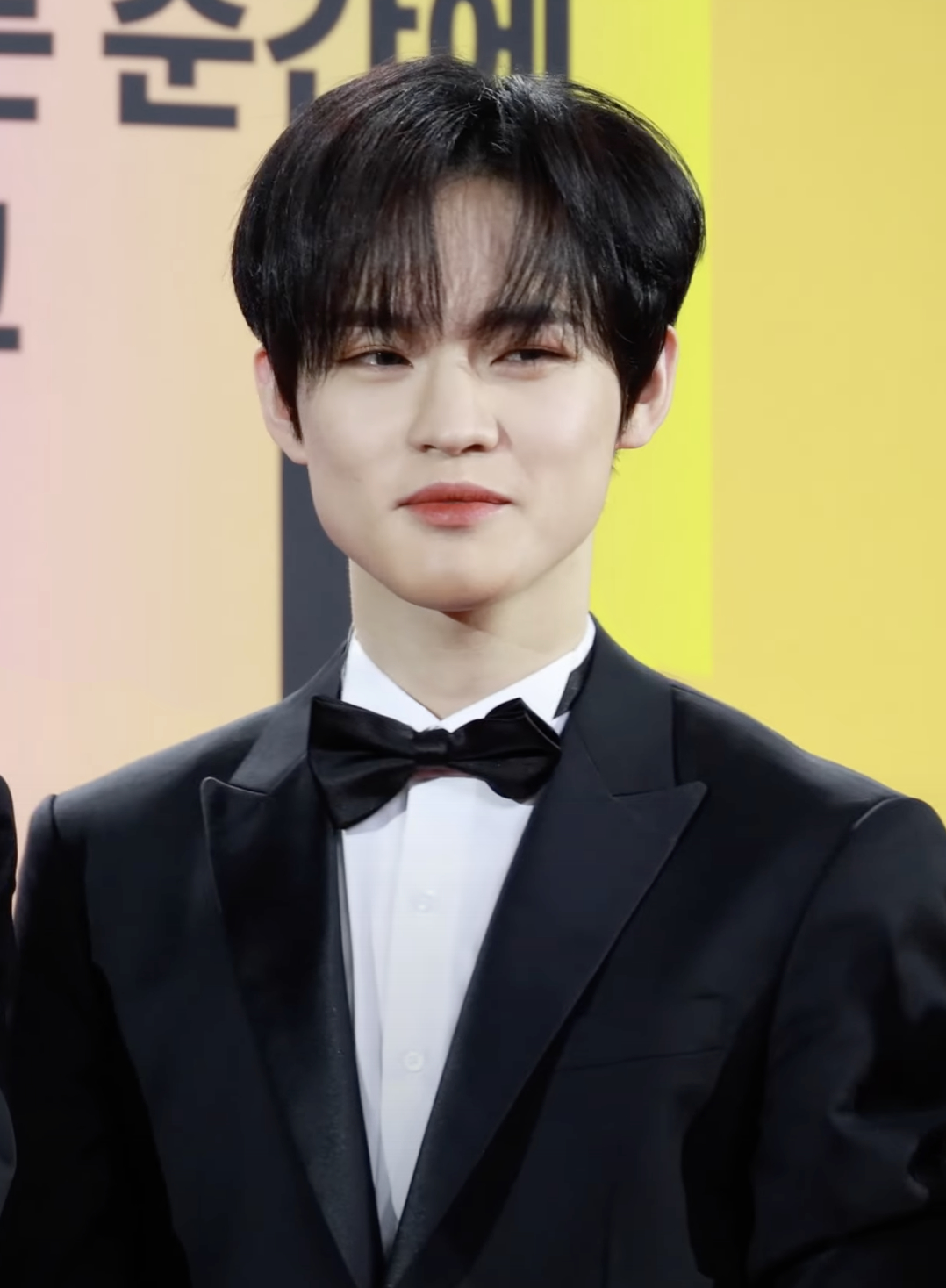
- Chenle in 2023 Melon Music Awards
- Born: Zhong Chenle; 22 November 2001 (age 25); Shanghai, China
- Occupations: Singer; actor
- Years active: 2009–present
- Musical career
- Genres: K-pop; Mandopop; children's
- Instruments: Vocals; piano
- Labels: Lin Teng Culture Media; SM; TME
- Member of: NCT; NCT Dream; SM Town
- Formerly of: 0090; Zeke & The Kiddos
- Website: Official website

Chinese name
- Traditional Chinese: 鍾辰樂
- Simplified Chinese: 钟辰乐
Transcriptions
Standard Mandarin
- Hanyu Pinyin: Zhōng Chénlè
Southern Min
- Hokkien POJ: Chiong sîn-ga̍k

Signature
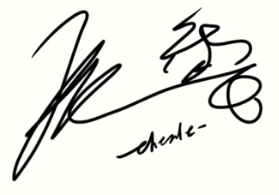

Zhong Chenle (Chinese: 钟辰乐; born 22 November 2001), known mononymously as Chenle (Korean: 천러), is a Chinese singer and former child actor based in South Korea. Chenle began his career as a child singer, having performed in various concerts and television shows in China and abroad. At age nine, he became the youngest singer to be invited to perform solo at the Golden Hall of Vienna. Through his solo career, Chenle has released three albums and hosted one concert in China. At the age of fourteen, Chenle signed with South Korean entertainment company SM Entertainment and subsequently moved to South Korea in 2016 to debut as a member of the South Korean boy band NCT through its fixed sub-unit NCT Dream, which has gone on to become one of the best-selling boy groups in South Korea.

== Early life and education ==
Zhong Chenle was born in Shanghai, China on 22 November 2001. He has an older brother by 13 years. He attended Shangwen Middle School before moving to Korea. He was later enrolled at the Beijing Contemporary Music School, graduating as part of the class of 2020.

In 2006, Chenle entered the Shanghai Ying Siu Sing School and attended dance classes. In 2008, he was admitted to the Shanghai Little Star Art Troupe and studied vocal music under Huang Jing.

== Career ==
=== 2009–2015: Early solo career in China ===
In 2009, Chenle participated in the Haha children's channel held by Yueyue Elf Vs Season Trial, where he was runner-up and won the Elf Genie Award. Chenle first rose to prominence in 2010 participating in China's Got Talent, performing the song "Memory" from Andrew Lloyd Webber's musical Cats. In 2010, he participated in the National Chinese Young Talent Selection and won a gold medal. In 2010, Chenle made television appearances as part of the duo 0090, made up of himself and Xu Zehui, both coming from the Shanghai Little Star Art Troupe.

In September 2010, Chenle signed a record deal with Lin Teng Culture Media. He released three albums under the label.

On 25 January 2011, at age nine, Chenle was invited to perform at the Chinese New Year concert held at Golden Hall of Vienna; at the time, he was the youngest singer to have performed as a soloist at the venue. In June, Chenle played the co-lead role in the children's musical Joy of Growing Up, alongside fellow China's Got Talent auditionee Zhang Aiqing. On 16 June, Chenle led the audience in singing the Chinese national anthem at the second Nie Er Music Week opening ceremony in the Shanghai Grand Theater. In July, Chenle released his twelve-track second solo album, My Wings. At the end of the month and in August, he participated in the opening and closing ceremonies of the Shanghai International Children's Art Festival on the Shanghai Grand Stage at the Shanghai International Convention Center.

In December 2012, Chenle participated in the First Plenary Session of the Huangpu District of Shanghai and was elected as the district director for the Young Pioneers.

In 2013, Chenle participated in the first season of Let's Sing Kids, as part of Yang Zongwei's team. His first known minor acting role was in 2013, when he featured in Chinese drama The Queen of SOP 2 at age 11.

In 2014, Chenle held his first solo concert, Music With You, at the Shanghai Concert Hall. He consequently released his concert album, of the same name, Music With You, that same year. Chenle joined the World Organization of Rising Leading Diplomats, headquartered in Washington, D.C., founded and presided over by pianist-songwriter-producer Ezekiel Palmieri, representing China as a young cultural diplomat. He served as Chinese Ambassador at an international multicultural show created by Palmieri at the Teatro Coliseo, Buenos Aires on 15 and 16 August 2014; he performed "The Dragon's Romance", a song Palmieri wrote specifically for him.

Throughout 2015, Chenle would participate as a performing member of the "Chinese Cultural Paradise" outstanding student troupe, visiting multiple countries including South Korea, Japan, Australia and New Zealand.

During his time as a child entertainer in China he would record and perform many cover songs, including many from Declan Galbraith.

=== 2016–2024: Debut with NCT and NCT Dream ===
After being given a casting offer by SM Entertainment in 2015, Chenle signed to SM Entertainment in March 2016. In August 2016, at age 14, Chenle would make his debut as a member of NCT Dream, a sub-unit of NCT.

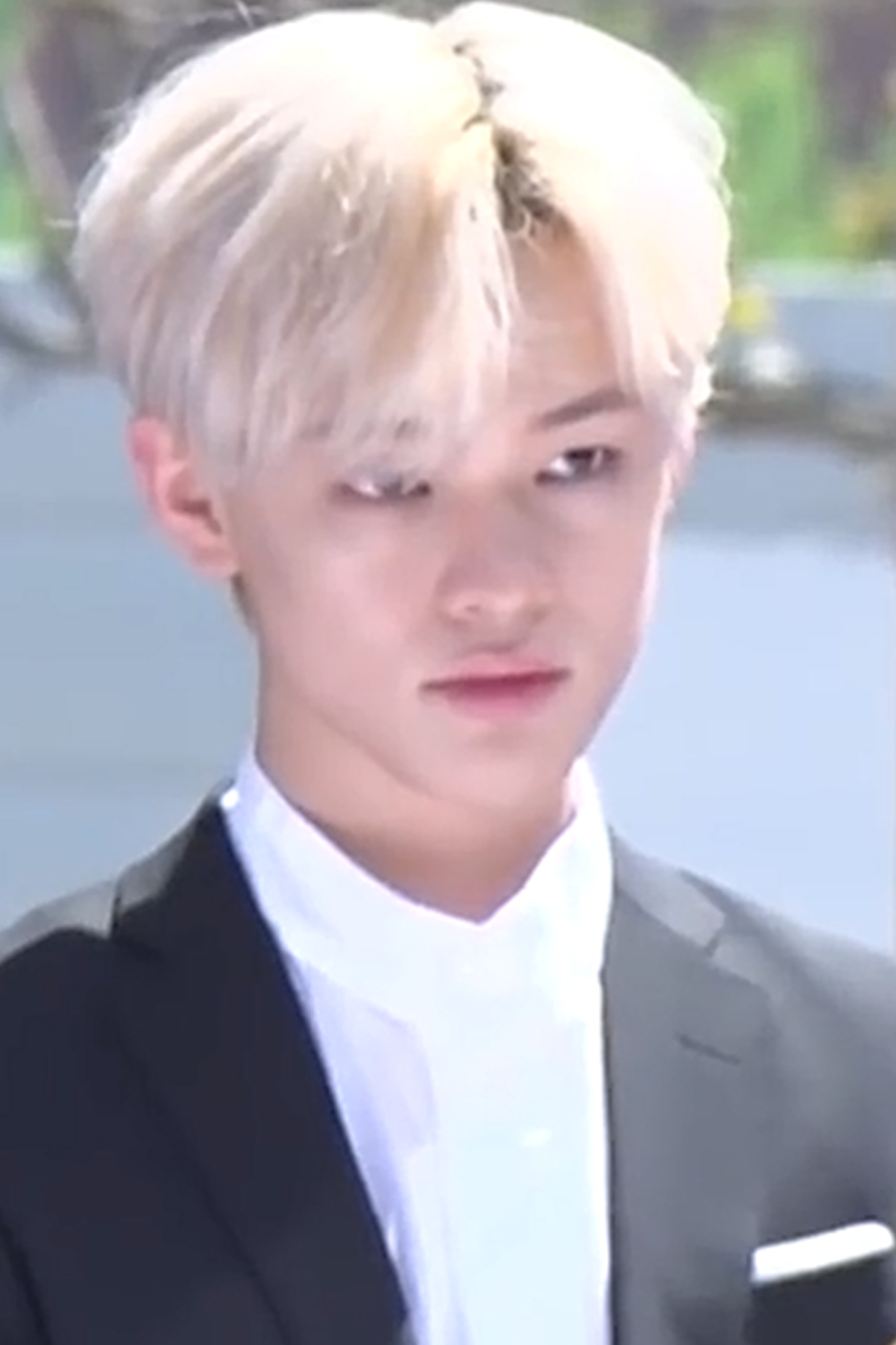
Chenle in 2019

Since December 2018, Chenle with fellow NCT Dream member Jisung have hosted the NCT YouTube series CHENLE & JISUNG's This and That.

On 20 May 2020, Chenle and Renjun's graduation song "A New Beginning" was released by Beijing Contemporary Music Academy on Chinese sites. Chenle hosted TBS eFM 101.3 MHz's Yuedong Seoul, a Chinese-language radio show, from 12 October 2020 to 12 September 2021. Chenle's NCT U debut was marked by the release of NCT's two-part second studio album, NCT 2020 Resonance, featuring on the single "From Home".

In February 2021, Chenle featured on the song "Too Good" from IMLAY's fourth EP Utopia. In March 2022 it was announced that Chenle had suffered an ankle injury in the run-up to NCT Dream's Glitch Mode promotions, which he ultimately chose to participate in in a limited capacity. On 6 December 2023, Chenle released his first self-produced song "Marine Turtle" by NCT U as part of the NCT Lab project. In January 2024, Chenle participated in "Do It (Let's Play)", the official theme song for the NCT Zone mobile game, with fellow NCT members Jungwoo, Xiaojun, Jeno, and Yangyang. On 31 May 2024, it was announced that Chenle would be participating in the OST for the Chinese drama The Double, with the ending theme, "Live and Love".

=== 2025–present: Lucid ===
In April 2025, it was announced that Chenle would be releasing his first solo project in over a decade with the EP, Lucid, on 5 May 2025. Chenle released a remake of Wu Bai & China Blue's "Tear Bridge" as a pre-release single for the EP, on 28 April. The EP and its singles were originally released exclusively on TME's network of music streaming platforms in China. The EP topped the QQ Music Digital Album Chart during the pre-order and release period. Chenle debuted "Lucid" at Tianjin's Bubbling & Boiling Music & Arts Festival, on 2 May. He held an exclusive showcase for the EP in Beijing on 17 May.

In October 2026, Chenle collaborated with his bandmate Jisung to release the single "Smash It" for the soundtrack of the second season of Crash.

== Other activities ==
=== Philanthropy ===
In May 2017, Chenle together with fellow NCT Dream member Renjun volunteered with CJ Dream Classroom in Nanjing. CJ Dream Classroom in Nanjing is part of a global social contribution program providing better cultural arts education opportunities for children of Chinese labourers.

=== Endorsements ===
Chenle was announced as a "Friend of Chagee", in April 2025, as part of the release of the tea chain's hojicha genmai signature drink.

== Personal life ==
=== Interests ===
Chenle enjoys cooking. In 2019, he went viral for his instant ramen recipe, coined by the Korean media as "Chenle Ramen" and has also been covered by international outlets. The viral recipe which includes the addition of Lao Gan Ma sauce, has been seen as being part of a mala trend in Korea. He has been a supporter of the Golden State Warriors since 2016.

== Discography ==
=== Studio albums ===
List of studio albums, with selected details
Title	Details
Tomorrow	Released: 2010; Label: Lin Teng Culture Media; Format: CD; Track listing: 1. "Party" (郊遊); 2. "Let's Show" (海寶); 3. "Tomorrow"; 4. "巧克力王"; 5. "蝴蝶飞呀"; 6. "練字謠"; 7. "夢的眼睛"; 8. "輪滑小將"; 9. "Edelweiss" (雪絨花; with Huang Jing); 10. "I Just Can't Wait to Be King" (等我長大來當王); 11. "最美的畫"; 12. "Tell Me Why"; 13. "最好的未来"; 14. "夢的眼睛" (Instrumental); 15. "Party" (郊遊; instrumental)
My Wings	Released: June 2011; Label: Lin Teng Culture Media; Format: CD, DVD; Track listing: 1. "Memory"; 2. "我的翅膀"; 3. "You Raise Me Up"; 4. "蝸牛"; 5. "It All Begins With Love"; 6. "Tell Me Why"; 7. "和你在一起"; 8. "閃亮全世界"; 9. "Danny Boy"; 10. "蝴蝶飛呀"; 11. "Twinkle, Twinkle, Little Star"; 12. "Music Boy"

=== Live albums ===
List of live albums, with selected details
Title	Details
Music with You	Released: October 2014; Label: Lin Teng Culture Media; Format: CD, DVD; Track listing: 1. "Memory"; 2. "最好的未來" (with Huang Jing); 3. "和你在一起" (with Xu Zehui); 4. Medley of The Joy of Growing Up (with Zhang Aiqing); 5. "Speak Softly Love" (with Xiao Wei); 6. "蝸牛"; 7. "可惜不是你"; 8. "Hey Jude"; 9. "风吹麦浪" (with Niu Xinxin); 10. "闪亮全世界" (with Wu Qian); 11. "雪人" (with Gu Zhe); 12. "坚强的孩子" (with Li Jianhui); 13. "爱的代价" (Li Jianhui solo); 14. "Goodbye"; 15. "One Voice"; 16. "喜歡上海話" (Zhang Zhilin solo); 17. "Tell Me Why"; 18. "我的翅膀" (Behind-the-scenes footage of the film Heart Curved); 19. "Music Boy"; 20. "燭光裡的媽媽"; 21. "父親"; 22. "乐有你在"

=== Extended plays ===
List of extended plays, with selected details
Title	Details
Lucid (灿)	Released: 5 May 2025; Label: Tencent Music, SM; Formats: Digital download, streaming; Track listing: 1. "Tear Bridge" (泪桥); 2. "Lucid" (灿); 3. "Cosmic Joke" (宇宙的笑话; featuring Bibi Zhou)

=== Singles ===
List of singles as lead artist, with year of release, selected chart positions, and associated album
Title	Year	Peak chart positions	Album
Title	Year	CHN	Album
"I Also Have a Chinese Dream" (我也有个中国梦) (with Su Yuhan, Yang Yiyuan, Chen Sini, Zhou Zhangchi, and Wu Qian)	2014	—	Non-album single
"Tear Bridge" (泪桥)	2025	9	Lucid
"Lucid" (灿)	2025	28	Lucid
"Hot Rice & Warm Soup" (热汤浓饭) (with Renjun, Chen Bochuan, and Gu Deleke)	2026	—	Non-album single
"Fly Away"	2026	TBA	Non-album single

=== Promotional singles ===
List of promotional singles, with year of release and associated album
Title	Year	Album
"Live and Love" (活下去爱下去)	2024	The Double
"Smash It" (천지 콤비) (with Jisung)	2026	Non-album single

=== Other charted songs ===
List of other charted songs, with year of release, selected chart positions, and associated album
Title	Year	Peak chart positions		Album
Title	Year	CHN	KOR DL	Album
"Snow Dream 2021" (with Yeri, Haechan, Jisung, and Ningning)	2021	—	83	2021 Winter SM Town: SMCU Express
"Where You Are" (넌 어디에) (with Ryeowook, Onew, Doyoung, and Xiaojun)	2022	—	87	2022 Winter SM Town: SMCU Palace
"Cosmic Joke" (宇宙的笑话) (featuring Bibi Zhou)	2025	99	—	Lucid
"—" denotes a recording that did not chart or was not released in that territory.

=== Writing credits ===
Key
Indicates songs in which writers are credited specifically for the Korean lyrics

List of songs by name, with credited artist(s), lyricist(s), composer(s), associated album, and year of release
Title	Artist(s)	Lyricist(s)	Composer(s)	Album	Year	Ref.
"A New Beginning" (新的开始)	Chenle and Renjun	Renjun; Chenle		Non-album single	2020	
"Like We Just Met"	NCT Dream	Mark; Renjun; Jeno; Haechan; Jaemin; Chenle; Jisung	Allegro; Dan Johnson; Robbie Jay; Mark; Jeno; Jaemin	ISTJ	2023	
"Marine Turtle" (蓝洋海龟)	NCT U	Jenny Wang	Mingtion; Chenle	Non-album single	2023	
"Marine Turtle" (Korean version)	NCT U	Mingtion; Mark; Junny	Mingtion; Chenle	Non-album single	2023	

=== Music videos ===
Title	Year
"My Wings" (我的翅膀)	c. 2011
"Don't Be Afraid" (不要怕) (with Li Zewei and Liu Bo)	2012
"You Raise Me Up" (with Li Zewei and Liu Bo)	2013
"The Wind That Shakes the Barley" (风吹麦浪) (with Niu Xinxin)	2013
"Lucid" (灿)	2025

== Filmography ==
=== Film ===
Year	Title	Role	Notes	Ref.
2013	Soul Rhythm (靈魂的節奏)	Fu Xiaojun		
2014	A Candy for Mother (掌心的糖果)	LeLe	Short film	

=== Television ===
Year	Title	Role	Notes	Ref.
2009	Yinyue Elf Vocal Season Selection Competition (音悦精灵声乐赛季选拔赛)	Contestant		
2010	China's Got Talent	Contestant	Season 1, featured during the auditions round.	
2012	Talented Children's Voice (天才童声)	Contestant		
2012	Childlike Innocence Hits the Earth (童心撞地球)	DuoDuo		
2012	Sound One Team (天声一队)	Regular		
2013	The Queen of SOP 2 (勝女的代價2)	Xiao Nan	Episodes 1 & 17	
2013	Bund Police (外滩警事)	Yiming	Episode 22	
2013	Super Voice (超级童声)	Judge		
2013	Let's Sing Kids (中国新声代)	Contestant	Season 1	
2026	Voices of Youth (超燃青春的合唱)	Contestant		
2026	Idol's Table (아이돌스테이블)	Panelist		

=== Radio ===
Year	Title	Role	Ref.
2020–2021	Yuedong Seoul	Host	

== Concerts and live performances ==
=== Concerts ===
- Music With You (2014)

=== Theatre ===
Year	Title	Native Title	Role	Venue	Notes	Ref.
2010	Happy Childhood	快乐童年	Unknown	Unknown	Musical	
2011	Joy of Growing Up	成长的快乐	Forest Prince	Shanghai Children's Art Theatre	Musical	
2014	Wunderkindz		Lele	Teatro Coliseo	Musical, performing as part of Zeke & The Kiddos	

== Awards and nominations ==
Name of the award ceremony, year presented, award category, nominee(s) of the award, and the result of the nomination
Award ceremony	Year	Category	Nominee / Work	Result	Ref.
Tencent Music Entertainment Awards	2025	Breakthrough Trending Artist of the Year	Himself	Won	
Weibo Music Awards	2023	Recommended Popular Artist of the Year	Himself	Won	

Other awards and accolades
Year	Award	Nominee / Work	Result	Ref.
2009	Yueyue Elf Vs Season Trial "Elf Genie Award"	Himself	Won	
2010	National Outstanding Students Competition	Himself	Won	
2010	National Award For Young Talents in China	Himself	Won	
2012	Director for Huangpu District Young Pioneers	Himself	Won	
2025	TME Wave Chart (May)	"Cosmic Joke" (宇宙的笑话) (feat. Bibi Zhou)	Twelfth	
2025	TME Best Performing EP (Mid Year Report)	Lucid (灿)	Ninth	
