= Hot Sauce (NCT Dream album) =

- Digital and jewel case version cover

Studio album by NCT Dream
- Released: May 10, 2021
- Recorded: 2021
- Studio: SM Studio Center (Seoul)
- Genres: K-pop; R&B; hip hop
- Length: 35:09
- Language: Korean
- Label: SM

NCT Dream chronology
Reload (2020)	Hot Sauce (2021)	Glitch Mode (2022)

NCT chronology
Kick Back (2021)	Hot Sauce (2021)	Sticker (2021)

Singles from Hot Sauce
- 1. "Hot Sauce" Released: May 10, 2021

Repackage edition cover
- Digital and repackaged cover

Singles from Hello Future
- 1. "Hello Future" Released: June 28, 2021

Professional ratings
Review scores
Source	Rating
IZM	3.5/5 stars
NME	4/5 stars

Hot Sauce is the first studio album by South Korean boy band NCT Dream, the third sub-unit of the South Korean boy band NCT. It was released on May 10, 2021, through SM Entertainment. Following their previous EP, Reload, this album marks NCT Dream's first release to feature back as a seven-member unit following the return of Mark from the termination of the age-based graduation system that was operated in the group. Hot Sauce is one of the best-selling albums in South Korea.

The album was repackaged as Hello Future on June 28, featuring 3 new tracks, including the lead single of the same name.

== Background and release ==
On May 10, NCT Dream released their first studio album, Hot Sauce, which marked the group's first full album release as a 7-member unit since 2018 and the first full-length album after nearly a five-year career.

== Composition ==
The title track "Hot Sauce" is described as a hip-hop song laid over an afrobeat. The contrast of the unique chanting in the chorus helps the otherwise minimalist track to stand out. The album's first b-side track, "Diggity" is a pop dance song with a groovy beat and a refreshing chorus. In addition, "Dive Into You" is a song featuring band instruments with an attractive contrast between an emotional melody and a sense of speed. As a sound-based mid-tempo R&B pop song, the lyrics express the relationship between "me and you" symbolized by the whale and the sea, vividly expressing the desire to fall deeply into your arms as a whale swims in the sea. "My Youth" is an upbeat R&B pop song that harmonizes the members' lyrical chorus with a tempo-sensory 8-beat rhythm. The lyrics expressing gratitude for the beautifully shining season are impressive, recalling the pure emotions and memories generously given to each other. "Rocket" is a retro pop song with an attractive atmosphere created by the funky rhythmic Rhodes keyboard and organ sound. The lyrics expressed as 'Dream Rocket' contain the aspiration to take a bigger leap forward, using the universe as a stage. "Countdown (3, 2, 1)" is a pop dance song that stands out with an intense 808 bass and an addictive trap beat chorus. The lyrics describe suppressed dreams exploding out of the world, becoming bigger, impressive dreams. NCT Dream's "ANL", with its unique refreshing charm, has a popping lead synth sound and brass. It is a synth pop song with a harmonious session. Like the moon floating in the night sky every day, the lyrics that metaphorically express the thoughts toward the other person that keeps rising in the head add to the joy of listening. "Irreplaceable" contains a vintage keyboard sound, percussion instrument, brass, etc. A medium-tempo song with a swing rhythm that harmonizes the lively instruments with the lyrics, it tells of the preciousness of you, who cannot be replaced by anything else, doubling the excitement of the song. The album's penultimate track, "Be There For You" is a ballad song sung by Haechan, Renjun and Chenle, whose voices stand out with light and emotional vocals over the smooth piano melody that leads the whole song. With its acoustic guitar sound and rich harmony of chorus, it creates a warm atmosphere with lyrics that convey the sincerity that you want to always be with the members. The final track, "Rainbow", is an R&B pop song with a comfortable guitar sound that leads the song. With the members' sincere vocals added to this album, expressed by comparing this album to a book with bookmarks, and a message that the seven members create a new page together like a beautiful rainbow, members Mark, Jeno, Jaemin and Jisung participated in writing the rap lyrics, adding an extra layer of authenticity.

== Reception ==
=== Critical reception ===
Harper's Bazaar included the album at number 5 in their list of the 15 best K-pop albums of 2021. The single "Hello Future" was ranked among the best K-pop songs of the year by various publications, including Paper (1st), South China Morning Post (13th), Tonplein (21st), and CNN Philippines. Teen Vogue included its music video in their list of the best K-pop videos of the year.

=== Commercial performance ===
On May 9, the album exceeded more than 1.71 million copies in pre-orders, setting a new record as SM Entertainment's highest pre-orders album of all time. It officially sold a million copies on the first week of release according to the Hanteo chart. The group achieved four number ones on Gaon Chart as Hot Sauce ranked first on the Album chart while the lead single of the same name topped the Digital, Download and BGM charts. On May 26, the album sold more than 2 million copies.

== Promotion ==
From April 17 to May 7, the group was featured in the travel entertainment series 7llin in the Dream, posted on their official YouTube channel to officially begin promotions as a 7-member group. On the day of the album and music video release, the group hosted a live broadcast on Naver's V Live to discuss about the album. On May 11, the group held a comeback show that was broadcast through various online platforms such as YouTube, V Live, Twitter and TikTok. The show included performances of tracks from Hot Sauce, as well as 7-member version of their previous singles "Boom" and "Ridin'". NCT Dream promoted the album on various South Korean music programs. On May 13, the group made their first music show appearance on M Countdown by performing the tracks "Dive Into You" and "Hot Sauce" and was followed by performances in Music Bank, Show! Music Core and Inkigayo in the same week. They earned their first music show trophy for "Hot Sauce" on the May 19th episode of Show Champion and achieved a total of eight trophies by the end of the promotions.

== Track listing ==
맛 (Hot Sauce) track listing
No.	Title	Lyrics	Music	Arrangement	Length
1.	"Hot Sauce" (맛; Mat; 'Flavour')	Moon Yeo-reum; Jo Yoon-kyung	Martin Wave; Tinashe Sibanda; Philip Kembo; Rosina "Soaky Siren" Russell; John Mitchell; Ninos Hanna; Yoo Young-jin	Martin Wave; Bantu; Dr. Chaii; Yoo Young-jin	3:15
2.	"Diggity"	Kenzie	Kenzie; Jonatan Gusmark; Ludvig Evers; Moa "Cazzi Opeia" Carlebecker	Moonshine	3:29
3.	"Dive into You" (고래; Gorae; 'Whale')	Ellie Suh (153/Joombas)	David Wilson; Wyatt Sanders; James Abrahart	Dwilly	3:12
4.	"My Youth" (우리의 계절; Uriui gyejeol; 'Our season')	Lee Ji-yoon	David Wilson; Wyatt Sanders; Scott Effman	Dwilly	3:56
5.	"Rocket"	Jo Yoon-kyung	Jonatan Gusmark; Ludvig Evers; Stephan Benson (Misunderstood); Jeffrey Okyere-Twumasi (Misunderstood); Realmeee	Moonshine	2:55
6.	"Countdown (3, 2, 1)"	Jang Jeong-won; Rick Bridges	Jonatan Gusmark; Ludvig Evers; Deez; Bobii Lewis; Rick Bridges; Supreme Boi; Slow Rabbit	Moonshine	3:34
7.	"ANL"	Jane; Ron; Grizzly; Daegam (Cracker); E.Do (Cracker); Junny; Aisle	No2zcat; Aisle; Junny; Ron	No2zcat	3:45
8.	"Irreplaceable" (주인공; Juingong; 'Hero')	Cho Ah-young (153/Joombas); Rick Bridges	Deez; The Family; Rick Bridges	Deez	3:24
9.	"Be There for You" (지금처럼만; Jigeumcheoreomman; 'Just like now') (Sung by Renjun, Haechan & Chenle)	MinGtion; Junny	MinGtion; Junny	MinGtion	3:43
10.	"Rainbow" (책갈피; Chaekgalpi; 'Bookmark')	Jo Yoon-kyung; Mark; Jeno; Jaemin; Jisung	Jurek Reunamäki; Rik Annema; Cimo Fränkel; Annie Schindel; Griff Clawson	Jurek Reunamäki	3:51
Total length:					35:09

Hello Future track listing
No.	Title	Lyrics	Music	Arrangement	Length
1.	"Hello Future"	Kenzie	Kenzie; Jonatan Gusmark; Ludvig Evers; Adrian McKinnon	Moonshine	3:40
2.	"Bungee"	Kenzie	Kenzie; Jonatan Gusmark; Ludvig Evers; Stephan Benson	Moonshine	3:28
3.	"Hot Sauce" (맛; Mat; 'Flavour')	Moon Yeo-reum; Jo Yoon-kyung	Martin Wave; Tinashe Sibanda; Philip Kembo; Rosina "Soaky Siren" Russell; John Mitchell; Ninos Hanna; Yoo Young-jin	Martin Wave; Bantu; Dr. Chaii; Yoo Young-jin	3:15
4.	"Diggity"	Kenzie	Kenzie; Jonatan Gusmark; Ludvig Evers; Moa "Cazzi Opeia" Carlebecker	Moonshine	3:29
5.	"Life Is Still Going On" (오르골; Oreugol; 'Music box')	Jeon Ji-eun (January 8th (Lalala Studio)); Hwang Seon-jeong (January 8th (Lalala Studio)); Kim Jeong-mi (January 8th (Lalala Studio))	Uzoechi Emenike; Sam Klempner	Sam Klempner	3:38
6.	"Dive into You" (고래; Gorae; 'Whale')	Ellie Suh (153/Joombas)	David Wilson; Wyatt Sanders; James Abrahart	Dwilly	3:12
7.	"My Youth" (우리의 계절; Uriui gyejeol; 'Our season')	Lee Ji-yoon	David Wilson; Wyatt Sanders; Scott Effman	Dwilly	3:56
8.	"Rocket"	Jo Yoon-kyung	Jonatan Gusmark; Ludvig Evers; Stephan Benson (Misunderstood); Jeffrey Okyere-Twumasi (Misunderstood); Realmeee	Moonshine	2:55
9.	"Countdown (3, 2, 1)"	Jang Jeong-won; Rick Bridges	Jonatan Gusmark; Ludvig Evers; Deez; Bobii Lewis; Rick Bridges; Supreme Boi; Slow Rabbit	Moonshine	3:34
10.	"ANL"	Jane; Ron; Grizzly; Daegam (Cracker); E.Do (Cracker); Junny; Aisle	No2zcat; Aisle; Junny; Ron	No2zcat	3:45
11.	"Irreplaceable" (주인공; Juingong; 'Hero')	Cho A-young (153/Joombas); Rick Bridges	Deez; The Family; Rick Bridges	Deez	3:24
12.	"Be There for You" (지금처럼만; Jigeumcheoreomman; 'Just like now') (Sung by Renjun, Haechan & Chenle)	MinGtion; Junny	MinGtion; Junny	MinGtion	3:43
13.	"Rainbow" (책갈피; Chaekgalpi; 'Bookmark')	Jo Yoon-kyung; Mark; Jeno; Jaemin; Jisung	Jurek Reunamäki; Rik Annema; Cimo Fränkel; Annie Schindel; Griff Clawson	Jurek Reunamäki	3:51
Total length:					45:57

== Charts ==
=== Weekly charts ===
Chart performance for both Hot Sauce and Hello Future
Chart (2021)	Peak position	
Chart (2021)	Hot Sauce	Hello Future
Belgian Albums (Ultratop Flanders)	132	74
Belgian Albums (Ultratop Wallonia)	190	91
Croatian International Albums (HDU)	11	–
Finnish Physical Albums (Suomen virallinen lista)	5	–
Hungarian Albums (MAHASZ)	9	35
Japanese Albums (Oricon)	1	–
Japan Hot Albums (Billboard Japan)	2	2
South Korean Albums (Gaon)	1	1
Swedish Physical Albums (Sverigetopplistan)	8	–
UK Album Downloads (Official Charts)	72	–
US Heatseekers Albums (Billboard)	24	–
US World Albums (Billboard)	10	–

=== Monthly charts ===
Chart performance for both Hot Sauce and Hello Future
Chart (2021)	Peak position	
Chart (2021)	HS	HF
Japanese Albums (Oricon)	1	–
South Korean Albums (Gaon)	1	3

=== Year-end charts ===
Year-end chart performance for both Hot Sauce and Hello Future
Chart (2021)	Position	
Chart (2021)	HS	HF
Hungarian Albums (MAHASZ)	91	—
Japanese Albums (Oricon)	29	—
Japan Hot Albums (Billboard Japan)	55	100
South Korean Albums (Gaon)	3	11

== Certifications and sales ==
Hot Sauce and Hello Future
Region	Certification	Certified units/sales
Japan (Hot Sauce)	—	120,586
South Korea (KMCA) (Hot Sauce)	2× Million	2,168,436
South Korea (KMCA) (Hello Future)	Million	1,077,336
South Korea (KMCA) (Hello Future) (Kit)	Platinum	287,367

== Accolades ==
Awards and nominations for Hot Sauce and Hello Future
Year	Ceremony	Category	Nominated work	Result	Ref.
2021	Melon Music Awards	Album of the Year	Hot Sauce	Nominated	
2021	Hanteo Music Awards	Initial Chodong Record Award	Hot Sauce	Won	
2022	Gaon Chart Music Awards	Song of the Year — June	"Hello Future"	Nominated	
2022	Gaon Chart Music Awards	Album of the Year — 2nd Quarter	Hot Sauce	Won	
2022	Gaon Chart Music Awards	Album of the Year — 3rd Quarter	Hello Future	Nominated	
2022	Golden Disc Awards	Album Bonsang	Hot Sauce	Won	
2022	Seoul Music Awards	Best Album	Hot Sauce	Won	

Music program awards
Song	Program	Date	Ref.
"Hello Future"	M Countdown	July 8, 2021	
"Hello Future"	M Countdown	July 15, 2021	
"Hello Future"	Music Bank	July 9, 2021	
"Hello Future"	Show! Music Core	July 10, 2021	
"Hello Future"	Inkigayo	July 11, 2021	
"Hello Future"	Show Champion	July 14, 2021	

== Release history ==
Release formats for Hot Sauce
Region	Date	Format	Distributor	Ref.
Various	May 10, 2021	Digital download	SM Entertainment	
South Korea	May 10, 2021	Digital download	SM Entertainment	
South Korea	May 10, 2021	CD	SM Entertainment; Dreamus	
