= WayV discography =

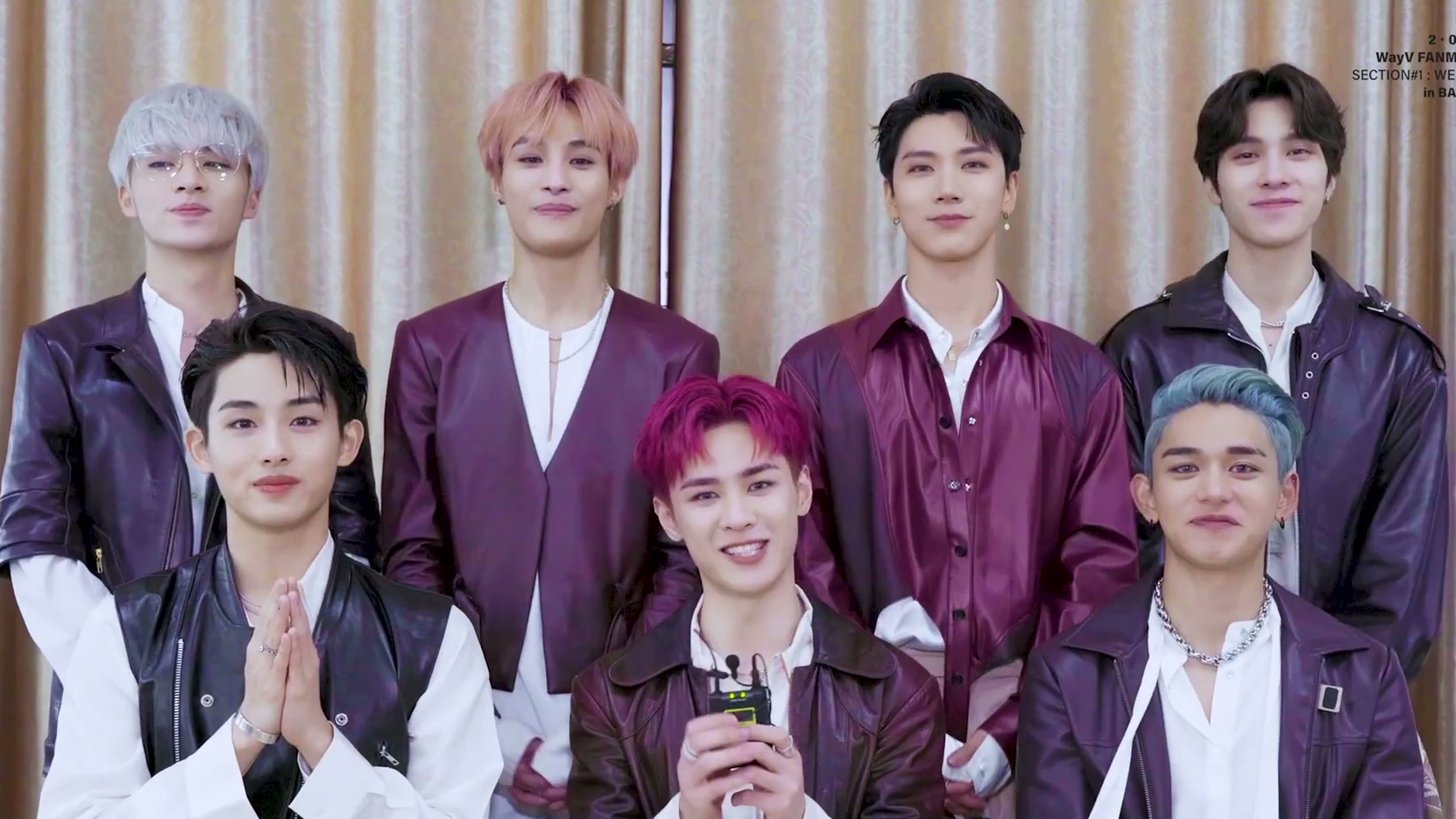
- Studio albums: 2
- EPs: 10
- Singles: 16
- Single albums: 1
- Reissues: 1

Chinese boy band and the fourth overall sub-unit of the South Korean boy band NCT, WayV, has released two studio albums, one reissue, ten extended plays (EP), one single album, and sixteen singles with SM Entertainment's Chinese sub-label, Label V. WayV debuted in 2019 with the single album The Vision, with a Chinese version of NCT 127's "Regular" as the lead single. In the same year, the group entered the Billboard World Albums chart for the first time with their first EP, Take Off. Their second EP, Take Over the Moon, was released on October 29, 2019, and debuted in the South Korean Gaon Album Chart and Billboard Heatseekers Albums chart. In 2020, WayV's first studio album, Awaken the World, managed to enter the top ten on both Gaon and Billboard World Albums chart as well as became the group's first entry on the Japanese Oricon and Billboard Japan charts. In 2021, WayV managed to top the Gaon Album Chart for the first time with their third EP, Kick Back, which also earned the group their first certification for selling more than 250,000 copies in South Korea. After almost two years of hiatus, WayV released their fourth EP, Phantom, in December 2022 as a sextet. In November 2023, WayV's second studio album, On My Youth WayV released their fifth EP, Give Me That, in June 2024 as a sextet. WayV released their first Japanese EP, The Highest, in August 2024 as a sextet. WayV released their sixth EP, Frequency, in November 2024 as a sextet. WayV released their seventh EP, Big Bands, in July 2025 as a sextet.

Beside unit releases, WayV also released songs as part of NCT's albums, such as "月之迷 (Nectar)" (for NCT 2020 Resonance) and "Miracle" (for Universe).

== Albums ==
=== Studio albums ===
List of studio albums, showing selected details, selected chart positions, sales figures, and certifications
Title	Details	Peak chart positions						Sales	Certifications
Title	Details	KOR	HUN	JPN	JPN Hot	UK Down.	US World	Sales	Certifications
Awaken the World	Released: June 9, 2020; Label: Label V, SM Entertainment; Formats: CD, download, streaming	3	22	19	33	55	9	WW: 280,133; KOR: 127,500; JPN: 5,742 (Note: Japanese cumulative physical and digital sales of Awaken the World as of July 2020)	
On My Youth	Released: November 1, 2023; Label: Label V, SM Entertainment; Formats: CD, download, streaming, SMC	4	—	5	4	—	—	KOR: 450,091; JPN: 24,010 (Note: Japanese cumulative physical and digital sales of On My Youth as of May 2024)	KMCA: Platinum

=== Reissues ===
List of reissues, showing selected details, selected chart positions, and sales figures
Title	Details	Peak chart positions	Sales
Title	Details	KOR	Sales
Take Over the Moon - Sequel	Released: March 13, 2020 (KOR); Label: Label V, SM Entertainment; Format: CD	3	KOR: 74,179

=== Single albums ===
List of single albums and showing selected details
Title	Details
The Vision	Released: January 17, 2019 (CHN); Label: Label V, SM Entertainment; Formats: Download, streaming

== Extended plays ==
List of extended plays, showing selected details, selected chart positions, sales figures, and certifications
Title	Details	Peak chart positions							Sales	Certifications
Title	Details	KOR	FRA Dig.	JPN	JPN Hot	UK Down.	US Heat.	US World	Sales	Certifications
Take Off	Released: May 9, 2019 (CHN); Label: Label V, SM Entertainment; Formats: CD, download, streaming	—	76	—	—	—	—	7		
Take Over the Moon	Released: October 29, 2019 (CHN); Label: Label V, SM Entertainment; Formats: CD, download, streaming	5	88	—	—	76	24	12	KOR: 104,922; JPN: 5,397	
Kick Back	Released: March 10, 2021 (CHN); Label: Label V, SM Entertainment; Formats: CD, download, streaming	1	*	13	35	—	—	—	KOR: 354,735; JPN: 17,559 (Note: Japanese cumulative physical and digital sales of Phantom as of June 2021)	KMCA: Platinum
Phantom	Released: December 28, 2022 (CHN); Label: Label V, SM Entertainment; Formats: CD, download, streaming	5	*	4	5	—	—	—	KOR: 236,147; JPN: 12,788 (Note: Japanese cumulative physical and digital sales of Phantom as of March 2023)	
Give Me That	Released: June 3, 2024 (CHN); Label: Label V, SM Entertainment; Formats: CD, download, streaming	1	*	5	3	—	—	—	KOR: 412,770; JPN: 20,920	KMCA: Platinum
The Highest	Released: August 8, 2024 (JPN); Label: Avex Trax; Formats: CD, download, streaming	—	*	1	2	—	—	—	JPN: 70,221 (Note: Japanese cumulative physical and digital sales of The Highest as of November 2024)	
Frequency	Released: November 25, 2024 (CHN); Label: Label V, SM Entertainment; Formats: CD, download, streaming	2	*	7	7	—	—	—	KOR: 395,872; JPN: 1,595	KMCA: Platinum
Big Bands	Released: July 18, 2025 (CHN); Label: Label V, SM Entertainment; Formats: CD, download, streaming	3	*	8	—	—	—	—	KOR: 316,650; JPN: 5,607	KMCA: Platinum
Eternal White	Released: December 8, 2025 (CHN); Label: Label V, SM Entertainment; Formats: CD, download, streaming	1	*	11	—	—	—	—	KOR: 208,830; JPN: 1,014	
Vision Wings	Released: August 10, 2026 (CHN); Label: Label V, SM Entertainment; Formats: CD, download, streaming	1	*	48	—	—	—	—	KOR: 233,306; JPN: 553	
"—" denotes releases that did not chart or were not released in that region. "*" denotes the chart did not exist at that time.

== Singles ==
List of singles, showing year released, selected chart positions, sales figures, and name of the album
Title	Year	Peak chart positions						Sales	Album
Title	Year	CHN (Note: The China TME UNI Chart was launched by Tencent Music in 2018 and first published by Billboard in November 2022.)	KOR	JPN Hot	JPN Down.	UK Sales	US World	Sales	Album
"Regular" (理所当然)	2019	14	—	—	—	—	3	US: 1,000	The Vision
"Take Off" (无翼而飞)	2019	17	—	—	—	—	25	—	Take Off
"Moonwalk" (天选之城)	2019	18	—	—	—	—	23	—	Take Over the Moon
"Love Talk"	2019	50	—	—	—	—	3	—	Take Over the Moon
"Turn Back Time" (超时空 回)	2020	3	—	—	—	—	12	—	Awaken the World
"Bad Alive" (English Version)	2020	—	—	—	—	—	12	—	Awaken the World
"Kick Back" (秘境)	2021	7	—	—	—	—	—	—	Kick Back
"Back to You" (这时烟火) (as WayV-Kun & Xiaojun)	2021	22	—	—	—	—	16	—	Phantom
"Low Low" (as WayV-Ten & Yangyang)	2021	33	— (Note: "Low Low" did not enter the Circle Digital Chart, but it peaked at number 56 on the component Download Chart.)	—	67	—	—	—	Phantom
"Phantom"	2022	16	—	—	—	—	—	—	Phantom
"Welcome to My Paradise"	2023	—	—	—	57	—	—	—	Non-album single
"On My Youth" (遗憾效应)	2023	86	—	—	—	—	—	—	On My Youth
"Give Me That"	2024	96	— (Note: "Give Me That" (Korean version) did not enter the Circle Digital Chart, but it peaked at number 11 on the component Download Chart.)	—	30	28	—	—	Give Me That
"Go Higher" (Japanese)	2024	—	—	48	—	—	—	—	The Highest
"High Five" (Korean Version)	2024	—	—	—	—	—	—	—	Frequency
"Frequency" (超频率)	2024	—	91 (Note: Chart position is for the Korean version of the song.)	—	—	18	—	—	Frequency
"Big Bands" (狂想曲)	2025	—	—	—	—	66	—	—	Big Bands
"Eternal White" (白色定格)	2025	—	—	—	—	—	—	—	Eternal White
"Vision Wings" (鸢)	2026	—	—	—	—	—	—	—	Vision Wings
"—" denotes releases that did not chart or were not released in that region.

== Soundtrack appearances ==
List of soundtrack appearances, showing year released, and media title
Title	Year	Media
"Everytime"	2021	Falling Into Your Smile (你微笑时很美)

== Other charted songs ==
List of other charted songs, showing year released, selected chart positions, and name of the album
Title	Year	Peak chart positions			Album
Title	Year	CHN (Note: The China TME UNI Chart was launched by Tencent Music in 2018 and first published by Billboard in November 2022.)	KOR DL	US World	Album
"Come Back" (噩梦)	2019	71	—	7	The Vision
"Dream Launch" (梦想发射计划)	2019	32	—	6	The Vision
"Say It" (真实谎言)	2019	94	—	—	Take Off
"Let Me Love U" (爱不释手)	2019	72	—	—	Take Off
"Love Talk" (秘语)	2019	58	—	—	Take Over the Moon
"Face to Face" (面对面)	2019	49	—	—	Take Over the Moon
"Bad Alive"	2020	47	—	—	Awaken the World
"Unbreakable" (执迷)	2020	61	—	—	Awaken the World
"After Midnight"	2020	30	—	—	Awaken the World
"Only Human"	2020	68	—	—	Awaken the World
"Domino" (多米诺)	2020	74	—	—	Awaken the World
"Electric Hearts"	2020	100	—	—	Awaken the World
"Stand By Me"	2020	86	—	—	Awaken the World
"Nectar" (月之迷)	2020	12	—	—	NCT 2020 Resonance
"All For Love" (梦尽)	2021	25	—	—	Kick Back
"Horizon" (天空海)	2021	37	—	—	Kick Back
"Action Figure"	2021	39	—	—	Kick Back
"Good Time"	2021	93	—	—	Kick Back
"Miracle"	2021	7	—	—	Universe
"She a Wolf"	2024	—	190	—	Give Me That
"Juliette"	2025	—	190	—	2025 SM Town: The Culture, the Future
