= Renjun =

Chinese singer (born 2000)

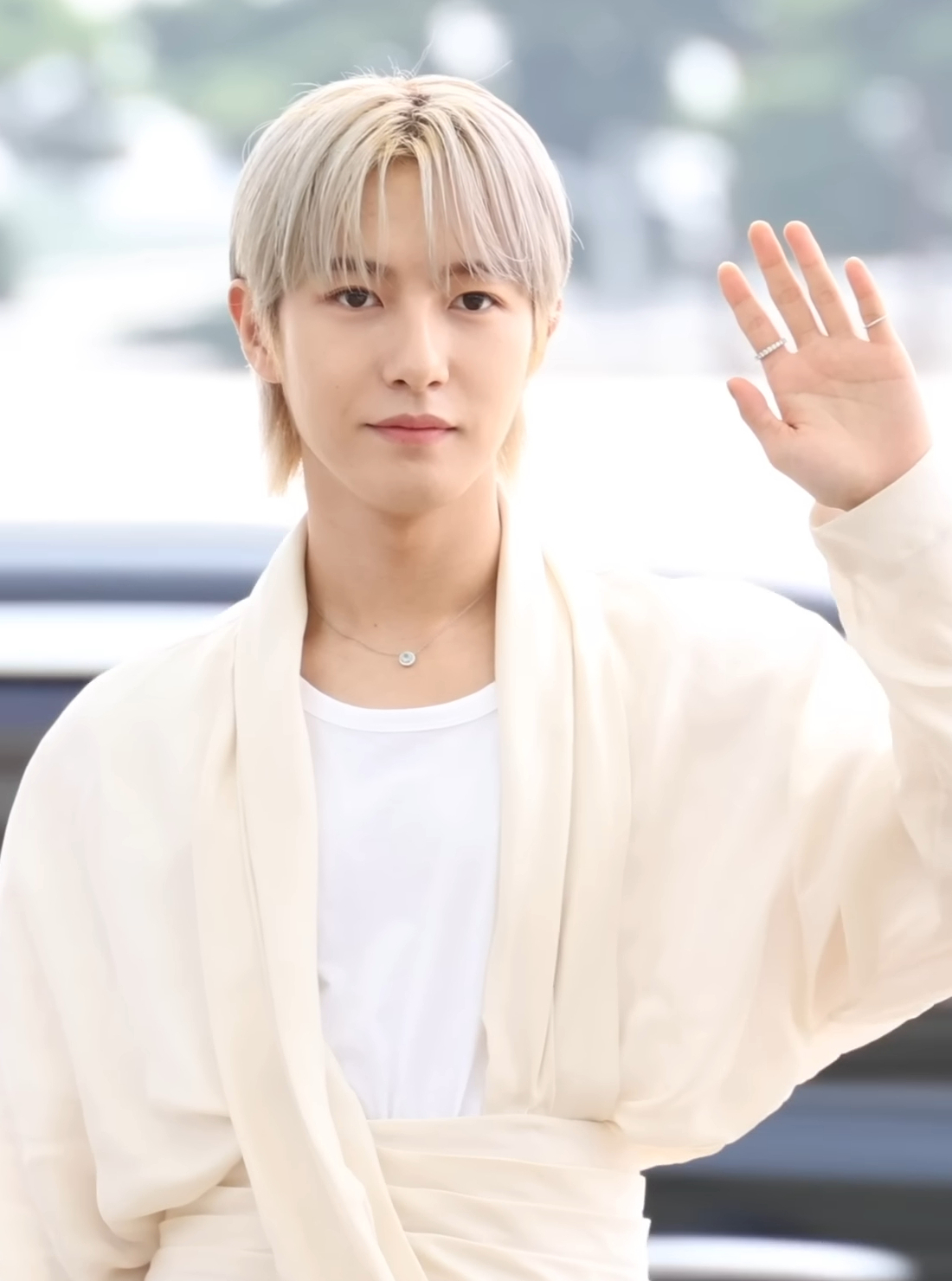
- Renjun in 2023
- Born: Huang Renjun; 23 March 2000 (age 26); Jilin, China
- Occupation: Singer
- Years active: 2016–present
- Musical career
- Origin: Seoul, South Korea
- Genres: K-pop; C-pop
- Instrument: Vocals
- Labels: SM; STE
- Member of: NCT; NCT Dream

Chinese name
- Traditional Chinese: 黃仁俊
- Simplified Chinese: 黄仁俊
Transcriptions
Standard Mandarin
- Hanyu Pinyin: Huáng Rénjùn
- Bopomofo: ㄏㄨㄤˊ ㄖㄣˊㄐㄩㄣˋ
Hakka
- Romanization: Vong Rhinzunˇ
Southern Min
- Hokkien POJ: Hông Lînchùn
Eastern Min
- Fuzhou BUC: Uòng Ìngcóng

Korean name
- Hangul: 인준
- RR: Injun
- MR: Injun

Huang Renjun (Chinese: 黃仁俊; born 23 March 2000), known mononymously as Renjun (Korean: 런쥔), is a Chinese singer. He rose to prominence as a member of the K-pop boy band NCT and its sub-unit NCT Dream.

Born and raised in Jilin, Renjun started training in South Korea under SM Entertainment in 2015. He made his debut in 2016 with NCT, which went on to achieve commercial success and become an influential K-pop act. He released his first extended play (EP), Echoes Between Us, in 2026; one of its tracks, "Halo", entered the top 10 on the TME Uni Chart.

== Life and career ==
=== 2000–2015: Early life and career beginnings ===
Huang Renjun was born on 23 March 2000 in Jilin, China. Growing up near the Korean Peninsula, he learned Korean at school. From a young age, Renjun liked K-pop artists such as Rain and Wonder Girls and watched the South Korean reality competition television series K-pop Star (2011–2017), where he first learned about entertainment companies such as SM Entertainment. After discovering the boy band Exo, Renjun decided to audition for SM, traveling to Shenyang in 2015 where he passed and became a trainee. At SM, trainees could receive lessons in singing, musical instruments, acting, modeling, beatboxing, public speaking, foreign languages, and dance styles such as ballet and jazz, depending on their interests and strengths.

=== 2016–2025: NCT ===
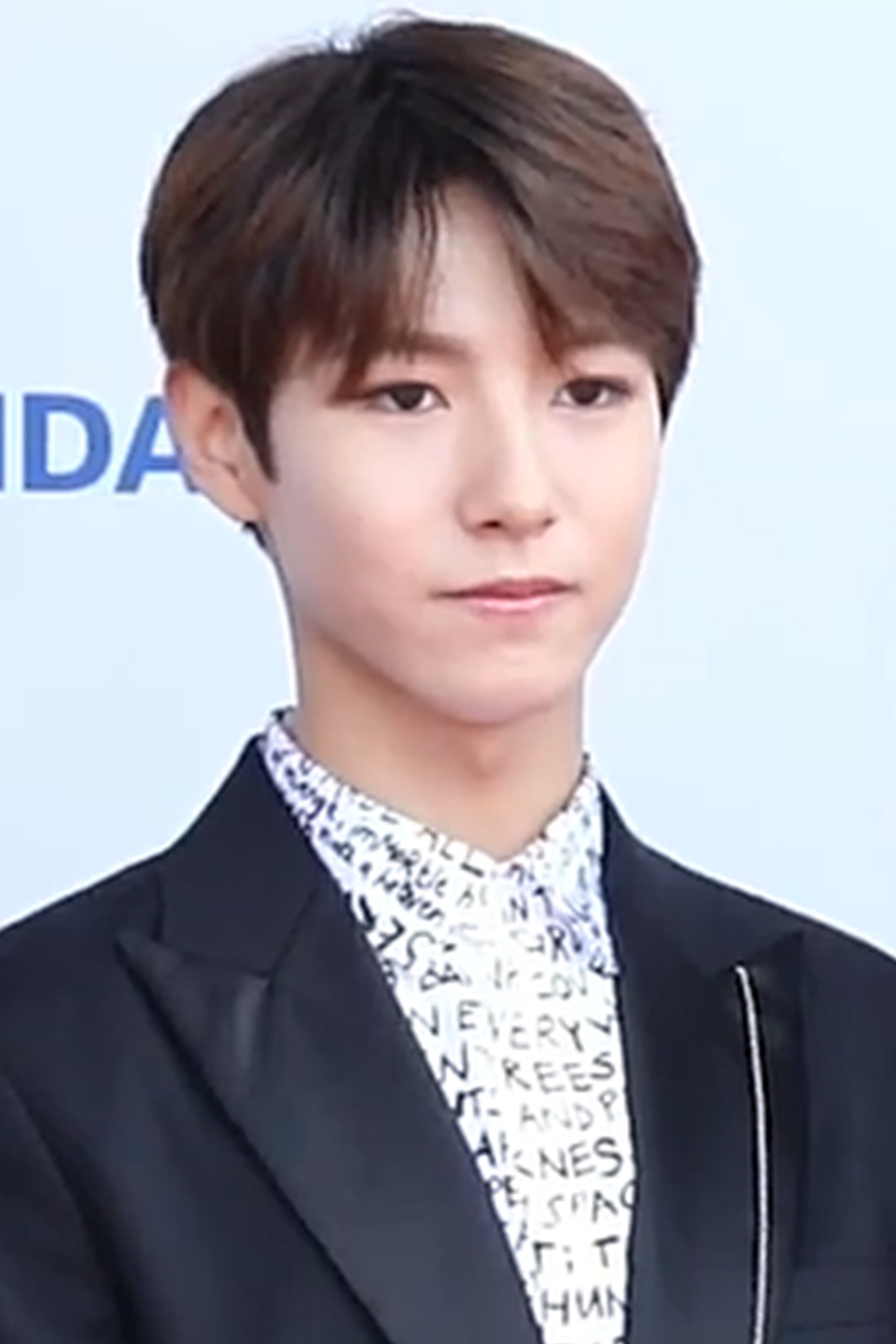
Renjun at the 24th Dream Concert in May 2018

In August 2016, SM announced that Renjun would join NCT, a boy band designed with a concept of unlimited members where smaller sub-units would debut independently and occasionally collaborate under the sub-unit NCT U. He debuted on 25 August with NCT's third sub-unit, NCT Dream, performing their first single, "Chewing Gum", on the television music program M Countdown. Initially established as NCT's teen unit, all members debuted as minors under a graduation system where they would leave the group upon reaching adulthood; however, the graduation concept was scrapped in 2020. Music critics described NCT Dream as the unit with the most compelling narrative, remarking on how their transition from teen pop to a blend of hip-hop and R&B music reflected the members' artistic growth from adolescence to adulthood. Renjun contributed to the band's first full-group album, NCT 2018 Empathy (2018), and made his first appearance under NCT U with the track "From Home", released in October 2020. Grammy.com stated that NCT became one of the most influential K-pop acts; in particular, NCT Dream achieved commercial success, recording ten consecutive million-seller albums.

In August 2019, Renjun began hosting the radio show Akdong Seoul on the South Korean station TBS, broadcasting in both Chinese and Korean. Initially scheduled for a limited two-month run, the broadcast was extended until October 2020. In 2020, Renjun and his bandmate Chenle graduated from the Beijing Contemporary Music Academy, which released their graduation song, "A New Beginning", on 20 May. In September 2023, Renjun and Chenle received the Recommended Popular Artist Award at the Weibo Music Awards. Later that December, Renjun collaborated with Chenle and his bandmates Kun and Xiaojun as NCT U to release the single "Marine Turtle" under the NCT Lab project. Recorded in both Chinese and Korean, the synth-driven pop track metaphorically compares the determination to move forward in life to a marine turtle hatching from its egg.

In April 2024, Renjun paused his promotional activities due to physical health issues and symptoms of anxiety; earlier that month, he had expressed distress after a sasaeng had obtained his personal phone number and sent him abusive messages. Although he participated in NCT Dream's single "Rains in Heaven" later that August, he remained absent from their ongoing concert tour, The Dream Show 3: Dream( )scape. Renjun officially resumed his activities in October, joining the group for the European leg of the tour.

=== 2026–present: Echoes Between Us ===
Renjun digitally released his debut extended play (EP), Echoes Between Us, on Chinese music platforms on 1 June 2026, with its title track pre-released on 26 May. Comprising three songs, the EP depicts the process of accepting a break-up and moving forward. On 13 June, Renjun held a sold-out showcase at the Mango Hall of the Hunan International Exhibition and Convention Center in Changsha, China. The following month, he and Chenle embarked on a fanmeeting tour, titled Roommate, visiting five cities in China. In August, Renjun won the Breakthrough Artist of the Year at the Tencent Music Entertainment Awards, where he performed "Echoes Between Us". That same month, SM announced that Renjun had renewed his exclusive contract, with his activities in China set to be managed by their newly established subsidiary, STE.

== Other ventures ==
=== Endorsements ===
In 2020, Renjun was the spokesperson for the Chinese water park Oyf Hot Spring World. After praising a fan's perfume by the Thai brand Janua, causing several products to sell out in November 2024, Renjun was appointed as the brand's ambassador in September 2025. Later that November, Renjun became the brand ambassador for the Chinese cosmetics brand Babi's sunscreen line.

=== Philanthropy ===
In May 2017, Renjun and Chenle volunteered in a classroom in Nanjing through a CJ Group program that aimed to improve educational facilities and cultural opportunities for the children of migrant workers.

== Discography ==
=== Extended plays ===
List of extended plays, with selected details
Title	Details
Echoes Between Us	Released: 1 June 2026 (CHN); Labels: SM, TME; Formats: Digital download, streaming; Track listing: 1. "Echoes Between Us" (同谋者的默契); 2. "Good Slumber" (好眠); 3. "Halo"

=== Singles ===
List of singles as lead artist, with year of release, selected chart positions, and associated album
Title	Year	Peak chart positions	Album
Title	Year	CHN	Album
"Hot Rice & Warm Soup" (热汤浓饭) (with Chenle, Chen Bochuan, and Gu Deleke)	2026	—	Non-album single
"Echoes Between Us" (同谋者的默契)	2026	15	Echoes Between Us
"—" denotes a recording that did not chart or was not released in that territory.

=== Other charted songs ===
List of other charted songs, with year of release, selected chart positions, and associated album
Title	Year	Peak chart positions		Album
Title	Year	CHN	KOR DL	Album
"Goodbye" (12월의 인사) (with Sunny and Jungwoo)	2021	—	85	2021 Winter SM Town: SMCU Express
"Happier" (with Kangta, Yesung, Suho, and Taeil)	2022	—	121	2022 Winter SM Town: SMCU Palace
"Good Slumber" (好眠)	2026	12	—	Echoes Between Us
"Halo"	2026	7	—	Echoes Between Us
"—" denotes a recording that did not chart or was not released in that territory.

=== Writing credits ===
Key
Indicates songs in which writers are credited specifically for the Korean lyrics

List of songs by name, with credited artist(s), lyricist(s), composer(s), associated album, and year of release
Title	Artist(s)	Lyricist(s)	Composer(s)	Album	Year	Ref.
"A New Beginning" (新的开始)	Renjun and Chenle	Renjun; Chenle		Non-album single	2020	
"Like We Just Met"	NCT Dream	Mark; Renjun; Jeno; Haechan; Jaemin; Chenle; Jisung	Allegro; Dan Johnson; Robbie Jay; Mark; Jeno; Jaemin	ISTJ	2023	

== Filmography ==
=== Radio ===
Year	Title	Role	Ref.
2019–2020	Akdong Seoul	Host	

== Live performances ==
=== Joint fan meetings ===
List of joint fan meetings, with co-headliner, dates, and locations
Title	Co-headliner	Date	Venue	City	Country	Ref.
Roommate	Chenle	5 July 2026	Gongshu Canal Sports Park Gymnasium	Hangzhou	China	
Roommate	Chenle	11 July 2026	Olympic Green Gymnasium	Beijing	China	
Roommate	Chenle	17 July 2026	Chengdu Sports Centre Multipurpose Gymnasium	Chengdu	China	
Roommate	Chenle	19 July 2026	Guangzhou Gymnasium	Guangzhou	China	
Roommate	Chenle	25 July 2026	Shanghai Gymnasium	Shanghai	China	

=== Showcases ===
List of showcases, with date and location
Title	Co-headliner	Venue	City	Country	Ref.
Echoes Between Us	13 June 2026	Hunan International Exhibition and Convention Center	Changsha	China	

== Accolades ==
=== Awards and nominations ===
List of awards and nominations, with name of the award, year of ceremony, recipient, category, and result of the nomination
Award	Year	Recipient	Category	Result	Ref.
Tencent Music Entertainment Awards	2026	Renjun	Breakthrough Artist of the Year	Won	
Weibo Music Awards	2023	Renjun and Chenle	Recommended Popular Artist Award	Won	

=== Listicles ===
List of listicle placements, with name of the publisher, year of listing, name of the listicle, and placement
Publisher	Year	Listicle	Placement	Ref.
Billboard	2024	K-Pop Artist 100	86th	
Billboard	2025	K-Pop Artist 100	76th	
