= Dream After Dream =

2026 studio album by NCT Dream

Studio album by NCT Dream
- Released: November 9, 2026
- Studios: SM Yellow Tail (Seoul); SM Droplet (Seoul); SM Azure (Seoul); Doobdoob (Seoul); SM Wavelet (Seoul); SM Dorii (Seoul)
- Length: 34:01
- Languages: Korean; English
- Labels: SM; Kakao
- Producers: Wyatt Sanders; John Flynn; Foster Pace; Jean Castel; Deeno; Yejune Synn; Daniel Roughley; Niklas Jarelius Persson; Tim Tan; Stian Nyhammer Olsen; Elias Edman; Jacob Werner; Benjamin 55; Inverness; Ronny Svendsen; Pizzapunk

NCT Dream chronology
Beat It Up (2025)	Dream After Dream (2026)

NCT chronology
I Spy (2026)	Dream After Dream (2026)

Singles from Dream After Dream
- 1. "Boogie Woogie" Released: November 9, 2026

Dream After Dream is the sixth studio album by the South Korean boy band NCT Dream. It was released on November 9, 2026, by SM Entertainment through Kakao Entertainment, along with its lead single "Boogie Woogie".

== Background ==
The South Korean boy band NCT Dream released their seventh Korean extended play (EP), Beat It Up, in November 2025 to commercial success while headlining their fourth concert tour, The Dream Show 4: Dream the Future. In April 2026, ten years after his debut, a member of the group, Mark, concluded his contract with SM Entertainment and left NCT Dream.

== Release and promotion ==
On October 16, SM confirmed that NCT Dream would release their sixth studio album, Dream After Dream, to commemorate their 10th anniversary. A teaser for the music video of "Boogie Woogie" was released on November 7. A pop-up store named Welcome, Dreamers was opened in Seongsu-dong, Seoul, from November 8–16, featuring two themed spaces with challenge-based events and merchandise. Dream After Dream was released at 6 PM (KST) on November 9, 2026, along with the music video of "Boogie Woogie".

== Commercial performance ==
Dream After Dream sold 665,402 copies on its first day of release.

== Track listing ==
No.	Title	Lyrics	Music	Arrangement	Length
1.	"The Sun"	Subbit (Artiffect)^{[a]}	Wyatt Sanders; John Flynn; Foster Pace; Jean Castel; Megan Young	Sanders; Flynn; Pace; Castel	4:18
2.	"Boogie Woogie"	Joowon^{[a]}; Jaemin^{[a]}	Deeno; Yejune Synn; Dochi; Kuzzi	Deeno; Synn	3:12
3.	"Dream After Dream"	Jo Yoon-kyung^{[a]}	Cyrus Villanueva; Wiljam; Daniel Roughley; Niklas Jarelius Persson	Roughley; Persson	3:23
4.	"Skydive"	Bang Hye-hyun^{[a]}	Villanueva; Danny Shah; Tim Tan; Qrated Songs	Tan	3:18
5.	"Pressure"	Jaedogi^{[a]}	Jordan Shaw; Taneisha Jackson; Tan	Tan	3:03
6.	"Watch U Watch Me"	Kim Sang-eun (Jam Factory)^{[a]}	Violet Skies; Theo Lawrence; Stian Nyhammer Olsen	Olsen	3:16
7.	"Cool for Me"	Wutan (Up)^{[a]}	Elias Edman; Jacob Werner; Jop Pangemanan; Bobii Lewis	Edman; Werner	2:47
8.	"Tumbler"	Bang^{[a]}	Benjamin 55	Benjamin 55	3:33
9.	"Smile for U"	Haechan^{[a]}; Kelbyul (153/Joombas)^{[a]}	Kyle Reynolds; Faangs; Kella Armitage; Rob "Inverness" Nelson	Inverness	3:25
10.	"This Is Your World"	Kang Eun-yu^{[a]}	Ronny Svendsen; Adrian "Pizzapunk" Thesen; Pangemanan; Henrik Heaven	Svendsen; Pizzapunk	3:49
Total length:					34:01

=== Notes ===
- ^{^[a]} Writer credited specifically for the Korean lyrics.

== Credits ==
=== Locations ===
- SM Yellow Tail Studio – recording (tracks 1–3, 7), digital editing (tracks 2–3), engineering for mix (track 3)
- SM Droplet Studio – recording (tracks 1, 4, 6, 9–10), digital editing (track 4), additional recording (track 8)
- SM Azure Studio – recording (tracks 1–2, 5, 9), digital editing (track 5)
- Doobdoob Studio – digital editing (tracks 1, 7, 10), recording (track 3)
- SM Tacet Studio – engineering for mix (tracks 1, 7, 10)
- SM Blue Ocean Studio – mixing (tracks 1, 3)
- SM Concert Hall Studio – mixing (tracks 2, 10)
- SM Wavelet Studio – additional recording (tracks 3, 10), recording (tracks 8–9), digital editing (tracks 8–9)
- SM Dorii Studio – additional recording (tracks 4–5, 7, 9), recording (track 6), digital editing (track 6)
- SM Blue Cup Studio – mixing (tracks 4, 6)
- SM Big Shot Studio – mixing (tracks 5, 7)
- SM Starlight Studio – mixing (tracks 8–9)
- Sterling Sound – mastering

=== Personnel ===
- NCT Dream – vocals
  - Renjun – background vocals (track 9)
  - Jeno – background vocals (track 7)
  - Haechan – background vocals (track 7)
  - Jaemin – background vocals (track 9)
  - Chenle – background vocals (tracks 1, 3–4, 6, 8)
  - Jisung – background vocals (tracks 3, 7)
- Ondine – vocal directing (tracks 1, 3–4, 6, 8–10)
- Joowon – vocal directing (tracks 1–3, 5–7), background vocals (tracks 1–7, 9–10)
- Noh Min-ji – recording (tracks 1–3, 7), digital editing (tracks 2–3), engineering for mix (track 3)
- Kim Joo-hyun – recording (tracks 1, 4, 6, 9–10), digital editing (track 4), additional recording (track 8)
- Kim Jae-yeon – recording (tracks 1–2, 5, 9), digital editing (track 5)
- Kwon Yu-jin – digital editing (tracks 1, 7)
- Kim Hyeon-ji – engineering for mix (tracks 1, 7, 10)
- Kim Cheol-sun – mixing (tracks 1, 3)
- Henry "Dirty Loops" Linder – bass (track 2)
- Deeno – piano, synthesizer, computer programming (track 2)
- Yejune Synn – piano, synthesizer, computer programming (track 2)
- Nam Koong-jin – mixing (tracks 2, 10)
- Yu Jae-beom – recording (track 3)
- Kang Eun-ji – additional recording (tracks 3, 10), recording (tracks 8–9), digital editing (tracks 8–9)
- Jeong Jae-won – additional recording (tracks 4–5, 7, 9), recording (track 6), digital editing (track 6)
- Jung Eui-seok – mixing (tracks 4, 6)
- Kaizen – vocal directing (tracks 5, 9)
- Lee Min-kyu – mixing (tracks 5, 7)
- Theo Lawrence – background vocals (track 6)
- Stian Nyhammer Olsen – computer programming (track 6)
- Jsong – vocal directing (tracks 8, 10)
- Benjamin 55 – background vocals (track 8)
- Jeong Yoo-ra – mixing (tracks 8–9)
- Ronny Svendsen – guitar, computer programming (track 10)
- Adrian Thesen – computer programming (track 10)
- Jang Woo-young – digital editing (track 10)
- Joe LaPorta – mastering

== Charts ==
Chart performance for Dream After Dream
Chart (2026)	Peak position
Japanese Albums (Oricon)	30
Japanese Combined Albums (Oricon)	28
Japanese Hot Albums (Billboard Japan)	22
South Korean Albums (Circle)	2

== Release history ==
Releases for Dream After Dream
Region	Date	Label(s)	Format(s)	Ref.
Various	November 9, 2026	SM; Kakao	CD; digital download; streaming	
