= Dreamscape (album) =

- Digital cover

Studio album by NCT Dream
- Released: November 11, 2024
- Length: 33:59
- Languages: Korean; English
- Labels: SM; Kakao

NCT Dream chronology
Dream()scape (2024)	Dreamscape (2024)	Go Back to the Future (2025)

NCT chronology
Steady (2024)	Dreamscape (2024)	Frequency (2024)

Singles from Dreamscape
- 1. "Rains in Heaven" Released: August 23, 2024; 2. "Flying Kiss" Released: November 8, 2024; 3. "When I'm with You" Released: November 11, 2024

Dreamscape is the fourth studio album by South Korean boy band NCT Dream. Released on November 11, 2024, by SM Entertainment through Kakao Entertainment, the album consists of 11 tracks, including the previously released track "Rains in Heaven" and lead single "When I'm with You".

== Background and release ==
First news of the project came when SM Entertainment confirmed on August 8 that NCT Dream would be releasing a full-length album in the fourth-quarter of 2024. "Rains in Heaven", the band's first English-language single, was released on August 23.

Dreamscape was officially announced on October 21. At the same time, it was announced that the album would contain 11 tracks, including the previously released "Rains in Heaven". The band released "Flying Kiss", along with its accompanying music video, on November 8 as a pre-release single. The album, along with its lead single "When I'm with You", was released on November 11, 2024.

== Promotion ==
The group will promote the album with three encore performances of their "The Dream Show 3: Dream( )scape" world tour at Gocheok Sky Dome in Seoul from November 29 through December 1, 2024. Tickets for the concerts went on sale October 15 and sold out in minutes during fan club pre-sale, before ever being made available to the general public.

== Track listing ==
Credits adapted from the album's liner notes.

Dreamscape track listing
No.	Title	Lyrics	Music	Arrangement	Length
1.	"Intro: Dreamscape"	Woo Seung-yeon (153/Joombas) (Note: Korean lyrics only.)	Pontus Kalm; Jakob Lindell	Kalm; Lindell	2:17
2.	"When I'm with You"	Lee Eun-hwa (153/Joombas); Jiwon (153/Joombas); Mark	Lewis Jankel; Shae Jacobs; Imlay; Dvwn; Mark	Shift K3Y; Imlay	3:31
3.	"Flying Kiss"	Haechan	Ronny Svendsen; Adrian Thesen; Henrik Heaven; Louise Lindberg	Svendsen; Pizzapunk	3:19
4.	"I Hate Fruits"	Mark	Jurek Reunamäki; Rachel West; Anthony Watts; Tido Nguyen	Reunamäki; Nguyen	3:04
5.	"No Escape"	Kim Soo-ji (Lalala Studio)	Reunamäki; Tony Ferrari; Sofia Quinn	Reunamäki	2:56
6.	"Best of Me"	Haechan	Matthew Crawford; Aaron Theodore Berton; Taylor Ryan Dolletzki; Jacob Connor Plough	Theo & The Climb	3:10
7.	"You" (Korean: 숲; RR: Sup; lit. 'Forest')	Jo Yoon-kyung	Coach & Sendo; Henry Oyekanmi	Coach & Sendo	3:31
8.	"Heavenly" (하늘을 나는 꿈; Haneureul naneun kkum; 'Dream of flying in the sky')	Jo	Charlie Martin; Joe Housley; Tom Mann; Mike Needle	Martin; Housley; Mann; Needle	2:43
9.	"Night Poem" (밤; Bam; 'Night')	Hwang Hyun (MonoTree)	James Abrahart; Jackson Foote; Johnny Simpson; Jeremy Dussolliet	Simpson; Foote	2:47
10.	"Off the Wall"	Park Yu-eun (Jam Factory)	Foote; Abrahart; Dussolliet; Simpson	Foote; Simpson	2:38
11.	"Rains in Heaven"	Mark; Adrian McKinnon; Bryn Christopher	Chris Collins; Kella Armitage; Reunamäki	Reunamäki	3:57
Total length:					33:59

== Credits and personnel ==
Credits adapted from the album's liner notes.

Studio

- SM Aube Studio – recording (track 1, 4–10), digital editing (track 5, 9)
- SM Dorii Studio – recording (track 1–2, 4–5, 7–10), digital editing (track 1)
- SM Yellow Tail Studio – recording (track 1–4, 8), digital editing (track 3–4, 8, 11)
- SM Wavelet Studio – recording (track 1–3)
- Sound Pool Studio – recording (track 2)
- SM Droplet Studio – recording (track 5–11), digital editing (track 6, 10), engineered for mix (track 2)
- SM Starlight Studio – recording (track 11), digital editing (track 7), mixing (track 7, 9)
- Doobdoob Studio – digital editing (track 2)
- SM Big Shot Studio – mixing (track 1–2)
- SM Blue Ocean Studio – mixing (track 3–4, 11)
- SM Blue Cup Studio – mixing (track 5–6)
- SM Concert Hall Studio – mixing (track 8, 10)
- 821 Sound – mastering (track 1–10)
- Sterling Sound – mastering (track 11)

Personnel

- SM Entertainment – executive producer
- NCT Dream – vocals (all tracks)
  - Mark – background vocals (track 3, 5, 8)
  - Renjun – background vocals (track 2, 6–7, 9)
  - Jeno – background vocals (track 5, 8)
  - Haechan – background vocals (track 1–3, 5–9)
  - Jaemin – background vocals (track 5, 8)
  - Chenle – background vocals (track 1–3, 5–7, 9–10)
  - Jisung – background vocals (track 2–3, 5, 9)
- Lewis Jankel a.k.a. Shift K3Y – background vocals (track 2)
- Shae Jacobs – background vocals (track 2)
- Louise Lindberg – background vocals (track 3)
- Aaron Theodore Berton (Theo & The Climb) – background vocals (track 6)
- Jacob Connor Plough – background vocals (track 6)
- Coach & Sendo – guitar, keyboards (track 7)
- James Abrahart – background vocals (track 9–10)
- Jackson Foote – background vocals (track 9–10)
- Johnny Simpson – background vocals (track 9–10)
- Jeremy Dussolliet – background vocals (track 9–10)
- Chris Collins – background vocals (track 11)
- Ju Chan-yang (Pollen) – vocal directing (track 1–2, 4–10)
- Young Chance – vocal directing (track 1–2, 4–10)
- MinGtion – vocal directing (track 3)
- Choo Dae-kwan a.k.a. DK Choo – vocal directing, Pro Tools operating (track 5, 7–9)
- Junny – background vocals (track 8)
- Kenzie – vocal directing (track 11)
- Kim Hyo-joon – recording (track 1, 4–10), digital editing (track 5, 9)
- Jeong Jae-won – recording (track 1–2, 4–5, 7–10), digital editing (track 1)
- Noh Min-ji – recording (track 1–4, 8), digital editing (track 3–4, 8, 11)
- Kang Eun-ji – recording (track 1–3)
- Jeong Ho-jin – recording (track 2)
- Kim Joo-hyun – recording (track 5–11), digital editing (track 6, 10), engineered for mix (track 2)
- Jeong Yoo-ra – recording (track 11), digital editing (track 7), mixing (track 7, 9)
- Eugene Kwon – digital editing (track 2)
- Lee Min-kyu – mixing (track 1–2)
- Kim Cheol-sun – mixing (track 3–4, 11)
- Jung Eui-seok – mixing (track 5–6)
- Nam Koong-jin – mixing (track 8, 10)
- Kwon Nam-woo – mastering (track 1–10)
- Chris Gehringer – mastering (track 11)

== Charts ==
=== Album ===
==== Weekly charts ====
Weekly chart performance for Dreamscape
Chart (2024–2025)	Peak position
French Physical Albums (SNEP)	101
Greek Albums (IFPI)	23
Hungarian Physical Albums (MAHASZ)	37
Japanese Albums (Oricon)	5
Japanese Combined Albums (Oricon)	5
Japanese Hot Albums (Billboard Japan)	5
Portuguese Albums (AFP)	118
South Korean Albums (Circle)	1
US Top Album Sales (Billboard)	26
US World Albums (Billboard)	11

==== Monthly charts ====
Monthly chart performance for Dreamscape
Chart (2024)	Position
Japanese Albums (Oricon)	14
South Korean Albums (Circle)	3

=== Year-end charts ===
Year-end chart performance for Dreamscape
Chart (2024)	Position
South Korean Albums (Circle)	10

=== Singles ===
Weekly chart performance for "Rains in Heaven"
Chart (2024)	Peak position
New Zealand Hot Singles (RMNZ)	28
South Korea (Circle)	155
UK Singles Downloads (Official Charts)	11
UK Singles Sales (OCC)	14
US Pop Airplay (Billboard)	39

Weekly chart performance for "When I'm With You"
Chart (2024)	Peak position
China Korean Songs (TME)	3
South Korea (Circle)	8
UK Singles Downloads (Official Charts)	2
UK Singles Sales (OCC)	4

== Certifications ==
Certifications for Dreamscape
Region	Certification	Certified units/sales
South Korea (KMCA)	Million	1,000,000^{^}
^{^} Shipments figures based on certification alone.

== Release history ==
Release history for Dreamscape
Region	Date	Format	Label
Various	November 11, 2024	Digital download; streaming	SM; Kakao
South Korea	November 11, 2024	CD	SM; Kakao
Various	November 15, 2024	CD	SM; Virgin
