= Eternal White (EP) =

- Digital cover

EP by WayV
- Released: December 8, 2025
- Length: 22:35
- Languages: Mandarin; English
- Labels: Label V; SM; Dreamus

WayV chronology
Big Bands (2025)	Eternal White (2025)	Vision Wings (2026)

NCT chronology
Beat It Up (2025)	Eternal White (2025)	Wishlist (2026)

Singles from Eternal White
- 1. "The Fifth Season" Released: December 8, 2025

Eternal White (Chinese: 白色定格) is the first winter special album by the Chinese boy band WayV. It was released digitally on December 8, 2025, by Label V and SM Entertainment. It consists of seven songs, including the single "The Fifth Season". The EP debuted atop the South Korean Circle Album Chart.

== Background and release ==
On November 5, 2025, SM Entertainment announced that WayV would release a mini-album in the fourth quarter of 2025. On November 11, SM Entertainment confirmed WayV's plans for a December release. Five days later, on November 16, Eternal White was announced to be released on December 8.

On November 27, Prism Productions announced that the promotional content intended to be released the next day woyld be delayed to December 1 out of respect for the victims of the Wang Fuk Court fire.

== Track listing ==
Eternal White track listing
No.	Title	Length
1.	"The Fifth Season" (第五个季节)	1:19
2.	"Eternal White" (白色定格)	3:25
3.	"Moment in Time" (月光蚀刻)	3:36
4.	"First Time" (初白)	3:59
5.	"Strange Tears" (陌生的泪)	3:22
6.	"Stay"	3:30
7.	"Lover After Me" (我之后的你)	3:24
Total length:		22:35

== Charts ==
Chart performance for Eternal White
Chart (2025–2026)	Peak position
Japanese Albums (Oricon)	11
South Korean Albums (Circle)	1

== Release history ==
Release history for Eternal White
Region	Date	Format	Label
Various	December 8, 2025	Download; streaming	Label V
South Korea	December 8, 2025	CD	Label V; SM Entertainment
