= Frequency (EP) =

- Digital cover

EP by WayV
- Released: November 25, 2024
- Length: 17:29
- Languages: Mandarin; Korean; English
- Labels: SM; Kakao

WayV chronology
The Highest (2024)	Frequency (2024)	Big Bands (2025)

NCT chronology
Dreamscape (2024)	Frequency (2024)	Wishful (2024)

Singles from Frequency
- 1. "High Five" Released: November 19, 2024; 2. "Frequency" Released: November 25, 2024

Frequency is the sixth EP by the Chinese boy band WayV, released on November 25, 2024 by SM Entertainment and distributed by Kakao Entertainment. The EP comprises six songs, and its release was preceded by the release of the single, "High Five" on November 19, which was released along with second single, the title track of the same name, in both Korean and Mandarin. The album is the third consecutive release by the band without member Winwin, who has been on hiatus from the group since May 2024 due to scheduling conflicts.

== Background and release ==
Frequency is WayV's third project of 2024, following previous EP Give Me That and Japanese debut The Highest. Both releases were successful, debuting at number-one on the South Korean Circle Album Chart and Japanese Oricon Albums Chart, respectively.

First mention of a new WayV release came on August 8, when SM Entertainment released its roadmap for the upcoming two quarters confirming the band was planning to release a new EP in the fourth quarter. Frequency was officially announced on October 28, with SM confirming that the 6-track EP would be released on November 25, along with the title track of the same name, recorded in both Korean and Mandarin.

== Promotion ==
WayV will promote the EP with their ongoing "On the Way" concert tour, which began in August 2024 in Nagoya, Japan. The tour will continue throughout Asia, wrapping up in February 2025.

=== Tour dates ===
List of concerts showing date, city, country, venue, and attendance
Date	City	Country	Venue	Attendance
17 August 2024	Nagoya	Japan	Nagoya International Exhibition Center	
August 18, 2024	Nagoya	Japan	Nagoya International Exhibition Center	
August 21, 2024	Beijing	China	Beijing National Indoor Stadium	
August 24, 2024	Guangzhou	China	Guangzhou Gymnasium Hall 1	
August 28, 2024	Wuhan	China	Wuhan International Expo Center	
August 31, 2024	Shanghai	China	Shanghai International Expo Center	
September 2, 2024	Chengdu	China	Dong'an Lake Sports Park Gymnasium	
September 7, 2024	Nanjing	China	Nanjing Olympic Sports Center	
September 22, 2024	Kobe	Japan	World Memorial Hall	
September 23, 2024	Kobe	Japan	World Memorial Hall	
September 28, 2024	Tokyo	Japan	Yoyogi National Stadium First Gymnasium	
September 29, 2024	Tokyo	Japan	Yoyogi National Stadium First Gymnasium	
October 5, 2024	Jakarta	Indonesia	Istora Gelora Bung Karno Stadium	
November 2, 2024	Bangkok	Thailand	Impact Arena	
November 3, 2024	Bangkok	Thailand	Impact Arena	
November 9, 2024	Taipei	Taiwan	New Taipei City Exhibition Hall	
January 4, 2025	Hong Kong		Asia World Expo Hall	
February 15, 2025	Macau		Studio City Event Center	
February 22, 2025	Seoul	South Korea	Bluesquare Mastercard Hall	
February 23, 2025	Seoul	South Korea	Bluesquare Mastercard Hall	

== Track listing ==
Frequency track listing
No.	Title	Lyrics	Music	Arrangement	Length
1.	"Frequency" (Korean Version)	Kang Eun-jeong; Wutan	Aftrshok; DeadBear; Sam Sznd	Aftrshok; DeadBear	2:40
2.	"High Five"	Park Tae-won	Ludwig Lindell; Chris Meyer; Gabriel Brandes	Lindell	3:02
3.	"Twist"	Park	John Morgan; William Lansley; Andrew Charles Keith Hall; Jack Morgan	Punctual	2:45
4.	"Filthy Rich"	Landon Sears; Colin Magalong; Barry Cohen; MZMC	Sears; Magalong; Cohen; MZMC	Gingerbread; MZMC	2:42
5.	"Call Me"	Dewain Whitmore; Michael Gerow	Daniel Davidsen; Peter Wallevik; Whitmore; Gerow	PhD	3:40
6.	"Frequency" (超频率 (lit. 'Overclocking'))	Pan Yan Ting	Aftrshok; DeadBear; Sam Sznd	Aftrshok; DeadBear	2:40
Total length:					17:29

== Charts ==
=== Weekly charts ===
Weekly chart performance for Frequency
Chart (2024)	Peak position
Japanese Albums (Oricon)	7
Japanese Combined Albums (Oricon)	10
Japanese Hot Albums (Billboard Japan)	7
South Korean Albums (Circle)	2

=== Monthly charts ===
Monthly chart performance for Frequency
Chart (2024)	Position
Japanese Albums (Oricon)	35
South Korean Albums (Circle)	9

=== Year-end charts ===
Year-end chart performance for Frequency
Chart (2024)	Position
South Korean Albums (Circle)	70

== Certifications ==
Certifications for Frequency
Region	Certification	Certified units/sales
South Korea (KMCA)	Platinum	250,000^{^}
^{^} Shipments figures based on certification alone.

== Release history ==
Release history for Frequency
Region	Date	Format	Label
Various	November 25, 2024	Digital download; streaming	SM; Kakao
South Korea	November 25, 2024	CD	SM; Kakao
