= NCT Dream =

South Korean boy band

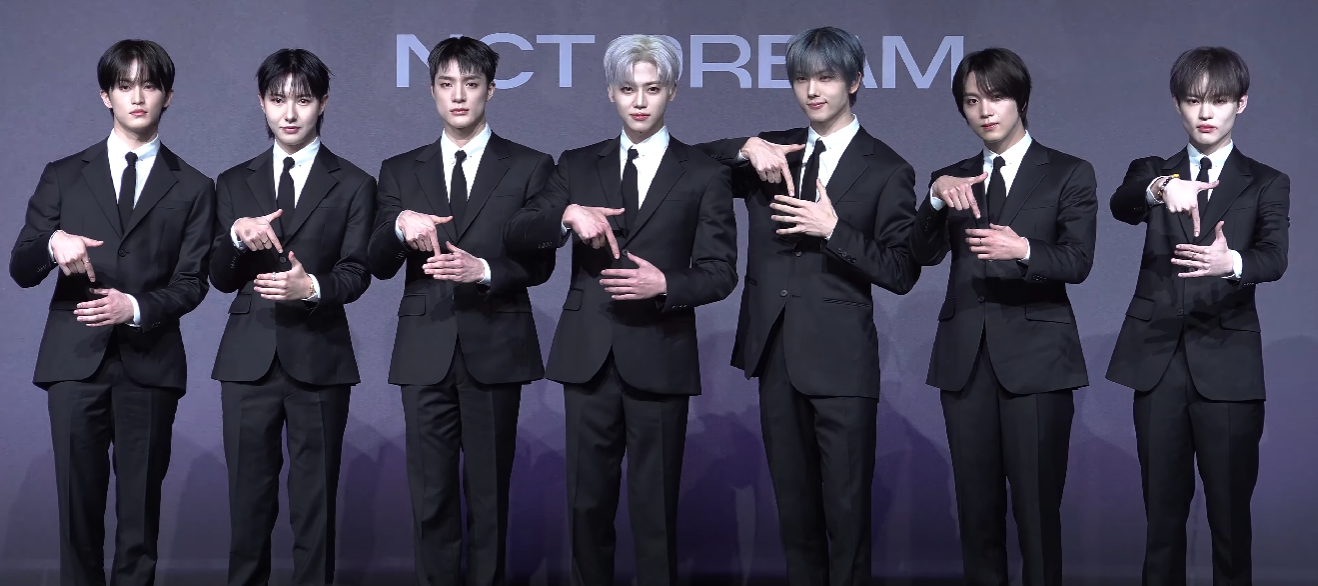
- NCT Dream in March 2024; From left to right: Mark, Renjun, Jeno, Jaemin, Jisung, Haechan, and Chenle

Background information
- Origin: Seoul, South Korea
- Genres: K-pop; hip hop; R&B; teen pop
- Years active: 2016–present
- Labels: SM; Avex Trax; VMG
- Spinoffs: NCT JNJM
- Spinoff of: NCT
- Members: Renjun; Jeno; Haechan; Jaemin; Chenle; Jisung
- Past members: Mark
- Website: Official website

NCT Dream (Korean: 엔시티 드림; RR: Ensiti deurim) is the third sub-unit of the South Korean boy band NCT, formed by SM Entertainment in 2016. They were initially intended to be the teenaged unit of NCT with an admission-and-graduation system, in which members would leave after reaching age of majority (20 in Korean age reckoning, 19 internationally), prior to re-branding in 2020. The sub-unit debuted on August 25, 2016, with the single "Chewing Gum" and a lineup of seven members—Mark, Renjun, Jeno, Haechan, Jaemin, Chenle, and Jisung—whose average age was 15.6 years old. In late 2018, the group's leader, Mark, graduated from NCT Dream but returned in 2020 when the group began promoting as a fixed seven-member group. Mark then departed from the group on April 8, 2026.

Commercial success of their 2019 extended play (EP) We Boom made NCT Dream into one of the year's top 10 physical sellers domestically and earned them Bonsang awards at the 34th Golden Disc Awards and 2020 Seoul Music Awards. Their second and last record released as a sextet was their fourth Korean-language EP, Reload (2020), which accumulated over half a million pre-orders. NCT Dream achieved major commercial success with the release of their first studio album, Hot Sauce (2021), whose pre-orders surpassed 1.71 million copies. It became the best-selling album on the Gaon Chart in the first half of 2021 and was named Best Album at the 31st Seoul Music Awards.

Since their debut, NCT Dream have released four EPs, six singles and two studio albums and headlined one tour in Asia. Known for music reflecting youth and adolescence, growth, and the transition from innocence to rebellion, the sub-unit has been recognized internationally as one of the most notable teenaged artists of their time. They are the first and only Asian artist to appear three consecutive times on Billboard's "21 Under 21" list for their industry impact on sales, streaming and social media, placing at numbers 20, 13 and 19 from 2018 to 2020. NCT Dream were also included on Time's list of the "25 Most Influential Teens" of 2018.

== History ==
=== Pre-debut activities and formation ===
Prior to the group's debut, some of the members were already involved in the entertainment industry. Jeno had filmed various commercials as a child. Jisung was also previously a child actor with roles in films such as Boys, Be Curious (2012), and Go, Stop, Murder (2013) and a member of Poppin' Hyun Joon Kids Crew. Chenle was active in the Chinese music scene as a child singer; he released three albums, headlined a solo concert in China, and participated in Chinese programs, including China's Got Talent.

Mark was the first member to join SM Entertainment in 2012, after passing SM Global Auditions in Canada. Haechan was cast through SM Saturday Open Casting Audition in 2013, Jisung and Jeno were cast through the company's casting system, and Jaemin was street-cast by staff while doing volunteer work and successfully passed auditions. In July 2015, Renjun was cast through SM Global Auditions in China. Chenle was the last member to be cast, in 2016, five months before NCT Dream's debut.

Mark, Jeno, Haechan, Jaemin, and Jisung were previously part of SM Rookies, a pre-debut team of trainees under SM Entertainment. As part of SM Rookies, in October 2014, they appeared on the Mnet-produced Exo 90:2014, a show starring labelmates Exo, where they performed cover dances to K-pop songs from the 1990s. From July through December 2015, the five boys were Mouseketeers on Disney Channel Korea's The Mickey Mouse Club, where they performed music and dances, played games, and participated in skits. SM Rookies Boys eventually held their own showcase, the SMRookies Show, which took place in Seoul in September 2015 and later expanded to Bangkok, Thailand in February 2016.

NCT was first announced in January 2016 by Lee Soo-man at a presentation outlining plans for a group that would debut different sub-units around the world. Mark had previously debuted with the group's first unit, the rotational NCT U, on April 4, 2016. On July 7 of the same year, both Mark and Haechan debuted in NCT's second sub-unit, the Seoul-based NCT 127. They debuted again with five new members—Renjun, Jeno, Jaemin, Chenle and Jisung—as NCT Dream, the third sub-unit of NCT, announced on August 18, 2016.

=== 2016–2017: Debut and early years ===
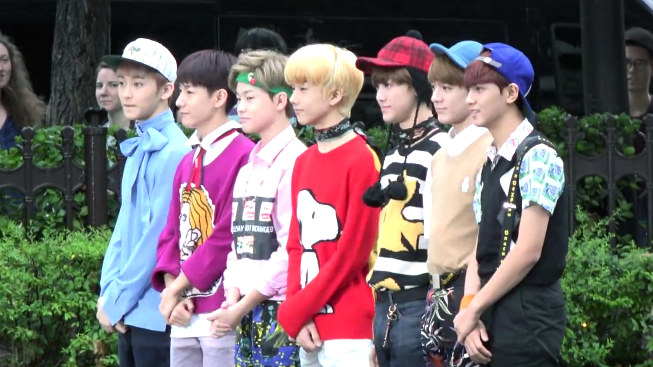
NCT Dream on Music Bank in 2016

NCT Dream released their debut single "Chewing Gum" on August 24, 2016, and held their debut stage on August 25 on M Countdown. The song peaked at number two on the Billboard World Digital Songs Sales chart and at number 23 on the Spotify Viral 50 chart upon release. The Korean and Mandarin versions of the song were later included in NCT Dream's first single album.

On February 1, 2017, SM Entertainment announced NCT Dream's first single album, although member Jaemin would not participate in order to recover from his herniated disc injury. The group's single album The First was released on February 9 with lead single "My First and Last". The album debuted at number one on the Gaon Album Chart. The sub-unit had their comeback stage on M Countdown, performing "My First and Last" and the B-side track "Dunk Shot". On February 14, NCT Dream won first place on the hundredth episode of The Show, marking the first music show win for any NCT unit.

In the same month, NCT Dream was appointed the official ambassadors for the 2017 FIFA U-20 World Cup, hosted in South Korea in the summer of 2017. On March 15, NCT Dream released the official song for the tournament, "Trigger the Fever", and performed it at different promotional events and at the opening ceremony of the U-20 World Cup.

NCT Dream released their first EP, We Young, on August 17, 2017. The group's first promotional performance for the EP was held on M Countdown. We Young peaked at number three on the Billboard World Albums chart in September.

NCT Dream released a Christmas single, "Joy", as part of the SM Station project on December 15, 2017.

=== 2018: International recognition and Mark's graduation ===
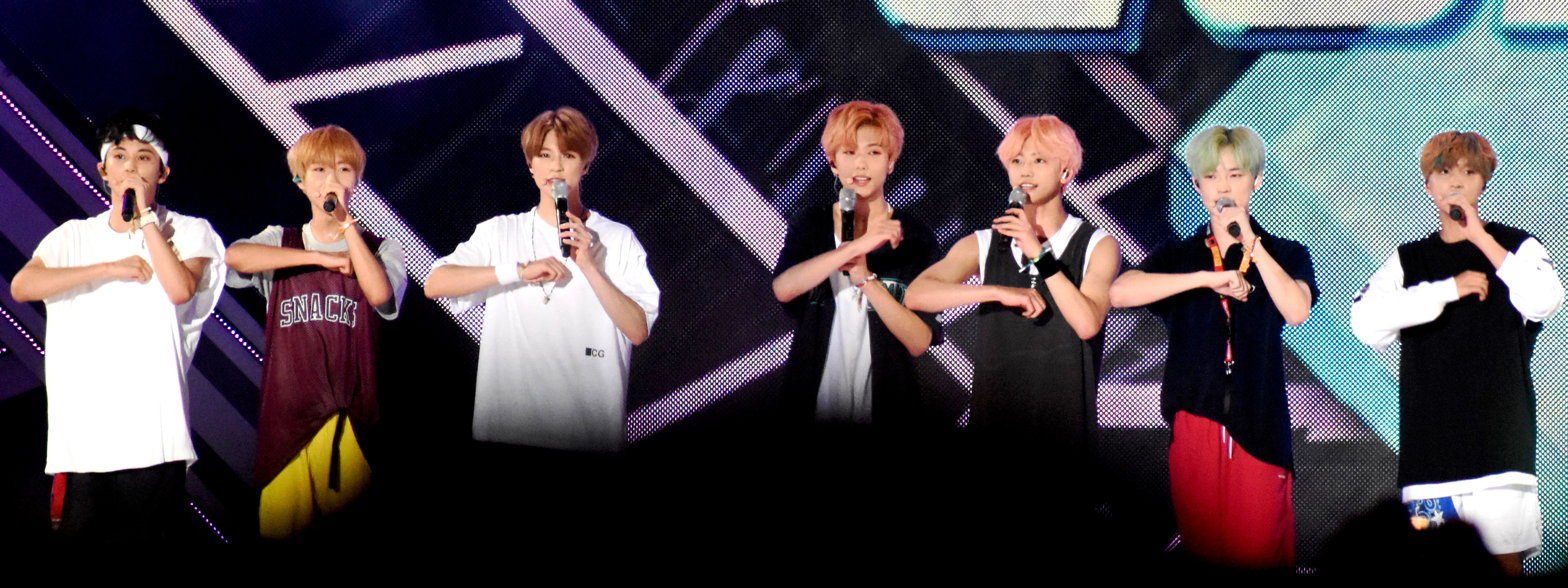
NCT Dream at the Incheon Airport Sky Festival in September 2018

NCT Dream promoted alongside NCT U and NCT 127 as NCT 2018 during the first quarter of 2018. On March 4, 2018, NCT Dream released the single "Go", which was included in NCT's first album NCT 2018 Empathy. The song marked a transition in the narrative of NCT Dream's music from the portrayal of innocence to the "more defiant attitude" of teenagers. It also marked the group's first comeback with Jaemin since their debut.

SM Entertainment announced in late August that NCT Dream would release an EP titled We Go Up in September. On August 27, it was confirmed that the album would be Mark's last comeback with the group before graduating in 2019 upon turning 19 years old, the age of majority in South Korea. The EP was released on September 3, 2018, alongside the lead single of the same name. We Go Up entered Billboard's World Albums chart at number five and its Heatseekers Albums chart at number seven, NCT Dream's then best sales week in the U.S. The album also topped iTunes Albums charts in 15 countries. NCT Dream was featured on the "21 Under 21 2018: Music's Next Generation" list by Billboard as the only Asian artist that year. All members were also listed on Time's 25 Most Influential Teens of 2018 list.

On December 19, it was announced Haechan would be taking a hiatus from the group due to injury, but he returned soon afterwards. On December 27, NCT Dream released their third single of the year, "Candle Light", for SM Station. The song was a message of gratitude and love, with lyrics written by Mark, the last song featuring the original seven members of the group before Mark officially graduated from the unit on December 31.

=== 2019: International collaborations and domestic breakthrough ===
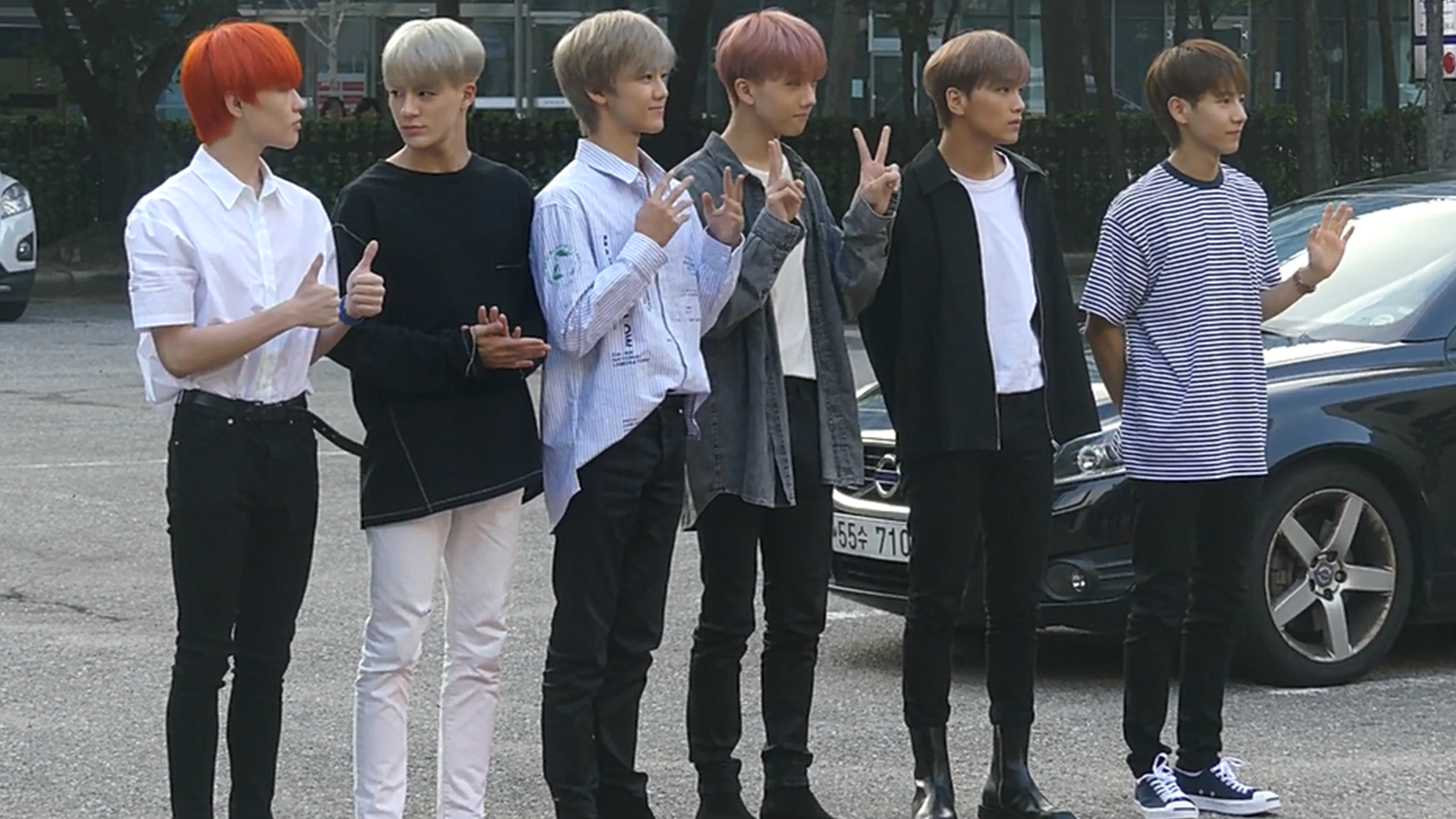
NCT Dream on Music Bank in August 2019

In March 2019, NCT Dream's Korean members Jeno, Jaemin and Jisung went to Malaysia to represent K-pop stars at the event "K-Wave & Halal Show", celebrating and meeting with South Korean President Moon Jae-in and the First Lady of South Korea.

On June 6, NCT Dream released "Don't Need Your Love", a collaborative single with English singer HRVY. The song showed a more mature side for the group, and they were credited for highlighting their maturing vocals. Haechan did not partake in the single due to ongoing activities with NCT 127. The song was released as part of SM Station Season 3.

In July, NCT Dream were named the first global ambassadors of the World Scout Foundation and released the English-language single "Fireflies", the proceeds of which were used to fund foundation activities in low-income countries. The group also performed at the 24th World Scout Jamboree in West Virginia, United States on July 23.

On July 26, NCT Dream released their third EP We Boom and its title track "Boom". The album sold more than 300,000 units after a month of release. It also debuted at number seven on the Billboard World Albums chart, and NCT Dream ranked at number three on the Billboard Social 50 Chart. NCT Dream received two wins for "Boom" on The Show on August 6 and August 20, respectively. The EP earned them Bonsang Awards at the 34th Golden Disc Awards and 2020 Seoul Music Awards.

In September, NCT Dream was included in Billboard's 21 Under 21 list for the second year in a row, being the first Asian artists to make the list for two consecutive years, this time rising to position thirteen.

In November, the group featured on American-Canadian boy band PrettyMuch's INTL:EP with the song "Up to You", its lyrics praised for promoting consent.

The group went on their first international concert tour, The Dream Show, starting with three dates in Seoul and two dates in Bangkok from November to December.

=== 2020: Japanese releases and reorganization ===
On January 22, NCT Dream released a Japan-exclusive compilation album titled The Dream, consisting of all previously released singles in their original Korean language. The album debuted atop the Oricon Albums Chart.

In early 2020, NCT Dream continued with their international tour The Dream Show, with shows in multiple cities in Japan as well as in Southeast Asian countries. Shows from February 2020 onwards were cancelled due to the COVID-19 pandemic.

As the topic of member graduation became more pressing since the year prior, SM Entertainment announced on April 14 that NCT Dream would release their fourth Korean EP, Reload, with the current six members Renjun, Jeno, Haechan, Jaemin, Chenle, and Jisung to mark a new change in concept. At the end of the album's promotion period, the graduation system would be abolished, and NCT Dream would continue with all seven members upon the return of Mark. NCT Dream would function as a fixed group and explore more diverse concepts with each release. The seven members would continue retain the name NCT Dream and possibly take part in other activities and NCT units in the future.

By April 28, one day before the EP's release and two weeks after its announcement, Reload garnered over 500,000 pre-orders, making it NCT Dream's most pre-ordered release to date. On April 29, NCT Dream released Reload with its lead single "Ridin'", an urban trap track with lyrics highlighting the aspirations of NCT Dream in their coming new path. The music video for "Ridin" was released on the same day. Upon release, the album topped the iTunes album chart in 49 countries, including the U.S., as well as topping the digital album sales chart of China's largest music site, QQ Music. In South Korea, "Ridin'" reached number one on its largest music site, Melon, making it the first track released by an NCT unit to top the chart. All five songs from the EP peaked within the top 10 on Melon digital chart. The following week, NCT Dream ranked number one on Billboard's Emerging Artists chart.

After the release of their fourth Korean EP, NCT Dream was the third group from SM Entertainment to hold a live online concert, titled "Beyond the Dream Show", as part of the world's first online-dedicated live concert series Beyond LIVE. The live concert was held on May 10.

NCT Dream joined the rest of NCT under the NCT 2020 moniker, promoting the group's second full-length album, the two-part NCT 2020 Resonance, which was released in October and November. By end of 2020, both parts of Resonance sold over 2.6 million copies, a new sales record for NCT. Included in the album is "Déjà Vu", performed by NCT Dream and Mark's first release with NCT Dream since its reorganization. Metro praised "Déjà Vu" for blending the youthful sound of NCT Dream with more edge and ranked it among the top 20 K-pop comebacks of 2020.

=== 2021–2022: Mainstream success and Japanese debut ===
On May 10, 2021, the group released their first studio album Hot Sauce, featuring the original seven members of the unit. The album consists of ten tracks, including the title track of the same name. Pre-orders for the album surpassed 1,716,571 copies, breaking their previous record for Reload with a 243% increase. The album topped the Gaon Album Chart, and "Hot Sauce" became the sub-unit's first single to peak at number one on the Gaon Digital Chart. On May 26, they earned the "double million sellers" title as the album sold more than two million copies. On June 28, 2021, the group released the repackage of their first studio album Hello Future, which contained three new tracks, including the lead single of the same name. Combined sales of Hot Sauce and Hello Future surpassed three million copies, earning the group their first "triple million seller" title.

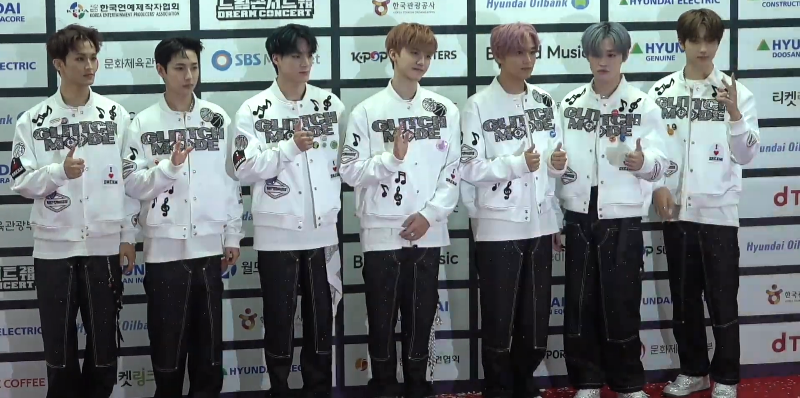
NCT Dream at Dream Concert Red Carpet in June 2022

On February 28, 2022, it was announced that the group would release their second studio album, Glitch Mode, on March 28, which contained eleven new tracks, including the lead single of the same name. Pre-orders for the album surpassed more than two million copies on the day of release, breaking their previous personal record of 1.71 million pre-orders for Hot Sauce. Glitch Mode recorded sales of 2,100,339 copies within one week, breaking the group's previous personal record of two million copies sold in 16 days for Hot Sauce. The album debuted at number 50 on the US Billboard 200 dated April 9, 2022, becoming NCT Dream's first entry on the chart. On May 30, 2022, the group released the repackage of their second studio album Beatbox, which contained four new tracks, including the lead single of the same name. Following the release of Glitch Mode and Beatbox, and a performance at KCON LA, the group embarked on The Dream Show 2: In A Dream world tour which ran from September 2022 through July 2023. A concert film, NCT Dream The Movie: In A Dream, was also shown in theatres in South Korea on November 30, in Japan on December 6, and in Singapore on November 30.

NCT Dream released a "winter special" extended play, Candy, on December 19. The tracks on the EP, including the lead single of the same name originally released by H.O.T., were made available on streaming services on December 16. The group released their first Japanese-language original single, "Best Friend Ever", on February 8, 2023, along with a Japanese version of "Glitch Mode" serving as B-side In its first week of release, "Best Friend Ever" topped the Oricon Weekly Singles Chart and the Billboard Japan Top Singles Sales Chart.

=== 2023–present: Subsequent releases and Mark's departure ===
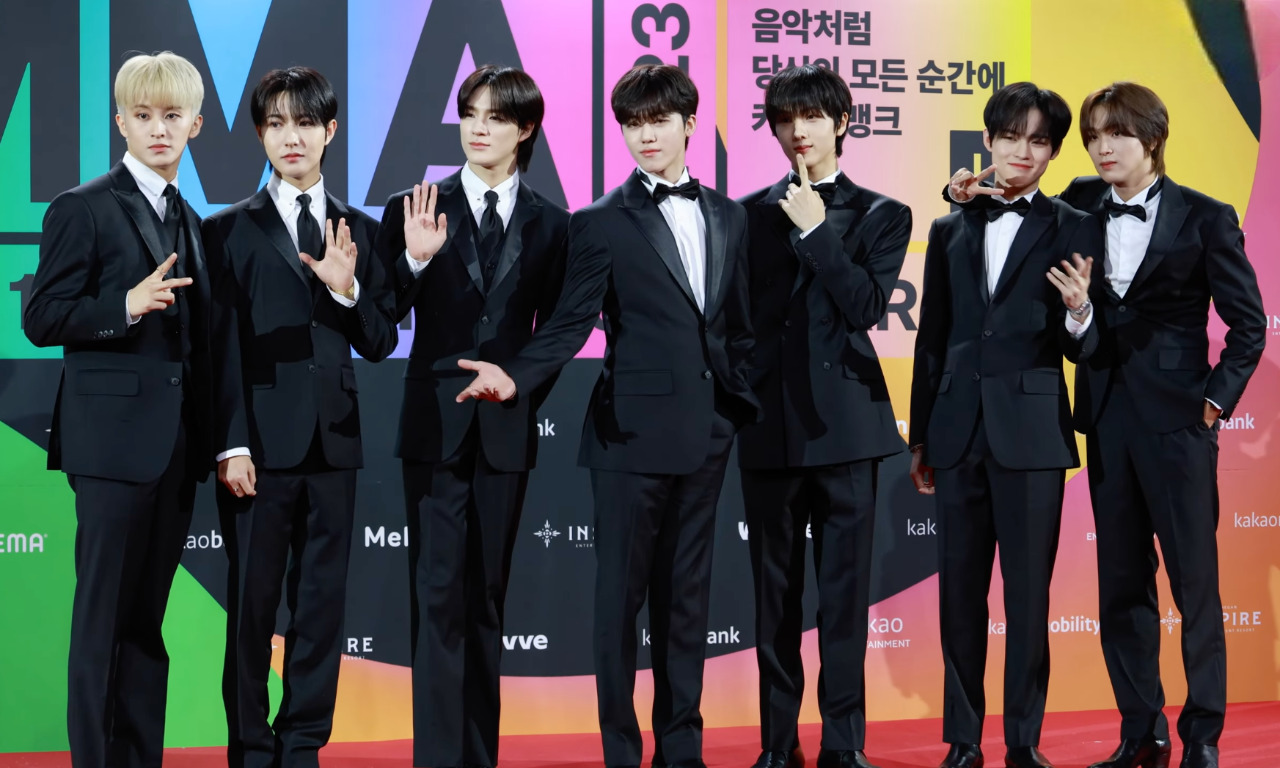
NCT Dream at the 2023 Melon Music Awards

On July 17, 2023, NCT Dream released their third studio album, ISTJ, which contains 10 tracks including the lead single, "Broken Melodies". They released a six-song EP on March 25, 2024, titled Dream()scape, pronounced "dream escape". A music video was released at the same time for the song "Smoothie", which depicts the band members playing the game Fruit Ninja. The band embarked on The Dream Show 3: Dream( )scape on May 3 in Seoul, traveling throughout Asia, North and South America, and Europe. NCT Dream released their debut English single "Rains in Heaven" on August 23. The track was later included on their fourth full-length album, Dreamscape, released on November 11. NCT Dream released their fifth studio album, Go Back to the Future, on July 14, 2025, with the tracks "BTTF" and "Chiller" released as double lead singles; the album is conceptually inspired by the Back to the Future film franchise.

In April 2026, SM announced that Mark would conclude his exclusive contract on April 8, departing from both the label and the group. Later that July, SM confirmed that Haechan had renewed his contract and would continue his activities with the group, followed in August by the remaining members of NCT Dream. In October 2026, NCT Dream announced that they would release their sixth studio album, Dream After Dream, on November 9. Supported by the single "Boogie Woogie", the album will contain ten tracks.

== Members ==
=== Current ===
- Renjun (런쥔)
- Jeno (제노)
- Haechan (해찬)
- Jaemin (재민)
- Chenle (천러)
- Jisung (지성)

=== Former ===
- Mark (마크) (Note: Mark left NCT Dream at the end of 2018 as a result of the group's previous admission-graduation system. Following the termination of this system, Mark rejoined the group at the end of 2020.) – former leader

== Discography ==
- Hot Sauce (2021)
- Glitch Mode (2022)
- ISTJ (2023)
- Dreamscape (2024)
- Go Back to the Future (2025)
- Dream After Dream (2026)

== Filmography ==
- NCT Dream The Movie: In A Dream (2022)
- NCT Dream Mystery Lab: Dream()scape (2024)

== Tours ==
- The Dream Show (2019–2020)
- The Dream Show 2: In A Dream (2022–2023)
- The Dream Show 3: Dream( )scape (2024)
- The Dream Show 4: Dream the Future (2025-2026)
