= Reload (EP) =

- Digital and Ridin' version cover

EP by NCT Dream
- Released: April 29, 2020
- Genre: Trap; pop; hip hop; R&B; EDM
- Length: 17:03
- Label: SM; Dreamus

NCT Dream chronology
The Dream (2020)	Reload (2020)	Hot Sauce (2021)

NCT chronology
Neo Zone (2020)	Reload (2020)	Awaken the World (2020)

Singles from Reload
- 1. "Ridin'" Released: April 29, 2020

Reload is the fourth extended play (EP) by South Korean boy band NCT Dream, the third sub-unit of the South Korean boy band NCT. It was released on April 29, 2020, by SM Entertainment and distributed by Dreamus. It marked the group's last record as a six-member unit following the termination of the age-based graduation system that was operated in the group. The album contains five songs including the lead single "Ridin'". Musically, the album incorporates several genres including trap, pop, hip hop, R&B and EDM. A music video for the lead single "Ridin'" was released to accompany the album release.

Upon release, the album debuted at number one on South Korea's Gaon Album Chart and became the second best-selling album of April 2020. It also charted at number two on Japan's Oricon Albums Chart and appeared on the US World Albums chart at number 7. The band further topped the Billboard Emerging Artists chart for the first time. In June 2020, the album was certified double platinum by the Korea Music Content Association (KMCA).

Reload received generally favourable reviews from music critics, who praised the band's experimentation with diverse genres without losing their signature style. In order to promote the record, NCT Dream appeared on several music programs of South Korea, such as Music Bank, Show! Music Core and Inkigayo, where they performed material from the album. The band also performed on the world's first paid online concert series Beyond LIVE.

== Background and release ==
Following the release of Japanese compilation album The Dream, NCT Dream went on a concert tour, The Dream Show which began on January 26, 2020, in Japan. On April 14, SM Entertainment announced the release of the band's upcoming extended play Reload with six current members Renjun, Jeno, Haechan, Jaemin, Chenle and Jisung, by posting a teaser photo on the band's official website. It marked the group's last record as a six-member unit following the termination of the age-based graduation system that was operated in the group. The label further stated that when the promotions for the new album concludes, and NCT member Mark will rejoin the Dream sub-unit to bring back the original line-up of seven members. The band released a crew video and an album teaser photo on April 20 and 21. A poster schedule was released on April 21, containing multiple dates for the sequential release of four sets of track videos, video cuts, poster images, photo teasers and music video teasers. From April 22 to 27, the band released poster images and teaser videos for the album tracks through the band's official SNS accounts. On April 28, the music video teaser for the lead single, "Ridin'" was released. The album was released on April 29, 2020, in both CD and digital formats. An accompanying music video for "Ridin" was uploaded to the label's official YouTube channel, in conjunction with the album release. The visual depicts the band dancing and posing inside a neon-lit, graffiti-covered "industrial" building, surrounded by colourful polished bikes and cars, which goes in line with the song's title. They maintained their signature "energetic choreography" in the dance-heavy video.

== Composition ==
Reload opens with the lead single "Ridin'" which has lyrics written by Jeong Jeong-won and Rick Bridges, while produced solely by Moonshine. "Ridin'" has been described as an urban trap and pop song featuring a heavy bassline and an intense beat. The song is driven by bare instrumentals over an electronic rhythm and a distant siren. Lyrically, the song detail the passion and ambition to reload a new path. "Quiet Down" is an EDM and hip hop song featuring "buzzing" synth loop of industrial music style. The chorus incorporates vocal harmonies and a heavy synth chord progression as opposed to the minimalist sound of the rap verses. "7 Days" is an R&B song with pitch-shifting keyboard chords that derives from J-pop genre. The track also builds with lo-fi elements. "Love Again" is a hybrid of R&B and hip hop genres with '90s elements and serves as a part of the band's "love" trilogy series. Throughout the track, the group chant and sing in call and response over a "steady-dance beat." The song also features a high-end synth line and some DJ-esque scratching. "Puzzle Piece" is an acoustic ballad featuring guitar strums and soft vocals. The song is further instrumented by "palm slaps" and shifting rhythm. The track was compared to the musical style of Ed Sheeran. It was co-written by band members Jeno and Jaemin, with Josh Cumbee and Andrew Allen serving as producers.

== Promotion ==
A few hours prior to the album release, NCT Dream held a live session on Naver's V Live app to discuss the album. On April 30, the band shared their first performance of "Ridin'" at 20:00 KST through their official YouTube channel, as a part of the video-exclusive content series "NCT DREAM The Stage". The band promoted the album with performances of "Ridin'" and "Quiet Down" on various music shows, starting with KBS's Music Bank on May 1. The band also promoted the songs on MBC's Show! Music Core and SBS's Inkigayo. In the second week of promotion, "Ridin'" won first place on Music Bank on May 8. On May 10, the band performed songs from the album on "NCT Dream – Beyond the Dream Show", the third segment of Beyond LIVE, world's first paid online concert launched by SM Entertainment and Naver. The group also appeared as guests on the May 5 episode of SBS Power FM Cultwo Show.

== Reception ==
Reviewing for South China Morning Post, Chris Gillett praised the band's ability to experiment with diverse sounds and favoured the band's musical direction. He wrote, "Reload shows NCT Dream giving themselves a bit of a reboot on their fourth mini-album, and it seems to have paid off." Yoon Sang-geun of Star News described "Ridin'" as "energetic" and "dynamic", "7 days" as "refreshing" and "Puzzle Piece" as exuding warm emotions. Overall, Yoon said the album "showed the youth swap of NCT DREAM. The dynamic tempo adjustment and color in the visual beauty extracted freely made NCT DREAM more colorful. The sound and vocal lines also did not lose their trendiness, and provided a hopeful message and powerful military service without departing from the team chemistry pursued by the existing NCT."

In South Korea, the album debuted at number one the Gaon Album Chart for the issue date of May 2, 2020. The album sold 259,422 physical copies in two days of tracking and peaked at number two on the Gaon Monthly Album Chart for the month of April 2020. In June 2020, the album received a double platinum certification from the Korea Music Content Association (KMCA), denoting 500,000 shipments. The title track "Ridin'" reached number one on Korea's largest music site Melon, making it the first track released by an NCT unit to top the chart. All five songs from the EP peaked within the top 10 on Melon digital chart. The album entered the US World Albums chart at number 7 for the issue date of May 7, 2020, with 2,000 equivalent album units. By doing so, the band topped the Billboard Emerging Artists chart for the first time. In Japan, the album debuted at number 36 on the Oricon Combined Albums Chart and peaked at number 3 in its second week. It also debuted at number 7 on the Oricon Digital Album chart with 922 downloads. It also debuted and peaked at number 11 on Billboard Japan's Hot Albums and at number 6 on Top Download Albums. The album debuted at number 2 on the Oricon Albums Chart with 5,768 physical copies sold in its first week. In addition, the album topped the iTunes album chart in 49 countries worldwide including the U.S. as well as topping China's largest music site QQ digital album sales chart.

== Track listing ==
Reload track listing
No.	Title	Lyrics	Music	Arrangement	Length
1.	"Ridin'"	Jang Jeong-won; Rick Bridges	Jonatan Gusmark (Moonshine); Ludvig Evers (Moonshine); Julien Maurice Moore; Jeremy "Tay" Jasper; Adrian McKinnon; Darius Martin; Hautboi Rich	Moonshine	3:21
2.	"Quiet Down"	Jang Han-bit	Timothy "BOS" Bullock; Jeremy "Tay" Jasper; Sara Forsberg; Jordain Johnson; Zachary Chicoine	Timothy "BOS" Bullock	3:08
3.	"7 Days" (내게 말해줘; Naege malhaejwo; 'Tell Me')	Kang Eun-jung	Henrik Bryld Wolsing; Castle; minGtion (ADC Music)	Easthigh; minGtion (ADC Music)	3:17
4.	"Love Again" (사랑은 또다시; Sarangeun ttodasi)	Shin Jin-hye; Jung Mul-hwa	Mike Daley; Mitchell Owens; Jeff Lewis; Micky Blue	Mike Daley; Mitchell Owens	3:30
5.	"Puzzle Piece" (너의 자리; Neoui jari; 'Your Place')	Hwang Yoo-bin; Jeno; Jaemin	Josh Cumbee; Andrew Allen	Josh Cumbee; Andrew Allen	3:47
Total length:					17:30

== Charts ==
=== Weekly charts ===
Chart (2020)	Peak position
Hungarian Albums (MAHASZ)	39
Japanese Albums (Oricon)	2
Japan Hot Albums (Billboard Japan)	11
Polish Albums (ZPAV)	29
South Korean Album (Gaon)	1
US World Albums (Billboard)	7

=== Year-end charts ===
Chart (2020)	Peak position
South Korean Albums (Gaon)	11

== Certifications ==
Certifications for Reload
Region	Certification	Certified units/sales
South Korea (KMCA)	2× Platinum	500,000^{^}
^{^} Shipments figures based on certification alone.

== Release history ==
Release formats for Reload
Region	Date	Format	Distributor	Ref.
Various	April 29, 2020	Digital download	SM Entertainment	
South Korea	April 29, 2020	Digital download	SM Entertainment	
South Korea	April 29, 2020	CD	SM Entertainment; Dreamus	

== See also ==
- List of Gaon Album Chart number ones of 2020
