= Dream()scape =

- Digital cover

EP by NCT Dream
- Released: March 25, 2024
- Genres: Hip-hop; R&B
- Length: 18:30
- Language: Korean
- Labels: SM; Kakao

NCT Dream chronology
| ISTJ (2023) | Dream()scape (2024) | Dreamscape (2024) |

NCT chronology
| Be There for Me (2023) | Dream()scape (2024) | Give Me That (2024) |

Singles from Dream()scape
- 1. "Smoothie" Released: March 25, 2024

Dream()scape (pronounced Dreamescape) is the fifth Extended play (EP) by South Korean boy band NCT Dream. Released on March 25, 2024, by SM Entertainment through Kakao Entertainment, the album consists of 6 tracks, including the lead single, "Smoothie".

== Background and release ==
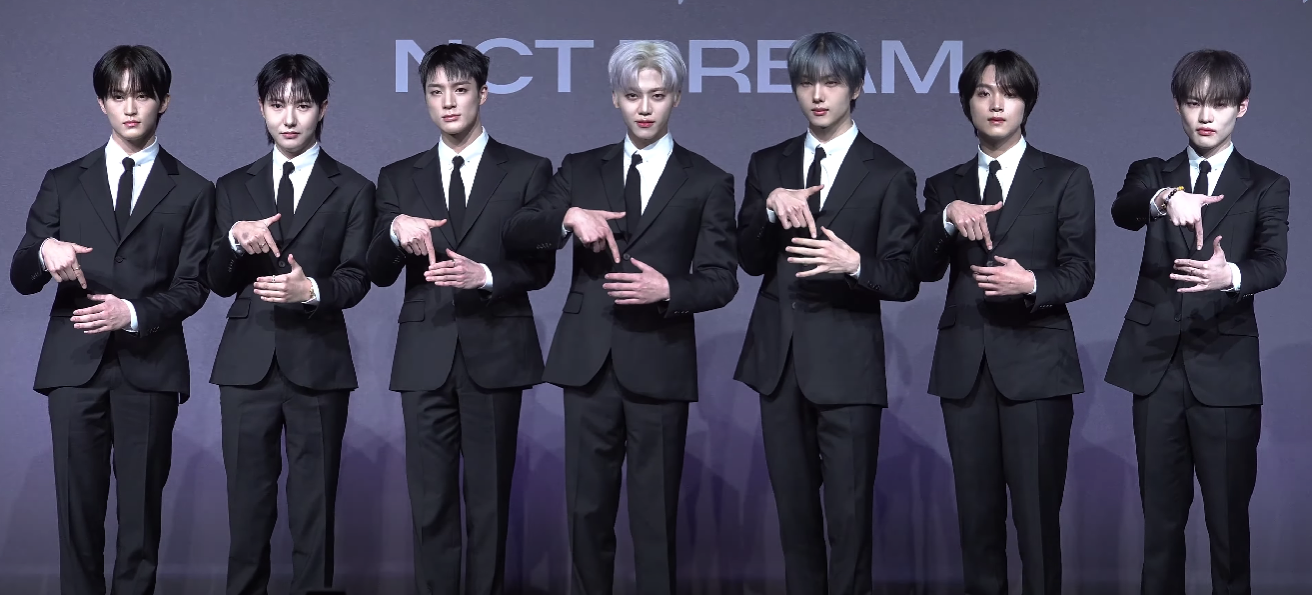
NCT Dream at a press conference for Dream()scape in March 2024

On March 5, 2024, SM Entertainment announced that NCT Dream would be releasing their sixth EP, Dream()scape on March 25, releasing a teaser image. On March 24, a music video teaser for the lead single, "Smoothie" was released on the SMTOWN YouTube channel. Between March 11 and 15, five short movie-like trailers, titled "()Scape Film" were released.

A music video for "Smoothie" was also released on March 25, featuring band members playing a real-life version of Fruit Ninja. On the same day, the band held a press event in Seoul for the album.

In support of the EP, the band embarked on "The Dream Show 3: Dream()scape" world tour in May.

== Critical reception ==
Dream()scape received mixed reviews from critics. NME's Tássia Assis gave the EP three stars out of five, criticizing "Smoothie" as being "a predictable, borderline-exasperating track", while "the rest of the album is much more creative, cohesive and enjoyable". Cristina Jaleru of the Associated Press wrote that the EP "comes in and out of focus through a combination of tempo changes, innovative sounds [...] and catchy yet somehow forgettable hooks".

== Accolades ==
=== Listicles ===
Name of publisher, year listed, name of listicle, and placement
| Publisher | Year | Listicle | Placement | Ref. |
|---|---|---|---|---|
| Billboard | 2024 | The 20 Best K-Pop Albums of 2024 (So Far): Staff Picks | 14th | |

== Track listing ==
Dream()scape track listing
| No. | Title | Lyrics | Music | Arrangement | Length |
|---|---|---|---|---|---|
| 1. | "Icantfeelanything" | Ellie Suh (153/Joombas) | Patrick "J. Que" Smith; Jason Hahs; David Wilson; August 08 | dwilly | 2:12 |
| 2. | "Smoothie" | Na Do-yeon (153/Joombas); Bang Hae-hyeon | Harold "Alawn" Philippon; Benji Bae; Robbie Jay | Alawn | 3:08 |
| 3. | "Box" | Cha Ri (153/Joombas); Mark | Greg Bonnick; Hayden Chapman; Danny Shah; Taet Chesterton; Mark | LDN Noise | 2:50 |
| 4. | "Carat Cake" | Jo Yoon-kyung | Dan Gleyzer; Tony Ferrari | Dan Gleyzer | 2:32 |
| 5. | "Unknown" | Lee Seu-ran; Mark; Jeno | Nicklas Jarelius Persson; William Segerdahl; Ninos Hanna; Mark; Jeno | Niklas Jarelius Persson; William Segerdahl | 3:33 |
| 6. | "Breathing" (Korean: 숨; RR: Sum; lit. 'Breath') | Woo Seung-yeon (153/Joombas); Mark; Jeno; Jaemin; Jisung | Micky Blue; Realmeee; Patrick Liney; Cosmo Liney; Etham Basden; Mark; Jeno; Jaemin; Jisung | Cosmo's Midnight | 4:13 |
| Total length: | | | | | 18:30 |

== Credits ==
=== Locations ===
- SM Wavelet Studio – recording (tracks 1–2, 4), digital editing (track 1)
- SM Yellow Tail Studio – recording (all tracks), digital editing (tracks 2, 4–5)
- SM Droplet Studio – recording (tracks 1, 3–6), engineering for mix (track 3)
- SM Blue Cup Studio – mixing (tracks 1–2)
- SM Aube Studio – recording (tracks 2, 6), digital editing (track 6), engineering for mix (track 6)
- SM Concert Hall Studio – mixing (track 3)
- SM Big Shot Studio – mixing (track 4)
- Doobdoob Studio – recording (tracks 5–6), digital editing (track 3)
- SM Blue Ocean Studio – mixing (track 5)
- SM Starlight Studio – digital editing, mixing (track 6)
- 821 Sound – mastering (all tracks)

=== Personnel ===
- NCT Dream – vocals
  - Mark – background vocals (tracks 4–5)
  - Renjun – background vocals (tracks 2–4)
  - Jeno – background vocals (track 5)
  - Haechan – background vocals (tracks 1–2, 4–5)
  - Jaemin – background vocals (tracks 4, 6)
  - Chenle – background vocals (tracks 1–5)
  - Jisung – background vocals (tracks 3–6)
- Young Chance – vocal directing (tracks 1–2, 4–5)
- Ju Chan-yang (Pollen) – vocal directing (tracks 1–4), background vocals (track 6)
- David "Dwilly" Wilson – background vocals (track 1)
- Kang Eun-ji – recording (tracks 1, 4), digital editing (track 1)
- Noh Min-ji – recording (all tracks), digital editing (tracks 2, 4–5)
- Kim Joo-hyun – recording (all tracks), engineering for mix (track 3)
- Jung Eui-seok – mixing (tracks 1–2)
- Kim Hyo-joon – recording (tracks 2, 6), digital editing (track 6), engineering for mix (track 6)
- Eugene Kwon – digital editing (track 3)
- Nam Koong-jin – mixing (track 3)
- Dan Gleyzer – background vocals (track 4)
- Lee Min-kyu – mixing (track 4)
- Mingtion – vocal directing (tracks 5–6)
- Jang Woo-young – recording (tracks 5–6)
- Kim Cheol-sun – mixing (track 5)
- Jeong Yoo-ra – digital editing, mixing (track 6)
- Kwon Nam-woo – mastering

== Charts ==
=== Album ===
==== Weekly charts ====
Weekly chart performance for Dream()scape
| Chart (2024) | Peak position |
|---|---|
| Austrian Albums (Ö3 Austria) | 55 |
| Belgian Albums (Ultratop Flanders) | 147 |
| Belgian Albums (Ultratop Wallonia) | 160 |
| Croatian International Albums (HDU) | 4 |
| French Albums (SNEP) | 51 |
| Greek Albums (IFPI) | 39 |
| Japanese Albums (Oricon) | 2 |
| Japanese Combined Albums (Oricon) | 2 |
| Japanese Hot Albums (Billboard Japan) | 2 |
| South Korean Albums (Circle) | 1 |
| Swiss Albums (Schweizer Hitparade) | 58 |
| US Top Album Sales (Billboard) | 6 |
| US Independent Albums (Billboard) | 41 |
| US World Albums (Billboard) | 4 |

==== Monthly charts ====
Monthly chart performance for Dream()scape
| Chart (2024) | Position |
|---|---|
| Japanese Albums (Oricon) | 4 |
| South Korean Albums (Circle) | 1 |

=== Year-end charts ===
Year-end chart performance for Dream()scape
| Chart (2024) | Position |
|---|---|
| Japanese Albums (Oricon) | 63 |
| Japanese Hot Albums (Billboard Japan) | 76 |
| South Korean Albums (Circle) | 5 |

=== Single ===
==== Weekly charts ====
Weekly chart performance for "Smoothie"
| Chart (2024) | Peak position |
|---|---|
| China Korean Songs (TME) | 1 |
| Japan (Japan Hot 100) | 57 |
| Japan Combined Singles (Oricon) | 43 |
| South Korea (Circle) | 3 |
| UK Singles Downloads (Official Charts) | 17 |
| UK Singles Sales (OCC) | 18 |

== Certifications ==
Certifications for Dream()scape
| Region | Certification | Certified units/sales |
|---|---|---|
| South Korea (KMCA) | 2× Million | 2,000,000^{^} |
^{^} Shipments figures based on certification alone.

== Accolades ==
Music program awards for Dream()scape
| Song | Program | Date | Ref. |
|---|---|---|---|
| "Smoothie" | Show Champion | April 3, 2024 | |
| "Smoothie" | M Countdown | April 4, 2024 | |
| "Smoothie" | Music Bank | April 5, 2024 | |
| "Smoothie" | Show! Music Core | April 6, 2024 | |
