= Ridin' (NCT Dream song) =

2021 single by NCT Dream

- iScreaM project cover

Single by NCT Dream

from the EP Reload
- Released: April 29, 2020
- Genre: Hip hop
- Length: 3:21
- Label: SM Entertainment
- Composers: Jonatan Gusmark; Ludvig Evers; Maurice Moore; Jeremy "Tay" Jasper; Adrian McKinnon; Darius Martin; Hautboi Rich
- Lyricists: Jang Jeong-won (Jam Factory); Rick Bridges
- Producer: Moonshine

NCT Dream singles chronology
"Boom" (2019)	"Ridin'" (2020)	"Hot Sauce" (2021)

NCT singles chronology
"Kick It" (2020)	"Ridin'" (2020)	"Punch" (2020)

Music video
- "Ridin'" on YouTube

"Ridin'" is a song recorded by South Korean boy group NCT Dream for their fourth extended play Reload (2020). The song was released by SM Entertainment on April 29, 2020, as the album's lead single.

== Composition ==
The song was produced by Moonshine, and written by Jam Factory's Jang Jeong-won, Rick Bridges, Moonshine, Maurice Moore, Jeremy “Tay” Jasper, Adrian Mckinnon, Darius Martin and Hautboi Rich.

== Commercial performance ==
"Ridin'" debuted at number 25 on the Gaon Digital Chart for the week ending May 2, 2020. In its second week, the song achieved a new peak at number 17, making it the group's highest-charting song to date. It also debuted at number 19 on the US World Digital Song Sales chart, marking the group's ninth entry. In its second week, the song achieved a new peak at number 18.

== Accolades ==
"Ridin" received one music program award on the May 8, 2020, broadcast of Music Bank.

== Credits and personnel ==
Credits adapted from the EP's liner notes.

=== Studio ===
- SM SSAM Studio – recording
- doobdoob Studio – recording, digital editing
- SM Yellow Tail Studio – engineered for mix
- SM Blue Cup Studio – mixing
- 821 Sound – mastering

=== Personnel ===
- SM Entertainment – executive producer
- Lee Soo-man – producer
- Lee Sung-soo – production director, executive supervisor
- Tak Young-jun – executive supervisor
- NCT Dream – vocals
  - Haechan – background vocals
- Jang Jeong-won (Jam Factory) – lyrics
- Rick Bridges – lyrics
- Jonatan Gusmark (Moonshine) – producer, composition, arrangement
- Ludvig Evers (Moonshine) – producer, composition, arrangement
- Maurice Moore – composition
- Darius Martin – composition
- Hautboi Rich – composition
- Jeremy "Tay" Jasper – composition
- Adrian McKinnon – composition
- Yoo Young-jin – arrangement, background vocals, music and sound supervisor
- Deez – vocal directing
- Byun Jang-moon – background vocals
- Kang Eun-ji – recording
- Eugene Kwon – recording
- Jang Woo-young – digital editing
- Noh Min-ji – engineered for mix
- Jung Eui-seok – mixing
- Kwon Nam-woo – mastering

== Charts ==
Chart (2020)	Peak position
South Korea (Gaon)	17
US World Digital Song Sales (Billboard)	18

== See also ==
- List of Music Bank Chart winners (2020)
