= The Dream Show 2: In A Dream =

2022–2023 concert tour by NCT Dream

- World tour by NCT Dream
- Associated album: Hot Sauce; Glitch Mode; Candy
- Start date: September 8, 2022
- End date: July 11, 2023
- Legs: 5
- No. of shows: 41

NCT Dream concert chronology
- Beyond the Dream Show (2020); The Dream Show 2: In A Dream (2022–2023); The Dream Show 3: Dream( )scape (2024)

The Dream Show 2: In A Dream (stylized as NCT DREAM TOUR 'THE DREAM SHOW2 : In A DREAM') was the first worldwide concert tour and second tour overall (Note: When combined with their previous concert) headlined by NCT Dream, the third sub-unit of a South Korean boy group NCT, in support of their first studio album Hot Sauce (2021), and the second studio album Glitch Mode (2022). The tour kicked off in September 2022 and concluded in July 2023, it was the group's first in-person concert tour in three years.

== Background ==
NCT Dream planned to hold concerts at the Gocheok Sky Dome in Seoul from July 29 to 31, but cancelled them after members Mark and Renjun tested positive for COVID-19. The event was rescheduled on September 8 and 9 at the Jamsil Olympic Stadium, nearly four times larger in capacity than the original venue, and served as the opening performance to their second tour, The Dream Show 2: In A Dream. It marked the group's first concert featuring all seven members since their debut in 2016. The second show was broadcast on the platform Beyond Live. The tour will continue in Japan with five concerts in Nagoya, Yokohama and Fukuoka. The concert held in Yokohama on November 27 was broadcast on Beyond Live.

On February 15, 2023, SM Entertainment announced new dates, with additional legs in the United States, Latin America, Europe, and Asia from March to May 2023. It will be NCT Dream's first tour outside Asia. They ended their tour in Mexico after visiting 26 cities.

== Reception ==
Writing for NME, Lucy Ford gave four out of five stars for the London show, saying that "This isn't the NCT Dream we were first introduced to, this is NCT Dream grown up and ready to be known as such.".

== Setlist ==
Seoul
1. "Glitch Mode"
2. "Countdown 3, 2, 1"
3. "STRONGER"
4. "Dreaming"
5. "Déjà Vu"
6. "My First and Last"
7. "Bye My First..."
8. "Love Again"
9. "To My First"
10. "Sorry, Heart"
11. "Puzzle Piece"
12. "Chewing Gum"
13. "ANL"
14. "Dive Into You"
15. "Irreplaceable"
16. "Saturday Drip"
17. "Quiet Down"
18. "Better Than Gold"
19. "Life is Still Going On"
20. "Diggity"
21. "Fire Alarm"
22. "'Ridin' (Will Not Fear Remix)"
23. "GO"
24. "BOOM"
25. "Hello Future"
26. "We Go Up"
27. "Trigger The Fever"
28. "Hot Sauce"

Encore

29. "Beatbox"
30. "My Youth"
31. "Dear DREAM"
32. "On The Way" ^{(day 1)} / "Rainbow" ^{(day 2)}
33. "Walk You Home"
Japan (2022)
1. "Glitch Mode" (Japanese ver.)
2. "Countdown (3, 2, 1)"
3. "STRONGER"
4. "Dreaming"
5. "Déjà Vu"
6. "My First and Last"
7. "Bye My First..."
8. "Love Again"
9. "To My First"
10. "Sorry, Heart"
11. "Puzzle Piece"
12. "Chewing Gum"
13. "ANL"
14. "Dive Into You"
15. "Irreplaceable"
16. "Saturday Drip"
17. "Quiet Down"
18. "Better Than Gold"
19. "Life is Still Going On"
20. "Diggity"
21. "'Ridin' (Will Not Fear Remix)"
22. "BOOM"
23. "Hello Future"
24. "We Go Up"
25. "Trigger The Fever"
26. "Hot Sauce"

Encore

27. "Beatbox"
28. "Candle Light"
29. "My Youth" ^{(Yokohama - day 1)} / "Dear DREAM" ^{(Yokohama - day 2)} / "Never Goodbye" ^{(Yokohama - day 3)}
30. "Walk You Home"
Osaka, Japan (2023)
1. "Glitch Mode" (Japanese ver.)
2. "Countdown (3, 2, 1)"
3. "STRONGER"
4. "Dreaming"
5. "Déjà Vu"
6. "My First and Last"
7. "Bye My First..."
8. "Love Again"
9. "To My First"
10. "Sorry, Heart"
11. "Puzzle Piece"
12. "Chewing Gum"
13. "ANL"
14. "Dive Into You"
15. "Irreplaceable"
16. "Saturday Drip"
17. "Quiet Down"
18. "Better Than Gold"
19. "Life is Still Going On"
20. "Diggity"
21. "Ridin'"
22. "Fire Alarm"
23. "BOOM"
24. "Hello Future"
25. "Best Friend Ever"
26. "Trigger The Fever"
27. "Hot Sauce"

Encore

28. "Beatbox"
29. "Candle Light"
30. "My Youth" ^{(day 1)} / "Never Goodbye" ^{(day 2)} / "Dear DREAM" ^{(day 3)}
31. "Walk You Home"
32. "Candy"
Asia / Europe / United States
1. "Glitch Mode"
2. "Countdown (3, 2, 1)"
3. "STRONGER"
4. "Dreaming"
5. "Déjà Vu"
6. "My First and Last"
7. "Bye My First..."
8. "Love Again"
9. "To My First"
10. "Sorry, Heart"
11. "Puzzle Piece"
12. "Chewing Gum"
13. "ANL"
14. "Dive Into You"
15. "Irreplaceable"
16. "Saturday Drip"
17. "Quiet Down"
18. "Better Than Gold"
19. "Diggity"
20. "Ridin'"
21. "BOOM"
22. "Hello Future"
23. "We Go Up"
24. "Trigger The Fever"
25. "Hot Sauce"

Encore

26. "Beatbox" ^{(Europe & United States - English ver.)}
27. "My Youth"
28. "Walk You Home"
29. "Candy"
Seoul (Encore)
1. "Déjà Vu"
2. "Countdown (3, 2, 1)"
3. "STRONGER"
4. "Dreaming"
5. "Glitch Mode"
6. "My First and Last"
7. "Bye My First..."
8. "Love Again"
9. "To My First"
10. "Sorry, Heart"
11. "Puzzle Piece"
12. "Chewing Gum"
13. "ANL"
14. "Dive Into You"
15. "Saturday Drip"
16. "Quiet Down"
17. "Drippin'"
18. "Better Than Gold"
19. "Life is Still Going On"
20. "Fire Alarm"
21. "Ridin'"
22. "Hot Sauce"
23. "Trigger The Fever"

Encore

24. "Hello Future"
25. "Rewind"
26. "Dear DREAM"
27. "Graduation"
28. "Candy"
Latin America
1. "Glitch Mode"
2. "Countdown (3, 2, 1)"
3. "STRONGER"
4. "Dreaming"
5. "Déjà Vu"
6. "My First and Last"
7. "Bye My First..."
8. "Love Again"
9. "To My First"
10. "Sorry, Heart"
11. "Puzzle Piece"
12. "Chewing Gum"
13. "ANL"
14. "Dive Into You"
15. "Irreplaceable"
16. "Saturday Drip"
17. "Better Than Gold"
18. "Diggity"
19. "Ridin'"
20. "BOOM"
21. "Hello Future"
22. "Trigger The Fever"
23. "Hot Sauce"

Encore

24. "Beatbox"
25. "My Youth"
26. "Walk You Home"
27. "Candy"

== Concert film ==
NCT Dream The Movie: In A Dream is a concert film directed by Oh Yoon-dong. Starring NCT Dream, it documents their two-day opening concert held in Seoul. It contains behind-the-scenes and backstage footage, as well as interviews.

=== Release and reception ===
A trailer was released on November 7, 2022. The film was released on 103 screens on November 30, 2022, in South Korea. It was available in several formats, such as ScreenX, 4DX, and 4DX Screen in CGV cinemas.

It was released in theatres on December 6 in Japan. The production company, Dream Maker Entertainment, announced that the film would be released in 78 countries around the world, including United States.

The film grossed US$4.5 million worldwide at the box office in its opening week. In South Korea, it opened at number nine at the box office and recorded 50,000 viewers in five days for a total of US$825,000. Prior to its release, it ranked at number one for ticket reservation according to the Korean Film Council.

== Shows ==
List of concerts showing date, city, country, venue, and attendance
Date	City	Country	Venue	Attendance
September 8, 2022	Seoul	South Korea	Jamsil Olympic Stadium; Beyond Live (Note: September 9 only.)	—
September 9, 2022	Seoul	South Korea	Jamsil Olympic Stadium; Beyond Live	—
November 23, 2022	Nagoya	Japan	Nippon Gaishi Hall	174,000
November 26, 2022	Yokohama	Japan	Yokohama Arena; Beyond Live (Note: November 27 only.)	174,000
November 27, 2022	Yokohama	Japan	Yokohama Arena; Beyond Live	174,000
November 28, 2022	Yokohama	Japan	Yokohama Arena; Beyond Live	174,000
December 1, 2022	Fukuoka	Japan	Marine Messe Fukuoka	174,000
February 17, 2023	Osaka	Japan	Kyocera Dome Osaka; Beyond Live (Note: February 19 only.)	174,000
February 18, 2023	Osaka	Japan	Kyocera Dome Osaka; Beyond Live	174,000
February 19, 2023	Osaka	Japan	Kyocera Dome Osaka; Beyond Live	174,000
March 4, 2023	Jakarta	Indonesia	Indonesia Convention Exhibition	36,000
March 5, 2023	Jakarta	Indonesia	Indonesia Convention Exhibition	36,000
March 6, 2023	Jakarta	Indonesia	Indonesia Convention Exhibition	36,000
March 10, 2023	Bangkok	Thailand	Impact Arena	35,000
March 11, 2023	Bangkok	Thailand	Impact Arena	35,000
March 12, 2023	Bangkok	Thailand	Impact Arena	35,000
March 24, 2023	Hong Kong		AsiaWorld–Arena	22,000
March 25, 2023	Hong Kong		AsiaWorld–Arena	22,000
March 28, 2023	London	England	OVO Arena	—
March 30, 2023	Paris	France	Zénith Paris	—
April 3, 2023	Berlin	Germany	Mercedes-Benz Arena	—
April 5, 2023	Newark	United States	Prudential Center	10,000
April 7, 2023	Rosemont	United States	Allstate Arena	—
April 9, 2023	Atlanta	United States	State Farm Arena	—
April 12, 2023	Houston	United States	Toyota Center	—
April 14, 2023	Grand Prairie	United States	Texas Trust CU Theatre	—
April 18, 2023	Anaheim	United States	Honda Center	—
April 21, 2023	Seattle	United States	Climate Pledge Arena	—
April 29, 2023	Manila	Philippines	SM Mall of Asia Arena	—
April 30, 2023	Manila	Philippines	SM Mall of Asia Arena	—
May 1, 2023	Singapore		Singapore Indoor Stadium	—
May 13, 2023	Macau		Cotai Arena	—
May 14, 2023	Macau		Cotai Arena	—
May 20, 2023	Kuala Lumpur	Malaysia	Axiata Arena	—
June 1, 2023	Seoul	South Korea	Gocheok Sky Dome; Beyond Live (Note: June 3 only.)	—
June 2, 2023	Seoul	South Korea	Gocheok Sky Dome; Beyond Live	—
June 3, 2023	Seoul	South Korea	Gocheok Sky Dome; Beyond Live	—
July 4, 2023	São Paulo	Brazil	Vibra São Paulo	—
July 6, 2023	Santiago	Chile	Movistar Arena	—
July 8, 2023	Lima	Peru	Arena 1	—
July 11, 2023	Mexico City	Mexico	Mexico City Arena	—
Total				N/A
