= Walk (album) =

- Digital cover

Studio album by NCT 127
- Released: July 15, 2024
- Studios: SM Dorii Studio; SM Aube Studio; SM Yellow Tail Studio
- Genre: Hip-hop
- Length: 33:21
- Languages: Korean; English
- Labels: SM; Kakao

NCT 127 chronology
Be There For Me (2023)	Walk (2024)	Blingy (2026)

NCT chronology
Songbird (2024)	Walk (2024)	The Highest (2024)

Singles from Walk
- 1. "Walk" Released: July 15, 2024

Walk is the sixth Korean studio album (seventh overall) by NCT 127, sub-unit of South Korean boy band NCT. It was released on July 15, 2024, through SM Entertainment and Kakao Entertainment, and consists of eleven tracks including the lead single of the same name.

It was the final NCT album to feature Taeil, who was removed from the group one month later, and the final 127 album to feature Mark.

== Background and release ==
On June 13, 2024, SM Entertainment announced to Korean media that NCT 127 were preparing to release their sixth studio album in July. On June 24, NCT 127 officially announced the title and release date of their album Walk and its lead single of the same name. On June 25, a trailer video titled "Walking Club 127" was released, followed by teaser photos showcasing the concept of the album. On June 27, the group released a video series called On The Beat: Podcast where the members discussed the album. On July 1, the titles of all 11 tracks from the album were revealed, along with a three-episode miniseries titled The Time Walk posted on social media. On July 8 and 11, NCT 127 released music videos for tracks "Intro: Wall to Wall" and "Meaning of Love". The album was released on July 15, 2024.

== Promotion ==
On July 15, NCT 127 held the "Walk Daily Magazine Launch Party", a live event to commemorate and discuss album's release. The group also opened a Walk-themed pop-up store event in Seoul, running from July 16 to 28, 2024. Additionally, special content for the album was featured on the music platform Melon as part of their Melon Spotlight service the day after the album's release.

== Track listing ==
Walk track listing
No.	Title	Lyrics	Music	Arrangement	Length
1.	"Intro: Wall to Wall"	Wutan	Christopher Aaron Johnson; Mark Benedicto	New-Haven	2:31
2.	"Walk" (Korean: 삐그덕; RR: Ppigeudeok)	Wutan	Landon Sears; Manifest; L8kshor; Jonathan Hoskins; MZMC	Jonathan Hoskins; L8kshor; MZMC	3:11
3.	"No Clue"	Lee Hye-yum (Jam Factory)	Mike Daley; Mitchell Owens; Sara Forsberg; Wilbart "Vedo" McCoy III; Adrian McKinnon; Jeremy "Tay" Jasper; Michael "TruPopGod" Jiminez	Mike Daley; Mitchell Owens	3:13
4.	"Orange Seoul" (오렌지색 물감; Orenjisaek mulgam)	Wutan	Humbler; Andrew Choi; San Yoon	Humbler	3:26
5.	"Pricey"	Yoo Jae-eun (Jam Factory)	Patrick "J. Que" Smith; Dewain Whitmore Jr.; Grant Boutin	Grant Boutin	2:58
6.	"Time Capsule"	Cho In-ho (Lalala Studio)	Alex Wilke; Jake Miller; Jack Samson	Alex Wilke	2:56
7.	"Can't Help Myself" (영화처럼; Yeonghwacheoreom)	Kenzie	Kenzie; Peter Wallevik; Daniel Davidsen; Ben Samama; David Arkwright	PhD	3:05
8.	"Rain Drop"	Jung Il-li (Jam Factory)	Ninos Hanna; CX Lucas; Adam Ben Yahia; Justin Starling	CX Lucas	2:55
9.	"Gas"	Wutan	Anthony Russo; Kami; Kyle Buckley; Charles Roberts Nelsen; MZMC	Inverness; Pink Slip; MZMC	3:22
10.	"Suddenly" (서서히; Seoseohi)	Moon Yu-wol (153/Joombas); Zaya (153/Joombas)	TruGent; Ronnie Icon; Ryan Curtis	TruGent; Ronnie Icon	2:57
11.	"Meaning of Love" (사랑한다는 말의 뜻을 알아가자; Saranghandaneun marui tteuseul aragaja)	Demian	No2zcat; Sutt; Demian; Kim Ji-seop; U1	No2zcat; Sutt; Kim Ji-seop	2:47
Total length:					33:21

== Charts ==
=== Weekly charts ===
Weekly chart performance for Walk
Chart (2024–2025)	Peak position
Belgian Albums (Ultratop Flanders)	149
French Albums (SNEP)	178
Greek Albums (IFPI)	49
Hungarian Physical Albums (MAHASZ)	16
Japanese Albums (Oricon)	7
Japanese Combined Albums (Oricon)	7
Japanese Hot Albums (Billboard Japan)	6
Portuguese Albums (AFP)	34
Scottish Albums (Official Charts)	32
South Korean Albums (Circle)	1
UK Albums Sales (OCC)	40
UK Physical Albums (OCC)	38
US Billboard 200	117
US Independent Albums (Billboard)	18
US World Albums (Billboard)	4

=== Monthly charts ===
Monthly chart performance for Walk
Chart (2024)	Position
Japanese Albums (Oricon)	18
South Korean Albums (Circle)	3

=== Year-end charts ===
Year-end chart performance for Walk
Chart (2024)	Position
South Korean Albums (Circle)	26

== Certifications ==
Certifications for Walk
Region	Certification	Certified units/sales
South Korea (KMCA)	3× Platinum	750,000^{^}
^{^} Shipments figures based on certification alone.

== Release history ==
Release history for Walk
Region	Date	Format	Label
Various	July 15, 2024	Digital download; streaming	SM; Kakao
South Korea	July 15, 2024	CD	SM; Kakao
Japan	July 15, 2024	CD	Avex
