= The Dream Show 3: Dream( )scape =

2024 concert tour by NCT Dream

- World tour by NCT Dream
- Associated album: ISTJ; Dream()scape; Dreamscape
- Start date: May 2, 2024
- End date: December 1, 2024
- Legs: 4
- No. of shows: 37

NCT Dream concert chronology
- The Dream Show 2: In A Dream (2022–2023); The Dream Show 3: Dream( )scape (2024); The Dream Show 4: Dream the Future (2025-2026)

The Dream Show 3: Dream( )scape (stylized as NCT DREAM TOUR 'THE DREAM SHOW3 : DREAM( )SCAPE') was the second worldwide concert tour headlined by NCT Dream, the third sub-unit of a South Korean boy group NCT, in support of their 2024 EP Dream()scape. The tour began in May 2024 and concluded in December 2024.

== Background ==
NCT Dream announced their third world tour in February 2024. The tour kicked off in May 2024 in Seoul with a 3-day concert in Gocheok Sky Dome starting on May 2. On May 8, 2024, NCT Dream announced new additional dates with new additional legs for their tour in Latin America, United States and Europe.

== Setlist ==
Seoul
1. "icantfeelanything" (VCR)
2. "BOX"
3. "119"
4. "SOS"
5. "GO"
6. "Poison"
7. "Drippin'"
8. "Arcade"
9. "We Go Up"
10. "Bungee"
11. "Walk With You"
12. "Never Goodbye"
13. "Breathing"
14. "UNKNOWN"
15. "Tangerine Love (Favorite)"
16. "Yogurt Shake"
17. "Pretzel"
18. "Candy"
19. "Dream Run"
20. "Better Than Gold"
21. "Fireflies"
22. "Hello Future"
23. "Broken Melodies"
24. "Skateboard"
25. "ISTJ"
26. "Smoothie"

Encore

27. "Blue Wave"
28. "Dive Into You"
29. "ANL"
30. "Like We Just Met"
Japan
1. "icantfeelanything" (VCR)
2. "BOX"
3. "119"
4. "SOS"
5. "GO"
6. "Poison"
7. "Drippin'"
8. "Arcade"
9. "We Go Up"
10. "Bungee"
11. "Walk With You"
12. "Never Goodbye"
13. "Breathing"
14. "UNKNOWN"
15. "Tangerine Love (Favorite)"
16. "Yogurt Shake"
17. "Pretzel"
18. "Candy"
19. "Dream Run"
20. "Better Than Gold"
21. "Fireflies"
22. "Hello Future"
23. "Broken Melodies"
24. "Skateboard"
25. "ISTJ"
26. "Smoothie"

Encore

27. "Blue Wave"
28. "Dive Into You"
29. "ANL"
30. "Moonlight"
31. "Like We Just Met"
Latin & North America
1. "icantfeelanything" (VCR)
2. "BOX"
3. "SOS"
4. "GO"
5. "Poison"
6. "Drippin'"
7. "Arcade"
8. "We Go Up"
9. "Bungee"
10. "Walk With You"
11. "Never Goodbye"
12. "Breathing"
13. "Yogurt Shake"
14. "Pretzel"
15. "Candy"
16. "Dream Run"
17. "Better Than Gold"
18. "Fireflies"
19. "Hello Future"
20. "Broken Melodies"
21. "Skateboard"
22. "ISTJ"
23. "Smoothie"

Encore

24. "Rains in Heaven"
25. "ANL"
26. "Like We Just Met"
Europe
1. "icantfeelanything" (VCR)
2. "BOX"
3. "SOS"
4. "GO"
5. "Poison"
6. "Drippin'"
7. "Arcade"
8. "We Go Up"
9. "Bungee"
10. "Walk With You"
11. "Never Goodbye"
12. "Breathing"
13. "Yogurt Shake"
14. "Pretzel"
15. "Candy"
16. "Dream Run"
17. "Better Than Gold"
18. "Fireflies"
19. "Hello Future"
20. "Broken Melodies"
21. "Skateboard"
22. "ISTJ"
23. "Smoothie"

Encore

24. "Rains in Heaven"
25. "ANL"
26. "Like We Just Met"
Seoul Finale
1. "icantfeelanything" (VCR)
2. "BOX"
3. "No Escape"
4. "SOS"
5. "Poison"
6. "119"
7. "Beatbox"
8. "We Go Up"
9. "Bungee"
10. "Walk With You"
11. "Never Goodbye"
12. "Breathing"
13. "Rains in Heaven"
14. "Chewing Gum"
15. "Yogurt Shake"
16. "Candy"
17. "When I'm With You"
18. "Dream Run"
19. "Fireflies"
20. "Trigger The Fever"
21. "Hello Future"
22. "Broken Melodies"
23. "Skateboard"
24. "ISTJ"
25. "Smoothie"

Encore

26. "Dive Into You"
27. "Heavenly"
28. "ANL"
29. "Like We Just Met"

== Shows ==
List of concerts showing date, city, country, venue, and attendance
Date	City	Country	Venue	Attendance
May 2, 2024	Seoul	South Korea	Gocheok Sky Dome	—
May 3, 2024	Seoul	South Korea	Gocheok Sky Dome	—
May 4, 2024	Seoul	South Korea	Gocheok Sky Dome	—
May 18, 2024	Jakarta	Indonesia	Gelora Bung Karno Stadium	40,000
May 11, 2024	Osaka	Japan	Kyocera Dome Osaka	235,000
May 12, 2024	Osaka	Japan	Kyocera Dome Osaka	235,000
May 25, 2024	Tokyo	Japan	Tokyo Dome	235,000
May 26, 2024	Tokyo	Japan	Tokyo Dome	235,000
June 2, 2024	Nagoya	Japan	Vantelin Dome Nagoya	235,000
June 15, 2024	Hong Kong		AsiaWorld–Arena	—
June 16, 2024	Hong Kong		AsiaWorld–Arena	—
June 22, 2024	Bangkok	Thailand	Rajamangala National Stadium	65,000
June 23, 2024	Bangkok	Thailand	Rajamangala National Stadium	65,000
June 29, 2024	Singapore		Singapore Indoor Stadium	—
June 30, 2024	Singapore		Singapore Indoor Stadium	—
August 10, 2024	Pasay (Note: Labelled as Manila in promotional material.)	Philippines	SM Mall of Asia Arena	—
August 11, 2024	Pasay	Philippines	SM Mall of Asia Arena	—
August 31, 2024	Bogotá	Colombia	Movistar Arena	—
September 2, 2024	São Paulo	Brazil	Espaço Unimed	—
September 5, 2024	Santiago	Chile	Movistar Arena	—
September 9, 2024	Mexico City	Mexico	Palacio de los Deportes	—
September 12, 2024	Los Angeles	United States	Intuit Dome	—
September 14, 2024	Oakland	United States	Oakland Arena	—
September 17, 2024	Fort Worth	United States	Dickies Arena	—
September 19, 2024	Duluth	United States	Gas South Arena	—
September 21, 2024	Elmont	United States	UBS Arena	—
September 24, 2024	Washington D.C.	United States	Capital One Arena	—
September 26, 2024	Chicago	United States	United Center	—
October 30, 2024	Rotterdam	Netherlands	Rotterdam Ahoy	—
November 3, 2024	Copenhagen	Denmark	Royal Arena	—
November 6, 2024	Berlin	Germany	Uber Arena	—
November 8, 2024	Paris	France	Adidas Arena	—
November 9, 2024	Paris	France	Adidas Arena	—
November 12, 2024	London	England	OVO Arena Wembley	—
November 29, 2024	Seoul	South Korea	Gocheok Sky Dome	—
November 30, 2024	Seoul	South Korea	Gocheok Sky Dome	—
December 1, 2024	Seoul	South Korea	Gocheok Sky Dome	—
