= The Highest =

- Digital cover

EP by WayV
- Released: August 8, 2024
- Genre: J-pop
- Length: 19:37
- Language: Japanese
- Labels: Avex Trax; SM

WayV chronology
Give Me That (2024)	The Highest (2024)	Frequency (2024)

NCT chronology
Walk (2024)	The Highest (2024)	Steady (2024)

Singles from The Highest
- 1. "Go Higher" Released: September 25, 2024

Music videos
- "Go Higher" on YouTube

The Highest is the first Japanese EP by the Chinese boy band WayV. It was released on digitally August 8, 2024 and physically on September 25, 2024 through their Japanese record label Avex Trax. The EP comprises six songs, including the lead single, "Go Higher". It is the group's second consecutive release without the participation member Winwin, who was on hiatus from the group due to schedule conflicts with his solo activities. The album was a commercial success, debuting at number-one on the Oricon Albums Chart.

== Background and release ==
In early May 2024, SM Entertainment confirmed that WayV planned to release their first Japanese EP in the third quarter of the year. On July 2, the EP was officially announced, with SM Entertainment and Avex Trax announcing that The Highest would be released on September 25, 2024. The EP was later released digitally on August 8, with the physical release in Japan occurring on September 25. A music video for lead single "Go Higher" was released concurrently with the physical version of the album.

== Promotion ==
To promote the EP, the group embarked on their first full concert tour On the Way, which began in Nagoya on August 17, with further stops in Kobe and Tokyo before continuing internationally.

== Commercial performance ==
Within Japan, The Highest debuted at number one on both the Oricon Albums Chart and the Oricon Combined Albums Chart for the week ending September 29, selling 62,748 copies in its first week. On the Billboard Japan Hot Albums chart, the EP debuted at number two.

As of October 2024, the EP has sold 70,065 copies.

== Track listing ==
The Highest track listing
No.	Title	Lyrics	Music	Arrangement	Length
1.	"Go Higher"	Mahiro	Kenzie; Keynon Moore; Jonatan Gusmark; Ludvig Evers	Moonshine	3:17
2.	"Tempo"	MEG.ME	Jakob Mihoubi; Rudi Daouk; CX Lucas	CX Lucas	3:09
3.	"Deep Ocean"	Ayana Hibi	Black Doe; Hyun	Black Doe; Hyun	3:01
4.	"What a Good Time"	Yui Kimura	Andreas Öberg; Ninos Hanna; Ludwig Lindell	Lindell	3:12
5.	"Images"	Akta	Timothy "Bos" Bullock; Leven Kali; Sol Was; Jeremy "Tay" Jasper; Adrian McKinnon	Bullock; Kali; Was; Jasper; McKinnon	3:35
6.	"Bandage"	Yui Kimura	Chamane; INFX	Chamane; INFX	3:23
Total length:					19:37

== Charts ==
=== Weekly charts ===
Weekly chart performance for The Highest
Chart (2024)	Peak position
Japanese Albums (Oricon)	1
Japanese Combined Albums (Oricon)	1
Japanese Hot Albums (Billboard Japan)	2

=== Monthly charts ===
Monthly chart performance for The Highest
Chart (2024)	Position
Japanese Albums (Oricon)	10

=== Year-end charts ===
Year-end chart performance for The Highest
Chart (2024)	Position
Japanese Albums (Oricon)	69

== Release history ==
Release history for The Highest
Region	Date	Format	Label
Various	August 8, 2024	Digital download; streaming	Avex
Japan	September 25, 2024	CD	Avex

== See also ==
- List of Oricon number-one albums of 2024
