= Hunan International Convention & Exhibition Center =

- 湖南国际会展中心
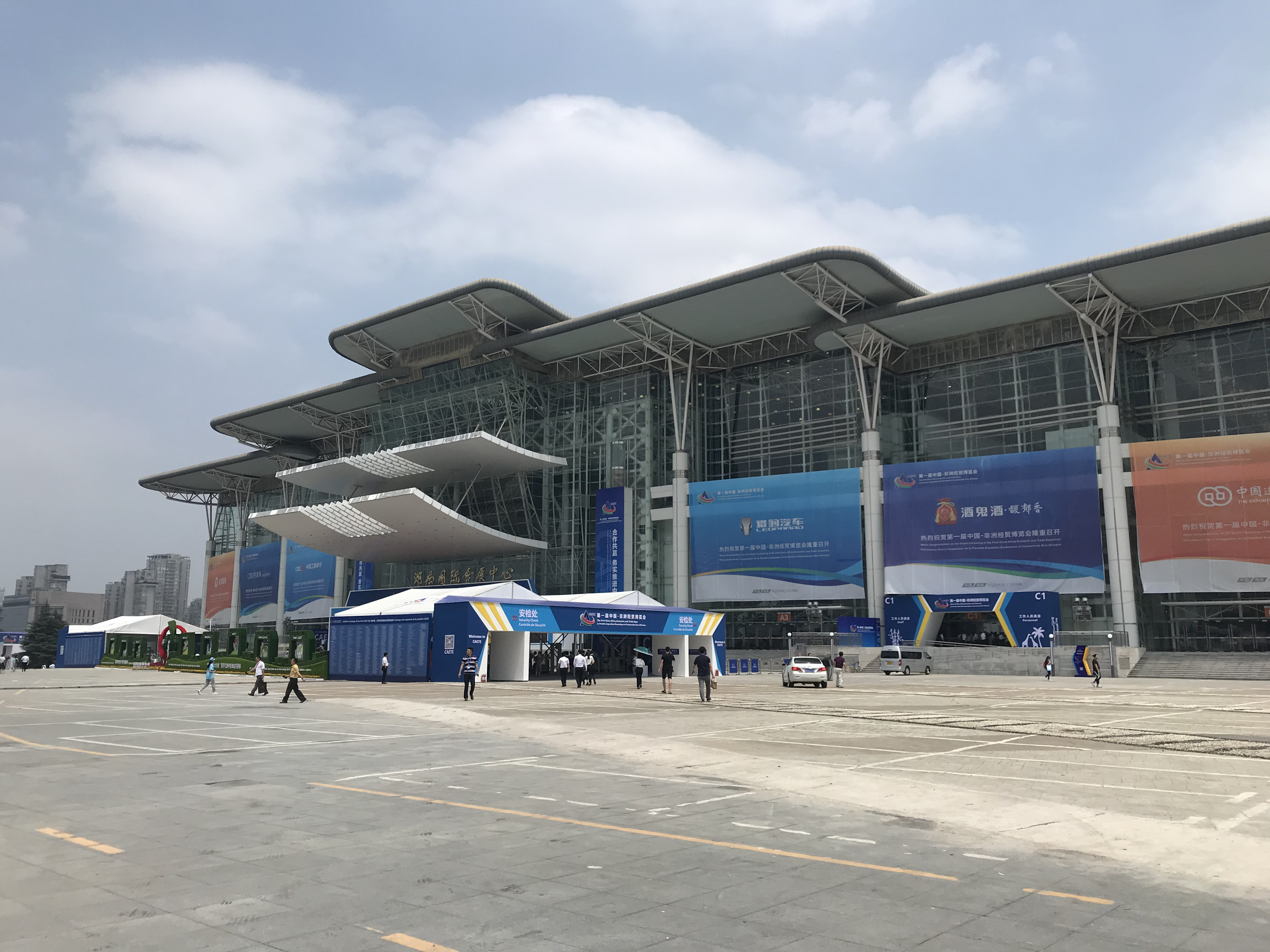
- Hunan International Convention & Exhibition Center in 2019

- Location within Hunan

General information
- Type: Modern architecture
- Location: Kaifu District of Changsha, Hunan, China
- Coordinates: 28°14′16″N 113°02′37″E
- Groundbreaking: 2002
- Completed: November 2002
- Cost: 690 million yuan
- Affiliation: Hunan Broadcasting and Television Group

Height
- Architectural: Chinese architecture

Technical details
- Material: Glass, steel, concrete
- Floor area: 100,000 m^{2} (1,100,000 sq ft)
- Grounds: 250,000 m^{2} (2,700,000 sq ft)

Website
- www.hnicec.com

Chinese name
- Simplified Chinese: 湖南国际会展中心
- Traditional Chinese: 湖南國際會展中心
Transcriptions
Standard Mandarin
- Hanyu Pinyin: Húnán Guójì Huìzhǎn Zhōngxīn

Hunan International Convention & Exhibition Center (HICEC) is a large-scale exhibition venue located in Kaifu District of Changsha, Hunan, China.

== History ==
Hunan International Convention & Exhibition Center began trial operations in November 2002. The total construction investment was 690 million yuan.

== Facilities ==
The total building area of Hunan International Convention & Exhibition Center is approximately 100,000 m^{2} (1,100,000 sq ft), with an exhibition hall area of 50,000 m^{2} (540,000 sq ft). It can accommodate nearly 2,000 international standard booth spaces and includes a multi-functional hall capable of holding over 20,000 people, making it one of the largest indoor public activity spaces in China. The international conference area boasts 25 meeting rooms of various specifications, equipped with first-rate facilities including simultaneous interpretation and multimedia broadcast systems. The venue hosts a diverse range of events, including major exhibitions like the Hunan Auto Show, international conferences, cultural performances, and sports competitions.

== Surrounding buildings ==
Hunan International Convention & Exhibition Center is situated within the Golden Eagle Film & Television Cultural City. Its location offers excellent supporting amenities, with nearby landmarks including the Hunan Radio and Television Center, Window of the World, and the Undersea World Changsha aquarium.

== Transportation ==
The closest stations of Changsha Metro near Hunan International Convention & Exhibition Center are Yuehu Park station on Line 3 and Malanshan station on Line 5.
