= Give Me That (EP) =

- Digital and Collection version cover

EP by WayV
- Released: June 3, 2024
- Length: 18:14
- Languages: Mandarin; Korean; English
- Label: SM

WayV chronology
On My Youth (2023)	Give Me That (2024)	The Highest (2024)

NCT chronology
Dream()scape (2024)	Give Me That (2024)	Walk (2024)

Singles from Give Me That
- 1. "Give Me That" Released: June 3, 2024

Give Me That is the fifth EP by the Chinese boy band WayV, released on June 3, 2024, through SM Entertainment. It includes six songs, including the lead single, "Give Me That", in both Mandarin and Korean versions. The EP debuted at number one on the Circle Album Chart. It is the group's first release without member Winwin.

== Commercial performance ==
The EP debuted at number one on the South Korean Circle Album Chart with over 300,000 copies sold of its two physical versions. It also debuted at number 22 on the Japanese Oricon Albums Chart with 2,015 copies sold in its first week of availability.

== Track listing ==
Give Me That track listing
No.	Title	Lyrics	Music	Arrangement	Length
1.	"Give Me That"	Pan Yanting (YTP)	Kenzie; Courtlin Jabrae Edwards; Pontus "Oneye" Kalm; Tommy Brown; Ludwig Lindell	Kalm; Brown; Lindell	2:56
2.	"She a Wolf"	Park Tae-won	Ronny Svendsen; Adrian Thesen; Anne Judith Wik; Jop Pangemanan; Kyle Wong	Svendsen; Pizzapunk	3:15
3.	"Might as Well" (预言)	Pan	Brian U; MarkAlong; Honey Noise (The Hub); Noerio; Jacob Aaron (The Hub); Jan Baars; Rajan Muse; Nathan Lewis	Brian U; MarkAlong; Honey Noise	3:06
4.	"New Ride" (浪漫公路)	Pan	Greg Bonnick; Hayden Chapman; Lenno Linjama; Jeffrey the Kiddd; Adrian Mckinnon	LDN Noise; Lenno	2:56
5.	"Don't Get Mad"	Pan	Daniel Davidsen; Peter Wallevik; Ed Drewett; Fraser Churchill; Mich Hansen	PhD	3:05
6.	"Give Me That" (Korean version)	Kenzie	Kenzie; Edwards; Kalm; Brown; Lindell	Kalm; Brown; Lindell	2:56
Total length:					18:14

== Charts ==
=== Weekly charts ===
Weekly chart performance for Give Me That
Chart (2024)	Peak position
Japanese Albums (Oricon)	5
Japanese Combined Albums (Oricon)	6
Japanese Hot Albums (Billboard Japan)	3
South Korean Albums (Circle)	1

=== Monthly charts ===
Monthly chart performance for Give Me That
Chart (2024)	Position
Japanese Albums (Oricon)	27
South Korean Albums (Circle)	6

=== Year-end charts ===
Year-end chart performance for Give Me That
Chart (2024)	Position
South Korean Albums (Circle)	65

== Certifications ==
Certifications for Give Me That
Region	Certification	Certified units/sales
South Korea (KMCA)	Platinum	250,000^{^}
^{^} Shipments figures based on certification alone.
