= 2026 in South Korean music =

The following is a list of notable events and releases that have happened, or are expected to happen in 2026 in music in South Korea.

== Award ceremonies ==
2026 music award ceremonies in South Korea
Date	Event	Host	Ref.
January 10	40th Golden Disc Awards	Ilgan Sports and JTBC Plus	
February 15	33rd Hanteo Music Awards	Hanteo Global	
May 16–17	Asia Star Entertainer Awards 2026	Newsen and @Style	

== Debuting and disbanding in 2026 ==
=== Debuting groups ===
- A2O Lite
- A2O Soul
- AEN
- AFuture
- Ambio
- Alpha Drive One
- And2ble
- Arise
- B:Dawn
- ChaDongHyeop
- Chaser
- Chrocktikal
- Daily:Direction
- DK X Seungkwan
- Dodree
- Exo-KaSe
- Flare U
- Girls' Generation-HRS
- Hiipe Princess
- Heart of Woman
- Hrtz.wav
- Keyveatz
- Jeonghan X Joshua
- Keyvitup
- Latency
- Lngshot
- Modyssey
- Navillera
- Naze
- NCT JNJM
- Ourbirthday
- OWIS
- QQQ
- Suction
- Super Junior-83z
- Tessar
- Tuide
- Tunexx
- Unchild
- V01d
- V8
- Vay Onn
- Yuhz

=== Solo debuts ===
- Chaeryeong
- Evan
- Jang Han-eum
- Jiwoo
- June
- Kangmin
- Minseo
- Shin Won-ho
- Sung Han-bin
- Universe
- Yeojin
- Yorch
- Yuna

=== Disbandments ===
- ARrC
- BXB
- CIX
- DKZ
- NOMAD
- Tempest
- UNIS

=== Reunions and re-establishments ===
- Cross Gene
- I.O.I
- Secret

== Releases in 2026 ==
=== First quarter ===
==== January ====
Date	Album	Artist(s)	Ref.
5	Re: Love	Apink	
5	Yesweare	Idntt	
5	光 (Insanity)	Joohoney	
7	3logy	CNBLUE	
7	Gray.	Shin Soo-hyun	
7	XO, My Cyberlove	Chuu	
8	In Elixir: Spellbound	Waker	
12	Euphoria	Alpha Drive One	
12	Serenade	DK X Seungkwan	
13	Funky Like Me	N.SSign	
13	Shot Callers	Lngshot	
14	Crossfade:	Inseong	
15	We Break, You Awake	Chrocktikal	
16	The Sin: Vanish	Enhypen	
18	Low Kik	Kik	
19	Evolve	Catch The Young	
19	Prussian Blue	Can't Be Blue	
19	Reverxe	Exo	
20	Alive	La Poem	
20	原	Oneus	
21	Amplify My Way	AxMxP	
23	Big Impact	Choi Soo-ho	
26	Delulu Pack	KiiiKiii	
28	Come True	Pow	
29	Never Meant to Be	Heize X Giriboy	
29	Rock the Nation	Whib	
30	Studio We: Recording #4	Onewe	

==== February ====
Date	Album	Artist(s)	Ref.
2	Re-Flow	Zerobaseone	
4	BoyNextDoor Tour 'Knock On Vol.1' Final (Live)	BoyNextDoor	
5	Collection of Props Vol.2	Jeong Dong-won	
6	Golden Hour: Part.4	Ateez	
9	Girl Meets Boy	Madein	
9	Unloved Echo	Yang Yo-seob	
11	(Ex)ist	Jiwoo	
12	Woody.zip	Woody	
18	Call It Love	IHwak	
20	Hyper	X:IN	
23	Both Sides	NCT JNJM	
23	First:Delivery	Daily:Direction	
23	Master Voice	Park Ji-hyeon	
23	Press Winter	Padi	
23	Revive+	Ive	
24	Choco La Familia	Choco	
25	Route 01: Burning Point	Chaser	
26	Animated	Lavin	
26	Between Cobalt and Navy	Big Naughty	
26	1'Only	One Pact	
26	QtoresQ	QQQ	
26	Still: I	Asc2nt	
27	Deadline	Blackpink	

==== March ====
Date	Album	Artist(s)	Ref.
2	Off the Map	Kim Sung-kyu	
2	X: 3 / ?	Nell	
3	Code	Everglow	
3	Set By Us Only	Tunexx	
3	The Greatest Battle	Big Ocean	
4	Archive. 1	Woodz	
4	One	Shin Won-ho	
5	Lovechapter	H1-Key	
6	Ruby (The Complete Collection)	Jennie	
7	Set It Off	Five O One	
7	Skinz Is Skinz	Skinz	
9	Pop It Like	Nouera	
9	Sub Character	Younha	
9	Tough Love	Onew	
10	Lv1	Yeojin	
10	Run Run Run	Dragon Pony	
11	01	V01d	
11	Love Catcher	Choi Ye-na	
11	Who Do You Love?: I Need You	In A Minute	
12	Babyface	Odd Youth	
12	Unique	P1Harmony	
14	My Blue	June	
16	No Doubt	All(H)Ours	
16	Seven: Crimson Horizon	AB6IX	
18	Boys Be Ambitious	Ambio	
18	Late O' Clock	Latency	
20	Arirang	BTS	
23	Ice Cream	Yuna	
23	Museum	OWIS	
23	Free Falling	Kangmin	
24	After Cry	Baby Dont Cry	
25	About Love	SF9	
25	Rev	Moonbyul	
26	Point Blank	Dignity	
30	Biggest Fan	Irene	
30	Daydream	Jang Han-eum	
30	Training Day	Lngshot	
30	Unpiltered	Wonpil	
31	Crack Code	Kep1er	
31	Love in the Margins	Jeong Se-woon	

=== Second quarter ===
==== April ====
Date	Album	Artist(s)	Ref.
1	Lost and Found	Kino	
2	Unveil	Somin	
3	Another Dimension	T.O.P	
3	A & E	Park Hyo-shin	
6	My First Kick	KickFlip	
6	Who Is She	Kiss of Life	
7	Flowering	AKMU	
8	Definition	Ampers&One	
8	Keyvitup	Keyvitup	
8	The First Wave	Hrtz.wav	
13	1.Got Hooked: An Addictive Symphony	Modyssey	
13	7th Year: A Moment of Stillness in the Thorns	Tomorrow X Together	
13	Caligo Pt.2	Plave	
15	As If	Ifeye	
15	Be: 2	Be Boys	
16	Adagio	Wheein	
16	Re Ep.1	Arise	
17	Dead And	Xdinary Heroes	
17	Nail	Yves	
20	Alive	Donghae	
20	Backtalk	Evnne	
20	Ode to Love	NCT Wish	
20	The Legacy	Forestella	
21	Set	B1A4	
21	We Are Unchild	Unchild	
21	We on Fire	&Team	
26	Re:flect	Park Ji-hoon	
27	Ceremony	QWER	
27	Glow	XngHan&Xoul	
27	No Tragedy	TWS	
27	Mmchk	Nexz	
28	Feelm	82Major	
28	Till I Die	Lee Chae-yeon	
29	Childish	Lucy	
29	Off Hours	Soyou	
29	Redefine	Cravity	
30	Mamihlapinatapai	Illit	

==== May ====
Date	Album	Artist(s)	Ref.
4	GreenGreen	Cortis	
4	Choom	Babymonster	
4	Naze	Naze	
6	The Collective Soul and Unconscious: Chapter Two	Billlie	
7	Continuum	Sumi Jo	
7	Orange Record	Yuhz	
11	Heavy Serenade	Nmixx	
12	Doogeundae	ChaDongHyeop	
12	Inyun Part.1	Younite	
13	Said & Done	Park Jin-young	
13	Youth Error	Flare U	
14	First, Again	SeeYa	
18	Ascend-	Zerobaseone	
18	Motto	Itzy	
18	Quintessence	Taeyang	
18	Wyld	Taeyong	
19	Gongbu	Balming Tiger	
19	I.O.I: Loop	I.O.I	
19	Route Zero: The Ora	Xikers	
20	No Reason	Yoon San-ha	
21	Love Me	Shownu X Hyungwon	
21	Purple Note	Hyojung	
22	Pureflow Pt. 1	Le Sserafim	
26	Boyager 6	Boyfriend	
26	Sequence 01: Curiosity	And2ble	
27	17.7	Hiipe Princess	
27	I,God	Xlov	
28	Heart Byte: Legacy	Heart of Woman	
28	Prism Ep.02	Queenz Eye	
28	點: The Quiver	Onewe	
29	Lemonade	Aespa	

==== June ====
Date	Album	Artist(s)	Ref.
1	Assemble26 Love & Pop Pt. 1 Love	TripleS	
1	Atmos	Shinee	
1	Bite Now	Meovv	
1	Imperfect-I'mperfect	Fifty Fifty	
1	New Wav	Treasure	
2	Phantom Fire	Xodiac	
2	Gravity	Kim Junsu	
4	4ward	Mamamoo	
8	Home	BoyNextDoor	
8	Set the Tempo	Izna	
9	Reach You	Yerin	
9	Youth: Epilogue	Epex	
10	Tr.ee	Jay B	
15	II	Riize	
16	2:Love	STAYC	
17	ONF: My Self	ONF	
17	Bite District	Uspeer	
19	Uncapped	Omega X	
20	RePrism	Sandara Park	
22	Lemon Tang	Hearts2Hearts	
23	Re:boot [After the Tears]	Classy	
26	Golden Hour: Part.5	Ateez	
26	Rated R	from20	
26	Album 0	Lee Seung-yoon	
29	V8	V8	
30	Puzzl(ov)e	Jung Dae-hyun	
30	Perfect Target	Choi Yoo-jung	

=== Third quarter ===
==== July ====
Date	Album	Artist(s)	Ref.
1	Playlist #Your Youth	UAU	
6	We Made	I-dle	
7	Borderline	Kihyun	
8	Run to You	AHOF	
8	On My Knees	Trendz	
10	No Labels: Part 02	Yeonjun	
10	99 Degrees	Jaehyun	
13	Promise	Super Junior-83z	
15	Save Me	Kwon Jin-ah	
15	Temperature	Huta	
20	Time's Tickin	U-Know Yunho	
21	8.X	8Turn	
21	Core	Wonho	
21	Glow Me	Fromis 9	
22	OriginaLyn	Hyolyn	
22	Off the Grid	Lun8	
27	Youngest	Young K	
27	.exe	Nouera	
28	Flavor	Pow	
28	Where to Now? (Part.2: Nowhere)	Kard	
29	Second Wind: S#00	The Wind	
29	Ela	Zelo	

==== August ====
Date	Album	Artist(s)	Ref.
1	SKZ-Replay 2026 Pt.1	Stray Kids	
3	Gilboard	Picheolin	
3	Velvet Summer	Red Velvet	
4	Sweat	Kiss of Life	
5	A New Era of Now	AEN	
5	Cherry Pie	Whib	
6	Our Youth	Seo Eun-kwang	
7	Hyper-Ego	Artms	
7	This & That	Stray Kids	
10	Vision Wings	WayV	
10	WhyKiiiKiii	KiiiKiii	
11	Summer, I	Jung Eun-ji	
12	Hello AxMxP	AxMxP	
13	Traces of Summer	Hynn	
19	面: Unknown Atlas	Onewe	
19	Our Birthday	Ourbirthday	
20	Edge of Calm	Tiffany Young	
21	The Sin: Bliss	Enhypen	
24	Blingy	NCT 127	
24	Unbreakable: 少年Beast	Alpha Drive One	
24	Tune & Play	Tuide	
24	Saucin	Nexz	
26	Tenacity	SF9	
28	Fallen Angel	Jennie	
31	Phase 1: Soft Violence	Taemin	

==== September ====
Date	Album	Artist(s)	Ref.
1	Heat	82Major	
2	Blue Mode	Tunexx	
4	The Phase	Monsta X	
4	Still with You	Asc2nt	
7	Death of Me	Evan	
7	Confetti	Verivery	
7	Make It Hot	Minho	
7	What a Wonderful Life	Soyeon	
8	Mark on Me	&Team	
8	Im Hero 10	Lim Young-woong	
8	Dopamine	Doh Kyung-soo	
9	When the Sun Goes Down: Midnight	In a Minute	
10	Unbound	All(H)Ours	
23	First Light: 井	Oneus	
28	Crash	AllDay Project	
30	256th Note	Close Your Eyes	
30	Sonorous	Cravity	

=== Fourth quarter ===
==== October ====
Date	Album	Artist(s)	Ref.
1	Time for Us	TIOT	
6	Kick Off the Wall Pt.1	KickFlip	
6	Where We Are	Yesung	
8	Still	N.Flying	
8	27	Yuqi	
12	I Spy	NCT Wish	
12	Hyperdrive	Plave	
12	Impulse	Xdinary Heroes	
12	Go Hard	Meovv	
12	Dead:Alive	Sung Han-bin	
12	2.Multitude: How We Bloom	Modyssey	
13	Solstice	Park Woo-jin	
14	2X8	Nam Woo-hyun	
14	File.07	Yuju	
15	Lost&Found	Hyojung	
19	Strange Muse	Nmixx	
19	Dreamscape	Jeonghan X Joshua	
19	All of My Life	Max Changmin	
19	On: Our Noise	Evnne	
26	Break Even	Illit	
26	Looks Can Kill	Ive	
26	Hey, Somebody	Xiaojun	
28	I=!	Xlov	

==== November ====
Date	Album	Artist(s)	Ref.
2	To Us	TWS	
5	Ting Ting	Unchild	
9	Lovesick	Chaeryeong	
9	Dream After Dream	NCT Dream	
13	GOLDEN HOUR: Part.6	ATEEZ	
16	Perfect Storm	Tomorrow X Together	
20	Na-sty	Nayeon	
21	4th Deux	Deux	
23	Gleam Hour	Wendy	
30	Unspecial	Taeyeon	

==== December ====
Date	Album	Artist(s)	Ref.
1	Waking Up the Night	Exo-KaSe	

=== TBA ===
Date	Album	Artist(s)	Ref.
TBA	TBA	Yim Jae-beom	

== Top songs on record ==
=== Circle Digital Chart No. 1 Songs ===
- "404 (New Era)" - KiiiKiii (4 weeks)
- "Good Goodbye" - Hwasa (4 weeks)
- "Joy, Sorrow, a Beautiful Heart" - AKMU (2 weeks)
- "Love Attack" - Rescene (7 weeks)
- "My Whole World" - Car, the Garden (2 weeks)
- "Paradise of Rumors" - AKMU (4 weeks)
- "RedRed" - Cortis (5 weeks)
- "Rude!" - Hearts2Hearts (3 weeks)
- "Suddenly" - I.O.I (3 weeks)
- "Swim" - BTS (1 week)

== Sources ==
- Benjamin, Jeff (January 1, 2026). "2026 Release Q1 Calendar Of New K-Pop Albums And Singles". Forbes. New Jersey. ISSN 0015-6914. OCLC 6465733.
- Benjamin, Jeff (April 16, 2026). "2026 Q2 Release Calendar Of New KPop Albums And Singles (Updating)". Forbes. New Jersey. ISSN 0015-6914. OCLC 6465733.
