= Nexz =

Japanese boy band

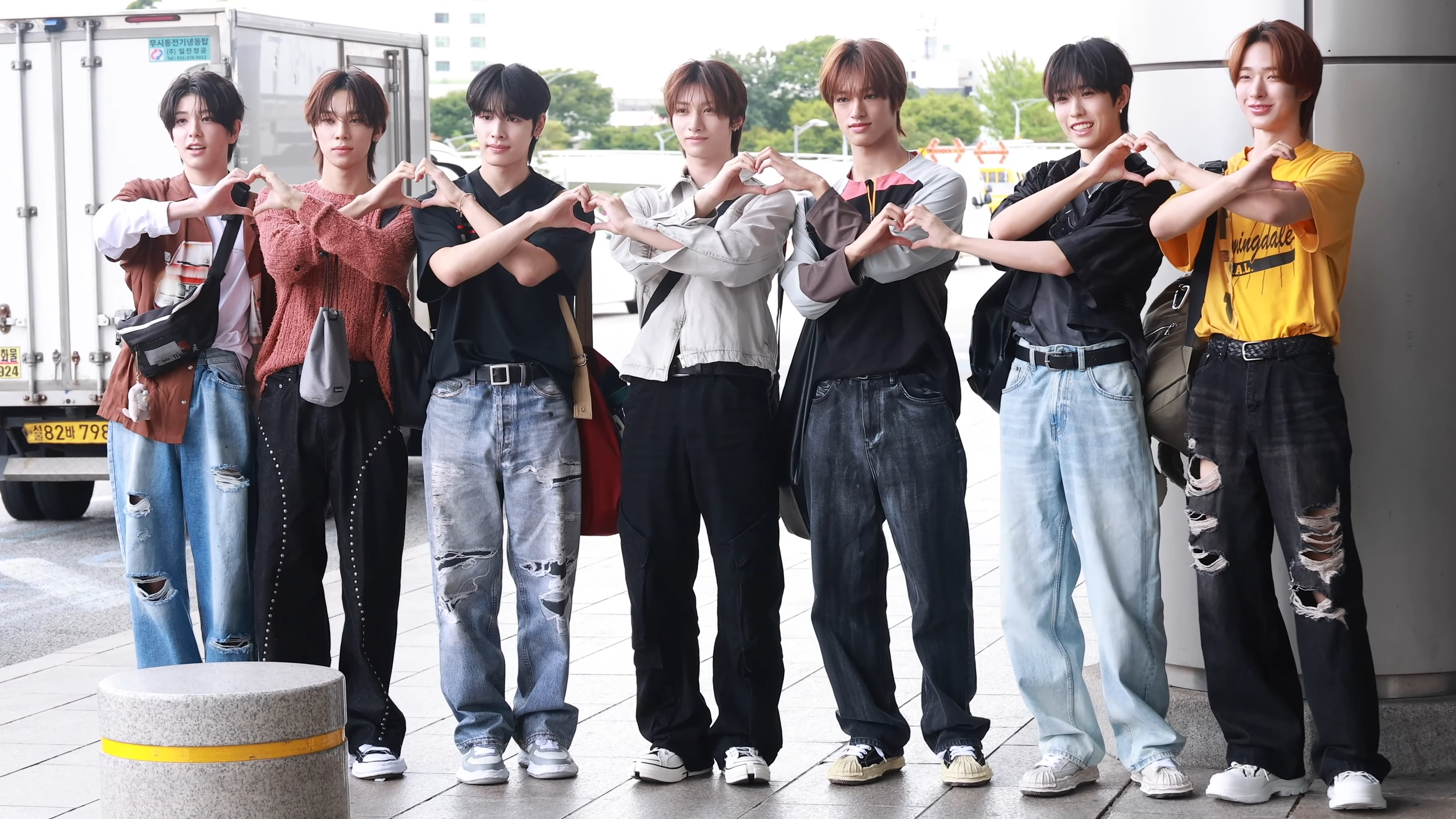
- Nexz in September 2024; L–R: Yuki, So Geon, Haru, Yu, Seita, Hyui, and Tomoya

Background information
- Origin: Seoul, South Korea
- Genres: K-pop; J-pop
- Years active: 2023–present
- Labels: JYP; Sony Music
- Members: Tomoya; Yu; Haru; So Geon; Seita; Hyui; Yuki
- Website: nexz-official.com

Korean name
- Hangul: 넥스지
- Revised Romanization: Nekseuji
- McCune–Reischauer: Neksŭji

Japanese name
- Katakana: ネクスジ
- Revised Hepburn: Nekusuji
- Kunrei-shiki: Nekusuzi

Nexz (Japanese: ネクスジ, Hepburn: Nekusuji; Korean: 넥스지; RR: Nekseuji) is a South Korean and Japanese boy band based in South Korea. The band was formed through the reality-survival program Nizi Project Season 2 and managed by JYP Entertainment and Sony Music Entertainment Japan. The group consists of seven members: Tomoya, Yu, Haru, So Geon, Seita, Hyui, and Yuki. The group debuted on May 20, 2024, with the single album Ride the Vibe along with the lead single of the same name.

== Name ==
The group's name is a combination of the words "next generation" and "generation Z", carrying the message that the group aims to "open up the future of a new generation." The group's fandom name is "Nex2Y" (pronounced /ˈnɛks.ti/).

== History ==
=== Formation and pre-debut single ===
In 2021, JYP Entertainment officially announced the second season of reality survival show Nizi Project with the goal of launching a male idol debut project. The reality show project launched and finalized with 7 members in 2023. Along with the launch of Nexz's official website, JYP announced the release of the group's pre-debut single titled "Miracle" in Japanese and Korean on December 18, 2023. The performance video of "Miracle" exceeded 10 million views only 6 days after its release. "Miracle" was ranked number 10 on the Oricon Daily Digital Single Ranking as of December 18, the day of release, as well as iTunes, It topped several local music sites, including Line Music, AWA, mu-mo, and Rakuten Music.

=== 2024–present: Debut ===
In April 2024, ahead of their official debut, Club Nexz, the group's first solo reality show documenting their debut preparations, began airing on Mnet. Nexz made their official Korean debut on May 20 with the single album Ride the Vibe and its eponymous title track. On the same day, the group held their debut showcase at Yes24 Live Hall in Gwangjin-gu, Seoul and performed the title track and its B-Side, "Starlight". On June 14, 2024, Nexz announced that they will be making their debut in Japan with the release of the extended play Ride Your Vibe (Japanese Ver.) / Keep on Moving on August 21. On October 28, 2024, Nexz announced that they will be having their first comeback with the EP Nallina and its eponymous title track.

On April 6, 2025, it was announced they would release their second EP O-RLY? on April 28, 2025. On June 4, they held their first live tour 'Nexz Live Tour 2025 "One Bite"' at Kanagawa Cults Kawasaki, the tour had 18 shows in 15 cities across Japan and concluded on August 21, with more than 50,000 attendees. Their second Japanese EP, One Bite, was released on July 16. They are held their first Korean concert 'One Beat' for two days on October 25 and 26, at the Olympic Hall. Their third Korean EP, Beat-Boxer, was released on October 27, 2025. They released their second Korean single album Mmchk on April 27. Nexz won their first music program award with "Mmchk" on May 6, on Show Champion.

On May 30, Nexz embarked on their second live tour, titled after their upcoming third Japanese EP, Hellmate, which was later released on June 24, 2026. On August 24, they released their fourth Korean EP, Saucin'. Following promotions for the album, Nexz performed as a supporting act at Stray Kids' music festival, StrayCity, and as openers at Rock in Rio in September. The group announced their first Asian tour; titled Saucin' the World, which will begin with a two-night stint at Olympic Hall in October 2026.

== Endorsements ==
In April 2024, Nexz partnered with Aquarius, and starred in their first television commercial featuring their new original Japanese song, "Keep on Moving", written and produced by J.Y. Park.

== Members ==
- Tomoya (トモヤ; 토모야)
- Yu (ユウ; 유우)
- Haru (ハル; 하루)
- So Geon (ソ ゴン; 소 건)
- Seita (セイタ; 세이타)
- Hyui (ヒュイ; 휴이)
- Yuki (ユウキ; 유키)

== Discography ==
=== Extended plays ===
==== Japanese EPs ====
List of Japanese EPs with selected details, chart positions, sales and certifications
Title	Details	Peak chart positions		Sales	Certifications
Title	Details	JPN	JPN Hot	Sales	Certifications
Ride the Vibe (Japanese Ver.) / Keep on Moving	Released: August 21, 2024; Label: Epic Japan, JYP; Formats: CD, digital download, streaming; Track listing: 1. "Ride the Vibe" (Japanese version); 2. "Keep on Moving"; 3. "Miracle"; 4. "Here & Now"	2		JPN: 82,447	RIAJ: Gold (phy.)
One Bite	Released: July 16, 2025; Label: Epic Japan, JYP; Formats: CD, digital download, streaming; Track listing: 1. "One Bite"; 2. "Burning Black"; 3. "Make it Better"; 4. "One Day"; 5. "O-RLY?" (Japanese Version); 6. "Simmer" (Japanese Version)	2	4	JPN: 80,250	RIAJ: Gold (phy.)
Hellmate	Released: June 24, 2026; Label: Epic Japan, JYP; Formats: CD, digital download, streaming; Track listing: 1. "Hellmate"; 2. "Hands Up, Yo!"; 3. "Can't Hide"; 4. "Mmchk" (Japanese Version); 5. "Hellmate" (Instrumental)	2		JPN: 67,917	RIAJ: Gold (phy.)

==== Korean EPs ====
List of Korean EPs with selected details, chart positions, sales and certifications
Title	Details	Peak chart positions			Sales	Certifications
Title	Details	KOR	JPN	JPN Hot	Sales	Certifications
Nallina	Released: November 18, 2024; Label: JYP; Formats: CD, digital download, streaming	3	6	33	KOR: 172,681; JPN: 22,159	
O-RLY?	Released: April 28, 2025; Label: JYP; Formats: CD, digital download, streaming; Track listing: 1. "O-RLY?"; 2. "Simmer"; 3. "Want More? One More!"; 4. "Run with Me"; 5. "Slo-mo"; 6. "Z Side_250226" (CD only)	1	3	— (Note: O-RLY? did not enter the Billboard Japan Hot Albums, but peaked at number four on the Download Albums.)	KOR: 259,007; JPN: 25,873	
Beat-Boxer	Released: October 27, 2025; Label: JYP; Formats: CD, digital download, streaming; Track listing: 1. "Legacy"; 2. "Beat-Boxer"; 3. "I'm Him"; 4. "Co-Star"; 5. "Next to Me"; 6. "Z Side_250823" (CD only)	2	4	— (Note: Beat-Boxer did not enter the Billboard Japan Hot Albums, but peaked at number three on the Download Albums.)	KOR: 373,542; JPN: 13,918	KMCA: Platinum
Saucin'	Released: August 24, 2026; Label: JYP; Formats: CD, digital download, streaming; Track listing: 1. "Loco"; 2. "Saucin'"; 3. "Appetite"; 4. "Upgrade"; 5. "20 Now"; 6. "Aliens"	3	9	—	KOR: 454,014; JPN: 11,328	
"—" denotes releases that did not chart or were not released in that region.

=== Single albums ===
List of single albums with selected details, chart positions and sales
Title	Details	Peak chart positions	Sales	Certifications
Title	Details	KOR	Sales	Certifications
Ride the Vibe	Released: May 20, 2024; Label: JYP; Formats: CD, digital download, streaming; Track listing: 1. "Ride the Vibe"; 2. "Starlight"	4	KOR: 142,954	
Mmchk	Released: April 27, 2026; Label: JYP; Formats: CD, digital download, streaming; Track listing: 1. "Mmchk"; 2. "Hypeman"; 3. "Mmchk" (English Version)	3	KOR: 450,056	KMCA: Platinum

=== Singles ===
==== Japanese singles ====
List of Japanese singles, with selected chart positions, showing year released and album name
Title	Year	Peak chart positions		Sales	Album
Title	Year	JPN Dig.	JPN Hot	Sales	Album
"Miracle"	2023	11	28	JPN: 3,408 (dig.)	Ride the Vibe (Japanese Ver.) / Keep on Moving
"Ride the Vibe" (Japanese version)	2024	—			Ride the Vibe (Japanese Ver.) / Keep on Moving
"Keep on Moving"	2024	—			Ride the Vibe (Japanese Ver.) / Keep on Moving
"One Bite"	2025	—			One Bite
"Hellmate"	2026	—			Hellmate
"—" denotes releases that did not chart or were not released in that region.

==== Korean singles ====
List of Korean singles, with selected chart positions, showing year released and album name
Title	Year	Peak chart positions			Sales	Album
Title	Year	KOR	JPN Dig.	JPN DL	Sales	Album
"Miracle" (Korean version)	2023	—				Non-album single
"Ride the Vibe"	2024	— (Note: "Ride the Vibe" did not enter the Circle Digital Chart, but peaked at number 87 on the Download Chart.)	48	37	JPN: 1,308 (dig.)	Ride the Vibe
"Keep on Moving" (Korean version)	2024	— (Note: "Keep on Moving" (Korean version) did not enter the Circle Digital Chart, but peaked at number 144 on the Download Chart.)	—	—		Nallina
"Nallina"	2024	— (Note: "Nallina" did not enter the Circle Digital Chart, but peaked at number 102 on the Download Chart.)	—	—		Nallina
"O-RLY?"	2025	165	—	—		O-RLY?
"Beat-Boxer"	2025	120	—	—		Beat-Boxer
"Mmchk"	2026	95	—	25		Mmchk
"Saucin'"	2026	96	—	—		Saucin'
"—" denotes releases that did not chart or were not released in that region.

=== Other charted songs ===
List of other charted songs, with selected chart positions, showing year released and album name
Title	Year	Peak chart positions	Album
Title	Year	KOR DL	Album
"Starlight"	2024	100	Ride the Vibe
"Hard"	2024	131	Nallina
"Next Zeneration"	2024	140	Nallina
"Eye to Eye"	2024	134	Nallina
"Simmer"	2025	118	O-RLY?
"Want More? One More!"	2025	123	O-RLY?
"Run with Me"	2025	115	O-RLY?
"Slo-mo"	2025	122	O-RLY?
"Legacy"	2025	110	Beat-Boxer
"I’m Him"	2025	104	Beat-Boxer
"Co-Star"	2025	111	Beat-Boxer
"Next to Me"	2025	101	Beat-Boxer
"Hypeman"	2026	69	Mmchk
"Mmchk" (English Version)	2026	76	Mmchk
"Loco"	2026	54	Saucin'
"Appetite"	2026	59	Saucin'
"Upgrade"	2026	67	Saucin'
"20 Now"	2026	60	Saucin'
"Aliens"	2026	61	Saucin'

== Filmography ==
=== Reality programs ===
Year	Title	Network	Notes	Ref.
2023	Nizi Project season 2	YouTube, Hulu Japan	Survival show determining Nexz's members	
2024	MiracleZ	Hulu Japan	Documentary introducing the group's members	
2024	Club Nexz	YouTube, Lemino, Mnet	Web series on the group's debut preparation	
2024	Nexz Now	Nippon Television	Nexz's first Japanese variety show	
2025	Nexz to Cafe e	MBS TV	Nexz's second Japanese variety show	

== Videography ==
=== Music videos ===
List of music videos, showing year released and directors
Title	Year	Director(s)	Ref.
"Ride the Vibe"	2024	Nany Kim (Liminal)	
"Starlight"	2024	Novvkim	
"Keep on Moving"	2024	Hong Jaehwan, Lee Hyesu (Swisher)	
"Nallina"	2024	Yvng Wing (IDIOTS)	
"Hard"	2024	Jihoon Shin (Aediastudio)	
"Simmer"	2025	Jihoon Shin (Aediastudio)	
"O-RLY?"	2025	Seong (Digipedi)	
"Slo-mo"	2025	Novvkim	
"One Bite"	2025	Kwon Yong Soo (StudioSaccharin)	
"I'm Him"	2025	Jihoon Shin	
"Beat-Boxer"	2025	Bang Jae-yeob	
"Next to Me"	2025	Nalim Cho	
"Mmchk	2026	Jihoon Shin	
"Hypeman"	2026	Kim Na Yeon (NÄN)	
"Hellmate"	2026	Juli Yl	
"Saucin'"	2026	Jongho JP	
"Upgrade"	2026	TEAMSICKONIC	

=== Other videos ===
List of other videos, showing year released and directors
Title	Year	Director(s)	Ref.
"Miracle" Performance Video	2023	Yong-soo Kwon (StudioSaccharin)	
"Ride the Vibe" Performance Video	2024	Nany Kim (Liminal)	
"Ride the Vibe" Trailer	2024	Yunah Sheep (Liminal)	
"Ride the Vibe" B-Side (edited by Tomoya)	2024	Tomoya	
"Ride the Vibe (Japanese ver.)" Performance Video	2024	Yong-soo Kwon (StudioSaccharin)	
"Keep on Moving" Performance Video	2024	Hong Jaehwan, Lee Hyesu (Swisher)	
"Keep on Moving (Korean ver.)" Performance Video	2024	Yong-soo Kwon (StudioSaccharin)	
"Nallina" Prologue	2024	Yvng Wing (IDIOTS)	
"Nallina" Vertical Short Film 1 (Bored Ver.)	2024	Kim Yejin	
"Nallina" Vertical Short Film 2 (Nalli Ver.)	2024	Kim Yejin	
"Nallina" Performance Video	2024	Yvng Wing (IDIOTS)	
"Next Zeneration" Performance Video	2024	Kim Hyunsu	
"NEXTEP 2025"	2025	TEAMSICKONIC	
"Eye to Eye" B-Side (edited by Tomoya)	2025	Tomoya	
'We Keep Simmering…'	2025	TEAMSICKONIC	
"O-RLY?" Concept Film - RLY Ver.	2025	CHOJOONKOO (AIMUS)	
"O-RLY?" : Break in! (Directed by Tomoya)	2025	Tomoya	
"O-RLY?" Performance Video	2025	Seong (Digipedi)	
"Want More? One More!" Performance Video	2025	Kim Hyunsu	
NEXZ LIVE TOUR 2025 "One Bite" NEXT CHAPTER : Wanna Bite?	2025	TEAMSICKONIC	
"BEAT-BOXER" : INVITATION	2025	TEAMSICKONIC	
"Beat-Boxer" : Where it Started (Directed by Tomoya)	2025	Tomoya, Yvng Wing (IDIOTS)	
"Beat-Boxer" : The Backstage	2025	CHOJOONKOO (AIMUS)	
"Legacy" Performance Video	2025	Hong Jaehwan, Lee Hyesu (Swisher)	
"NEXTEP 2026"	2026	TEAMSICKONIC	
"Mmchk" Trailer	2026	Park Minsoo	
"Mmchk" Highlight Medley	2026	TEAMSICKONIC	
"Mmchk" : 100 Mmchk moments (Directed by Tomoya)	2026	Tomoya	
"Mmchk" Performance Video	2026	Hong Jaehwan (Swisher)	
"SAUCIN'" Trailer 1	2026	TEAMSICKONIC	
"SAUCIN'" Trailer 2	2026	TEAMSICKONIC	
"Loco" Performance Video	2026	Hong Jaehwan (Swisher)	
"SAUCIN'" : Bon appétit (Directed by Tomoya)	2026	Tomoya	
"SAUCIN'" : It’s my new birthday	2026	Hong Jaehwan (Swisher)	

== Live performances ==
=== Showcases ===
Nexz Showcase 2024 "Ride the Vibe"
Date	City	Country	Venue	Attendance	Ref.
August 3, 2024	Fukuoka	Japan	Marine Messe Fukuoka	—	
August 4, 2024	Fukuoka	Japan	Marine Messe Fukuoka	—	
August 17, 2024	Osaka	Japan	Osaka Prefectural Gymnasium	—	
August 18, 2024	Osaka	Japan	Osaka Prefectural Gymnasium	—	
August 24, 2024	Tokyo	Japan	Musashino Forest Sport Plaza	—	
August 25, 2024	Tokyo	Japan	Musashino Forest Sport Plaza	—	

=== Concerts and tours ===
Nexz Live Tour 2025 "One Bite"
Date	City	Country	Venue	Attendance	Ref.
June 4, 2025	Kanagawa	Japan	Culltz Kawasaki (Kawasaki City Sports and Cultural Center)	50,000	
June 7, 2025	Saitama	Japan	Omiya Sonic City Large Hall	50,000	
June 8, 2025	Niigata	Japan	Niigata Terrsa	50,000	
June 13, 2025	Shizuoka	Japan	Act City Hamamatsu Large Hall	50,000	
June 14, 2025	Aichi	Japan	Niterra Japan Special Ceramics Civic Hall Forest Hall	50,000	
June 21, 2025	Okayama	Japan	Kurashiki Civic Hall Large Hall	50,000	
June 28, 2025	Miyagi	Japan	Sendai Sun Plaza Hall	50,000	
July 18, 2025	Tokyo	Japan	Nippon Budokan	50,000	
July 19, 2025	Tokyo	Japan	Nippon Budokan	50,000	
July 22, 2025	Hyogo	Japan	Kobe International Hall	50,000	
July 23, 2025	Hyogo	Japan	Kobe International Hall	50,000	
July 25, 2025	Kyoto	Japan	ROHM Theatre Kyoto Main Hall	50,000	
July 27, 2025	Fukui	Japan	Phoenix Plaza Elpis Large Hall	50,000	
August 13, 2025	Fukuoka	Japan	Fukuoka Sunpalace Concert Hall	50,000	
August 14, 2025	Hiroshima	Japan	Hiroshima Bunka Gakuen HBG Hall	50,000	
August 16, 2025	Tochigi	Japan	Utsunomiya City Cultural Center	50,000	
August 20, 2025	Osaka	Japan	Grand Cube Osaka Main Hall	50,000	
August 21, 2025	Osaka	Japan	Grand Cube Osaka Main Hall	50,000	

Nexz Special Concert "One Beat"
Date	City	Country	Venue	Attendance	Ref.
October 25, 2025	Seoul	South Korea	Olympic Hall	—	
October 26, 2025	Seoul	South Korea	Olympic Hall	—	
January 3, 2026	Taipei	Taiwan	National Taiwan University Sports Center	2,000	
March 28, 2026	Hong Kong	China	AsiaWorld–Expo	—	
March 29, 2026	Hong Kong	China	AsiaWorld–Expo	—	

Nexz Live Tour 2026 "Hellmate"
Date	City	Country	Venue	Attendance	Ref.
May 30, 2026	Tokyo	Japan	Yoyogi National Stadium	20,000	
May 31, 2026	Tokyo	Japan	Yoyogi National Stadium	20,000	
June 12, 2026	Osaka	Japan	Osaka-jo Hall	—	
June 13, 2026	Osaka	Japan	Osaka-jo Hall	—	

Nexz 1st Asia Tour <Saucin' the World>
Date	City	Country	Venue	Attendance	Ref.
October 17, 2026	Seoul	South Korea	Olympic Hall	TBA	
October 18, 2026	Seoul	South Korea	Olympic Hall	TBA	
January 16, 2027	Hyogo	Japan	KOBE WORLD HALL	TBA	
January 17, 2027	Hyogo	Japan	KOBE WORLD HALL	TBA	
January 23, 2027	Aichi	Japan	Port Messe Nagoya Exhibition Hall 1	TBA	
January 24, 2027	Aichi	Japan	Port Messe Nagoya Exhibition Hall 1	TBA	
January 30, 2027	Tokyo	Japan	Keio Arena Tokyo	TBA	
January 31, 2027	Tokyo	Japan	Keio Arena Tokyo	TBA	
February 14, 2027	Hong Kong		Asiaworld-Expo, HALL 5	TBA	
February 20, 2027	Taipei	Taiwan	Zepp New Taipei	TBA	
April 24, 2027	Singapore		The Star Theatre	TBA	
May 29, 2027	Kuala Lumpur	Malaysia	Zepp Kuala Lumpur	TBA	

== Awards and nominations ==
Name of the award ceremony, year presented, category, nominee of the award, and the result of the nomination
Award ceremony	Year	Category	Nominee / Work	Result	Ref.
Asia Artist Awards	2025	Best New Artist	Nexz	Won	
Asia Star Entertainer Awards	2025	The Best New Artist	Nexz	Won	
The Fact Music Awards	2024	Hottest	Nexz	Won	
The Fact Music Awards	2025	Global Hot Trend	Nexz	Won	
Golden Disc Awards	2024	Rookie Artist	Nexz	Nominated	
Golden Disc Awards	2024	Most Popular Artist Award – Male	Nexz	Nominated	
Hanteo Music Awards	2024	Rookie of the Year – Male	Nexz	Nominated	
Hanteo Music Awards	2024	Emerging Artist	Nexz	Nominated	
Hanteo Music Awards	2024	Global Artist Award	Nexz	Nominated	
Korea Grand Music Awards	2025	K-pop Global Artist	Nexz	Won	
Korea Grand Music Awards	2025	Hulu Japanese Popularity	Nexz	Won	
Korea Grand Music Awards	2026	Best Global K-pop Star	Nexz	Won	
Korea Grand Music Awards	2026	Hulu Japanese Popularity	Nexz	Won	
MAMA Awards	2025	Fans' Choice Male Top 10	Nexz	Nominated	
TMELive International Music Awards	2026	Global Top Trend Song Top 10	"Beat-Boxer"	Won	
