= Ride or Die (Evan song) =

2026 song by Evan

Single by Evan

from the EP Death of Me
- B-side: "Overflow"
- Released: June 22, 2026
- Genre: Alternative rock
- Length: 2:15
- Label: Belift Lab
- Songwriters: Evan; Apro; Rob Nelsen; Paak
- Producers: Evan; Inverness

Evan singles chronology
"Dial Tragedy" (2025)	"Ride or Die" (2026)	"Death of Me" (2026)

Music video
- "Ride or Die" on YouTube

"Ride or Die" is the debut single by South Korean singer Evan. It was released on June 22, 2026, through Belift Lab, and is the first single from his debut extended play (EP), Death of Me.

== Background and release ==
In March 2026, Belift Lab announced that Heeseung had left his boy band Enhypen to pursue a solo career while remaining with the label. This caused many fans to start a change.org petition to reverse the decision, which the label reasserted that he would not join back. The label announced in April that Heeseung's new stage name would be "Evan". In May, it was confirmed that Evan would be debuting in June. On June 22, he released "Ride or Die" and accompanied with a B-side track "Overflow".

== Composition ==
"Ride or Die" was composed and written by Evan, Apro, Rob Nelsen, and Paak. It was described as alternative rock with grunge and punk influences while "Overflow" as a laid back indie pop track.

== Chart performance ==
The song peaked at 49 on the Circle Digital Chart.

== Track listing ==
Ride or Die track listing
No.	Title	Writer(s)	Producer(s)	Length
1.	"Ride or Die"	Evan; Rob Nelsen; Apro; Paak	Evan; Inverness; Apro^{[a]}	2:17
2.	"Overflow"	Evan; Wyatt Sanders; Ian Jeffery Thomas; Mosaic; Paak	Evan; Ian Jeffrey Thomas; Mosaic	2:53
Total length:				5:10

=== Notes ===
- ^{^[a]} signifies an additional producer

== Credits and personnel ==
All credits adapted from Tidal.

- Evan – songwriter, producer, vocals, background vocals (all tracks)
- Iverness – producer, songwriter, bass, drums, guitar, keyboards, programming, synthesizer (track 1)
- Apro – songwriter, additional producer, drums, synthesizer (track 1)
- Paak – songwriter (all tracks)
- Ian Jeffrey Thomas – producer, songwriter, drums, keyboards, programming, synthesizer (track 2)
- Wyatt Sanders – songwriter, background vocals, programming (track 2)
- Mosaic – producer, songwriter, bass, guitar, keyboards, synthesizer (track 2)
- Chris Gehringer – mastering (all tracks)
- Tom Norris – mixing (track 1)
- Michael Freeman – mixing (track 2)
