= O-RLY? =

Single by Nexz

from the EP O-RLY?
- Language: Korean
- Released: April 28, 2025
- Length: 2:46
- Label: JYP
- Composers: Ronny Svendsen; Heffybeluga; JOP (NOR); Maxx Song; chAN's; Sooyoon
- Lyricist: YIYUJIN

Nexz singles chronology
| "Nallina" (2024) | "O-RLY?" (2025) | "One Bite" (2025) |

Music video
- "O-RLY?" on YouTube

O-RLY? is the fifth Korean-language single by Japanese boy band Nexz. It was released on April 28, 2025, by JYP Entertainment for their second EP of the same name O-RLY?.

Professional ratings
Review scores
| Source | Rating |
|---|---|
| IZM | 2.5/5 stars |

== Background and release ==
On April 7, 2025 JYP Entertainment first revealed the timetable and schedule for a Nexz EP called O-RLY? on their social media accounts. Two days later JYP posted the track list and credits for the comeback in which it was confirmed that O-RLY? would be the title track. On April 28, 2025, both "O-RLY?" and their second EP O-RLY? were released.

== Composition ==
"O-RLY?" lyrics were written by YIYUJIN and composed by Ronny Svendsen, Heffybeluga, JOP(NOR), Maxx Song, chAN's and Sooyoon. The song is composed in the key A minor and has 102 beats per minute and a running time of 2 minutes and 46 seconds.

== Promotion ==
Nexz held their first comeback stage for "O-RLY?" on Mnet M Countdown on May 1. Nexz also performed on three other music programs in the first week of promotion: Music Bank on May 2 Show! Music Core, on May 3, and SBS's Inkigayo on May 4.

== Music video ==
The music video shows Nexz, who consumed sugar such as candy and drinks, gain amazing powers such as running between buildings like the main character in a cartoon. It was directed by Seong of Digipedi

== Charts ==
Chart performance for "O-RLY?"
| Chart (2025) | Peak position |
|---|---|
| South Korea (Circle) | 165 |

== Release history ==
Release history
| Region | Date | Format | Label |
|---|---|---|---|
| Various | April 28, 2025 | Digital download; streaming | JYP |
