= Na Haeun =

South Korean singer (born 2009)

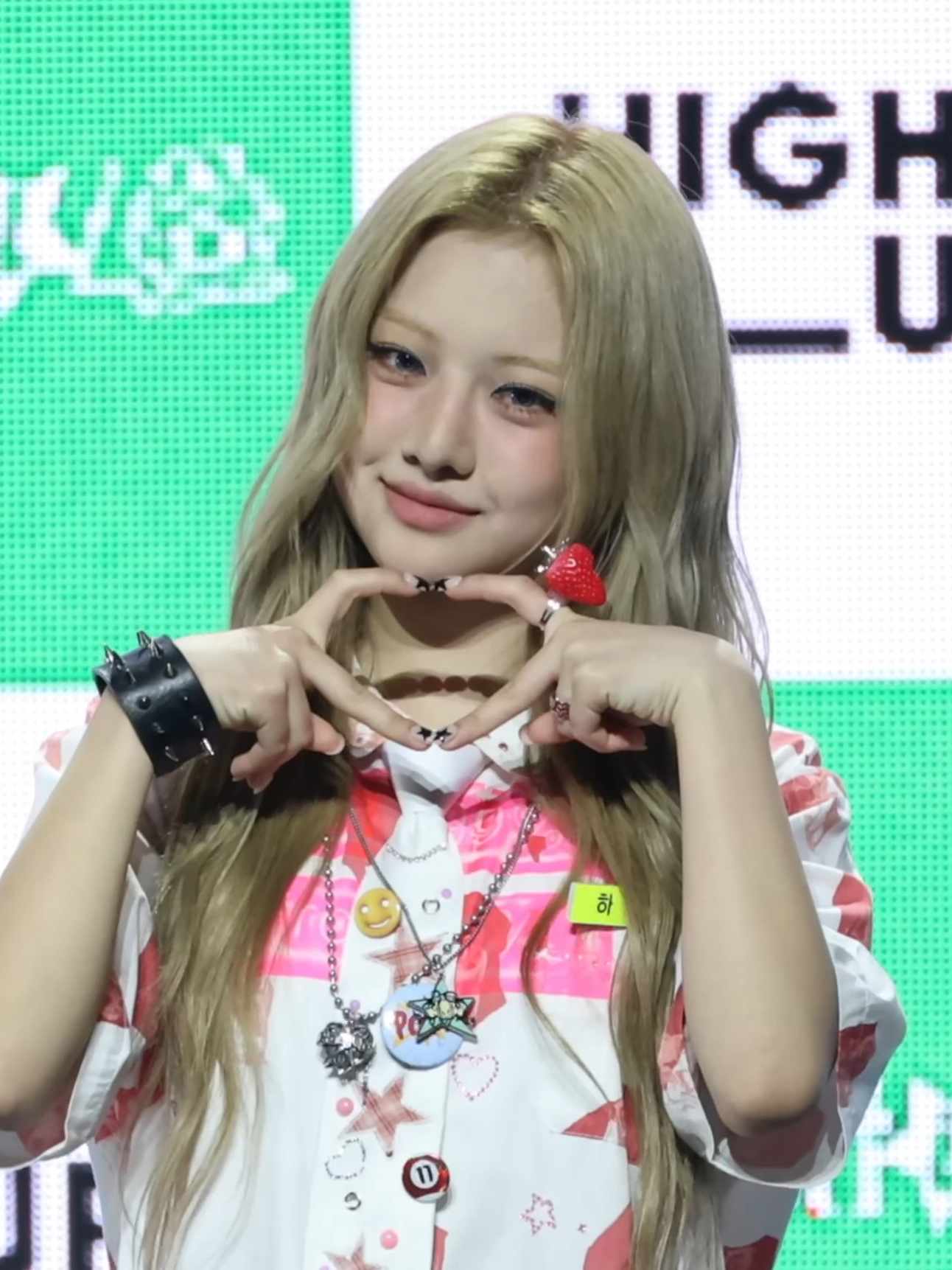
- Haeun in 2026
- Born: January 16, 2009 (age 17); Daegu, South Korea
- Occupations: Singer; dancer
- Musical career
- Genre: K-pop
- Years active: 2018–present
- Labels: SM; High Up
- Member of: Unchild

YouTube information
- Channel: [Awesome Haeun]어썸하은
- Years active: 2014–2022
- Genre: Cover dance
- Subscribers: 5.03 million
- Views: 893 million

Korean name
- Hangul: 나하은
- RR: Na Haeun
- MR: Na Haŭn

Na Haeun (Korean: 나하은; born January 16, 2009), known mononymously as Haeun, is a South Korean singer, dancer, and former YouTuber. She began appearing on television at an early age, appearing on programs such as Star King and K-pop Star, and gained recognition within the industry as a dance prodigy. She launched the YouTube channel Awesome Haeun in 2014, uploading K-pop dance covers and accumulating over 2 million subscribers by 2018. In 2022, she signed a contract with SM Entertainment as a trainee but left the company two years later and subsequently joined High Up Entertainment, debuting as a member of the girl group Unchild in 2026.

== Early life ==
Na Haeun was born on January 16, 2009 in Daegu, South Korea. She has a younger sister, Na Hayoon, who is a kid influencer on TikTok. When her mother was pregnant with her younger sister, she listened to upbeat music to lift her spirits, and to cheer her mother, she began dancing in front of the television at around three or four years old.

== Career ==
=== 2013–2018: Dance covers and YouTube launch ===
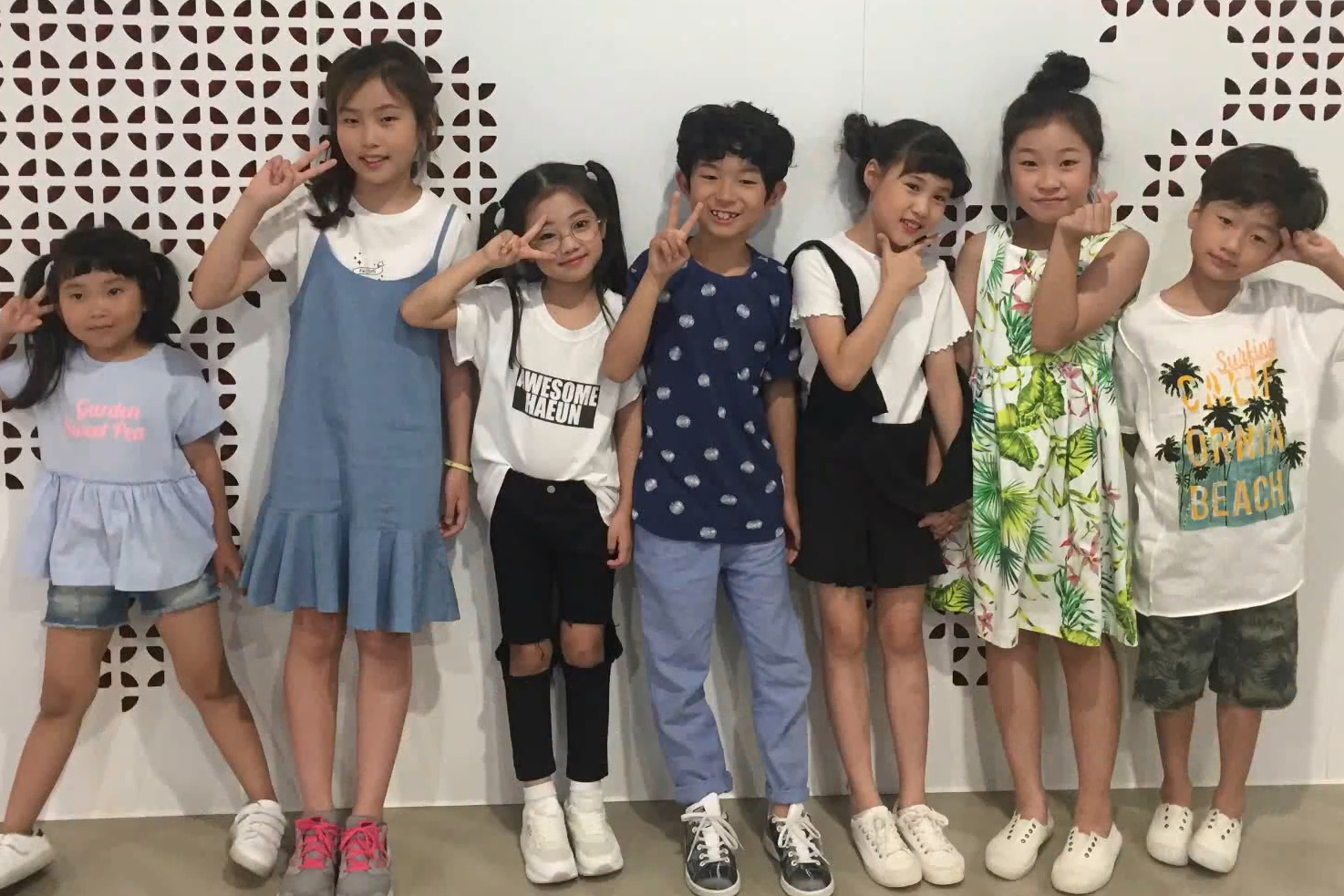
Haeun (third from left) as part of the cast of Bogo Nolja, 2017.

Haeun began appearing on television at a young age. In 2013, she appeared on Star King, where a dance alongside HyunA earned her the nickname "Baby HyunA." At age six, she participated in the fourth season of K-pop Star in 2014, becoming the show's youngest contestant. Netizens and judges reacted positively, praising her choreography in performances of Girls' Generation's "Girls' Generation" and Sistar's "Touch My Body." Despite the acclaim, she was eliminated, with judge You Hee-yeol noting it would be difficult for her to advance in later rounds.

That same year she launched the YouTube channel Awesome Haeun, where she uploaded dance covers of idols such as Twice, BTS, and Exo, and collaborated with groups including Nature. She participated in the 2017 and 2018 Melon Music Awards, introducing the Best Dance nominees through choreographed performances as part of an idol dance parade.

=== 2018–2022: First digital singles ===
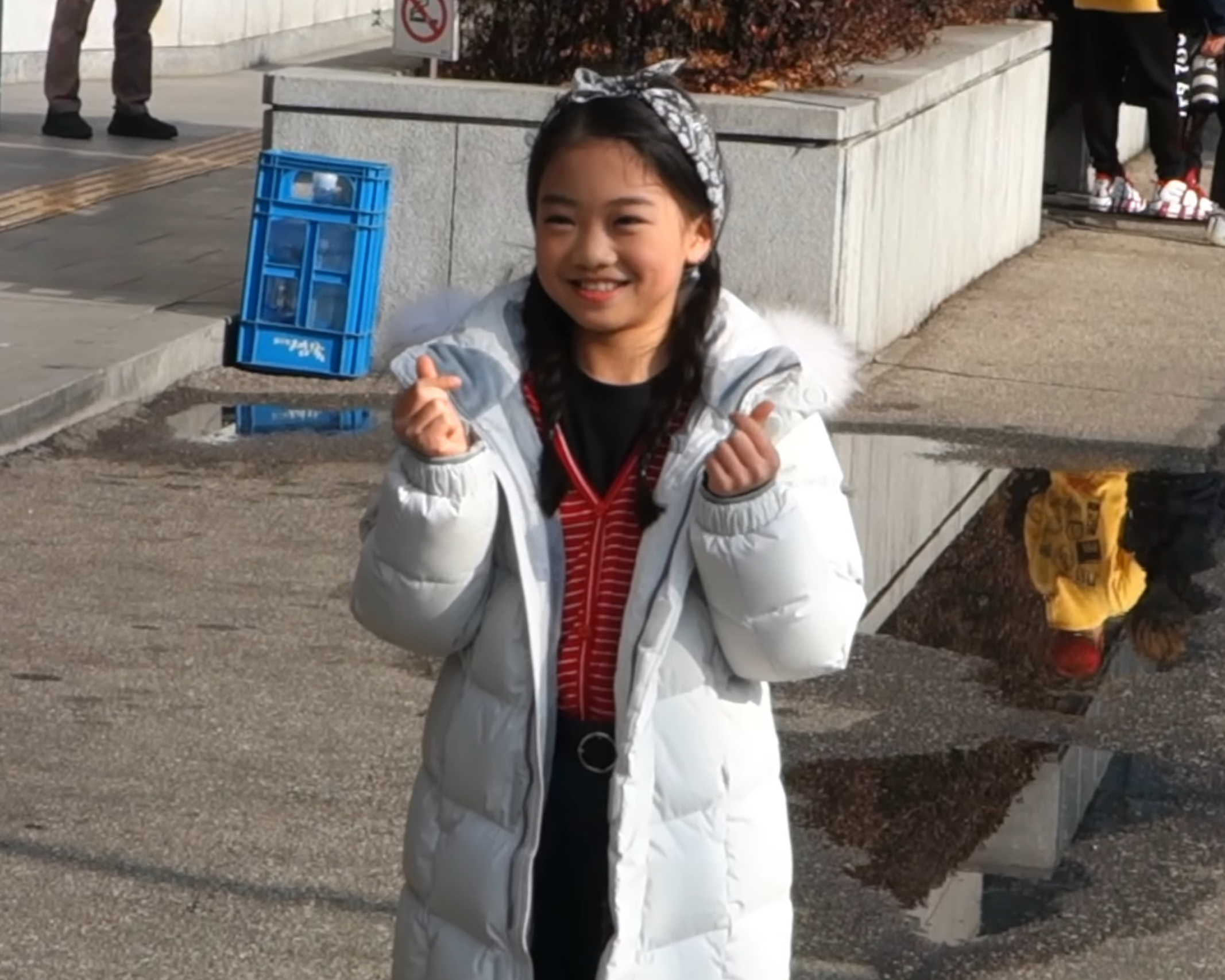
Haeun before a taping of Happy Together, 2018.

On January 25, 2018, Haeun released the single "So Special." A notice accompanying the video stated the song was not intended as an official debut but was released because she wanted to have her own song, and that she was not preparing for an idol debut. She continued uploading to YouTube, where several of her videos went viral. Her November 2018 dance cover of Jennie's "Solo" had amassed over 4 million views by December 2018. That same month, her YouTube channel had surpassed 2.43 million subscribers.

She began modeling in 2019, appearing in pictorials for the outdoor brand Nepa Kids' spring campaign. On December 24, 2021, she released her second single "Butterfly".

=== 2022–2026: K-pop trainee ===
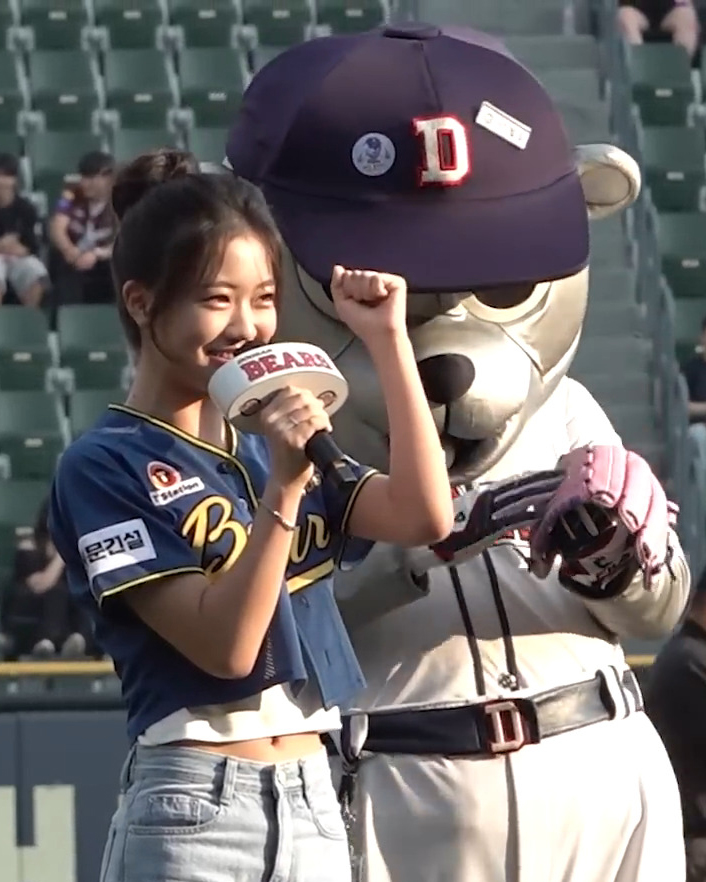
Haeun with the Doosan Bears, 2024.

In April 2022, SM Entertainment announced it had signed Haeun to an exclusive contract, stating she would be part of the next generation of K‑pop artists under the company's training and support. After two years of training at SM, Haeun was expected not to debut in the company's next girl group since Aespa, which became Hearts2Hearts, and by August 2024 she had reportedly left the company.

After leaving SM Entertainment, public interest in Haeun's activities intensified. She shared updates about her life, including throwing the ceremonial first pitch at a KBO League game between the Kiwoom Heroes and the Doosan Bears. Several agencies expressed interest in signing her, and she was photographed attending a STAYC concert. The next month, Haeun signed an exclusive contract with High Up Entertainment, the company associated with STAYC and their production team Black Eyed Pilseung. She was considered a likely candidate for High Up's upcoming girl group, following the company's global auditions for new members.

In November 2025, she appeared in a photoshoot for GQ Korea, presenting a new look ahead of her expected debut with a High Up girl group and confirming she had been training with the aim of debuting. By March 2026, it was announced that High Up's new girl group would debut in April. That month, all members, including Haeun, were revealed as members of the group Unchild.

=== 2026–present: Debut with Unchild ===
Haeun debuted with Unchild on April 21, 2026, with the group's single album We Are Unchild. The debut was commercially successful, with Haeun saying she was happy with the members, describing their relationship as sister‑like and likening the group to "an Avengers team."

== Discography ==
List of singles, showing year released, and name of the album
Title	Year	Album
"So Special"	2018	Non-album single
"Butterfly"	2021	Non-album single
