= Beat-Boxer =

Single by Nexz

from the EP Beat-Boxer
- Language: Korean
- Released: October 27, 2025
- Length: 2:36
- Label: JYP
- Composers: Ronny Svendsen; Anne Judith Wik; Nermin Harambašić; Boots Ottestad; Carl Ryden; Jackie Hill Perry
- Lyricists: Wihana; WWWave; WUTAN; Leslie

Nexz singles chronology
"One Bite" (2025)	"Beat-Boxer" (2025)	"Mmchk" (2026)

Music video
- "Beat-Boxer" on YouTube

Beat-Boxer is the sixth Korean-language single by Japanese boy band Nexz. It was released on October 27, 2025, by JYP Entertainment for their third EP of the same name Beat-Boxer.

== Composition ==
"Beat-Boxer" lyrics were written by Wihana, WWWafe, WUTAN and Leslie. It was composed by Ronny Svendsen, Anne Judith Wik, Nermin Harambašić, Boots Ottestad, Carl Ryden and Jackie Hill Perry. "Beat-Boxer" Is described as having an 2000s hip-hop and dance sound, that delivers a fresh and intense image reminiscent of boxing and a dance floor at the same time.

The song is composed in the key C-sharp Major and has 120 beats per minute and a running time of 2 minutes and 36 seconds. The English version of the song was released on October 31, 2025.

== Promotion ==
Nexz performed "Beat-Boxer" on music programs such as Show Champion on November 5, SBS's Inkigayo on November 9. Music Bank on October 31, November 7, November 14 and Show! Music Core on October 30.

== Music video ==
The music video show the Nexz members who turned into boxers climb into a boxing ring and perform. At the end of the video, there is a dance battle of the three teams of Nexz. It was directed by Bang Jae-yeob.

== Accolades ==
List of awards and nominations received by "Beat-Boxer"
Ceremony	Year	Category	Result	Ref.
TMELive International Music Awards	2026	Global Trend Songs Top 10	Won	

== Charts ==
Chart performance for "Beat-Boxer"
Chart (2025)	Peak position
South Korea (Circle)	120

== Release history ==
Release history
Region	Date	Format	Label
Various	October 27, 2025	Digital download; streaming	JYP
