= Mmchk =

Single by Nexz

from the EP Mmchk
- Language: Korean
- Released: April 27, 2026
- Length: 2:39
- Label: JYP
- Composers: Ronny Svendsen; Anne Judith Wik; Heffybeluga; Stian Nyhammer Olsen; Bobii Lewis; JOP; Ameline
- Lyricists: Gu Samyoung; ChaMane; Yuki; Hyui; Tomoya

Nexz singles chronology
"Beat-Boxer" (2025)	"Mmchk" (2026)

Music video
- "Mmchk" on YouTube

Mmchk is the seventh Korean-language single by Japanese boy band Nexz. It was released on April 27, 2026, by JYP Entertainment for their second single album of the same name Mmchk.

Professional ratings
Review scores
Source	Rating
IZM	3/5 stars

== Background and release ==
On April 6, 2026, JYP Entertainment first released a trailer on its social media platforms announcing that Nexz would have a comeback on April 27 called 'Mmchk'. Concept photos of each member and group photos was first posted on April 14. The highlight melody was released on April 17, in which "Mmchk" could first be heard. Music video teasers for "Mmchk" was released on JYP's social media accounts on May 23 and 24.

== Composition ==
"Mmchk" lyrics were written by Gu Samyoung, ChaMane and Nexz members Yuki, Hyui and Tomoya. It was composed by Ronny Svendsen, Anne Judith Wik, Heffybeluga, Stian Nyhammer Olsen, Bobii Lewis, JOP and Ameline. "Mmchk" is described as a bass house-based dance track combining playful rapping and an addictive beat. The song shapes around the idea of acting freely without being bound by set manners or outside expectations.

The song is composed in the key E minor and has 120 beats per minute and a running time of 2 minutes and 39 seconds.

== Promotion ==
Nexz held their first comeback stage for "Mmchk" on Mnet M Countdown on April 30. Nexz also performed on three other music programs in the first week of promotion: Music Bank on May 1 Show! Music Core, on May 2, and SBS's Inkigayo on May 3.

== Accolades ==
Music program awards for "Mmchk'"
Program	Date	Ref.
Show Champion	May 6, 2026	

== Charts ==
Chart performance for "Mmchk"
Chart (2026)	Peak position
South Korea (Circle)	95
Japan (JPN Download)	25

== Release history ==
Release history
Region	Date	Format	Label
Various	April 27, 2026	Digital download; streaming	JYP
