= Nallina =

EP by Nexz
- Released: November 18, 2024
- Genre: K-pop
- Length: 13:58
- Language: Korean
- Label: JYP

Nexz chronology
Ride the Vibe (Japanese Ver.) / Keep on Moving (2024)	Nallina (2024)	O-rly (2025)

Singles from Nallina
- 1. "Nallina" Released: November 18, 2024

Nallina is the first Korean-language EP by global boy band Nexz. It was released on November 18, 2024, by JYP Entertainment. The album consists of five tracks, including the title track, "Nallina".

== Themes and lyrics ==
Nexz released teaser captures the group's free-spirited energy, with no idea where it will go. They run down the stairs and jump outside with great enthusiasm, while the seven members work together to move around the city streets, rooftops of buildings, and inside restaurants, capturing everyone's attention. Leader Tomoya, who uses a camcorder in his hand to film the people causing chaos in their daily lives, makes eye contact with the camera with a meaningful expression at the end of the video, stimulating curiosity toward the complete music video.

The lead single 'Nallina' is a dance song with a unique percussion sound and moombahton rhythm, and its various compositions, including various rhythm variations and dance breaks, are points of appreciation. JYP representative producer Park Jin-young participated in the lyrics, and Oneye, Ninos Hanna, and Restart collaborated.

== Commercial performance ==
The EP sold 164,763 copies in South Korea and 22,159 copies in Japan. It peaked at number three on the Circle Album Chart, number 33 on the Billboard Japan Hot Albums and number six on the Oricon Albums Chart.

== Track listing ==
Nallina track listing
No.	Title	Lyrics	Music	Arrangement	Length
1.	"Hard"	Leslie (XYXX); Ahn Ji-soo (Onclassa)	Benjamin 55; Stary55; Aiden 'ADN' Lewis; Sam SZND	Benjamin 55; Stary55	2:21
2.	"Nallina"	Kim Jae-won (Jam Factory); J.Y. Park "The Asiansoul"; Lee Hae-won; Moon Yeo-reum (Jam Factory); Yu Ma-re (Jam Factory)	Oneye; Ninos Hanna; William Segerdahl; Niklas Jarelius Persson; Adam Benyahia; 153/Joombas	Oneye; Persson; Benyahia; Restart; Chae Gang-hae	2:42
3.	"Next Zeneration"	Tomoya; Haru; Hyui	Chris Alice; Young Won-hee; MOGT (Solsire)	MOGT; Young	3:05
4.	"Eye to Eye"	Kim Su-ah (Jamfactory)	Nild (MonoTree); BB Elliot; Theo Lawrence; Julia Finnseter	Nild	2:43
5.	"Keep on Moving" (Korean version)	J.Y. Park "The Asiansoul"	Garden; Tim Tan; Ciara Muscat	Garden	3:06
Total length:					13:58

Nallina – CD only bonus track
No.	Title	Length
6.	"Z Side_241008"	9:29
Total length:		23:26
