= We Are Unchild =

- Digital cover

Single album by Unchild
- Released: April 21, 2026
- Length: 4:29
- Languages: Korean, English
- Labels: High Up; Kakao

Unchild chronology
We Are Unchild (2026)	Ting Ting (2026)

Singles from We Are Unchild
- 1. "Unchild" Released: April 21, 2026

We Are Unchild is the debut single album by South Korean girl group Unchild. It was released on April 21, 2026, by High Up Entertainment, containing two tracks, including the lead single and title track "Unchild".

== Background and release ==
On December 3, 2025, High Up Entertainment announced that Unchild were expected to debut in the first half of 2026. On March 25, 2026, it was announced that group's debut single album would be released in April and titled We Are Unchild. The following day, the concept video for "Un-" was released. On March 27, 2026, the concept video for the members was released. On April 1, 2026, it was announced that the debut single album would be released on the April 21. On April 10, 2026, concept photos were released. On April 17, 2026, the first music video teaser for "Unchild" was released, the second one was released on April 19, and the music video and full album audio were released on April 21, 2026.

== Composition ==
"We Are Unchild" symbolizes Unchild taking their first steps. The concept behind the album is of the girls embracing a grand dream that could subvert the world, with the message that even if the road ahead is uncertain, the uncertainty will turn into an adventure as long as they are together, and even if the world says they are reckless, they are still determined to subvert the world.

== Track listing ==
We Are Unchild track listing
No.	Title	Lyrics	Music	Arrangement	Length
1.	"Unchild"	Oh Hyun-sun; Ondine; Minsu; Kim In-hyeong (Jamfactory); Lee Seu-ran	Rado; Flyt; Z4; Maria	Flyt; Rado; Z4	2:28
2.	"Energy"	Ondine; Jiggy	Rado; Flyt; Z4	Flyt; Rado	2:01
Total length:					4:29

== Release history ==
Release history for We Are Unchild
Region	Date	Format	Label
South Korea	April 21, 2026	CD	High Up; Kakao
Various	April 21, 2026	Digital download; streaming	High Up; Kakao
