= Both Sides (EP) =

- Digital cover

EP by NCT JNJM
- Released: February 23, 2026
- Genres: Hip-hop; R&B
- Length: 16:02
- Languages: Korean; English
- Labels: SM; Kakao

NCT chronology
Wishlist (2026)	Both Sides (2026)	Ode to Love (2026)

Singles from Both Sides
- 1. "Both Sides" Released: February 23, 2026

Both Sides is the debut extended play (EP) by the South Korean duo NCT JNJM, the seventh sub-unit of the South Korean boy band NCT. It was released on February 23, 2026, by SM Entertainment through Kakao Entertainment. The EP contains six tracks, including the lead single of the same name.

== Background and release ==
In early 2026, SM Entertainment announced the formation of NCT JNJM, a new sub-unit of the South Korean boy band NCT, featuring members Jeno and Jaemin. The duo has a shared professional history spanning over a decade, beginning with their trainee period and continuing through their debut and subsequent activities in NCT Dream. On February 3, SM initiated the duo's debut countdown by releasing a promotional schedule for their first EP, titled Both Sides. The rollout, which utilizes a conceptual "photocopier" aesthetic to revealed release dates, was scheduled to include a series of image and story trailers beginning on February 7. According to the announcement, the project aims to highlight the individual characteristics of both members and their collective synergy. On February 22, the music video teaser for "Both Sides" was released. The next day, NCT JNJM debuted and released the title track's music video.

== Promotion ==
The promotional campaign for Both Sides began on February 3, 2026, with the release of a schedule poster featuring a "photocopier" aesthetic, where the rollout dates appeared as printed documents. The marketing strategy focused heavily on a "cinematic" narrative, utilizing the dual themes of "Day:Office" and "Night" to illustrate the members' transition from ordinary office workers to secret agents.

Between February 9 and 12, SM released a series of mood films and teaser images exploring the concept of "ambivalence". These films utilized a multi-ending format centered on a coin toss to determine the characters' fates. The narrative presented two distinct outcomes: one where the duo evolves into "iconic rivals" who complement each other's deficiencies, and another where they collectively defect from their organization to seek freedom. Visual teasers further emphasized the contrast between the two members, portraying Jeno with a "chic and orderly" persona and Jaemin with a "free-spirited and bold" demeanor. In the week leading up to the release, the group conducted a "relay promotion" consisting of physical events in Seoul. On February 20, two sessions of "Both Sides: The Pre-Listening Party" were held in Seongdong-gu, allowing fans to hear the full album prior to its official launch. This was followed by a two-day exhibition titled "Both Sides: The Preview" at Anderson C Seongsu on February 21 and 22, which featured highlight medleys, visual displays, and official merchandise. On the day of the launch, February 23, Jeno and Jaemin hosted a live countdown broadcast on YouTube and TikTok to discuss the album's production and perform an unboxing.

== Composition ==
Both Sides consists of six tracks that explore various sub-genres of hip-hop and R&B, focusing on the vocal and rap contrast between Jeno and Jaemin. The EP is thematically framed around a "cheerful dilemma", presenting dual perspectives on artistic identity and personal growth. The title track, "Both Sides", is a hip-hop dance song characterized by sophisticated sound design and fluid drum beats. The track utilizes an energetic production to complement "witty" vocal and rap deliveries, with lyrics that playfully describe a "happy choice" between two distinct charms. The title track's themes of duality are further reflected in its performance. The choreography for "Both Sides" visually translates the song's title through contrasting directional movements, such as "left and right" or "front and back" formations. It incorporates a hip-hop-influenced groove paired with "kitsch" hand movements and witty gestures, intended to highlight the individual performance styles and collective synergy of the duo.

"What It Is" transitions into pop R&B, featuring an uptempo groove and rhythmic progression. The song is noted for its "restrained sexiness" and dreamy atmosphere, created through the members' contrasting vocal tones. Member Jaemin is credited as the sole lyricist for the track, which sensually depicts the growing tension and attraction between two individuals. The EP continues with "Sexier", a hip-hop dance track incorporating bright synthesizers and an addictive chorus. Its lyrics wittily address a bold, provocative chemistry. "I.D.O.L." is an uptempo pop song rooted in Miami bass, contrasting heavy 808 kicks with melodic synth riffs. The song's narrative focuses on the professional attitude of an idol and offers a romanticized perspective on the relationship between artists and their fans. "Hashtag" draws influence from late-2000s Southern hip-hop, blending it with modern sound design to create an "emotional" hip-hop atmosphere. The track highlights the contrast between low-tone rapping and melodic sequences, carrying a message of self-confidence in the face of public scrutiny. It also includes "Wind Up", an uptempo hip-hop track featuring heavy drums and horn arrangements. The lyrics employ baseball metaphors, specifically the "wind-up" motion, to deliver a message of self-belief and encouragement for youth pursuing their goals.

== Track listing ==
Both Sides track listing
No.	Title	Lyrics	Music	Arrangement	Length
1.	"Both Sides"	Jo Yoon-kyung	Cyrus Villanueva; Niklas Jarelius Persson	Villanueva; Persson	2:51
2.	"I.D.O.L."	Benley (UP)	Jimmy Burney; Softserveboy; Magsy	Softserveboy	2:41
3.	"What It Is"	Jaemin	Villanueva; Tim Tan; Aaron Theodore Berton; Matthew Crawford; Hautboi Rich; QRated Songs	Theo & The Climb	2:51
4.	"Hashtag"	Lee Seu-ran	Buggy (UP); Wutan (UP); Gustav Landell; Lara Andersson	Buggy; Gustav Landell	2:37
5.	"Wind Up"	Cho Yu-ri	Jackson Hirsh; Jeremy "Tay" Jasper; Mike Adubato	Rence; Adubato	2:40
6.	"Sexier"	Lee Yi-jin	Mich Hansen; Samuel Ledet; Daecolm	Cutfather; Ledet	2:22
Total length:					16:02

== Credits and personnel ==
Credits adapted from the EP's liner notes.

Studio

- SM Yellow Tail Studio – recording, digital editing (track 1, 4)
- SM Azure Studio – recording (track 2, 5–6), digital editing (track 2, 5)
- SM Aube Studio – recording, digital editing (track 3)
- Sound Pool Studio – recording (track 5)
- SM Wavelet Studio – recording, digital editing (track 6)
- SM Concert Hall Studio – mixing (track 1)
- SM Blue Ocean Studio – mixing (track 2)
- SM Blue Cup Studio – mixing (track 3, 6)
- SM Starlight Studio – mixing (track 4)
- SM Big Shot Studio – mixing (track 5)
- Sterling Sound – mastering (all tracks)

Personnel

- SM Entertainment – executive producer
- NCT JNJM – vocals, background vocals (all tracks)
  - Jaemin – lyrics (track 3)
- Jo Yoon-kyung – lyrics (track 1)
- Cyrus Villanueva – producer, arrangement, background vocals, keyboard, synthesizer, programming (track 1), composition (track 1, 3)
- Niklas Jarelius Persson – producer, composition, arrangement, background vocals, keyboard, synthesizer, programming (track 1)
- Benley (UP) – lyrics (track 2)
- Jimmy Burney – composition (track 2)
- Softserveboy – producer, composition, arrangement, programming (track 2)
- Colin Magalong a.k.a. Magsy – composition (track 2)
- Tim Tan – composition (track 3)
- Aaron Theodore Berton (Theo & The Climb) – producer, composition, arrangement, synthesizer, programming (track 3)
- Matthew Crawford (Theo & The Climb) – producer, composition, arrangement, synthesizer, programming (track 3)
- Hautboi Rich – composition (track 3)
- QRated Songs – composition (track 3)
- Lee Seu-ran – lyrics (track 4)
- Buggy (UP) – producer, composition, arrangement, programming (track 4)
- Wutan (UP) – composition (track 4)
- Gustav Landell – producer, composition, arrangement (track 4)
- Lara Andersson – composition (track 4)
- Cho Yu-ri – lyrics (track 5)
- Jackson Hirsh a.k.a. Rence – producer, composition, arrangement (track 5)
- Jeremy "Tay" Jasper – composition (track 5)
- Mike Adubato – producer, composition, arrangement (track 5)
- Yi Yi-jin – lyrics (track 6)
- Mich Hansen a.k.a. Cutfather – producer, composition, arrangement (track 6)
- Samuel Ledet – producer, composition, arrangement (track 6)
- Daecolm – composition (track 6)
- Jsong – vocal directing (track 1–2), background vocals (track 4)
- Joowon – vocal directing (track 3, 5), background vocals (track 1–3, 5–6)
- Young Chance – vocal directing (track 3, 5)
- Ondine – vocal directing (track 4, 6)
- Noh Min-ji – recording, digital editing (track 1, 4)
- Kim Jae-yeon – recording (track 2, 5–6), digital editing (track 2, 5)
- Kim Hyo-joon – recording, digital editing (track 3)
- Kim Dong-il – recording (track 5)
- Kang Eun-ji – recording, digital editing (track 6)
- Nam Koong-jin – mixing (track 1)
- Kim Cheol-sun – mixing (track 2)
- Jung Eui-seok – mixing (track 3, 6)
- Jeong Yoo-ra – mixing (track 4)
- Lee Min-kyu – mixing (track 5)
- Joe LaPorta – mastering (all tracks)

== Charts ==
=== Weekly charts ===
Weekly chart performance for Both Sides
Chart (2026)	Peak position
Japanese Albums (Oricon)	2
Japanese Combined Albums (Oricon)	3
Japanese Hot Albums (Billboard Japan)	22
South Korean Albums (Circle)	3

=== Monthly charts ===
Monthly chart performance for Both Sides
Chart (2026)	Position
Japanese Albums (Oricon)	16
South Korean Albums (Circle)	5

== Certifications ==
Certifications for Both Sides
Region	Certification	Certified units/sales
South Korea (KMCA)	Platinum	250,000^{^}
^{^} Shipments figures based on certification alone.

== Release history ==
Release history for Both Sides
Region	Date	Format	Label
South Korea	February 23, 2026	CD	SM; Kakao
Various	February 23, 2026	Digital download; streaming	SM; Kakao
