= 17.7 =

EP by Hiipe Princess
- Released: May 27, 2026
- Length: 13:36
- Language: Korean, English, Japanese
- Label: Chapter-I; Amoeba Culture; Warner
- Producer: Gaeko

Singles from 17.7
- 1. "Stolen" Released: April 29, 2026

17.7 is the debut extended play (EP) by South Korean–Japanese girl group Hiipe Princess. The EP was released on May 27, 2026, by Chapter-I, Amoeba Culture and Warner. Physically, it is available in three versions and contains five tracks with "Stolen" as its lead single and title track.

== Background ==
In December 2025, it was reported that Hiipe Princess would debut in the first half of 2026.

== Release and promotion ==
In April 2026, Hiipe Princess confirmed their official debut with their first mini-album 17.7, named after the members' average age at the time of the group's formation. The album was produced by Dynamic Duo, with member Gaeko contributing lyrics. On April 29, 2026, they released the debut single "Stolen" with an accompanying music video. On May 11, they released a Korean version of "Stolen" as part of their debut mini-album rollout and made their first appearance on M Countdown.

On May 27, 2026, Hiipe Princess debuted with their mini-album 17.7, which featured five tracks.

== Musical style ==
Newsis described the group's sound as embracing cultures without prejudice, noting that they did not rely on their agency's identity but instead embraced an autonomous spirit similar to a "young creator crew" in establishing their own identity.

== Track listing ==
17.7 track listing
No.	Title	Lyrics	Music	Arrangement	Length
1.	"Stolen"	Gaeko; Kilmperboy; Cubeats; Lisa Pac	Kilmperboy; Cubeats; Lisa Pac; IOAH	IOAH	2:44
2.	"One Day"				3:09
3.	"Hoppin'"				2:27
4.	"Daisy" (H//PE P Ver.)				2:49
5.	"Good!" (H//PE P Ver.)				2:27
Total length:					13:36

== Charts ==
=== Weekly charts ===
Weekly chart performance for 17.7
Chart (2026)	Peak position
Japanese Albums (Oricon)	23

== Release history ==
Release history for 17.7
Region	Date	Format	Label
South Korea	May 27, 2026	CD; digital download; streaming	Chapter-I; Amoeba Culture; Warner
Various	May 27, 2026	Digital download; streaming	Chapter-I; Amoeba Culture; Warner
