= Death of Me (EP) =

EP by Evan
- Released: September 7, 2026
- Genre: K-pop
- Length: 22:27
- Languages: Korean; English
- Label: Belift Lab
- Producers: Evan; Apro; Boy Blue; Søren Breum; Chiller (Dblv); Coll!n (Dblv); Elias Edman; Gabe Greenland; Imad Royal; Inverness; Mosaic; Owl (Dblv); Ian Jeffrey Thomas; Vera; Vtl

Singles from Death of Me
- 1. "Ride or Die" Released: June 22, 2026; 2. "Death of Me" Released: September 7, 2026

Death of Me is the debut extended play (EP) by South Korean singer Evan. It was released on September 7, 2026, through Belift Lab. The EP consists of eight tracks, including lead single "Death of Me". Its first single, "Ride or Die" was released on June 22 with accompanying B-side "Overflow". The EP's lead single, "Death of Me", was released concurrently with the EP.

== Background ==
On March 10, Belift Lab announced that Heeseung would be leaving Enhypen to pursue a solo career while remaining with the label. Following fan protests, Belift asserted that Heeseung would not rejoin Enhypen on March 15. On April 8, Belift announced that Heeseung would change his stage name to "Evan".

On August 9, Belift Lab announced that Evan's debut EP, Death of Me, would be released on September 7. Beginning on August 25, track samplers were released through Evan's official social media channels.

== Composition ==
The album's tracks have been described as pop, R&B, alternative rock, UK garage, indie pop, and dream pop. "Ride or Die" is an alternative rock song with grunge and punk influences, while "Overflow" is an indie pop track. The title track "Death of Me" is a pop and R&B song about moving forward without losing oneself. "Not Enough" is about desiring more in life, while "Noise" is about ignoring the noise to move at one's own pace. "Twilight" contains UK garage beats that have been characterized as "sensual". "Immature" has lyrics about progressing despite awkwardness. The final track, "Going Home", has been called a dream pop song comparing the journey of achieving goals to "the road home".

== Track listing ==
Death of Me track listing
No.	Title	Writer(s)	Producer(s)	Length
1.	"Not Enough"	Evan; Boy Blue; Blaise Railey; Park Woo-hyun	Evan; Boy Blue	2:27
2.	"Noise"	William Asingh; Søren Breum; Wilhelm Börjesson; Von Tiger; Nirob Islam; Evan; Park Woo-hyun	Vera; Søren Breum	3:09
3.	"Ride or Die"	Rob Nelsen; Evan; Apro; Paak	Inverness; Evan; Apro^{[a]}	2:17
4.	"Death of Me"	Imad Royal; David Charles Fischer; Evan; Maryjane (Lalala Studio); Kim Ba-da (Mumw); Lim Soo-ran (Lalala Studio); Lim Kyu-hui (Lalala Studio); Kim Hwa-rang (Lalala Studio); Lee-hwa (Mumw)	Imad Royal	3:06
5.	"Twilight"	Elias Edman; Chris Collins; Noak Hellsing; Evan; Ned Houston; Park Woo-hyun	Elias Edman	2:42
6.	"Immature"	Evan; Gabe Greenland; Apro; Vtl; Paak; An Young-ju (Mumw); Park Woo-hyun; Kim Ba-da (Mumw); Lim Soo-ran (Lalala Studio); Min_n (Mumw)	Evan; Gabe Greenland; Apro; Vtl	2:08
7.	"Overflow"	Evan; Wyatt Sanders; Ian Jeffery Thomas; Mosaic; Paak	Evan; Ian Jeffrey Thomas; Mosaic	2:53
8.	"Going Home"	Evan; Chiller (Dblv); Coll!n (Dblv); Owl (Dblv); Click (Dblv); Saizy (Dblv); July (Dblv)	Evan; Chiller (Dblv); Coll!n (Dblv); Owl (Dblv)	3:45
Total length:				22:27

=== Notes ===
- ^{^[a]} signifies an additional producer

== Charts ==
=== Weekly charts ===
Weekly chart performance for Death of Me
Chart (2026)	Peak position
Belgian Albums (Ultratop Flanders)	75
Belgian Albums (Ultratop Wallonia)	105
French Albums (SNEP)	81
Japanese Albums (Oricon)	6
Japanese Combined Albums (Oricon)	6
Japanese Hot Albums (Billboard Japan)	15
Portuguese Albums (AFP)	190
Scottish Albums (Official Charts)	59
South Korean Albums (Circle)	2
UK Albums Sales (Official Charts)	85
US Billboard 200	49
US World Albums (Billboard)	2

=== Monthly charts ===
Monthly chart performance for Death of Me
Chart (2026)	Peak position
Japanese Albums (Oricon)	12
South Korean Albums (Circle)	5
