= Niigata TERRSA =

Niigata Workers Comprehensive Welfare Center
- 新潟勤労者総合福祉センター
- Niigata TERRSA (新潟テルサ)
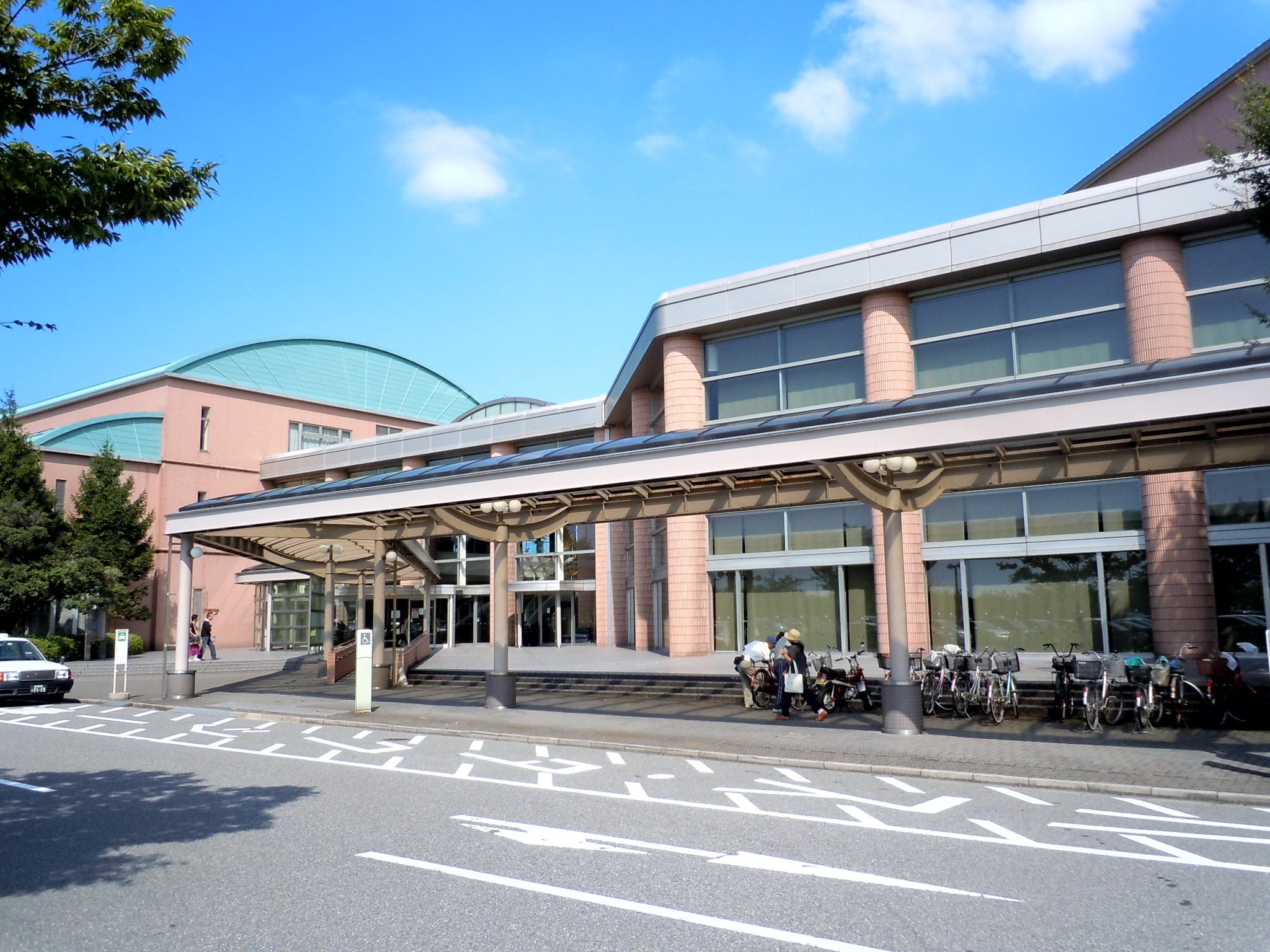
- Interactive map of Niigata Workers Comprehensive Welfare Center
- Address: 185-18 Shumoku, Chuo Ward, Niigata, 950-1141, Japan
- Coordinates: 37°52′37.9″N 139°2′49.8″E
- Capacity: 1,510

Construction
- Opened: 11 July 1994

Website
- www.n-terrsa.jp

Niigata TERRSA (新潟テルサ), officially the Niigata Workers Comprehensive Welfare Center (新潟勤労者総合福祉センター), is a 1,510-seat multi-purpose hall located in Niigata, Japan. It opened in 1994 and has hosted artists such as Whitesnake, Yngwie Malmsteen and Helloween.
