= NCT JNJM =

South Korean musical duo

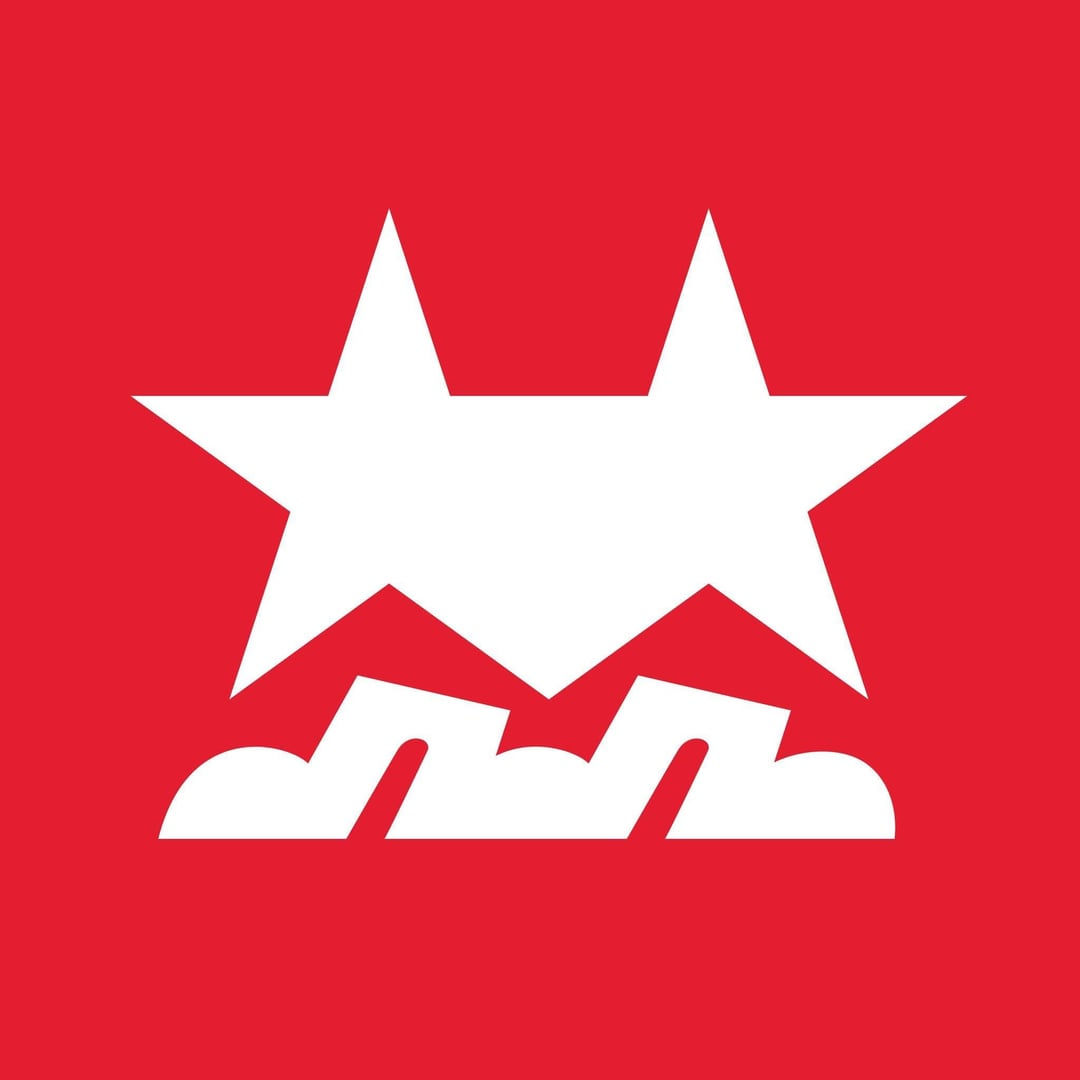
- Official logo

Background information
- Origin: Seoul, South Korea
- Genres: K-pop; hip-hop; R&B
- Years active: 2026–present
- Label: SM
- Spinoff of: NCT
- Members: Jeno; Jaemin

NCT JNJM (Korean: 엔시티 제노재민; RR: Ensiti JenoJaemin) is a sub-unit of the South Korean boy band NCT, formed by SM Entertainment. The duo consists of members Jeno and Jaemin. They debuted on February 23, 2026, with the extended play (EP) Both Sides.

== History ==
NCT JNJM was formed after they were cast in the baseball-themed short-form drama Wind Up in 2025 and was released on January 16, 2026. In January 2026, SM Entertainment announced that Jeno and Jaemin would debut in another NCT unit, NCT JNJM, on February 23, with the first EP Both Sides and the lead single of the same name.

In April 2026, SM announced that NCT JNJM would embark on their first fan meeting tour, titled Duality, visiting six cities across Asia from June to August. Presale tickets for the opening Seoul dates became available on April 14, while general public sales opened the following day, with all dates quickly selling out. At the shows, they performed all six songs from Both Sides and engaged with fans through games and skits.

== Artistry ==
The musical identity of NCT JNJM is centered on the concept of duality, exploring the contrasting performance styles of its two members. SM Entertainment described the unit's direction as a balance between Jeno's "powerful performance and commanding presence" and Jaemin's "sophisticated attitude and relaxed charm".

== Discography ==
=== Extended plays ===
List of extended plays, with selected details, chart positions, sales figures, and certifications
Title	Details	Peak chart positions			Sales	Certifications
Title	Details	KOR	JPN	JPN Hot	Sales	Certifications
Both Sides	Released: February 23, 2026; Label: SM, Kakao; Formats: CD, digital download, streaming	3	2	22	KOR: 525,182; JPN: 26,699	KMCA: Platinum

=== Singles ===
List of singles, with year of release, selected chart positions, and associated album
Title	Year	Peak chart positions	Album
Title	Year	KOR	Album
"Both Sides"	2026	19	Both Sides

=== Other charted songs ===
List of other charted songs, with year of release, selected chart positions, and associated album
Title	Year	Peak chart positions	Album
Title	Year	KOR DL	Album
"I.D.O.L."	2026	52	Both Sides
"What It Is"	2026	60	Both Sides
"Hashtag"	2026	61	Both Sides
"Wind Up"	2026	62	Both Sides
"Sexier"	2026	64	Both Sides

== Live performances ==
=== Fan meetings ===
List of fan meetings, with dates, locations, and attendance
Title	Date	Venue	City	Country	Attendance	Ref.
Duality	June 13, 2026	Jamsil Indoor Stadium	Seoul	South Korea	—N/a	
Duality	June 14, 2026 (Note: Two shows were held that day, the first at 2:00 PM and the second at 7:00 PM.)	Jamsil Indoor Stadium	Seoul	South Korea	—N/a	
Duality	June 27, 2026	Tokyo Metropolitan Gymnasium	Tokyo	Japan	20,000	
Duality	June 28, 2026	Tokyo Metropolitan Gymnasium	Tokyo	Japan	20,000	
Duality	July 4, 2026	Tennis Indoor Senayan	Jakarta	Indonesia	—N/a	
Duality	July 5, 2026	Tennis Indoor Senayan	Jakarta	Indonesia	—N/a	
Duality	July 11, 2026	The Londoner Macao	Macau		—N/a	
Duality	July 12, 2026	The Londoner Macao	Macau		—N/a	
Duality	July 18, 2026	Kaohsiung Music Center	Kaohsiung	Taiwan	—N/a	
Duality	August 7, 2026	Impact Arena	Pak Kret (Note: Labeled as Bangkok in promotional material)	Thailand	27,000	
Duality	August 8, 2026	Impact Arena	Pak Kret	Thailand	27,000	
Duality	August 9, 2026	Impact Arena	Pak Kret	Thailand	27,000	
