= Our Birthday =

- Digital cover

Single album by Ourbirthday
- Released: August 19, 2026
- Length: 9:41
- Language: Korean
- Labels: Innit; Republic

Singles from Our Birthday
- 1. "Hungry (Side A)" Released: July 22, 2026; 2. "Squeezy" Released: August 19, 2026

Our Birthday is the debut single album by South Korean girl group Ourbirthday. It was released by Innit Entertainment on August 19, 2026, and contains four tracks, including the pre-release single "Hungry (Side A)" and the lead single "Squeezy".

== Background and release ==
On July 2, 2026, JYP Entertainment teased a new project titled Ourbirthday with the release of a logo motion video. On July 14, a fictional universe was unveiled through the first episode of the animated series Whip! Ourbirthday!, which its first three characters were previously introduced via moving posters. An introduction film titled Error 502: Bad Gateway and concept photos were released from July 15 to 17, which revealed the first three members — Cho Hye-jin, Baby, and Achiraya — of the debut project's new girl group confirmed to be named Ourbirthday. On the following day, the pre-debut single "Hungry (Side A)" was announced to be released on July 22. The performance video for "Hungry (Side A)", featuring the first three members, was released on July 22 alongside the release of the single.

On July 23 and 24, the second episode of Whip! Ourbirthday! was released along with moving posters of four additional characters. On July 25, another introduction film titled Net::Err_Connection_Aborted was released, before the release of concept photos over the following two days, which revealed the latter four members — Kuk Cho-rok, Shin Hye-won, U, and Kilala — of Ourbirthday. On July 29, a performance video was released for the track "Hungry (Side B)", featuring the latter four members.

On August 4, the introduction film [System] Connection Established was released, revealing the complete seven-member lineup for the first time, along with the promotion scheduler for the album. Individual and group concept photos for the album were released from August 6 to 8, as well as on August 10 and 11. A music video teaser for the lead single "Squeezy" was released on August 17. The single album was released alongside the music video for "Squeezy" on August 19, marking the group's debut.

== Track listing ==
Track listing for Our Birthday
No.	Title	Lyrics	Music	Arrangement	Length
1.	"Our Birthday"	Lee Hye-yoom (Jamfactory)	Hitbypitch; David Amber; Dyson	Hitbypitch	2:37
2.	"Squeezy"	Heon Seo; Cho Yoon-kyung; Lee Sung-min (Jamfactory)	Imlay; Heon Seo	Imlay	2:30
3.	"Hungry (Side A)"	Kang Eun-jung; Exy; Sohlhee	Jake K (Artiffect); Sean Fischer; Kyler Niko; Lucia Calcines	Jake K (Artiffect); Sean Fischer	2:17
4.	"Hungry (Side B)"	Kang Eun-jung; Exy; Sohlhee	Jake K (Artiffect); Sean Fischer; Kyler Niko; Lucia Calcines	Jake K (Artiffect); Sean Fischer	2:17
Total length:					9:41

== Charts ==
=== Weekly charts ===
Weekly chart performance for Our Birthday
Chart (2026)	Peak position
South Korean Albums (Circle)	6

=== Monthly charts ===
Monthly chart performance for Our Birthday
Chart (2026)	Peak position
South Korean Albums (Circle)	17

== Release history ==
Release history for Our Birthday
Region	Date	Format	Label
South Korea	August 19, 2026	CD	Innit; Republic
Various	August 19, 2026	Digital download; streaming	Innit; Republic
