= Hiipe Princess =

South Korean–Japanese girls music group

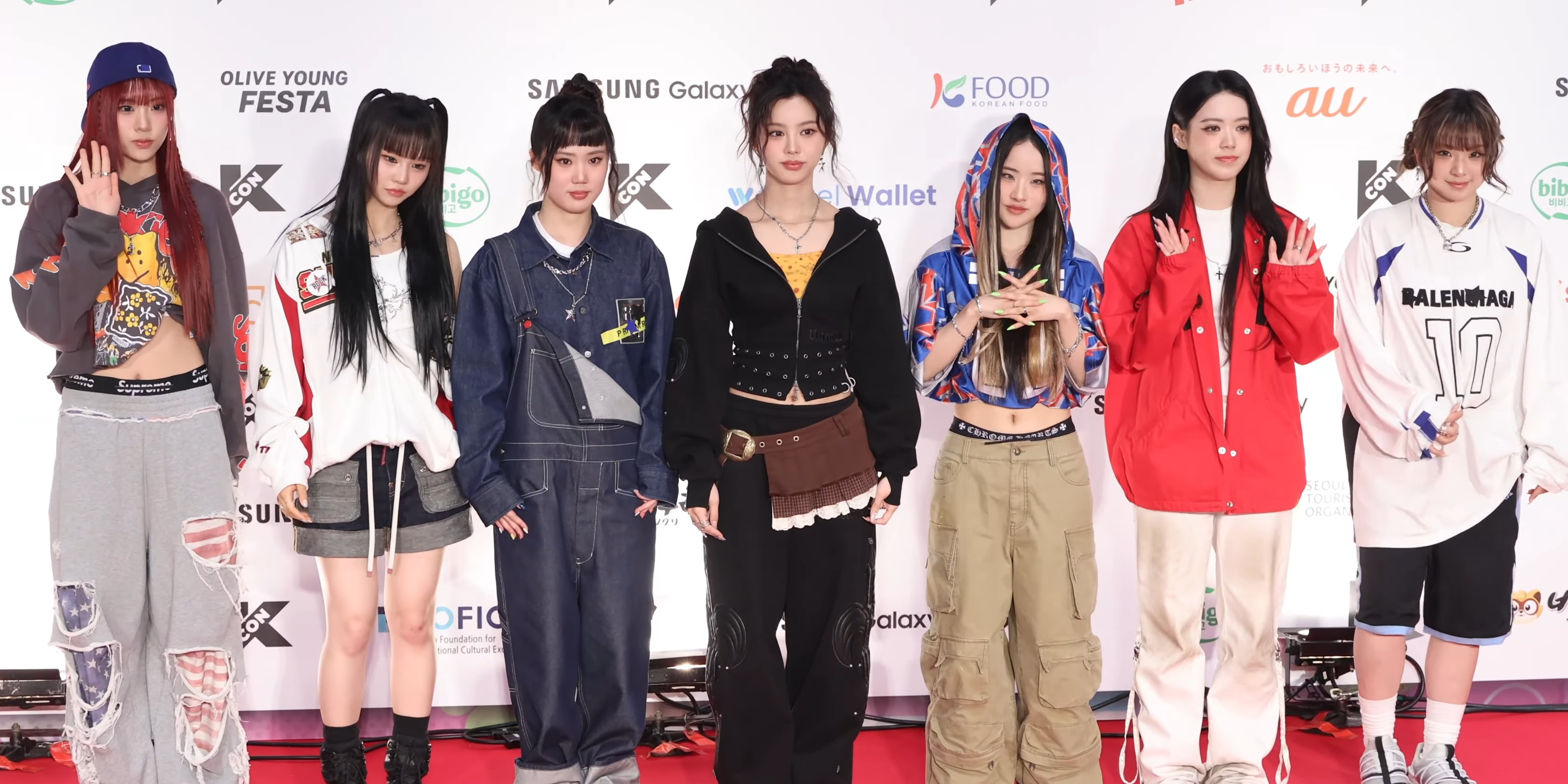
- Hiipe Princess in 2026; L–R: Sujin, Doi, Niko, Yuju, YSY, Coco, and Rino

Background information
- Also known as: H//pe Princess; H//pe P; Hiipe P
- Origin: Seoul, South Korea
- Genres: Hip-hop; K-pop
- Years active: 2026–present
- Labels: Chapter-I; Amoeba Culture; Warner
- Members: Yuju; Coco; Niko; YSY; Doi; Rino; Sujin

Hiipe Princess (Japanese: ハイププリンセス; Korean: 하입 프린세스; stylized as H//pe Princess in all caps) is a South Korean–Japanese girl group formed in 2026 by Chapter-I. The group consists of seven members: Yuju, Coco, Niko, YSY, Doi, Rino, and Sujin. As the first group signed to Chapter-I, a label co-founded by CJ ENM and Hakuhodo, managed by Amoeba Culture, and in partnership with Warner Music Group, Hiipe Princess was formed from participants in Unpretty Rapstar: Hip Pop Princess, the fourth instalment of the Unpretty Rapstar series. The group debuted on May 27, 2026 with their mini-album 17.7.

== Name ==
The group's name was chosen to reflect their ambition to establish their own musical identity and grow into a new role model through solidarity across genres and regional boundaries.

== History ==
=== 2025–2026: Unpretty Rapstar and formation ===
The group was formed from the CJ ENM rap competition show Unpretty Rapstar: Hip Hop Princess, the fourth installment of the Unpretty Rapstar series on Mnet. They are the first artists signed to Chapter-I, a label co-founded by CJ ENM and Hakuhodo, managed by Amoeba Culture, and in partnership with Warner Music Group globally. In December 2025, it was reported that Hiipe Princess would debut in the first half of 2026.

In April 2026, Hiipe Princess confirmed their official debut with their first mini-album 17.7, named after the members' average age at the time of the group's formation. The album was produced by Dynamic Duo, with member Gaeko contributing lyrics. On April 29, 2026, they released the debut single "Stolen" with an accompanying music video. On May 11, they released a Korean version of "Stolen" as part of their debut mini-album rollout and made their first appearance on M Countdown. During their pre-debut activities, they performed at the Rakuten Girls' Awards 2026 and appeared at various universities.

=== 2026–present: Debut with 17.7 ===
On May 27, 2026, Hiipe Princess debuted with their mini-album 17.7, which featured five tracks. Newsis described the group's sound as embracing cultures without prejudice, noting that they did not rely on their agency's identity but instead embraced an autonomous spirit similar to a "young creator crew" in establishing their own identity.

== Members ==
- Yuju (유주; ユジュ||)
- Coco (코코; ココ)
- Niko (니코; ニコ)
- YSY (ユン・ソヨン)
- Doi (도이; ドイ)
- Rino (리노; リノ)
- Sujin (수진; スジン)

== Discography ==
=== Albums ===
List of albums, showing selected details, peak chart positions and sales figures
Title	Details	Peak chart positions	Sales
Title	Details	JPN	Sales
17.7	Released: May 27, 2026; Labels: Chapter-I, Amoeba Culture, Warner; Formats: CD, digital download, streaming	23	JPN: 2,389

=== Singles ===
Title	Year	Album
"One Day"	2026	17.7
"Stolen"	2026	17.7
AWA	2026	Single
