= Unchild =

South Korean girl group

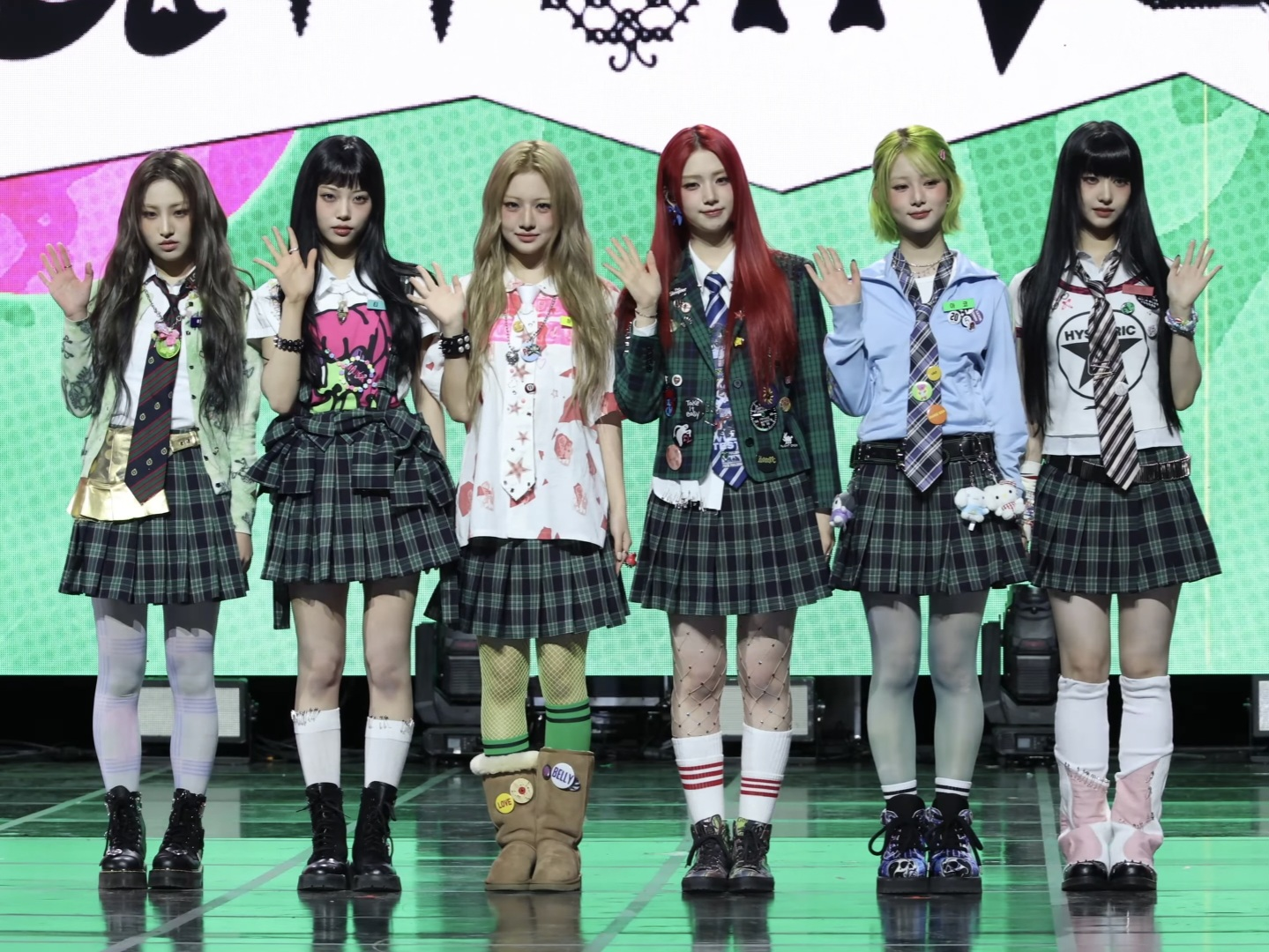
- Unchild in April 2026; L–R: Heekie, Tina, Haeun, Yeeun, Ako, and Evon

Background information
- Origin: Seoul, South Korea
- Genres: K-pop; hip-hop
- Years active: 2026–present
- Label: High Up
- Members: Yeeun; Heekie; Tina; Ako; Evon; Haeun

Unchild (Korean: 언차일드; stylized in all caps) is a South Korean multinational girl group formed by High Up Entertainment. The group consists of six members: Yeeun, Heekie, Tina, Ako, Evon, and Haeun. They debuted on April 21, 2026, with the single album We Are Unchild.

== Name ==
The name of the group Unchild is a portmanteau which combines the prefix "Un" which overturns the ordinary, and "child" which signifies a person who is not confined by any standards.

== History ==
=== 2024–2025: Pre-debut activities ===
OSEN reported that agency High Up Entertainment had continued with their global auditions for their second girl group on January 16, 2025. It also mentioned Park Yeeun, a former contestant on the survival show I-Land 2: N/a, being added to their roster as a trainee, with the possibility of her soon debuting with the group. Months later, Na Haeun announced her involvement with the agency on November 27, after she left SM Entertainment. Ilgan Sports later announced on December 3 that she will debut with upcoming South Korean girl group Unchild.

=== 2026–present: Debut and Heekie's hiatus ===
On April 1, High Up Entertainment opened all social media accounts for the girl group Unchild. On April 20, the fan name was announced as "Chacha" as well as the fan song "Chacha Song (Self-Produced by Unchild)". On April 21, they officially debuted with their debut single album We Are Unchild, releasing two new songs "Unchild" and "Energy" on the same day. Leader Heekie's hiatus was announced on June 12, 2026.

Unchild announced the digital single "TiNG TiNG", initially planned for release on September 2, but was postponed and released on November 5.

== Members ==
- Yeeun (예은)
- Heekie (히키) – leader
- Tina (티나; 季娜)
- Ako (아코; あこ)
- Evon (이본)
- Haeun (하은)

== Discography ==
=== Single albums ===
List of single albums, showing selected details, selected chart positions, and sales figures
Title	Details	Peak chart positions	Sales
Title	Details	KOR	Sales
We Are Unchild	Released: April 21, 2026; Label: High Up Entertainment; Formats: CD, digital download, streaming	—	
Ting Ting	Released: November 5, 2026; Label: High Up Entertainment; Formats: CD, digital download, streaming	TBA	

=== Singles ===
List of singles, showing year released, selected chart positions, and name of the album
Title	Year	Peak chart positions	Album
Title	Year	KOR DL	Album
"Unchild"	2026	40	We Are Unchild
"Energy"	2026	80	We Are Unchild
"Ting Ting"	2026	40	Ting Ting

== Videography ==
=== Music videos ===
Title	Year	Director(s)	Ref.
"Unchild"	2026	Renan	
"Ting Ting"	2026	Brthr	
