= Evan (singer) =

South Korean singer (born 2001)

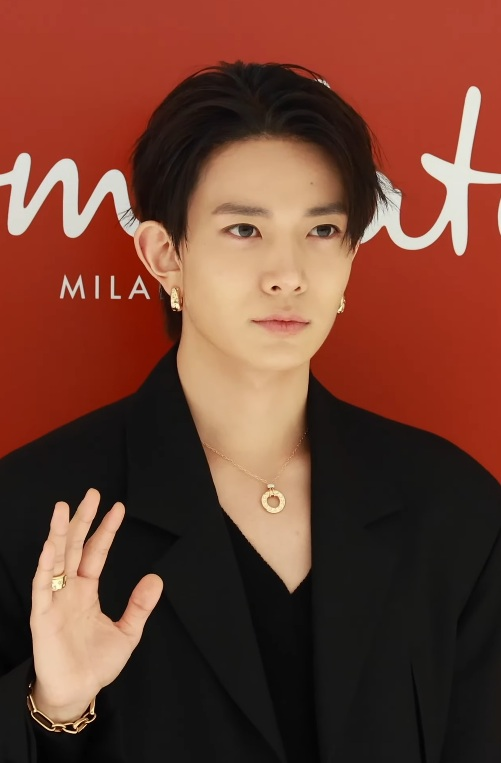
- Evan in 2024
- Born: Lee Hee-seung; October 15, 2001 (age 25); Uiwang, South Korea
- Other name: Heeseung
- Musical career
- Genres: K-pop; R&B; rock
- Instrument: Vocals
- Years active: 2020–present
- Label: Belift Lab
- Formerly of: Enhypen

Korean name
- Hangul: 이희승
- Hanja: 李羲承
- RR: I Huiseung
- MR: I Hŭisŭng

Lee Hee-seung (Korean: 이희승; born October 15, 2001), known professionally as Evan (Korean: 에반) and formerly known mononymously as Heeseung, is a South Korean singer and songwriter. He is a former member of the South Korean boy band Enhypen, formed through the 2020 reality competition show I-Land.

== Early life and education ==
Lee Hee-seung was born on October 15, 2001 in Uiwang, a lakeside city in Gyeonggi, South Korea. He was raised in Namyangju (also in Gyeonggi) and has an older brother. When he was younger, his hobbies included soccer and illustration. As a child, he acquired the English name Evan from spending time overseas. He would later use this as his professional name in 2026, describing the name Evan as reflective of his "most honest and natural self".

When he was in fourth grade, Evan was diagnosed with lymphoma, a form of blood cancer. Speaking to Weverse Magazine, he said that he saw a number of his friends, who were also ill, die when he was in the hospital for lymphoma. In 2017, he joined Big Hit Entertainment as a trainee after being scouted from an entrance exam at Hanlim Arts School. He completed his high school education at Gwangnam High School in Seoul and studied at Global Cyber University.

== Career ==
=== 2020–2025: Enhypen and solo career ===
In 2020, Evan competed in the survival reality competition show I-Land in 2020 under his birth name Heeseung, finishing in fifth place and earning a spot in the debut lineup of Enhypen. On November 30, 2020, he debuted as a member of Enhypen with the release of their first extended play (EP) Border: Day One under Belift Lab.

On May 30, 2022, Evan released a cover of "Off My Face" by Justin Bieber, receiving positive reviews from critics. Larisha Paul of Rolling Stone described the cover as "wedding-ready", while Billboard's Starr Bowenbank called Evan's vocal runs "subtle". Gladys Yeo of NME praised the rendition as "beautiful". On June 7, Evan appeared in an episode of LeeMujin Service, performing a set of song covers. Among others, he sang a solo rendition of "Tamed-Dashed" by Enhypen. On November 28, the song "Zero Moment", performed by himself and his then bandmates Jay and Jake, was released as a part of the soundtrack for the South Korean drama Summer Strike.

In 2024, Evan produced and co-wrote a track from Enhypen's 2024 album Romance: Untold, "Highway 1009", which has been described as a heartfelt acoustic song. In January 2025, Evan was featured in the Flo Rida single "Confessions", alongside Enhypen bandmate Jake and American rapper Paul Russell.

=== 2026–present: Departure from Enhypen and solo debut ===
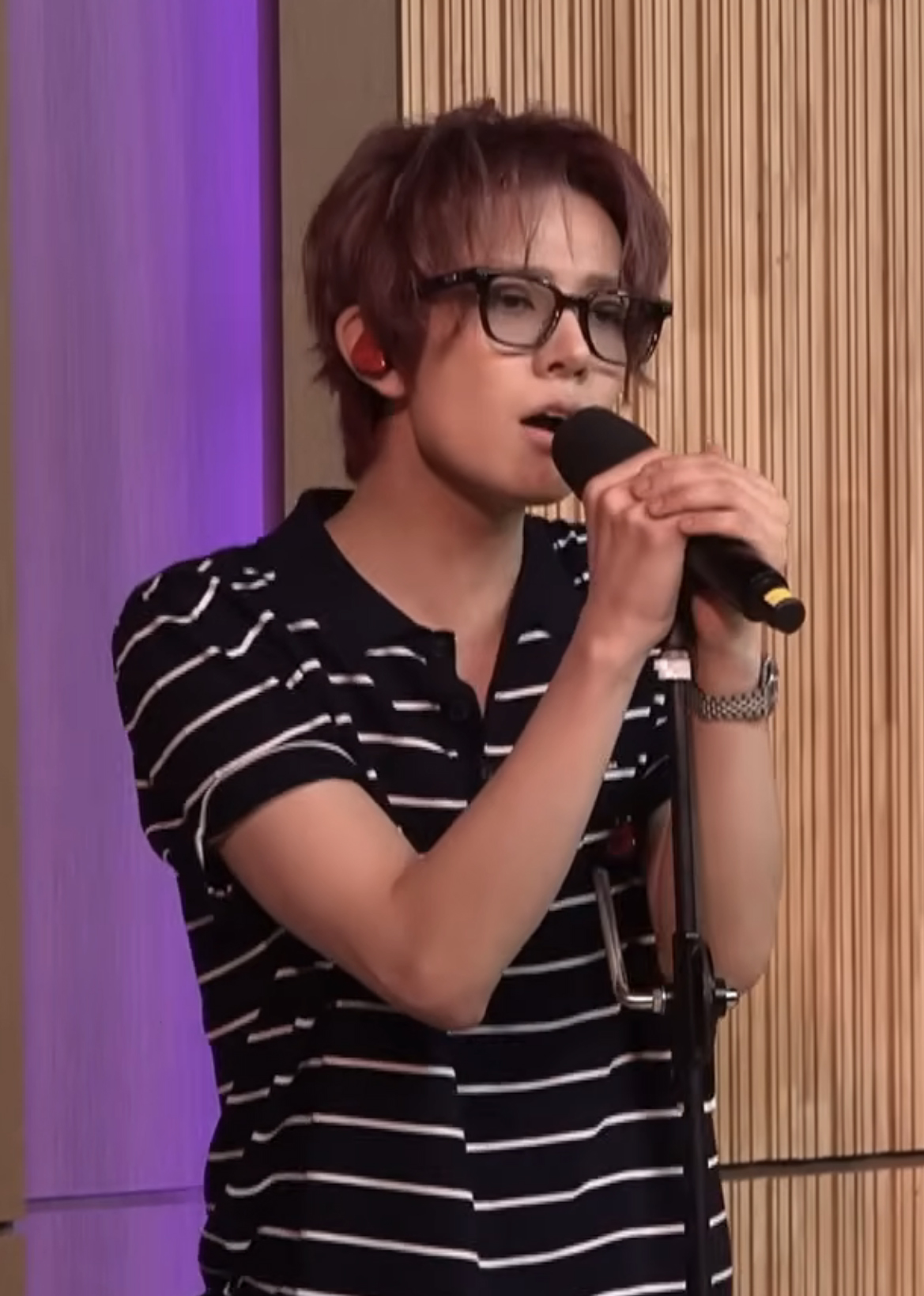
Evan performing in 2026

In 2026, Evan was credited for co-writing the Enhypen track "Sleep Tight", which was released in January as part of the band's extended play The Sin: Vanish.

On March 10, Belift Lab announced that Evan would be leaving Enhypen to pursue a solo career while remaining with the label. Fans created a Change.org petition urging the company to reverse his departure from the band. As of March 12, it accumulated more than 1 million signatures. In a statement to The Korea Herald on March 15, Belift asserted that Evan would not rejoin Enhypen.

On April 8, Belift announced that Evan would change his stage name from his birth name "Heeseung" to "Evan", a name he has used since childhood. The same day, he opened an official Instagram account. On May 11, Belift confirmed that he was preparing to debut in June 2026. Evan made his solo debut on June 22 with the digital single "Ride or Die". It was accompanied by the B-side track "Overflow". "Ride or Die" has been described as an alternative rock song with grunge and punk influences, while "Overflow" is a laid-back indie pop track. He also appeared on LeeMujin Service, performing his solo debut tracks as well as covers of songs like "Save Your Tears" by The Weeknd.

On August 9, Belift Lab announced that Evan's debut EP, Death of Me, would be released on September 7, with pre-orders opening the following day. On August 14 he performed at the Grammy Museum in Los Angeles. He then performed on Day 3 of KCON LA at Crypto.com Arena performing his songs "Overflow" and "Ride or Die" as well as a cover of "As It Was" by Harry Styles, his first big overseas stage as a solo artist. On its first day of release, Death of Me reportedly sold more than 460,000 copies. The record has been described as containing pop, R&B, alternative rock, UK garage, indie pop, and dream pop tracks.

On November 14, Evan released the country pop song "Black & Blue" as part of the soundtrack for the South Korean drama Happy Anding.

== Public image ==
According to Tatler Asia's Angela Nicole Guiral, Evan possesses a distinctive fashion sense and "star quality". In January 2026, he won in the fan-voted UPick Global Choice category at the D Awards, reportedly receiving more than 1 billion votes.

== Other ventures ==
=== Endorsements ===
In February 2025, Evan and his then Enhypen bandmate Jay appeared on the cover of W Korea in collaboration with Pomellato. In November 2025, Evan was announced as an ambassador for South Korean contact lens brand Qrsessed.

== Discography ==
=== Extended plays ===
List of extended plays, showing select details
Title	Details	Peak chart positions					Sales
Title	Details	KOR	JPN	JPN Hot	US	US World	Sales
Death of Me	Released: September 7, 2026; Label: Belift Lab; Formats: CD, digital download, streaming	2	6	15	49	2	KOR: 456,636; JPN: 23,901

=== Singles ===
List of singles, showing year released, selected chart positions, and name of the album
Title	Year	Peak chart positions	Album
Title	Year	KOR	Album
"Dial Tragedy"	2025	—	Non-album single
"Ride or Die"	2026	49	Death of Me
"Death of Me"	2026	95	Death of Me
"—" denotes releases that did not chart.

=== Soundtrack appearances ===
Title	Year	Album
"Zero Moment" (Note: Credited as Enhypen, but only with the participation of Heeseung, Jay and Jake.) (with Jay and Jake)	2022	Summer Strike OST
"Black & Blue"	2026	Happy Anding OST

=== Composition credits ===
All song credits are adapted from the Korea Music Copyright Association's database, unless otherwise noted.

Title	Year	Artist	Album	Lyricist	Composer	Producer
"Highway 1009"	2024	Enhypen	Romance: Untold	Yes	Yes	Yes
"Highway 1009 (Narr Ver.)"	2024	Enhypen	Romance: Untold	Yes	Yes	Yes
"Dial Tragedy"	2025	Evan	Non-album single	Yes	Yes	No
"Sleep Tight"	2026	Enhypen	The Sin: Vanish	Yes	Yes	No
"Voice Note (Heeseung Ver.)"	2026	Enhypen	The Sin: Vanish	Yes	Yes	No
"Not Enough"	2026	Evan	Death of Me	Yes	Yes	Yes
"Noise"	2026	Evan	Death of Me	Yes	Yes	No
"Ride or Die"	2026	Evan	Death of Me	Yes	Yes	Yes
"Death of Me"	2026	Evan	Death of Me	Yes	Yes	No
"Twilight"	2026	Evan	Death of Me	Yes	Yes	No
"Immature"	2026	Evan	Death of Me	Yes	Yes	Yes
"Overflow"	2026	Evan	Death of Me	Yes	Yes	Yes
"Going Home"	2026	Evan	Death of Me	Yes	Yes	Yes

== Videography ==
=== Music videos ===
Title	Year	Director(s)	Ref.
"Ride or Die"	2026	Park Dongjin	
"Death of Me"	2026	Oh Ximin (NoisyRoom)	

=== Other videos ===
Title	Year	Director(s)	Ref.
"Death of Me (Performance Video)"	2026	Oh Ximin (NoisyRoom)	
"Twilight (Performance Video)"	2026	Lee Junyeop	

== Filmography ==
=== Television shows ===
Year	Title	Role	Notes	Ref.
2020	I-Land	Contestant	Finished in fifth place	
2022; 2026	LeeMujin Service	Himself		
2024	Make Mate 1	Special Judge		

== Awards and nominations ==
Name of the award ceremony, year presented, award category, nominee(s) of the award, and the result of the nomination
Award ceremony	Year	Category	Nominee(s) / Work(s)	Result	Ref.
D Awards	2026	UPick Global Choice (Male)	Heeseung	Won	
K-World Dream Awards	2026	Best All-Rounder Musician Award	Evan	Won	
TMElive International Music Award	2026	TIMA Global K-Artist Award	Evan	Won	
