= Ourbirthday =

South Korean girl group

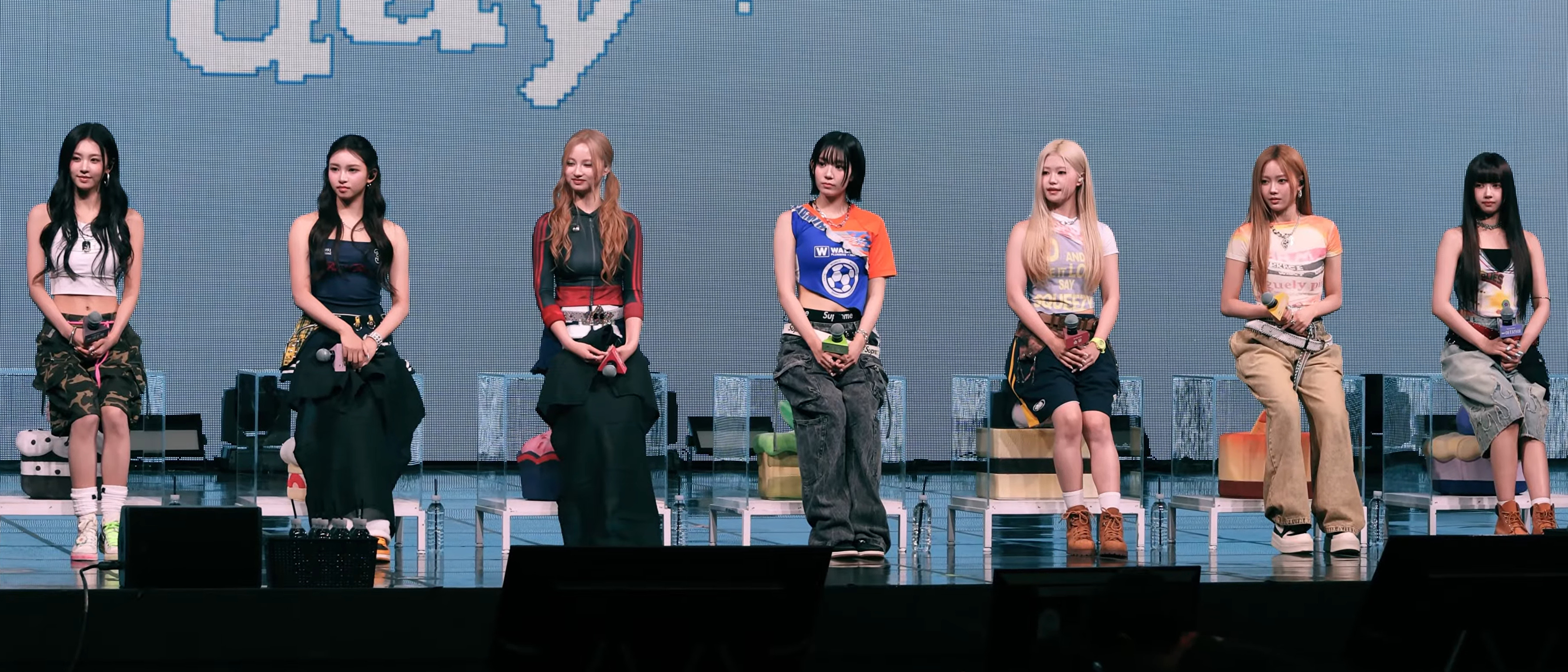
- Ourbirthday in 2026; From L–R: Kuk Cho-rok, Kilala, Baby, Cho Hye-jin, U, Shin Hye-won, Achiraya

Background information
- Also known as: OBD
- Origin: Seoul, South Korea
- Genre: K-pop
- Years active: 2026–present
- Label: Innit
- Members: Kuk Cho-rok; Shin Hye-won; Cho Hye-jin; U; Baby; Achiraya; Kilala

Ourbirthday (Korean: 아워벌스데이, stylized in all caps) is a South Korean girl group under Innit Entertainment, a subsidiary of JYP Entertainment. The group is composed of seven members: Kuk Cho-rok, Shin Hye-won, Cho Hye-jin, U, Baby, Achiraya, and Kilala. Ourbirthday debuted on August 19, 2026, with the single album Our Birthday.

== Name ==
The group's name is a reference to make "ordinary days feel as special as birthdays".

== History ==
=== 2026–present: Introduction and debut ===
Ourbirthday is the first girl group to debut from JYP Entertainment since Nmixx's debut back in 2022, and operates under the company's sub-label, Innit Entertainment.

On July 2, 2026, the group's debut project began with the release of a logo motion video by JYP Entertainment. The members were announced through a two-part reveal. The first three members — Cho Hye-jin, Baby, and Achiraya — were unveiled through an introduction film and concept photos released from July 15 to 17. The group's pre-debut single "Hungry (Side A)" was released on July 22, alongside a performance video featuring the three members. The latter four members — Kuk Cho-rok, Shin Hye-won, U, and Kilala — were revealed through another introduction film and concept photos released from July 25 to 27. The full seven-member lineup debuted on August 19 with the single album Our Birthday, released alongside the lead single "Squeezy".

== Members ==
- Kuk Cho-rok (국초록)
- Shin Hye-won (신혜원)
- Cho Hye-jin (조혜진)
- U (유)
- Baby (베이비)
- Achiraya (아치라야)
- Kilala (키라라)

== Discography ==
=== Single albums ===
List of single albums, showing selected details, selected chart positions, and sales figures
Title	Details	Peak chart positions	Sales
Title	Details	KOR	Sales
Our Birthday	Released: August 19, 2026; Label: Innit, Republic; Formats: CD, digital download, streaming	6	KOR: 123,985

=== Singles ===
List of singles, showing year released, selected chart positions, and name of the album
Title	Year	Peak chart positions	Album
Title	Year	KOR Down.	Album
"Hungry (Side A)"	2026	84	Our Birthday
"Squeezy"	2026	37	Our Birthday

== Videography ==
=== Music videos ===
List of music videos, showing year released, and name of the director(s)
Title	Year	Director(s)	Ref.
"Squeezy"	2026	Jihoon Shin	
