= Riizing Loud =

2025–2026 concert tour by Riize

Riize Concert Tour [Riizing Loud]
- Tour by Riize
- Promotional poster of the tour in Seoul, South Korea
- Location: Asia; North America
- Associated album: Odyssey
- Start date: July 4, 2025
- End date: March 8, 2026
- Legs: 1
- No. of shows: 37

Riize concert chronology
- Riizing Day (2024); Riizing Loud (2025–2026)

Riizing Loud (stylized as RIIZE CONCERT TOUR [RIIZING LOUD]) is the second concert tour by South Korean boy group Riize, in support of their first studio album, Odyssey (2025). The tour commenced on July 4, 2025 in Seoul and is set to conclude on February 23, 2026 in Tokyo. The tour consists of 35 concerts across ten countries in Asia. It will be their second concert tour since Riizing Day in 2024.

== Background ==
On April 28, 2025, SM Entertainment announced that Riize would be releasing their first studio album titled Odyssey in May 2025. Later on May 1, SM Entertainment announced that they would hold their second tour, titled "Riizing Loud". The tour kicked off with three consecutive shows at the KSPO Dome in South Korea from July 4 to July 7.

== Set list ==
=== Main set ===
1. "Ember to Solar"
2. "Siren"
3. "Odyssey"
4. "Combo"
5. "Memories"
6. "Be My Next"
7. "Lucky"
8. "Passage"
9. "Midnight Mirage"
10. "Hug" (TVXQ cover)
11. "Love 119"
12. "9 Days"
13. "Show Me Love"
14. "Honestly"
15. "Talk Saxy"
16. "Impossible"
17. "Monster" (Exo cover)
18. "Bag Bad Back"
19. "Get a Guitar"
20. "Boom Boom Bass"
21. "Fly Up"
22. "Another Life"

=== Encore ===
1. "The End of the Day"
2. "One Kiss"
3. "Inside My Love"

== Tour dates ==
List of 2025 concerts, showing date, city, country, venue, and attendance
Date (2025)	City	Country	Venue	Attendance
July 4	Seoul	South Korea	KSPO Dome	31,000
July 5	Seoul	South Korea	KSPO Dome	31,000
July 6	Seoul	South Korea	KSPO Dome	31,000
July 12	Kobe	Japan	Glion Arena Kobe	17,000
July 13	Kobe	Japan	Glion Arena Kobe	17,000
July 19	Hong Kong	China	AsiaWorld–Arena	20,000
July 20	Hong Kong	China	AsiaWorld–Arena	20,000
July 23	Saitama	Japan	Saitama Super Arena	54,000
July 24	Saitama	Japan	Saitama Super Arena	54,000
July 30	Hiroshima	Japan	Hiroshima Green Arena	—
July 31	Hiroshima	Japan	Hiroshima Green Arena	—
August 16	Kuala Lumpur	Malaysia	Idea Live Arena	—
August 23	Fukuoka	Japan	Marine Messe Fukuoka, Hall A	—
August 24	Fukuoka	Japan	Marine Messe Fukuoka, Hall A	—
August 30	Taipei	Taiwan	NTSU Arena	—
September 13	Tokyo	Japan	Yoyogi National Gymnasium	—
September 14	Tokyo	Japan	Yoyogi National Gymnasium	—
September 15	Tokyo	Japan	Yoyogi National Gymnasium	—
September 20	Bangkok	Thailand	Impact Arena	—
September 21	Bangkok	Thailand	Impact Arena	—
October 30	Rosemont	United States	Rosemont Theatre	—
November 1	New York City	United States	The Theater at Madison Square Garden	—
November 2	Washington, D.C.	United States	The Anthem	—
November 7	Seattle	United States	WaMu Theater	—
November 9	San Francisco	United States	Bill Graham Civic Auditorium	—
November 11	Los Angeles	United States	Peacock Theater	—
November 14	Mexico City	Mexico	Agustín Melgar Olympic Velodrome	—

List of 2026 concerts, showing date, city, country, venue, and attendance
Date (2026)	City	Country	Venue	Attendance
January 10	Jakarta	Indonesia	Indonesia Convention Exhibition, Hall 5-6	—
January 17	Manila	Philippines	SM Mall of Asia Arena	—
January 24	Singapore		Singapore Indoor Stadium	—
February 7	Macau	China	Galaxy Arena	—
February 21	Tokyo	Japan	Tokyo Dome	est. 120,000
February 22	Tokyo	Japan	Tokyo Dome	est. 120,000
February 23	Tokyo	Japan	Tokyo Dome	est. 120,000
March 6	Seoul	South Korea	KSPO Dome	—
March 7	Seoul	South Korea	KSPO Dome	—
March 8	Seoul	South Korea	KSPO Dome	—
Total				420,000

=== Cancelled shows ===
List of cancelled concerts, showing date, city, country, venue and reason for cancellation
Date	City	Country	Venue	Reason
November 4, 2025	Duluth	United States	Gas South Arena	Low ticket sales
