= SM Town Live 2025: The Culture, the Future =

2025 concert tour by SM Town

- Tour by SM Town
- Promotional poster
- Location: Asia; Europe; North America
- Associated album: 2025 SM Town: The Culture, the Future
- Start date: January 11, 2025
- End date: February 14, 2026
- No. of shows: 10

SM Town concert chronology
- SM Town Live 2023: SMCU Palace (2023–2024); SM Town Live 2025: The Culture, the Future (2025–2026)

SM Town Live 2025: The Culture, the Future (titled SM Town Live 2025–2026: The Culture, the Future for the shows held in 2026) was a concert tour by SM Town. The tour began on January 11, 2025, with two shows in Seoul, South Korea, and concluded on February 14, 2026, in Bangkok, Thailand. The tour commemorates the label's 30th anniversary.

== Background ==
In November 2024, SM Entertainment announced their then-upcoming anniversary concert, which took place on January 11 and 12, 2025, at the Gocheok Sky Dome. In December 2024, the international concert dates for London, Los Angeles, Mexico City, and Tokyo were announced.

On November 15, 2024, SM Entertainment announced the lineup of performers for the Seoul shows. The performers include Kangta, BoA, TVXQ!, Super Junior, Taeyeon and Hyo of Girls' Generation, Key and Minho of Shinee, Suho and Chanyeol of Exo, Red Velvet, NCT, Aespa, and Riize. On December 12, 2024, Taeyeon was announced to have exited the lineup due to creative differences with SM Entertainment. On January 6, 2025, Wendy of Red Velvet also exited the concerts due to personal reasons.

During the first show in Tokyo on August 9, 2025, additional dates for the Fukuoka shows were announced.

== Performers ==
This line-up of performers was taken from the show in Seoul, South Korea on January 11, 2025. It does not represent all shows throughout the tour.

- Kangta
- BoA
- TVXQ!
- Super Junior
- Hyo
- Shinee (Key and Minho)
- Exo (Suho and Chanyeol)
- Red Velvet
- NCT
- Aespa
- Riize
- Naevis
- SMTR25
- Min Ji-won
- ScreaM Records (Hyo, Raiden, and Mar Vista)
- SM Jazz Trio
- dearALICE
- Mytro

=== Notes ===
- Kangta and BoA only participated in the shows held in Seoul and Tokyo.
  - However, BoA cancelled in the Tokyo show due to knee surgery.
- Super Junior and Key did not participate in the show held in London.
- Hyo did not participate in the Mexico City and Los Angeles shows.
- Zhou Mi and XngHan & Xoul only participated in the Tokyo shows.
- Exo member Kai and Hearts2Hearts joined the tour starting from the Mexico City show.
- Red Velvet member Wendy did not participated in all tour dates, while Yeri only participated in the Seoul shows.
- NCT Wish was pulled from the Los Angeles show due to visa issues.
- Min Ji-won, ScreaM Records, SM Jazz Trio, and Mytro only participated in Seoul shows.
- dearALICE did not participate in Tokyo shows.
- 25 members of SMTR25 participated in Seoul shows.
  - However, only 11 of them participated in Mexico City, Los Angeles, and London, including Hanbi, Songha, Nicholas, Daniel, Kassho, Justin, Hyunjun, Haruta, Hamin, Kachin, and Tata.

== Set lists ==
Seoul, South Korea (January 11–12, 2025)

Pre-show

Performer(s)	Song(s)
Mytro	"Love Hate" "Bomb Bomb Bomb"
Mar Vista	DJ set
Raiden	DJ set
Hyo	DJ set
SM Jazz Trio	Jazz set
Min Ji-won	"Sentimental Love"

Main show

Performer(s)	Song(s)
TVXQ!	"Rising Sun"
SMTR25	"Lucifer" "A Man in Love" "Growl"
BoA	"Hurricane Venus" "Only One" (with Sion)
Naevis	"Sensitive"
Aespa	"Whiplash" "Armageddon"
DearALICE	"Ariana"
Riize	"Impossible" "Boom Boom Bass"
Exo	"The First Snow"
Suho	"1 to 3"
Chanyeol	"Hasta la Vista"
Hyo	"Dessert" (with Giselle and Yangyang)
Key	"Villain" (with Jeno)
Seulgi	"Bad Boy, Sad Girl" (with Sungchan)
Minho	"Because of You" (with Ningning)
NCT Wish	"Wish" "Steady"
NCT Dream	"When I'm with You" "Smoothie"
WayV	"Give Me That" "Frequency"
NCT 127	"Walk" "Fact Check"
Super Junior-M	"At Least I Still Have You"
Minho	"Something About U"
Key	"Gasoline"
Kangta	"Polaris" (with SM Jazz Trio and Jaehee)
TVXQ! Super Junior	"Show Me Your Love" (with Suho, Chanyeol, Johnny, Jungwoo, Chenle, Kun, Ten, Eunseok, Ryo, and Sakuya)
Hyo	"Retro Romance"
Bada	"Just in Love" "Dreams Come True" (with Karina and Winter) "Cosmic" (with Ryeowook)
Tony An Kangta	"Candy" (with NCT Dream) "Full of Happiness" (with Xiaojun, Hendery, Wonbin, Anton, Sion, and Yushi)
Red Velvet	"Cosmic" "Red Flavor"
Super Junior	"Sorry, Sorry" "Devil"
TVXQ!	"Rebel" "Keep Your Head Down"
WayV	"Julliete"
aespa	"Rum Pum Pum Pum"
Riize	"Hug"
Red Velvet	"Run Devil Run"
NCT Dream	"Love Me Right"
Kangta	"Just a Feeling
BoA	"End of a Day"
NCT Wish	"Miracle"
Super Junior	"I Pray 4 U"
NCT 127	"You in Vague Memory"
EXO	"Git It Up!"
TVXQ!	"Psycho"
SM Town	"Hope from Kwangya"

Alterations

- BoA performed with Shotaro instead of Sion during the January 12 show.
- Chanyeol performed "Back Again" instead of "Hasta la Vista" during the January 12 show.
- Hwanhee performed "Sea of Love" with Sohee after Minho's performance during the January 12 show.
Mexico City, Mexico (May 9, 2025)

Main show

Performer(s)	Song(s)
TVXQ!	"Rising Sun"
SMTR25	"Lucifer"
Super Junior	"Mamacita"
SMTR25	"Growl"
DearALICE	"Ariana"
Hearts2Hearts	"The Chase" "Butterflies"
Riize	"Impossible" "Boom Boom Bass"
Aespa	"Whiplash" "Next Level"
Red Velvet	"Bad Boy" "Run Devil Run"
NCT Wish	"Wish" "Steady"
NCT Dream	"When I'm with You" "Smoothie"
WayV	"Give Me That" "Love Talk"
NCT 127	"Walk" "Fact Check"
Suho	"1 to 3"
Chanyeol	"Hasta la Vista"
Kai	"Wait on Me"
Minho	"Call Back" "Something About U"
Key	"Pleasure Shop" "Gasoline"
Exo	"Git It Up!"
Super Junior	"Sorry, Sorry"
TVXQ!	"Psycho"
SMTR25	SM Entertainment 30th Anniversary Tribute Performance
NCT Wish	"Poppop"
Riize	"Get a Guitar"
Aespa	"Supernova"
NCT Dream	"Hot Sauce"
WayV	"Frequency"
Red Velvet	"Red Flavor"
NCT 127	"Kick It"
Super Junior	"Black Suit"
TVXQ!	"Mirotic"
SM Town	"Hope from Kwangya"

Los Angeles, United States (May 11, 2025)

Main show

Performer(s)	Song(s)
TVXQ!	"Rising Sun"
SMTR25	"Lucifer"
Super Junior	"Mamacita"
SMTR25	"Growl"
DearALICE	"Ariana"
Hearts2Hearts	"The Chase" "Butterflies"
Riize	"Impossible" "Boom Boom Bass"
Aespa	"Whiplash" "Next Level"
Red Velvet	"Bad Boy" "Run Devil Run"
NCT Dream	"When I'm with You" "Smoothie"
WayV	"Give Me That" "Love Talk"
NCT 127	"Walk" "Fact Check"
Suho	"1 to 3"
Chanyeol	"Hasta la Vista"
Kai	"Wait on Me"
Minho	"Call Back" "Something About U"
Key	"Pleasure Shop" "Gasoline"
Exo	"Git It Up!"
Super Junior	"Sorry, Sorry"
TVXQ!	"Psycho"
SMTR25	SM Entertainment 30th Anniversary Tribute Performance
Riize	"Get a Guitar"
Aespa	"Supernova"
NCT Dream	"Hot Sauce"
WayV	"Frequency"
Red Velvet	"Red Flavor"
NCT 127	"Kick It"
Super Junior	"Black Suit"
TVXQ!	"Mirotic"
SM Town	"Hope from Kwangya"

London, United Kingdom (June 28, 2025)

Main show

Performer(s)	Song(s)
TVXQ!	"Rising Sun"
SMTR25	"Lucifer" "Growl"
Hearts2Hearts	"The Chase" "Butterflies"
DearALICE	"Ariana" "Save Us"
Riize	"Boom Boom Bass" "Ember to Solar"
Aespa	"Whiplash" "Next Level"
Red Velvet	"Bad Boy" "Run Devil Run"
Hyo	"Retro Romance"
NCT Wish	"Wish" "Steady"
NCT Dream	"When I'm with You" "Smoothie"
WayV	"Give Me That" "Frequency"
NCT 127	"Walk" "Fact Check"
Suho	"1 to 3"
Chanyeol	"Hasta la Vista"
Kai	"Wait on Me"
Minho	"Call Back" "Something About U"
Hyo	"Dessert" (with Giselle and Yangyang)
Exo	"Git It Up!"
TVXQ!	"Psycho"
SMTR25	SM Entertainment 30th Anniversary Tribute Performance
Hearts2Hearts	"Style"
NCT Wish	"Poppop"
Riize	"Fly Up"
Aespa	"Supernova"
NCT Dream	"Hot Sauce"
WayV	"Love Talk"
Red Velvet	"Red Flavor"
NCT 127	"Kick It"
TVXQ!	"Mirotic"
SM Town	"Hope from Kwangya"

Tokyo, Japan (August 9–10, 2025)

Main show

Performer(s)	Song(s)
TVXQ!	"Rising Sun"
SMTR25	"Lucifer" "Growl"
Hearts2Hearts	"The Chase" "Gee"
NCT Wish	"Wish" "Steady"
Riize	"Boom Boom Bass" "Bag Bad Back"
Aespa	"Whiplash" "Dirty Work"
XngHan & Xoul	"Heavenly Blue" "Waste No Time"
Seulgi	"Bad Boy, Sad Girl" (with Sungchan)
Super Junior-M	"At Least I Still Have You"
Kangta	"My Life"
Minho	"Call Back"
Key	"Gasoline"
Hyo	"Retro Romance"
NCT Dream	"Chiller" "Moonlight"
WayV	"Give Me That" "Love Talk"
NCT 127	"Walk" "Fact Check"
Suho	"1 to 3"
Chanyeol	"Kangaete Mitara"
Kai	"Wait on Me"
Hyo	"Dessert" (with Giselle and Yangyang)
Mark	"+82 Pressin'" (with Haechan)
Max Changmin Kyuhyun Shotaro	"Ai Scream!'"
Kangta	"Full of Happiness" (with Xiaojun, Hendery, Wonbin, Anton, Sion, and Yushi)
Key	"Hunter"
Minho	"Something About U"
Red Velvet	"Bad Boy" "Run Devil Run"
Exo	"Git It Up!"
Super Junior	"Sorry, Sorry" "Black Suit"
TVXQ!	"Psycho"
SMTR25	SM Entertainment 30th Anniversary Tribute Performance
Hearts2Hearts	"Style"
NCT Wish	"Poppop"
Riize	"Fly Up"
Aespa	"Supernova"
NCT Dream	"BTTF"
WayV	"Big Bands"
Red Velvet	"Red Flavor"
NCT 127	"2 Baddies"
Super Junior	"Express Mode"
TVXQ!	"Mirotic"
SM Town	"Hope from Kwangya"

== Tour dates ==
List of 2025 concerts, showing date, city, country, venue, and attendance
Date (2025)	City	Country	Venue	Attendance
January 11	Seoul	South Korea	Gocheok Sky Dome; Beyond Live	40,000
January 12	Seoul	South Korea	Gocheok Sky Dome; Beyond Live	40,000
May 9	Mexico City	Mexico	Estadio GNP Seguros	50,000
May 11	Los Angeles	United States	Dignity Health Sports Park	—
June 28	London	England	The O2 Arena (Note: The venue for this show was initially Allianz Stadium Twickenham.)	—
August 9	Tokyo	Japan	Tokyo Dome	95,000
August 10	Tokyo	Japan	Tokyo Dome	95,000

List of 2026 concerts, showing date, city, country, venue, and attendance
Date (2026)	City	Country	Venue	Attendance
January 31	Fukuoka	Japan	Mizuho PayPay Dome Fukuoka	70,000
February 1	Fukuoka	Japan	Mizuho PayPay Dome Fukuoka	70,000
February 14	Bangkok	Thailand	Rajamangala Stadium	—
Total				—
