= Boom Boom Bass =

- Orchestra version cover

Single by Riize

from the EP Riizing
- Language: Korean; English
- Released: June 17, 2024
- Studio: SM Dorii; SM Wavelet
- Genre: Dance-pop; Disco; Funk
- Length: 2:32
- Label: SM; Kakao; RCA
- Composers: Peter Wallevik; Daniel Davidsen; Ben Samama; David Arkwright
- Lyricists: Peter Wallevik; Daniel Davidsen; David Arkwright; Ben Samama; Kil Jeong-jin; ChaMane

Riize singles chronology
"Impossible" (2024)	"Boom Boom Bass" (2024)	"Lucky" (2024)

Music video
- "Boom Boom Bass" on YouTube

"Boom Boom Bass" is a song recorded by South Korean boy band Riize. It was released on June 17, 2024, through SM Entertainment and distributed by Kakao Entertainment and RCA Records, as the fifth single and lead track of the group's EP Riizing. The song was commercially successful, charting in the upper half of charts in Korea and Japan, as well as being the group's first appearance on a chart in the UK. "Boom Boom Bass" was released without the participation of member Seunghan, who was on hiatus from the group at the time of its release and departed the group in October 2024.

== Background and release ==
On March 5, 2024, SM Entertainment announced that Riize would embark on the Riizing Day tour in May, and that the group would be releasing a new single and EP in the second quarter of 2024. In April, the group released two singles: "Siren" on April 3, "Impossible" on April 18, and three additional b-sides from the Riizing EP on April 29. On May 20, SM confirmed the EP's release date, along with its track listing and the name of its lead single, "Boom Boom Bass". "Boom Boom Bass" was released simultaneously with the Riizing EP on June 17.

As part of the group's one-year anniversary celebrations, an orchestral arrangement of "Boom Boom Bass" was released on September 14. The song was performed by 60 members of the Seoul Philharmonic Orchestra, along with 40 additional bassists, and released as part of the orchestra's ongoing collaboration agreement with SM's SM Classics label.

== Composition ==
"Boom Boom Bass"
"Boom Boom Bass" features strong bass lines and disco beats.

"Boom Boom Bass" showcases a totally different side of us that fans haven't seen before: it’s disco but funk and still pop.

— Riize member Wonbin on the song's sound, Grammy.com

"Boom Boom Bass" was written and composed by Peter Wallevik, Daniel Davidsen, David Arkwright and Ben Samama, with Wallevik and Davidsen contributing to arrangement. Korean-language lyrics were contributed by Kil Jeong-jin and ChaMane.

The song's production consists of strong, "groovy" bass lines, "funky" disco beats, and dance rhythms. Lyrically, "Boom Boom Bass" is about "celebrating the power of music" and "connecting with others through sound. "Boom Boom Bass" was composed in the key of F minor, with a tempo of 117 beats per minute.

== Critical reception ==
Writing for Clash, Isabella Wandermurem gave a positive review of the song, saying the song had "contagious energy", was "captivating and addictive". She also noted that the band member's vocals "perfectly complement" the song's rhythmic vibe. In another review, Maddie Armstrong for &Asian wrote that the song delivered "criminally-good levels of funk", and that the song "celebrates all that makes us feel good."

== Music video ==
The music video for "Boom Boom Bass" was first previewed in a 46-second video entitled "Find That Bass" shared on the group's official YouTube channel on June 10. In the teaser, the group searches through various scenes to find "the legendary bass guitar" while a clip of the baseline from the song's instrumental plays. The video was further teased in another 24-second video clip on June 15.

Directed by Oui Kim, the music video for "Boom Boom Bass" was released onto SM Entertainment's official YouTube channel on June 17, simultaneously with the song and EP's release. In the music video, the group's members go in search of "the legendary bass guitar", while performing the song in a music store, a mansion, a street intersection, and on a rooftop.

== Live performances ==
Following the release of "Boom Boom Bass", Riize performed on six South Korean music programs: Mnet's M Countdown on June 20, 27, and July 4, KBS's Music Bank on June 21, 28, and July 5, MBC's Show! Music Core on June 22, July 6, and 17, SBS's Inkigayo on June 23, 30, and July 7, SBS M's The Show on June 25, and MBC Plus's Show Champion June 26.

To further promote the song, the group also performed on Mnet's Performance37. The song was also added to the setlist of the group's 2024 Riizing Day concert tour, beginning with the first show after the song's release, on July 17 in Quezon City, Philippines.

The band performed the song at the 2023 Melon Music Awards on November 30, 2024, including it in a medley performance with "Combo". The performance began with a bass guitar performance from Riize member Anton, pair choreography between Eunseok and Sungchan, and a dance break with Shotaro, Wonbin and Sohee.

== Accolades ==
On South Korean music programs, "Boom Boom Bass" received five wins, achieving a "grand-slam" for winning all of the shows being broadcast for the week ending June 25.

Music program awards for "Boom Boom Bass"
Program	Date	Ref.
The Show	June 25, 2024	
Show Champion	June 26, 2024	
M Countdown	June 27, 2024	
Music Bank	June 28, 2024	
Inkigayo	June 30, 2024	

== Credits and personnel ==
Credits adapted from the Riizing liner notes.

Studio

- SM Dorii Studio – recording
- SM Wavelet Studio – recording, digital editing
- Doobdoob Studio – digital editing
- SM Concert Hall Studio – mixing
- Sterling Sound – mastering

Personnel

- SM Entertainment – executive producer
- Jang Cheol-hyuk – executive supervisor
- Riize – vocals
- Peter Wallevik (PhD) – lyrics, composition, arrangement, piano, instrument programming
- Daniel Davidsen (PhD) – lyrics, composition, guitar
- Ben Samama – lyrics, composition, background vocals
- David Arkwright – lyrics, composition, background vocals
- Kil Jeong-jin – Korean lyrics
- ChaMane – Korean lyrics
- Junny – background vocals
- Henrik Linder – bass guitar
- G-High – vocal directing, Pro Tools
- Jeong Jae-won – recording
- Kang Eun-ji – recording, digital editing
- Kwon Yu-jin – recording
- Jin Nam-goong – mixing
- Chris Gehringer – mastering

== Charts ==
=== Weekly charts ===
Weekly chart performance
Chart (2024)	Peak position
Global Excl. US (Billboard)	87
Japan (Japan Hot 100)	41
Japan Combined Singles (Oricon)	40
South Korea (Billboard)	11
South Korea (Circle)	17
UK Singles Downloads (Official Charts)	76

=== Monthly charts ===
Monthly chart performance
Chart (2024)	Position
South Korea (Circle)	20

=== Year-end charts ===
Year-end chart performance
Chart	Year	Position
South Korea (Circle)	2024	79
South Korea (Circle)	2025	130

== Release history ==
Release history
Region	Date	Format	Version	Label
Various	June 17, 2024	Digital download; streaming	Original	SM; Kakao
Various	September 14, 2024	Digital download; streaming	Orchestra	SM Classics
