= Riizing Day =

2024 concert tour by Riize

- World tour by Riize
- Promotional poster for the Seoul concert
- Location: Asia; North America
- Associated albums: Riizing; Riizing: Epilogue
- Start date: May 4, 2024
- End date: September 15, 2024
- Legs: 3
- No. of shows: 31

Riize concert chronology
- Riizing Day (2024); Riizing Loud (2025–2026)

Riizing Day was the first concert tour by South Korean boy band Riize. The tour began on May 4, 2024, at Jamsil Indoor Stadium in Seoul, South Korea, and held 31 shows across 19 cities in Asia and North America. The tour concluded on September 15 with three encore shows at the KSPO Dome in Seoul promoted as "Riizing Day Finale", featuring a revamped setlist, staging and costumes. Riize member Seunghan, who was on hiatus from the group at the time, did not participate in the tour.

== Background and announcement ==
In February 2024, SM Entertainment confirmed to Dispatch that Riize was preparing for an upcoming tour that would start in Seoul on May 4. On March 5, SM officially announced the tour, indicating that the Seoul dates would be at the Jamsil Indoor Stadium and that the tour would visit cities across Asia and North America in the upcoming months. At the same time, it was also announced that the group would release a single and EP within the second quarter of the year. At the group's concert in Tokyo on May 11, the group announced that they would be adding an additional leg to the tour, returning to Japan for a 9-city, 15-show tour beginning in July.

After the group completed their first two dates in Seoul, SM announced that they would be returning to the city in September for a series of encore shows branded "Riizing Day Finale", with two dates at the KSPO Dome on September 14 and 15. After the first two dates sold out, an additional date was announced for September 13.

On July 31, SM announced that the group's September 13 concert in Seoul would be broadcast live in cinemas around the world entitled, Riize Fan-Con Tour 'Riizing Day' Finale in Cinemas.

In the days leading up to the start of the tour, Riize released several new songs that would be included in the concert's setlist: "Siren", "Impossible", "One Kiss", "Honestly", and "9 Days". These songs would later be included on the group's EP, Riizing.

== Ticketing ==
When tickets went on sale on March 13, both Seoul dates were sold out to members of the group's fan club, before being made available to the general public. In light of this, SM announced that the concert would be live streamed online via Beyond Live and Weverse for people who were unable to attend or get tickets to the show. The Tokyo dates were also sold out, where 500,000 applications were submitted. Additional restricted-view tickets were later released, totaling 24,000 seats. The remainder of the Japanese leg of the tour were also sold out.

The group's second round of shows in Seoul at the KSPO Dome sold out during the advance sales to the group's fan club. The live broadcast of the September 13 concert in cinemas were also sold out in several locations, namely over 40 theatres in Japan.

== Setlist ==
Riizing Day
1. Siren
2. One Thing (One Direction cover)
3. White Christmas (Super Junior cover)
4. Love 119
5. Get a Guitar
6. Honestly
7. Talk Saxy
8. 9 Days
9. Impossible

Encore

10. One Kiss
11. Memories

=== Alterations ===
- At the Tokyo shows on May 11 and 12, the Japanese-language version of "Love 119" was performed.
- Starting from the May 11 show in Tokyo, "Happy! Happy! Happy!" was added to the setlist after "One Thing".
- Starting from the July 14 show in Quezon City, "Boom Boom Bass" was added to the setlist after "Impossible".
Riizing Day Japan Hall Tour
1. Siren
2. Same Key
3. Love 119 (Japanese version)
4. Be My Next
5. Honestly
6. Talk Saxy
7. Get a Guitar
8. 9 Days
9. Impossible
10. Lucky
11. Boom Boom Bass

Encore

12. One Kiss
13. Memories
Riizing Day Finale in Seoul
1. Siren
2. Love 119
3. Get a Guitar
4. Honestly
5. Be My Next
6. Lucky
7. Memories
8. Combo
9. Rising Sun (TVXQ cover)
10. Talk Saxy
11. 9 Days
12. Impossible
13. Boom Boom Bass

Encore

14. Same Key
15. Happy! Happy! Happy!
16. One Kiss

== Tour dates ==
List of tour dates, showing location and attendance
Date	City	Country	Venue	Attendance	Ref.
May 4, 2024	Seoul	South Korea	Jamsil Indoor Stadium	—	
May 5, 2024	Seoul	South Korea	Jamsil Indoor Stadium	—	
May 11, 2024	Tokyo	Japan	Yoyogi National Gymnasium	24,000	
May 12, 2024	Tokyo	Japan	Yoyogi National Gymnasium	24,000	
May 15, 2024	Mexico City	Mexico	Teatro Metropólitan	—	
May 20, 2024	Los Angeles	United States	Peacock Theater	—	
June 1, 2024	Hong Kong		AsiaWorld–Expo	—	
June 15, 2024	Taipei	Taiwan	New Taipei City Exhibition Hall	—	
July 14, 2024	Quezon City (Note: Labeled as Manila in promotional material.)	Philippines	Smart Araneta Coliseum	—	
July 20, 2024	Singapore		Arena @ Expo	—	
July 27, 2024	Pak Kret (Note: Labeled as Bangkok in promotional material.)	Thailand	Thunder Dome	10,000	
July 28, 2024	Pak Kret	Thailand	Thunder Dome	10,000	
August 31, 2024	Tangerang (Note: Labeled as Jakarta in promotional material.)	Indonesia	Indonesia Convention Exhibition	—	
July 30, 2024	Yokohama (Note: Labeled as Kanagawa in promotional material.)	Japan	Pacifico Yokohama	—	
July 31, 2024	Yokohama	Japan	Pacifico Yokohama	—	
August 3, 2024	Osaka	Japan	Osaka International Convention Center	—	
August 4, 2024	Osaka	Japan	Osaka International Convention Center	—	
August 8, 2024	Sendai (Note: Labeled as Miyagi in promotional material.)	Japan	Sendai Sun Plaza	—	
August 9, 2024	Sendai	Japan	Sendai Sun Plaza	—	
August 11, 2024	Maebashi (Note: Labeled as Gunma in promotional material.)	Japan	Beisia Culture Hall	—	
August 13, 2024	Okayama	Japan	Kurashiki Civic Hall	—	
August 14, 2024	Hiroshima	Japan	Hiroshima Bunka Gakuen	—	
August 20, 2024	Kumamoto	Japan	Kumamoto-jo Hall	—	
August 21, 2024	Fukuoka	Japan	Fukuoka Sunpalace	—	
August 22, 2024	Fukuoka	Japan	Fukuoka Sunpalace	—	
August 25, 2024	Nagoya (Note: Labeled as Aichi in promotional material.)	Japan	Nagoya International Congress Center	—	
August 26, 2024	Nagoya	Japan	Nagoya International Congress Center	—	
August 27, 2024	Nagoya	Japan	Nagoya International Congress Center	—	
September 13, 2024	Seoul	South Korea	KSPO Dome	—	
September 14, 2024	Seoul	South Korea	KSPO Dome	—	
September 15, 2024	Seoul	South Korea	KSPO Dome	—	
