= Love 119 =

Single by Riize

from the EP Riizing
- Language: Korean; Japanese; English
- Released: January 5, 2024
- Studio: SM Yellow Tail; SM Droplet; Doobdoob
- Genre: Dance
- Length: 2:53
- Label: SM; Kakao; RCA
- Composers: Jason Hahs; Colin Magalong; David Wilson; MZMC
- Lyricists: Jason Hahs; Colin Magalong; David Wilson; MZMC; Jeong Da-seul (Note: Korean version only); ChaMane; Moon Seol-lee; Jo Yoon-kyung; Mahiro (Note: Japanese version only)

Riize singles chronology
"Talk Saxy" (2023)	"Love 119" (2024)	"Siren" (2024)

Alternative cover
- Japanese version cover

Riize Japanese singles chronology
"Love 119" (2024)	"Lucky" (2024)

Music video
- "Love 119" on YouTube "Love 119" (Japanese ver.) on YouTube

"Love 119" is a song recorded by South Korean boy band Riize. It was released on January 5, 2024, through SM Entertainment and distributed by Kakao Entertainment and RCA Records. It was later included as the eighth track on the group's EP Riizing. A Japanese version of "Love 119" was released on January 24, serving as the group's debut Japanese single. "Love 119" was the first single released by the group without the participation of member Seunghan, who was on hiatus from the group at the time of release and departed the group altogether in October 2024.

The song was a commercial success, peaking at number five on the Circle Digital Chart, becoming Riize's highest charting song to date. The song was also the group's first appearance on a Billboard chart, peaking at number 127 on the Global Excl. US chart.

== Background and release ==
On December 6, 2023 it was reported that Riize would be releasing a new single on January 5, three months after their previous single, "Talk Saxy". On January 1, SM Entertainment confirmed the date, sharing a short teaser clip on their YouTube channel showing the group's members playing in the snow. In the days leading up to the release, SM continued to tease the song, launching a "Love 119 Mailbox" microsite in the style of an early 2000s mobile phone, and sharing an extended clip of the song's instrumental.

The Korean version of "Love 119" was released for digital download and streaming on January 5, followed later by the Japanese version on January 24.

== Composition ==
"Love 119"
In "Love 119", Riize makes heavy use of vocal harmonies, singing over a "nostalgic" instrumental reminiscent of the early 2000s, and sampling "Emergency Room" (2005) by Izi.

"Love 119" captures the feeling of falling in love for the first time. The juxtaposition of the rhythmic drum beats and soft piano riffs creates this dreamy, melancholic vibe. The chorus part is particularly addictive, so it would be great if you could sing along with it.

— Riize member Eunseok on the song's meaning, L'Officiel Malaysia

The Korean lyrics for "Love 119" were written by Jeong Da-seul, ChaMane, Moon Seol-lee, and Jo Yoon-kyung, while Japanese lyrics were contributed by Mahiro. Composition and English lyrics for both versions were contributed by Jason Hahs, Colin Magalong, David Wilson and MZMC, with the latter two also handling arrangement. "Love 119" contains a prominent sample of the 2005 song "Emergency Room", as written and composed by Shin Dong-woo and performed by South Korean band Izi.

The song has been described as an "easy-listening", "dreamy" dance-pop track reminiscent of late 1990s and early 2000s music, characterized by a "sweet" piano riff and drum beats. Vocally, the song makes heavy use of harmonies, including a cappella, vocal layering, and choir-like segments. In the track's lyrics, the group sings about the feeling of first love, comparing it with an emergency situation. "Love 119" was composed in the key of A-flat major, with a tempo of 99 beats per minute.

== Critical reception ==
"Love 119" received a positive critical reception, with critics noting that the song sounded "fresh" and "exciting." Writing for Clash, Robin Murray wrote that the song was "irresistibly catchy", and that the song allowed "each member of Riize to shine, building to something seamless and unified." For Weverse Magazine, music critic Kim Do-heon wrote that the song was "a combination of nostalgia and reminiscence", and that it was a "move towards the revival and renaissance of SM Entertainment in the mid-to-late 2000s" Joanna Rose of The Honey Pop opined that the song was "magical", and that the song delivered "relatable authenticity."

== Music video ==
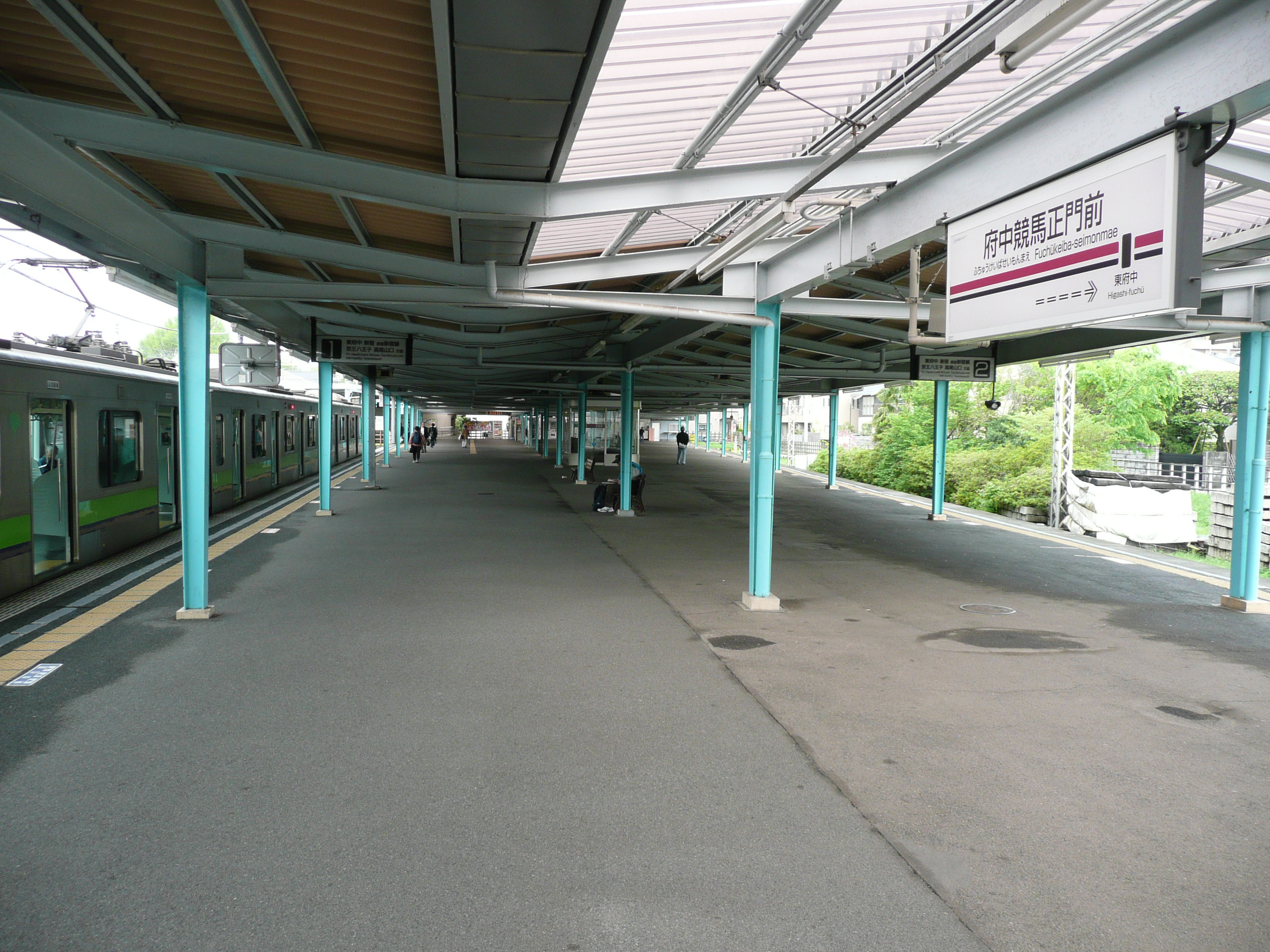
Fuchūkeiba-seimommae Station in Fuchū, Tokyo is featured prominently in the music video.

The music video for Love 119 was first was previewed on January 1, 2024 along with the announcement of the song's upcoming release, with SM Entertainment publishing a 19-second long teaser onto their official YouTube channel. The music video was also teased on the group's official website, with still images from the clip being posted to a microsite that was styled to look like an early 2000s mobile phone.

The full music video was released simultaneously with the song, premiering on SM's YouTube channel on January 5, while the Japanese version was released on January 24 concurrently with that version of the song. Directed by Byul Yun, the music videos were shot in December 2023 at various locations across Japan, including scenes in Ōta and at Fuchūkeiba-seimommae Station in Fuchū, both located in Tokyo.

The music video opens with Riize member Sohee sleeping in a bed (Shotaro in the Japanese version). A radio broadcast begins to announce a satellite launch, and he is awoken by a strange message on his cell phone. Startled, he throws ping pong balls at it. The video then cuts to the rest of the group members riding a train, receiving a similar strange message. In other scenes, the group is seen observing a love interest from afar, and practicing the song's choreography. The video ends with the group playing in a snow-covered forest.

The group noted that "Love 119" was their first music video with a storyline, and the first time they had tried acting.

== Live performances ==
Following the release of "Love 119", Riize performed on four South Korean music programs: KBS's Music Bank on January 5 and 12, SBS's Inkigayo on January 7 and 14, Mnet's M Countdown on January 11 and 18, and MBC's Show! Music Core on January 13 and 20. In Japan, the group performed the song on NHK's Venue101 on January 27, and FNS's Mezamashi TV on April 15.

To further promote the song, the group also performed the song on MBC's It's Live, and Dingo Music's Dingo Live, as well as the Japanese version on The First Take. At the 13th Circle Chart Music Awards on January 10, the group performed "Love 119" in a medley along with previous single "Get a Guitar."

The song was also included in the setlist of the group's 2024 Riizing Day concert tour.

== Accolades ==
Music program awards for "Love 119"
Program	Date	Ref.
M Countdown	January 18, 2024	
Inkigayo	January 21, 2024	

== Credits and personnel ==
Credits adapted from the Riizing liner notes and Naver Vibe.

Studio

- SM Yellow Tail Studio – recording, mix engineering
- SM Droplet Studio – recording
- Doobdoob Studio – recording, digital editing
- Sound Pool Studio – digital editing
- SM Concert Hall Studio – mixing
- Sterling Sound – mastering

Personnel

- SM Entertainment – executive producer
- Jang Cheol-hyuk – executive supervisor
- Tak Young-jun – executive supervisor
- Riize – vocals
- Jason Hahs – lyrics, composition
- Colin Magalong – lyrics, composition, background vocals
- David Wilson – lyrics, composition, arrangement
- MZMC – lyrics, composition, arrangement
- Jeong Da-seul – lyrics
- ChaMane – lyrics
- Moon Seol-lee – lyrics
- Jo Yoon-kyung – lyrics
- Mahiro – lyrics
- Esbee – background vocals
- Oh Jin-seong – background vocals
- Jason Hahs – background vocals
- Shin Song-eui – piano
- Noh Min-ji – recording, engineering
- Kim Joo-hyun – recording
- Kwon Yu-jin – recording, digital editing
- Jeong Ho-jin – digital editing
- Nam Gong-jin – mixing
- Chris Gehringer – mastering

== Charts ==
=== Weekly charts ===
Weekly chart performance for "Love 119"
Chart (2024)	Peak position
Global Excl. US (Billboard)	127
Japan (Japan Hot 100)	74
New Zealand Hot Singles (RMNZ)	20
South Korea (Circle)	5

Weekly chart performance for "Love 119 (Japanese ver.)"
Chart (2024)	Peak position
Japan (Japan Hot 100)	52

=== Monthly charts ===
Monthly chart performance for "Love 119"
Chart (2024)	Position
South Korea (Circle)	7

=== Year-end charts ===
Year-end chart performance for "Love 119"
Chart	Year	Position
South Korea (Circle)	2024	27
South Korea (Circle)	2025	143

== Release history ==
Release history for "Love 119"
Region	Date	Format	Language	Label
Various	January 5, 2024	Digital download; streaming	Korean	SM; Kakao
Various	January 24, 2024	Digital download; streaming	Japanese	SM
