= Odyssey (Riize album) =

- Digital cover

Studio album by Riize
- Released: May 19, 2025
- Studio: Seoul; SM Azure (Seoul); SM Starlight (Seoul); SM Wavelet (Seoul); SM Yellow Tail (Seoul); Sound Pool (Seoul)
- Genre: K-pop
- Length: 29:47
- Language: Korean; English
- Label: SM; Kakao; RCA
- Producer: Kasper Almkvist; Chanti; Collapsedone; Strong Dragon; John Flynn; Joel Gunnarsson; Humbler; Kenzie; Mathilde Clara Nyegaard; Matthew Jung; Oscar Ögren; Stian Nyhammer Olsen; Jop Pangemanan; PhD; Pizzapunk; Justin Reinstein; Wyatt Sanders; Yoon Sang; Matt Zara

Riize chronology
Riizing (2024)	Odyssey (2025)	Fame (2025)

Singles from Odyssey
- 1. "Fly Up" Released: May 19, 2025

Odyssey is the first studio album by South Korean boy group Riize. It was released by SM Entertainment on May 19, 2025, and contains ten tracks, including the lead single "Fly Up".

== Background and release ==
In February 2025, SM Entertainment announced in its roadmap that Riize would make their comeback in the second quarter of 2025. On April 28, 2025, it was announced that Riize would release their first studio album titled Odyssey on May 19. The album trailer video was also released on the same day. Promotional schedule was released on the next day on April 29.

Teaser images for the album were released on a regular basis between April 30 and May 15. Several promotional videos were released ahead of the album. The first was the music video for the track "Bag Bad Back", which premiered on May 1. This was followed by a track video for "Ember to Solar" on May 6. On May 11, a monologue video was also released. A full-length video featuring all ten songs from the album premiered via Weverse on May 14. The album was released alongside the music video for "Fly Up" on May 19.

== Promotion ==
On May 1, 2025, SM Entertainment announced that Riize will embark on their concert tour titled Riizing Loud, set to take place from July 2025 to February 2026. The tour will include 24 shows across 14 cities throughout Asia, and will serve as a major promotional effort for the album. Prior to the release of Odyssey, on May 19, 2025, Riize held a showcase event titled "Riize the 1st Album 'Odyssey' Premiere" at Blue Square Hall. The event was broadcast live on YouTube, TikTok, and Weverse, aimed at introducing the album and connecting with their fanbase.

To promote the song "Fly Up", they performed the lead single on Mnet M2's Move to Performance on May 21. They later performed the song on various music shows, Mnet's M Countdown on May 22, KBS2's Music Bank on May 23, MBC's Show! Music Core on May 24, and SBS's Inkigayo on May 25.

== Track listing ==
Odyssey track listing
No.	Title	Lyrics	Music	Arrangement	Length
1.	"Odyssey"	Lee Seu-ran	Mathilde Clara Nyegaard; Oscar Ögren; Joel Gunnarsson; Kasper Almkvist	Nyegaard; Ögren; Gunnarsson; Almkvist	2:32
2.	"Bag Bad Back"	Bigone	Strong Dragon; Jacob Aaron; Drew Love	Strong Dragon	3:13
3.	"Ember to Solar" (잉걸; Inggeol)	Kenzie	Woomin Lee "Collapsedone"; Justin Reinstein; Jyll; Andreas Ringblom	Collapsedone; Reinstein	3:21
4.	"Fly Up"	Hwang Yoo-bin; Deepflow	Stian Nyhammer Olsen; Julia Bognar Finnseter; Jop Pangemanan; Albin Tengblad; Aaron	Olsen	2:58
5.	"Show Me Love"	Ha Yoon-ah; Lilijune	Matt Zara; Scott Quinn; Måns Zelmerlöw; Jon Eyden	Zara	3:10
6.	"Passage"		Yoon Sang; Matthew Jung; Kim Hye-hyun	Yoon; Jung	0:40
7.	"Midnight Mirage"	Danke	John Flynn; Wyatt Sanders; Colin Magalong	Flynn; Sanders	3:23
8.	"The End of the Day" (모든 하루의 끝; Modeun haruui kkeut; 'The end of every day')	Kim A-hyun; Humbler	Kim; Humbler	Humbler	3:43
9.	"Inside My Love"	Kenzie	Kenzie; Daniel Davidsen; Peter Wallevik; David Arkwright; Ben Samama	PhD	2:40
10.	"Another Life"	Moon Seol-ri	Ronny Svendsen; Adrian Thesen; Henrik Heaven; Chanti	Chanti; Pizzapunk	3:47
Total length:					29:27

== Credits and personnel ==
Credits adapted from the album's liner notes.

Studio

- SM Azure Studio – recording (1, 3), digital editing (1)
- SM Starlight Studio – recording, engineered for mix (2), digital editing (9)
- SM Droplet Studio – recording (2), engineered for mix (3)
- SM Yellow Tail Studio – recording, digital editing (4), engineered for mix (4, 10)
- SM Wavelet Studio – recording, engineered for mix (5)
- Seoul Studio – recording (6, 8)
- SM Aube Studio – recording, digital editing, engineered for mix (7, 9)
- SM Big Shot Studio – recording, digital editing, engineered for mix (8)
- Sound Pool Studio – recording (10)
- 77F Studio – digital editing (2, 5)
- Doobdoob Studio – digital editing (3, 10)
- SM Blue Cup Studio – digital editing (7), mixing (2–3, 7)
- GCA Studio – engineered for mix (1)
- Klang Studio – mixing (1)
- SM Concert Hall Studio – mixing (4, 6, 8, 10)
- SM Blue Ocean Studio – mixing (5, 9)
- Sterling Sound – mastering (all)

Personnel

- SM Entertainment – executive producer
- Riize – vocals (all), background vocals (5)
  - Shotaro – background vocals (5)
  - Eunseok – background vocals (5)
  - Sungchan – background vocals (5)
  - Wonbin – background vocals (1, 3, 5)
  - Sohee – background vocals (1, 5)
  - Anton – background vocals (1, 5)
- Oscar Ögren – producer (1)
- Joel Gunnarsson – producer (1)
- Strong Dragon (The Hub) – producer (2), keyboards (2), synthesizer (2), programming (2)
- Jacob Aaron (The Hub) – background vocals (2, 4)
- Drew Love – background vocals (2)
- Kenzie – producer (9), vocal directing (9)
- Woo Min Lee "Collapsedone" – producer (3)
- Justin Reinstein – producer (3)
- Stian Nyhammer Olsen – producer (4)
- Julia Bognar Finnseter – background vocals (4)
- Jop Pangemanan – background vocals (4)
- Matt Zara – producer (5)
- Scott Quinn – background vocals (5)
- Måns Zelmerlöw – background vocals (5)
- Yoon Sang – producer (6)
- Matthew Jung – producer (6)
- Kim Hye-hyun – strings conducting (6), strings arrangement (6)
- John Flynn – producer (7)
- Wyatt Sanders – producer (7)
- Humbler – producer (8), vocal directing (8)
- Daniel Davidsen (PhD) – producer (9)
- Peter Wallevik (PhD) – producer (9)
- Ronny Svendsen – producer (10)
- Adrian Thesen (Pizzapunk) – producer (10)
- Ondine – vocal directing (1)
- Hwang Se-hyun – background vocals (1)
- Young Chance – vocal directing (2), background vocals (2)
- Jang Jin-young – vocal directing (3), background vocals (3)
- Kim Sung-pil – background vocals (3)
- G-High – vocal directing (4)
- Andrew Choi – background vocals (4, 9)
- Jsong – background vocals (4)
- Sam Carter – vocal directing (5), background vocals (5)
- Kim Tae-hyung (PIT300) – vocal directing (7)
- Joowon – vocal directing (10), background vocals (7, 10)
- Yoseph – background vocals (8)
- Joseph K – piano (2)
- Yung – strings (6, 8)
- Park Chan-min – bass (8)
- Choi Young-hoon – guitar (8)
- Choi Soo-in – piano (8)
- Eo Young-soo – strings conducting (8), strings arrangement (8)
- Kim Sung-hyun – strings conducting (8), strings arrangement (8)
- Kim Jae-yeon – recording (1, 3), digital editing (1)
- Jeong Yoo-ra – recording (2), engineered for mix (2), digital editing (9)
- Kim Joo-hyun – recording (2), engineered for mix (3)
- Noh Min-ji – recording (4), digital editing (4), engineered for mix (4, 10)
- Kang Eun-ji – recording (5), engineered for mix (5)
- Jeong Ki-hong – recording (6, 8)
- Choi Da-in – recording assistant (6)
- Kim Hyo-joon – recording (7, 9), digital editing (7, 9), engineered for mix (7, 9)
- Lee Min-kyu – recording (8), digital editing (8), engineered for mix (8)
- Joo Ye-chan – recording assistant (8)
- Jeong Ho-jin – recording (10)
- Kim Dong-il – recording (10)
- Woo Min-jeong – digital editing (2, 5)
- Eugene Kwon – digital editing (3, 10)
- Jung Eui-seok – digital editing (7), mixing (2–3, 7)
- Eom Se-hyun – engineered for mix (1)
- Koo Jong-pil – mixing (1)
- Nam Koong-jin – mixing (4, 6, 8, 10)
- Kim Cheol-sun – mixing (5, 9)
- Randy Merrill – mastering (all)

== Charts ==
=== Weekly charts ===
Weekly chart performance for Odyssey
Chart (2025)	Peak position
Japanese Albums (Oricon)	2
Japanese Combined Albums (Oricon)	2
Japanese Hot Albums (Billboard Japan)	3
South Korean Albums (Circle)	1
US Top Album Sales (Billboard)	9
US World Albums (Billboard)	4

=== Monthly charts ===
Monthly chart performance for Odyssey
Chart (2025)	Position
Japanese Albums (Oricon)	5
South Korean Albums (Circle)	2

=== Year-end charts ===
Year-end chart performance for Odyssey
Chart (2025)	Position
Japanese Albums (Oricon)	41
Japanese Top Albums Sales (Billboard Japan)	35
South Korean Albums (Circle)	8

== Certifications ==
Certifications for Odyssey
Region	Certification	Certified units/sales
South Korea (KMCA)	Million	1,000,000^{^}
South Korea (KMCA) SMC	Platinum	250,000^{^}
^{^} Shipments figures based on certification alone.

== Release history ==
Release history for Odyssey
Region	Date	Format	Label
South Korea	May 19, 2025	CD	SM; Kakao
Various	May 19, 2025	Digital download; streaming	SM; Kakao
United States	July 11, 2025	CD	SM; RCA
