= Jungsan High School =

Private school in Seoul, South Korea

- 중산고등학교 (中山高等學校)
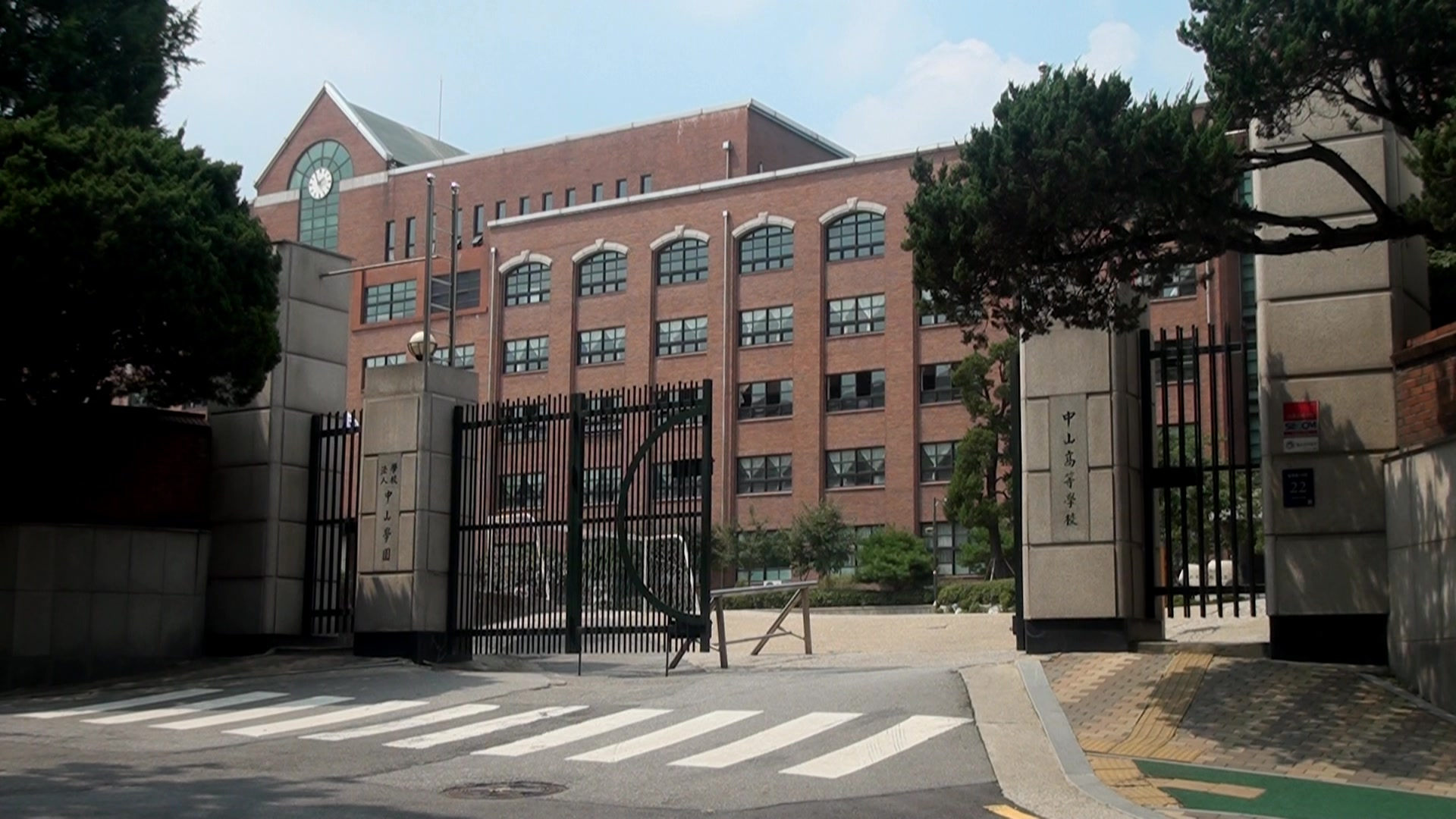

Location
- Irwon-dong, Gangnam-gu; Seoul; South Korea

Information
- Type: Private
- Motto: Honesty, Diligence, Sincerity (정직, 근면, 성실)
- Established: March 1, 1994
- Founder: Shin Ho-il
- Chairman: Shin Young-cheol
- Principal: Ryu Man-yeol
- Faculty: 93 (2014)
- Grades: 10–12
- Gender: Man's High school
- Enrollment: 1444 (2014)
- Tree: Juniper
- Flower: Royal Azalea
- Website: www.jungsan.hs.kr

Jungsan High School (Korean: 중산고등학교; Hanja: 中山高等學校) is located in Irwon-dong, Gangnam-gu, Seoul.

Jungsan High School is a man's private school founded in 1994. This school is famous for various activities done in the club and in the school. Is one of the schools among Gangnam - 8 school district. Jungsan High School is famous for math education and science branch.

== Timeline ==
- Established an educational foundation "Jungsan Hakwon" on December 19, 1989
- Founded on March 1, 1994
- First entrance ceremony on March 2, 1994
- 20th School anniversary on March 25, 2014

== Notable alumni ==
- Moon Hee-joon
- Song Chang-eui
- Seunghan

== See also ==
- Education in South Korea
