= Talk Saxy =

Single by Riize

from the EP Riizing
- Language: Korean; English
- Released: October 27, 2023
- Studio: SM SSAM
- Genre: Dance
- Length: 3:10
- Label: SM; Kakao; RCA
- Composers: Brice Fox; Tony Ferrari; Jurek Reunamäki; Samuil; Tay Jasper; Adrian McKinnon
- Lyricists: Danke; Brice Fox; Tony Ferrari; Jurek Reunamäki

Riize singles chronology
"Get a Guitar" (2023)	"Talk Saxy" (2023)	"Love 119" (2024)

Music video
- "Talk Saxy" on YouTube

"Talk Saxy" is a song recorded by South Korean boy band Riize. It was released on October 27, 2023, through SM Entertainment and distributed by Kakao Entertainment and RCA Records. It was later included as the seventh track on the group's EP Riizing. "Talk Saxy" is last single released by the group with the participation of member Seunghan, who took a hiatus from the group shortly after the song's release, and departed the group in 2024.

== Background and release ==
South Korean boy band Riize made their debut on September 4, 2023 with the release of their single album Get a Guitar. The album was commercially successful, selling over one million copies in the first week of its release. One month later, SM Entertainment, in announcing their release lineup for the fourth quarter of 2023, indicated that the group would release a follow-up single at the end of October. On October 23, SM officially announced that "Talk Saxy" would be released to digital download and streaming platforms on October 27.

== Composition ==
"Talk Saxy"
"Talk Saxy" features a saxophone riff and 808-style drum machine beats throughout.

With "Talk Saxy," we were able to show a different charm than our previous song. It felt like an outfit that fits us well, as it is a song for a powerful performance.

— Riize member Wonbin on the song's meaning, Vanity Teen

Lyrics for "Talk Saxy" were written by Brice Fox, Tony Ferrari, Jurek Reunamäki, with additional Korean lyrics written by songwriting team Danke. Fox, Ferrari, and Reunamäki also contributed to composition, along with Samuil, Jeremy "Tay" Jasper, and Adrian McKinnon. Arrangement was completed by Fox and Benjamin 55. Upon its announcement, SM Entertainment described the track as a dance-pop composition that features an "addictive" saxophone riff throughout, with "strong" 808-style drum machine beats. Others have described the song as having an "old school" sound, with a "pulsing beat". Lyrically, "Talk Saxy" revolves around one's attraction to a stranger and gaining their attention. "Talk Saxy" was composed in the key of F minor, with a tempo of 89 beats per minute.

== Critical reception ==
"Talk Saxy" received a positive response from critics. Alessandra Rincon, writing for Ones to Watch, opined that the individual band member's talents "shine" on the "catchy" verses, and that their "engaging and smooth vocals are the perfect counterpoint to the omnipresent sax riffs". For Billboard, Starr Bowenbank wrote that "Talk Saxy" was "gutsy" and "high-energy", and compared the song's saxophone riff to Jason Derulo's "Talk Dirty" and Fifth Harmony's "Worth It". The Kraze's Cidney Atcherson wrote that the song was "so addicting" and "a banger".

== Music video ==
The music video for "Talk Saxy" was first teased two days before the song's release, with SM Entertainment sharing a 17-second clip on their official YouTube channel. Another 17-second teaser was released the following day. The full video was released onto SM's YouTube channel simultaneously with the song on October 27. Directed by Lafic, the video was shot in early October 2023. The music video sees the group performing the song in various flashy studios, backed by large speakers, globe lights, neon floors and graffiti. Wearing 1990s-style outfits such as baggy jeans and sports jerseys, the video has been described as paying homage to boy bands of the era such as Shinee, Backstreet Boys, NSYNC, and B2K.

== Live performances ==
Following the release of "Get a Guitar", Riize performed on six South Korean music programs: KBS's Music Bank on October 27 and November 3, MBC's Show! Music Core on October 28 and November 4, SBS's Inkigayo on October 29 and November 5, and Mnet's M Countdown on November 9.

To further promote the song, the group also performed on Mnet's Performance37, and MBC's It's Live. The group also performed the song at several music awards ceremonies. At the 2023 MAMA Awards on November 29, the group performed "Talk Saxy" and "Siren". For the group's performance at the 2023 Melon Music Awards, member Wonbin playing a guitar solo introduction before transitioning into a full group performance of "Get a Guitar" and "Talk Saxy". At the 33rd Seoul Music Awards on January 2, 2024, the band again performed the song in a medley along with "Get a Guitar".

The song was also included in the setlist of the group's 2024 Riizing Day concert tour.

== Credits and personnel ==
Credits adapted from the Riizing liner notes.

Studio

- SM SSAM Studio – recording, engineered for mix
- 77F Studio – digital editing
- SM Lyvin Studio – engineered for mix
- SM Blue Cup Studio – mixing
- Sterling Sound – mastering

Personnel

- SM Entertainment – executive producer
- Jang Cheol-hyuk – executive supervisor
- Riize – vocals
- Brice Fox – lyrics, composition
- Tony Ferrari – lyrics, composition, background vocals
- Jurek Reunamäki – lyrics, composition, arrangement
- Danke – lyrics
- Samuil – composition
- Tay Jasper – composition
- Adrian McKinnon – composition
- Benjamin 55 – arrangement
- 1Take – vocal direction
- Young Chance – background vocals
- Simon Petrén – piano
- Kang Eun-ji – recording, engineering
- Kim Hyo-jun – recording
- Woo Min-jeong – digital editing
- Lee Ji-hong – engineering
- Jeong Ui-seok – mixing
- Chris Gehringer – mastering

== Charts ==
=== Weekly charts ===
Weekly chart performance for "Talk Saxy"
Chart (2023–2024)	Peak position
Japan Download Songs (Billboard Japan)	69
South Korea (Circle)	68

=== Monthly charts ===
Monthly chart performance for "Talk Saxy"
Chart (2024)	Position
South Korea (Circle)	78

=== Year-end charts ===
Year-end chart performance for "Talk Saxy"
Chart (2024)	Position
South Korea (Circle)	163

== Release history ==
Release history for "Talk Saxy"
Region	Date	Format	Label
Various	October 27, 2023	Digital download; streaming	SM; Kakao
