= Lucky (Riize song) =

- Digital cover

Single by Riize
- Language: Japanese; English
- B-side: "Be My Next"; "Same Key"
- Released: July 29, 2024
- Studio: SM Aube; SM Droplet
- Genre: Funk; pop
- Length: 2:47
- Label: SM; EMI; Universal Japan
- Composers: Robert Habolin; Benjamin Ingrosso
- Lyricists: Robert Habolin; Benjamin Ingrosso; Takahashi Shiho

Riize singles chronology
"Boom Boom Bass" (2024)	"Lucky" (2024)	"Combo" (2024)

Riize Japanese singles chronology
"Love 119" (2024)	"Lucky" (2024)	"All of You" (2026)

Music video
- "Lucky" on YouTube "Lucky" (Good Luck Trolls Ver.) on YouTube

"Lucky" is a song recorded by South Korean boy band Riize. It was released digitally on July 29, 2024, followed by a CD single on September 5, along with B-side tracks "Be My Next" and "Same Key". The song serves as the group's first original Japanese single, and second Japanese single overall. Released through SM Entertainment and Universal Music Japan, "Lucky" was commercially successful, reaching number-one in Japan on the Oricon Singles Chart and Oricon Combined Singles Chart, and number-two on the Billboard Japan Hot 100. It was released without the participation of member Seunghan, who was on hiatus from the group at the time and departed from the group in October 2024.

== Background and release ==
In January 2024, Riize released a version of their song "Love 119" recorded in Japanese, becoming their first song in the language. On May 20, news of "Lucky"'s release was included in a teaser calendar for the group's first EP, Riizing.

"Same Key", later included as one of the B-side tracks on "Lucky", was released on July 13 as part of the soundtrack for the TV Asahi drama mini-series Makeup with Mud. It was the group's first soundtrack appearance.

SM Entertainment officially announced on July 23 that "Lucky" would be released digitally that Monday, July 29, followed by a physical release on September 5. The song was marketed as Riize's "official" Japanese debut, and is their first original Japanese single.

== Composition ==
"Lucky"
"Lucky" is a funk-pop song characterized by upbeat guitars and rhythmic drums.

"Lucky" is a funk-pop song characterized by upbeat guitars and rhythmic drums with lyrics about "boldly winning over love". Lyrics for the song were written by Robert Habolin, Benjamin Ingrosso and Takahashi Shiho, with Habolin and Ingrosso handling composition and Habolin contributing arrangement. "Lucky" runs 2 minutes 47 seconds and was composed in the key of E major with a tempo of 113 beats per minute.

== Commercial reception ==
Within Japan, "Lucky" was commercially successful. On the Oricon Singles Chart, the song entered at number-one for the tracking week ending September 8, selling 213,000 units. On the Oricon Combined Singles Chart, the song also debuted at number-one for the week ending September 8. On Billboard Japan's Billboard Japan Hot 100, "Lucky" peaked at number-two for the chart published September 11.

"Lucky" peaked at number-two for the September 2024 issue of the monthly Oricon Singles Chart with estimated sales of 322,872 units, and was certified Platinum by the Recording Industry Association of Japan for sales exceeding 250,000.

== Music video ==
The music video for "Lucky" was first previewed the day prior to release in a 17-second teaser video shared on SM Entertainment's official YouTube channel. The song's music video was released simultaneously with the track on July 29. Directed by Cho Joon-ko, the music shows the group performing the song's choreography in colourful outfits with humorous special effects.

A second music video was released on September 6 in collaboration with DreamWorks Animation's Trolls brand. The animated music video, entitled "Good Luck Trolls ver.", portrays members of the group as troll dolls.

== Live performances ==
To promote the song's release, TV Asahi aired two-week special on September 28 and October 5 entitled Riize Surprise Live. The program consisted of the group performing a variety of songs, including "Lucky" and other songs from their catalogue. They also performed the song on TBS Television's CDTV Live! Live! on August 5.

The song was also added to the setlist of the group's 2024 Riizing Day concert tour, beginning with the first show after the song's release, on July 30 in Yokohama, Japan. The song was kept in the setlist for the remainder of the tour, including shows held outside Japan.

== Track listing ==
Track listing adapted from the single's liner notes.

Track listing for "Lucky"
No.	Title	Lyrics	Music	Arrangement	Length
1.	"Lucky"	Robert Habolin; Benjamin Ingrosso; Takahashi Shiho	Habolin; Ingrosso	Habolin	2:47
2.	"Be My Next"	Stian Nyhammer Olsen; Jop Pangemanan; Max Drazen; Hasegawa	Olsen; Pangemanan; Drazen	Olsen	3:19
3.	"Same Key"	Fast Lane	Fast Lane	Fast Lane	4:03
Total length:					10:09

== Credits and personnel ==
Credits adapted from the single's liner notes.

Studio

- SM Aube Studio - recording (track 1)
- SM Droplet Studio - recording (track 1-2)
- Doobdoob Studio - recording, digital editing (all tracks)
- SM Big Shot Studio - recording (track 2)
- Sound Pool Studio - recording (track 3)
- SM Wavelet Studio - digital editing (track 2), engineered for mix (track 3)
- SM Blue Ocean Studio - mixing (track 1)
- SM Blue Cup Studio - mixing (track 2)
- SM Concert Hall Studio - mixing (track 3)
- Sterling Sound – mastering (all tracks)

Personnel

- SM Entertainment – executive producer
- Lee Sang-min – executive supervisor
- Kim Hyeong-guk - executive supervisor
- Riize – vocals (all tracks)
- Robert Habolin - lyrics, composition, arrangement, background vocals (track 1)
- Benjamin Ingrosso - lyrics, composition, background vocals (track 1)
- Stian Nyhammer Olsen - lyrics, composition, arrangement, instrumentation (track 2)
- Jop Pangemanan - lyrics, composition (track 2)
- Max Drazen - lyrics, composition (track 2)
- Takahashi Shiho - lyrics (track 1)
- Hasegawa - lyrics (track 2)
- Fast Lane - lyrics, composition, arrangement (track 3)
- Jonghan - background vocals, vocal direction (all tracks)
- Akira - background vocals (track 2)
- Kim Hyo-jun - recording (track 1)
- Kim Ju-hyeon - recording (track 1-2)
- Kwon Eu-gene - recording, digital editing (track 1, 3)
- Lee Min-kyu - recording (track 2)
- Woo Min-jung - recording (track 3)
- Kang Eun-ji - digital editing (track 2), engineered for mix (track 3)
- Jang Woo-young - digital editing (track 2)
- Kim Chul-soon - mixing (track 1)
- Jung Eui-seok - mixing (track 2)
- Jin Nam-koong - mixing (track 3)
- Chris Gehringer – mastering (all tracks)

== Charts ==
=== Weekly charts ===
Weekly chart performance for "Lucky"
Chart (2024)	Peak position
Japan (Japan Hot 100)	2
Japan (Oricon)	1
Japan Combined Singles (Oricon)	1
South Korea Download (Circle)	67

=== Monthly charts ===
Monthly chart performance for "Lucky"
Chart (2024)	Position
Japan (Oricon)	2

=== Year-end charts ===
Year-end chart performance for "Lucky"
Chart (2024)	Position
Japan Top Singles Sales (Billboard Japan)	30
Japan (Oricon)	26

== Certifications ==
Certifications for Lucky
Region	Certification	Certified units/sales
Japan (RIAJ)	Platinum	250,000^{^}
^{^} Shipments figures based on certification alone.

== Release history ==
Release history for "Lucky"
Region	Date	Format	Label
Various	July 29, 2024	Digital download; streaming	SM; EMI; Universal Japan
Japan	September 5, 2024	CD	SM; EMI; Universal Japan

== See also ==
- List of Oricon number-one singles of 2024
