= Combo (song) =

Single by Riize

from the EP Riizing: Epilogue
- Language: Korean; English
- Released: September 4, 2024
- Studio: SM Dorii; SM Wavelet
- Genre: Pop rock; alternative
- Length: 3:39
- Label: SM; Kakao; RCA
- Composers: Kenzie; Ronny Svendsen; Adrian Thesen; Anne Judith Wik; Bobii Lewis
- Lyricist: Kenzie

Riize singles chronology
"Lucky" (2024)	"Combo" (2024)	"Hug" (2025)

Music video
- "Combo (Special Video)" on YouTube

"Combo" is a song recorded by South Korean boy band Riize. It was released on September 4, 2024, through SM Entertainment and distributed by Kakao Entertainment and RCA Records, as the lead single of the reissued version of the band's first EP, Riizing: Epilogue.

== Background and release ==
"Combo" was first previewed in June 2024, with a portion of the song being used as background music in the trailer for the group's EP, Riizing. The song's title was not given, and it was not included on the original release of the EP. On September 2, SM Entertainment announced that Riize would be issuing a new version of the EP, to be entitled Riizing: Epilogue, as celebration of the group's one-year anniversary, including new track "Combo". The song was released to digital download and streaming platforms on September 4, 2024.

== Composition ==
"Combo"
"Combo" features dynamic drums, powerful electric guitar, and shouting vocals.

Lyrics for "Combo" were written by Kenzie, who also participated in the song's composition and arrangement. Additional contributions to composition were made by Ronny Svendsen, Adrian Thesen, Anne Judith Wik, and Bobii Lewis, with the former two also adding to arrangement. Most contributors are members of Norwegian songwriting collective Dsign Music. Characterized as an alternative pop rock song, the song features "dynamic" drums, "powerful" electric guitar, and "shouting" vocals. Lyrically, the song "tells a story that disrupts and ultimately completes each other’s world." "Combo" was composed in the key of B-flat major with a tempo of 140 beats per minute.

== Music video ==
The music video for "Combo" was released simultaneously with the song, being posted to SM Entertainment's official YouTube channel on September 4, 2024. The music video consists mostly of behind-the scenes footage captured during the filming of the Riizing: Epilogue trailer video.

== Live performances ==
"Combo" was performed for the first time on September 13, when it was included on the setlist of the group's Riizing Day encore shows in Seoul. In the performance, the group was suspended 40-feet in the air on wires, surrounded by an opaque sheet, smoke, and lasers. The second half of the performance featured fast-paced choreography. An official recording of the performance was released on the band's YouTube channel on September 20.

The band performed the song at the 2024 Melon Music Awards on November 30, 2024, including it in a medley performance with "Boom Boom Bass".

== Credits and personnel ==
Credits adapted from the Riizing: Epilogue liner notes.

Studio

- SM Wavelet Studio – recording, digital editing
- SM Droplet Studio – recording
- SM Blue Cup Studio – mixing
- Sterling Sound – mastering

Personnel

- SM Entertainment – executive producer
- Jang Cheol-hyuk – executive supervisor
- Riize – vocals
  - Eunseok – background vocals
  - Wonbin – background vocals
  - Sohee – background vocals
- Kenzie – lyrics, composition, arrangement, vocal direction
- Ronny Svendsen – composition, arrangement, guitars
- Adrian Thesen – composition, arrangement
- Anne Judith Wik – composition
- Bobii Lewis – composition, background vocals
- Kang Eun-ji – recording, digital editing
- Kim Joo-hyun – recording
- Jeong Eui-seok – mixing
- Chris Gehringer – mastering

== Charts ==
Weekly chart performance for "Combo"
Chart (2024)	Peak position
South Korea (Circle)	200

== Release history ==
Release history for "Combo"
Region	Date	Format	Label
Various	September 4, 2024	Digital download; streaming	SM; Kakao
