= Seunghan =

South Korean singer (born 2003)

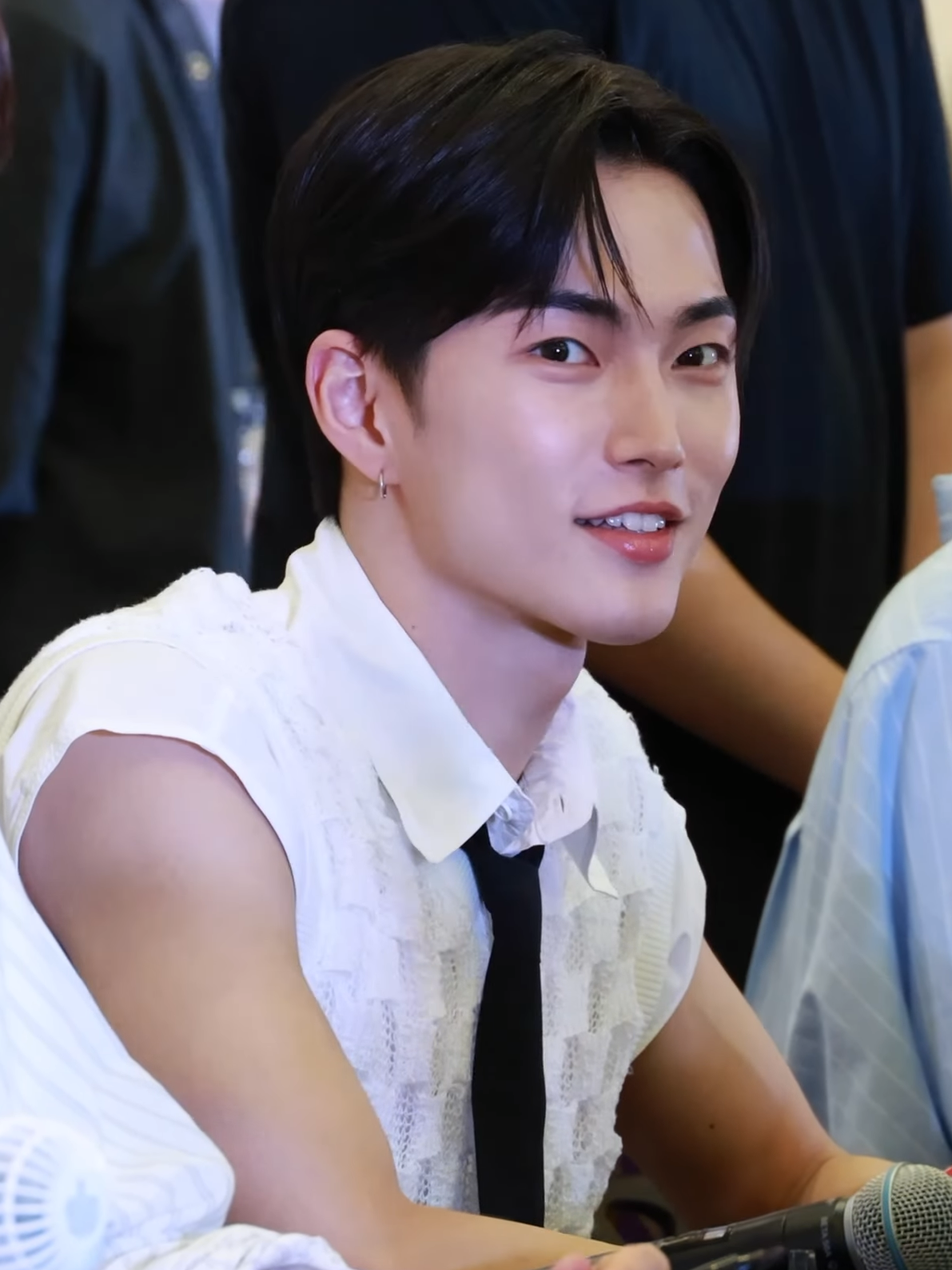
- Seunghan in 2023
- Born: Hong Seung-han; October 2, 2003 (age 23); Goyang, Gyeonggi Province, South Korea
- Other name: XngHan
- Education: School of Performing Arts Seoul
- Occupation: Singer
- Years active: 2022–present
- Musical career
- Genre: K-pop
- Labels: SM; Warner Japan
- Member of: SM Town
- Formerly of: SM Rookies; Riize

Korean name
- Hangul: 홍승한
- RR: Hong Seunghan
- MR: Hong Sŭnghan

Notes
- a: Seunghan's signature depicts his initials in Hangul (ㅎㅅㅎ).

Hong Seung-han (Korean: 홍승한; born October 2, 2003), known mononymously as Seunghan, is a South Korean singer. He is a former member of the South Korean boy band Riize, debuting under SM Entertainment in 2023. He debuted as a soloist in July 2025 with the release of Waste No Time under the stage name XngHan.

First introduced in July 2022 as a member of SM Entertainment's idol training team SM Rookies, Seunghan debuted in September 2023 as a member of Riize. Amid leaks and criticism regarding his personal life, Seunghan took a hiatus from the band beginning in November 2023, briefly returning in October 2024 only to withdraw permanently two days later amid backlash from a subset of the band's fans.

== Early life and education ==
Hong Seung-han was born on October 2, 2003, in Goyang, Gyeonggi Province, South Korea, and has a brother who is five years his senior. Seunghan attended Jungsan High School in Seoul's Gangnam District, before transferring to School of Performing Arts Seoul's Department of Practical Music in 2019. He graduated from the school in 2022.

Seunghan was cast by SM Entertainment in his final year of middle school, after completing an entrance exam for admission to an arts high school. He had received offers from other agencies, but selected SM due to his familiarity with the company and admiration for the friendships formed between its artists. Before his debut in Riize, Seunghan trained at SM for three-and-a-half years.

== Career ==
=== 2022–2023: Pre-debut activities, debut with Riize, and hiatus ===
Seunghan was first introduced to the public in a pictorial for WWD Korea on July 2, 2022, with SM Entertainment revealing him as a member of SM Rookies, the agency's pre-debut idol training team. He was introduced along with future fellow Riize member Eunseok, and future Mytro member Shohei.

As part of SM Rookies, Seunghan participated in the SM Town Live 2022: SMCU Express concert tour throughout August 2022, performing "Outro: Dream Routine" with then-NCT members (and future fellow Riize members) Shotaro and Sungchan. He also starred in Welcome to NCT Universe, a variety show showing Shotaro and Sungchan guiding the rookies through "everything about NCT". The ten-episode series aired from November 2022 to February 2023 on TVING in South Korea, and Nippon TV and Hulu in Japan.

In July 2023, The Chosun Ilbo reported that Seunghan was set to leave SM Rookies and debut in SM's new boy band that September.

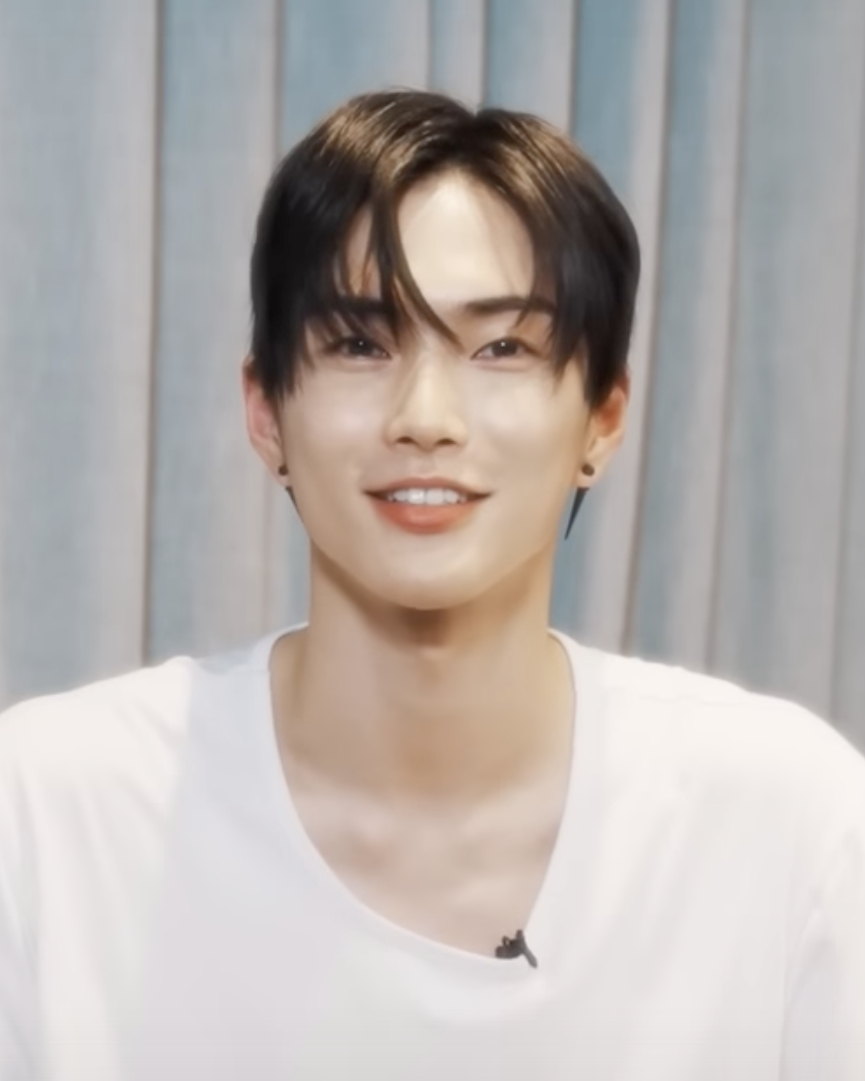
Seunghan in a 2023 promotional video for Sealook

Seunghan was officially introduced as a member of Riize on August 1, and made his first appearance with the group in a performance video for "Siren" on August 7. The group made their official debut on September 4 with the single album Get a Guitar, which sold more than a million copies in its first week, becoming the second-highest-selling debut album by a band. The group's follow-up single, "Talk Saxy", was released six weeks later, on October 27.

On November 22, in response to leaked photos from prior to his debut that showed him kissing a woman in a bed and smoking a cigarette, SM announced that Seunghan would take an indefinite hiatus from Riize. At the same time, Seunghan issued a hand-written apology letter to fans, and SM noted that the leaked photos were "severe defamation" and maliciously edited, and that they had identified the source and would be initiating legal proceedings against them.

During the hiatus, SM was criticized for their silence on Seunghan's status. Aside from their statement in November 2023, SM did not respond to any questions from fans and press regarding Seunghan's status with the band, and provided no updates on the legal actions it previously announced were being undertaken on Seunghan's behalf. In April 2024, upon Riize's release of the full-length version of "Siren", a song that was originally released in shortened form in August 2023, the agency attracted further criticism as Seunghan's vocals were removed from the song and dubbed by other members of the group.

=== 2024: Return to and withdrawal from Riize ===
On October 11, 2024, in a statement on the group's official Twitter account, the band's management announced that Seunghan would end his nearly 11-month hiatus and return to group activities with Riize. In the statement, they indicated that they had "determined that Riize's next chapter would be even more meaningful if the seven members were together" and that they empathized with fans who were worried or concerned due to the lack of updates over the previous 11 months. Shortly after, Seunghan posted a hand-written letter to his official Weverse fan community, apologizing once again and saying he was "deeply regretful and disappointed" over the controversial photos. He also added that his fellow Riize members were supportive of his return to the group and that he was "filled with gratitude and remorse for the second chance they have given [him]".

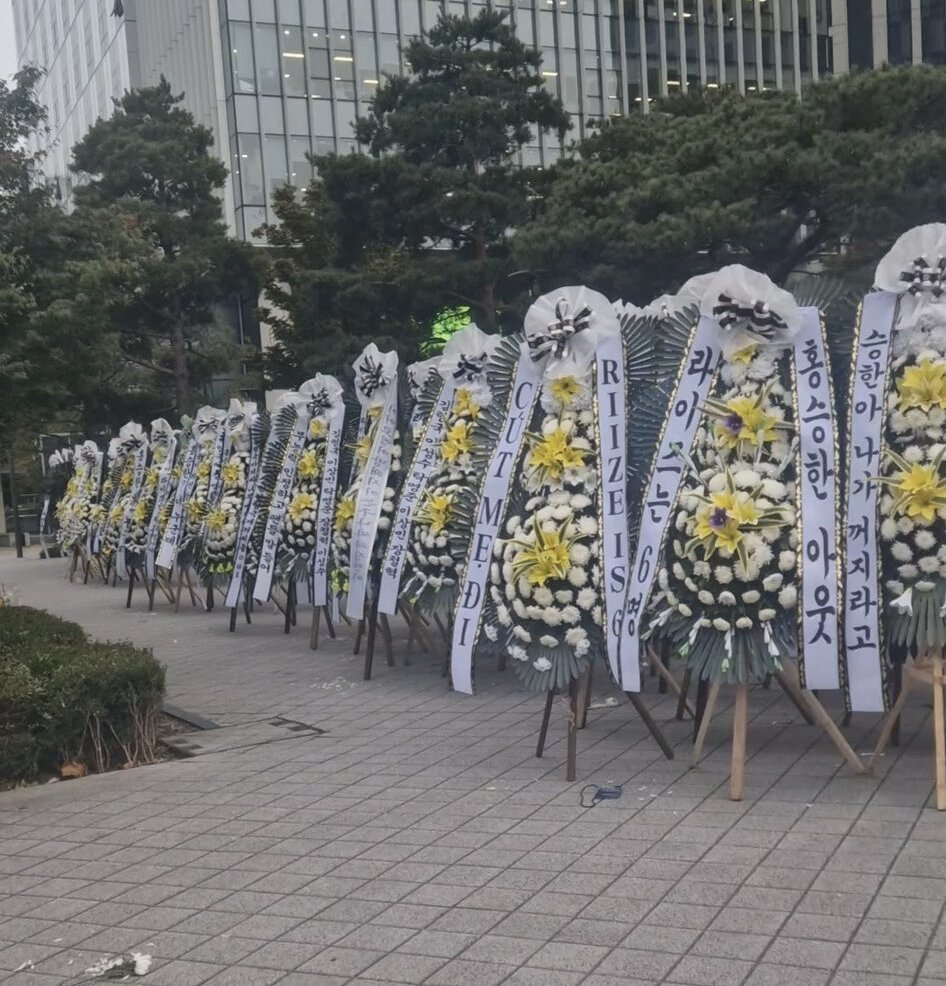
Funeral wreaths protesting about Seunghan's return outside SM Entertainment headquarters

The reaction to Seunghan's return was divided. In the hours immediately following the announcement protests were organized, mostly by South Korean fans, who felt that Seunghan had betrayed their trust and damaged Riize's reputation. That evening, over 1000 funeral wreaths began appearing on the plaza outside SM's headquarters in Seoul, bearing messages like "soul of the deceased, rest in peace", "freeloaders, get lost!" and "out with Seunghan", and trending hashtags like "#Seunghan_out" (#홍승한_아웃) and "#RIIZE_exists_as_six" (#RIIZE_6인으로_존재해) on Twitter in South Korea. Some also sent death threats to the singer. Conversely, international fans largely celebrated the comeback, with many arguing that Seunghan's hiatus constituted unfair punishment.

Two days after announcing his return, on October 13, the band's management issued another statement reversing course and announced that Seunghan would be leaving Riize, citing fan response. In the statement, they apologized for "causing confusion", and, referring to the previous decision to return him to the group, had "realized that [their] decision had actually hurt fans". Immediately after, Seunghan posted another hand-written letter on his Weverse fan community.

I think that my leaving the group is the right path for everyone. I don't want to cause any more hurt or confusion for the fans, and I don't want to harm the members any further, and I also don't want to hurt the company any further.

— Seunghan, on his Weverse fan community

==== Reaction and analysis ====
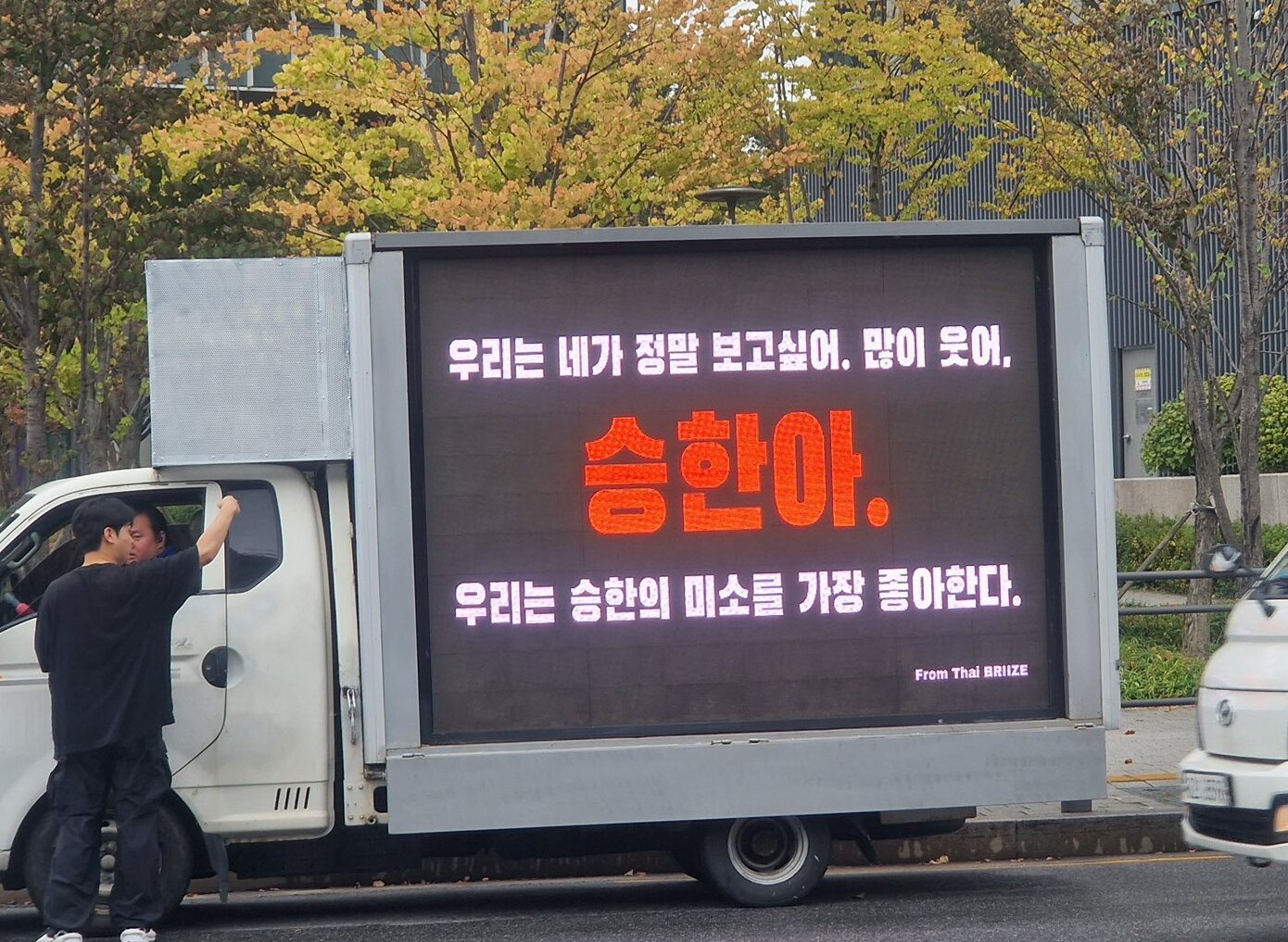
Mobile billboard sent by fans to support Seunghan, translated from Korean: "We miss you so much. Laugh a lot, Seunghan. We love your smile the most."

Many international Riize fans expressed support for Seunghan and condemned SM for caving to what they perceived as bullying and a toxic cancel culture mentality among South Korean fans. Other fans organized mobile billboards to be displayed in front of SM's headquarters displaying messages of support. A fan-created petition on Change.org demanding Seunghan's return to the band had generated over 300,000 signatures in the ten days following his exit.

Within the industry, Seunghan received support from SM labelmate Leeteuk of Super Junior and former Day6 member Jae Park, with the latter criticizing the act of protesting with funeral wreaths, calling the practice "disgusting" and suggesting that those responsible should face legal consequences. Others labeled the use of funeral wreaths as a protest method disruptive to the general public and burdensome for cleanup workers.

Protests over the events continued into November, with demonstrations occurring at the 2024 MAMA Awards in Los Angeles, which Riize attended. Fans protested outside the Dolby Theatre with banners that read "Idols are human, SM protect Seunghan" and flags bearing his face. Inside the venue, Billboard reported that protest material was confiscated by security, including any banners mentioning Seunghan or the band's existence as seven members, as well as anything colored orange, the band's unofficial color. Press covering the event reported that they were specifically told not to ask Riize about the controversy.

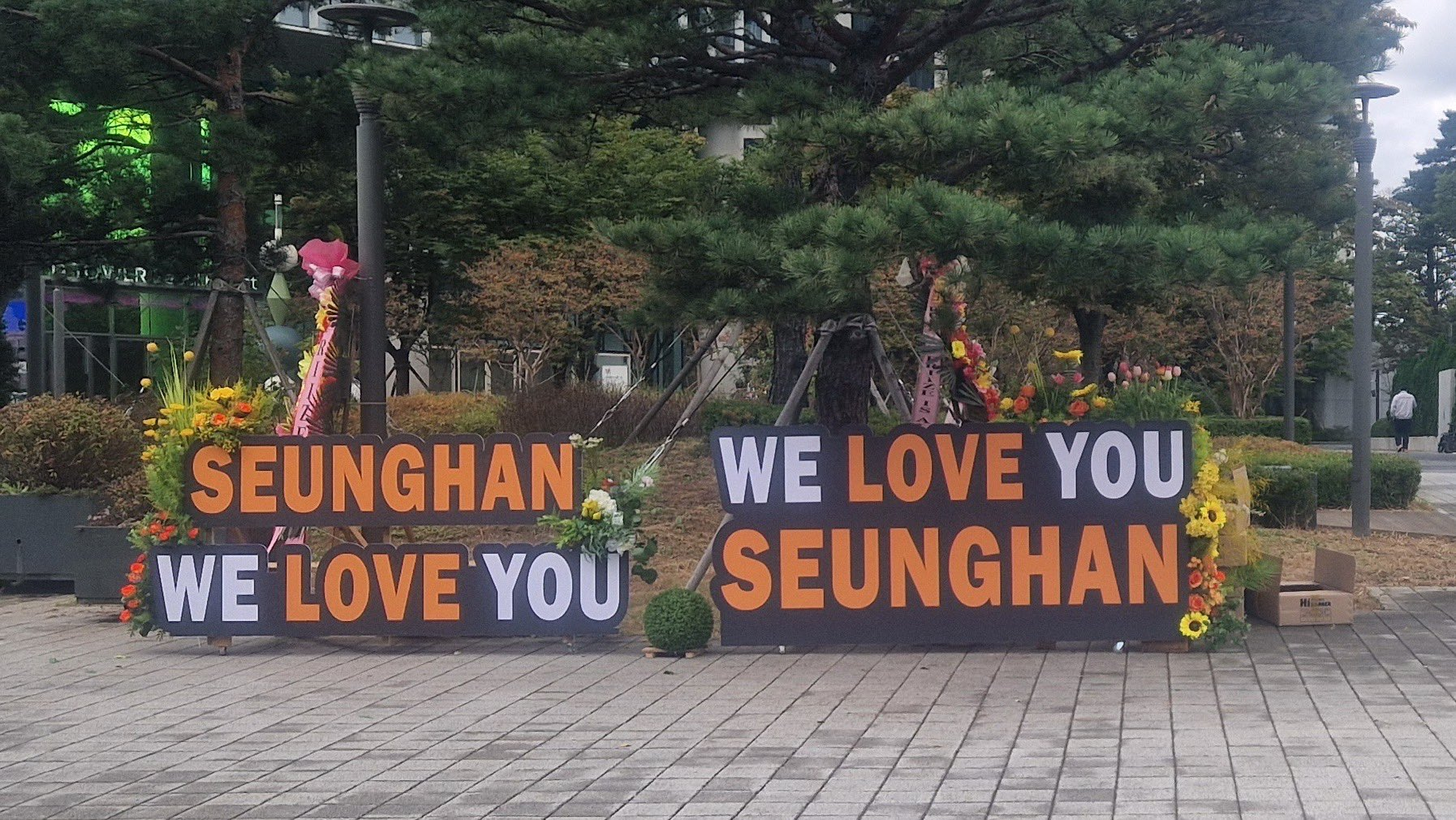
Fan project expressing support for Seunghan

Analyzing the events, Jeff Benjamin of Billboard opined that SM's handling of issues surrounding Seunghan had the potential to set a new industry precedent and a potential dangerous standard for other K-pop idols. He noted that South Korea's pop culture takes a conservative approach to idol behavior, in contrast with SM's perceived plans for Riize to appeal to a global audience. Speaking to NBC News, Stephanie Choi, a faculty expert on K-pop music at University at Buffalo, noted South Korean record labels are more likely to cater to domestic fans because they "actively participate in the idol-fan relationship by purchasing hundreds of album copies and meeting idols in person at events", while international fans "consume idols as media figures from a distance, without investing in the idol-fan relationship". Resonate Magazine noted that the clash between South Korean and international fans highlighted the cultural differences between the two groups, with South Korean fans feeling "a sense of ownership over their idols, expecting them to prioritize their careers and maintain a manufactured image of perfection" while internationally, K-pop idols are viewed "as artists first and foremost, deserving of personal lives and freedom of expression".

Writing for The Star, columnist Jan Lee called SM's decision to remove Seunghan only two days after announcing his return "the worst possible course of action", adding that "it is alarming that such a powerful entity would cave with such immediacy to the demands of 'fans', who maliciously send death wishes to an artist, when the industry has lost so many bright, young stars to suicide". Pamela Pascual, writing for Daily Tribune, said that Seunghan was "a case study in cancel culture", and that "K-pop idols often face nonstop criticism that goes beyond their music and targets their personal lives, looks, and choices". She also noted K-pop's history with cyberbullying and its consequences, referring to fellow SM artist Sulli, whose 2019 suicide was widely attributed to cyberbullying.

=== 2025–present: Solo debut with Waste No Time ===
On November 15, 2024, SM announced that Seunghan was preparing to debut as a solo artist in the second half of 2025. The same day, he opened official social media channels and shared several new photos. In June 2025, SPOTV News reported that Seunghan's solo debut was scheduled for July, with SM confirming the news later the same day. More information was made available over the following days, with SM announcing that Seunghan would be modifying his stage name as to be stylized as "XngHan", pronounced the same way but stylized with an X, which, according to the company, was to signify "infinite potential and crossover." It was also announced that he would be embarking on a new project, XngHan & Xoul, which will see him joined by two professional dancers, with the possibility of future expansion under the "Xoul" brand.

Waste No Time, Seunghan's debut single album, was released on July 31, 2025. The two-song album was promoted under the Xnghan&Xoul brand as a collaboration with two professional dancers.

On April 3, 2026, SM announced the release of his first extended play titled Glow which is expected to drop on the 27th. The EP will include five songs, including the title track of the same name.

== Discography ==
As a member of Riize, Seunghan participated in three singles. The first, "Memories", was released in August 2023, followed in September by "Get a Guitar". Both songs were included on the band's debut single album, Get a Guitar. "Talk Saxy", the final Riize single with Seunghan's participation, was released that October. The song was later included as the seventh track on the group's debut EP, Riizing, released in June 2024.

=== Extended plays ===
| Title | Details | Peak chart positions | | Sales |
| Title | Details | KOR | JPN | Sales |
|---|---|---|---|---|
| Glow | Released: April 27, 2026; Label: SM; Formats: CD, digital download, streaming | 6 | 14 | KOR: 114,059; JPN: 2,679 |

=== Single albums ===
| Title | Details | Peak chart positions | Sales |
| Title | Details | KOR | Sales |
|---|---|---|---|
| Waste No Time | Released: July 31, 2025; Label: SM; Formats: CD, digital download, streaming | 4 | KOR: 105,240 |

=== Korean singles ===
List of Korean singles, showing year released, selected chart positions, and name of the album
| Title | Year | Peak chart positions | Album |
| Title | Year | KOR Down. | Album |
|---|---|---|---|
| "Waste No Time" | 2025 | 23 | Waste No Time |
| "Glow" | 2026 | 19 | Glow |

=== Japanese singles ===
List of Japanese singles, showing year released, selected chart positions, and name of the album
| Title | Year | Peak chart positions | Sales | Album |
| Title | Year | JPN | Sales | Album |
|---|---|---|---|---|
| "High Beam" | 2026 | 20 | JPN: 4,077 (phy.) | Non-album single |

=== Other charted songs ===
List of other charted songs, showing year released, selected chart positions, and name of the album
| Title | Year | Peak chart positions | Album |
| Title | Year | KOR Down. | Album |
|---|---|---|---|
| "Heavenly Blue" | 2025 | 143 | Waste No Time |

== Filmography ==
=== Television shows ===
Television shows appearances
| Year | Title | Role | Notes | Ref. |
|---|---|---|---|---|
| 2022–2023 | Welcome to NCT Universe | Himself | Ten episodes | |
| 2023 | Show! Music Core | Co-host | Episode 830 with Eunseok and Sullyoon | |

== Awards and nominations ==
Name of the award ceremony, year presented, award category, nominee(s) of the award, and the result of the nomination
| Award ceremony | Year | Category | Nominee / work | Result | Ref. |
|---|---|---|---|---|---|
| Hanteo Music Awards | 2025 | Rookie of the Year | XngHan & Soul | Nominated | |
