= SM Classics =

Music label

- Parent company: SM Entertainment
- Founded: 2020; 6 years ago
- Genre: Classical
- Country of origin: South Korea
- Official website: smtown.com/production/sm-classics

SM Classics (Korean: 에스엠 클래식스) is a South Korean classical music label under SM Entertainment. It was established in June 2020 through the memorandum of understanding signed by SM and the Seoul Philharmonic Orchestra. The label will release songs of SM arranged in orchestral arrangement through the mutual cooperation and presentation of differentiated content beyond genres.

== History ==
On June 10, 2020, SM Entertainment and the Seoul Philharmonic Orchestra signed a memorandum of understanding (MoU) at the orchestra's practice room in Jongno-gu, Seoul. The MoU will focus on "expanding and developing" cultural content through collaboration between genres. Lee Sung-soo, the chief executive officer of SM, and Kang Eun-kyung, the CEO of Seoul Philharmonic Orchestra, attended the signing ceremony. The two companies will release the "newly arranged and played songs" of SM, which were "loved" by the public as the first project, through SM Station in early July. Additionally, it is the first time for Seoul Philharmonic Orchestra to release K-pop music and is expected to give a "different charm".

The MoU is the first of its kind in Korea to be joined by a "leading" K-pop entertainment company and a K-Classic orchestra. It was reported that SM and Seoul Philharmonic Orchestra is expected to lead the development of Korean cultural content, by informing the world of the "excellence of K-pop and K-Classic", through mutual cooperation and presenting differentiated content beyond genres. Previously, SM has received favorable reviews by releasing a wide range of genres created by colorful collaboration through its digital music open channel Station since 2016. It will introduce a "variety of content convergence" that extends to the classical music genre by establishing the classical label SM Classics. Red Flavor by Red Velvet was the first song arranged through orchestral arrangement of song and film music director Park In-young with performance of the orchestra.

== Artists ==
- SM Classics Town Orchestra

== Discography ==
=== 2016 ===
Released	Title	Artist	Type	Format	Language	Ref.
April 1	"Regrets and Resolutions"	Moon Jung-jae & Kim Il-ji	Digital single	Download	—N/a	
December 23	"Have Yourself a Merry Little Christmas"	Wendy, Moon Jung-jae, Lee Nile	Digital single	Download	English	

=== 2018 ===
Released	Title	Artist	Type	Format	Language	Ref.
February 2	"Nikolai Kapustin: Piano Quintet No.1 – 1st Mov. Allegro"	Moon Jung-jae & Pace	Digital single	Download	—N/a	

=== 2020 ===
Released	Title	Artist	Type	Format	Language	Ref.
July 17	"Red Flavor" (Orchestra version)	Seoul Philharmonic Orchestra & Park In-young	Digital single	Download	—N/a	
July 24	"End of a Day" (Orchestra version)	Seoul Philharmonic Orchestra & Park In-young	Digital single	Download	—N/a	
August 28	"Tree" (Orchestra version)	SM Classics Town Orchestra	Digital single	Download	—N/a	

=== 2021 ===
Released	Title	Artist	Type	Format	Language	Ref.
August 12	"Make a Wish (Birthday Song)" (Orchestra version)	SM Classics Town Orchestra	Digital single	Download	—N/a	
November 26	"The Promise of H.O.T." (Jazz version)	Yohan Kim, Hogyu "Stiger" Hwang	Digital single	Download	—N/a	

=== 2022 ===
Released	Title	Artist	Type	Format	Language	Ref.
July 1	"Feel My Rhythm" (Orchestra version)	Seoul Philharmonic Orchestra	Digital single	Download	—N/a	
September 30	"Black Mamba" (Orchestra version)	Seoul Philharmonic Orchestra	Digital single	Download	—N/a	
December 26	"Welcome to SMCU Palace"	SM Classics Town Orchestra	Digital single	Download	—N/a	

=== 2025 ===
Released	Title	Artist	Type	Format	Language	Ref.
November 10	Pink Note	SM Jazz Trio	Studio album	CD; download	—N/a	
