= Siren (Riize song) =

Single by Riize

from the EP Riizing
- Language: Korean; English
- Released: April 3, 2024
- Studio: SM Yellow Tail; SM Aube
- Genre: Hip-hop
- Length: 2:27
- Label: SM; Kakao; RCA
- Composers: Benjamin 55; Young Chance; Xydo
- Lyricists: Benjamin 55; Young Chance; Xydo; Bang Hye-Hyun

Riize singles chronology
"Love 119" (2024)	"Siren" (2024)	"Impossible" (2024)

Music video
- "Siren (Performance Video)" on YouTube

"Siren" is a song recorded by South Korean boy band Riize. Originally released in shortened form on August 6, 2023, and the full version of the song was later released on April 3, 2024, as the third single and second track from the group's EP Riizing. It was released by SM Entertainment and distributed by Kakao Entertainment and RCA Records. The full version of the song was re-recorded without the participation of member Seunghan, who was on hiatus from the group at the time of its release and departed the group in October 2024.

== Background and release ==
In May 2023, it was confirmed by SM Entertainment that they would be debuting a new boy group in the second half of 2023, which would later become Riize. On August 7, SM officially announced the details of the group's debut, and shared a video of the group performing a shortened version of "Siren" onto their official YouTube channel. The song was not included on the group's debut single album Get a Guitar, and was not released onto any digital download or streaming platforms at the time, despite frequent fan requests that the song receive an official release.

On March 5, 2024, SM announced that Riize would embark on the Riizing Day tour in May, and that the group would be releasing a new single and EP in the second quarter of 2024. On April 3, the Riizing EP was officially announced, with SM stating that the group would be releasing a full-length version of "Siren" at noon that same day. The song would later be included as the second track on the EP.

== Composition ==
"Siren"
"Siren" is a hip-hop song with boom-bap style drums and bass riffs.

"Siren" was written and composed by Benjamin 55, Young Chance and Xydo, with Benjamin 55 also handling arrangement. The song's Korean lyrics were written by Bang Hye-Hyun. The originally released version runs one minute seventeen seconds; the full version runs two minutes twenty-seven seconds. The song was composed in the key of C-sharp major, with a tempo of 105 beats per minute.

The track has been characterized as a 90s-style hip-hop song with boom bap-style drums and strong bass riffs. The song also includes a scratching section in the bridge. Lyrically, the group declares they're "back with the new generation", a call out to the then-fledging fifth-generation of K-pop idol groups that Riize is a part of.

== Reception ==
"Siren" received a warm reception from critics, who felt it was a bold introduction for the group. Isabella Wandermurem for Clash called the song "electrifying", and felt the track was delivered with "drive and charisma". For The Honey Pop, writer Joanna Rose opined that the song's "allure was undeniable", and that it is "a testament to Riize's distinct musical style".

The difficulty level of the song's choreography was also noted by critics, with Nylon awarding the song "Most Un-TikTokable Choreography" in its 2023 best-of list, stating that the group "is clearly composed of members with impeccable dance skills and spry, young knee joints."

Upon the full song's release in 2024, the track drew criticism from fans due to the exclusion of member Seunghan, who was on hiatus from the group at the time. Seunghan sang in the original 2023 release of the song, but his vocals were removed from the extended version and dubbed by other members of the group.

== Performance video ==
A performance video for the original abbreviated version of "Siren" was released simultaneously with the song on August 6, 2023. It was directed by Jinooya Makes, who also directed the band's music videos for "Get a Guitar" and "Memories", which were shot consecutively with "Siren" in Los Angeles in July 2023 over a period of five days. The video sees the group performing the song's choreography in the lobby of the Los Angeles Theatre, a 1930s-era movie palace in Downtown Los Angeles.

== Credits and personnel ==
Credits adapted from the Riizing liner notes.

Studio

- SM Yellow Tail Studio - recording, digital editing
- SM Aube Studio - recording
- SM Wavelet Studio - digital editing
- 77F Studio - digital editing
- SM Blue Cup Studio - mixing
- Sterling Sound – mastering

Personnel

- SM Entertainment – executive producer
- Jang Cheol-hyuk – executive supervisor
- Riize – vocals
- Benjamin 55 - lyrics, composition, arrangement, background vocals
- Young Chance - lyrics, composition, vocal direction, background vocals
- Xydo - lyrics, composition, background vocals
- Bang Hye-Hyun - Korean lyrics
- Emess - scratching
- Noh Min-ji - recording, digital editing
- Kang Eun-ji - recording, digital editing
- Woo Min-jeong - digital editing
- Jeong Ui-seok - mixing
- Chris Gehringer – mastering

== Charts ==
=== Weekly charts ===
Weekly chart performance for "Siren"
Chart (2024)	Peak position
Japan Download Songs (Billboard Japan)	44
South Korea (Circle)	21

=== Monthly charts ===
Monthly chart performance for "Siren"
Chart (2024)	Position
South Korea (Circle)	26

=== Year-end charts ===
Year-end chart performance for "Siren"
Chart (2024)	Position
South Korea (Circle)	119

== Release history ==
Release history for "Impossible"
Region	Date	Format	Label
Various	April 3, 2024	Digital download; streaming	SM; Kakao
