= Mytro =

Upcoming South Korean boy band

- Origin: South Korea
- Genres: Trot
- Years active: 2024–2025
- Labels: SM; YamYam
- Members: Han Tey; Jung Yoon-jae; Shohei; Lim Chae-pyeong; Seo Woo-hyeok

Mytro (Korean: 마이트로; RR: Maiteuro; stylized in all caps) is a South Korean trot boy band formed by SM Entertainment and TV Chosun. The group consists of five members: Han Tey, Jung Yoon-jae, Shohei, Lim Chae-pyeong, and Seo Woo-hyeok. Prior to their debut, the band starred in Falling for a Trot-dol: Lovestruck Noonas [ko] (2024), a reality and variety show chronicling their debut preparations. The band originally would make their debut in February 2025, but scrapped as of May.

== History ==
=== 2024–present: Formation and pre-debut ===
On August 12, 2024, SM Entertainment and TV Chosun announced that they had engaged in a partnership for a trot idol project, with the group tentatively named "T-5". At that time it was announced that the group would consist of five members, including an actor, a previous contestant from Mr. Trot, and a K-pop trainee, and that the group would be produced by Cho Young-soo, known for his work on TV Chosun's Miss Trot and Mr. Trot. Additionally, it was announced that group's formation will be documented in a TV Chosun reality show which would begin airing in Korea and Japan that October.

The group's name was revealed to be "Mytro" and its members were officially announced on September 13 in a TV Chosun special titled Prelude to Love. Mytro's five members were revealed to be Han Tey, a former member of the boy band Mr.Mr; Jung Yoon-jae, a former actor; Shohei, a member of SM's training team SM Rookies; Lim Chae-pyeong, a previous contestant on the second season of Mr. Trot; and Seo Woo-hyeok, a former actor.

==== Falling for a Trot-dol: Lovestruck Noonas ====
On September 25, the SM C&C-produced show Falling for a Trot-dol: Lovestruck Noonas [ko] was announced to begin airing on TV Chosun on October 5, and follows the group through their debut preparations. The show consists of a group of women (Lee Young-ja, Song Eun-i, and Kim Sook, collectively the "noonas") who act as fangirls, providing commentary while they watch behind-the-scenes footage of Mytro preparing for their debut. The band performs for the noonas at least once per episode.

Ep.	Air date	Summary	Performance	Ref.
1	October 5, 2024	Mytro meets the noonas for the first time. The noonas learn about the process of Mytro's debut. The group has their first vocal lesson with trot legends Moon Hee-ok, Lee Ae-ran and Yoo Soo-hyun. In the vocal lesson, Tey and Chae-pyeong are praised, but Shohei stands out and is named "the treasure of the team". Woo-hyeok and Yoon-jae, who are new to singing, receive one-on-one vocal lessons. In dance class, Woo-hyeok, Yoon-jae and Chae-pyeong struggle with dancing, but shows improvement after learning from Tey and Shohei. Woo-hyeok injures his foot.	"Nest" (둥지) (Original by Nam Jin)	
2	October 12, 2024	The noonas reflect on Mytro's performance of "Nest" from the previous episode, and express excitement over the band's choreography and skill. The group enters and performs a dance cover of TWS's song "Plot Twist". After the performance, the noonas watch footage of the band worrying over learning the "Plot Twist"'s choreography. Under Shohei's leadership, the members practice the choreography over the course of a week. Later in the week, Shohei collapses during practice complaining of back pain, later being diagnosed with a herniated disc. Producer Cho Young-soo threatens to replace any members who don't meet his standards, sending worries through the band. Shohei performs "Waterwheel" by Kim Ji-ae, and is praised for his pronunciation, elegant dance lines and strong teamwork.	"Waterwheel" (물레야; Shohei solo) (Original by Kim Ji-ae)	
3	October 19, 2024	Tey performs "Oh, My Dear" by Jung Sui-song. The noonas praise the performance, and applaud Han Tey's emotional delivery and vocals. After the performance, the noonas watch behind-the-scenes footage of the performance's preparation. Han Tey visits his father's hospital room, and reveals he chose the song because the lyrics reminded him of his father. In the practice room, Han Tey discusses how he almost had to give up his dream after injuring his vocal cords, but was able to regain his ability to sing with intense practice and rehabilitation. Cho Young-soo summons the band to Jeju Island, where he reveals that he has decided to produce the band's first original song, a Latin-influenced song titled "Bomb Bomb Bomb". The group listens to the demo track and gives it positive reviews.	"Oh, My Dear" (님이여; Han Tey solo) (Original by Jung Eui-song)	
4	October 26, 2024	The noonas watch Mytro in the studio recording their first original song, "Bomb Bomb Bomb". The members nervously enter the recording studio while producer Cho Young-soo directs them. Cho discusses how he decided who would record which parts of the song, indicating that they were designed to bring out each member's individual charms. When Woo-hyeok, who is recording for the first time, is revealed to struggle in the studio, Cho leaves the studio in frustration. The group is shown learning the song's choreography.	"Whisky on the Rock" (Jung Yoon-jae solo) (Original by Choi Sung-soo)	
5	November 2, 2024	The noonas meet Cho Young-soo and prepare to watch Mytro perform "Bomb Bomb Bomb" for the first time. The band performs the song to rave reviews from the noonas. After the performance, the band attends a full course Korean beef party organized by Lee Young-ja, in celebration of their performance. The members perform an impromptu piano version of "Bomb Bomb Bomb" with Cho Young-soo. Mytro teaches the noonas how to do the song and dance of "Bomb Bomb Bomb" so they can sing along and do TikTok challenges.	"Bomb Bomb Bomb" (밤밤밤) (Original song)	
6	November 9, 2024	Mytro holds a variety show masterclass with the noonas. The noonas dream of a bright future for the Mytro members and provide the members words of guidance as entertainment imdustry experts. Lee Young-ja, who has been in the industry for 34 years, imparts wisdom on the members. The group plays various variety show activities with the noonas. Seo Woo-hyuk discusses his transition froom actor to singer. Lim Chae-pyeong prepares for his solo performance, shedding tears while regretting that he has never received vocal lessons. He discusses how he couldn't move his mouth previously due to tooth issues. After previously receiving feedback that he was weak with expressing emotions during his vocal lessons, he practices his expressions, gestures, and eye contact. Seo Woo-hyeok, an actor, helps Chae-pyeong with his emotional expression. Chae-pyeong performs Jo Hang-jo's "Truly" and draws an enthusiastic response from the noonas for his natural performance end eye contact.	"Truly" (정녕; Lim Chae-pyeong solo) (Original by Joo Hang-jo)	
7	November 16, 2024	Seo Woo-hyeok discusses the hardships of learning singing and dancing for the first time in his life. He chooses Nam Jin's "Empty Glass" for his solo performance, using his background as an actor to deliver emotional expressions, which the noonas enjoy. Lee Young-ja brings up Song Eun-i and Kim Sook's 30-year friendship, discussing the dating rumours between the two.	"Empty Glass" (빈잔; Seo Woo-hyeok solo) (Original by Nam Jin)	
8	November 23, 2024	Mytro receives their second original song, "Life Goes On", a song that was created by an SM Entertainment songwriting camp. The group meets with Kangta, who participated in the song's composition, and Tony Ahn, both being members of H.O.T., SM's first idol group. Mytro learns lessons from their senior boy group about idol life, with Kangta discussing how there were only four employees at SM Entertainment when they debuted in 1996 and there wasn't even a mirror in the practice room. The group is shown practicing and recording "Life Goes On" and performs the song while clips of their journey are shown.	"Life Goes On" (어렵다) (Original song)	
9	November 30, 2024	In the series finale, Mytro holds a concert for 100 fans, including their families, the noonas, and fans from Japan and China. The group performs their third original song, an uptempo song called "Love Hate", to enthusiastic cheers from the audience. The group discusses their journey over the past 9 weeks, with Jung Yoon-jae answering "yes" without hesitation when asked if the process was difficult. Lim Chae-pyeong is named the "MVP" of the group by the noonas. The group also performs "Nest", previously performed on Episode 1, and Lim Chae-pyeong performs "If My Mother Comes to My Dream", bringing the noonas and his mother to tears. The group's parents express their feelings towards their children's performances and their career thus far. After performing "Life Goes On", the group announces that their official debut will occur in February 2025. The group takes a commemorative photo with the audience, and then closes the show with a performance of "Bomb Bomb Bomb". After chants for an encore, the group returns to perform "Love Hate" once again.	"Love Hate" (사랑이 미워) (Original song); "Nest"; "If My Mother Comes to My Dream" (우리 어머니 내 꿈 찾아오면); Lim Chae-pyeong solo) (Original by Lee Bo-ram); "Life Goes On"; "Bomb Bomb Bomb"; "Love Hate" (encore)	

== Members ==
- Han Tey (한태이)
- Jung Yoon-jae (정윤재)
- Shohei (쇼헤이) – leader
- Lim Chae-pyeong (임채평)
- Seo Woo-hyeok (서우혁)

== Discography ==
=== Soundtrack appearances ===
List of soundtrack appearances, showing year released, and name of the album
Title	Year	Album
"Nest" (둥지)	2024	Lovestruck Sister Episode 1
"Waterwheel" (물레야) (Shohei solo)	2024	Lovestruck Sisters Episode 2
"Oh, My Dear" (님이여) (Han Tey solo)	2024	Lovestruck Sisters Episode 3
"Whisky on the Rock" (Jung Yoon-jae solo)	2024	Lovestruck Sisters Episode 4
"Bomb Bomb Bomb" (밤밤밤)	2024	Lovestruck Sisters Episode 5
"Truly" (정녕) (Lim Chae-pyeong solo)	2024	Lovestruck Sisters Episode 6
"Empty Glass" (빈잔) (Seo Woo-hyeok solo)	2024	Lovestruck Sisters Episode 7
"Life Goes On" (어렵다)	2024	Lovestruck Sisters Episode 8
"Love Hate" (사랑이 미워)	2024	Lovestruck Sisters Episode Final
"If My Mother Comes to My Dream" (우리 어머니 내 꿈 찾아오면) (Lim Chae-pyeong solo)	2024	Lovestruck Sisters Episode Final

== Filmography ==
=== Television shows ===
Year	Title	Notes	Ref.
2024	Prelude to Love	Member reveal special	
2024	Falling for a Trot-dol: Lovestruck Noonas [ko]	Pre-debut variety show	
