= Impossible (Riize song) =

Single by Riize

from the EP Riizing
- Language: Korean; English
- Released: April 18, 2024
- Studio: SM Big Shot; SM Dorii; SM Droplet
- Genre: Dance-pop; house
- Length: 3:02
- Label: SM; Kakao; RCA
- Composers: David Wilson; James Abrahart; Dewain Whitmore Jr.
- Lyricists: David Wilson; James Abrahart; Dewain Whitmore Jr.; Hwang Yu-bin

Riize singles chronology
"Siren" (2024)	"Impossible" (2024)	"Boom Boom Bass" (2024)

Music video
- "Impossible" on YouTube

"Impossible" is a song recorded by South Korean boy band Riize. It was released on April 18, 2024, through SM Entertainment and distributed by Kakao Entertainment and RCA Records, as the fourth single and later included as the third track on the group's EP Riizing.

== Background and release ==
On March 5, 2024, SM announced that Riize would embark on the Riizing Day tour in May, and that the group would be releasing a new singles and EP sometime between April and June 2024.

On April 3, 2024, SM announced that Riize would be releasing their first EP in June 2024. It was also announced that the single "Impossible" would be the fourth pre-released song of the group and was scheduled to be released on April 18. On April 15, SM released the music video preview and teaser on Riize's social media accounts which was shot at Lisbon, Portugal. On April 18, the single was released along with its music video.

== Composition ==
"Impossible"
"Impossible" is a house dance song with rhythmic house beats and mysterious synthesizer.

"Impossible" was written and composed by David Wilson, James Abrahart, and Dewain Whitmore Jr., with Wilson handling arrangement, and Hwang Yu-bin of songwriting collective XYXX contributing Korean-language lyrics.

The song is a house dance which stands out with its rhythmic house beats and mysterious synthesizer. The lyrics contain the message that even if everyone thinks it is impossible, the moment they move forward together toward the same dream, the impossible becomes possible, and that there is no longer anything impossible.

== Credits and personnel ==
Credits adapted from the EP's liner notes.

Studio

- SM Big Shot Studio - recording, engineered for mix
- SM Dorii Studio - recording
- SM Droplet Studio - recording
- 77F Studio / Imlay - digital editing
- SM Blue Ocean Studio - mixing
- Sterling Sound – mastering

Personnel

- SM Entertainment – executive producer
- Jang Cheol-hyuk – executive supervisor
- Riize – vocals
- David Wilson - lyrics, composition, arrangement
- James Abrahart - lyrics, composition, background vocals
- Dewain Whitmore Jr. - lyrics, composition
- Hwang Yu-bin (XYXX) - Korean lyrics
- Young Chance - background vocals
- Lee Min-gyu - recording, engineering
- Kim Joo-hyun - recording
- Jung Jae-won - recording
- Woo Min-jung - digital editing

== Charts ==
=== Weekly charts ===
Weekly chart performance for "Impossible"
Chart (2024)	Peak position
Global Excl. US (Billboard)	135
Japan (Japan Hot 100)	66
Japan Combined Singles (Oricon)	33
South Korea (Billboard)	15
South Korea (Circle)	26

=== Monthly charts ===
Monthly chart performance for "Impossible"
Chart (2024)	Position
South Korea (Circle)	40

=== Year-end charts ===
Year-end chart performance for "Impossible"
Chart (2024)	Position
South Korea (Circle)	133

== Release history ==
Release history for "Impossible"
Region	Date	Format	Label
Various	April 18, 2024	Digital download; streaming	SM; Kakao
