= Fly Up =

2025 single by Riize

Single by Riize

from the album Odyssey
- Language: Korean; English
- Released: May 19, 2025
- Studio: SM Yellow Tail Studio
- Genre: Pop rock; dance
- Length: 2:58
- Label: SM; Kakao; RCA
- Composers: Stian Nyhammer Olsen; Julia Bognar Finnseter; Jop Pangemanan; Albin Tengblad; Jacob Aaron
- Lyricists: Hwang Yoo-bin; Deepflow
- Producer: Stian Nyhammer Olsen

Riize singles chronology
"Hug" (2025)	"Fly Up" (2025)	"Fame" (2025)

Music video
- "Fly Up" on YouTube

"Fly Up" is a song recorded by South Korean boy band Riize. It was released on May 19, 2025, through SM Entertainment and distributed by Kakao Entertainment and RCA Records, as the lead single of their first studio album, Odyssey.

== Background and release ==
On April 28, 2025, it was announced that Riize would release their first studio album titled Odyssey on May 19. The lead single "Fly Up" was announced on the next day on April 29.

"Fly Up" was first previewed on May 14, 2025, as part of the premiere of a full-length video featuring all ten songs from the album, which was released via Weverse. The song and its music video were released alongside the album on May 19 on digital music platforms.

== Composition ==
Lyrics for "Fly Up" were written by Hwang Yoo-bin and Deepflow. Stian Nyhammer Olsen, Julia Bognar Finnseter, Jop Pangemanan, Albin Tengblad, and Jacob Aaron made additional contributions to composition. The song is described as a vibrant dance track that draws inspiration from the rock and roll style of the 1950s. The lyrics illustrate how the six members of Riize gradually come together and find joy through shared experiences with people from all walks of life.

== Accolades ==
On South Korean music programs, "Fly Up" won four first-place trophies.

Music program awards for "Fly Up"
Program	Date	Ref.
Show Champion	May 28, 2025	
Music Bank	May 30, 2025	
Show! Music Core	May 31, 2025	
Inkigayo	June 1, 2025	

== Credits and personnel ==
Credits adapted from the Odyssey liner notes.

Studio

- SM Yellow Tail Studio – recording, digital editing, engineered for mix
- SM Concert Hall Studio – mixing
- Sterling Sound – mastering

Personnel

- SM Entertainment – executive producer
- Riize – vocals
- Hwang Yoo-bin – lyrics
- Deepflow – lyrics
- Jacob Aaron – composition, background vocals
- Stian Nyhammer Olsen – producer, composition, arrangement
- Julia Bognar Finnseter – composition, background vocals
- Jop Pangemanan – composition, background vocals
- G-High – vocal directing
- Andrew Choi – background vocals
- Jsong – background vocals
- Noh Min-ji – recording, digital editing, engineered for mix
- Nam Koong-jin – mixing
- Randy Merrill – mastering

== Charts ==
=== Weekly charts ===
Weekly chart performance for "Fly Up"
Chart (2025)	Peak position
Japan (Japan Hot 100)	85
South Korea (Circle)	8
UK Singles Downloads (Official Charts)	99

=== Monthly charts ===
Monthly chart performance for "Fly Up"
Chart (2025)	Position
South Korea (Circle)	57

=== Year-end charts ===
Year-end chart performance for "Fly Up"
Chart (2025)	Position
South Korea (Circle)	167

== Release history ==
Release history for "Fly Up"
Region	Date	Format	Label
Various	May 19, 2025	Digital download; streaming	SM; Kakao

== See also ==
- List of Inkigayo Chart winners (2025)
- List of Music Bank Chart winners (2025)
- List of Show Champion Chart winners (2025)
- List of Show! Music Core Chart winners (2025)
