= Riizing =

- Digital cover

EP by Riize
- Released: June 17, 2024
- Studio: Doobdoob (Seoul); SM Aube (Seoul); SM Big Shot (Seoul); SM Dorii (Seoul); SM Droplet (Seoul); SM LVYIN (Seoul); SM SSAM (Seoul); SM Wavelet (Seoul); SM Yellow Tail (Seoul)
- Genre: K-pop
- Length: 23:30
- Language: Korean; English
- Label: SM; Kakao; RCA

Riize chronology
Get a Guitar (2023)	Riizing (2024)	Odyssey (2025)

Singles from Riizing
- 1. "Talk Saxy" Released: October 27, 2023; 2. "Love 119" Released: January 5, 2024; 3. "Siren" Released: April 3, 2024; 4. "Impossible" Released: April 18, 2024; 5. "Boom Boom Bass" Released: June 17, 2024

Repackage edition cover
- Digital cover

Singles from Riizing: Epilogue
- 1. "Combo" Released: September 4, 2024

Riizing is the first extended play by South Korean boy band Riize. Released on June 17, 2024 by SM Entertainment through Kakao Entertainment, the EP consists of eight tracks, including the lead single "Boom Boom Bass" and pre-released singles "Talk Saxy", "Love 119", "Siren" and "Impossible". On September 4, 2024, the special repackage version of their EP titled Riizing: Epilogue was released with the addition of the single "Combo" to commemorate the group's first anniversary.

== Background and release ==
=== Riizing ===
On March 5, 2024, SM Entertainment announced that Riize would kick off their Riizing Day Fan-Con Tour in May 2024 and release a mini-album in the second quarter of the year. On April 3, 2024, Riize posted a "Real-time Oddysey" schedule poster revealing the release date of their first EP Riizing, pre-release singles, album promotions and further activities. On April 3 and 18, the group released the tracks "Siren" and "Impossible" as pre-release digital singles, accompanied by music videos. On April 29, Riize released three more tracks on streaming services: "Honestly", "9 Days" and "One Kiss". On June 4, 2024, the group released a remix version of "Impossible" produced by French DJ Darius. The EP was officially released on June 17, 2024, along with the lead single "Boom Boom Bass" and its music video.

=== Riizing: Epilogue ===
On September 2, 2024, SM announced that Riize would be releasing their first repackage EP Riizing: Epilogue on September 4, 2024, along with its lead single "Combo". This date also marks the group's first debut anniversary.

== Composition ==
The EP Riizing, described as an "emotional-pop album", opens with the title track "Boom Boom Bass", a dance-pop song featuring a "funky disco beat", "groovy bass lines", and lyrics about "youth freely expressing their excitement for each other by playing the bass guitar". The second track, "Siren", incorporates 90's hip-hop elements like "boom bap drums" and "strong bass riffs". The third track, "Impossible", features "rhythmic house beats" and "mysterious synthesizers", with lyrics suggesting that "anything is possible when pursued collectively". The fourth track, "9 Days", is a dance song characterized by "energetic synthesizers and drums", and "infectious melodies", convey that "weeks feel like nine days, but they (Riize) keep pursuing their dreams". The fifth track, "Honestly", is an R&B-pop song combining "dreamy synth pads", "trap drum beats" and "soothing vocals". The sixth track, "One Kiss", is a mid-tempo song featuring "majestic strings" and "powerful drums". The album closes with previously released singles "Talk Saxy" and "Love 119"; "Talk Saxy" features saxophone riffs and 808 bass, while "Love 119" incorporates "sweet piano riffs" and samples "Emergency Room" by South Korean band Izi.

== Promotion ==
The EP was promoted by the group with the Riizing Day concert tour, which held 31 shows in 19 cities across Asia and North America. All songs on the EP were included in the setlist.

== Commercial performance ==
Riizing debuted at number 2 on South Korea's Circle Album Chart in the chart issue dated June 16–22, 2024, with 1,070,823 copies sold.

== Track listing ==
Riizing track listing
No.	Title	Lyrics	Music	Arrangement	Length
1.	"Boom Boom Bass"	Peter Wallevik; Daniel Davidsen; Ben Samama; David Arkwright; Kil Jeong-jin; ChaMane	Wallevik; Davidsen; Samama; Arkwright	PhD	2:32
2.	"Siren"	Benjamin 55; Young Chance; Xydo; Bang Hye-Hyun	Benjamin 55; Young Chance; Xydo	Benjamin 55	2:27
3.	"Impossible"	David Wilson; James Abrahart; Dewain Whitmore Jr.; Hwang Yu-bin (XYXX)	Wilson; Abrahart; Whitmore	Dwilly	3:02
4.	"9 Days"	Bang Hye-hyun	August Rigo; Bang; Nick Kandler; Madeindvn; Jin Chan	Rigo; Bang; Kandler; Madeindvn; Chan	2:40
5.	"Honestly"	Park Ji-hyun (Artiffect)	Celine Svanbäck Mortensen; Rasmus Gregersen; Daecolm Diego Holland; Cutfather; Luisa Rolander	Gregersen; Mich Hansen	3:14
6.	"One Kiss"	Jo Yoon-kyung	Daniel Caesar; Simon Janlov	Caesar; Janlov	3:32
7.	"Talk Saxy"	Brice Fox; Tony Ferrari; Jurek Reunamäki; Danke	Fox; Ferrari; Reunamäki; Samuil (Decade +); Tay Jasper; Adrian McKinnon	Jurek; Benjamin 55	3:10
8.	"Love 119"	Jason Hahs; Colin Magalong; David Wilson; MZMC; Jeong Da-seul; ChaMane; Moon Seol-lee; Jo Yoon-kyung	Hahs; Magalong; Wilson; MZMC	Dwilly; MZMC	2:53
Total length:					23:30

Riizing: Epilogue bonus track
No.	Title	Lyrics	Music	Arrangement	Length
1.	"Combo"	Kenzie	Kenzie; Ronny Svendsen; Adrian Thesen; Anne Judith Wik; Bobii Lewis	Kenzie; Svendsen; Pizzapunk	3:39
Total length:					27:10

=== Notes ===
- "Love 119" contains sampled elements from "Emergency Room" (2005), as written and composed by Shin Dong-woo, and performed by Izi.

== Charts ==
=== Weekly charts ===
Weekly chart performance for Riizing
Chart (2024)	Peak position
Belgian Albums (Ultratop Flanders)	87
Japanese Albums (Oricon)	1
Japanese Combined Albums (Oricon)	1
Japanese Hot Albums (Billboard Japan)	1
South Korean Albums (Circle)	2
US Heatseekers Albums (Billboard)	5
US Top Album Sales (Billboard)	11
US World Albums (Billboard)	5

Weekly chart performance for Riizing: Epilogue
Chart (2024)	Peak position
Japanese Albums (Oricon)	2
Japanese Combined Albums (Oricon)	2
Japanese Hot Albums (Billboard Japan)	3
South Korean Albums (Circle)	1

=== Monthly charts ===
Monthly chart performance for Riizing
Chart (2024)	Peak position
Japanese Albums (Oricon)	9
South Korean Albums (Circle)	1

Monthly chart performance for Riizing: Epilogue
Chart (2024)	Peak position
Japanese Albums (Oricon)	6
South Korean Albums (Circle)	7

=== Year-end charts ===
Year-end chart performance for Riizing
Chart (2024)	Position
Japanese Albums (Oricon)	42
South Korean Albums (Circle)	21

Year-end chart performance for Riizing: Epilogue
Chart (2024)	Position
South Korean Albums (Circle)	76

== Certifications ==
Certifications for Riizing
Region	Certification	Certified units/sales
South Korea (KMCA)	Million	1,000,000^{^}
^{^} Shipments figures based on certification alone.

Certifications for Riizing: Epilogue
Region	Certification	Certified units/sales
South Korea (KMCA)	Platinum	250,000^{^}
^{^} Shipments figures based on certification alone.

== Release history ==
Release history for Riizing
Region	Date	Format	Version	Label
South Korea	June 17, 2024	CD	Standard	SM; Kakao
Various	June 17, 2024	Digital download; streaming	Standard	SM; Kakao
Japan	July 7, 2024	CD	Standard	SM; Universal Japan
Various	September 4, 2024	Digital download; streaming	Reissue	SM; Kakao
South Korea	September 19, 2024	CD	Reissue	SM; Kakao
Japan	October 19, 2024	CD	Reissue	SM; Universal Japan
