= Get a Guitar (song) =

- English version cover

Single by Riize

from the album Get a Guitar
- Language: Korean; English
- Released: September 4, 2023
- Studio: SM Big Shot (Seoul); SM Yellow Tail (Seoul); Doobdoob (Seoul); Sound Pool (Seoul)
- Genre: Dance
- Length: 2:40
- Label: SM; Kakao; RCA
- Composers: Peter Wallevik; Daniel Davidsen; Ben Samama; David Arkwright
- Lyricists: Peter Wallevik; Daniel Davidsen; David Arkwright; Ben Samama; Shin Na-ri (Note: Korean version only); Bang Hye-hyun; Sam Carter (Note: English version only)
- Producer: PhD

Riize singles chronology
"Memories" (2023)	"Get a Guitar" (2023)	"Talk Saxy" (2023)

Alternative cover
- Chromeo remixes cover

Music video
- "Get a Guitar" on YouTube "Get a Guitar" (Performance ver.) on YouTube "Get a Guitar" (Chromeo remix) on YouTube

"Get a Guitar" is a song recorded by South Korean boy band Riize. It was released on September 4, 2023, through SM Entertainment and distributed by Kakao Entertainment and RCA Records, as the second single and lead track of the group's debut single album of the same name. The song was a commercial success, peaking at number eleven on the Circle Digital Chart.

== Background and release ==
In May 2023 it was confirmed by SM Entertainment that they would be debuting a new boy band in the second half of 2023, which would later become Riize. On August 7, SM announced that Riize would be making their debut with the release of a single album, Get a Guitar. The track was first teased on August 21, with a small snippet being included at the end of the music video for the group's previous single "Memories". "Get a Guitar" was officially released concurrently with the single album on September 4, along with its music video.

In addition to its original Korean version, a version of the song recorded in English was released digitally on November 9. On December 14, a remix EP entitled iScreaM Vol. 28: Get a Guitar (Remixes) was released through SM's EDM imprint ScreaM, featuring a remix of "Get a Guitar" by Canadian electro-funk duo Chromeo in both Korean and English.

== Composition ==
"Get a Guitar"
A 16-second audio sample of "Get a Guitar", showcasing "groovy pop elements" and interpolation of the bassline from Queen's "Another One Bites the Dust.

As "Get a Guitar" is a song that marks the beginning of Riize, we worked on the song thinking of coming together and becoming one to the sound of the guitar. We also tried to capture the bright atmosphere while we were recording the song.

— Riize member Sungchan on the song's meaning, Earmilk

The Korean lyrics for "Get a Guitar" were written by Shin Na-ri and Bang Hye-hyun, with Ben Samama and David Arkwright contributing to composition and lyrics, and Peter Wallevik and Daniel Davidsen participating in lyrics, composition and arrangement under production group "PhD". Additional lyrics for the English version of the song were written by Sam Carter. The track interpolates the bassline from the 1980 song "Another One Bites the Dust" as written by John Deacon and performed by Queen. Described as a dance song characterized by "upbeat instrumentation" with "groovy pop elements", layering guitars into a "retro funky dance track" to become "a slick, bubblegum earworm". The song's lyrics have been described as "easy going" and "carefree" about "love's playful twists and turns". "Get a Guitar" was composed in the key of C-sharp major, with a tempo of 110 beats per minute.

== Critical reception ==
"Get a Guitar" received a positive reception from music critics. Writing for NME, critic Carmen Chin noted that the song "feels like a breath of fresh air" and is "one of the year's standout debut tracks in the K-pop scene." Robin Murray, writing for Clash, characterized the song as "a crisp slice of pop bedlam" and "incredibly infectious".

The song has also been included in "Best Of" lists, including Billboard's "Best K-Pop Songs of 2023" at number 22, with critic Starr Bowenbank writing that the song "highlights the group's strength in the ever-changing landscape of K-pop". Writing for Grammy.com, Tássia Assis included the song on the list of "15 K-Pop Songs That Took 2023 By Storm".

== Music video ==
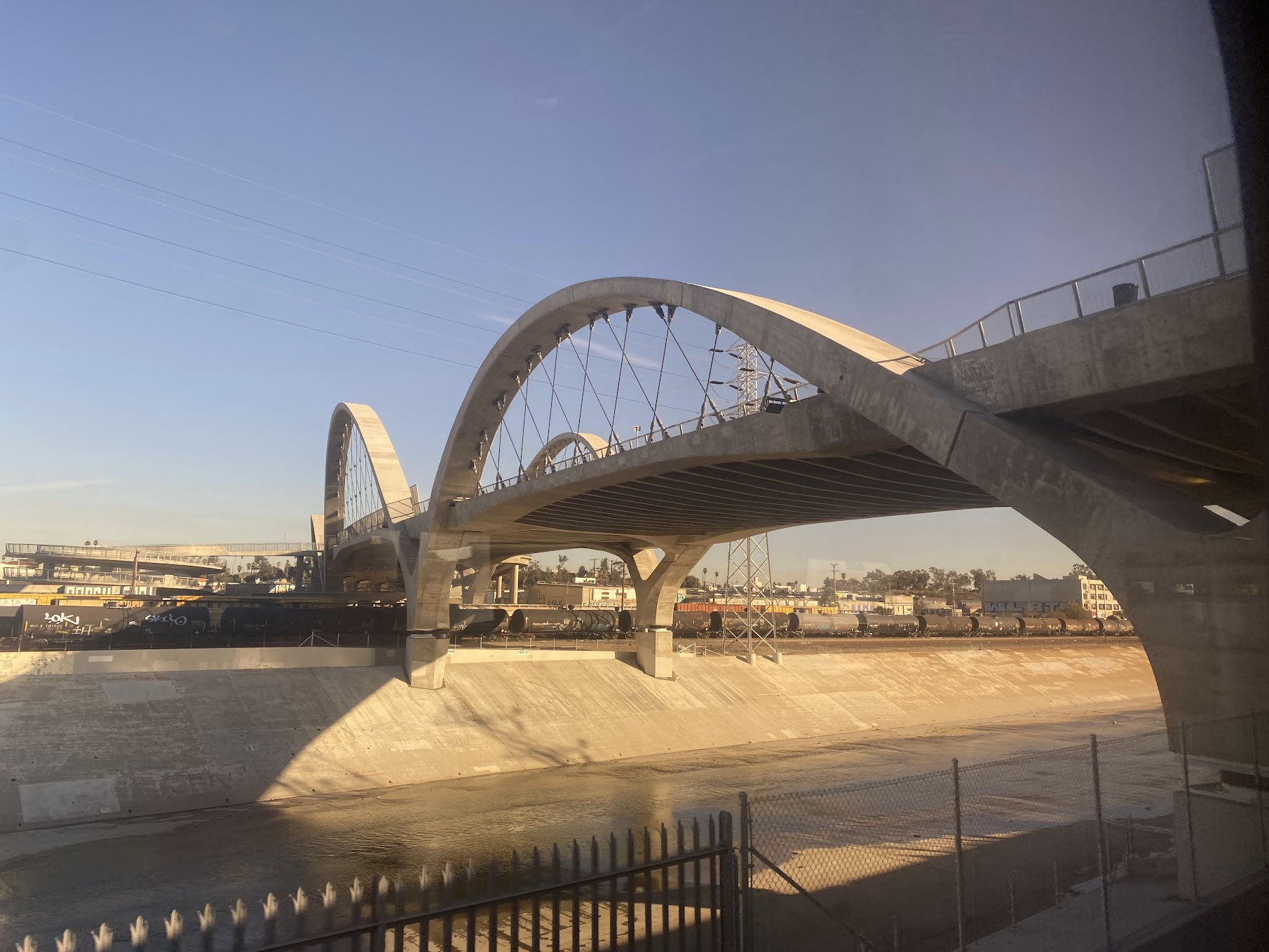
The Sixth Street Viaduct is featured prominently in the music video.

The music video for "Get a Guitar" was preceded by a 13-second long video teaser which was published to SM's official YouTube channel on August 31.

The "Get a Guitar" music video was released simultaneously with the song on September 4, premiering on SM's YouTube channel at 12:00 AM KST. It was directed by Jinooya Makes, who had previously directed the band's music videos for "Siren" and "Memories", which were shot consecutively with "Get a Guitar" in Los Angeles in July 2023 over a period of five days. The director would later collaborate with the band again on the music video for "Impossible" from their 2024 EP Riizing.

The video has been described as a "love letter to the city of Los Angeles" and prominently features the band dancing in several area landmarks such as the Sixth Street Viaduct and Los Angeles Theatre. In May 2024, the band was honoured with a certificate of appreciation from Los Angeles City Council for promoting the city in its music video.

=== Chromeo remix ===
A music video for the Chromeo remix of the song was first teased on December 13, and was released officially onto SM's official YouTube channel the next day. The computer-animated video was directed by Jiseon Kim and produced by Suess Studio. Styled in mock-claymation, the music video consists of the lead character travelling through different scenes while riding a guitar-shaped skateboard.

== Live performances ==
Following the release of "Get a Guitar", Riize performed on six South Korean music programs: Mnet's M Countdown on September 7, 14, and 21, KBS's Music Bank on September 8, 15, 22, MBC's Show! Music Core on September 9, 16, and 23, SBS's Inkigayo on September 10 and 17, SBS M's The Show on September 19, and MBC Plus's Show Champion on September 20

To further promote the song, the group also performed on Mnet's Studio Choom, MBC's It's Live, and The First Take.

Riize also performed the song at several music awards ceremonies, beginning with the 2023 The Fact Music Awards on October 10, 2023. At the 2023 Melon Music Awards on December 2, 2023, Riize performed the song with a live band, with member Wonbin performing a guitar solo introduction before being joined by the rest of the group. At the 33rd Seoul Music Awards on January 2, 2024, the band performed the song in a medley along with "Talk Saxy", and at the 13th Circle Chart Music Awards on January 10, the group included the song in a medley performance along with "Love 119."

The song was also included in the setlist of the group's 2024 Riizing Day concert tour.

== Track listing ==
- Digital download and streaming (iScreaM Vol. 28: Get a Guitar (Remixes))
1. "Get a Guitar" (Chromeo remix) – 2:47
2. "Get a Guitar" (English ver.) (Chromeo remix) – 2:47

== Credits and personnel ==
Credits adapted from the single album's liner notes and Naver.

Studio

- SM Big Shot Studio – recording, engineered for mix
- SM Yellow Tail Studio – recording
- Doobdoob Studio – recording
- Sound Pool Studio – recording
- SM Starlight Studio – digital editing
- 77F Studio – digital editing
- SM LVYIN Studio – engineered for mix
- SM Concert Hall Studio – mixing
- Sterling Sound – mastering

Personnel

- SM Entertainment – executive producer
- Jang Cheol-hyuk – executive supervisor
- Riize – vocals
  - Eunseok – background vocals
  - Seunghan – background vocals
  - Sohee – background vocals
- Peter Wallevik (PhD) – lyrics, producer, composition, arrangement
- Daniel Davidsen (PhD) – lyrics, producer, composition, arrangement
- Ben Samama – lyrics, composition, background vocals
- David Arkwright – lyrics, composition, background vocals
- Shin Na-ri (ARTiffect) – lyrics
- Bang Hye-hyun (Jam Factory) – lyrics
- Sam Carter – lyrics
- Jang Jin-young – vocal directing
- Ju Chan-yang (Pollen) – vocal directing, background vocals
- Lee Min-kyu – recording, engineered for mix
- Noh Min-ji – recording
- Eugene Kwon – recording
- Jeong Ho-jin – recording
- On Seong-yoon – recording
- Jeong Yoo-ra – digital editing
- Woo Min-jeong – digital editing
- Lee Ji-hong – engineered for mix
- Nam Koong-jin – mixing
- Chris Gehringer – mastering

== Charts ==
=== Weekly charts ===
Weekly chart performance for "Get a Guitar"
Chart (2023–2024)	Peak position
Japan (Japan Hot 100)	98
South Korea (Circle)	11

=== Monthly charts ===
Monthly chart performance for "Get a Guitar"
Chart (2024)	Position
South Korea (Circle)	15

=== Year-end charts ===
2023 year-end chart performance for "Get a Guitar"
Chart (2023)	Position
South Korea (Circle)	147
Chart (2024)	Position
South Korea (Circle)	46

== Certifications ==
Certifications for "Get a Guitar"
Region	Certification	Certified units/sales
Streaming
Japan (RIAJ)	Gold	50,000,000^{†}
^{†} Streaming-only figures based on certification alone.

== Release history ==
Release history for "Get a Guitar"
Region	Date	Format	Language	Version	Label
Various	September 4, 2023	Digital download; streaming	Korean	Original	SM; Kakao
Various	November 9, 2023	Digital download; streaming	English	Original	SM; RCA
Various	December 14, 2023	Digital download; streaming	Korean; English	Remixes	SM; ScreaM
