= Taste (Haechan album) =

2025 studio album by Haechan

- Digital cover

Studio album by Haechan
- Released: September 8, 2025
- Recorded: June–July 2025
- Studios: SM Azure (Seoul); SM Lvyin (Seoul); SM Big Shot (Seoul); SM Droplet (Seoul)
- Genres: R&B; soul
- Length: 32:37
- Languages: Korean; English
- Labels: SM; Kakao
- Producers: Deez; Yunsu; Coach & Sendo; August Rigo; 808Bhav808; Perklee; Young Chance; Frzm

Singles from Taste
- 1. "Crzy" Released: September 8, 2025

Taste is the debut studio album by South Korean singer Haechan. Supported by the single "Crzy", it was released on September 8, 2025, by SM Entertainment through Kakao Entertainment. With Taste, Haechan sought to share his musical preferences, branching out from the work he had produced as a member of K-pop boy group NCT since 2016.

Haechan began developing the album in 2024 mainly in collaboration with songwriter and producer Deez, with additional input from SM's artists and repertoire team. Taste is primarily an R&B and soul record that also incorporates elements of dance, pop, hip-hop, and funk music, with lyrics exploring love, attraction, separation, and the artist's aspirations and struggles. On the record, Haechan explored different styles of vocal delivery.

Haechan promoted Taste with performances on South Korean music shows and fan meetings in Japan. The album topped charts, sold over 400,000 copies, and received a platinum certification in South Korea, while it entered the top five in Japan. It received positive reviews, with praise for its cohesive R&B narrative and Haechan's vocal performance; Idology listed it among the best albums of the year. Taste earned nominations at the Melon Music Awards and the Korea Grand Music Awards.

== Background ==
South Korean singer Haechan began training under SM Entertainment in 2013 and composing songs on the piano a few years later, around the age of 15, initially with the goal of becoming a soloist. After debuting in 2016 in SM's K-pop idol boy group NCT and its sub-units NCT 127 and NCT Dream, he prioritized group activities and became uncertain about whether he would ever release a solo album. However, he envisioned a potential solo debut at the age of 25, feeling that he would be better prepared to execute it properly by then. Meanwhile, Haechan kept writing songs in his free time and began asking SM's artists and repertoire (A&R) division for spare demos that he could use to practice writing top lines. While developing NCT 127's third studio album, Neo Zone (2020), he began collaborating with Deez, a singer-songwriter working at SM known as the frontrunner of South Korea's neo soul wave. Rather than joining SM's official songwriting camps, they wrote songs together during their time off. While Haechan had always been influenced by pop and R&B singer-songwriter Michael Jackson, he credited Deez with inspiring him to make his own R&B music.

== Development ==
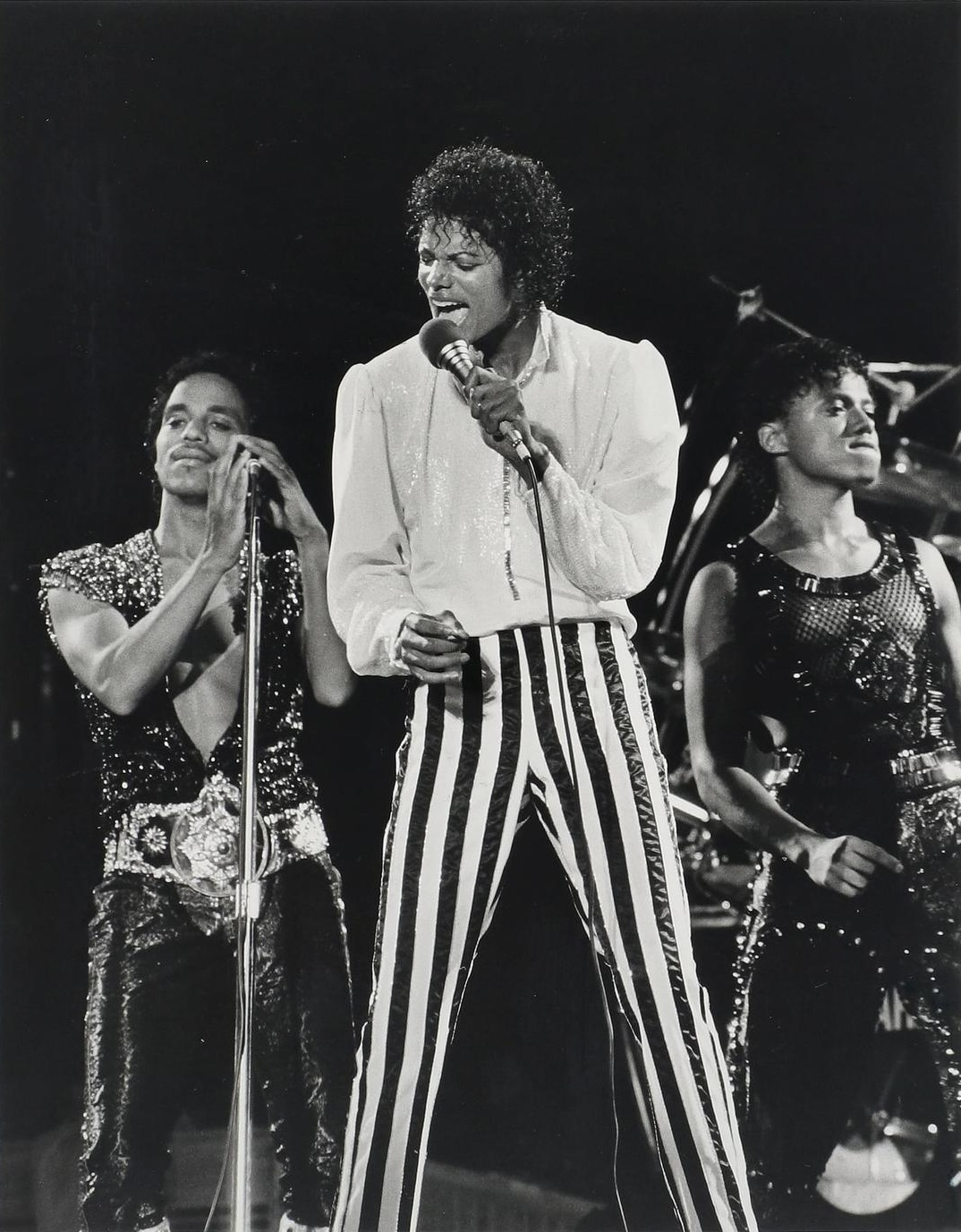
Haechan cited singer-songwriter and dancer Michael Jackson (center) as one of the main influences on Taste.

In 2024, Haechan informed SM of his decision to release a solo album and asked Deez to collaborate with him. His goal was to share his personal musical taste and create "good", enduring music, disregarding mainstream music. He officially began working with the A&R team to select the tracks at the end of 2024, listening to around 60-70 demos, most of which were created and sent to him by Deez. Specifically, he sought out an A&R team member who could offer a perspective that challenged his own. They focused on curating a diverse range of R&B songs and making the album's flow "natural yet dynamic".

Initially, Haechan planned to include songs that he had written with Deez, but later shifted his focus to selecting only what he felt were the best tracks, regardless of authorship. He submitted drafts of the lyrics for all tracks, but opted to select them through blind-bidding, (Note: "Blind-bidding" is a common practice at SM Entertainment where songs are selected without knowing the songwriter, with the goal of ensuring an unbiased choice.) resulting in him receiving a writing credit only on the song "Should Be". Despite early concerns from both him and the A&R team about the tracks' technical difficulty, Haechan ultimately picked mostly tracks considered vocally challenging for him. He said that Jackson's music influenced his selection of songs for the album.

Haechan received "Crzy" from Deez between May and June 2024 and immediately chose it as the lead single, feeling that the track played to his strengths and fit the vision that he had for his first stage as a soloist. With "Crzy", he wanted to move away from NCT 127's hip-hop sound to establish his own musical identity. The A&R team initially disagreed with his choice, fearing that a single musically tied to a specific era, the 2000s, wouldn't be the best move for his career. Haechan challenged them to bring him a more convincing single, but they ultimately agreed that "Crzy" would best showcase his skills in singing, rapping, and dancing, after briefly considering "Adrenaline" and "WYN?" instead.

Haechan then chose "Camera Lights" as the opener and selected "Love Beyond" and "Roll with Me" for their resemblance to Usher's "Good Kisser" and Jackson's "The Girl Is Mine" respectively. He wanted the album to feature an intermission, which Deez later suggested it be positioned to connect "Roll with Me" to "Talented", the latter being the track that had the strongest impact on Haechan upon first listen. Haechan also personally asked Deez for "Grey Rain", a track that Deez had first played for him in 2020. For "WYN?", he selected rapper Haon to feature on the track from a variety of artists suggested by the A&R team. Initially, he had also planned to include featuring artists on "Crzy" and another track, but ultimately decided against it. He said that he likely would not have featured anyone on "WYN?" as well, had he not already received the proposed verse from Haon and found it to be to his liking.

== Recording ==
External video
- Recording sessions for Taste

Between June–July 2025, Haechan worked with Deez as vocal director to record most of the tracks, finding Deez's style particularly suited to him. Deez challenged him to find a unique vocal identity, pushing him to move away from the tone that he had consistently used with NCT. He often altered the demos while recording to fit Haechan's style. Retrospectively, Haechan commented that, while the recording process was a struggle at times, he felt that he had improved more during the making of Taste than at any point since his debut with NCT. He noted that he had to compromise on certain tracks due to limited time and issues with his vocal condition.

Haechan anticipated that "Should Be" would be the most difficult to record, so he planned to record it last, once his voice was fully warmed up. Despite his preparation, the recording sessions for the song lasted overall more than 20 hours and left him voiceless for the next days. Similarly, he found "Love Beyond" particularly challenging as it was the first track that they tackled; when his usual technique failed, he requested the isolated stems for the first time in his career, studying it from the rhythm to the ad-libs. On "Camera Lights", he found the vocal dynamics demanding as he worked to balance its loose feel with sharp accents, particularly in the bridge, which required a glissando-like transition into a falsetto-leaning mixed voice.

For "Adrenaline", Deez prompted Haechan to explore new styles of delivery, leading to a grittier vocal performance. On "Talented", Haechan originally worked with a different director but chose to re-record it with Deez after being dissatisfied with the first result. Initially, he had struggled with the track's vocal dynamics and found it difficult to capture the emotions of the English demo when performing the final Korean lyrics in the studio. On "Grey Rain", he prioritized an emotional interpretation over technical precision. He found "Roll with Me" and "WYN?" to be the most effortless tracks to record, noting that his vocal delivery on the latter resembles the style that he uses with NCT.

== Composition ==
Taste has been described as an R&B and soul record, reminiscent of musical stylings spanning from the 1990s to the 2010s. Critic Kim Young-dae said that Taste eschewed the trendy R&B sounds of contemporary K-pop in favor of embracing earlier styles of R&B, as evidenced by the use of detailed melismas and the influences of Motown, Philadelphia soul, and early Chris Brown. The album's title refers to Haechan sharing his personal musical taste while giving fans a first taste of his identity as a soloist.

The record opens with "Camera Lights", a neo soul track that blends jazz piano and Philadelphia soul over a loose 4/4 drum rhythm, as Haechan starts humming a bass riff and sings about falling for someone's charm at the burst of a camera flash. Critics noted that "Camera Lights" serves to establish the album's themes and ambitions. Driven by an acoustic guitar, "Crzy" blends R&B, pop, and dance over an "ever-changing" hip-hop funky rhythm characteristic of the early 2000s. In it, Haechan sings and raps about the seductive "push and pull" of a chance encounter with a captivating stranger. IZM's Park Seung-min likened its production to that of the Neptunes on tracks such as Justin Timberlake's "Like I Love You" and N.E.R.D's "She Wants to Move".

The third track, "Adrenaline", reinterprets early 2000s club-tune hip-hop and R&B, blending digital synths with drums, bass, and distorted vocals, and features Haechan rap-singing about racing through the city at night. Based on a retro-funk sound, "Love Beyond" is an R&B track featuring a tight drum rhythm in which Haechan sings about the fragility of love amidst longing for a partner. "Roll with Me" is a soul song shaped by the trumpet, Rhodes piano, and drums in which Haechan sings about momentarily putting aside hardships to focus on the time shared with a partner. Kim Young-dae described the listening experience as akin to hearing Haechan interpret a song by Stevie Wonder. An intermission serves as a stylistic bridge between the soul of "Roll with Me" and the funk of "Talented", with a brief narration that announces Haechan's readiness to reveal his talents.

"Talented" is an electro-funk song featuring a swing rhythm and bass riff, conveying the ambition to captivate audiences with one's talent. "WYN?" is a hip-hop and R&B track featuring rap verses by Haon with lyrics that explore an intense attraction towards someone. A reinterpretation of 1990s R&B and slow jam, "Should Be" depicts the conflicting emotions of a breakup, expressed through Haechan's deepened tone. Idology remarked that the track provides a release from previous musical tension, focusing on the raw vocals. "Grey Rain" is a stripped-down alternative pop-R&B track driven by an acoustic guitar that deals with the emptiness hidden behind a glamorous and busy life, reflecting on moments of loneliness and healing. Taste concludes with an outro that features Haechan returning to the studio to prepare for recording while humming the melody of "Camera Lights".

== Release and promotion ==
On August 18, 2025, SM announced that Haechan would make his solo debut with the release of his first studio album, Taste, supported by the single "Crzy". Pre-orders were opened on the same day. The following day, SM released a schedule, designed to resemble concert tickets, illustrating images and videos that would be released to promote the album throughout August and September. Between August 26 and 28, SM released three sets of teaser images titled "bitter sweet", "savory", and "mild", respectively. Haechan also promoted the album on Instagram with a series of themed photos dominated by red, black, green, and pink tones. Esquire Korea's Kim Ji-hyo specifically highlighted the use of the shade #CF0058, interpreting it as a reference to Jackson's birth year, 1958.

On August 29, SM released the trailer "Taste of Sun", a cinematic metaphor for Haechan's artistic growth featuring snippets of upcoming tracks and combining 2D animation and color-to-monochrome contrasts with light-themed visuals. The narrative shows Haechan navigating a series of strange, uncontrollable events, eventually discovering the existence of his "inner god", a solar deity that had been watching him, and ultimately merging with him. Building on the themes established in "Taste of Sun", the medley video "Taste of Light", released on September 2, features snippets of five tracks and depicts Haechan's evolution by tracing his journey from being a trainee guided by a stage light to becoming the light itself.

On September 5, Haechan hosted a listening event in Jung District, Seoul, featuring specially prepared food and themed spaces designed like an art gallery and a jazz bar. In the gallery-style space, fans could view album-related content and take photos, while the jazz bar offered an early listening experience paired with album-related stories. A teaser for the music video of "Crzy" was released a day before the album's release. Taste was released at 6PM (KST) on September 8, 2025, along with the music video of "Crzy", depicting Haechan's pursuit of a stranger after a chance encounter at an art museum. That day, Haechan hosted a live broadcast to present the album. In the first week of release, Haechan topped Circle's Album and Retail Album charts with Taste and Download and BGM charts with "Crzy" in South Korea. The single also reached number 11 on the Circle Digital Chart.

Haechan first performed "Crzy" on 1theK Originals' series On the Spot on September 10. He went on to perform the song for two weeks on South Korean music shows, appearing on M Countdown, Music Bank, Show! Music Core, and Inkigayo from September 11–14 and September 18–21. On September 19, "Crzy" won a first place music program award on Music Bank. In October, Haechan held a series of fan meetings in Japan, visiting Osaka on the 8th, Tokyo on the 10th, and Nagoya on the 11th. Haechan also performed on KBS Song Festival on December 19. At the Seoul Jazz Festival on May 23, 2026, he performed songs from Taste and covers of Ed Sheeran's "Thinking Out Loud", Jackson's "Love Never Felt So Good", and NCT U's "Pado", for which he was joined by fellow NCT member Taeyong. He also performed at the Busan One Asia Festival on June 27.

== Critical reception ==
Taste received positive reviews upon release. Critics commented that Taste proved Haechan's capability as a soloist and inspired anticipation regarding his future artistic evolution. Idology named it one of the best albums of 2025, while critic Seo Jeong-min-gap listed it as one of the best albums released in September 2025. Critic Kim Yun-ha highlighted the record as one of the year's standout examples of the growing number of interesting, high-quality projects from K-pop soloists with the potential to draw new listeners to the genre. Taste received nominations for Millions Top 10 at the 2025 Melon Music Awards and Best Music 10 at the 2025 Korea Grand Music Awards.

Critics praised Haechan's commitment to fully embrace the R&B genre within a cohesive record. Kim Young-dae argued that Taste should be evaluated from the standpoint of an R&B record regardless of Haechan's background in K-pop, highlighting the absence of filler tracks typically found on K-pop records. He remarked on the technical complexity of Deez's production and opined that his heavy involvement in the record helped Haechan distinguish himself from SM's legacy of R&B soloists like Baekhyun and Jonghyun. Critic Choi Seung-in described Taste as a "highly accomplished" record that transcends the simple reproduction of R&B and soul "to meticulously reconstruct them with a contemporary sensibility". He credited the producers for the album's ability to maintain "a consistent density" without ever feeling fragmented. Idology stated that Taste "re-examines the value" of a "full-length album" in an industry of increasingly shorter releases by incorporating instrumentals and outros to establish an immersive, "cyclical structure" that enhances the album's storytelling. TV Daily's Kim Ji-ha concurred that the record becomes more compelling when heard in its original track order.

Critics commended Haechan's vocal performance on Taste. Kim Young-dae and Kim Yun-ha labeled the record a "vocal stunt show" and an exhibition of "vocal virtuosity bordering on ostentation" respectively. Choi Seung-in praised the standout synergy between the vocals and the production, characterizing Haechan as a "performance-oriented" singer leading the arrangement instead of a vocalist "merely [...] layered over the track". TV Daily's Choi Ha-na commented that Haechan's "distinctively unique, beautiful voice and solid vocal technique" constitute the foundation of the album, gaining an "even deeper appeal" as he independently leads the narrative. Idology remarked that Haechan fully utilized his natural vocal strengths and showcased a versatile range on Taste. Sports Donga's Jeon Hyo-jin included Haechan's work on Taste in her list "Voice of the Year", praising his "incredible" vocal tone and expertise across different genres, particularly with regard to soul.

The Hollywood Reporter's Nicole Fell ranked "Crzy" at number 20 in the magazine's list of the 40 best K-pop songs of 2025, describing it as a "superb single" and complimenting the choreography and styling. In a mixed review of "Crzy", Park Seung-min called it a "safe" single, appreciating its modern take on past trends but questioning whether it fully showcased Haechan's "delicate, high-pitched voice". Park found the track less compelling than the "trendy" "Adrenaline" or the "retro-style" "Camera Lights". Among the tracks, Idology singled out "Should Be" as the album's highlight, Jeon Hyo-jin listed "Roll with Me" and "WYN?" among the K-pop B-sides of 2025 that are "too good to be overlooked", and Clash's Natalia Kabenge ranked "Adrenaline" at number three in her list of the year's best tracks from K-pop artists, praising the vocal layering and Haechan's "dextrous" voice.

== Track listing ==
| No. | Title | Lyrics | Music | Arrangement | Length |
|---|---|---|---|---|---|
| 1. | "Camera Lights" | Oh Yoo-won; Moon Su-jin | Deez (Soultriii); Yunsu (Soultriii); Young Chance | Deez; Yunsu | 3:45 |
| 2. | "Crzy" | Bigone | Deez; Yunsu; Rico Greene | Deez; Yunsu | 3:26 |
| 3. | "Adrenaline" | Benley (Up) | Deez; Andrew Choi; Edwin Honoret; Yunsu | Deez; Yunsu | 3:06 |
| 4. | "Love Beyond" | Seo Sung-heui BM (XYXX); Lee Su-jung (XYXX) | Deez; Coach & Sendo; Adrian McKinnon | Deez; Coach & Sendo | 3:17 |
| 5. | "Roll with Me" | Kang Eun-yu | August Rigo | Rigo | 3:23 |
| 6. | "Intermission" | | Deez; Yunsu | Deez; Yunsu | 1:14 |
| 7. | "Talented" | Bang Hye-hyun | Deez; Yunsu | Deez; Yunsu | 3:03 |
| 8. | "WYN?" (featuring Haon) | Benley; Wutan (Up); Haon | Bhavik Pattani (808Bhav808); Perklee; Young Chance; Junny | 808Bhav808; Perklee; Young Chance | 2:41 |
| 9. | "Should Be" | Deez; Vxion; Haechan | Deez; Frzm | Deez; Frzm | 3:41 |
| 10. | "Grey Rain" | Kang | Deez; Coach & Sendo | Deez; Coach & Sendo | 3:34 |
| 11. | "Outro (Back in the Studio)" | | Deez; Yunsu | Deez; Yunsu | 1:27 |
| Total length: | | | | | 32:37 |

=== Notes ===
- "Crzy" is stylized in all caps.
- "Adrenaline" is stylized in all caps.

== Credits ==
=== Locations ===
- SM Azure Studio – recording (tracks 1–2, 4–11), digital editing (tracks 1, 6, 11), engineering for mix (tracks 1–2, 4, 7–8, 11)
- Sound Alliance Studio – mixing (track 1)
- SM Lvyin Studio – recording (track 2), digital editing (track 9), mixing (track 11)
- SM Starlight Studio – digital editing (track 2), mixing (track 9)
- SM Concert Hall Studio – mixing (tracks 2, 10)
- SM Big Shot Studio – recording (track 3), mixing (tracks 6–7)
- Doobdoob Studio – digital editing (tracks 3–5, 7, 10)
- SM Droplet Studio – engineering for mix (tracks 3, 6, 8), recording (track 4)
- SM Blue Ocean Studio – mixing (track 3)
- SM Blue Cup Studio – mixing (tracks 4, 8)
- Klang Studio – mixing (track 5)
- Sound Pool Studios – digital editing (track 8)
- Bernie Grundman Mastering – mastering

=== Personnel ===
- Haechan – vocals (all tracks), background vocals (tracks 1, 4–7, 11)
- Deez – directing (tracks 1–4, 6, 9–11), background vocals (tracks 1–2, 4, 6–7, 9–11), bass (tracks 1–2, 6–7, 9), guitar (tracks 1–2, 6–7, 10–11), keyboard (tracks 1–4, 6–7, 9, 11), MIDI programming (tracks 1–4, 6–7, 11), digital editing (tracks 1–4, 6–7, 9–11), vocal directing (track 7), drums (track 9)
- Young Chance – directing (tracks 1, 8), background vocals (tracks 1, 8), vocal directing (track 5)
- Yunsu – bass (tracks 1, 6–7), guitar (tracks 1–2, 6–7, 9, 11), MIDI programming (tracks 2–3, 6–7, 11), keyboard (tracks 3, 7)
- Kim Jae-yeon – recording (tracks 1–2, 4–11), digital editing (tracks 1, 6, 11), engineering for mix (tracks 1–2, 4, 7–8, 11)
- David "Yungin" Kim – mixing (track 1)
- Saay – background vocals (track 2)
- Lee Ji-hong – recording (track 2), digital editing (track 9), mixing (track 11)
- Jung Yoo-ra – digital editing (track 2), mixing (track 9)
- Nam Koong-jin – mixing (tracks 2, 10)
- Andrew Choi – background vocals (track 3)
- Edwin Honoret – background vocals (track 3)
- Lee Min-kyu – recording (track 3), mixing (tracks 6–7)
- Kwon Yu-jin – digital editing (tracks 3–5, 7, 10)
- Kim Joo-hyun – engineering for mix (tracks 3, 6, 8), recording (track 4)
- Kim Cheol-sun – mixing (track 3)
- Adrian McKinnon – background vocals (track 4)
- Coach – keyboard, MIDI programming (track 4)
- Baek Seon-cheol (Sendo) – keyboard (track 4), MIDI programming (track 4), guitar (track 10)
- Jung Eui-seok – mixing (tracks 4, 8)
- August Rigo – background vocals (track 5)
- Eom Se-hyun – engineering for mix (track 5)
- Koo Jong-pil – mixing (track 5)
- Hyun – vocal directing (track 7)
- Vxion – background vocals (track 7)
- Haon – vocals (track 8)
- Junny – background vocals (track 8)
- Park Woo-jung (Perklee) – bass (track 8)
- Jung Ho-jin – digital editing (track 8)
- Frzm – keyboard (track 9)
- Mike Bozzi – mastering

== Charts ==
=== Weekly charts ===
Weekly chart performance for Taste
| Chart (2025) | Peak position |
|---|---|
| Japanese Albums (Oricon) | 4 |
| Japanese Combined Albums (Oricon) | 4 |
| Japanese Hot Albums (Billboard Japan) | 24 |
| South Korean Albums (Circle) | 1 |

=== Monthly charts ===
Monthly chart performance for Taste
| Chart (2025) | Position |
|---|---|
| Japanese Albums (Oricon) | 18 |
| South Korean Albums (Circle) | 8 |

=== Year-end charts ===
Year-end chart performance for Taste
| Chart (2025) | Position |
|---|---|
| South Korean Albums (Circle) | 54 |

== Certifications and sales ==
Certifications and sales for Taste
| Region | Certification | Certified units/sales |
|---|---|---|
| Japan | — | 22,658 |
| South Korea (KMCA) | Platinum | 434,611 |

== Release history ==
Releases for Taste
| Region | Date | Label(s) | Format(s) | Ref. |
|---|---|---|---|---|
| Various | September 8, 2025 | SM; Kakao | CD; digital download; streaming | |
| Various | November 4, 2025 | SM; Kakao | LP | |

== See also ==
- List of Circle Album Chart number ones of 2025
