= Loveholic (EP) =

- Digital cover

EP by NCT 127
- Released: February 17, 2021
- Studio: SM (Seoul)
- Genres: Hip hop; R&B; J-pop
- Length: 20:39
- Languages: Japanese; Korean
- Label: Avex Trax
- Producers: Moonshine; Bobii Lewis; LDN Noise; Deez; Dem Jointz; Ryan S. Jhun; Gharah 'PK' Degeddingseze

NCT 127 chronology
Neo Zone (2020)	Loveholic (2021)	Sticker (2021)

NCT chronology
NCT 2020 Resonance (2020)	Loveholic (2021)	Kick Back (2021)

Singles from Loveholic
- 1. "First Love" Released: January 26, 2021; 2. "Gimme Gimme" Released: February 17, 2021

Loveholic (stylized as LOVEHOLIC or LOVE HOLIC) is the second Japanese extended play by South Korean boy band NCT 127, the multi-national and second sub-unit of NCT. The six-track EP was released on February 17, 2021, by their Japanese record label Avex Trax. It was initially planned for release on December 23, 2020, but was delayed to the final release date due to production issues. The album sold over 133,600 copies in Japan in its first week of release, and debuted atop the Oricon Albums Chart.

== Track listing ==
Loveholic track listing
No.	Title	Lyrics	Music	Arrangement	Length
1.	"Gimme Gimme"	MEG.ME	Kenzie; Ludwig Evers (Moonshine); Jonatan Gusmark (Moonshine); Bobii Lewis; Cazzi Opeia (Sunshine)	Kenzie; Moonshine	3:39
2.	"Lipstick"	SHOW (Digz Inc.)	LDN Noise; Deez; Ebenezer Olaoluwa Fabiyi; Adrian McKinnon	LDN Noise	3:33
3.	"First Love"	SHOW (Digz Inc.)	G'harah "PK" Degeddingseze (80hdmuzic); Wilbart "Vedo" McCoy III; Rudi Daouk (Jay & Rudy); Jakob Mihoubi (Jay & Rudy)	G'harah "PK" Degeddingseze (80hdmuzic)	3:00
4.	"Chica Bom Bom"	Boyhood (Digz Inc.)	Didrik Thott; Willie Weeks; Dani Paz	Willie Weeks; Geek Boy Al Swettenham; Dani Paz	3:20
5.	"Kick It" (Korean: 영웅; Hanja: 英雄; RR: Yeong-ung; lit. 'Hero')	Wutan; Rick Bridges; danke (lalala Studio)	Dem Jointz; Mayila Jones; Rodnae "Chikk" Bell; Deez; Ryan S. Jhun; Yoo Young-jin	Dem Jointz; Deez; Yoo Young-jin	3:53
6.	"Right Now"	Akira (Palm Drive)	Dem Jointz; Ian Jeffrey Thomas (NOPROMO Co); Andrew Beckner (NOPROMO Co); Ryan S. Jhun	NOPROMO Co; Dem Jointz; Ryan S. Jhun	3:13
Total length:					20:40

== Charts ==
=== Weekly charts ===
Weekly chart performance for Loveholic
Chart (2021)	Peak position
Japanese Albums (Oricon)	1
Japan Hot Albums (Billboard Japan)	1

=== Monthly charts ===
Monthly chart performance for Loveholic
Chart (2021)	Peak position
Japanese Albums (Oricon)	1

=== Year-end charts ===
Year-end chart performance for Loveholic
Chart (2021)	Position
Japanese Albums (Oricon)	22
Japan Hot Albums (Billboard Japan)	23

== Certifications ==
Certifications for Loveholic
Region	Certification	Certified units/sales
Japan (RIAJ)	Gold	153,243

== Release history ==
Release dates and formats for Loveholic
Region	Date	Format	Label
Various	February 17, 2021	Digital download; streaming	Avex Trax
Japan	February 17, 2021	CD; CD+Blu-ray	Avex Trax
