= Neo Zone =

- Digital, kihno and T version cover

Studio album by NCT 127
- Released: March 6, 2020
- Recorded: 2017–2020
- Studio: SM (Seoul)
- Genres: Hip hop; R&B
- Length: 45:46
- Languages: Korean; English
- Labels: SM; Dreamus; Caroline
- Producers: Dem Jointz; Deez; Yoo Young-jin; The Stereotypes; LDN Noise; Harvey Mason Jr.; Kevin Randolph; Kenzie; Ryan S. Jhun; Hitchhiker; Alawn; Sylvester Willy Sivertsen; Max Wolfgang; Shae Jacobs; Rice N' Peas; Erik Lidbom; Ian Jeffrey Thomas; Squar; Mike Daley; Dewain Whitmore; Patrick "J. Que" Smith; Britt Burton; ADC Music

NCT 127 chronology
Neo City: Seoul – The Origin (2019)	Neo Zone (2020)	Loveholic (2021)

NCT chronology
The Dream (2020)	Neo Zone (2020)	Reload (2020)

Singles from Neo Zone
- 1. "Dreams Come True" Released: January 27, 2020; 2. "Kick It" Released: March 6, 2020

Alternative cover
- Repackage edition digital cover

Singles from Neo Zone: The Final Round
- 1. "Punch" Released: May 19, 2020

Neo Zone (also known as NCT #127: Neo Zone) is the second Korean studio album (third overall) by the South Korean boy band NCT 127. Preceded by the music video release for "Dreams Come True" on NCT 127 Day, January 27 (1/27), the 13-track album was released through SM Entertainment and Capitol Music Group on March 6, 2020. Neo Zone contains various musical genres from hip hop, R&B, funk, to electro-pop, which aimed to create a soundscape that broadened the group's sonic vision. The repackaged version of the album, titled NCT No. 127 Neo Zone: The Final Round, was released on May 19, 2020.

Several music critics noted the album's strong 1990s hip hop and R&B influences and the experimentation with various sounds. The album was commercially successful, becoming their fifth chart-topper on the Gaon Album Chart while earning the group their first top-five entry on the Billboard 200 chart, with first week sales of 87,000 album-equivalent units. As of April 2020, the album had sold over 805,000 copies in South Korea, becoming the group's first release to receive a multi-Platinum KMCA certification. The repackage gave the group their sixth number one title on the Gaon Album Chart, and rose cumulative sales of the record to over 1.2 million copies.

Three singles were released from Neo Zone: including the pre-released "Dreams Come True", the lead single "Kick It", and the repackaged album's single "Punch". To promote the album, the group performed on South Korean music programs including Music Bank, Show! Music Core and Inkigayo, while becoming the first K-pop act to perform at Houston Livestock Show and Rodeo. The group originally planned to embark on their first U.S. arena tour; titled "Neo City – The Awards" from June 6, 2020, but was cancelled due to the COVID-19 lockdown.

== Background and release ==
=== Neo Zone ===
After wrapping up promotion activities in the United States by the end of November 2019, SM Entertainment uploaded a music video for "Dreams Come True" onto the group's official channel, along with the release announcement for NCT #127: Neo Zone on January 27, 2020. The label further confirmed that member Jungwoo would re-join and participate in the group's promotion activities following his initial hiatus from August 2019. This marked Neo Zone their first release since Neo City: Seoul – The Origin in October 2019, their first original release since We Are Superhuman in May 2019 and their second full-length album, following Regular-Irregular and its repackage in late 2018.

On February 12, the group released a 90's-influenced "timeline" video for the album on all social media platforms of the group, including a release schedule and announcing "영웅 / 英雄 (Kick It)" as the lead single. It was then followed by several track videos previewing other songs from the album. before the music video teaser for "Kick It" was uploaded on the official SMTown channel on March 3, 2020. The album was eventually released both physically and digitally on March 6, 2020, with two different versions N, C, and different album covers. The T version was released later on March 20, 2020, while the Kihno version was released on March 27, 2020. With the exception of the album's interlude, the remaining album tracks of Neo Zone were uploaded fully onto the group's official channel, thus making it the group's first release to do so.

=== Neo Zone: The Final Round ===
Following the commercial success of Neo Zone in March 2020. SM Entertainment announced on April 7 that a repackage version of the album, titled NCT #127 Neo Zone: The Final Round would be released sometimes in May 2020. The release date was later confirmed to be on May 19, 2020, with four new tracks including the third single, titled "Punch". The first image teasers of the repackage edition, which contains a similar release schedule like the original release, was revealed on NCT 127's official Twitter account. A 22-second music video teaser for "Punch" was released onto the group's native label YouTube channel on May 17, 2020, three days prior to its official premiere. The album was eventually released in all formats on May 19, while the physical release date for United States was scheduled to be on June 12, 2020, instead. The repackage is available in two versions, featuring a CD-R with all seventeen tracks, photo booklet and collectibles accordingly to the package artwork. Similar to their previous release, three new songs from The Final Round was uploaded onto the group's official YouTube channel as well.

== Recording and production ==
Recording process for the album took place at SM Studio, located in Seoul, South Korea. The production for Neo Zone however, started sometimes in early 2017 as American production team The Stereotypes had their own songwriting camp for SM Entertainment, not long after their work for Bruno Mars's 2016 studio album 24K Magic. Meanwhile, South Korean songwriter and producer Deez was seeking for something "new and fun", having worked on three other songs at the same time. He eventually reached out to the production team, looking for any unused track that "has the "That's What I Like"-vibe" among the demos they had for Mars' album. As the team played their demos on laptop, Deez eventually chose one that matched what he was looking. Together with songwriter Bianca "Blush" Atterberry, he managed to complete "Love Song", with the original demo was said to contain "more harmony" than the final version. The recording process for this track was, however, completed "in a very short time", though the producer said "Love Song" was "difficult to sing". After returning from a song session in the United States during sometimes in 2018, Deez participated in another SM songwriting camp, where he produced the uptempo track "Love Me Now" in "about four hours". Even though the song had a more pop-oriented sound, he used R&B elements to "build a more Pop-tic but a little unusual topline", with the result being "satisfying". With "Dreams Come True", the composers originally had NCT 127's 2018 single "Touch" in mind, with British production team LDN Noise creating a basic loop. Deez and songwriter Bobii Lewis then wrote additional arrangement; including piano and musical variations, bridge and main Moog lines to complete the track first. It was eventually a favorite from the A&R executives, and the first track to be recorded by the members.

"I got inspiration from my own personal experiences and the overall atmosphere and subject of the song, and put those two together. And this time around, it was more of a team effort—rather than relying solely on my own creativity, I wrote my lyrics so they flowed well with Johnny and Mark's rhyming and flow. "

— Taeyong on the process of writing for the group's second full-length Korean album.

For the lead single "Kick It", the group recalled having to record the hook up to late at night. According to producer Deez, the song was "revised and multiplied" for about a hundred times from end of December 2019 to early February 2020. Co-produced with American producer Dem Jointz and SM songwriter-producer Yoo Young-jin (whom worked with the group during their recording session), the song was originally prepared to "gird the loins" for "Cherry Bomb 2.0", with the outcome being "stronger" than the 2017 single. With the song's beat loop created by Abernathy, Deez constructed and composed the bridge and the dance break section with the idea of "maintaining" the "harmonic vocal color" and "extensively energetic" chord work, thus giving an R&B arrangement to bring out a "trendy and old-school" color to the song. Member Taeyong and Mark were said to have recorded their rap parts in one-take to their preferences, and proceeded to arrange all the qualified cuts later with the album's producers. As the album wrapped up its recording process, Deez was requested by the label to create an additional instrumental prelude, which he produced by using excerpts of "Kick It" to create an "oriental" interlude shortly before the album release in March. In addition to his initial composition contribution, Deez also took part as the vocal director for "White Night", a collaboration between American producer Harvey Mason Jr. (former member of The Underdogs), The Wildcardz production team and SM songwriter Kenzie. He further revealed that the recording session for the track was "quite long" due to the traditional R&B elements compared to the group's previous R&B works. In addition to the usual lyrical contribution by Taeyong and Mark, member Johnny also took part in writing for two songs in the album, namely "Pandora's Box" and "Love Song" with his aforementioned two group members.

== Composition ==
=== Neo Zone ===
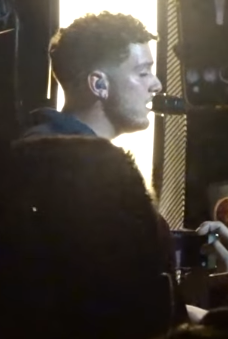
American singer Bazzi co-wrote "Boom" for Neo Zone.

Described as a "diversified selection" of mainly hip-hop and "slinky" R&B cuts with strong 1990s influence, the 13-track album also includes elements from funk, trap, noise-pop, metal, dance-pop and EDM music. The album opens with "Elevator (127F)", a "feel-good" midtempo dance number with funk elements and 90's R&B influence which is "refreshing" and "perfect" for an album opener, according to the members. It was proceeded by the album's lead single "Kick It", a "powerful" hip-hop dance record with heavy metal guitar riff and R&B elements throughout the song. Produced by American producer Dem Jointz, South Korean songwriter Deez, Ryan S. Jhun, Mayila Jones and Rodnae "Chikk" Bell, with Yoo Young-jin took part in the song's arrangement, the song tells how the members overcome their own traumas and fears to become the "heroes" they are, thus fitting the Korean title of the song. The third track "Boom" is a "half-dreamy and half-beat-driven" song that contains a "unique" melody change as the melody hook of the song starts. It was co-written and performed in demo by American singer and songwriter Bazzi, whom member Mark is a huge fan of. The album continues with "Pandora's Box", a "jazzy, slow-burning" 90's-influenced R&B track produced by producer Erik Lidbom. With lyrics co-written by member Taeyong, Mark and Johnny (whom participated in writing lyrics for the first time), the boy group channels their "endearing cheesiness" as they compare their love interest to that of a Pandora's box. The fifth track "Day Dream" is described as a "mysterious, dream-like" track by the members, with "memorable" lyrics based on Alice in Wonderland while showcasing the group's "ethereal" vocals.

The next half of Neo Zone starts with "Interlude: Neo Zone", an instrumental interlude that makes listeners "imagine" a powerful and energetic performance according to member Jungwoo. Starting out with strings and piano instrument, the interlude slowly progresses with wind chime sound before turning into an EDM-trap groove, which suits the signature "NEO" sound of the group. It was followed by the Hitchhiker-assisted "Mad Dog", a "raucous" hip-hop banger performed by member Taeyong and Mark which contains metal riff and "brassy" trap breakdown with a key change at the second drop, accompanied with a "dreamy" bridge by member Taeil and Doyoung. "Sit Down" is described as a "thunderous", "rare strong song" and hailed as the most straight-up hip-hop moment of the album, with 90s R&B vibe included. Produced by high-profile producers such as Harvey Mason Jr. and Patrick "J. Que" Smith, its lyrics recite how the members refused to be "tied down" to any standard. The EDM-influenced "Love Me Now" is said to be a "concert banger" and a "great song" to perform at concert by member Yuta, while being compared to the group's previous tracks like "Replay (PM 01:27)" and "Switch". The tenth track "Love Song" is another R&B track which is "full of attitude and soul" by the members, as the chorus is performed together with ad-libs appeared throughout the entire song. Production for the track came from The Stereotypes and Deez, with the former being most known for their work with Bruno Mars while having previously worked with NCT 127 twice ("Back 2 U (AM 01:27)" and "City 127"). It was continued with "White Night", a "traditional" R&B ballad track which invokes "jazz piano-laden" soul influence which became a favorite of member Taeil. On "Not Alone", the members takes a "much more minimalistic" approach over a "tender, warm" trap-influenced synth-pop beat, where they embrace a hopeful message that "we are never alone." The final track "Dreams Come True" saw the group collaborate again with LDN Noise and Deez for a "classic, nostalgic" R&B throwback with jazzy piano melody that recalls both the visual and sonic aesthetics of '90s boy band R&B ballads. It was among the first songs the group recorded for their second album, and became a personal favorite of member Doyoung.

=== Neo Zone: The Final Round ===
Following the repackage confirmation by the group's home label on April 7, 2020, the title of four new additional songs to the original 13-track release were revealed: "Punch", "Non Stop", "Make Your Day" and "序曲; Prelude". The urban soul, Hip hop "Punch" describes the "dynamic beat that rings in boxers' ears" when they enter the boxing ring with "intense and unique" synths. Written by SM songwriter Kenzie (whom member Doyoung confirmed her participation through the group's official Twitter account) and co-produced by Dem Jointz, the song shares how the members overcome their "lonely moments" whenever they feel like "fighting obstacles alone". It is the lead single from The Final Round, and subsequently the third single overall from Neo Zone. She also contributed both lyrics and composition to the second track "Non Stop", a strong future bass-influenced track with synth sound and drum beats expressing how one "won't stop running" to reach for their love interest despite the hardships. Production team LDN Noise also took part in the song's arrangement, having previously worked with the group on "Dreams Come True". "Make Your Day" is described as a jazzy, "warm pop ballad" which sees the member harmonize chorus together with strings, rich harmony and their soft voice over a warm piano melody. The song features the vocal from five members: Taeil, Doyoung, Jaehyun, Jungwoo and Haechan. The repackage album also sees the addition of "序曲; Prelude", an instrumental interlude precedes "Kick It" as the now-fourth track. According to producer Deez, the "oriental, ethnic" interlude is meant to "flow naturally" to "Kick It" as it goes along, sampling the main riff and the "na na na" harmonization during the dance break. The interlude was among the last additional work to be created before the initial release of Neo Zone, and was eventually performed live during the group's promotion cycle for "Kick It".

== Singles and promotion ==
=== Singles ===
Prior to the official release, the group revealed a '90s-influenced music video for "Dreams Come True" through their official YouTube channel on January 27, 2020 (which coincided with the group's 127 number). The song eventually peaked at number one hundred ninety-six and number sixty on Gaon Digital Chart and Billboard K-Pop Hot 100, respectively. The music video for the second single "Kick It" was revealed two days prior to its digital release, which coincided with the album release). The song achieved an increasing digital performance comparing to the group's previous releases, peaking at number twenty-one on Gaon Digital Chart, number nine and three on the Billboard K-Pop Hot 100 and World Digital Songs, respectively. The song also became the group's second appearance on the New Zealand Hot 40 Singles chart, and third on the Japan Hot 100 chart; peaking at number thirty-eight and eighty-four respectively.

Following the repackage confirmation by SM Entertainment on April 7, the group announced that "Punch" would be the lead single for the re-release edition. In continuation to the group's rising success, the single became their first top five entry on the Gaon Digital Chart, and their highest-charting release on the Japan Hot 100 since the release of their 2018 Japanese single "Chain."

=== Tour and live performances ===
Promotion for the album started with the group's first performance for the then-unreleased "序曲; Prelude" and "Kick It" as NCT 127 The Stage through their official channel on March 5, 2020. A day later, NCT 127 had their first music show performance for the lead single on Music Bank, followed by their promotion on Show! Music Core and Inkigayo. During the second promotion week on Music Bank and SBS Radio, the group performed the eleventh track "White Night". NCT 127 eventually earned their first Music Bank trophy for "Kick It" on March 27, 2020. NCT 127 then started promoting their third single "Punch" from May 22, 2020, with a live performance on Music Bank, with similar scheduled promotion on Show! Music Core and Inkigayo to that of "Kick It." They eventually won the first M Countdown trophy on May 28, 2020, despite not attending nor performing at the show. The song has since achieved a total of four trophies, tying with "Regular" as their most winning title on such television music shows.

In continuation to their previous promotion activities in the United States, the group had their first gig on March 10 at Houston Livestock Show and Rodeo, becoming the very first K-pop act to perform at the show. It was reported that they would embark on their first U.S. arena tour; titled "Neo City – The Awards", to promote Neo Zone starting from June 6 at New York City's Madison Square Garden, which was later postponed due to the COVID-19 lockdown. On May 15, 2020, it was announced that the tour had been cancelled due to the COVID-19 pandemic. As announced earlier by their home label, NCT 127 had their scheduled live streaming Beyond Live concert on May 17, 2020, proceeding their fellow unit as the fourth headlining act. The group also performed live "Punch" and the album track "Make Your Day" for the first time during their live streaming concert.

==== Cancelled tour dates ====
Date	City	Country	Venue
Leg 1 – North America
June 5, 2020	New York	United States	Madison Square Garden
June 10, 2020	Atlanta	United States	Infinite Energy Arena
June 15, 2020	Chicago	United States	Wintrust Arena
June 18, 2020	San Jose	United States	SAP Center
June 19, 2020	Los Angeles	United States	The Forum
June 21, 2020	Seattle	United States	WAMU Theater

== Critical reception ==
Professional ratings
Review scores
Source	Rating
Clash	8/10
Consequence of Sound	B+
IZM	3/5 stars

Following its release, Neo Zone received positive reviews from music critics. Giving the album 3 stars out of 5, writer Im Sun-hwi of IZM noted that the diverse multi-genre release had a few hip-hop moments that "did not live up to expectations", but praised the lead single and the latter half of the album for its "refreshing" atmosphere and proved that the group's success with the album was "not a coincidence". According to Alexis Hodoyan-Gastelum of Consequence of Sound, the album presents the group at their best, as it "checks off all the boxes when it comes to playing to their strengths, which include vocal versatility, a diversified selection of hip-hop and R&B jams, and giving fans a fun, good time". Writing for Clash, writer Debbie Aderinkomi complimented the album as an "assurement" to please the group's fandom and new fans alike, while noting "its blend and influence" from different genres like pop, R&B and rap despite any "lack of certain cohesion" impression, giving the group eight points out of ten. In a Rolling Stone article by Tim Chan, the writer praised the album's ability to "seamlessly slide in and out of genres" and "experimenting" for making the group become a stand-out. Vandana Pawa of Teen Vogue said that the group "feels more fully-evolved" and "more choosy" than ever, along with the confidence in their presentation through the release of Neo Zone, further indicated the boy band's broader vision for a "dynamic, passionate" presence.

Billboard ranked Neo Zone as the 5th best K-pop album of 2020, while South China Morning Post included the repackage in their unranked list of the top 15 K-pop albums of the year. MTV News included "Love Me Now" at number 17 in their list of best K-pop B-sides of 2020.

== Commercial performance ==
The album debuted at number one on Gaon Album Chart for the week of March 7, 2020, becoming the group's fifth chart-topper and their second release to stay atop more than one week. Except for the album's interlude, the entire album tracks also charted on the Gaon Digital Chart, making Neo Zone the group's first release to do so. It eventually became the top-selling album of March 2020 on Gaon Album Chart, with a cumulative sales of 748,000 copies from both the physical version and the Kihno version, which appeared independently at number eleven on the monthly chart. Combined an additional sales of over 59,000 copies (counting both the standard and Kihno version) in April 2020, the album has since achieved a cumulative sales of over 807,000 copies, thus granting NCT 127 their first album to qualify for a multi-Platinum KMCA certification. Upon its re-release under the name The Final Round, the album spent a third week atop the chart, and was the second best-selling release of May 2020 on the monthly chart of Gaon Album Chart with 409,620 copies sold. It was also certified Platinum by KCMA, earning NCT 127 their fourth Platinum-certified release. With the repackage edition's sales combined, Neo Zone became the first million-seller album for NCT 127 in South Korea, having sold over 1,2 million copies as of May 2020.

The album also attained international success. By debuting at number five on the US Billboard 200 with 87,000 album-equivalent units (including 83,000 pure album sales), Neo Zone surpassed the eleventh-peaked We Are Superhuman to become the group's first top five entry, earning them their best sales week to date, and subsequently their longest chart performance on the chart to date. Following the release of The Final Round, the album re-entered the chart at number fourteen on the week of June 27, 2020, before descending to number forty the following week. Additionally, Neo Zone was the eighth best-selling physical release in the States as of June 2020, having sold an estimated total of 196,000 copies. It also became the group's third chart-topper on the Billboard World Albums chart following Limitless (2017) and We Are Superhuman (2019), and by far their longest topping reign on the chart with three weeks at number one position, upon its re-release. It also appeared at number twenty-six and thirty-four on the Canadian Albums Chart and the Official UK Digital Album chart respectively, thus making it their highest peak position to date. The album also reached a peak of number three on the Japanese Oricon Albums Chart, having sold a total of 32,453 copies as of April 2020, while The Final Round reached number four upon its release in later May.

== Track listing ==
Credits adapted from Naver

Neo Zone track listing
No.	Title	Lyrics	Music	Arrangement	Length
1.	"Elevator (127F)"	Cheon Song-yi (Joombas)	Sylvester "Sly" Willy Sivertsen; Max "Wolfgang" McElligott; Shae Jacobs	Sly; Wolfgang; Jacobs	3:29
2.	"Kick It" (Korean: 영웅; Hanja: 英雄; RR: Yeongung; lit. 'Hero')	Wutan; Rick Bridges; danke (lalala Studio)	Dem Jointz; Mayila Jones; Rodnae "Chikk" Bell; Deez; Ryan S. Jhun; Yoo Young-jin	Dem Jointz; Deez; Yoo Young-jin	3:53
3.	"Boom" (꿈; Kkum; 'Dream')	Seo Ji-eum	Kevin White (Rice N' Peas); Mike Woods (Rice N' Peas); Andrew Bazzi (Rice N' Peas); MZMC	Rice N' Peas	3:29
4.	"Pandora's Box" (낮잠; Natjam; 'Nap')	JQ (Makeumine Works); Hyeon Ji-won (Makeumine Works); Kim Hye-ji (Makeumine Works); Taeyong; Mark; Johnny	Erik Lidbom	Lidbom	4:09
5.	"Day Dream" (白日夢; Baegilmong)	Hwang Yoo-bin	Ian Jeffrey Thomas (Nopromo Co); Hannah Wilson; Ariowa Irosogie; Andrew Beckner (Nopromo Co)	Nopromo Co	3:25
6.	"Interlude: Neo Zone"		Squar (Blur)	Squar (Blur)	1:39
7.	"Mad Dog" (뿔; Ppul; 'Horn') (sung by Taeil, Doyoung, Mark and Taeyong)	Kim Boo-min; Taeyong; Mark	Hitchhiker; Charles "Chizzy" Stephens III; John Fulford III; Christopher Newland	Hitchhiker	3:03
8.	"Sit Down!"	Hwang Yoo-bin; Tommy Strate	Harvey Mason Jr.; Dewain Whitmore; Patrick "J. Que" Smith; Britt Burton	Mason Jr.; Kevin Randolph	3:20
9.	"Love Me Now" (메아리; Meari; 'Echo')	Le'mon (Joombas); Rick Bridges	Mike Daley; Mitchell Owens; Deez; Willbart "Vedo" McCoy III	Daley; Owens	4:08
10.	"Love Song" (우산; Usan; 'Umbrella')	Seo Ji-eum; Taeyong; Mark; Johnny	The Stereotypes; Deez; Bianca Atterberry	The Stereotypes; Deez	3:35
11.	"White Night" (백야; Baegya)	Ji Yu-ri; JQ (Makeumine Works); Kim Hye-jung (Makeumine Works)	Kenzie; Mason Jr.; Randolph; Dewain Whitmore; Ester Na (The Wildcardz); Sadie Currey (The Wildcardz)	Mason Jr.; Randolph	4:03
12.	"Not Alone"	Jo Yoon-kyung	Nicki Adamsson; Michael Matosic; Michelle Elaine Buzz	Adamsson	3:45
13.	"Dreams Come True"	Kim Woo-jung; Lee Chang-hyuk; Jeon Ji-eun (January 8th (lalala Studio)); Hwang Seon-jeong (January 8th (lalala Studio)); Kim Jeong-mi (January 8th (lalala Studio)); Min Yeon-jae (lalala Studio); Lee Hyo-jae (lalala Studio)	LDN Noise; Deez; Bobii Lewis	LDN Noise	3:45
Total length:					45:46

Neo Zone: The Final Round track listing
No.	Title	Lyrics	Music	Arrangement	Length
1.	"Punch"	Kenzie	Kenzie; Dem Jointz; Keynon "KC" Moore (3Sixty)	Kenzie; Dem Jointz; Harold "Alawn" Philippon; Ryan S. Jhun	3:24
2.	"Non Stop"	Kenzie	Kenzie; LDN Noise; Adrian McKinnon	LDN Noise	3:24
3.	"Prelude" (서곡; 序曲; Seogok)		Deez; Dem Jointz; Yoo Young-jin	Deez	1:45
4.	"Kick It" (영웅; 英雄; Yeongung; 'Hero')	Wutan; Rick Bridges; danke (lalala Studio)	Dem Jointz; Mayila Jones; Rodnae "Chikk" Bell; Deez; Ryan S. Jhun; Yoo Young-jin	Dem Jointz; Deez; Yoo Young-jin	3:53
5.	"Boom" (꿈; Kkum; 'Dream')	Seo Ji-eum	Kevin White (Rice N' Peas); Mike Woods (Rice N' Peas); Andrew Bazzi (Rice N' Peas); MZMC	Rice N' Peas	3:29
6.	"Pandora's Box" (낮잠; Natjam; 'Nap')	JQ (Makeumine Works); Hyeon Ji-won (Makeumine Works); Kim Hye-ji (Makeumine Works); Taeyong; Mark; Johnny	Erik Lidbom	Erik Lidbom	4:09
7.	"Day Dream" (白日夢; Baegilmong)	Hwang Yoo-bin	Ian Jeffrey Thomas (NOPROMO Co); Hannah Wilson; Ariowa Irosogie; Andrew Beckner (NOPROMO Co)	NOPROMO Co	3:25
8.	"Make Your Day" (너의 하루; Neoui haru; 'Your day') (sung by Taeil, Doyoung, Jaehyun, Jungwoo and Haechan)	Seo Ji-eum	Andrew Choi (ADC Music); minGtion (ADC Music)	ADC Music	3:35
9.	"Interlude: Neo Zone"		SQUAR (Blur)	SQUAR (Blur)	1:39
10.	"Mad Dog" (뿔; Ppul; 'Horn') (sung by Taeil, Doyoung, Mark and Taeyong)	Kim Boo-min; Taeyong; Mark	Hitchhiker; Charles "Chizzy" Stephens III; John Fulford III; Christopher Newland	Hitchhiker	3:03
11.	"Sit Down!"	Hwang Yoo-bin; Tommy $trate	Harvey Mason Jr.; Dewain Whitmore; Patrick "J. Que" Smith; Britt Burton	Harvey Mason Jr.; Kevin Randolph	3:20
12.	"Love Me Now" (메아리; Meari; 'Echo')	Le'mon (Joombas); Rick Bridges	Mike Daley; Mitchell Owens; Deez; Willbart "Vedo" McCoy III	Mike Daley; Mitchell Owens	4:08
13.	"Love Song" (우산; Usan; 'Umbrella')	Seo Ji-eum; Taeyong; Mark; Johnny	The Stereotypes; Deez; Bianca Atterberry	The Stereotypes; Deez	3:35
14.	"White Night" (백야; Baegya)	Ji Yu-ri; JQ (Makeumine Works); Kim Hye-jung (Makeumine Works)	Kenzie; Harvey Mason Jr.; Kevin Randolph; Dewain Whitmore; Ester Na (The Wildcardz); Sadie Currey (The Wildcardz)	Harvey Mason Jr.; Kevin Randolph	4:03
15.	"Not Alone"	Jo Yoon-kyung	Nicki Adamsson; Michael Matosic; Michelle Elaine Buzz	Nicki Adamsson	3:45
16.	"Dreams Come True"	Kim Woo-jung; Lee Chang-hyuk; Jeon Ji-eun (January 8th (lalala Studio)); Hwang Seon-jeong (January 8th (lalala Studio)); Kim Jeong-mi (January 8th (lalala Studio)); Min Yeon-jae (lalala Studio); Lee Hyo-jae (lalala Studio)	LDN Noise; Bobii Lewis	LDN Noise; Deez	3:45
17.	"Elevator (127F)"	Cheon Song-yi (Joombas)	Sivertsen; McElligott; Jacobs	Sivertsen; McElligott; Jacobs	3:29
Total length:					57:55

== Charts ==
=== Weekly charts ===
Chart performance for both Neo Zone and The Final Round
Chart (2020)	Peak position	
Chart (2020)	NZ	TFR
Belgian Albums (Ultratop Flanders)	100	—
Belgian Albums (Ultratop Wallonia)	141	—
Canadian Albums (Billboard)	26	—
Hungarian Albums (MAHASZ)	15	15
Japanese Albums (Oricon)	3	4
Japan Hot Albums (Billboard Japan)	14	21
Lithuanian Albums (AGATA)	82	—
Polish Albums (ZPAV)	10	—
Scottish Albums (Official Charts)	47	—
South Korean Albums (Gaon)	1	1
UK Digital Albums (OCC)	34	—
US Billboard 200	5	14
US Top Album Sales	1	1
US Independent Albums	2	2
US Tastemaker Albums	1	1
US World Albums (Billboard)	1	1

=== Monthly charts ===
Chart (2020)	Peak position	
Chart (2020)	NZ	TFR
Japanese Albums (Oricon)	13	12
South Korean Albums (Gaon)	1	2

=== Year-end charts ===
Chart (2020)	Position	
Chart (2020)	NZ	TFR
Hungarian Albums (MAHASZ)	74	—
Japanese Albums (Oricon)	69	—
South Korean Albums (Gaon)	8	14
US Billboard 200	200	—
US Independent Albums (Billboard)	20	—

== Certifications ==
Certifications for Neo Zone
Region	Certification	Certified units/sales
South Korea (KMCA)	3× Platinum	750,000^{^}
^{^} Shipments figures based on certification alone.

Certifications for Neo Zone: The Final Round
Region	Certification	Certified units/sales
South Korea (KMCA)	2× Platinum	500,000^{^}
^{^} Shipments figures based on certification alone.

== Accolades ==
Music program awards
Song	Program	Date	Ref.
"Punch"	M Countdown	May 28, 2020	
"Punch"	M Countdown	June 4, 2020	
"Punch"	Music Bank	May 29, 2020	
"Punch"	Show! Music Core	May 30, 2020	

== Release history ==
Release history and formats for Neo Zone
Region	Album	Date	label	Format(s)	Catalog	Ref.
Various	Neo Zone	March 6, 2020	SM	Digital download; streaming	—N/a	
United States	Neo Zone	March 6, 2020	SM; Caroline	CD (N & C Version)	SMCD227/8	
South Korea	Neo Zone	March 6, 2020	SM; Dreamus	CD (N & C Version)	SMK1130	
South Korea	Neo Zone	March 20, 2020	SM; Dreamus	CD (T Version)	SMK1132	
South Korea	Neo Zone	March 27, 2020	SM; Dreamus	Kihno	SMKH045	
United States	Neo Zone	April 17, 2020	SM; Caroline	CD (T Version)	SMCD229	
Various	Neo Zone: The Final Round	May 19, 2020	SM	Digital download; streaming	—N/a	
South Korea	Neo Zone: The Final Round	May 19, 2020	SM; Dreamus	CD (1st & 2nd player Version)	SMK1149	
United States	Neo Zone: The Final Round	June 12, 2020	SM; Caroline	CD (1st & 2nd player Version)	SMCD230/1	
South Korea	Neo Zone: The Final Round	June 15, 2020	SM; Dreamus	Kihno	SMKH049	

== See also ==
- List of 2020 albums
- List of Gaon Album Chart number ones of 2020
