= Cho PD =

South Korean record producer and rapper

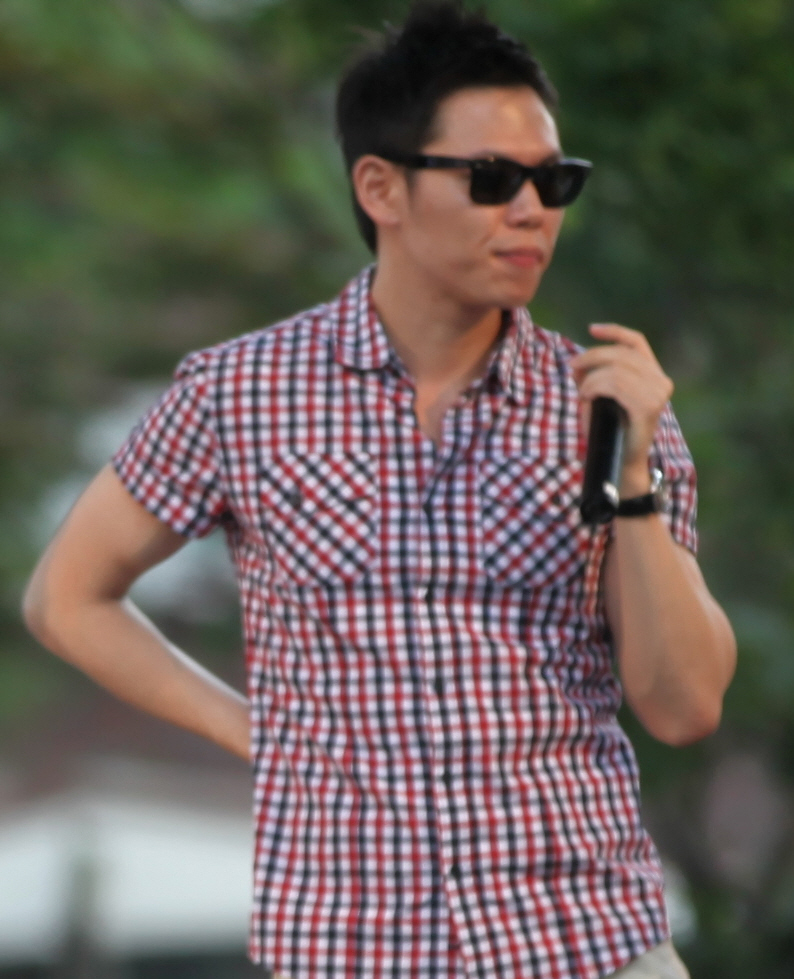
- Cho in 2010

Background information
- Born: Cho Joong-hoon; January 27, 1976 (age 50)
- Origin: South Korea
- Genre: Hip hop
- Occupations: Record producer; rapper
- Years active: 1998–2010; 2011–present

Cho Joong-hoon (Korean: 조중훈; born January 27, 1976), better known by his stage name Cho PD, is a South Korean record producer, rapper, and the founder of record label Stardom Entertainment. Producing his own music for himself and his crew Stardom (his company's eponym), he rose to prominence through the internet then debuted in 1998. Later, he also would support other artists like Psy, Verbal Jint and a young Dok2 earlier in their careers. After twelve years, he briefly "retired" from music in 2010. However, he came out of retirement in 2011 with his two studio albums, State of the Art and Art of Business.

On November 23, 2018, Cho was found guilty of fraud by the Seoul Central District Court. The sentence concerned Cho withholding undisclosed assets worth ₩270,000,000 (approx. $238,116 USD) in July 2015 when he signed a contract to transfer the assets of Stardom Entertainment to a new unnamed company. These undisclosed funds were derived from Topp Dogg's 2015 concert tour of Japan. Cho was given a two-year prison sentence, suspended for 3 years.

Since his sentencing, he made an attempt to reinvent his branding. In May 2019, he launched ChoCo Entertainment, which specializes in powering virtual AI-based K-pop idols.

In 2023, he announced the launch of a new K-Pop group called ChoCo that will have various sub-units including: ChoCo1, ChoCo2, and ChoCo1&2.

== Discography ==
=== Studio albums ===
Title	Album details	Peak chart positions	Sales
Title	Album details	KOR	Sales
In Stardom	Released: January 15, 1999; Label: Stardom Entertainment; Formats: CD, cassette; Track listing: 1. 조PD Rules; 2. 이야기 속으로; 3. Break Free (Radio Edit); 4. Party On! (feat. Ray Jay); 5. 비애; 6. Real Love 2 (Remake); 7. 썩은 XXX; 8. 이야기 속으로 2; 9. Real Love; 10. 2U, Playa Hataz; 11. 용의 눈물; 12. My Song; 13. Dear Friend; 14. Party On! (Remix); 15. Break Free (Original Edit); 16. 노출좋아	2	KOR: 204,254+
In Stardom Version 2.0	Released: August 24, 1999; Label: Stardom Entertainment; Formats: CD, cassette; Track listing: 1. 나의 라임 연습장 (Intro) (feat. Yoon Mi-rae); 2. 악동이 (feat. Digital Masta, Ray Jay); 3. Fever (feat. Lee Jung-hyun); 4. 날 잊어 2; 5. 어른 아이; 6. Garden in My Mind; 7. 카사노바 (feat. Psy); 8. 에피소드 1; 9. 돈아돈아 (feat. Ray Jay); 10. 날 잊어 1; 11. Flame (feat. Gina); 12. Dog 소리; 13. 2U, Playa Hataz 2; 14. 형장의 이슬; 15. 카사노바 끝 (Remix)	4	KOR: 194,902+
ChoPD.Net / Best In East	Released: December 27, 2000; Label: Stardom Entertainment; Formats: CD, cassette; Track listing: 1. Wise Guys (Intro); 2. Wise Guyz; 3. 격+ (feat. Ray Jay); 4. Episode II; 5. Sex and Da City; 6. 박하사탕; 7. Never Give Up II; 8. Fan Mail; 9. 3VIP F-3534.JP; 10. Skit-DM`s폭풍전야; 11. 폭풍전야 II; 12. 2U Playa Hataz III; 13. Do Da Right Thang (똑바로 살아라); 14. Outro - Death; 15. My Song (Remix); 16. Ladyz Only; 17. Saga	16	KOR: 53,596+
Stardom In Future Flow	Released: December 12, 2001; Label: Future Flow; Formats: CD, cassette; Track listing: 1. Stardom's CEO (Intro); 2. Bye Bye; 3. U 4. Back in the Dayz; 5. Never Give Up 2; 6. Shame On You; 7. 이런말 하는 날 8. My Style (feat. DJ Uzi, Wassup, DM); 9. Keep On; 10. 비애 2; 11. Run; 12. 아가씨와 건달; 13. Skit; 14. Real Love 3; 15. 떠나야 할 땐 (Bonus Track)	26	KOR: 38,062+
Great Expectation	Released: March 23, 2004; Label: Future Flow; Formats: CD, cassette; Track listing Part 1: 1. 파괴본능; 2. Kool as Ice; 3. 비밀일기; 4. 데미안; 5. 전화; 6. 이야기 속으로 IV; 7. As You Like It; 8. 일탈; 9. 썩은 XXX2 (변태여우); 10. Kiss My Ass; 11. 소리바다 항해하던 어느날 밤 12. 소음공해; 13. 2U, Playa Hataz III; 14. 아침 (Prelude); Part 2: 1. Show Must Go On..; 2. Frozen; 3. Club Night; 4. 친구여 (feat. Insooni); 5. So Nice (PD Remix, feat. MRJ); 6. (When I Need...) Somebody (feat. Yuna); 7. Great Expectation (What It Takes 2 B Me); 8. 파라다이스 (feat. Soy); 9. Autumn Breeze; 10. Church 2 Da Streets; 11. Daydream (Interlude); 12. Luv Flow; 13. My Song 2	9	KOR: 53,840+
Money Talks	Released: October 22, 2007; Label: Future Flow; Formats: CD; Track listing: 1. Season 6; 2. Make It Hot; 3. Korea City; 4. 내 생의 나날; 5. 첫사랑; 6. Money Over Life; 7. 나이테; 8. 된장 신드롬; 9. 럭셔리 신드롬; 10. 추월선; 11. Music is Dead; 12. Pride	6	KOR: 17,364+
Part 1: State of the Art	Released: October 12, 2011; Label: Brand New Stardom; Formats: CD, digital download; Track listing: 1. I'm Ur Dream (2008); 2. The Wall (2010); 3. WW III (2009); 4. Confession (2009); 5. PPL R PPL (2008); 6. Do Or Die (2010) (feat. Basick); 7. We R History (2008); 8. Where I'm From (2010) (feat. Dok2, Mino); 9. The Doctors (2010) (feats Swings, San E); 10. Thrilla (2010) (feat. Zico, Park Kyung, Hanhae); 11. And The Winner Is… (2010) (feat. Zico, Outsider); 12. Ratz N Snitches Interlude (2010) (feat. Verbal Jint); 13. Ratz N Snitches (2011); 14. Same Shit Different Day (2006); 15. Letter (2007); 16. Back On The Map (2007)	31	—N/a
Part 2: Art of Business	Released: October 12, 2011; Label: Brand New Stardom; Formats: CD, digital download; Track listing: 1. 공부하세요 (2004); 2. Dreams Come True (2004); 3. Family Man (2009) (feat. Lee Tae-il of Block B); 4. Hey June (2005); 5. Take A Bow (2009) (feat. Kimmaster); 6. Sense Of Time (2010); 7. Cloud (2006); 8. Fever II (2011) (feat. Skull, Park Kyung, P.O); 9. Bitch (2006) (feat. Jubee of Sunny Hill); 10. Time (2006); 11. Designer's Rock (2005); 12. 랄라랜드 (2010) (feat. JeA and Narsha); 13. Devil's Advocate (2007); 14. Mother Earth (2010); 15. Red And Green Pills (2009); 16. Life Goes On (2006)	32	—N/a

=== Extended plays ===
Title	Album details	Peak chart positions	Sales
Title	Album details	KOR	Sales
Victory	Released: March 8, 2010; Label: Brand New Stardom; Formats: CD, digital download; Track listing: 1. 한국힙합에 바란다 (feat. 블록버스터); 2. 보란듯이 (feat. 정슬기); 3. 빅토리 2010 (feat. Koreana); 4. 가을의 전설 (feat. Humming Urban Stereo); 5. R.O.K (with Insooni); 6. 가을의 전설 (Inst.); 7. R.O.K (Inst.); 8. 빅토리 2010 (Inst.); 9. Sex Sex Sex (feat. 샛별); 10. 빅토리 2010 (Song Ver.) (feat. Koreana)	20	—N/a
The Hard Way with Verbal Jint	Released: April 15, 2010; Label: Brand New Stardom; Formats: CD, digital download; Track listing: 1. Map Music (feat. Zico); 2. Super Hero (feat. Venus); 3. Man Up (feat. Park Mi-Kyung); 4. Origin of the Species (feat. Swings, Blockbuster); 5. Map Music (instrumental); 6. Super Hero (instrumental); 7. Man Up (instrumental); 8. Origin of the Species (instrumental)	10	—N/a
In Stardom V3.0	Released: September 16, 2013; Label: Stardom Entertainment; Formats: CD, digital download; Track listing: 1. Intro: Resume; 2. 달라진 건 없어 (feat. Jinggo of Super Kidd, Deepflow); 3. It was a very good year (feat. Deez); 4. Made in 이태원 (feat. Jinbo); 5. 이건 아니지 않나 싶어; 6. 썩은 XXX 3	25	KOR: 987+
The Goose That Lays Golden Eggs Part 1 (황금알을 낳는 Part 1)	Released: March 18, 2015; Label: Stardom Entertainment; Formats: CD, digital download; Track listing: 1. 영혼 없다; 2. Candy (feat. Bada); 3. My Style (feat. Kidoh, Sangdo, Seogeung, KURO, X); 4. 친구여 (feat. Son Seung-yeon)	23	—N/a

== Awards and nominations ==
=== Mnet Asian Music Awards ===
Year	Category	Work	Result
2002	Music Video of the Year (daesang)	"My Style"	Won
2002	Best Hip Hop Performance	"My Style"	Nominated
2002	Special Jury Prize	"My Style"	Nominated
2003	Best Hip Hop Performance	"Secret Diary" (비밀일기)	Nominated
2003	Special Jury Prize	"Secret Diary" (비밀일기)	Won
2004	Best Hip-Hop Video	"Friend" (feat. Insooni)	Won
2005	Judges' Choice Award	"My Old Story" (나의 옛날 이야기)	Won
