= Deez (musician) =

South Korean musician (born 1984)

- 디즈
- Born: Jo Hyun-chul; April 23, 1984 (age 42)
- Citizenship: South Korea
- Occupations: Singer; songwriter; record producer
- Years active: 2000s–present
- Musical career
- Genres: R&B; neo soul
- Instrument: Vocals
- Labels: Sony/ATV; Ekko
- Member of: Soultriii

Korean name
- Hangul: 조현철
- RR: Jo Hyeoncheol
- MR: Cho Hyŏnch'ŏl

Jo Hyun-chul (Korean: 조현철; born April 23, 1984), also known professionally as Deez (디즈; stylized in all caps), is a South Korean singer-songwriter and record producer. Considered a pioneer of the South Korean neo soul scene, his discography primarily encompasses R&B and soul.

Deez developed an interest in music production at a young age and spent his high school years networking within entertainment agencies. He first gained recognition in 2008 for his songwriting contributions to Rain's sixth studio album, Rainism, leading him to sign with Sony/ATV Music Publishing. His debut extended play, Envy Me (2009), and first studio album, Get Real (2010), achieved little commercial success but earned critical acclaim, with Get Real's lead single, "Sugar", winning the Korean Music Award for Best R&B/Soul Song.

After fulfilling his mandatory military service, Deez shifted his focus to producing for other artists, signing with Ekko Music Rights and forming the music production team Soultriii. He became a prominent songwriter for major K-pop acts such as Shinee, Exo, Red Velvet, and NCT.

== Life and career ==
=== 1984–2008: Early life and career beginnings ===
Born on April 23, 1984, Deez took piano lessons from a young age but did not particularly enjoy them, preferring to play along with songs by ear without sheet music. His passion for R&B music was inspired by listening to his mother's record collection, which included American artists such as Michael Jackson, Marvin Gaye, and Prince among others. Although he initially aspired to become a diplomat and keep music as a hobby, he shifted his focus toward a professional musical career when his family's financial situation worsened. Deez began actively pursuing music around his second year of middle school, taking an interest in music production. He initially created music using only a guitar and a keyboard, before purchasing the necessary MIDI equipment at the Nakwon Musical Instrument Arcade with money saved from working manual jobs. He was self-taught through practical application and subsequently developed an interest in singing. He said that "music sustained [him] through [his] adolescence" and that he "might have gone down the wrong path" without it.

While attending high school in Bucheon, Deez affiliated with various entertainment companies to gain connections in the music industry, collaborating with the record producer Yoo Gun-hyung, among others, and training at a major entertainment agency to join an idol group. However, he became disillusioned by the controlling environment and left the company, choosing to pursue his interest in R&B independently and becoming a vocal and composition teacher. Although he frequently considered quitting music before his first release, teaching students gave him the determination to keep pursuing his passion. Deez featured on the track "We" from BMK's debut studio album, No More Music, in 2003. He began gaining recognition in 2008 for his songwriting contributions to Rain's sixth studio album, Rainism, having composed the tracks "Only You" and "You". One of Rain's record producers had heard Deez working on his own tracks and invited him to submit a demo for the artist. Having been looking for a new partner well-versed in R&B, Rain liked the demo and invited him to collaborate, leading Deez to sign as a songwriter with Sony/ATV Music Publishing.

=== 2009–2011: Envy Me and Get Real ===
Deez independently released his debut extended play (EP), Envy Me, on March 27, 2009, supported by the singles "My Light" and "Go!", the latter featuring the rapper Verbal Jint. He self-funded and produced the EP over nearly a year, writing around 50 songs before selecting the final tracks with the help of fellow musicians like Kaystah. After repeatedly postponing its release, he decided that if he was going to quit music, he might as well release Envy Me as it was. The EP achieved little commercial success but earned critical acclaim, with The Hankyoreh and Rhythmer stating that Envy Me showcased a high level of musical skill rarely seen in a newcomer. It earned two nominations at the 7th Korean Music Awards and was named as the Best R&B Album of the Year by Rhythmer. Reflecting on the release, Deez said that he did not expect the EP to attract such attention and that he was not fully satisfied with how its second half had turned out. After listening to Envy Me, representatives at Sony/ATV were surprised by its contrast to the tracks that he had written for Rainism but liked the record, ultimately prompting the company to finance his next release.

Deez enlisted to fulfill his mandatory military service on April 27, 2010, ahead of the release of his first studio album, Get Real, scheduled for the following May. Initially intended as a single, the project evolved into an extended play at the suggestion of Sony/ATV representatives upon hearing the demo, before eventually becoming a full-length studio album. Deez stated that he completed the arrangement, recording, session work, mixing, and mastering within a month and a half by working around 22 hours a day, which led to a severe deterioration of his health. He decided to include the tracks "My Light", "Devil's Candy", and "I Just Need You" from Envy Me on the new record due to the time constraints. He had initially planned to hold the album's release until after his military service, but Sony/ATV and his peers persuaded him to proceed earlier. In early May, Sony/ATV exclusively partnered with Rhythmer to release a preview of the track "Soul Tree". Get Real was released on May 13 to critical acclaim, with several critics describing it as an album that could rival American R&B and neo soul productions. The lead single, "Sugar", topped the Cyworld real-time chart and won the Korean Music Award for Best R&B/Soul Song, with the selection committee member Park Young-woong calling the song "a masterpiece" and praising the phonetic rhymes and Deez's vocal performance.

=== 2012–present: Transition to K-pop production ===
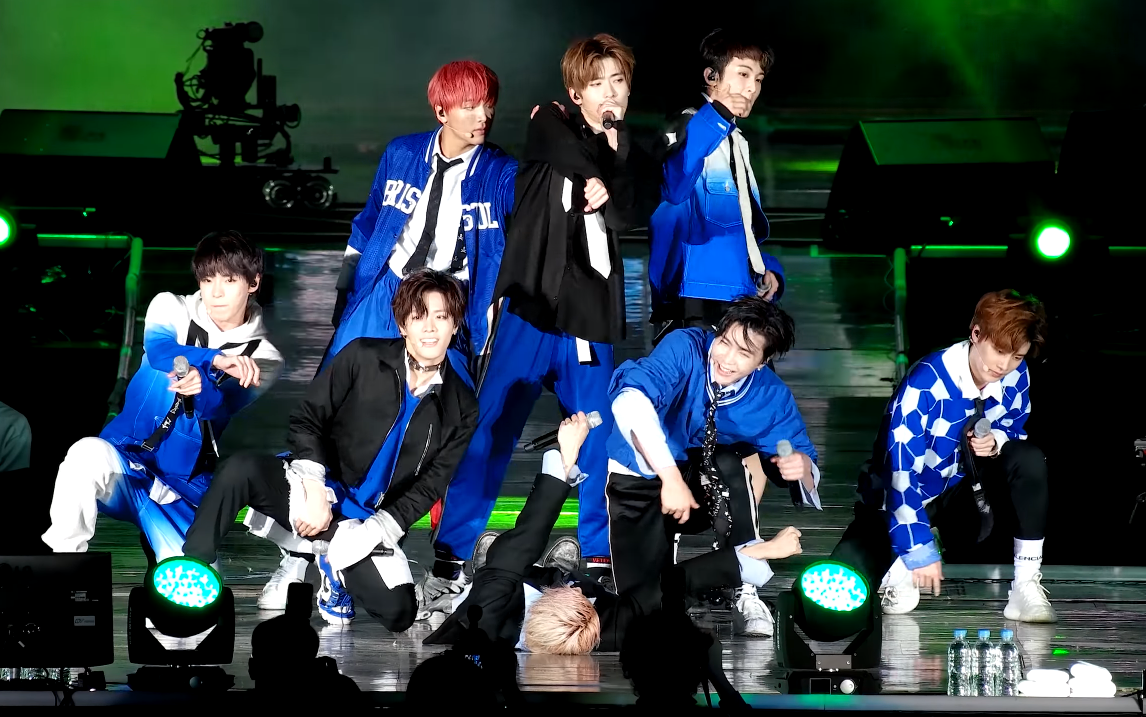
Deez co-wrote the singles "Cherry Bomb" (2017), "Touch" (2018), and "Kick It" (2020) for NCT 127 (pictured).

After being discharged in February 2012, Deez set up his own recording studio and stated that he planned to release a second studio album with songs that he had written during his military service, as well as new tracks. However, inspired by the figure of Quincy Jones and desiring to focus on studying music, he instead began accepting songwriting requests from numerous record labels. In a 2010 interview with Music Y, he had also expressed a desire to help elevate the mainstream Korean music scene. One of his earliest collaborations with a major entertainment company came in 2012 with JYP Entertainment, when he contributed to Jang Wooyoung's first EP, 23, Male, Single, and Miss A's second EP, Independent Women Part III. That same year, he featured on the track "High End Girl" from Primary's debut studio album, Primary and the Messengers, which reached number 96 on the Gaon Music Chart. By 2015, he served as chief producer at Stardom Entertainment.

Deez later signed with Ekko Music Rights, formed the music production team Soultriii, and gained further recognition as a songwriter and vocal director for prominent K-pop artists, particularly SM Entertainment's acts such as Shinee, Exo, Red Velvet, Taemin, Jonghyun, and NCT. One of the singles he co-wrote for NCT 127, "Cherry Bomb" (2017), earned a nomination for Best Pop Song at the Korean Music Awards and was featured on Melon and the Seoul Shinmun's list of the top 100 K-pop songs of all time. Deez has also closely collaborated with the former EvoL member Saay and the NCT member Haechan over the course of their solo careers.

== Artistry ==
=== Musical style and influences ===
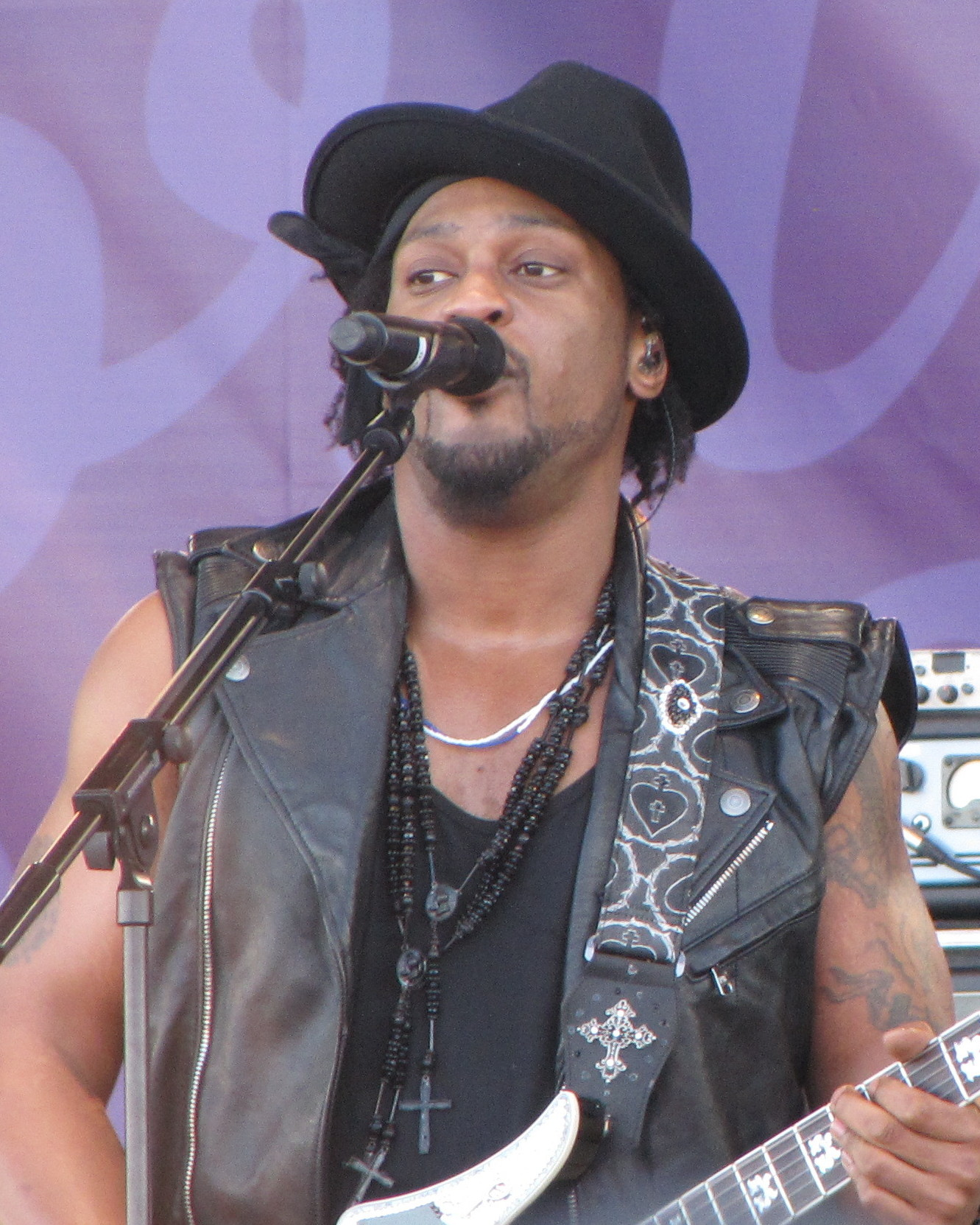
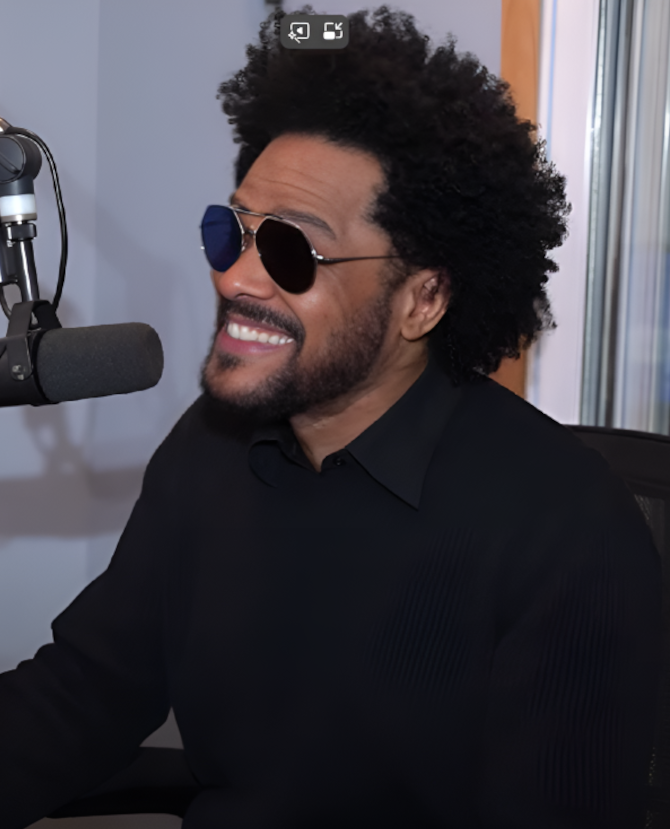
Deez named D'Angelo (left) and Maxwell (right) among his influences.

While Envy Me blended neo soul in its first half with a more mainstream R&B sound in the latter sections, Get Real marked Deez's full transition into the neo soul genre. The critic Kim Young-dae described Get Real as an album that "only the generation that grew up listening to the soul and hip-hop of the mid-to-late 1990s, unaffected by so-called 'K-pop', [could] understand and share", remarking that its arrangements, instruments, brass sounds, and verse-bridge structure mirrored those of American neo soul artists like Maxwell or D'Angelo. Deez himself has cited Stevie Wonder, Michael Jackson, Boyz II Men, All-4-One, Eric Benet, D'Angelo, Musiq Soulchild, Maxwell, and Rahsaan Patterson among his influences, and has also said that he enjoys Earth, Wind & Fire and the Isley Brothers. Critics praised Deez for his rhythmic sense, balanced production, falsettos, and choruses. The critic Kim Bong-hyun also remarked on his ability to fully "[utilize] space" in a song and his care in tailoring the lyrics to Korean phonetic patterns so that the vocals blend with the beat.

=== Songwriting ===
When songwriting, Deez said that he prioritizes the rhythm, focusing on the instrumental balance and the ensemble's overall arrangement to complement it. He also pays close attention to chorus arrangements. For Get Real, he placed significant emphasis on vocal arrangements, relying heavily on improvisation rather than pre-arranged structures to capture a specific "feel", which resulted in recording sessions lasting over 24 hours per song. He also struggled to write the lyrics for the album, noting that aligning the words with his intended artistic nuances was difficult because even a minor change in pronunciation could obscure his message.

Discussing his work for K-pop artists, Deez stated that he does not usually write for specific acts or chase mainstream trends, focusing instead on crafting "good R&B songs" that leave a "lasting impression". He believes that staying true to his musical foundation has allowed him to maintain his unique artistic identity while sustaining a "steady" career. Kim Young-dae agreed that the significance of Deez's songs lies in the historically rooted context they possess, rather than serving as "temporary", "passing" fads. Reflecting on his collaborative approach to songwriting, Deez said that he enjoys working with other musicians and encourages junior artists to do the same, in contrast to the "anguish" he experienced while working largely alone on Get Real. Kim Young-dae singled out Deez's collaborations with Dem Jointz, Daniel "Obi" Klein, and Charli Taft as a standout.

== Legacy ==
Deez has been recognized as a pioneer of South Korea's neo soul scene, credited with being one of the first artists to introduce the genre to the country. A member of the selection committee for the Korean Music Awards, Lee Byung-ju, stated that, up to Deez's debut, R&B and soul had only emerged under the guise of "Korean-style" pop ballads, often reduced to slow-tempo tracks sang in a heavy, strained vibrato technique. Shortly after Get Real's release, the Taiwanese singer-songwriter Jolin Tsai expressed admiration for Deez's music, saying that it was "truly surprising that such high-quality songs [had] emerged in the Asian music market, where soul and R&B [were] not yet mature". Kim Young-dae questioned whether the album constituted a mere reinterpretation of R&B and soul in Deez's signature style, or if it marked the first step toward a distinct, Korean-style evolution of the genres.

In a 2025 article for Art Insight, Kim Seon-woo opined that the domestic R&B scene had yet to produce a new neo soul artist comparable to Deez, even 15 years after his last album, remarking that signature tracks such as "Devil's Candy", "I Just Need You", and "Sugar" still left a "sophisticated impression" with a "timeless and stylish" production.

== Discography ==
=== Studio albums ===
List of studio albums, with selected details
Title	Details
Get Real	Released: May 13, 2010; Labels: Sony/ATV, Universal Music; Track listing: 1. "Intro (Get Real)"; 2. "Soul Tree"; 3. "Makin Luv"; 4. "Sugar"; 5. "Skit"; 6. "Devil's Candy" (2010 remastered); 7. "My Light" (나의 빛; 2010 remastered; featuring Han Ha-eum); 8. "I Just Need You" (너 하나면 돼; 2010 remastered; featuring Lucy); 9. "Interlude (8 Bit)"; 10. "Love Is Pain"; 11. "Soul Tree" (rap version; featuring Huckleberry P); 12. "Outro (Free)"

=== Extended plays ===
List of extended plays, with selected details
Title	Details
Envy Me	Released: March 27, 2009; Labels: Lighted Theatre, Mirrorball Music; Track listing: 1. "Introduction (Envy Me)"; 2. "My Light" (나의 빛); 3. "Devil's Candy"; 4. "Go!" (featuring Verbal Jint); 5. "Intermission (Where U R)"; 6. "No?" (아니?); 7. "I Just Need You" (너 하나면 돼); 8. "One, Two, Three" (featuring Choice37)

=== Singles ===
List of singles, with year of release and associated album
Title	Year	Album
"My Light" (나의 빛)	2009	Envy Me
"Go!" (featuring Verbal Jint)	2009	Envy Me
"Sugar"	2010	Get Real

=== Other appearances ===
List of other credited appearances, with year of release, selected chart positions, sales, and associated album
Title	Year	Peak chart positions	Sales	Album
Title	Year	KOR	Sales	Album
"We" (우리)	2003	—	—N/a	No More Music
"Mob's Like Jagger" (Noise Mob featuring Deez)	2012	—	—N/a	M.O.B
"High End Girl" (하이엔드걸) (Primary featuring Deez)	2012	96	KOR: 56,264	Primary and the Messengers
"It Was a Very Good Year" (Cho PD featuring Deez)	2013	—	—N/a	In Stardom V3.0

== Awards and nominations ==
List of awards and nominations, with name of the award, year of ceremony, recipient, category, and result of the nomination
Award	Year	Recipient	Category	Result	Ref.
Gwangju Youth Music Festival	2007	Deez	Silver Award for Producing	Won	
Korean Music Awards	2010	Envy Me	Best R&B/Soul Album	Nominated	
Korean Music Awards	2010	"Devil's Candy"	Best R&B/Soul Song	Nominated	
Korean Music Awards	2011	Get Real	Best R&B/Soul Album	Nominated	
Korean Music Awards	2011	"Sugar"	Best R&B/Soul Song	Won	
Yepp Music Tuning Awards	2007	Deez	Big Hit Award	Won	
