= Topp Dogg =

South Korean boy band

- Also known as: Xeno-T (2018-2021)
- Origin: South Korea
- Genres: K-pop; hip hop
- Years active: 2013–2021
- Labels: Stardom; Hunus; HY (Japan)
- Spinoffs: Topp Dogg G; Under Dogg
- Past members: Seogoong; Gohn; Kidoh; Jenissi; P-Goon; Nakta; Hansol; A-Tom; Sangdo; Hoojoon; B-Joo; Xero; Sangwon

Topp Dogg (Korean: 탑독), also known briefly as Xeno-T (Korean: 제노티), was a South Korean boy band. The group consists of five members: Hojoon, Sangdo, B-Joo, Xero and Sangwon. Originally a thirteen-member group created by Cho PD in 2013 under Stardom Entertainment, the group moved to Hunus Entertainment, following Stardom Entertainment's merger with the company. After multiple line-up changes, the remaining five members subsequently changed their name to XENO-T in 2018.

As Topp Dogg, the group released one studio album, four EPs, three repackages, eight singles and had three soundtrack appearances.

== Career ==
=== 2012–2013: Pre-debut mixtapes and debut with Dogg's Out ===
Mixtapes were released in March and April 2012 to promote the group before debut. The members were officially introduced in October 2013 and the group held a debut showcase on October 22, 2013.

On October 22, 2013, they released their debut music video for lead single "Follow Me (말로해)", and a day later released their debut EP, Dogg's Out. Topp Dogg released a repackaged version of Dogg's Out on December 12, which included the title track "Cigarette" and a Chinese version of "Follow Me".

=== 2014: Arario and AmadeuS ===
On January 13, 2014, Stardom Entertainment released a teaser for Topp Dogg's second EP. On January 15, Topp Dogg made their comeback with the release of the music video to title track "Open the Door" and a second song entitled Arario was released the next day. The music video for "Arario" was released on February 12, serving as the title track of their repackaged EP, which was released February 24.

On June 9, it was revealed that Topp Dogg would be releasing their third EP, AmadeuS, with the title track "TOPDOG". However, a few days before the release, the entire album was leaked on the internet. The label attempted to remove the songs, and later took legal action against the culprit.

On August 25, Topp Dogg released a repackage of AmadeuS with three new tracks and a short film showing fans the behind the scenes footage of the AmadeuS photoshoot.

For their first anniversary, Topp Dogg released a new "old school" song, "Annie" (short for "Anniversary"), on October 16.

=== 2015: The Beat and line-up changes ===
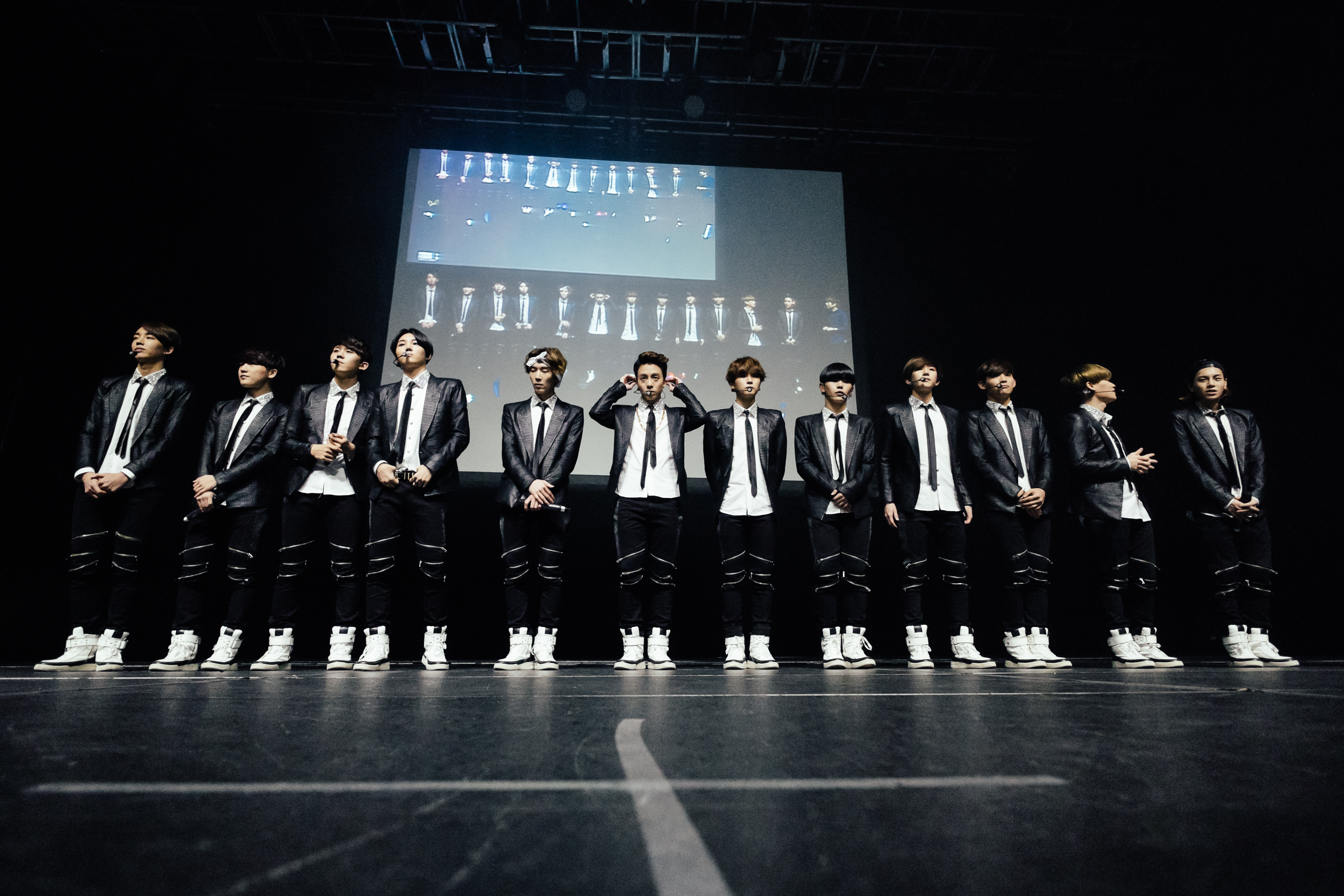
Topp Dogg's First Showcase 2015 Live in U.S., Houston

After months of Seogoong seemingly being on hiatus, he posted a message on Twitter and on Topp Dogg's official fancafe, revealing that he would be moving from Topp Dogg to its sub-unit "Under Dogg" so that he could "cover a broader musical spectrum". He began working under the sub-unit on January 16.

Concerts for their American tour were held in Houston, Texas; Miami Beach, Florida; and Atlanta, Georgia during February 2015.

As of July 2015, Topp Dogg was moved to Hunus Entertainment after their former company Stardom Entertainment had been acquired and merger by Hunus Entertainment.

On October 8, Hunus Entertainment released a statement after numerous rumors were surfacing over Kidoh and Gohn filing lawsuits against the company for "mismanagement of their careers" as the two members wanted to expand their careers. The statement confirmed the rumors that Gohn and Kidoh had both tried to file lawsuits against the company

Before the release of their fourth EP, Hunus Entertainment released four teaser videos over the course of two weeks leading up to the release date of "Emotion", "O.A.S.I.S", "All Eyez on Me", and "The Beat". On October 19, Topp Dogg released their fourth EP, The Beat, along with a music video for the title track of the same name. The EP peaked at number 22 on the Gaon Album Chart, selling 3,000+ copies.

=== 2016: Show Me the Money 5, Jenissi's departure and First Street ===
On March 3, Topp Dogg released an OST for the TV series Come Back Mister; the track was also given a music video featuring the members recording the song. Two more songs were released for the drama by Topp Dogg members—the first being "Back Then" by Hojoon, released on March 31, and the second being "You" by Hojoon and Sangdo, released on April 7.

Topp Dogg's rap line (Yano, A-Tom and Jenissi) took part in season five of the popular rap survival show, Show Me the Money, which began airing in May. A-Tom passed the audition process and made it to round two where he was eliminated. Shortly after A-Tom released a song to his SoundCloud entitled "So Blind", which was later uploaded to Hunus Entertainment's YouTube account on May 20. Both Yano and Jenissi failed to pass the audition round.

It was announced in May that Topp Dogg would be taking part in a web series created by K-Pop news website Soompi called Topp Dogg: All-Kill. The show ran for 10 episodes, from May 23 to August 15, and aired on Mondays—it featured the members taking part in various "challenges" every week, such as cooking and charades, and featured special segments such as a dorm tour.

On October 31, they released a comeback teaser for their first studio album First Street, as nine members instead of the previous ten, on that same day it was confirmed that Jenissi will be leaving the group to pursue solo activities, the agency confirmed that he didn't renew his contract, The teaser of "Rainy Day" was released on October 31. The album along with the music video for the title track were released on November 7, 2016.

=== 2017: Produce 101 Season 2, line-up changes and The Unit ===
On February 28, 2017 Hunus Entertainment announced that A-Tom had temporary left the group to participate in Produce 101 Season 2 under his birth name, Kim Sang-gyun. He was eliminated in 26th place during the third elimination round.

On September 29, Hunus Entertainment released a statement on the group's fan cafe, announcing that five members (Sangdo, Xero, B-Joo, Yano, and Hojoon) would be participating in the reality television series The Unit. A-Tom was announced to be debuting with the Produce 101 fan-created group, JBJ and his future activities with Topp Dogg had remained to be discussed after his activities with JBJ came to an end. Following promotions for their first studio album, First Street, On that same day it was confirmed that Hansol, P-Goon and Nakta will be leaving the group at the end of the half of the month after they decided not to renew their contracts, Hansol intended to join the military. His contract with Hunus is to be discussed once he is discharged. P-Goon also planned to enlist in the military, with plans to pursue an acting career upon being discharged. Nakta had decided to terminate his contract to pursue a solo career.

In October 2017, the remaining five members joined the audition process for The Unit, with only Hojoon and B-Joo passing. Hojoon was eliminated in 39th place during the second elimination round while, B-Joo was eliminated in 25th place during the third elimination round.

=== 2018: Reformation as XENO-T ===
On February 21, it was announced via Topp Dogg's official fan cafe that the group were starting fresh, as a new group under the name of Xeno-T. The name is a combination of "xenogeneic" and "top-class", the latter being a tribute to their fandom, "ToppKlass". The post revealed that the group wanted a new start to showcase themselves better as a group and show new sides to themselves. It was also announced that B-Joo would be changing the Korean writing of his stage name, and that Yano would now be promoting under his birth name, Sangwon. Hunus later confirmed that A-Tom would not be joining the group once his activities with JBJ came to an end.

XENO-T officially debuted in Japan with their first Japanese single, "どこにいても" (Wherever You Are) on May 30, along with the release of the music video.

== Members ==
=== Former ===
- Seogoong (서궁)
- Kidoh (키도)
- Gohn (곤)
- Jenissi (제니씨)
- P-Goon (P군)
- Nakta (낙타)
- Hansol (한솔)
- A-Tom (아톰)
- Hojoon (호준)
- Sangdo (상도)
- B-Joo (비쥬)
- Xero (제로)
- Sangwon (상원) (formerly known as Yano)

== Discography ==
=== Studio albums ===
Title	Album details	Peak chart positions	Sales
Title	Album details	KOR	Sales
Topp Dogg
First Street	Released: November 7, 2016; Label: Hunus Entertainment; Format: CD, digital download; Track listing: 1. Perfume; 2. Rainy Day; 3. Sunshine; 4. Monologue; 5. Flower; 6. Blind; 7. Good Morning; 8. Emotion (Glitch Mix); 9. Rainy Day (Instrumental); 10. Sunshine (Instrumental)	16	KOR: 4,146

=== Extended plays ===
Title	Album details	Peak chart positions	Sales
Title	Album details	KOR	Sales
Topp Dogg
Dogg's Out	Released: October 24, 2013; Label: Stardom Entertainment; Format: CD, digital download; Track listing: 1. Dogg's Out; 2. Follow Me (말로해); 3. A Girl Like You (너 같은 여자) (Kidoh solo); 4. Cute Girl (귀여운 걸); 5. Playground	17	KOR: 2,691
Dogg's Out	Dogg's Out (Repackage): Released: December 12, 2013; Label: Stardom Entertainment; Format: CD, digital download; Track listing: 1. Dogg's Out; 2. Follow Me (말로해); 3. Cigarette; 4. A Girl Like You (너 같은 여자) (Kidoh solo); 5. Cute Girl (귀여운 걸); 6. Playground; 7. Say It (Chinese ver.)	16	KOR: 2,474
Arario	Released: January 16, 2014; Label: Stardom Entertainment; Format: CD, digital download; Track listing: 1. Arario (아라리오); 2. Open the Door (들어와); 3. R-Uh (알어); 4. Fever (종말론자); 5. Open the Door (Inst.)	12	KOR: 4,485
Arario	Arario Special Edition (Repackage): Released: February 24, 2014; Label: Stardom Entertainment; Format: CD, digital download; Track listing: 1. Arario (아라리오); 2. Keep Smiling; 3. Open the Door (들어와); 4. R-Uh (알어); 5. Fever (종말론자); 6. Arario (아라리오) (Remix); 7. R-Uh (알어) (Japanese ver.); 8. Arario (아라리오) (Inst.)	11	KOR: 6,394
AmadeuS	Released: June 9, 2014; Label: Stardom Entertainment; Format: CD, digital download; Track listing: 1. Intro; 2. Amadeus (아마데우스); 3. Topdog; 4. Salieri (살리에리); 5. Topdog (Instrumental)	5	KOR: 7,650
AmadeuS	Amadeus Deluxe Edition (Repackage): Released: August 22, 2014; Label: Stardom Entertainment; Format: CD, digital download; Track listing: 1. Intro; 2. Amadeus (아마데우스); 3. Topdog; 4. Salieri (살리에리); 5. Topdog (Instrumental); 6. Ain't Right (이건 아니지 않나 싶어) (feat. Cho PD); 7. Oh My Baby; 8. Peekaboo	8	KOR: 3,768
The Beat	Released: October 19, 2015; Label: Hunus Entertainment; Format: CD, digital download; Track listing: 1. Runaway; 2. The Beat; 3. O.A.S.I.S; 4. All Eyez On Me; 5. Emotion; 6. Sweetheart	8	KOR: 4,987

=== Singles ===
Title	Year	Peak positions		Sales	Album
Title	Year	KOR	JPN	Sales	Album
ToppDogg
Korean
"Follow Me" (말로해)	2013	—	—N/a	—N/a	Dogg's Out
"Cigarette"	2013	—	—N/a	—N/a	Dogg's Out
"Open the Door" (들어와)	2014	—	—N/a	—N/a	Arario
"Arario" (아라리오)	2014	—	—N/a	—N/a	Arario
"Topdog"	2014	—	—N/a	—N/a	AmadeuS
"Annie" (애니)	2014	—	—N/a	—N/a	Non-album single
"The Beat"	2015	—	—N/a	—N/a	The Beat
"Rainy Day"	2016	—	—N/a	—N/a	First Street
XENO-T
Japanese
"Dokoni Itemo" (どこにいても)	2018	—N/a	32	JPN: 2,187	Non-album single

=== Original soundtracks ===
Year	Title	Albums
2015	"Butterfly Core"	Detective Conan 13th Season OST
2015	"Get out of My Way"	Webtoon Dokgo OST
2016	"Feel Alive"	Come Back Mister OST

=== Music videos ===
Year	Title	Director(s)
Topp Dogg
2013	"Follow Me"	Kwon Soon-wook (Metaoloz)
2013	"Cigarette"	Kwon Soon-wook (Metaoloz)
2014	"Open the Door"	Kwon Soon-wook (Metaoloz)
2014	"Arario"	Kwon Soon-wook (Metaoloz)
2015	"Topdog"	Kwon Soon-wook (Metaoloz)
2015	"I Come"	Julia Ashley
2015	"Peekaboo"	Julia Ashley
2015	"Annie"	Park Sang-woo & Seong Won-mo (Digipedi)
2015	"The Beat"	Kim Se-hee (August Frogs)
2016	"Rainy Day"	Lee Ki-baek (Tiger Cave)

== Awards and nominations ==
Year	Award	Category	Recipient	Result
2014	MTV Europe Music Awards	Best Korean Act	Topp Dogg	Nominated
2015	21st Republic of Korea Entertainment Art Awards	Best Rookie Award	Topp Dogg	Won
2015	KMC Radio Awards 2014	Best Male Dance Performance	Topp Dogg	Won
