= Come Back Mister =

2016 South Korean TV series

- Promotional poster
- Also known as: Please Come Back, Mister; Come Back, Uncle; Come Back, Ahjussi; Come Back Alive
- Genre: Melodrama; Comedy; Fantasy; Romance
- Based on: Mr. Tsubakiyama's Seven Days by Jirō Asada
- Written by: Noh Hye-young
- Directed by: Shin Yoon-sub
- Starring: Rain; Oh Yeon-seo; Kim In-kwon; Kim Soo-ro; Lee Min-jung; Lee Hanee; Ji Ha-yoon; Choi Won-young; Yoon Park
- Country of origin: South Korea
- Original language: Korean
- No. of episodes: 16

Production
- Running time: 60 minutes
- Production companies: Shinyoung E&C Group; Hunus Entertainment

Original release
- Network: SBS
- Release: 24 February – 14 April 2016

Come Back Mister (Korean: 돌아와요 아저씨; RR: Dorawayo ajeossi) is a 2016 South Korean television series starring Rain, Oh Yeon-seo, Kim In-kwon, Kim Soo-ro, Lee Min-jung, Lee Hanee, Choi Won-young and Yoon Park, based on the Japanese novel published in 2002, Mr. Tsubakiyama's Seven Days by Jirō Asada. It aired on SBS from 24 February to 14 April 2016 on Wednesdays and Thursdays at 21:55 for 16 episodes.

== Synopsis ==
Kim Young-soo (Kim In-kwon) is a section chief in the women's apparel section at Sunjin's department store. He and his wife Shin Da-hye (Lee Min-jung) do not get along because his long work hours and constant overtime distract him from home. During one of these overtimes, he accidentally falls from a roof and is killed. His company writes his death off as a suicide in order to not receive blame for overworking him.

Han Gi-tak (Kim Soo-ro) is a former gangster who runs a restaurant. He has loved actress Song Yi-yeon (Lee Ha-nui) for many years, but she has always distanced herself from him because of his lifestyle. Her ex-husband, Cha Jae-gook (Choi Won-young) has whipped up a scandal to force her to give him their child, and threatens Yi-yeon with it. Just as Gi-tak figures this out, he gets in a car accident and is killed at the same time as Young-soo.

Young-soo and Gi-tak both arrive in the afterlife, but they both feel that they must return: Young-soo to reconcile with his wife and prove his death was not a suicide, and Gi-tak to protect Yi-yeon. They are given two months and return to life in new bodies: Young-soo as Lee Hae-joon (Rain), a handsome young man; and Gi-tak as Han Hong-nan (Oh Yeon-seo), a beautiful young woman. They have three rules:

- They can not reveal their true identities.
- Revenge is forbidden.
- They cannot engage in human affairs.

If any of these rules are broken, the fact that either of them ever existed will be erased.

== Cast ==
=== Main characters ===
- Rain as Lee Hae-joon / Kim Young-soo

A handsome young man. Kim Young-soo reincarnated in Lee Hae-joon's body.

- Oh Yeon-seo as Han Hong-nan / Han Gi-tak

A beautiful young woman. Han Gi-tak reincarnated in Han Hong-nan's body.

- Kim In-kwon as Kim Young-soo

Shin Da-hye's husband. An assistant manager at women's apparel section at Sunjin's Department Store. After he died, he reincarnated himself as Lee Hae-joon.

- Kim Soo-ro as Han Gi-tak
  - Kwak Dong-yeon as young Han Gi-tak

A former gangster who runs a restaurant. He has loved actress Song Yi-yeon. After he died, he reincarnated himself as Han Hong-nan. He is Shin Da-hye's long lost brother.

- Lee Min-jung as Shin Da-hye

Kim Young-soo's wife. Jung Ji-hoon's ex-girlfriend. After her husband died, she worked as a worker at Sunjin's Department Store. She is Han Gi-tak's long lost sister.

- Lee Hanee as Song Yi-yeon
  - Ji Ha-yoon as young Song Yi-yeon

A famous actress who struggles after scandal. She is Han Gi-tak's love interest.

- Yoon Park as Jung Ji-hoon

Shin Da-hye's ex-boyfriend and biological father of Kim Han-na. Worked under Kim Young-soo. After Kim Young-soo died, he was promoted to assistant manager at Sunjin's Department Store.

- Choi Won-young as Cha Jae-gook

The president of Sunjin's Department Store and Song Yi-yeon's ex-husband.

- Lee Tae-hwan as Choi Seung-jae

Han Gi-tak former partner as gangster and Song Yi-yeon's bodyguard.

=== Supporting characters ===
- Park In-hwan as Kim Noh-gap

Kim Young-soo's father.

- Lee Re as Kim Han-na

Daughter of Kim young-soo and Shin Da-hye.

- Oh Dae-hwan as Na Suk-chul

Natural enemy of Han Gi-tak.

- Kang Ki-young as Jegal Gil

Han Gi-tak's employee at his restaurant.

- Ra Mi-ran as Maya

A worker for Re-Life Centre, who controls and watches over Lee Hae-joon and Han Hong-nan's actions.

- Yoon Joo-sang as Stationmaster of Re-Life Centre
- Go In-bum as Jang Jin-goo

A big boss who always prioritizes Han Gi-tak over Na Suk-chul.

- Ahn Suk-hwan as Cha Hee-jang

President of Sunjin Group.

- Oh Na-ra as Secretary Wang / X (unidentified spy)

A secretary and interpreter for the Sunjin Group's president.

- Park Min-woo as Yoo Hyuk

A model who is used by Cha Jae-gook to be involved with Song Yi-yeon's scandal.

- Ryu Hwa-young as Wang Joo-yeon

A young actress who really hates Song Yi-yeon.

- Lee Moon-sik as Pilot

Flies the real Lee Hae-joon but unfortunately gets into a plane crash and is found to be surviving in an isolated island.

- Park Chul-min as Ma Sang-sik

== Production ==
The first script reading took place on 22 December 2015 in Seoul, South Korea.

== Original soundtracks ==
=== Part 1 ===
Come Back Mister Original Soundtrack

Soundtrack album by Various Artists
- Genre: Soundtrack
- Label: Hunus Entertainment; CJ E&M Music

Track listing
No.	Title	Artist	Length
1.	"Again" (다시)	Noel	4:57
2.	"Again" (Inst.)	Noel	4:57

=== Part 2 ===
Track listing
No.	Title	Artist	Length
1.	"Feel Alive"	Topp Dogg	2:28
2.	"Feel Alive (Rap Ver.)"	Topp Dogg	2:28

=== Part 3 ===
Track listing
No.	Title	Artist	Length
1.	"Moon Light"	Son Hoyoung	4:25
2.	"Moon Light (Inst.)"	Son Hoyoung	4:25

=== Part 4 ===
Track listing
No.	Title	Artist	Length
1.	"Because It's Love" (사랑이니까)	Ailee	3:08
2.	"Because It's Love (Inst.)"	Ailee	3:08

=== Part 5 ===
Track listing
No.	Title	Artist	Length
1.	"Close My Eyes"	Lee Hyun	3:55
2.	"Close My Eyes" (Inst.)	Lee Hyun	3:55

=== Part 6 ===
No.	Title	Artist	Length
1.	"Sadness of Love"	Na Yoon Kwon	4:25
2.	"Back Then"	Hojoon (Topp Dogg)	3:53
3.	"Sadness of Love" (Inst.)	Na Yoon Kwon	4:25
4.	"Back Then" (Inst.)	Hojoon (Topp Dogg)	3:53

=== Part 7 ===
Track listing
No.	Title	Artist	Length
1.	"X-Out"	Ryu Ji Hyun	3:46
2.	"You"	Sang Do & Ho Joon (Topp Dogg)	3:34
3.	"X-Out" (Inst.)	Ryu Ji Hyun	3:46
4.	"You" (Inst.)	Sang Do & Ho Joon (Topp Dogg)	3:34

== Epilogue ==
The epilogue shows the life of the real Lee Hae-joon and his pilot surviving on an isolated island. Lee Hae-joon wants to fly back to Seoul because he has an important business, but unfortunately he gets into a plane crash. The epilogue is shown in Episode 3, 4, 7, 9, 10, 11, 12, 14 and 15.

== Ratings ==
In the table below, the blue numbers represent the lowest ratings and the red numbers represent the highest ratings.

Episode #	Original broadcast date	Average audience share			
Episode #	Original broadcast date	TNmS Ratings		AGB Nielsen	
Episode #	Original broadcast date	Nationwide	Seoul National Capital Area	Nationwide	Seoul National Capital Area
1	24 February 2016	8.0%	10.5%	6.6%	7.6%
2	25 February 2016	9.0%	11.4%	7.6%	8.9%
3	2 March 2016	6.2%	8.0%	5.2%	6.0%
4	3 March 2016	6.9%	7.8%	5.5%	6.1%
5	9 March 2016	5.2%	5.7%	5.2%	5.7%
6	10 March 2016	5.9%	6.4%	5.4%	5.9%
7	16 March 2016	3.9%	4.5%	4.0%	4.2%
8	17 March 2016	4.7%	6.4%	4.0%	4.2%
9	23 March 2016	3.1%	3.8%	3.5%	3.8%
10	24 March 2016	3.6%	4.4%	4.1%	4.4%
11	30 March 2016	2.3%	2.8%	3.3%	3.6%
12	31 March 2016	3.7%	3.9%	3.8%	4.0%
13	6 April 2016	2.6%	2.7%	2.8%	2.9%
14	7 April 2016	3.6%	4.4%	3.2%	3.0%
15	14 April 2016	4.5%	4.8%	4.6%	4.9%
16	14 April 2016	3.1%	3.3%	2.6%	2.4%
Average		4.8%	5.6%	4.5%	4.9%

- Episode 15 was postponed to 14 April 2016 in favor of coverage of the National Assembly elections.
- Episodes 15 & 16 aired back-to-back on 14 April.

== International broadcast ==
=== Indonesia, Malaysia and Singapore ===
The drama aired on pay-TV channel ONE in Malaysia, Singapore and Indonesia with localised subtitles, within 24 hours of the original South Korean broadcast, from 25 February 2016 until 15 April 2016. It also airs in Indonesia on Rajawali Television (RTV). Net Mediatama later shows to promote the drama which will air on 15 February 2021.

=== Vietnam ===
It aired in Vietnam on HTV3 beginning 1 November 2016.

=== United States ===
The drama airs in the Los Angeles DMA free, over-the-air on Asian American channel LA 18 KSCI-TV (channel 18) with English subtitles, Wed-Thurs 9:15PM, beginning 16 March 2016.

== Awards and nominations ==
Year	Award	Category	Recipient	Result
2016	5th APAN Star Awards	Best Supporting Actress	Oh Yeon-seo	Nominated
2016	24th SBS Drama Awards	Excellence Award, Actor in a Fantasy Drama	Kim In-kwon	Nominated
2016	24th SBS Drama Awards	Excellence Award, Actress in a Fantasy Drama	Oh Yeon-seo	Won
2016	24th SBS Drama Awards	Special Acting Award, Actor in a Fantasy Drama	Yoon Park	Nominated
2016	24th SBS Drama Awards	Special Acting Award, Actress in a Fantasy Drama	Lee Ha-nui	Nominated
2016	24th SBS Drama Awards	Special Acting Award, Actress in a Fantasy Drama	Ra Mi-ran	Nominated
2016	24th SBS Drama Awards	Idol Academy Award – Best Eating	Oh Yeon-seo	Nominated
