= Kick It (NCT 127 song) =

2020 single by NCT 127

- iScream remix cover

Single by NCT 127

from the album Neo Zone
- Language: Korean; English
- Released: March 6, 2020
- Recorded: 2019–2020
- Studio: SM Booming System (Seoul); Golden Bell Tree Sound (Seoul)
- Genre: Hip hop; R&B
- Length: 3:53
- Label: SM; Scream
- Composers: Dwayne "Dem Jointz" Abernathy Jr.; Deez; Mayila Jones; Rodnae "Chikk" Bell; Ryan S. Jhun; Yoo Young-jin
- Lyricists: Wutan; Rick Bridges; danke (lalala Studio)

NCT 127 singles chronology
"Highway to Heaven" (2019)	"Kick It" (2020)	"Punch" (2020)

NCT singles chronology
"Love Talk" (2019)	"Kick It" (2020)	"Ridin'" (2020)

Music video
- "영웅 (英雄; Kick It)" on YouTube

"Kick It" (Korean: 영웅; Hanja: 英雄; RR: Yeongung; lit. 'Hero') is a song recorded by South Korean boy band NCT 127. It was written by Wutan, Rick Bridges and Danke of Lalala Studio, composed by Dem Jointz, Deez, Mayila Jones, Rodnae "Chikk" Bell, Ryan S. Jhun and Yoo Young-jin, and arranged by Jointz, Deez and Yoo. Described as a "high-energy" song with "inspirational lyrics" that portrays the group's musical identity, it was released as the lead single from their second studio album Neo Zone on March 6, 2020 by SM Entertainment. An accompanying martial arts-themed music video premiered two days prior.

Music critics noted the song's "darkness" and "anthemic" return, in contrast to their previous singles, and believed it contributed to the group's musical diversity. Commercially, the song became NCT 127's first top-thirty entry on Gaon Digital Chart, as well as their first top-ten entry on the Billboard K-pop Hot 100, peaking at number nine. It also entered at number three on the Billboard World Digital Songs chart and became the group's second entry on the New Zealand Hot Singles chart. NCT 127 promoted the song on several South Korean music programs in addition to their online concert via Beyond Live, titled Beyond the Origin.

== Background and release ==
After wrapping up promotional activities in the United States by the end of November 2019, SM Entertainment uploaded a music video for "Dreams Come True", along with the release announcement for Neo Zone on January 27, 2020. The label further confirmed that member Jungwoo would return to the group following his hiatus since August 2019. On February 12, a "timeline" video for the album was posted on the group's social media accounts, including a release schedule and confirmation of the title of the lead single as "영웅 / 英雄 (Kick It)". Following video previews of other album tracks, the music video teaser for "Kick It" was uploaded on the official SM Town channel on March 3, 2020. The full video premiered one day later and was released digitally alongside the rest of Neo Zone on March 6, 2020.

== Composition ==
=== Writing and development ===
"Kick It" was composed by American producer Dem Jointz, South Korean songwriter Deez, Ryan S. Jhun, Mayila Jones and Rodnae "Chikk" Bell, with Yoo Young-jin contributing to co-composition and arrangement. The song marked the second time that Dem Jointz, Deez and Yoo wrote together for the boy group since "Cherry Bomb" in June 2017. In an interview with music critic Kim Young-dae in March 2020, Deez stated that "Kick It" was originally prepared to "gird the loins" for "Cherry Bomb 2.0", opining that the outcome ended up being "stronger" than the 2017 single. He further revealed that the production team had to "revise and multiply" the song many times from end of December 2019 to early February 2020. Dem Jointz created the song's beat loop, and Deez focused on the R&B arrangement, having constructed the bridge and dance break sections with the goal of "maintaining" the "harmonic vocal color" and "extensively energetic" chord work to bring out a "trendy and old-school" feel to the song. Members Taeyong and Mark mostly rapped their respective parts in one-takes to their preferences, and the qualified cuts were arranged later.

=== Music and lyrics ===
"Kick It"
"Kick It" is a song described as "powerful" hip hop dance record with heavy metal guitar riff and R&B elements.

Musically, SM Entertainment described the song as a "powerful" hip-hop dance record with heavy metal guitar riff and R&B elements throughout, while Tamar Herman of Billboard called the track "high-energy" with industrial beats, throbbing bass, whistling synths and chanting shouts. The song is composed in the key of F# minor and set in common time at a moderate tempo of 167 beats per minute. Excerpts of the song, including the harmonization and main riff, were also incorporated into the initially unreleased instrumental prelude of Neo Zone.

Lyrically, the song sees the members overcome their own "fears and traumas." The group also compares themselves to Bruce Lee when onstage, mentioning him in chantings such as "Bass kicks swingin' like Bruce Lee" and referring to Jeet Kune Do and his film Enter the Dragon. The song was penned by Wutan, Rick Bridges and Lalala Studio writing team member Danke.

== Music video ==
Directed by South Korean director Oui Kim, the music video for "Kick It" has a martial arts theme. Set in the "Neo Oriental" mood virtual space of "Neo Zone", the video tells the story of overcoming trauma, while seeing the members reborn as powerful "heroes", living up to the song's original Korean title. The martial arts, action movie-influenced choreography was created by choreographer Koosung Jung, who revealed that member Taeyong also contributed some of the "action scenes" to the overall performance. Three other versions were made available on the NCT 127's Youtube channel, including a visualiser version on March 8, vertical version on March 16 and choreography-only performance video on March 19.

== Promotion ==
Following the music video release, the group shared their first performance for "Kick It" as NCT 127 The Stage through their official channel on March 5. One day later, the group had their first music show performance on Music Bank, followed by promotions on Show! Music Core and Inkigayo. NCT 127 eventually earned their first Music Bank trophy for the track on March 27, 2020. Along with other album tracks, "Kick It" was part of the group's setlist for Beyond the Origin, an online live concert via streaming service Beyond Live on May 17, 2020.

As part of the group's promotions in the United States, the song was first performed on March 10 at Houston Livestock Show and Rodeo, where NCT 127 became the very first K-pop act to perform at the event. It was reported that the group would embark on their first U.S. arena tour, Neo City – The Awards, to promote the single and Neo Zone album starting from June 6 at New York City's Madison Square Garden; the tour was subsequently postponed due to the COVID-19 lockdown.

== Critical reception ==
Professional ratings
Review scores
Source	Rating
IZM	3/5 stars

Following its initial release, "Kick It" received generally positive reviews from music critics. Giving the song three stars out of five, writer Hwang Sun-eob of IZM noted the song was "going too hard", but complimented its "level of balance" with both the rapping and singing performance of the group. Tamar Herman of Billboard magazine called the track "high-energy", while Jeff Benjamin of Forbes praised the noise-pop influence of the song as "impactful", and noted its R&B influence that "set the stage" for Neo Zone.

Another review from SoundDigest called the track "rambunctious", while writer Alexis Hodoyan-Gastelum from Consequences of Sound noted the song's metal influence and the "darkness, anthemic" return to some of their early releases. Writer Vandana Pawa of Teen Vogue gave the song a positive review, citing "Kick It" as a representation of both the group's sonic origin and development in the near future. In an interview with the song's producer Deez, music critic Kim Young-dae said the song was a "masterpiece" that continued the legacy of "Cherry Bomb," while not being "as complicated" as the 2017 single. He also praised the song as "dynamic" and "more airtight and dense" with "thick texture and soulful verse of sophisticated harmony."

=== Accolades ===
"Kick It" received one music show award on the March 27, 2020, broadcast of Music Bank. It was nominated for Best Dance Performance – Male Group at the 2020 Mnet Asian Music Awards. Publications who ranked the song among the best K-pop songs of 2020 include JoyNews24 (5th), Sanook (10th), Tonplein (11th), Paper (20th), and Time (unranked).

== Commercial performance ==
"Kick It" saw an improvement in chart performance compared to the group's previous releases. With one day of tracking, the song debuted at number 68 on the Gaon Digital Chart in the week of March 7, 2020, before peaking at number 21 the following week. It became the group's first top-thirty entry on the chart. The song ranked at number 36 on the monthly Gaon Digital Chart for March and at number 131 in the 2020 mid-year issue. On the K-pop Hot 100, the song became the group's first top-ten entry, reaching a peak of number nine, following 46-spot jump from the week prior.

Elsewhere, the song debuted at number three on the US Billboard World Digital Songs chart, NCT 127's eighth top-five entry and third to debut and peak at the same position, following "Cherry Bomb" (2017) and "Superhuman" (2019). It also became their fourth appearance on the Billboard Japan Hot 100 and third on the New Zealand's Hot 40 Singles Chart, peaking at number eighty-four and number thirty-eight, respectively.

== Remixes ==
With the EDM label ScreaM Records announcing their iScreaM project on May 4, 2020, remixes for "Kick It" were released on May 8, 2020. It was the first single of the project, containing three different remixes by American DJ Valentino Khan, Minimonster and labelmate Hitchhiker (who also helped produce the track "Mad Dog" on Neo Zone).

== Formats and track listing ==
iScreaM Vol. 1, Kick It (Remixes) - Single

1. "Kick It" (Valentino Khan Remix) – 3:09
2. "Kick It" (MINIMONSTER Remix) – 3:47
3. "Kick It" (Hitchhiker Remix) – 3:10

== Credits and personnel ==
Credits adapted from the liner notes of Kick It and Punch.

Studio

- SM Booming System – recording, digital editing, engineered for mix
- Golden Bell Tree Sound – recording
- SM LVYIN Studio – digital editing, engineered for mix
- doobdoob Studio – digital editing
- SM Blue Ocean Studio – mixing
- 821 Sound – mastering

Personnel

- SM Entertainment – executive producer
- Lee Soo-man – producer
- Lee Sung-soo – production director
- Kim Young-min – executive supervisor
- Nam So-young – executive supervisor
- NCT 127 – vocals
  - Taeil – background vocals
  - Doyoung – background vocals
  - Haechan – background vocals
- Wutan – lyrics
- danke (Lalala Studio) – lyrics
- Rick Bridges – lyrics
- Dwayne "Dem Jointz" Abernathy Jr. – composition, arrangement
- Deez – composition, arrangement, vocal directing
- Mayila Jones – composition
- Rodnae "Chikk" Bell – composition
- Ryan S. Jhun – composition
- Yoo Young-jin – composition, arrangement, vocal directing, background vocals, recording, digital editing, engineered for mix, music and sound supervisor
- Kim Kwang-min – recording
- Lee Ji-hong – digital editing, engineered for mix
- Jang Woo-young – digital editing
- Kim Cheol-sun – mixing
- Kwon Nam-woo – mastering

== Charts ==
=== Weekly chart ===
Chart (2020)	Peak position
Japan (Japan Hot 100)	84
New Zealand Hot Singles (RMNZ)	38
Singapore (RIAS Regional)	16
South Korea (Gaon)	21
South Korea (K-pop Hot 100)	9
US World Digital Song Sales (Billboard)	3

=== Monthly chart ===
Chart (2020)	Peak position
South Korea (Gaon)	36

== Certifications ==
Region	Certification	Certified units/sales
Brazil (Pro-Música Brasil)	Gold	20,000^{‡}
^{‡} Sales+streaming figures based on certification alone.

== Release history ==
Region	Date	Format	Label
Various	March 6, 2020	Digital download; streaming	SM
Various	May 8, 2020	Digital download; streaming	SM; ScreaM

== See also ==
- List of Music Bank Chart winners (2020)
