= Stardom Entertainment =

South Korean music record label acquired 2015

Stardom 스타덤
- Company type: Private
- Industry: Popular music
- Genre: K-pop, hip hop, dance, pop, teen pop, R&B
- Predecessor: Brand New Stardom
- Founded: 2009
- Founder: Cho PD
- Defunct: July 2015
- Fate: acquired by and merged into Hunus Entertainment
- Successor: Hunus Entertainment
- Headquarters: Doksan-dong, Geumcheon District, Seoul, South Korea
- Number of locations: 1
- Key people: Artists: Block B, EvoL
- Production output: Music albums
- Services: Entertainment agency
- Owner: Cho PD

Stardom Entertainment (Korean: 스타덤) (formerly known as Brand New Stardom Entertainment) was a music record label based in South Korea. Founded by South Korean entertainer Cho PD during mid-2009, the company was renamed Stardom Entertainment when it split into Stardom Entertainment and Brand New Music.

In July 2015, it was acquired by Hunus Entertainment.

== History ==
The company was originally established in 1998 by Cho PD to distribute his own albums after his debut. The name was changed to Future Flow after the release of his third album and the label went on to discover and debut artists such as Ra.D and Dok2.

Future Flow was closed due to some discord within the label but later incorporated into the Brand New Stardom merger. Brand New Music artists used to be joined with Brand New Stardom until Rhymer split off from Brand New Stardom and brought artists with him to Brand New Music. The company name was then changed to Stardom Entertainment.

In February 2011, it was announced that Cho PD would be spending $1.4 million USD to create a seven-member hip hop group under his "Creating Korea's Eminem Project." The group debuted under the name "Block B" on April 15, 2011 while the company was still known as Brand New Stardom.

After the separation from "Brand New Music," a new five-member girl group was announced in March 2012. The group was initially intended to debut in April through a variety show, their debut date was delayed until August 2012. The group garnered much interest prior to their debut from both domestic and international fans. The group went through member changes before the final line-up was released. On August 10, 2012, the group was debuted under the name "EvoL."

== Former artists ==
- A-Man
- BNR
- Bizniz (2009–2011)
- Block B (2011–2013)
  - B-Bomb (2011–2013)
  - Jaehyo (2011–2013)
  - Lee Tae-il (2011–2013)
  - Park Kyung (2011–2013)
  - P.O (2011–2013)
  - U-Kwon (2011–2013)
  - Zico (2011–2013)
- EvoL (2012–2015)
  - Hayana (2012–2015)
  - Im Yuri (2012–2015)
  - Kim Junhee (2012–2015)
  - Kim Yeonju (2012–2015)
  - Saay (2012–2015)
- Jung Seul-gi
- Keeproots
- Miss $ (2008–2015)
  - Jace (2008–2015)
  - Minhee (2008–2015)
  - Yumi (2008–2015)
  - Hyeyoung (2008–2015)
- Ra.D
- Rhymer
- Skull (2008–2015)
- Tae Hye-young
- Topp Dogg (2013–2015)
  - A-Tom (2013–2015)
  - B-Joo (2013–2015)
  - Gohn (2013–2015)
  - Hansol (2013–2015)
  - Hojoon (2013–2015)
  - Jenissi (2013–2015)
  - Kidoh (2013–2015)
  - Nakta (2013–2015)
  - P-Goon (2013–2015)
  - Sangdo (2013–2015)
  - Seogoong (2013–2015)
  - Xero (2013–2015)
  - Yano (2013–2015)
- Verbal Jint (2010–2011)
