= Kidoh =

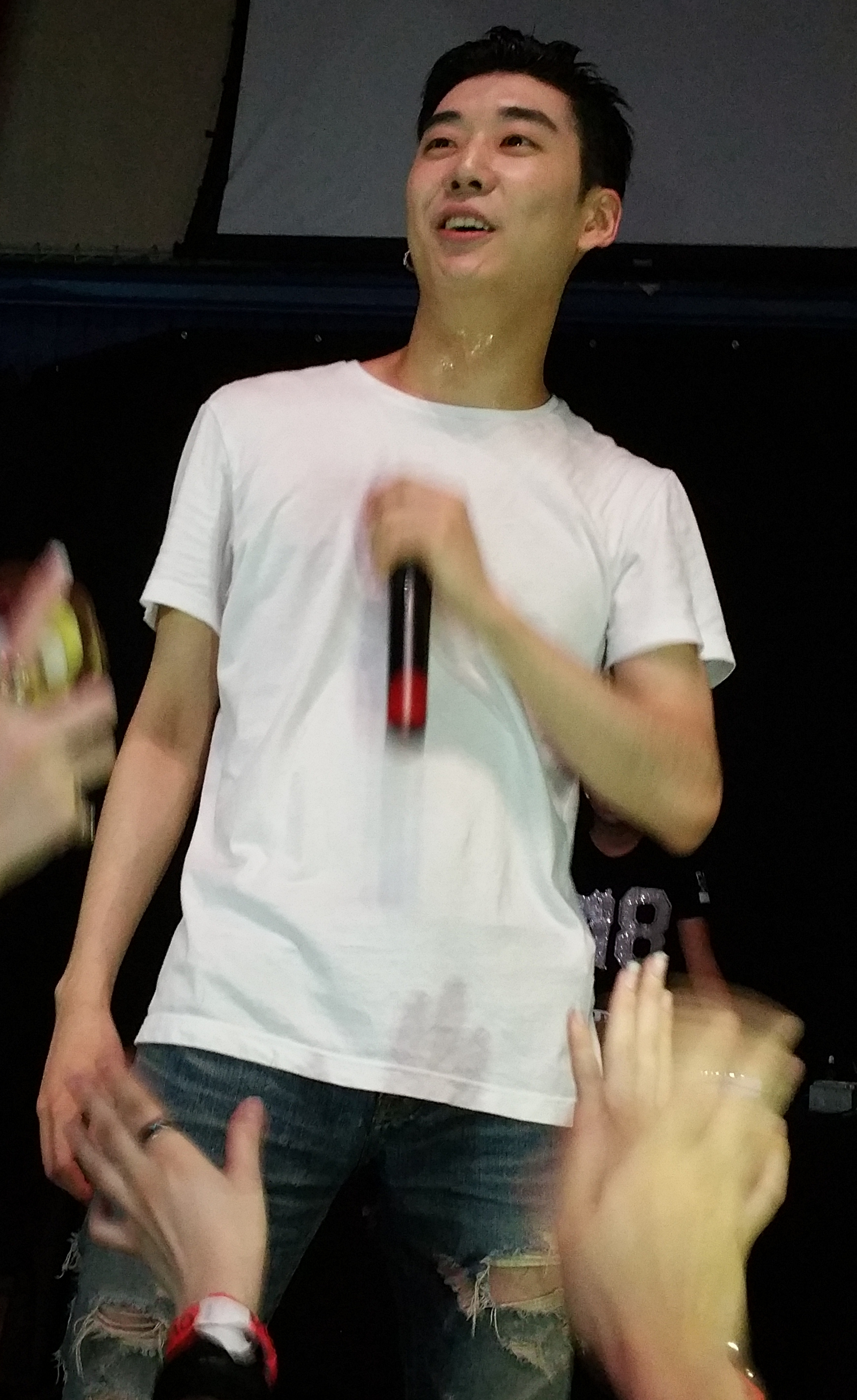
- Fort Lauderdale concert, December 2016.

Background information
- Born: Jin Hyo-sang; December 16, 1992 (age 33); Seoul, South Korea
- Genres: Hip hop, R&B, K-pop
- Occupations: Singer; songwriter; dancer; rapper; record producer
- Years active: 2013–present
- Labels: Nextlevel; Hunus; Stardom
- Member of: Rockbottom; Daenamhyup
- Formerly of: Topp Dogg

Korean name
- Hangul: 진효상
- RR: Jin Hyosang
- MR: Chin Hyosang

Jin Hyo-sang (Korean: 진효상, born December 16, 1992), more commonly known by his stage name Kidoh (키도) is a South Korean singer, rapper, and producer. He was a member of the South Korean boy band Topp Dogg, and the first Topp Dogg band member to release a solo album. He has been active member of South Korean hiphop crews called Rockbottom and Daenamhyup for several years.

== Biography ==
=== Early years ===
Kidoh studied at the Hankuk University of Foreign Studies. Initially, Kidoh wanted to become a music producer. Later, he received a call from Brave Brothers, who influenced Kidoh to consider a more diverse musical career. Kidoh's career began in a trainee role with Big Hit Entertainment, in preparation for membership in the musical group BTS (방탄소년단).

=== Stardom Entertainment ===
Kidoh's first appearance with Topp Dogg was on the television show Show Champion, on October 22, 2013, performing a title that he produced (Say It, 말로해).

=== Nextlevel Record Label ===
On May 10, 2017, Kidoh released a single "헐 (HER)" under the record label Nextlevel. The full album "School of Hard Knocks" was planned to be released May 25, 2017, but was delayed until an unknown date.

== Discography ==
=== Extended plays ===
Title	Album details	Peak chart positions	Sales
Title	Album details	KOR	Sales
Mini Album (작은 앨범)	Released: September 26, 2014; Label: Stardom Entertainment; Format: CD, digital download	7	KOR: 3,502
S.O.H.K	Released: June 19, 2017; Label: Next Level Entertainment; Format: CD, digital download	—	—N/a

=== Singles ===
Title	Year	Peak chart positions	Sales	Album
Title	Year	KOR	Sales	Album
"Taxi on the Phone" with Sangdo of Topp Dogg	2014	—	—N/a	Mini Album
"Her" feat. Simo	2017	—	—N/a	S.O.H.K
"Weed You"	2017	—	—N/a	S.O.H.K
