= EvoL =

South Korean girl group

- Origin: South Korea
- Genres: K-pop; Hip-hop; R&B
- Years active: 2012–2015
- Label: Stardom Entertainment
- Past members: Yull; Jucy; Saay; Hayana; J-Da

EvoL (Korean: 이블) was a five-member South Korean girl group under the label Stardom Entertainment. They released their debut EP and music video for the track "We Are a Bit Different (우린 좀 달라; Urin Jom Dalla)" on August 10, 2012. In August 2015, the group unofficially disbanded, following Yull, Hayana and J-Da's departures.

== History ==
=== Pre-debut ===
In March 2012, Cho PD announced the upcoming girl group. Although initially intended to debut in April through a variety show, their debut date was changed to August 2012. The group garnered much interest prior to their debut from both domestic and international fans. The group went through member changes before the final line-up was released. Saay and J-Da made an appearance in labelmate Block B's music video "NanlinA", alongside two other former members of the group, Song Kwanghee and Lee Dasom, the latter a former member of the girl group Tahiti. Jucy was also an underground rapper known as "Juni.J", and had released a few self-written tracks. On July 12, 2012, EvoL's first audio teaser was released, followed by a series of both video and audio teasers that showcased a sample of songs from their EP.

=== 2012: Let Me Explode! ===
On August 10, 2012 the group released their EP "폭파해줘! (Let Me Explode!)" and an MV for the single "우린 좀 달라 (We Are A Bit Different)". The album consists of five tracks and is available on CD and also for digital download. On August 16, 2012, EvoL made their stage debut with their single "우린 좀 달라 (We Are A Bit Different)" on M!Countdown.

=== 2013–2015: Second EvoLution, Show Me the Money and disbandment ===
On December 13, 2012, Saay tweeted a photo of herself and the other members, with the caption: "It's New EVOL! 보고싶어 많이많이 Guyz how do u do~we miss u so so much..Thanks 4 waiting us. We'll meet u r expectation soon".

On March 6, 2013, EvoL announced their official comeback set for March 18, releasing teaser images of Saay and Hayana, while J-DA, Yull and Jucy's teasers were released two days later. EvoL then released several tracks from their 2nd mini-album ‘Second Evolution’ on March 18 at noon, with the digital album release on March 19. The offline release of the album was set for March 20. EvoL showed their “crab dance” choreography in the music video for their title track “Get Up“ and released a short 30-second clip teaser of member J-DA riding a mechanical bull.

In the summer of 2013, Jucy released a mixtape, and in May 2015, she joined the cast of Show Me The Money (seasons 2 and 4), only to be eliminated very early on in the competition.

During the summer of 2015 rumors appeared on fansites alleging that Saay's contract with Stardom had expired and that she had left EvoL (while still remaining with Stardom Entertainment), and would redebut as a solo artist. Fans also alleged favouritism from Cho PD on Saay's behalf, claiming that they had given her special treatment (giving her time off, allowing her to skip group performances, etc.). Cho PD and Stardom Entertainment have never responded officially to these claims.

In August 2015, it was revealed that Yull, Hayana and J-Da had had their contracts terminated without their knowledge during Stardom's merge with Hunus Entertainment, thus effectively disbanding the group.

== Last known lineup ==
- Jucy (쥬시)
- Saay (세이)

=== Former ===
- Yull (율) (now known as Yuri)
- Hayana (하야나) (now known as BÉBE YANA)
- J-Da (제이다) (now known as YeonJoo)

== Discography ==
=== Extended plays ===
Title	Album details	Peak chart positions	Sales
Title	Album details	KOR	Sales
Let Me Explode (폭파해줘)	Released: August 10, 2012; Label: Stardom Entertainment; Format: CD, digital download; Tracks list: 1. Let Me Explode (폭파해줘); 2. I'm Sorry; 3. Magnet; 4. We Are A Bit Different (우린 좀 달라)"; 5. 1,2,3,4,5	20	KOR: 1,597
Second Evolution	Released: March 19, 2013; Label: Stardom Entertainment; Format: CD, digital download; Tracks list: 1. Get Up; 2. Love; 3. Magnet; 4. I'm Sorry; 5. Get Up (White Dress Remix); 6. Get Up (Inst.)	12	KOR: 1,428

=== Singles ===
Title	Year	Album
"We Are A Bit Different" (우린 좀 달라)	2012	Let Me Explode
"Get Up"	2013	Second Evolution
