= Seoul Jazz Festival =

Music festival in Seoul, South Korea

- Genre: Jazz festival
- Dates: May
- Location: Seoul
- Years active: 2007–present
- Website: http://www.seouljazz.co.kr

The Seoul Jazz Festival (Korean: 서울재즈페스티벌) is an annual jazz festival which takes place in the city of Seoul, South Korea. The festival spans across two or three days. Famous jazz artists from all around the world gather in Seoul every May to perform and enjoy jazz music with crowd. The year of 2016 was the festival's 10th anniversary.

== History ==
Year	Date	Venue
2007	May 31 - June 1	Sejong Center
2008	May 21-24	Sejong Center
2009	May 14-17	Sejong Center
2010	May 11-12	Sejong Center
2010	May 14-15	Olympic Park
2011	May 9-12	Sejong Center
2012	May 19-20	Olympic Park
2013	May 17-18	Olympic Park
2014	May 16-18	Olympic Park
2015	May 23-25	Olympic Park
2016	May 28-29	Olympic Park
2017	May 27-28	Olympic Park
2018	May 19-20	Olympic Park
2023	May 26-28	Olympic Park
