= Kim Young-dae (critic) =

South Korean music critic (c. 1977–2025)

Kim Young-dae (Korean: 김영대; c. 1977–December 24, 2025) was a South Korean music critic. He gained recognition as one of the most prominent experts on K-pop, idols and the Korean Wave, credited for first analyzing the global popularity of Psy's "Gangnam Style" (2012) and the international rise of BTS starting from 2017 in domestic and international publications such as Vulture and MTV News.

After graduating with a degree in business administration from Yonsei University, he earned a doctorate in ethnomusicology from the University of Washington and began his career in the mid-1990s writing on online platforms. He went on to host Korean television broadcasts of award ceremonies such as the Billboard Music Awards, American Music Awards, and Grammy Awards, and served as a selection committee member for the Korean Music Awards and a judge for the MAMA Awards. He was also a founding member of the online music magazine Idology and hosted the podcast Rolling Pod and the YouTube channel School of Music. Following his passing in 2025, several prominent figures in the South Korean music industry expressed their condolences, including Yoon Jong-shin, Kim Hyeong-seok, Lim Hyung-joo, Woo Hye-rim, Jung Yong-hwa, Kim Ho-young, and Lee Ji-ae.

== Bibliography ==
- BTS: The Review (2019)
- Idols as Artists in the K-Pop Era (2021)
- The Songwriters (2025)
