= NCT Life =

- Genre: Variety show
- Starring: NCT
- Country of origin: South Korea
- Original language: Korean

Production
- Production location: South Korea
- Production company: S.M. Culture & Contents

Original release
- Network: Naver TV Cast; Oksusu; KBS Joy; V LIVE
- Release: April 16, 2016 – August 30, 2021

NCT Life (Korean: 엔시티 라이프) is a series of Korean variety show featuring South Korean boy band NCT. Currently, it spans eleven different seasons. The title of the show is a portmanteau that combines "NCT Lifestyle" and "City Life".

== Synopsis ==
Members of the group show off their daily lives, letting audiences see into NCT's promotional activities while traveling.

== Cast ==
- 1st season: Taeil, Hansol, Johnny, Taeyong, Yuta, Doyoung, Ten, Jaehyun, Mark, Jeno, Haechan, Jaemin, Jisung
- 2nd season: Taeyong, Yuta, Kun, Doyoung, Jaehyun, Winwin
- 3rd season: NCT 127
- 4th season: Taeil, Taeyong, Yuta, Doyoung, Ten, Jaehyun, Winwin
- 5th season: NCT Dream (Renjun, Jeno, Chenle, Jisung)
- 6th season: NCT 127 (Johnny, Taeyong, Doyoung, Ten, Jaehyun)
- 7th season: NCT 127 (Taeil, Taeyong, Doyoung, Winwin, Yuta)
- 8th season: Johnny, Yuta, Kun, Winwin, Lucas, Mark
- 9th season: NCT 127 (Taeil, Johnny, Yuta, Doyoung, Jaehyun, Haechan)
- 10th season: NCT Dream (Renjun, Jeno, Jaemin, Chenle, Jisung)
- 11th season: NCT 127

== Season ==
Season	Title	Run	Episodes	Description	Ref.
1	NCT Life in Bangkok	April 16 – May 2, 2016	6	Focuses on SM Rookies and their journey to debut.	
2	NCT Life in Seoul	May 21 – June 11, 2016	7	Introduces the two new Chinese members Winwin and Kun. Features the members touring around Seoul and completing missions.	
3	NCT Life in Paju	July 16 – August 20, 2016	5	Features the NCT 127 members planning and carrying out leisure activities in Paju.	
4	NCT Life: Korean Food King Challenge	October 22 – November 26, 2016	6	Under the guide of master chef Kwon Woo-jung, the members learn how to make "the top-10 Korean dishes loved by foreigners". A collaboration with Ministry of Culture, Sports, and Tourism to spread Korean culture.	
5	NCT Life: Entertainment Retreat	March 4–19, 2017	6	Features 4 members of NCT Dream on a getaway, along with Super Junior's Leeteuk and Shindong.	
6	NCT Life in Chiangmai	March 25 – April 9, 2017	6	Features members touring Chiangmai, with Ten as a guide.	
7	NCT Life in Osaka	June 14 – July 22, 2017	21	Features 5 members of NCT 127 touring Osaka, with Yuta as a guide.	
8	NCT Life: Hot & Young Seoul Trip	July 23, 2018 – August 17, 2018	12	Features foreign members touring Seoul, with Johnny as a guide.	
9	NCT Life in Chuncheon and Hongcheon	December 9, 2019 – January 17, 2020	18	Features member touring in Chuncheon and Hongcheon to do activities and relaxing	
10	NCT Life: DREAM in Wonderland	July 6, 2020 – August 11, 2020	12	Features 5 NCT Dream members escaping the city to complete missions in order to reach "Wonderland"	
11	NCT Life in Gapyeong	August 30, 2021	12	Features the NCT 127 members.	

== Broadcasting platforms ==
=== Korea ===
- Naver TV Cast
- V Live
- MBC Music (Season 1-3)
- KBS Joy (Season 7)
- Oksusu
- seezn

=== China ===
- Youku
- Tudou
- Ali Music

=== Thailand ===
- True4U
- LINE TV

=== Taiwan ===
- MTV
