= Universe (NCT album) =

- Digital cover

Studio album by NCT
- Released: December 14, 2021
- Recorded: 2021
- Studio: SM Studios (Seoul)
- Genres: Hip-hop; R&B; EDM
- Length: 45:49
- Languages: Korean; English
- Labels: SM; Dreamus

NCT chronology
Sticker (2021)	Universe (2021)	Glitch Mode (2022)

NCT studio albums chronology
NCT 2020 Resonance (2020)	Universe (2021)	Golden Age (2023)

Singles from Universe
- 1. "Universe (Let's Play Ball)" Released: December 10, 2021; 2. "Beautiful" Released: December 14, 2021

Universe is the third studio album and ninth album overall by South Korean boy band NCT. It was released on December 14, 2021, by SM Entertainment. Similar to their previous releases NCT 2018 Empathy and NCT 2020 Resonance, NCT 2021 Universe is part of "NCT 2021" project, which saw all current NCT members from several units collaborating on a full-length release. This time, the album features 21 out of 23 members from three current units of NCT; NCT 127, NCT Dream, and WayV. Members Lucas and Winwin were unable to participate. Universe is NCT's final album to feature Shotaro and Sungchan, who both withdrew from the group in May 2023.

== Background and release ==
On November 13, 2021, it was announced that NCT would reunite for a third time as NCT 2021 following their second full group project, NCT 2020 Resonance, in 2020. Five teaser videos, titled "NCT 2021 YearDream" and each labeled from Stage 0 through Stage 4, were released between November 21 and November 29. NCT groups NCT 127, NCT Dream, and WayV were confirmed to participate in Universe, with Winwin and Lucas being absent from the project. NCT released track videos for "Dreaming", "Miracle", and "Earthquake", by NCT Dream, WayV, and NCT 127, respectively. "Universe (Let's Play Ball)" music video was released on December 10. The music video for "Beautiful" was released alongside the album itself on December 14.

== Commercial performance ==
Universe surpassed more than 1.7 million pre-orders on the day of release, breaking their previous record of 1.1 million pre-orders for NCT 2020 Resonance Pt.1

== Accolades ==
Music program awards for "Universe (Let's Play Ball)"
Program	Date (3 total)	Ref.
Music Bank	December 24, 2021	
Music Bank	December 31, 2021	
Music Bank	January 7, 2022	

Year-end lists
Critic/Publication	List	Work	Rank	Ref.
Los Angeles Times	The 100 best songs of 2021	"OK!"	47	

== Track listing ==
Universe track listing
No.	Title	Lyrics	Music	Arrangement	Length
1.	"New Axis" (NCT U) (sung by Taeyong, Mark and Yangyang)	Taeyong; Mark; Rick Bridges	Jarah Lafayette Gibson (80hdmuzic); G'harah "PK" Degeddingseze (80hdmuzic)	80hdmuzic	2:11
2.	"Universe (Let's Play Ball)" (NCT U) (sung by Doyoung, Jungwoo, Mark, Xiaojun, Jeno, Haechan, Jaemin, Yangyang and Shotaro)	Kenzie; Mark	Kenzie; Dem Jointz; Carlos Battey; Ryan S. Jhun; Breyan Isaac; Wayne Hector; Alexandru Cotoi; Marcel Botezan	Kenzie; Dem Jointz; Breyan Stanley Isaac; Alexandru Cotoi Florin; Marcel Botezan	3:51
3.	"Earthquake" (NCT 127)	Park Seong-hee	Ludwig Evers (Moonshine); Jonatan Gusmark (Moonshine); Deez; Bobii Lewis; Ebenezer Olaoluwa Fabiyi	Moonshine; Deez	3:28
4.	"OK!" (NCT U) (sung by Taeyong, Yuta, Ten, Mark, Hendery, Jeno and Yangyang)	Kenzie	Kenzie; Maurice Moore; Jeremy "Tay" Jasper; Timothy "Bos" Bullock; Hautboi Rich	Timothy "Bos" Bullock	3:49
5.	"Birthday Party" (NCT U) (sung by Johnny, Yuta, Jungwoo, Hendery, Jaemin, Shotaro, Chenle and Jisung)	Rick Bridges	Gamal Kosh Lewis; Jason David Silber; Jeremy "Tay" Jasper; Adrian McKinnon	LunchMoney Lewis; TheOnlyDiet; Julianbeatz; BRIANXWHITE; Jeremy "Tay" Jasper	3:18
6.	"Know Now" (NCT U) (sung by Johnny, Doyoung, Mark, Renjun, Jeno, Jaemin, Yangyang and Sungchan)	Jo Yoon-kyung; Mark	Tia Scola; Marcus Lomax; David Wilson	dwilly	3:48
7.	"Dreaming" (NCT Dream)	Lee Ji-yoon; Rick Bridges	Tim Deal; Sam Klempner; Scott Quinn; Rick Bridges	Sam Klempner	3:10
8.	"Round&Round" (NCT U) (sung by Taeil, Ten, Jaehyun, Xiaojun, Haechan and Sungchan)	Jeon Ji-eun (January 8th (lalala Studio)); Hwang Seon-jeong (January 8th (lalala Studio)); Kim Jeong-mi (January 8th (lalala Studio))	PRNCE (Vendors); M30 (Vendors); Fascinador (Vendors); San (Vendors); Shaquille	Vendors (Joombas)	3:23
9.	"Miracle" (WayV)	Greg Bonnick; Hayden Chapman; Justin Starling; Jeffrey Okyere-Twumasi; Adrian McKinnon	Greg Bonnick; Hayden Chapman; Justin Starling; Jeffrey Okyere-Twumasi; Adrian McKinnon	LDN Noise	3:10
10.	"Vroom" (NCT U) (sung by Kun, Jaehyun, Jungwoo, Hendery, Shotaro, Chenle and Jisung)	Song Yoo (Joombas)	samUIL	samUIL	3:45
11.	"Sweet Dream" (NCT U) (sung by Taeil, Kun, Jaehyun, Haechan and Chenle)	minGtion (ADC Music); Junny	minGtion (ADC Music); Junny	minGtion	3:32
12.	"Good Night" (Korean: 별자리; RR: Byeoljari; lit. 'Constellation') (NCT U) (sung by Taeil, Doyoung, Xiaojun and Renjun)	Jisoo Park (Joombas)	MooF (Joombas); Jisoo Park (Joombas)	Joombas	3:58
13.	"Beautiful" (NCT 2021)	Yoo Young-jin; Taeyong; Mark; Johnny; Jeno; Hendery	Yoo Han-jin; Yoo Young-jin	Yoo Han-jin; Yoo Young-jin	4:21
Total length:					45:49

== Personnel ==
Credits adapted from Naver and QQ Music.

- Rick Bridges – vocal director (track 1, 5), background vocals (track 1, 5)
- GDLO – vocal director (track 2, 5)
- Ju Chan-yang (Pollen) – vocal director (track 3, 10), background vocals (track 3)
- G-high – vocal director (track 6)
- Seo Mi-rae (Butterfly) – vocal director (track 7, 10), pro tools operator (track 7, 10)
- Ju Dae-gwan – vocal director (track 8), pro tools operator (track 8)
- Noday – vocal director (track 8–9), background vocals (track 10)
- minGtion – vocal director (track 11), piano (track 11), bass (track 11), recording (track 11), digital editing (track 11)
- Jisoo Park – vocal director (track 12), background vocals (track 12)
- Yoo Young-jin – vocal director (track 13), background vocals (track 2, 13), digital editing (track 13), engineered for mix (track 13), mixing (track 13)
- NCT – vocals, background vocals
  - Taeil – vocals (track 3, 8, 11, 12–13), background vocals (track 8, 13)
  - Johnny – vocals (track 3, 5–6, 13), background vocals (track 13)
  - Taeyong – vocals (track 1, 3–4, 13), background vocals (track 13)
  - Yuta – vocals (track 3–5, 13), background vocals (track 4, 13)
  - Kun – vocals (track 9–11, 13), background vocals (track 13)
  - Doyoung – vocals (track 2–3, 6, 12–13), background vocals (track 13)
  - Ten – vocals (track 4, 8–9, 13), background vocals (track 2, 4, 13)
  - Jaehyun – vocals (track 3, 8, 10–11, 13), background vocals (track 13)
  - Jungwoo – vocals (track 2–3, 5, 10, 13), background vocals (track 13)
  - Mark – vocals (track 1–4, 6–7, 13), background vocals (track 4, 13), rap making (track 2, 6)
  - Xiaojun – vocals (track 2, 8–9, 12–13), background vocals (track 2, 13)
  - Hendery – vocals (track 4–5, 9–10, 13), background vocals (track 13)
  - Renjun – vocals (track 6–7, 12–13), background vocals (track 13)
  - Jeno – vocals (track 2, 4, 6–7, 13), background vocals (track 4, 13)
  - Haechan – vocals (track 2–3, 7–8, 11, 13), background vocals (track 8, 13)
  - Jaemin – vocals (track 2, 5–7, 13), background vocals (track 13)
  - Yangyang – vocals (track 1–2, 4, 6, 9, 13), background vocals (track 1, 4, 13)
  - Shotaro – vocals (track 2, 5, 10, 13), background vocals (track 13)
  - Sungchan – vocals (track 6, 8, 13), background vocals (track 13)
  - Chenle – vocals (track 5, 7, 10–11, 13), background vocals (track 5, 13)
  - Jisung – vocals (track 5, 7, 10, 13), background vocals (track 5, 13)
- Junny – background vocals (track 2, 7, 11)
- Ebenezer – background vocals (track 3)
- Kenzie – background vocals (track 4)
- Oiaisle – background vocals (track 6)
- MarcLo – background vocals (track 6)
- Dwilly – background vocals (track 6)
- Justin Starling – background vocals (track 9)
- Jeffrey Okyere-Twumasi – background vocals (track 9)
- Adrian McKinnon – background vocals (track 9)
- No Min-ji – recording (track 1–2, 4, 7–8, 12), digital editing(track 1–2, 4–5, 10), engineered for mix (track 10)
- Kang Eun-ji – recording (track 2–3, 5, 10–12), digital editing(track 3, 6), engineered for mix(track 3–4, 6, 12)
- Lee Min-gyu – recording (track 6, 12), mixing (track 6, 8, 10), engineered for mix (track 11)
- Jung Yu-ra – recording (track 7, 9, 12), engineered for mix (track 8), digital editing (track 12)
- Xu Tian Hong – recording (track 8–9)
- On Seong-yun – recording (track 9)
- Jung Ho-jin – digital editing (track 2, 5, 9)
- Kwon Yu-jin – digital editing (track 7–8), recording (track 8, 10–11)
- Lee Ji-hong – engineered for mix (track 5, 9), mixing (track 9, 12)
- Jung Ui-seok – mixing (track 1, 3–4)
- Nam Gung-jin – mixing (track 5, 7)
- Kim Cheol-sun – mixing (track 2, 10)

=== Locations ===
Recording

- SM Yellow Tail Studio
- SM SSAM Studio
- SM Big Shot Studio
- SM Starlight Studio
- doobdoob studio
- Studio21A
- sound POOL Studios
- SM BOOMINGSYSTEM

Editing

- SM Yellow Tail Studio
- SM SSAM Studio
- doobdoob Studio
- sound POOL Studios
- SM Starlight Studio
- SM BOOMINGSYSTEM

Mixing

- SM Blue Cup Studio
- SM Blue Ocean Studio
- SM SSAM Studio
- SM Concert Hall Studio
- SM Big Shot Studio
- SM LVYIN Studio
- SM Starlight Studio
- SM BOOMINGSYSTEM

== Charts ==
=== Weekly charts ===
Weekly chart performance for Universe
Chart (2021–2022)	Peak position
Belgian Albums (Ultratop Flanders)	95
Belgian Albums (Ultratop Wallonia)	177
Croatian International Albums (HDU)	22
Finnish Albums (Suomen virallinen lista)	41
Japanese Albums (Oricon)	1
Japanese Hot Albums (Billboard Japan)	1
South Korean Albums (Gaon)	1
US Billboard 200	20
US Independent Albums (Billboard)	2
US World Albums (Billboard)	1

=== Monthly charts ===
Monthly chart performance for Universe
Chart (2021)	Peak position
Japanese Albums (Oricon)	5
South Korean Albums (Gaon)	1

=== Year-end charts ===
Year-end chart performance for Universe
Chart (2021)	Position
South Korean Albums (Gaon)	5
Chart (2022)	Position
Japanese Albums (Oricon)	45
Japanese Hot Albums (Billboard Japan)	55
South Korean Albums (Circle)	68
US Top Album Sales (Billboard)	56

== Certification and sales ==
Certifications and sales for Universe
Region	Certification	Certified units/sales
South Korea (KMCA)	Million	1,838,636
Japan	—	84,158
