= Glitch Mode =

2022 studio album by NCT Dream

- Digital and Glitch version cover

Studio album by NCT Dream
- Released: March 28, 2022
- Recorded: 2022
- Studio: SM Studio Center (Seoul)
- Genres: R&B; pop; hip-hop; dance
- Language: Korean
- Labels: SM; Dreamus

NCT Dream chronology
Hello Future (2021)	Glitch Mode (2022)	Candy (2022)

NCT chronology
Universe (2021)	Glitch Mode (2022)	2 Baddies (2022)

Singles from Glitch Mode
- 1. "Glitch Mode" Released: March 28, 2022

Beatbox cover
- Digital cover

Singles from Beatbox
- 1. "Beatbox" Released: May 30, 2022

Glitch Mode is the second studio album by South Korean boy band NCT Dream, released on March 28, 2022, by SM Entertainment through Dreamus. Following their previous album Hot Sauce and its repackaged version Hello Future, Glitch Mode is NCT Dream's second record to feature seven members after Mark's return to the lineup and the termination of their age-based graduation system. The repackaged version of the album, Beatbox, features four new tracks, including the lead single of the same name, and was released on May 30.

Glitch Mode is a R&B, pop and hip-hop record containing eleven tracks that evoke a "comforting" atmosphere. It was commercially successful in South Korea, debuting at number one on the monthly Gaon Chart with 1,646,949 copies sold. In the United States, the album became NCT Dream's first entry on the Billboard 200, debuting at number 50.

== Background ==
Glitch Mode came nine months after NCT Dream released their first studio album Hot Sauce, which was met with commercial and critical success, and its reissue Hello Future. In January 2022, SM Entertainment confirmed in a statement to the South-Korean newspaper MyDaily that NCT Dream would release a new album in March. Glitch Mode is NCT Dream's second album to feature a seven-member lineup following Mark's return and the termination of the age-based graduation system.

== Composition and concept ==
Glitch Mode is a R&B, pop and hip-hop record. On it, NCT Dream strays further away from their original "high-teen" concept and bubblegum pop music in favor of a more "mature" image and hip hop sound. While the album opens with more "experimental", "loud" and "animated" tracks, it mainly comprises "fairly lowkey" songs. During the Glitch Mode press conference, Mark stated that through the album and lead single of the same name, they wanted to express how "everyone's abnormal". He revealed that the Korean crime-comedy film Attack the Gas Station heavily inspired the album and music video for the lead single, saying that the concept "popped in my mind after listening to 'Glitch Mode'".

=== Songs ===
The opening track, "Fire Alarm", speaks of NCT Dream's ambition to surprise the world and features an "energetic" chorus, which incorporates a clapping sample and a siren sound refers to the film Attack the Gas Station. The lead single, "Glitch Mode", is a hip-hop dance song featuring a rock guitar interlude that contrasts an introductory narration with a "dynamic" 808 bass and chanting chorus. Its lyrics, with rap verses co-written by Mark, express how someone freezes "as if buffering" when they see someone they like. "Arcade" is a hip-hop dance song with "powerful" beat, whose lyrics follow arcade game motifs and project a message of confidence. A mid-tempo pop song, "It's Yours" is anchored by bass and electric guitar, as well as rap verses written by members Mark, Jeno, Jaemin and Jisung. "Teddy Bear" is an R&B pop ballad focusing on the members' "sweet" voices. "Replay" is a mid-tempo R&B pop song that combines instrumentation ranging from old-school instruments to hi-fi synths and deep bass. Mark, Jeno, and Jisung participated in writing the lyrics, which express longing for happy moments after a breakup. Performed by Mark, Jeno, Jaemin and Jisung, "Saturday Drip" is a '90s hip-hop-inspired track with repeating synths and rap flow that depicts a Saturday night. "Better Than Gold" is a synth-pop song with a funky rhythm and upbeat bass line. Its lyrics express how moments spent together are "more precious than gold". With lyrics intended to comfort those who are struggling and weary, the production of "Drive" centers on acoustic piano and guitars. "Never Goodbye" is an R&B ballad that combines "restrained" percussion with a "gentle" Rhodes keyboard and chimes. It conveys the sentiment of "always waiting in the same place", much like the North Star. Mark, Jeno, Jaemin and Jisung each interpreted the concept differently while writing the lyrics, resulting in different ideas shining throughout the song. The final track of the album, "Rewind", is a "lively" mid-tempo R&B pop song with a light beat. The lyrics reminisce the memories the group members have shared, conveying their desire to stay together forever as "7Dream".

The repackaged version of the album features four additional tracks: "Beatbox", "To My First", "Sorry, Heart" and "On the way". Lead single "Beatbox" is an old-school hip-hop dance song featuring beatboxing samples. "To My First", the fourth installment of NCT Dream's "love series", is a R&B pop song that incorporates electric guitar. Following its predecessors "My First And Last", "Bye My First..." and "Love Again", the song's lyrics contain a final goodbye to a first love after learning what love is through life experiences. Sung by members Renjun, Haechan and Chenle, "Sorry, Heart" features jazz guitar and lyrics about feelings of regret towards the person that one loves. "On the Way" is a R&B pop song with synth keyboards and lyrics that express the members' desire to always be together.

== Release and promotion ==
On February 28, after SM Entertainment confirmed a March release window for NCT Dream, the album title Glitch Mode, written in different "old-school computer-themed" fonts and colors, was revealed in a video teaser. On the same day, SM announced the release date and opened pre-orders. Beginning on March 14, SM released five sets of photo teasers, in which the members were depicted wearing different outfits, from black suits with futuristic bike helmets to hot pink outfits, in various locations, including an abandoned house and a gas station, to convey the "unusual charms" of the lead single "Glitch Mode", whose concept centers around "errors". The images were accompanied by a set of video teasers with a glitch effect featuring individual members. On March 25, NCT Dream teased all eleven tracks with a mashup video uploaded to the group's social media platforms. Glitch Mode was officially released on March 28, alongside a music video for the lead single.

The group held two live broadcasts on YouTube on March 28 and 30 to celebrate the release, where they performed "Glitch Mode" for the first time. From March 31, they performed "Glitch Mode" alongside the b-side "Arcade" on various South Korean music shows, including M Countdown, Music Bank, Inkigayo, Show Champion and Show! Music Core. However, Chenle had to limit his participation in the stages due to an ankle injury. On April 14, they performed the B-side track "Never Goodbye" on M Countdown as a gift to fans. On March 7, SM announced NCT Dream would hold their second online concert, "Dream Stage: Glitch Mode", in support of the album on April 5.

On May 9, SM Entertainment confirmed that the repackaged version of the album, titled Beatbox, would be released on May 30. The repackage version of the album uses packaging certified by the Forest Stewardship Council and was made with environmentally friendly techniques and materials, such as UV coating and soy ink. It consists of two versions, the photobook version and the digipack version, which was created with the help of the members, who contributed in designing the album cover, CD, and booklet. Starting on May 14, teaser images were released through the group's social media platforms. On May 30, Beatbox was released alongside a music video for the lead single of the same name.

The group held two live broadcasts on various social media platforms on May 30 and 31 to talk about the record. To promote the release, the group planned to perform the lead single "Beatbox" on the Japanese television show Venue 101 and on various South Korean music shows, including M Countdown, Music Bank, Inkigayo and Show! Music Core. However, on June 3 it was announced the group would halt all remaining activities since members Jeno and Chenle had tested positive for COVID-19.

=== Pop-up store ===
A pop-up store in Seongsu-dong, Seoul opened from April 1 to May 29 to commemorate the release of Glitch Mode. The arcade-themed store included a photo zone that reproduced the music video's shooting location and an entertainment zone with 8-bit games inspired by the album artwork. Other products and attractions included balloons with the members' signatures and handwritten letters. The store recorded an average of 500 visitors a day and attracted a total of 46,000 people over the course of two months.

== Critical reception ==
Professional ratings
Review scores
Source	Rating
AllMusic	3.5/5 stars
IZM	3/5 stars
NME	4/5 stars

Rhian Daly of NME said that Glitch Mode "feels like a balancing act", where "fairly lowkey" tracks are alternated with NCT Dream's typical experimental songs. She commented positively on the album's more "animated" tracks, while she noted that tracks like "It's Yours" and "Drive" are not memorable. Conversely, Jung Soo-min of IZM wrote that the first half of the album doesn't express the "individuality" of NCT Dream, while she commented positively on the "nostalgic" second half of the album and highlighted songs like "Better Than Gold" and "Drive". Jung thought the album was not on par with Hot Sauce due to "the obsession" with the "neo" concept that has been established for all NCT units, since it doesn't allow NCT Dream to explore more "hopeful" themes, which she believes are the group's strong suit. The album was featured in Time's list "The Best K-pop Songs and Albums of 2022 So Far".

== Commercial performance ==
Glitch Mode surpassed 2.03 million pre-orders on the day of release, the second-highest ever for an act under SM and exceeding NCT Dream's previous career high of 1.71 million pre-orders for Hot Sauce. The album sold 700,000 copies on its first day after release. As of April 3, Glitch Mode recorded sales of 2,100,339 copies within one week, breaking the group's previous personal record of two million copies sold in 16 days for Hot Sauce. On the day of its release, it was announced that Beatbox surpassed 1.4 million pre-orders. On June 13, 2022, it was reported that Beatbox had sold 1.52 million copies. Combining Glitch Mode and Beatbox, the album has sold 3.61 million copies.

Glitch Mode debuted at number 50 on the US Billboard 200 dated April 9, 2022, having sold 15,000 album-equivalent units, becoming NCT Dream's first entry on the chart, as well as number two on the Billboard World Albums chart.

== Accolades ==
Glitch Mode won the Album Bonsang (Note: A bonsang (Korean: 본상), which translates to "main prize", is a major award given at a South Korean award ceremony.) at the 37th Golden Disc Awards. It won Album of the Year at the Genie Music Awards, an award show which selects its winners mainly based on the chart data gathered from the Genie Music platform. NCT Dream also won Singer of the Year at the ceremony, earning two out of the three daesang (Note: A daesang (Korean: 대상), which translates to "grand prize", is the highest honor given out at South Korean music award ceremonies in recognition of the artist(s) with the greatest physical and digital achievements for the year.) that were awarded. The result was contested, since the group won over South Korean trot singer Lim Young-woong, one of the best selling digital artists of the year. The public raised concerns over SM Entertainment's possible involvement, as the company was already caught up in a similar controversy in 2018 and 2019. Writing for Sisa Journal, cultural critic Ha Jae-geun commented that "there's still a long way to go" to restore awards ceremonies' credibility.

Awards and nominations for Glitch Mode
Organization	Year	Category	Result	Ref.
Asian Pop Music Awards	2022	Top 20 Albums of the Year – Overseas	Won	
Asian Pop Music Awards	2022	Best Album of the Year (Overseas)	Nominated	
Circle Chart Music Awards	2023	Album of the Year – 2nd Quarter	Nominated	
Genie Music Awards	2022	Album of the Year	Won	
Golden Disc Awards	2023	Album Bonsang	Won	
MAMA Awards	2022	Album of the Year	Nominated	
Melon Music Awards	2022	Album of the Year	Nominated	

Awards and nominations for Beatbox
Organization	Year	Category	Result	Ref.
Circle Chart Music Awards	2023	Album of the Year – 2nd Quarter	Nominated	

== Track listing ==
Glitch Mode track listing
No.	Title	Lyrics	Music	Arrangement	Length
1.	"Fire Alarm" (파이어 알람)	Lee Seu-ran; Rick Bridges (X&)	Bleu; Brooke Tomlinson; Jesse St. John; Rick Bridges (X&)	Bleu	3:12
2.	"Glitch Mode" (버퍼링; lit. 'Buffering')	Yoo Jae-eun; Mark	Benjamin 55; Alony 55; Sam SZND	Benjamin 55; Alony 55	3:27
3.	"Arcade"	Jung Ha-ri (Joombas)	Alexander Karlsson (JeL); Alexej Viktorovitch (JeL); Dwayne "Dem Jointz" Abernathy Jr.; Harold "Alawn" Philippon	JeL; Dem Jointz	3:27
4.	"It's Yours" (너를 위한 단어; Neoreul wihan daneo; 'Word for You')	Lee Jae-ni (Joombas); Mark; Jeno; Jaemin; Jisung	HighSquad	HighSquad	3:44
5.	"Teddy Bear" (잘 자; Jal ja; 'Good Night')	Im Jung-hyo; Mark	Kwon Deok-geun; Bikkyu; Xiso; Senji	Kwon Deok-geun	4:02
6.	"Replay" (내일 봐; Naeil bwa; 'See You Tomorrow')	Hwang Yu-bin; Mark; Jeno; Jisung	Ludwig Lindell (Caesar & Loui); Gregory G Curtis II	Ludwig Lindell (Caesar & Loui)	3:34
7.	"Saturday Drip" (sung by Mark, Jeno, Jaemin, and Jisung)	Rick Bridges (X&)	samUIL (Decade +); Rick Bridges (X&)	samUIL (Decade +)	3:00
8.	"Better Than Gold" (지금; Jigeum; 'Now')	Jang Yoon-mi; Yoo Eun-mi	Ryan S. Jhun; Kyler Niko; Scott Russell Stoddart	Ryan S. Jhun; Scott Russell Stoddart	3:20
9.	"Drive" (미니카; lit. 'Mini Car')	Jo Yoon-kyung	Noak Hellsing; Robert Habolin; Markus Sepehrmanesh	Robert Habolin	3:18
10.	"Never Goodbye" (북극성; Bukgeukseong; 'North Star')	Hwang Yu-bin; Mark; Jeno; Jaemin; Jisung	Zayson; Kim Ji-hoo	Zayson; Kim Ji-hoo	3:32
11.	"Rewind"	minGtion; Junny	minGtion; Junny	minGtion	3:04
Total length:					37:44

Beatbox bonus tracks
No.	Title	Lyrics	Music	Arrangement	Length
1.	"Beatbox" (비트박스; lit. 'Beatbox')	Jeong Ha-ri (Joombas)	Brice Fox; Emily Kim; Jurek Reunamaki; Michael Jade	Brice Fox; Emily Kim; IMLAY; Jurek Reunamaki; Michael Jade	3:25
5.	"To My First" (마지막 인사; Majimak insa; 'Last Farewell')	Na Do-yeon	Aston Merrygold; Greg Bonnick; Hayden Chapman; Karen Poole	LDN Noise	3:03
8.	"Sorry, Heart" (sung by Renjun, Haechan, Chenle)	Kenzie	Kenzie; Matthew Tishler	Kenzie; Matthew Tishler	3:33
15.	"On the Way" (별 밤; Byeol bam; 'Starry Night')	Fipi; Znee	David Arkwright; Russell Henson; Tom Peyton	David Arkwright; Russell Henson; Tom Peyton	3:29
Total length:					51:14

== Charts ==
=== Weekly charts ===
Weekly chart performance for Glitch Mode and Beatbox
Chart (2022)	Peak position	
Chart (2022)	GM	BB
Belgian Albums (Ultratop Flanders)	64	164
Belgian Albums (Ultratop Wallonia)	162	—
Croatian International Albums (HDU)	29	—
Finnish Albums (Suomen virallinen lista)	18	— (Note: "Beatbox" did not enter Finnish Album Chart, but peaked at position 9 on Finnish Physical Album Chart.)
Hungarian Albums (MAHASZ)	19	—
Japanese Albums (Oricon)	2	—
Japanese Hot Albums (Billboard Japan)	2	2
Polish Albums (ZPAV)	47	31
South Korean Albums (Gaon)	1	1
US Billboard 200	50	—
US Independent Albums (Billboard)	7	—
US World Albums (Billboard)	2	8

=== Monthly charts ===
Monthly chart performance for Glitch Mode and Beatbox
Chart (2022)	Peak position	
Chart (2022)	GM	BB
Japanese Albums (Oricon)	4	—
South Korean Albums (Circle)	1	2

=== Year-end charts ===
Year-end chart performance for Glitch Mode and Beatbox
Chart (2022)	Peak position	
Chart (2022)	GM	BB
Japanese Albums (Oricon)	30	—
Japanese Hot Albums (Billboard Japan)	54	66
South Korean Albums (Circle)	5	11

== Certifications and sales ==
Certifications and sales figures for Glitch Mode
Region	Certification	Certified units/sales
Japan Glitch Mode	—	135,720
South Korea (KMCA) Glitch Mode	2× Million	2,108,183
South Korea (KMCA) Beatbox	Million	1,526,927
United States Glitch Mode	—	15,000

== Release history ==
Release history and formats for Glitch Mode
Region	Date	Format	Version	Label	Ref.
Various	March 28, 2022	Digital download; streaming; CD	Glitch Mode	SM; Dreamus	
Various	May 30, 2022	Digital download; streaming; CD	Beatbox	SM; Dreamus	

== See also ==
- List of best-selling albums in South Korea
- List of Gaon Album Chart number ones of 2022
