= Beatbox (NCT Dream song) =

2022 single by NCT Dream

- English version cover

Single by NCT Dream

from the album Beatbox
- Language: Korean
- Released: May 30, 2022
- Studio: SM Yellow Tail Studio; SM Blue Cup Studio
- Genre: Hip hop; R&B; teen pop
- Length: 3:25
- Label: SM; Dreamus
- Composers: Brice Fox; Emily Kim; Jurek Reunamaki; Michael Jade
- Lyricist: Jeong Ha-ri

NCT Dream singles chronology
"Glitch Mode" (2022)	"Beatbox" (2022)	"Candy" (2022)

NCT singles chronology
"Glitch Mode" (2022)	"Beatbox" (2022)	"2 Baddies" (2022)

Music video
- "Beatbox" on YouTube

"Beatbox" is a song that was recorded by South Korean boy group NCT Dream. It was released as the lead single from the repackaged version of their second studio album Glitch Mode (2022) on May 30, 2022, alongside an accompanying music video. The song was written by Jeong Ha-ri and was composed by Brice Fox, Emily Kim, Jurek Reunamaki, and Michael Jade, who worked on the arrangement with Imlay. It is a hip hop, R&B and teen pop song with lyrics influenced by the themes of old-school hip hop.

In South Korea, "Beatbox" topped the Gaon Digital Chart. NCT Dream was set to perform the song on several South Korean television shows, but had to cancel due to two members testing positive for COVID-19. The song still won five music programs awards. Critics commented positively on "Beatbox"'s concept and its originality, despite being heavily influenced by the 90s' aesthetic and musical themes.

== Background and release ==
In January 2022, SM Entertainment confirmed that NCT Dream would release their second studio album in March. Following several sets of teasers, Glitch Mode was released on March 28. On May 9, SM Entertainment confirmed that the repackaged version of Glitch Mode, titled Beatbox, would be released on May 30. It would feature four new tracks, including "Beatbox", which would serve as the lead single. Starting on May 14, teaser images were released through the group's social media platforms. On May 30, the song was released with an accompanying music video. The English version of the song was released on March 21, 2023.

== Composition ==
"Beatbox" was written by Jeong Ha-ri and was composed by Brice Fox, Emily Kim, Jurek Reunamaki, and Michael Jade, who worked on the arrangement with Imlay. It is a hip hop, R&B and teen pop song featuring beatboxing samples with lyrics inspired by the themes typical of old-school and 90s hip hop. The song was composed in the key of E minor with a tempo of 94 beats per minute.

== Commercial performance ==
In South Korea, "Beatbox" debuted at number one on the Gaon Digital Chart for the issue dated May 29–June 4, 2022. "Beatbox" reached number 12 on the Billboard South Korea Songs. In Japan, the song peaked at number 55 on the Billboard Japan Hot 100 chart for the issue dated June 11, 2022. In Singapore, it peaked at number 17 on the RIAS Top Regional chart. In the United States, "Beatbox" peaked at number 9 on the US World Digital Song Sales chart. The song debuted at number 147 on the Billboard Global Excl. US for the issue dated June 11, 2022.

== Promotion ==
NCT Dream planned to perform "Beatbox" on the Japanese television show Venue 101 and on various radio show and South Korean music programs, including M Countdown, Music Bank, Inkigayo and Show! Music Core. However, on June 3 it was announced the group would halt all remaining activities since members Jeno and Chenle had tested positive for COVID-19. On June 18, 2022, they performed the song at the 28th Dream Concert, alongside some of their previous singles, including "Glitch Mode".

== Critical reception ==
Multiple critics commented positively on "Beatbox" and its place in NCT Dream's discography, saying that it embodies the group's "youthful" concept. Choi Ha-na of TV Daily expressed her approval of the group's "two-track strategy", that is NCT Dream's habit to release an "experimental" song, sonically similar to the other NCT units, followed by a song conceptually closer to their original sound, which allows them to try new things while keeping the public's attention on them. Jeong Ha-eun of Sports Seoul also noted how the "hopeful, bright and energetic energy" expressed through some of NCT Dream's songs differs from the other units, thus helping them appeal to a different type of public. Lee Min-ji of Newsen pointed out how NCT Dream first introduced old-school hip-hop songs like "Beatbox" in their discography in 2018 with their single "We Go Up" and praised this choice, as it fits them well. A music critic writing for Weekly Donga said that, while K-pop acts often use the 90s' aesthetic and musical themes, NCT Dream managed to be original by creating a song with a modern R&B and teen pop sound that includes popular elements such as a whispered hook, while keeping the lyrical themes of the period.

== Accolades ==
Music program awards
Program	Date	Ref.
Inkigayo	June 12, 2022	
M Countdown	June 9, 2022	
Music Bank	June 10, 2022	
Show Champion	June 8, 2022	
Show! Music Core	June 11, 2022	

== Charts ==
=== Weekly charts ===
Weekly chart performance for "Beatbox"
Chart (2022)	Peak position
Indonesia (Billboard)	8
Japan (Japan Hot 100)	55
Singapore Top Regional (RIAS)	17
South Korea (Billboard)	12
South Korea (Circle)	1
US World Digital Song Sales (Billboard)	9
Vietnam (Vietnam Hot 100)	72

=== Monthly charts ===
Monthly chart performance for "Beatbox"
Chart (2022)	Position
South Korea (Circle)	19

=== Year-end charts ===
Year-end chart performance for "Beatbox"
Chart (2022)	Position
South Korea (Circle)	176

== Release history ==
Release history for "Beatbox"
Region	Date	Format	Version	Label
Various	May 30, 2022	Digital download; streaming	Original (Korean)	SM; Dreamus
Various	March 21, 2023	Digital download; streaming	English	SM; Dreamus

== Credits and personnel ==
Credits adapted from album's liner notes.

=== Studio ===
- SM Yellow Tail Studio – recording
- SM Blue Cup Studio – recording, mixing
- doobdoob Studio – digital editing
- 821 Sound Mastering – mastering

=== Personnel ===
- SM Entertainment – executive producer
- Lee Sung-soo – production director, executive supervisor
- Tak Young-jun – executive supervisor
- Yoo Young-jin – music and sound supervisor
- NCT Dream – vocals
  - Renjun – background vocals
  - Haechan – background vocals
  - Chenle – background vocals
- XYDO – background vocals
- Jeong Ha-ri – Korean lyrics
- Brice Fox – English lyrics, composition, arrangement, background vocals
- Emily Kim – English lyrics, composition, arrangement
- Jurek Reunamaki – composition, arrangement
- Michael Jade – English lyrics, composition, arrangement, background vocals
- Imlay – arrangement
- Kenzie – vocal directing
- Noh Min-ji – recording
- Jung Eui-seok – recording, mixing
- Eugene Kwon – digital editing
- Kwon Nam-woo – mastering

== See also ==
- List of Gaon Digital Chart number ones of 2022
