= Glitch Mode (song) =

2022 single by NCT Dream

- Jinbo remix cover

Single by NCT Dream

from the album Glitch Mode
- Language: Korean
- Released: March 28, 2022
- Studio: SM Yellow Tail Studio (Seoul)
- Genre: Hip hop
- Length: 3:27
- Label: SM; Dreamus
- Composers: Benjamin 55; Alony 55; Sam SZND
- Lyricists: Yoo Jae-eun; Mark

NCT Dream singles chronology
"Hello Future" (2021)	"Glitch Mode" (2022)	"Beatbox" (2022)

NCT singles chronology
"Beautiful" (2021)	"Glitch Mode" (2022)	"Beatbox" (2022)

Music video
- "Glitch Mode" on YouTube

"Glitch Mode" (Korean: 버퍼링; RR: Beopeoring; lit. 'Buffering') is a song that was recorded by South Korean boy group NCT Dream. It was released as the lead single from their second studio album Glitch Mode (2022) on March 28, 2022, alongside an accompanying music video. The song was written by NCT Dream's member Mark and Yoo Jae-eun and was composed by Sam SZND alongside Benjamin 55 and Alony 55, who also worked on the arrangement.

== Background and release ==
In January 2022, SM Entertainment confirmed that NCT Dream would release a new album in March. Beginning on March 14, SM released different sets of photo teasers, in which the members were depicted wearing different outfits conveying the "unusual charms" of the song, whose concept centers around "errors". On March 25, NCT Dream teased all the tracks, including "Glitch Mode", with a mashup video. The song was released on March 28 alongside an accompanying music video.

== Composition ==
"Glitch Mode" was written by NCT Dream's member Mark and Yoo Jae-eun and was composed by Sam SZND alongside Benjamin 55 and Alony 55, who also worked on the arrangement. It is a hip hop dance song featuring a rock guitar interlude that contrasts an introductory narration with a "dynamic" 808 bass and chanting chorus. The song's lyrics express how someone freezes "as if buffering" when they see someone they like. The accompanying choreography includes a "buffering" move that embodies the song's theme.

== Commercial performance ==
In South Korea, "Glitch Mode" debuted at number two on the Gaon Digital Chart for the issue dated March 27–April 2, 2022. The song peaked at number 52 on the Billboard's K-pop Hot 100 chart for the issue dated April 16, 2022. In Japan, "Glitch Mode" debuted at number 35 on the Billboard Japan Hot 100 chart for the issue dated April 9, 2022, becoming NCT Dream's highest ranking song on the chart to date. In the United States, "Glitch Mode" debuted at number 126 on the Billboard Global Excl. US for the issue dated April 9, 2022.

== Promotion ==
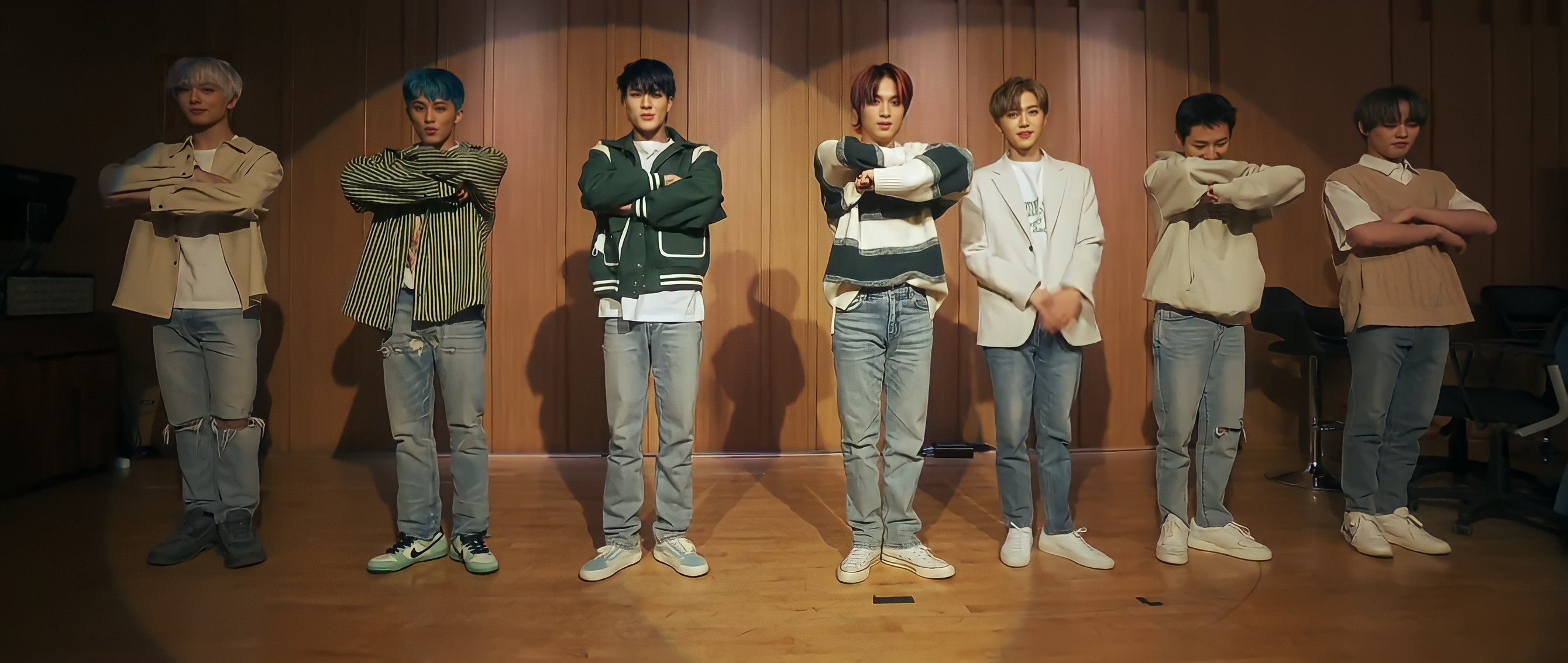
NCT Dream performing "Glitch Mode" on SBS Radio, April 2022

NCT Dream performed "Glitch Mode" for the first time on two live broadcasts held on March 28 and 30. They went on to perform the song on various South Korean music shows, including M Countdown, Music Bank, Inkigayo, Show Champion and Show! Music Core. "Glitch Mode" was also part of the tracklist of the group's second online concert, "Dream Stage: Glitch Mode", held on April 5. NCT Dream performed the song at Europe's first K-pop Festival, which was held in Germany on May 14 and 15, alongside their previous singles, "Hot Sauce", "Ridin'" and "Hello Future".

== Jinbo remix version ==
On June 18, 2022, it was announced that a remix version of "Glitch Mode" would be released as a single titled, iScreaM Vol.16 : 버퍼링 (Glitch Mode) Remix. It was stated that DJ and producer Jinbo would be the one working on the remix of the song. Additionally, it would be reinterpreted using Jinbo's vocals, narration, and rhythm changes. On June 20, a 39-second music video teaser for the remix version was uploaded on the official SM Town channel. The single was released on June 21 along with the music video.

== Accolades ==
"Glitch Mode" won five first place music program awards on Show Champion (April 6), M Countdown (April 7), Music Bank (April 8), Show! Music Core (April 9), and Inkigayo (April 10). It received a nomination for Best Dance Performance – Male Group at the 2022 MAMA Awards.

== Credits and personnel ==
Credits adapted from the album's liner notes.

=== Studio ===
- SM Yellow Tail Studio – recording, digital editing
- doobdoob Studio – digital editing
- SM Blue Cup Studio – mixing
- 821 Sound – mastering

=== Personnel ===
- SM Entertainment – executive producer
- Lee Soo-man – producer
- Lee Sung-soo – production director, executive supervisor
- Tak Young-jun – executive supervisor
- Yoo Young-jin – music and sound supervisor
- NCT Dream – vocals
  - Mark – lyrics, background vocals
  - Renjun – background vocals
  - Haechan – background vocals
  - Chenle – background vocals
- Yoo Jae-eun – lyrics
- Benjamin 55 – composition, arrangement
- Alony 55 – composition, arrangement
- Sam SZND – composition
- GDLO – vocal directing
- Noh Min-ji – recording, digital editing
- Eugene Kwon – digital editing
- Jung Eui-seok – mixing
- Kwon Nam-woo – mastering

== Charts ==
=== Weekly charts ===
Weekly chart performance for "Glitch Mode"
Chart (2022)	Peak position
Global Excl. U.S. (Billboard)	126
Indonesia (Billboard)	15
Japan Combined Singles (Oricon)	23
Japan (Japan Hot 100)	35
Singapore Top Regional (RIAS)	25
South Korea (Gaon)	2
South Korea (K-pop Hot 100)	52
Vietnam (Vietnam Hot 100)	69

=== Monthly charts ===
Monthly chart performance for "Glitch Mode"
Chart (2022)	Position
South Korea (Gaon)	22

=== Year-end charts ===
Year-end chart performance for "Glitch Mode"
Chart (2022)	Position
South Korea (Circle)	141

== Release history ==
Release history for "Glitch Mode"
Region	Date	Format	Label
Various	March 28, 2022	Digital download; streaming	SM; Dreamus
