= Beautiful (NCT song) =

2021 song by NCT U

Single by NCT 2021

from the album Universe
- Released: December 14, 2021
- Recorded: 2021
- Studio: SM Booming System, Seoul, South Korea
- Genre: K-pop; R&B; ballad
- Length: 4:21
- Label: SM; Dreamus
- Composers: Yoo Han-jin; Yoo Young-jin
- Lyricists: Johnny; Taeyong; Mark; Hendery; Jeno; Yoo Young-jin
- Producers: Yoo Han-jin; Yoo Young-jin

NCT Project singles chronology
"Resonance" (2020)	"Beautiful" (2021)	"Golden Age" (2023)

NCT singles chronology
"Universe (Let's Play Ball)" (2021)	"Beautiful" (2021)	"Glitch Mode" (2022)

Music video
- "Beautiful" on YouTube

"Beautiful" is a song recorded by South Korean boy group NCT 2021, the project of NCT under the management of SM Entertainment. The song was served as the second single of NCT's third studio album Universe, and it was released on December 14, 2021, same day of the release of the album.

== Composition and lyrics ==
"Beautiful" was composed and arranged by brothers Yoo Han-jin and Yoo Young-jin, who also took part in writing the song lyrics. Member Johnny wrote the intro lyrics of the song, while Taeyong, Mark, Hendery and Jeno took each of their own rap lyrics. It was recorded at SM Entertainment's recording studio, SM Booming System, and was produced by Yoo Young-jin, group's long-time frequent collaborator. The song was composed in the key of C# major, with a tempo of 128 beats per minute.

Described as a pop ballad R&B song features some "electronic synths, pop strings, drums and piano", the lyrics talks about "expresses positive energy with a warm message to those having a hard time that they are all special in their own ways". Throughout the song, NCT wants listeners to "stop comparing themselves to others because they’re beautiful just the way they are".

== Music video ==
The music video, which was directed by Kim Ki-hyun and Kim Hyun-soo, was released alongside the song by SM Entertainment on December 14. It "follows members of the boyband going through a day in their life, before gathering at the end to perform the track while it snows". The filming locations for the music video are the Noryangjin Baseball Stadium in Noryangjin-dong, Dongjak-gu, Seoul; Incheon International Ferry Terminal and Songdo International Business District in Incheon; Icheon Hyundai Apartment in Yongsan-gu, Seoul; Royal X in Gyeonggi; and Beijing, China.

== Promotion ==
To promote the song, NCT performed it at the SM Town Live 2022: SMCU Express at Kwangya, with other songs from their sub-unit.

== Credits ==
Credits adapted from album's liner notes.

Studio

- SM Booming System – recording, digital editing, engineered for mix, mixing
- Sonic Korea – mastering

Personnel

- SM Entertainment – executive producer
- Lee Soo-man – producer
- Lee Sung-soo – production director, executive supervisor
- Tak Young-jun – executive supervisor
- NCT 2021 – vocals, background vocals
  - Johnny – lyrics
  - Taeyong – lyrics
  - Mark – lyrics
  - Hendery – lyrics
  - Jeno – lyrics
- Yoo Young-jin – producer, lyrics, composition, arrangement, vocal directing, background vocals, recording, digital editing, engineered for mix, mixing, music and sound supervisor
- Yoo Han-jin – producer, composition, arrangement
- Jeon Hoon – mastering
- Shin Soo-min – mastering assistant

== Release history ==
Release dates and formats for Beautiful
Region	Date	Format	Label(s)
Various	December 14, 2021	Digital download; streaming	SM Entertainment
South Korea	December 14, 2021	CD (for the album Universe)	SM Entertainment
