= Universe (Let's Play Ball) =

2021 song by NCT U

Single by NCT U

from the album Universe
- Released: December 10, 2021
- Recorded: 2021
- Studio: SM Yellow Tail Studio; SM SSAM Studio
- Genre: K-pop; hip-hop; EDM
- Length: 3:51
- Label: SM; Dreamus
- Composers: Carlos Battey; Wayne Hector; Breyan Isaac; Alexandru Cotoi; Marcel Botezan; Dem Jointz; Ryan S. Jhun; Kenzie
- Lyricists: Mark; Kenzie
- Producers: Dem Jointz; Kenzie

NCT U singles chronology
"Work It" (2020)	"Universe (Let's Play Ball)" (2021)	"Baggy Jeans" (2023)

NCT singles chronology
"Favorite (Vampire)" (2021)	"Universe (Let's Play Ball)" (2021)	"Beautiful" (2021)

Music video
- "Universe (Let's Play Ball)" on YouTube

"Universe (Let's Play Ball)" is a song recorded by South Korean boy group NCT U, the first unit of NCT under the management of SM Entertainment. The song was served as the lead single of NCT's third studio album Universe, and it was released on December 10, 2021, four days prior to the release of the album.

== Composition and lyrics ==
"Universe (Let's Play Ball)" was composed by Carlos Battey, Wayne Hector, Breyan Isaac, Alexandru Cotoi, Marcel Botezan, Dem Jointz, Ryan S. Jhun and Kenzie, with the arrangement held by Issac, Cotoi, Botezan, Jointz and Kenzie. It was recorded at two SM Entertainment's recording studios, SM Yellow Tail Studio and SM SSAM Studio, and was produced by Dem Jointz and Kenzie, SM's long-time frequent collaborators. The song was composed in the key of F minor, with a tempo of 180 beats per minute.

Described as an EDM hip-hop song with catchy hook, clattering percussion, the lyrics were written by Kenzie and NCT U's member Mark.

== Music video ==
The music video, which was directed by Hong Jae-hwan and Beomjin, was released alongside the song by SM Entertainment on December 10. It features scenes of NCT U's members "challenging each other to a game of baseball, alongside shots of the group performing choreography".

== Accolades ==
Music program awards for "Universe (Let's Play Ball)"
Program	Date (3 total)	Ref.
Music Bank	December 24, 2021	
Music Bank	December 31, 2022	
Music Bank	January 7, 2022	

== Credits ==
Credits adapted from album's liner notes.

Studio

- SM Yellow Tail Studio – recording, digital editing
- SM SSAM Studio – recording
- Sound Pool Studio – digital editing
- SM Blue Ocean Studio – mixing
- 821 Sound – mastering

Personnel

- SM Entertainment – executive producer
- Lee Soo-man – producer
- Lee Sung-soo – production director, executive supervisor
- Tak Young-jun – executive supervisor
- NCT U – vocals
  - Mark – lyrics
- Kenzie – producer, lyrics, composition, arrangement
- Dem Jointz – producer, composition, arrangement
- Breyan Isaac – composition, arrangement
- Alexandru Cotoi – composition, arrangement
- Marcel Botezan – composition, arrangement
- Carlos Battey – composition
- Wayne Hector – composition
- Ryan S. Jhun – composition
- Junny – background vocals
- Yoo Young-jin – background vocals, music and sound supervisor
- GDLO – vocal directing
- Noh Min-ji – recording, digital editing
- Kang Eun-ji – recording
- Jung Ho-jin – digital editing
- Kim Cheol-sun – mixing
- Kwon Nam-woo – mastering

== Charts ==
Chart (2021)	Peak position
Global Excl. US (Billboard)	146
Japan Hot 100 (Billboard)	61
South Korea (Gaon)	86
South Korea (K-Pop Hot 100)	96
US World Digital Song Sales (Billboard)	14

== Release history ==
Release dates and formats for Universe (Let's Play Ball)
Region	Date	Format	Label(s)
Various	December 10, 2021	Digital download; streaming	SM Entertainment
South Korea	December 10, 2021	CD	SM Entertainment
