= List of Circle Digital Chart number ones of 2022 =

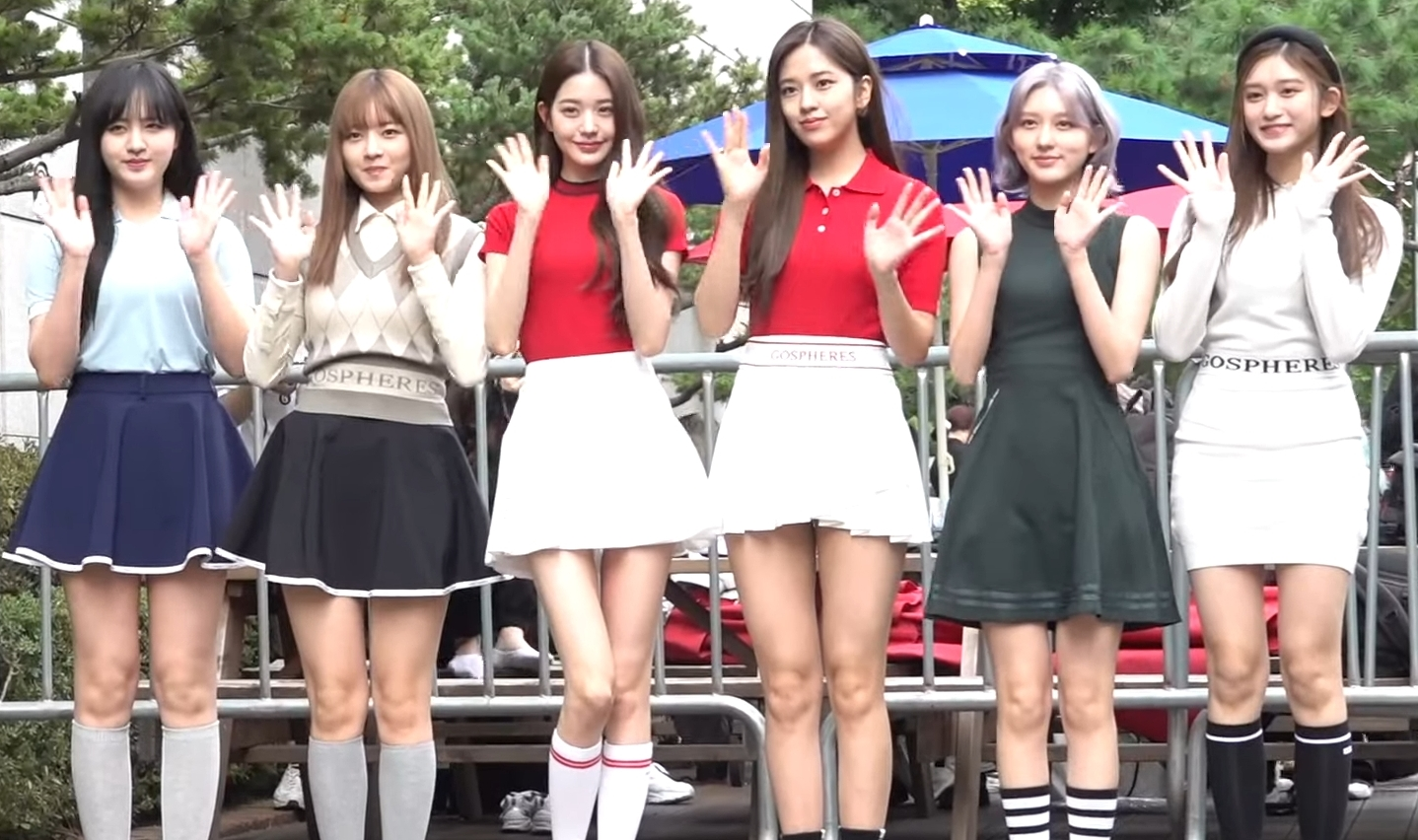
Ive's "Love Dive" topped the chart for four consecutive weeks and was the best-performing song of the year. Their song "After Like" also topped the chart for four consecutive weeks.

The Circle Digital Chart, known as the Gaon Digital Chart until its July 2022 rebranding, is a chart that ranks the best-performing singles in South Korea. Managed by the domestic Ministry of Culture, Sports and Tourism (MCST), its data is compiled by the Korea Music Content Industry Association and published by the Circle Chart. The ranking is based collectively on each single's download sales, stream count, and background music use. The Circle Chart provides weekly (listed from Sunday to Saturday), monthly, and yearly lists for the chart.

Following the announcement of the data for week 27 and the monthly chart of June, the Gaon Digital Chart was rebranded to the Circle Digital Chart, in line with Gaon's rebranding to Circle.

== Weekly charts ==
Key
†	Indicates best-performing single of 2022

Week ending date	Song	Artist(s)	Ref.
January 1	"Merry-Go-Round" (회전목마)	Sokodomo featuring Zion.T and Wonstein	
January 8	"Winter Sleep" (겨울잠)	IU	
January 15	"Drunken Confession" (취중고백)	Kim Min-seok	
January 22	"Drunken Confession" (취중고백)	Kim Min-seok	
January 29	"Drunken Confession" (취중고백)	Kim Min-seok	
February 5	"Drunken Confession" (취중고백)	Kim Min-seok	
February 12	"Drunken Confession" (취중고백)	Kim Min-seok	
February 19	"INVU"	Taeyeon	
February 26	"INVU"	Taeyeon	
March 5	"INVU"	Taeyeon	
March 12	"INVU"	Taeyeon	
March 19	"Ganadara"	Jay Park featuring IU	
March 26	"Tomboy"	(G)I-dle	
April 2	"Tomboy"	(G)I-dle	
April 9	"Still Life" (봄여름가을겨울)	Big Bang	
April 16	"Still Life" (봄여름가을겨울)	Big Bang	
April 23	"Our Blues, Our Life" (우리들의 블루스)	Lim Young-woong	
April 30	"Still Life" (봄여름가을겨울)	BigBang	
May 7	"If We Ever Meet Again" (다시 만날 수 있을까)	Lim Young-woong	
May 14	"That That"	Psy featuring Suga	
May 21	"That That"	Psy featuring Suga	
May 28	"That That"	Psy featuring Suga	
June 4	"Beatbox"	NCT Dream	
June 11	"That That"	Psy featuring Suga	
June 18	"Love Dive" †	Ive	
June 25	"Love Dive" †	Ive	
July 2	"Love Dive" †	Ive	
July 9	"Love Dive" †	Ive	
July 16	"At That Moment" (그때 그 순간 그대로 (그그그))	WSG Wannabe (Gaya-G)	
July 23	"At That Moment" (그때 그 순간 그대로 (그그그))	WSG Wannabe (Gaya-G)	
July 30	"At That Moment" (그때 그 순간 그대로 (그그그))	WSG Wannabe (Gaya-G)	
August 6	"At That Moment" (그때 그 순간 그대로 (그그그))	WSG Wannabe (Gaya-G)	
August 13	"At That Moment" (그때 그 순간 그대로 (그그그))	WSG Wannabe (Gaya-G)	
August 20	"Attention"	NewJeans	
August 27	"Attention"	NewJeans	
September 3	"After Like"	Ive	
September 10	"After Like"	Ive	
September 17	"After Like"	Ive	
September 24	"After Like"	Ive	
October 1	"New Thing" (새삥)	Zico featuring Homies	
October 8	"New Thing" (새삥)	Zico featuring Homies	
October 15	"New Thing" (새삥)	Zico featuring Homies	
October 22	"New Thing" (새삥)	Zico featuring Homies	
October 29	"Nxde"	(G)I-dle	
November 5	"Nxde"	(G)I-dle	
November 12	"Event Horizon" (사건의 지평선)	Younha	
November 19	"Event Horizon" (사건의 지평선)	Younha	
November 26	"Event Horizon" (사건의 지평선)	Younha	
December 3	"Event Horizon" (사건의 지평선)	Younha	
December 10	"Event Horizon" (사건의 지평선)	Younha	
December 17	"Event Horizon" (사건의 지평선)	Younha	
December 24	"Ditto"	NewJeans	
December 31	"Ditto"	NewJeans	

== Monthly charts ==
Month	Song	Artist(s)	Ref.
January	"Drunken Confession" (취중고백)	Kim Min-seok	
February	"Drunken Confession" (취중고백)	Kim Min-seok	
March	"INVU"	Taeyeon	
April	"Still Life" (봄여름가을겨울)	BigBang	
May	"That That"	Psy featuring Suga	
June	"Love Dive" †	Ive	
July	"At That Moment" (그때 그 순간 그대로 (그그그))	WSG Wannabe (Gaya-G)	
August	"Attention"	NewJeans	
September	"After Like"	Ive	
October	"New Thing" (새삥)	Zico featuring Homies	
November	"Event Horizon" (사건의 지평선)	Younha	
December	"Event Horizon" (사건의 지평선)	Younha	
