= SM Rookies =

South Korean pre-debut training team

SMROOKIES
- Final logo, used from July 2022 to 2024

Background information
- Origin: Seoul, South Korea
- Genres: K-pop; Mandopop
- Years active: 2013–2024
- Label: SM
- Past members: See debuted members and former members

SM Rookies (Korean: 에스엠루키즈, stylized in all caps as SMROOKIES) was a pre-debut training team created by South Korean entertainment agency SM Entertainment in 2013, composed of trainees who have yet to join an idol group. From 2013 to 2023, the team officially introduced 35 members, of which 30 debuted under SM Entertainment as part of Red Velvet, NCT, Aespa, Riize, and Mytro, with rookie Lami debuting as an actress. Since 2024, the team has had no active members.

== History ==
=== 2013–2017: Formation and debuts of Red Velvet and NCT ===
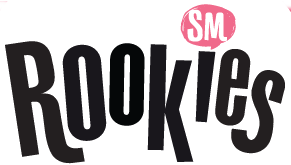
Logo used from 2013 to 2018

SM Entertainment formally announced the creation of SM Rookies on December 3, 2013, featuring members Seulgi, Jeno and Taeyong. On December 9, Irene, Jaehyun and Lami were introduced. On December 16, members Mark, Hansol, and Jisung were introduced, followed by Johnny, Ten and Yuta on December 23.

In January 2014, SM Rookies opened their official Twitter account. Wendy was introduced on March 13, 2014, with the song "Because Of You", recorded for the soundtrack of the SM C&C-produced series Mimi. On March 19, 2014, a video of Wendy singing "Speak Now" by Taylor Swift was released. In April, SM Entertainment launched the official website of the SM Rookies project, which they announced with a video teaser uploaded onto their official YouTube channel, featuring Irene, Seulgi, Wendy, Taeyong, Jaehyun, and Mark. Seulgi later featured on labelmate Henry's song "Butterfly". On July 17, a performance video of Irene and Seulgi dancing to the song "Be Natural" by S.E.S. was released, credited to SR14G. Member Donghyuck was later introduced on July 17, 2014. On July 21, Taeyong released a track video for the song "Open The Door". On July 22, Mark and Donghyuck were featured in the first video of the Rookie Station project. Later that month, the agency confirmed Irene, Seulgi, and Wendy as members of the group Red Velvet. On August 14, SM Rookies member Yeri was featured in the third video of Rookie Station alongside Taeyong, Yuta, Jaehyun, Mark, Jeno and Donghyuck. On August 21, the fourth video of the Rookies Station series was released. On August 24, a video of Johnny, Taeyong and Hansol dancing to the song "Super Moon" was released, credited to SR14B. On September 16, the sixth video of the Rookie Station was released, featuring members Johnny, Yuta, Ten, and Jaehyun. On October 9, Taeyong was featured in Red Velvet's single "Be Natural".

On January 16, 2015, member Doyoung was introduced as he and Jaehyun were to become the new MCs of MBC Music's Show Champion. On February 19, 2015, Johnny, Yuta, Ten, and Lami released their Lunar New Year greetings. In February, a report of Red Velvet filming a music video with trainee Yeri leaked online. The following month, SM Entertainment formally introduced Yeri as the fifth member of Red Velvet. On March 6, a clip of Hansol, Johnny, Taeyong, Yuta, Ten, and Jaehyun (as SR15B) dancing to the song "Bassbot" was released. After months of being featured in various SM Rookies events, Jaemin was formally introduced in April. In June, Ten and Jaehyun competed in the Hope Basketball All-Star event. Later that month, SM Rookies were featured in News 'Korean Pop Idols Rule Asia' featuring Mark giving a short talk. On July 9, 2015, members Koeun, Hina, and Herin were introduced as they were to become "Mouseketeers" on Disney Channel Korea's The Mickey Mouse Club alongside Mark, Jeno, Donghyuck, Jaemin, Jisung, and Lami. On July 26, SM Entertainment announced a concert for the team's male members, titled SM Rookies Show. On July 30, a video of Hansol, Johnny, Taeyong, Yuta, Ten, and Jaehyun (as SR15B) performing a dance routine was released. On October 13, 2015, Taeil was introduced after being featured in multiple SM Rookies events. In November, female members of SM Rookies performed a dance performance in the video "Rookies Entertainment App Launching". On December 18, Kun was formally introduced. On December 22, Lami, Hina, and fellow trainee Park Jungyeon appeared in video teasers for Winter Garden 2015.

On January 5, 2016, WinWin was introduced. On January 26, Taeil released the song "Because Of You" for the soundtrack of the series The Merchant: Gaekju 2015. SM Entertainment founder Lee Soo-man announced a concept for a new boy band, to be called NCT, in which different teams would debut based in different countries around the world. In April 2016, the agency announced Taeil, Taeyong, Doyoung, Ten, Jaehyun and Mark as members of NCT's first sub-unit, NCT U. In July, the agency also confirmed Yuta, WinWin and Donghyuck (now known by his stage name Haechan) as members of NCT's second sub-unit, NCT 127. In August, the agency confirmed Jeno, Jaemin and Jisung as members of NCT's third sub-unit, NCT Dream, alongside Mark and Haechan. On September 19, Yiyang and Ningning were introduced followed by their appearances on the online reality show My SMT. In December, the agency confirmed Johnny as a new member of NCT 127.

On April 5, 2017, Lucas was introduced, followed by Jungwoo on April 17. Jungwoo and Koeun made appearances in the music video of Super Junior member Yesung's single "Paper Umbrella" later that month. After an almost one-year absence, member Kun appeared with Lucas and Jungwoo for the opening of SM Rookies' Instagram account. In late June, Herin was confirmed as a contestant of Mnet's survival show Idol School, leading to her departure from the team and SM Entertainment. Hansol followed in October, participating as a contestant in the KBS survival show The Unit.

=== 2018: New NCT members and debut of WayV ===
In January 2018, NCT unveiled a "large scale project" called NCT 2018, and some members of SM Rookies were seen in Ukraine filming a music video for a possible comeback. Members Jungwoo and Lucas were spotted alongside other NCT members in the airport en route to Ukraine. On January 30, SM Entertainment confirmed the debut of remaining SM Rookies members Kun, Lucas, and Jungwoo through the video "NCT 2018 Yearbook #1". On February 14, NCT U released the single "Boss", recorded by Lucas and Jungwoo alongside members Taeyong, Doyoung, Jaehyun, Winwin, and Mark.

On July 17, three male Chinese trainees, Hendery, Xiaojun, and Yangyang, were introduced. On October 1, Yiyang confirmed she had left SM Entertainment and returned to China to join the idol competition show The Next Top Bang. On December 31, SM Entertainment announced the debut of Hendery, Xiaojun and Yangyang as members of NCT's Chinese sub-unit, WayV.

=== 2020: Formation of Aespa ===
On October 26, SM Entertainment announced the formation of their new girl group, Aespa. On October 29, Ningning was introduced as the third member of the group, which debuted on November 17.

=== 2022–2025: Lami's debut, Formation of Riize and NCT Wish ===
On July 1, 2022, SM Entertainment introduced three new male trainees: Eunseok, Shohei, and Seunghan. In November 2022, it was announced they would star in the reality show Welcome to NCT Universe.

On December 9, 2022, SM Entertainment confirmed that Lami would debut as an actress, making her return to the agency after leaving in 2020. She would be the last member of the original SM Rookies lineup, introduced in 2013, to debut. In May 2023, she appeared on the ENA television series Oh! Youngsim.

In 2023, Hina signed with Japanese modelling agency Trapeziste, hence it is assumed that she has departed from SM.

On May 24, 2023, SM announced that Eunseok and Seunghan would no longer debut in NCT's new unit and instead debut as members of the company's upcoming boy band. Shohei was not added to the lineup due to personal health reasons, with the company planning to support his individual activities in the future. On May 31, 2023, Eunseok and Seunghan announced they had graduated from the team through handwritten letters posted on the SM Rookies's Instagram. On July 31, 2023, SM confirmed the name of the boy band, Riize, which debuted on September 4.

On June 28, 2023, SM Entertainment released a teaser video introducing two new male trainees, Yushi and Sion. It was later confirmed that they would debut with NCT's new six-member sub-unit and would appear on the reality show NCT Universe: Lastart, dedicated to selecting the remaining four members out of ten trainees. On September 27, Yushi and Sion announced they had graduated from the team through handwritten letters posted on the SM Rookies's Instagram. In September 2024, Shohei was announced as a member of SM's upcoming trot boy band, Mytro. The trot boy band debut was canceled without announcement and Shohei continue his solo activities under SM Japan. In November 2025, Shohei later transferred to SM's sub label SM C&C.

== Members ==
=== Debuted members ===
Stage name	Date introduced	Debut date	Debut group
Irene	December 9, 2013	August 1, 2014	Red Velvet
Seulgi	December 2, 2013	August 1, 2014	Red Velvet
Wendy	March 13, 2014	August 1, 2014	Red Velvet
Yeri	March 11, 2014 (Note: After Red Velvet debuted, Yeri was featured in one of the SM Rookies videos (under the name "New Rookie of SR14G") with the now-NCT members in 2014 and performed with the other SM Rookie girls the same year in SM Town Live World Tour IV. She was formally introduced just before Red Velvet's comeback with Ice Cream Cake in March 2015.)	March 17, 2015	Red Velvet
Taeyong	December 3, 2013	April 8, 2016	NCT
Doyoung	January 15, 2015	April 8, 2016	NCT
Ten	December 23, 2013	April 8, 2016	NCT
Jaehyun	December 9, 2013	April 8, 2016	NCT
Mark	December 16, 2013	April 8, 2016	NCT
Taeil	October 13, 2015 (Note: Before Taeil's introduction as an SM Rookies member, he previously performed alongside his now-NCT co-members during the SM Town Week in December 2013.)	April 9, 2016	NCT
Yuta	December 23, 2013	July 6, 2016	NCT
Winwin (윈윈)	January 5, 2016	July 6, 2016	NCT
Haechan	July 17, 2014 (Note: Haechan was introduced as Donghyuck but later went on with his current stage name upon his debut with NCT 127 in July 2016.)	July 6, 2016	NCT
Jeno	December 2, 2013	August 25, 2016	NCT
Jaemin	April 22, 2015 (Note: Jaemin was featured in several SM Rookies events before being formally introduced on April 22, 2015.)	August 25, 2016	NCT
Jisung	December 16, 2013	August 25, 2016	NCT
Johnny (쟈니)	December 23, 2013	January 4, 2017	NCT
Kun (쿤)	December 18, 2015 (Note: Despite being featured as a vocalist in the Chinese version of NCT U's "Without You" (2016), Kun did not make his official debut until the release of NCT's debut album, NCT 2018 Empathy in 2018.)	March 14, 2018	NCT
Jungwoo (정우)	April 17, 2017	February 18, 2018	NCT
Lucas	April 6, 2017	February 18, 2018	NCT
Xiaojun (샤오쥔)	July 17, 2018	January 17, 2019	NCT
Hendery (헨드리)	July 17, 2018	January 17, 2019	NCT
Yangyang (양양)	July 17, 2018	January 17, 2019	NCT
Ningning (닝닝)	September 19, 2016	November 17, 2020	Aespa
Lami (라미)	December 9, 2013	May 15, 2023	None (Note: Lami debuted as an actress.)
Eunseok (은석)	July 1, 2022	September 4, 2023	Riize
Seunghan (승한)	July 1, 2022	September 4, 2023	Riize
Sion (시온)	June 28, 2023	February 28, 2024	NCT
Yushi (유우시)	June 28, 2023	February 28, 2024	NCT
Shohei (쇼헤이)	July 1, 2022	TBA	Mytro

=== Former members ===
Stage name	Date introduced
Hansol (한솔)	December 16, 2013
Herin (혜린)	July 8, 2015
Hina (히나)	July 8, 2015
Koeun (고은)	July 8, 2015
Yiyang (이양)	September 19, 2016

== Filmography ==
=== Television shows ===
Year	Title	Member(s)
2014	Exo 90:2014	Hansol, Johnny, Taeyong, Yuta, Ten, Jaehyun, Mark, Haechan, Jeno, Jaemin, Jisung
2015	Show Champion	Doyoung and Jaehyun
2015	Non-Summit	Yuta
2015	Mickey Mouse Club	Koeun, Mark, Hina, Jeno, Haechan, Jaemin, Jisung, Herin, Lami; Doyoung, Jaehyun (guest performers)
2016	NCT Life	Hansol (Season 1); Kun, Winwin (Season 2)
2016	My SMT	Johnny (regular MC from Episode 5); Yiyang, Koeun, Hina, Ningning (Who's The Best? corner)
2022	Welcome to NCT Universe	Eunseok, Shohei, Seunghan
2023	NCT Universe: LASTART	Sion, Yushi

== Discography ==
=== Official releases ===
Title	Recorded by	Year	Album
"Because I Love You"	Wendy	2014	Mimi OST
"Butterfly"	Henry featuring Seulgi	2014	Fantastic
"Be Natural"	Red Velvet featuring Taeyong	2014	Non-album release
"Because of You"	Taeil	2015	The Merchant: Gaekju 2015 OST
"Without You" (Chinese version)	NCT U with Kun	2016	NCT 2018 Empathy
"Switch"	NCT 127 featuring SR15B	2016	NCT #127

=== Songs recorded ===
Names in italics indicate other trainees participating in the recording.

Song	Member(s)	Year	Other performer(s)	Note
"Be Natural"	Irene, Seulgi, Wendy	2014	Joy	Sung originally by S.E.S.; later released as a single and credited as Red Velvet.
"Open the Door"	Taeyong	2014		
"Bora-bit Hyanggi (Violet Fragrance)"	Yeri, Koeun, Hina, Herin, Jeesu, Winny (SM Town version); Koeun, Hina, Herin, Lami (Mickey Mouse Club version)	2014; 2015		Sung originally by Kang Su-ji; performed on the SM Town Live World Tour IV (2014–15) and the TV program Mickey Mouse Club (2015).
"No No No No No"	Yeri, Koeun, Hina, Herin, Jeesu, Winny (SM Town version); Koeun, Hina, Lami (Mickey Mouse Club version)	2014; 2015		Sung originally by Ha Su-bin; performed on the SM Town Live World Tour IV and Mickey Mouse Club.
"Hope"	Doyoung, Jaehyun, Johnny	2014	Chen (Exo)	Sung originally by H.O.T.; covered for the TV program Exo 90:2014 (2014); SM Town band instrumental version.
"I'm Your Girl"	Yeri, Koeun, Hina, Jeesu, Winny, Herin, Mark, Haechan	2014		Sung originally by S.E.S.; covered for Exo 90:2014
"Majimak Seungbu (The Last Game)"	Taeil	2014		Sung originally by Kim Min-gyo; covered for Exo 90:2014
"Yeoreum An-eseo (In Summer)"	Koeun	2014	Seulgi (Red Velvet)	Sung originally by Deux; covered for Exo 90:2014
"Under the Sea"	Doyoung, Jaehyun, Yuta, Ten, Mark, Haechan, Jaemin, Jeno, Jisung (SM Rookies Show version); Koeun, Hina, Lami, Herin, Mark, Haechan, Jaemin, Jeno, Jisung (Mickey Mouse Club version)	2015; 2016		Korean version sung originally by The Grace, Super Junior, and Zhang Liyin; performed in the SM Rookies Show (2015–16) and Mickey Mouse Club (2015).
"Shining Star"	Koeun, Hina, Ningning	2017		Song for the TV program Shining Star (2017).
"Dream Dream Dream"	Koeun, Hina (Korean version)Yiyang, Ningning (Chinese version)	2017		Song for the TV program Shining Star (2017).
"Checkmate"	Koeun, Hina (Korean version)Yiyang, Ningning (Chinese version)	2017		Sung originally by Girls' Generation-TTS; covered for Shining Star.
"Into the New World"	Koeun, Hina (Korean version)Yiyang, Ningning (Chinese version)	2017		Sung originally by Girls' Generation; covered for Shining Star.
"Ice Cream"	Koeun, Hina (Korean version)Yiyang, Ningning (Chinese version)	2017		Sung originally by f(x); covered for Shining Star.
"Run & Run"	Koeun, Hina (Korean version)Yiyang, Ningning (Chinese version)	2017		Song for Shining Star.
"Someday"	Koeun, Hina (Korean version)Yiyang, Ningning (Chinese version)	2018		Song for Shining Star.

== Concert participation ==
Names in italics indicate other trainees that participated in the event.

- SM Town Week (2013) (as opening act)
  - Taeil, Hansol, Johnny, Yuta, Ten, Jaehyun, Jeno, Haechan, Jisung, Yongju
- SM Town Live World Tour IV (2014–2015)
  - Hansol, Johnny, Taeyong, Yuta, Doyoung, Ten, Jaehyun, Yeri, Koeun, Mark, Jeno, Haechan, Hina, Jaemin, Jisung, Herin, Winny, Jeesu
- SM Rookies Show (2015–2016)
  - Taeil, Hansol, Johnny, Taeyong, Yuta, Doyoung, Ten, Jaehyun, Mark, Jeno, Haechan, Jaemin, Jisung
- SM Town Live 2022: SMCU Express (2022)
  - Shohei, Eunseok, Seunghan
- NCT Nation: To The World (2023)
  - Sion, Yushi (as members of pre-debut NCT New Team)
- SM Town Live 2025: The Culture, the Future (2025)
  - SMTR25

== See also ==
- K-pop -Trainee system
