= Exo 90:2014 =

- Also known as: Exo K-Pop Time Slip 90:2014
- Genre: Reality
- Presented by: Mnet
- Starring: Exo; Jun Hyun-moo; NCT (SR14B)
- Country of origin: South Korea
- Original language: Korean
- No. of seasons: 1
- No. of episodes: 11

Production
- Production location: South Korea
- Running time: 50 minutes

Original release
- Network: Mnet
- Release: August 15 – October 31, 2014

Exo 90:2014 is a South Korean reality TV show starring Exo and members of NCT. The show was aired on Mnet.

The first episode was aired on August 15, 2014. The show's host is Jun Hyun-moo.

== Background ==
Exo 90:2014 is a reality TV show where Exo members cover the most popular K-pop songs from the 1990s. Every episode, they team up with iconic 90s K-pop idols to recreate their songs and music videos.

Members of the boy band NCT (then-known under the name SM Rookies) also get to participate in the music videos and also perform live in the show.

== Episodes ==
Episode	Guest(s)	Exo members
1	Kangta (H.O.T.)	Suho, Baekhyun, Chanyeol, D.O., Kai & Sehun
2	Park Joon-hyung, Son Ho-young & Kim Tae-woo (G.O.D.)	Xiumin, Luhan, Suho, Lay, Chen & Sehun
3	Lee Min-woo & Shin Hye-sung (Shinhwa)	Xiumin, Chen, Kai & Sehun
4	Jo Sung-mo	Xiumin, Suho, Baekhyun, Chen & Tao
5	Brian Joo & Hwanhee (Fly to the Sky)	Xiumin, Suho, Lay, Baekhyun, Chen & Tao
6	Kim Jong-min (Koyote), Kim Jang-ryeol (DJ DOC) & Koo Jun-yup (Clon)	Suho, Baekhyun, Chanyeol, Kai & Sehun
7	Lee Guk-joo & Ahn Young-mi	Suho, Baekhyun, Chanyeol, Chen, D.O. & Sehun
8	Lyn & Shin Bora	Xiumin, Suho, Chen & D.O.
9	BoA	Xiumin, Luhan, Suho, Lay, Chen & Sehun
10	Lim Chang-jung	Xiumin, Suho, Chen & D.O.
11	Lee Hyun Do (Deux) & Muzie	Suho, Baekhyun, Chanyeol, Kai & Sehun

== Music videos remake ==
Episode	Artist	Song Title	Notes	Exo member
1	H.O.T.	"Hope"	Sung by Chen and SM Rookies' Johnny, Doyoung & Jaehyun	Chanyeol
2	G.O.D.	"어머님께 (To Mother)"	Original song used	Suho
3	Shinhwa	"Yo! "	Original song used	Sehun
4	Jo Sung-mo	"Do You Know"	Sung by Wendy of Red Velvet	Tao
5	Fly to the Sky	"Missing You"	Original song used	Lay
6	DJ DOC	"Dance with DOC"	Original song used	Baekhyun
7	S.E.S.	"I'm Your Girl"	Sung by SM Rookies' Yeri, Koeun, Mark, Hina, Donghyuck & Herin: other SM Trainees Winny & Jeesu	D.O.
8	Kim Min-Kyo	"The Last Game"	Sung by SM Rookies' Taeil	Luhan
9	BoA	"No.1"	Original song used	Chen
10	Lim Chang-jung	"소주 한 잔 (Glass Of Soju)"	Original song used	Xiumin
11	Deux	"In Summer"	Sung by SM Rookies Koeun and Seulgi of Red Velvet	Kai
