= Johnny (singer) =

American singer and television personality (born 1995)

- 쟈니
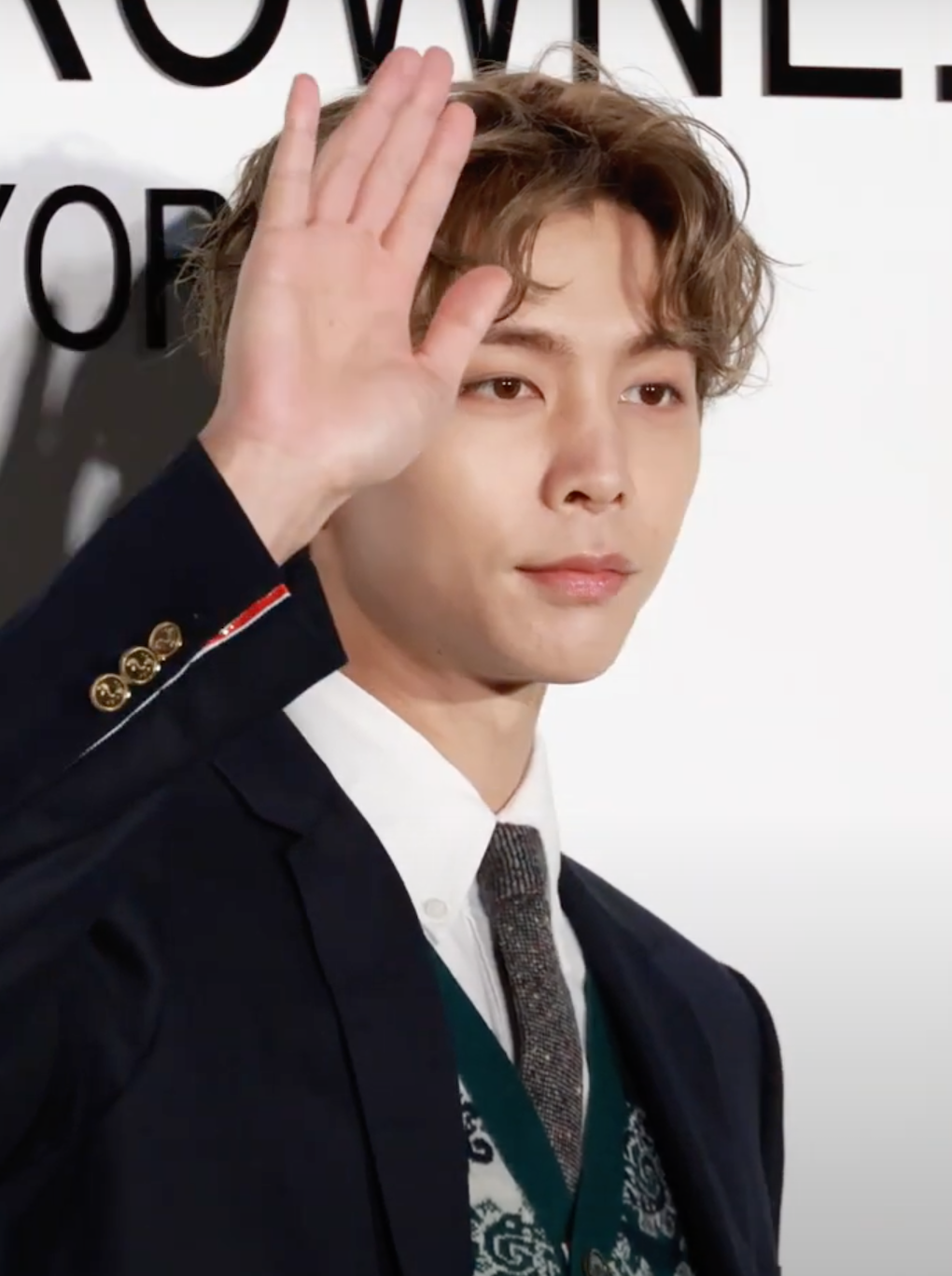
- Johnny in 2023
- Born: John Jeon Suh; February 9, 1995 (age 31); Chicago, Illinois, US
- Other name: Seo Young-ho
- Occupations: Singer; rapper; television personality
- Years active: 2013–present
- Musical career
- Origin: Seoul, South Korea
- Genre: K-pop
- Instrument: Vocals
- Label: SM
- Member of: NCT; NCT 127
- Formerly of: SM Rookies

Korean name
- Hangul: 서영호
- RR: Seo Yeongho
- MR: Sŏ Yŏngho

John Jeon Suh (born February 9, 1995), known professionally as Johnny (Korean: 쟈니), is an American singer, rapper, and television personality. He rose to prominence as a member of the K-pop boy band NCT and its sub-unit NCT 127.

Born and raised in Chicago, Johnny started training in South Korea under SM Entertainment in 2007. He began his career in 2013 as part of the label's official team of trainees, SM Rookies, appearing on television and touring both in the country and abroad. He made his debut in 2017 with NCT, which went on to achieve commercial success and become an influential K-pop act. Beyond his music career, Johnny has also hosted web shows and ventured into television, appearing on several variety shows.

== Life and career ==
=== 1995–2013: Early life and career beginnings ===
John Jeon Suh was born on February 9, 1995, in Northbrook, a suburb of Chicago, Illinois. His Korean name is Seo Young-ho. His mother worked as the broadcasting director of a media outlet based in the city. In 2007, encouraged by her, he auditioned for SM Entertainment and passed despite having no prior training in singing or dancing. He said that he grew up listening to artists such as Usher and did not know much about K-pop at the time. For the first three years, Johnny traveled to South Korea to train during his summer and winter breaks, practicing alongside future members of the boy band Exo. After graduating from Glenbrook North High School in 2013, he moved to Seoul permanently.

=== 2013–2024: SM Rookies and NCT ===
Johnny going to Music Bank in October 2018

SM publicly introduced Johnny as a member of its official training team, SM Rookies, on December 24, 2013, via its social media accounts alongside his fellow trainees Yuta and Ten. The agency's first program of its kind, SM Rookies allowed trainees to gain experience and public exposure before their debut, often grouping them by gender and concept into distinct units. As part of the team, Johnny appeared in the 2014 variety show Exo 90:2014 with Exo and served as an host on the variety show My SM Television, aired on Youku in 2016. He also participated in the concert tours SM Town Live World Tour IV (2014–2015), featuring several SM artists coming together to perform under the musical collective SM Town, and SM Rookies Show (2015–2016), held in South Korea and Thailand, in which the team covered songs by SM artists. Johnny performed his first DJ set at the Spectrum Dance Music Festival on October 1–2, 2016. Alongside the musicians and rappers Yoon Do-hyun, Inlayer, G2, and Reddy, he released the experimental single "Nightmare" on October 28, 2016, under the SM Station project.

In December 2016, SM announced that Johnny would join NCT, a boy band designed with a concept of unlimited members where smaller sub-units would debut independently and occasionally collaborate under the sub-unit NCT U. Johnny debuted on January 5, 2017, joining the group's second sub-unit, NCT 127, performing their second single, "Limitless", on the television music program M Countdown. Music critics described NCT 127 as the brand's flagship and most experimental unit, as well as the first SM group to base its sound primarily on hip-hop, often blending it with R&B and electronic music subgenres such as industrial and complextro. He contributed to the band's first full-group album, NCT 2018 Empathy (2018), and made his first appearance under NCT U with the track "Misfit", released in October 2020. Grammy.com stated that NCT became one of the most influential K-pop acts, achieving commercial success.

Johnny joined the cast of the OnStyle television series Lipstick Prince for its second season in March 2017. That same month, he began hosting the radio show NCT's Night Night! on SBS Power FM alongside his bandmate Jaehyun, eventually stepping down in January 2019 to focus on NCT 127's first concert tour, Neo City – The Origin (2019–2020). Later that November, he joined the cast of the SBS Plus variety show Everybody Cha Cha Cha, where a team of entertainment personalities was formed to compete in soccer matches against national teams. In January 2023, he performed a DJ set at the SM Town Live 2023: SMCU Palace New Year's show alongside DJs such as Hyo and Raiden. Johnny stepped back from promotional activities in June 2023 for a fractured clavicle.

=== 2025–present: Television work and hosting ===
In June 2025, Johnny appeared as a special judge on the reality competition series Be My Boyz alongside his bandmates Ten, Jungwoo, and Xiaojun. Later that September, he began hosting the second season of the Major League Baseball's talk show Merry Talk, accompanied by the former professional baseball players Kim Byung-hyun and Dustin Nippert. In October, he launched a YouTube channel called Johnny Says, starting a series where he talks to people on the street about their worries and offers them advice. That same month, Johnny hosted the MBC event MBC Virtual Live Festival. He then joined the SBS variety show Rising Eagles in November, after being selected by the former basketball players Seo Jang-hoon and Chon Tae-poong to form a basketball team composed of entertainment industry personalities to compete in matches.

In July 2026, Johnny starred in the ENA variety show All or Nothing, which followed the cast to Egypt, as they competed for the title of "prince". That same month, it was announced that he had renewed his exclusive contract with SM. Later that September, he launched his podcast Journey with Johnny on Spotify, where he talks about Korean culture as well as his personal experiences.

== Other ventures ==
=== Fashion and endorsements ===
In May 2022, Johnny was the only K-pop artist to attend the annual Met Gala, as the first guest of the fashion designer Peter Do; Paper reported that he was the most mentioned celebrity of the event on social media. In February 2023, he made his first appearance at the New York Fashion Week, attending Thom Browne's fashion show. The following year, he began collaborating with the Swedish fashion house Acne Studios, attending its fashion shows at the Paris Fashion Week. Acne Studios officially appointed Johnny as its global brand ambassador in February 2025, citing his influence, physique, and expressiveness. Starting in August 2025, he starred in a promotional campaign for the Scotch whisky brand Johnnie Walker. Johnny has also appeared on the cover of fashion magazines wearing Longines and Golden Goose.

=== Philanthropy ===
In March 2025, Johnny donated ₩50 million to the Hope Bridge Korea Disaster Relief Association to aid recovery efforts for the wildfires that broke out that month.

== Discography ==
=== Singles ===
List of singles, with year of release and associated album
Title	Year	Album
"Nightmare" (with Yoon Do-hyun, Inlayer, G2, and Reddy)	2016	Non-album single

=== Other charted songs ===
List of other charted songs, with year of release, selected chart positions, and associated album
Title	Year	Peak chart positions	Album
Title	Year	KOR DL	Album
"Good to Be Alive" (with Hyo, Key, Chen, Ningning, Ginjo, Raiden, Imlay, and Mar Vista)	2022	113	2022 Winter SM Town: SMCU Palace

=== Writing credits ===
Key
Indicates songs in which writers are credited specifically for the Korean lyrics

List of songs by name, with credited artist(s), lyricist(s), composer(s), associated album, and year of release
Title	Artist(s)	Lyricist(s)	Composer(s)	Album	Year	Ref.
"Beautiful"	NCT 2021	Yoo Young-jin; Taeyong; Mark; Johnny; Jeno; Hendery	Yoo Han-jin; Yoo Young-jin	Universe	2021	
"I Mean, It's About Time"	NCT 127	Wutan; Hwaji; Johnny; Taeyong	Bea Wheeler; Jack LaFrantz; Ido Zmishlany; Whitney Phillips	Blingy	2026	
"Love Song" (우산)	NCT 127	Seo Ji-eum; Taeyong; Mark; Johnny	The Stereotypes; Deez; Bianca Atterberry	Neo Zone	2020	
"Pandora's Box" (낮잠)	NCT 127	JQ; Hyeon Ji-won; Kim Hye-ji; Taeyong; Mark; Johnny	Erik Lidbom	Neo Zone	2020	

== Filmography ==
=== Television ===
Year	Title	Role	Notes	Ref.
2017	Lipstick Prince	Cast member	Season 2	
2019–2020	Everybody Cha Cha Cha (다함께 차차차)	Cast member		
2025	Be My Boyz	Special judge	Episodes 2–3	
2025–2026	Rising Eagles	Cast member		
2026	All or Nothing (왕자와 거지)	Cast member		

=== Web ===
Year	Title	Role	Ref.
2025–2026	Merry Talk (메리톡)	Host	
2025	MBC Virtual Live Festival (MBC 버추얼 라이브 페스티벌)	Host	

=== Podcast ===
Year	Title	Role	Ref.
2026	Journey with Johnny	Host	

=== Music video ===
Year	Title	Artist	Ref.
2016	"Ready for Your Love"	J-Min	

== Accolades ==
=== Awards and nominations ===
List of awards and nominations, with name of the award, year of ceremony, recipient, category, and result of the nomination
Award	Year	Recipient	Category	Result	Ref.
Korea Grand Music Awards	2025	Johnny	Trend of the Year – K-pop Solo	Nominated	

=== Listicles ===
List of listicle placements, with name of the publisher, year of listing, name of the listicle, and placement
Publisher	Year	Listicle	Placement	Ref.
Billboard	2024	K-Pop Artist 100	78th	
