= Yūta =

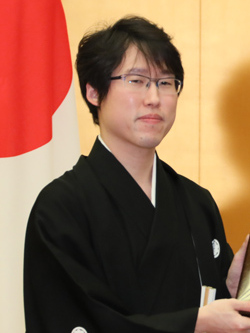
- Yuta Iyama, Japanese Go player
- Pronunciation: /jɯːta/ (IPA)
- Gender: Male

Origin
- Origin: Japanese
- Meaning: Different meanings depending on the kanji used

Other names
- Alternative spelling: Yuta (Kunrei-shiki) Yuta (Nihon-shiki) Yūta, Yuta, Yuuta (Hepburn)

Yūta, Yuta or Yuuta is a common masculine Japanese given name.

== Written forms ==
Yūta can be written using different combinations of kanji characters. Some examples:

- 勇太, "courage, thick"
- 勇汰, "courage, excessive"
- 勇多, "courage, many"
- 雄太, "masculinity, thick"
- 雄汰, "masculinity, excessive"
- 雄多, "masculinity, many"
- 友太, "friend, thick"
- 友汰, "friend, excessive"
- 友多, "friend, many"
- 有太, "possessing/having, thick"
- 有汰, "possessing/having, excessive"
- 有多, "possessing/having, many"
- 裕太, "abundant, thick"
- 裕汰, "abundant, excessive"
- 裕多, "abundant, many"
- 悠太, "long time, thick"
- 悠汰, "long time, excessive"
- 悠多, "long time, many"

The name can also be written in hiragana ゆうた or katakana ユウタ.

== Notable people with the name ==
- Yuta (Russian singer) (born 1979), Russian singer
- Yuta Abe (安部 雄大; born 1974), Japanese footballer
- Yuta Arakawa (荒川 雄太; born 1987), Japanese baseball player
- Yuta Baba (馬場 憂太; born 1984), Japanese footballer
- Yuta Bando (坂東 悠汰; born 1996), Japanese long-distance runner
- Yuta Bandoh (坂東 祐大; born 1991), Japanese composer
- Yuta Furukawa (古川 雄大,; born 1987), Japanese actor, singer, songwriter and model
- Yuta Higuchi (樋口 雄太; born 1996), Japanese footballer
- Yuta Hiraoka (平岡 祐太; born 1984), Japanese actor
- Yuta Ikeda (池田 勇太; born 1985), Japanese golfer
- Yuta Ito (伊藤 優汰; born 1992), Japanese footballer
- Yuta Iwasada (born 1991), Japanese baseball player
- Yuta Iyama (井山 裕太; born 1989), Japanese Go player
- Yuta Kanai (金井 勇太; born 1985), Japanese actor
- Yuta Kimura (木村 雄太; born 1985), Japanese baseball player
- Yuta Kinowaki (木脇 悠太; born 1991), Japanese footballer
- Yuta Kobayashi (小林 祐太; born 1987), Japanese basketball player
- Yuta Komori (古森 悠太; born 1995), Japanese shogi player
- Yuta Konagaya (小長谷 勇太; born 1993), Japanese footballer
- Yuta Konishi (小西 勇太; born 1990), Japanese hurdler
- Yuta Kubo (久保 優太; born 1987), Japanese kickboxer
- Yuta Mikado (三門 雄大; born 1986), Japanese footballer
- Yuta Minami (南 雄太; born 1979), Japanese footballer
- Yuta Muto (武藤 祐太; born 1989), Japanese baseball player
- Yuta Nakamoto (中本 悠太; born 1995), Japanese singer, member of South Korean boy group NCT
- Yuta Nakano (musician) (中野 雄太, born 1980), Japanese music composer and arranger
- Yuta Nakazawa (中沢 佑太, born 1972), Japanese footballer
- Yuta Omine (大嶺 祐太; born 1988), Japanese baseball player
- Yuta Ozawa (小澤 雄太; born 1985), Japanese actor
- Yuta Sasaki (佐々木 佑太; born 1989), Japanese mixed martial artist
- Yuta Sato (佐藤 祐太; born 1995), Japanese footballer
- Yuta Someya (染谷 悠太; born 1986), Japanese footballer
- Yuta Tabuse (田臥 勇太; born 1980), Japanese basketball player
- Yuuta Takahashi (高橋 優太; born 1984), Japanese actor
- Yuta Togashi (富樫 佑太; born 1995), Japanese footballer
- Yuta Watanabe (渡邊 雄太; born 1994), Japanese basketball player
- Yuta Watanabe (badminton) (渡辺 勇大; born 1997), Japanese badminton player
- Yuta Watase (渡瀬 雄太; born 1982), Japanese ski jumper
- Yuta Yazaki (矢嵜 雄大; born 1980), Japanese judoka
- Yuta Yoneyama (米山 裕太; born 1984), Japanese volleyball player

== Fictional characters ==
- Yuta (湧太), protagonist of the manga series Mermaid Saga
- Yuta Aoi (葵 ゆうた), a character from the franchise Ensemble Stars!
- Yuta Asaba (浅羽 悠太), a character in the manga series Kimi to Boku
- Yuta Asahina (朝日奈 悠太), a character in the video game Danganronpa Another Episode: Ultra Despair Girls
- Yuta Hibiki (響 裕太), a character in the anime series SSSS.Gridman
- Yuta Midorikawa (緑川 ゆうた), a character in the anime series Smile PreCure! (known as Hugo Swanson in English)
- Yuta Okkotsu (乙骨 憂太), protagonist of anime movie Jujutsu Kaisen 0, and second year student in Jujutsu Kaisen anime series.
- Yuta Saitoh, an antagonist of the television drama series Pulang Araw
- Yuta Togashi (富樫 勇太), protagonist of the light novel/anime series Love, Chunibyo & Other Delusions

== See also ==
- Yuta, alternative name for a mokoshi, Japanese architectural feature
