= Taeil (singer) =

South Korean singer (born 1994)

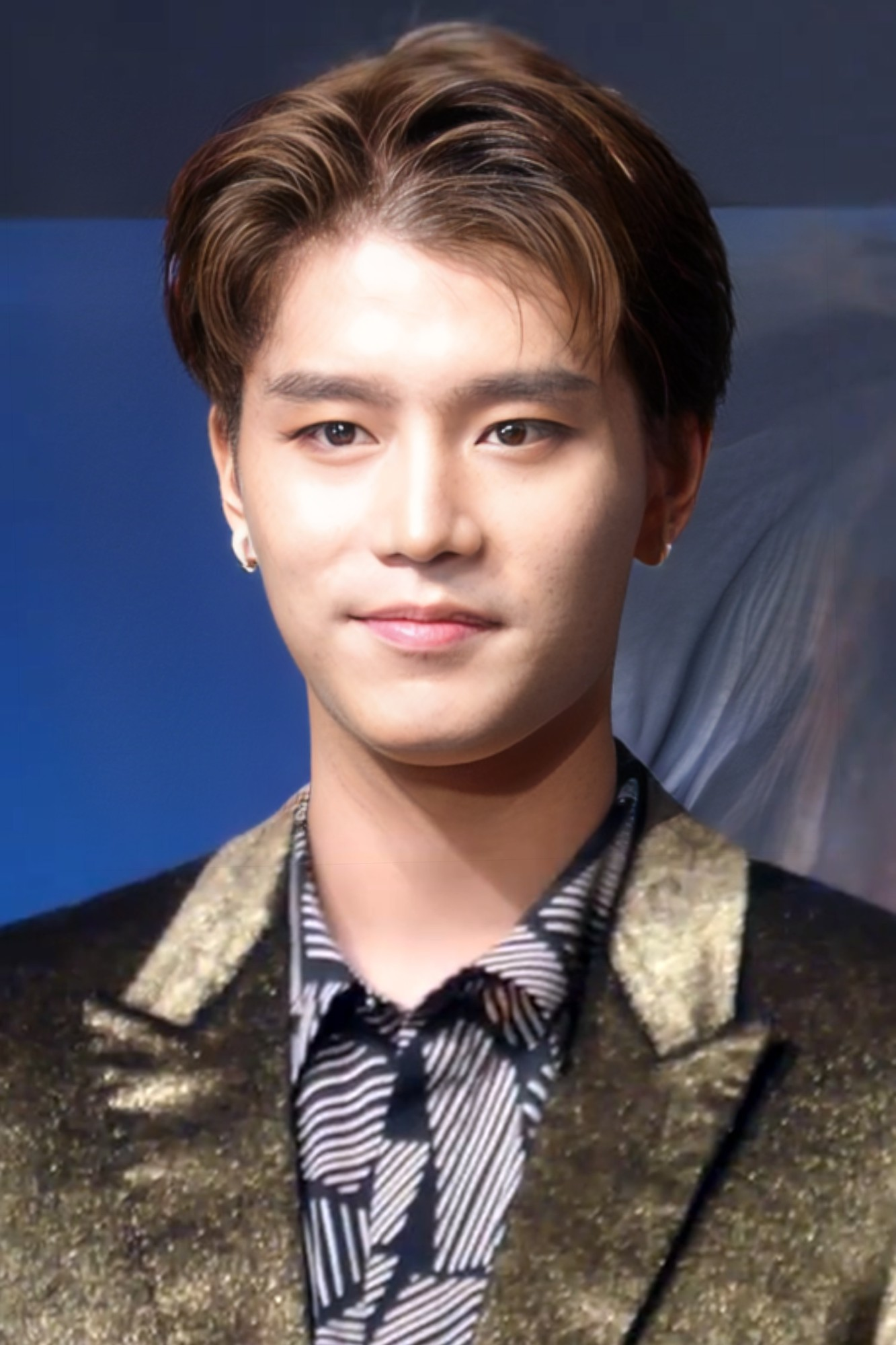
- Taeil in May 2019
- Born: Moon Tae-il; June 14, 1994 (age 32); Seoul, South Korea
- Occupation: Singer
- Musical career
- Genre: K-pop
- Instrument: Vocals
- Years active: 2015–2024
- Label: SM
- Formerly of: NCT; NCT U; NCT 127; SM Town
- Criminal information
- Conviction: Quasi-rape
- Penalty: 3 years and 6 months imprisonment

Korean name
- Hangul: 문태일
- RR: Mun Taeil
- MR: Mun T'aeil

Signature
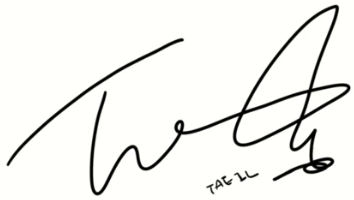

Moon Tae-il (Korean: 문태일, born June 14, 1994), known mononymously as Taeil, is a South Korean former singer. He was a member of the South Korean boy band NCT from 2016 until 2024, when Korean investigators tied him to a criminal sexual offense.

After being accepted as a trainee by SM Entertainment in 2013, Taeil was introduced as a member of the company's pre-debut training team, SM Rookies. He later made his official debut as a singer in NCT's first sub-unit NCT U and as the lead vocalist of its Korean-based sub-unit NCT 127, in 2016. A standout and popular member of the group, Taeil broke the Guinness World Record for "Fastest time to reach 1 million followers on Instagram" after starting his account on July 6, 2021.

In June 2024, Taeil and two other men raped an intoxicated Chinese tourist they encountered at a bar. After a two-month investigation tied him to the case, he officially left NCT on August 28, later pleading guilty to the crimes. On July 10, 2025, Taeil was sentenced to 3.5 years in prison.

== Early life ==
Moon Tae-il was born on June 14, 1994, in Seoul, South Korea. He was accepted to the Applied Music program of Hanyang University in 2013; that year, the program was reportedly the most competitive early-admissions program in the country, topping law and medicine at other prestigious schools. Taeil decided not to enroll in university after being accepted by SM Entertainment as a trainee.

== Career ==
=== 2015–2016: Pre-debut in SM Rookies ===
On October 13, 2015, Taeil was introduced as a member of SM Entertainment's pre-debut training team, SM Rookies. On January 27, 2016, Taeil released "Because of You" (단 한 사람) as a soundtrack for the TV series The Merchant: Gaekju 2015.

=== 2016–2021: Debut with NCT, soundtrack appearances and solo work ===
Taeil made his official debut as a member of NCT U, a rotational subgroup of NCT, on April 9, 2016, with the release of the single "Without You". Taeil later made his debut as a member of NCT 127, the second fixed sub-unit of NCT, with the release of the EP NCT#127 on July 7. On December 30, Taeil participated in the SM Station charity single "Sound of Your Heart" (너의 목소리), a collaboration with SM artists (Yesung, Sunny, Luna, Wendy, Seulgi and Doyoung) and pianist Steve Barakatt.

As NCT U, Taeil, Taeyong and Doyoung released the song "Stay in My Life" on August 7, 2017, as a soundtrack for School 2017. Taeil, Doyoung, and Jaehyun then released the NCT U single "Timeless" (텐데...) on January 12, 2018. Taeil and Doyoung again collaborated as NCT U on "Radio Romance", a soundtrack for Radio Romance, released on January 30, 2018. On September 7, 2018, Taeil and Jaehyun released the NCT U song "New Dream" as a soundtrack for Dokgo Rewind.

On March 30, 2019, Taeil was featured in Sohlhee's debut single "Purple" (보라색). In November, he competed on the television show King of Mask Singer under the nickname "King Card". On December 13, Taeil, Doyoung, Jaehyun and Haechan released the NCT U single "Coming Home", an SM Station collaboration with UNICEF. The song reached number seven on the Billboard World Digital Song Sales chart.

On April 11, 2021, Taeil featured on Moon Su-jin's single "The Moon" (저 달). On June 6, Taeil released "A Beautiful Human Being" (아름다운 사람) the second part of Morning Dew 50th Anniversary Tribute Album, a tribute to musician Kim Min-ki. On June 28, the fourth part of the album, featuring "Morning Dew" sung by various artists including Taeil, was released. On July 6, Taeil launched an Instagram account and broke the Guinness World Record for "Fastest time to reach 1 million followers on Instagram", previously held by Rupert Grint since November 2020.

On October 11, Taeil, along with rapper Lil Boi, featured on Raiden's single "Love Right Back" from his debut EP of the same name. They performed the song together on M Countdown and Inkigayo that month. On December 27, SM Entertainment released the album 2021 Winter SMTOWN: SMCU Express, which includes the song "Ordinary Day", sung by Taeil and label mates Onew and Kyuhyun.

=== 2022–2024: NCT Lab contributions and removal from NCT ===
On February 13, 2022, Taeil released "Starlight" for the soundtrack of the TV series Twenty-Five, Twenty-One. The song peaked at number 30 on the Gaon Digital Chart, and was nominated for awards for best soundtrack at the 32nd Seoul Music Awards and at the 8th APAN Star Awards. On July 19, Taeil, alongside NCT members Kun and Yangyang, released the NCT U single "Rain Day" as part of the NCT Lab singles project. On December 26, SM Entertainment released the album 2022 Winter SM Town: SMCU Palace, featuring the song "Happier", sung by Taeil and label mates Kangta, Yesung, Suho, and Renjun.

On February 9, 2023, Taeil released "Lovey Dovey" as the soundtrack of the TV series Love to Hate You. On September 7, Taeil and Haechan released the NCT U single "N.Y.C.T" for the NCT Lab project. Both members participated in writing the song. Later that month, on September 22, Taeil released "Bandit" as the main soundtrack of the Netflix series Song of the Bandits.

Taeil released "Wave" (파랑), a soundtrack for Captivating the King, on February 4, 2024. On March 12, he released the single "Weird" (묘해, 너와), a remake of Acoustic Collabo's soundtrack from the 2014 TV series Discovery of Love. The song reached number 132 on the Circle Digital Chart.

On August 28, 2024, SM Entertainment announced Taeil's removal from NCT following sexual offense allegations. On October 16, SM Entertainment announced the termination of Taeil's contract through a mutual agreement.

== Personal life and rape conviction ==
=== Car accident ===
On August 15, 2023, Taeil was involved in a car accident in downtown Seoul while returning home by motorcycle after finishing his schedule early in the morning. He temporarily suspended his public scheduled activities to focus on treatment and recovery.

=== Sexual offense charges ===
On June 13, 2024, Taeil and two unknown friends dragged an inebriated woman (who was a tourist from China) from a bar in Itaewon into a taxi. The three later raped her in one of their residences in Bangbae-dong. After a report filed by the victim in mid-June, Taeil and his associates were investigated by authorities for two months. Taeil and his label SM Entertainment were notified of the investigation in mid-August. After a search was conducted, Taeil and his associates wrote a confession letter to authorities, claiming that the crime was accidental.

On August 28, 2024, SM Entertainment abruptly announced on that Taeil would be removed from the NCT line-up due to the ongoing investigation, with the case not having been made public up to that point. Following the announcement, fans of his former group created edits to remove him from songs and group images, and staff at a pop-up booth held in collaboration with Incheon International Airport covered up his pictures. On September 13, the Seoul Bangbae Police Station announced that the case had been handed over to prosecutors the previous day. As a result of the case, SM announced that they would be terminating Taeil's contract on October 16.

On March 4, 2025, Taeil was indicted on the charges. On June 18, he and his two co-defendants, surnamed Lee and Hong, pleaded guilty to aggravated rape. The prosecution sought a sentence of seven years' imprisonment. On July 10, Taeil and his accomplices were sentenced to three and a half years in prison, with the court also requiring 40 hours of educational programming related to sexual violence and to register all three defendants as sexual offenders in their neighborhoods of residence. They are also banned from working professionally in a career field related to children and youths for the next five years. In October and December 2025, the Seoul High Court and Supreme Court respectively denied his appeals for a shorter sentence.

== Discography ==
=== Singles ===
List of singles, showing year released, selected chart positions, and name of the album
Title	Year	Peak chart positions		Album
Title	Year	KOR	KOR Down.	Album
As lead artist
"A Beautiful Human Being" (아름다운 사람)	2021	—	169	Morning Dew 50th Anniversary Tribute to Kim Min-Gi Vol.1
"Weird" (묘해, 너와)	2024	132	31	About Love
As featured artist
"Purple" (보라색) (with Sohlhee)	2019	—	—	Purple
"The Moon" (저 달) (with Moon Su-jin)	2021	—	90	Non-album single
"Love Right Back" (with Raiden, IIIBOI)	2021	—	83	Love Right Back
Collaborations
"Sound of Your Heart" (너의 목소리) (as part of SM Town with Steve Barakatt)	2016	—	—	SM Station Season 1
"Morning Dew" (아침이슬) (with various artists)	2021	—	—	Morning Dew 50th Anniversary Tribute to Kim Min-Gi Vol.4
"Ordinary Day" (with Onew and Kyuhyun)	2021	—	69	2021 Winter SMTOWN: SMCU Express
"—" denotes a recording that did not chart

=== Soundtrack appearances ===
List of songs, showing year released, selected chart positions, and name of the album
Title	Year	Peak chart positions		Album
Title	Year	KOR Gaon	KOR Hot	Album
"Because of You" (단 한 사람)	2016	— (Note: "Because of You" did not enter Gaon Digital Chart, but peaked at position 47 on component BGM Chart.)	—	The Merchant: Gaekju 2015 OST
"Starlight" (스타라이트)	2022	30	28	Twenty-Five Twenty-One OST
"Lovey Dovey" (러비 더비)	2023	— (Note: "Lovey Dovey" did not enter the Circle Digital Chart, but it peaked at number 112 on the component Download Chart.)	—	Love to Hate You OST
"Bandit"	2023	— (Note: "Bandit" did not enter the Circle Digital Chart, but it peaked at number 143 on the component Download Chart.)	—	Song of the Bandits OST
"Wave" (파랑)	2024	— (Note: "Wave" did not enter the Circle Digital Chart, but it peaked at number 44 on the component Download Chart.)	—	Captivating the King OST
"Stay By My Side" (내 곁에 있어요)	2024	— (Note: "Stay By My Side" did not enter the Circle Digital Chart, but it peaked at number 140 on the component Download Chart.)	—	Missing Crown Prince OST Part 2
"—" denotes a recording that did not chart

=== Composition credits ===
All credits are adapted from the Korea Music Copyright Association, unless cited otherwise.

List of songs, showing year released, artist name, and name of the album
Title	Year	Artist	Album	Lyricist	Composer
"Will Be"	2023	Taeil	Non-album release (Note: "Will Be" was included in the documentary series NCT 127: The Lost Boys.)	Yes	Yes
"N.Y.C.T."	2023	NCT U (Taeil, Haechan)	NCT Lab	Yes	Yes
"Love Is a Beauty"	2023	NCT 127	Fact Check	Yes	No

== Filmography ==
=== Television shows ===
Year	Title	Role	Notes	Ref.
2016	Idol Chef King	Contestant		
2019	King of Mask Singer	Contestant	As King Card (Episode 229)	

== Awards and nominations ==
Name of the award ceremony, year presented, category, nominee of the award, and the result of the nomination
Award ceremony	Year	Category	Nominee / Work	Result	Ref.
APAN Star Awards	2022	Best Original Soundtrack	"Starlight"	Nominated	
Seoul Music Awards	2022	Original Soundtrack Award	"Starlight"	Nominated	

=== World records ===
Key
†	Indicates a formerly held record (Note: This does not indicate that the record was lost, only that it was eventually surpassed.)

Name of record body, year the record was awarded, and the name of the record
Publication	Year	World record	Ref.
Guinness World Records	2021	† Fastest time to reach 1 million followers on Instagram (Note: 1 hour and 45 minutes)	
