= Haechan =

South Korean singer and dancer (born 2000)

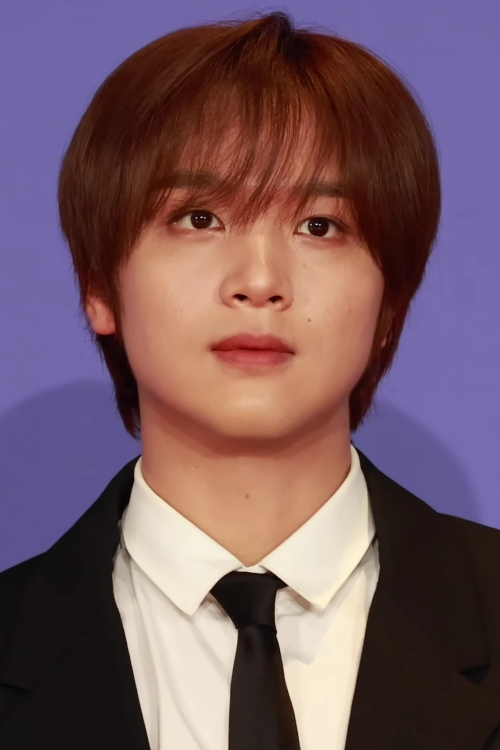
- Haechan in 2025
- Born: Lee Dong-hyuck; June 6, 2000 (age 26); Seoul, South Korea
- Occupations: Singer; dancer
- Years active: 2014–present
- Musical career
- Genres: K-pop; R&B; soul
- Instrument: Vocals
- Label: SM
- Member of: NCT; NCT 127; NCT Dream
- Formerly of: SM Rookies

Korean name
- Hangul: 이동혁
- RR: I Donghyeok
- MR: I Tonghyŏk

Stage name
- Hangul: 해찬
- RR: Haechan
- MR: Haech'an

Lee Dong-hyuck (Korean: 이동혁; born June 6, 2000), known professionally as Haechan (해찬), is a South Korean singer and dancer. Known for his distinctive vocal timbre, he rose to prominence as a member of the K-pop boy band NCT and its sub-units NCT 127 and NCT Dream.

Born in Seoul and raised in the city and Jeju, Haechan started training under SM Entertainment in 2013. He began his career in 2014 as part of the label's official team of trainees, SM Rookies, appearing on television and touring both in South Korea and abroad. He made his debut in 2016 with NCT, going on to release over 30 albums and participate in ten concert tours. The group achieved commercial success and became an influential K-pop act. Developed with the songwriter and producer Deez, Haechan's debut studio album, the R&B and soul record Taste (2025), topped the Circle Album Chart and sold over 400,000 copies in South Korea.

== Life and career ==
=== 2000–2013: Early life and musical beginnings ===
Lee Dong-hyuck was born on June 6, 2000, in Seoul, South Korea, as the oldest of four siblings. His parents, both musicians active in the local music scene, influenced his interest in music. Due to financial reasons, his mother moved to Jeju for work during his childhood, while Lee remained in Seoul with his father and grandparents. He grew particularly close to his grandmother, whom he credits with raising him until the age of six, when he joined his mother in Jeju. A band vocalist who enjoyed artists like Jaurim and Metallica, she influenced his musical taste by often bringing him to the noraebang and introducing him to singers like Michael Jackson. Lee said that he first listened to Jackson's single "Billie Jean" (1983) around the age of 10 and became "obsessed" with his music for a few years afterwards. He also admired several artists from SM Entertainment, particularly Taemin of Shinee, a group he first discovered through their debut single "Replay" (2008). Taemin later inspired him to audition for the label. In fifth grade, Lee passed the first round of an audition, but he struggled around the time of the second round due to the sudden death of his grandfather. He said that watching television music programs brought him comfort and happiness in that period.

Lee's mother initially opposed his ambition to become a singer but encouraged him to attend the SM Saturday Open Auditions in 2013. After passing multiple rounds by performing songs like "Hello" by Huh Gak, "Baby" by Justin Bieber, and "The Ugly Duckling" by Son Seung-yeon, he joined the label to begin training in Seoul, having drawn attention due to his high vocal range. At SM, trainees could receive lessons in singing, musical instruments, acting, modeling, beatboxing, public speaking, foreign languages, and dance styles such as ballet and jazz, depending on their interests and strengths. Teachers encouraged them to emulate their favorite artists, which sparked Lee's renewed interest in Jackson. Aspiring to become a well-rounded artist like him, Lee began composing songs on the piano around the age of 15, seeking feedback from his piano teacher. He then persuaded his mother to buy him a MacBook laptop to explore music production with the software Logic Pro. Outside of SM, Lee also worked with the vocal coach and singer-songwriter Lim Han-byul, who named him among the students he was most proud to have taught. Meanwhile, he studied in the Applied Music department of the School of Performing Arts Seoul.

=== 2014–2024: SM Rookies and NCT ===
SM publicly introduced Lee as a member of its official training team, SM Rookies, on July 17, 2014, with a video of him and his fellow trainee Mark launching the group's website. The agency's first program of its kind, SM Rookies allowed trainees to gain experience and public exposure before their debut, often grouping them by gender and concept into distinct units. As part of the team, Lee appeared on the 2014 variety television series Exo 90:2014 with the boy band Exo and the 2015 South Korean revival of The Mickey Mouse Club (1995–1996) with Super Junior's Leeteuk, performing songs, dances, and comedy skits. Lee also participated in the concert tours SM Town Live World Tour IV (2014–2015), featuring several SM artists coming together to perform under the musical collective SM Town, and SM Rookies Show (2015–2016), held in South Korea and Thailand, in which the team covered songs by SM artists.

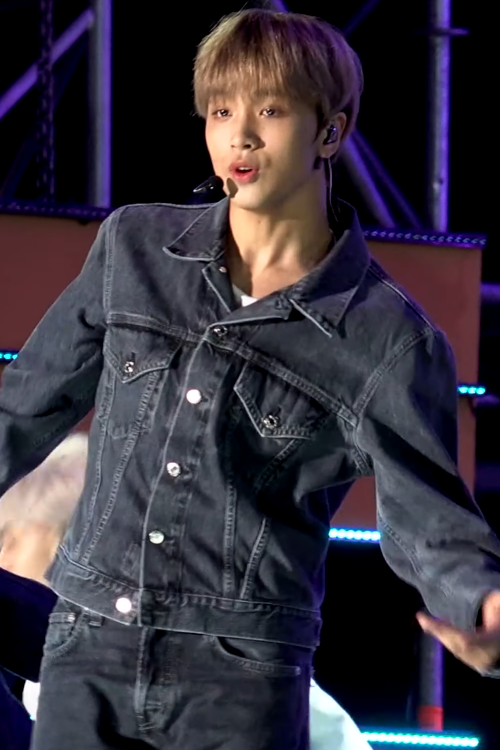
Haechan performing at the Incheon Sky Festival in August 2019

In July 2016, SM announced that Lee would join NCT, a boy band designed with a concept of unlimited members where smaller sub-units would debut independently and occasionally collaborate under the sub-unit NCT U. Lee debuted on July 7 with NCT's second sub-unit, NCT 127, performing their first single, "Fire Truck", on the television music program M Countdown. Upon debuting, Lee adopted the stage name Haechan, chosen by SM's founder Lee Soo-man, which means to "shine bright uprightly" in Korean. Music critics described NCT 127 as the brand's flagship and most experimental unit, as well as the first SM group to base its sound primarily on hip-hop, often blending it with R&B and electronic music subgenres such as industrial and complextro. Later that August, SM announced Haechan's addition to NCT's third sub-unit, NCT Dream, who made their debut with a performance of their single "Chewing Gum" on M Countdown on August 25. Initially established as NCT's teen unit, all members debuted as minors under a graduation system where they would leave the group upon reaching adulthood; however, the graduation concept was scrapped in 2020. Critics described NCT Dream as the unit with the most compelling narrative, remarking on how their transition from teen pop to a blend of hip-hop and R&B music reflected the members' artistic growth from adolescence to adulthood.

Haechan released over 30 studio albums and extended plays while participating in ten concert tours with the group. He contributed to the band's first full-group album, NCT 2018 Empathy (2018), and made his first appearance under NCT U with the single "Coming Home", released on December 13, 2019. Grammy.com stated that NCT became one of the most influential K-pop acts, achieving commercial success, with units like NCT Dream recording ten consecutive million-seller albums. Alongside the rapper Mark, who later departed the group in 2026, Haechan was the only NCT member to maintain a permanent position in two separate sub-units, resulting in a dense schedule. Dispatch remarked that they participated in an uncommonly high number of promotional cycles, notably releasing five albums per year in both 2021 and 2023 while switching units at roughly two-month intervals. Critics described their overlapping participation across multiple units as a "painful" side effect of the NCT system. Haechan stepped back from promotional activities thrice due to medical reasons: from December 2018 to March 2019 for a fractured tibia, in January 2023 for heart palpitations, and in January 2024 for severe tonsillitis.

After debuting, Haechan continued pursuing songwriting and began asking SM's A&R team for spare demos to practice writing top lines. He started collaborating with the songwriter and record producer Deez after working together on NCT 127's third studio album, Neo Zone (2020). The creative partnership led to the R&B tracks "Love Sign" and "N.Y.C.T", which Haechan and his former bandmate Taeil performed at NCT 127's second concert tour, Neo City – The Link (2021–2022). In March 2022, Haechan released a remake of Toy's 2001 track "Good Person" for the soundtrack of Playlist Studio's web series Ply Friends: Seoyeon University Class of '22. The following year, "N.Y.C.T" was officially released under NCT U on September 7 via the NCT Lab project. An R&B and pop track featuring guitar, bass, and brass over a piano melody, it depicts the emotions felt in moments with fans, likening the experience to walking together along the streets of New York City under the moonlight.

=== 2025–present: Taste ===
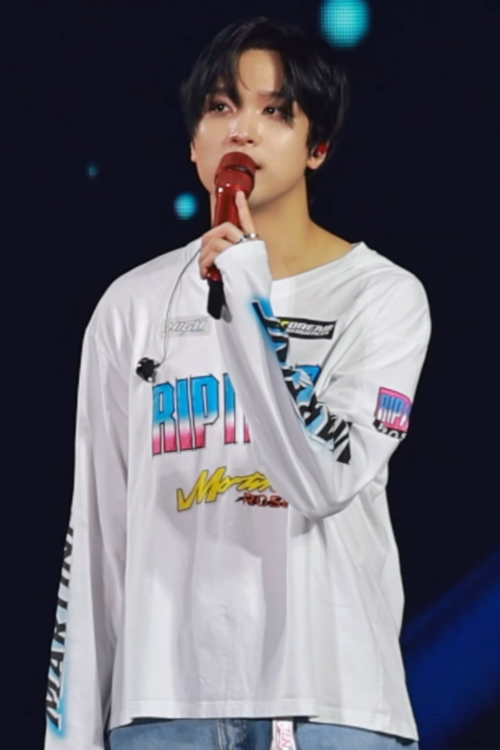
Haechan at the Dream Show 4: Dream the Future in November 2025

In March 2025, Haechan featured on "+82 Pressin'", the third single from Mark's first studio album, The Firstfruit (2025). Referencing South Korea's country calling code, the hip-hop track features lyrics written by Mark that express the duo's confidence in their capabilities, as they alternate roles with Haechan rapping and Mark singing. They first performed the song on M Countdown and later at the Tokyo dates of the SM Town Live 2025: The Culture, the Future tour. Later that May, Haechan released "A Thousand Reasons" for the soundtrack of the television series Second Shot at Love (2025). In July, Maeil Business Newspaper confirmed that he would make his solo debut in September, scheduled to follow the conclusion of group activities for NCT 127's fourth concert tour, Neo City – The Momentum, and NCT Dream's fifth studio album, Go Back to the Future, while he would continue participating in the latter's fourth concert tour, the Dream Show 4: Dream the Future (2025–2026).

In August, Haechan announced that he would release his first studio album, Taste, on September 8, along its lead single "Crzy". He had begun developing the record in 2024 in collaboration with Deez, who worked on nine of the album's 11 tracks. With Taste, Haechan aimed to showcase his personal musical preferences and explore different styles of vocal delivery. Ahead of the launch, SM released teasers featuring song snippets, and Haechan hosted a listening event in Seoul. He then promoted the album with performances on television music programs in South Korea in September and fan meetings in Japan in October. In the first week of release, Taste topped Circle's Album and Retail Album charts, while "Crzy" peaked atop the Download and BGM charts and reached number 11 on the Digital chart. The album sold over 400,000 copies and received a platinum certification in South Korea, while it entered the top five of the Oricon Albums Chart in Japan. Taste received positive reviews, with critics praising its cohesive musical narrative and Haechan's vocal performance. It earned a nomination for Millions Top 10 at the 2025 Melon Music Awards.

In March 2026, Haechan and his bandmate Taeyong released the funk song "Bitter Sweet (Addiction)" for the soundtrack of the thriller television series Mad Concrete Dreams (2026). Later that May, Haechan performed several songs from Taste live at the Seoul Jazz Festival. In July, ten years after his debut, it was announced that Haechan had renewed his exclusive contract with SM.

== Artistry ==
=== Voice ===
Haechan's vocal timbre has been described as distinctive and received praise in critical reviews. His voice has been characterized as "delicate, high-pitched" and "youthful, bright, yet with a strong core" by IZM and the critic Kim Young-dae, respectively. Calling it uncommon in South Korea, Kim initially compared Haechan to a young Michael Jackson from the Jackson 5 era, later placing his "refreshing" vocals in a lineage with a young Whitney Houston and the R&B trio SWV. Critics found his voice to be particularly suited to R&B across NCT's discography, while Sports Donga praised his handling of soul on Taste. Haechan's voice has been described as versatile and flexible, with Clash praising his dexterity across harmonies, melismas, falsettos, and ad-libs; he has also incorporated rapping into his work. The critic Choi Seung-in characterized him as a "performance-oriented" singer leading the arrangement, rather than a vocalist "merely [...] layered over the track".

Critics have called Haechan a standout, signature voice in NCT's discography since "Fire Truck", prompting The Hollywood Reporter to describe him as one of the group's "most valuable players". Kim compared his voice to a flavor enhancer that connects the different musical elements and leaves a "powerful" impression through the ad-libs, especially praising his work on Neo Zone. Haechan has been recognized for his ability to shift the mood of a track with his timbre, particularly in the second verses and bridges of songs such as NCT 127's "Kick It" (2020) and "Fact Check" (2023). (Note: Attributed to multiple references:)

=== Musical style and influences ===
Haechan said that he was initially undecided on which genre to pursue, but credited his collaboration with Deez for inspiring his decision to create his own R&B music. His debut album primarily explores various subgenres of R&B and soul, reminiscent of musical stylings spanning from the 1990s to the 2010s, with Kim noting influences of Motown, Philadelphia soul, and early Chris Brown. Haechan's music also incorporates elements of pop, hip-hop, dance, and funk. He has cited Jackson and Usher among his influences, and his musical style has also drawn comparisons to early Justin Timberlake.

=== Performance ===
Teen Vogue called Haechan's performance "suave" and praised his ability to hold back and exert control and precision over his movements, adding that "that's when you feel the gravitas he carries as a performer". The Hollywood Reporter and Teen Vogue respectively described it as reminiscent of Timberlake and Jackson.

Artists who have named Haechan as an influence include Drippin's Changuk, NCT Wish's Ryo, Xikers's Junmin, Nowz's Yoon, Younite's Eunho, and Whib's Wonjun, with some citing his performance style as a reason.

== Other ventures ==
=== Endorsements ===
Haechan became the brand model for the South Korean cosmetics company Naming in October 2025. In July 2026, the Indonesian coffeehouse chain Kopi Kenangan appointed him as its brand ambassador to target a "digitally connected younger generation" amid the brand's international expansion. After Haechan featured a perfume by the Indonesian brand Mykonos on Instagram in September 2026, causing it to sell out, the brand collaborated with him two months later to launch a new fragrance. Haechan has also appeared in fashion magazines wearing Louis Vuitton and Yves Saint Laurent, as well as promoting Dior Beauty.

=== Philanthropy ===
In February 2023, Haechan donated ₩100 million to the Community Chest of Korea to help victims of the earthquake that struck Turkey and Syria that month. In August 2023, he donated ₩50 million to the Korean Red Cross to support victims and emergency services affected by the wildfires that broke out that month on the island of Maui, Hawaii. In March 2025, Haechan donated ₩50 million to the Community Chest of Korea to help residents of the Yeongnam region affected by the wildfires that broke out that month.

== Personal life ==
In November 2022, a sasaeng fan trespassed into Haechan's family home, leading to a prosecution indictment that was ultimately resolved with leniency at Haechan's request, to spare the fan from criminal punishment.

== Discography ==
=== Studio albums ===
List of studio albums, with selected details, chart positions, sales figures, and certifications
Title	Details	Peak chart positions			Sales	Certifications
Title	Details	KOR	JPN	JPN Hot	Sales	Certifications
Taste	Released: September 8, 2025; Labels: SM, Kakao; Formats: CD, digital download, LP, streaming	1	4	24	KOR: 434,611; JPN: 22,658	KMCA: Platinum

=== Singles ===
==== As lead artist ====
List of singles as lead artist, with year of release, selected chart positions, and associated album
Title	Year	Peak chart positions	Album
Title	Year	KOR	Album
"Crzy"	2025	11	Taste

==== As featured artist ====
List of singles as featured artist, with year of release, selected chart positions, and associated album
Title	Year	Peak chart positions	Album
Title	Year	KOR	Album
"+82 Pressin'" (Mark featuring Haechan)	2025	144	The Firstfruit

=== Promotional singles ===
List of promotional singles, with year of release, selected chart positions, and associated album
Title	Year	Peak chart positions	Album
Title	Year	KOR	Album
"Good Person (2022)" (좋은 사람)	2022	115	Non-album single
"A Thousand Reasons" (니가 좋은 이유)	2025	— (Note: "A Thousand Reasons" did not enter the Circle Digital Chart but peaked at position 27 on the component Download Chart.)	Second Shot at Love
"Bitter Sweet (Addiction)" (with Taeyong)	2026	— (Note: "Bitter Sweet (Addiction)" did not enter the Circle Digital Chart but peaked at position 81 on the component Download Chart.)	Non-album single
"—" denotes a recording that did not chart or was not released in that territory.

=== Other charted songs ===
List of other charted songs, with year of release, selected chart positions, and associated album
Title	Year	Peak chart positions	Album
Title	Year	KOR DL	Album
"Snow Dream 2021" (with Yeri, Chenle, Jisung, and Ningning)	2021	83	2021 Winter SM Town: SMCU Express
"Camera Lights"	2025	45	Taste
"Adrenaline"	2025	47	Taste
"Love Beyond"	2025	53	Taste
"Roll with Me"	2025	49	Taste
"Intermission"	2025	65	Taste
"Talented"	2025	59	Taste
"WYN?" (with Haon)	2025	51	Taste
"Should Be"	2025	52	Taste
"Grey Rain"	2025	57	Taste
"Outro (Back in the Studio)"	2025	80	Taste

=== Writing credits ===
Key
Indicates songs in which writers are credited specifically for the Korean lyrics

List of songs by name, with credited artist(s), lyricist(s), composer(s), associated album, and year of release
Title	Artist(s)	Lyricist(s)	Composer(s)	Album	Year	Ref.
"Best of Me"	NCT Dream	Haechan	Matthew Crawford; Aaron Theodore Berton; Taylor Ryan Dolletzki; Jacob Connor Plough	Dreamscape	2024	
"Flying Kiss"	NCT Dream	Haechan	Ronny Svendsen; Adrian Thesen; Henrik Heaven; Louise Lindberg	Dreamscape	2024	
"Like We Just Met"	NCT Dream	Mark; Renjun; Jeno; Haechan; Jaemin; Chenle; Jisung	Allegro; Dan Johnson; Robbie Jay; Mark; Jeno; Jaemin	ISTJ	2023	
"N.Y.C.T"	NCT U	Taeil; Haechan	Deez; Yunsu; Taeil; Haechan	Non-album single	2023	
"Should Be"	Haechan	Deez; Vxion; Haechan	Deez; Frzm	Taste	2025	
"Smile for U"	NCT Dream	Haechan; Kelbyul	Kyle Reynolds; Faangs; Kella Armitage; Rob Nelson	Dream After Dream	2026	

=== Music videos ===
List of music videos, with year of release, other credited performer(s), director, and description
Title	Year	Other performer(s)	Director	Description	Ref.
"+82 Pressin'"	2025	Mark	Park Cheol-ho	Influenced by the 2005 film Sin City, it adopts a graphic novel aesthetic to show Haechan and Mark reintroducing color to a gray version of Seoul.	
"Taste of Sun"	2025	—N/a	Littletempo	It features snippets of tracks from Taste and shows Haechan navigating a series of strange, uncontrollable events, eventually discovering the existence of his "inner god", depicted as a solar deity, and ultimately merging with him.	
"Taste of Light"	2025	—N/a	Park Cheol-ho	It features snippets of five tracks from Taste and shows Haechan's journey from being a trainee guided by a stage light to becoming the light itself.	
"Crzy"	2025	—N/a	Christian Haahs	It shows Haechan's pursuit of a stranger after a chance encounter at an art museum, along with various dance sequences.	

== Live performances ==
=== Fan meetings ===
List of fan meetings, with dates and locations
Title	Date	Venue	City	Country	Ref.
Taste	October 8, 2025	Zepp Osaka Bayside	Osaka	Japan	
Taste	October 10, 2025	Zepp Haneda	Tokyo	Japan	
Taste	October 11, 2025	Comtec Corporation Portbase	Nagoya	Japan	

=== Festivals ===
List of festival performances, with date, name of the event, location, and performed song(s)
Date	Event	Venue	City	Country	Performed song(s)	Ref.
April 13, 2025	SBS Inkigayo Unicon	Tokyo Dome	Tokyo	Japan	"+82 Pressin'" (with Mark)	
August 1, 2025	KCON	Crypto.com Arena	Los Angeles	United States	"+82 Pressin'" (with Mark)	
May 23, 2026	Seoul Jazz Festival	KSPO Dome	Seoul	South Korea	"Camera Lights"; "Crzy"; "Thinking Out Loud"; "Love Never Felt So Good"; "Roll with Me"; "Talented"; "Love Beyond"; "Pado" (with Taeyong)	
June 27, 2026	Busan One Asia Festival	Busan Asiad Main Stadium	Busan	South Korea	"Crzy"; "Love Beyond" (Note: Incomplete set list)	

=== Television shows and specials ===
List of television performances, with date, name of the program, location, and performed song(s)
Date	Television program	Country	Performed song(s)	Ref.
March 20, 2025	M Countdown	South Korea	"+82 Pressin'" (with Mark)	
September 11, 2025	M Countdown	South Korea	"Crzy"	
September 12, 2025	Music Bank	South Korea	"Crzy"	
September 13, 2025	Show! Music Core	South Korea	"Crzy"	
September 14, 2025	Inkigayo	South Korea	"Crzy"	
September 18, 2025	M Countdown	South Korea	"Crzy"	
September 19, 2025	Music Bank	South Korea	"Crzy"	
September 20, 2025	Show! Music Core	South Korea	"Crzy"	
September 21, 2025	Inkigayo	South Korea	"Crzy"	
December 19, 2025	KBS Song Festival	South Korea	"Crzy"; "Talented"	
August 25, 2026	LeeMujin Service	South Korea	"127 Million Miles"; "The Lady"; "I Need a Girl"; "Playboy" (with Lee Mu-jin)	

=== Other performances ===
List of other performances, with date, name of the event, location, and performed song(s)
Date	Event	Venue	City	Country	Performed song(s)	Ref.
August 9, 2025	SM Town Live 2025: The Culture, the Future	Tokyo Dome	Tokyo	Japan	"+82 Pressin'" (with Mark)	
August 10, 2025	SM Town Live 2025: The Culture, the Future	Tokyo Dome	Tokyo	Japan	"+82 Pressin'" (with Mark)	

== Accolades ==
=== Awards and nominations ===
List of awards and nominations, with name of the award, year of ceremony, recipient, category, and result of the nomination
Award	Year	Recipient	Category	Result	Ref.
Hanteo Music Awards	2026	Haechan	Best Continent Artist – Africa	Nominated	
Hanteo Music Awards	2026	Haechan	Best Continent Artist – Asia	Nominated	
Hanteo Music Awards	2026	Haechan	Best Continent Artist – Europe	Nominated	
Hanteo Music Awards	2026	Haechan	Best Continent Artist – North America	Nominated	
Hanteo Music Awards	2026	Haechan	Best Continent Artist – Oceania	Nominated	
Hanteo Music Awards	2026	Haechan	Best Continent Artist – South America	Nominated	
Hanteo Music Awards	2026	Haechan	Best Global Popular Artist	Nominated	
Hanteo Music Awards	2026	Haechan	Best Popular Artist	Nominated	
Korea First Brand Awards	2026	Haechan	Male Solo Singer – Vietnam	Won	
Korea Grand Music Awards	2025	Taste	Best Music 10	Nominated	
Korea Grand Music Awards	2025	Haechan	Fan Favorite Artist – Male	Nominated	
Korea Grand Music Awards	2025	Haechan	Trend of the Year – K-pop Solo	Nominated	
Melon Music Awards	2025	Taste	Millions Top 10	Nominated	
Music Awards Japan	2026	Haechan	Best K-pop Artist	Longlisted	
Seoul International Drama Awards	2026	"A Thousand Reasons"	Outstanding Korean Drama OST	Nominated	
Seoul Music Awards	2026	Haechan	K-pop World Choice – Solo	Nominated	
Seoul Music Awards	2026	"A Thousand Reasons"	Original Soundtrack Award	Nominated	

=== Listicles ===
List of listicle placements, with name of the publisher, year of listing, name of the listicle, and placement
Publisher	Year	Listicle	Placement	Ref.
Billboard	2024	K-Pop Artist 100	85th	
Billboard	2025	K-Pop Artist 100	75th	
