= Riize discography =

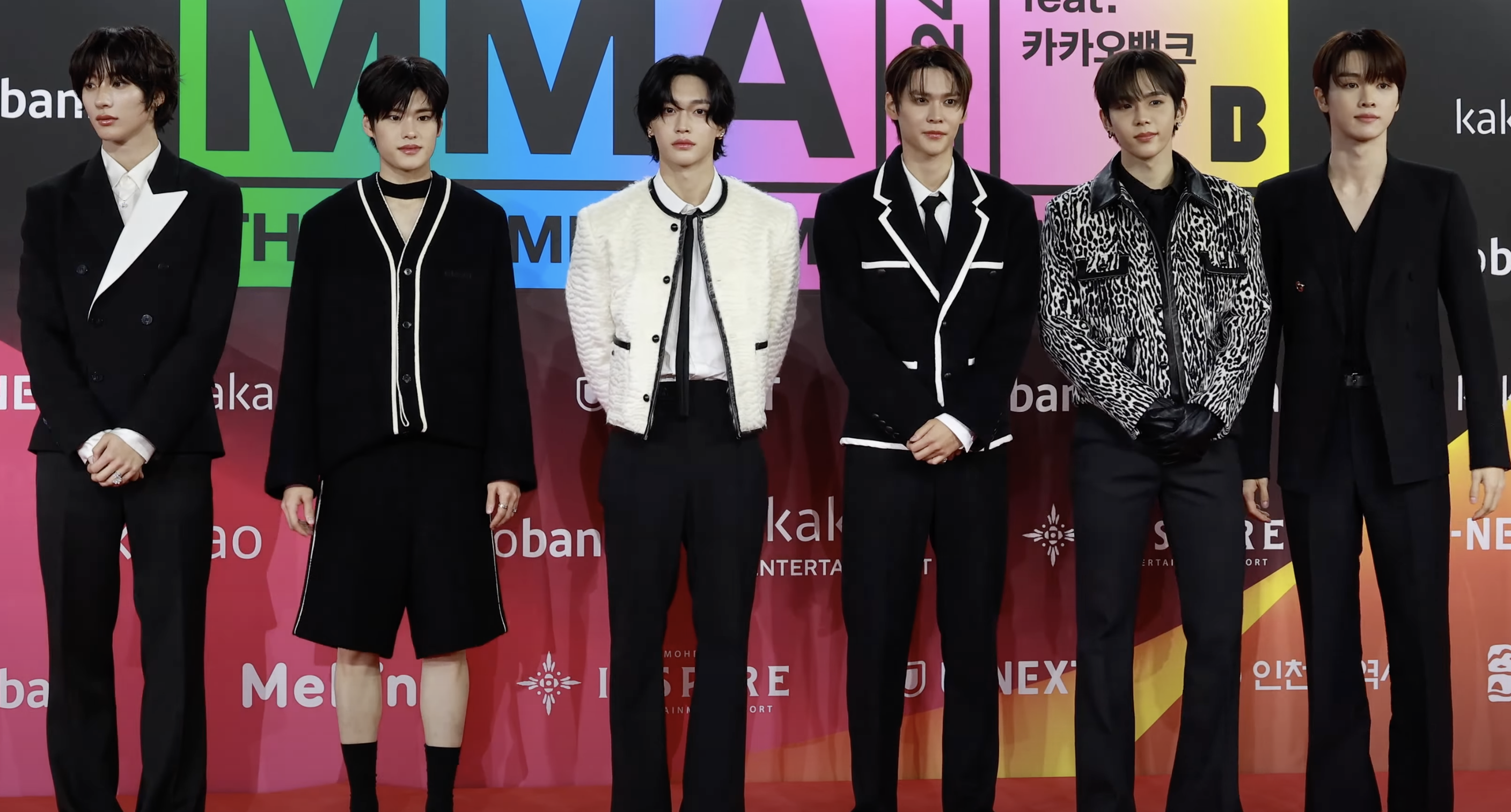
- Riize at the red carpet of 2024 Melon Music Awards
- Studio albums: 1
- EPs: 2
- Singles: 17
- Reissues: 1
- Single albums: 2
- Soundtrack appearances: 5

South Korean boy group Riize has released one studio album, two extended play, one reissue, two single album, seventeen singles, one promotional single, and five soundtracks.

The group made their debut in 2023 under SM Entertainment with the single album Get a Guitar, which sold approximately 1 million copies in South Korea and received a million certification in South Korea. The group's Japanese debut single, "Lucky", released in 2024 under Universal Japan, peaked at number one on the Oricon Singles Chart and received a platinum certification in Japan, with approximately 322,000 copies sold.

== Studio albums ==
List of studio albums, showing selected details, chart positions, sales figures, and certifications
Title	Details	Peak chart positions					Sales	Certifications
Title	Details	KOR	JPN	JPN Hot	US Sales	US World	Sales	Certifications
Odyssey	Released: May 19, 2025; Label: SM, Kakao, RCA; Formats: CD, digital download, streaming	1	2	3	9	4	KOR: 1,931,200; JPN: 156,105	KMCA: Million; KMCA: Platinum (SMC); RIAJ: Gold (phy.)
Emotiion	Released: Spring 2027; Label: SM, Kakao, RCA; Formats: CD, digital download, streaming	TBA						

=== Reissues ===
List of reissues, showing selected details, selected chart positions, sales figures, and certifications
Title	Details	Peak chart positions		Sales	Certifications
Title	Details	KOR	JPN	Sales	Certifications
Riizing: Epilogue	Released: September 4, 2024; Labels: SM, Kakao, RCA; Formats: CD, digital download, streaming	1	2	KOR: 345,196; JPN: 30,159	KMCA: Platinum

== Extended plays ==
List of EPs, showing selected details, selected chart positions, and sales figures
Title	Details	Peak chart positions					Sales	Certifications
Title	Details	KOR	JPN	JPN Hot	US Sales	US World	Sales	Certifications
Riizing	Released: June 17, 2024; Labels: SM, Kakao, RCA; Formats: CD, digital download, streaming	2	1	1	11	5	KOR: 1,344,986; JPN: 64,074	KMCA: Million
II	Released: June 15, 2026; Labels: SM, Kakao, RCA; Formats: CD, digital download, streaming	1	1	2	39	16	KOR: 1,357,383; JPN: 45,818	KMCA: Million; KMCA: Platinum (SMC)

== Single albums ==
List of single albums, showing selected details, selected chart positions, sales figures and certifications
Title	Details	Peak chart positions		Sales	Certifications
Title	Details	KOR	JPN	Sales	Certifications
Get a Guitar	Released: September 4, 2023; Labels: SM, RCA; Formats: CD, digital download, streaming	1	2	KOR: 1,069,611; JPN: 61,197	KMCA: Million
Fame	Released: November 24, 2025; Labels: SM, Kakao, RCA; Formats: CD, digital download, streaming	1	5 (Note: Fame charted on the Oricon Singles Chart.)	KOR: 707,260; JPN: 20,509 (phy.)	KMCA: Platinum

== Singles ==
=== Korean singles ===
List of Korean singles, showing year released, selected chart positions, certifications and album name
Title	Year	Peak chart positions							Sales	Certifications	Album
Title	Year	KOR	JPN Comb.	JPN Hot	NLD Glo.	NZ Hot	UK Dig.	WW Excl. US	Sales	Certifications	Album
"Memories"	2023	99	—	— (Note: "Memories" did not enter the Billboard Japan Hot 100, but peaked at number 69 on the Download Songs.)	38	—	—	—			Get a Guitar
"Get a Guitar"	2023	11	— (Note: "Get a Guitar" did not enter the Oricon Combined Singles Chart, but peaked at number 46 on the Digital Singles Chart.)	98	—	—	—	—		RIAJ: Gold (st.)	Get a Guitar
"Talk Saxy"	2023	68	—	— (Note: "Talk Saxy" did not enter the Billboard Japan Hot 100, but peaked at number 69 on the Download Songs.)	—	—	—	—			Riizing
"Love 119"	2024	5	—	74	—	20	—	127			Riizing
"Siren"	2024	21	— (Note: "Siren" did not enter the Oricon Combined Singles Chart, but peaked at number 43 on the Digital Singles Chart.)	— (Note: "Siren" did not enter the Billboard Japan Hot 100, but peaked at number 44 on the Download Songs.)	—	—	—	—	JPN: 1,392 (dig.)		Riizing
"Impossible"	2024	26	33	66	—	—	—	135	JPN: 1,632 (dig.)		Riizing
"Boom Boom Bass"	2024	17	40	41	—	—	76	87	JPN: 1,275 (dig.)		Riizing
"Combo"	2024	200	—	—	—	—	—	—			Riizing: Epilogue
"Fly Up"	2025	8	—	85	—	—	99	—			Odyssey
"Fame"	2025	54	9	— (Note: "Fame" did not enter the Billboard Japan Hot 100, but peaked at number 36 on the Download Songs.)	—	—	—	—	JPN: 1,007 (dig.)		Fame
"Do Your Dance"	2026	18	—	— (Note: "Do Your Dance" did not enter the Billboard Japan Hot 100, but peaked at number ten on the Hot Shot Songs.)	—	—	—	—			II
"Insomnia"	2026	31	41	30	—	—	—	—			Emotiion
"Lowkey" (with Plave)	2026	TBA									Non-album singles
"—" denotes a recording that did not chart or was not released in that territory

=== Japanese singles ===
List of Japanese singles, showing year released, selected chart positions, sales, certifications and album name
Title	Year	Peak chart positions				Sales	Certifications	Album
Title	Year	KOR DL	JPN	JPN Comb.	JPN Hot	Sales	Certifications	Album
"Love 119" (Japanese version)	2024	189	—	— (Note: "Love 119" (Japanese version) did not enter the Oricon Combined Singles Chart, but peaked at number 35 on the Digital Singles Chart.)	52	JPN: 1,482 (dig.)		Non-album singles
"Lucky"	2024	67	1	1	2	JPN: 322,872 (phy.); JPN: 1,200 (dig.)	RIAJ: Platinum (phy.)	Non-album singles
"All of You"	2026	88	2	3	3	JPN: 354,147 (phy.)	RIAJ: 2× Platinum (phy.)	Non-album singles
"Sunburst"	2026	51	2	2	2	JPN: 251,099 (phy.)	RIAJ: Platinum (phy.)	Non-album singles
"—" denotes a recording that did not chart or was not released in that territory

=== Promotional singles ===
List of promotional singles, showing year released, selected chart positions and album name
Title	Year	Peak chart positions	Album
Title	Year	KOR	Album
"Hug"	2025	41	2025 SM Town: The Culture, the Future

== Soundtrack appearances ==
List of soundtrack appearances, showing year released, selected chart positions and album name
Title	Year	Peak chart positions		Album
Title	Year	KOR DL	JPN Hot	Album
"Happy! Happy! Happy!"	2023	—	—	Sealook OST
"Look at Me Sealook"	2023	—	—	Sealook OST
"Same Key"	2024	166	— (Note: "Same Key" did not enter the Billboard Japan Hot 100, but peaked at number 95 on the Download Songs.)	Makeup with Mud OST
"Kill Shot"	2026	100	34	Kill Blue OST
"Behind the Shine"	2026	28	—	Perfect Crown OST

== Other charted songs ==
List of other charted songs
Title	Year	Peak chart positions			Sales	Album
Title	Year	KOR	JPN Dig.	JPN Hot	Sales	Album
"9 Days"	2024	164	—	—	—N/a	Riizing
"Honestly"	2024	146	—	—	—N/a	Riizing
"One Kiss"	2024	130	—	—	—N/a	Riizing
"Be My Next"	2024	— (Note: "Be My Next" did not enter the Circle Digital Chart, but debuted and peaked at position 107 on the component Download Chart.)	—	—	—N/a	Lucky
"Odyssey"	2025	81	—	—	—N/a	Odyssey
"Bag Bad Back"	2025	44	—	—	—N/a	Odyssey
"Ember to Solar" (잉걸)	2025	71	—	—	—N/a	Odyssey
"Show Me Love"	2025	90	—	—	—N/a	Odyssey
"Passage"	2025	111	—	—	—N/a	Odyssey
"Midnight Mirage"	2025	91	—	—	—N/a	Odyssey
"The End of the Day" (모든 하루의 끝)	2025	82	—	—	—N/a	Odyssey
"Inside My Love"	2025	98	—	—	—N/a	Odyssey
"Another Life"	2025	108	—	—	—N/a	Odyssey
"Something's in the Water"	2025	111	47	42	JPN: 802 (dig.)	Fame
"Sticky Like"	2025	105	48	—	JPN: 801 (dig.)	Fame
"Flashlight"	2026	— (Note: "Flashlight" did not enter the Circle Digital Chart, but debuted and peaked at position 53 on the component Download Chart.)	—	—	—N/a	All of You
"Soar"	2026	101	—	—	—N/a	II
"D-D-Done"	2026	116	—	—	—N/a	II
"Overdrive"	2026	131	—	—	—N/a	II
"Like a Bomb"	2026	135	—	—	—N/a	II
"In a Loop"	2026	134	—	—	—N/a	II
"Rise Over"	2026	— (Note: "Rise Over" did not enter the Circle Digital Chart, but debuted and peaked at position 53 on the component Download Chart.)	—	—	—N/a	Sunburst
"—" denotes a recording that did not chart or was not released in that territory
