= Shotaro (rapper) =

Japanese rapper (born 2000)

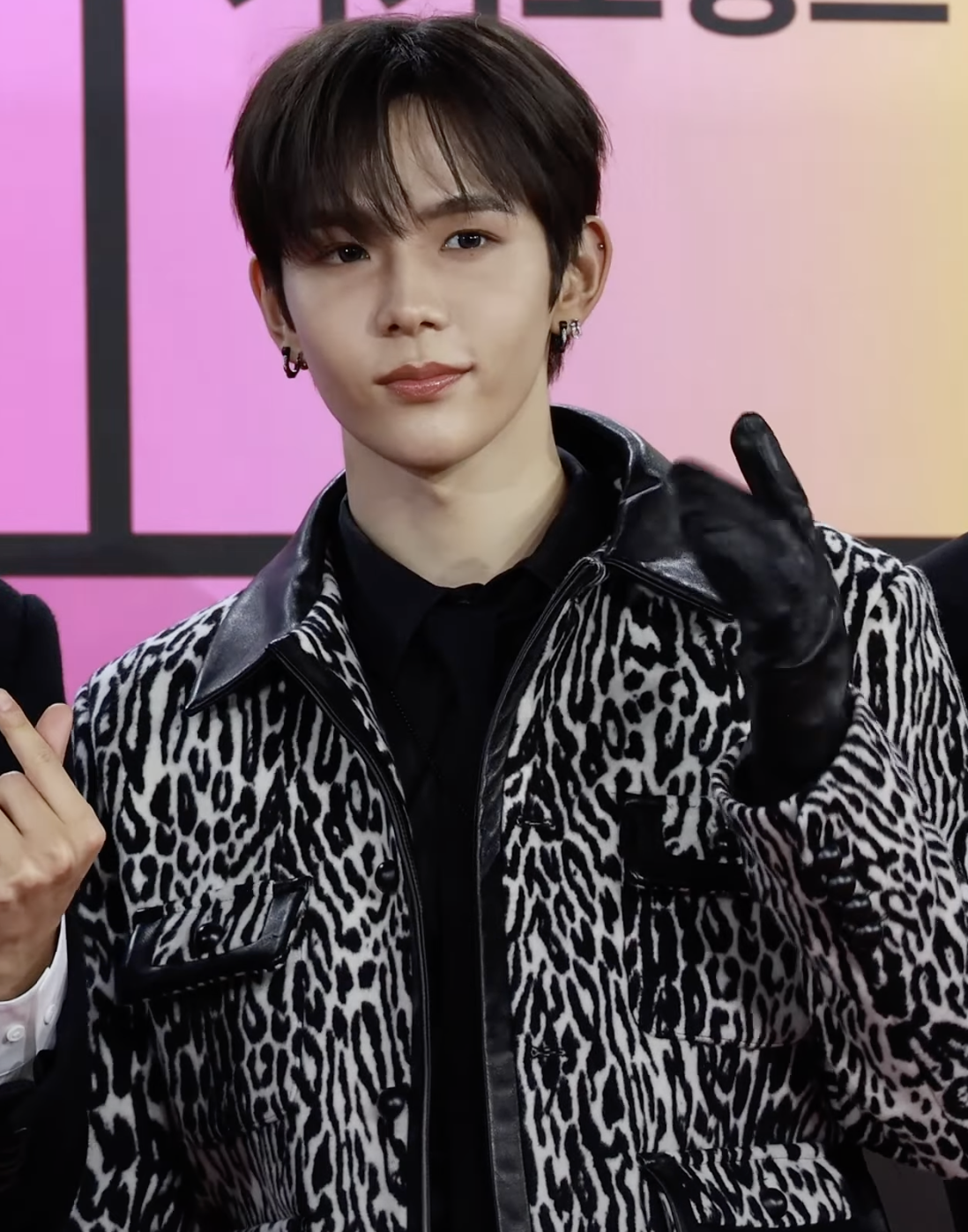
- Shotaro in 2024
- Born: Osaki Shotaro; November 25, 2000 (age 25); Kanagawa Prefecture, Japan
- Occupations: Rapper; dancer
- Years active: 2020–present
- Musical career
- Genre: K-pop
- Label: SM
- Member of: Riize; SM Town
- Formerly of: NCT

Japanese name
- Kanji: 大﨑 将太郎
- Hiragana: おおさき しょうたろう
- Romanization: Ōsaki Shōtarō

Signature
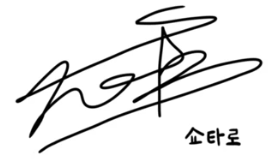

Osaki Shotaro (Japanese: 大﨑 将太郎; born November 25, 2000), known mononymously as Shotaro (Korean: 쇼타로, Japanese: ショウタロウ), is a Japanese rapper and dancer based in South Korea. Shotaro first came to public attention in 2020 when he joined NCT, a South Korean boy band managed by SM Entertainment. After departing NCT in 2023, he later debuted as a member of another SM boy band, Riize.

== Early life ==
Osaki Shotaro was born on November 25, 2000 in Kanagawa Prefecture, Japan, and was raised in the city of Zama. He began dancing at the age of five, after being inspired by his mother, who is also a dancer.

After deciding in middle school to pursue dance professionally, Shotaro trained at LDH's EXPG Studio in Tokyo. During this time, he appeared as an extra in advertisements for brands such as Pocari Sweat. He also performed a backup dancer for artists such as Japanese boy band Exile and singer-songwriter Gackt. Shotaro knew he wanted to become an idol after seeing NCT in concert. Prior to joining SM Entertainment, Shotaro operated a TikTok account and had posted videos dancing to NCT's songs.

== Career ==
=== 2020–2023: Debut in NCT and departure ===
After being spotted on social media by a SM Entertainment talent scout in 2019, Shotaro moved to South Korea in 2020 and began training with the company.

Shotaro joined South Korean boy band NCT in 2020, after being revealed as a surprise new member, along with Sungchan, becoming the 22nd and 23rd members of the band. The news was released in conjunction with announcement the band's second album, NCT 2020 Resonance Pt. 1, on September 20, with further information revealed the next day. The album was released on October 12. Shotaro participated in the album's lead single, "Make A Wish (Birthday Song)", as a member of NCT U. At the 2020 KBS Song Festival, Shotaro performed a cover of Got7's "Hard Carry" alongside Hyunjin, Moonbin, and Juyeon.

In 2021, Shotaro received a pictorial in the August issue of Vogue Korea, becoming his first solo magazine photoshoot, modelling brands such as Dior, Alexander McQueen, and Swarovski.

Aside from his activities as a member of NCT, Shotaro participated in the SM Town Live 2022: SMCU Express concert tour throughout August 2022, performing "Outro: Dream Routine" with fellow NCT member Sungchan, and SM Rookies members Seunghan, Eunseok and Shohei.

He also starred in Welcome to NCT Universe, a variety show showing Shotaro and Sungchan guiding SM Rookies Seunghan, Eunseok and Shohei through "everything about NCT". The ten-episode series aired from November 2022 to February 2023 on TVING in South Korea, and Nippon TV and Hulu in Japan.

=== 2023–present: Move to Riize ===
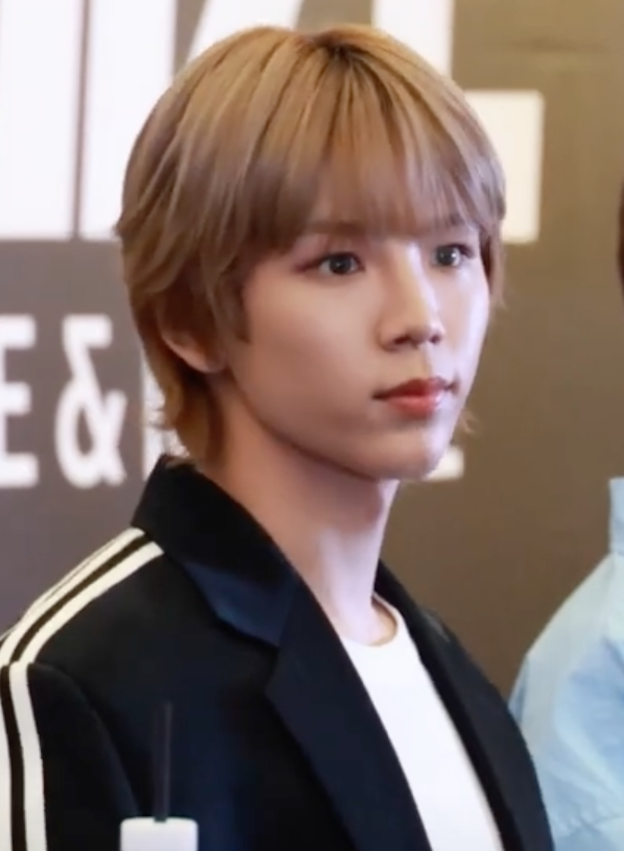
Shotaro in 2023

Though he was originally believed to become a member of NCT's new Japan-based subunit, Shotaro never joined a fixed NCT sub-unit. On May 24, 2023, the band's agency announced that Shotaro, along with fellow member Sungchan, would be leaving NCT. In the statement, the agency said that the duo would be "closing their chapter with NCT", while indicating that both would be joining a new boy band, set to debut in late 2023. Shotaro and Sungchan was among three members to depart the band that month, with Lucas also departing the band weeks earlier.

That July, The Chosun Ilbo reported that the new boy band was preparing for debut and were filming a music video in Los Angeles. This was later confirmed by SM. Shotaro was officially introduced as a member of Riize on August 1, and made his first appearance with the group in a performance video for "Siren" on August 7. The group made their official debut on September 4 with the single album Get a Guitar, which sold more than a million copies in its first week, becoming the second-highest-selling debut album by a band.

In December 2024, Shotaro was named "Artist of the Month" by Mnet's Studio Choom, a special series highlighting artists considered to have exceptional dance skills. As part of the selection, Shotaro released a dance performance to Kanye West's "Clique".

== Endorsements ==
In 2022, Shotaro was named the face of MAC Cosmetics Japan. The partnership included Shotaro participating in "MACxShotaro" campaign, presenting the brand's tinted primers and foundation. Shotaro also became a brand model for South Korean skincare brand Round A'Round, presenting the brand's cleaning foam line.

== Filmography ==
=== Television shows ===
Television shows appearances
Year	Title	Role	Notes	Ref.
2022–2023	Welcome to NCT Universe	Himself	Ten episodes	
