= NCT 2020 Resonance =

- Digital cover for Pt. 1

Studio album by NCT
- Released: October 12, 2020 (Pt. 1); November 23, 2020 (Pt. 2)
- Recorded: 2020
- Studios: SM Studios, Seoul
- Genres: Hip hop; R&B
- Length: 46:47 (Pt. 1); 69:33 (Pt. 2)
- Languages: Korean; English; Mandarin; Japanese
- Label: SM
- Producers: Kenzie; The Stereotypes; Sonny J Mason; Harvey Mason Jr.; Simon Petrén; Moonshine; Mike Daley; Mitchell Owens; minGtion; Emile Ghantous; Jia Lih; Chung Yoon Jang; Royal Dive; David Wilson; Douglas Paul Martung; Dwilly; The Wavys; IMLAY; Zayson; Kim Boo-min; Hitchhiker; Dwayne "Dem Jointz" Abernathy Jr.; Ryan S. Jhun; Keith Hetrick; Steve Daly; Alex Tanas; Mark "Pelli" Pellizzer

NCT chronology
Awaken the World (2020)	NCT 2020 Resonance (2020)	Loveholic (2021)

NCT studio albums chronology
NCT 2018 Empathy (2018)	NCT 2020 Resonance (2020)	Universe (2021)

Digital cover for Pt. 2
- Digital cover

Singles from NCT 2020 Resonance
- 1. "Make A Wish (Birthday Song)" Released: October 12, 2020; 2. "From Home" Released: October 19, 2020; 3. "90's Love" Released: November 23, 2020; 4. "Work It" Released: November 27, 2020

NCT 2020 Resonance is the second studio album by South Korean boy band NCT, an unlimited group project under the management of SM Entertainment. Similar to their previous release NCT 2018 Empathy, NCT 2020 Resonance is part of the "NCT 2020" project, which saw all current NCT members from several units collaborating on a full-length release. This time, the album features all 23 members from three current units of NCT; NCT 127, NCT Dream, and WayV, while introducing two new NCT members, namely Shotaro and Sungchan. It would also be the final NCT album to feature Lucas due to his hiatus and eventual departure in 2023. The first part was released on October 12, 2020, and the second part was then released on November 23, 2020.

To promote the first part of the album, "Make A Wish" and "From Home" were released respectively as the first and second single, under the name of NCT U. "90's Love" and "Work It" were released as the two lead singles for the second part of the album.

The group promoted the album through music show performances and their own reality television series, NCT World 2.0. It was a commercial success for the group, becoming their first chart-topper on the Gaon Album Chart as NCT, and subsequently the group's first release to sell over a million copies without any repackage.

== Background and release ==
On September 15, 2020, it was announced that all current members of NCT would finally reunite as NCT 2020 following their first studio album, NCT 2018 Empathy, in 2018. A teaser video, titled "Interlude: Resonance," was released on September 20. The album's name, Resonance, was announced a day later, with the album to be released in two parts: the first would be released on October 12 while the second part would receive a November release in the same year. NCT groups NCT 127, NCT Dream, and WayV were confirmed to be part of Resonance, with WayV's Xiaojun, Hendery, and Yangyang officially being inducted in NCT through the project. Two new NCT members, Sungchan and Shotaro, would debut with Part 1's release, bringing the total number of members to 23. Pre-orders for the album began on September 21. Another teaser video, named "Year Party," was released the next day, which featured all members assembling. On September 23, the 23 members gathered in a V Live broadcast where Sungchan and Shotaro were officially introduced to the public.

Following the album's release schedule, a short music video for NCT Dream's "Déjà Vu" was released on October 8, 2020, through the group's YouTube channel, with the music video for NCT U's "Misfit" released a day later. Along with its parental album, the music video for "Make a Wish (Birthday Song)" was then released on October 12, 2020, while the music video for "From Home" was released on October 19. The physical album comes in two versions: Past and Future, with different packages for the Korean and international editions.

On November 9, SM Entertainment confirmed that the second part of the album would be released on November 23, 2020. Previously, during the announcement for Resonance Pt. 1, the company stated that the NCT 2020 Project would consist of two parts.

== Recording and production ==
Member Doyoung revealed that producers would be in charge of selecting songs and which members would be recording them. Recording sessions took more than a month to conduct. Compared to Empathy, Taeyong is not the leader of the collective NCT 2020, saying, "I'm not actually the lead of NCT right now because the 22 other members are very awesome and these guys don't need a lead. So I'm not the leader of NCT. I just say, 'Hi, guys' and 'Hana dul set... [1, 2, 3...]' to start our greeting." Taeyong explained that Resonance marks as a progression of Empathy, explaining, "Our music is so different too, because now we are in the pandemic, and our lyrics mean we can overcome this right now, and we’re more confident and powerful. We are definitely more grown-up." He also described the various genres and styles the album featured, saying, "If you listen to our album, you’ll notice that obviously we have a more traditional kind of ballad, but we also have other tracks that are more old school and have that retro vibe."

The NCT U unit for "Make A Wish (Birthday Song)" consisted of Taeyong, Doyoung, Jaehyun, Lucas, Xiaojun, Jaemin, and Shotaro. The hip-hop dance track "Make A Wish (Birthday Song)" was co-written by rappers Penomeco and Damian, while music was composed by Sonny J Mason, Karen Poole, and Bobii Lewis. Korean and English versions of the song were included in the album, with Jaehyun explaining that these were recorded with international audiences in mind. Doyoung shared that the song "aims to give listeners a positive vibe and deliver positive energy," with the song's title and lyrics being a spin on making birthday wishes.

The sub-units of NCT each released a song for the album: "Déjà Vu" for NCT Dream, which served as Mark's return to the Dream unit; "Nectar" for WayV; and "Music, Dance" for NCT 127. Doyoung described "Music, Dance" as "energetic," saying, "I just remember having a lot of fun recording it, but we also trying to deliver the same energy when I recorded it. I remember kind of sweating it out actually in the studio." "Déjà Vu" is about the original seven Dream members reuniting, with Jaemin sharing, "The theme of the song was, 'Let’s go back on stage together.' It was great to be reunited again as seven and to be able to showcase that reunion on Resonance Pt. 1." Lucas and Xiaojun described WayV's song, "Nectar," as "sexy." Describing the recording process, Xiaojun explained that they "wanted to use that feeling — like bad boys with this very special juice." Instrumental "Interlude: Past to Present" was a favorite of some members, with Taeyong elaborating, "It explains NCT and kind of introduces the group within the music." The group that performed "From Home" included Taeil, Kun, Yuta, Doyoung, Renjun, Haechan and Chenle, and was performed in four languages - Korean, English, Mandarin Chinese and Japanese.

The lead single of part 2, "90's Love", is a new retro hip hop R&B song featuring Ten, Winwin, Mark, Jeno, Haechan, Yangyang, and Sungchan; its lyrics are about creating new and unique values. "Work It" is an electronic dance song recorded by Johnny, Yuta, Ten, Jungwoo, Hendery, Jaemin, and Jisung while "Raise The Roof", sung by Taeil, Yuta, Johnny, Kun, Jungwoo, Hendery, Renjun, Chenle, and Jisung, is a hip hop track that uses oriental instrumentations. "My Everything" contains a minimalist composition that features the vocals of Taeil, Xiaojun, and Renjun on a calm piano melody. "All About You", sung by Jaehyun, Jungwoo, Mark, Hendery, Shotaro, Sungchan, and Chenle, is a medium-tempo pop song that utilizes retro and modern bass sounds while "I.O.U" is a lo-fi hip hop track recorded by Taeyong, Kun, Doyoung, Yangyang, Shotaro, Chenle, Jisung. Two additional instrumental tracks are included: "Interlude: Present to Future" and "Outro: Dream Routine".

== Accolades ==
Part 1 won Album Bonsang at the 35th Golden Disc Awards. "Make a Wish (Birthday Song)" was named one of the best K-pop songs of 2020 by Dazed (13) and BuzzFeed (26). Paper included "From Home" in their list of The 40 Best K-pop Songs of 2020 at number 15.

Awards and nominations for NCT 2020 Resonance
Organization	Year	Award	Nominee	Result	Ref.
Gaon Chart Music Awards	2021	Album of the Year – 4th Quarter	Part 1	Nominated	
Gaon Chart Music Awards	2021	Album of the Year – 4th Quarter	Part 2	Nominated	
Golden Disc Awards	2021	Album Bonsang	Part 1	Won	
Golden Disc Awards	2021	Album Daesang	Part 1	Nominated	
Golden Disc Awards	2022	Album Bonsang	Part 2	Nominated	

Music program awards
Song	Program	Date	Ref.
"Make A Wish (Birthday Song)"	Show Champion	October 21, 2020	
"Make A Wish (Birthday Song)"	M Countdown	October 22, 2020	
"Make A Wish (Birthday Song)"	Music Bank	October 23, 2020	
"90's Love"	The Show	December 8, 2020	
"90's Love"	Music Bank	January 15, 2021	

== Track listing ==
NCT Resonance Pt. 1 track listing
No.	Title	Lyrics	Music	Arrangement	Length
1.	"Make a Wish (Birthday Song)" (NCT U – sung by Taeyong, Doyoung, Jaehyun, Lucas, Xiaojun, Jaemin and Shotaro)	Penomeco; Damian	Bobii Lewis; Karen Poole; Sonny J. Mason	Sonny J. Mason	3:49
2.	"Misfit" (NCT U – sung by Johnny, Taeyong, Mark, Hendery, Jeno, Yangyang and Sungchan)	Rick Bridges; Hwang Yoo-bin	Emile Ghantous; Keith Hetrick; Jordan Benjamin; Steve Daly; Alex Tanas; Mark Pellizzer; Victor Manzano	Emile Ghantous; Keith Hetrick; Steve Daly; Alex Tanas; Mark Pellizzer	3:36
3.	"Volcano" (NCT U – sung by Taeyong, Doyoung, Jaehyun, Winwin, Jungwoo, Lucas and Mark)	Jo Yoon-kyung	Mike Daley; Mitchell Owens; Nicole "Kole" Cohen; Adrian McKinnon	Mike Daley; Mitchell Owens	3:49
4.	"Light Bulb" (Korean: 백열등; RR: Baegyeoldeung; NCT U – sung by Taeyong, Kun, Doyoung and Sungchan)	Kenzie; Kim Dong-hyun	Kenzie; Jonathan Yip; Ray Romulus; Jeremy Reeves; Ray McCullough III; Kim Dong-hyun	Kenzie; The Stereotypes	3:59
5.	"Dancing in the Rain" (NCT U – sung by Taeil, Johnny, Yuta, Kun, Jaehyun, Jungwoo, Xiaojun and Chenle)	Ji Yu-ri; Jinli (Full8loom); Jaehyun	Simon Petrén; Andreas Öberg; Ninos Hanna	Simon Petrén	3:35
6.	"Interlude: Past to Present"		Jeon Byung-sun (Royal Dive) (Joombas); Hong Young-in (Royal Dive) (Joombas)	Royal Dive (Joombas)	1:11
7.	"Déjà Vu" (Korean: 무대로; Hanja: 舞代路; RR: Mudaero; lit. 'To the Stage'; NCT Dream)	Kim Min-ji	Jonathan Gusmark (Moonshine); Ludvig Evers (Moonshine); Cazzi Opeia (Sunshine); Bobii Lewis	Moonshine	3:28
8.	"Nectar" (Chinese: 月之迷; pinyin: Yuè Zhī Mí; lit. 'The Moon's Mystery'; WayV)	Lu Yi Qiu	David Wilson; Mike Daley; Douglas Paul Martung	David Wilson; Mike Daley; Douglas Paul Martung	3:19
9.	"Music, Dance" (NCT 127)	Kenzie	Kenzie; Mike Daley; Mitchell Owens; Adrian McKinnon	Mike Daley; Mitchell Owens	3:56
10.	"Faded in My Last Song" (Korean: 피아노; RR: Piano; lit. 'Piano'; NCT U – sung by Taeil, Johnny, Yuta, Ten, Lucas, Renjun, Haechan and Jisung)	Choi Ji-ae	Jack Brady; Jordan Roman; Britt Burton; Patrick "J. Que" Smith; Aaron Berton; Andrew Hey; Sam Ramirez; Harvey Mason Jr.	The Wavys; Harvey Mason Jr.	3:36
11.	"From Home" (NCT U – sung by Taeil, Yuta, Kun, Doyoung, Renjun, Haechan and Chenle)	minGtion (ADC Music); JUNNY; DeerJenny; Natsumi Kobayashi	minGtion (ADC Music); JUNNY	minGtion (ADC Music)	4:20
12.	"From Home" (Korean version; NCT U – sung by Taeil, Yuta, Kun, Doyoung, Renjun, Haechan and Chenle)	minGtion (ADC Music); JUNNY	minGtion (ADC Music); JUNNY	minGtion (ADC Music)	4:20
13.	"Make a Wish (Birthday Song)" (English version; NCT U – sung by Taeyong, Doyoung, Jaehyun, Lucas, Xiaojun, Jaemin and Shotaro)	Bobii Lewis; Karen Poole; Sonny J. Mason	Bobii Lewis; Karen Poole; Sonny J. Mason	Sonny J. Mason	3:49
Total length:					46:47

NCT Resonance Pt. 2 track listing
No.	Title	Lyrics	Music	Arrangement	Length
1.	"90's Love" (NCT U – sung by Ten, Winwin, Mark, Jeno, Haechan, Yangyang and Sungchan)	Kenzie	Jia Lih; Jeremy "Tay" Jasper; Jayden Henry; Adrian McKinnon; Jordain Johnson; Julien Maurice Moore; Timothy "Bos" Bullock; Hautboi Rich	Jia Lih	3:33
2.	"Misfit" (NCT U – sung by Johnny, Taeyong, Mark, Hendery, Jeno, Yangyang and Sungchan)	Rick Bridges; Hwang Yoo-bin	Emile Ghantous; Keith Hetrick; Jordan Benjamin; Steve Daly; Alex Tanas; Mark Pellizzer; Victor Manzano	Emile Ghantous; Keith Hetrick; Steve Daly; Alex Tanas; Mark Pellizzer	3:36
3.	"Raise the Roof" (NCT U – sung by Taeil, Johnny, Yuta, Kun, Jungwoo, Hendery, Renjun, Chenle and Jisung)	Kenzie; Jakob Dorof	Sonny J. Mason; Bobii Lewis; Karen Poole	Sonny J. Mason	3:12
4.	"Volcano" (NCT U – sung by Taeyong, Doyoung, Jaehyun, Winwin, Jungwoo, Lucas and Mark)	Jo Yoon-kyung	Mike Daley; Mitchell Owens; Nicole "Kole" Cohen; Adrian McKinnon	Mike Daley; Mitchell Owens	3:49
5.	"Light Bulb" (Korean: 백열등; RR: Baegyeoldeung; NCT U – sung by Taeyong, Kun, Doyoung and Sungchan)	Kenzie; Kim Dong-hyun	Kenzie; Jonathan Yip; Ray Romulus; Jeremy Reeves; Ray McCullough III; Kim Dong-hyun	Kenzie; The Stereotypes	3:59
6.	"Dancing in the Rain" (NCT U – sung by Taeil, Johnny, Yuta, Kun, Jaehyun, Jungwoo, Xiaojun and Chenle)	Ji Yu-ri; Jinli (Full8loom); Jaehyun	Simon Petrén; Andreas Öberg; Ninos Hanna	Simon Petrén	3:35
7.	"My Everything" (NCT U – sung by Taeil, Xiaojun, and Renjun)	Jisoo Park (Joombas)	Jisoo Park (Joombas); Chungyoon (Joombas)	Chungyoon (Joombas)	3:41
8.	"Interlude: Past to Present"		Jeon Byung-sun (Royal Dive) (Joombas); Hong Young-in (Royal Dive) (Joombas)	Royal Dive (Joombas)	1:11
9.	"Make a Wish (Birthday Song)" (NCT U – sung by Taeyong, Doyoung, Jaehyun, Lucas, Xiaojun, Jaemin and Shotaro)	Penomeco; Damian	Bobii Lewis; Karen Poole; Sonny J. Mason	Sonny J. Mason	3:49
10.	"Déjà Vu" (Korean: 무대로; Hanja: 舞代路; RR: Mudaero; lit. 'To the Stage'; NCT Dream)	Kim Min-ji	Jonathan Gusmark (Moonshine); Ludvig Evers (Moonshine); Cazzi Opeia (Sunshine); Bobii Lewis	Moonshine	3:28
11.	"Nectar" (Chinese: 月之迷; pinyin: Yuè Zhī Mí; lit. 'The Moon's Mystery'; WayV)	Lu Yi Qiu	David Wilson; Mike Daley; Douglas Paul Martung	David Wilson; Mike Daley; Douglas Paul Martung	3:19
12.	"Music, Dance" (NCT 127)	Kenzie	Kenzie; Mike Daley; Mitchell Owens; Adrian McKinnon	Mike Daley; Mitchell Owens	3:56
13.	"Faded in My Last Song" (Korean: 피아노; RR: Piano; lit. 'Piano'; NCT U – sung by Taeil, Johnny, Yuta, Ten, Lucas, Renjun, Haechan and Jisung)	Choi Ji-ae	Jack Brady; Jordan Roman; Britt Burton; Patrick "J. Que" Smith; Aaron Berton; Andrew Hey; Sam Ramirez; Harvey Mason Jr.	The Wavys; Harvey Mason Jr.	3:36
14.	"From Home" (NCT U – sung by Taeil, Yuta, Kun, Doyoung, Renjun, Haechan and Chenle)	minGtion (ADC Music); JUNNY; DeerJenny; Natsumi Kobayashi	minGtion (ADC Music); JUNNY	minGtion (ADC Music)	4:20
15.	"From Home" (Korean version; NCT U – sung by Taeil, Yuta, Kun, Doyoung, Renjun, Haechan and Chenle)	minGtion (ADC Music); JUNNY	minGtion (ADC Music); JUNNY	minGtion (ADC Music)	4:20
16.	"Make a Wish (Birthday Song)" (English version; NCT U – sung by Taeyong, Doyoung, Jaehyun, Lucas, Xiaojun, Jaemin and Shotaro)	Bobii Lewis; Karen Poole; Sonny J. Mason	Bobii Lewis; Karen Poole; Sonny J. Mason	Sonny J. Mason	3:49
17.	"Interlude: Present to Future"		IMLAY	IMLAY	1:21
18.	"Work It" (NCT U – sung by Johnny, Yuta, Ten, Jungwoo, Hendery, Jaemin and Jisung)	Kenzie	Kenzie; Mike Daley; Mitchell Owens; Wilbart "Vedo" McCoy III	Mike Daley; Mitchell Owens	2:55
19.	"All About You" (Korean: 단잠; RR: Danjam; lit. 'Sweet Sleep'; NCT U – sung by Jaehyun, Jungwoo, Mark, Hendery, Shotaro, Sungchan and Chenle)	Lim Ga-in	Zayson	Zayson	3:33
20.	"I.O.U" (NCT U – sung by Taeyong, Kun, Doyoung, Yangyang, Shotaro, Chenle and Jisung)	Kim Boo-min; Rick Bridges	Hitchhiker; Kim Boo-min; Charles "Chizzy" Stephens III; Christopher Newland	Hitchhiker	3:41
21.	"Outro: Dream Routine"		Kenzie; Dem Jointz; Keynon "KC" Moore (3Sixty)	Kenzie; Dem Jointz; Ryan S. Jhun	0:50
Total length:					69:33

Resonance digital download / streaming track listing
No.	Title	Lyrics	Music	Arrangement	Length
1.	"Resonance" (NCT 2020)	Penomeco; Damian; Kenzie; Jakob Dorof	Bobii Lewis; Karen Poole; Sonny J. Mason; Jia Lih; Jeremy "Tay" Jasper; Jayden Henry; Adrian McKinnon; Jordain Johnson; Julien Maurice Moore; Timothy "Bos" Bullock; Hautboi Rich; Kenzie; Mike Daley; Mitchell Owens; Wilbart "Vedo" McCoy III	Kenzie; Sonny J. Mason	5:14

== Personnel ==
Track listing is based on Resonance Pt. 2.

- Kenzie – vocal directing (track 1, 3, 5, 12–13, 18–19)
- Rick Ridges – vocal directing (track 2)
- Noday – vocal directing (track 4, 9, 19), Pro Tools operator (track 4)
- Deez – vocal directing (track 6, 9, 16)
- minGtion – vocal directing (track 6–7, 10, 14–15), piano (track 14–15), digital editing (track 7, 10, 14–15)
- Maxx Song (ICONIC SOUNDS) – vocal directing (track 11), Pro Tools operator (track 11)
- Hitchhiker – vocal directing (track 20), guitar and keyboards (track 20)
- Kim Boo-min – vocal directing (track 20)
- Rick Ridges – vocal directing (track 20)
- Kim Dong-hyeon – rap directing (track 5)
- NCT – vocals, background vocals
  - Taeil – vocals (track 3, 6–7, 12–15), background vocals (track 3, 7, 12–13)
  - Johnny – vocals (track 2–3, 6, 12–13, 18)
  - Taeyong – vocals (track 2, 4–5, 9, 12, 16, 20)
  - Yuta – vocals (track 3, 6, 12–15, 18)
  - Kun – vocals (track 3, 5–6, 11, 14–15, 20)
  - Doyoung – vocals (track 4–5, 9, 12, 14–16, 20), background vocals (track 4–5, 9, 12, 16, 20)
  - Ten – vocals (track 1, 11,13, 18), background vocals (track 1, 13)
  - Jaehyun – vocals (track 4, 6, 9, 12, 16, 19), background vocals (track 19)
  - Winwin – vocals (track 1, 4, 11)
  - Jungwoo – vocals (track 3–4, 6, 12, 18–19), background vocals (track 3, 12, 18)
  - Lucas – vocals (track 4, 9, 11, 13, 16)
  - Mark – vocals (track 1–2, 4, 10, 12, 19)
  - Xiaojun – vocals (track 6–7, 9, 11, 16)
  - Hendery – vocals (track 2–3, 11, 13, 18–19)
  - Renjun – vocals (track 3, 7, 10, 14–15), background vocals (track 3, 13)
  - Jeno – vocals (track 1–2, 10), background vocals (track 1, 3)
  - Haechan – vocals (track 1, 10, 12–15), background vocals (track 1, 3, 12–13)
  - Jaemin – vocals (track 9–10, 16, 18)
  - Yangyang – vocals (track 1–2, 11, 20), background vocals (track 1)
  - Shotaro – vocals (track 9, 16, 19–20), narration (track 21)
  - Sungchan – vocals (track 1–2, 5, 19)
  - Chenle – vocals (track 3, 6, 10, 14–15, 19–20), background vocals (track 3, 20)
  - Jisung – vocals (track 3, 10, 13, 18, 20)
- Jeremy "Tay" Jasper – background vocals (track 1)
- Jayden Henry – background vocals (track 1)
- Adrian McKinnon – background vocals (track 1)
- Wilston Jordain Johnson – background vocals (track 1)
- Maurice Moore – background vocals (track 1)
- Byeon Jang-moon – background vocals (track 2, 4, 11)
- Sonny J. Mason – background vocals (track 3, 9, 16)
- Bobii Lewis – background vocals (track 3)
- JUNNY – background vocals (track 6, 10, 14–15)
- Ninos Hanna – background vocals (track 6)
- Jisoo Park (153/Joombas) – background vocals (track 7)
- Patrick "J. Que" Smith – background vocals (track 13)
- Wilbart "Vedo" McCoy III – background vocals (track 18)
- Zayson – background vocals (track 19), bass (track 19), keyboard and synth (track 19), drums and FX (track 19)
- Simon Petrén – piano (track 6)
- Andreas Öberg – guitar (track 6)
- Jeong Yoon – piano (track 7)
- Lee Ji-hong – recording (track 1, 4, 10–11, 18), additional recording (track 5–6, 14–15, 18–19), mix engineer (track 5, 10, 18, 20), mixing engineer (track 14–15), digital editing (track 18)
- No Min-ji – recording (track 1, 5, 9, 11–15, 20), additional recording (track 4), digital editing (track 1, 12), mix engineer (track 1, 12)
- Jung Ui-Seok – recording (track 2), mixing engineer (track 1, 3, 9, 16)
- Kang Eun-ji – recording (track 3, 6, 9, 16, 18–19), mix engineer (track 3–4, 7, 9, 13–16), digital editing (track 16, 19)
- Jang Woo-yeong – recording (track 7), digital editing (track 5, 11, 16)
- Kwon Yoo-jin – additional recording (track 2, 4, 11), recording (track 7), digital editing (track 20)
- Lee Min-gyu – digital editing (track 2), mix engineer (track 2, 6, 11, 19), mixing engineer (track 2, 6, 19)
- Jung Yura – digital editing (track 3–4, 6, 9)
- Jung Ho-jin – digital editing (track 13)
- Kang Seon-yeong – mix engineer (track 4, 12)
- Goo Jong-pil – mixing engineer (track 4, 12)
- Kim Cheol-soon – mixing engineer (track 5, 20–21)
- Nam Goong-jin – mixing engineer (track 7–8, 11, 13, 17–18)
- Kim Chan-gu – mixing engineer (track 10)

=== Locations ===
Recording

- SM Big Shot Studio
- SM Yellow Tail Studio
- SM Blue Cup Studio
- SM SSAM Studio
- SM LVYIN Studio
- doobdoob studio

Editing

- SM Yellow Tail Studio
- SM Big Shot Studio
- SM SSAM Studio
- SM LVYIN Studio
- doobdoob Studio
- Sound POOL Studios

Mixing

- SM Yellow Tail Studio
- SM Blue Cup Studio
- SM Big Shot Studio
- SM SSAM Studio
- SM LVYIN Studio
- SM Blue Ocean Studio
- SM Concert Hall Studio
- MonoTree Studio
- KLANG STUDIO
- Sound POOL Studios

== Charts ==
=== Weekly charts ===
Weekly chart performance for both Resonance Pt. 1 and Resonance Pt. 2
Chart (2020–2021)	Peak position	
Chart (2020–2021)	Pt. 1	Pt. 2
Belgian Albums (Ultratop Flanders)	120	77
Belgian Albums (Ultratop Wallonia)	–	152
Canadian Albums (Billboard)	95	—
Hungarian Albums (MAHASZ)	8	11
Japanese Albums (Oricon)	2	3
Japan Hot Albums (Billboard)	11	35
South Korean Albums (Circle)	1	1
Swedish Physical Albums (Sverigetopplistan)	13	—
UK Album Downloads (Official Charts)	36	—
US Billboard 200	6	—
US Independent Albums (Billboard)	1	—
US World Albums (Billboard)	1	—

=== Monthly charts ===
Monthly chart performance for both Resonance Pt. 1 and Resonance Pt. 2
Chart (2020)	Peak position	
Chart (2020)	Pt. 1	Pt. 2
Japanese Albums (Oricon)	6	—
South Korean Albums (Gaon)	1	1

=== Year-end charts ===
Year-end chart performance
Chart (2020)	Position	
Chart (2020)	Pt. 1	Pt. 2
Japanese Albums (Oricon)	37 (Note: Oricon combines both Resonance Pt. 1 and Resonance Pt. 2 to the chart.)	
South Korean Albums (Gaon)	4	9
US World Albums (Billboard)	11	—
US Top Album Sales	91	—
US Top Current Album Sales	71	—
Chart (2021)	Position	
Japanese Albums (Oricon)	55	
South Korean Albums (Gaon)	—	34
US World Albums (Billboard)	7	—

== Certifications and sales ==
Certifications and sales for Resonance 2020
Region	Certification	Certified units/sales
South Korea (KMCA) Resonance Pt. 1	Million	1,405,384
South Korea (KMCA) Resonance Pt. 1 KiT version	Platinum	265,416
South Korea (KMCA) Resonance Pt. 2	Million	1,252,549
South Korea (KMCA) Resonance Pt. 2 KiT version	Platinum	358,503

== Release history ==
Album	Region	Date	Format	Distributor
Resonance Pt. 1	South Korea	October 12, 2020	CD; digital download; streaming	SM; Dreamus
Resonance Pt. 1	Various	October 12, 2020	CD; digital download; streaming	Universal Music; Caroline; Virgin EMI
Resonance Pt. 1	United States	October 16, 2020	CD	Capitol; Caroline
Resonance Pt. 1	South Korea	October 28, 2020	Kihno	SM; Dreamus
Resonance Pt. 2	South Korea	November 23, 2020	digital download; streaming	SM; Dreamus
Resonance Pt. 2	Various	November 23, 2020	digital download; streaming	Universal Music; Caroline; Virgin EMI
Resonance Pt. 2	South Korea	November 30, 2020	CD (Arrival Ver.)	SM; Dreamus
Resonance Pt. 2	South Korea	December 4, 2020	CD (Departure Ver.)	SM; Dreamus
Resonance Pt. 2	South Korea	December 14, 2020	Kihno	SM; Dreamus
Resonance Pt. 2	United States	December 18, 2020	CD	Capitol; Caroline
