= Sungchan =

South Korean rapper (born 2001)

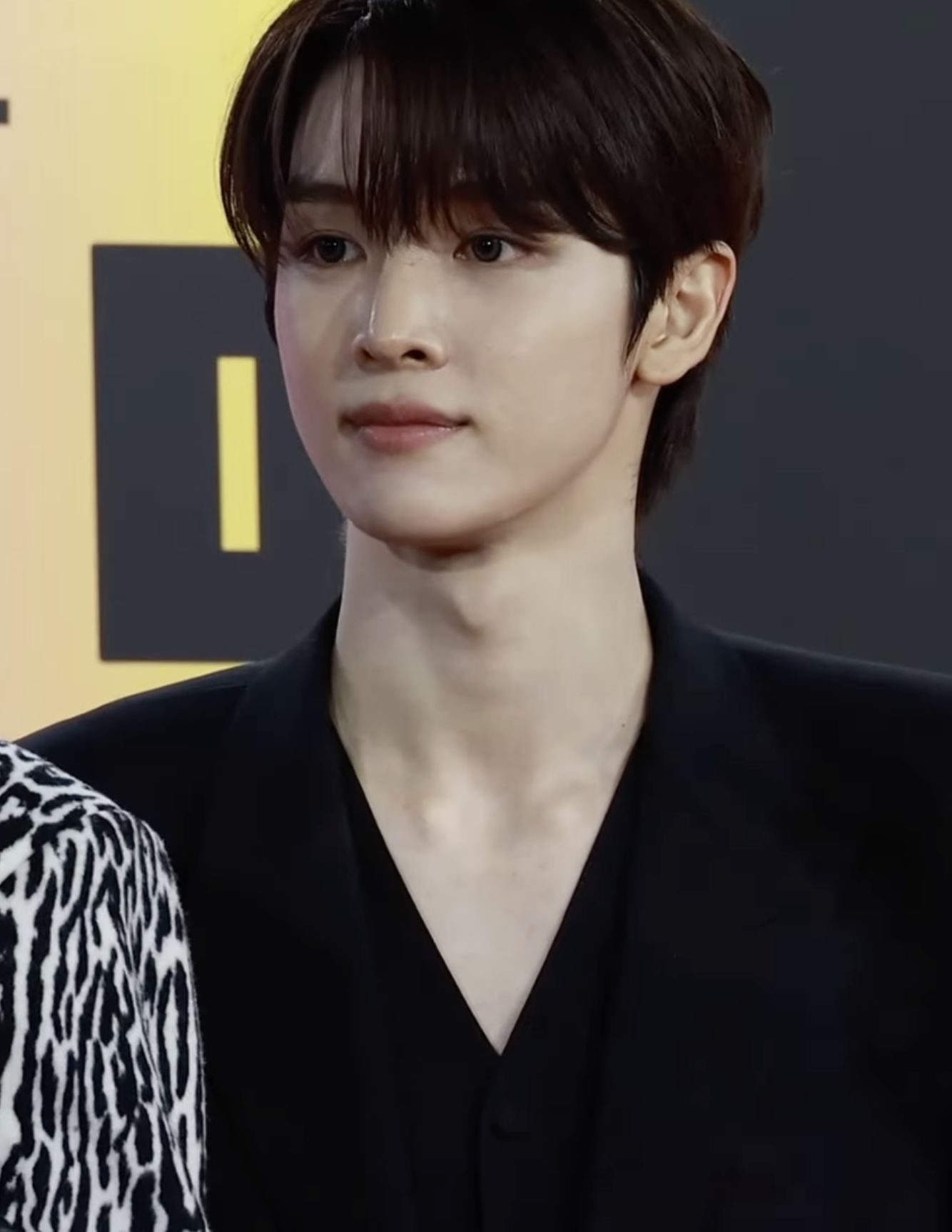
- Sungchan in 2024
- Born: Jung Sung-chan; September 13, 2001 (age 25); Seoul, South Korea
- Occupations: Rapper; singer; dancer
- Years active: 2020–present
- Musical career
- Genre: K-pop
- Label: SM
- Member of: Riize; SM Town
- Formerly of: NCT

Korean name
- Hangul: 정성찬
- RR: Jeong Seongchan
- MR: Chŏng Sŏngch'an

Jung Sung-chan (Korean: 정성찬; born September 13, 2001), known mononymously as Sungchan, is a South Korean rapper, singer and dancer. He rose to prominence in 2020 when he was introduced as a new member of NCT, a South Korean boy group managed by SM Entertainment. Following his activities with NCT, he departed the group in 2023 and later re-debuted as a member of Riize, also formed by SM Entertainment.

== Early life ==
Sungchan was born on September 13, 2001, in Seoul, South Korea. He has a brother two years older than him. While attending Guryong Elementary School, he began playing soccer and continued as a striker on the school team throughout his time at Eonbuk Middle School.

Sungchan was first street-cast by SM Entertainment and, although initially uncertain about the opportunity, decided to pursue it after being approached a second time. Feeling unprepared for an audition, he enrolled in a dance academy to develop his skills. After further training, he auditioned and was accepted as a trainee at SM Entertainment. Sungchan trained for four years before his debut.

== Career ==
=== 2020–2023: Debut in NCT and departure ===
Sungchan became a member of the South Korean boy group NCT on September 20, 2020, when he and Shotaro were formally introduced as new additions to the group alongside the announcement of NCT's second full-length album, NCT 2020 Resonance Pt. 1. Further details were released the following day, and the album officially dropped on October 12. On November 9, SM Entertainment announced that the second part of the album would be released on November 23. To promote the release, Sungchan made his stage debut with NCT and its sub-unit NCT U, performing the single "90's Love", which was released on the same day.

On February 18, 2021, Sungchan was officially announced as a new host for Inkigayo, a popular weekly music program that broadcasts live every Sunday on SBS. This marked a significant step in his career, expanding his presence beyond performing for the first time to include hosting duties. From March 2021 to March 2022, he co-hosted the show alongside An Yu-jin from the girl group Ive and Jihoon from the boy group Treasure. Together, they guided viewers through live performances, music charts, and special segments.

Sungchan also appeared in Welcome to NCT Universe, a variety show alongside Shotaro in which they introduced SM Rookies Seunghan, Eunseok, and Shohei to the world of NCT. The ten-episode series aired from November 2022 to February 2023 on TVING in South Korea, as well as on Nippon TV and Hulu in Japan. The show also featured Sungchan's participation in the SM Town Live 2022: SMCU Express concert tour in August 2022, performing "Outro: Dream Routine" with Shotaro and the SM Rookies.

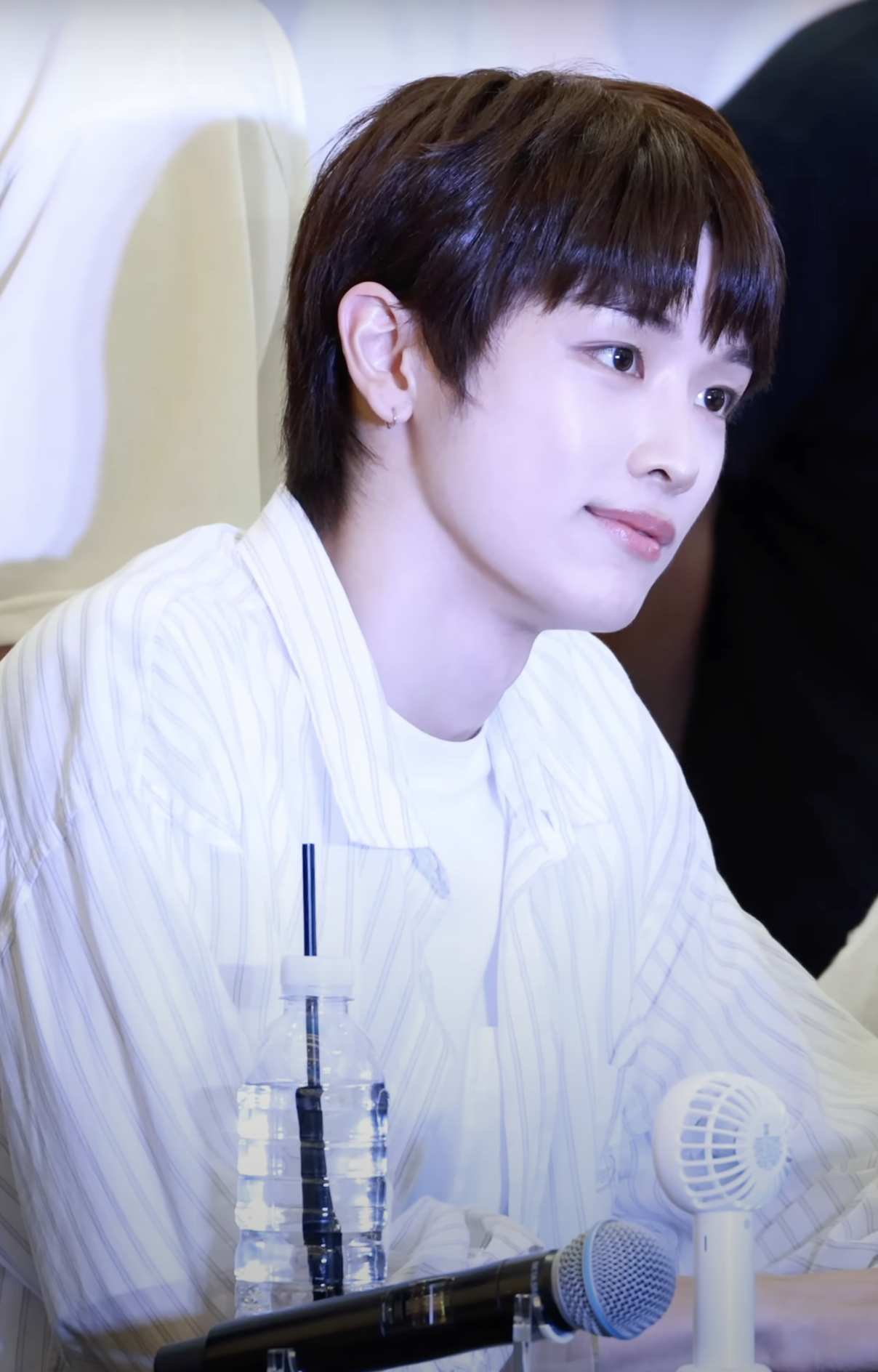
Sungchan in 2023

Although he was initially expected to join NCT's then-upcoming Japan-based subunit, more than two years passed without Sungchan being added to a fixed unit within the group. On May 24, 2023, the group's agency announced that Sungchan, along with Shotaro, would be departing from NCT. In the official statement, the agency explained that the two would be "closing their chapter with NCT" and confirmed that they would debut in a new boy group set to launch in late 2023.

=== 2023–present: Riize ===
The first mention of SM Entertainment's new boy group came on February 3, 2023, when the company released a video outlining its future plans under the SM 3.0 initiative. In the video, SM announced that the group was scheduled to debut in the fourth quarter of 2023, with the project led by SM Entertainment's COO, Tak Young-jun. In July, The Chosun Ilbo reported that the new boy group was preparing for their debut and had begun filming a music video in Los Angeles, a detail later confirmed by SM Entertainment. Sungchan was officially introduced as a member of Riize on August 1, 2023 and made his first appearance with the group in a performance video for "Siren" released on August 7. Riize officially debuted on September 4 with the single album Get a Guitar, which sold over one million copies in its first week.

== Other ventures ==
=== Endorsements ===
Since his debut, Sungchan has been featured in advertisements for various brands, with a focus on skincare and fashion. In 2021, he was chosen as a brand model for South Korean skincare brands Dr.G and Round A'Round. The following year, he was named the new brand model for the popular South Korean clothing brand SPAO, recognized for its trendy and affordable styles. He has also appeared in fashion magazine pictorials, including Allure Korea and Numéro Tokyo.

=== Ambassadorship ===
In 2021, Sungchan was appointed as the year's M-clean goodwill ambassador, as part of MBN's long-running campaign to promote positive online behavior and address issues such as verbal abuse and the spread of harmful online content.

== Discography ==
=== Other charted songs ===
List of other charted songs, showing year released, selected chart positions, and name of the album
Title	Year	Peak chart positions	Album
Title	Year	KOR Down.	Album
"Jet" (with Eunhyuk, Hyo, Taeyong, Jaemin, Winter and Giselle)	2022	108	2022 Winter SM Town: SMCU Palace

== Videography ==
=== Music video appearances ===
Year	Title	Artist	Ref.
2021	"Free to Fly"	Kangta	

== Filmography ==
=== Hosting ===
Year	Title	Role	Note(s)	Ref.
2021-2022	Inkigayo	Host	with Jihoon and An Yu-jin	
2023	Inkigayo	Special MC	with Park Ji-hu and Woonhak on September 17th	
2023	Inkigayo	Special MC	with Park Ji-hu and Woonhak on November 5th	
2024	Inkigayo	Special MC	with Park Ji-hu and Woonhak on January 7th	

=== Television ===
Year	Title	Role	Notes	Ref.
2020	NCT World 2.0	Cast member	Variety show, aired on Mnet	
2022	Welcome to NCT Universe	Cast member	Variety show	
