= Sunburst (song) =

- Digital cover

Single by Riize
- Language: Japanese; English
- B-side: "Rise Over"; "Kill Shot"
- Released: July 27, 2026
- Genre: House; Dance
- Length: 3:16
- Label: SM; EMI; Universal Japan
- Composers: Michael Jeffrey Jiminez; Andre Harris; David Borrego; Josh Harris; Micah Powell; Alvin Isaacs II; Jah-youth k-twan Lopez-smith; Eben Franckewitz; Caleb Hulin; Kosmic
- Lyricist: Rose Blueming

Riize singles chronology
"Do Your Dance" (2026)	"Sunburst" (2026)	"Insomnia" (2026)

Riize Japanese singles chronology
"All of You" (2026)	"Sunburst" (2026)

Music video
- "Sunburst" on YouTube

"Sunburst" is a song recorded by South Korean boy band Riize. It was released digitally on July 27, 2026, followed by a CD single on August 26, along with B-side tracks "Rise Over" and "Kill Shot". The song serves as the group's third original Japanese single, following "All of You" (2026), and the group's fourth Japanese single overall. Released through SM Entertainment and Universal Music Japan.

== Background and release ==
On July 9, 2026, Riize announced their third Japanese single, "Sunburst", which was set to be released on August 26. They later performed the song during their second Japanese fan meeting tour, RPG - Riize Playing Game, from July 10 to July 24. On July 25, 2026, a day after the last date of the fan meeting tour, SM Entertainment announced the digital release of the single on July 27.

The physical single was released on August 26, 2026, alongside the digital release of the B-side "Rise Over", the previously released song "Kill Shot", and the music video for "Sunburst" on YouTube. The music video was directed by Annie Chung.

== Composition ==
"Sunburst" is a house-influenced dance that evokes the atmosphere of a summer day. Its bright synthesizer sounds are paired with rhythmic beats, while the lyrics liken dazzling sunlight to the shared moment and future with another person. Lyrics for the song were written by Rose Blueming, with composition by Michael Jeffrey Jiminez, Andre Harris, David Borrego, Josh Harris, Micah Powell, Alvin Isaacs II, Jah-youth k-twan Lopez-smith, Eben Franckewitz, Caleb Hulin, and Kosmic.

== Commercial reception ==
Within Japan, "Sunburst" was commercially successful. On the Oricon Singles Chart, the song entered at number two for the tracking week ending August 30, selling 251,099 units. On the Oricon Combined Singles Chart, the song debuted at number two for the same week. On Billboard Japan's Billboard Japan Hot 100, "Sunburst" peaked at number two for the chart dated September 7.

== Track listing ==
Track listing adapted from Tidal.

Track listing for "Sunburst"
No.	Title	Lyrics	Music	Arrangement	Length
1.	"Sunburst"	Rose Blueming	Michael Jeffrey Jiminez; Andre Harris; David Borrego; Josh Harris; Micah Powell; Alvin Isaacs II; Jah-youth k-twan Lopez-smith; Eben Franckewitz; Caleb Hulin; Kosmic	Alvin Isaacs II; Andre Harris; Josh Harris	3:16
2.	"Rise Over"	Fast Lane	Fast Lane	Fast Lane	3:30
3.	"Kill Shot"	Ambass; Kohki	Kohki; Sky Beatz; Lil'Yukichi; Yung as Kody	Sky Beatz; Lil'Yukichi; Yung as Kody	3:12
Total length:					9:58

== Charts ==
=== Weekly charts ===
Weekly chart performance for "Sunburst"
Chart (2026)	Peak position
Japan (Oricon)	2
Japan Combined Singles (Oricon)	2
Japan Anime Singles (Oricon)	1
Japan Hot 100 (Billboard)	2
South Korea Download (Circle)	51

=== Monthly charts ===
Monthly chart performance for "Sunburst"
Chart (2026)	Position
Japan (Oricon)	6
Japan Anime Singles (Oricon)	1

== Certifications ==
Certifications for "Sunburst"
Region	Certification	Certified units/sales
Japan (RIAJ)	Platinum	250,000^{^}
^{^} Shipments figures based on certification alone.

== Release history ==
Release history for "Sunburst"
Region	Date	Format	Label
Various	July 27, 2026	Digital download; streaming	SM; EMI; Universal Japan
Japan	August 26, 2026	CD	SM; EMI; Universal Japan
