= Tae-il =

- Hangul: 태일
- RR: Taeil
- MR: T'aeil

Tae-il is a Korean given name.

People with this name include:

- Jeon Tae-il (1948–1970), South Korean activist who burned himself to death in protest of the poor working conditions in South Korean factories
- Yoon Tae-il (born 1964), South Korean handball player
- Chang Tae-il (born 1965), South Korean boxer
- Lee Tae-il (born 1990), South Korean singer, member of boy band Block B
- Moon Tae-il (born 1994), South Korean singer, former member of boy band NCT

Fictional characters with this name include:

- Han Tae-il, in 2014 South Korean film Man in Love
- Park Tae-il, in 2014 South Korean television series You're All Surrounded

== See also ==
- List of Korean given names
