= II (EP) =

- Digital cover

EP by Riize
- Released: June 15, 2026
- Length: 17:48
- Languages: Korean; English
- Labels: SM; Kakao; RCA
- Producers: Kenzie; Ronny Svendsen; Pizzapunk; Dwilly; Virtual Riot; Geek Boy; Mike Daley; Mitchell Owens; Chaz Jackson; Raz Palm

Riize chronology
Fame (2025)	II (2026)	Emotiion (2027)

Singles from II
- 1. "Do Your Dance" Released: June 15, 2026

II is the second extended play by South Korean boy group Riize. It was released by SM Entertainment on June 15, 2026, and contains six tracks, including the lead single "Do Your Dance".

== Background and release ==
On May 22, 2026, it was announced that Riize would release their second extended play titled II on June 15. The album promotional dates were also released on the same day.

Each member teaser images and teaser videos were released on May 25, May 26, May 27, May 28, May 29, and May 30. Group teaser images were subsequently released on May 31, June 1, June 2, June 3, June 4, and June 5. A video teaser was released on June 6. A short preview for the lead single "Do Your Dance" was released on June 12, followed by the music video teaser on June 14. The extended play was released alongside the music video for the lead single on June 15.

== Composition ==
The first track, "Soar", is an alternative rock song characterised by its driving tempo and energetic sound, built around straight drum beats, rough-textured guitar riffs, and prominent synthesizer arrangements. The second track and the lead single, titled "Do Your Dance", is an uptempo dance song that combines hip-hop beats with electronic pop elements, characterised by its prominent distorted 808 bass, catchy repeating chorus, and energetic atmosphere. The third track, "D-D-Done", is a bass house song that combines a lively West Coast-inspired rhythm with emotional vocals and energetic rap performances, creating a refreshing and vibrant sound.

"Overdrive", the fourth track of the extended play, is an R&B hip-hop song characterised by its heavy bass-driven beat shifts and dynamic vocal performances that alternate between power and delicacy, while its lyrics compare the experience of surpassing self-imposed limits to the exhilarating sensation of high speed. The fifth track, "Like a Bomb", is a dance song characterised by rhythmic funky grooves and diverse synthesizer arrangements, with lyrics that compare burgeoning emotions to a spark on a fuse and portray the excitement and attraction of falling in love. The last track, "In a Loop", is a pop anthem characterised by its sing-along chorus, powerful drum arrangements, and bright synthesizer-driven sound, conveying a hopeful message of enduring relationships amid life's recurring cycles and uncertainties.

== Promotion ==
Before the release of II, on June 15, 2026, Riize held a countdown event titled "R.B. High School Live". The event was broadcast live on YouTube, TikTok, and Weverse, aimed at introducing the album and connecting with their fanbase.

== Track listing ==
II track listing
No.	Title	Lyrics	Music	Arrangement	Length
1.	"Soar"	Kenzie	Kenzie; Ronny Svendsen; Adrian Thesen; Anne Judith Wik; Adrian McKinnon	Kenzie; Svendsen; Pizzapunk	3:10
2.	"Do Your Dance"	Lee Ha-ru	David Wilson; Gino Borri; Cyrus Villanueva	Dwilly; Virtual Riot	2:57
3.	"D-D-Done"	Danke (Lalala Studio); Joowon; Ondine	Ninos Hanna; Andreas Öberg; Geek Boy; Wiljam	Al Swettenham	2:50
4.	"Overdrive"	Joowon	Mike Daley; Mitchell Owens; McKinnon; Emily Yeonseo Kim	Daley; Owens	3:14
5.	"Like a Bomb"	Kenzie	Kenzie; Rodnae "Chikk" Bell; Chaz Jackson; Kosmic	Kenzie; Jackson	2:44
6.	"In a Loop"	Jonjon (XYXX); Jo Yoon-kyung	Rasmus Palmgren; Henrik Heaven; Kyle Wong; Markella Assimakis	Raz Palm	2:53
Total length:					17:48

== Charts ==
=== Weekly charts ===
Weekly chart performance for II
Chart (2026)	Peak position
French Physical Albums (SNEP)	178
Japanese Albums (Oricon)	1
Japanese Combined Albums (Oricon)	1
Japanese Hot Albums (Billboard Japan)	2
South Korean Albums (Circle)	1
US Top Album Sales (Billboard)	39
US World Albums (Billboard)	16

=== Monthly charts ===
Monthly chart performance for II
Chart (2026)	Peak position
Japanese Albums (Oricon)	9
South Korean Albums (Circle)	1

== Release history ==
Release history for II
Region	Date	Format	Label
South Korea	June 15, 2026	CD	SM; Kakao
Various	June 15, 2026	Digital download; streaming	SM; Kakao
