= Memories (Riize song) =

Single by Riize

from the album Get a Guitar
- Language: Korean; English
- Released: August 21, 2023
- Studio: SM Yellow Tail; SM Starlight
- Genre: Dance
- Length: 2:58
- Label: SM; Kakao; RCA
- Composers: Kenzie; Ronny Svendsen; Adrian Thesen; Anne Judith Wik; Bobii Lewis
- Lyricist: Kenzie

Riize singles chronology
"Memories" (2023)	"Get a Guitar" (2023)

Music video
- "Memories" on YouTube

"Memories" is a song recorded by South Korean boy band Riize. The song was released on August 21, 2023, through SM Entertainment and distributed by Kakao Entertainment and RCA Records, as the first single from the group's debut single album Get a Guitar.

== Background and release ==
In May 2023, it was confirmed by SM Entertainment that they would be debuting a new boy band in the second half of 2023, which would later become Riize. On August 7, SM announced that Riize would be making their debut with the release of a single album, Get a Guitar, and that the single album's release would be preceded by "Memories" on August 21. "Memories" was released for digital download and streaming on August 21.

== Composition ==
"Memories"
"Memories" is characterized by an "anthemic" chorus, with "nostalgic" synthesizer, "powerful beats" and "fast-paced rhythms."

The lyrics for "Memories" were written by frequent SM songwriter Kenzie. The song was composed by Kenzie, Ronny Svendsen, Adrian Thesen, Anne Judith Wik and Bobii Lewis, with Kenzie, Svendsen, and Thesen handling arrangement. Svendsen, Thesen and Wik are members of Norwegian production company Dsign Music. "Memories" is a dance song characterized by "nostalgic" synthesizer, an "anthemic" drum and bass influenced chorus, with "powerful beats" and "fast-paced rhythms". The lyrics of the song have been described as "introspective" and "youthful". "Memories" was composed in the key of F minor, with a tempo of 93 beats per minute.

== Critical reception ==
"Memories" received a positive reception from critics. Writing for NME, Carmen Chin called the song's chorus a "masterpiece", noting that "the track comes alive when the band's layered, sprightly vocal harmonies come together." Nazlican Ay, writing for The Honey Pop, called the song "beautiful" and "heartwarming", noting that the song's vocals sound "angelic".

NME included it on their list of "The 25 best K-pop songs of 2023" at number 25, with critic Lucy Ford calling the song's chorus "euphoric" and "one of the finest of the year".

== Music video ==
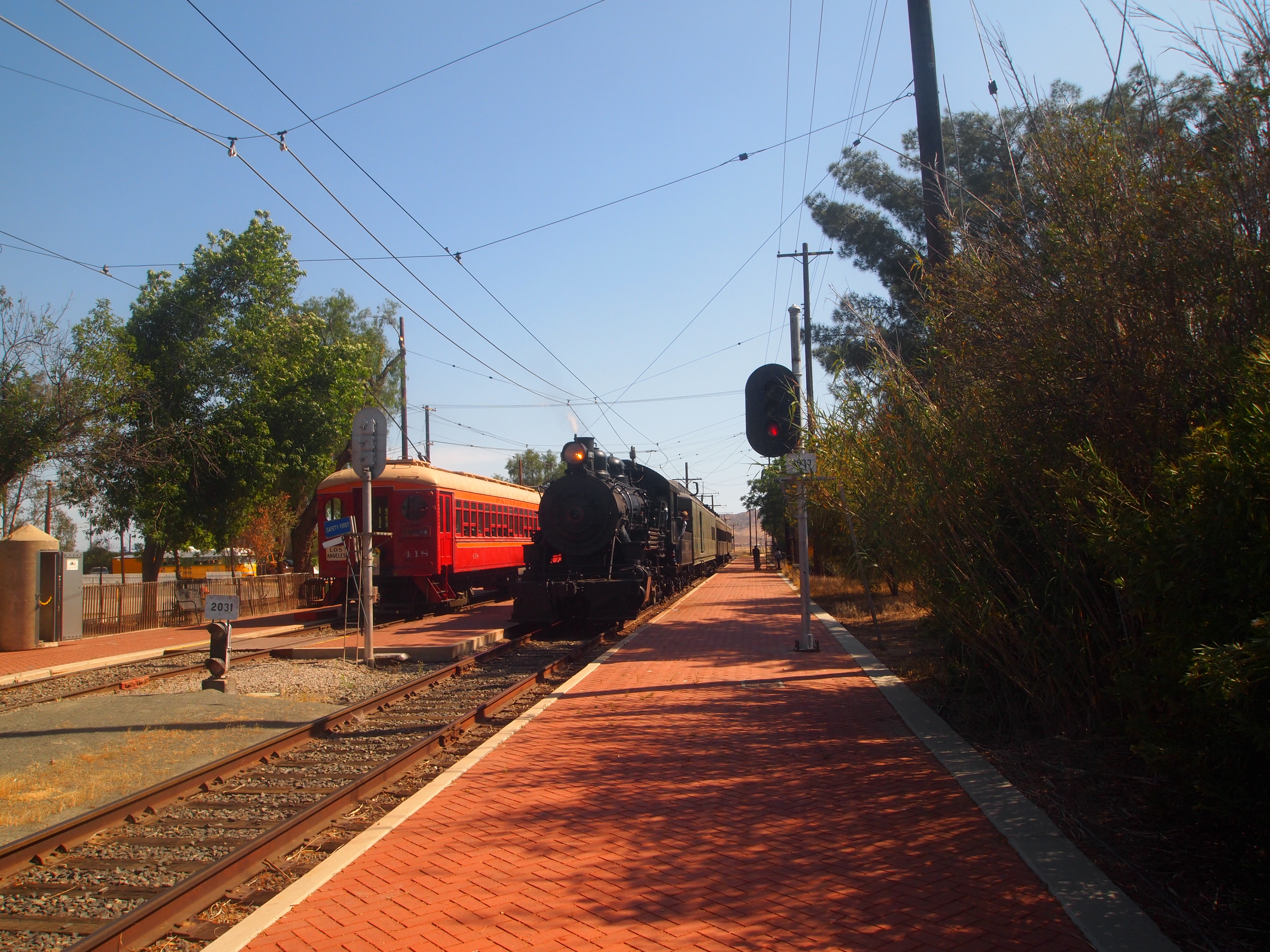
The Southern California Railway Museum is featured prominently in the music video.

Directed by Jinooya Makes, the music video for "Memories" was released simultaneously with the song on August 21, premiering on SM Entertainment's YouTube channel.

"Memories" was shot consecutively with "Siren" and "Get a Guitar" over a five day period in July 2023 at various locations in the Greater Los Angeles area, including Thousand Oaks and the Southern California Railway Museum in Perris. In the video, the band members are depicted running through grassy fields, swimming in a lake, and dancing amongst trains at a rail yard.

The end of the music video contains a short teaser clip of the group's next single, "Get a Guitar", teasing four seconds of the song's instrumental over clips of the song's music video.

== Live performances ==
On the day of the track's release, Riize appeared at KCON and performed the track. The performance was named as one of the "thrilling moments" of the festival by Grammy.com. In the lead-up to the single album's official release, the group performed the song on SBS's Inkigayo on August 27, continuing to perform the song on other South Korean music programs during the album's release week: Mnet's M Countdown on September 7, KBS's Music Bank on September 8, and MBC's Show! Music Core on September 9.

To further promote the song, the group also performed on Mnet's Performance37, MBC's It's Live, and Naver's Npop. On Npop, Riize performed for the first time without member Seunghan, who was absent due to illness. Riize also performed the song at award ceremonies, including the 2023 Indonesian Television Awards.

The song was also included in the setlist of the group's 2024 Riizing Day concert tour.

== Credits and personnel ==
Credits adapted from the single album's liner notes.

Studio

- SM Yellow Tail Studio – recording
- SM Starlight Studio – recording
- 77F Studio – digital editing
- SM SSAM Studio – digital editing
- SM Blue Ocean Studio – mixing
- Sterling Sound – mastering

Personnel

- SM Entertainment – executive producer
- Jang Cheol-hyuk – executive supervisor
- Riize – vocals
  - Sohee – background vocals
- Kenzie – producer, lyrics, composition, arrangement, vocal directing
- Ronny Svendsen – producer, composition, arrangement
- Adrian "Pizzapunk" Thesen – producer, composition, arrangement
- Anne Judith Wik – composition
- Bobii Lewis – composition, background vocals
- Xydo – background vocals
- Noh Min-ji – recording
- Jeong Yoo-ra – recording
- Woo Min-jeong – digital editing
- Kang Eun-ji – digital editing
- Kim Cheol-sun – mixing
- Chris Gehringer – mastering

== Charts ==
=== Weekly charts ===
Weekly chart performance for "Memories"
Chart (2023)	Peak position
Japan Download Songs (Billboard Japan)	69
Netherlands (Global Top 40)	38
South Korea (Circle)	99

=== Monthly charts ===
Monthly chart performance for "Memories"
Chart (2023)	Position
South Korea (Circle)	97

== Release history ==
Release history for "Memories"
Region	Date	Format	Label
Various	August 21, 2023	Digital download; streaming	SM; Kakao
