= All of You (Riize song) =

- Digital cover

Single by Riize
- Language: Japanese; English
- B-side: "Flashlight"
- Released: February 9, 2026
- Genre: Hip-hop; Electronic
- Length: 2:39
- Label: SM; EMI; Universal Japan
- Composers: Bobii Lewis; Kyle Wong; Strong Dragon
- Lyricist: Hasegawa

Riize singles chronology
"Fame" (2025)	"All of You" (2026)	"Do Your Dance" (2026)

Riize Japanese singles chronology
"Lucky" (2024)	"All of You" (2026)	"Sunburst" (2026)

Music video
- "All of You" on YouTube

"All of You" is a song recorded by South Korean boy band Riize. It was released digitally on February 9, 2026, followed by a CD single on February 18, along with B-side track "Flashlight". The song serves as the group's second original Japanese single, following "Lucky" (2024), and the group's third Japanese single overall. Released through SM Entertainment and Universal Music Japan.

== Background and release ==
In December 2025, Riize announced their second Japanese single, "All of You," which was set to be released on February 18. In February 2026, the group announced the digital release of the single on February 9, ahead of their Riizing Loud's Tokyo Dome date.

The physical single was released on February 18, 2026, alongside the digital release of the B-side "Flashlight" and the music video for "All of You" on YouTube. The music video was directed by Lee Hye-in.

== Composition ==
"All of You" is a hip-hop song characterized by electronic sounds, big band elements, and heavy drum beats, with lyrics expressing a confession of love that embraces someone as they are. Lyrics for the song were written by Hasegawa, with composition by Bobii Lewis, Kyle Wong, and Strong Dragon.

== Commercial reception ==
Within Japan, "All of You" was commercially successful. On the Oricon Singles Chart, the song entered at number two for the tracking week ending February 22, selling 287,000 units. On the Oricon Combined Singles Chart, the song debuted at number three for the same week. On Billboard Japan's Billboard Japan Hot 100, "All of You" peaked at number three for the chart published February 25.

"All of You" peaked at number four for the February 2026 issue of the monthly Oricon Singles Chart with estimated sales of 349,809 units, and was certified Platinum by the Recording Industry Association of Japan for sales exceeding 250,000.

== Track listing ==
Track listing adapted from Tidal.

Track listing for "All of You"
No.	Title	Lyrics	Music	Arrangement	Length
1.	"All of You"	Hasegawa	Bobii Lewis; Kyle Wong; Strong Dragon	Strong Dragon	2:39
2.	"Flashlight"	Yukinos	82oom; René Miller; Noah	82oom; Noah	3:47
Total length:					6:26

== Charts ==
=== Weekly charts ===
Weekly chart performance for "All of You"
Chart (2026)	Peak position
Japan (Japan Hot 100)	3
Japan (Oricon)	2
Japan Combined Singles (Oricon)	3
South Korea Download (Circle)	88

=== Monthly charts ===
Monthly chart performance for "All of You"
Chart (2026)	Position
Japan (Oricon)	4

== Certifications ==
Certifications for "All of You"
Region	Certification	Certified units/sales
Japan (RIAJ)	2× Platinum	500,000^{^}
^{^} Shipments figures based on certification alone.

== Release history ==
Release history for "All of You"
Region	Date	Format	Label
Various	February 9, 2026	Digital download; streaming	SM; EMI; Universal Japan
Japan	February 18, 2026	CD	SM; EMI; Universal Japan
