= Fame (single album) =

- Digital cover

Single album by Riize
- Released: November 24, 2025
- Studio: SM Azure (Seoul); SM Dorii (Seoul); SM Droplet (Seoul); Sound Pool (Seoul)
- Length: 8:39
- Language: Korean; English
- Label: SM; Kakao; RCA
- Producer: Elijah Waters; Josef Lamercier; Luke Titus; Mike Irish; Haring (MonoTree); Tim Tan

Riize chronology
Odyssey (2025)	Fame (2025)	II (2026)

Singles from Fame
- 1. "Fame" Released: November 24, 2025

Fame is the second single album by South Korean boy group Riize. It was released by SM Entertainment on November 24, 2025, and contains three tracks, including the lead single with the same name.

== Background and release ==
In August 2025, SM Entertainment announced in its roadmap that Riize would make their comeback in the fourth quarter of 2025 with a single album. On November 5, 2025, it was announced that Riize would release their second single album titled Fame on November 25. The album trailer video, alongside promotional dates, was also released on the same day. The tracklist poster was released on November 10.

Each teaser images were released on November 13, November 17, and November 18. A short behind-the-scenes video for the song "Fame" was released on November 21, followed by a teaser video the next day. The single album was released alongside the music video for "Fame" on November 24.

== Composition ==
The first track, "Something in the Water", is a dreamy R&B-pop track characterised by a subdued, resonant bass line. The lyrics reflect on confronting anxiety and recognising it as an intrinsic part of oneself in the process of personal growth. The second track, titled "Fame", is a hip-hop song in the style of Rage. The forward-driving rhythmic structure, combined with the raw timbre of the electric guitar, creates an energetic and dynamic sound. The last song, "Sticky Like" is a pop-rock influenced dance track characterised by its emotional and forceful tone. The song features prominent drum, guitar, and piano arrangements that enhance its overall impact.

== Promotion ==
Prior to the release of Fame, on November 25, 2025, Riize held a showcase event titled "Riize the 2nd Single 'Fame' Premiere" at Yes24 Live Hall. The event was broadcast live on YouTube, TikTok, and Weverse, aimed at introducing the album and connecting with their fanbase.

To promote the single, Riize appeared on several radio programs, including SBS Power FM's DinDin's Music High on the 25th, KBS Cool FM's Park Myung-soo's Radio Show on the 26th, and MBC FM4U's Kim Shin Young's Noon Song of Hope on the 27th.

== Track listing ==
Fame track listing
No.	Title	Lyrics	Music	Arrangement	Length
1.	"Something's in the Water"	Yoo Seul-gi (XYXX)	Elijah Waters; Josef Lamercier; Luke Titus; Mike Irish	Waters; Lamercier; Titus; Irish	2:26
2.	"Fame"	BigOne	Haring (MonoTree); Awrii (The Hub); ChaMane	Haring (MonoTree)	2:56
3.	"Sticky Like"	Yoon (153/Joombas)	Tim Tan; Wiljam; Ned Houston	Tim Tan	3:17
Total length:					8:39

== Credits and personnel ==
Credits adapted from the single album's liner notes.

Studio

- SM Dorii Studio – recording, digital editing (track 1)
- SM Droplet Studio – recording (track 2)
- SM Azure Studio – recording, digital editing, engineered for mix (track 2)
- SM Wavelet Studio – recording, digital editing, engineered for mix (track 3)
- Sound Pool Studio – recording (track 3)
- SM Big Shot Studio – mixing (track 1)
- SM Blue Ocean Studio – mixing (track 2)
- SM Concert Hall Studio – mixing (track 3)
- Sterling Sound – mastering (all tracks)

Personnel

- SM Entertainment – executive producer
- Riize – vocals (all tracks)
  - Wonbin – background vocals (track 1, 3)
  - Sohee – background vocals (track 1, 3)
  - Anton – background vocals (track 1, 3)
- Yoo Seul-gi (XYXX) – lyrics (track 1)
- Elijah Waters – producer, composition, arrangement (track 1)
- Josef Lamercier – producer, composition, arrangement, background vocals (track 1)
- Luke Titus – producer, composition, arrangement (track 1)
- Mike Irish – producer, composition, arrangement (track 1)
- BigOne – lyrics (track 2)
- Haring (MonoTree) – producer, composition, arrangement, vocal directing, programming, digital editing (track 2)
- Awrii (The Hub) – composition, vocal directing, background vocals (track 2)
- ChaMane – composition, vocal directing, background vocals (track 2)
- Yoon (153/Joombas) – lyrics (track 3)
- Tim Tan – producer, composition, arrangement (track 3)
- Wiljam – composition, background vocals (track 3)
- Ned Houston – composition, background vocals (track 3)
- Hyun – vocal directing (track 1), background vocals (track 3)
- Xydo – background vocals (track 2)
- Ondine – vocal directing (track 3)
- Shiry – guitar (track 2)
- Jeong Jae-won – recording, digital editing (track 1)
- Kim Joo-hyun – recording (track 2)
- Kim Jae-yeon – recording, digital editing, engineered for mix (track 2)
- Kang Eun-ji – recording, digital editing, engineered for mix (track 3)
- Kim Dong-il – recording (track 3)
- Lee Min-kyu – mixing (track 1)
- Kim Cheol-sun – mixing (track 2)
- Nam Koong-jin – mixing (track 3)
- Chris Gehringer – mastering (all tracks)

== Charts ==
=== Weekly charts ===
Weekly chart performance for Fame
Chart (2025)	Peak position
Japan (Oricon)	5
Japan Combined Singles (Oricon)	9
Japan Top Singles Sales (Billboard Japan)	5
South Korean Albums (Circle)	1

=== Monthly charts ===
Monthly chart performance for Fame
Chart (2025)	Position
Japan (Oricon)	19
South Korean Albums (Circle)	6

=== Year-end charts ===
Year-end chart performance for Fame
Chart (2025)	Position
South Korean Albums (Circle)	52

== Certifications ==
Certifications for Fame
Region	Certification	Certified units/sales
South Korea (KMCA)	Platinum	250,000^{^}
^{^} Shipments figures based on certification alone.

== Release history ==
Release history for Fame
Region	Date	Format	Label
South Korea	November 25, 2025	CD	SM; Kakao
Various	November 25, 2025	Digital download; streaming	SM; Kakao
