= Fame (Riize song) =

2025 single by Riize

Single by Riize

from the album Fame
- Language: Korean; English
- Released: November 24, 2025
- Studio: SM Azure Studio; SM Droplet Studio
- Genre: Hip-hop; Dance
- Length: 2:56
- Label: SM; Kakao; RCA
- Composers: Haring (MonoTree); Awrii (The Hub); ChaMane
- Lyricist: BigOne
- Producer: Haring (MonoTree)

Riize singles chronology
"Fly Up" (2025)	"Fame" (2025)	"All of You" (2026)

Music video
- "Fame" on YouTube

"Fame" is a song recorded by South Korean boy band Riize. It was released on November 24, 2025, through SM Entertainment and distributed by Kakao Entertainment and RCA Records, as the lead single of their second single album of the same name.

== Background and release ==
On November 5, 2025, it was announced that Riize would release their second single album titled Fame on November 25, with the lead single with the same name.

On November 21, a short behind-the-scenes video for the song was released, followed by a music video teaser the next day. The song and the music video were released alongside the single album on November 24. Lee Han-gyeol directed the music video.

== Composition ==
Lyrics for "Fame" were written by BigOne. Haring (MonoTree), Awrii (The Hub), and ChaMane made additional contributions to composition. The song is described as a rage influenced hip-hop song featuring a bold rhythmic progression layered with the gritty texture of electric guitar, creating a dynamic and energetic sound. The lyrics emphasise the desire to share genuine feelings and love rather than pursuing fame.

Professional ratings
Review scores
Source	Rating
IZM	3/5 stars

== Promotion ==
Prior to the release of Fame, on November 25, 2025, Riize held a showcase event titled "Riize the 2nd Single 'Fame' Premiere" at Yes24 Live Hall. The event was broadcast live on YouTube, TikTok, and Weverse, where they performed the song for the first time. They also performed the song on 1theK's 1theKILLPO On November 27. On November 29, they performed the song on 2025 MAMA Awards.

Riize later performed the song on various music shows, SBS's Inkigayo on November 30, KBS2's Music Bank on December 5, MBC's Show! Music Core on December 6, and SBS's Inkigayo on December 7.

== Credits and personnel ==
Credits adopted from the Fame liner notes.

Studio

- SM Droplet Studio – recording
- SM Azure Studio – recording, digital editing, engineered for mix
- SM Blue Ocean Studio – mixing
- Sterling Sound – mastering

Personnel

- SM Entertainment – executive producer
- Riize – vocals
- BigOne – lyrics
- Haring (MonoTree) – producer, composition, arrangement, vocal directing, programming, digital editing
- Awrii (The Hub) – composition, vocal directing, background vocals
- ChaMane – composition, vocal directing, background vocals
- Xydo – background vocals
- Shiry – guitar
- Kim Joo-hyun – recording
- Kim Jae-yeon – recording, digital editing, engineered for mix
- Kim Cheol-sun – mixing
- Chris Gehringer – mastering

== Charts ==
=== Weekly charts ===
Weekly chart performance for "Fame"
Chart (2025)	Peak position
Japan Download Songs (Billboard Japan)	36
Japan Digital Singles (Oricon)	36
South Korea (Circle)	54
South Korea Hot 100 (Billboard)	17

=== Monthly charts ===
Monthly chart performance for "Fame"
Chart (2025)	Position
South Korea (Circle)	113

== Release history ==
Release history for "Fame"
Region	Date	Format	Label
Various	November 24, 2025	Digital download; streaming	SM; Kakao
