= Do Your Dance =

2026 single by Riize

Single by Riize

from the EP II
- Language: Korean; English
- Released: June 15, 2026
- Genre: Dance; Electropop
- Length: 2:57
- Label: SM; Kakao; RCA
- Composers: David Wilson; Gino Borri; Cyrus Villanueva
- Lyricist: Lee Ha-ru
- Producer: Virtual Riot

Riize singles chronology
"All of You" (2026)	"Do Your Dance" (2026)	"Sunburst" (2026)

Music video
- "Do Your Dance" on YouTube

"Do Your Dance" is a song recorded by South Korean boy band Riize. It was released on June 15, 2026, through SM Entertainment and distributed by Kakao Entertainment and RCA Records, as the lead single of their second extended play II.

== Background and release ==
On May 22, 2026, it was announced that Riize would release their second extended play, II, on June 15, with the lead single title "Do Your Dance".

On June 12, A short preview for the song was released. Two days later, the music video teaser was released. The song and the music video were released alongside the extended play on June 15. Jinooya Makes directed the music video.

== Composition ==
Lyrics for "Do Your Dance" were written by Lee Ha-ru, daughter of rapper Tablo. David Wilson, Gino Borri, and Cyrus Villanueva made additional contributions to composition, while Virtual Riot produce the song. The song is described as an uptempo dance song that blends hip hop beats with electronic pop elements. It is characterized by the contrast between the heavily distorted 808 bass that drives the arrangement and the laid‑back, repeating chorus. The lyrics convey free‑spirited energy and self‑assured confidence.

== Promotion ==
Riize performed the song on various music shows, Mnet's M Countdown on June 18 and June 25, SBS's Inkigayo on June 22 and June 29, MBC M's Show Champion on June 24, and on MBC's Show! Music Core on June 27. They also performed the song on Studio Choom on June 18. On June 20, they performed the song as part of their set on Rapbeat Featival.

== Accolades ==
Music program awards for "Do Your Dance"
Program	Date	Ref.
Inkigayo	June 28, 2026	
Music Bank	June 26, 2026	
Show Champion	June 24, 2026	

Melon Popularity Award
Award	Date	Ref.
Weekly Popularity Award	July 13, 2026	

== Credits and personnel ==
Credits adopted from Melon.

- SM Entertainment – executive producer
- Riize – vocals
- Lee Ha-ru – lyrics
- David Wilson – composition
- Gino Borri – composition
- Cyrus Villanueva – composition
- Virtual Riot – producer, arrangement

== Charts ==
=== Weekly charts ===
Weekly chart performance for "Do Your Dance"
Chart (2026)	Peak position
Japan Hot Shot Songs (Billboard Japan)	10
South Korea (Circle)	18

=== Monthly charts ===
Monthly chart performance for "Do Your Dance"
Chart (2026)	Position
South Korea (Circle)	84

== Release history ==
Release history for "Do Your Dance"
Region	Date	Format	Label
Various	June 15, 2026	Digital download; streaming	SM; Kakao
