= Riize =

South Korean boy band

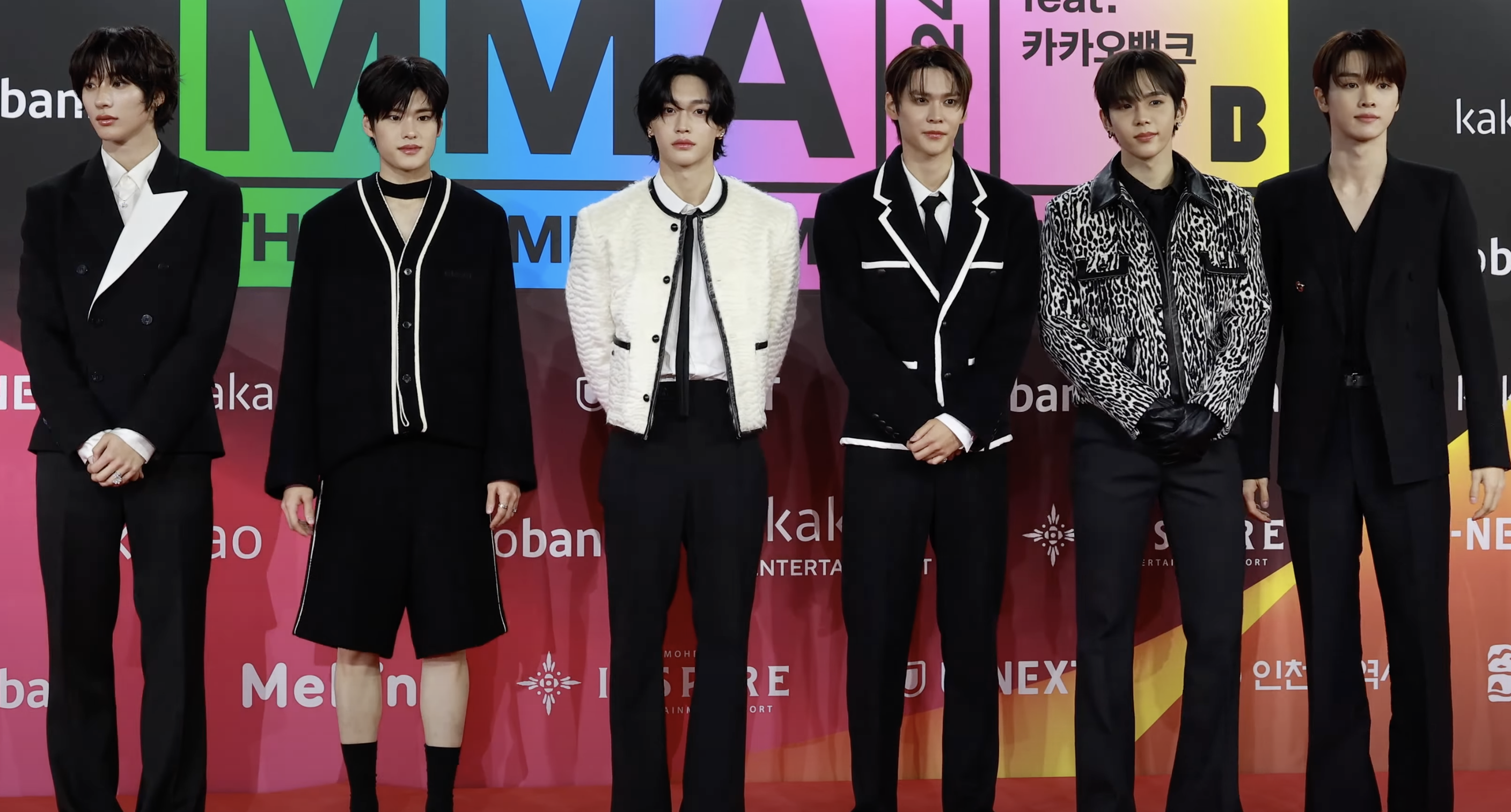
- Riize in November 2024; L-R: Anton, Sohee, Wonbin, Eunseok, Shotaro, and Sungchan

Background information
- Origin: Seoul, South Korea
- Genre: K-pop
- Years active: 2023–present
- Labels: SM; EMI/Universal Japan; RCA
- Members: Shotaro; Eunseok; Sungchan; Wonbin; Sohee; Anton
- Past members: Seunghan
- Website: Official website

Riize (Korean: 라이즈; stylized in all caps; pronounced as "Rise") is a South Korean boy band formed by SM Entertainment. The group consists of six members: Shotaro, Eunseok, Sungchan, Wonbin, Sohee, and Anton. Riize was originally a seven-piece ensemble; Seunghan departed from the group in October 2024. They debuted on September 4, 2023, with the single album Get a Guitar.

== Name ==
The group's name, Riize, is a name created by combining "Rise", which means "growth", and "Realize", which means "a team that grows together and realizes dreams".

== History ==
=== Pre-debut activities ===
Members Shotaro and Sungchan previously debuted in SM's boy group, NCT, being unveiled as part of the lineup in October 2020. On July 1, 2022, SM Entertainment introduced Shohei, Eunseok, and Seunghan as part of their SM Rookies lineup. In November 2022, it was announced that they would star in the reality show Welcome to NCT Universe, hosted by Shotaro and Sungchan.

The first mentions of SM's new boy group came on February 3, 2023, when SM released a video detailing the company's future plans with SM 3.0. In the video, they explained that the group would be debuting in the fourth quarter of 2023, with the project led by SM Entertainment COO Tak Young-jun.

On May 24, 2023, SM released a video regarding their future plans for the group, announcing that Shotaro and Sungchan would leave NCT to join the lineup and that Eunseok and Seunghan would be making their debut, and that Shohei would not be debuting. On July 11, it was reported that the seven-member boy group were filming their debut music video for a projected September debut. In response to media reports about Yoon Sang's son Anton Lee joining the group, SM stated that they would begin revealing information about the group on August 1. On July 31, SM confirmed that the group would debut as "Riize" in September. On August 1, the member profiles of all seven members were revealed, alongside the group's Instagram.

=== 2023: Debut, "Talk Saxy", and Seunghan's hiatus ===
On August 7, 2023, SM Entertainment announced that the group would be making their debut on September 4 with the release of their first single album, Get a Guitar. The album sold over a million copies in the first week of its release, earning the second most first-week sales of a rookie group's debut album.

On August 19, Riize released the web novel Rise & Realize ahead of the group's debut, in collaboration with Kakao Entertainment. Ahead of its release, Riize performed "Memories" and "Siren" at KCON LA on August 20. Riize released their pre-release single "Memories" on August 21. On September 4, SM Entertainment announced that Riize had signed a contract with RCA Records for their promotion and activities in the United States. At the debut showcase "Riizing Day: Riize Premiere", Riize announced their official fan club name to Sunz, which changes to Briize two days later due to potential negative interpretations of the name "Sunz". On September 7, the group made their official broadcast debut on Mnet's M Countdown where they performed "Get a Guitar", "Memories", and "Siren".

On October 22, it was announced that Riize would have their first comeback with the single "Talk Saxy" on October 27.

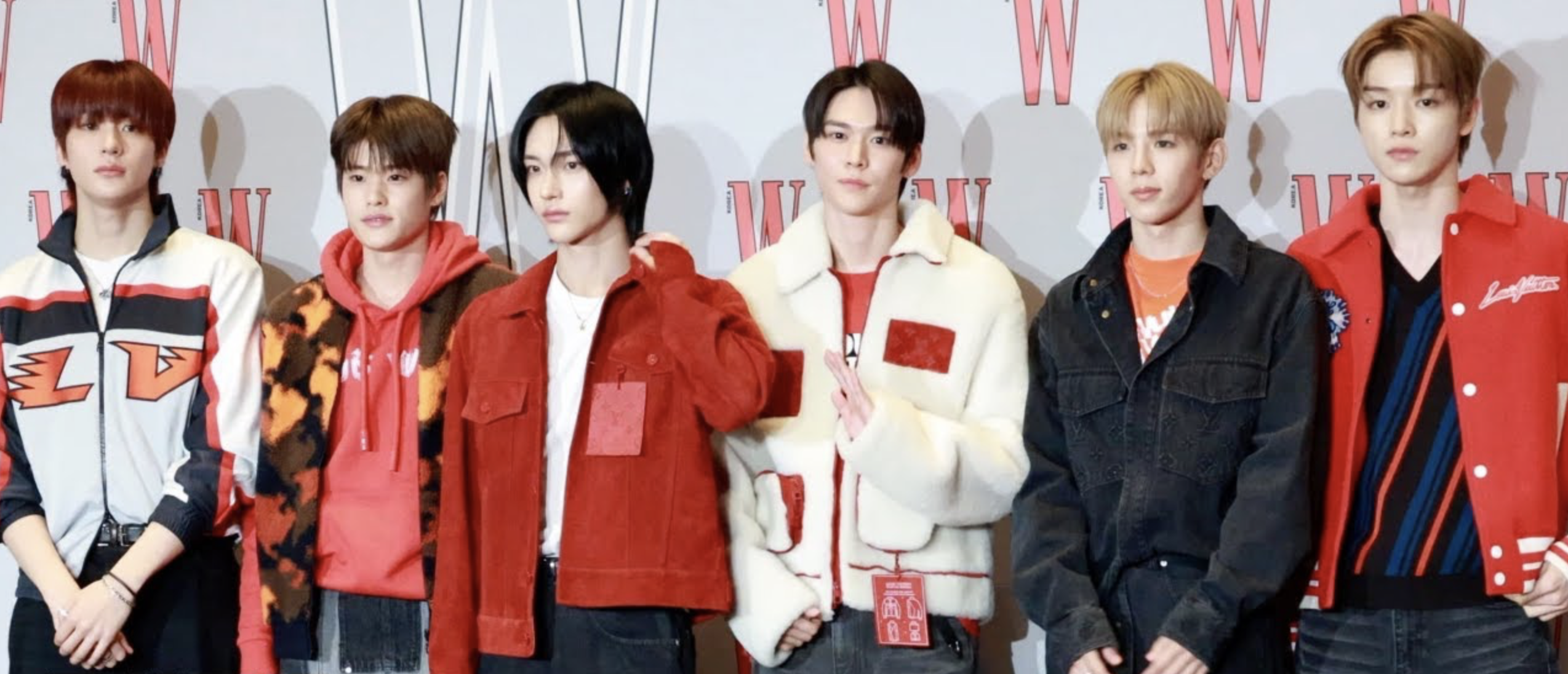
Riize attending the W Korea "Love Your W" event in November 2023

On November 22, SM announced that Seunghan would be put on indefinite hiatus due to rumors surrounding him. Due to this issue, SM said that they plan to submit a complaint to the police and are considering taking further legal measures against the leakers who are said to have spread false information to intentionally cause misunderstandings.

=== 2024: "Love 119", Japanese debut, Riizing, and Seunghan's departure ===
On January 5, 2024, Riize released their single "Love 119", and achieved their first music show win on January 18 episode of Mnet's M Countdown, as well as January 21 episode of SBS' Inkigayo. The group also released a Japanese version of the single on January 24, which marked their Japanese debut.

Riize released the full version of their pre-debut teaser "Siren" on April 3. The single is part of their first EP Riizing, which was released on June 17. They have released four more singles ahead of the EP's release; "Impossible" on April 18, and "9 Days", "Honestly", and "One Kiss" on April 29. The group also announced the dates for their fan-con tour Riizing Day, with shows scheduled between May 4 to August 31 across 9 countries.

On September 2, SM announced that Riize would be releasing their first repackage EP Riizing: Epilogue on September 4, 2024, along with its lead single "Combo". This date also marks the group's first debut anniversary.

On October 11, SM confirmed that Seunghan would be returning to group activities, including the group's "next chapter", scheduled to begin in November. Seunghan had been on hiatus from group activities since November 2023 due to released photos and videos showing him with a woman and smoking a cigarette prior to his debut. Two days after, amid backlash from South Korean fans, SM announced that Seunghan would be leaving the group and that Riize would continue as a six-member ensemble. The announcement was met with counter-backlash, mainly from international fans of the group, who criticized a perceived toxic cancel culture among South Korean fans and organized boycotts of the group's music and merchandise, with many K-pop stores joining.

=== 2025–present: Odyssey and II ===
In April 2025, it was announced that Riize would release their first studio album, titled Odyssey, on May 19, 2025. A concert tour Riizing Loud was announced to be scheduled between 2025 and 2026 across ten Asian countries. On November 24, 2025, Riize released their second single album Fame.

On June 15, 2026, Riize released their second extended play, II, also known as The 2nd Mini Album 'II'. The EP consists of six tracks, with "Do your dance" serving as the lead single. The title track, "Do your dance", is an uptempo dance song that combines hip-hop beats with electronic pop sounds. The song features a prominent distorted 808 bass throughout the track, contrasted with a cool, understated refrain. Its lyrics convey RIIZE's free-spirited energy and confidence.

== Other ventures ==
=== Endorsements ===
On August 16, 2023, Riize was selected by the Korean online fashion store Musinsa as its new ambassador. On August 25, domestic skincare brand UIQ selected Riize as its exclusive model. On December 11, luxury fashion house Louis Vuitton selected Riize as its house ambassadors.

On March 25, 2024, the Korean cosmetics brand Etude House selected Riize as its new models for "Overglow Tint". On April 18, The Coca-Cola Company's beverage brand Fanta selected Riize as its new brand model. In May, Riize has been selected as an ambassador for Nabati Richeese.

On March 6, 2025, Riize was selected by the lifestyle brand National Geographic Apparel as its 2025 spring campaign model. On the same day, Riize became the brand ambassador for footwear brand Crocs in Japan.

On September 18, 2025, the clothing brand SATUR selected RIIZE as its new model. Taking this opportunity, they unveiled various campaign collections at official stores and major fashion platforms in Korea.

=== Philanthropy ===
On January 21, 2025, Riize donated ₩100 million (US$74,611) to Walking with Us, a social welfare corporation that supports arts and culture programs for underprivileged children and youth, under the group's fanclub Briize. In November, Riize pledged HK$250,000 for victims of the 2025 Tai Po apartment fire in Hong Kong.

== Public image ==
Riize was introduced as a group who focuses on the genre of "emotional pop", a unique genre that expresses a variety of emotions through songs, which takes inspiration from everyday experiences in music.

== Members ==
Current

- Shotaro (쇼타로)
- Eunseok (은석)
- Sungchan (성찬)
- Wonbin (원빈)
- Sohee (소희)
- Anton (앤톤)

Former

- Seunghan (승한; 2023–2024)

== Discography ==
- Odyssey (2025)
- Emotiion (2027)

== Videography ==
=== Music videos ===
Title	Year	Director(s)	Notes	Ref.
"Memories"	2023	Jinooya Makes	Pre-debut	
"Get a Guitar"	2023	Jinooya Makes	Debut	
"Talk Saxy"	2023	Lafic		
"Love 119"	2024	Byul Yun	Korean and Japanese versions	
"Impossible"	2024	Jinooya Makes		
"One Kiss"	2024	Wizard Production		
"9 Days"	2024	Strtsphr		
"Boom Boom Bass"	2024	Oui Kim		
"Lucky"	2024	Cho Joon-koo (AIMUS)		
"Bag Bad Back"	2025	Lee Hye-in (2eehyeinfilm)		
"Fly Up"	2025	Oui Kim		
"Fame"	2025	Lee Han-gyeol		
"All of You"	2026	Lee Hye-in		
"Do Your Dance"	2026	Jinooya Makes		

=== Other videos ===
Title	Year	Director(s)	Notes	Ref.
"Siren"	2023	Jinooya Makes	Performance Video	
"Honestly"	2024	Kim Nam-suk (SEGAJI)	Live Clip	
"Ember to Solar"	2025	SOZE YOON (Studio GA•ZE)	Track Video	

== Concerts and tours ==
=== Concert tours ===
Title	Date(s)	Associated album(s)	Continent(s)	Shows	Ref.
Riizing Day	May 4, 2024 – September 15, 2024	Riizing	Asia; North America	31	
Riizing Loud	July 4, 2025 – March 8, 2026	Odyssey	Asia; North America	37	

=== Concert participation ===
- SM Town Live 2023: SMCU Palace (2023–2024)
- SM Town Live 2025: The Culture, the Future (2025)

=== Opening acts ===
- IU – H.E.R. World Tour (2024)

== Accolades ==
=== Awards and nominations ===
Name of the award ceremony, year presented, award category, nominee(s) and the result of the award
Award ceremony	Year	Category	Nominee/work	Result	Ref.
Asia Artist Awards	2025	Performance of the Year	Riize	Won	
Asia Artist Awards	2025	Best Artist – Singer	Riize	Won	
Asia Artist Awards	2025	Emotive Award – Singer	Riize	Won	
Asia Artist Awards	2026	Popularity Award – Group (Male)	Riize	Pending	
Asian Pop Music Awards	2023	Best New Artist (Overseas)	Get a Guitar	Nominated	
Asian Pop Music Awards	2024	Top 20 Song of the Year (Overseas)	"Love 119"	Won	
Asian Pop Music Awards	2025	Album of the Year	Odyssey	Nominated	
Asian Pop Music Awards	2025	Best Group	Riize	Nominated	
Brand of the Year Awards	2024	Rising Star – Male Idol	Riize	Won	
Circle Chart Music Awards	2023	Rookie of the Year – Streaming Unique Listeners	"Get a Guitar"	Won	
Circle Chart Music Awards	2023	Mubeat Global Choice Award – Male	Riize	Nominated	
Circle Chart Music Awards	2023	Rookie of the Year – Album	Get a Guitar	Nominated	
Circle Chart Music Awards	2023	Rookie of the Year – Global Streaming	"Get a Guitar"	Nominated	
D Awards	2025	Performance of the Year (Daesang)	Riize	Won	
D Awards	2025	Delights Blue Label	Riize	Won	
D Awards	2025	Best Group	Riize	Won	
D Awards	2025	Best Video	Riize	Won	
D Awards	2025	Best Popularity Award – Boy Group	Riize	Nominated	
Dong-A.com's Pick	2023	Rising Award	Riize	Won	
The Fact Music Awards	2023	Next Leader Award	Riize	Won	
Golden Disc Awards	2023	Rookie of the Year	Riize	Nominated	
Hanteo Music Awards	2023	Next Worldwide Artist	Riize	Won	
Hanteo Music Awards	2023	Artist of the Year (Bonsang)	Riize	Nominated	
Hanteo Music Awards	2023	Rookie of the Year – Male	Riize	Nominated	
Hanteo Music Awards	2023	WhosFandom Award	Riize	Nominated	
Hanteo Music Awards	2024	Artist of the Year (Bonsang)	Riize	Won	
Hanteo Music Awards	2024	Best Trend Leader	Riize	Won	
Hanteo Music Awards	2024	The Most Prime Group	Riize	Won	
Hanteo Music Awards	2024	Global Artist – Africa	Riize	Nominated	
Hanteo Music Awards	2024	Global Artist – Asia	Riize	Nominated	
Hanteo Music Awards	2024	Global Artist – Europe	Riize	Nominated	
Hanteo Music Awards	2024	Global Artist – North America	Riize	Nominated	
Hanteo Music Awards	2024	Global Artist – Oceania	Riize	Nominated	
Hanteo Music Awards	2024	Global Artist – South America	Riize	Nominated	
Hanteo Music Awards	2024	WhosFandom Award – Male	Riize	Nominated	
iHeartRadio Music Awards	2024	Best New K-pop Artist	Riize	Nominated	
Japan Golden Disc Awards	2024	Best 3 New Artists	Riize	Won	
Korea First Brand Awards	2024	Rookie Male Idol	Riize	Won	
Korea First Brand Awards	2026	Male Idol (Indonesia)	Riize	Won	
Korea Grand Music Awards	2024	Best Song 10	"Love 119"	Won	
Korea Grand Music Awards	2024	Fan Vote Rookie – Male	Riize	Won	
Korea Grand Music Awards	2024	Best Group	Riize	Won	
Korea Grand Music Awards	2024	Trend of the Year – K-pop Group	Riize	Nominated	
Korea Grand Music Awards	2024	Best Artist 10	Riize	Nominated	
Korea Grand Music Awards	2025	Best Artist 10	Riize	Won	
Korea Grand Music Awards	2025	Best Music 10	Odyssey	Nominated	
Korea Grand Music Awards	2025	Best Hip-Hop	"Bag Bad Back"	Nominated	
Korea Grand Music Awards	2025	Best Music Video	"Bag Bad Back"	Nominated	
Korea Grand Music Awards	2025	Best Dance Performance	"Fly Up"	Nominated	
Korea Grand Music Awards	2025	Trend of the Year – K-pop Group	Riize	Nominated	
Korean Music Awards	2025	Best K-pop Album	Riizing: Epilogue	Nominated	
MAMA Awards	2023	Favorite New Artist	Riize	Won	
MAMA Awards	2023	Artist of the Year	Riize	Nominated	
MAMA Awards	2023	Best New Male Artist	Riize	Nominated	
MAMA Awards	2023	Worldwide Fans' Choice Top 10	Riize	Nominated	
MAMA Awards	2024	Song of the Year	"Impossible"	Nominated	
MAMA Awards	2024	Song of the Year	"Love 119"	Nominated	
MAMA Awards	2024	Album of the Year	Riizing	Nominated	
MAMA Awards	2024	Best Dance Performance – Male Group	"Love 119"	Nominated	
MAMA Awards	2024	Best Choreography	"Impossible"	Nominated	
MAMA Awards	2024	Fans' Choice Top 10 – Male	Riize	Nominated	
MAMA Awards	2024	Favorite Global Performer – Male	Riize	Won	
MAMA Awards	2025	Artist of the Year	Riize	Nominated	
MAMA Awards	2025	Song of the Year	"Fly Up"	Nominated	
MAMA Awards	2025	Album of the Year	Odyssey	Nominated	
MAMA Awards	2025	Fans' Choice of the Year	Riize	Nominated	
MAMA Awards	2025	Fans' Choice Top 10 – Male	Riize	Won	
MAMA Awards	2025	Best Male Group	Riize	Nominated	
MAMA Awards	2025	Best Dance Performance – Male Group	"Fly Up"	Nominated	
MAMA Awards	2025	Worldwide KCONer's Choice	"Bag Bad Back"	Nominated	
Melon Music Awards	2023	Rookie of the Year	Riize	Won	
Melon Music Awards	2023	Favorite Star Award	Riize	Nominated	
Melon Music Awards	2024	Best Male Group	Riize	Won	
Melon Music Awards	2024	Global Rising Artist	Riize	Won	
Melon Music Awards	2024	Top 10 Artist	Riize	Won	
Melon Music Awards	2024	KakaoBank Everyone's Star	Riize	Won	
Melon Music Awards	2024	Artist of the Year	Riize	Nominated	
Melon Music Awards	2024	Millions Top 10	Riizing	Won	
Melon Music Awards	2025	Artist of the Year	Riize	Nominated	
Melon Music Awards	2025	Album of the Year	Odyssey	Nominated	
Melon Music Awards	2025	Millions Top 10	Odyssey	Won	
Melon Music Awards	2025	Top 10 Artist	Riize	Won	
Melon Music Awards	2025	Best Performance – Male	Riize	Won	
Melon Music Awards	2025	Best Male Group	Riize	Nominated	
Melon Music Awards	2025	Berriz Global Fan's Choice	Riize	Nominated	
Melon Music Awards	2025	Japan Favorite Artist by U-Next	Riize	Nominated	
Seoul Music Awards	2023	Main Award (Bonsang)	Riize	Won	
Seoul Music Awards	2023	Grand Award (Daesang)	Riize	Nominated	
Seoul Music Awards	2023	Rookie of the Year	Riize	Won	
Seoul Music Awards	2023	Hallyu Special Award	Riize	Nominated	
Seoul Music Awards	2023	Popularity Award	Riize	Nominated	
Seoul Music Awards	2025	Main Prize (Bonsang)	Riize	Nominated	
Seoul Music Awards	2025	Popularity Award	Riize	Nominated	
Seoul Music Awards	2025	K-Wave Special Award	Riize	Nominated	
Seoul Music Awards	2025	K-pop World Choice – Group	Riize	Nominated	
TMElive International Music Awards	2025	Breakthrough International Group of the Year	Riize	Won	

=== State and cultural honors ===
Name of country, year given, and name of honor
Country	Award ceremony	Year	Honor or award	Ref.
South Korea	Korean Popular Culture and Arts Awards (Note: Honors are given at the Korean Popular Culture and Arts Awards, arranged by the Korea Creative Content Agency and hosted by the Ministry of Culture, Sports and Tourism. They are awarded to those who have contributed to the arts and South Korea's pop culture.)	2025	Minister of Culture, Sports and Tourism Commendation	
