= Get a Guitar =

- Digital cover

Single album by Riize
- Released: September 4, 2023
- Studios: SM Big Shot; SM Yellow Tail; Doobdoob; Sound Pool; SM Starlight
- Genre: Dance
- Length: 5:38
- Languages: Korean; English
- Labels: SM; RCA; Kakao

Riize chronology
Get a Guitar (2023)	Riizing (2024)

Singles from Get a Guitar
- 1. "Memories" Released: August 21, 2023; 2. "Get a Guitar" Released: September 4, 2023

Get a Guitar is the debut single album by South Korean boy band Riize. Released on September 4, 2023, by SM Entertainment through Kakao Entertainment, the single album consists of two tracks, "Memories" and the title track of the same name, which both were released to promote the single album on August 21 and September 4, respectively.

== Background ==
SM Entertainment announced in May 2023 that they would debut their new boy band, seven years after the debut of NCT, with the announcement that former NCT members Shotaro and Sungchan would withdraw from the group to join the lineup and SM Rookies members Eunseok and Seunghan would make their debut. On August 1, the label revealed the seven-member boy group name "Riize", with three more members; Wonbin, Sohee, and Anton.

On August 7, SM announced that Riize would be making their debut with their first single album, Get a Guitar, which is slated for release on September 4, 2023. The single album would contain a total of 2 songs, with "Memories" was released as the pre-release single on August 21, and the title track with the same name was released on the same date as the album.

== Composition ==
The pre-release single, "Memories", is a song with synthesizer and guitar sounds, and lyrics about cherishing the memories of preparing and practicing together while dreaming the same dream. "Get a Guitar", the album's title track and the group's official debut single, is a song with retro synths and funky guitar rhythm, with the lyrics that show the process of understanding and empathizing with each other and becoming a team through music, and at the same time, the members gathered in one place according to the sound of the guitar, while conveying the message that they will realize their shining dreams.

== Promotion ==
Riize began the promotional cycle for Get a Guitar by attending the KCON 2023 in Los Angeles on August 20, 2023, where they performed "Memories" and the group's introduction performance "Siren". The group also performed "Memories" and "Siren" on national television for the first time at SBS's Inkigayo on August 27, 2023, a week prior their official debut.

== Reception ==
Professional ratings
Review scores
Source	Rating
NME	4/5 stars

Carmen Chin of NME wrote that the EP's "expectations were high – and they were successfully met", and she added that the group "have successfully highlighted their ability to craft a distinctive sound and establish themselves as emerging talents worth keeping an eye on".

== Commercial performance ==
Prior to its release on September 4, 2023, it was reported that Get a Guitar received 1.03 million pre-order sales, setting a new record as the most pre-ordered debut album out of any SM artist, and made Riize the first SM artist since H.O.T. in 1996 to have sold over a million copies with their debut album.

== Track listing ==
Get a Guitar track listing
No.	Title	Lyrics	Music	Arrangement	Length
1.	"Get a Guitar"	Peter Wallevik; Daniel Davidsen; Ben Samama; David Arkwright; Shin Na-ri; Bang Hye-hyun	Wallevik; Davidsen; Samama; Arkwright	PhD	2:40
2.	"Memories"	Kenzie	Kenzie; Ronny Svendsen; Adrian Thesen; Anne Judith Wik; Bobii Lewis	Kenzie; Svendsen; Pizzapunk	2:58
Total length:					5:38

== Credits ==
Credits adapted from the single album's liner notes.

Studio

- SM Big Shot Studio – recording, engineered for mix (track 1)
- SM Yellow Tail Studio – recording (all tracks)
- Doobdoob Studio – recording (track 1)
- Sound Pool Studio – recording (track 1)
- SM Starlight Studio – recording (track 2), digital editing (track 1)
- 77F Studio – digital editing (all tracks)
- SM LVYIN Studio – engineered for mix (track 1)
- SM SSAM Studio – digital editing (track 2)
- SM Concert Hall Studio – mixing (track 1)
- SM Blue Ocean Studio – mixing (track 2)
- Sterling Sound – mastering (all tracks)

Personnel

- SM Entertainment – executive producer
- Jang Cheol-hyuk – executive supervisor
- Riize – vocals (all tracks)
  - Eunseok – background vocals (track 1)
  - Seunghan – background vocals (track 1)
  - Sohee – background vocals (all tracks)
- Shin Na-ri (ARTiffect) – lyrics (track 1)
- Bang Hye-hyun (Jam Factory) – lyrics (track 1)
- Peter Wallevik (PhD) – lyrics, producer, composition, arrangement (track 1)
- Daniel Davidsen (PhD) – lyrics, producer, composition, arrangement (track 1)
- Ben Samama – lyrics, composition, background vocals (track 1)
- David Arkwright – lyrics, composition, background vocals (track 1)
- Kenzie – producer, lyrics, composition, arrangement, vocal directing (track 2)
- Ronny Svendsen – producer, composition, arrangement (track 2)
- Adrian "Pizzapunk" Thesen – producer, composition, arrangement (track 2)
- Anne Judith Wik – composition (track 2)
- Bobii Lewis – composition, background vocals (track 2)
- Jang Jin-young – vocal directing (track 1)
- Ju Chan-yang (Pollen) – vocal directing, background vocals (track 1)
- Xydo – background vocals (track 2)
- Lee Min-kyu – recording, engineered for mix (track 1)
- Noh Min-ji – recording (all tracks)
- Eugene Kwon – recording (track 1)
- Jeong Ho-jin – recording (track 1)
- On Seong-yoon – recording (track 1)
- Jeong Yoo-ra – recording (track 2), digital editing (track 1)
- Woo Min-jeong – digital editing (all tracks)
- Lee Ji-hong – engineered for mix (track 1)
- Kang Eun-ji – digital editing (track 2)
- Nam Koong-jin – mixing (track 1)
- Kim Cheol-sun – mixing (track 2)
- Chris Gehringer – mastering (all tracks)

== Charts ==
=== Weekly charts ===
Weekly chart performance for Get a Guitar
Chart (2023)	Peak position
Japanese Albums (Oricon)	2
Japanese Combined Albums (Oricon)	2
Japanese Hot Albums (Billboard Japan)	2
South Korean Albums (Circle)	1

=== Monthly charts ===
Monthly chart performance for Get a Guitar
Chart (2023)	Position
Japanese Albums (Oricon)	7
South Korean Albums (Circle)	2

=== Year-end charts ===
Year-end chart performance for Get a Guitar
Chart (2023)	Position
Japanese Albums (Oricon)	74
Japanese Hot Albums (Billboard Japan)	68
South Korean Albums (Circle)	34

== Certifications ==
Certifications for Get a Guitar
Region	Certification	Certified units/sales
South Korea (KMCA)	Million	1,000,000^{^}
^{^} Shipments figures based on certification alone.

== Release history ==
Release history for Get a Guitar
Region	Date	Format	Label
South Korea	September 4, 2023	CD	SM; Kakao
Various	September 4, 2023	Digital download; streaming	SM; Kakao
United States	September 8, 2023	CD	SM; RCA
