= Asian Pop Music Awards =

Hong Kong annual music award

- Country: Hong Kong & China
- Presented by: Asia VVV Entertainment Group (Hong Kong) & UK VVV Music Group Ltd. (London)
- First award: 2020 (online)

The Asian Pop Music Awards (Chinese: 亚洲流行音乐大奖) is a music award show jointly organized by Asia VVV Entertainment Group (Hong Kong) and UK VVV Music Group Ltd. (London). The show is held annually and is produced by the Asian Pop Music Awards Production Committee, with winners selected by the Asian Pop Music Awards Jury.

Preparations for the Asian Pop Music Awards began in 2018, and in September 2019 its ranking list, "APMA Charts" (Asian Pop Music Awards Charts), was officially launched. The Asian pop music chart is released every week, divided into Chinese chart and overseas chart with ten songs each.

On December 27, 2020, due to the impact of the COVID-19 pandemic, the Asian Pop Music Awards 2020 was changed from being held at the Hong Kong Convention and Exhibition Center to being held online, and was postponed to December. In addition, at the invitation of Chairman Wei of the Asian Pop Music Awards Production Committee, Hong Kong musician Liu Zhuohui joined the Asian Pop Music Awards 2020 Jury Panel and served as a judge.

== Ceremonies ==
Year	Date	Host
2020	December 27, 2020	Law Kar-ying
2021	December 27, 2021	Simon Yam
2022	December 28, 2022	—
2023	December 27, 2023	Grace Chan
2024	December 27, 2024	
2025	December 30, 2025	

== Jury awards ==
Winners are listed below for the 2020, 2021, 2022, 2023, 2024, and 2025 award ceremonies.

=== Album of the Year ===
Year	Winner (Chinese)	Winner (Overseas)
2020	JJ Lin – Drifter / Like You Do	Blackpink – The Album
2021	Eve Ai – How Come I Still Remember All (华语 偏偏我却都记得)	Tokyo Jihen – Ongaku
2022	G.E.M. – Revelation (启示录)	Blackpink – Born Pink
2023	Eason Chan – Chin Up!	(G)I-dle – I Feel
2024	Li Ronghao – The Dark Horse (黑马)	Aespa – Armageddon
2025	G-Dragon – Übermensch	

=== Record of the Year ===
Year	Winner (Chinese)	Winner (Overseas)
2021	Jam Hsiao – "Peter Pan" (华语 彼得潘)	CL – "Lover Like Me"
2022	Liu Yuxin – "Black Sun White Moon" (黑日白月)	Red Velvet – "Feel My Rhythm"
2023	Jackson Wang – "Cheetah"	NCT Dream – "Broken Melodies"
2024	Liu Yuxin – "Reality"	Le Sserafim – "Easy"
2025	Jin – "Don't Say You Love Me"	

=== Song of the Year ===
Year	Winner (Chinese)	Winner (Overseas)
2020	Jay Chou & Ashin – "Won't Cry"	Hwasa – "Maria"
2021	Mayday – "Because of You"	Lisa – "Lalisa"
2022	Jay Chou – "Greatest Works of Art" (最伟大的作品)	Blackpink – "Pink Venom"
2023	JJ Lin – "Dust & Ashes" (愿与愁)	Jisoo – "Flower"
2024	Khalil Fong – "Twenty Three" (才二十三)	G-Dragon – "Power"
2025	Kun – "Deadman"	

=== Best Collaboration ===
Year	Winner (Chinese)	Winner (Overseas)
2021	Tanya Chua & Carla Bruni – "Photographs" (华语)	Hyuna & Dawn – "Ping Pong"
2022	Li Ronghao & A-Mei – "Equivalence Relation" (对等关系)	Psy & Suga – "That That"
2023	JJ Lin & Anderson .Paak – "In the Joy"	BSS & Lee Young-ji – "Fighting"
2024	Sun Sheng Xi & Kiri – "Jagi"	Rosé & Bruno Mars – "APT."
2025	Jackson Wang & Diljit Dosanjh – "Buck"	

=== Best Music Video ===
Year	Winner (Chinese)	Winner (Overseas)
2020	JJ Lin – "Drifter"	Red Velvet – "Psycho"
2021	Eve Ai – "Greediness" (华语 贪)	Rosé – "On the Ground"
2022	Sandee Chan – "Pain Addict" (痛瘾)	Bae Suzy – "Satellite"
2023	Faith Yang & Buddha Jump – "Sabotage" (堕落)	Exo – "Let Me In"
2024	Li Ronghao – "The Other Side" (另一端)	Jennie – "Mantra"
2025	Jolin Tsai – "Pleasure"	

=== Best Original Soundtrack ===
Year	Winner (Chinese)	Winner (Overseas)
2021	Karen Mok – "Empty World" (华语 这世界那么多人) (for Love Will Tear Us Apart)	Baekhyun – "U" (for Doom at Your Service)
2022	Zhou Shen – "Photographic Film" (光字片) (for A Lifelong Journey)	Taeyeon – "Little Garden" (for Jirisan)
2023	William Chan – "Storm" (暴风) (for Faces in the Crowd)	Paul Kim – "You Remember" (for The Glory)
2024	Tanya Chua – "Learn to Live Again" (善良的我们) (for Imperfect Us)	Minnie – "Like a Dream" (for Lovely Runner)
2025	IU – "Midnight Walk" (밤 산책) (for When Life Gives You Tangerines)	

=== Best Dance Performance ===
Year	Winner (Chinese)	Winner (Overseas)
2021	WayV – "Kick Back"	Rain & Park Jin-young – "Switch to Me"
2022	Lay Zhang – "Veil" (面纱)	Seventeen – "Hot"
2023	Liu Yuxin – "Hurricane" (飓)	Seventeen – "Super"
2024	Wang Yibo – "Bystander" (旁观者)	Jimin – "Who"
2025	Jennie – "Like Jennie"	

=== Best Male Artist ===
Year	Winner (Chinese)	Winner (Overseas)
2020	JJ Lin – Drifter / Like You Do	Baekyun – Delight
2021	Jason Zhang – You Deserve Better (华语 张杰)	Kai – Kai
2022	Jackson Wang – Magic Man	Mino – To Infinity.
2023	Eason Chan – Chin Up!	Jungkook – Golden
2024	Lay Zhang – Step	Chanyeol – Blackout
2025	Lay Zhang – Rock the Heavenly Palace	

=== Best Female Artist ===
Year	Winner (Chinese)	Winner (Overseas)
2020	G.E.M – City Zoo	Mika Nakashima – Joker
2021	Eve Ai – How Come I Still Remember All (华语 偏偏我却都记得)	Jeon Somi – XOXO
2022	G.E.M. – Revelation (启示录)	Nayeon – Im Nayeon
2023	Kelly Yu – It's Me (是我)	Jisoo – Me
2024	Tia Ray – Allure	Wendy – Wish You Hell
2025	Jennie – Ruby	

=== Best Group ===
Year	Winner (Chinese)	Winners (Overseas)
2020	R1SE – Sunr1se	Blackpink – The Album
2020	R1SE – Sunr1se	Exo – Obsession
2021	PanThePack – The Pack	NCT 127 – Sticker
2021	PanThePack – The Pack	Red Velvet – Queendom
2022	Sodagreen – Little Universe (oaeen Version) (小宇宙 (鱼版))	(G)I-dle – I Never Die
2022	Sodagreen – Little Universe (oaeen Version) (小宇宙 (鱼版))	Seventeen – Face the Sun
2023	Accusefive – We Will Be Fine (带你飞)	New Jeans – Get Up
2023	Accusefive – We Will Be Fine (带你飞)	Stray Kids – 5-Star
2024	WayV – Give Me That	Seventeen – 17 Is Right Here
2024	WayV – Give Me That	XG – Awe
2025	Seventeen – Happy Burstday	
2025	Twice – This Is For	

=== Best New Artist ===
Year	Winner (Chinese)	Winner (Overseas)
2020	Chih Siou – "Elephant in the Room"	Aespa – "Black Mamba"
2021	Haezee – Love Maze (华语 黄玮昕)	Enhypen – Dimension: Dilemma
2022	Pei-Yu Hung – Silver Lining (明室)	Ive – Love Dive
2023	The Crane – Talent	Zerobaseone – Youth in the Shade
2024	Sha Yi Ting – Sensitive Kid (敏感小孩)	Babymonster – Drip
2025	Cortis – Color Outside the Lines	

=== Best Lyricist ===
Year	Winner (Chinese)	Winner (Overseas)
2020	Xiaohan – "Drifter" (by JJ Lin)	IU – "Love Poem" (by IU)
2021	David Ke – "Each Well" (各自安好) (by Rene Liu)	Sunmi – "Borderline" (by Sunmi)
2022	Vincent Fang – "Cold Hearted" (红颜如霜) (by Jay Chou)	Tokyo Jihen – "The Sin And the Glory" (by Tokyo Jihen)
2023	Francis Lee – "Serves You Right" (活该) (by David Tao)	Ayumi Hamasaki – Remember You (by Ayumi Hamasaki)
2024	Vincent Fang – "Youth" (青春要用几行诗来写) (by Eric Chou)	Woozi – "What Kind of Future" (by Woozi)
2025	Francis Lee – "From Dust to Dust" (微塵) (by David Tao)	

=== Best Composer ===
Year	Winner (Chinese)	Winner (Overseas)
2020	Alan Cheung Ka Shing – "Destination of Love" (by Miriam Yeung)	Aimyon – "On This Day We Say Goodbye" (by Aimyon)
2021	Lala Hsu – "Prototype" (雏形) (by Lala Hsu)	Kim Do-hoon, Cosmic Girl & Lee Hu-sang – "Where We Are Now" (by Mamamoo)
2022	Eric Chou – "Best Friend" (挚友) (by A-Lin)	Milet & Toru – "One Reason" (by Milet)
2023	Yoga Lin – "Wordless Groans" (我只是平凡却直拗爱着你的人) (by Yoga Lin)	Yoo Gun-hyung & An Shin-ae – "I Love My Body" (by Hwasa)
2024	Chang Shilei – "Duō shǎo de guāng yīn" (多少的光阴) (by Shan Yichun)	Jason Hahs, Colin Magalong, David Wilson & MZMC – "Love 119" (by Riize)
2025	JJ Lin – "Turn Of A Page" (by JJ Lin)	

=== Best Arranger ===
Year	Winner (Chinese)	Winner (Overseas)
2020	Howe Chen – "Requiem for the Nobles" (by Faith Yang)	R.Tee & 24 – "How You Like That" (by Blackpink)
2021	Ricky Ho – "Bluebirds" (by Tanya Chua)	Jia Lih & Yoo Young Jin – "Savage" (by Aespa)
2022	Howe Chen – "None of the Above" (以上皆非) (by Lala Tsu)	G’harah "PK" Degeddingseze, Patricia "Tricia" Battani & Steve Octave – "Illusion" (by Aespa)
2023	MizarMin – "F.F.F" (by Zhou Zhennan)	Ryan Tedder & Lindgren – "The Girls" (by Blackpink)
2024	Josh Levi – "Scary Movie" (by Yan Haoxiang)	250 – "Supernatural" (by NewJeans)
2025	Cody Tarpley, Ben Samama & Ryan Jhun – "Rich Man" (by Aespa)	

=== Best Producer ===
Year	Winner (Chinese)	Winner (Overseas)
2020	JJ Lin – Drifter / Like You Do (by JJ Lin)	Mino – Take (by Mino)
2021	George Chen – How Come I Still Remember All (偏偏我却都记得) (by Eve Ai)	Lee Soo-man – "Weekend" (by Taeyeon)
2022	Sandee Chan – Discipline (调教) (by Sandee Chan)	Teddy Park, 24, Danny Chung, Bekuh Boom & R.Tee – Born Pink (by Blackpink)
2023	Lay Zhang – "D.N.A" (by Lay Zhang, Gali, Shan Yichun, Wang Ziyi, Danko, Vinida & Victor Ma)	Soyeon – "Queencard" (by (G)I-dle)
2024	Khalil Fong – The Dreamer (by Khalil Fong)	Kenshi Yonezu – Lost Corner (by Kenshi Yonezu)
2025	G-Dragon & production team – Übermensch (by G-Dragon)	

=== Best Global Artist ===
Year	Winner
2020	Justin Bieber
2021	Adele – 30
2022	Taylor Swift – Midnights
2023	Lana Del Rey – Did You Know That There's A Tunnel Under Ocean Blvd
2024	Billie Eilish – Hit Me Hard and Soft
2025	Lady Gaga – Mayhem

=== Top 20 Albums of the Year ===
==== 2021 ====
List of Chinese and overseas winners

Winner (Chinese)	Winner (Overseas)
Tiger Huang – Be Alive; Tanya Chua – Depart; Lay Zhang – East; Cui Jian – A Flying Dog; Rene Liu – Each Well; WayV – Kick Back; Sammi Cheng – Listen to Mi; Cai Xukun – Lost; Eve Ai – How Come I Still Remember All; Karen Mok – The Voyage; Joker Xue – Extraterrestrial; Andrew Tan – The Only One I Wanna Know; Li Jian – Wu Shi Wu Ke; Joey Yung – Schrodinger's Cat; Mao Buyi – Lonely Planet; Kelly Yu – Intermezzo; Tia Ray – Once Upon A Moon; Freya Lim – Goodbye, Ciao, Seeing You Again; Jason Zhang – You Deserve Better	CL – Alpha; Baekhyun – Bambi; Itzy – Crazy in Love; Matcha – Dreaming; Heize – Happen; Chanmina – Harenchi; Hyuna – I'm Not Cool; Lisa – Lalisa; IU – Lilac; Kumi Koda – Angel + Monster; Tokyo Jihen – Music; Kenshi Yonezu – Pale Blue; Red Velvet – Queendom; Aespa – Savage; NCT 127 – Sticker; Mamamoo – WAW; Somi – XOXO; Sunmi – 1/6; Lee Hi – 4 Only; Rosé – R

==== 2022 ====
List of Chinese and overseas winners

Winner (Chinese)	Winner (Overseas)
Ailing Tai – Unwanted Song (不想听见的歌); Lala Hsu – Gei; Rachel Liang – She Matters (好好对待她); A-Lin – Link; Wu Qing-feng – Mallarme's Tuesdays; Jackson Wang – Magic Man; Pei-Yu Hung – Silver Lining (明室); William Wei – Good Afternoon, Good Evening and Goodnight (明天再见); G.E.M. – Revelation (启示录); Sandee Chan – Discipline (调教); Jess Lee – Over the Edge (痛快); Tia Ray – Trip; Joker Xue – Countless; Teens in Times – Utopia III (乌托邦lll · 侠); Liu Yuxin – Xanadu; Lay Zhang – West (西); Sodagreen – Little Universe (oaeen Version) (小宇宙(鱼版)); HAYA – Beast (野兽); Wang Feng – Maybe I Can Ignore Death (也许我可以无视死亡); Jay Chou – Greatest Works of Art	NCT 127 – 2 Baddies; Hikaru Utada – Bad Mode; Twice – Between 1&2; Seventeen – Face the Sun; Red Velvet – Feel My Rhythm; Blackpink – Born Pink; Itzy – Checkmate; NCT Dream – Glitch Mode; (G)I-dle – I Never Die; Nayeon – Im Nayeon; Taeyeon – INVU; LiSA – Lander; Stray Kids – Maxident; Hyuna – Nabillera; IU – Pieces; BTS – Proof; Psy – Psy 9th; Treasure – The Second Step: Chapter One; Milet – Visions; Mino – To Infinity.

==== 2023 ====
List of Chinese and overseas winners

Winner (Chinese)	Winner (Overseas)
Curley G – 0.25; Eason Chan – Chin Up!; JJ Lin – Happily, Painfully After (重拾_快乐); D.N.A – D.N.A; Accusefive – In The Clouds (带你飞); Sammi Cheng – Dream; Tan Jianci – Dreams; Faith Yang – Flow; Jackson Yee – Liu Yanfen (刘艳芬); WayV – On My Youth; The Landlord's Cats – World Youth (世界/青年); Kelly Yu – It's Me (瓦合); No Party for Cao Dong – The Clod; Whyte – Way Out; Astro Bunny – Ruthless Monster (无情怪物); Teens in Time – Teens in Utopia (乌托邦少年); Hua Chenyu – Hope; Lexie Liu – The Happy Star (幸福星); Hush – Pleasing Myself (娱乐自己); Li Yuchun – Have a Nice Weekend (周末愉快)	Milet – 5am; Enhyphen – Dark Blood; Exo – Exist; Jimin – Face; NCT 127 – Fact Check; Seventeen – FML; NewJeans – Get Up; Jungkook – Golden; (G)I-dle – I Feel; Ive – I've Ive; NCT Dream – ISTJ; V – Layover; Aespa – My World; XG – New DNA; Aimer – Open a Door; Ayumi Hamasaki – Remember You; Kai – Rover; Tomorrow X Together – The Name Chapter: Freefall; Jihyo – Zone; Stray Kids – 5-Star

==== 2024 ====
List of Chinese and overseas winners

Winner (Chinese)	Winner (Overseas)
Shi Shi – Boomerang; Tanya Chua – Imperfect Us: Original Soundtrack; Zhou Shen – Shenself (反深代词); Bibi Zhou – Have A Good Night; Zhou Zhennan – Heal My Broken Soul; Li Ronghao – The Dark Horse (黑马); Tan Jianci – Brilliance (焕); Zhang Zhenyuan – Cold Romance (镜花水月); Mao Buyi – The Inner Venture (冒险精神); Khalil Fong – The Dreamer (梦想家); Liu Yuxin – O, Vol. 1; Yan Haoxiang – Scary Movie I: Gaze; Lay Zhang – Step; Kelly Yu – Scorpio (天蝎座); Curley Gao – I'll Look At You (透过墨镜直视太阳); Xiao Zhan – Us (我们); Huang Qishan – Xiao Xia 3.0 (小霞3.0); Jason Zhang – 要得; Jam Hsiao – Wild/Mild (野生); Tia Ray – Allure (在与生俱来的不平衡里)	(G)I-dle – 2; Seventeen – 17 Is Right Here; Aespa – Armageddon; Stray Kids – Ate; XG – Awe; Chanyeol – Black Out; NCT Dream – Dream()scape; Babymonster – Drip; Itzy – Gold; Baekhyun – Hello, World; Kenshi Yonezu – Lost Corner; Tomorrow X Together – Minisode 3: Tomorrow; Jimin – Muse; Enhyphen – Romance: Untold; Taeyong – Tap; Ten – Ten; Taeyeon – To. X; Wendy – Wish You Hell; Doyoung – Youth; Yuqi – Yuq1

==== 2025 ====
List of winners
- Lisa – Alter Ego
- Radwimps – Anew
- Enhypen – Desire: Unleash
- Baekhyun – Essence of Reverie
- NCT Dream – Go Back to the Future
- Seventeen – Happy Burstday
- Stray Kids – Karma
- Jackson Wang – Magic Man 2
- Lay Zhang – Rock the Heavenly Palace
- Zerobaseone – Never Say Never
- Riize – Odyssey
- Jolin Tsai – Pleasure
- Rosé – Rosie
- Jennie – Ruby
- David Tao – Stupid Pop Songs
- Mark – The Firstfruit
- Tomorrow X Together – The Star Chapter: Together
- Twice – This Is For
- G-Dragon – Übermensch
- Chanyeol – Upside Down

=== Top 20 Songs of the Year ===
==== 2021 ====
List of Chinese and overseas winners

Winner (Chinese)	Winner (Overseas)
Jam Hsiao – "Peter Pan"; Tanya Chua – "Bluebirds"; Eason Chan – "Unexpected Summer"; Li Ronghao – "No Regrets"; Lala Hsu – "Prototype"; Rene Liu – "Each Well"; Diana Wang – "Machines"; G.E.M. – "Superpower"; JJ Lin – "Light of Sanctuary"; Jason Zhang – "You Deserve Better"; Ashin – "Future"; Faye Wong – "As You Wish"; Eve Ai – "Greediness"; Joker Xue – "Alien From the Sky"; Eve Ai – "One Such As"; Mayday – "Because of You"; Kelly Yu – "You Are"; Tia Ray – "Emo Whiskey"; Accusefive – "Where I Lost Us"; Karen Mok – "Empty World"	Kang Daniel – "Antidote"; Baekhyun – "Bambi"; Jessi – "Cold Blooded"; Exo – "Don't Fight the Feeling"; Somi – "Dumb Dumb"; Hyuna – "I'm Not Cool"; Itzy – "In the Morning"; Twice – "Kura Kura"; Lisa – "Lalisa"; Rosé – "On the Ground"; Aespa – "Savage"; IU – "Lilac"; Itzy – "Loco"; CL – "Lover Like Me"; Hikaru Utada – "One Last Kiss"; Hyuna & Dawn – "Ping Pong"; Seventeen – "Rock with You"; Tokyo Jihen – "Whiteout"; Sunmi – "You Can't Sit with Us"

==== 2022 ====
List of Chinese and overseas winners

Winner (Chinese)	Winner (Overseas)
JJ Lin – "JJ20" (7千3百多天); BoA & Liu Yuxin —– "Better"; Kelly Yu – "Hedgehog" (刺猬); Li Ronghao & A-Mei – "Equivalence Relation" (对等关系); Lala Hsu – "Gei" (给); Zhou Shen – "Guang District" (光字片); Faye Wong – "Windy On the Way Home" (归途有风); Cai Xukun – "Hug Me"; Faye – "Farewell Love" (诀爱); Sandee Chan – "Bondage" (捆缚); Ann – "All About You" (没有人写歌给你过吧); Khalil Fong – "Look Closer" (清楚点); Tia Ray – "Rising Lady" (她们的名字); G.E.M. – "The Sky" (天空没有极限); Chyi Chin – "The Memory Thief" (偷回忆的人); JJ Lin – "Unchained" (无拘); Joker Xue – "Countless" (无数); A-Lin – "Best Friend" (挚友); Jay Chou – "Greatest Works of Art" (最伟大的作品); Wu Qing-feng – "Fragments d'un Discours Amoureux" (......恋人絮语) (feat. Karena Lam)	NCT 127 – "2 Baddies"; Seulgi – "28 Reasons"; NCT Dream – "Beatbox"; Mark – "Child"; Le Sserafim – "Fearless"; Red Velvet – "Feel My Rhythm"; Aespa – "Girls"; Sunmi – "Heart Burn"; Seventeen – "Hot"; NewJeans – "Hype Boy"; Chen – "Last Scene"; Ive – "Love Dive"; Hyuna – "Nabillera"; Got7 – "Nanana"; Blackpink – "Pink Venom"; Nayeon – "Pop!"; Kenshi Yonezu – "Pop Song"; BigBang – "Still Life"; (G)I-dle – "Tomboy"; Kep1er – "Wa Da Da"

==== 2023 ====
List of Chinese and overseas winners

Winner (Chinese)	Winner (Overseas)
William Chan – "Storm" (暴风); Joker Xue – "Worship" (崇拜); Zhou Zhennan – "F.F.F"; Kelly Yu – "Why Bother" (何必); David Tao – "Serves You Right" (活该); Jason Zhang & Zhang Bichen – "Under the Light' (坚如磐石); Zhang Bichen – "Cage" (笼); Zhou Shen – "Humans Are –" (人是_); Lay Zhang – "Right Back"; Huang Qishan & Curley Gao – "Like Mother, Like Daughter" (是妈妈是女儿); Faith Yang – "Can't Say It" (说不出口) (feat. Wu Bai); Jolin Tsai – "Someday, Somewhere"; Faye – "Only Love" (唯爱); Mayday – "Song For You" (为你写下这首情歌); Jackson Wang – "Why Why Why"; Yoga Lin – "Wordless Groans" (我只是平凡却直拗爱着你的人); Jacky Cheung – "Another Ten Years" (又十年); JJ Lin – "Dust and Ashes" (愿与愁); Coco Lee – "Battle Song" (战歌); Liu Yuxin – "#63EBE9"	Aespa – "Better Things"; NCT Dream – "Broken Melodies"; Itzy – "Cake"; NCT 127 – "Fact Check"; BSS – "Fighting" (feat. Lee Young-ji); Jisoo – "Flower"; Doyoung – "Here With Me"; Ive – "I Am"; Hwasa – "I Love My Body"; Lee Chae-yeon – "Knock"; Bae Suzy – "Ordinary Days"; (G)I-dle – "Queencard"; Stray Kids – "S-Class"; Twice – "Set Me Free"; Jung Kook – "Seven" (feat. Latto); Kenshi Yonezu – "Spinning Globe"; Seventeen – "Super"; NewJeans – "Super Shy"; Blackpink – "The Girls"; Le Sserafim – "Unforgiven" (feat. Nile Rodgers)

==== 2024 ====
List of Chinese and overseas winners

Winner (Chinese)	Winner (Overseas)
Karen Mok – "I Miss You" (被我弄丢的你); Khalil Fong – "Twenty Three" (才二十三); Shan Yichun – "Duō hǎo de guāng yīn" (多少的光阴); JJ Lin – "Shut Up" (绝不绝); Li Ronghao – "The Other Side" (另一端); Angela Zhang – "Mù sè huí xiǎng" (暮色回响); Wang Yibo – "Spectator" (旁观者); Lala Hsu – "Confusing" (扑朔); Eric Chou – "Youth" (青春要用几行诗来写); Liu Yuxin – "Reality"; Cai Xukun – "Ride Or Die" (至死不渝); Tia Ray – "River Flow" (如河); Tanya Chua – "Learn to Live Again" (善良的我们); Lay Zhang – "Step"; Yu Yan – "War"; Waa Wei – "Na Mo Miss You" (我在纽约打电话给你); Zhou Shen – "Little Bliss" (小美满); Huang Qishan – "Xiao Xia" (小霞); David Tao – "Shining Star" (星心); Jackson Yee – "A Tapestry Of A Legendary Land" (只此青绿)	Aimer – "800"; Nayeon – "ABCD"; Rosé & Bruno Mars – "APT."; Suho – "Cheese" (feat. Wendy); Red Velvet – "Cosmic"; Le Sserafim – "Easy"; Bibi & Jackson Wang – "Feeling Lucky"; Riize – "Love 119"; IU – "Love Wins All"; Illit – "Magnetic"; Jennie – "Mantra"; Hwasa – "Na"; G-Dragon – "Power"; Lisa – "Rockstar"; Nmixx – "See That?"; Jaehyun – "Smoke"; NewJeans – "Supernatural"; Aespa – "Supernova"; Zerobaseone – "Sweat"; XG – "Woke Up"

==== 2025 ====
List of winners
- Yeji – "Air"
- Kun – "Deadman"
- Jin – "Don't Say You Love Me"
- G-Dragon – "Drama"
- Jisoo – "Earthquake"
- XG – "Gala"
- Minnie – "Her"
- Le Sserafim – "Hot"
- Wang Yibo – "I Am Not Here"
- Kenshi Yonezu – "Iris Out"
- Blackpink – "Jump"
- Lay Zhang – "Kai Tian" (开天)
- Jennie – "Like Jennie"
- Yuqi – "M.O."
- Rosé – "Number One Girl"
- Aespa – "Rich Man"
- JJ Lin – "Turn Of A Page"
- Babymonster – "We Go Up"
- Ive – "XOXZ"
- Treasure – "Yellow"

== People's Choice Awards ==
Winners are listed below for the 2021, 2022, 2023, 2024, and 2025 award ceremonies.

=== 2021 ===
Rank	Winner (Chinese)	Winner (Overseas)
1st	Lay Zhang – East	Exo – Don't Fight the Feeling
2nd	Joker Xue – Extraterrestrial	Rosé – R
3rd	Cai Xukun – Lost (迷)	Baekhyun – Bambi
4th	Teens In Time – Utopia I • Suzaku (乌托邦1•朱雀)	D.O. – Empathy
5th	Jason Zhang – You Deserve Better	Kenshi Yonezu – "Pale Blue"
6th	Liu Yuxin – "Of Course"	Kai – "Mmmh"
7th	Mao Buyi – Lonely Planet (幼鸟指南)	Hyuna – I'm Not Cool
8th	The9 – MatriX (虚实X境)	Hyuna & Dawn – "Ping Pong"
9th	Jackson Wang & JJ Lin – "Should've Let Go" (過)	Lisa – Lalisa
10th	WayV – Kick Back	Aespa – Savage

=== 2022 ===
Rank	Winner (Chinese)	Winner (Overseas)
1st	Yan Haoxiang – "Y"	Hyuna – Nabillera
2nd	BoA & Liu Yuxin – "Better"	(G)I-dle – I Never Die
3rd	Liu Yuxin – Xanadu	D.O. – "Bite"
4th	Cai Xukun – "Hug Me" (抱我)	Chen – Last Scene
5th	Jay Chou – Greatest Works of Art	Blackpink – Born Pink
6th	Teens In Time – Utopia III (乌托邦lll · 侠)	Seventeen – Face the Sun
7th	Jackson Wang – Magic Man	NCT 127 – 2 Baddies
8th	Lay Zhang – West	Stray Kids – Maxident
9th	Joker Xue – Countless	IU – Pieces
10th	JJ Lin – "JJ20" (7千3百多天)	Ive – Love Dive

=== 2023 ===
Rank	Winner (Chinese)	Winner (Overseas)
1st	Coco Lee – "Battle Song"	(G)I-dle – I Feel
2nd	WayV – Phantom	Seventeen – FML
3rd	Lay Zhang – "Pokémon Party" (宝可梦派对)	BSS – Second Wind
4th	JJ Lin – Happily, Painfully After (重拾_快乐)	Jisoo – Me
5th	Zhou Shen – "Humans Are –" (人是_)	Baekhyun – "Hello"
6th	Zhang Bichen – "Cage" (笼)	Kenshi Yonezu – "Spinning Globe"
7th	Mao Buyi – "Stars" (凡星)	Exo – Exist
8th	Esther Yu – Esther	Vernon – "Black Eye"
9th	Jackson Wang – "Why Why Why"	Aespa – My World
10th	Zhou Zhennan – "F.F.F"	Kai – Rover

=== 2024 ===
Rank	Winner (Chinese)	Winner (Overseas)
1st	Lay Zhang – Step	Jennie – "Mantra"
2nd	Yan Haoxiang – Scary Movie I: Gaze	Lisa – "Rockstar"
3rd	Xiao Zhan – Us (我们)	Woozi – "What Kind of Future" (어떤 미래)
4th	JJ Lin – "Shut Up" (绝不绝)	Ten – Ten
5th	Jackson Yee – "A Tapestry Of A Legendary Land" (只此青绿)	Wendy – Wish You Hell
6th	Yuqi – "One"	Baekhyun – Hello, World
7th	Teens in Time – "Dream" (梦)	Jaehyun – J
8th	Mao Buyi – The Inner Venture (冒险精神)	Chanyeol – Blackout
9th	Joker Xue – "AI"	Yuqi – Yuq1
10th	Zhou Shen – Shenself	Jimin – Muse

=== 2025 ===
Rank	Winner
1st	Zi Yu – "Too Deep"
2nd	Tian Xuning – "Guang Yan" (光焰)
3rd	Aespa – Rich Man
4th	Jackson Yee – Keystone (楔石)
5th	Jackson Wang – Magic Man 2
6th	Baekhyun – Essence of Reverie
7th	Rosé – Rosie
8th	Blackpink – "Jump"
9th	Jennie – Ruby
10th	Lay Zhang – Rock the Heavenly Palace

== Most awarded ==
The following artists have received 10 or more awards, including awards from both the jury and people's choice categories.

Artist	Awards
JJ Lin	18
Lay Zhang	16
Seventeen	14
Aespa	13
Liu Yuxin	11
Jackson Wang	11
Blackpink	10
