= Phantom (EP) =

- Digital album cover

EP by WayV
- Released: December 28, 2022
- Genres: Mandopop; R&B; hip hop
- Length: 28:44
- Languages: Mandarin; English
- Labels: Label V; SM; Dreamus
- Producers: Jinbyjin; Mike Daley; Mitchell Owens; Connor McDonough; Alyssa Ayaka Ichinose; MinGtion; LDN Noise; Adrian McKinnon; Jun Min-ho; Lee Jong-han; Ryan S. Jhun; David "Dwilly" Wilson

WayV chronology
Kick Back (2021)	Phantom (2022)	On My Youth (2023)

NCT chronology
Candy (2022)	Phantom (2022)	Perfume (2023)

Singles from Phantom
- 1. "Phantom" Released: December 28, 2022

Phantom is the fourth extended play (EP) by Chinese boy band WayV with The Phantom of the Opera-inspired lead single of the same name. It was released by Label V and SM Entertainment on December 28, 2022. Consisting of six new songs and two bonus tracks that fall mostly in R&B and hip hop with influences from trap and classical music, the album saw participation from frequent collaborators, namely Adrian McKinnon, LDN Noise, Mike Daley, Mitchell Owens, Ryan S. Jhun as well as first collaboration with the McDonough brothers of Before You Exit. Released almost two years from their previous EP, Phantom marks the group's first album release as a sextet, following suspension of Lucas in August 2021. WayV was set to embark on an eponymous global fanmeeting tour to support the album, with stops including Seoul, Manila, and Bangkok.

== Background and release ==
Following the release of their third EP, Kick Back, in March 2021, WayV were focused on sub-unit activities. The first sub-unit consisting Kun and Xiaojun released the pop-ballad single "Back to You" in June 2021, while Ten and Yangyang released the hip-hop single "Low Low" in August. The third sub-unit consisting Lucas and Hendery that had been scheduled to release the single "Jalapeño" in the same month was canceled due to Lucas' cheating and gaslighting controversy. He was then suspended from any promotional activities. In December 2021, WayV members participated in NCT's third studio album, Universe, by recording the English song "Miracle" as a quintet: Winwin was away in China after establishing a personal studio to pursue an acting career.

On November 22, 2022, WayV posted a teaser image announcing the release of their fourth EP, Phantom, on December 9, after nearly two years from their previous EP. The image showed only six silhouettes, confirming member Lucas's absence in the EP, making it their first album release as a sextet. The release was later postponed due to the national mourning period following the passing of former president of China Jiang Zemin. On December 8, the group announced December 28 as the new release date. A short music video for the b-side track "Diamonds Only" was released ahead of the release on December 22. A short music video for "Good Life" and a live clip for "Broken Love" were also released on January 9 and 16, 2023, respectively.

== Composition and lyrics ==
The EP opens with the eponymous lead single "Phantom", a trap hip-hop based dance-pop song with string sounds and a chorus overlaid with Gregorian chants. Co-composed by frequent collaborator, Adrian McKinnon, the lyrics use masks as the fundamental lyrical motif, describing adversity and suffering as Phantom as well as expressing the will to overcome instead of being swayed by them. The following song "Diamonds Only" is a progressive R&B hip-hop song, with lyrics equating long-cherished dreams and love with shining and precious diamonds. The third track "Good Life" is a mid-tempo R&B, produced by the McDonough brothers of the American pop rock band Before You Exit. It tells a story about moving towards a better life. The song is followed by the ballad song "Broken Love" which likens a past love story with a jigsaw puzzle that can't be put together. The fifth song "Bounce Back" is dance-pop track with minimal instrumental that continues the sad love story from the group's previous songs, "Say It", "Come Back", and "Unbreakable". The following song "Try My Luck" is a dance track that samples Mozart's "Requiem (Dies irae)", prefacing it with an air-raid siren. The EP is then closed by two previously released sub-unit songs as bonus tracks: "Back to You", a delicate yet robust ballad with melancholy trumpet and chimes, and the summery up-tempo hip-hop dance track "Low Low".

== Promotion ==
=== Singles ===
The music video of the lead single "Phantom" was released at the same day as the album on December 28, 2022. It features elements from Andrew Lloyd Webber's The Phantom of the Opera, such as candelabras, masks and broken chandeliers, as well as Game of Thrones-inspired sword-covered throne. Divyansha Dongre of Rolling Stone India described "Phantom" as a "fine addition" to WayV's discography that "perfectly accentuates the group's vocal tones" and features an "evocative" choreography. The song debuted at number sixteen on Chinese TME UNI chart.

=== Live performances ===
To commemorate the release, WayV held a special live broadcast, titled WayV "Phantom" Countdown, on December 28. A pretaped performance of "Phantom" was also broadcast on JTBC's Music Universe K-909 on the same day. WayV performed "Phantom" along with their old songs "Love Talk" and "Take Off" at SM Entertainment's yearly online concert, SMCU Palace at Kwangya. The group also performed the English version of "Phantom" without Winwin in various South Korean music shows, namely M Countdown, Music Bank, Show! Music Core, and Inkigayo.

=== Fanmeeting tour ===
On January 10, 2023, WayV announced that they would embark on an eponymous global fanmeeting tour, starting with two shows at Kyung Hee University's Grand Peace Palace in Seoul on February 11. Beside performing songs from Phantom, the group also performed their previous songs, such as "Kick Back", "Dream Launch", "Action Figure", "Love Talk", and "Nectar". The fanmeeting featured playful corners and games, as well as SM Dance Medley, featuring NCT Dream's "Candy", Shinee's "Sherlock (Clue + Note)", and Aespa's "Illusion".

==== Tour dates ====
List of fanmeetings, showing specific tour date, city, country and venue
Date	City	Country	Venue	Ref.
February 11, 2023 (Day)	Seoul	South Korea	Kyunghee University Peace Hall; Beyond Live (Note: Night only.)	
February 11, 2023 (Night)	Seoul	South Korea	Kyunghee University Peace Hall; Beyond Live	
March 26, 2023	Manila	Philippines	Araneta Coliseum	
April 1, 2023	Bangkok	Thailand	Thunder Dome	
April 2, 2023	Bangkok	Thailand	Thunder Dome	
April 29, 2023	Jakarta	Indonesia	Indonesia Convention Exhibition	
May 6, 2023	Yokohama (Note: Under title WayV Japan Event 2023 "The First Vision")	Japan	Pia Arena MM	
May 7, 2023	Yokohama	Japan	Pia Arena MM	
May 27, 2023	Hong Kong	China	KITEC Star Hall	
June 2, 2023	Singapore		The Star Theatre	
June 8, 2023	London	United Kingdom	Eventim Apollo	
June 11, 2023	Paris	France	La Seine Musicale	
August 12, 2023	Macau	China	Broadway Theater	
August 13, 2023	Macau	China	Broadway Theater	

== Commercial performance ==
Upon its release, Phantom continued WayV's success on South Korean Circle Chart by sitting at number one on the chart for the second time in a row and ranked at number fourteen on the monthly chart with 99,019 copies sold. The album also debuted at number four on Oricon's physical album chart with 9,337 copies sold and number five on Billboard Japan Hot Albums.

== Track listing ==
Phantom track listing
No.	Title	Lyrics	Music	Arrangement	Length
1.	"Phantom"	Pan Yanting	Jinbyjin; Karen Poole; Sondre Mulongo Nystrøm; Farida Benounis; Adrian McKinnon	Jinbyjin	3:47
2.	"Diamonds Only"	Lin Xinye	Mike Daley; Mitchell Owens; Tiyon "TC" Mack; Deez	Daley; Owens	3:29
3.	"Good Life"	Zhou Weijie	Connor McDonough; Riley McDonough; Toby McDonough; Castle	C. McDonough	3:13
4.	"Broken Love" (Chinese: 时间拼图; pinyin: Shíjiān Pīntú; lit. 'Time Jigsaw Puzzle')	Pan	David Simon; Alyssa Ayaka Ichinose; ron	Ichinose; MinGtion	4:04
5.	"Bounce Back"	Pan	Greg Bonnick; Hayden Chapman; McKinnon	LDN Noise; McKinnon	3:38
6.	"Try My Luck"	Zhou	Daley; Owens; Michael "TruPopGod" Jiminez; Mckinnon	Daley; Owens	3:21
7.	"Back to You" (Chinese: 这时烟火; pinyin: Zhèshí Yānhuǒ; lit. 'This Moment's Fireworks') (Bonus track; sung by Kun and Xiaojun)	Xiaohan	Jin Min-ho	Jin; Lee Jong-han	4:12
8.	"Low Low" (Bonus track; sung by Ten and Yangyang)	Ryan S. Jhun; Sorana; Paris Carney; David "Dwilly" Wilson	Jhun; Sorana; Carney; Dwilly	Jhun; Dwilly	2:57
Total length:					28:44

== Charts ==
=== Weekly charts ===
Weekly chart performance for Phantom
Chart (2022–2023)	Peak position
Croatian International Albums (HDU)	33
Hungarian Albums (MAHASZ)	32
Japanese Albums (Oricon)	4
Japanese Combined Albums (Oricon)	5
Japanese Hot Albums (Billboard Japan)	5
South Korean Albums (Circle)	5

=== Monthly charts ===
Monthly chart performance for Phantom
Chart (2022–2023)	Peak position
Japanese Albums (Oricon)	27
South Korean Albums (Circle)	13
