= On My Youth =

- Digital album cover

Studio album by WayV
- Released: November 1, 2023
- Recorded: 2021–2023
- Genres: Mandopop; hip hop; R&B; trap
- Length: 33:38
- Languages: Mandarin; English
- Labels: Label V; SM; Dreamus

WayV chronology
Phantom (2022)	On My Youth (2023)	Give Me That (2024)

NCT chronology
Fact Check (2023)	On My Youth (2023)	Be There for Me (2023)

Singles from On My Youth
- 1. "On My Youth" Released: November 1, 2023

On My Youth is the second studio album by the Chinese boy band WayV. It was released digitally on November 1, 2023, and physically on November 8, 2023, by Label V and SM Entertainment. It consists of ten songs, including the English version of the title track. Member Kun also participated in lyric writing for the track "Be Alright".

== Background and release ==
In May 2023, SM Entertainment announced that Lucas, who had been suspended from the WayV since 2021, would be departing from NCT and WayV to pursue his solo endeavors, officially turning WayV into a sextet. From August to September 2023, WayV joined NCT in their three-day stadium concerts in South Korea and Japan, titled NCT Nation: To The World. On October 16, 2023, WayV announced that they would release their second studio album, On My Youth, on November 8, eleven months since their latest and fourth extended play (EP), Phantom. The album consists of ten tracks and was released on streaming platforms on November 1.

In an interview with USA Today, member YangYang explained that "The album's diverse track range also allowed the members to challenge themselves. […] They tried different genres they hadn't previously done, widening the scope of WayV's abilities."

== Promotion ==
=== Single ===
WayV released the teaser video for the title track "On My Youth" on October 31, while the song was released along with the album the next day. A performance video of "On My Youth" (English ver.) was uploaded to the group's YouTube channel on November 9, 2023. The song debuted at number 86 on the Chinese TME UNI chart.

=== Showcase tour ===
On October 24, 2023, WayV announced that they would embark on an eponymous showcase tour to support the album in four cities in China. The group subsequently added a stop in Shanghai and sold out the tour once the tickets were on sale two days later. On November 9, the ticketing for another additional stop in Wuhan was opened and sold out.

==== Tour dates ====
List of fanmeetings, showing specific tour date, city, country and venue
Date	City	Country	Venue	Ref.
November 1, 2023	Shanghai	China	Jing'an Sports Center Gymnasium	
November 5, 2023	Chengdu	China	Huaxi LIVE-528M Space	
November 8, 2023	Beijing	China	Beijing Exhibition Hall Theater	
November 12, 2023	Guangzhou	China	Asian Games City Comprehensive Stadium	
November 15, 2023	Suzhou	China	Dushu Lake Gymnasium	
November 17, 2023	Wuhan	China	Wugang Sports Center	

== Commercial performance ==
On My Youth debuted on the South Korean Circle Chart at number four with 329,290 copies sold and eventually at number eight in the monthly chart. The album also entered top five on the Japan Oricon and Billboard Hot Album charts.

== Track listing ==
On My Youth track listing
No.	Title	Lyrics	Music	Arrangement	Length
1.	"On My Youth" (Chinese: 遗憾效应; pinyin: Yíhàn Xiàoyìng; lit. 'Regret Effect')	Pan Yanting	Peter Wallevik; Daniel Davidsen; Mich Hansen; Janée "Jin Jin" Bennett; Bobii Lewis; Wayne Hector; Rick Bridges	PhD	3:32
2.	"Poppin' Love" (Chinese: 心动预告; pinyin: Xīndòng Yùgào; lit. 'Heartbeat Notice')	Pan	Ben Samama; Sean Fischer	Fischer	3:05
3.	"Ain't No Thang"	Pan	Greg Bonnick; Hayden Chapman; Justin Starling; Miles Barker	LDN Noise	3:00
4.	"No One But You"	Arys Chien	Ninos Hanna; Hampus Nerge; Tom Wiklund		3:36
5.	"Invincible" (Chinese: 极限; pinyin: Jíxiàn; lit. 'Limit')	Tomo Kurt	Bonnick; Chapman; Jeffrey the Kiddd; Robbie Jay	LDN Noise	3:29
6.	"Rodeo" (Chinese: 冒险行动; pinyin: Màoxiǎn Xíngdòng; lit. 'Adventurous Action' (performed by Winwin, Hendery and Yangyang)	Pan	Bonnick; Chapman; Starling	LDN Noise	2:37
7.	"Moonlight" (Chinese: 新月; pinyin: Xīnyuè)	Pan	Chapman; Bonnick; The Kidd; Sevn Dayz; Tay Jasper	LDN Noise	3:34
8.	"Lighthouse" (Chinese: 心之所向; pinyin: Xīn Zhī Suǒxiàng; lit. 'Where Heart Is' (performed by Kun, Ten, and Xiaojun)	Xiaohan	MinGtion; Andrew Choi; Nermin Harambašić	MinGtion	3:40
9.	"Be Alright" (Chinese: 未来电台; pinyin: Wèilái Diàntái; lit. 'Radio of The future')	Pan; Kun	Chapman; Bonnick; The Kiddd; Sevn Dayz	LDN Noise	3:27
10.	"On My Youth" (English ver.)	Bennett; Lewis; Hector; Bridges	Wallevik; Davidsen; Hansen; Bennett; Lewis; Hector; Bridges	PhD	3:32
Total length:					33:38

== Charts ==
=== Weekly ===
Weekly chart performance for On My Youth
Chart (2023)	Peak position
Japanese Albums (Oricon)	5
Japan Hot Albums (Billboard Japan)	4
South Korean Albums (Gaon)	4

=== Monthly charts ===
Monthly chart performancefor On My Youth
Chart (November 2023)	Position
South Korean Albums (Gaon)	8

=== Year-end charts ===
Year-end chart performancefor On My Youth
Chart (2023)	Position
South Korean Albums (Gaon)	65

== Certifications ==
Certifications for On My Youth
Region	Certification	Certified units/sales
South Korea (KMCA)	Platinum	250,000^{^}
^{^} Shipments figures based on certification alone.

== Release history ==
Release history for On My Youth
Region	Date	Format	Label
Various	November 1, 2023	Download; streaming	Label V
South Korea	November 8, 2023	CD	Label V; SM Entertainment
