= Take Over the Moon =

2019 EP by WayV

- Digital album cover

EP by WayV
- Released: October 29, 2019
- Recorded: 2019
- Studio: Doobdoob (Seoul); SM Blue Cup (Seoul); SM Yellow Tail (Seoul); Sound POOL (Seoul)
- Genre: Mandopop; hip hop; electropop; trap; R&B
- Length: 21:05 (Take Over the Moon); 26:30 (Sequel)
- Language: Mandarin; English
- Label: Label V; SM; Dreamus
- Producer: Lee Soo-man

WayV chronology
Take Off (2019)	Take Over the Moon (2019)	Awaken the World (2020)

NCT chronology
We Boom (2019)	Take Over the Moon (2019)	The Dream (2020)

Special edition cover
- Take Over The Moon - Sequel cover

Singles from Take Over the Moon
- 1. "Moonwalk" Released: October 29, 2019; 2. "Love Talk" Released: November 5, 2019

Take Over the Moon is the second extended play by the Chinese boy band WayV. It was released on October 29, 2019, by Label V and SM Entertainment, with Dreamus as the South Korean distributor and Owhat as the distributor for China. Consisting of six songs that fall mostly on R&B and hip-hop genres with influence from trap and electropop, the album features participation from songwriters and production teams, such as Moonshine, Adrian Mckinnon, Yoo Young-jin, LDN Noise, and others. Members Hendery and Yangyang also participated in writing lyrics for the first time. Upon its release, the album marked the group's debut on Billboard Heatseekers Albums and Gaon Album Chart.

To promote the album, the group released a digital single of an English version of "Love Talk" on November 5, 2019, which immediately earned number three position on Billboard Digital Song Sales. They also did their first performance in South Korea by performing the lead single "Moonwalk" on several television music programs and went on a promotional tour to three countries in Asia.

The special version of the album titled Take Over the Moon - Sequel was released physically on March 13, 2020, by SM and Dreamus. It features two additional tracks, the English version of "Love Talk" and a monologue track. The album earned the top three position on Gaon Album Chart.

== Background and release ==
=== Take Over The Moon ===
After releasing their first extended play Take Off, WayV released a symbol image and a schedule for their second album Take Over the Moon on October 22, 2019. Mysterious and dream-like teaser photos of each member were released each day throughout their social media accounts leading up to the release of the album and its lead single "Moonwalk". The album was released digitally and physically on October 29 by Label V and SM Entertainment with Owhat as the distributor for China and Dreamus for South Korea.

An English version of the track "Love Talk" and its music video were released as a digital single a week later on November 5.

=== Take Over The Moon - Sequel ===
On March 20, WayV released a video teaser for the special version of the album titled Take Over the Moon - Sequel. Composed of six songs from the original tracklist, the album also contains two additional tracks, the English version of "Love Talk" and a narration track "WayV.oice #1". The album is only available in physical form and was released by SM Entertainment and Dreamus on March 30, 2020.

== Composition ==
=== Take Over The Moon ===
Take Over the Moon is opened by the lead single “Moonwalk” which is stylistically a sonic adventure soundtrack for the accompanying music video, beginning with a soft melody, then turning into a propulsive electropop song that layers harmonizing ad-libs beneath impactful raps. Brassy horns, atmospheric synths, and trap beats drive much of the tune, but a hard-rock-infused instrumental bridge arrives before the sweeping finale. The second song “Yeah Yeah Yeah” is an energetic song that harmonizes the trap source with R&B code, and the bass distortion creates grandeur, expressing WayV's passion for a stage. The song is followed by “Love Talk” that features the group singing and rapping seductively over a melody with old-school R&B vibes as it flits over sleek, tinny percussion, which evokes trap and Latin pop elements. The fourth track “King of Hearts” saw first participation in lyrical writing by members Hendery and Yangyang in the group's discography. It is a mid-tempo song based on R&B hip-hop that has a soft yet sorrowful mood, performed by members Winwin, Lucas, Hendery, and Yangyang. The song is followed by “Face to Face”, an outstanding ballad song performed by members Kun, Ten, and Xiaojun, led by a piano melody. The album is then closed by “We go nanana", a funky and cheerful teen pop song that also features lyrics by Hendery and Yangyang.

=== Take Over The Moon - Sequel ===
Following the release of the special version of the album on March 30, 2020, two tracks were added to the original 6-track release. The first track is an English version of "Love Talk" with lyrics written by Adrian Mckinnon and Ebenezer Fabiyi. The second track is "WayV.oice #1", a narration track of the members reading their gratitude message for fans accompanied by music by minGtion.

== Singles and promotion ==
=== Singles ===
Released on October 29, 2019, the music video of the lead single “Moonwalk” takes WayV on an interstellar journey. The group's performance lives up to the song's title, and the music video sees WayV's members moonwalking their way through high-intensity choreography as they travel to their final destination. The song debuted and peaked at number twenty-three on Billboard World Digital Song Sales.

An English version of “Love Talk” was released digitally on November 5. The song is the group's first English single, meant to show the love from WayV towards their international fans. The single was released alongside a music video that has the seven members of WayV charismatically staring down the camera as they perform the smooth tune. It debuted at number three on Billboard World Digital Song Sales, while it earned number two on QQ Music Weekly Digital Sales and certified with a Double Gold for surpassing sales of 500,000 yuan.

=== Live performances ===
WayV had their first comeback stage for the album Take Over the Moon during MBC Music's Show Champion on October 30 where they performed “Moonwalk”, marking their first performance in Korea. It was followed by a performance on SBS MTV's The Show on November 5.

The group then went on a promotional tour titled Section#1_We Are Your Vision to five cities in three countries, Wuhan, Shenzhen, China, Seoul, and Bangkok, spanning over five days between November 23 to December 28, 2019. They performed “Moonwalk”, “Love Talk”, “Face to Face”, and “King of Hearts” from Take Over the Moon, and also songs from their first EP Take Off.

== Commercial performance ==
Upon its release, Take Over the Moon claimed its number one iTunes position in 16 regions. The album also became WayV's debut on Billboard Heatseekers Albums and Gaon Album Chart by ranking at number twenty-four and five, respectively. It eventually ranked at number twelve on Gaon Monthly Album Chart with sales over 31,000 copies.

Only released physically in March 2020, the special version of the album Take Over the Moon – Sequel ranked at number three on Gaon Album Chart and sold more than 24,000 copies in its first month.

== Track listing ==
Take Over the Moon track listing
No.	Title	Lyrics	Music	Arrangement	Length
1.	"Moonwalk" (天选之城; Tiān Xuǎn Zhī Chéng; 'City Chosen by the Heavens')	Matthew Yen	Jonatan Gusmark (Moonshine); Ludvig Evers (Moonshine); Adrian McKinnon; Jeremy "Tay" Jasper	Moonshine; Yoo Young-jin	3:43
2.	"Yeah Yeah Yeah" (黑夜日出; Hēiyè Rìchū; 'Sunrise at Night')	Arys Chien	Mike Daley; Mitchell Owens; Jeff Lewis; Bianca Atterberry	Daley; Owens	3:18
3.	"Love Talk" (秘语; Mì Yǔ; 'Secret Language')	Lin Xinye	LDN Noise; McKinnon; Ebenezer Olaoluwa Fabiyi	LDN Noise	3:53
4.	"King of Hearts" (心心相瘾; Xīnxīn Xiāng Yǐn; 'Heart to Heart Addiction') (performed by Winwin, Lucas, Hendery and Yangyang)	Pan Yanting; Hendery; Yangyang	Daniel "Obi" Klein; Charlotte Taft; Andreas Öberg	Klein	3:18
5.	"Face to Face" (面对面; Miànduìmiàn) (performed by Kun, Ten and Xiaojun)	Xiaohan	Frederik Tao Nordsø Schjoldan; Clarence Coffee Jr.; Conor Maynard	Schjoldan; Lee Joo-hyoung (MonoTree)	3:27
6.	"We go nanana" (幸福遇见; Xìngfú Yùjiàn; 'Happy Meeting')	Pan; Hendery; Yangyang	Erik Lidbom; Seo Jeong-jin (Melodesign); Kim Doo-hyeon (Melodesign)	Lidbom	3:26
Total length:					21:05

Take Over the Moon - Sequel track listing
No.	Title	Lyrics	Music	Arrangement	Length
7.	"Love Talk" (English version)	McKinnon; Fabiyi	LDN Noise; McKinnon; Fabiyi	LDN Noise	3:53
8.	"WayV.oice #1" (Narrated by members of WayV)		minGtion (ADC Music)		1:32
Total length:					26:30

== Charts ==
Chart performance for Take Over the Moon
Chart (2019–2020)	Peak position	
Chart (2019–2020)	Normal ver.	Sequel
French Digital Albums (SNEP)	88	–
South Korean Albums (Gaon)	5	3
UK Album Downloads (OCC)	76	–
US Heatseekers Albums (Billboard)	24	–
US World Albums (Billboard)	12	–

== Release history ==
Release history for Take Over the Moon
Album	Region	Date	Format	Label
Take Over the Moon	China	October 29, 2019	CD; download; streaming	Label V; Owhat
Take Over the Moon	South Korea	October 29, 2019	CD; download; streaming	Label V; SM Entertainment; Dreamus
Take Over the Moon	Various	October 29, 2019	CD; download; streaming	Label V; SM Entertainment; Dreamus
Take Over the Moon	Thailand	January 15, 2020	CD	Label V; SM Entertainment; SM True
Take Over the Moon - Sequel	South Korea	March 13, 2020	CD	Label V; SM Entertainment; Dreamus
