= Renegade (single album) =

- Digital cover

Single album by Lucas
- Released: 1 April 2024
- Genres: Pop; hip hop; rock; reggae
- Length: 9:13
- Language: English
- Labels: SM; Kakao
- Producers: Ronny Svendsen; Pizzapunk; Gingerbread; Bangers & Ca$h

Singles from Renegade
- 1. "Renegade" Released: 1 April 2024

Renegade is the debut single album by Hong Kong rapper Lucas, released on 1 April 2024, by SM Entertainment and distributed by Kakao Entertainment. The single album consists of three songs, including the lead single of the same name. Renegade charted in South Korea at number thirteen on the Circle Album Chart.

== Background and release ==
In 2018, Lucas debuted as a member of South Korean boy band NCT, before joining the band's Chinese sub-unit WayV and debuting with the single album The Vision in 2019. Later in 2019, Lucas also joined K-pop supergroup SuperM. In August 2021, Lucas halted promotions amid controversies relating to his personal life, and in May 2023 Lucas's agency, SM Entertainment, announced that he would be departing NCT and WayV to pursue solo indeavours. In early 2024, Lucas addressed his controversies in a two-part documentary series entitled Freeze, and opened new social media accounts in preparation for upcoming solo activities.

On 8 March 2024, JTBC News reported that Lucas would be making his solo debut in April, with SM Entertainment confirming as such later that day. Three days later, SM officially announced that Renegade, a single album containing three English songs including the lead single of the same name, would be released on 1 April. Renegade was released on 1 April 2024 along with the lead single of the same name, and its two music videos: "Plan A", which depicted the rapper performing the song at a press conference before transforming into a mouse, and "Plan B", a more choreography-focused clip showing Lucas performing the song on an airport runway.

== Composition ==
Renegade contains three tracks. The single album's title track is a rock and hip hop influenced song with lyrics about making "a change for the better and an ambition to walk his way without hesitation". "Dip It Low" is a hip hop track with deep bass and breathy vocals. The final track, "Crushing on You", is reggae-inspired.

== Commercial performance ==
Renegade peaked at number thirteen on South Korea's Circle Album Chart for the week ending 6 April 2024, selling 25,897 copies in its first week. On the monthly chart, Renegade peaked at number 31. As of May 2024, Renegade has sold 31,961 copies in South Korea.

== Track listing ==
Track listing and credits adapted from the single album's liner notes.

Renegade track listing
No.	Title	Lyrics	Music	Arrangement	Length
1.	"Renegade"	Anne Judith Wik; Bobii Lewis; Nermin Harambasic	Ronny Svendsen; Adrian Thesen; Wik; Lewis; Harambasic	Svendsen; Pizzapunk	3:13
2.	"Dip It Low"	Young Chance; Justin Starling	Chance; Starling; Barry Cohen	Gingerbread	2:56
3.	"Crushing on You"	Kristian Ottestad	Ottestad; Harry Sommerdahl; Fabian Torsson	Bangers & Ca$h	3:02
Total length:					9:13

== Charts ==
=== Weekly charts ===
Weekly chart performance for Renegade
Chart (2024)	Peak position
South Korean Albums (Circle)	13

=== Monthly charts ===
Monthly chart performance for Renegade
Chart (2024)	Position
South Korean Albums (Circle)	31

== Release history ==
Release history for Renegade
Region	Date	Format	Label
South Korea	1 April 2024	CD	SM; Kakao
Various	1 April 2024	Digital download; streaming	SM; Kakao
