= Factcheck (disambiguation) =

Factcheck or variants may refer to:

- Fact-checking, the process of verifying the factual accuracy of questioned reporting and statements
- FactCheck.org, a nonprofit website
- Fact Check (album), by NCT 127, 2023
