= Awaken the World =

- Digital album cover

Studio album by WayV
- Released: June 9, 2020
- Recorded: 2019–2020
- Genres: Mandopop; hip hop; R&B; trap
- Length: 33:12
- Language: Mandarin
- Labels: Label V; SM; Dreamus

WayV chronology
Take Over the Moon (2019)	Awaken the World (2020)	Kick Back (2021)

NCT chronology
Reload (2020)	Awaken the World (2020)	NCT 2020 Resonance (2020)

Singles from Awaken the World
- 1. "Turn Back Time" Released: June 9, 2020; 2. "Bad Alive (English Version)" Released: July 29, 2020

Awaken the World is the first studio album by the Chinese boy band WayV. It was released digitally on June 9, 2020, and physically on June 18, 2020, by Label V and SM Entertainment, with Dreamus as the South Korean distributor and Owhat as the distributor for China. A full-length release that consists of ten songs that fall mostly in the hip-hop and R&B genres with influences from synth-pop. Awaken the World saw the participation of various songwriters and production teams that have worked with SM previously, namely Moonshine, Tay Jasper, Adrian McKinnon, Mike Daley, Mitchell Owens, Deez, Dsign Music, Cazzi Opeia, Ryan S. Jhun, Vedo, LDN Noise, MZMC, and others. Members Hendery and Yangyang also participated in lyric writing for some of the album tracks.

Upon its release, Awaken the World attained commercial success in China and South Korea, earning the group top-three entry on both Tencent Music's UNI Chart and the Gaon Album Chart, as well as their third entry on the Billboard World Albums Chart. It was also WayV's first release to enter the Oricon Albums Chart, peaking at number nineteen. To promote the album, the group performed the lead single "Turn Back Time" on several South Korean television music programs, with an accompanied Korean version of the song released separately on June 18, 2020. Subsequently, the group released an English version of the track "Bad Alive" as a digital single on June 29 which managed to rank at number one on QQ Music Daily Digital Sales chart and earned Gold certification hours after it was released.

== Background and release ==
Following the release of their second extended play Take Over the Moon and English version of "Love Talk", WayV teased their upcoming album by performing a mashup of their new songs "Bad Alive" and "Turn Back Time" in their May 3 Beyond LIVE, an online-dedicated live concert series jointly organized by SM Entertainment and Naver. The group then announced they would release their first full-length album Awaken the World on June 9. On May 30, a teaser video was released on the group's Twitter account which shows a new version of WayV's logo, as well as an URL to a web-based interactive game that fans could visit and play on mobile to "find clues from WayV and rescue them". A video trailer and photos of each member were released one by one as part of the game's reward. The music video teaser for "Turn Back Time" was uploaded on the group's official YouTube channel on June 8, 2020.

Due to issues regarding their outfits, the album was released digitally as scheduled on June 9, while the release of the physical album was delayed to June 18. The music video for the lead single "Turn Back Time" was eventually released on June 10. The group also released a Korean version of "Turn Back Time" digitally on June 18.

On July 24, WayV announced they would release an English version of the track "Bad Alive" as a digital single. Preceded by series of photos and video teasers, the song was released digitally on June 29 at 17:00 CST while the music video was released at midnight.

== Composition ==
The album opens with the lead single "Turn Back Time", an urban trap song that stands out with powerful bass and beat that seems to be speeding that, embodying the group's ambition to progress towards a larger world stage. Swedish composer team Moonshine, who participated in composing the group's previous lead single "Moonwalk", also involved in this track. The following track "Bad Alive", composed by American producer Mike Daley, is mainly composed of arpeggio and 808 drums, full of strong energy. Irregular trap drums and a siren sound overlay the dynamic bassline and melody, giving a sense of power. The domineering lyrics show a confident attitude. The third track "Unbreakable" is an urban mid-tempo song with a majestic and mysterious sound added to the traditional music style. Although the song contains trap elements, it also contains chords influenced by Michael Jackson to provide greater musical depth. It is the final installment of a trilogy with "Say It" and "Come Back" from WayV's first mini-album Take Off, describing the state of mind of a man who's been hurt by love. The album continues with "After Midnight", a synth-pop song with a calm and downbeat style. The harmony of the powerful funk guitar and the arpeggio of synth-wave lead the dynamics of the whole song. The lyrics describe dwelling on the romance of spending time alone with someone special after a party, well-suited for the time after midnight. The fifth track "Interlude: Awaken the World" represents the overall concept of the album as a whole. Combining a grand and dreamy piano and string sound, it marries Eastern and Western concepts. The strong & intense rhythm of the latter half of the song embodies the group's resolution to advance even further from now on.

The next half of Awaken the World starts with "Only Human", a hip-hop song based on the arpeggio element of the acoustic guitar and the low synth sound. The lyrics show that in ordinary life, even if there are moments of uneasiness and fatigue, there is also a feeling of hopefulness toward the future. Member Hendery personally participated in writing the lyrics, making the song more complete. The track is followed by "Domino", an R&B pop song that combines rhythmic melody and rhythmic beat that fully attracts the ear. The lyrics express the loss of control when people are in love. This unstoppable relationship between the two parties is likened to a game of domino. Full of dancing bass lines and unique elements, the eighth track "Up From Here" is a light song that reflects the refreshing feeling that matches the theme of love. The lyrics are about the fluttering & happy feeling of friendship growing into romantic love. Including rap lines written by members Hendery and Yangyang, the ninth track "Electric Hearts" is a song that highlights the vivid drumbeat rhythm and synth sound of electronic music. It shows the group in a wider range, trying a new musical concept. "As long as you are in love, you can communicate with each other's soul even if you are far apart." With the theme of luminous energy fluctuations connecting the two people, it highlights the emotional lyrics that tell the feelings felt through such fluctuations. The album is closed by "Stand By Me", an urban pop song that combines the repeated performance of acoustic guitar and group singing. It is a healing song full of joy and hope. Hendery also participated in the creation of rap lyrics. Through the lyrics like "Culture From WayV", he expressed the friendship of the members of WayV. It highlights gaining strength from relying on and comforting each other, becoming one another's strength.

== Singles and promotion ==
=== Singles ===
Hours after Awaken The World was released, the music video of the lead single "Turn Back Time" was released on June 9 after a delay. The song achieved an increasing digital performance on local music charts comparing to the group's previous releases, remaining at the top spot for seven consecutive days and was certified with a Gold Medal on QQ Music Popularity Chart. It also ranked at number three on UNI Chart (previously known as Yo! Bang), a weekly music ranking by Tencent Music that covers data from three China's biggest music platforms: QQ Music, Kugou, and Kuwo, becoming the group's first entry to the top three of the chart. Internationally, the song ranked at number twelve on Billboard World Digital Songs. On June 18, the group released a Korean version of "Turn Back Time" digitally with an accompanied similar music video with lyrics by Kang Eun-jeong, Oh Min-joo, and Park Seong-hee.

An English language version of the track "Bad Alive" and its music video were released on June 29 with lyrics by Wilbart "Vedo" McCoy and Pan Yan Ting. Compared to the original, "Bad Alive (English Ver.)" expresses a story of a bad guy who falls in love and WayV's tough charisma. The single managed to rank at number one on QQ Music Daily Digital Sales chart and earned Gold certification hours after it was released. It eventually ranked at number six on the weekly chart. The song subsequently debuted at number twelve on Billboard World Digital Songs.

=== Live performances ===
Due to travel restrictions related to the COVID-19 pandemic, the album was primarily promoted in South Korea, where the group is currently based. Promotions for the album started with the group's first performance for "Turn Back Time" as WayV The Stage through their official Weibo and YouTube account on June 11, 2020. A day later, the group performed their lead single on the South Korean music show Music Bank, followed by Show! Music Core and The Show. To commemorate the release of the album, the group did a special live broadcast titled Awaken WayV's World via V Live on June 17.

To promote "Bad Alive (English Ver.)", WayV performed the song on various South Korean music shows, namely Music Bank, Show! Music Core, Inkigayo, The Show, and Show Champion. The group also did a special live broadcast titled Bad Alive: WayV ZONE via V Live on August 3 to celebrate the release of the song.

== Critical reception ==
Professional ratings for Awaken the World
Review scores
Source	Rating
AllMusic	4/5 stars

Giving Awaken the World four stars out of five, Neil Z. Yeung of AllMusic described the album as "a lively blend of R&B-inspired smoothness, trap-influenced edge, and synth-washed pop polish". He praised the group's effortless vocal delivery and lush harmonies, as well as their ability to elevate the varied production provided by a team featuring the likes of Moonshine, Dsign Music, LDN Noise, Jack & Coke, and more. To close his review, Yeung said the album is "one of the best entries in the NCT catalog" and "WayV delivered a confident and addictive full-length debut that more-seasoned groups rarely achieve on their second or even third attempts".

== Commercial performance ==
Shortly after its release, Awaken the World claimed its number one iTunes position in 21 countries and the entire album tracks charted on the top ten QQ Music Soaring Songs chart. The album went on to debut at number three on Gaon Album Chart for the week of June 20, 2020. It eventually earned the first top ten debut for the group on the monthly chart by appearing at number three for the month of June 2020, with a cumulative sales of 86,292 copies. The album also appeared at number thirty-three on Billboard Japan Hot Albums, making Awaken the World the group's first release to chart in Japanese music charts. The physical album subsequently peaked at number nineteen on Oricon Weekly Albums Chart and debuted at number nine on Billboard World Albums chart. As of October 18, 2020, the album has sold over 280,000 copies worldwide.

== Track listing ==
Awaken the World track listing
No.	Title	Lyrics	Music	Arrangement	Length
1.	"Turn Back Time" (Chinese: 超时空 回; pinyin: Chāoshíkōng Huí; lit. 'Transcending Time and Space')	Matthew Yen	Jonatan Gusmark (Moonshine); Ludvig Evers (Moonshine); Jeremy "Tay" Jasper; Adrian McKinnon	Moonshine; Yoo Young-jin	3:38
2.	"Bad Alive"	Pan Yanting	Mike Daley; Mitchell Owens; Deez; Wilbart "Vedo" McCoy III	Daley; Owens; Deez	3:49
3.	"Unbreakable" (Chinese: 执迷; pinyin: Zhímí; lit. 'Obsessed')	Pan	Ronny Vidar Svendsen; Nermin Harambašić; Deez; McCoy III; Cazzi Opeia (Sunshine)	Svendsen; Deez	3:37
4.	"After Midnight"	Liu Yuan	Harold "Alawn" Philippon; Taylor Jones; Ryan S. Jhun	Philippon	3:29
5.	"Interlude: Awaken the World"		Squar (Blur)	Squar	0:53
6.	"Only Human" (performed by Winwin, Lucas, Hendery, and Yangyang)	Pan; Hendery; Yangyang	Greg Bonnick; Hayden Chapman; Jasper; Dylan Huling	LDN Noise	3:32
7.	"Domino" (Chinese: 多米诺; pinyin: Duōmǐnuò)	Lin Xinye	E. Kidd Bogart; Jakob Hazell; Svante Halldin; Tiyon "TC" Mack; Rick Bridges; Linnea Södahl	Bogart; Hazell; Halldin; TC	3:16
8.	"Up from Here" (Chinese: 浪漫发酵; pinyin: Làngmàn Fājiào; lit. 'Romantic Fermentation')	Pan	Candace Sosa; Johan Gustafsson; Pontus Petersson (The Kennel); Jordan "DJ Swivel" Young	Sosa; Gustafsson; Petersson; DJ Swivel	4:01
9.	"Electric Hearts"	Pan; Hendery; Yangyang	Nicky van der Lugt Melsert; McKinnon; Jasper; Ryan S. Jhun; MZMC	Lugt Melsert; McKinnon; Jasper; Jhun; MZMC	3:25
10.	"Stand by Me"	DeerJenny; Hendery	Henrik Nordenback; Christian Fast; Didrik Thott	Nordenback	3:32
Total length:					33:12

"Turn Back Time" (Korean version) digital single track listing
No.	Title	Lyrics	Music	Arrangement	Length
1.	"Turn Back Time" (Korean version)	Kang Eun-jeong; Oh Min-joo; Park Seong-hee	Gusmark; Evers; Jasper; McKinnon	Moonshine; Yoo	3:38
Total length:					3:38

"Bad Alive" (English version) digital single track listing
No.	Title	Lyrics	Music	Arrangement	Length
1.	"Bad Alive" (English version)	McCoy III; Pan	Daley; Owens; Deez; McCoy III	Daley; Owens; Deez	3:49
Total length:					3:49

== Credits and personnel ==
Credits are adapted from NetEase Music and Xiami.

- Deez – vocal directing (track 1-3)
- Andrew Choi – vocal directing (track 4), background vocals (track 4)
- MQ – vocal directing (track 6), background vocals (track 6)
- Maxx Song (ICONIC SOUNDS) – vocal directing (track 7-8), digital editing (track 7-8), Pro Tools operator (track 7-8)
- WayV – vocals, background vocals
  - Kun – vocals, background vocals (track 6,8,10)
  - Ten – vocals, background vocals (track 7-10)
  - Winwin – vocals, background vocals (track 6,8)
  - Lucas – vocals
  - Xiaojun – vocals, background vocals (track 6-10)
  - Hendery – vocals
  - Yangyang – vocals, background vocals (track 6,8)
- Jangmoon – background vocals (track 1-3,10), vocal director (track 9-10)
- Wilbart "Vedo" McCoy III – background vocals (track 2)
- Jeremy "Tay" Jasper – background vocals (track 9)
- Adrian McKinnon – background vocals (track 9)
- Lee Ji-hong – recording (track 1-2,)
- Kang Eun-ji – recording (track 1-2), digital editing (track 2,4,7-8,10)
- Eugene Kwon – recording (track 2-3,10)
- Jennifer Hong – recording (track 4)
- Min Sung-su – recording (track 4,9)
- Jang Woo-young – recording (track 3,6), digital editing (track 3,6,9)
- Lee Min-kyu – recording (track 7-8), mixing engineer (track 2-4,7-10), mixing (track 5)
- No Min-ji – recording (track 7-8), mixing engineer (track 1,6)
- Min Sung-su – recording (track 9)
- Jung Ho-jin – recording (track 10)
- On Sung-yun – recording (track 10)
- Kim Chul-soon – mixing (track 1,7-8)
- Jin NamKoong – mixing (track 2,4,9)
- Kim Han-goo – mixing (track 6)
- Jung Eui-seok – mixing (track 3,10)

=== Locations ===
Recording

- LYVIN Studio
- doobdoob Studio
- GaeNaRi Sound
- Big Shot Studio
- Yellow Tail Studio
- sound POOL Studios

Mixing

- Yellow Tail Studio
- Blue Ocean Studio
- Big Shot Studio
- Concert Hall Studio
- sound POOL Studios
- Blue Cup Studio

== Accolades ==
Year-end lists accolades for Awaken the World
Critic/Publication	List	Work	Rank	Ref.
Refinery29	Music Saved 2020: The 29 Best Songs Of The Year	"Bad Alive"	—N/a	
MTV	The Best K-Pop B-sides of 2020	"Domino"	14	
BuzzFeed	Best K-Pop Songs of 2020	"Turn Back Time" (Korean version)	12	

== Charts ==
=== Weekly charts ===
Weekly chart performance for Awaken the World
Chart (2020)	Peak position
Hungarian Albums (MAHASZ)	22
Japanese Albums (Oricon)	19
Japan Hot Albums (Billboard Japan)	33
South Korean Albums (Gaon)	3
UK Album Downloads (Official Charts)	55
US Top Current Albums	81
US World Albums (Billboard)	9

=== Monthly charts ===
Monthly chart performance for Awaken the World
Chart (October 2020)	Position
South Korean Albums (Gaon)	10

=== Year-end charts ===
Year-end chart performance for Awaken the World
Chart (2020)	Position
South Korean Albums (Gaon)	78

== Release history ==
Release history for Awaken the World
Region	Date	Format	Label
China	June 9, 2020	Download; streaming	Label V
Various	June 9, 2020	Download; streaming	Label V; SM Entertainment
China	June 18, 2020	CD	Label V; Owhat
South Korea	June 18, 2020	CD	Label V; SM Entertainment; Dreamus
Various	June 18, 2020	CD	Label V; SM Entertainment; Dreamus
