= Be There for Me =

2023 single album by NCT 127

- Digital cover

Single album by NCT 127
- Released: December 22, 2023
- Genres: R&B; pop
- Length: 11:35
- Language: Korean
- Label: SM

NCT 127 chronology
Fact Check (2023)	Be There for Me (2023)	Walk (2024)

NCT chronology
On My Youth (2023)	Be There for Me (2023)	Dream()scape (2024)

Singles from Be There for Me
- 1. "Be There for Me" Released: December 22, 2023

Be There for Me is the first single album by South Korean boy band NCT 127. It was released on December 22, 2023, by SM Entertainment and includes three songs, including the lead single of the same name.

== Background and release ==
On December 7, 2023, it was reported that NCT 127 would release a winter-themed digital single titled "Be There for Me" on December 22. On December 8, the band announced via social media that the physical version of the single would be released on December 27.

== Composition ==
Title track "Be There for Me" is a pop R&B song that incorporates an organ, piano, and brass instruments. The lyrics are written like a letter, conveying one's intention to be near a person who is far away. "Home Alone" is a mid-tempo pop song with synths whose lyrics express feeling of wanting to stay home alone rather than going out in the cold winter weather. "White Lie" is an R&B ballad that compares one's inability to express their feelings for another person to telling a white lie. Members Taeyong and Mark participated in writing the lyrics for "White Lie".

== Commercial performance ==
The single album Be There for Me debuted at number one on South Korea's weekly Circle Album Chart, while the song "Be There for Me" debuted at number 53 on the Circle Digital Chart. It peaked at number one the following week, before descending to number 100 the week after. The album also ranked first on China's QQ Music and KuGou digital album sales charts.

== Track listing ==
Be There for Me track listing
No.	Title	Lyrics	Music	Arrangement	Length
1.	"Be There for Me"	Kenzie	Andrew Bazzi, Jackson Morgan, Landon Sears, Manifest, Kevin White, Mike Woods, Styalz Fuego, Rudy Sandapa, MZMC	Kevin White, Mike Woods, Styalz Fuego, Rudy Sandapa, MZMC	3:38
2.	"Home Alone" (나 홀로 집에)	Yoo Jae-eun (Jam Factory)	Sean Davidson, Andre Davidson, Dewain Whitmore Jr., Koda	The Monarch	3:46
3.	"White Lie" (하얀 거짓말)	Hwang Yu-bin (XYXX), Taeyong, Mark	9rota, Nmore, Gabriel Brandes, Taeyong, Mark	9rota, Nmore	3:57
Total length:					11:21

== Charts ==
=== Weekly charts ===
Weekly chart performance for Be There for Me
Chart (2023–2024)	Peak position
Japanese Albums (Oricon)	9
Japanese Combined Albums (Oricon)	11
Japan Top Singles Sales (Billboard Japan)	4
South Korean Albums (Circle)	1
UK Singles Downloads (OCC)	13
UK Singles Sales (OCC)	16

=== Monthly charts ===
Monthly chart performance for Be There for Me
Chart (2023–2024)	Position
Japanese Albums (Oricon)	29
South Korean Albums (Circle)	2

=== Year-end charts ===
Year-end chart performance for Be There for Me
Chart (2023)	Position
South Korean Albums (Circle)	40

== Certifications ==
Certifications for Be There for Me
Region	Certification	Certified units/sales
South Korea (KMCA)	3× Platinum	750,000^{^}
^{^} Shipments figures based on certification alone.

== Release history ==
Release history and formats for Be There for Me
Region	Date	Format	Label	Ref.
Various	December 22, 2023	Digital download, streaming	SM Entertainment, Kakao	
South Korea	December 27, 2023	CD	SM Entertainment, Kakao	
United States	January 26, 2024	CD	SM Entertainment, Universal Music Group	
