= Kick Back (EP) =

- Digital and Stranger version cover

EP by WayV
- Released: March 10, 2021
- Recorded: 2021
- Genre: Mandopop; R&B; k-pop; hip hop
- Length: 21:07
- Language: Mandarin; Korean
- Label: Label V; SM; Dreamus
- Producer: Alawn; Yoo Young-jin; Simon Petrén; Bobii Lewis; Ebenezer Olaoluwa Fabiyi; Magnus Klausen; Seann Bowe (Joombas); Jun Suk Choi

WayV chronology
Awaken the World (2020)	Kick Back (2021)	Phantom (2022)

NCT chronology
Loveholic (2021)	Kick Back (2021)	Hot Sauce (2021)

Singles from Kick Back
- 1. "Kick Back" Released: March 11, 2021

Kick Back is the third extended play by the Chinese boy band WayV with the lead single of the same name. It was released on March 10, 2021, by Label V and SM Entertainment, with Dreamus as the South Korean distributor and Owhat as the distributor for China. Consisting of six songs that fall mostly in the R&B genre with influences from hip-hop and pop, Kick Back featured the participation of various songwriters and production teams that have worked with SM previously, namely Alawn, Jasmine Kara, Bobii Lewis, Ebenezer Fabiyi, Dsign Music, Hyuk Shin, Simon Petrén, Cazzi Opeia, Ryan S. Jhun, and others. It is the final WayV album and overall NCT release to feature Lucas due to his hiatus and eventual departure in 2023.

Upon its release, Kick Back saw an increase in physical sales in South Korea and Japan, peaking at number thirteen on the Oricon Albums Chart and selling more than 200,000 copies in its first month on the Gaon Album Chart. The album eventually earned the group their first certification with a Platinum for selling more than 250,000 copies in South Korea.

== Background and release ==
After releasing their first studio album Awaken the World, WayV for the first time participated in NCT's project NCT 2020 for the rest of 2020 and released the song "月之迷 (Nectar)" to be a part of their albums. On February 23, 2021, WayV announced their upcoming extended play (EP) titled Kick Back was set to be released on March 10. The teaser photos for both versions of the album, Stranger Ver. and Hitchhiker Ver., were then released sequentially for the next two weeks.

== Composition ==
Kick Back opens with the lead single of the same name, a progressive R&B dance song that combines a vibrant vocal and a calm flow of rap. The lyrics convey the message of "gathering together in a secret place that only belongs to us, enjoying freedom, and planning the future together". The following song "Action Figure" is based on brass music whose lyrics tell a story of a main character who is a doll or action figure that feels sad about the restraints of their cold reality, but leaves dreams and hopes for others in their wakes, and perseveres in protecting them. Following on from "Face to Face" from Take Over the Moon, members Kun, Ten, and Xiaojun teamed up again for the song "Horizon", a ballad that conveys the group's gratitude towards their fans. The fourth track is "All For Love", a trap R&B song that recalls the sentimental ambiance of the night. It is followed by "Good Time", a pop song with hip-hop beat with lyrics like, "As long as we're together, all moments are happy." The album is then closed by the Korean version of "Kick Back".

== Singles and promotion ==
=== Singles ===
The music video of the lead single "Kick Back" was released at the same time as the album on March 10, 2021. It peaked at number one on QQ Music Mainland MV chart on March 15. The song also debuted at number seven on Tencent Music's UNI Chart and got the highest paid score for the week. This made WayV the first group breaking into the top ten position on the chart in 2021. The song was used in the collaboration stage mission of Youth With You 3 where Lisa of Blackpink performed with the trainees. A self-made practice video was then released by WayV's member Ten on his Instagram account which racked up more than six million views in just three days.

=== Promotion ===
To commemorate the release of the album, WayV held an online showcase through official international and local channels, such as YouTube, Vlive, and Weibo. The group performed "Kick Back" for the first time as well as other tracks in the album and their previous hits. Before starting their round of promotion in South Korean music shows, it was announced members Winwin and Lucas would be absent during the promotion of the album given they were undergoing quarantine in China for solo schedules. However, the group managed to record a performance of "Kick Back" for the M Countdown broadcast that week. The group continued to promote the song by performing "Kick Back" on The Show and Show Champion, as well as the Korean version on Music Bank, Inkigayo, and Show! Music Core.

== Commercial performance ==
Upon its release, Kick Back achieved number one iTunes position in 25 countries. Following the success of their previous album in Japan, Kick Back made its debut on Oricon Albums Chart and Billboard Japan Hot Albums chart both at number thirty-five, then peaked on the Oricon chart at number thirteen. It also became the group's first number one album on Gaon Album Chart for the week of March 13, 2021. The album eventually sat on the sixth place on the monthly chart for the month of March 2021, with cumulative sales of 226,535 copies. It was the group's biggest Gaon monthly chart debut so far, more than two times of Awaken the World. The album eventually earned the group their first certification with a Platinum for selling more than 250,000 copies in South Korea.

== Accolades ==
Kick Back on year-end lists
Critic/Publication	List	Rank	Ref.
South China Morning Post	25 best K-pop albums of 2021	23	

Awards and nominations for Kick Back and "Kick Back"
Organization	Year	Award	Work	Result	Ref.
Asian Pop Music Awards (Note: Hosted by the Hong Kong Asia Pacific International Group and Sunway Records, the Asian Pop Music Awards bases its winners on "Asian Pop Music Chart" which opened in September 2019.)	2021	Best Dance Performance (Chinese)	"Kick Back"	Won	
Asian Pop Music Awards	2021	Top 20 Albums of the Year (Chinese)	Kick Back	Won	
Asian Pop Music Awards	2021	People's Choice Award	"Kick Back"	Won	

== Track listing ==
Kick Back track listing
No.	Title	Lyrics	Music	Arrangement	Length
1.	"Kick Back" (Chinese: 秘境; pinyin: Mìjìng; lit. 'Secret Place')	Pan Yanting	Harold "Alawn" Philippon; Jasmine Kara; Keynon "KC" Moore; Ryan S. Jhun	Philippon; Yoo Young-jin	3:50
2.	"Action Figure"	Lin Xinye	Bobii Lewis; Ebenezer Olaoluwa Fabiyi; Magnus Klausen; Junny	Lewis; Fabiyi; Klausen	3:19
3.	"Horizon" (Chinese: 天空海; pinyin: Tiānkōng Hǎi; lit. 'Sky and Sea') (performed by Kun, Ten and Xiaojun)	Xiaohan	Hwang Chan-hee; Simon Petrén	Petrén	3:31
4.	"All For Love" (Chinese: 梦尽; pinyin: Mèngjìn; lit. 'End of Dream')	Pan	Hyuk Shin (Joombas); Seann Bowe (Joombas)	Bowe	3:17
5.	"Good Time"	DeerJenny	Choi Jin-suk; Alexander Karlsson; Cazzi Opeia (Sunshine)	Choi	3:20
6.	"Kick Back" (Korean version)	Kim Min-ji	Philippon; Kara; Moore; Jhun	Philippon; Yoo	3:50
Total length:					21:07

== Charts ==
=== Weekly charts ===
Weekly chart performance for Kick Back
Chart (2021)	Peak position
Finnish Physical Albums (Suomen virallinen lista)	8
Hungarian Albums (MAHASZ)	39
Japanese Albums (Oricon)	13
Japan Hot Albums (Billboard Japan)	35
South Korean Albums (Gaon)	1

=== Monthly charts ===
Monthly chart performance for Kick Back
Chart (2021)	Peak position
Japanese Albums (Oricon)	25
South Korean Albums (Gaon)	6

=== Year-end charts ===
Year-end chart performance for Kick Back
Chart (2021)	Position
South Korean Albums (Gaon)	47

== Certifications ==
Certifications for Kick Back
Region	Certification	Certified units/sales
South Korea (KMCA)	Platinum	250,000^{^}
^{^} Shipments figures based on certification alone.

== Release history ==
Release history for Kick Back
Region	Date	Format	Label
China	March 10, 2021	Download; streaming	Label V
Various	March 10, 2021	Download; streaming	Label V; SM Entertainment
China	March 10, 2021	CD	Label V; Owhat
South Korea	March 10, 2021	CD	Label V; SM Entertainment; Dreamus
Various	March 10, 2021	CD	Label V; SM Entertainment; Dreamus
South Korea	March 26, 2021	Kihno	Label V; SM Entertainment
