= Jordan James Reyes =

US musician, songwriter and producer

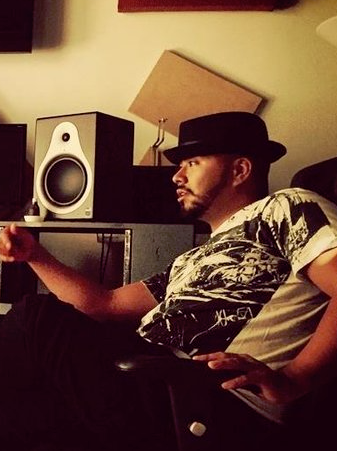
- at Skywave Studios in Hollywood, CA

Background information
- Also known as: Jeordi, Jeordi la Forge
- Born: Jordan James Reyes; October 5, 1986 (age 40); Chicago, Illinois, U.S.
- Genres: Pop, R&B
- Occupation: Songwriter
- Instrument: Piano Guitar
- Years active: 2004 - Present
- Website: www.instagram.com/legendary_jeordi

Jordan James Reyes (born October 5, 1986), known professionally as Jeordi is an American musician, international songwriter and vocal producer. He is an 8-time platinum selling songwriter and held the fourth most played song of the decade in the entire country of Finland (2010-2020). As a vocal producer and songwriter, he has co-written in sessions with many notable artists including Queen Latifah, Rotimi, Adrian Marcel, Krewella and Alex Aiono. Reyes has also contributed his writing to many major label releases worldwide including international artists, Lu Han (former member of K-pop boy group EXO) and both Evelina, Nikee Ankara (Universal Music Group Finland artists). He is also the co-founder of music publishing house Red Matter Recordings.

== Life and career ==
=== Career beginnings ===
Reyes, who is of Filipino descent and native of Uptown, Chicago, began by singing in the church choir. His father was a musician as well and often travelled across the US as a family, with his touring band. Reyes started songwriting and toplining at the University of Illinois at Urbana-Champaign in dorm rooms and started recording his own vocals on top of beats with classmates. His first serious exposure to any kind of renowned recording studio was in 2009 at an impromptu invitation to a few recording/writing sessions in Hollywood, CA. The session included new songwriter Bruno Mars, and steady climbing production team the Stereotypes. Reyes recalls being in awe listening to the quality in writing and lyrics in the demos played. That night he decided to commit to his craft by throwing away his own demos and starting from scratch.

In 2013, Reyes eventually secured an internship with CRUSH music group working on label and administration releases for artists Sia, Fall Out Boy and Travie McCoy. This led to a position at Warner Music Group as a publishing administrator in 2016 working on international licensing. After a year, Reyes was offered his own worldwide publishing deal (coincidentally with Warner Music Group) as a songwriter and left to pursue his dream full time.

=== 2016–present ===
Reyes was mentored for several years by songwriter and producer Henkka “MGI” Lanz, who signed Reyes to his publishing company M-Eazy Music in collaboration with Warner Music Group - Finland. While under MGI's tutelage, Reyes co-wrote many songs, including hits such as Evelina's “Honey," "Sushi," and Nikee Ankara’s "Ootsa Nahny Nikee.”

By 2017–2018, Reyes would co-write 2 original songs for the new Fox Animation franchise "Ice Age 5: Collision Course" film trailers, that would air in the US and Latin Markets. This would open up new opportunities in the world of Film/TV. Sync licensing placements included television shows on MTV, Netflix, Hulu, USA Network, The CW, E! Entertainment, NFL Network, Sky Sports etc.

=== Writing camps ===
In February 2019, Reyes received an invitation to attend Stockholm Songwriting Camp, which was held in Budapest, Hungary. He was the only American resident selected and it would expose him to a new perspective, the global market. He would connect and collaborate with writers/producers from the UK, Germany, Sweden, Ireland, Singapore, Mexico, Hungary and France. That same trip, he would travel to collaborate with producers in Berlin, Vienna and Paris.

Later that year, in November 2019, Reyes would accept another invitation to attend The Woods Norway Songwriting camp held in the English countryside miles from London, United Kingdom. The camp included artists from Germany, Norway, Sweden and of course UK. He later held his own camps in London with many of the musicians from the previous camps. These camps would eventually come full circle with many of those international musicians coming to work with him once he returned to Los Angeles, CA.

=== Asia market ===
By the end of 2019, Reyes attended the KCON convention in LA, which celebrated K-Pop music. While sharing experiences and networking, he would be invited to his first K-pop songwriting camp help in Los Angeles. In May 2020, Reyes landed his first placement in the Asia territories China and Korea, co-writing the hit single "Slow Motion" for artist Lu Han (former member of K-pop boy group EXO). Upon its release, LuHan's album "π-volume.3" exceeded 2,000,000 copies in sales - Ranking first in the QQ music best-seller charts! With this certification, Reyes would achieve certified diamond status for his writing contribution to the hit single.

== Songwriting discography ==
Year	Song	Artist	Album/EP	Details
2008	"Serendipity" "Don't Hate Me" "Get On The Floor"	Zoe Galgiani	Unreleased	Territory: North America Label: Class Act Release Date: Unreleased
2009	"Pushin On"	Sir Diaz	Single	Territory: Europe Label: M.E.R. Release Date: TBD
2009	"Attraction"	Mehdi Decroix	Single	Territory: Europe Label: FC LONEBIRD Release Date: TBD
2010	"Blush"	Krewella	Single	Territory: North America Label: CHI Release Date: TBD
2010	"Used to Be" "Watch Me" feat. JDP	Rotimi	Unreleased	Territory: North America Label: Front Ro Music Group Release Date: TBD
2012	"Wavy" "Love Drunk" "Venom" "Bullseye"	Ellapaige	Unreleased	Territory: Europe Label: UK Release Date: TBD
2014	"Bottle Service" "Night Vision"	Sam Dagher	Single	Territory: Europe Label: Diamond Sound Frequency Release Date: TBD
2014	"Flatline"	Reynard Silva	Single	Territory: North America Label: Nu World Entertainment Inc Release Date: December 18, 2014
2015	"Vuoristorataa"	Evelina	24K	Territory: Europe [Scandinavia] Label: Universal Music Group, M-Eazy Music (Finland) Release Date: May 2015 Certification: Gold
2015	"Honey" feat. Mikael Gabriel	Evelina	24K	Territory: Europe [Scandinavia] Label: Universal Music Group, M-Eazy Music (Finland) Release Date: December 11, 2015 Certification: 8× Platinum #1 IFPI Singles Charts #1 Spotify Top-50 Charts (Finland) #3 Billboard (Finland Digital Songs) #5 iTunes Top Songs Charts (Finland) #4 Most Played Song of the Decade 2010-2020 (Finland)
2016	"Sushi" feat. JVG	Evelina	24K	Territory: Europe [Scandinavia] Label: Universal Music Group, M-Eazy Music (Finland) Release Date: June 28, 2016 Certification: 3× Platinum #1 iTunes Charts (Finland) #2 Spotify Top-50 Charts (Finland) #3 IFPI World Charts (Singles)
2017	"UNITED" feat. Hope	N.E.P.H.E.W.	Single	Territory: North America Label: Grind Mind Global Release Date: January 18, 2017
2017	"Not The One" "Guarantee"	Queen Latifah	Unreleased	Territory: North America Label: ATL Release Date: TBD
2018	"Ootsä Nähny Nikkee"	Nikke Ankara	Ootsä Nähny Nikkee	Territory: Europe [Scandinavia] Label: Universal Music Group, M-Eazy Music (Finland) Release Date: April 27, 2018 Certification: 2× Platinum #3 IFPI Albums Charts
2018	"Look Away"	WILHELM	Unreleased	Territory: Europe Label: Baggpipe Release Date: TBD
2018	"30 Day Grind"	Payroll Giovanni	10 Stack Commandments	Territory: North America Label: BYLUG Entertainment/Def Jam Release Date: December 7, 2018
2018	"Be Who U Are"	Taya Marquis	Single	Territory: North America Label: I'mperfect Release Date: December 7, 2018
2019	"Wait By The Doors"	Dora Hegyi	Unlreleased	Territory: Europe Label: SSC Release Date: TBD
2019	"Company" "Bougie'ful"	Malina Stark	Unreleased	Territory: Europe Label: MB Release Date: TBD
2020	"2 Kids"	Alex Aiono	Single	Territory: North America Label: Become Records Release Date: May 8, 2020
2020	"Slow Motion"	Lu Han	π-volume.3	Territory: Asia Label: Rock Forward Entertainment Release Date: May 27, 2020 Certification: Certified Diamond Status #1 QQ Music Best-seller Charts Total Sales: CHN: 3,009,225
2020	"What Am I Waiting For"	KØLEEN	Single	Territory: Europe Label: Chune Music Release Date: November 20, 2020
2021	"Paint It Black"	View	I Saw The Same Dream Every Night	Territory: Europe [Scandinavia] Label: Sony Music Entertainment (Finland Oy) Release Date: May 21, 2021
2021	"Love U Right"	Inigo Pascual	Options	Territory: Asia Label: Tarsier Records Release Date: June 25, 2021

== TV/Film licensing ==
Year	Song	TV/Film	Details
2016	"New Dawn"	Ice Age 5: Collision Course	US Market - Trailer Studio: 20th Century Fox Release Date: June 19, 2016
2016	"Forever Young"	Ice Age 5: Collision Course	Latin Market - Trailer Studio: 20th Century Fox Release Date: June 19, 2016
2018	"All Hail The Queen"	Crazy Ex-Girlfriend	Territory: North America Network: The CW TV Scene: "The Royal" (Season 3, Episode "Trent?!") Release Date: February 9, 2018
2018	"All Hail The Queen"	Queen of the South	Territory: North America Network: USA Scene: Season 3 Premiere Trailer (1:14-2:00) Release Date: 2018
2018	"Feels Good"	Charmed	Territory: North America Network: The CW Scene: Pilot (Season 1, Episode 1) Air Date: October 14, 2018
2019	"Heavy Hitter"	Very Cavallari	Territory: North America Network: E! Entertainment Scene: "Cabo, Here We Come!" (Season 2, Episode 8) Release Date: April 28, 2019
2019	"Heavy Hitter"	WWE Specials	Territory: North America Network: WWE Scene: New Day Pancake Powered Year Release Date: December 19, 2018
