= Fact Check (album) =

- Digital cover

Studio album by NCT 127
- Released: October 6, 2023
- Genres: R&B; hip hop; soul; dance
- Length: 31:44
- Language: Korean
- Label: SM

NCT 127 chronology
2 Baddies (2022)	Fact Check (2023)	Be There for Me (2023)

NCT chronology
Golden Age (2023)	Fact Check (2023)	On My Youth (2023)

Singles from Fact Check
- 1. "Fact Check" Released: October 6, 2023

Fact Check is the fifth Korean studio album (sixth overall) by South Korean boy band, NCT 127. It was released on October 6, 2023, under SM Entertainment and consists of nine tracks including the lead single of the same name.

== Background and release ==
On August 26, 2023, NCT 127 announced they would be making a comeback during their performance at NCT Nation: To the World. SM Entertainment confirmed the news the next day, announcing their fifth full album's title and release date.

== Promotion ==
To promote the album, it was announced that NCT would be holding a "Night of Festival" to showcase the album following its release. On the same day, the group also held a press conference, to commemorate the album's release. The album was promoted with 8 members as a result of Taeil's injuries sustained in a motorcycle incident.

== Critical reception ==
Rolling Stone gave the album a positive review, writing, "You can hear the recent maturation fill even the smallest corners of Fact Check, which, without departing from their genre-hopping tendencies, is considered and clearly articulated in mood and emotion."

Year-end lists for Fact Check
Critic/Publication	List	Rank	Ref.
Paste	The 20 Best K-pop Albums of 2023	17	

== Commercial performance ==
The day after its release, the album debuted at number one on several real-time music charts, including the Hanteo chart in South Korea, the Line Music chart in Japan, and the QQ Music chart in China.

The album debuted at number one on South Korea's weekly Circle Album Chart. As of the end of 2023, the album has sold over 1.5 million copies in South Korea, making it the twentieth best-selling album of the year. In Japan, the album reached number two on both the Oricon Albums Chart and the Billboard Japan Hot Albums chart.

According to the International Federation of the Phonographic Industry (IFPI)'s Global Music Report for 2023, Fact Check was the fifteenth best-selling album worldwide, having sold 1.9 million units. (Note: The IFPI Global Albums chart ranks, in order, the albums that generated the most money globally across streaming, download, and physical record sales (combined) in a calendar year. The Global Album Sales Chart measures global unit sales across all physical formats, as well as full album downloads.)

== Track listing ==
Fact Check track listing
No.	Title	Lyrics	Music	Arrangement	Length
1.	"Fact Check" (Korean: 불가사의; Hanja: 不可思議; RR: Bulgasaui)	Wutan; Rick Bridges; Na Jeong-ah (153/Joombas)	Omega; Jordan Reyes; Young Chance; Justin Starling	Omega	3:04
2.	"Space" (무중력; Mujungnyeok)	Danke (Lalala Studio)	Omega; Bram Inscore; Andrew Pedersen	Omega; Inscore	3:08
3.	"Parade" (행진; Haengjin)	Lee Na-yun (Jam Factory)	Dwayne "Dem Jointz" Abernathy, Jr.; Cocoa Sarai; K.A.A.N.	Dem Jointz	3:25
4.	"Angel Eyes"	Ellie Suh (153/Joombas); Taeyong; Mark	James "JHart" Abrahart; Jeremy Dussolliet; Johnny Simpson; Jackson Foote; Jack Avery; Jonah Marais; Corbyn Besson; Taeyong; Mark	Foote; Simpson	3:04
5.	"Yacht"	Shin Jin-hye (Jam Factory)	Michael McHenry; Larus Orn Arnarson; Kaine; Peter Fenn; Ray Anthony Smith; Caleb Tyrone Armstrong	DaysOf1993	3:07
6.	"Je Ne Sais Quoi"	Since	Daniel Pattiata; Rico Greene; Ronnie Icon	Hoodie	3:35
7.	"Love Is a Beauty" (별의 시; Byeorui si)	Taeil; Yuhwa; Taeyong; Mark	The Breed; Mizzy Lott; San Yoon; Taeyong; Mark	The Breed; Lott	4:48
8.	"Misty" (소나기; Sonagi)	Kang Eun-jeong; Taeyong; Mark	Charli Taft; Thomas Sardorf; Daniel Obi Klein; Taeyong; Mark	Klein	3:57
9.	"Real Life"	Na Jeong-Ah (153/Joombas)	Corey James Sanders; Abrahart; Sylvester Willy Sivertsen; August Rigo	Sivertsen	3:32
Total length:					31:40

== Charts ==
=== Weekly charts ===
Weekly chart performance for Fact Check
Chart (2023)	Peak position
Australian Albums (ARIA)	9
Belgian Albums (Ultratop Wallonia)	45
Croatian International Albums (HDU)	4
French Albums (SNEP)	45
Greek Albums (IFPI)	17
Japanese Albums (Oricon)	2
Japanese Combined Albums (Oricon)	2
Japanese Hot Albums (Billboard Japan)	2
New Zealand Albums (RMNZ)	22
Portuguese Albums (AFP)	2
South Korean Albums (Circle)	1
Spanish Albums (Promusicae)	57
US Billboard 200	16
US Independent Albums (Billboard)	2
US World Albums (Billboard)	1

=== Monthly charts ===
Monthly chart performance for Fact Check
Chart (2023)	Position
Japanese Albums (Oricon)	6
South Korean Albums (Circle)	4

=== Year-end charts ===
Year-end chart performance for Fact Check
Chart (2023)	Position
Japanese Albums (Oricon)	43
Japanese Hot Albums (Billboard Japan)	40
South Korean Albums (Circle)	20

== Certifications ==
Certifications for Fact Check
Region	Certification	Certified units/sales
Japan (RIAJ)	Gold	100,000^{^}
South Korea (KMCA)	Million	1,000,000^{^}
Summaries
Worldwide (IFPI)	—	1,900,000
^{^} Shipments figures based on certification alone.
