= Xiaojun =

Chinese singer (born 1999)

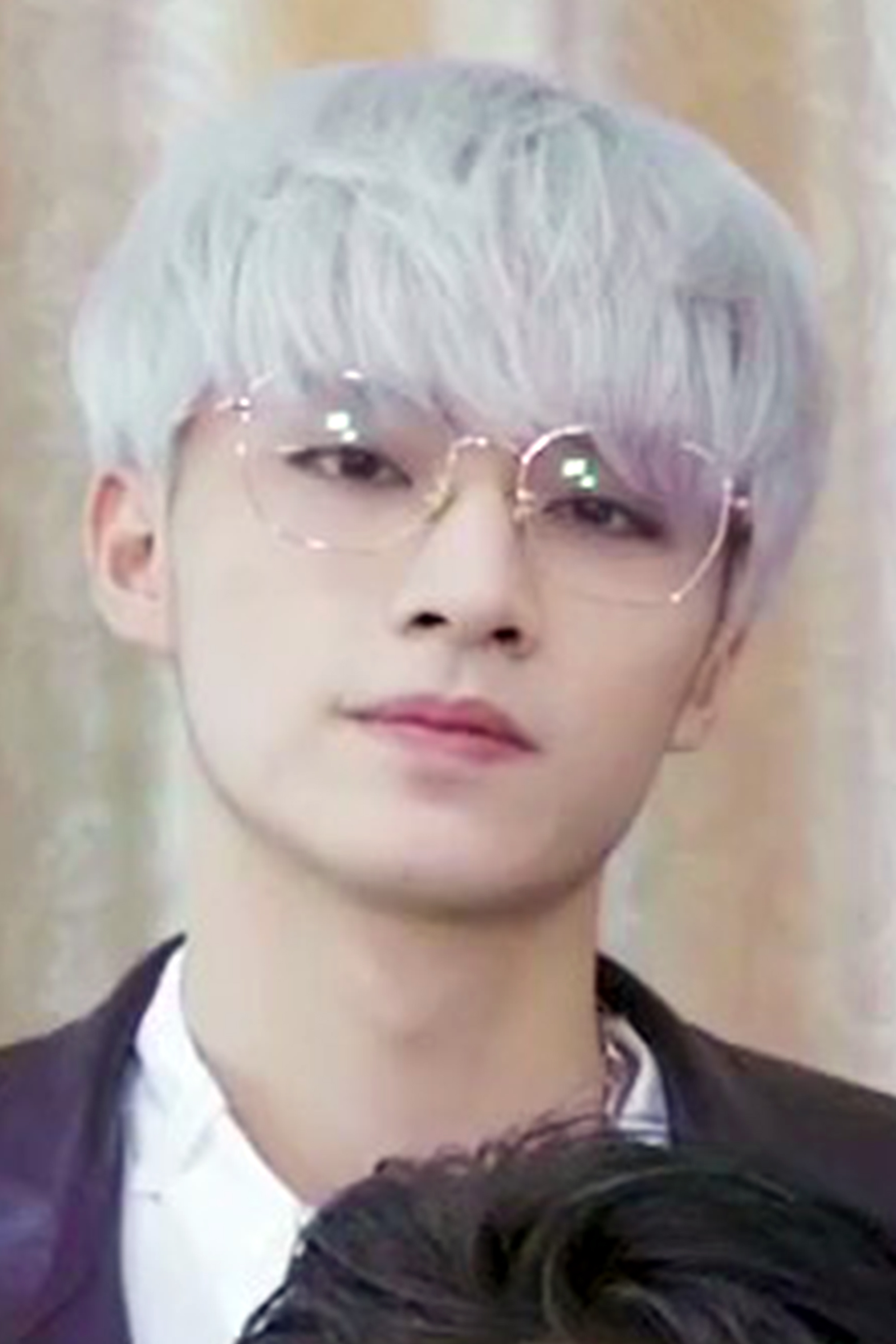
- Xiaojun in 2019
- Born: Xiao Dejun; 8 August 1999 (age 27); Dongguan, Guangdong, China
- Occupation: Singer
- Musical career
- Genres: K-pop; C-pop
- Instrument: Vocals
- Years active: 2015–present
- Labels: SM; Label V; STE
- Member of: NCT; WayV; WayV – Kun & Xiaojun
- Formerly of: SM Rookies

Chinese name
- Traditional Chinese: 肖德俊
- Simplified Chinese: 肖德俊
Transcriptions
Standard Mandarin
- Hanyu Pinyin: Xiāo Déjùn

Xiao Dejun (Chinese: 肖德俊; born 8 August 1999), known professionally as Xiaojun (肖俊; Korean: 샤오쥔), is a Chinese singer. He rose to prominence as a member of the K-pop boy band NCT and its Chinese sub-unit WayV.

== Life and career ==
=== 2015–2018: Pre-debut ===
In 2015, Xiaojun participated in the reality program X-Fire (燃烧吧少年) on Zhejiang Television where he trained to be an idol alongside 15 other trainees. He failed to make the final lineup for the Chinese idol group X Nine. On 3 December 2016, Xiaojun appeared on Our Chinese Heart (中国情), a program on CCTV-4, with his father and brother. There, the three of them performed 父亲写的童文诗 or "A Child's Poem Written By Father". On 17 July 2018, he was introduced as a member of SM Rookies, a pre-debut training team composed of SM trainees who would potentially debut as idol group members, alongside future members Hendery and Yangyang.

=== 2019–present: Debut with NCT, WayV and solo activities ===
In December 2018, Xiaojun was announced to be a part of NCT's China-based unit WayV, managed by Label V. The seven-member unit officially debuted on 17 January 2019, with their debut extended play The Vision. Its lead single "Regular" was the Mandarin remake of "Regular" by NCT 127. In 2020, Xiaojun collaborated with Super Junior-M's Zhou Mi and fellow WayV member Kun on the single "I'll Be There", released on 28 February 2020. In October, Xiaojun made his NCT U debut on the single "Make A Wish (Birthday Song)". Xiaojun debuted in WayV's first sub-unit, WayV-KUN&XIAOJUN on 16 June 2021, with the debut single "Back To You".

Xiaojun released his first extended play (EP), Hey, Somebody, on 26 October 2026, comprising five tracks in English and Chinese.

== Discography ==
=== Extended plays ===
List of extended plays, with selected details, chart positions, and sales
Title	Details	Peak chart positions	Sales
Title	Details	KOR	Sales
Hey, Somebody	Released: 26 October 2026; Labels: SM, Kakao; Formats: CD, digital download, streaming	6	KOR: 77,599

=== Singles ===
==== As lead artist ====
List of singles as lead artist, with year of release, selected chart positions, and associated album
Title	Year	Peak chart positions		Album
Title	Year	CHN	KOR DL	Album
"I'll Be There" (在你身旁) (with Zhou Mi and Kun)	2020	39	—	Non-album singles
"To My Friend" (最佳损友)	2024	—	—	Non-album singles
"Hey, Somebody" (Chinese or English version)	2026	47	7	Hey, Somebody

==== As featured artist ====
List of singles as featured artist, with year of release and associated album
Title	Year	Album
"The Riot" (Ginjo featuring Ten and Xiaojun)	2020	Non-album single

=== Other charted songs ===
List of other charted songs, with year of release, selected chart positions, and associated album
Title	Year	Peak chart positions	Album
Title	Year	KOR DL	Album
"Where You Are" (넌 어디에) (with Ryeowook, Onew, Doyoung, and Chenle)	2022	87	2022 Winter SM Town: SMCU Palace

== Filmography ==
=== Television ===
Year	Title	Role	Ref.
2015	X-Fire (燃烧吧少年)	Contestant	
2016	Our Chinese Heart (中华情)		
2023–2025	The Show	Host	

=== Web series ===
Year	Title	Role	Ref.
2021	Hello, My Youth (歡迎光臨高中生)	Chang Yan	

== Awards and nominations ==
List of awards and nominations, with name of the award, year of ceremony, recipient, category, and result of the nomination
Award	Year	Recipient	Category	Result	Ref.
Weibo Music Awards	2023	Xiaojun and Kun	Recommended Hot Artist Award	Won	
