= WayV =

Chinese boy band

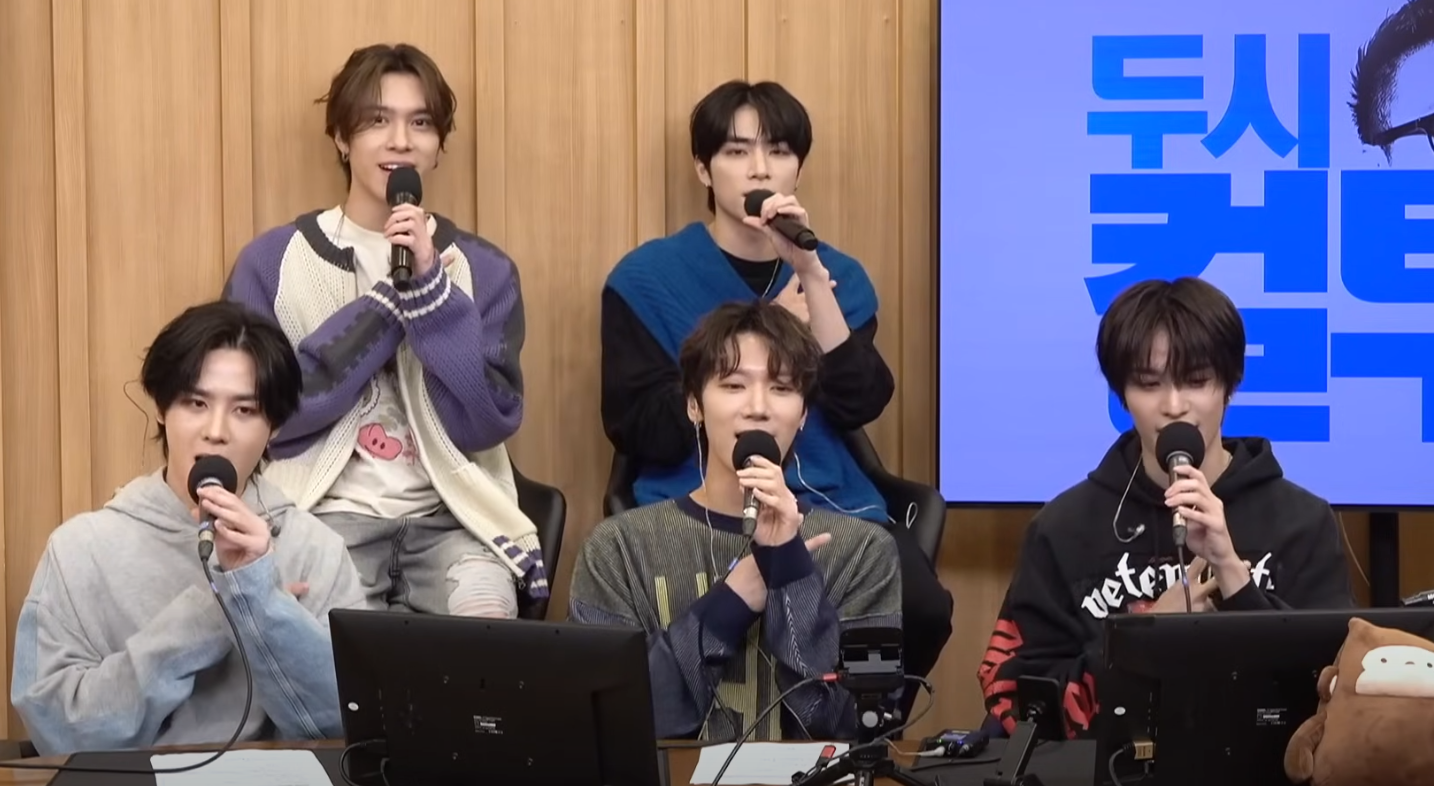
- WayV in November 2024; From left to right, top: Hendery and Xiaojun; From left to right, bottom: Kun, Ten and Yangyang

Background information
- Origin: China
- Genres: C-pop; Mandopop; K-pop; hip hop; R&B
- Years active: 2019–present
- Labels: SM; Label V; Avex Trax
- Spinoffs: WayV – Kun & Xiaojun; WayV – Ten & Yangyang
- Spinoff of: NCT
- Members: Kun; Ten; Xiaojun; Hendery; Yangyang
- Past members: Winwin; Lucas
- Website: smentertainment.com/wayv

WayV (Chinese: 威神V; pinyin: WēiShén V; Korean: 웨이션브이; an acronym for We are your Vision) is a Chinese boy band and the fourth overall sub-unit of the South Korean boy band NCT, managed by SM's Chinese sub-label, Label V. The group is currently composed of Kun, Ten, Xiaojun, Hendery, and Yangyang; Lucas and Winwin were a part of the original lineup but departed in May 2023 and July 2026, respectively. The group debuted on January 17, 2019, with the digital extended play (EP) The Vision. WayV is the only sub-unit whose name does not use "NCT" as a prefix.

WayV has earned accolades from both national and international award ceremonies, including Favorite Asian Artist at the 2020 Mnet Asian Music Awards and Best Dance Performance (Chinese) at the Asian Pop Music Awards for their 2021 single "Kick Back".

== History ==
=== 2016–2018: Pre-debut activities and formation ===
Before joining SM Entertainment, some members were already involved in the entertainment industry. In 2011, Ten participated as a contestant in the Thai TV show Teen Superstar under the name TNT. Xiaojun was a singing contestant on Zhejiang TV's survival program X-Fire in November 2015.

In 2013, Ten was the first member to join the label through an SM Global audition in Bangkok, Thailand. In 2015, Lucas was cast through an SM Global Audition in Hong Kong; in July of the same year, Kun was cast through SM GLOBAL AUDITION in Beijing, China. Winwin was street-cast at his school by an SM casting manager and passed the label's auditions. In February 2016, YangYang passed an audition in Taiwan. Hendery was street-cast in 2015, and Xiaojun was cast in 2018.

All seven members of WayV were originally part of SM Rookies, a pre-debut team of trainees under SM Entertainment. In 2014, Ten, alongside some of his co-members, appeared on the Mnet-produced Exo 90:2014, a show starring labelmates Exo, where they performed to K-pop songs from the 1990s. In April 2016, Kun sang with NCT U in the Chinese version of "Without You" and joined them for the song's promotional stages. Winwin joined as dancer for NCT U's "The 7th Sense" at their first live performance in China at the 16th Music Feng Yun Bang Awards at the same month.

On January 28, 2016, SM founder and producer Lee Soo-man announced plans for a new boy group called NCT to be made up of several different units based in different cities around the world.

Ten debuted with the first unit, the rotational NCT U, on April 9, 2016. Although Kun sung the Chinese version of the NCT U song "Without You" in 2016, he was not considered a member until he and Lucas participated in NCT 2018, a project involving all members of NCT, and promotions of their album Empathy. Winwin debuted as part of the second unit, the Seoul-based NCT 127, on July 10, 2016. On August 13, 2018, SM announced their plan to launch a China-based unit under the project name NCT China.

The formation of WayV was announced through the group's official Weibo account on December 31. The seven members were to include four preexisting NCT members—Kun, Winwin, Ten and Lucas—along with three new members who had just been introduced through SM Rookies earlier that year—Hendery, Xiaojun, and Yangyang. The group was announced to be under SM Entertainment's new China-exclusive label, Label V.

The group was confirmed to be a sub-unit of NCT, although they were not promoted as such until the announcement of NCT 2020. Journalists have theorized that distancing WayV from the NCT label was a result of tense relations between China and South Korea. Despite this, SM CEO Chris Lee acknowledged WayV as NCT's China-based unit since their formation.

=== 2019: Debut, Take Off and Take Over the Moon ===
On January 17, 2019, WayV debuted by releasing their first digital EP The Vision with a Chinese version of NCT 127's "Regular" as the lead single. All three tracks of the EP placed within the top ten on Billboard World Digital Songs. The group debuted at number four on the Billboard Social 50, the best debut on the chart since XXXTentacion in June 2018.

WayV released their first EP Take Off with lead single with the same name on May 9. The EP peaked at number seven on the Billboard World Albums Chart and charted at number one on iTunes album chart in 30 regions. Meanwhile, the single debuted at number two on the QQ Music Weekly Popularity chart.

On October 29, WayV released their second EP, Take Over the Moon, with the title track "Moonwalk". Members Hendery and Yangyang participated in writing lyrics for the first time in the songs "King of Hearts" and "We Go Nanana". The group made their debut on the Billboard Heatseekers Albums and Korean Gaon Album Chart, ranking at number twenty-four and five, respectively. The group had their first comeback stage for the album on MBC Music's Show Champion on October 30, marking their first performance in South Korea. On November 5, the group released an English version of "Love Talk", which debuted and peaked at number three on the Billboard World Digital Song Sales. The song also marked the group's first entry on QQ Music Weekly Digital Sales Chart, ranking at number two. The repackaged version of the album, titled Take Over the Moon: Sequel, was released in 2020 and included the English version of "Love Talk" and the spoken track "WayV.oice #1" on the new track list. The group subsequently went on a promotional tour in China, South Korea, and Thailand.

=== 2020: Awaken the World and NCT 2020 Resonance ===
In 2020, WayV was the second group from SM Entertainment to hold a live online concert, jointly organized by SM Entertainment and Naver as part of the world's first online-dedicated live concert series, Beyond LIVE. The live concert, which was WayV first-ever concert and titled WayV – Beyond the Vision, was held on May 3. The group performed songs from their prior albums, as well as a mashup of "Turn Back Time" and "Bad Alive", two tracks on their first studio album Awaken the World that was set for release five weeks later on June 9, 2020.

Awaken the World was preceded by an online game designed for smartphones, challenging players to unlock teaser images of the individual members. Additionally, individual video teasers of the members were released across different platforms. Both the album's physical edition and the music video of its lead single "Turn Back Time" were released following a delay to remove potential issues with the outfits used in its promotional visual content. Upon its release, WayV earned their first top-three entry on Tencent Music's UNI Chart (previously known as Yo! Bang) and the Gaon Album Chart. The album also peaked at number nine on the Billboard World Albums chart, while "Turn Back Time" ranked at number twelve on the World Digital Song Sales chart. Awaken the World became the group's first release to chart on Japanese music charts, appearing on both Billboard Japan Hot Albums and Oricon Weekly Albums Chart. Subsequently, the group released a Korean version of "Turn Back Time" digitally with an accompanied similar music video. On July 29, an English version of the track "Bad Alive" was released as a digital single. The single ranked at number one on QQ Music's Daily Digital Sales chart and earned Gold certification within hours of its release. It peaked at number six on the platform's weekly chart.

WayV participated in NCT's project NCT 2020, which included members of WayV, the other NCT subunits, and two new members. The group released their album in two parts, with NCT 2020 Resonance Pt. 1 released in October and NCT 2020 Resonance Pt. 2 in November, marking WayV's first official promotion as an NCT subunit and Xiaojun, Hendery, and Yangyang's official induction as NCT members. WayV recorded the song "月之迷 (Nectar)" for the album, which debuted at number twelve on the UNI Chart, while members Lucas and Xiaojun participated in promotion for the album's lead single "Make a Wish (Birthday Song)" promotion.

By the end of the year, WayV received international awards from Mnet Asian Music Awards and Asia Artist Awards and ranked third on the UNI Chart Top 10 Groups of 2020 based on their achievements on the local chart.

=== 2021–2023: Kick Back, Phantom and Lucas' departure ===
On March 10, 2021, WayV released their third EP, Kick Back, with the lead single of the same name. Members Winwin and Lucas were absent during the promotion of the album given they were undergoing quarantine in China for solo schedules. The album became the group's first number one album on the Gaon Album Chart and eventually earned the group their first certification for selling more than 250,000 copies in South Korea. On June 23, WayV released a new song "Everytime" as part of the soundtrack album for Chinese drama Falling Into Your Smile.

WayV members participated in the promotion of NCT's third studio album Universe, released on December 14, 2021. Members Yangyang and Xiaojun participated in promotions for the title song Universe (Let's Play Ball). The group recorded the English song "Miracle" for the album. Lucas and Winwin did not participate in the album, after Lucas had been suspended from any promotional activities due to cheating and gaslighting controversy, and Winwin had established a personal studio in China.

WayV announced to release their fourth EP, Phantom, on December 9, 2022. The group later delayed the release to December 28 following the passing of former president of China Jiang Zemin. Released almost two years from their previous EP, Phantom marks the group's first album release as a sextet. To support the album, WayV embarked on an eponymous global fanmeeting tour, starting with two shows in Seoul on February 11. WayV subsequently held their first solo event in Japan titled "The First Vision" at Pia Arena MM in Kanagawa on May 6–7, 2023. Three days later, SM Entertainment announced that Lucas would be departing from NCT and WayV to pursue his individual endeavors.

=== 2023–2024: On My Youth, Winwin's inactivity, Give Me That, Japanese debut and Frequency ===
In August to September 2023, WayV joined NCT in their three-day stadium concerts in South Korea and Japan, titled NCT Nation: To the World.

WayV released their second studio album, On My Youth, on November 1, 2023, which earned the group their second South Korean Platinum certification after Kick Back. WayV then went onto an eponymous showcase tour in six cities in Mainland China throughout the month.

On June 3, 2024, WayV released their fifth EP Give Me That and the lead single of the same title along its music video both in Chinese and Korean at the same time. Winwin did not participate in the album due to conflicting schedules. The group earned their first music show win on SBS M's The Show eight days after their EP's released.

WayV made their Japanese debut with the release of their first Japanese EP, The Highest, on August 8, 2024. The group will also embarked on their first concert tour, titled 2024 WayV Concert "On the Way", beginning in Nagoya on August 17, 2024. The tour is scheduled to visit various cities across Asia.

On October 28, SM Entertainment announced that WayV's third release of 2024, an EP entitled Frequency, would be released on November 25. It will be released along with the lead single of the same name in both Korean and Mandarin. Winwin again did not participate in the release due to scheduling conflicts.

=== 2025–present: Big Bands, Eternal White and Winwin's departure ===
On June 30, 2025, SM Entertainment announced that WayV's seventh EP, Big Bands, would be released on July 18. On November 17, 2025 SM Entertainment announced that WayV's first special winter EP, Eternal White, would be released on December 8.

On July 8, 2026, SM Entertainment announced that Winwin would be departing from SM Entertainment, NCT, and WayV. The group released their eighth EP, Vision Wings, in August 2026.

== Members ==
=== Current ===
- Kun (钱锟) — leader
- Ten (ชิตพล ลี้ชัยพรกุล/李永钦)
- Xiaojun (肖德俊)
- Hendery (黃冠亨)
- Yangyang (刘扬扬)

=== Former ===
- Winwin (董思成)
- Lucas (黃旭熙)

== Sub-units ==
In June 2021, SM Entertainment formed the group's first sub-unit, WayV – Kun & Xiaojun. The sub-unit debuted by releasing a pop-ballad single album titled "Back to You". In August 17, the second sub-unit, WayV – Ten & Yangyang, debuted with the hip-hop single "Low Low". A third sub-unit, WayV – Lucas & Hendery, was scheduled to debut with a digital single titled "Jalapeño" on August 25, although the project was canceled due to controversy surrounding Lucas' private life.

== Other ventures ==
=== Endorsements ===
WayV has endorsed and collaborated with multiple brands, including Skechers, Carslan, Cigalong Beauty, and Maeil Barista Rules.

=== Philanthropy ===
On July 23, 2020, WayV donated through the China Social Welfare Foundation's charity project to help victims and front-line flood relief workers in Jiangxi and Hunan.

== Artistry ==
=== Influences ===
In the group's interview, WayV stated their musical influences range from Jay Chou to Rihanna, Michael Jackson, Travis Scott, Kendrick Lamar, and Justin Bieber. They also draw inspiration from their labelmates at SM Entertainment, such as Taemin from Shinee for Ten and Exo for Kun and Winwin.

== Discography ==
- Awaken the World (2020)
- On My Youth (2023)

== Concerts and tours ==
Tours

- WayV Fanmeeting Tour "Section#1: We Are Your Vision" (2019)
- WayV Fanmeeting Tour "Phantom" (2023)
- WayV Showcase Tour "On My Youth" (2023)
- WayV Concert Tour "On the Way" (2024)
- WayV Concert Tour "No Way Out" (2025)
- WayV Concert Tour "Born This Way" (2026)

One-off concerts

- WayV – Beyond the Vision (2020)
- WayV Japan 2023 "The First Vision" (2023)

Concert participation

- NCT: Resonance 'Global Wave' (2020)
- SM Town Live "Culture Humanity" (2021)
- SM Town Live 2022: SMCU Express at Kwangya (2022)
- SM Town Live 2022: SMCU Express at Human City Suwon (2022)
- SM Town Live 2022: SMCU Express at Tokyo (2022)
- SM Town Live 2023: SMCU Palace at Kwangya (2023)
- NCT Nation: To The World (2023)
- SM Town Live 2025: The Culture, the Future (2025)

== Filmography ==
=== Reality shows ===
Year	Title	Network	Note(s)	Ref.
2019	Dream Plan (少年威计划)	Youku, YouTube	12 episodes	
2020	WayVision	Seezn, TrueID	Produced in South Korea, 12 episodes	
2021	WayVision 2	Seezn	Produced in South Korea, winter sports theme, 12 episodes	
