= Lucas (rapper) =

Hong Kong rapper (born 1999)

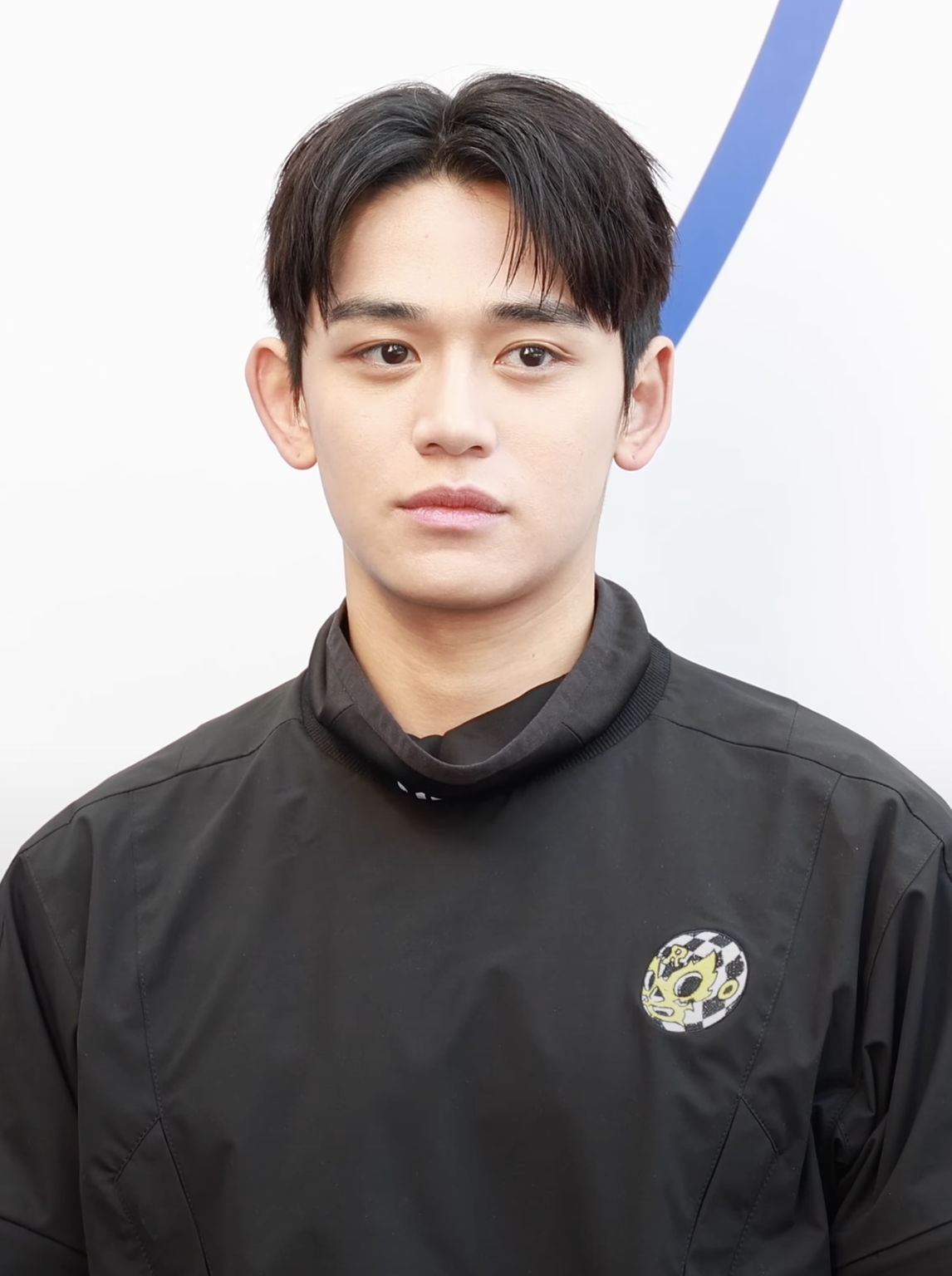
- Lucas in February 2025
- Born: Wong Yuk-hei; 25 January 1999 (age 27); Sha Tin, Hong Kong
- Occupations: Rapper; singer
- Years active: 2018–present
- Musical career
- Origin: South Korea
- Genres: Hip-hop; K-pop; C-pop
- Labels: SM; Label V
- Formerly of: SM Rookies; NCT; WayV; SuperM; SM Town

Chinese name
- Traditional Chinese: 黃旭熙
- Simplified Chinese: 黄旭熙
Transcriptions
Standard Mandarin
- Hanyu Pinyin: Huáng Xùxī
- Wade–Giles: Huang Hsu-hsi
Yue: Cantonese
- Jyutping: Wong^{4} Juk^{1}-hei^{1}

Signature
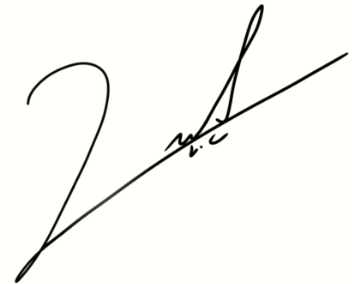

Wong Yuk-hei (Chinese: 黃旭熙; born 25 January 1999), known professionally as Lucas (Korean: 루카스), is a Hong Kong rapper formerly signed under SM Entertainment. He is a former member of South Korean boy group NCT and its Chinese sub-unit WayV, and he was chosen by SM to be a member of the supergroup SuperM. He made his solo debut on 1 April 2024, with the single album Renegade.

== Early life ==
Lucas was born on 25 January 1999 in Sha Tin, Hong Kong, to a Hongkonger father and a Thai mother. He has one younger brother and attended Tung Wah Group of Hospitals' Yow Kam Yuen College.

Lucas helped run a Thai restaurant in Hong Kong owned by his parents. He visited Thailand often, at least once a year, to rest and visit his mother's family.

== Career ==
=== 2015–2017: Pre-debut activities ===
In late 2015, Lucas was scouted by SM Entertainment after passing a Global Audition in Hong Kong. As an SM trainee, Lucas received training in modelling before switching to idol preparations and learning singing, rapping, and dancing. On 5 April 2017, he was introduced as a member of SM Rookies, a pre-debut training team of young trainees. On 7 April 2017, Lucas made an appearance in NCT member Ten's "Dream In A Dream" music video. Lucas, whose mother tongue is Cantonese, studied Korean and Mandarin in preparation for his debut.

=== 2018–2019: Debut with NCT, WayV, SuperM, and solo activities ===
In January 2018, SM Entertainment unveiled NCT 2018, a project group for the expansive boy group NCT. Lucas, together with Kun and Jungwoo, were the group's newest members. The trio were introduced in SM's NCT 2018 Yearbook #1 on 30 January 2018. Lucas officially made his debut with NCT on 14 March with their debut studio album NCT 2018 Empathy. Lucas recorded three songs for the album as part of the sub-unit NCT U, including title tracks "Boss," "Yestoday" (both as NCT U), and "Black on Black" (as NCT 2018). To promote the album, Lucas appeared on Korean variety shows Real Man 300 and Law of the Jungle in Last Indian Ocean as a regular cast member.

Lucas was featured on Taeyeon's "All Night Long," a track recorded for her EP Something New, released in June 2018. The song peaked at number 72 on the Gaon Digital Chart.

Lucas made his runway debut at Seoul Fashion Week in 2018, walking for fashion streetwear brand KYE, Charm's, and Kappa.

In November 2018, SM Entertainment released the digital single "Coffee Break" by Jonah Nilsson and Lucas featuring Richard Bona for its SM Station 3 project. In December 2018, Lucas was announced as part of NCT's China-based unit WayV, managed by SM Entertainment subsidiary Label V. The seven-member unit officially debuted on 17 January 2019 with their debut single album The Vision. Its lead single "Regular" was the Mandarin version of "Regular" by NCT 127. The following month, Lucas joined the cast of Chinese variety show Keep Running as a fixed cast member for its seventh season.

On 7 August 2019, Lucas was announced as a member of SuperM, a K-pop supergroup created by SM Entertainment in collaboration with Capitol Records. The group's promotions began in October, aimed at the American market. SuperM's self-titled debut EP was released on 4 October 2019 with lead single "Jopping". On 5 October, Lucas held his first concert with SuperM at the Capitol Records Building in Los Angeles, preceding a world tour with stops in North America and planned stops in Europe and Asia.

=== 2020–2023: NCT 2020, Kick Back, hiatus, and departure from NCT and WayV ===
In October 2020, Lucas returned to perform with NCT for the first time since "Black on Black" in 2018 for the second group-wide project, NCT 2020, featuring all 23 members. He participated in the album Resonance Pt. 1 on the songs "Make A Wish (Birthday Song)" and its English version, "Faded In My Last Song", and "Volcano" by NCT U, as well as "Nectar" by WayV. He also participated in the all-members single "Resonance".

On 10 March 2021, WayV released their third EP, Kick Back, with the lead single of the same name. The album became the group's first number one album on Gaon Album Chart.

Lucas rejoined Keep Running as a regular cast member for its ninth season.

On 25 August 2021, Lucas was scheduled to release the single "Jalapeño" alongside fellow WayV member Hendery. However, following controversy arising from his alleged past relationships, SM Entertainment and Label V announced that the release, as well as its promotions, had been postponed. Lucas also announced that he would temporarily halt his activities with WayV.

On 10 May 2023, SM Entertainment announced that Lucas would be departing from NCT and WayV to pursue his individual endeavours.

=== 2024–present: Solo debut with Renegade ===
In February 2024, Lucas released a two part documentary series entitled Freeze on his official YouTube channel. The documentary followed Lucas through his daily life during his hiatus, and reflected on the events of the previous two years, stating: "I had terrible thoughts; I was so sorry I wanted to die, because honestly it was all my fault.

On 8 March 2024, it was reported that Lucas would be making his solo debut in April, with SM Entertainment confirming as such later that day. Renegade, Lucas's debut single album, was released on 1 April 2024, along with the lead single of the same name. The album debuted at number 13 on South Korea's Circle Album Chart with first week sales of 25,897 copies. After Renegade's release, Lucas embarked on his first solo tour, a fan-con tour of Asia entitled Fiat Lux. The tour began in Hong Kong on 13 April, and continued to Jakarta, Taipei and Manila over the following weeks.

On 24 April 2026, SM Entertainment announced on Weverse the conclusion of Lucas' contract with the agency.

== Discography ==
=== Single albums ===
Title	Details	Peak chart positions	Sales
Title	Details	KOR	Sales
Renegade	Released: 1 April 2024; Label: SM Entertainment; Formats: CD, digital download, streaming	13	KOR: 31,961

=== Singles ===
Title	Year	Album
"Renegade"	2024	Renegade

=== Collaborations ===
Title	Year	Album
"Coffee Break" (with Jonah Nilsson featuring Richard Bona)	2018	Non-album single

=== Soundtrack appearances ===
Title	Year	Album
"造亿万吨光芒" (with Angelababy, Li Chen, Zheng Kai, Zhu Yawen, Wang Yanlin, Song Yuqi)	2019	Keep Running OST

=== As a featured artist ===
Title	Year	Peak chart positions	Album
Title	Year	KOR	Album
"All Night Long" (저녁의 이유) (Taeyeon featuring Lucas)	2018	72	Something New

== Filmography ==
=== Television shows ===
Year	English title	Role	Ref.
2018	Real Man 300	Cast member	
2018	Law of the Jungle in Last Indian Ocean	Cast member	
2019	Keep Running	Cast member	
2021	Keep Running	Cast member	
