= Xiaohan (lyricist) =

Singaporean female Chinese pop music lyricist

Xiaohan (Chinese: 小寒; pinyin: Xiǎo Hán) is a Singaporean female Chinese pop music lyricist.

== Biography ==
She published her first lyrical work ('義無反顧' performed by 阮丹青) in 1998. Ever since 2000, where she earned a nomination spot in the Singapore Hit Awards with '你抽的煙', Xiaohan has been a consistent nominee in the annual event. She became the first female to be crowned Best Local Lyricist at the Singapore Hit Awards 2002 with '紙飛機'. Xiaohan reclaimed the title again in 2004, with '無底洞'. She held on to the title in 2007, 2008 and 2010 with '雨天' (Performed by Stefanie Sun), '達爾文' and '抛物綫' (Both performed by Tanya Chua) respectively. In addition to the Singapore Hit Awards, Xiaohan's lyrical works were also recognised in Singapore Compass Awards as well as Singapore eAwards. '達爾文' garnered Xiaohan her first regional Best Lyricist nomination in Taiwan's Golden Melody Awards in 2008.

From the Chinese pop music scene, Xiaohan expanded her scope to penning lyrics for musicals. She was also involved in the Speak Mandarin Campaign 2006, a fund-raising album "Hands United" for the 2004 tsunami victims and being a judge in various competitions.

She is currently the co-director of Funkie Monkies Productions with Eric Ng. With the collaboration of Funkie Monkies Productions with Royston Tan, Xiaohan participated in the making of the soundtracks for Royston Tan's blockbusters, "881" and "12蓮花". In 2008 and 2009, Xiaohan had the honour of penning the mandarin version of the Singapore National Day theme song, titled '晴空萬里' (performed by Joi Chua) and '就在這裡' (performed by Kelvin Tan) respectively.

== Awards and nominations ==
Years	Awards & Nominations
2000	7th Singapore Hit Awards, Best Local Lyricist Nomination (你抽的煙)
2002	9th Singapore Hit Awards, Best Local Lyricist Winner (紙飛機)
2004	11th Singapore Hit Awards, Best Local Lyricist Nomination (归属感, 夜盲症); 11th Singapore Hit Awards, Best Local Lyricist Winner (無底洞)
2005	12th Singapore Hit Awards, Best Local Lyricist Nomination (保管, 我的爱, 双栖动物)
2006	Singapore Compass Awards 2006, Best Local Chinese Pop Song (我的爱)
2007	Singapore Compass Awards 2007, Best Local Chinese Pop Song (双栖动物); 13th Singapore Hit Awards, Best Local Lyricist Winner (雨天) Best Local Lyricist Nomination (障眼法, 一下下)
2008	19th Golden Melody Award, Best Lyricist Nomination (達爾文I); 14th Singapore Hit Awards, Best Local Lyricist Winner (達爾文) Best Local Lyricist Nomination (一人一半); 8th Global Chinese Music Awards, Best Lyrics (達爾文)
2009	Singapore Compass Awards 2009, Young Songwriter of the Year; Singapore e-Awards 2009, Best Local Lyricist Award (同花順); 15th Singapore Hit Awards, Best Local Lyricist Nomination (同花順，疼憨人)
2010	TVB8, Best Lyrics Award (寂寞先生); Singapore e-Awards 2010, Best Local Lyricist Award (拋物線); 16th Singapore Hit Awards, Best Local Lyricist Winner (拋物線) Best Local Lyricist Nomination (假動作，手中線)
2011	Singapore Compass Awards 2011, Best Chinese Pop Song (寂寞先生)
2012	The Association of Music Workers in Taiwan, Top 10 Quality Single (孤獨患者); Singapore e-Awards 2012, Best Local Lyricist Award (孤獨患者); 17th Singapore Hit Awards, Best Local Lyricist Nomination (複製人，眼淚是膠囊，逞強)
2013	Life Theatre Award Special Mention for SongWriting（老九）; 18th Singapore Hit Awards, Best Local Lyricist Winner (十萬毫升淚水) Best Local Lyricist Nomination (淚若雨下、十萬毫升淚水); The Association of Music Workers in Taiwan, Top 10 Quality Single (十萬毫升淚水、邊愛邊學)
2014	18th Singapore Hit Awards, Best Local Lyricist Winner (對的人錯的時候) Best Local Lyricist Nomination (對的人錯的時候、楓葉做的風鈴、傷者)
2015	Singapore Compass Awards 2015, Best Soundtrack (十萬毫升淚水)

== Representative lyrical works ==
- 纖維 (林憶蓮)
- 偉大的渺小 (林俊傑)
- 紙飛機 (林憶蓮)
- 詞不達意 (林憶蓮)
- 為我好 (梁靜茹)
- 無底洞 (蔡健雅)
- 達爾文(蔡健雅)
- 踮起腳尖愛 (洪佩瑜)
- 平衡感 (Alin)
- 我的愛(孫燕姿)
- 雨天 (孫燕姿)
- 平常心 (張惠妹)
- 壞的好人 (張惠妹)
- We are One (蔡健雅、那英、林憶蓮、張惠妹、楊丞琳、蕭亞軒、Alin、小S)
- 單 (楊丞琳)
- 摩天輪 (田馥甄)
- 一人一半 (伍家輝)
- 敢傷 (蕭亞軒)
- 寂寞先生 (曹格)
- 孤獨患者 (陳奕迅)
- 淚若雨下 (喬毓明)
- 一生一事 (EXO)
- 为心導航 (EXO)
- 梦想发射计划 (威神V)
- 天空海 （威神V）

== Representative literary works ==
- 眼淚是膠囊 (2011)
- 無指幸福 (2013)
- 回不去的候車站 (2015)
- 幸好我不是滿分女生 (2017)

== Musicals involved ==
- 老九 (2005, 2012 & 2017)
- 快樂 (2005)
- 聊斋 (2010)

== Movie soundtracks ==
- 881 OST 1 & 2
- 12蓮花 OST
- 小字條
