= Connection (Up10tion album) =

- Digital and streaming cover

Studio album by Up10tion
- Released: June 14, 2021
- Recorded: 2020–2021
- Venues: Seoul, South Korea
- Studio: TOP Studio
- Genre: K-pop
- Length: 33:17
- Language: Korean
- Labels: TOP Media; Kakao Entertainment

Up10tion chronology
Light Up (2020)	Connection (2021)	Novella (2022)

Singles from Connection
- 1. "Spin Off" Released: June 14, 2021

Connection is the second studio album from South Korean boy band Up10tion. The album was released on June 14, 2021. The album consists of ten songs, with "Spin Off" serving as the lead single.

== Background ==
Connection is Up10tion's first album in over three years following the release of Invitation on March 15, 2018.

Members Sunyoul and Hwanhee have previously participated in episode 7 of MBC's Voice King.

== Release and commercial performance ==
On May 20, 2021, a comeback spoiler image was released by TOP Media through the group's official social accounts.

The group held their showcase in the afternoon on the same day as their comeback. The album was released on June 14 at 6:00 KST. The music video for the single "Spin Off" was also released.

The album debuted in number 3 on South Korean Gaon Charts which was followed by 12 in Japan Digital Charts respectively.

== Songs ==
Kuhn and Bitto co-wrote eight of out of the ten tracks. Kogyeol wrote and composed for the song, "Sky Line". Xiao also wrote and composed the songs, "Destroyed" and "Honey Cake".

== Track listing ==
Connection track listing
No.	Title	Lyrics	Music	Arrangements	Length
1.	"Spin Off"	최현준, Kuhn, Bit-to	최현준, 이민영 (EastWest), coldcow (1by1)	이민영 (EastWest), coldcow (1by1)	3:25
2.	"Liar"	Real-Fantasy, Kinda, siyun, Kuhn, Bit-to	Real-Fantasy, Kinda	Real-Fantasy, Kinda	3:38
3.	"Summer Drive"	Kuhn, Bit-to, Danke, 서혜리 (Jam Factory), 김지나 (Jam Factory), 허지은 (Jam Factory), 최진하 (Jam Factory)	Stereo14, Josef Melin, 장준신	Stereo14, 장준신	3:06
4.	"Parade"	OF'F, th!nk, Kuhn, Bit-to	Sean Oh, Long Drive, OF'F, th!nk	Sean Oh, Long Drive	3:36
5.	"Destroyed"	Junsoo (A-Tunes), Donghwan (A-Tunes), Xiao, Dez (A-Tunes), Kuhn, Bit-to	Junsoo (A-Tunes), LoveTom, Donghwan (A-Tunes), Xiao, Dez (A-Tunes)	Junsoo (A-Tunes), Donghwan (A-Tunes), Showwer (A-Tunes)	3:29
6.	"If" (만약) (Kogyeol and Hwanhee duet)	김원	김원	김원, 배형호	3:42
7.	"Forever" (혹시라도) (Unit Kuhn, Sunyoul, Gyujin, Xiao)	Kyum Lyk (513/Joombas), Ryan, Kuhn	Kyum Lyk (513/Joombas), Ryan	Kyum Lyk (513/Joombas), Ryan	2:55
8.	"Believe in You"	정윤, Kuhn, Bit-to	MoonKim, 정윤	정윤	3:03
9.	"Sky Line" (Kogyeol and Bit-to duet)	Bit-to, Kogyeol, 1Hz, 우성준	1Hz, Bit-to, Kogyeol, 우성준	1Hz, Bit-to	3:14
10.	"Honey Cake"	Junsoo (A-Tunes), Dez (A-Tunes), Oak (A-Tunes), Dongwhan (A-Tunes), Showwer (A-Tunes), Xiao, Kuhn, Bit-to	LoveTom, Junsoo (A-Tunes), Dez (A-Tunes), Donghwan (A-Tunes), Xiao	Junsoo (A-Tunes), Donghwan (A-Tunes)	3:03
Total length:					33:17

== Charts ==
Chart performance for Connection
Chart (2021)	Peak position
South Korean Albums (Gaon)	3
