= Summer Go! =

2016 Extended play by UP10TION

EP by UP10TION
- Released: August 5, 2016
- Genre: K-pop
- Language: Korean
- Label: TOP Media; LOEN Entertainment

UP10TION chronology
Spotlight (2016)	Summer Go! (2016)	Burst (2016)

Singles from Summer Go!
- 1. "Tonight" Released: August 5, 2016

Summer Go! is the fourth extended play from South Korean boy band UP10TION. It was released on August 5, 2016, by TOP Media. The album consists of six tracks, including the title track, "Tonight".

== Commercial performance ==
The EP sold 73,561+ copies in South Korea. It peaked at number 1 on the Korean Gaon Chart.

== Track listing ==
Official track list
No.	Title	Lyrics	Music	Arrangements	Length
1.	"Tonight" (오늘이 딱이야 (夜半逃走))	Oreo; Sweetch	Oreo; Sweetch	Oreo; Sweetch	3:24
2.	"Beautiful" (예뻐)	Kim Won	Kim Won; 청담동박건우	Kim Won; 청담동박건우	3:33
3.	"Oasis" (오아시스)	Marco	Marco	Marco	3:34
4.	"Magic"	Mafly; Keyfly	Hyuk Shin; Reone; Davey Nate; MRey	Hyuk Shin; MRey; Reone	3:04
5.	"Be My Luck" (행운이 되어줘)	Esbee; Yama Art; Dong Ne-hyung; Won Young-heon	Esbee; Yama Art; Dong Ne-hyung; Won Young-heon	Esbee; Yama Art; Dong Ne-hyung; Won Young-heon	3:03
6.	"Tonight inst." (오늘이 딱이야 (夜半逃走))		Oreo; Sweetch	Oreo; Sweetch	3:24
Total length:					21:00
