= Stardom (EP) =

2017 extended play by Up10tion

- Standard cover

EP by Up10tion
- Released: June 29, 2017
- Recorded: 2017
- Genre: K-pop
- Length: 22:00
- Language: Korean
- Label: TOP Media; LOEN Entertainment

Up10tion chronology
Burst (2016)	Stardom (2017)	Special Photo Edition (2017)

Singles from Stardom
- 1. "Runner" Released: June 29, 2017

Stardom (stylized as Star;dom) is the sixth extended play from South Korean boy band Up10tion. It was released on June 29, 2017, by TOP Media. The album consists of six tracks, including the lead single "Runner" for which a teaser video was released June 27. A preview video for the songs was released the day before the EP. It marked their first release as nine members with Wooseok on hiatus. At the 32nd Golden Disc Awards the album was nominated in Album Bonsang, and shortlisted the Asia Association Music Prize.

== Music video and commercial performance ==
The music video teasers were released on June 27 and 28, 2017, and it was released alongside the album, as of 2022 the video received 3 million views.

The EP sold 95,963+ copies in South Korea. It peaked at number 1 on the Korean Gaon Chart.

== Track listing ==
Stardom
No.	Title	Lyrics	Music	Arrangements	Length
1.	"Runner" (시작해)	Sun; Maker; Ssengirl	Sun; Yoon Young-min	Yoon Young-min	3:19
2.	"Everything"	Ponde	Hyuk Shin; Reone; Davey Nate	Reone	3:55
3.	"True Love" (너다운)	Park Sang-joon; Lee Jin-sil; Kuhn; Wei; Bitto	Park Sang-joon; Lee Jin-sil	Park Sang-joon; Lee Jin-sil	3:31
4.	"Hot Blood"	Park Sang-joon; Kuhn; Wei; Bitto	Park Sang-joon; Yoon Jong-woon; Im So-hyeok	Park Sang-joon; Yoon Jong-woon; Im So-hyeok	3:25
5.	"Everyday" (매일)	Chloe; Noday; Kuhn; Bitto	Noday; Chloe	Noday; Chloe	3:42
6.	"Dream You"	어벤전승; Bitto	어벤전승	어벤전승	3:41
Total length:					22:00
