= Laberinto (EP) =

2018 Extended play by UP10TION

EP by UP10TION
- Released: December 6, 2018
- Recorded: 2018
- Venue: Seoul, South Korea
- Studio: TOP Studios
- Genre: K-pop
- Language: Korean
- Label: TOP Media; Kakao M

UP10TION chronology
2018 Special Photo Edition (2018)	Laberinto (2018)	The Moment of Illusion (2019)

Singles from Laberinto
- 1. "Blue Rose" Released: December 6, 2018

Laberinto is the seventh extended play from South Korean boy band UP10TION. It was released on December 6, 2018, by TOP Media. The album consists of seven tracks, including the title track, "Blue Rose". This album is also the last time members Lee Jin-hyuk and Kim Woo-seok have promoted with the group, which has been on hiatus since then.

== Background ==
UP10TION released their first studio album "Invitation" back in March 2018. After that, the group had 3 tours in Japan, North America and Europe in May, June and September separately with a total of 15 shows. They also released their Japan 3rd album "Chaser" on August 8 and their 2018 Special Photo Edition on August 20.

== Release and promotion ==
On November 22, 2018, TOP Media release the schedule for UP10TION's seventh mini-album "Laberinto". On December 6, UP10TION released the music video for the eponymous single "Blue Rose". The group held their showcase at Ilji Art Hall. The group started promoting on music shows starting on December 7 on Music Bank then on Show! Music Core, Inkigayo and M Countdown. They also promoted the side track "With You" once on Music Bank.

On January 11, 2019, UP10TION ended the promotions for the album after 6 weeks.

On January 19, The group proceeded to promoted Laberinto in Japan with 2 showcases on January 19 and 27. They also held performance events between January 20 through February 3 for their promotion activities.

== Concept and album ==
The album name "Laberinto" means maze and labyrinth in Spanish. The album had two versions, "Clue" and "Crime" version. Each version had a 84-page booklet, 1 tarot card and 1 agent card.

== Songs ==
Wei and Bitto were co-credited for six out of the seven songs while Kuhn was co-credited for five out of the seven songs on the album.

The first track, "Laberinto" is an intro song for their album. The next song is "Blue Rose" which is the title track. Wei described the song as "dramatic" and "magnificent feeling". The lyrics are talking about how "the more you are hurt by a woman, the deeper you fall into her".

== Commercial performance ==
The EP sold 40,428+ copies in South Korea. It peaked at number 4 on the Korean Gaon Chart.

== Track listing ==
Official track list
No.	Title	Lyrics	Music	Arrangements	Length
1.	"Laberinto"		Daniel Kim; Jeremy G	Daniel Kim; Jeremy G	0:54
2.	"Blue Rose"	Lee Miso; Kim Chulin; Daniel Kim; Kuhn; Wei; Bitto	Daniel Kim; Jeremy G; Erik Wigelius	Erik Wigelius	3:16
3.	"Burning"	Jarry Potter; Kuhn; Wei; Bitto	Park Haeil; Pillib Gwon; Jarry Potter	Park Haeil; Pillib Gwon	3:23
4.	"Turn Up The Night"	Ponde; Kuhn; Wei; Bitto	Sven Parys; Gio Mici; Andy Love	Sven Parys; Gio Mici	3:24
5.	"Midnight"	원데이; Kuhn; Wei; Bitto	AYNA; New Chance	New Chance	3:30
6.	"Happy Birthday"	CALII; Wei; Bitto	SUN; CALII	SUN	3:08
7.	"With You"	Bitto; 1hz; Kuhn; Wei	Bitto; 1hz	Bitto; 1hz	3:29
Total length:					21:06

== Credits and personnel ==
- Jinhoo - vocals, background vocals
- Kuhn - rap
- Kogyeol - vocals, background vocals
- Wei - rap
- Bitto - rap
- Wooshin - vocals
- Sunyoul - vocals, background vocals
- Gyujin - vocals, background vocals
- Hwanhee - vocals, background vocals
- Xiao - vocals, background vocals

== Released history ==
Country	Date	Format	Label
South Korea	December 6, 2018	digital download; CD; streaming	TOP Media, Kakao M
Worldwide	December 6, 2018	digital download; CD; streaming	TOP Media, Kakao M
