= Take Off (WayV EP) =

2019 EP by WayV

EP by WayV
- Released: May 9, 2019
- Recorded: 2019
- Studios: Doobdoob (Seoul); MonoTree (Seoul); SM Big Shot (Seoul); SM Blue Cup (Seoul); SM Blue Ocean (Seoul); SM LVYIN (Seoul); SM SSAM (Seoul); The Vibe (Seoul)
- Genre: Mandopop
- Length: 20:22
- Languages: Mandarin; English
- Labels: Label V; SM
- Producers: The Stereotypes; Yoo Young-jin

WayV chronology
The Vision (2019)	Take Off (2019)	Take Over the Moon (2019)

NCT chronology
Awaken (2019)	Take Off (2019)	We Are Superhuman (2019)

Singles from Take Off
- 1. "Take Off" Released: May 9, 2019

Take Off is the first extended play (EP) by the Chinese boy band WayV. It was released on May 9, 2019, by Label V and SM Entertainment with a lead single of the same name. Consisting of three previously released songs and three new songs, it features participation from songwriters and production teams, such as The Stereotypes, LDN Noise, Yoo Young-jin, and others. Upon its release, the EP debuted at seventh on the Billboard World Albums Chart and claimed number one on the iTunes Top Album Chart in 30 regions. Meanwhile, "Take Off" peaked at number one on the QQ Music Popularity Real-time Chart.

== Background and release ==
Following their debut digital EP The Vision in January, WayV started to release teaser images, promotional video teasers, and a music video teaser daily for their upcoming first EP Take Off. The album consists of three previously released songs and three new songs, including the title track "Take Off". It was released digitally on May 9, 2019, by Label V and SM Entertainment while the physical album was released through Chinese retail company Dangdang on May 15.

The group also released a self-filmed music video for the track "Let Me Love U" on June 13.

== Composition ==
Take Off is a six-track extended play consisting of three new songs and three previously released tracks - Chinese versions of "Regular" and "Come Back", as well as "Dream Launch". The album is opened by the title track "Take Off", described as an "urban dance genre track with powerful trap drum sounds and a catchy club bass line" that breaks into a hard-rock section towards the end. The following new track "Say It" is a future bass style song with a sneering classical violin motif that is full of contradictions and chaotic emotions. Meanwhile, "Let Me Love U" is a mid-tempo song with an acoustic R&B-pop vibe composed by The Stereotypes.

== Single and promotion ==
=== Single ===
The title track "Take Off" was released through a music video that comes across as a celebration of adrenaline rush. The members of WayV pose with various modes of fast transportation, including airplanes, bikes and race cars. Filmed in Kyiv, Ukraine, the unfinished Podilsko-Vyhurivska Bridge and the Sahaidachny Street can be seen in the video. Also, several shots were filmed in the hangar, against the background of the Ukrainian plane of Antonov State Enterprise. Upon its release, the song peaked at number one on the QQ Music Popularity Chart and debuted at number two on the weekly chart. It also debuted at number twenty-five on the Billboard World Digital Song Sales.

=== Live performances ===
To kick off the promotion of the album, WayV held a global press conference on May 9 and performed "Regular" and "Take Off". On June 18, the group then performed "Take Off" in a gala dinner of the AACTA Awards in Shanghai as its ambassador. They also guested and performed the song in the Chinese variety show Day Day Up on June 23.

== Commercial performance ==
Upon its release, the album claimed number one on iTunes top album chart in 30 regions and debuted at seventh on the Billboard World Albums Chart.

== Track listing ==
Take Off track listing
No.	Title	Lyrics	Music	Arrangement	Length
1.	"Take Off" (Chinese: 无翼而飞; pinyin: Wúyìérfēi; lit. 'Flying without Wings')	Matthew Yen	Mike Daley; Mitchell Owens; Wilbart "Vedo" McCoy III; Jeff Lewis	Daley; Owens; Yoo Young-jin; Hitchhiker	3:53
2.	"Regular" (Chinese: 理所当然; pinyin: Lǐsuǒdāngrán; lit. 'Goes without Saying')	Yen	Daley; Owens; Wilbart 'Vedo' McCoy III; George Kranz; Yoo	Daley; Owens	3:37
3.	"Say It" (Chinese: 真实谎言; pinyin: Zhēnshí Huǎngyán; lit. 'True Lies')	Pan Yanting	LDN Noise; Andrew Choi; Lauren Dyson	LDN Noise; Choi; Dyson	3:15
4.	"Come Back" (Chinese: 噩梦; pinyin: Èmèng; lit. 'Nightmare')	Yen	Saley; Owens; Michael Jiminez; Deez; MZMC; Jeremy "Tay" Jasper	Daley; Owens	3:25
5.	"Let Me Love U" (Chinese: 爱不释手; pinyin: Àibùshìshǒu; lit. 'Love You Too Much to Let Go')	Wu I-Wei	The Stereotypes; Kameron "Kam Parker" Glasper; Joseph "220" Park (Iconic Sounds)	The Stereotypes	3:46
6.	"Dream Launch" (Chinese: 梦想发射计划; pinyin: Mèngxiǎng Fāshè Jìhuà; lit. 'Dream Launch Plan')	Xiaohan	Hyuk Shin (Joombas); Sun (Joombas); Bae Min-soo (Joombas); Jeff Lewis	Joombas	3:46
Total length:					20:22

== Charts ==
Chart performance for Take Off
Chart (2018)	Peak position
French Digital Albums (SNEP)	76
US World Albums (Billboard)	7

== Release history ==
Release history for Take Off
Region	Date	Format	Label
China	May 9, 2019	Download; streaming	Label V
Various	May 9, 2019	Download; streaming	Label V; SM Entertainment
China	May 16, 2019	CD	Label V
