= Burst (Up10tion EP) =

2016 Extended play by UP10TION

- Digital cover

EP by UP10TION
- Released: November 21, 2016
- Recorded: 2016
- Venue: Seoul, South Korea
- Genre: K-pop
- Language: Korean
- Label: TOP Media; LOEN Entertainment

UP10TION chronology
Summer Go! (2016)	Burst (2016)	Stardom (2017)

Singles from Burst
- 1. "White Night" Released: November 21, 2016

Burst is the fifth extended play from South Korean boy band Up10tion. It was released on November 21, 2016, by TOP Media. The album consists of six tracks, including the title track, "White Night".

== Music video ==
It depicts those members we’re in the hockey tournament, a member Wooseok was fighting with Kogyeol when they lost their game later then after the game, Wooseok with their girlfriend Jeon So-mi when they hung out together next thing the members Jinhoo, Lee Jin-hyuk and Gyujin we’re in the bridge together, at the night Wooseok went to attempt to win the girlfriend but he was caught cheating against the member Kogyeol, The video ends seeing winning the battle.

== Commercial performance ==
The EP sold 83,737+ copies in South Korea. It peaked at number 1 on the Korean Gaon Chart.

== Track listing ==
Official track list
No.	Title	Lyrics	Music	Arrangements	Length
1.	"Ignition"		Oreo	C-no; Oreo; Yi Gi	1:14
2.	"White Night" (하얗게 불태웠어)	Oreo	Oreo	Oreo	3:28
3.	"Go!" (전력질주)	Yi Gi; Yong Bae; Bluesun	Yi Gi; Yong Bae	Yi Gi; Yong Bae	3:16
4.	"Because" (왜냐하면)	Oreo	Oreo	Oreo	3:46
5.	"Stuck On You" (빠져가지고)	Wonpil, Young K, Sungjin (Day6); Daniel Kim	Wonpil, Young K, Sungjin (Day6); Daniel Kim	Daniel Kim; Wonpil	3:39
6.	"Just Like That"	Noday; Chloe	Noday; Chloe	Noday; Chloe	3:52
Total length:					20:00
