= Top Secret (Up10tion EP) =

2015 Extended play by UP10TION

EP by UP10TION
- Released: September 11, 2015
- Recorded: 2015
- Venue: Seoul, South Korea
- Studio: Top Media
- Genre: K-pop, Dance
- Language: Korean
- Label: TOP Media; LOEN Entertainment

UP10TION chronology
Top Secret (2015)	Bravo! (2015)

Singles from Top Secret
- 1. "So, Dangerous" Released: September 11, 2015

Top Secret (一級秘密 (일급비밀)) is the first extended play from South Korean boy band UP10TION. It was released on September 11, 2015, by TOP Media. The album consists of six tracks, including the title track, "So, Dangerous".

== Commercial performance ==
The EP sold 17,536+ copies in South Korea. It peaked at number 7 on the Korean Gaon Chart.

== Track listing ==
Official track list
No.	Title	Lyrics	Music	Arrangements	Length
1.	"Tension Up!"		Hyuk Shin; MRey	Hyuk Shin; MRey	0:48
2.	"So, Dangerous" (위험해)	Hwang Seong-jin; Seo Yi-rae(RBW)	Hyuk Shin; MRey; Jarah Gibson; DK	Hyuk Shin; MRey	3:30
3.	"Come As You Are" (그대로)	Kim Won	Kim Won	Kim Won	3:35
4.	"Neverending"	Changjo; Heo Seong-jin	Heo Seong-jin; Changjo	Heo Seong-jin	3:08
5.	"Phoenix"	MGMZ	MGMZ	MGMZ	3:01
6.	"Come With Me"	Kim Dong-yeol; Song Yang-ha; Brand Newjiq	Kim Dong-yeol; Song Yang-ha; Brand Newjiq	Kim Dong-yeol; Song Yang-ha; Brand Newjiq)	3:08
Total length:					17:10
