= Hyuk Shin =

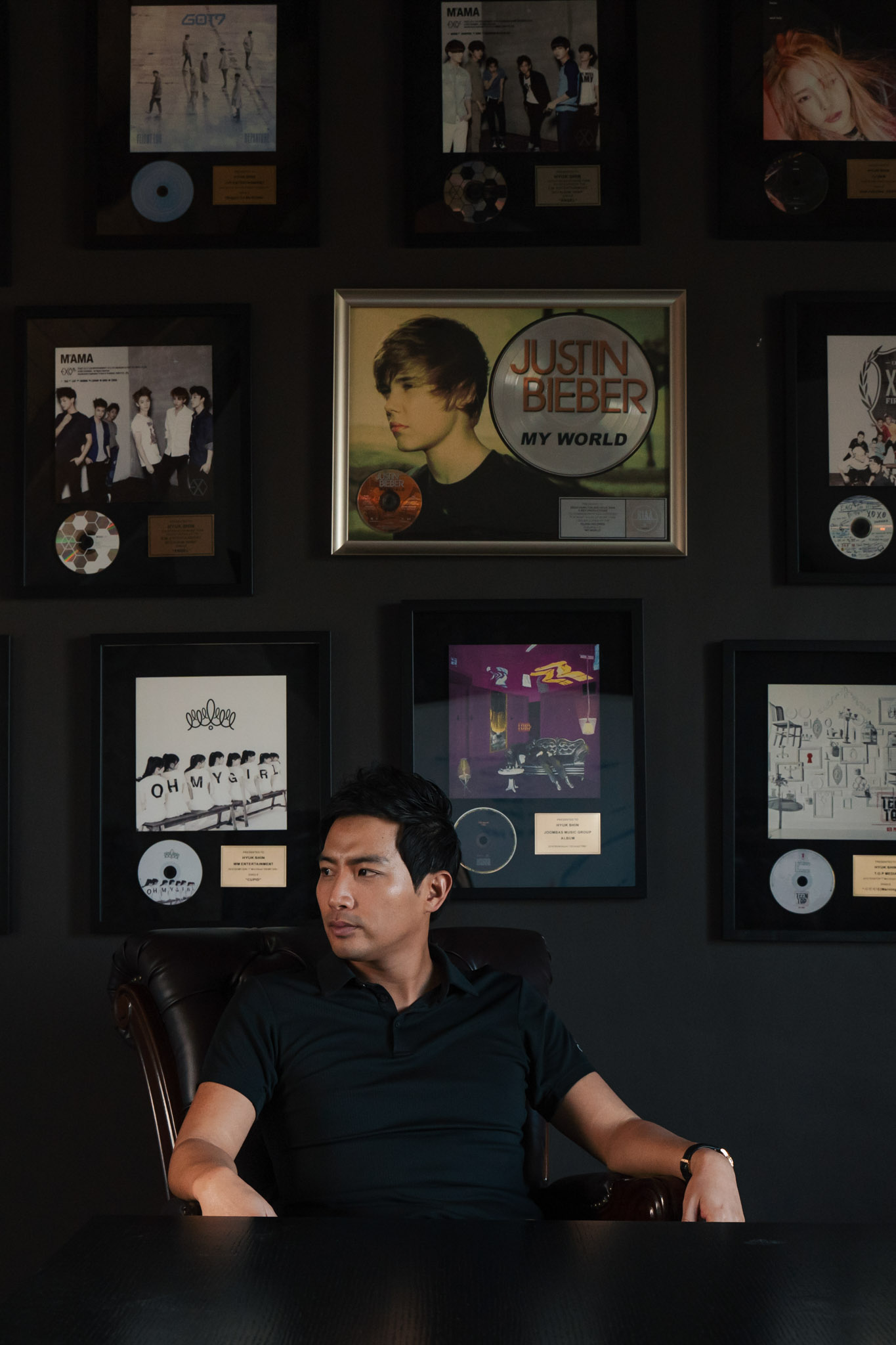

Background information
- Born: Seoul, South Korea
- Genres: Pop, K-pop
- Occupations: CEO; record producer; entrepreneur
- Years active: 2004–present
- Label: 153/Joombas Music Group
- Website: https://153joombas.com/

Hyuk Shin (Korean: 신혁; born June 5, 1985) is a South Korean record producer, music executive, and entrepreneur who has worked with artists including as Justin Bieber, Anderson .Paak, Blackbear, Dean, NCT, Super Junior, TXT, EXO, Monsta X, Shinee, and Girls' Generation.

Shin was the first South Korean-born record producer to have entered the US Billboard Hot 100 in 2009 with Justin Bieber's hit single "One Less Lonely Girl". He established 153/Joombas Music Group in 2011, an independent music production and music publishing company.

Shin produced "Growl" by EXO in 2013, which led to the first million-seller album in the digital streaming era. "Growl" was also selected as the representative K-Pop song at the 2018 PyeongChang Winter Olympics and ranked No. 2 on Melon's Top 100 Best K-Pop Songs of All Time.

As an entrepreneur, Shin has partnered with global music companies such as Warner Music Group, Warner Chappell Music, Universal Music Group, and SM Entertainment for various projects and ventures.

== Career ==
=== Early career ===
Shin began his career as a singer-songwriter in 2004, with the release of his first album "Soar". The title song "Robot" was composed by K-pop ballad composer "Hyung-seok Kim" and the lyrics were written by Korean poet Tae-yeon Won. At age 20, he moved to Boston, Massachusetts to attend Berklee College of Music to achieve his goal that he had since 5th grade; charting his song on the Billboard. In his interview with Melon in 2012, he mentioned that moving to the United States to develop his musical ability was the best decision he has ever made.

=== A-Rex Production ===
Teaming up with songwriter Sean Hamilton, Shin started the music production duo "A-Rex". They worked together for 4 years until they made Justin Bieber's "One Less Lonely Girl," which debuted at No. 16 on the Billboard Hot 100, on the issue dated October 24, 2009. The song had 113,000 downloads in its first week and later scored the second-highest debut of the week, only being surpassed by "3" by Britney Spears. As of February 2011, the single has sold over 1,025,000 digital copies in the United States. In his Melon interview, he said those four years of waiting to achieve the goal, were the hardest time in his life. A-Rex also produced "Right Here Waiting" by Tynisha Keli and "Supa Luv" by Korean male idol group, Teen Top. The song was later remixed and featured on the American movie "Beastly" by the director Daniel Barnz, starring Vanessa Hudgens and Alex Pettyfer.

=== 153 Joombas Music Group ===
In 2011, Shin established Joombas Music Group, an independent music production and music publishing company with offices in Los Angeles, New York, and Seoul. Joombas began producing for major K-pop labels such as SM Entertainment and TOP Media, working to bring fresh, new sounds to the music industry. In 2011, he and Joombas were brought in to contribute to the production and writing of EXO's debut album MAMA in the song "Angel." Exo's debut album MAMA was released in Korea and China in two language editions - Exo-K's Korean version and Exo-M's Mandarin version, and both versions hit No. 1 in Korea (Gaon Chart) and China (SINA Chart).

In 2013, with Shin leading the team, Joombas produced "Romantic St." by "Girls' Generation," "Dream Girl" by "Shinee," "Light Me Up," "G.R.8.U.," and "Voodoo Doll" by VIXX, "Want U Back" by "100%, "Pretty Girl" by F(x), and the mega hit-song "Growl" by EXO. "Growl" peaked at #3 on the Billboard Korea K-Pop Hot 100 chart and number two on South Korea's Gaon Singles chart. The song has also reached #1 one on most of South Korea's major downloadable charts, and stayed in the top five for three consecutive weeks. "Growl" is one of Exo's most successful songs in both chart performance and on South Korean music show awards, winning a total of fourteen number-one trophies throughout its promotional period. Shin and Joombas also produced the songs "Don't Go" and "Black Pearl" for Exo's debut studio album, XOXO.

As of 2018, Joombas Music Group has rebranded to 153/Joombas Music Group.

=== Artist Discovery: Blackbear & DEAN ===
American musician blackbear was discovered by Shin while he was working as a producer in Atlanta, Georgia. Recognizing Musto's potential as a songwriter and artist, Shin helped to craft and develop his sound. Musto would go on to co-write "Boyfriend" for superstar Justin Bieber in 2012.

In 2012, Shin discovered and signed R&B artist Kwon Hyuk (FKA DEAN). Signed to Joombas initially as a songwriter and producer, Shin acknowledged DEAN's potential as an artist and together, began to develop and prepare his project. On July 13, 2015, DEAN released his first single "I'm Not Sorry," featuring Grammy award-winning artist Eric Bellinger. The single gained significant attention as it was rare for a South Korean artist to release an international single in English prior to entering their home market. DEAN would go on to release several more singles featuring popular Korean hip-hop and R&B artists such as Zico, Crush, Dok2, and Gaeko leading up to the release of his debut EP 130 mood: TRBL on March 25, 2016, which was executive produced by Shin. The album received praise from notable music editors such as Billboard's Jeff Benjamin. The EP was selected as one of the 10 Best K-Pop Albums of 2016 by Billboard.

== Partnership ==
=== Warner Music Group ===
In 2018, Shin launched 153 Entertainment Group in a joint-venture partnership with Warner Music Group. 153's first flagship artist in the new partnership is singer-songwriter NIve, who released his first single "Getaway" featuring independent artist JMSN on November 8, 2018.

=== Warner Chappell Music ===
153/Joombas Publishing announces that it has entered a global publishing partnership with Warner Chappell Music in 2021.

== Show It All Vietnam (Tân Binh Toàn Năng) ==
In October 2025, Hyuk Shin entered a partnership with Vietnamese media company YeaH1 to launch the survival idol programme Show It All Vietnam (Tân Binh Toàn Năng). YeaH1 handles media production and broadcast, while Shin provides music direction, training, and artist development. (As of January 2025, YeaH1 formally restructured its slate to focus on Show It All and appointed Shin as a strategic partner.)

The first single from the show, titled "Show Me", was released on 4 October 2025 as the programme's theme song. The music video was shot in Thailand, and the track was produced by Hyuk Shin in collaboration with other songwriters. The single reportedly reaching No. 1 on iTunes Vietnam within 17 hours of its release.

In the show, contestants undergo training in vocals, dance, and performance under a K-pop inspired curriculum. Shin functions as a mentor and music director, shaping the musical identity of the emerging Vietnamese idol group. The programme is broadcast on VTV3.

As of mid-2025, Show It All Vietnam is ongoing.

== Discography ==
Year	Artist	Album	Notes	Charts/Awards
2009	Justin Bieber	My World	Co-producer, co-writer ("One Less Lonely Girl")	RIAA Certified Platinum; No.1 Billboard Album Chart; No. 16 Billboard Hot 100; Canada – Gold; Premio Oye! – Revalacion del Ano
2010	Tynisha Keli	The 5th Element	Co-producer, co-writer ("Right Here Waiting")	No. 36 Oricon Album Chart
2011	Teen Top	Transform	Co-producer, co-writer ("Supa Luv")	No. 6 Gaon Album Chart; No. 40 Gaon Music Chart
2011	Teen Top	A-Rex Remix, "Beastly" OST	Co-producer, co-writer ("Supa Luv")	
2012	Exo	Mama	Co-producer, co-writer ("Angel")	No.1 in Korea (Gaon Chart); No.1 in China (SINA Chart)
2012	Fiestar	We Don't Stop	Co-producer, co-writer	No. 21 Gaon Chart
2013	Girls' Generation	I Got a Boy	Co-producer, co-writer ("Romantic St.")	No. 1 Album in Korea, Taiwan, Hong Kong, Singapore, United States and Philippines; No. 7 Japan Oricon Weekly Albums Chart
2013	Shinee	Dream Girl – The Misconceptions of You	Co-producer ("Dream Girl")	No. 1 Gaon; No. 2 Billboard World Albums; No. 3 Billboard K-Pop Hot 100; No. 5 Billboard Heatseekers; No. 10 Oricon Albums; Bonsang (Album) Golden Disk Awards; Bonsang Seoul Music Award; No. 1 Inkigayo (3/17/13); No. 1 Music Bank (3/8/13, 3/15/13); No. 1 Show Champion (2/27/13, 3/6/13, 3/13/13, 3/20/13); No. 1 M-Countdown (2/28/13, 3/7/13, 3/14/13)
2013	VIXX	Hyde	Co-producer, co-writer ("Light Me Up")	No. 7 World Billboard Chart
2013	100%	Real 100%	Co-producer, co-writer ("Want U Back")	No. 6 Gaon Chart
2013	VIXX	Jekyll	Co-producer, co-writer ("G.R.8.U")	No. 3 Album Gaon Chart; No. 13 Billboard K-Pop Hot 100,
2013	Exo	XOXO	Co-producer, co-writer ("Don't Go")	No. 1 Billboard World Albums Chart; No. 1 South in Korea (Gaon and Hanteo Charts) and Japan (Oricon Chart); No. 2 Vinyuetai V-Chart Album of the Year; No. 23 Billboard US Top Heatseekers Albums; Disk Bonsang – Golden Disk Award; Album of the Year – Mnet Music Awards
2013	f(x)	Pink Tape	Co-producer, Co-writer ("Pretty Girl")	No.1 Gaon Chart Weekly Albums; No.1 Billboard World Album Chart; No. 4 South Korea Gaon Monthly Album Chart
2013	Exo	XOXO Repackage	Co-producer, Co-writer ("Growl")	No. 1 Billboard World Albums No. 1 Gaon No. 1 on Bugs, MelOn, Mnet, Soribada, Daum, Monkey3, Olleh and Naver (Korea) No. 3 Billboard K-Pop Hot 100; Over 1,046,000 albums sold (including XOXO); No.2 Vinyuetai V-Chart Award (Album of the Year); Disk Bonsang – Golden Disk Award (Best Dance & Electronic Music Award); Song of the Year (Melon Music Award); BC – Unionpay Album of the Year (Mnet Music Award); Artist of the Year (Album – 3rd Quarter (Gaon); Record of the Year – Bonsang & Daesang (Seoul Music Award); Song of the Year (KBS Music Festival); World's Best Song (World Music Award); No. 1 Show Champion (8/21/13, 8/28/13, 9/4/13); No. 1 M Countdown (8/22/13, 8/23/13); No. 1 Show! Music Core (8/24/13, 8/31/13, 9/7/13); No. 1 Inkigayo (8/18/13, 8/25/13, 9/1/13)
2013	VIXX	Voodoo	Co-producer, co-writer ("Voodoo Doll")	No.1 Album (Gaon Music Chart); No. 1 Album (Gaon Music Chart); No. 1 Music Bank (12/6/13); No. 3 Gaon Social Chart; No. 7 Single Chart
2013	VIXX	Voodoo	Co-producer, co-writer ("Say You Say Me")	No.1 Album (Gaon Music Chart); No. 1 Album (Gaon Music Chart); No. 1 Music Bank (12/6/13); No. 3 Gaon Social Chart; No. 7 Single Chart
2013	History	Blue Spring	Co-producer, co-writer ("Hello")	
2014	VIXX	Eternity	Co-producer ("Eternity")	No.1 Gaon Chart Weekly Albums; Disk Bonsang Award – Golden Disk Award; No. 1 Inkigayo (6/8/14); No. 1 (6/11/14)
2014	TVXQ	Spell Bound	Co-producer, co-writer ("Heavens Day")	No. 2 Album (Gaon Music Chart)
2014	Uniq	EOEO	Co-producer ("Falling in Love")	No. 7 Gaon Album Chart
2014	Uniq	EOEO	Co-producer ("Born To Fight")	winner of Apollo Music Award for Best Movie Track
2015	Super Junior	Devil	Co-producer ("Simply Beautiful")	No. 2 Gaon Album Chart
2015	Up10tion	Top Secret	Co-producer ("So, Dangerous")	No. 9 Album (Gaon Music Chart)
2015	Up10tion	Top Secret	Co-producer ("Take A Shot")	
2015	Taeyeon	I	Co-producer ("Stress")	No. 1 US World Album (Billboard); No. 1 Taiwan (Five Music Taiwan); No. 1 Gaon Album; No. 5 US Heat Seekers Albums (Billboard); No. 14 on Gaon Chart
2015	Hotshot	Am I Hotshot?	Co-producer ("Watch Out")	No. 18 on Mnet Chart
2015	Hotshot	Am I Hotshot?	Co-producer ("Take A Shot")	
2015	Oh My Girl	Oh My Girl	Co-producer ("Cupid")	No. 6 on Gaon Chart; No. 12 on Mnet Chart No. 12 on Mnet Chart
2015	History	Beyond the History	Co-producer ("Mind Game")	
2015	Speed	Speed On	Co-producer ("What U")	
2015	Uniq	EOEO	Co-producer ("EOEO")	No. 16 on US Billboard Charts
2015	Uniq	EOEO	Co-producer ("Listen to Me")	
2015	Uniq	Best Friend	Co-producer ("Best Friend")	No. 25 on CHN Billboard Charts
2015	Teen Top	Red Point	Co-producer ("Warning Sign")	No. 47 on Gaon Chart; No. 1 Album (Gaon Album Chart); No. 1 Music Bank (1/29/16); No. 1 The Show (1/26/16)
2016	Dean	130 Mood: TRBL	Co-producer ("What2Do" ft. Crush, Jeff Bernat)	No. 41 on Gaon Chart; No. 10 Album (Gaon Album Chart); No. 22 Album (Billboard US Heatseekers Albums); No. 3 Album (Billboard US World Albums)
2016	Dean	130 Mood: TRBL	Co-producer ("D (Half Moon)" ft. Gaeko)	No. 15 on Gaon Chart; No. 2 on Billboard Twitter Emerging Artists Chart; No. 33 on Billboard Twitter Top Tracks Chart; Nominated for "Song of the Year" (MAMA 2016); No. 10 Album (Gaon Album Chart); No. 22 Album (Billboard US Heatseekers Albums); No. 3 Album (Billboard US World Albums)
2016	Boys Republic	BR:evolution	Co-producer ("Eyes On Me")	No. 14 Album (Gaon Album Chart)
2016	Up10tion	Spotlight	Co-producer ("Attention")	No. 4 Album (Gaon Album Chart); No. 5 Album (Oricon Album Chart)
2016	AOA	Good Luck	Co-producer ("Cherry Pop")	No. 10 Album (Gaon Album Chart)
2016	GFriend	LOL	Co-producer ("Click")	No. 3 Album (Gaon Album Chart); No. 7 Album (Billboard US World Albums)
2016	Heize	And July	Co-producer ("And July" ft. Dean, DJ Friz)	No. 34 on Gaon Chart
2016	Up10tion	Summer Go!	Co-producer ("Magic")	No. 3 Album (Gaon Album Chart)
2016	Unit Sky	소년24 Final Stage	Co-producer ("Bop")	
2016	Monsta X	The Clan Pt. 2 Guilty	Co-producer ("Queen")	No. 2 Album (Gaon Album Chart); No. 77 Album (Japan Hot Albums); No. 3 Album (Billboard US World ALbums); No. 16 Album (Billboard US Top Heatseekers Albums)
2016	Monsta X	The Clan Pt. 2 Guilty	Co-producer ("Be Quiet")	No. 2 Album (Gaon Album Chart); No. 77 Album (Japan Hot Albums); No. 3 Album (Billboard US World ALbums); No. 16 Album (Billboard US Top Heatseekers Albums)
2016	Shinee	1 of 1	Co-producer ("Don't Let Me Go")	No. 87 on Gaon Chart; No. 1 Album (Gaon Album Chart); No. 11 Album (Oricon Album Chart); No. 14 Album (Billboard US Top Heatseekers Albums); No. 2 Album (Billboard US World Albums)
2016	Pentagon	Pentagon	Co-producer ("Smile")	No. 7 Album (Gaon Album Chart)
2016	Exo-CBX	Hey Mama!	Co-producer ("Hey Mama!")	No. 4 on Gaon Chart; No. 7 on Billboard US World Chart; No. 1 The Show (11/15/16) No. 1 Album (Gaon Album Chart); No. 1 Album (Billboard US World Albums); No. 14 Album (Oricon Album Chart)
2017	Uhm Jung-hwa (엄정화)	The Cloud Dream of the Nine	Co-producer ("Watch Me Move")	
2017	AOA	Angel's Knock	Co-producer ("빙빙 (Bing Bing)")	
2017	Sonamoo (소나무)	나 너 좋아헤	Co-producer ("나 너 좋아헤")	
2017	Nie; (니엘)	Love Affair	Co-producer ("나 열나")	
2017	Nie; (니엘)	Love Affair	Co-Producer ("In The Rain (Feat. 스내키 챈)")	
2017	Monsta X	The Clan Pt. 2.5: The Final Chapter	Co-Producer ("5:14 (Last Page)")	No. 2 on Gaon Album Chart; No. 38 on Oricon Chart; No. 97 on Japan Hot Albums; No. 1 on US World Albums Chart; No. 10 on US Heatseekers Albums Chart; No. 31 on US Independent Albums Chart
2017	SF9	Breaking Sensation	Co-Producer ("Easy Love")	No. 5 on Gaon Chart; No. 5 on Billboard US World Chart; No. 5 on Oricon Chart; No. 12 on Billboard Japan HOT 100 Chart
2017	Girl's Day	Girl's Day Everyday #5	Co-Producer ("Love Again")	
2017	Produce 101 S2	I Know You Know	Main Producer	Produce 101 Concept Evaluation
2017	NCT 127	Cherry Bomb	Co-Writer ("Summer 127")	
2017	HALO (헤일로)	Single	Co-Producer ("Flying")	
2017	Cosmic Girls (우주소녀)	Single	Co-Producer, Co-Writer ("KISS ME (키스 미) ")	
2017	GFriend	Rainbow`	Co-Producer, Co-Writer ("Life is A Party")	
2017	Loona Odd Eye Circle	Mix & Match	Co-Writer ("Starlight")	
2017	Taemin	Move	Co-Producer, Co-Writer ("LOVE")	
2017	Super Junior	Play	Co-Producer, Co-Writer ("I do" (두 번째 고백))	
2017	Super Junior	Play	Co-Writer ("Spin Up!")	
2017	Monsta X	The Code	Co-Writer ("Deja Vu")	
2017	Super Junior-D&E	Style	Co-Writer ("You don't go")	
2018	Jeong Se-woon (정세운)	After	Co-Producer, Co-Writer ("No Better Than This")	
2018	Weki Meki	Lucky	Co-Writer ("La La La")	
2018	Weki Meki	Lucky	Co-Writer ("Lucky")	
2018	NCT U	NCT 2018 Empathy	Co-Writer ("YESTODAY")	
2018	Up10tion	Invitation	Co-Writer ("SUPERSTAR")	
2018	Up10tion	Invitation	Co-Writer ("CANDYLAND")	
2018	Monsta X	The Connect: Dejavu	Co-producer ("Lost In A Dream")	No. 2 on Gaon Chart; No. 2 on Billboard's World Albums Chart
2018	HALO (헤일로)	O.M.G	Co-Producer, Co-Writer ("O.M.G")	
2018	A.C.E (에이스)	A.C.E Adventures in Wonderland	Co-Producer, Co-Writer ("Take Me Higher")	
2018	A.C.E (에이스)	A.C.E Adventures in Wonderland	Co-Writer ("Black and Blue")	
2018	Shinee	The Story of Light EP.2	Co-Writer ("독감 (Who Waits For Love)")	
2018	Shinee	The Story of Light EP.3	Co-Producer, Co-Writer ("Tonight")	
2018	Jeong Se-woon	Another	Co-Producer, Co-Writer ("I Wonder")	
2018	Newkidd02	Boy Boy Boy	Co-Writer ("Shooting Star")	
2018	Newkidd02	Boy Boy Boy	Co-Writer ("왼손 (Left Hand)")	
2018	JOHN PARK (존박)	Understand	Co-Producer, Co-Writer ("Understand")	
2018	Up10tion	2018 Special Photo Edition	Co-Writer ("So Beautiful")	
2018	Shasha (샤샤)	What the Heck	Co-Producer, Co-Writer ("What the Heck")	
2018	Oh My Girl	Remember Me	Co-Producer, Co-Writer ("Echo 메아리")	
2018	Zhang Yixing (레이)	Namanana	Co-Writer ("Tattoo / 貝殼女孩")	
2018	Monsta X	Take.1 Are You There?	Co-Producer, Co-Writer ("Myself")	
2019	WayV	The Vision	Co-Writer ("Dream Launch")	
2019	Roh Tae-hyun (노태현)	biRTHday	Co-Writer ("I Wanna Know")	
2019	George (죠지), Coogie (쿠기)	좀 예민해도 괜찮아2 OST Part.2	Co-Writer ("아무말 (Talk Talk Talk)")	
2019	Red Velvet	Sappy	Co-Writer ("Sayonara")	
2019	Unine	Unlock	Co-Writer, Co-Producer ("Like a Gentleman")	
2019	Oh My Girl	The Fifth Season	Co-Writer, Co-Producer ("Case No.L5VE")	
2019	Ha Sung-woon	BXXX	Co-Writer ("BLUE")	
2019	Oh My Girl	Fall in Love	Co-Writer ("Bungee (Fall in Love)")	
2019	Sam Kim	Where's My Money	Co-Writer ("WHERE'S MY MONEY")	
2019	Supernova	Paparazzi	Co-Writer, Co-Producer ("Lost In Love")	
2019	Kwon Jin-ah (권진아)	Shape of Me	Co-Writer, Co-Composer ("6:35pm")	
2019	Super Junior	Time Slip	Co-Writer, Co-Composer ("Somebody New")	
2019	Tomorrow X Together	The Dream Chapter: Magic	Co-Writer, Co-Composer ("20cm")	
2019	Bomin	You & I	Co-Writer ("You & I")	
2019	Ding Zeren	Flawless	Co-Writer ("Flawless")	
2019	Hanin Dhiya	Where is the Love	Co-Writer, Co-Composer ("Where is the Love")	
2019	Exo	Obsession	Co-Writer, Co-Producer ("Groove")	
2020	Super Junior	Timeless	Co-Writer ("Shadow")	
2020	Will Pan	Mr. R&Beats	Co-Writer ("Mr. R&Beats" and "Second Option")	
2020	The Boyz	Reveal	Co-Writer ("Wings")	
2020	MCND	Into the Ice Age	Co-Writer ("ICE AGE")	
2020	Han Seung-woo	Fame	Co-Writer ("I Just Want Love")	
2020	WXWZ	跨越时空走向你	Co-Writer ("Walking to U")	
2020	NIve	bandages Single Album	Co-Producer ("how do i")	
2020	CLC	Helicopter	Co-Writer ("Helicopter")	
2020	Taeyeon	Do You Like Brahms? OST	Composer, Co-Writer ("Kiss Me")	
2020	NIve	2easy (feat. Heize)	Co-Producer ("2easy (ft. Heize)")	
2021	MCND	MCND Age	Co-writer ("Crush")	
2021	WayV	Kick Back	Co-writer ("All For Love")	
2021	Super Junior	The Renaissance	Co-Writer, Co-Producer ("Burn the Floor")	
2021	Super Junior-D&E	Countdown	Co-Writer ("Beautiful Liar")	
2021	Fallen Star	History of Kingdom: Pt. lll. Ivan	Co-Writer ("Fallen Star")	
2021	A.C.E., SHY &Forestella	Christmas Time	Co-Writer ("Christmas Time")	
2021	Ha Sung-woon	Select Shop	Co-Writer ("Magic Word")	
2022	Billlie	The Collective Soul and Unconscious: Chapter One	Co-Writer ("GingaMingaYo (The Strange World)")	
2022	Nathan Scott Lee 李承铉	Three More Words	Co-Write ("Three More Words")	
2022	Nathan Scott Lee 李承铉	Three More Words	Co-Write ("Three More Words (Chinese Version) 冰海旅人")	
2022	OnlyOneOf	Suit dance (Japanese Version)	Co-Write ("Seamless Mind")	
2022	Red Velvet	Bloom	Co-Write ("Color of Love")	
2022	Tempest	It's Me, It's We	Co-Write ("Just a Little Bit")	
2022	UN1TY	So Bad	Co-Write ("So Bad")	
2022	Super Junior	The Road	Co-Write ("My Wish")	
2022	NIve	proLOG?	Co-Write ("OMG, So What?")	
2022	Red Velvet	Bloom	Co-Write ("Sayonara")	
2022	Lim Young-woong	Polaroid	Co-Write ("Polaroid")	
2023	Billlie	GingaMingaYo (the strange world) (Japanese ver.)	Co-Writer ("GingaMingaYo (The Strange World)")	
2023	Yesung	Kimi to Iu Sakura no Hanabira ga Boku no Kokoro ni Maiorita	Co-Write ("僕は変わらず君へと向かう／BOKUWAKAWARAZUKIMIETOMUKAU (Feat. 츠키 of Billlie (빌리)")	
2023	MiSaMo	Masterpiece	Co-Writer ("Do Not Touch")	
2023	The Rampage from Exile Tribe	Summer Riot ～熱帯夜～ / Everest	Co-Writer ("VIP")	
2023	BXB	Chapter 1. our youth	Co-Writer ("Planet")	
2023	BXB	Chapter 1. Our Youth (Twin ver.)	Co-Write (Planet (Twin Ver.))	
2023	Tiara Andini	Flip It Up	Co-Write (Flip It Up)	Ranked #1 in YouTube Music Chart Tiara Won Social Media Artist of the Year 2023
2023	Wheein	IN the Mood	Co-Write (On The Island)	
2023	Will Pan	Nightless Night	Co-Write ("今夜不回家")	
2023	Dolla	New Classic	Co-Producer, Co-Compose ("Classic")	Ranked #1 in YouTube Music Chart
2023	Dolla	New Classic	Co-Producer, Co-Compose ("Bo$$ Up")	
2024	Tiara Andini	Ngeluwihi	Co-Producer, Co-Write ("Ngeluwihi")	Ranked #1 in YouTube Music Chart
2024	Jeff Satur	Space Shuttle No.8	Co-Producer, Co-Write ("Almost Over You")	Spotify Ranked in New Music Friday; Best Male Artist of the Year 2024
2024	Felip	Fake Faces	Co-Producer, Co-Write ("Fake Faces")	Ranked No. 1 on iTunes
2024	Junggigo	Roommates	Co-Write ("Roommates")	
2024	MCND	X10	Co-Write ("Girl Friend")	
2024	Dolla	Here4U	Co-Write ("Here4U" Malay and English Version)	
2024	J_ust (그_냥)	오늘 참 달이 밝다 (To. THE MOON)	Co-Write ("오늘 참 달이 밝다 (To. THE MOON)")	
2024	Chuu	nrv	Co-Producer, Co-Write ("Pink Cloud")	
2024	Davii	Single Album 'As Long As' (해와 달이 없어져도)	Co-Producer, Co-Write ("As Long As" (해와 달이 없어져도))	
2024	Ernie Zakri	Single Album - LUV (feat. Sabronzo)	Co-Write ("LUV (feat. Sabronzo)")	
2024	Twins	We Are Twins	Co-Write ("夢想與夢(Following Your Dreams) (Feat. Joey Yung)")	
2024	ALVN	Between The Lines	Co-Write ("Rescue Me")	
2025	Casper True	Because You Love Me	Co-Write ("Because You Love Me")	
2025	SM Classics	The 1st Digital Album & Brand Film - Across The New World	Co-Write ("으르렁 (GROWL) (ORCHESTRA VER.)")	
2025	Lola Amour	2nd Album [Love On Loop]	Co-Producer, Co-Write ("The End")	
2025	Lola Amour	2nd Album [Love On Loop]	Co-Producer, Co-Write ("The Moment (with KOKORO)")	
2025	Lola Amour	2nd Album [Love On Loop]	Co-Producer, Co-Write ("One Day Away (feat. RIIKI REID) ")	
2025	Lola Amour	2nd Album [Love On Loop]	Co-Producer, Co-Write ("Did My Time")	
2025	Lola Amour	2nd Album [Love On Loop]	Co-Producer, Co-Write ("Misbehave")	
2025	Lola Amour	2nd Album [Love On Loop]	Co-Producer, Co-Write ("With You")	
2025	Lola Amour	2nd Album [Love On Loop]	Co-Producer, Co-Write ("Dance With My Mistakes")	
2025	Lola Amour	2nd Album [Love On Loop]	Co-Producer, Co-Write ("Love On Loop")	
2025	Sheila Majid	Sigle - Moving On	Co-Producer, Co-Write ("Moving On")	
2025	Kenny Khoo	7th Album <Lines>	Co-Producer, Co-Write ("BEFORE THE FINISH LINE")	
2025	Kenny Khoo	7th Album <Lines>	Co-Producer, Co-Write ("Picture Perfect")	
2025	Kenny Khoo	7th Album <Lines>	Co-Producer, Co-Write ("Vegas")	
2025	SM Jazz Trio	1st album "PINK NOTE”	Co-Producer, Co-Write ("으르렁 (Growl) (Jazz Ver.)")	
2025	Will Pan	第十三張個人專輯 - 狂愛	Co-Producer, Co-Write ("leaving without you")	
2025	Will Pan	第十三張個人專輯 - 狂愛	Co-Producer, Co-Write ("leaving without you")	
2025	Will Pan	第十三張個人專輯 - 狂愛	Co-Producer, Co-Write ("LIKE IT LOVE IT")	
2025	Lola Amour & Chen Linong	Single - With You	Co-Producer, Co-Write ("With You")	
2025	Tân binh toàn năng	Tân Binh Toàn Năng	Co-Producer, Co-Write ("SHOW ME (Top 29 Tân Binh Toàn Năng)")	
2025	Tân binh toàn năng	Tân Binh Toàn Năng	Co-Producer, Co-Write ("SHOW ME (feat. Đông Quan, Cường Bạch, Wonbi, Minh Hiếu, Swan Nguyễn, Hoàng Long, Duy Lân, minhtin, Đức Duy, Lâm Anh & Phúc Nguyên)")	
2025	Tân binh toàn năng	Tân Binh Toàn Năng	Co-Producer, Co-Writer ("EXPOSURE (feat. Cường Bạch, Wonbi, Long Hoàng, Duy Lân, minhtin, Phúc Nguyên)")	
2025	Tân binh toàn năng	Tân Binh Toàn Năng	Co-Producer, Co-Writer ("VACATION (feat. Hồ Đông Quan, Swan Nguyễn, Đức Duy, Lam Anh)")	
2025	Tân binh toàn năng	Tân Binh Toàn Năng	Co-Producer, Co-Writer ("TAKE A SHOT (feat. Cường Bạch, Wonbi, minhtin, Phúc Nguyễn, Long Hoàng, Duy Lân, Hồ Đông Quan, Đức Duy, Lam Anh, Swan Nguyễn, Thái Lê Minh Hiếu)")	
2025	Tân binh toàn năng	Tân Binh Toàn Năng	Co-Producer, Co-Writer ("TAKE U HOME TONIGHT (feat. Duy Lân, Đức Duy, Lâm Anh, Phúc Nguyên, Hoàng Long, Wonbi, Thái Lê Minh Hiếu, Cường Bạch, Swan Nguyễn, Hồ Đông Quan)")	
2026	Tân binh toàn năng	Tân Binh Toàn Năng	Co-Producer, Co-Writer ("What It Feels Like (CHÍNH LÀ CẢM GIÁC NÀY) (feat. Cường Bạch, Wonbi, Lâm Anh, Long Hoàng & Thái Lê Minh Hiếu) ")	
2026	Tân binh toàn năng	Tân Binh Toàn Năng	Co-Producer, Co-Writer ("TEMPLE (feat. Cường Bạch, Wonbi, Phúc Nguyên, Đức Duy, Lâm Anh, Thái Lê Minh Hiếu, Long Hoàng & Duy Lân)")	
