= The Vision (single album) =

2019 single album by WayV

Single album by WayV
- Released: January 17, 2019
- Recorded: 2018–19
- Genres: Hip-hop; dance pop
- Length: 10:10
- Language: Mandarin
- Labels: Label V; S.M.

WayV chronology
The Vision (2019)	Take Off (2019)

NCT chronology
Regular-Irregular (2018)	The Vision (2019)	Awaken (2019)

Singles from The Vision
- 1. "Regular" Released: January 17, 2019; 2. "Dream Launch" Released: January 24, 2019

The Vision is the debut single album by the Chinese boy band WayV, released in January 2019. (Note: Despite its release only containing three tracks totaling ten minutes, it was marketed as an extended play rather than a single.) It was released by Label V for digital download on January 17, 2019. The EP marks the first NCT unit to debut since NCT Dream in 2016, and the debut of members Xiaojun, Hendery, and Yangyang.

== Background ==
WayV was first announced on August 12, 2018, under the working title, NCT China. Their debut date was originally set for November of that year, though no further information was released at the time. In late November, SM announced that Winwin would be pulled from NCT 127's Regulate promotions in order to prepare for the new unit's upcoming release. In late December, the group was revealed to be known as WayV with a 7 member lineup debuting in January 2019.

After a series of video teasers released on YouTube, the album title and lead single title were released on January 12. The MV teaser was released on January 16 via SMTOWN's YouTube channel.

The Vision included two Chinese versions of songs previously released by NCT 127, "Regular" and "Come Back", and one original song, "Dream Launch".

== Reception ==
"Regular" peaked at number nine on the Chinese QQ chart, and number three on the US World chart. "Dream Launch" peaked at numbers 15 and 6, respectively.

== Track listing ==
The Vision track listing
No.	Title	Lyrics	Music	Arrangement	Length
1.	"Regular" (Chinese: 理所当然; pinyin: Lǐsuǒdāngrán; lit. 'Goes without Saying')	Matthew Yen	Mike Daley; Mitchell Owens; Wilbart 'Vedo' McCoy III; George Kranz; Yoo Young-jin	Daley; Owens	3:38
2.	"Come Back" (Chinese: 噩梦; pinyin: Èmèng; lit. 'Nightmare')	Yen	Daley; Owens; Michael Jiminez; Deez; MZMC; Jeremy "Tay" Jasper	Daley; Owens	3:25
3.	"Dream Launch" (Chinese: 梦想发射计划; pinyin: Mèngxiǎng Fāshè Jìhuà; lit. 'Dream Launch Plan')	Xiaohan	Hyuk Shin (Joombas); Sun (Joombas); Bae Min-soo (Joombas); Jeff Lewis	Joombas	3:47
Total length:					10:10
