= The Moment of Illusion =

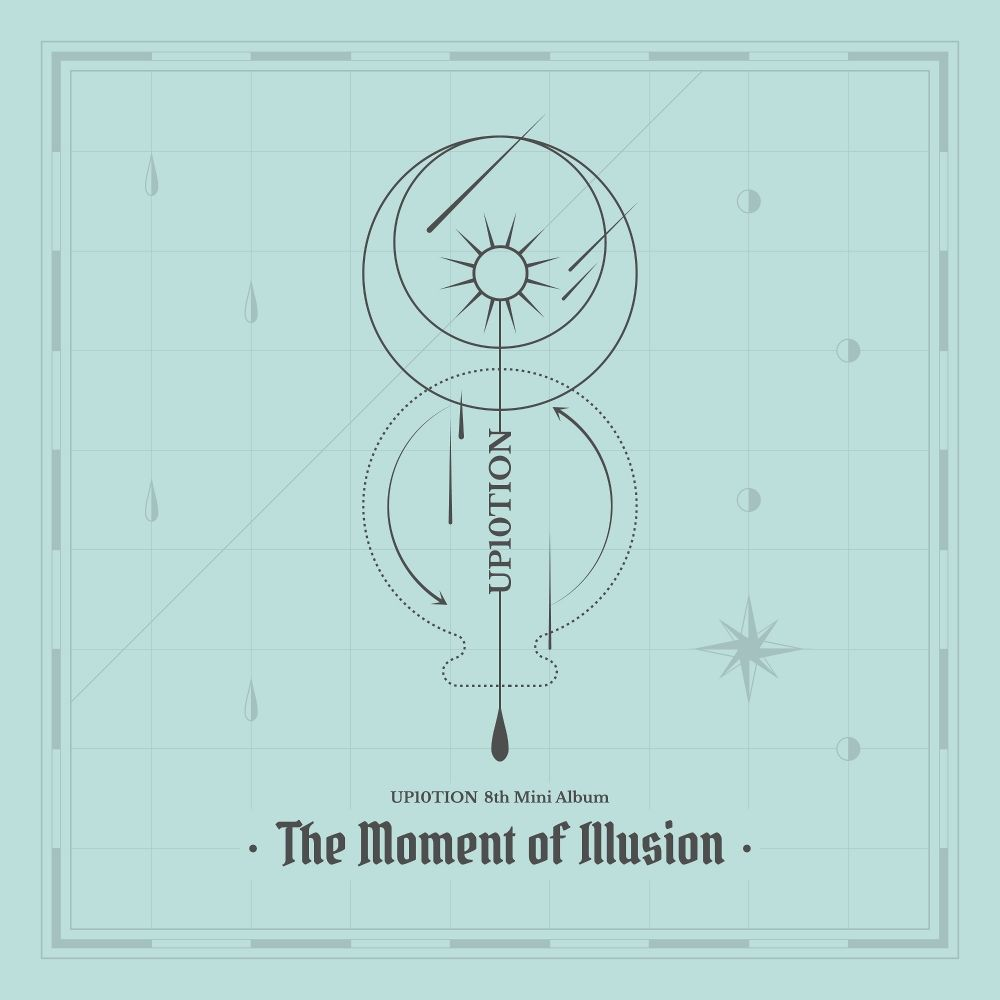

EP by UP10TION
- Released: August 22, 2019
- Genres: K-pop; dance
- Length: 19:49
- Language: Korean
- Labels: TOP Media; Kakao M
- Producer: Top Media

UP10TION chronology
Laberinto (2018)	The Moment of Illusion (2019)	Light Up (2020)

Singles from Your Gravity
- 1. "Your Gravity" Released: August 22, 2019

The Moment of Illusion is the eighth extended play from South Korean boy band UP10TION. It was released on August 22, 2019, by TOP Media. The album consists of six tracks including the title track "Your Gravity". This is also the first album without Lee Jin-hyuk and Kim Woo-seok and Jinhoo's last album he has promoted with the group and has been on hiatus since then.

== Background ==
At the start of 2019, UP10TION continued to promote their previous album "Laberinto" with its title track "Blue Rose". which was released on December 6. They ended the promotion on January 11 at Music Bank. They started to promote their album in Japan starting January 19 at Yamano Hall and January 27 at IMP Hall with its showcase. They also release their schedules for performing at events from January 20 to February 3. The group stop their activities as 10 with Lee Jin-hyuk and Kim Woo-seok partipcaing in Produce X 101. With the remaining 8 members, they continued to perform events around South Korea and begin their 4th tour in US titled "Laberinto Tour in North America" which lasted between May 31 through June 9.

On July 27, TOP Media announced that Jinhyuk and Wooseok will not participate in this album due to their schedules. Due to Wooseok debuting with X1 and Jinhyuk joining too late to participate in the album. The group continued with its 8 members: Jinhoo, Kuhn, Kogyeol, Bitto, Sunyoul, Gyujin, Hwanhee and Xiao.

== Release and promotion ==
TOP Media released the comeback schedule for the album on August 8 through UP10TION's social media.

On August 22, UP10TION released the music video "Your Gravity" for the title track. They held their showcase at CKL Stage.

Leader Jinhoo said during the showcase:

"This is our first mini-album as a 8 member group but we have prepared hard for this and I hope the audience would love what we show in the album".

They then started their promotion period, first on M Countdown, Music Bank, Show! Music Core and Inkigayo. Jinhyuk visited the group on the 23rd to support their comeback. The promotions continued for 4 weeks until their final stage on September 13.

== Concept and album packaging ==
The concept is described as "A Midsummer Night's Dream". The album have two versions, "Moment" and "Illusion". In the "Moment" version, the members are shown as if they traveling are friends who are in a free-spirited atmosphere and more refreshing way. The clothes they're wearing are standing out with its colors. The album cover comes in a teal green color. The "Illusion" version, the members are shown in their chic side. A fantasy world in a dream. The members are wearing clothes that are fairy and aristocrat. The photobook creates a strange atmosphere. The album cover is in a black and white color.

The 2 versions each had a CD, an 88-page photobook, 1 photo card and a circle photocard.

== Songs ==
The first song is "Your Gravity" which serves as the title track of the album is a dance-pop genre song. It's described off first with "piano intro" mixing it with an addictive chorus as it builds up to its peak at the end. It's also refreshing and a catchy song. Like the theme in the song, "Gravity" talks about strength so close and centered. The second song, "Sky Surfer" is described with R&B and the coin flipping in the beginning with its addictive melody and the sophisticated beat guitar sound. The song talks about the innocence's of a person is deeply in love with the sky and sea, an excitement as they would fly away with a loved one. The next and third song, "Look At Me" is way different from the other two songs. The acoustic guitar along with the synth sound and drums together gives it a trendy and sophisticated feel. The song has jazz beats which makes the song feel dreamy. The member's smoothly voices perfectly fit the song you want to listen to when the sunset is setting. The fourth song, "Skyway" has a somewhat classic beat with the classic pop. It has a outer space vibe with a powerful vocal melody. The fifth song, "Restore" was written and composed by Jinhoo. The song contains R&B based mid tempo. The song talks about the nostalgic feeling of a person who did not forget about their breakup. The members colors shine in this song. The final and sixth track "Lover" is a powerful hip hop track with its strong synth and heavy drum beat. The song has a complete different vibe from their other tracks in the album as in the lyrics it says "I just want to be lover".

== Commercial performance ==
The album sold 34,842+ copies in South Korea of 2019. It peaked number 5 on the 35th week of Gaon Album Charts. On the Monthly Chart, it sold 13,664 sales in August, peaking at number 17. In September, it sold 14,336 sales, totaling 28,000 copies at number 9. Lastly, in October, it dropped 32 places at number 41 with another 6,842 copies sold.

== Track listing ==
Official track list

No.	Title	Lyrics	Music	Arrangements	Length
1.	"Your Gravity"	Zomay, 오브로스 (OBROS), Mayfly, Hide Vill, Kuhn, Bitto	Zomay, 오브로스 (OBROS), CHKmate, Mayfly, Hide Vill	오브로스 (OBROS), CHKmate	3:12
2.	"Sky Surfer"	Zomay, 오브로스 (OBROS), Erskineville, Kuhn, Bitto	오브로스 (OBROS), Zomay, SEAN OH, 네버엔드 (NeverEnd), J-Rod, 태동 (Taedong)	SEAN OH, 오브로스 (OBROS), 네버엔드 (NeverEnd), 태동 (Taedong)	3:19
3.	"Look At Me"	Ryan IM, Moon Kim (153/Joombas), EJO IM, KYUM LYK (153/Joombas), Ovrlap (153/Joombas), Kuhn, Bitto	Ryan IM, Moon Kim (153/Joombas), EJO IM, KYUM LYK (153/Joombas), Ovrlap (153/Joombas)	Ryan IM, Moon Kim (153/Joombas), EIM, KYUM LYK (153/Joombas), Ovrlap (153/Joombas)	3:14
4.	"Skyway"	ZNEE (153/Joombas), Kuhn, Bitto	Daniel Kim, RE:ONE (153/Joombas)	RE:ONE (153/Joombas)	3:10
5.	"Restore"	정진우 (Jinwoo Jung), LongDrive, mOOn, Jinhoo, Kuhn, Bitto	정진우 (Jinwoo Jung), LongDrive, mOOn, Jinhoo, Tip$y	LongDrive, Tip$y, Randyachtz	3:27
6.	"Lover"	박상준 (Sangjoon Park), 이진실 (Jinsel Lee), Kuhn, Bitto	박상준 (Sangjoon Park), 이진실 (Jinsel Lee)	박상준 (Sangjoon Park), 이진실 (Jinsel Lee)	3:20
Total length:					19:42

== Credits and personnel ==
- Jinhoo - vocals, background vocals
- Kuhn - rap, background vocals
- Kogyeol - vocals, background vocals
- Bitto - rap, background vocals
- Sunyoul - vocals, background vocals
- Gyujin - vocals, background vocals
- Hwanhee - vocals, background vocals
- Xiao - vocals, background vocals

== Released history ==
Country	Date	Format	Label
South Korea	August 22, 2019	digital download; streaming	TOP Media, Kakao M
Worldwide	August 22, 2019	digital download; streaming	TOP Media, Kakao M
South Korea	August 26, 2019	CD	TOP Media, Kakao M
Worldwide	August 26, 2019	CD	TOP Media, Kakao M
