= Light Up (EP) =

2020 Extended play by UP10TION

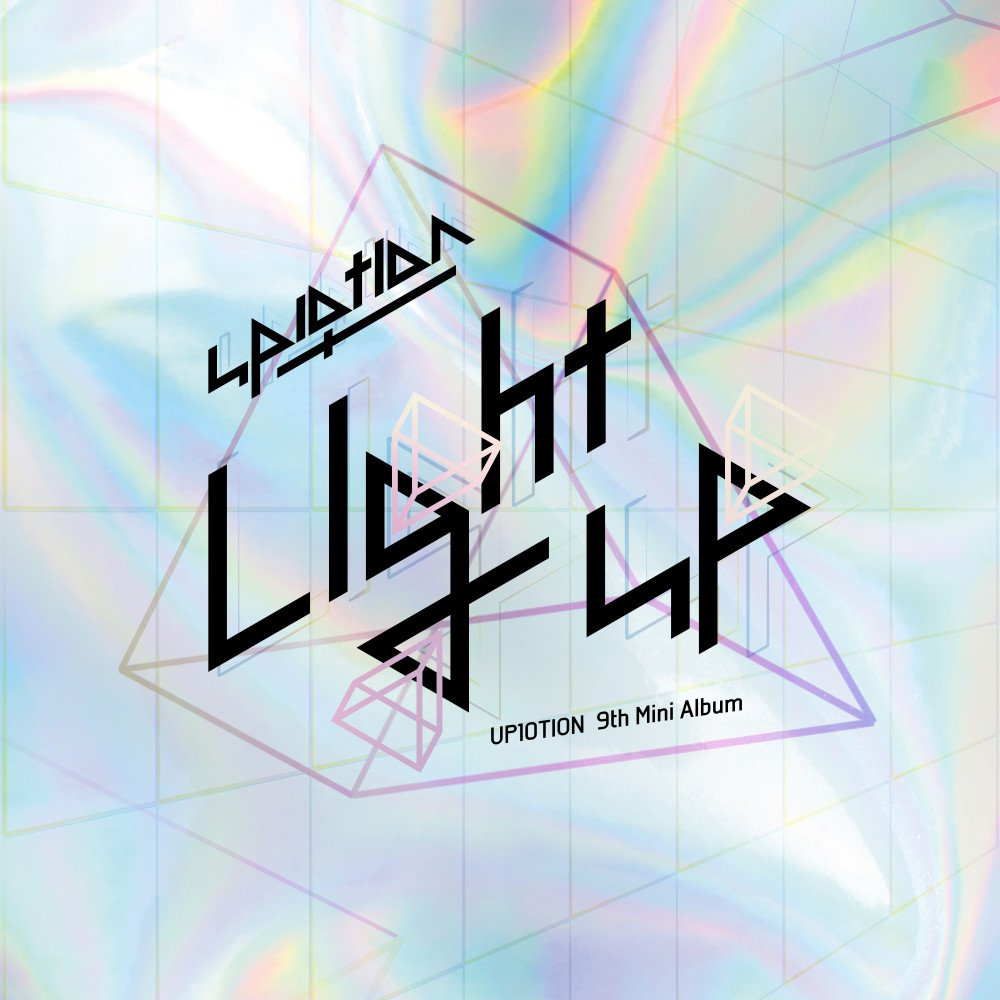
- Digital and "Light Spectrum" version.

EP by UP10TION
- Released: September 24, 2020
- Recorded: mid 2020
- Venues: Seoul, South Korea
- Studio: TOP Media
- Genres: K-pop; EDM
- Length: 20:07
- Language: Korean
- Labels: TOP Media; Kakao M

UP10TION chronology
The Moment of Illusion (2019)	Light Up (2020)	Connection (2021)

Singles from Light Up
- 1. "Light" Released: September 24, 2020; 2. "Destiny" Released: November 27, 2020

Light Up is the ninth extended play from South Korean boy band UP10TION. It was released on September 24, 2020, by TOP Media. The album consists of six tracks including the title track "Light" and promotional single "Destiny".

== Background ==
After the release of "The Moment of Illusion" in August 2019. UP10TION continued promoting and interacting with fans in 2019. Starting in 2020, the group was on a hiatus, greeting fans on V Live time to time. On April 7, 2020, TOP Media announced that band-member Jinhoo would go on a hiatus due to health concerns, leaving the group to continue with remaining members Kuhn, Kogyeol, Bitto, Sunyol, Gyujin, Hwanhee and Xiao. TOP Media also announced that UP10TION would attempt a comeback in the summer of 2020, but then it was delay until September 2020. Member Sunyoul appeared on "MBN Voice Trot" during their hiatus. Jinhyuk and Wooseok also were not involved in the creation of this album and have been on hiatus since 2019.

== Release and promotion ==
The first announcement of a comeback was revealed on their Twitter on August 6 titled "Get ready for UP10TION". It included an album pre-talk, recording behind, dance practice behind and jacket preview expanding August 13 to September 3. All of was released through UP10TION's YouTube channel.

On September 4, 2020, TOP Media released the schedule for UP10TION's ninth mini-album "Light Up". On September 23, 2020, UP10TION released the music video for the eponymous single, "Light". They held a "Rooftop Live" and performed one of their side, "I See You (Waiting For You)" along with the title song "Light". The album was released on various websites digitally and physically. The music video took 30 hours to be filmed. The group promoted the record for four weeks from September 23 to October 17 on M Countdown, Music Bank, Show! Music Core and Inkigayo.

On October 8, in an interview with various medias, member Kuhn said:

"I would like to thank all the HONEY10s who have been waiting for a long time. It's been a long time since we made a comeback, so I'm unusually nervous".

On November 10, TOP Media announced UP10TION was to release a second single, "Destiny" after it was picked by fans via online vote. The music video was released on November 27. The group began promotion of the single by appearing on Show! Music Core and Inkigayo, but this promotional cycle was halted after Bitto tested positive for COVID-19 on November 30. Kogyeol additionally tested positive on December 1 and Xiao tested positive on December 15.

As of December 30, all of three members have recovered from COVID-19.

== Concept and album ==
The members revealed they have been working on the album for a very long time. In an interview with Pops in Seoul, Gyujin said the concept of the album is there are seven light hunters trying to chase for light. Once they chased the light, they realized they're one another's light, illuminating each other. Melon also described the concept for this album "UP10TION transformed into light hunters who purse the light".

The album had two versions, "Light Spectrum" and "Light Hunter". In "Light Hunter" version, the members lost their light and show variety images of the lost. The members are present in black suits with strong charisma. In "Light Spectrum" version, the members have discovered the light with various color suits.

Each version of the album had an 80-page booklet with 1 photocard, 1 tarot card, 1 bookmark and a CD.

== Songs ==
Kuhn was co-credited with writing all six songs, while Bitto was co-credited on five songs on the albums.

The first track, "Light" is the title track of the album and was written and produced by Choi Hyun-Joon and Kim Seung Soo. It's described with a "catchy house" with "electric guitars" with refreshing and cool "synth sounds". "Destiny" is a bright up light song with whistling and finger snapping. The song has a groovy feeling to it. "Stop The Clock" has been a song the group has been wanting to release for a long time. The song shifts from a slow pace before a fast pace at the chorus with an attractive feeling to it. "Dawn" has a tropical sound at first before shifting into a somewhat EDM with Spanish guitar sounds. "Waiting For You" is a sentimental song. The lyrics described by Kuhn as "How I see you whenever I go. It describes a person in love". The last track of the album, "Empty House" first has a mellow tempo and a jazzing piano playing before the mood of the song slightly increases. The song also shows the harmonization of the member's vocals and the whisper raps.

== Commercial performance ==
The EP sold 52,048+ copies in South Korea in 2020. It peaked at number four on the 40th week of Gaon Album Chart. On the Monthly chart, it peaked at 20 on Gaon Monthly Charts of September with 24,974 copies sold and October 2020 with the same ranking with an additional 23,721 copies sold. It dropped 62 places in November with an additional 3,353+ copies sold before it dropped out of the charts.

== Track listing ==
Official track list
No.	Title	Lyrics	Music	Arrangements	Length
1.	"Light"	최현준, 김승수, Kuhn, Bitto	최현준, 김승수	최현준, 김승수	3:28
2.	"Destiny"	$UN, Kuhn, Bitto	$UN, Moon Kim, 배민수, $aimon	배민수, $UN, $aimon	3:05
3.	"Stop The Clock"	미성 (Music Cube), Kuhn, Bitto	Simon Janlov, MLC	Simon Janlov for Hitfire Production (Simon Janlov)	3:13
4.	"Dawn"	YOSKE, Alive Knob, Kuhn, Bitto	이민영 (Eastwest), YOSKE, Holy M	이민영 (Eastwest), Holy M	3:38
5.	"Waiting For You"	오브로스 (OBROS), zomay, real-fantasy, MAYFLY, Kuhn, Bitto	오브로스 (OBROS), zomay, real-fantasy, MAYFLY	오브로스 (OBROS), real-fantasy, zomay	3:18
6.	"Empty House"	Choi Jeon Gun (Ryan IM), Kuhn	Choi Jeon Gun (Ryan IM), 1Hz	Choi Jeon Gun (Ryan IM), 1Hz	3:25
Total length:					20:07

== Credits and personnel ==
- Kuhn - rap, background vocals
- Kogyeol - vocals, background vocals
- Bitto - rap, background vocals
- Sunyoul - vocals, background vocals
- Gyujin - vocals, background vocals
- Hwanhee - vocals, background vocals
- Xiao - vocals, background vocals

== Release history ==
Country	Date	Format	Label
South Korea	September 24, 2020	CD; digital download; streaming	TOP Media, Kakao M
Worldwide	September 24, 2020	CD; digital download; streaming	TOP Media, Kakao M
