= 2017 Special Photo Edition =

2017 Extended play by UP10TION

- Digital cover

EP by UP10TION
- Released: October 12, 2017
- Recorded: 2017
- Venues: Seoul, S. Korea
- Studio: TOP Media Studios
- Genre: K-pop
- Length: 9:37
- Language: Korean
- Labels: TOP Media; LOEN Entertainment

UP10TION chronology
Stardom (2017)	2017 Special Photo Edition (2017)	Invitation (2018)

Singles from 2017 Special Photo Edition
- 1. "Going Crazy" Released: October 12, 2017

2017 Special Photo Edition is the first special extended play from South Korean boy band UP10TION. It was released on October 12, 2017, by TOP Media. The album consists of three tracks, including the title track, "Going Crazy".

== Music video and commercial performance ==
The music video of "Going Crazy" was released on October 12, 2017 as of 2021 the video garned over 2 million views.

The EP sold 22,392+ copies in South Korea. It peaked at number 9 on the Korean Gaon Chart.

== Track listing ==
Official track list
No.	Title	Lyrics	Music	Arrangements	Length
1.	"Going Crazy" (미치게 해)	Nassun; Gr8moon	Rich Jang; Nassun; Dono S.Rodriguez; EJ Show	Rich Jang; EJ Show	3:29
2.	"Come Back To Me" (그대 내게 다시)	Real-fantasy; Obros; Zomay; Mayfly; Kuhn; Wei; Bitto	Real-fantasy; Obros; Zomay	Real-fantasy; Obros; Zomay	3:37
3.	"Going Crazy" (미치게 해)		Rich Jang; Nassun; Dono S.Rodriguez; EJ Show	Rich Jang; EJ Show	3:29
Total length:					11:00
