= Bravo! (EP) =

2015 Extended play by UP10TION

EP by UP10TION
- Released: November 27, 2015
- Genre: K-pop
- Language: Korean
- Label: TOP Media; LOEN Entertainment

UP10TION chronology
Top Secret (2015)	Bravo! (2015)	Spotlight (2016)

Singles from Bravo!
- 1. "Catch Me!" Released: November 27, 2015

Bravo! is the second extended play from South Korean boy band UP10TION. It was released on November 27, 2015, by TOP Media. The album consists of six tracks, including the title track, "Catch Me!".

== Commercial performance ==
The EP sold 31,611+ copies in South Korea. It peaked at number 5 on the Korean Gaon Chart.

== Track listing ==
Official track list
No.	Title	Lyrics	Music	Arrangements	Length
1.	"Bravo!"		Seo Yong-bae	Seo Yong-bae	0:58
2.	"Catch Me!" (여기여기 붙어라)	Yi Gi; Yong-bae; Bluesun	Yi Gi; Yong-bae; Bluesun	Yi Gi; Bluesun	3:15
3.	"Ditto" (나두)	Park Chang-hyun	Park Chang-hyun	Park Chang-hyun; Kim Dae-woon	3:18
4.	"Call Me" (불러)	Kim Won	Kim Won	Kim Won	3:33
5.	"Holic"	Daniel Kim; 110403	Daniel Kim; Hanif Hitmanic Sabzevari; Dennis DeKo Kordnejad; Pontus PJ Ljung	Hanif Hitmanic Sabzevari; Dennis DeKo Kordnejad; Pontus PJ Ljung	3:25
6.	"Party2nite"	Changjo	Jeon Sang-hwan; Changjo	Jeon Sang-hwan; Park Jae-min	3:14
Total length:					18:00
