= 2018 Special Photo Edition =

2018 Extended play by UP10TION

- Digital and standard cover

EP by UP10TION
- Released: August 20, 2018
- Recorded: 2018
- Venues: Seoul, S. Korea
- Genre: K-pop
- Length: 13:58
- Language: Korean
- Labels: TOP Media; Kakao M

UP10TION chronology
Invitation (2018)	2018 Special Photo Edition (2018)	Laberinto (2018)

Singles from 2018 Special Photo Edition
- 1. "So Beautiful" Released: August 20, 2018

2018 Special Photo Edition is the second special extended play from South Korean boy band UP10TION. It was released on August 20, 2018, by TOP Media. The album consists of four tracks, including the title track, "So Beautiful".

== Commercial performance ==
The EP sold 23,320+ copies in South Korea. It peaked at number 3 on the Korean Gaon Chart.

== Track listing ==
Official track list
No.	Title	Lyrics	Music	Arrangements	Length
1.	"So Beautiful"	Oh Ye Jin; Bitto; Wei; Kuhn	Hyuk Shin; $un; Baemin So; JJ Evans	$un; Baemin So	3:24
2.	"All Night Long"	SUN; CALII; Bitto; Wei; Kuhn	SUN; VERSACHO	VERSACHO	3:36
3.	"So Beautiful (Inst.)"	Oh Ye Jin; Bitto; Wei; Kuhn	Hyuk Shin; $un; Baemin So; JJ Evans	$un; Baemin So	3:24
4.	"All Night Long (Inst.)"	SUN; CALII; Bitto; Wei; Kuhn	SUN; VERSACHO	VERSACHO	3:36
Total length:					13:58
