= Spotlight (EP) =

- Digital cover

EP by Up10tion
- Released: April 18, 2016
- Recorded: 2016
- Studio: TOP Studio
- Genre: K-pop
- Language: Korean
- Label: TOP Media; LOEN Entertainment

Up10tion chronology
Bravo! (2015)	Spotlight (2016)	Summer Go! (2016)

Singles from Spotlight
- 1. "Attention" Released: April 18, 2016

Spotlight is the third extended play from South Korean boy band Up10tion. It was released on April 18, 2016, by TOP Media. The album consists of seven tracks, including the lead single "Attention".

== Commercial performance ==
The EP sold 62,848+ copies in South Korea. It peaked at number 4 on the Korean Gaon Chart.

== Track listing ==
Spotlight track listing
No.	Title	Lyrics	Music	Arrangements	Length
1.	"Spotlight"		Beat&Keys	Beat&Keys	1:00
2.	"Attention" (나한테만 집중해)	Hwang Yu-bin	Hyuk Shin; Beat&Keys; Davey Nate; DK; Jusen	Beat&Keys; Jusen	3:17
3.	"Stay"	Kim Dong-yeol; Song Chang-ha; Brand Newjiq	Kim Dong-yeol; Song Chang-ha; Brand Newjiq	Kim Dong-yeol; Song Chang-ha; Brand Newjiq	3:08
4.	"Like Nothing Happened" (아무렇지 않은 척)	Ryan IM; 1Hz	Ryan IM; 1Hz	Ryan IM; 1Hz	3:35
5.	"Yes or No"	Daniel Kim; Steve Wu; Park Ji-yeon	Daniel Kim; Park Ji-yeon; Steve Wu; Joonathan Kettunen	Joonathan Kettunen	3:14
6.	"I Wish a Miracle" (기적을 바란다)	Park Chang-hyun	Park Chang-hyun	Park Chang-hyun	3:51
7.	"Cherish" (보일 듯 말 듯)	Cosmic Sound (RBW); Premium Project; Ssengirl	Cosmic Sound (RBW); Premium Project	Cosmic Sound (RBW); Premium Project, Kang Min-hun	3:06
Total length:					22:00

== Charts ==
Chart performance for Spotlight
Chart (2016)	Peak position
Japanese Albums (Oricon)	5
South Korean Albums (Gaon)	4
