= Odd Youth =

South Korean girl group

- Origin: South Korea
- Years active: 2024–present
- Label: TOP Media
- Members: Maika; Myah; Kanie; Summer; Ye Eum

Odd Youth (Korean: 오드유스, stylized in all caps) is a five-member South Korean girl group under TOP Media. TOP Media's first girl group; the group officially debuted on November 1, 2024, with the single "Best Friendz".

== Name ==
Their official fandom is called ODYz (오디즈). The group's name signifies a gathering of young people with unique personalities, authentically sharing their youthful stories, even if they might seem "strange" to others.

== History ==
=== Debut with Best Friendz, and I Like You ===
On November 1, 2024, Odd Youth debuted with the single album Best Friendz, with the lead single "That's Me." The group made their debut stage performance on SBS Inkigayo on November 3, receiving positive reviews from entertainment media for their performance. In January 2025, the group promoted their song "Best Friendz" on South Korean music programs, including M Countdown, Music Bank, Show! Music Core, and Inkigayo. On January 15, 2025, the group released an English version of "Best Friendz".

On April 15, Odd Youth released their first extended play, I Like You, consisting of five songs: "Spooky", "I Like You", "Bubble Bubble", "Hot Chicken", and "Bestie". On April 6, two members, Summer and Myah, performed the ceremonial first pitch at the Kiwoom Heroes home game at Gocheok Sky Dome.

On March 12, Odd Youth released their second single album, Babyface, The members shared their vision for a more mature image with Babyface. The first-week sales of Babyface surpassed the group's previous sales record obtained with I Like You. On July 4, they held their first fan meeting titled "That's Odd Youth" at Gavin Art Hall in Seoul. On August 19, Odd Youth released their third single album, "Can't Go Back". On August 23, the group performed at the "Coex On Stage" outdoor event at Millennium Square, COEX.

== Members ==
- Maika
- Myah
- Kanie
- Summer
- Ye Eum

== Discography ==
=== Extended plays ===
Title	Details
Best Friendz	Released: November 1, 2024; Label: Top Media; Formats: CD, digital download, streaming; Track listing: "Best Friendz"; "That's Me"
Babyface	Released: March 12, 2026; Label: Top Media; Formats: CD, digital download, streaming; Track listing: "Babyface"; "Candy.exe"
Can't Go Back	Released: August 19, 2026; Label: Top Media; Formats: CD, digital download, streaming; Track listing: "Can't Go Back"; "Happy"

=== Extended plays ===
Title	Details
I Like You	Released: April 15, 2025; Label: Top Media; Formats: CD, digital download, streaming; Track listing: "Spooky"; "I Like You"; "Bubble Bubble"; "Hot Chicken"; "Bestie"

=== Singles ===
Title	Year	Album
"That's Me"	2024	Best Friendz
"I Like You"	2025	I Like You
"Babyface"	2026	Babyface
"Can't Go Back"	2026	Can't Go Back

== Awards ==
Year	Prize	Category	Result
2025	KM Chart	Rookie of the Year	Won
