= UN1TY =

Indonesian boy band

- Origin: Jakarta, Indonesia
- Genres: Indo pop; Hip-hop; teen pop
- Years active: 2019–2025
- Label: Kapital
- Past members: Farhan Helmy Hasan Ali Jawas; Muhammad Gilang Dika Perdana Bakhri; Fikih Rezki Zainuddin; Fenly Christovel Wongjaya; Ahmad Maulana Fajri; Muhammad Fikih Aulia; Shandy Maulana; Zweitson Thegar Setyawijaya

UN1TY (English: unity; yoo·nee·tee) were an Indonesian boy band formed and managed by Kapital Entertainment. The group was composed of eight members: Farhan, Gilang, Fiki, Fajri, Fenly, Ricky, Shandy, and Zweitson. Ricky is their former member, officially left on November 3, 2022, but being announced officially on December 14, 2022. UN1TY has started their debut with two released singles titled Coba Cintaku and Satu on December 9, 2019. Coba Cintaku reached 43rd rank on the Billboard Indonesia Top 100 and 19th rank on the Langit Musik Top 50 January 2020 edition. Satu reached 4th rank on Indonesia 20 15th edition by I-Radio Jakarta.

UN1TY's name is a reference to Indonesia's national motto, Bhinneka Tunggal Ika (Unity in Diversity). The name represents teamwork and a desire to unite music fans.

== Debut era ==
=== Formation ===
UN1TY started their debut under Famous All Stars through a music survival show by 1ID Music created by Dien Tirto Buwono, the business innovation director & co-founder of Famous All Stars (FAS), and Patrick Effendy. After the camp opened their survival program on June 18, 2019, it eliminated and selected more than 500 candidates, until eight remaining candidates: Fajri, Farhan, Fenly, Fiki, Gilang, Ricky, Shandy, and Zweitson, coming from many different ethnic backgrounds with an age range of 16 to 23 years old. This member formation was chosen because it was considered to have musical chemistry and perfect personality fusion to create a synergy based on the producer's vision.

=== Early career ===
UN1TY began their debut by launching two singles entitled Coba Cintaku and Satu (The One). According to digital music download, Coba Cintaku was launched on December 9, 2019, and Satu released on December 10, 2019. Coba Cintaku was written by Patrick Effendy, Bianca Nelwan, and Dimas Wibisana, while Satu was written only by Patrick Effendy. Coba Cintaku succeeded in reaching 43rd rank on Billboard Indonesia Top 100 a month after the song was released and 19th rank on Langit Musik Top 50 January 2020 edition shortly afterwards. Similar to its counterpart, Satu managed to reach 4th rank on Indonesia 20 15th edition by I-Radio Jakarta.

UN1TY releasing their third single titled Pangeran Tidur (Sleeping Prince) on March 17, 2020. The song was written by Patrick Effendy and Dimas Wibisana.

On July 29, 2020, UN1TY releasing their fourth single titled Terbunuh Sepi (Killed by the Silence). The song was written by UN1TY members Patrick Effendy and Ifa Fachir. The song itself talking about loneliness, pointing out directly to teenager's inferiority complex caused by anxiety, depression, and an inferiority complex that could make a teenager not trust themselves.

Fifth single of UN1TY entitled No Mellow! released in digital streaming platforms on September 23, 2020, but the music video is released on September 25, 2020, on YouTube. The music video was recorded only with smartphone, showing the dynamic and playful choreography as what the electronic pop-funk genre does, and the encouraging lyrics to reaching the listener's dream without hearing what other says. No Mellow! was written and created by UN1TY, Patrick Effendy, and STEVESMITH.

== Works ==
=== Music concept ===
For their debut, UN1TY released 8 songs spanning different colors and genres to show each member (as their center) in every turn. This is also the first step for the group to introduce its eight members who have different talents and characters. According to the group, the concept was intended to reflect the Indonesian cultural values that are Bhinneka Tunggal Ika ("Unity in Diversity"), putting an emphasis on diversity. The songs incorporate elect of Indonesian popular music and lyrics that reflect local cultural influences.

=== Music style and genre ===
UN1TY didn't trying to match or resembling South Korean boygroups that are really invaded Indonesian music industry. This group is performed with easy-listening pop music in the style of Indonesian pop music and Indonesian-dominated lyrics. This group has the similar type of music color and genre with M.E, Trio Libels, AB Three, and Warna, compared to some other popular boygroup songs.

== Philanthropy ==
On April 1, 2020, UN1TY and V Live Indonesia create a V Paket #DiRumahAja campaign based on government's advice to stay at home during the COVID-19 pandemic. Through this program, the fans could meet their idol from the content given by them.

On April 4, 2020, UN1TY performed on donation concert #TAYTB Live Stream Fest attended by Samara Live, MRA Media, and Bank OCBC NISP. This online-based festival is considered as new alternative medium for Indonesia's live event industry in the middle of COVID-19 virus pandemic. This festival is having a collaboration with Yayasan Benih Baik to spread and support for helping Indonesian who susceptible to infected by COVID-19 through giving donations during the festival. These donations is used for funds and Bantuan Langsung Tunai for some needed citizens during the pandemic. Afterwards, on April 18, UN1TY performed on donation concert #ApapunDiRumahAja Live Stream Fest Vol. 2 attended by Samara Live, MRA Media, FAS, and Tehbotol Sosro.

Samara Live, MRA Media, and Bank OCBC NISP. This online-based festival is considered as new alternative medium for Indonesia's live event industry in the middle of COVID-19 virus pandemic. This festival is having a collaboration with Yayasan Benih Baik ti spread and support for helping Indonesian who susceptible to infected by COVID-19 through giving donations during the festival. These donations is used for funds and Bantuan Langsung Tunai for some needed citizens during the pandemic. Afterwards, on April 18, UN1TY performed on donation concert #ApapunDiRumahAja Live Stream Fest Vol. 2 attended by Samara Live, MRA Media, FAS, and Tehbotol Sosro.

== Members ==
Stage name	Birth name	Birth date	Place of birth	Position
Farhan	Farhan Helmy Hasan Ali Jawas	March 20, 1996 (age 30)	Sydney, Australia	Leader, Rapper
Shandy	Sandy Maulana	August 2, 1996 (age 29)	Manna, Bengkulu	Vocal, Dancer
Gilang	Muhammad Gilang Dika Perdana Bakhri	November 15, 1998 (age 27)	Makassar	Vocal, Dancer, Rapper
Ricky	Fikih Rezki Zainuddin	December 30, 1998 (age 27)	Sydney, Australia	Vocal, Dancer
Fenly	Fenly Christovel Wongjaya	December 6, 1999 (age 26)	Gorontalo	Vocal, Dancer
Fajri	Ahmad Maulana Fajri	July 20, 2002 (age 23)	Jakarta	Vocal, Dancer
Zweitson	Zweitson Thegar Setyawijaya	December 14, 2002 (age 23)	Salatiga	Vocal, Dancer
Fiki	Muhammad Fikih Aulia	August 13, 2003 (age 22)	Palembang	Vocal, Dancer

== Web series ==
Year	Title	Actors	Act role	Channel
2020	Perfect Love	Farhan	Rico	Vidio
2020	Perfect Love	Gilang	Gilang	Vidio
2020	Perfect Love	Fiki	Defano Julian	Vidio
2020	Perfect Love	Fajri	Agil	Vidio
2020	Perfect Love	Ricky	Ricky	Vidio
2020	Perfect Love	Fenly	Faldy	Vidio
2020	Perfect Love	Zweitson	Gerry	Vidio
2020	Perfect Love	Shandy	Shandy	Vidio
2021	31 Hari Dari UN1TY Jadi You Need Me	UN1TY	UN1TY	SCTV

== Discography ==
=== Albums Studio ===
- In Diversity (September 26, 2022)

=== Albums Live ===
- Patah Hati : Awal Terbaik (May 24, 2024)

=== Single ===
- Coba Cintaku (December 10, 2019)
- Satu (February 14, 2020)
- Pangeran Tidur (March 17, 2020)
- Terbunuh Sepi (July 29, 2020)
- No Mellow! (September 23, 2020)
- Restu Waktu (March 31, 2021)
- Baby (July 22, 2021)
- Friendzone (November 5, 2021)
- So Bad (January 25, 2022)
- 8=1 (April 14, 2022)
- It's Alright (July 28, 2022)
- Ya Udah (June 9, 2023)
- Awal Terbaik (October 16, 2025)

=== Music videos ===
- Coba Cintaku (December 9, 2019)
- Satu (February 14, 2020)
- Pangeran Tidur (March 20, 2020)
- Terbunuh Sepi (July 31, 2020)
- No Mellow! (September 25, 2020)
- Restu Waktu (March 31, 2021)
- Baby (July 22, 2021)
- Friendzone (November 5, 2021)
- So Bad (January 25, 2022)
- It's Alright (July 28, 2022)
- Ya Udah (June 9, 2023)
