= Invitation (Up10tion album) =

2018 studio album by UP10TION

- Digital cover

Studio album by UP10TION
- Released: March 15, 2018
- Recorded: 2017–2018
- Studio: Top Media Studios
- Genre: K-pop
- Language: Korean
- Label: TOP Media; Kakao M

UP10TION chronology
Special Photo Edition (2017)	Invitation (2018)	2018 Special Photo Edition (2018)

Singles from Invitation
- 1. "Candyland" Released: March 15, 2018; 2. "Target on" Released: March 15, 2018

Invitation is the debut studio album from South Korean boy band UP10TION. It was released on 15 March 2018, by TOP Media. The album consists of eleven tracks, including the title track, "Candyland", The promotional singles were "Candyland" and "Target on", The album marked their first debut album just after three years after debut.

== Background ==
Starting in 2018, UP10TION released their second Japanese single album "Wild Love". They promoted the album by performing events around Japan and having 3 showcases.

== Mystery codes ==
On February 19, Up10tion first revealed their comeback with a message for their fans on SNS which they wrote "Invite Honey10 in March 2018 from UP10TION". On February 23, UP10TION released a riddle with numbers "9-14-22-9-20-1-20-9-15-14" which in alphabetically is "I-N-V-I-A-T-I-O-N".

On March 2, it was confirmed Up10tion will have a comeback on March 15 with their first full album. They release the comeback schedule for release. On March 8, it was confirmed that Wooshin (now known as Kim Woo-seok) has returned to the group after being on a 9-month hiatus due to his psychological condition worsening. This made UP10TION a full group now. On March 11, UP10TION release "INVITATION TRICK X-CODE" on YouTube which was a code. The words "MARCH", "FIRST", "FULL", "COME", and "BACK" meant their first album, "Invitation". Next, the riddle "JKKWBWSGHX" was the initial of member's first letter of their names (Jinhoo, Kuhn, Kogyeol, Jinhyuk, Bitto, Wooseok, Sunyoul, Gyujin, Hwanhee and Xiao). Next the words were "WE", "ARE", "TEN", completing the group after Wooshin's hiatus. Next was words that were highlighted, meant "ten" in 10 different languages. Lastly, all the words interpret into "CANDYLAND".

== Release and promotion ==
On March 15, Up10tion release the music video for "Candyland" at 6:00 KST with the album being released that same day. They held their showcase Ilchi Art Hall the next day. They started to promoted on March 15 on M Countdown, Music Bank, Show! Music Core and Simply K-Pop. The side track, "Target on" was also promoted but only for 1 week between March 15 and March 18. They promoted for 5 weeks until their goodbye stage on Inkigayo on April 15.

The group started to promote their album in Japan starting April 27 and ending on May 13 which included interacting with their fans.

== Commercial performance ==
The album sold 75,594+ copies in South Korea. It peaked at number 2 on the Korean Gaon Chart.

== Track listing ==
Invitation track listing
No.	Title	Lyrics	Music	Arrangements	Length
1.	"Invitation"		MRey; Daehan (Joombas); JJ Evans	MRey; Daehan (Joombas)	1:07
2.	"Candyland"	Kim Min-ji; Im Jung-hyo	Hyuk Shin; 999; Davey Nate; Jusen; Jayrah Gibson; Ju0	999; Jusen; Ju0	3:07
3.	"Target On" (반해, 안 반해)	Seo Ji-eum	Daniel Kim; Jeremy G (Future Sound); Sionz	Sionz	3:14
4.	"Finally" (오늘이야)	Real-fantasy; Yoske; Bull$Eye; Wei; Bitto	Real-fantasy; Yoske; Bull$Eye	Real-fantasy; Yoske; Bull$Eye	3:20
5.	"Habit" (습관)	Changjo; Heo Sung-jin	Heo Sung-jin; Changjo	Heo Sung-jin	3:39
6.	"Mixed Signals" (모호해)	Sun; Kuhn; Wei; Bitto	Sun; 베르사최	베르사최	3:26
7.	"Always" (이대로)	Zomay; Real-fantasy; Obros; Bello; Kuhn; Wei; Bitto	Real-fantasy; Zomay; Obros; Bello	Real-fantasy; Obros; Zomay	3:30
8.	"Superstar"	Pi Kyung-jin (Joombas)	Hyuk Shin; Reone; Delly Boi; Davey Nate	Reone; Delly Boi	2:58
9.	"Love Sick"	Jang Yeo-jin; Kuhn; Wei; Bitto	Hanif Hitmanic Sabzevari; Mans Ek; Chris Meyer	Hanif Hitmanic Sabzevari; Mans Ek; Chris Meyer	3:06
10.	"Still with You" (시간이 멈춰서)	Moon Kim	Moon Kim; Jung Yoon	Jung Yoon	3:33
11.	"I Need You" (예고 없이)	Ryan	Ryan	Ryan	3:56
Total length:					35:00
