= Up10tion =

South Korean boy group

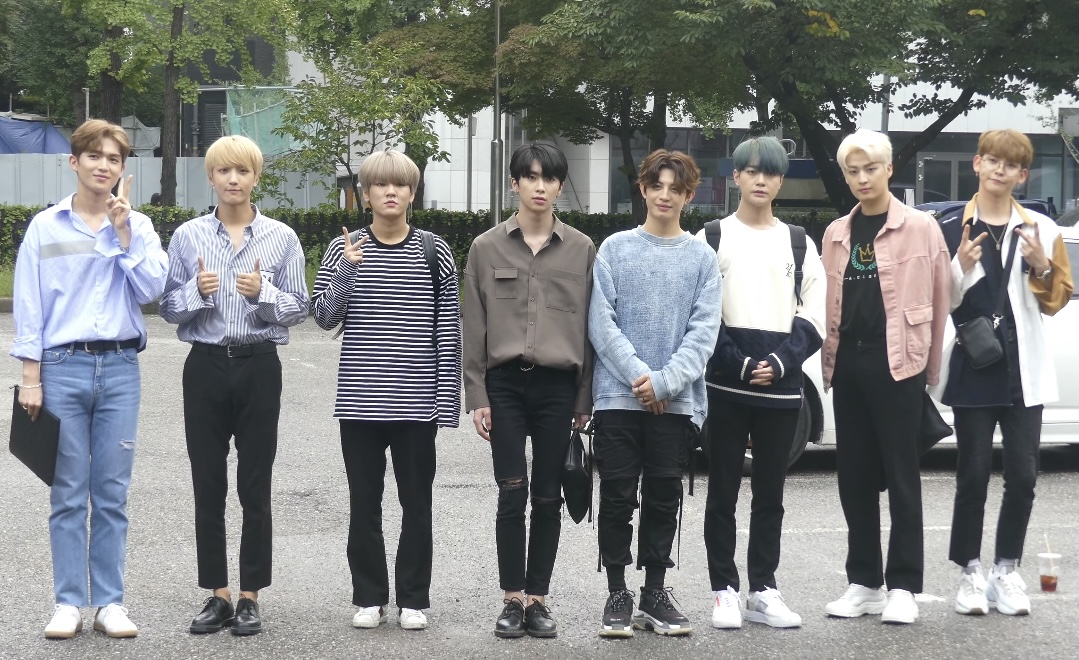
- Up10tion at KBS Music Bank in 2019; L–R: Gyujin, Sunyoul, Hwanhee, Xiao, Jinhoo, Bitto, Kogyeol and Kuhn

Background information
- Origin: Seoul, South Korea
- Genres: K-pop; hip hop; electronica
- Years active: 2015–2022 (Note: Indefinite hiatus)
- Labels: TOP Media; Kiss
- Members: Kuhn; Kogyeol; Bitto; Sunyoul; Gyujin; Xiao; Hwanhee
- Past members: Jinhoo; Jinhyuk; Wooseok
- Website: u10t.co.kr (Korea) up10tion.jp (Japan)

Up10tion (Korean: 업텐션; pronounced eobtensyeon for "up tension", acronym for Unbelievable Perfect 10 members Teenager Idol Open Now) is a South Korean boy band formed by TOP Media in 2015. The group currently consists of seven members: Kuhn, Kogyeol, Bitto, Sunyoul, Gyujin, Hwanhee and Xiao. The group debuted with their first extended play Top Secret. In 2017, they made their Japanese debut with EP ID. Originally as ten, Jinhoo, Lee Jin-hyuk and Kim Woo-seok departed from the group on February 28, 2023.

== History ==
=== Pre-debut ===
In July 2015, Up10tion introduced its members through a parody of MBC's King of Mask Singer.

=== 2015–2016: Debut and early days ===
On September 9, Up10tion held a debut showcase at AX Concert Hall in Seoul which 500 fans attended. Up10tion released their debut EP Top Secret, which includes the debut single "So, Dangerous", was released on September 11, 2015. The album debut at number 9 and peaked at number 7 on Gaon Album Chart. They made their official music program debut on September 10 through Mnet's M Countdown, performing their debut single "So, Dangerous". They also had their debut album showcase in Beijing, China on September 22. The "So, Dangerous" music video was ranked 9th place in Billboard's Most Viewed K-pop Videos in America for the month of September 2015.

On November 26, Up10tion released their second EP Bravo! with the lead single "Catch Me!", which was produced by Iggy and Yong Bae, who produced Ailee's "Heaven" and GFriend's "Me Gustas Tu". It also includes the track "Party2nite", which was written and composed by Teen Top's Changjo. The album peaked at number 5 on Gaon Album Chart.

Up10tion released their third EP Spotlight with the lead single "Attention" on April 18.

On August 5, Up10tion released their fourth EP Summer Go! with the lead single "Tonight".

Up10tion released their fifth EP Burst with the lead single "White Night" on November 21.

=== 2017: Japanese debut and Star;dom ===
Up10tion released their Japanese debut single "ID" (アイディー) on February 27. They launched their first Japan tour titled "Zepp Tour 2017 ID" in May.

On June 6, TOP Media issued a statement regarding Wooseok's hiatus. It was stated that his psychological condition had worsened due to the mental stress that he had been receiving since the end of 2016, due to a controversy that alleged he had inappropriately touched his "The Show" co-host, Jeon So-mi, near her chest area during a video. There were official statements released by both parties' agencies that denied these claims, along with the production staff from "The Show".

With Wooseok on hiatus, Up10tion continued their activities as nine members. They released their sixth EP Star;dom on June 29. The EP contained six tracks, including lead single "Runner". On October 12, the group released 2017 Special Photo Edition, containing two tracks, including lead single "Going Crazy".

=== 2018: Invitation, first world tour and Laberinto ===
On January 20, Up10tion released their second Japanese single album "Wild Love".

On March 15, Up10tion released their first studio album Invitation with title track "Candyland" which contain 10 other tracks. Wooseok returned to the group which ended his 8-month hiatus.

In May, Up10tion started their first tour Up10tion Japan Live Tour 2018. In June, the group started their second tour, "Up10tion 1st US Meet & Live Tour "Candyland" in 8 cities.

On August 8, Up10tion released their third Japan single album "Chaser". On August 20, Up10tion released 2018 Special Photo Edition with the single "So Beautiful".

On September 19, Up10tion started their third tour, Up10tion Europe Tour.

On December 6, Up10tion released their seventh EP Laberinto, with the lead single "Blue Rose".

=== 2019–2020: Produce X 101 and promotion as septet ===
On May 31, Up10tion started their 4th tour "Laberinto Tour in North America" without Wooseok and Jinhyuk. Jinhyuk and Wooseok were contestants on Produce X 101, with Wooseok being a finalist and in August, became a member of the new boy group X1. The group subsequently disbanded due to the Mnet vote manipulation investigation.

On August 22, Up10tion released The Moment of Illusion with the lead single "Your Gravity", which was promoted without Wooseok and Jinhyuk. Jinhyuk meanwhile debuted as a soloist in November.

On April 7, TOP Media announced Jinhoo will go on a hiatus due to health concerns. They also announced the group will be having a summer album but it did not happen until the comeback was announced in late August.

Up10tion's new EP, Light Up with the single "Light", was released on September 24. On November 23, it was announced that Jinhoo would begin his mandatory military service on the same day.

On November 27, Up10tion released "Destiny" which was part of their Light Up album.

On November 29, Bitto tested positive for COVID-19. On December 1, Kogyeol also tested positive for COVID-19. On December 15, Xiao tested positive for COVID-19.

As of December 30, all 3 members have recovered from COVID-19.

=== 2021–2022: Connection, Novella and Code Name: Arrow ===
On June 14, 2021, Up10tion returned with their second studio album Connection with the accompanying lead single "Spin Off".

On January 3, 2022, Up10tion released their tenth EP Novella with "Crazy About You" serving their accompanying track.

On May 22, member Jinhoo was discharged from the military service.

On September 15, Up10tion announced they would come back on October 12, with their eleventh extended play Code Name: Arrow.

=== 2023–present: Boys Planet, line-up changes and departure from TOP Media ===
On December 29, 2022, Hwanhee and Xiao became contestants on Boys Planet. On March 9, it was announced by TOP Media that Hwanhee would be leaving the show permanently due to his health issues.

On February 28, 2023, Lee Jin-hyuk would leaving TOP Media after deciding not to renew his contract which expires on March 11. It was also announced that Kuhn, Kogyeol, Bitto, Sunyoul and Gyujin would also be leaving the agency, but Up10tion would continue with its current seven-member lineup, confirming Jinhoo, Lee Jin-hyuk and Kim Woo-seok departure from the group as well.

In March 2023, TOP Media announced that members Kuhn and Kogyeol will be enlisting in the military on March 27 and April 10, respectively.

On March 20, 2023, Top Media announced that Hwanhee's contract has ended. Xiao subsequently left the agency on March 31, after wrapping up his participation in Boys Planet. He would be the last among the seven current members to depart from the agency.

On the 1st of February 2024 it was announced that Kuhn was discharged from the military due to back pain.

== Members ==
Adapted from their Naver profile

=== Current ===
- Kuhn (쿤) – co-leader, rapper, vocalist
- Kogyeol (고결) – vocalist
- Bitto (비토) – rapper
- Sunyoul (선율) – vocalist
- Gyujin (규진) – vocalist
- Hwanhee (환희) – vocalist
- Xiao (샤오) – vocalist

=== Former ===
- Jinhoo (진후) – leader, vocalist
- Lee Jin-hyuk (formerly known as Wei) (이진혁) – rapper
- Kim Woo-seok (formerly known as Wooshin) (김우석) – vocalist

=== Timeline ===
- Yellow = Active
- Black = Inactive / Hiatus

== Discography ==
=== Studio albums ===
List of studio albums, with selected details and chart positions
Title	Album details	Peak chart positions		Sales
Title	Album details	KOR	JPN	Sales
Invitation	Released: March 19, 2018; Label: TOP Media; Format: CD, digital download	2	14	KOR: 75,594; JPN: 14,872
Connection	Released: June 14, 2021; Label: TOP Media; Format: CD, digital download	3	—	KOR: 49,700

=== Extended plays ===
List of extended plays, with selected chart positions and sales
Title	EP details	Peak chart positions		Sales
Title	EP details	KOR	JPN	Sales
Top Secret	Released: September 11, 2015; Label: TOP Media; Format: CD, digital download	7	—	KOR: 16,249
Bravo!	Released: November 26, 2015; Label: TOP Media; Format: CD, digital download	5	—	KOR: 31,611
Spotlight	Released: April 18, 2016; Label: TOP Media; Format: CD, digital download	4	5	KOR: 62,848; JPN: 18,235
Summer Go!	Released: August 5, 2016; Label: TOP Media; Format: CD, digital download	1	8	KOR: 60,561; JPN: 16,326
Summer Go!	Re-released: September 20, 2016 (as Thank You [limited edition]); Label: TOP Media; Format: CD, digital download	3	—	KOR: 60,561; JPN: 16,326
Burst	Released: November 21, 2016; Label: TOP Media; Format: CD, digital download	1	25	KOR: 83,737; JPN: 10,152
Star;dom	Released: June 29, 2017; Label: TOP Media; Format: CD, digital download	1	18	KOR: 95,523; JPN: 6,483
2017 Special Photo Edition	Released: October 18, 2017; Label: TOP Media; Format: CD, digital download	9	31	KOR: 22,392; JPN: 2,655
2018 Special Photo Edition	Released: August 20, 2018; Label: TOP Media; Format: CD, digital download	3	29	KOR: 23,320; JPN: 3,585
Laberinto	Released: December 6, 2018; Label: TOP Media; Format: CD, digital download	4	17	KOR: 43,126; JPN: 3,737
The Moment of Illusion	Released: August 22, 2019; Label: TOP Media; Format: CD, digital download	5	—	KOR: 34,842
Light Up	Released: September 24, 2020; Label: TOP Media; Format: CD, digital download	4	—	KOR: 52,048
Novella	Released: January 3, 2022; Label: TOP Media; Format: CD, digital download	2	12	KOR: 40,098
Code Name: Arrow	Released: October 12, 2022; Label: TOP Media; Format: CD, digital download	12	—	KOR: 33,073
"—" denotes releases that did not chart or were not released in that region.

=== Singles ===
List of singles, with selected chart positions, showing year released and album name
Title	Year	Peak chart positions					Sales	Certifications	Album
Title	Year	KOR	KOR Hot.	JPN	JPN Hot.	US World	Sales	Certifications	Album
Korean
"So, Dangerous" (위험해)	2015	—	—N/a	—	—	9			Top Secret
"Catch Me!" (여기여기 붙어라)	2015	119	—N/a	—	—	17			Bravo!
"Attention" (나한테만 집중해)	2016	—	—N/a	—	—	3			Spotlight
"Tonight" (오늘이 딱이야 (夜半逃走))	2016	—	—N/a	—	—	1			Summer Go!
"White Night" (하얗게 불태웠어)	2016	—	—N/a	—	—	5			Burst
"Runner" (시작해)	2017	56	—N/a	—	—	18			Stardom
"Going Crazy" (미치게 해)	2017	—	—	—	—	22			2017 Special Photo Edition
"Candyland"	2018	—	—	—	—	9			Invitation
"So Beautiful"	2018	—	—	—	—	29			2018 Special Photo Edition
"Blue Rose"	2018	—	90	—	—	12			Laberinto
"Your Gravity"	2019	—	—	—	—	3			The Moment of Illusion
"Light"	2020	— (Note: "Light" did not enter Gaon Digital Chart, but debuted and peaked at number 38 on Gaon Download Chart.)	—	—	—	15			Light Up
"Destiny"	2020	—	—	—	—	29			Light Up
"Spin Off"	2021	— (Note: "Spin Off" did not enter Gaon Digital Chart, but debuted and peaked at number 26 on Gaon Download Chart.)	—	—	—	4			Connection
"Crazy About You" (너에게 미쳤었다)	2022	— (Note: "Crazy About You" did not enter Gaon Digital Chart, but debuted and peaked at number 15 on Gaon Download Chart.)	—	—	—	18			Novella
"What If Love"	2022	— (Note: "What If Love" did not enter the Circle Digital Chart, but appeared at number 155 on the component Download chart.)	—	—	—	—			Code Name: Arrow
Japanese
"ID" (アイディー)	2017	—	4	3	3		JPN: 159,779 (Phy.)	RIAJ: Gold	Non-album single
"Wild Love"	2018	—	—	3	3	—	JPN: 30,199 (Phy.)		Non-album single
"Chaser"	2018	—	—	2	3	—	JPN: 36,357 (Phy.)		Non-album single
"—" denotes releases that did not chart or were not released in that region.

== Videography ==
=== Music videos ===
Year	Music video	Director
Korean
2015	"So, Dangerous"	Unknown
2015	"Catch Me!"	Unknown
2016	"Attention"	Unknown
2016	"Tonight"	Unknown
2016	"White Night"	Unknown
2017	"Runner"	Unknown
2017	"Going Crazy"	Unknown
2018	"Candyland"	Unknown
2018	"Blue Rose"	Unknown
2019	"Your Gravity"	Unknown
2020	"Light"	Unknown
2020	"Destiny"	Unknown
2021	"Spin Off"	Unknown
2022	"Crazy About You"	Unknown
2022	"What If Love"	Unknown
Chinese
2015	"So, Dangerous"	Unknown
Japanese
2017	"ID"	Unknown
2018	"Wild Love"	Unknown
2018	"Chaser"	Unknown

== Tours ==
- 2017: Up10tion "Zepp Tour 2017 ID"
- 2018: Up10tion JAPAN Live Tour 2018 CANDYLAND
- 2018: Up10tion 1st Us Meet & Live Tour "Candyland"
- 2018: Up10tion Europe Tour
- 2019: Laberinto Tour in North America

== Awards and nominations ==
Name of the award ceremony, year presented, category, nominee of the award, and the result of the nomination
Award ceremony	Year	Category	Nominee / Work	Result	Ref.
Melon Music Awards	2015	Best New Artist	Up10tion	Nominated	
Seoul Music Awards	2017	Bonsang Award	Spotlight	Nominated	
Seoul Music Awards	2017	Hallyu Special Award	Up10tion	Nominated	
Seoul Music Awards	2017	Popularity Award	Up10tion	Nominated	
