= MCND =

South Korean boy band

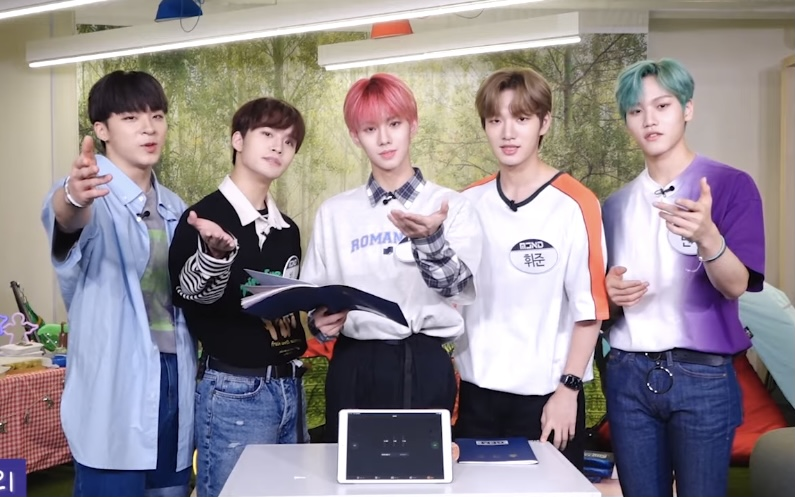
- MCND on ARATV in 2020; L–R: Castle J, Bic, Win, Huijun, Minjae

Background information
- Origin: Seoul, South Korea
- Genres: K-pop; hip hop
- Years active: 2020—present
- Label: TOP Media
- Members: Castle J; Bic; Minjae; Huijun; Win
- Website: itopgroup.com/MCND

MCND (Korean: 엠씨엔디; acronym for "Music Creates New Dream") is a South Korean boy band formed by TOP Media. The group consists of five members: Castle J, Bic, Minjae, Huijun, and Win. They debuted on February 27, 2020, with the extended play (EP) Into the Ice Age.

== History ==
=== 2020: Top Gang, debut with Into the Ice Age, "Spring", and Earth Age ===
On January 2, the group released the hip hop pre-debut single "Top Gang". The single was composed by member Castle J, and was written by Castle J, Bic and Win. The group had performed on Music Bank on December 13 and at Inkigayo on December 15, 2019.

The group made their official debut on February 27, with the EP Into the Ice Age and its lead single "Ice Age". Their debut showcase was held at Seoul's Yes24 Live Hall on February 26. On March 15, they hosted an online fansign, making them one of the first groups to embrace a virtual format for these events. They described the fansign as "a whole new experience."

On April 9, the group returned with the digital single "Spring".

On August 20, the group made their first comeback with the new EP Earth Age and its lead single "Nanana". Notably, an AI hosted their comeback showcase, which the group has described as a "surprising and fun" experience, noting that it felt awkward but went "quite successfully."

The group did their first ever online concert "MCND 1st On:Live" on September 26, 2020, and it finished successfully. They have since called the concert one of their most "precious memories" as a group.

=== 2021: MCND Age and The Earth: Secret Mission Chapter.1 ===
Before making their second comeback, the group took some time off to improve their musical and performance skills. Castle J has shared that he "took vocal lessons [and] studied music a lot," and BIC worked on his performance.

On January 8, the group made their second comeback with their third EP MCND Age and its lead single "Crush". Win has called "Crush" one of his favorite MCND songs to date, saying it "seems to be a song of color that only MCND can release."

On August 31, MCND released their fourth EP The Earth: Secret Mission Chapter.1 and its lead single "Movin'". Win noted that their "worldview has been expanded" since their debut, allowing for more "stories and messages" to emerge in their work.

=== 2022: [1st] MCND Tour and The Earth: Secret Mission Chapter.2 ===
On February 12, MCND had announced their first-ever offline concert titled, ‘MCND EUROPE TOUR 2022’, visiting a total six countries and seven cities.

On March 7, MCND announced their first tour in America. From the beginning of June, MCND will visit 10 cities in four countries including the US, Mexico, Canada and Brazil. This was later pushed back to August due to an administrative error.

On June 11, MCND released a track video titled "W.A.T.1" for their upcoming comeback, and officially released the schedule on June 15. Their fifth EP The Earth: Secret Mission Chapter.2 and its lead single "#Mood" was released on July 7.

On November 19, MCND held their first Asia tour in the Philippines at the SM North EDSA Skydome.

== Members ==
- Castle J (캐슬제이)
- Bic (빅)
- Minjae (민재)
- Huijun (휘준)
- Win (윈)

== Discography ==
=== Extended plays ===
| Title | Details | Peak chart positions | Sales |
| Title | Details | KOR | Sales |
|---|---|---|---|
| Into the Ice Age | Released: February 27, 2020; Label: TOP Media; Formats: CD, digital download, streaming; Track listing: 1. "Into the Ice Age"; 2. "Ice Age"; 3. "Stereotypes"; 4. "Hey You"; 5. "Top Gang" | 8 | KOR: 19,586 |
| Earth Age | Released: August 20, 2020; Label: TOP Media; Formats: CD, digital download, streaming; Track listing: 1. "Intro: Earth Age" (Intro: 푸른별); 2. "Nanana"; 3. "Breathe" (숨쉬어); 4. "Beautiful"; 5. "Galaxy"; 6. "Bumpin'" (쾅쾅쾅); 7. "Outro; Kepler1649c" (Outro; 외딴별) | 3 | KOR: 29,665 |
| MCND Age | Released: January 8, 2021; Label: TOP Media; Formats: CD, digital download, streaming; Track listing: 1. "Intro: MCND Age"; 2. "Crush" (우당탕); 3. "Louder"; 4. "Ko, Ok!"; 5. "Player"; 6. "Outro"; ㅁㅊㄴㄷ; 7. "Not Over" (아직 끝난 거 아이다) | 4 | KOR: 25,560 |
| The Earth: Secret Mission | Chapter.1; Released: August 31, 2021; Label: TOP Media; Formats: CD, digital download, streaming; Track listing: 1. "Movin'" (너에게로); 2. "Cat Waltz" (고양이 춤); 3. "Bowwowwow"; 4. "H.B.C"; 5. "Play Pungak" (풍악을 울려); 6. "Reason" | 6 | KOR: 26,911 |
| The Earth: Secret Mission | Chapter.2; Released: July 7, 2022; Label: TOP Media; Formats: CD, digital download, streaming; Track listing: 1. "W.A.T.1"; 2. "#Mood"; 3. "Blow"; 4. "Red Sun"; 5. "Juice"; 6. "Back to You" | 17 | KOR: 17,666 |
| Odd-Venture | Released: November 22, 2023; Label: TOP Media; Formats: CD, digital download, streaming; Track listing: 1. "Run"; 2. "Odd-Venture"; 3. "Pop Star"; 4. "Treasure"; 5. "Loosen Up"; 6. "Cruise"; 7. "W.A.T.1" (English ver.) | 6 | KOR: 22,641 |
| X10 | Released: May 21, 2024; Label: TOP Media; Formats: CD, digital download, streaming; Track listing: 1. "X10"; 2. "Tuning" (절대음감); 3. "Out Louder" (고래); 4. "Treasure"; 5. "Girl Friend"; 6. "Top Gang Vol.2" | 14 | KOR: 36,554 |
| Devil Youth Club | Released: September 10, 2026; Label: TOP Media; Formats: CD, digital download, streaming; Track listing: 1. "Devil Youth Club"; 2. "Beat Don't Stop"; 3. "Hot Stuff"; 4. "She Got That"; 5. "Devil Youth Club" (instrumental) | 11 | KOR: 11,990 |

=== Singles ===
| Title | Year | Peak chart positions | Album |
| Title | Year | US World | Album |
|---|---|---|---|
| "Top Gang" | 2020 | — | Into the Ice Age |
| "Ice Age" | 2020 | — | Into the Ice Age |
| "Spring" (떠) | 2020 | — | Non-album single |
| "Nanana" | 2020 | — | Earth Age |
| "Crush" (우당탕) | 2021 | 25 | MCND Age |
| "Movin'" (너에게로) | 2021 | — | The Earth: Secret Mission Chapter.1 |
| "#Mood" | 2022 | — | The Earth: Secret Mission Chapter.2 |
| "Odd-Venture" | 2023 | — | Odd-Venture |
| "X10" | 2024 | — | X10 |
| "아뜨뜨뜨" | 2024 | — | Non-album singles |
| "Devil Youth Club" | 2026 | — | Devil Youth Club |
"—" denotes releases that did not chart or were not released in that region.

== Music videos ==
| Title | Year | Director |
|---|---|---|
| "Top Gang" | 2020 | —N/a |
| "Ice Age" | 2020 | Saccharin Film |
| "Spring" (떠) | 2020 | Saccharin Film |
| "Hey you" | 2020 | —N/a |
| "Nanana" | 2020 | Saccharin Film |
| "Crush" (우당탕) | 2021 | Saccharin Film |
| "Not Over" | 2021 | SUNNY LEE, LEENU (INVS) |
| "Movin" (너에게로) | 2021 | Saccharin Film |
| "#Mood" | 2022 | Bang Jae-yeob |
| "Odd-Venture" | 2023 | SunnyVisual |
| "Devil youth club" | 2026 | |

== Awards and nominations ==
The name of the award ceremony, year presented, the award category, nominee(s) of the award, and the result
| Award ceremony | Year | Category | Work(s)/nominee(s) | Result | Ref. |
|---|---|---|---|---|---|
| Asia Artist Awards | 2020 | Male Singer Popularity Award | MCND | Nominated | |
| Asia Artist Awards | 2021 | Male Idol Group Popularity Award | MCND | Nominated | |
| Asia Model Awards | 2021 | Rookie of the Year | MCND | Won | |
| Golden Disc Awards | 2021 | Rookie Artist of the Year | MCND | Nominated | |
| Korea First Brand Awards | 2021 | New Male Artist Award | MCND | Nominated | |
| Melon Music Awards | 2020 | New Artist of the Year - Male | MCND | Nominated | |
| Mnet Asian Music Awards | 2020 | Artist of the Year | MCND | Nominated | |
| Mnet Asian Music Awards | 2020 | Best New Male Artist | MCND | Nominated | |
| Mnet Asian Music Awards | 2020 | Worldwide Fans' Choice Top 10 | MCND | Nominated | |
| Soribada Best K-Music Awards | 2020 | New K-Wave New Artist Award | MCND | Won | |
