= Matthew Yen =

Taiwanese lyricist

Matthew Yen (born 1975) is a Taiwanese lyricist, writer, and A&R. He graduated from the Department of Land Economics, National Chengchi University. In 2008, he won the “Best Original Song” in the 45th Golden Horse Awards with the theme song for the movie "Cape No. 7 海角七號". In 2013, Jolin Tsai’s “The Great Artist 大藝術家", which he wrote the lyrics for, won the “Song of the Year” in the 24th Golden Melody Awards.

== Early life ==
Spending his early childhood in the countryside of Nantou, Yen grew up in Minsheng community in Taipei since his student years. He once dreamed of becoming a professional baseball player. In 1972, he heard Da Yu Lo's “Xian Xiang 72 Bian 現象72變" for the first time at his cousin's house, and was deeply amazed by the music. Since then, he grew into the habit of reading the lyrics pamphlet first when listening to a music album. Growing up, Yen was deeply influenced by Chinese pop music in the 1990s, and a large amount of his pocket money was used to buy cassettes and CDs. He is also a fan of anime; his favorite manga are "Saint Seiya" by Masami Kurumanda and "H2" by Mitsuru Adachi, and he loves all kinds of horror video games.

== Career ==
=== Early career ===
Yen started writing lyrics at the age of thirteen. During his studies at the National Chengchi University, he met Hsiao-Wen Ting through participating in the Golden String Award competition, and was further signed as a lyricist. In planning to fully devote himself to songwriting without any concerns about the future, he volunteered to serve an extra 6 months of military service as a navy receiver and went to the United States for training. During the period in the States, Yen released his first hit song, “Feng Yi Yang De Nan Zi 風一樣的男子” by Daniel Chan.

After serving the army, Yen joined Linfair Records and Fishes Music as A&R. The first album he participated in was Christine Fan's "Fan Fan's World 范范的世界".

=== Songwriter and producer ===
In December 2000, Yen wrote the lyrics for “My Desired Happiness 我要的幸福" by Stefanie Sun. This song was the main hit in her second album, which was the annual sales champion in Taiwan in 2001. This song is of great significance to Yen personally, for once he mentioned in an interview stating that "this song defined my attitude towards songwriting."

Having been in the industry for more than 20 years, Yen has released more than 500 lyrics to date, including Jolin Tsai’s "Agent J 特務J", "The Great Artist 大藝術家", "Lady in Red 紅衣女孩", Amei’s “Fever 發燒", Coco Lee's “Di Jiu Ye 第九夜", Stefanie Sun's "My Desired Happiness 我要的幸福", “Learn 學會", Vivian Hsu's "Hao Yen Lei Huai Yen Lei 好眼淚壞眼淚", Show Luo’s “Lian Ai Da Ren 戀愛達人", Cyndi Wang's “Jie Mao Wan Wan 睫毛彎彎", "Little Star 小星星", "Miss You 想你想你", and Alibaba Group's annual branding song "Ali Zoo 阿里動物園”, etc.

The albums he participated as an A&R include Christine Fan's "Fan Fan's World 范范的世界" and "The Sun 太陽", Jill Hsu's "First Love 愛之初", Where Chou's “Hui Er Jue Ban 蕙兒絕版", William Wing Hong So's "So Fresh", Abo & Brandy's "First Album 首張創作專輯" and Sweety's "Hi! Sweety”, etc. He has also served as the album lyrics supervisor for singers such as Ailing Tai, Wallace Chung, and F.I.R.

Yen won the “Song of the Year" in the 24th Golden Melody Award with Jolin Tsai's "The Great Artist 大藝術家" in 2012. In 2019, he wrote the lyrics for Shi Shi's "LET IT ROLL" and was nominated for the “Best Alternative Pop Single” at the 10th Golden Indie Music Awards.

=== TV and Theater ===
From 2003 to 2004, Yen completed three TV drama novels: ”Snow Angel 雪天使", “Love Bird 候鳥e人" and “Hi-Fly 升空高飛”. In 2004, he met director Te-Sheng Wei and learned about his idea of making “Seediq Bale 賽德克巴萊”, after then Yen wrote the movie's novel. However, due to funding reasons, director Wei first filmed another movie, "Cape No. 7 海角七號”, in 2008. Yen wrote the lyrics for the theme song along with other songs in the movie, including “Guo Jing Zhi Nan 國境之南", “Wu Le Bu Zuo 無樂不作", “Ai Ni Ai Dao Si 愛你愛到死". “Guo Jing Zhi Nan 國境之南" won the “Best Original Song” in the 45th Golden Horse Award, and Yen was also nominated for the “Best Lyricist” in the Golden Melody Awards.

Yen's film and stage songwriting works also include the theme song of “KANO", “Yong Zhe De Lang Man 勇者的浪漫", the production of the 2017 musical movie "52 Hertz, I Love You" and the lyrics of its 17 songs, and the theater production “Saving Soulmate Manor 救救歡喜鴛鴦樓” by Spring River Performing Arts Troupe, etc.

Since 2017, he and director Chun Hong Lee, a two-time Golden Bell Award winner, have become partners, and together created many long and short films, albums, music videos and commercials. Over the years, Yen has written music video scripts including Yvonne Cheng’s “I Remember 記得", Ailing Tai’s "One More Second 暫時愛著我" and “Out of Darkness Comes Light 暗了，亮了" (we can get married, Rainbow version), Spark’s “Fair Fakeass Tale 格林成人童話”, etc. He also wrote scripts for commercials and dramas, such as Zhuji Dumplings’ “Ji De, Yao Chi Bao 記得，要吃飽”, PTV's innovative short films “Jue Dui Ling Yu 絕對領域" and “Ren Qiu 人球", and the series “Mom, Don’t Do That! 媽，別鬧了！”, which is scheduled to be aired at the end of 2021.

=== Public affairs ===
- Guest speaker at schools of all levels, enterprises and organizations since 2009.
- Served as the first and final stage panel of the 27th Golden Melody Awards since 2016.
- Participated in the creation of game scripts since 2019. The first game he got involved in was “Qinoto" (name tentative), which is scheduled to be released in 2022
- Served as the first review panel of the 31st Golden Melody Awards in 2020

== Literature ==
- Collection of short stories “Xiang Ni De Li Ren Jie 想你的離人節”, published by Cosmax Publishing in 2008.
- Novel “Ai Wu Neng, Xing Fu Bu Neng 愛無能，幸福不能”, published by Cosmax Publishing in 2009
- Novel "Mei Zhi Tie 妹至帖”, published by Unitas Publishing in 2013.

== Artistry ==
Yen believes that one’s work represents oneself. Having a serious attitude towards life is to accumulate the energy that’ll serve as the foundation for songwriting; he once said, ”You must first survive before you can have fun." He is also very conscious of the influence he might have on others, so he always thinks carefully before answering any questions in every interview.

Being empathetic, good at listening, and sensitive to people’s stories are what helps with songwriting. Yen believes that every piece of lyrics represents a story, so he is always listening to and telling stories. For him, the role of a lyricist is to serve people. There are many aspects to consider, such as the producer’s ideas, the style of the artists, the trend of pop culture, etc. Communication is crucial to line out the roadmap of the song within the limited time constraints. As a literary worker, Yen believes he has chosen a job which he loves the most, and has been persistent and hardworking in the pursuit of his career.

== Works ==
Listing a few of his major works:

- Abo&Brandy《城堡》
- Stefanie Sun《我要的幸福》、《學會》、《夢遊》
- Elva Hsiao《艷遇》、《愛夠了》、《愛情的微光》
- Jolin Tsai《海洋之心》、《特務J》、《花蝴蝶》、《離人節》、《派大星》、《黑髮尤物》、《大藝術家》、《旅程》、《萬花瞳》、《美杜莎》、《紅衣女孩》
- Daniel Chan《風一樣的男子》
- Claire Kuo《我不想忘記你》
- Vivian Hsu《好眼淚壞眼淚》、《So So》
- Show Luo《戀愛達人》、《好朋友》、《幸福不滅》、《第二順位》、《愛不單行》、《今天妳最漂亮》、《舞極限》
- Amei《發燒》
- Harlem Yu《無盡透明的思念》
- Rainie Yang《乖不乖》、《左邊》、《芥末巧克力》、《狼來了》、《女孩們》
- Angela Chang《復活節》、《樣子》、《永晝》
- Cyndi Wang《睫毛彎彎》、《小星星》、《想你想你》、《陪我到以後》、《教海鷗飛行的貓》
- Coco Lee《第九夜》
- Shin《我恨你》《不能沒有你》
- Tiger Huang《寫乎啥米人》、《老月光》、《不吠》、《說到做到》、《那些我愛的人》
- Gigi Leung《初心》
- Van Fan《國境之南》、《無樂不作》、《最最愛》
- William So Wing Hong《一人獨得》、《無可奉告》
- A-Lin《All In》
- EXO 《Lotto》、《Boomerang（愛迴旋）》
- Shi Shi《分裂》、《原來你是這樣的人》、《Let It Roll》
- WayV《理所當然（Regular）》、《噩夢（Come Back）》、《無翼而飛（Take Off）》、《天選之城（Moonwalk）》《超時空 回（Turn Back Time）》
- Ailing Tai《燒》
- 52 Hz, I love you-電影音樂創作輯

== Awards ==
| Year | Song | Award | Status |
|---|---|---|---|
| 2008 | “Guo Jing Zhi Nan 國境之南” (Theme song for Cape No. 7) | "Best original song" in the 45th Golden Horse Awards | Won |
| 2009 | “Guo Jing Zhi Nan 國境之南” (Theme song for Cape No. 7) | "Best Lyricist” in the 20th Golden Melody Awards | Nominated |
| 2013 | "The Great Artist 大藝術家” by Jolin Tsai | “Song of the Year" in the 24th Golden Melody Awards | Won |
| 2019 | "LET IT ROLL” by Shi Shi | “Best Alternative Pop Single” in the 10th Golden Indie Music Awards | Nominated |
