= TOP Media =

South Korean company

- Native name: 티오피미디어
- Type: Private
- Industry: Entertainment
- Founded: Seoul, South Korea (2005)
- Founder: Andy Lee and Lee Jae-hong
- Headquarters: 34-11, Samseong-dong, Gangnam-gu, Seoul, South Korea
- Key people: Andy Lee (이선호; CEO); Lee Jae-hong (이재홍; CEO)
- Services: artist management contents planning contents producing global marketing new contents development
- Website: www.itopgroup.com

TOP Media (Korean: 티오피미디어; also known as T.O.P Media) is a South Korean company, founded by Shinhwa's Andy, handling the management of several artists. TOP Media usually works with Sony Music Entertainment Korea for distribution of its musical releases.

== History ==
TOP Media was founded as ND Entertainment (New Dream Entertainment) by Andy and his former long-time manager at SM Entertainment, Lee Jae-hong, in 2005. In 2009, the company debuted Jumper, a male pop duo, who released two singles, "Yes!" and "Dazzling" (Korean: 눈이부셔). Jumper, however, disbanded soon after the release of their second single. A year later, Teen Top debuted, followed by 100% in 2012, and Up10tion in 2015.

The company's newest boy group, MCND, debuted on February 27, 2020 with the EP Into the Ice Age. On October 9, 2021, 100% disbanded after the remaining members' contracts expired and they left the company. In January 2022, Teen Top members Niel and Changjo's contracts expired. In March 2023, the contracts of several members of Up10tion expired. On May 11, C.A.P. left Teen Top and terminated his contract with TOP Media. On March 5, 2024, Kim Woo-seok's contract expired. On November 1, the company debuted their first girl group Odd Youth.

== Artists ==
=== Current artists ===
==== Soloists ====
- Andy

==== Groups ====
- Teen Top
- MCND
- Odd Youth

== Former artists ==
- Jang Hyunwoo
- Jumper (2009)
- Teen Top (2010–2023)
  - L.Joe (2010–2017)
  - Niel (2010–2022)
  - Changjo (2010–2022)
  - C.A.P. (2010–2023)
  - Chunji (2010–2023)
  - Ricky (2010–2023)
- 100% (2012–2021)
  - Sanghoon (2012–2014)
  - Changbum (2012–2016)
  - Minwoo (2012–2018)
  - Rockhyun (2012–2021)
  - Jonghwan (2012–2021)
  - Chanyong (2012–2021)
  - Hyukjin (2012–2021)
- Eric (2019–2022)
- Han Gyu-jin
- Up10tion (2015–2023)
  - Jinhoo (2015–2023)
  - Kuhn (2015–2023)
  - Kogyeol (2015–2023)
  - Bitto (2015–2023)
  - Sunyoul (2015–2023)
  - Gyujin (2015–2023)
  - Lee Jin-hyuk (2015–2023)
  - Hwanhee (2015–2023)
  - Xiao (2015–2023)
  - Kim Woo-seok (2015–2024)
