= Jungwoo =

South Korean singer and entertainer(born 1998)

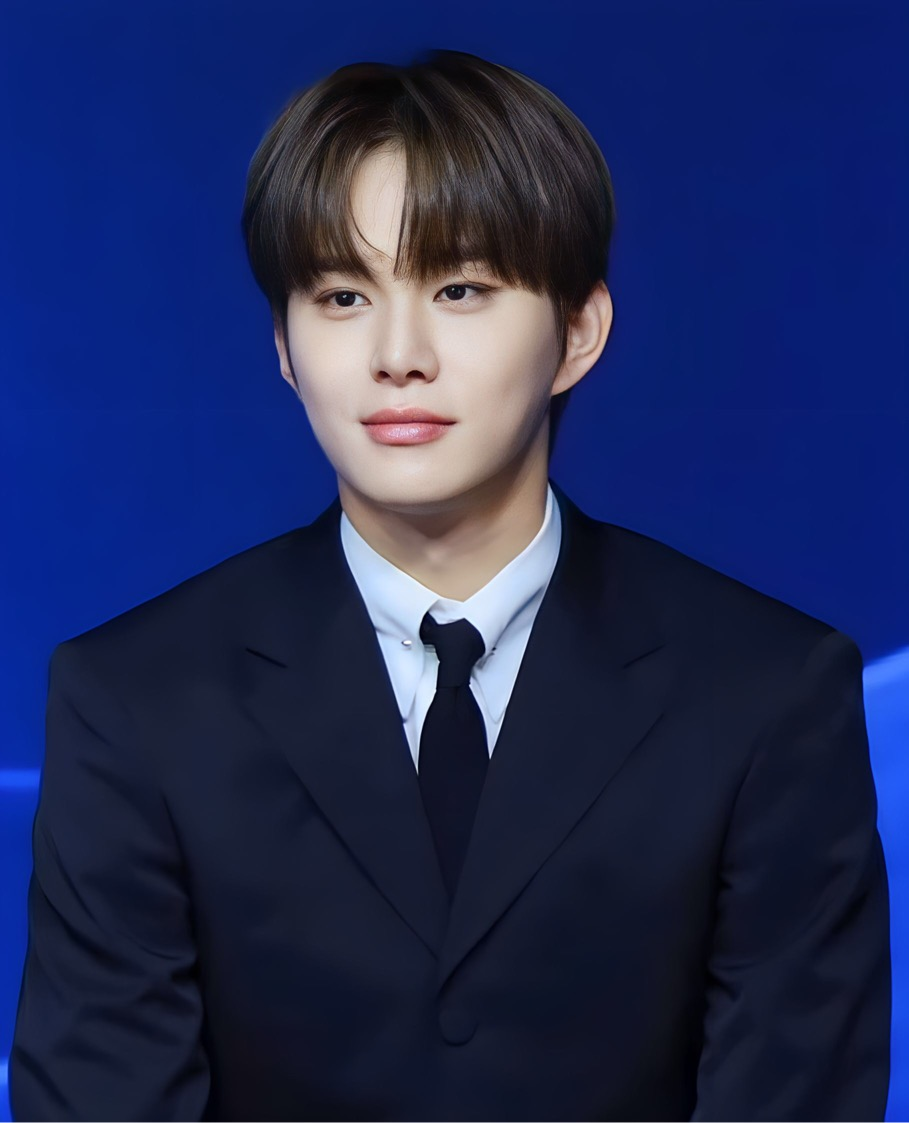
- Jungwoo in 2023
- Born: Kim Jung-woo; February 19, 1998 (age 28); Gunpo, South Korea
- Occupation: Singer
- Musical career
- Genre: K-pop
- Instrument: Vocals
- Years active: 2017–present
- Label: SM
- Member of: NCT; NCT 127; NCT DoJaeJung
- Formerly of: SM Rookies

Korean name
- Hangul: 김정우
- RR: Gim Jeongu
- MR: Kim Chŏngu

Kim Jung-woo (Korean: 김정우; born February 19, 1998), known mononymously as Jungwoo, is a South Korean singer and entertainer. He is a member of the SM Entertainment South Korean boy group NCT and its sub-units NCT 127 and NCT DoJaeJung.

== Life and career ==
=== 1998–2013: Early life ===
Kim Jungwoo was born on February 19, 1998, in Sanbon-dong, Gunpo, South Korea, and right after he was born, they moved to Gimpo, where he was raised.

He attended Gimpo Gochang Middle School and Gimpo Jeil Technical High School Computer's Department of Computer Applied Machinery.

=== 2014–2019: SM Rookies and NCT ===
Jungwoo started training in 2014, after passing the SM's Saturday Open Auditions. He trained alongside SM Rookies and NCT members. Fans have been familiar with Jungwoo as an SM trainee as he was often seen together with SM Rookies and noticed him performing during the SM Rookies Show.

On April 18, 2017, Jungwoo was introduced in the new batch of SM Rookies, SR17B. On the same day, he appeared in label-mate Super Junior member Yesung's music video, "Paper Umbrella" as his first public appearance.

In January 2018, it was announced that Jungwoo, alongside SM Rookies "3 Lucky People", Kun and Lucas, will be debuting with NCT. Jungwoo debuted on February 18, 2018, as part of NCT U for the lead single of NCT's debut studio album NCT 2018 Empathy, "Boss". In October of the same year, he joined the Seoul-based unit NCT 127 with the title "Regular" for their first studio album Regular-Irregular, with the positions of dancer and vocalist.

In August 2019, in the middle of NCT 127's first world tour, Neo City – The Origin, it was announced that Jungwoo will be taking a temporary break due to health concerns after his noticeable absences from the group's activities.

=== 2020–present: Comeback, solo activities ===
In January 2020, SM Entertainment confirmed that Jungwoo will be returning with NCT 127 for their 2nd studio album Neo Zone and title "Kick It (영웅)".

In July 2021, Jungwoo was announced as one of new hosts for Show! Music Core with Stray Kids' Lee Know, joining former Iz*One member Minju. He debuted as an MC on August 14, where he performed Sung Si-kyung's "Smiling Angel" (미소천사). Later that year, he was nominated alongside his co-hosts for the 2021 MBC Entertainment Awards' Rookie Award.

Alongside his fellow NCT 127 members, Doyoung and Jaehyun, Jungwoo debuted in a new NCT fixed sub-unit NCT DoJaeJung on April 17, 2023, with their debut EP Perfume. August of the same year, Channel TEO launched "Welcome Ghost Club" featuring Jungwoo as part of their pilot project, Fantastic Lab. Welcome Ghost Club is a mystery adventure YouTube series where club president, Jungwoo, hunts for ghosts to debunk the broadcasting industry myth, "Seeing ghosts bring prosperity".

On March 23, 2024, Jungwoo's official soundtrack "Smile Good Bye" for Fubao and Grandfather Season 2 was released. The soundtrack contains the message of remembering and supporting Fubao, a popular giant panda born in South Korea returning to China. In June 2024, KBS KPop Youtube channel announced a new web variety program, Nopogy, featuring Jungwoo and Monsta X Shownu. The program focuses on visiting old traditional Korean restaurants where the two hosts gets to taste the restaurants' signature meals or specialties, while having conversation with their exclusive guests. In December 2024, he released his first drama official soundtrack "First Step" for Channel A historical romance drama, Check-in Hanyang. It is a ballad characterized by a soft, repetitive piano melody, and a soothing guitar accompaniment.

In October 2025, it was announced that Jungwoo will enlist for his mandatory military service on December 8 and will be part of the army band. In November 2025, Jungwoo made his official solo debut with the digital single "Sugar" and its accompanying music video. The song is described as a vocal pop track with elements of groove and swing drums. Following this debut, his first solo fan meeting titled "Golden Sugar Time" was held twice on November 28, 2025 at the Seoul Olympic Handball Gymnasium.

== Other ventures ==
=== Endorsements ===
In September 2023, the Italian luxury fashion company Tod's appointed Jungwoo as its first male brand ambassador in South Korea. Through his partnership with the company, Jungwoo attended fashion shows at the Milan Fashion Week, participated in brand pop-up events, and featured in fashion magazines. He collaborated with its creative director on his styling for "Sugar". In December 2023, Jungwoo and Doyoung became brand models for the South Korean cosmetics company Peripera. Jungwoo has also appeared on the cover of fashion magazines wearing Cartier.

=== Philanthropy ===
In March 2025, Jungwoo donated ₩50 million to the Hope Bridge Korea Disaster Relief Association to aid recovery efforts for the wildfires that broke out that month.

== Discography ==
=== Singles ===
List of singles as lead artist, with year of release, selected chart positions, and associated album
Title	Year	Peak chart positions	Album
Title	Year	KOR	Album
"Sugar"	2025	27	Non-album single

=== Promotional singles ===
List of promotional singles, with year of release, selected chart positions, and associated album
Title	Year	Peak chart positions	Album
Title	Year	KOR DL	Album
"Smile Good Bye" (이젠 웃으며, 안녕)	2024	63	Non-album single
"First Step" (같이 걸을래)	2024	65	Check-in Hanyang

=== Other charted songs ===
List of other charted songs, with year of release, selected chart positions, and associated album
Title	Year	Peak chart positions	Album
Title	Year	KOR DL	Album
"Goodbye" (12월의 인사) (with Sunny and Renjun)	2021	85	2021 Winter SM Town: SMCU Express

== Filmography ==
=== Television ===
Year	Title	Role	Ref.
2021–2023	Show! Music Core	Host	

=== Web ===
Year	Title	Role	Ref.
2021–2023	Kim Jungwoo's Finding this Person	Host	
2023	Welcome Ghost Club	Host	
2024–2025	Nopogy (노포기)	Host	

=== Music video ===
Year	Title	Artist	Ref.
2017	"Paper Umbrella"	Yesung	

== Accolades ==
=== Awards and nominations ===
List of awards and nominations, with name of the award, year of ceremony, recipient, category, and result of the nomination
Award	Year	Recipient	Category	Result	Ref.
KBS Entertainment Awards	2024	Nopogy (with Shownu)	Digital Content Award	Won	
MBC Entertainment Awards	2021	Show! Music Core	Rookie Award	Nominated	

=== Listicles ===
List of listicle placements, with name of the publisher, year of listing, name of the listicle, and placement
Publisher	Year	Listicle	Placement	Ref.
Billboard	2024	K-Pop Artist 100	83rd	
