= Soar (Doyoung album) =

2025 studio album by Doyoung

- Digital cover

Studio album by Doyoung
- Released: June 9, 2025
- Studio: SM Studios (Seoul)
- Genres: K-pop; R&B; pop rock; ballad
- Length: 36:57
- Language: Korean
- Labels: SM; Kakao

Doyoung chronology
Youth (2024)	Soar (2025)	Promise (2025)

Singles from Soar
- 1. "Memory" Released: June 9, 2025

Soar is the second studio album by South Korean singer Doyoung. It was released on June 9, 2025 by SM Entertainment through Kakao Entertainment, and featured ten tracks, included the lead single "Memory".

== Background and release ==
Doyoung debuted as a member of NCT since 2016, where he participated three of its sub-unit; NCT U, NCT 127, and NCT DoJaeJung. On May 19, 2025, news report that Doyoung will return as a solo artist in April. Later, on June 9, SM announced that Doyoung will make his official return as a solo artist with his second studio album, Soar, which will contain 10 tracks.

== Conception ==
According to the album announcement, SM revealed that Soar is an album that contains various emotions (foam) that arise in the "waves of youth", with the story of the precious moments that allowed one to sing most honestly as a youth was told without any embellishment through Doyoung's voice.

== Track listing ==
Soar track listing
No.	Title	Lyrics	Music	Arrangement	Length
1.	"Wake From the Dark" (깊은 잠)	Eldon; MooF (MonoTree); Jae Do-gi	Eldon; MooF (MonoTree); Jae Do-gi	Eldon; MooF (MonoTree); Jae Do-gi	2:53
2.	"Memory" (안녕, 우주)	Kim Eana	Seo Dong-hwan	Seo Dong-hwan	3:03
3.	"Be My Light" (쏟아져오는 바람처럼 눈부시게 너란 빛이 비추더라)	Jo Won-sang	INFX	INFX	3:26
4.	"First Step" (자전거)	Lee Soo-bin (153/Joombas)	Lee Joo-hyoung (MonoTree); Etham Basden; Hautboi Rich	Lee Joo-hyoung (MonoTree)	3:18
5.	"Just Friends" (편한 사람)	Bae Hae (Lalala Studio); Lee Aeng-du (153/Joombas)	Matthew Tishler; Felicia Barton; Aaron Benward	Tishler	3:48
6.	"Luminous" (동경)	Kim Yuna	Kim Yuna	Kim Yuna	4:38
7.	"Still" (고요)	Yoon Do-hyun	Yoon Do-hyun; Kim Jung-il	Yoo Tae-young	4:10
8.	"Sonnet" (소네트)	Kim Jun-seo	Kim Jun-seo	Kim Jun-seo	3:53
9.	"Sand Box"	Kim Jong-wan	Kim Jong-wan; Ko Tae-young	Kim Jong-wan	4:09
10.	"Eternity" (미래에서 기다릴게)	Eldon; MooF (MonoTree); Jae Do-gi	Eldon; MooF (MonoTree); Jae Do-gi	Eldon; MooF (MonoTree); Jae Do-gi	3:39
Total length:					36:57

== Credits and personnel ==
Credits adapted from the album's liner notes.

Studio

- SM Starlight Studio – recording (track 1–2, 4), digital editing, engineered for mix (track 1–2), mixing (track 4)
- Prelude Studio – drums recording (track 2–3, 8), bass recording (track 8), strings recording (track 3, 6–8)
- SmileDong Studio – guitar recording (track 2)
- SM Droplet Studio – recording (track 3)
- SM Big Shot Studio – bass recording (track 3), mixing (track 10)
- SM Yellow Tail Studio – recording, engineered for mix (track 4, 10), digital editing (track 10)
- SM Aube Studio – recording (track 5, 8–9), engineered for mix (track 3, 5)
- Dream Factory Studio – recording, piano recording, digital editing (track 6)
- SM Wavelet Studio – recording, digital editing (track 7), engineered for mix (track 7–8)
- Seoul Studio – drums recording, bass recording, guitar recording (track 7)
- SM LVYIN Studio – recording (track 8)
- MonoTree Studio – Pro Tools operating (track 4–5), digital editing (track 4)
- Doobdoob Studio – digital editing (track 5)
- SM Azure Studio – digital editing (track 8)
- GCA Studio – engineered for mix (track 9)
- SM Blue Ocean Studio – mixing (track 1, 3, 5)
- SM Concert Hall Studio – mixing (track 2, 8)
- Koko Sound – mixing (track 6)
- SM Blue Cup Studio – mixing (track 7)
- KLANG Studio – mixing (track 9)
- 821 Sound – mastering (all tracks)

Personnel

- Doyoung – vocals (all tracks), background vocals (track 1–5, 8–10)
- Eldon – vocal directing (track 1, 10), background vocals (track 10)
- Jae Do-gi – vocal directing, background vocals (track 1, 10)
- MooF (MonoTree) – drums, piano, synthesizer (track 1, 10), bass (track 10)
- Seo Dong-hwan – vocal directing, piano, synthesizer, MIDI programming, guitar recording (track 2)
- INFX – vocal directing, piano, strings arrangement (track 3)
- Lee Joo-hyung (MonoTree) – background vocals, piano, MIDI programming, digital editing (track 4), vocal directing, Pro Tools operating (track 4–5)
- Kim Yuna – vocal directing (track 6)
- Yoon Do-hyun – vocal directing (track 7)
- Yoo Tae-young – piano, strings conducting, strings arrangement (track 7)
- Kim Jun-seo – background vocals, piano, synthesizer, MIDI programming (track 8)
- Kim Jong-wan – vocal directing, electric guitar, piano, synthesizer, MIDI programming, digital editing (track 9)
- Ko Tae-young – acoustic guitar, electric guitar (track 9)
- Hyun – vocal directing (track 8)
- Kang Tae-woo a.k.a. Soulman – background vocals (track 9)
- Lee Jin-won – guitar (track 1, 10)
- Kim Kyung-seop – bass (track 1)
- Kang Butter (Studio Button) – background vocals (track 2–3), electric guitar, synthesizer, MIDI programming (track 2)
- Shin Seung-kyu – drums (track 2–3, 8)
- Cha I-hwan – bass (track 2–3, 8)
- Song Hyun-jong – acoustic guitar, electric guitar (track 2)
- Naive – synthesizer (track 2)
- Shin Jae-won – guitar (track 3)
- Yang Ja-in – strings conducting, strings arrangement (track 3, 8)
- On The String – strings (track 3, 6–8)
- Choi Ji-hoon – piano (track 6)
- Park In-young – strings conducting, strings arrangement (track 6)
- Im Sung-hwan – drums (track 7)
- Choi In-sung – bass (track 7)
- Kim Dong-min – guitar (track 7)
- Jung Seok-hoon – acoustic guitar, electric guitar, MIDI programming (track 8)
- Lee Tae-young – electric guitar (track 8)
- Jeong Yoo-ra – recording (track 1–2, 4), digital editing, engineered for mix (track 1–2), mixing (track 4)
- Lee Chang-sun – drums recording (track 2–3, 8), bass recording (track 8), strings recording (track 3, 6–8)
- Choi Eun-mi – recording assistant (track 2–3, 6–8)
- Kim Joo-hyun – recording (track 3)
- Lee Min-kyu – bass recording (track 3), mixing (track 10)
- Noh Min-ji – recording, engineered for mix (track 4, 10), digital editing (track 10)
- Kim Hyo-joon – recording (track 5, 8–9), engineered for mix (track 3, 5)
- Kim Jun-sang – recording, piano recording, digital editing (track 6)
- Kang Eun-ji – recording, digital editing (track 7), engineered for mix (track 7–8)
- Jeong Ki-hong – drums recording, bass recording, guitar recording (track 7)
- Choi Da-in – drums recording, bass recording, guitar recording (track 7)
- Lee Ji-hong – recording (track 8)
- Kim Sun-ah – digital editing (track 3)
- Eugene Kwon – digital editing (track 5)
- Kim Jae-yeon – digital editing (track 8)
- Oh Dan-young – digital editing (track 8)
- Eom Se-hyun – engineered for mix (track 9)
- Kim Cheol-sun – mixing (track 1, 3, 5)
- Nam Koong-jin – mixing (track 2, 8)
- Ko Hyun-jung – mixing (track 6)
- Jung Eui-seok – mixing (track 7)
- Koo Jong-pil – mixing (track 9)
- Kwon Nam-woo – mastering (all tracks)

== Release history ==
Release history and formats for Soar
Region	Date	Format	Label
Various	June 9, 2025	Digital download; streaming; CD	SM; Kakao Entertainment
