= Youth (Doyoung album) =

2024 studio album by Doyoung

- Digital cover

Studio album by Doyoung
- Released: April 22, 2024
- Studio: 520Hz (Seoul); SM Aube (Seoul); SM Big Shot (Seoul); SM Droplet (Seoul); SM LVYIN (Seoul); SM Wavelet (Seoul); SM Yellow Tail (Seoul)
- Genre: K-pop; pop rock; R&B
- Length: 35:33
- Language: Korean
- Label: SM; Kakao

Doyoung chronology
Youth (2024)	Soar (2025)

Singles from Youth
- 1. "Little Light" Released: April 22, 2024

Youth (Korean: 청춘의 포말; RR: Cheongchun-ui Pomal; lit. 'Foam of Youth') is the debut studio album by South Korean singer Doyoung. It was released on April 22, 2024 by SM Entertainment through Kakao Entertainment, and contained ten tracks. The album marked Doyoung as the third NCT member to make an official solo debut.

== Background and release ==
Doyoung debuted as a member of NCT since 2016, where he participated three of its sub-unit; NCT U, NCT 127, and NCT DoJaeJung. On March 11, 2024, news report that Doyoung will make his debut as a solo artist in April. Later, on April 4, SM announced that Doyoung will make his official debut as a solo artist with his first studio album, Youth, which will contain 10 tracks, on April 22, 2024. On April 5, an intro film, featured the album opener and Doyoung's self-composed track "Beginning", was released. Later on the same day, it was reported that Doyoung's labelmate Taeyeon will be featured on the album.

On April 8, 2024, the tracklist of the album was released, which saw several collaborators such as Doyoung's bandmate Mark, labelmate Kangta, and Kenzie, and also reveal the lead single off the album "Little Light".

== Conception ==
According to the album announcement, SM revealed that Youth is an album that contains various emotions (foam) that arise in the "waves of youth", with the story of the precious moments that allowed one to sing most honestly as a youth was told without any embellishment through Doyoung's voice.

== Track listing ==
Youth track listing
No.	Title	Lyrics	Music	Arrangement	Length
1.	"Beginning" (새봄의 노래)	Doyoung	Doyoung; Seo Dong-hwan	Seo Dong-hwan; Kang Butter	3:28
2.	"Little Light" (반딧불)	Jo Won-sang	Jo Won-sang; O.YEON; Choi Young-hoon; Eugene (Highbrid)	Jo Won-sang; O.YEON; Choi Young-hoon; Eugene (Highbrid)	3:44
3.	"From Little Wave" (나의 바다에게)	Doyoung; Jupiter	Goo-reum	Goo-reum	3:55
4.	"Time Machine" (featuring Taeyeon and Mark)	Mark	Chiara Hunter; Benjamin Ingrosso; Kasper Holm Larsen; Nanna Bottos	Chiara Hunter; Benjamin Ingrosso; Kasper Holm Larsen; Nanna Bottos	3:27
5.	"Serenade" (내가 됐으면 해)	Summer Kim	Ben Addict; Choi Min-jun; Lee Jung-woo	Ben Addict; Choi Min-jun; Lee Jung-woo	3:06
6.	"Rewind" (끝에서 다시)	Kkul Dal-ji (JYP Publishing)	Lee Joo-hyung (MonoTree); 333Jack	Lee Joo-hyung (MonoTree)	3:49
7.	"Warmth" (온기)	Sondia	Kangta; Dawnon; Kim Wook; Jae Do-gi; Hyun; None; Sondia	Kangta; Dawnon; Kim Wook; Jae Do-gi	3:35
8.	"Lost in California"	Ondine	Ondine; Jinsoul; Xxio	Ondine; Jinsoul; Xxio	3:28
9.	"Rest" (쉼표)	Jae Do-gi; eldon; MooF (MonoTree)	Jae Do-gi; eldon; MooF (MonoTree); Collie	Jae Do-gi; eldon; MooF (MonoTree)	3:40
10.	"Dallas Love Field"	Kenzie	Kenzie	Kenzie	3:14
Total length:					35:33

== Credits and personnel ==
Credits adapted from the album's liner notes.

Studio

- SM Yellow Tail Studio – recording (track 1–2, 4–5, 7, 10), digital editing (track 4), engineered for mix (track 2)
- SM Droplet Studio – recording (track 1, 4, 7, 9), engineered for mix (track 6–7, 10)
- 5.20Hz Studio – recording (track 2)
- SM Aube Studio – recording (track 3, 6), engineered for mix (track 3)
- SM Big Shot Studio – recording, engineered for mix, mixing (track 8)
- SM Wavelet Studio – recording (track 9), engineered for mix (track 1, 9)
- SM LVYIN Studio – recording (track 10), engineered for mix (track 5), mixing (track 5)
- Seoul Studio – strings recording (track 1, 7)
- SM Starlight Studio – digital editing (track 1), mixing (track 9)
- 77F Studio – digital editing (track 1)
- Doobdoob Studio – digital editing (track 2, 5, 7–10)
- MonoTree Studio – Pro Tools operating (track 4, 6), digital editing (track 6)
- SM Concert Hall Studio – mixing (track 1, 7)
- SM Blue Ocean Studio – mixing (track 2, 6, 10)
- SM Blue Cup Studio – mixing (track 3–4)
- 821 Sound – mastering (all tracks)

Personnel

- SM Entertainment – executive producer
- Jang Cheol-hyuk – executive supervisor
- Tak Young-jun – executive supervisor
- Doyoung – vocals (all tracks), lyrics (track 1, 3), composition (track 1), background vocals (Note: In track 8, Doyoung, Jonghan and Ondine are credited for providing the chorus and choir vocals, which similarly referred to background vocals.) (track 1, 3–10)
- Taeyeon – vocals, background vocals (track 4)
- Mark – vocals, lyrics, background vocals (track 4)
- Seo Dong-hwan – composition, arrangement, vocal directing, background vocals, piano, synthesizer, MIDI programming, strings conducting, strings arrangement (track 1)
- Kang Butter – arrangement (track 1), background vocals (track 1–2), synthesizer (track 1)
- Jo Won-sang – lyrics, composition, arrangement, vocal directing, bass, drums, percussion, MIDI programming (track 2)
- O.YEON – composition, arrangement, piano, strings arrangement (track 2)
- Choi Young-hoon – composition (track 2), arrangement (track 2), guitar (track 2, 8)
- Eugene (Highbrid) – composition, arrangement (track 2)
- Jupiter – lyrics (track 3)
- Goo-reum – composition, arrangement, piano, bass, MIDI programming, digital editing (track 3)
- Chiara Hunter – composition, arrangement (track 4)
- Benjamin Ingrosso – composition, arrangement (track 4)
- Kasper Holm Larsen – composition, arrangement (track 4)
- Nanna Bottos – composition, arrangement (track 4)
- Summer Kim – lyrics (track 5)
- Ben Addict – composition, arrangement, vocal directing, background vocals (track 5)
- Choi Min-jun – composition, arrangement, piano, organ, synthesizer, drums (track 5)
- Lee Jung-woo – composition, arrangement, guitar, bass (track 5)
- Kkul Dal-ji (JYP Publishing) – lyrics (track 6)
- Lee Joo-hyung (MonoTree) – composition (track 6), arrangement (track 6), vocal directing (track 4, 6), Pro Tools operating (track 4, 6), digital editing (track 6)
- 333Jack – composition (track 6)
- Sondia – lyrics, composition (track 7)
- Kangta – composition, arrangement, vocal directing (track 7)
- Dawnon – composition, arrangement (track 7)
- Kim Wook – composition, arrangement, piano, strings conducting, strings arrangement (track 7)
- Jae Do-gi – lyrics (track 9), composition (track 7, 9), arrangement (track 7, 9), vocal directing (track 7, 9), strings conducting (track 7)
- Hyun – composition (track 7)
- None – composition (track 7)
- Ondine – lyrics, composition, arrangement, vocal directing, background vocals, strings (track 8)
- Kim Jin-sol a.k.a. Jinsoul – composition, arrangement, vocal directing, drums, piano, harpsichord, synthesizer, keys, strings (track 8)
- Xxio – composition, arrangement, vocal directing, drums, synthesizer, keys, strings (track 8)
- eldon – lyrics, composition, arrangement, vocal directing, background vocals (track 9)
- MooF (MonoTree) – lyrics, composition, arrangement, piano, drums (track 9)
- Collie – composition (track 9)
- Kenzie – lyrics, composition, arrangement, vocal directing, instrumentation (track 10)
- Kim Min-seok – vocal directing (track 3)
- Yeon-su – background vocals (track 3)
- Jonghan – background vocals (track 8)
- 1Take (NEWTYPE) – vocal directing (track 9)
- Song Hyun-jong – guitar (track 1)
- Shin Seung-kyu – drums (track 1)
- Yang Kyung-ah – bass (track 1)
- Yung – strings (track 1, 7)
- Park In-sun – drums (track 2)
- Heo Se-gwa – guitar (track 3)
- Lee Ji-won – drums (track 3)
- Kwon Ji-yoon – piano (track 6)
- kyto6 – bass (track 8)
- Lee Jin-won – guitar (track 9)
- Kim Kyung-seop – bass (track 9)
- Kim Yoo-hyun – guitar (track 10)
- Noh Min-ji – recording (track 1–2, 4–5, 7, 10), digital editing (track 4), engineered for mix (track 2)
- Kim Joo-hyun – recording (track 1, 4, 7, 9), engineered for mix (track 6–7, 10)
- Park Ji-hwan – recording (track 2)
- Kim Hyo-joon – recording (track 3, 6), engineered for mix (track 3)
- Lee Min-kyu – recording, engineered for mix, mixing (track 8)
- Kang Eun-ji – recording (track 9), engineered for mix (track 1, 9)
- Lee Ji-hong – recording (track 10), engineered for mix (track 5), mixing (track 5)
- Jeong Ki-hong – strings recording (track 1, 7)
- Lee Chan-mi – strings recording (track 1, 7)
- Jeong Yoo-ra – digital editing (track 1), mixing (track 9)
- Woo Min-jeong – digital editing (track 1)
- Jang Woo-young – digital editing (track 2, 5, 9)
- Eugene Kwon – digital editing (track 7–8, 10)
- Nam Koong-jin – mixing (track 1, 7)
- Kim Cheol-sun – mixing (track 2, 6, 10)
- Jung Eui-seok – mixing (track 3–4)
- Kwon Nam-woo – mastering (all tracks)

== Charts ==
=== Weekly charts ===
Weekly chart performance for Youth
Chart (2024)	Peak position
Japanese Albums (Oricon)	8
Japanese Combined Albums (Oricon)	9
Japanese Hot Albums (Billboard Japan)	5
South Korean Albums (Circle)	3

=== Monthly charts ===
Monthly chart performance for Youth
Chart (2024)	Position
Japanese Albums (Oricon)	20
South Korean Albums (Circle)	10

=== Year-end charts ===
Year-end chart performance for Youth
Chart (2024)	Position
South Korean Albums (Circle)	62

== Certifications ==
Certifications for Youth
Region	Certification	Certified units/sales
South Korea (KMCA)	Platinum	250,000^{^}
^{^} Shipments figures based on certification alone.

== Release history ==
Release history and formats for Youth
Region	Date	Format	Label
South Korea	April 22, 2024	CD	SM; Kakao
Various	April 22, 2024	Digital download; streaming	SM
