= NCT (group) =

South Korean boy band

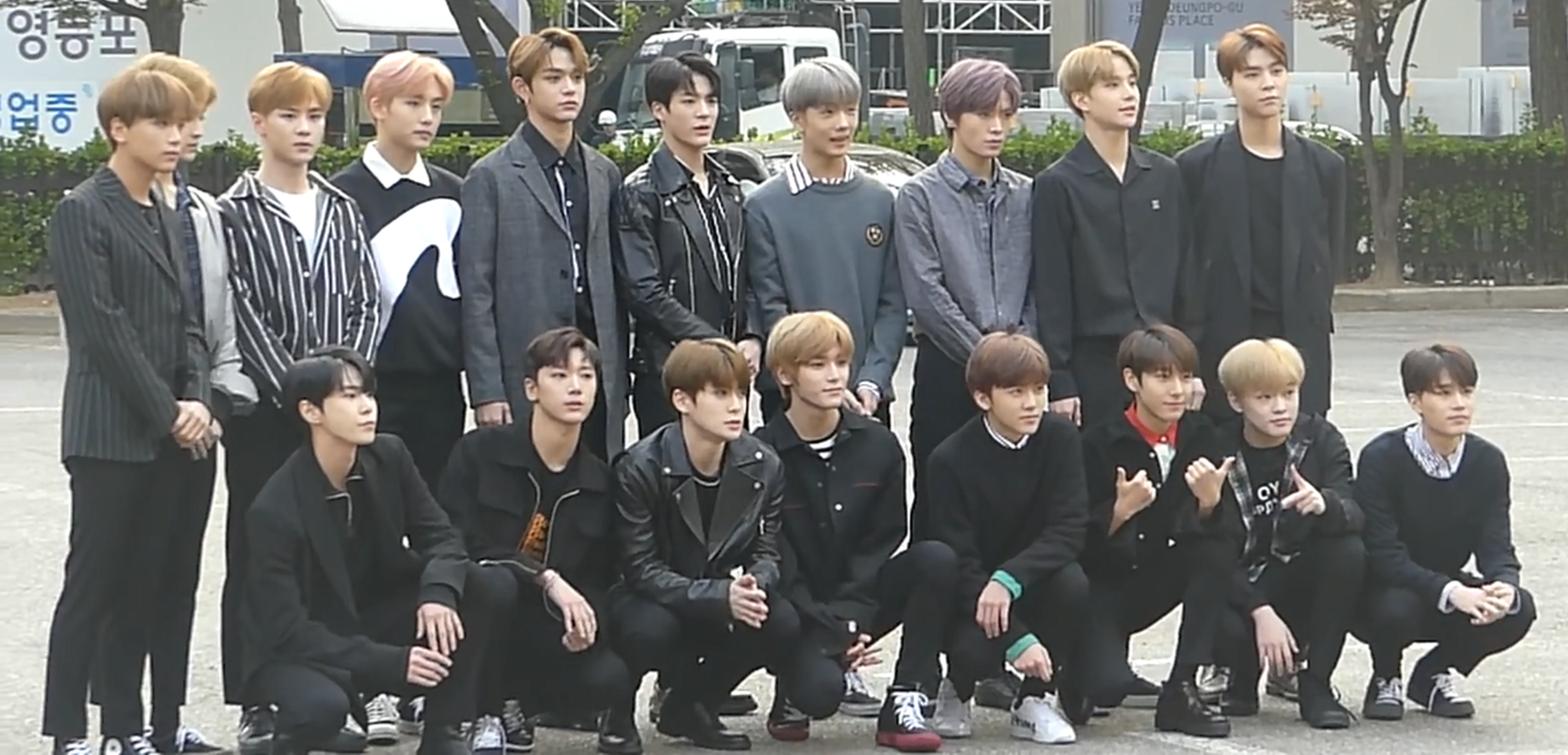
- NCT in April 2018

Background information
- Origin: Seoul, South Korea
- Genres: K-pop; C-pop; J-pop; Hip hop; R&B; EDM
- Years active: 2016–present
- Labels: SM; Avex Trax
- Spinoffs: NCT U; NCT 127; NCT Dream; WayV; NCT DoJaeJung; NCT Wish; NCT JNJM
- Members: see Members
- Website: Official website

NCT (Korean: 엔시티; RR: Ensiti; an initialism for Neo Culture Technology) is a South Korean boy band formed and managed by SM Entertainment. Introduced in January 2016, the group consists of 23 members divided into seven different sub-units: NCT U, NCT 127, NCT Dream, WayV, NCT DoJaeJung, NCT Wish, and NCT JNJM. They are known for their versatility in music, vocal and rap abilities, and powerful performances, and have been cited as K-pop's "most experimental boy band" due to their concept of having limitless members. As of June 2024, NCT has recorded more than 45 million album sales in Korea across all sub-units, making them the best-selling K-pop artist of all time.

The group debuted their first sub-unit, the rotational NCT U, on April 9, 2016, with the double digital single "The 7th Sense" and "Without You". It was followed by the Seoul-based sub-unit NCT 127 on July 7, 2016, with their eponymous extended play and the then-teenaged sub-unit NCT Dream on August 24, 2016, with the digital single "Chewing Gum". WayV, a seven-member sub-unit based in China and NCT's first overseas sub-unit, debuted on January 17, 2019, with the single album The Vision. On April 17, 2023, a fixed sub-unit featuring members Doyoung, Jaehyun, and Jungwoo debuted as NCT DoJaeJung with the EP Perfume. NCT's last overseas unit based in Japan, NCT Wish, debuted with the single "Wish" on February 28, 2024. Jeno and Jaemin formed NCT JNJM and will debut on February 23, 2026, with the EP Both Sides.

Although each sub-unit promotes separately, NCT has united four times as a group to record four full-length albums: Empathy (2018), Resonance (2020), Universe (2021), and Golden Age (2023). Within two months of release, Resonance sold over 2.6 million copies across its two parts, becoming the highest-selling physical album released by an act from SM Entertainment at the time and earning the group their first Daesang (Grand Prize) Award at the 2020 Asia Artist Awards. Universe, which was released in December 2021, became their most pre-ordered album at 1.7 million copies, and later surpassed 1.8 million sales after its release.

== Background and name ==
In January 2016, SM Entertainment founder Lee Soo-man delivered a presentation at the SM Coex Artium titled "SMTOWN: New Culture Technology 2016". The label planned to debut a new boy group that would "fall in line" with their culture contents strategy, one that would contain an "unlimited" number of members that would debut in separate sub-units within the group. Furthermore, the members would form "sub-unit teams" and have "collaborations" with each other. The name of the group was later revealed to be NCT, an acronym for the presentation title. NCT as a whole was SM Entertainment's first idol group to debut in nearly two years since Red Velvet in 2014 and SM Entertainment's first boy group to debut since Exo in 2012.

== History ==
=== 2013–2016: Formation and pre-debut activities ===
Prior to joining SM Entertainment, some of the members were already involved in the entertainment industry. Jeno appeared in various commercials as a child. Jisung was a child actor and filmed movies such as Boys, Be Curious (2012) and Go, Stop, Murder (2013). Chenle was active on the Chinese music scene as a singer from 2009 to 2015; he released three albums and headlined a concert in China. In 2011, Yuta participated in the singing competition "Juice Winter Collection" in Japan, while Ten competed on the Thai TV show Teen Superstar under the name TNT. Xiaojun was a singing contestant on the Zhejiang TV program X-Fire in November 2015.

Johnny, Yuta, Ten, Mark and Renjun joined the company via SM Global Auditions, while the remaining members were discovered through street casting, personal recommendation, community entertainment shows, and local auditions. Prior to their debut as members of NCT, 19 of the 23 overall members of NCT were introduced as part of SM Rookies, a group of trainees under SM Entertainment created in December 2013. The first members of NCT to be introduced were Taeyong and Jeno. Sixteen other members were introduced through SM Rookies until early January 2016.

Taeyong released the short rap track "Open the Door" in July 2014 and featured on Red Velvet's second single "Be Natural" in October of the same year. He appeared alongside Johnny, Yuta, Ten, Jaehyun, Mark, Jeno, Haechan, Jaemin and Jisung on the Mnet-produced Exo 90:2014, a show starring labelmates Exo, where they performed dances to K-pop songs from the 1990s. Some members appeared in various Exo music video remakes in the same year. From January through June 2015, Doyoung and Jaehyun were the hosts of the music show Show Champion; from July through December of that year, Yuta was a Japanese representative on Abnormal Summit, a series in which non-Korean men debate Korean culture. Mark, Jeno, Haechan, Jaemin and Jisung were Mouseketeers on Disney Channel Korea's The Mickey Mouse Club. SM Rookies Boys held their first concert, titled SM Rookies Show, which started in Seoul in September 2015 and expanded to Bangkok, Thailand in February 2016. Taeil released his first solo soundtrack "Because Of You" for the series The Merchant: Gaekju 2015 on January 26, 2016. In April 2016, Kun sang with NCT U on the Chinese version of "Without You" and joined them for the song's promotional stages. Winwin performed NCT U's "The 7th Sense" at their first live performance in China at the 16th Music Feng Yun Bang Awards that same month. In October 2016, Johnny participated in the music festival "Spectrum Dance Music Festival" as an SM Dreamstation Crew DJ.

SM Entertainment founder Lee Soo-man held a presentation at the SM Coex Artium titled "SM Town: Neo Culture Technology 2016" on January 28, 2016, where he outlined the company's plans for a new boy group in line with their "culture contents" strategy that would debut different teams based in different cities and countries around the world.

=== 2016–2018: Debut of NCT U, NCT 127 and NCT Dream and first collaborative project ===
On April 4, 2016, SM Entertainment announced NCT's first sub-unit would be NCT U, meaning "NCT United", which then consisted of six members: Taeil, Taeyong, Doyoung, Ten, Jaehyun and Mark. NCT U released the digital singles "The 7th Sense" on April 9 and "Without You" in two versions on April 10 (a Korean version sung by Taeil, Doyoung, and Jaehyun and a Chinese version with the addition of SM Rookies' Kun). On April 9, NCT U made their first broadcast appearance with NCT On Air on V Live hosted by Super Junior's Kim Hee-chul. The same day, they had their first live performance in China at the 16th Music Feng Yun Bang Awards alongside Chinese rookies Kun and Winwin. On April 15, the group made their debut in Korea on Music Bank.

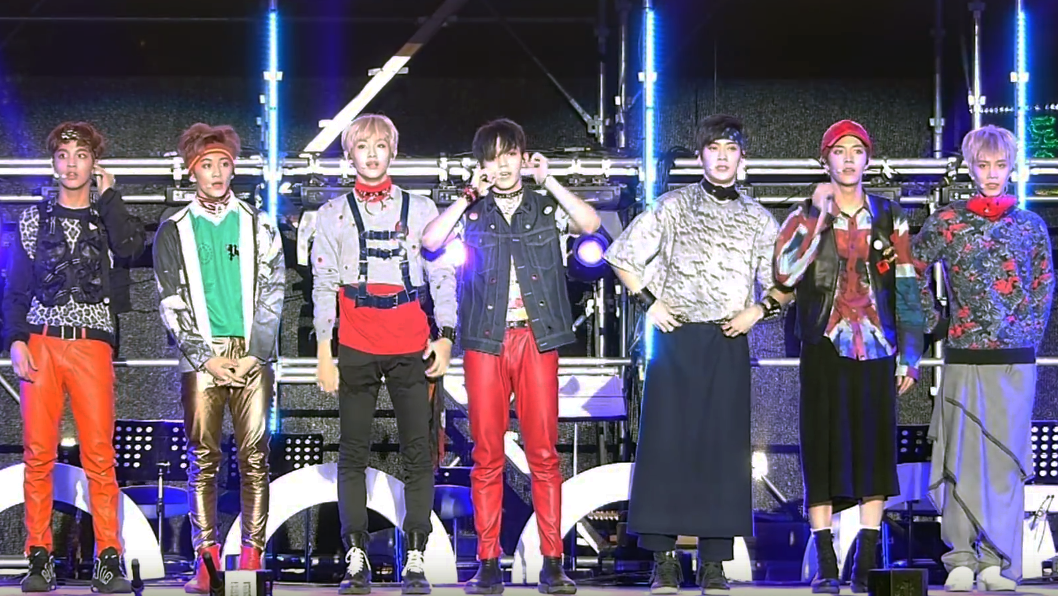
NCT 127's initial seven-member lineup performing in Busan.

On July 1, SM announced NCT's second sub-unit, NCT 127. The unit would be based in Seoul, the number "127" representing the longitude coordinate of the city. The unit debuted with seven members: Taeil, Taeyong, Yuta, Jaehyun, Winwin, Mark, and Haechan. On July 7, they had their official debut performance on the music program M Countdown, performing debut single "Fire Truck" and "Once Again." Their debut EP, NCT#127, was released digitally on July 10 and physically on July 11. On August 18, SM announced that NCT's third sub-unit would be NCT Dream. The unit debuted with seven members: Mark, Renjun, Jeno, Haechan, Jaemin, Chenle and Jisung. Their first single, "Chewing Gum", was released on August 24, and the group had their debut performance on M Countdown the next day.

On December 27, 2016, NCT 127 announced they would be making a comeback with two new members, Johnny and NCT U's Doyoung. On March 8, NCT 127 members Johnny and Jaehyun were announced as the DJs for SBS Power FM's new program, NCT's Night Night, which began airing on March 20. In January 2018, Taeil, Doyoung, and Jaehyun released the single "Timeless" under NCT U as part of the SM Station project.

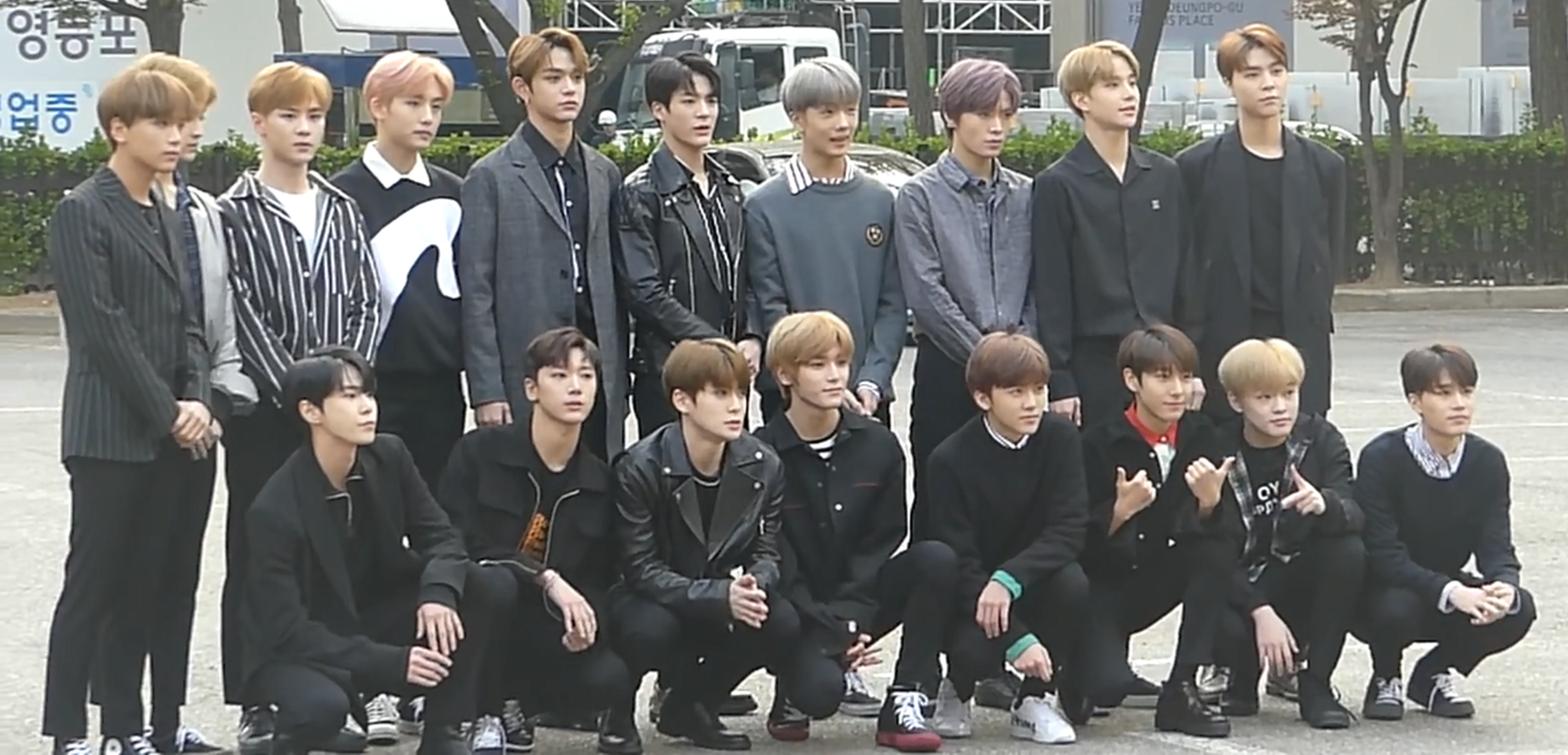
NCT 2018 at a Music Bank performance in April 2018.

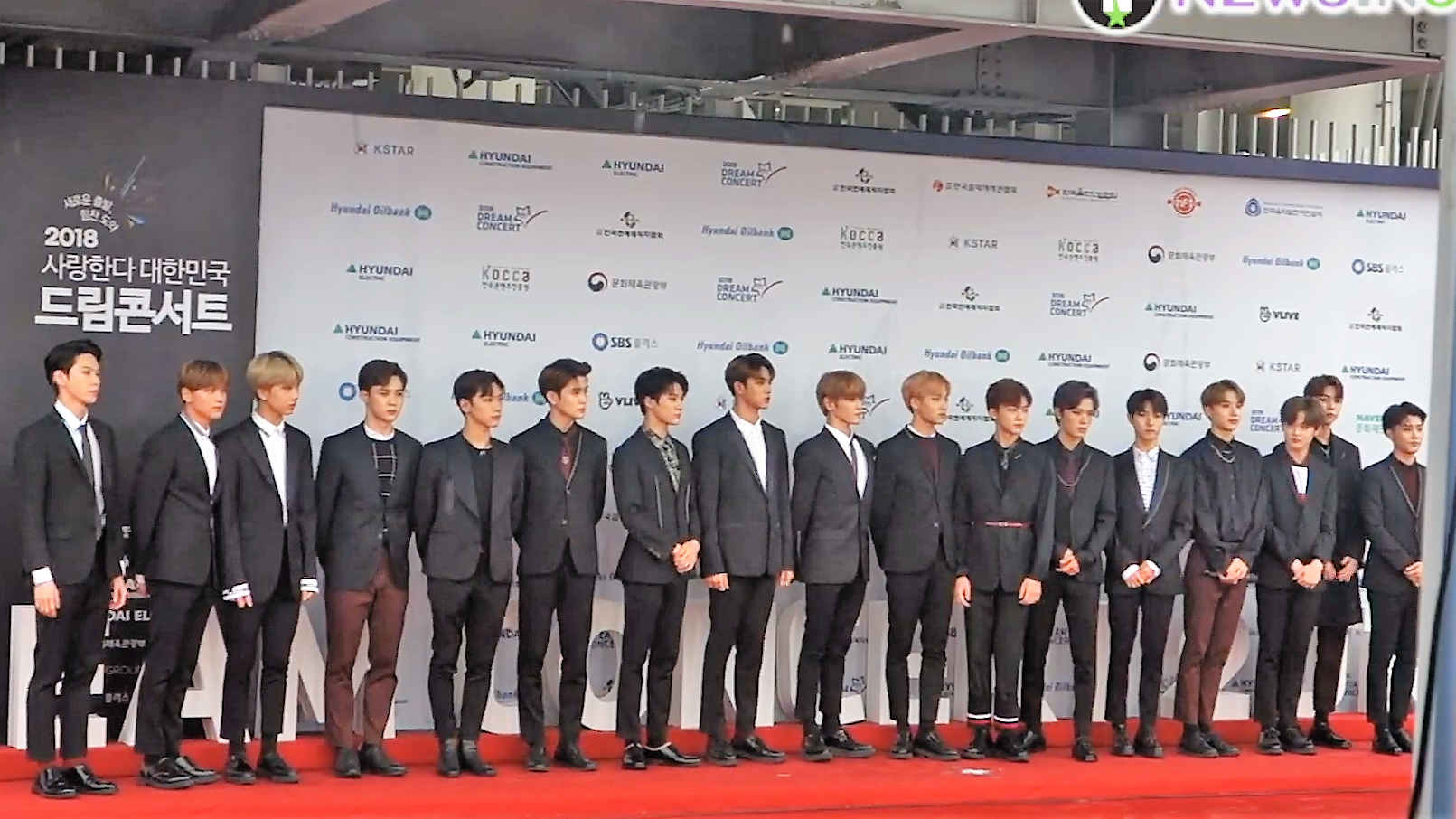
NCT at Dream Concert in May 2018.

Later that month, SM Entertainment unveiled NCT 2018, a project involving all 18 members of NCT at the time. On January 30, SM released a video titled "NCT 2018 Yearbook #1", which featured all prior members and introduced new members Kun, Lucas, and Jungwoo. In February, NCT released a series of online documentary videos titled NCTmentary as part of the NCT 2018 project. NCT released their first full-length album, NCT 2018 Empathy, on March 14. The album featured six singles, showcasing each sub-unit of NCT: "Boss", "Baby Don't Stop", and "Yestoday" by various NCT U lineups; "Go" by NCT Dream; "Touch" by NCT 127; and "Black on Black" with all 18 members. NCT topped Billboard's Emerging Artists chart on May 5, marking the first time that a K-pop act had led the list.

Mark graduated from NCT Dream after the release of their second EP, We Go Up, in September. On September 11, Xiaojun was the first of the then-undebuted WayV members to be introduced through SM Rookies, with Hendery and Yangyang following on September 13 and September 15, respectively. Jungwoo was added to NCT 127 in October, with the release of their first studio album, Regular-Irregular. Winwin did not participate in promotional activities of the album's reissue, Regulate, in order to prepare for his debut with WayV, and his activities in NCT 127 have been discontinued since then.

=== 2019–2020: Debut of WayV, NCT Dream restructure and NCT 2020 Resonance ===
On December 31, 2018, SM Entertainment announced NCT's fourth sub-unit, WayV (Chinese: 威神V; pinyin: Wēi shén V) under Label V. The unit would be based in China and consists of seven members: Kun, Winwin, Ten, Lucas, Hendery, Xiaojun and Yangyang. The sub-unit officially debuted on January 17, 2019, with a Chinese version of NCT 127's "Regular". Their debut single album, The Vision, was released digitally and included a Chinese version of NCT 127's "Come Back" and an original song titled "Dream Launch". On December 13, NCT U (consisting of Taeil, Doyoung, Jaehyun and Haechan) released "Coming Home" as part of the SM Station X project. After wrapping up album promotions for their EP Reload in April, NCT Dream abandoned their original concept in which members "graduate" from the sub-unit upon reaching age of majority (20 in Korean age reckoning, 19 internationally) and continued as seven members, with Mark returning to the lineup.

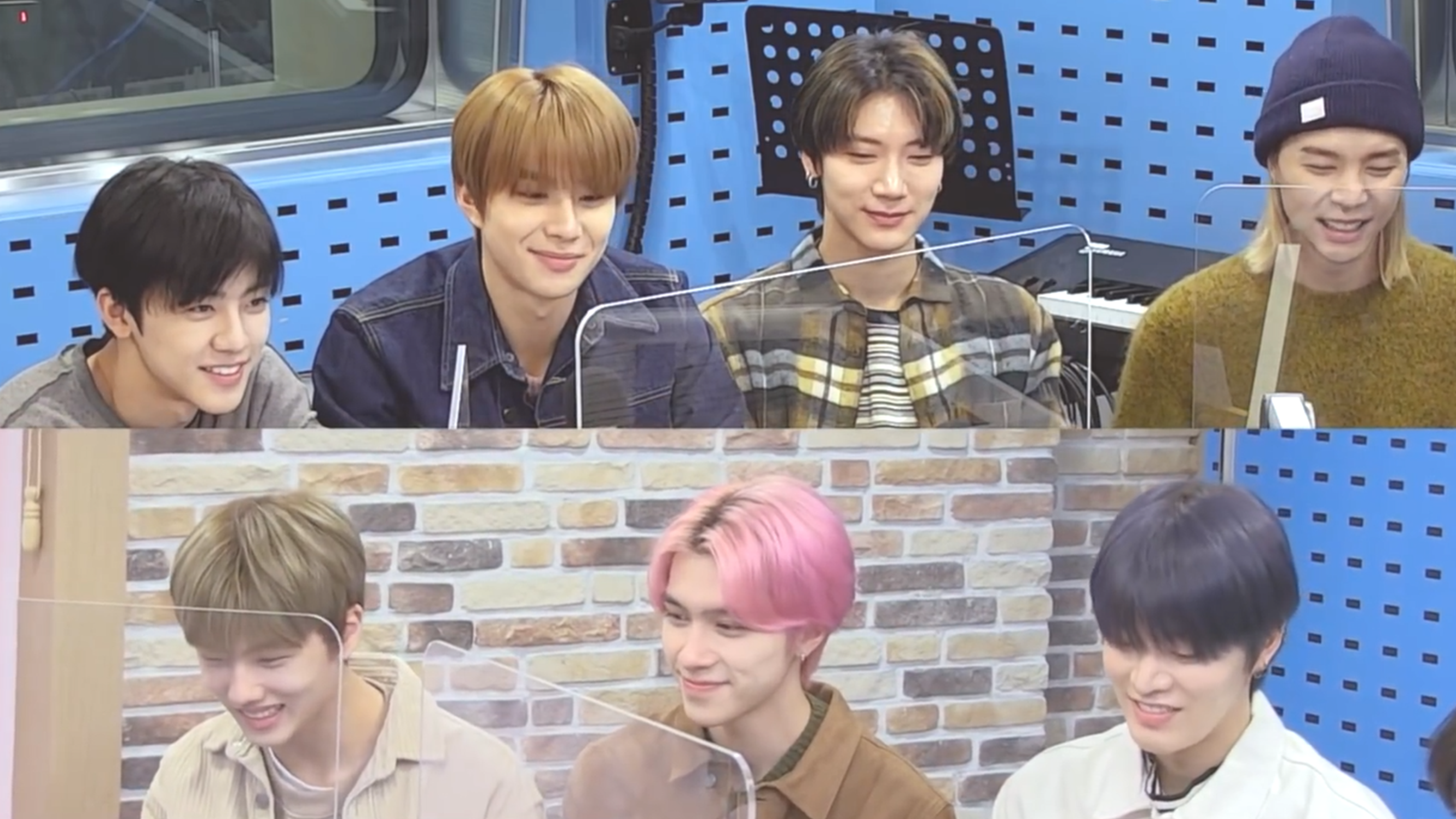
The NCT U unit for the single "Work It" promoting at a radio show.

In September, NCT announced a reunion for a second group project, NCT 2020, in October 2020. The first part of their second album, NCT 2020 Resonance Pt. 1, was released on October 12. The record featured all four existing units and two new members, Shotaro and Sungchan, who are set to debut with a future NCT unit. NCT 2020 Resonance Pt. 1 garnered more than 1.1 million stock pre-orders ahead of release, making it NCT's first million-selling album without repackaging. NCT released NCT 2020 Resonance Pt. 2 on November 23.

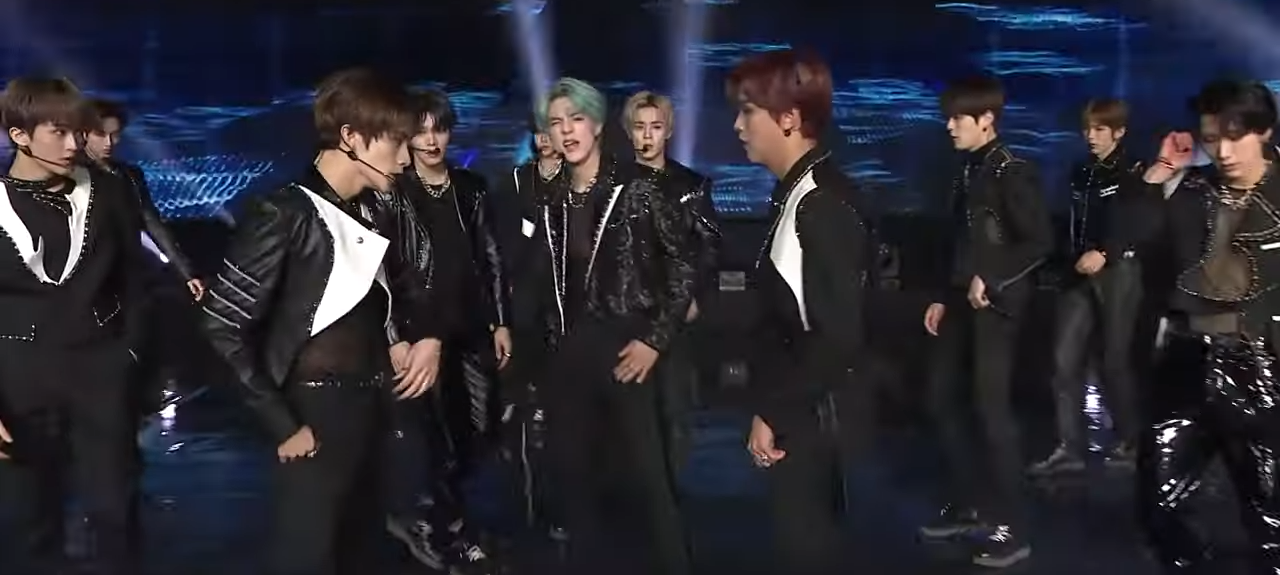
【TV初放送】Beyond LIVE – NCT RESONANCE (2)

On December 4, NCT released the single "Resonance" as the finale of their second group studio album. The single combines the tracks "Make a Wish (Birthday Song)", "90's Love", "Work It", and "Raise the Roof" from their second studio album and features all 23 members. They held their first concert as a full group, titled NCT: Resonance "Global Wave", on December 27 through Beyond Live, which attracted more than 200,000 viewers.

=== 2021–2023: Universe, new sub-units, end of expansion, member departures, and Golden Age ===
On November 13, 2021, NCT announced they would reunite under the name NCT 2021 for their third studio album, Universe, set for release on December 14. The 13-track album included the lead singles "Universe (Let's Play Ball)", which was released on December 10, and "Beautiful". Universe surpassed more than 1.7 million pre-orders on the day of release, breaking their previous record of 1.1 million pre-orders for NCT 2020 Resonance.

On February 4, 2022, the SM Station sub-project NCT Lab was established, dedicated to releasing solo music for NCT members. The first single was "Child" by Mark, followed by "Conextion (Age of Light)", sung by Doyoung, Mark and Haechan. NCT Lab was restructured in 2023 to be independent from SM Station, with SM Entertainment announcing a lineup of new singles beginning with "Horizon" by Jaehyun, released on August 8, 2023.

On February 3, 2023, SM Entertainment announced their producing strategy for 2023, where it was revealed that the group's next unit, NCT Tokyo, (Note: Tentative name; promoted as NCT New Team) will be debuting in the third quarter of 2023. On February 24, SM revealed their plans for the first half of 2023, where they announced that following NCT Tokyo's debut, the group's concept of international expansion would come to an end, permanently fixing the group at five sub-units. On March 8, SM Entertainment announced that members Doyoung, Jaehyun, and Jungwoo would debut as a fixed sub-unit, named NCT DoJaeJung. On April 17, they released their first EP Perfume, alongside its lead single of the same name.

On May 10, 2023, Lucas confirmed his departure from NCT and WayV to pursue individual endeavors, following a 21-month hiatus. On May 24, Sungchan and Shotaro departed from NCT to join SM Entertainment's new boy group Riize. It was also announced that SM Rookies trainees Eunseok and Seunghan, who were expected to debut in NCT Tokyo and had previously appeared in the variety show Welcome to NCT Universe, would join Riize.

On June 5, 2023, Taeyong released his first EP, Shalala, becoming the first member of NCT to debut as a soloist. On July 27, SM Entertainment aired the survival reality show NCT Universe: LASTART, where trainees competed to debut as part of NCT's final sub-unit. Among ten contestants, five were chosen to join SM Rookies trainees Yushi and Sion in the lineup of NCT Tokyo, now known as NCT New Team: Sion, Riku, Yushi, Jungmin, Daeyoung, Ryo, Sakuya.

On August 28, 2023, NCT reunited for their fourth studio album, Golden Age. The album contains two singles, "Golden Age" and "Baggy Jeans", with the latter reuniting the members from NCT U's debut single "The 7th Sense". They later held five full-group concerts, titled NCT Nation: To The World. They performed at the Incheon Munhak Stadium in South Korea and at the Yanmar Stadium Nagai and Ajinomoto Stadium in Japan, with NCT New Team serving as the opening act for the Japan shows. On October 2, Jungmin departed from NCT New Team for health reasons, with the unit's final lineup consisting of six members. On October 8, NCT New Team released their pre-debut single "Hands Up"; the "New Team" subunit later officially debuted as NCT Wish on February 28, 2024.

=== 2024–present: NCT members solo debut, NCT JNJM, and Mark and Winwin's departures ===
In 2024, four NCT members made their debut as soloists: Ten released his self-titled EP on February 13, followed by Doyoung with the studio album Youth on April 22, Jaehyun with the studio album J on August 26, and Yuta with the EP Depth on October 5. On August 28, Taeil was removed from NCT following sexual offense allegations.

In 2026, SM Entertainment announced the formation of the seventh NCT sub-unit consisting of members Jeno and Jaemin, named NCT JNJM, and released their first EP Both Sides, on February 23. SM Entertainment announced on April 3, that Mark would conclude his contract on April 8, exactly ten years after his initial debut. The agency stated that the decision followed an "extensive conversations" regarding his future path. Consequently, Mark would also depart from all NCT sub-units, including NCT 127 and NCT Dream.

On July 8, 2026, SM announced that Winwin's contract concludes on July 9, thus he is leaving both NCT and its subunit WayV.

== Members ==
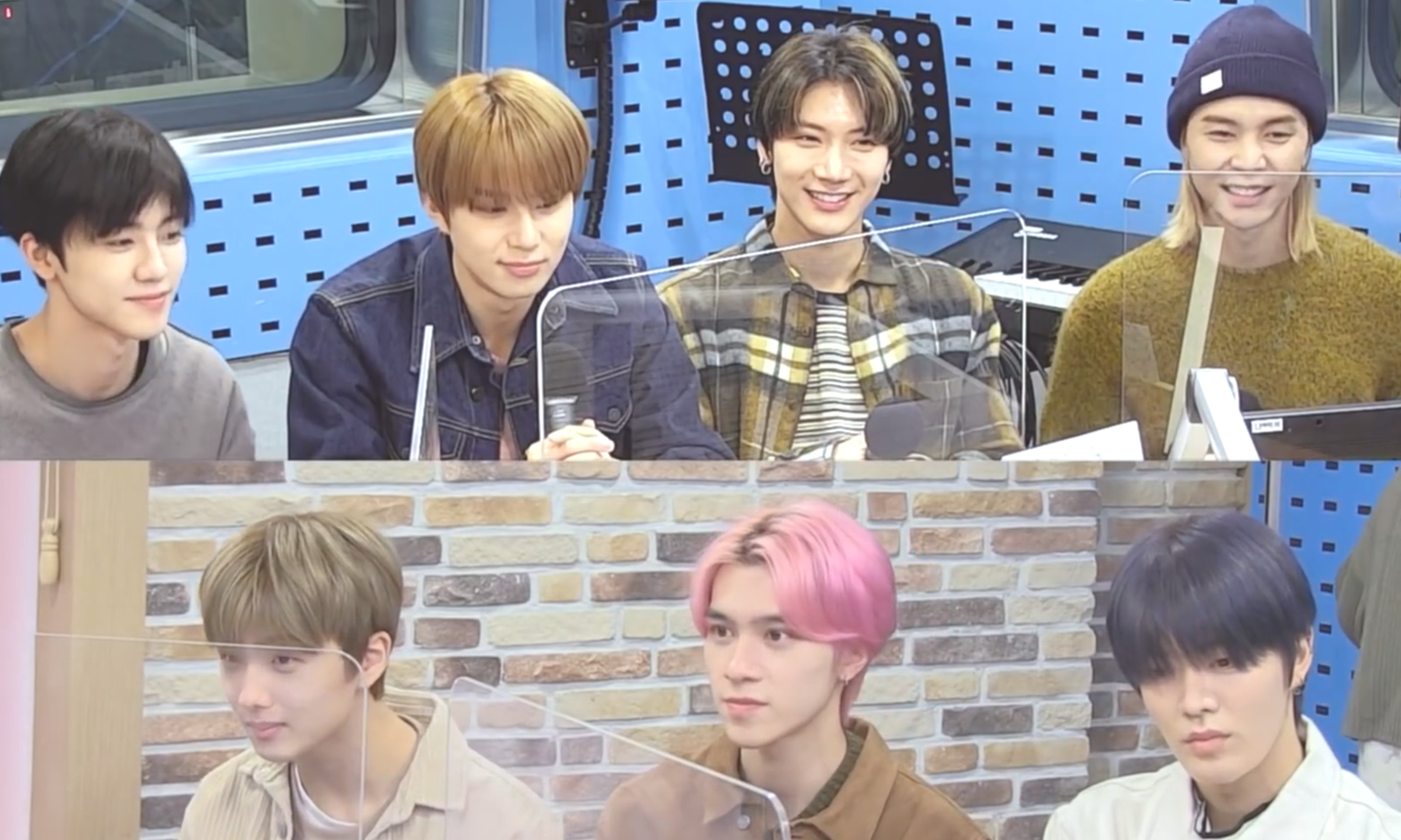
NCT U at SBS Radio in November 2020.

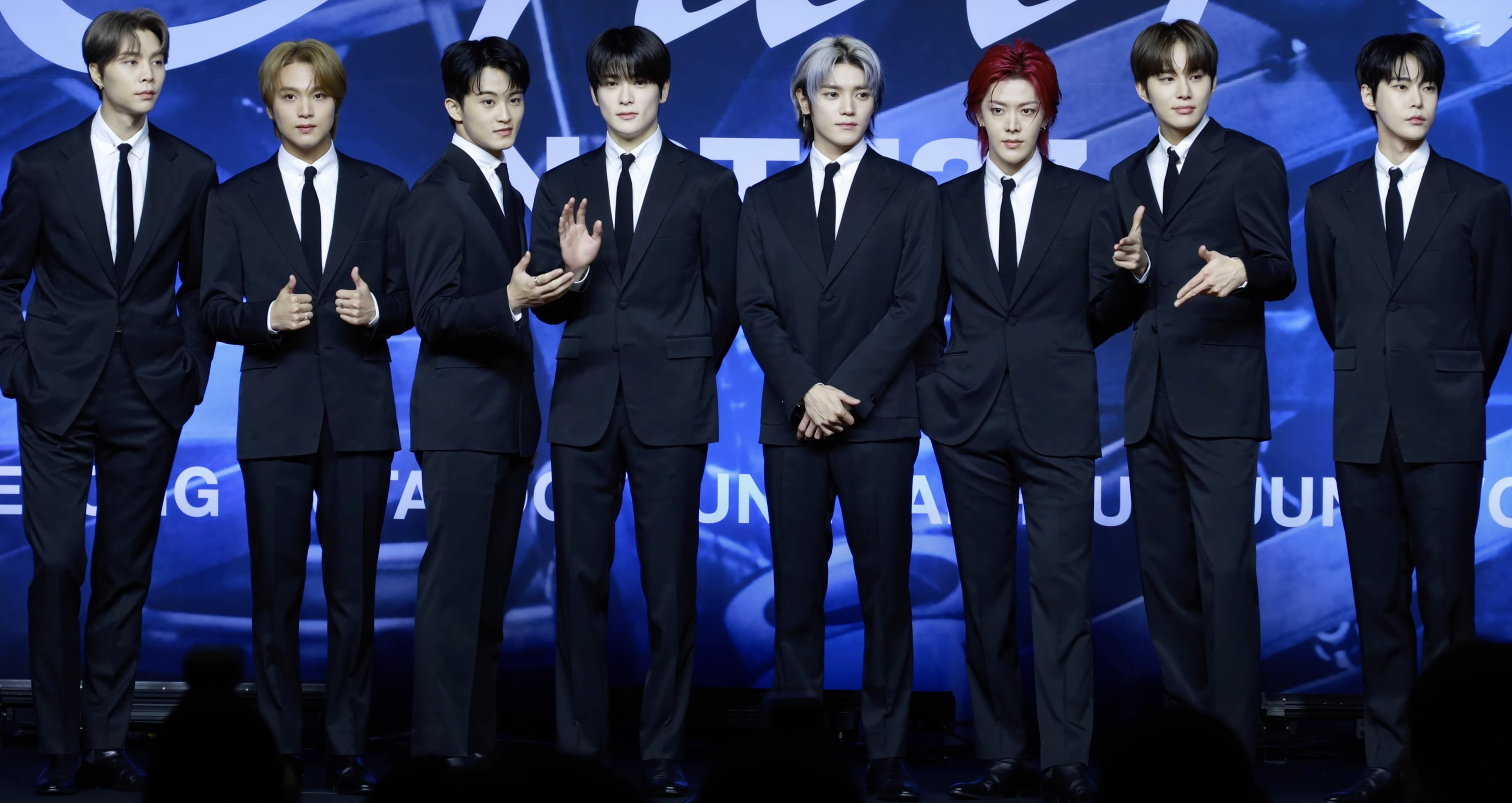
NCT 127 in October 2023 (From left: Johnny, Haechan, Mark, Jaehyun, Taeyong, Yuta, Jungwoo, and Doyoung)

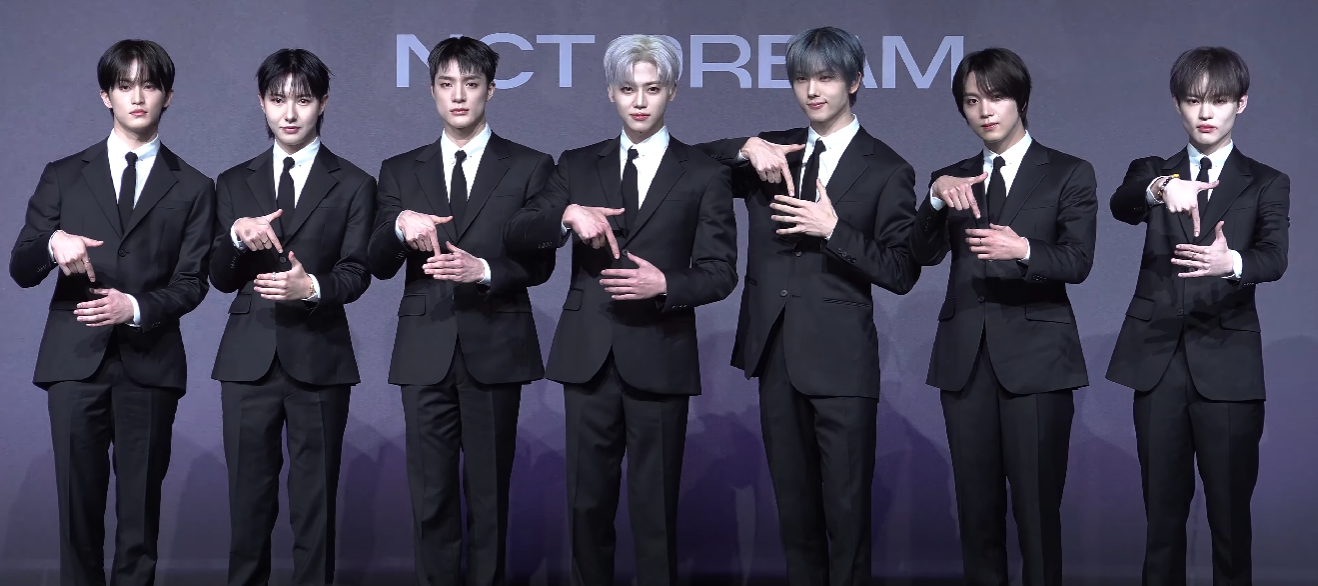
NCT Dream in March 2024 (From left: Mark, Renjun, Jeno, Jaemin, Jisung, Haechan, and Chenle)

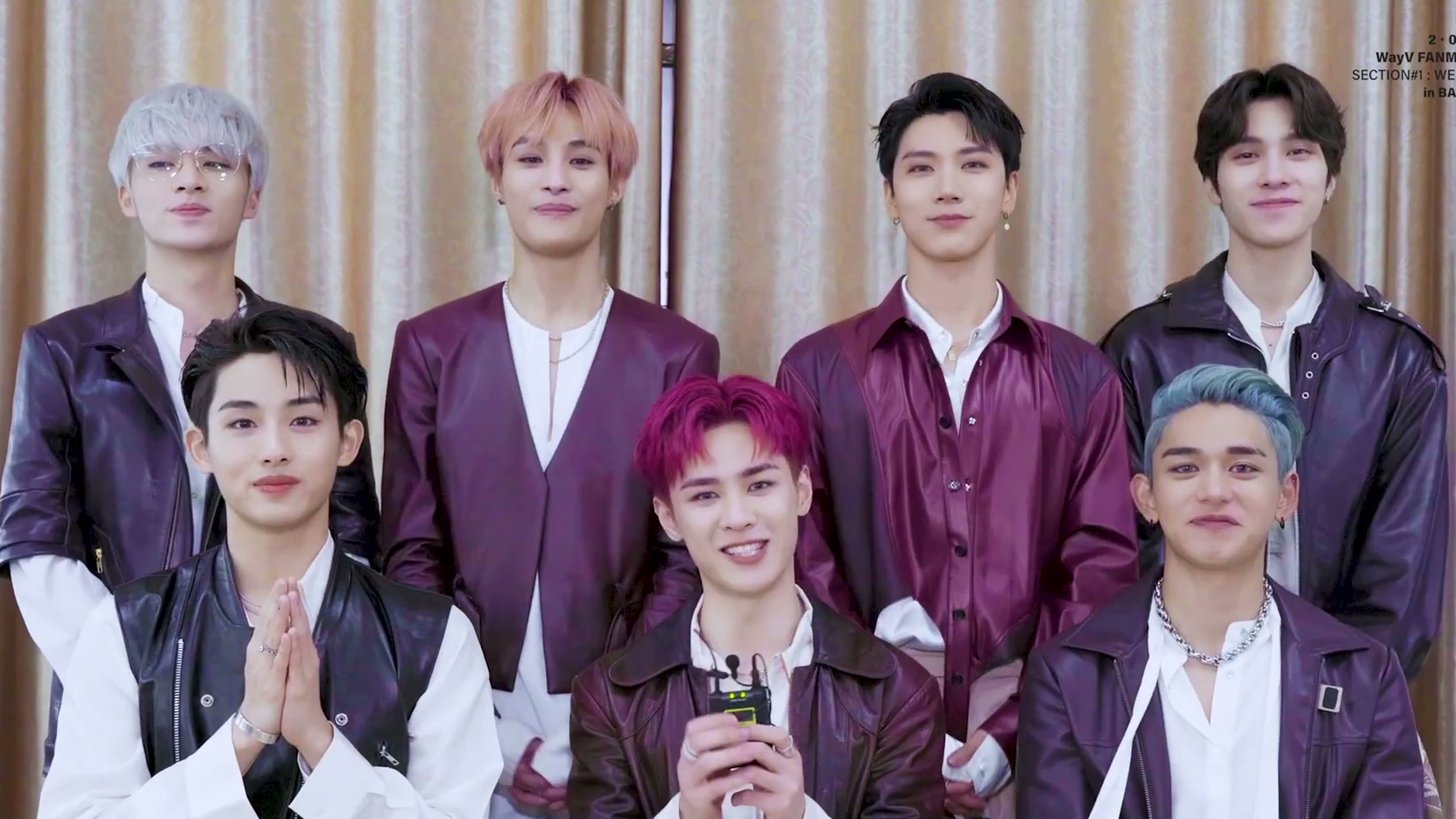
WayV in December 2019 (From left, standing: Xiaojun, Yangyang, Ten, Hendery, sitting: Winwin, Kun, and Lucas)

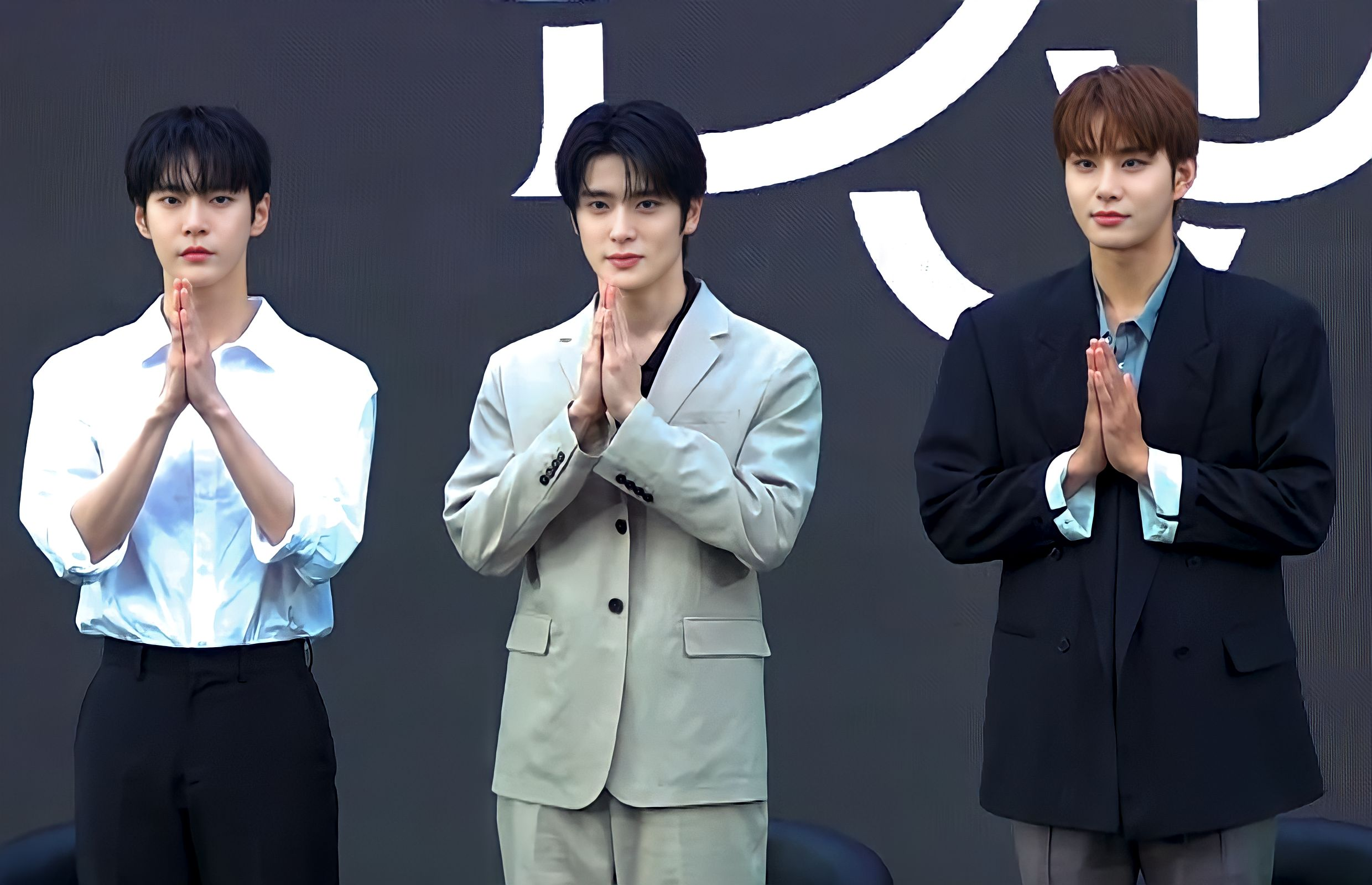
NCT DoJaeJung in June 2023 (From left: Doyoung, Jaehyun and Jungwoo)

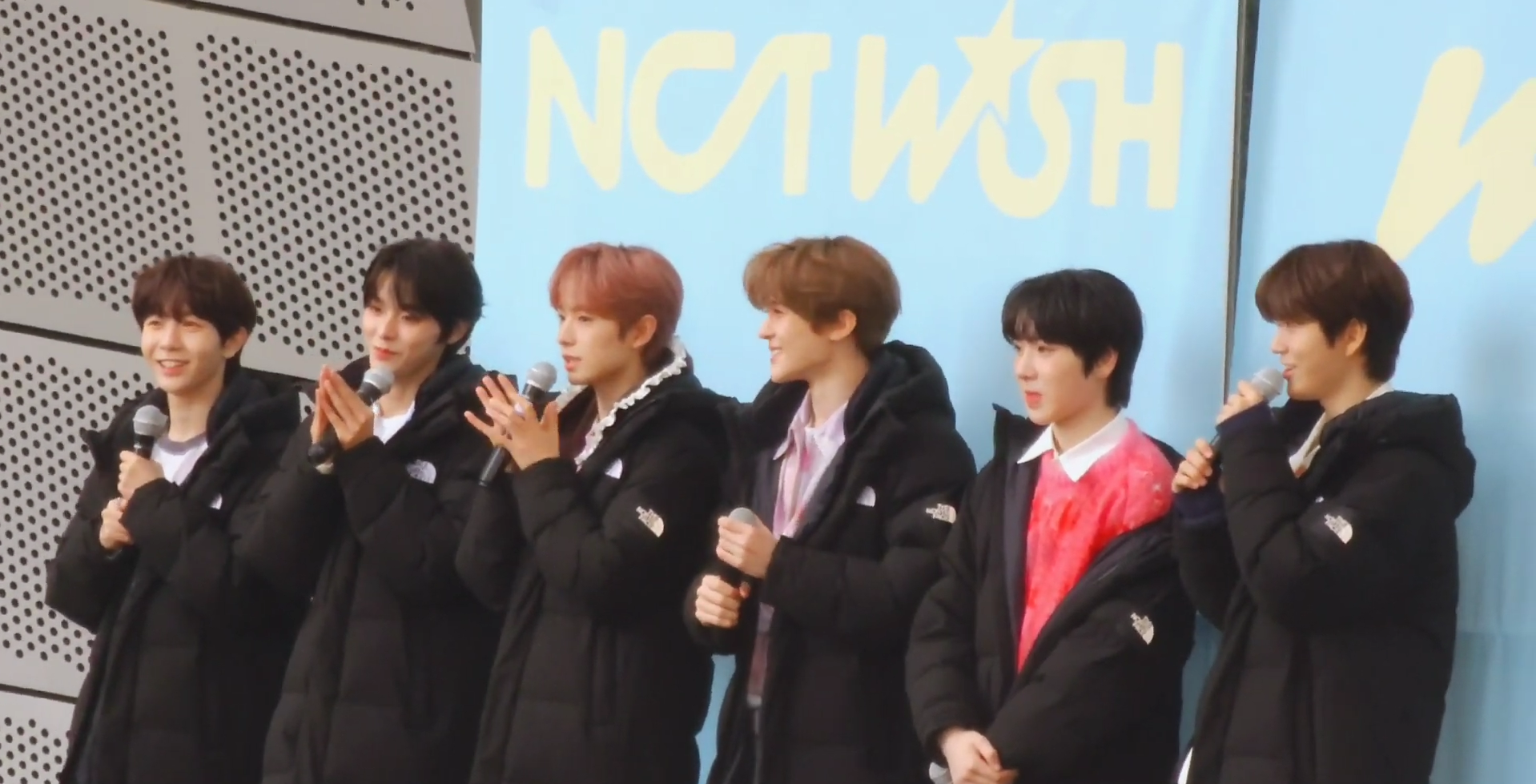
NCT Wish in March 2024 (From left: Ryo, Riku, Yushi, Sion, Sakuya, and Jaehee)

Adapted from the group's profile on SM Entertainment's official website.

=== Current members ===
Name	Debut date	Country	Sub-units						
Name	Debut date	Country	U	127	Dream	WayV	DJJ	Wish	JNJM
Taeyong (Note: NCT Leader)	April 9, 2016	South Korea		★					
Doyoung	April 9, 2016	South Korea							
Ten	April 9, 2016	Thailand							
Jaehyun	April 9, 2016	South Korea							
Yuta	July 7, 2016	Japan							
Haechan	July 7, 2016	South Korea							
Renjun	August 25, 2016	China							
Jeno	August 25, 2016	South Korea							
Jaemin	August 25, 2016	South Korea							
Chenle	August 25, 2016	China							
Jisung	August 25, 2016	South Korea							
Johnny	January 6, 2017	United States							
Jungwoo	February 18, 2018	South Korea							
Kun	March 14, 2018 (Note: Kun previously featured in the Chinese version of "Without You", as a member of SM Rookies. However, Kun did not make his official debut as a member of NCT until March 14, 2018, with NCT 2018 Empathy.)	China				★			
Xiaojun	January 17, 2019	China							
Hendery	January 17, 2019	Macau							
Yangyang	January 17, 2019	Taiwan							
Sion	February 21, 2024	South Korea						★	
Riku	February 21, 2024	Japan							
Yushi	February 21, 2024	Japan							
Jaehee	February 21, 2024	South Korea							
Ryo	February 21, 2024	Japan							
Sakuya	February 21, 2024	Japan							
"★" denotes sub-unit leader

=== Former members ===
List of former members of NCT.
Name	Debut date	Country/Region	Sub-units	Notes
Taeil	April 9, 2016	South Korea	NCT U; NCT 127	Departed on August 28, 2024
Mark	April 9, 2016	Canada	NCT U; NCT 127; NCT Dream	Departed on April 8, 2026
WinWin	July 7, 2016	China	NCT U; NCT 127; WayV	Began hiatus in June 2024; departed on July 9, 2026
Lucas	February 18, 2018	Hong Kong	NCT U; WayV	Began hiatus in August 2021; departed on May 10, 2023
Shotaro	October 12, 2020	Japan	NCT U	Departed on May 24, 2023, transferred to Riize
Sungchan	October 12, 2020	South Korea	NCT U	Departed on May 24, 2023, transferred to Riize

== Discography ==
- NCT 2018 Empathy (2018)
- NCT 2020 Resonance (2020)
- Universe (2021)
- Golden Age (2023)

== Concerts ==
- NCT: Resonance "Global Wave" (2020)
- NCT Nation: To the World (2023)

NCT Stadium Live 'NCT Nation: To the World'
Date	City	Country	Venue	Attendance
August 26, 2023	Incheon	South Korea	Incheon Munhak Stadium	—
September 9, 2023	Osaka	Japan	Yanmar Stadium Nagai	220,000
September 10, 2023	Osaka	Japan	Yanmar Stadium Nagai	220,000
September 16, 2023	Tokyo	Japan	Ajinomoto Stadium	220,000
September 17, 2023	Tokyo	Japan	Ajinomoto Stadium	220,000

== Filmography ==
- NCT Life
- NCT World 2.0
- Welcome to NCT Universe
- NCT Universe: Lastart
