= Perfume (NCT DoJaeJung song) =

- iScreaM Vol.24: Perfume Remixes cover

Single by NCT DoJaeJung

from the EP Perfume
- Language: Korean
- Released: April 17, 2023
- Studio: SM LVYIN (Seoul); SM Yellow Tail (Seoul)
- Genre: R&B; electropop
- Length: 2:47
- Label: SM
- Composers: Brandon Arreaga; Colin Magalong; Landon Sears; Kaelyn Behr; MZMC
- Lyricist: Kim Su-min
- Producers: Styalz Fuego; MZMC

NCT singles chronology
"Beatbox (English version)" (2023)	"Perfume" (2023)

Music video
- "Perfume" on YouTube

"Perfume" is a song recorded by South Korean boy band NCT DoJaeJung for their debut extended play (EP) of the same name. Composed by Styalz Fuego, MZMC, Brandon Arreaga, Colin Magalong, Landon Sears, and Kaelyn Behr, with lyrics written by Kim Su-min, the song was released on April 17, 2023, by SM Entertainment. An accompanying music video was released on the same date. "Perfume" is described as an R&B electropop song that expresses mature and sensuous messages of "wanting to leave a scent to a significant other".

"Perfume" received positive reviews from music critics and became a commercial success. It debuted at number four on the Circle Digital Chart, making NCT DoJaeJung the fastest NCT sub-unit to earn a top-five single in South Korea. It also debuted at number one on Circle Download Chart and Circle BGM Chart. Remixes by Jafunk, and Bronze and Jason Lee, titled iScreaM Vol.24: Perfume Remixes, were released on July 13.

== Background and composition ==
"Perfume" was composed by Brandon Arreaga, Colin Magalong, Landon Sears, Kaelyn Behr, and MZMC, with the lattermost also producing the song alongside Styalz Fuego. It marks MZMC's first production under SM Entertainment following his hiatus from the company in 2020. "Perfume" is an R&B electropop song, consisting of rhythmic slab guitar, synth pad, boom bap rhythm sound, and groovy electric bass line. The members' a cappella vocals and harmonies are also highlighted in the song. The lyrics, which were written by Kim Su-min, describe the "desire to leave one's scent to their loved one so they would not be forgotten."

== Music video ==
The music video for "Perfume" was released on April 17, 2023, alongside the single and album release. It was filmed in Bangkok, Thailand and featured the members dancing in outdoor vibrant sets, as well as the interiors and exteriors of a mansion. The first part of the music video is set in daylight, with the members wearing light-colored outfits, while the latter shows the members in darker and sexier outfits in the nighttime. One section also features them riding in a red 1960 Chevrolet Impala convertible and taking mugshots. The music video also stars a woman, shown to be gifted a set of perfumes by the members.

== Critical reception ==
On NME's midyear list of the best K-pop songs of 2023, Ivana E. Morales wrote that the song "a luxurious, aural throwback to the ’90s, swimming in gorgeous vocals and enthralling transitions, making it an elegant detour" and called it "one of the greatest K-pop gifts from this year so far".

== Accolades ==
Music program awards
Program	Date	Ref.
Music Bank	April 28, 2023	
Show! Music Core	April 29, 2023	

Year-end lists for "Perfume"
Critic/Publication	List	Rank	Ref.
Dazed	Top 50 best K-pop tracks of 2023	41	
Grammy	15 K-Pop Songs That Took 2023 By Storm	N/A	
NME	The 50 best songs of 2023	45	

== Track listing ==
- Digital download and streaming (iScreaM Vol.24: Perfume Remixes)
1. "Perfume" (Jafunk remix) – 2:48
2. "Perfume" (Bronze & Jason Lee remix) – 3:11

== Charts ==
=== Weekly charts ===
Weekly chart performance for "Perfume"
Chart (2023)	Peak position
Singapore Regional (RIAS)	29
South Korea (Circle)	4

=== Monthly charts ===
Monthly chart performance for "Perfume"
Chart (2023)	Position
South Korea (Circle)	48

== Credits and personnel ==
Credits adapted from the liner notes of Perfume.

=== Studio ===
- SM LVYIN Studio – recording
- SM Yellow Tail Studio – recording
- SM Concert Hall – mixing
- 821 Sound Mastering – mastering

=== Personnel ===
- SM Entertainment – executive producer
- Lee Sung-soo – production director, executive supervisor
- Tak Young-jun – executive supervisor
- Yoo Young-jin – music and sound supervisor
- NCT DoJaeJung – vocals, background vocals
- Kim Su-min (153/Joombas) – lyrics
- Brandon Arreaga – composition, background vocals
- Colin Magalong – composition
- Landon Sears – composition
- Styalz Fuego – producer, composition, arrangement
- MZMC – producer, composition, arrangement
- Young Chance – vocal directing
- Noh Min-ji – recording
- Lee Ji-hong – recording
- Woo Min-jeong – digital editing
- Nam Koong-jin – mixing
- Kwon Nam-woo – mastering

== Release history ==
Release dates and formats for "Perfume"
Region	Date	Format	Version	Label
Various	April 17, 2023	Digital download; streaming	Original	SM
Various	July 13, 2023	Digital download; streaming	Remixes	ScreaM; SM
