= Perfume (EP) =

- Digital cover

EP by NCT DoJaeJung
- Released: April 17, 2023
- Genres: K-pop; R&B
- Length: 19:25
- Language: Korean
- Label: SM

NCT chronology
Phantom (2022)	Perfume (2023)	ISTJ (2023)

Singles from Perfume
- 1. "Perfume" Released: April 17, 2023

Perfume is the debut extended play (EP) by the South Korean boy band NCT DoJaeJung. It was released on April 17, 2023, by SM Entertainment, alongside its lead single of the same name. It is NCT DoJaeJung's first release, following initial participation as members of NCT and its sub-unit NCT 127. Consisting of six romantic songs, it features participation from multiple songwriters and producers, including MZMC, Styalz Fuego, LDN Noise, and others.

Perfume received positive reviews from critics, who praised NCT DoJaeJung's vocals and the songs' composition, citing its difference from NCT's usual hip hop and experimental music. The romantic theme of the EP was also noted by critics, which NME describes as "an indulgent tale of a torrid romance in six parts." It also earned commercial success both digitally and physically, selling 841,976 copies on the Circle Album Chart as of June 2, 2023, making it the best-selling debut album by an SM Entertainment act and the best-selling album by a K-pop sub-unit. It previously held the record for the highest first week sales for a sub-unit with a total of 672,374 units on the Hanteo Chart.

== Background and release ==
On March 22, 2023, SM Entertainment announced that NCT DoJaeJung will debut with their first extended play. Promotions began on March 26, with teaser videos and photos released on the group's social media accounts. Three music films starring each member were released, namely: Passion, Commitment, and Intimacy, for which the concept was based on Robert Sternberg's triangular theory of love. Snippets of the album's side tracks were revealed through the music films as well. On April 17, 2023, Perfume was released digitally and physically worldwide.

== Promotion ==
On April 16, 2023, a launch event and press conference were held at the Seoul Wave Art Center before the official release of the EP, where they performed "Strawberry Sunday" and "Dive", and unveiled the performance videos for "Perfume" and "Kiss". Hosted by Johnny of NCT, it was also attended by numerous celebrities, including Yeri and Seulgi of Red Velvet, Taeyong and Taeil of NCT, Changmin of TVXQ, Taeyeon of Girls' Generation, and theater actress Kim So-hyun. Several South Korean representatives of high-end fashion magazines such as Vogue, Elle, and Harper's Bazaar were also present at the event. A public exhibition was later held at the Seoul Wave Art Center, and three local pop-up stores were made available from April 18 to April 30. A large perfume bottle sculpture was also installed outside of SM Entertainment's headquarters in Seongsu-dong, which emits a scent specifically created for NCT DoJaeJung.

The lead single "Perfume" was initially set to be promoted in South Korean music shows alongside the side track "Kiss", beginning from April 20, 2023. SM Entertainment later announced that promotional schedules had been postponed due to Jaehyun's health issues. The rescheduled promotions on music shows then began on April 27 and concluded on May 7.

On June 24, 2023, NCT DoJaeJung held the EP's accompanying fan concert, titled "Scented Symphony: Perfume", at the SM Mall of Asia Arena in Manila, Philippines.

== Composition and lyrics ==
The lead single "Perfume" is described as an R&B electro-pop song, consisting of rhythmic slab guitar, synth pad, boom bap rhythm sound, and groovy electric bass line. The members' a cappella vocals are also highlighted in the song. The lyrics express mature and sensuous messages of "wanting to leave a scent to a significant other". The second track "Kiss" is a medium-tempo R&B song with a "dreamy atmosphere". The third track "Dive" is medium-tempo R&B with lyrics that describe one's feelings of deeply falling in love.

The fourth track "Can We Go Back", which was first performed by NCT DoJaeJung at the Seoul Olympic Stadium for NCT 127's Neo City – The Link+ concerts in October 2022, is an R&B song composed of an acoustic guitar melody and portrays a person who wants to return to the past "out of suffering from a terrible aftermath of a breakup." The fifth track "Strawberry Sunday" is described as an upbeat R&B funk song, composed of lyrics about the "excitement of being with a significant other." Lastly, the sixth track "Ordinary" is a ballad with the emotional portrayal of writing "honest feelings that cannot be conveyed to a loved one."

== Critical reception ==
Professional ratings
Review scores
Source	Rating
NME	3/5 stars

In a review for NME, Carmen Chin rated the album three out of five stars, opining that although it was safer than expected for a group known for its "unabashed experimentation", the record still displayed "masterful storytelling and dulcet vocals".

== Track listing ==
Perfume track listing
No.	Title	Lyrics	Music	Arrangement	Length
1.	"Perfume"	Kim Su-min (153/Joombas)	Brandon Arreaga; Colin Magalong; Landon Sears; Kaelyn Behr; MZMC	Styalz Fuego; MZMC	2:47
2.	"Kiss"	Park Lang (Verygoods)	Sevn Dayz; Jeffrey the Kidd; Greg Bonnick; Hayden Chapman; Young Chance; Jay Jay	Jay Jay; LDN Noise	3:00
3.	"Dive"	Ji Yu-ri (Jam Factory)	Bonnick; Chapman; Lauren Faith	LDN Noise	3:56
4.	"Strawberry Sunday"	Jo Yoon-kyung	JBach; Mishon Ratliff; David Wilson; MZMC	DWilly; MZMC	2:58
5.	"Can We Go Back" (후유증)	Kang Eun-jeong	Adam Korbesmeyer; Jerry Lang II; Lena Leon; Jacqueline Young; Ori Dulitzki	Korbesmeyer; Lang II	3:23
6.	"Ordinary" (안녕)	MinGtion	MinGtion	MinGtion	3:18
Total length:					19:25

== Credits and personnel ==
Credits adapted from the liner notes of Perfume.

=== Studio ===
- SM LVYIN Studio – recording (track 1), mixing (track 3)
- SM Yellow Tail Studio – recording (track 2, 3, 5), engineered for mix (track 4)
- SM Ssam Studio – recording (track 2, 3), digital editing (track 3), engineered for mix (track 6)
- Sound Pool Studio – recording (track 6)
- Doobdoob Studio – recording (track 4, 6), digital editing (track 4)
- SM Concert Hall Studio – mixing (track 1, 5)
- SM Blue Ocean Studio – mixing (track 6)
- SM Big Shot Studio – mixing (track 2)
- SM Starlight Studio – mixing (track 4), engineered for mix (track 4)
- 821 Sound Mastering – mastering (all tracks)

=== Personnel ===
- SM Entertainment – executive producer
- Lee Sung-soo – production director, executive supervisor
- Tak Young-jun – executive supervisor
- Yoo Young-jin – music and sound supervisor (all tracks)
- NCT DoJaeJung – vocals (all tracks), background vocals (track 1)
  - Doyoung – background vocals (track 2, 3, 5)
- Kim Su-min (153/Joombas) – lyrics (track 1)
- Park Lang (Verygoods) – lyrics (track 2)
- Ji Yu-ri (JamFactory) – lyrics (track 3)
- Jo Yoon-kyung – lyrics (track 4)
- Kang Eun-jeong – lyrics (track 5)
- MinGtion – lyrics, composition, keyboard, digital editing, arrangement (track 6), vocal directing (track 4, 6)
- Brandon Arreaga – composition, background vocals (track 1)
- Colin Magalong – composition (track 1)
- Landon Sears – composition (track 1)
- Kaelyn Behr – composition (track 1)
- MZMC – composition, arrangement (track 1, 4)
- Sevn Dayz – composition (track 2)
- Jeffrey The Kidd – composition (track 2)
- Greg Bonnick – composition (track 2, 3)
- Hayden Chapman – composition (track 2, 3)
- Jay Jay – composition, arrangement (track 2)
- LDN Noise – arrangement (track 2, 3)
- Lauren Faith – composition (track 3)
- JBach – composition (track 4)
- Mishon Ratliff – composition (track 4)
- David Wilson (DWilly) – composition, arrangement (track 4)
- Adam Korbesmeyer – composition (track 5)
- Jerry Lang II – composition, arrangement (track 5)
- Lena Leon – composition (track 5)
- Jacqueline Young – composition (track 5)
- Ori Dulitzki – composition (track 5)
- Oiaisle – background vocals (track 4)
- Young Chance – vocal directing (track 1, 2), digital editing (track 2)
- Seo Mi-rae (Butterfly) – vocal directing (track 3)
- Joo Chan-yang (Pollen) – vocal directing (track 5)
- Noh Min-ji – recording (track 1–3, 5), engineered for mix (track 4)
- Lee Ji-hong – recording (track 1), mixing (track 3)
- Kang Eun-ji – recording (track 2, 3, 6), digital editing (track 3)
- Kwon Yoo-jin – recording (track 4, 6), digital editing (track 4)
- Jeong Ho-jin – recording (track 6)
- Nam Goong-jin – mixing (track 1, 5)
- Lee Min-gyu – mixing (track 2)
- Jeong Yu-ra – mixing, engineered for mix (track 4)
- Kim Cheol-soon – mixing (track 6)
- Woo Min-jeong – digital editing (track 1, 5)
- Kwon Nam-woo – mastering (all tracks)

== Charts ==
=== Weekly charts ===
Weekly chart performance for Perfume
Chart (2023)	Peak position
Japanese Albums (Oricon)	5
Japanese Combined Albums (Oricon)	5
Japanese Hot Albums (Billboard Japan)	5
South Korean Albums (Circle)	2

=== Monthly charts ===
Monthly chart performance for Perfume
Chart (2023)	Peak position
Japanese Albums (Oricon)	13
South Korean Albums (Circle)	4

=== Year-end charts ===
Year-end chart performance for Perfume
Chart (2023)	Position
South Korean Albums (Circle)	38

== Sales and certifications ==
Sales and certifications for Perfume
Region	Certification	Certified units/sales
Japan	—	28,854
South Korea (KMCA)	2× Platinum	843,659
