= Doyoung =

South Korean singer (born 1996)

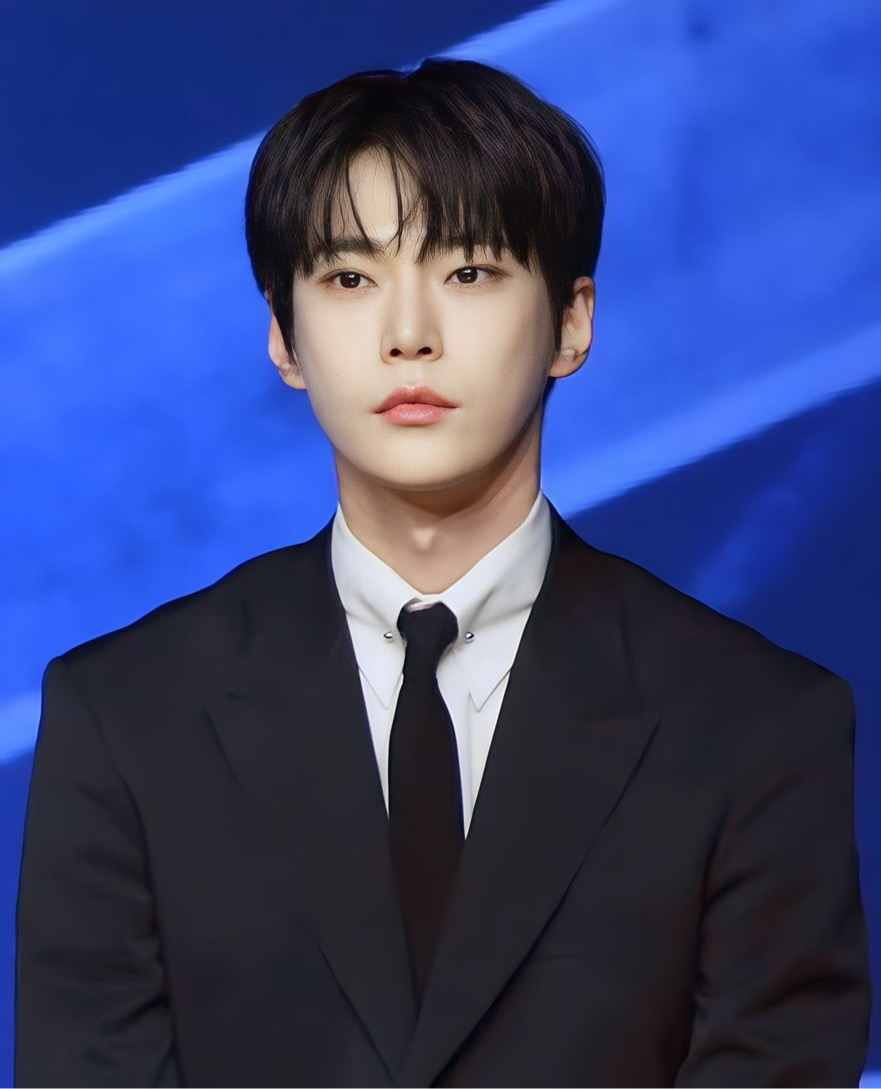
- Doyoung in October 2023
- Born: Kim Dong-young; February 1, 1996 (age 30); Guri, Gyeonggi, South Korea
- Education: Topyeong High School
- Occupations: Singer; actor; host
- Relatives: Gong Myung (brother)
- Musical career
- Genre: K-pop
- Instrument: Vocals
- Years active: 2015–present
- Label: SM
- Member of: NCT; NCT 127; NCT DoJaeJung; SM Town
- Formerly of: SM Rookies
- Website: Official website

Korean name
- Hangul: 김동영
- RR: Gim Dongyeong
- MR: Kim Tongyŏng

Stage name
- Hangul: 도영
- RR: Doyeong
- MR: Toyŏng

Kim Dong-young (Korean: 김동영; born February 1, 1996), known professionally as Doyoung (Korean: 도영), is a South Korean singer, actor, and host. He is a member of the South Korean boy band NCT through the sub-units NCT 127 and NCT DoJaeJung.

Doyoung was first introduced as a trainee through pre-debut team SM Rookies in January 2015. Doyoung was introduced as the first batch member of the boy band NCT and debuted through their rotational unit NCT U in April 2016. In January 2017, he was added as a new member of the Seoul-based sub-unit NCT 127. He later debuted in the trio sub-unit NCT DoJaeJung in April 2023. In April 2024, Doyoung began his solo debut with the release of his first studio album Youth.

Doyoung has ventured into acting. Following his supporting role in the third season of the drama series Midnight Cafe – The Curious Stalker and the musical Marie Antoinette in 2021, he starred in the web series Dear X Who Doesn't Love Me (2022). On television, Doyoung also appeared on the beauty show Lipstick Prince (2016–2017) and the variety show Law of the Jungle (2019) and hosted music show Show Champion (2015) and Inkigayo (2017–2018). He was previously a cast member of Master in the House from July 3, 2022, until the show's final air date of April 23, 2023.

== Early life ==
Kim Dong-young was born on February 1, 1996, in Guri, Gyeonggi, South Korea. He is the younger brother of actor Gong Myung.

== Career ==
=== 2013–2016: Pre-debut activities ===
In late 2013, Doyoung became a trainee at SM Entertainment after being scouted at the Guri City Youth Art Festival singing competition.

Doyoung took part in Exo member and labelmate Chanyeol's music video remake of H.O.T's song "Hope" alongside fellow trainees Johnny and Jaehyun on the television series Exo 90:2014, which aired on August 15, 2014. On January 15, 2015, Doyoung was introduced as a member of SM Rookies, a pre-debut team of trainees under SM Entertainment. He was also announced as a host of MBC Music's music show, Show Champion alongside fellow member Jaehyun. They hosted the program from January 21 to July 1, 2015.

Doyoung made a special appearance in episode 11 of the Korean remake of The Mickey Mouse Club, singing "Beauty & the Beast" as a duet with then-SM Rookies member Koeun, which aired on Disney Channel Korea on December 13, 2015. On February 15, 2016, he was selected as a model for the Design United brand along with Taeyong and Yuta.

=== 2016–2018: Debut with NCT and first solo activities ===
On April 5, 2016, Doyoung was confirmed as a member first sub-unit of boy group NCT, NCT U, alongside five other members of SM Rookies. They officially debuted with the digital singles "The 7th Sense" and "Without You", released on April 8 and 9, respectively. In July 2016, Doyoung collaborated with Shinee's Key on the song "Cool" for the soundtrack of OCN television series Squad 38. In November, Doyoung joined the cast of OnStyle's beauty variety show Lipstick Prince.

In December 2016, he was announced as a new member of NCT 127, the second sub-unit of NCT, which previously debuted in July. He officially debuted with the unit in January 2017 with the release of their EP Limitless. He also participated in the SM Station project "Sound of Your Heart" (너의 목소리) with fellow NCT member Taeil and labelmates Yesung, Sunny, Seulgi, Wendy, and Lee Dong-woo as part of SM Town.

In February 2017, he joined Inkigayo as a host alongside Got7's Jinyoung and Blackpink's Jisoo. In March of the same year, he appeared on the MBC program We Got Married alongside his brother.

In August, he released "Stay in My Life" for the soundtrack of School 2017 with fellow NCT members Taeil and Taeyong. In October, he collaborated with Gugudan's Kim Se-jeong to release "Star Blossom" (별빛 이 피면) through the second season of SM Station. In June 2018, he released a re-recording of "Hard for Me" for the television series Rich Man, the first song for the series originally performed by Cheeze.

=== 2019–2023: Further solo activities ===
In March 2019, Doyoung collaborated with indie duo Rocoberry on the song "Don't Say Goodbye (헤어 지지 말아요, 우리)". He appeared on the show King of Mask Singer under the name "Assistant Manager" in July 2019. He advanced to the final round based on his renditions of "Beautiful" by Crush and "Time Spent Walking Through Memories" by Nell, competing alongside the reigning champion, Nightingale. The following month, he was added to the regular cast of Law of the Jungle in Sunda Islands. In November, Doyoung collaborated with labelmates BoA, Siwon, J-Min, Sunny, Taemin, Suho and Wendy as part of SM Town on the song "This is Your Day (for every child, UNICEF)".

In September 2020, SM Entertainment announced that NCT would be releasing their second studio album as a group, NCT 2020 Resonance Pt. 1, with the second part NCT 2020 Resonance Pt. 2 following in November. On the first part of Resonance, Doyoung participated in both lead singles, "Make a Wish" and "From Home" by NCT U, the only member to do so. He also participated in the album tracks "Volcano" and "Lightbulb" by NCT U and "Music, Dance" by NCT 127. On the album's second part, Doyoung participated in the album track "I.O.U" along with other vocalists in the group.

In March 2021, Doyoung appeared in his first television drama as lead, the third season of Midnight Cafe – The Curious Stalker. On April 19, 2021, it was announced that Doyoung had been cast in his first musical, Marie Antoinette, as one of three actors playing the male lead role of Count Axel von Fersen. The musical ran from July 13 to October 3 at the Charlotte Theatre. On August 5, 2021, producer Ryan S. Jhun announced through his personal Instagram that Doyoung and fellow member Haechan would participate in the first single from his first album. The song, "Maniac", was released on August 12. On October 1, 2021, Doyoung released the soundtrack song "Like a Star" for the drama Yumi's Cells.

In April 2023, Doyoung debuted with the newest NCT sub-unit NCT DoJaeJung along with his groupmates Jaehyun and Jungwoo from NCT 127. A month later, he became the brand ambassador for the Italian fashion house Dolce & Gabbana in Korea and Japan. On May 23, 2023, Doyoung released the soundtrack song "Beautiful Day" for the third season of the television series Dr. Romantic. Doyoung also recorded "Here with Me", which was released on July 23, 2023, for the soundtrack of the television series See You in My 19th Life.

=== 2024–present: Solo debut with Youth ===
On April 4, 2024, SM announced that Doyoung will debut as a soloist with his first studio album Youth, slated to be released on April 22. On May 1, the album's title track "Little Light" won first place on the weekly music television program Show Champion. He held his first solo concert tour, titled Dear Youth, which started with a three-date concert in Seoul from May 25 to 27, holding a total of fifteen concerts in nine cities throughout 2024. A new single, "The Story", was released on November 6.

On April 18, 2025, SM announced that Doyoung will return as a soloist with his second album on June 9. Meanwhile, he will hold a 2-day concert in Seoul from June 14 to 15.

After the successful second comeback, "2025 DOYOUNG CONCERT [Doors]" was held in June to meet fans, and "2025 DOYOUNG ENCORE CONCERT [Yours]" was held at Inspire Arena in Yeongjong-do, Incheon for three days from October 9–11.

On November 12, Doyoung released the soundtrack for Exchange 4 titled "Still Here". On December 9, he released his first single album Promise, with the lead single of the same name.

== Personal life ==
=== Military service ===
In October 2025, it was announced that Doyoung will enlist for his mandatory military service on December 8 as an active duty soldier.

== Other ventures ==
=== Endorsements ===
In 2023, Dolce & Gabbana selected Doyoung as the Korea-Japan brand ambassador. In October, the brand announced him as its global ambassador. On December 25, McDonald's selected Doyoung as their model for "Lucky Burger" campaign.

=== Philanthropy ===
On March 8, 2022, Doyoung donated ₩30 million to the Hope Bridge Disaster Relief Association to help the victims of the massive wildfire that started in Uljin, Gyeongbuk and has spread to Samcheok, Gangwon.

On February 10, 2023, Doyoung donated ₩100 million to the Community Chest of Korea to help victims of the 2023 Turkey–Syria earthquake.

On February 7, 2025, Doyoung donated ₩30 million to the Ministry of Health and Welfare's Child Meal Support for undernourished children and teenagers.

In May 2026, Doyoung donated ₩100 million to the foundation to support South Korean military personnel at risk of suicide and children and adolescents who had lost family members to suicide.

== Discography ==
=== Studio albums ===
List of studio albums, with selected details, chart positions, sales figures, and certifications
Title	Details	Peak chart positions			Sales	Certifications
Title	Details	KOR	JPN	JPN Hot	Sales	Certifications
Youth	Released: April 22, 2024; Labels: SM, Kakao; Formats: CD, digital download, streaming	3	8	5	KOR: 384,145; JPN: 15,830	KMCA: Platinum
Soar	Released: June 9, 2025; Labels: SM, Kakao; Formats: CD, digital download, LP, streaming	3	13	—	KOR: 400,368; JPN: 6,780	KMCA: Platinum

=== Single albums ===
List of single albums, with selected details, chart positions, and sales figures
Title	Details	Peak chart positions	Sales
Title	Details	KOR	Sales
Promise	Released: December 9, 2025; Labels: SM, Kakao; Formats: CD, digital download, streaming	4	KOR: 45,363

=== Singles ===
==== As lead artist ====
List of singles as lead artist, showing year released, selected chart positions, and name of the album
Title	Year	Peak chart positions		Album
Title	Year	KOR	UK Sales	Album
"Star Blossom" (별빛 이 피면) (with Sejeong)	2017	— (Note: "Star Blossom" did not enter the Gaon Digital Chart, but peaked at number 74 on the Gaon Download Chart.)	—	SM Station Season 2
"Don't Say Goodbye" (헤어 지지 말아요, 우리) (with Rocoberry)	2019	184	—	Non-album single
"Doll" (인형) (with Baekhyun)	2021	129	—	Rewind: Blossom
"Fallin'" (with Kim Min-ha)	2022	— (Note: "Fallin" did not enter the Circle Digital Chart, but peaked at number 46 and 79 on the Circle Download Chart and Circle BGM Chart, respectively.)	—	Non-album single
"Little Light" (반딧불)	2024	5	46	Youth
"First Love" (첫사랑)	2024	— (Note: "First Love" did not enter the Circle Digital Chart, but peaked at number 10 and 79 on the Circle Download Chart and Circle BGM Chart, respectively.)	—	Non-album singles
"The Story" (시리도록 눈부신)	2024	110	—	Non-album singles
"Memory" (안녕, 우주)	2025	2	37	Soar
"Promise" (늦은 말)	2025	3	—	Promise
"—" denotes releases that did not chart or were not released in that region.

==== Promotional ====
List of promotional singles, showing year released, selected chart positions, and name of the album
Title	Year	Peak chart positions	Sales	Album
Title	Year	KOR	Sales	Album
"First Christmas" (with Joy)	2016	— (Note: "First Christmas" did not enter the Gaon Digital Chart, but peaked at number 80 on the Gaon Download Chart.)	KOR: 19,622	Inkigayo Music Crush Part 4
"17"	2024	158	—N/a	Non-album single
"—" denotes releases that did not chart or were not released in that region.

=== Soundtrack appearances ===
Title	Year	Peak chart positions			Album
Title	Year	KOR	KOR Down.	US World	Album
"Cool" (with Key)	2016	—	—	—	Squad 38 OST Part 2
"Hard for Me"	2018	—	—	—	Rich Man OST Part 5
"Night Air" (밤공기)	2021	—	79	—	Cafe Midnight OST Part 2
"Like a Star"	2021	—	59	—	Yumi's Cells OST Part 4
"A Little More" (아주 조금만 더)	2022	—	49	—	Soundtrack #1 OST
"To You Who Can't Love" (사랑할 수 없는 너에게)	2022	—	79	—	Dear X Who Doesn't Love Me OST Part 3
"Beautiful Day"	2023	—	44	—	Dr. Romantic 3 OST Part 3
"Here with Me"	2023	—	40	—	See You in My 19th Life OST Part 6
"Cry"	2024	—	—	—	On a Starry Night OST
"Snow Flower"	2024	—	—	—	I'm Sorry, I Love You 2024 OST
"Smile Again"	2024	—	61	—	Namib OST
"I Find You" (시간을 넘어 너에게로)	2025	175	—	10	Bon Appétit, Your Majesty OST
"Still Here"	2025	—	—	—	Exchange 4 OST
"What A Love"	2026	TBA			Boyfriend on Demand OST
"—" denotes releases that did not chart or were not released in that region.

=== Other charted songs ===
Title	Year	Peak chart positions	Album
Title	Year	KOR	Album
"Where You Are" (넌 어디에) (with Ryeowook, Onew, Chenle, and Xiaojun)	2023	— (Note: "Where You Are" did not enter the Circle Digital Chart, but it peaked at number 87 on the Circle Download Chart.)	2022 Winter SM Town: SMCU Palace
"Beginning" (새봄의 노래)	2024	101	Youth
"From Little Wave" (나의 바다에게)	2024	141	Youth
"Time Machine" (featuring Taeyeon and Mark)	2024	119	Youth
"Serenade" (내가 됐으면 해)	2024	179	Youth
"Rewind" (끝에서 다시)	2024	— (Note: "Rewind" did not enter the Circle Digital Chart, but it peaked at number 73 on the Circle Download Chart.)	Youth
"Warmth" (온기)	2024	— (Note: "Warmth" did not enter the Circle Digital Chart, but it peaked at number 74 on the Circle Download Chart.)	Youth
"Lost in California"	2024	— (Note: "Lost is California" did not enter the Circle Digital Chart, but it peaked at number 60 on the Circle Download Chart.)	Youth
"Rest" (쉼표)	2024	— (Note: "Rest" did not enter the Circle Digital Chart, but it peaked at number 59 on the Circle Download Chart.)	Youth
"Dallas Love Field"	2024	— (Note: "Dallas Love Field" did not enter the Circle Digital Chart, but it peaked at number 48 on the Circle Download Chart.)	Youth
"Be My Light" (쏟아져오는 바람처럼 눈부시게 너란 빛이 비추더라)	2025	154	Soar
"Wake from the Dark" (깊은 잠)	2025	— (Note: "Wake from the Dark" did not enter the Circle Digital Chart, but it peaked at number 45 on the Circle Download Chart.)	Soar
"Eternity" (미래에서 기다릴게)	2025	— (Note: "Eternity" did not enter the Circle Digital Chart, but it peaked at number 48 on the Circle Download Chart.)	Soar
"Sonnet" (소네트)	2025	— (Note: "Sonnet" did not enter the Circle Digital Chart, but it peaked at number 53 on the Circle Download Chart.)	Soar
"Sand Box"	2025	— (Note: "Sand Box" did not enter the Circle Digital Chart, but it peaked at number 57 on the Circle Download Chart.)	Soar
"Just Friends" (편한 사람)	2025	— (Note: "Just Friends" did not enter the Circle Digital Chart, but it peaked at number 62 on the Circle Download Chart.)	Soar
"Luminous" (동경)	2025	— (Note: "Luminous" did not enter the Circle Digital Chart, but it peaked at number 63 on the Circle Download Chart.)	Soar
"Still" (고요)	2025	— (Note: "Still" did not enter the Circle Digital Chart, but it peaked at number 66 on the Circle Download Chart.)	Soar
"First Step" (자전거)	2025	— (Note: "First Step" did not enter the Circle Digital Chart, but it peaked at number 67 on the Circle Download Chart.)	Soar
"Whistle" (featuring Belle)	2025	— (Note: "Whistle" did not enter the Circle Digital Chart, but it peaked at number 22 on the Circle Download Chart.)	Promise
"—" denotes releases that did not chart or were not released in that region.

=== Composition credits ===
List of songs, showing year released, artist name, and name of the album
Title	Year	Artist	Album	Lyricist	Composer
"Beginning"	2024	Doyoung	Youth	Yes	Yes
"From Little Wave"	2024	Doyoung	Youth	Yes	No
"The Story"	2024	Doyoung	—	No	Yes
"Promise"	2025	Doyoung	Promise	Yes	No

== Tours and concerts ==
=== 2024 Doyoung Concert [Dear Youth,] ===
Date	City	Country	Venue
May 25, 2024	Seoul	South Korea	Kyunghee University Grand Peace Palace
May 26, 2024	Seoul	South Korea	Kyunghee University Grand Peace Palace
May 27, 2024	Seoul	South Korea	Kyunghee University Grand Peace Palace
June 24, 2024	Yokohama	Japan	Pacifico Yokohama
June 25, 2024	Yokohama	Japan	Pacifico Yokohama
June 26, 2024	Osaka	Japan	Orix Theater
August 10, 2024	Nagoya	Japan	Nagoya Congress Center Century Hall
August 11, 2024	Nagoya	Japan	Nagoya Congress Center Century Hall
August 18, 2024	Hong Kong		AsiaWorld–Expo Runway 11
August 24, 2024	Bangkok	Thailand	UOB LIVE
August 25, 2024	Bangkok	Thailand	UOB LIVE
September 7, 2024	Tokyo	Japan	Tokyo Metropolitan Gymnasium
September 8, 2024	Tokyo	Japan	Tokyo Metropolitan Gymnasium
September 21, 2024	Jakarta	Indonesia	ICE BSD Hall 1
November 1, 2024	Seoul	South Korea	SK Olympic Handball Gymnasium
November 2, 2024	Seoul	South Korea	SK Olympic Handball Gymnasium
November 3, 2024	Seoul	South Korea	SK Olympic Handball Gymnasium

=== 2025 Doyoung Concert [Doors] ===
Date	City	Country	Venue
June 13, 2025	Seoul	South Korea	Jamsil Arena
June 14, 2025	Seoul	South Korea	Jamsil Arena
June 15, 2025	Seoul	South Korea	Jamsil Arena
July 12, 2025	Yokohama	Japan	Pia Arena MM
July 13, 2025	Yokohama	Japan	Pia Arena MM
July 16, 2025	Singapore		The Star Theatre
August 16, 2025	Macau	China	Studio City Event Center
August 17, 2025	Macau	China	Studio City Event Center
August 23, 2025	Kobe	Japan	Kobe World Hall
August 24, 2025	Kobe	Japan	Kobe World Hall
September 13, 2025	Bangkok	Thailand	Thunder Dome
September 14, 2025	Bangkok	Thailand	Thunder Dome
September 20, 2025	Taipei	Taiwan	Taipei Music Center
September 21, 2025	Taipei	Taiwan	Taipei Music Center
October 9, 2025	Incheon	South Korea	Inspire Arena
October 10, 2025	Incheon	South Korea	Inspire Arena
October 11, 2025	Incheon	South Korea	Inspire Arena

== Filmography ==
=== Television series ===
Year	Title	Role	Notes	Ref.
2016–2017	Lipstick Prince	Cast member	Season 1	
2019	King of Mask Singer	Contestant	Episodes 209–210	
2019	Law of the Jungle	Cast member	Episodes 388–392	
2021	Midnight Cafe – The Curious Stalker	Son Ji-woo	Season 3	
2022–2023	Master in the House	Cast member	Episodes 219–222, 227–254	

=== Web series ===
Year	Title	Role	Ref.
2022	Dear X Who Doesn't Love Me	Jeong Si-ho	

=== Radio ===
Year	Title	Role	Note	Ref.
2016	Kiss the Radio	Special DJ		
2017–2019	NCT's Night Night!	Special DJ	Saturday nights only	
2019	Idol Radio	Special DJ	with Johnny	

=== Hosting ===
Year	Title	Notes	Ref.
2015	Show Champion	with Jaehyun; January 21–July 1	
2016	M Countdown	July 28–September 22	
2016	M Super Concert	with Yeri; July 10	
2016	My SMT	with Leeteuk; September 19–October 24	
2017–2018	Inkigayo	with Jinyoung and Jisoo; February 5, 2017 – February 4, 2018	
2019	SMile Music Festival	with Johnny; October 25	
2020	Asia Song Festival	with Yeeun; October 10, 2020	
2022	11th Gaon Chart Music Awards	with Sieun and Jaejae; January 27, 2022	
2022	28th Dream Concert	with An Yu-jin; June 18, 2022	
2023	12th Circle Chart Music Awards	with Miyeon; February 18, 2023	
2024	SBS Gayo Daejeon Summer	with Yeonjun and An Yu-jin; July 21, 2024	

== Theater ==
Year	Title	Role	Ref.
2021	Marie Antoinette (마리 앙투아네트)	Count Axel von Fersen	
2025	The Man Who Laughs (웃는 남자)	Gwynplaine	

== Awards and nominations ==
Name of the award ceremony, year presented, category, nominee of the award, and the result of the nomination
Award ceremony	Year	Category	Nominee / Work	Result	Ref.
Asia Artist Awards	2021	Focus Award (Actor)	Doyoung	Won	
Asia Artist Awards	2021	AAA Japan Popularity Award – Actor (Male)	Doyoung	Nominated	
Asia Artist Awards	2021	U+IdolLive Popularity Award – Actor	Doyoung	Nominated	
Asia Artist Awards	2024	Best Choice – Music	Doyoung	Won	
Asia Web Awards	2021	Best Actor in a Comedy and Drama	Cafe Midnight Season 3 - The Curious Stalker	Won	
Brand Customer Loyalty Awards (Note: Established in 2016, the Brand Customer Loyalty Award is an awards ceremony that recognizes brands with high consumer loyalty in various fields.)	2023	Most Influential Male Variety Idol	Doyoung	Won	
die Seriale Digital Series Festival	2022	Best Actor	Cafe Midnight Season 3 - The Curious Stalker	Nominated	
Korea First Brand Awards (Note: The Korea First Brand Awards selected promising brands that are predicted to lead in every year based on criteria such as consumption trend analysis, extensive nationwide consumer surveys, and evaluation by experts.)	2023	Best Variety Idol	Doyoung	Won	
Korea First Brand Awards	2023	Best Male Idol Actor	Doyoung	Nominated	
Korea First Brand Awards	2026	Male Solo Singer	Doyoung	Won	
Marseille Webfest	2021	Best Music Award	"Night Air"	Won	
Seoul Music Awards	2025	Main Prize (Bonsang)	Doyoung	Won	
Seoul Music Awards	2025	Grand Prize (Daesang)	Doyoung	Nominated	
Seoul Music Awards	2025	Best Solo Award	Doyoung	Won	
Seoul Music Awards	2025	K-Wave Special Award	Doyoung	Nominated	
Seoul Music Awards	2025	K-pop World Choice – Solo	Doyoung	Nominated	
Seoul Music Awards	2025	Popularity Award	Doyoung	Nominated	
Seoul Webfest	2021	Best Actor	Cafe Midnight Season 3 - The Curious Stalker	Won	
