= NCT DoJaeJung =

South Korean boy band

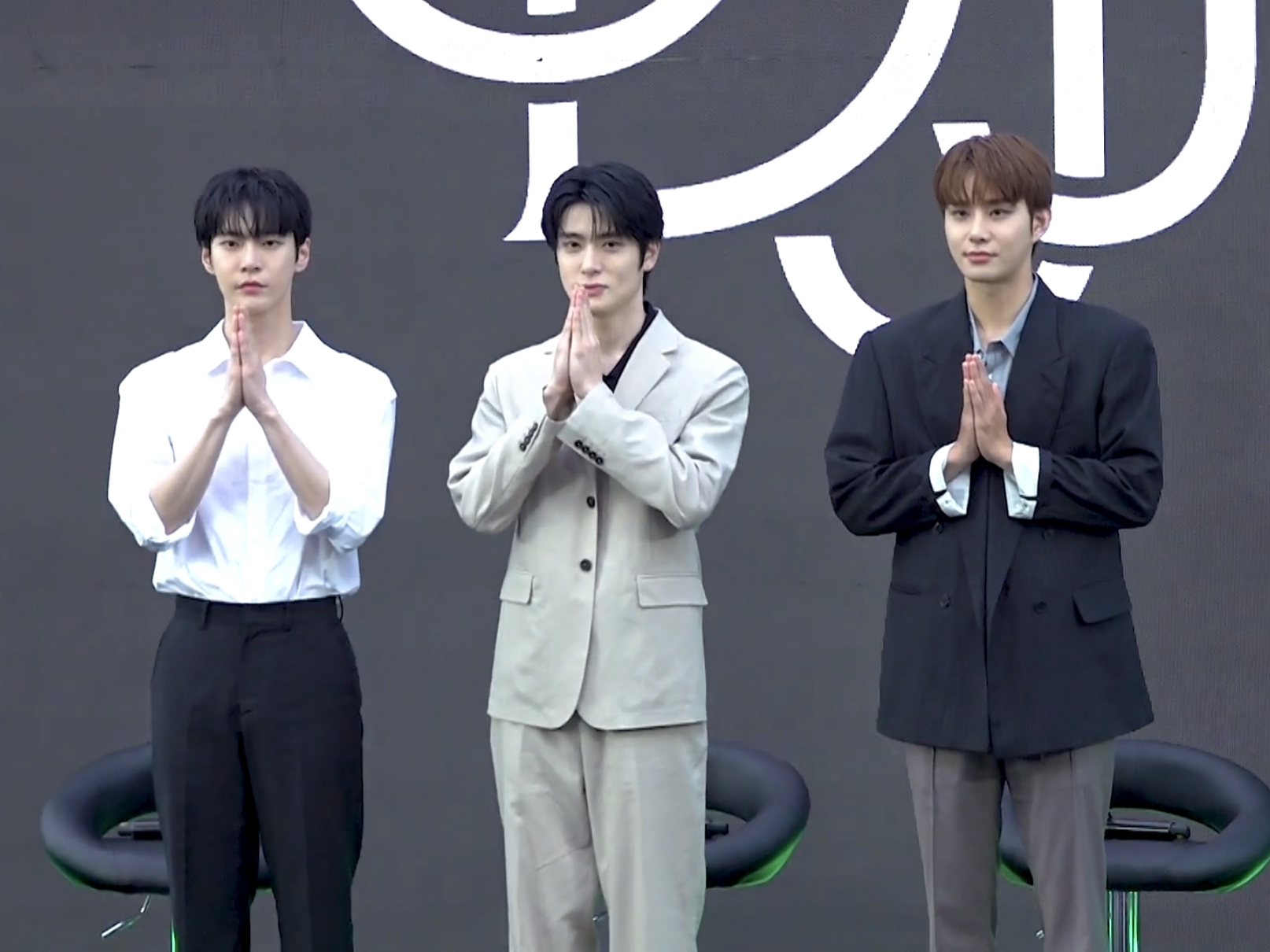
- NCT DoJaeJung in June 2023; L–R: Doyoung, Jaehyun, and Jungwoo

Background information
- Origin: Seoul, South Korea
- Genres: K-pop; R&B
- Years active: 2023
- Label: SM
- Spinoff of: NCT
- Members: Doyoung; Jaehyun; Jungwoo

NCT DoJaeJung (Korean: 엔시티 도재정; RR: Ensiti Dojaejeong; stylized in all caps) is the fifth sub-unit of the South Korean boy band NCT, formed and managed by SM Entertainment. The group consists of three members: Doyoung, Jaehyun, and Jungwoo. They debuted on April 17, 2023, with their extended play (EP) Perfume. They are recognized for their R&B music and all-vocal performance, which distinguish them from the other sub-units within NCT.

== Name ==
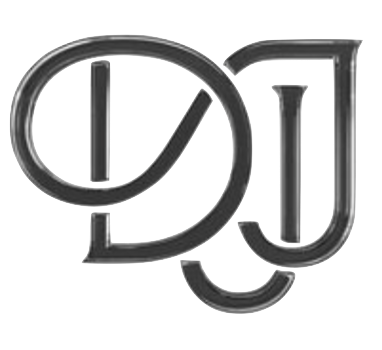
Official logo of the group

NCT DoJaeJung derive their name from that of their parent group, NCT (an acronym for Neo Culture Technology), and the three member's names—"Do" from Doyoung, "Jae" from Jaehyun and "Jung" from Jungwoo.

== History ==
=== 2022: Formation ===
NCT DoJaeJung was formed in early 2022, with the recording of their songs beginning in February 2022. They were introduced publicly as a sub-unit for the first time in October that year, performing the song "Can We Go Back" on NCT 127's Neo City – The Link+ concerts in Seoul. They also performed the song on 2022 MBC Gayo Daejejeon.

=== 2023–present: Debut with Perfume ===
In March 2023, SM Entertainment confirmed that NCT DoJaeJung would officially debut as a new unit of NCT. They released their debut extended play Perfume on April 17, alongside its lead single of the same name. The EP consists of six tracks: "Perfume", "Kiss", "Dive", "Strawberry Sunday", "Can We Go Back", and "Ordinary". The album became a commercial success both digitally and physically, selling 843,659 copies as of June 22, 2023, making it the best-selling debut album by an SM Entertainment act and the best-selling album by a K-pop sub-unit. The lead single, "Perfume", debuted at number four on the Circle Digital Chart, making NCT DoJaeJung the fastest NCT sub-unit to earn a top five single in South Korea. It also debuted at number one on the Circle Download Chart and Circle BGM Chart.

On May 4, NCT DoJaeJung performed at the fashion music festival Rakuten Girls Awards – Spring/Summer in Tokyo, Japan, which marked their first live performance in the country. On June 24, they held their first fan concert, titled Perfume: Scented Symphony, at the SM Mall of Asia Arena in Manila, Philippines. An accompanying media conference was held on June 25 at the Glorietta mall in Makati.

On July 21, NCT DoJaeJung headlined the 2023 Fandom Party at San Diego Comic-Con in San Diego, California, making it their first performance as a trio in the United States.

== Members ==
- Doyoung (도영)
- Jaehyun (재현)
- Jungwoo (정우)

== Discography ==
=== Extended plays ===
List of extended plays, showing selected details, selected chart positions, sales figures, and certification
Title	Details	Peak chart positions			Sales	Certifications
Title	Details	KOR	JPN	JPN Hot	Sales	Certifications
Perfume	Released: April 17, 2023; Label: SM Entertainment; Formats: CD, digital download, streaming	2	5	5	KOR: 806,642; JPN: 30,579	KMCA: 2× Platinum

=== Singles ===
List of singles, showing year released, selected chart positions, and album name
Title	Year	Peak chart positions	Album
Title	Year	KOR	Album
"Perfume"	2023	4	Perfume

=== Other charted songs ===
List of other charted songs, showing year released, selected chart positions, and album name
Title	Year	Peak chart positions	Album
Title	Year	KOR	Album
"Kiss"	2023	107	Perfume
"Dive"	2023	131	Perfume
"Strawberry Sunday"	2023	144	Perfume
"Can We Go Back" (후유증)	2023	110	Perfume
"Ordinary" (안녕)	2023	170	Perfume

== Concerts ==
=== Fan concert ===
NCT DoJaeJung's "Scented Symphony: Perfume" Fan Concert
Date	City	Country	Venue
June 24, 2023	Manila	Philippines	SM Mall of Asia Arena

== Awards and nominations ==
Name of the award ceremony, year presented, award category, nominee(s) of the award, and the result of the nomination
Award ceremony	Year	Category	Nominee(s)/work(s)	Result	Ref.
Seoul Music Awards	2024	Hallyu Special Award	NCT DoJaeJung	Nominated	
Seoul Music Awards	2024	Main Award (Bonsang)	NCT DoJaeJung	Nominated	
Seoul Music Awards	2024	Popularity Award	NCT DoJaeJung	Nominated	
