= Teen Top discography =

Discography

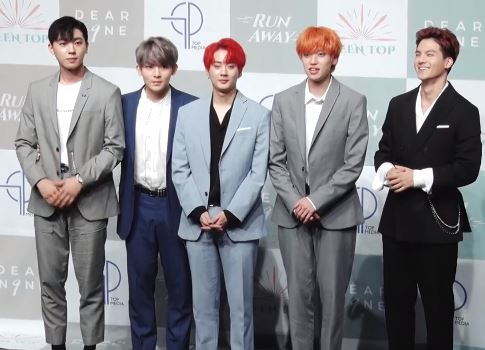
- Teen Top at the showcase for Dear N9ne
- Studio albums: 2
- Extended plays: 10
- Compilation albums: 1
- Singles: 22
- Music videos: 27
- Single albums: 4
- DVDs: 1

The discography of the South Korean boy group Teen Top consists of two studio albums, one compilation album, ten extended plays, three single albums, twenty-one singles. The group have been in the Korean music business since July 2010, debuting with their single, "Clap".

== Albums ==
=== Studio albums ===
List of studio albums, with selected details, chart positions, and sales
Title	Album details	Peak chart positions		Sales
Title	Album details	KOR	US World	Sales
No. 1	Released: February 25, 2013 (KOR); Re-released: April 25, 2013; Label: TOP Media; Formats: CD, digital download	2	9	KOR: 96,131; JPN: 8,341
High Five	Released: April 10, 2017 (KOR); Label: TOP Media; Formats: CD, digital download	1	—	KOR: 57,409; JPN: 11,806
"—" denotes releases that did not chart.

=== Compilation albums ===
List of compilation albums, with selected details, chart positions, and sales
Title	Album details	Peak chart positions
Title	Album details	JPN
Japan First Edition	Released: May 23, 2012 (JPN); Label: Universal D; Formats: CD, digital download, DVD; Track listing: CD; 1. "Transform"; 2. "Supa Luv"; 3. "Angel"; 4. "No More Perfume on You" (香水をつけないで); 5. "Beautiful Girl"; 6. "First Kiss"; 7. "The Back of My Hand Brushes Against" (手の甲がかすめる); 8. "Tell Me Why"; 9. "Supa Luv" [Inst.]; 10. "No More Perfume on You" (香水をつけないで) [Inst.]; DVD; 1. Supa Luv MV [Original & Dance Ver.]; 2. Angel MV [Sketch Ver.]; 3. 香水をつけないで (No More Perfume on You) MV [Original & Dance Ver.]; 4. 手の甲がかすめる (The Back of my Hand brushes against) [Sketch Ver.]; 5. Transform Jacket Making Film; 6. Roman MV Making Story; 7. 2012 Teen Top Calendar	19

=== Single albums ===
List of single albums, with selected details, chart positions, and sales
Title	Album details	Peak chart positions	Sales
Title	Album details	KOR	Sales
Come into the World	Released: July 9, 2010 (KOR); Label: TOP Media; Format: CD, digital download	16	KOR: 10,979
Transform	Released: January 12, 2011 (KOR); Label: TOP Media; Format: CD, digital download	6	KOR: 24,910
Summer Special 'Be Ma Girl'	Released: August 3, 2012 (KOR); Label: TOP Media; Format: CD, digital download	2	KOR: 46,719
Snow Kiss	Released: December 10, 2014 (KOR); Label: TOP Media; Format: CD, digital download	4	KOR: 8,207

== Extended plays ==
List of extended plays, with selected details, chart positions, and sales
Title	Details	Peak chart positions			Sales
Title	Details	KOR	JPN	US World	Sales
Roman	Released: July 26, 2011 (KOR); Label: TOP Media; Format: CD, digital download	2	—	—	KOR: 27,430
It's	Released: January 9, 2012 (KOR); Label: TOP Media; Format: CD, digital download	3	—	—	KOR: 67,299
Artist	Released: May 30, 2012 (KOR); Label: TOP Media; Format: CD, digital download	2	—	—	KOR: 49,568
Teen Top Class	Released: August 26, 2013 (KOR); Re-released: October 23, 2013 (Teen Top Class Addition); Label: TOP Media; Format: CD, digital download	1	—	7	KOR: 101,156; JPN: 3,411
Éxito	Released: September 15, 2014 (KOR); Re-released: November 10, 2014 (Teen Top 20s Love Two ÉXITO); Label: TOP Media; Format: CD, digital download	1	—	—	KOR: 91,947
Natural Born Teen Top	Released: June 22, 2015 (KOR); Label: TOP Media; Format: CD, digital download	1	—	13	KOR: 58,424; JPN: 21,504
Red Point	Released: January 18, 2016 (KOR); Label: TOP Media; Format: CD, digital download	1	18	12	KOR: 81,101; JPN: 26,853
Seoul Night	Released: May 8, 2018 (KOR); Re-released: July 3, 2018 (Teen Top Story: 8pisode); Label: TOP Media; Format: CD, digital download	1	—	—	KOR: 28,160
Dear. N9ne	Released: June 4, 2019 (KOR); Label: TOP Media; Format: CD, digital download	6	32	—	KOR: 16,137; JPN: 2,283 (Phy.)
4Sho	Released: July 4, 2023; Label: TOP Media; Format: CD, digital download	6	—	—	KOR: 28,388
Just 15, Just Teen Top	Released: August 21, 2025; Label: TOP Media; Format: CD, digital download	21	—	—	KOR: 22,111
"—" denotes releases that did not chart.

== Singles ==
List of singles, with selected chart positions, showing year released and album name
Title	Year	Peak chart positions			Sales (DL)	Album
Title	Year	KOR	KOR Hot	US World	Sales (DL)	Album
"Clap" (박수)	2010	69	—	—		Come into the World
"Supa Luv"	2011	40	—	—		Transform
"No More Perfume on You" (향수 뿌리지마)	2011	21	20	—	KOR: 929,962	Roman
"Going Crazy" (미치겠어)	2012	10	8	—	KOR: 1,929,638	It's
"To You"	2012	13	9	21	KOR: 1,115,436	Artist
"Be Ma Girl" (나랑 사귈래?)	2012	9	10	25	KOR: 690,737	Be Ma Girl Summer Special
"I Wanna Love" (사랑하고 싶어)	2013	28	18	—	KOR: 166,608	No. 1
"Miss Right" (긴 생머리 그녀)	2013	8	7	6	KOR: 788,044	No. 1
"Walk By..." (길을 걷다가...)	2013	41	28	—	KOR: 148,098	No. 1
"Rocking" (장난아냐)	2013	7	10	5	KOR: 404,835	Teen Top Class
"Lovefool" (못났다)	2013	40	52	—	KOR: 54,722	Teen Top Class
"Missing"	2014	8	—	14	KOR: 255,434	Éxito
"I'm Sorry" (우린 문제 없어)	2014	33	—	—	KOR: 45,821	Éxito
"Ah-Ah" (아침부터 아침까지)	2015	14	—	20	KOR: 173,502	Natural Born Teen Top
"Except for Me" (나만 빼고)	2015	—	—	—	KOR: 13,861	Non-album single
"Warning Sign" (사각지대)	2016	47	—	—	KOR: 44,281	Red Point
"Love Is" (재밌어?)	2017	91	—	—	KOR: 19,658	High Five
"Seoul Night" (서울밤)	2018	—	—	—	—N/a	Seoul Night
"Lover" (너와 나의 사이)	2018	—	—	—	—N/a	Teen Top Story: 8pisode
"Run Away"	2019	—	—	—	—N/a	Dear. N9ne
"To You 2020"	2020	—	87	—	—N/a	Non-album single
"Hweek" (휙)	2023	— (Note: "Hweek" did not enter the Circle Digital Chart, but peaked at number 27 on the component Download Chart.)	—	—	—N/a	4Sho
"Cherry Pie"	2025	— (Note: "Cherry Pie" did not enter the Circle Digital Chart, but peaked at number 77 on the component Download Chart.)	—	—	—N/a	Just 15, Just Teen Top
"—" denotes releases that did not chart.

=== Promotional singles ===
Title	Year	Peak chart positions	Album
Title	Year	KOR	Album
"Supa Luv A-Rex Remix"	2011	78	Non-album single

== Other charted songs ==
Title	Year	Peak chart positions		Album
Title	Year	KOR	KOR Hot	Album
"Don't I"	2013	72	92	Teen Top Class
"Date"	2013	113	—	Teen Top Class
"Oh! Good"	2013	134	—	Teen Top Class
"Rock Star" (featuring Maboos)	2013	153	—	Teen Top Class
"Teen Top Class"	2013	160	—	Teen Top Class
"—" denotes releases that did not chart.

== Videography ==
=== DVDs ===
Title	Album details	Track listing
aRtisT Special DVD	Release date: December 12, 2012; Format: 2DVD; Running time: 180 min.	Track listing Disc 1: 1. "To You" Main Teaser; 2. "To You" MV Full Version; 3. "To You" (Love is Pain); 4. "To You" (Love is Pure); 5. "To You" (Love is Fight); 6. "To You" MV Performance Version; 7. "To You" MV Making Film; Disc 2: 1. Self Camera Mission; 2. "To You" Dance Rehearsal; 3. Golden Bell; 4. "To You" Comeback Making; 5. On Air: 10 Special Clips

=== Music videos ===
Title	Year	Length	Notes
"Clap"	2010	3:29	Debut single, features After School's Lizzy
"Clap (Dance Version)"	2010	3:19	
"Supa Luv"	2011	3:35	Features Shinhwa's Eric Mun
"Supa Luv (Dance Version)"	2011	3:18	
"Supa Luv A-Rex Remix"	2011	3:19	OST soundtrack for the movie Beastly
"Angel"	2011	3:50	
"No More Perfume on You"	2011	3:32	Features Park Si-yeon
"No More Perfume on You (Dance Version)"	2011	3:32	
"Going Crazy (Full Version)"	2012	4:52	First #1 single, features 4Minute's So Hyun
"Going Crazy (Dance Version)"	2012	3:14	
"To You"	2012	3:50	Features Korea's Next Top Model, Cycle 2 finalist Song Hae-na
"To You (Performance Version)"	2012	3:08	
"Be Ma Girl"	2012	3:21	Features 100%
"Be Ma Girl (Performance Version)"	2012	3:18	
"I Wanna Love"	2013	3:32	Filmed in Hong Kong
"Miss Right"	2013	3:48	Features female comedian Shin Bora
"Miss Right (Dance Version)"	2013	3:19	
"Miss Right (Locker Room One Take Version)"	2013	3:22	
"Walk By..."	2013	3:19	
"Clap Encore"	2013	3:55	Special Teen Top 3rd Anniversary (July 10, 2013)
"Rocking"	2013	3:36	
"Rocking (Dance Version)"	2013	3:28	
"Date"	2013	3:09	
"Lovefool"	2013	4:05	
"Missing"	2014	4:05	Features model Lee Ho Jung
"Missing (Dance Version)"	2014	3:34	
"I'm Sorry"	2014	4:09	
"Snow Kiss"	2014	3:09	
"Ah-Ah"	2015	3:39	
"Ah-Ah (Free Version)"	2015	3:29	
"Warning Sign"	2016	3:46	
"Warning Sign (Dance Version)"	2016	3:19	
"Don't Drink"	2016	3:35	
"Apocalypse"	2016	2:33	
"Love Comes"	2016	3:19	
"Love Is"	2017	4:01	
"Love Is (Dance Version)"	2017	3:32	
"Seoul Night"	2018	3:15	
"Seoul Night (Dance Version)"	2018	3:14	
"Lover"	2018	3:24	
"Run Away"	2019	3:12	
"Run Away (Performance Version)"	2019	3:12	
"Hweek"	2023	3:23	
"Hweek (Performance Version)"	2023	3:22	
