= Juniel discography =

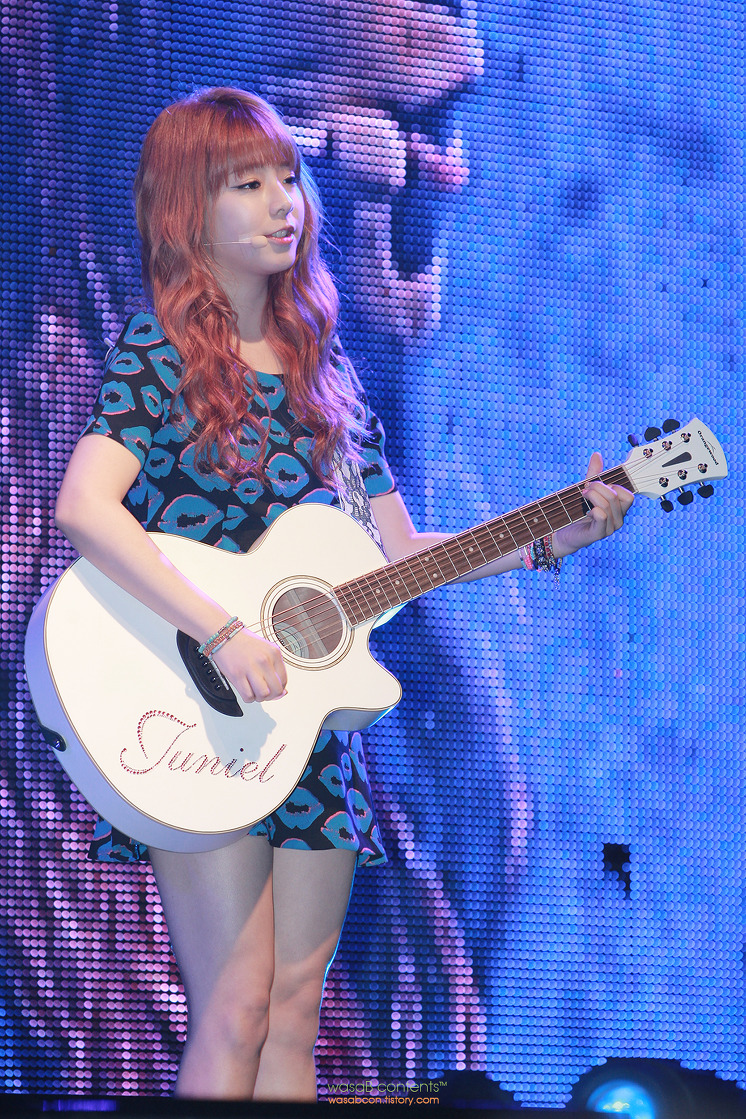
- Studio albums: 1
- Extended plays: 6
- Singles: 10
- Music videos: 10

The discography of South Korean solo-artist Juniel consists of one studio album, six extended plays, ten singles, and ten music videos.

Juniel made her debut in 2011 with the extended play Ready Go, which was released in Japan. She composed all the songs in the album and later took part in writing lyrics, as well as composing all her songs in subsequent Japanese releases. On March 6, 2013, Juniel released her first Japan major album titled Juni which consists of 11 self-composed songs and a Japanese version of duet song 'Babo' with CNBLUE's Jung Yong-hwa.

== Studio albums ==
| Title | Album details | Peak chart positions | | Sales |
| Title | Album details | JPN | KOR | Sales |
|---|---|---|---|---|
| Juni | Released: March 6, 2013 (JPN); Label: AI Entertainment, Warner Music Japan; Format: CD, digital download | 137 | 65 | JPN: 888 |

== Extended plays ==
| Title | Details | Peak chart positions | Sales |
| Title | Details | KOR | Sales |
|---|---|---|---|
| Ready Go | Released: April 29, 2011 (JPN); Label: AI Entertainment, JVC; Format: CD, digital download | — | |
| Dream & Hope | Released: July 12, 2011 (JPN); Label: AI Entertainment, JVC; Format: CD, digital download | — | |
| My First June | Released: June 7, 2012 (KOR); Label: FNC Entertainment, CJ E&M; Format: CD, digital download | 16 | KOR: 6,508 |
| 1&1 | Released: November 20, 2012 (KOR); Label: FNC Entertainment, CJ E&M; Format: CD, digital download | 4 | KOR: 4,186 |
| Fall in L | Released: April 25, 2013 (KOR); Label: FNC Entertainment, CJ E&M; Format: CD, digital download | 5 | KOR: 4,427 |
| Ordinary Things | Released: October 31, 2017 (KOR); Label: C9 Entertainment, Kakao M; Format: CD, digital download | 24 | KOR: 1,066 |
"—" denotes releases that did not chart.

== Singles ==
=== As lead artist ===
| Title | Year | Peak chart positions | | Sales | Album |
| Title | Year | KOR | KOR Hot | Sales | Album |
|---|---|---|---|---|---|
| "Forever" | 2011 | — | — | | Juni |
| "Sakura ~Todokanu Omoi~" | 2012 | — | — | | Juni |
| "Fool" (바보) (with Jung Yong-hwa of CNBLUE) | 2012 | 46 | 38 | | My First June |
| "Illa Illa" | 2012 | 8 | 8 | KOR: 2,070,345 | My First June |
| "Bad Man" (나쁜 사람) | 2012 | 4 | 4 | KOR: 1,288,175 | 1&1 |
| "Pretty Boy" (귀여운 남자) | 2013 | 12 | 7 | KOR: 611,368 | Fall in L |
| "Love You More Than Ever" (감동이 중요해) (feat. Hanhae of Phantom) | 2013 | 23 | 16 | KOR: 150,008 | Non-album singles |
| "Love Falls" (사랑이 내려) (with Lee Jonghyun of CNBLUE) | 2013 | 27 | — | KOR: 112,735 | Non-album singles |
| "The Next Day" (다음날) | 2014 | 18 | — | KOR: 130,813 | Non-album singles |
| "I Think I'm In Love" (연애하나 봐) | 2014 | 26 | — | KOR: 126,565 | Non-album singles |
| "Sorry" | 2015 | 50 | — | KOR: 77,297 | Non-album singles |
| "Pisces" (물고기자리) | 2016 | 68 | — | KOR: 38,622 | Non-album singles |
| "Last Carnival" | 2017 | — | — | | Ordinary Things |
| "I Drink Alone" (혼술) | 2017 | — | — | | Ordinary Things |
| "Zigzag" (삐뚤빼뚤) (feat. SangJae) | 2019 | — | — | | Non-album singles |
| "Dear." | 2022 | — | — | | Non-album singles |
| "Is This Love?" (이게 사랑인가 봐) | 2023 | — | — | | Non-album singles |
| "Three Things I Want to Give You" (너에게 주고 싶은 세 가지) | 2023 | — | — | | Non-album singles |
| "Tomorrow Will Be Beautiful" (내일이 아름답도록 (졸업식 노래)) | 2023 | — | — | | Non-album singles |
| "Flying" (비행) | 2024 | — | — | | Non-album singles |
| "Bye" (안녕) | 2024 | — | — | | Non-album singles |
"—" denotes releases that did not chart.

=== As featured artist ===
| Title | Year | Peak chart positions | Album |
| Title | Year | KOR | Album |
|---|---|---|---|
| "Spring Love" (Niel featuring Juniel) | 2015 | 40 | oNIELy |
| "Geu Hae Gyeoul (그 해 겨울)" (I'll featuring Juniel) | 2018 | — | Non-album singles |
| "Run Dawn" (새벽을 달려) (20 years of age featuring Juniel) | 2020 | — | Non-album singles |
"—" denotes releases that did not chart.

== Music videos ==
List of music videos, showing year released and director
| Title | Year | Director(s) |
|---|---|---|
| "Forever" | 2011 | Unknown |
| "Sakura ~Todokanu Omoi~" | 2012 | Unknown |
| "Fool" (with Jung Yong-hwa of CNBLUE) | 2012 | Unknown |
| "Illa Illa" | 2012 | Kim Eun-you |
| "Bad Man" | 2012 | Unknown |
| "Everything Is Alright" | 2013 | Unknown |
| "Pretty Boy" | 2013 | Unknown |
| "Love Falls" (with Lee Jonghyun of CNBLUE) | 2013 | Unknown |
| "I Think I'm In Love" | 2014 | Kim Eun-you |
| "Please" | 2014 | Unknown |
| "Sorry" | 2015 | Kim Eun |
| "Last Carnival" | 2017 | Unknown |
| "I Drink Alone" | 2017 | Unknown |
