= List of awards and nominations received by Teen Top =

Teen Top awards and nominations
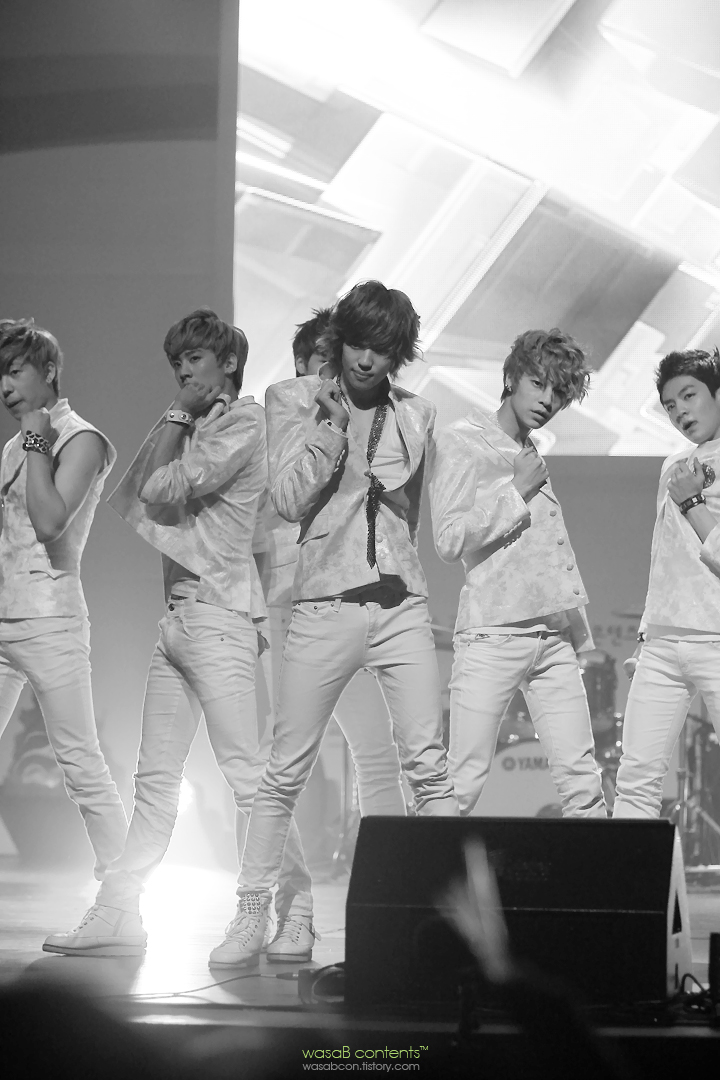
- Teen Top in KBS radio special program at 2011
Awards and nominations
Award	Wins	Nominations
After School Club Awards	0	1
Golden Disc Awards	1	5
KBS World TV	1	1
Melon Music Awards	0	1
Ministry of Culture and Korea Contents Association Awards	1	1
Mnet Asian Music Awards	0	4
Mnet M Countdown Awards	1	1
MTV Music Awards	2	2
OBS Idol Stars Awards	1	1
Republic of Korea Entertainment Arts Awards	2	2
SBS Inkigayo Awards	1	1
SBS MTV Best of the Best	0	1
Seoul Music Awards	0	7

Totals (Note: Certain award groups do not simply award one winner. They acknowledge several different recipients, have runners-up, and have third place. Since this is a specific recognition and is different from losing an award, runner-up mentions are considered wins in this award tally. For simplification and to avoid errors, each award in this list has been presumed to have had a prior nomination.)
- Wins: 10
- Nominations: 28

This is a list of awards and nominations received by Teen Top, a South Korean boy band formed in 2010 by TOP Media.

== Mnet Asian Music Awards ==
Year	Category	Recipient	Result	Ref
2010	Best New Male Artist	"Clap"	Nominated	
2013	Best Male Group	Teen Top	Nominated	
2013	Artist of the Year	Teen Top	Nominated	
2014	Best Music Video	"Missing"	Nominated	

== Seoul Music Awards ==
Year	Category	Recipient	Result	Ref
2011	Popularity Award	Teen Top	Nominated	
2012	Bonsang	Teen Top	Nominated	
2013	Bonsang	Rocking	Nominated	
2013	Popularity Award	Rocking	Nominated	
2015	Bonsang	("Missing")	Nominated	
2015	Popularity Award	Teen Top	Nominated	
2015	Hallyu Special Award	Teen Top	Nominated	

== Golden Disk Awards ==
Year	Category	Recipient	Result	Ref
2013	Single Album of the Year	It's	Won	
2013	MSN Southeast Asia Award	Teen Top	Nominated	
2014	Disk Bonsang	Rocking	Nominated	
2014	Popularity Award	Teen Top	Nominated	
2015	Disk Album Award	"Éxito"	Nominated	

== Melon Music Awards ==
Year	Category	Recipient	Result	Ref
2012	Bonsang	Teen Top	Nominated	

== Other awards and honors ==
Year	Award	Category	Recipient	Result
2010	Ministry of Culture and Korea Contents Association Awards	Rookie of the Month	Teen Top	Won
2010	SBS Inkigayo Awards	power Rookie (August)	Teen Top	Won
2010	MTV Music Awards	Best Rookie Group	Teen Top	Won
2011	18th Republic of Korea Entertainment Arts Awards	Rookie of the Year	Teen Top	Won
2011	18th Republic of Korea Entertainment Arts Awards	New generation of artists	Teen Top	Won
2011	MTV Music Awards	Best Male Group	Teen Top	Won
2011	OBS Idol Stars Awards	Idol Growth No.2.	Teen Top	Won
2011	Mnet M!Countdown Awards	Best Music Video	Supa Luv	Won
2012	SBS MTV Best of the Best	Best Video (Male)	Crazy	Nominated
2014	After School Club Awards	Fan Chant Award	Teen Top	Nominated
2015	KBS World TV	Top of the KOREAN IDOL	Teen Top	Honored
