= ONiely =

oNiely

EP by Niel
- Released: February 16, 2015
- Genre: K-pop, dance
- Length: 24:58
- Language: Korean
- Label: TOP Media

Singles from oNiely
- 1. "Lovekiller" Released: February 16, 2015; 2. "Spring Love" Released: April 14, 2015

Repackage cover

oNiely (stylized oNIELy) is the first EP of Niel under TOP Media, released on February 16, 2015. The album is Niel's debut as a solo artist after over 4 years with the South Korean boy group Teen Top. Of the album's seven tracks, only "Affogato" was written by Niel.

== Background ==
On January 5, 2015, it was announced that Niel would be making his official solo debut in February. January 27, on Mnet's "4 Things Show", Niel revealed a self-composed track "Affogato" from the EP. On February 1, TOP Media announced Niel would release an EP entitled oNiely on February 16. Niel collaborated with various artists for his EP, such as C.A.P, L.Joe, and Dok2. February 17 on the radio program, "Power FM's 'Choi Hwa Jung's Power Time," Niel said he had to go to the emergency room twice during preparations for the debut due to anxiety. On February 20 in the TV show "2TV morning" Niel's mother sent a video message stating "I found out from the news article that Niel had gone to the emergency room."

== Release and reception ==
On February 16, oNiely was released. oNiely reached number 1 on the weekly Hanteo Album Chart. It sold 17,205 copies on the first week. oNiely also topped the "Bugs album chart top 100" and Gaon album chart.

On April 14, Niel released oNiely repackage "Spring Love". The repackage album debuted at number 8 on Top 20 Best-Selling Albums on the Taiwan's weekly Five Music chart and peaked at number 4 on Hanteo Album Chart.

== Music video and single promotion ==
The official music video for the lead single "Lovekiller" came out on February 16 and features rapper Dok2. In the video, Korean model Yoo Seung-ok played the role of the "lovekiller". Much of the music video's inspiration came from Michael Jackson. Niel held the album's showcase performance at the Ilchi Art Hall in Cheongdam-dong, Gangnam-Gu, Seoul, on February 16, 2015. Televised promotions began on February 13, on KBS's Music Bank. He also promoted his album in various radio programs. On February 17, Teen Top SNS posted a video titled "Running machine live". In the video, Niel had been singing "Lovekiller" while jogging on the treadmill. The video impressed all the viewers with the high-speed movements while he kept singing. It showcased his abilities to perform perfectly, all while maintaining the choreography.

oNiely repackage Spring Love came out on April 14, 2015. The official music video for title track "Spring Love" was released on the same day, featuring female singer Juniel. The video was filmed in Hoxton Studio Pacific in Japan. Niel made his solo comeback with "Spring Love" feat. Juniel on Mnet's M! Countdown on April 16, 2015.

== Composition ==
The album includes the ballads "Call Me", "Epilogue", and "Song of an Angel"; the funk pieces "Affogato"; and the disco set "Lovekiller" in which he sings along to a steady acoustic guitar riff. The song "Lovekiller" was composed by Black Eyed Pilseung, who also wrote the melodies for Teen Top's "Missing" and "I'm sorry.""Lovekiller" is a medium-tempo dance song with an acoustic guitar sound. The song, "Affogato," which means "a gentle mix of sweet and bitter"- was self-produced by Niel. He first revealed the music video in Mnet's "4 Things Show".

== Track list ==
Credits adapted from official Teen Top page.

No.	Title	Lyrics	Music	Length
1.	"Only You"	Black Eyed Pilseung	Black Eyed Pilseung	3:03
2.	"Lovekiller (feat. Dok2)" (못된 여자)	Black Eyed Pilseung	Black Eyed Pilseung	3:29
3.	"아포가토 (feat. C.A.P)" (Affogato)	Niel	Niel	3:26
4.	"Lady (feat. L.Joe)"	Black Eyed Pilseung	Black Eyed Pilseung	3:31
5.	"전화해" (Call Me)	Ye-Yo	Ye-Yo	3:28
6.	"에필로그" (Epilogue)	Brand Newjiq	DJTY	3:27
7.	"천사의 노래" (Song of an Angel)	Lucid Fall	Lucid Fall	4:22
Total length:				24:58

Spring Love (Repackage Album)
No.	Title	Lyrics	Music	Length
1.	"심쿵 (Spring Love) (feat. Juniel)"	Park Chang-hyun （박창현）	Park Chang-hyun （박창현）	3:16
2.	"Memory... (feat. V-hawk)"	Niel	Niel	3:38
3.	"Only You"	Black Eyed Pilseung	Black Eyed Pilseung	3:03
4.	"Lovekiller (feat. Dok2)" (못된 여자)	Black Eyed Pilseung	Black Eyed Pilseung	3:29
5.	"아포가토 (feat. C.A.P)" (Affogato)	Niel	Niel	3:26
6.	"Lady (feat. L.Joe)"	Black Eyed Pilseung	Black Eyed Pilseung	3:31
7.	"전화해" (Call Me)	Ye-Yo	Ye-Yo	3:28
8.	"에필로그" (Epilogue)	Brand Newjiq	DJTY	3:37
9.	"천사의 노래" (Song of an Angel)	Lucid Fall	Lucid Fall	4:22
Total length:				31:52

== Charts ==
ONIELy

Country	Chart	Peak position
South Korea	Gaon Weekly album chart	1
South Korea	Gaon Monthly album chart	3

ONIELy Repackage `Spring Love`

Country	Chart	Peak position
South Korea	Gaon Weekly album chart	4
South Korea	Gaon Monthly album chart	9

== Release history ==
Album	Region	Date	Format	Label
oNiely	Korea	February 16, 2015	Digital download	TOP Media; LOEN Entertainment
oNiely	Korea	February 17, 2015	CD	TOP Media; LOEN Entertainment
Spring Love	Korea	April 14, 2015	CD, digital download	TOP Media; LOEN Entertainment
