= High Five (album) =

Studio album by Teen Top
- Released: April 10, 2017
- Recorded: 2017
- Genre: K-pop
- Length: 35:37
- Label: TOP Media
- Producer: Brave Brothers

Teen Top chronology
Red Point (2016)	High Five (2017)	Seoul Night (2018)

Singles from High Five
- 1. "Love is (재밌어?)" Released: April 10, 2017 (Promotional single)

High Five is the second studio album from South Korean boy band Teen Top. The title track "Love Is" was debuted on April 10, 2017, with the album released both digitally and physically the same day.

== Background ==
High Five marks the first album without L.Joe, who left Teen Top earlier that year due to contract controversies. The album was composed and written by Brave Brothers and Chakun, with contributions from Maboos, as well as members Changjo and Niel contributing their own songs.

== Track listing ==
No.	Title	Writer(s)	Length
1.	"Origin" (intro)	Brave Brothers; Chakun; Two Champ	0:37
2.	"재밌어? Love Is" (promotional single)	Brave Brothers; Chakun; Two Champ	3:28
3.	"손만 잡고 잘게 Because I Care"	Two Champ; Maboos	3:50
4.	"Call Me"	Brave Brothers; Chakun; Two Champ	3:08
5.	"I Love Girl"	Brave Brothers; Two Champ; JS	3:19
6.	"화나게 해 Make Me Sick"	JS; Maboos	2:52
7.	"7월의 만남 July"	Changjo; Dr. Kwon	3:56
8.	"안녕?! High Five"	Denis Seo; Niel; Shin Seung Eui	3:37
9.	"뭐가 문제야 What’s Problem"	Changjo; Dr. Kwon	3:36
10.	"You & I"	OllePolle	3:18
11.	"Mirror"	Denis Seo; Niel; Shin Seung Eui	3:54
Total length:			35:37
