= Changjo =

South Korean singer and actor

- 최종현
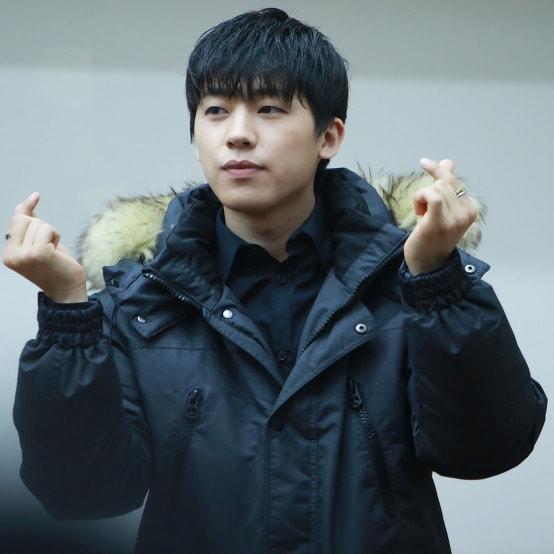
- Changjo in December 2015
- Born: Choi Jong-hyun; November 16, 1995 (age 30); Chuncheon-si, Gangwon, South Korea
- Other name: Changjo
- Occupations: Singer; songwriter; actor
- Musical career
- Genres: K-pop; R&B
- Instrument: Vocals
- Years active: 2010–present
- Labels: TOP Media; Beat Interactive
- Member of: Teen Top

- Korean name
- Hangul: 최종현
- Hanja: 崔鐘顯
- RR: Choe Jonghyeon
- MR: Ch'oe Chonghyŏn

Stage name
- Hangul: 창조
- RR: Changjo
- MR: Ch'angjo

Choi Jong-hyun (Korean: 최종현; born November 16, 1995), known professionally as Changjo (창조), is a South Korean singer, songwriter and actor. He is best known as a member of the South Korean boy group Teen Top.

== Career ==
On July 10, 2010, Changjo made his debut as a member of Teen Top with their debut album Come into the World on MBC's Show! Music Core with the title track of the album "Clap". As of their debut, Teen Top has released one studio album, seven EPs and four single albums.

On December 28, 2021, Changjo announced that he will not renew his contract with TOP Media starting from January 10, 2022. However, he will still remain as a member of Teen Top.

On June 7, 2023, it was announced Changjo signed an exclusive contract with Beat Interactive as soloist and actor.

== Discography ==
=== Singles ===
Title	Year	Peak chart positions	Album
Title	Year	KOR	Album
As lead artist
"Never Anything" (기다려) (feat. V-Hawk)	2019	—	Non-album singles
"Hurting U"	2021	—	Non-album singles
"Stuck On U" (feat. 24Flakko)	2022	—	Non-album singles
"DECRESCENDO"	2022	—	Non-album singles
"BEAUTIFUL"	2022	—	Non-album singles
"DANGER"	2022	—	COLOR PROJECT PART.2
"Trapped In My Head"	2025	—	Non-album singles
"Stay Down"	2025	—	Non-album singles
"All In My Zone"	2025	—	Non-album singles
As collaboration artist
"Suddenly" (with Niel & Hwanhee)	2021	—	TOP VOICE
OSTs
"I Believe" (with Eunjung)	2023	—	Music In The Trip OST
"Starry Night" (안녕)	2023	—	Music In The Trip OST
"*" denotes charts which did not exist at the time of release.

== Filmography ==
=== Film ===
Year	Title	Role	Notes
2015	Mak Girls	Choi Kang-ho	Lead role

=== Television ===
Year	Title	Role	Notes
2014–2015	Sweden Laundry	Yong Soo-chul	Main role
2017	My Brother Disappeared	Kong Jung-ki	Main role
2017	Criminal Minds	Worker	Cameo (1 episode)
