= Roman (EP) =

EP by Teen Top
- Released: July 26, 2011
- Recorded: 2011
- Genre: K-pop, dance
- Length: 22:01
- Label: TOP Media

Teen Top chronology
Transform (2011)	Roman (2011)	It's (2012)

Singles from Roman
- 1. "No More Perfume on You" Released: July 26, 2011 (Promotional single)

"Roman" is the first mini album by the South Korean boy band Teen Top. It was released on July 26, 2011 with the song "No More Perfume on You" as the title track.

== History ==
Teen Top worked with producer Bang Si-hyuk and composer Park Chang-hyeon (whose hits include TVXQ's Hug and Fly to the Sky's Missing You) to create a musically diverse mini-album. The album's title song, "No More Perfume on You", which was used for promotions, is a stylish dance number that stands out for its sophisticated melody and harmonization.

== Track listing ==
Official tracklist
No.	Title	Length
1.	"향수뿌리 지마" (No More Perfume On You; Hyangsu Ppurijima)	3:31
2.	"Beautiful Girl"	3:52
3.	"First Kiss"	3:37
4.	"손등이 스친다" (The Back of My Hand Brushes Against; Sondeungi Seuchinda)	4:11
5.	"Tell Me Why"	3:24
6.	"향수뿌리 지마" (No More Perfume On You; Hyangsu Ppurijima (Instrumental))	3:31
Total length:		22:01

== Charts ==
=== Album chart ===
Chart	Peak position
Gaon Weekly album chart	2
Gaon Monthly album chart	11
Gaon Monthly album chart	82

=== Single chart ===
Song	Peak position
Song	Gaon Chart
"No More Perfume on You"	21

=== Sales and certifications ===
Chart	Amount
Gaon physical sales	19,231 (2011); 4,704 (2012); 3,495 (2013)
