= Summer Special 'Be Ma Girl' =

Single album by Teen Top
- Released: August 3, 2012
- Recorded: 2012
- Genre: K-pop
- Length: 11:02
- Label: TOP Media
- Producer: Brave Brothers

Teen Top chronology
| Artist (2012) | Summer Special 'Be Ma Girl' (2012) | No. 1 (2013) |

Singles from Summer Special 'Be Ma Girl'
- 1. "Be Ma Girl" Released: August 3, 2012

Summer Special 'Be Ma Girl' is the third single album by the South Korean boy group Teen Top. It is also the third music project with South Korean music producer, Brave Brothers. The album was released both digitally and physically on August 3, 2012. 나랑 사귈래? (Be Ma Girl) was used as the promotional track for the album.

== Track listing ==
All music is composed by Brave Brothers.

| No. | Title | Length |
|---|---|---|
| 1. | "Fall in Love" (반해) | 1:26 |
| 2. | "Be Ma Girl" (나랑 사귈래?) | 3:19 |
| 3. | "Party Tonight" | 3:01 |
| 4. | "Be Ma Girl" (나랑 사귈래?) (Inst.) | 3:19 |
| Total length: | | 11:02 |

== Charts ==
=== Album chart ===
| Title | Peak position | Sales |
| Title | KOR | |
|---|---|---|
| Summer Special 'Be Ma Girl' | 2 | 44,496 (2012); 1,818 (2013) |

=== Single chart ===
| Title | Peak positions | |
| Title | KOR | Billboard K-Pop |
|---|---|---|
| "Be Ma Girl" (나랑 사귈래?) | 9 | 10 |
