= Red Point (EP) =

EP by Teen Top
- Released: January 18, 2016
- Genre: K-Pop
- Label: TOP Media

Teen Top chronology
Natural Born Teen Top (2015)	Red Point (2016)	High Five (2017)

Red Point is the seventh EP recorded and performed by the South Korean idol group Teen Top. It was released on January 18, 2016 with "Warning Sign" serving as the album's title track. The album was released in two versions, 'Chic' and 'Urban' and contains six tracks in total. It was the last album to feature L.Joe before his departure on February 10, 2017.

== Track listing ==
No.	Title	Lyrics	Music	Length
1.	"Warning Sign (사각지대)"	Mafly, C.A.P, L.Joe	Hyuk Shin, MRey, Davey Nate, DK	3:14
2.	"Please, Don't Go (가지마)"	김원, C.A.P, L.Joe	김원	3:48
3.	"Day"	C.A.P, L.Joe, 창조(Changjo), 허성진	허성진, 창조(Changjo)	3:42
4.	"Liar"	C.A.P, 니엘(NIEL), Denis Seo, 신승익	Denis Seo, 니엘(NIEL), 신승익	3:57
5.	"Day After Day (기다리죠)"	L.Joe, C.A.P	이오일(251), L.Joe, 종환	3:14
6.	"Don't Drink (술 마시지마)"	OllePolle, 박순철	OllePolle, 박순철	3:33
Total length:				21:28

== Charts ==
Chart (2016)	Peak position
South Korean Albums (Gaon)	1
Japanese Albums (Oricon)	18
US World Album (Billboard)	12
