= Éxito (EP) =

ÉXITO

EP by TEEN TOP
- Released: September 15, 2014; November 11, 2014（20's LOVE TWO ÉXITO
- Recorded: 2014
- Genre: Korean pop music
- Length: 21:26; 29:03（20's LOVE TWO ÉXITO）
- Labels: TOP Media production LOEN Entertainment release

TEEN TOP chronology
Teen Top Class (2013)	ÉXITO (2014)

Singles from ÉXITO
- 1. "Missing（쉽지않아）" Released: September 15, 2014; 2. "I'm Sorry（우린 문제없어）" Released: November 10, 2014

Éxito is a 2014 Korean-language EP by South Korean boy band Teen Top. The title song is "Missing" (Korean: 쉽지 않아), followed by release repackaged version of the album in the same year on November 10 "20's LOVE TWO ÉXITO", the title song was "I'm Sorry" (Korean: 우린 문제 없어).

== Release ==
The song "Missing" was released on September 14, 2014 together with the remaining songs of the album. It is described by TOP Media as "an emotional dance song with a groovy R&B rhythm that highlights the soulful vocals of Teen Top". Teen Top began promoting the single on September 11 on M! Countdown. They followed that will subsequent stages on the various music programs including Mnet's MBC Music's Show Champion, KBS's Music Bank, MBC's Show! Music Core and SBS's Inkigayo.

== Tracks ==
No.	Title	Lyrics	Music	Arrangement	Length
1.	"Missing" (쉽지않아)	Black Eyed Pilseung; The Platonix	Black Eyed Pilseung; The Platonix	Black Eyed Pilseung	3:20
2.	"Alone?" (혼자 사니?)	Black Eyed Pilseung; The Platonix	Black Eyed Pilseung	Black Eyed Pilseung	3:29
3.	"Cry" (울어)	The Platonix; C.A.P; L.Joe	Black Eyed Pilseung	Black Eyed Pilseung	3:26
4.	"Love Is..." (지독하다)	The Platonix	The Platonix	The Platonix	3:38
5.	"Remote Control" (리모콘)	Entire army	Entire army (전군); Tricky	Entire army Tricky	3:56
6.	"Love U"	L.Joe	L.Joe	L.Joe; John uncertainty (명랑한); Sports ministry (운동부)	3:27
Total length:					21:26

Repackaged version of the album
No.	Title	Lyrics	Music	Arrangement	Length
1.	"I'm Sorry" (우린 문제없어)	Black Eyed Pilseung; C.A.P; L.Joe	Black Eyed Pilseung	Black Eyed Pilseung	3:47
2.	"No" (아니야)	C.A.P	C.A.P; Tarsus (큰민수)	Zhang Zhiyuan (장지원); Monday Band (먼데이밴드)	3:50
3.	"Missing" (쉽지않아)				3:20
4.	"Alone?" (혼자 사니?)				3:29
5.	"Cry" (울어)				3:26
6.	"Love Is..." (지독하다)				3:38
7.	"Remote Control" (리모콘)				3:56
8.	"Love U"				3:27
Total length:					29:03

== Achievement list ==
=== Gaon Chart ===
Area	residence time list	Type	Residence time	Highest position	references
Korea	Gaon Singles Chart	2014 Gaon Singles chart	September 14, 2014 September 20	#8	
Korea	Gaon Singles Chart	2014 Gaon singles chart	September 2014	#38	
Korea	Gaon album chart	2014 Album weekly chart	September 21, 2014 September 27 （《ÉXITO》）	#1	
Korea	Gaon album chart	2014 Album weekly chart	November 9, 2014 - November 15 （《20's LOVE TWO ÉXITO》）	#2	
Korea	Gaon album chart	2014 Album monthly chart	September 2014 （《ÉXITO》）	#3 （67,171）	
Korea	Gaon album chart	2014 Album monthly chart	November 2014 （《20's LOVE TWO ÉXITO》）	#6 （19,318）	
Korea	Gaon album chart	Gaon Yearly album chart	2014 （《ÉXITO》）	#29 （70,823）	
Korea	Gaon album chart	Gaon Yearly album chart	2014 （《20's LOVE TWO ÉXITO》）	#85 （18,593）	

=== Other songs accomplishments ===
Area	Residence time list	Type	Residence time	Highest position	references
I'm Sorry	Gaon Singles Chart	Singles weekly chart	2014 November 9 - November 15	33#	
Missing	Gaon Singles Chart	Singles weekly chart		8#	
Missing	Gaon Singles Chart	Social Chart		4#	

"Missing"
Chart	Number
Gaon downloads chart	92,878

"Missing"
Network	TV program	Date	Other nominees
MBC Music	Show Champion	September 24	Various
KBS	Music Bank	September 26 [6,725 points]	2PM

== Release history ==
Album	Region	Date	Format	Label
ÉXITO	Korea	September 15, 2014	CD、Digital Download	TOP Media; LOEN Entertainment
20's LOVE TWO ÉXITO	Korea	November 10, 2014	Digital download	TOP Media; LOEN Entertainment
20's LOVE TWO ÉXITO	Korea	November 11, 2014	CD	TOP Media; LOEN Entertainment
