= Artist (EP) =

EP by Teen Top
- Released: May 30, 2012 (online); June 4, 2012 (offline)
- Recorded: 2012
- Genre: K-pop, dance
- Label: TOP Media
- Producer: Brave Brothers

Teen Top chronology
It's (2012)	Artist (2012)	Summer Special 'Be Ma Girl' (2012)

Singles from aRtisT
- 1. "To You" Released: May 30, 2012 (Promotional single)

Artist is the third EP by the South Korean boy group Teen Top, released digitally on May 30, 2012 and physically on June 4, 2012 under the label of TOP Media. The lead single from the album is "To You".

== Production ==
The EP was once again produced by Brave Brothers who also produced the group's previous work, It's early in the year.

== Track listing ==
Official track list
No.	Title	Length
1.	"Artist" (Intro)	0:55
2.	"To You"	3:06
3.	"Baby U"	3:28
4.	"흔들어놔!" (Shake It!)	3:15
5.	"To You" (Slow B. version [Remix])	3:08
6.	"To You" (Instrumental)	3:06

== Chart performance ==
=== Charts ===
==== Album chart ====
Chart	Peak position
Gaon Weekly album chart	2
Gaon Monthly album chart	3
Gaon Yearly album chart	36

==== Single chart ====
Song	Peak chart position	
Song	KOR	KOR
Song	Gaon Chart	K-Pop Billboard
"To You"	13	9

=== Sales and certifications ===
Chart	Amount
Gaon physical sales	45,979 (2012); 3,589 (2013)
