= No. 1 (Teen Top album) =

Studio album by Teen Top
- Released: February 25, 2013 (Limited Edition); February 28, 2013 (Normal Edition)
- Recorded: 2013
- Genre: K-pop
- Length: 37:50
- Label: TOP Media; LOEN Entertainment
- Producer: Brave Brothers

Teen Top chronology
Summer Special 'Be Ma Girl' (2012)	No. 1 (2013)	Teen Top Class (2013)

Singles from No. 1
- 1. "사랑하고 싶어 (I wanna love)" Released: February 15, 2013 (Pre-released single); 2. "긴 생머리 그녀 (Miss Right)" Released: February 25, 2013 (Promotional single)

No. 1 is the first studio album by the South Korean boy group Teen Top. The track "사랑하고 샆어 (I wanna love)" was released on February 15, 2013, as a pre-release track. The full album was released both digitally and physically on February 25, 2013 using "긴 생머리 그녀 (Miss Right)" as the promotional track.

A repackaged edition titled No.1 Repackage Special Edition was released to thank fans for their support.

== Background ==
Teen Top's leader, C.A.P, contributed in writing lyrics for the song "Mr.Bang", along with Maboos and Chakun of Electroboyz.

== Track listing ==
No.	Title	Lyrics	Music	Length
1.	"No. 1" (intro)	Brave Brothers, Maboos	Brave Brothers	1:04
2.	"긴 생머리 그녀 (Miss Right)" (lit. 'Girl with long straight hair')	Brave Brothers	Brave Brothers, 코끼리왕국	3:18
3.	"니가 아니라서 (Missing You)"	별들의 전쟁, 마부스(Maboos)	별들의 전쟁	3:51
4.	"사랑하고 싶어 (I Wanna Love)"	용감한 형제	용감한 형제, 별들의 전쟁	3:13
5.	"Stop Girl"	마부스(Maboos), 차쿤	코끼리왕국, 마부스(Maboos)	3:06
6.	"왜 (Why)"	Brave Brothers	Brave Brothers	3:15
7.	"Hello"	용감한 형제, 차쿤	Brave Brothers, 별들의 전쟁	3:25
8.	"Never Go Back"	마부스(Maboos), 차쿤	별들의 전쟁, 마부스(Maboos)	3:24
9.	"너 땜에 못살아 (Mad at U)" (lit. 'I can't live because of you')	Brave Brothers	Brave Brothers, 차쿤	3:42
10.	"달콤해 (So Sweet)"	용감한 형제, 차쿤, 마부스(Maboos)	용감한 형제, 차쿤, 마부스(Maboos)	3:07
11.	"Get Crazy"	용감한 형제	용감한 형제, 코끼리왕국	3:30
12.	"Mr. Bang (feat. Maboos, 차쿤)"	마부스(Maboos), 차쿤, C.A.P	용감한 형제	3:04
Total length:				37:50

=== No.1 [Repackage Special Edition] ===
No.	Title	Length
1.	"길을 걷다가… (Walk By…)"	3:07
2.	"배아파 (Jealousy)"	3:05
3.	"긴 생머리 그녀 (Miss Right)" (lit. 'Girl with long straight hair')	3:18
4.	"니가 아니라서 (Missing You)" (lit. 'Because it's not you')	3:51
5.	"사랑하고 싶어 (I Wanna Love)"	3:13
6.	"Stop Girl"	3:06
7.	"왜 (Why)"	3:15
8.	"Hello"	3:25
9.	"Never Go Back"	3:24
10.	"너 땜에 못살아 (Mad at U)" (lit. 'I can't live because of you')	3:42
11.	"달콤해 (So Sweet)"	3:07
12.	"Get Crazy"	3:30
13.	"Mr. Bang (feat. Maboos, 차쿤)"	3:04
14.	"No. 1"	1:03
Total length:		43:62

== Chart performance ==
The Limited Edition of No. 1 sold out within 2 days of its release through pre-orders online and offline.

=== Single chart ===
Title	Peak positions	
Title	KOR	Billboard KOR
"사랑하고 싶어 (I Wanna Love)"	28	18
"긴 생머리 그녀 (Miss Right)"	8	7
"니가 아니라서 (Missing You)"	64	

=== Album chart ===
Title	Peak position	Sales
Title	KOR	
No. 1	2	81,956
No. 1 Special Repackage Album	4	15,184
