= Universal D =

- Parent company: Universal Music Group
- Distributor: Universal Music Japan
- Genre: various
- Country of origin: Japan
- Location: Akasaka and Aoyama
- Official website: universal-music.co.jp/universal-d/

Universal D is a record label division under the Universal Music Group in Japan.

== Artists and projects ==
- Ahn Jae-wook
- Aira Mitsuki
- Allen Kim
- alpaca
- Ayumi Shibata
- Bananaman
- BIRTH
- Brand new vibe
- Boys Republic
- CNBLUE (distribution only)
- cossami
- Daijiman Brothers Band
- Dragon Zakura OST
- Epaksa
- F.Cuz
- Fingazz
- freeTEMPO
- FUJI
- Gacharic Spin
- GoTouchi Idol
- THE GOLDEN WET FINGERS
- Hallelujah Sisters
- Happy Sugar Generation
- Hyun Bin
- ICTlovely
- INFINITE
- ISLAND POP
- jammin' Zeb
- Jang Keun-suk
- Ju Ji-hoon
- K-pop Dream Concert
- Kenichi Asai
- Kim Dong-wan
- Kishi Bashi
- Kouji Ikuma
- Kus Kus
- LEDApple
- Lee Joon-gi
- Lee Min-ho
- Lee Min-ki
- LIL' $
- Linda3
- LIONOTE
- Masayoshi Oishi
- Matsumoto Nanami
- Megumi Makino
- Motoharu Sano
- Party Rockets
- Saori@destiny
- Secret
- SECRET 7 LINE
- Seiko Shiga
- Seo Ji-seok
- SHERBERTS
- Shiina Yoshiharu
- Shin Hye-sung
- Teen Top
- Tokyo Cheer2 Party
- Tomato n'Pine
- VIBELUCK
- The Yellow Monkey (disbanded)
- Yoon Sang-hyun
- ZE:A

== Distributed labels ==
- Hybe Labels Japan
- Yoshimoto Music Entertainment

== See also ==
- List of record labels
