= Natural Born Teen Top =

Natural Born

EP by Teen Top
- Released: June 22, 2015
- Genre: dance
- Length: 19:41
- Language: Korean
- Labels: TOP Media, LOEN Entertainment

Teen Top chronology
| Snow Kiss (2014) | Natural Born (2015) | Red Point (2016) |

Singles from Ah-Ah
- 1. "Ah-Ah" Released: June 22, 2015

Natural Born Teen Top is the sixth EP recorded and performed by the South Korean idol group Teen Top. It was released digitally on June 22, 2015 and physically on June 23. The album was released in two versions and contains six tracks.

== Background and release ==
On June 9, 2015, TOP Media announced that Teen Top will release a new mini album titled "Natural Born" on June 22. TOP Media also revealed Teen Top's first music show performance with new title track "Ah-Ah" is scheduled for June 25 on the stage of M! Countdown. On June 18, a preview video from the EP was uploaded to YouTube. The official music video for the EP's first single, "Ah-Ah", came out on June 22.

== Versions ==
The mini-album was released in two versions, Passion and Dream, both versions having different covers, physical disc designs and photo books.

== Chart performance ==
In Korea, Natural Born Teen Top topped local charts like Hanteo and Synnara Records from June 22 to June 28 with the Passion version of “Natural Born Teen Top” getting the top spot and the Dream version of the Album at number 2.

Natural Born Teen Top topped Gaon's Weekly Album Sales Chart in its first week. It also debuted at #13 on Billboard's World Albums Chart and "Ah-Ah" peaked at #20 on Billboard's World Digital Songs Chart.

== Track listing ==
Credits adapted from the official homepage.

| No. | Title | Lyrics | Music | Length |
|---|---|---|---|---|
| 1. | "Hot Like Fire" | Black Eyed Pilseung, Sam Lewis, L.Joe | Black Eyed Pilseung | 2:54 |
| 2. | "아침부터 아침까지 (Ah-Ah)" | Black Eyed Pilseung, Sam Lewis | Black Eyed Pilseung | 3:20 |
| 3. | "5계절 (5 Seasons)" | Changjo, Heo Seong Jin | Heo Seong Jin | 3:37 |
| 4. | "그 전화 받지 마 (Please)" | Niel, Danis Seo, Shin Seung Ik, CAP, L.Joe | Niel, Shin Seung Ik, Danis Seo | 3:21 |
| 5. | "I Love It" | Sam Lewis | Sam Lewis | 3:12 |
| 6. | "헷갈려 (Confusing)" | Black Eyed Pilseung, Sam Lewis | Black Eyed Pilseung | 3:17 |
| Total length: | | | | 19:41 |

== Sales and certifications ==
| Chart | Amount |
|---|---|
| Gaon physical sales | 58,424+ |
| Oricon physical sales | 21,504+ |

== Release history ==
| Region | Date | Format | Label |
|---|---|---|---|
| South Korea | June 22, 2015 | CD, digital download | TOP Media, LOEN Entertainment |
| Worldwide | June 22, 2015 | Digital download | TOP Media |
| Japan | June 24, 2015 | CD, digital download | Loen Entertainment |
