= Juniel =

South Korean singer (born 1993)

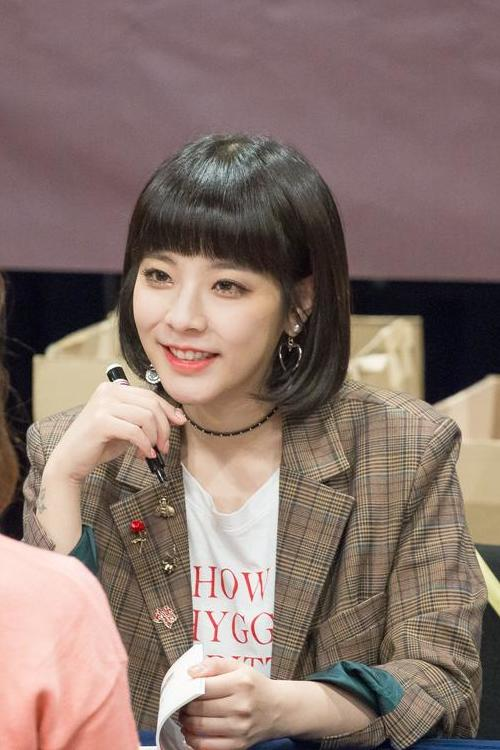
- Juniel in 2017

Background information
- Born: Choi Jun-hee (최준희); 3 September 1993 (age 33); Seoul, South Korea
- Genres: K-pop; J-pop; Pop rock; Ballad
- Occupation: Singer-songwriter
- Instruments: Vocals; guitar; piano
- Years active: 2011–present
- Labels: FNC Entertainment; C9 Entertainment; Warner Music Group
- Formerly of: Romantic J; Poetic Narrator

Korean name
- Hangul: 최서아
- RR: Choe Seoa
- MR: Ch'oe Sŏa

Former name
- Hangul: 최준희
- RR: Choe Junhui
- MR: Ch'oe Chunhŭi

Choi Seo-ah (Korean: 최서아; born 3 September 1993), better known by her stage name Juniel (주니엘) is a South Korean singer-songwriter. She began her career in Japan in 2011 before debuting in South Korea in 2012. In addition to her output as a solo artist, Juniel has released music as a member of the duos Romantic J (with Lee Jong-hyun), and Poetic Narrator (with Doko).

== Life and career ==
=== 1993–2010: Early life and career beginnings ===
Juniel was born Choi Jun-hee on 3 September 1993, in Seoul, South Korea. She started playing the guitar as a child, and, at the age of 16, she wrote her first song, "Boy", which was later included on her first Japanese EP. Initially a trainee at Good Entertainment, Juniel later joined FNC Entertainment when she was in middle school. She attended the School of Performing Arts Seoul for high school and studied abroad in Japan, where she won the Japanese audition program Niji Iro Supernova, beating out many other singers and songwriters from the country.

=== 2011: Ready Go, Dream & Hope, and label change ===
Juniel released her first Japanese EP, titled Ready Go, on 29 April 2011. Her second EP, Dream & Hope, was released on 12 July 2011. In November, Juniel underwent a label change to Warner Music Japan and made her major label debut with the single "Forever". She promoted the single with a solo concert on 12 November at Space Shower TV The Diner, a concert venue in Shibuya.

=== 2012: South Korean debut, My First June, and 1&1 ===
Juniel released her second Japanese single, "Sakura ~Todokanu Omoi~" (さくら～とどかぬ想い～), on 15 February 2012.

On 22 May, Juniel released her first Korean song, a duet with Jung Yong-hwa, titled "Fool" (바보). On 7 June, she released her debut Korean EP, My First June, which includes the lead single "Illa Illa" (일라 일라). Her self-composed songs, which were previously released in Japan, were also included on the EP. "Illa Illa" was later chosen as the theme song for the character Im Mae-ari, played by Yoon Jin-yi, in the Korean drama series A Gentleman's Dignity. Juniel made a cameo appearance on the series as a street performer in Hongdae.

Juniel's second EP, 1&1, was released on 20 November 2012. 1&1 peaked at number four on the Gaon Album Chart, selling a total of 3,097 copies. The music video for its lead single, "Bad Man", was released on the same day, peaking at number four on both the Gaon and Billboard Korea K-Pop Hot 100 charts. Other songs included on the album are Korean remakes of "Boy", "Oh Happy Day", "Cat Day" and a new song co-written and co-composed by Juniel titled, "Happy Ending".

=== 2013: Juni, Fall in L, DOKKUN PROJECT and Romantic J ===
Juniel received the Rookie Award at the 27th Golden Disk Awards on 15 January 2013, in Kuala Lumpur, Malaysia, and was invited to perform at MIDEM festival's Happy Hour Business Party in Cannes, France, on 27 January 2013. She released her debut Japanese studio album Juni on 6 March 2013, which consists of eleven self-composed songs and a Japanese version of the duet "Babo" with CNBLUE's Jung Yong-hwa.

A month later, her third extended play titled Fall in L released on 25 April 2013. The EP is composed of four songs: the lead track "Gwiyeoun Namja" (귀여운 남자; "Pretty Boy"), "Date" (데이트), "Jamkkodae" (잠꼬대; "Sleep Talking") and "My Lips". On the same day of its release, "Gwiyeoun Namja" topped several Korean real-time music charts. On 2 May 2013, Juniel was appointed honorary ambassador for teenagers at the 2013 Teenage Family Month Ceremony.

On 18 July, Juniel released a digital single titled "Love You More Than Ever" featuring Hanhae from PHANTOM as a part of producer Kim Do Hoon's 'DOKKUN PROJECT'. The song immediately topped the online Korean music charts such as Bugs, Soribada & Naver Music after its release.

On 9 December, Juniel and CNBLUE's Lee Jonghyun formed a duet and released a winter special digital album called 'Romantic J' with the song titled "Love Falls". The song was inspired by the movie "Music and Lyrics", where Lee Jonghyun is the music composer and Juniel is the lyricist.

=== 2014–2015: I Think I'm in Love and collaboration ===
FNC Entertainment has confirmed Juniel's comeback, on 29 September with her title track I Think I'm in Love. It has been over one year and five months since her last comeback with Pretty Boy.

In April 2015, Juniel collaborated with Teen Top's Niel for release a duet called "Spring Love". Niel & Juniel had their debut stage on Mnet's M! Countdown on 16 April 2015.

On 21 August, Juniel made a comeback with her second digital single "Sorry" on Music Bank.

=== 2016–present: Label change and Poetic Narrator ===
On 20 January 2016, FNC Entertainment announced that Juniel would not be continuing her contract. The agency stated that "Juniel's contract expires at the end of the month. Both parties discussed whether or not to renew the contract and following Juniel's intention, we′ve decided not to renew the contract". On 22 February, a C9 Entertainment representative said that they've recently signed a contract with Juniel.

In 2020, she formed the duo Poetic Narrator with musician/producer Doko, and announced that she would be going by her given name, Seo Ah. They released their mini-album, Poetic License on 23 January.

On 28 December 2021, C9 Entertainment announced that Juniel would not be renewing her contract.

On 11 June 2022, Juniel signed a contract with K Tigers Entertainment.

== Discography ==
=== Studio albums ===
- Juni (2013)

== Awards and nominations ==
Year	Awards	Category	Result
2010	Japan Niji Iro Supernova	Winner	Won
2012	Cyworld Digital Music Awards	Rookie of the Month (June) ("Fool")	Won
2012	14th Mnet Asian Music Awards	Artist of the Year	Nominated
2012	14th Mnet Asian Music Awards	Best New Female Artist	Nominated
2012	19th Korean Entertainment Arts Awards	Rookie Singer Award	Won
2012	4th Melon Music Awards	Rookie Award	Nominated
2012	4th Melon Music Awards	T-Store Best Song Award ("illa illa")	Nominated
2012	The 27th Golden Disk Awards	Digital Bonsang ("illa illa")	Nominated
2012	The 27th Golden Disk Awards	Popularity Award	Nominated
2012	The 27th Golden Disk Awards	New Rising Star Award	Won
2012	The 22nd High1 Seoul Music Awards	Rookie Award	Nominated
2012	The 22nd High1 Seoul Music Awards	Popularity Award	Nominated

== Filmography ==
Television
Year	Title	Role	Notes
2012	A Gentleman's Dignity	Street performer	Episode 13; Cameo appearance
2013/14	Cheongdam-dong 111	herself	reality show

== Endorsements ==
- 2012: Bean Pole's Bike Repair Shop (with Busker Busker)
- 2013: Sunny10 (with EXO)
- 2013: Elite (with Infinite)
- 2014: Buckaroo Jeans (China)

== Concerts ==
- 10th-anniversary concert 'Junniversary' (2022)
