= Byung Hun (entertainer) =

South Korean actor

Lee Byung-Hun
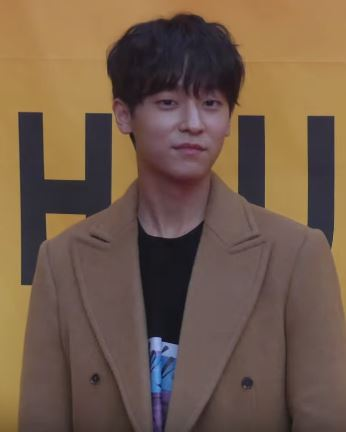
- Byung Hun in October 2018
- Born: November 23, 1993 (age 32); Gunsan, North Jeolla Province, South Korea
- Other name: L.Joe
- Occupation: Singer • Actor
- Years active: 2010–present
- Agent: SidusHQ

Korean name
- Hangul: 이병헌
- RR: I Byeongheon
- MR: I Pyŏnghŏn
- Musical career
- Formerly of: Teen Top

Lee Byung-hun (Korean: 이병헌; born November 23, 1993), known mononymously as Byung Hun, is a South Korean actor and singer. He debuted as a member of the South Korean boy band Teen Top in 2010 under the stage name L.Joe and left in 2017 until he nullified his contract with TOP Media.

== Early life and education ==
Born in Gunsan, North Jeolla Province, South Korea on November 23, 1993. Byung Hun's legal name is 'Lee Byung Hun' and should not be confused with the South Korean actor Lee Byung-hun, both share the exact spelling in Hangul and Hanja as stated by Byung Hun on an episode of MBC Every1's 'Video Star'.

At the age of 12, he immigrated to Oregon, USA for five years before returning to South Korea. While living in the United States, people around him give him the nickname "Joe". Per his stage name, L.Joe, as a member of Teen Top, was the combination of his surname 'Lee' and nickname 'Joe.'

== Career ==
=== 2010–2017: Teen Top and controversy ===
Byung Hun debuted with his fellow band group Teen Top under TOP Media on July 10, 2010, with their debut song titled "Clap" (박수).

In February 2017, Byung Hun filed for nullification of the contract with T.O.P Media and left TEEN TOP. The reason as to why he wanted to nullify his exclusive contract with TOP Media is still unknown. Issues first surfaced when Byung Hun met T.O.P Media to renew his contract in October 2016. In June 2017, Byung Hun promoted with Teen Top for the last time as L.Joe. His contract with Teen Top did not expire until January 10, 2018.

=== 2017–present: Solo activities ===
On May 29, 2018, it was confirmed that Byung Hun will be appearing in Let's Eat 3. The Let's Eat series first aired in 2013 and again in 2015, which gained wide popularity for its realistic portrayal of people who live alone and their eating habits.

In November 2022, Byung Hun signed a contract with SidusHQ.

== Filmography ==
=== Films ===
Year	Title	Role	Notes
2016	Trumpet of the Cliff	Zio	

=== Drama series ===
Year	Title	Role	Notes
2014	Flower Grandpa Investigation Unit	Uhm Shi-woo	ep. 7
2015	The Missing	Yang Jung-ho	ep. 7
2016	Entertainer	Seo Jae-hoon	
2018	Let's Eat 3	Kim Jin-seok	
2018–2019	A Pledge to God	Jo Seung-hoon	
2019	Nokdu Flower	Beon-gae	
2019	Class of Lies	An Byung-ho	
2019	Melting Me Softly	young Kim Jin	
2020	When My Love Blooms	Joo Young-woo	
2023	Joseon Attorney	Young-sil's husband	ep. 5–6
