= Snow Kiss =

Single album by Teen Top
- Released: December 10, 2014
- Recorded: 2014
- Genre: K-pop
- Length: 10:06
- Label: TOP Media

Teen Top chronology
Come into the World:Clap Encore (2013)	Snow Kiss (2014)

Snow Kiss is the fourth single album by the South Korean boy group Teen Top. The album was released both digitally and physically on December 10, 2014. "Snow Kiss" was used as the lead single for the album.

== Background and release ==
On December 5, Teen Top posted the image of their album cover on their official website. The seasonal album, Teen Top Snow Kiss. The new album includes the title track “Snow Kiss” is a love song which portrays couples in love as a sweet snow candy and “Merry Christmas” written by Changjo and as well as C.A.P’s new song “Winter Song.”

== Track listing ==
No.	Title	Length
1.	"눈사탕" (Literal Translation: Snow Kiss)	3:08
2.	"메리 크리스마스" (Literal Translation: Merry Christmas)	3:20
3.	"겨울노래" (Literal Translation: Winter Song)	3:39
Total length:		10:06

== Charts ==
=== Singles chart ===
Title	Peak position
눈사탕 (Snow Kiss)	72

=== Albums chart ===
Title	Peak position	Sales
Snow Kiss	4	8,207
