= It's (EP) =

EP by Teen Top
- Released: January 9, 2012
- Recorded: Late 2011
- Genre: K-pop, dance
- Length: 16:52
- Label: TOP Media
- Producer: Brave Brothers

Teen Top chronology
Roman (2011)	It's (2012)	aRtisT (2012)

Singles from It's
- 1. "Going Crazy" Released: January 5, 2012 (Promotional single)

It's is the second mini-album by South Korean boy group Teen Top. It was released on January 9, 2012, and contains six tracks. "Going Crazy" was used as the promotional track for the mini-album. It debuted at number three on the Gaon Album Chart on January 18, 2012.

== Background ==
With six tracks, the album was produced by Brave Brothers Kang Dong Chul, who took on not only the production, but writing, composition, and mixing processes as well to ensure its high quality.

It's is filled with an intro, an instrumental, a remix of the title track, and another three full music tracks. The mini-album starts off with Teen Top's self-titled intro before it moves to its title track, "Going Crazy". The songs are followed by "Where's Ma Girl" and the slower "Girl Friend". It then moves on to a R&B version of "Going Crazy" before adding another instrumental of the title track.

== Track listing ==
Official track list
No.	Title	Length
1.	"Teen Top" (Intro)	1:24
2.	"미치겠어" (Going Crazy; Michigesseo)	3:08
3.	"Where's Ma Girl"	3:03
4.	"Girl Friend"	3:02
5.	"미치겠어" (R&B Slow Mix)	3:07
6.	"미치겠어" (Instrumental)	3:08
Total length:		16:52

== Chart performance ==
Their title track, "Going Crazy" was the #1 most downloaded ringtone in Korea early January 2012. On January 20, the weekly mobile ringtone chart on major Korean portal site Nate.com revealed that TEEN TOP's “Going Crazy” triumphed T-ara's “Lovey Dovey” to secure the #1 spot.

=== Charts ===
==== Album chart ====
Chart	Peak position
Gaon Weekly album chart	3
Gaon Monthly album chart	4
Gaon Yearly album chart	25

==== Single chart ====
Song	Peak chart position	
Song	KOR	KOR
Song	Gaon Chart	K-Pop Billboard
"Going Crazy"	7	8

== Sales and certifications ==
Chart	Amount
Gaon physical sales	65,269 (2012); 2,030 (2013)
