= Transform (single album) =

Single album by Teen Top
- Released: January 12, 2011
- Recorded: 2010
- Genre: K-pop
- Length: 15:15
- Label: TOP Media

Singles from Transform
- 1. "Supa Luv" Released: January 12, 2011; 2. "Supa Luv A-Rex Remix" Released: February 18, 2011

Transform is the second single album by the South Korean boy band Teen Top. It was released on January 11, 2011 with the song "Supa Luv" as the title track. A remix version of the song was released on February 18, 2011.

== History ==
The K-pop world has been buzzing over the group's hot new looks, including their eye-catching, silver-haired cyborg concept. This time Teen Top's album photography is done by renowned photographer Hong Jang Hyun, who previously worked with Big Bang, 2NE1, and Lee Hyo Ri. It also helps to have Shinhwa's Eric around to feature in the teaser for the title song Supa Luv, a stylish dance pop number produced by Shin Hyuk (the producer of Justin Bieber's One Less Lonely Girl).

== Track listing ==
Official track list
No.	Title	Lyrics	Length
1.	"Transform"	Wheesung	0:57
2.	"Supa Luv"	Wheesung	3:22
3.	"Angel"	Chris Lee	3:49
4.	"Supa Luv" (Instrumental)		3:23
5.	"Angel" (Instrumental)		3:47
Total length:			15:15

== Charts ==
=== Album chart ===
Chart	Peak position
Gaon Weekly album chart	6
Gaon Monthly album chart	14

=== Single chart ===
Song	Peak position
Song	Gaon Chart
"Supa Luv"	40
"Supa Luv" (A-Rex Remix)	78

=== Sales and certifications ===
Chart	Amount
Gaon physical sales	15,423 (2011); 3,951 (2012); 2,399 (2013)
