= Come into the World =

Come Into the World

Single album by Teen Top
- Released: July 9, 2010
- Recorded: 2010
- Genre: K-pop
- Length: 14:28
- Label: TOP Media

Teen Top chronology
Come Into the World (2010)	Transform (2011)

Singles from Come Into the World
- 1. "Clap" Released: 2010

Come Into the World is the debut single album by South Korean boy band Teen Top. It was released on July 9, 2010 with the song "Clap" as a promotional track. The album was re-released on July 11, 2013 with additional unseen photos titled, Come into the World: Clap Encore.

== Track listing ==
All lyrics are written by Super Changddai

Official track listing
No.	Title	Length
1.	"Come Into the World" (intro)	1:06
2.	"Clap" (박수; Baksu)	3:10
3.	"Let's Dance!" (춤춰!; Chumchwo!)	3:31
4.	"Clap" (instrumental)	3:10
5.	"Let's Dance!" (instrumental)	3:31
Total length:		14:28

== Charts ==
=== Album ===
==== Original release ====
Chart	Peak position
Gaon Weekly album chart	16

==== Clap Encore ====
Chart	Peak position
Gaon Weekly album chart	3

=== Singles ===
Song	Peak position
Song	Gaon Chart
"Clap"	69

=== Sales and certifications ===
Chart	Amount
Gaon physical sales	10,979 (2013)
