= Niel (singer) =

South Korean singer-songwriter (born 1994)

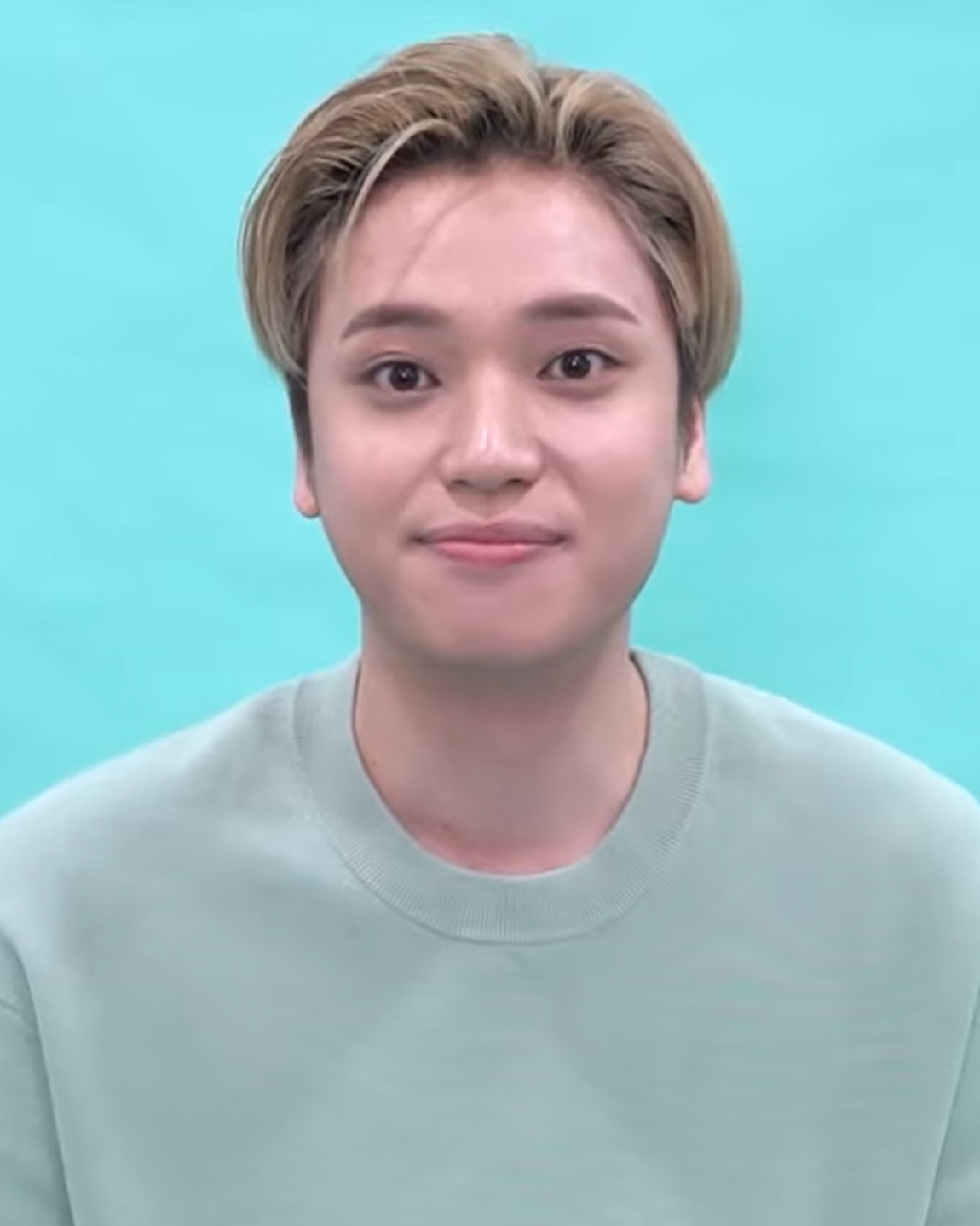
- Niel in 2022
- Born: Ahn Daniel; August 16, 1994 (age 32); Anyang, South Korea
- Other name: Niel
- Occupations: Singer; songwriter; actor
- Musical career
- Genres: K-pop; R&B
- Instrument: Vocals
- Years active: 2004–present
- Labels: TOP Media; New Entry
- Member of: Teen Top

Korean name
- Hangul: 안다니엘
- RR: An Daniel
- MR: An Taniel

Signature
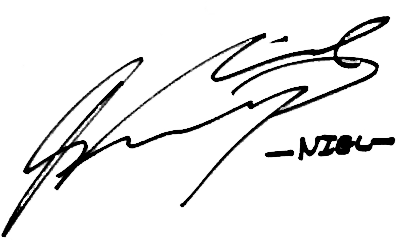

Ahn Daniel (born August 16, 1994), known professionally as Niel (Korean: 니엘), is a South Korean singer, songwriter and actor. He is a member of the South Korean boy group Teen Top. Niel released his first solo EP titled oNiely on February 16, 2015.

== Solo career ==
On December 26, 2012, Niel, alongside Beast's Yoseob, 2AM's Jo Kwon, MBLAQ's G.O, and Infinite's Woohyun formed a 5-member one-time unit named Dramatic Blue for their song, "Tearfully Beautiful", for SBS Gayo Daejeon's The Color of K-Pop. In 2013, he featured in Fanta's Advertising song "Fanta Time" alongside A Pink's Eun-ji and Lee Kwang-soo.

On January 5, 2015, it was announced that Niel would be making his official solo debut in February. on January 27, at the program of Mnet's "4 Things Show" Niel released the self-produced track "Affogato", which would be included on his first solo album. The music video for his title song "Lovekiller" came out on February 16, featuring rapper Dok2. His solo mini album oNiely which contains seven songs, was released on the same day and topped the Gaon chart. On April 14, Niel released his repackaged album oNiely 'Spring Love, as well as the music video for its title track "Spring Love", featuring singer-songwriter Juniel.

On May 15, 2015, Niel and other artists including Exo, Sistar and Ailee sang a KBS1's Special Program 'I Am Korea' theme song "The Day We Meet" for Gwangbok 70th Anniversary."

Niel released his second mini album Love Affair... January 16, 2017, containing seven songs, including the title track of the same name.

On June 3, 2020, Niel joined Overwatch Contenders team O2 Blast as an "Honorary Player".

On December 28, 2021, Niel announced that he will not renew his contract with TOP Media starting from January 10, 2022. However, he will still remain as a member of Teen Top.

In August 2022, Niel signed a contract with New Entry.

In November 2022, Niel made a comeback with his 3rd mini album "A to Z", which is set to be released on November 28.

== Personal life ==
=== Military service ===
In April 2025, Niel revealed that he had been classified Grade 4 under South Korea's conscription system and assigned to supplementary service as a prospective social service worker in 2021. After he was not called up for three years, he was transferred to wartime labor service in 2024 under the long-term waiting provision.

Under this classification, he is exempt from mandatory military service during peacetime but remains subject to mobilization during wartime or an equivalent national emergency.

== Filmography ==
=== Film ===
Year	Title	Role	Notes/Ref.
2007	Eleventh Mom	Ban-jang	Supporting role
2020	Swag		Lead role

=== Television series ===
Year	Title	Role	Notes
2004	Children's Chorus		
2005	641 Families		
2010	I Am Legend	Teen Top	Cameo
2012	Do You Know Taekwondo?	Choi Myeong-seong	Main role
2013	Two Weeks	Student	
2014	Sweden Laundry	Kim Min-ho	Cameo

=== Web series ===
Year	Title	Network	Role	Note	Ref.
2021	The Guys I Want to Catch	Dingo Music			

=== Variety shows ===
Year	Title	Role
2017	Wizard of Nowhere	
2021	Wild Idol	Daily mentor

== Theater ==
Year	English title	Korean title	Role	Ref.
2021	Time Between Dog and Cat	개와 고양이의 시간		
2022–2023	Origin of Species	종의 기원	Han Yu-jin	
2023	Dream High	드림하이	Jason	
2024	Get off work at 6 o'clock	6시 퇴근	Jang bogo	

== Discography ==
=== EPs ===
Title	Album details	Peak chart positions	Sales
Title	Album details	KOR	Sales
oNiely	Released: February 16, 2015; Label: TOP Media; Format: CD, digital download	1	KOR: 26,562
oNiely	oNiely 'Spring Love' (repackage): Released: April 14, 2015; Label: TOP Media; Format: CD, digital download	4	KOR: 13,018
Love Affair...	Released: January 16, 2017; Label: TOP Media; Format: CD, digital download; Track listing: 1. "On My Way"; 2. "Love Affair" (ft. Giantpink); 3. "Heart Monster"; 4. "Fever"; 5. "Signal"; 6. "In the Rain" (ft. Snacky Chan); 7. "Disappear"	3	KOR: 14,086
A to Z	Released: November 28, 2022; Label: TOP Media; Format: CD, digital download; Track listing: 1. "A to Z"; 2. "In Your Space"; 3. "Hypnotized"; 4. "Single Love"; 5. "Forever Young"; 6. "Today"	75	KOR: 1,435
She	Released: April 22, 2025; Label: EL&D Entertainment; Format: CD, digital download; Track listing: 1. "Sapé" (backing track); 2. "She"; 3. "The Meaning Within Love"; 4. "If You're the Ocean"; 5. "What's the Excuse for Love?"; 6. "She" (instrumental)	20	KOR: 7,819

=== Single albums ===
Title	Album details	Peak chart positions	Sales
Title	Album details	KOR	Sales
Parting Emotion	Released: January 11, 2024; Label: Newentry Co., Ltd.; Format: CD, Digital download; Track listing: 1. "Parting Path"; 2. "Loved XX"; 3. "Parting Path" (Sped Up)	36	KOR: 9,825
California	Released: July 6, 2026; Label: EL&D Entertainment; Format: CD, digital download; Track listing: 1. "Califonia"; 2. "When You Smile, I Smile"	26	KOR : TBA

=== Korean singles ===
==== As lead artist ====
List of singles, showing year released, selected chart positions, and name of the album
Title	Year	Peak chart positions		Album
Title	Year	KOR	KOR DL	Album
"Lovekiller" (featuring Dok2)	2015	6	—	oNiely
"Affogato" (featuring C.A.P)	2015	84	—	oNiely
"Spring Love" (featuring Juniel)	2015	40	—	oNiely 'Spring Love'
"Love Affair" (feat. Giant Pink)	2017	—	—	Love Affair...
"A To Z"	2022	—	—	A To Z
"In Your Space"	2022	—	—	A To Z
"Parting Path"	2024	—	171	Parting Emotion
"She"	2025	—	194	She
"California"	2026	—	87	California
"—" denotes releases that did not chart or were not released in that region.

=== Chinese singles ===
==== Singles ====
Title	Year	Album
"無畏 Fearless"	2026	Non-album single

==== Soundtrack appearances ====
Year	Album	Song title	Sales	Artist
2012	Tearfully Beautiful	"Tearfully Beautiful"	KOR (DL): 95,179+	with G.O, Yoseob, Woohyun, Jo Kwon (Dramatic BLUE)
2013	Fanta Time	"Fanta Time"	—N/a	with Lee Kwangsoo, Euji
2015	The Day We Meet	"I Am Korea"	—N/a	with various artists

== Awards and nominations ==
Year	Award	Category	Work	Result
2015	Mnet Asian Music Awards	Song of the year	Lovekiller	Nominated
2015	Mnet Asian Music Awards	Best Dance Performance – Solo	Lovekiller	Nominated
