= Teen Top =

South Korean boy band

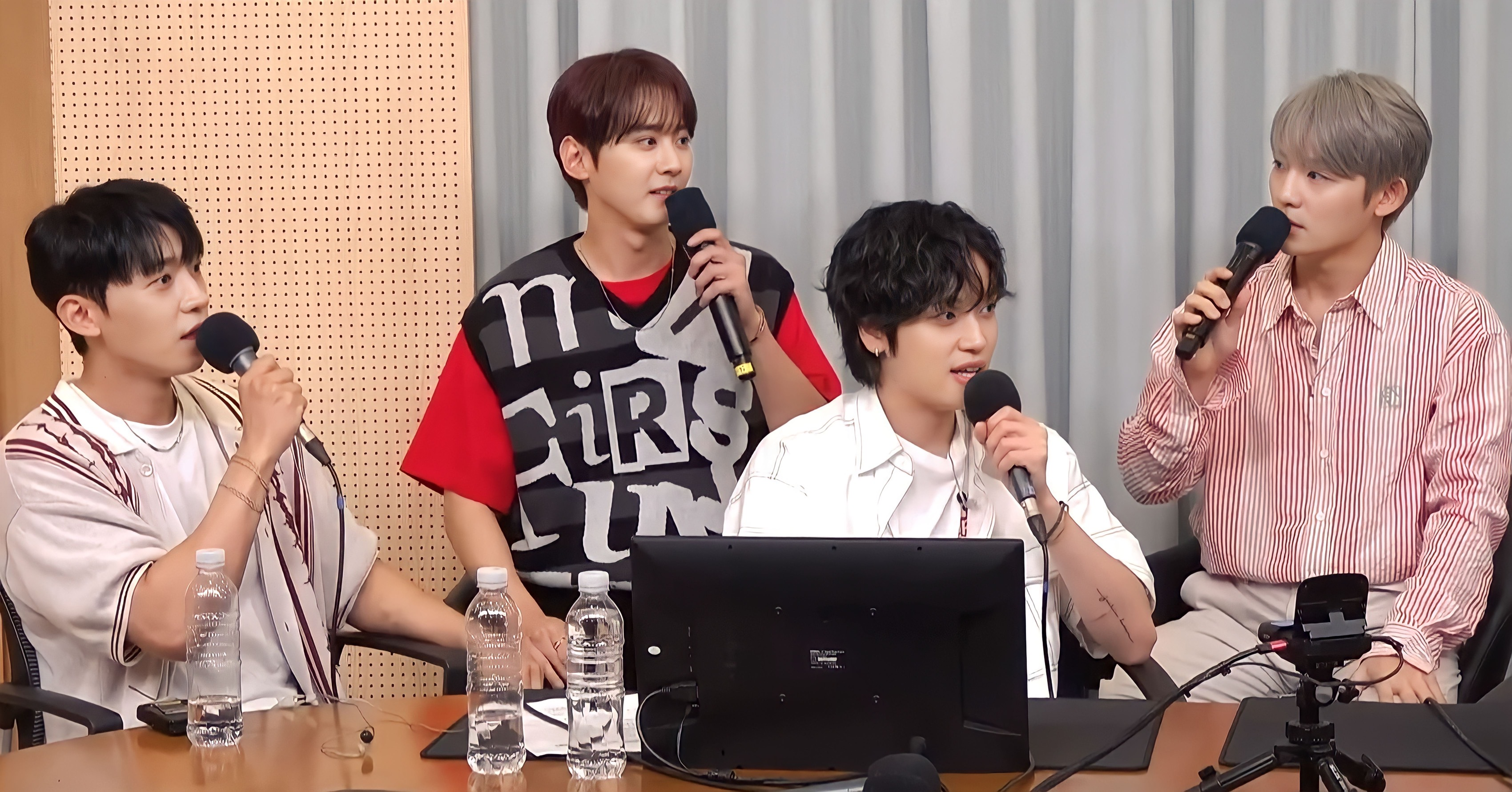
- Teen Top in July 2023

Background information
- Origin: Seoul, South Korea
- Genre: K-pop
- Years active: 2010–present
- Labels: TOP Media; Universal D (Japan)
- Members: Chunji; Niel; Ricky; Changjo
- Past members: L.Joe; C.A.P
- Website: www.teentop.co.kr

Teen Top (Korean: 틴탑) is a South Korean boy band formed by TOP Media in 2010. The group is composed of four members: Chunji, Niel, Ricky and Changjo. Teen Top was originally a six-piece group; L.Joe filed for contract termination in February 2017, and former leader C.A.P. left the group on May 11, 2023. Teen Top debuted with their first single album Come into the World on July 9, 2010.

== Career ==
=== Pre-debut ===
Teen Top members Ricky and Niel were both child actors. Niel debuted through the musical Please, where he played the younger version of Joo Won's role. Ricky debuted in Seo Taiji's music video for "Human Dream" and later portrayed the young version of Song Seung-heon's character in Love Song. Four of Teen Top's Members (Changjo, Niel, C.A.P and L.Joe) had an open Lotte World audition whereas the other two members (Chunji and Ricky) had a closed audition. It took L.Joe two auditions before he could train unlike the other members.

=== 2010–2012: Debut, Roman, It's, aRtisT and To You ===
In July 2010, Teen Top made their debut with the title track, "Clap", off their debut single album Come into the World. A remixed version of "Supa Luv" by A-rex became a promotional vehicle for the American film Beastly in Asia.

Teen Top's mini-album Roman, along with its title track "No More Perfume On You" released in July

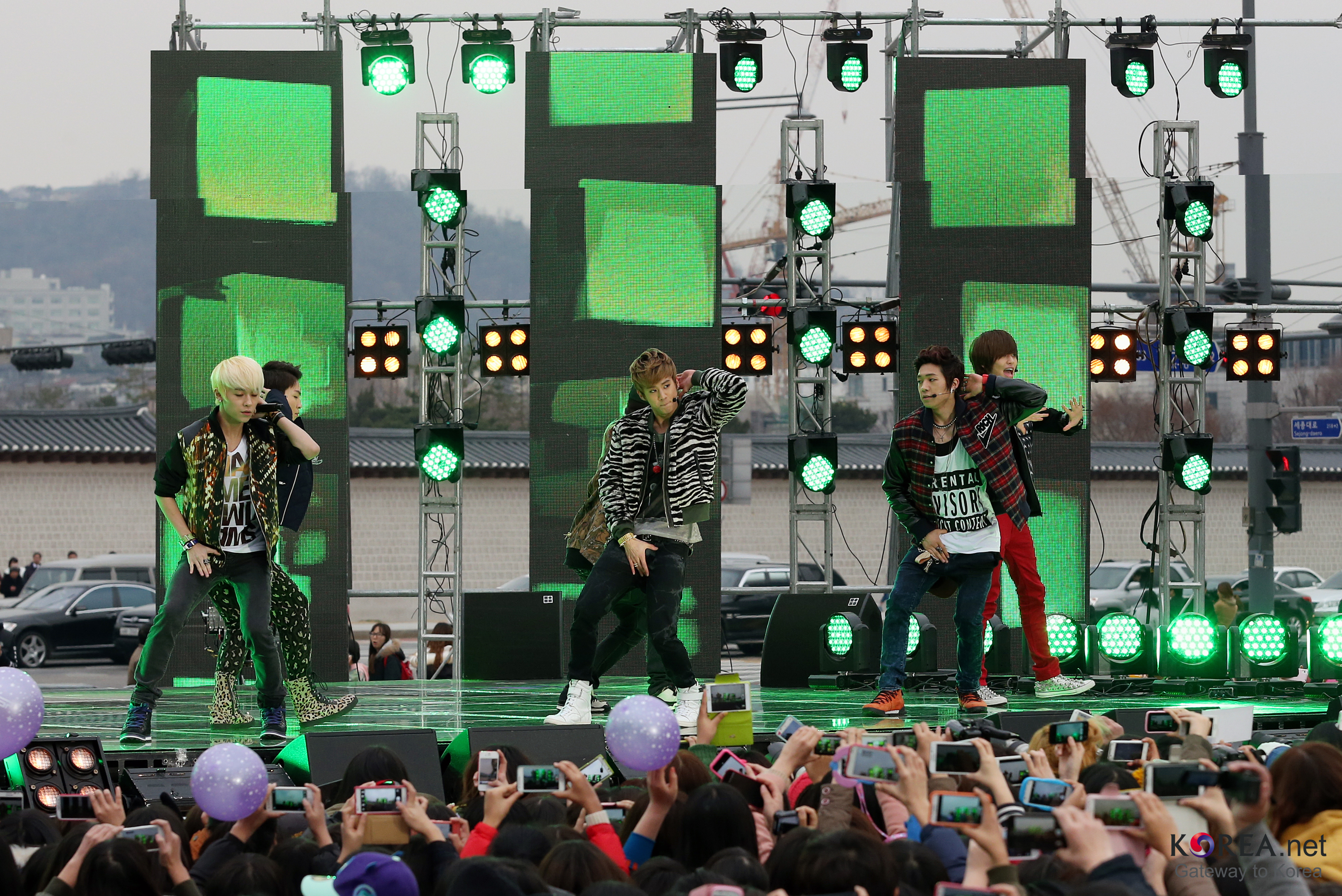
Teen Top during an open-air Inkigayo performance in 2012

In January 2012, Teen Top released their second mini album It's. Brave Brothers produced, wrote, composed and mixed all of its six tracks.

On February 3, Teen Top won their very first award on KBS Music Bank with "Going Crazy" since debuting on July 10, 2010. Moreover, they received the honor of performing the ending stage on MBC Music Core, followed by another win on SBS Inkigayo.

aRtisT, Teen Top's third EP, was released on May 30 as a digital download, followed by the release of the music video for its title track "To You". Physical albums were released on June 4, 2012. With this album, the group gained much attention, topping major music charts.

=== 2013: European Tour, No. 1, and Teen Top Class ===
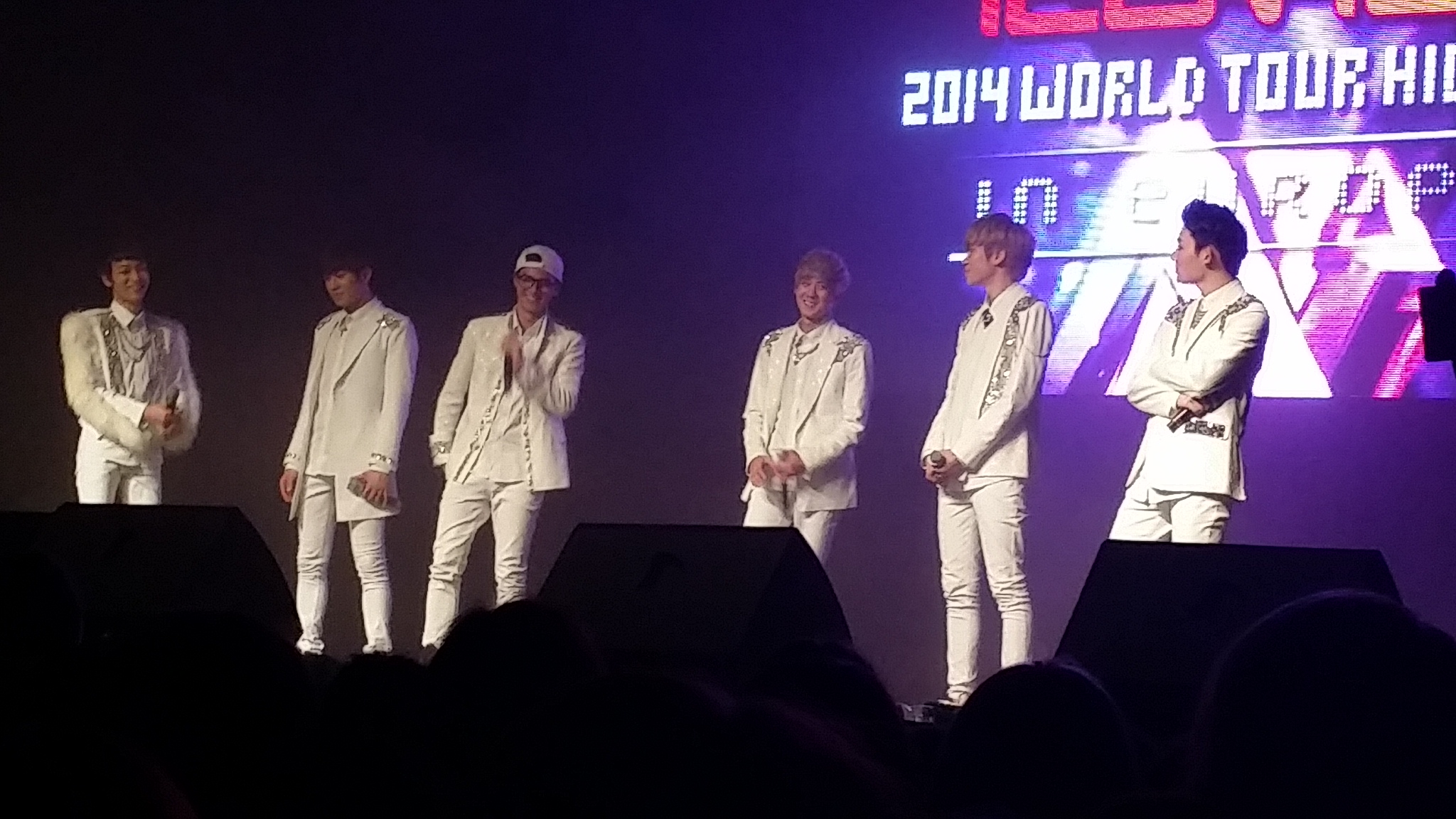
Teen Top in Petőfi Csarnok, Budapest, Hungary in April 2014

In February 2013, Teen Top held their first European tour, "TEEN TOP SHOW! Live tour in Europe 2013", making stops in Germany, England, France and Spain.

The track "I wanna love (사랑하고 싶어) was released in February 2013. They released their full album digitally and physically on the 25t.

On August 25, Teen Top released their 4th mini album Teen Top Class with 장난아냐 (Rocking/No Joke) as the lead single.Teen Top won three music show trophies for "Rocking". The promotion cycle lasted shorter than usual, which led them to release another repackaged album titled Teen Top Class Addition on October 24 with 못났다 (Lovefool) as the lead single.

=== 2014: High Kick world tour, Éxito, and Snow Kiss ===
In February, Teen Top held their "High Kick in Seoul" concert in Seoul's Olympic Hall. They then proceeded with their "High Kick" world tour in various countries such as the US, Canada, China, Hong Kong, Japan, Russia, Taiwan, and South American countries like Colombia, Chile, Mexico, Panama, and Peru.

In September, they released their fourth extended play, Exito with "Missing" as the lead single. They first performed "Missing" live at M Countdown on the 11th of September, prior to the album's release. The promotion cycle lasted shorter than usual, which led them to release a repackaged album, titled 20's Love Two Exitoo on the 10th of November. "I'm Sorry" was the lead single for the album, in which it was not promoted on music shows.

In November, they held their first concert and fan meet in Thailand, titled "My Dear Angels in Bangkok". In December, they held another concert but in four cities in Japan.

In December, they released their first seasonal single album, Snow Kiss with the same title as the lead single.

=== 2015–2016: Natural Born and Red Point ===
TOP Media announced that Teen Top would hold their exclusive overseas solo concert "My Dear Angels" in Los Angeles at the ORPHEUM TEATER on April 11. This event was cancelled due to internal funding issues, and Team Angel took full responsibility for the cancellation.

Their 6th mini album entitled "Natural Born Teen Top" was released on June 22. On the same day, they released the music video to the title song "Ah-Ah" - a song written and produced by Black Eyed Pilseung and Sam Lewis. After its release, "Natural Born Teen Top" debuted at No. 1 on South Korean Gaon Albums chart as well as No. 13 on Billboard's World Albums chart.

On July 4, Teen Top held their 5th Anniversary Concert in Tokyo, Japan, continued with stops in Seoul, Nagoya, Kobe and endend in Fukuoka on August 17. The group also attended KCON in New York alongside Girls' Generation and other artists on August 8, 2015.

On July 31, Teen Top released the digital single "Except for Me" for Brave Brothers 10th Anniversary album.

Teen Top was a part of the 2015 Feel Korea in New Delhi tour in India, performing on August 29 at New Delhi's Sirifort Auditorium.

On January 17, the music video for the title track, Warning Sign, came out. The next day on January 18, 2016, Teen Top released the mini album, Red Point. The album came in two versions: Chic ver. and Urban ver.

=== 2017–2019: High Five and L.Joe controversy ===
In early 2017, L.Joe cleared evidence of the group from his social media, deleting "Teen Top" from his Instagram username and turning his account private. On February 10, it was revealed that he had requested a termination of contract with his agency, TOP Media, after L.Joe reportedly had wanted more solo activities and was subsequently restricted.

On April 10, 2017, Teen Top released their second studio album titled High Five and continued to promote as five.

On May 8, 2018, Teen Top released their eighth EP, Seoul Night, with the title track of the same name. The EP was released in two versions. On May 11, Teen Top's first stage for this comeback was held on M Countdown, performing "Seoul Night" and "Let's Play". On July 3, 2018, Teen Top released TEEN TOP STORY: 8PISODE, with the title track "Lovers". This is the repackage of their eighth EP Seoul Night.

On June 4, 2019, Teen Top came back with their ninth EP DEAR. N9NE, with the title track "Run Away".

=== 2020–present: Resurgence, 10th anniversary, military service, C.A.P's departure, and 4SHO ===
Several of Teen Top's older songs received renewed spotlight in 2020, notably, No More Perfume on You (2011) and Crazy (2012) for its viral lyrics and crazy beats. Host Yoo Jae-suk regularly expressed his love for the group's music on his variety show MBC Hangout with Yoo and was singing and dancing to the group's tracks on the show.

On July 10, 2020, Teen Top released a 2020 version of "To You", in commemoration of their 10 years since debut. Despite not releasing any new albums in the year, Teen Top was invited to perform their classic tracks on multiple music shows including KBS Music Bank and M Countdown. The group also performed at You Hee-yeol's Sketchbook for the first time since their debut.

Teen Top held their first online concert titled "Teen Top 10 Live" on August 8, 2020. This marked Teen Top's last concert as a full group in a while, with Chunji being the first member to enlist in the military shortly after on August 10, 2020, to fulfill his mandatory military service. Ricky was accepted as part of the military band, and was the group's second member to enlist to the military on January 17, 2021. C.A.P is the third member to enlist in the military on May 10, 2021.

On December 28, 2021, it was announced that Niel and Changjo will not renew their contracts with TOP Media starting from January 10, 2022. However, they will still remain as members of Teen Top. Chunji was discharged from the military on February 9, 2022, but took his final vacation and was not asked to return in January due to COVID-19 protocols. Ricky also completed his service on July 17.

On April 29, 2023, Teen Top announced that they would be making their first comeback in 4 years. On May 11 however, it was confirmed that leader C.A.P would be leaving the group as a result of controversial behavior during a live broadcast, where he was smoking a cigarette which outraged fans. On June 13, 2023, it was confirmed that the group's next album, 4SHO would be released on July 4.

On December 28, 2023, it was announced that Chunji and Ricky had parted ways with TOP Media, though they would still continue with Teen Top.

On June 24, 2025, TOP Media noted, "We are doing our best to prepare for the comeback on August 2 to celebrate the 15th anniversary with our fans after 2 years," adding, "Please look forward to TEEN TOP's new music and activities.On July 23, 2025, TOP Media announced Teen Top will be holding the '2025 Teen Top Live' concert at Shinhan Card SOL Pay Square Live Hall in Seoul on August 23rd and 24th.On August 2, 2025, it announced their 15th debut anniversary comeback schedule through their SNS that the album titled 'Just 15, Just Teen Top' will release on August 21.

== Members ==
=== Current ===
- Chunji (천지)
- Niel (니엘)
- Ricky (리키)
- Changjo (창조)

=== Former ===
- L.Joe (엘조)
- C.A.P (캡)

== Discography ==
- No. 1 (2013)
- High Five (2017)

== Concerts and tours ==
- Teen Top 1st Concert In Japan (2012)
- Teen Top 1st European Tour "Teen Top Show!" (2013)
- Teen Top 1st Asia Tour Concert (2013)
- Teen Top Summer Special Concert (2013)
- Teen Top Zepp Tour "Fly Hight" (2013)
- Teen Top 1st World Tour "High Kick" (2014)
- Teen Top 5th Anniversary Concert (2015)
- Teen Top 1st US Live Tour "Red Point" (2016)
- Teen Top Concert "Put Your Teen Top 7" (2017)
- Teen Top 2nd US Tour "Night in USA" (2018)
- Teen Top European Tour "Party To.N9ne" (2019)
- Teen Top 10 Live Online Concert (2020)
- 2025 Teen Top Live (2025)

== Ambassadorship ==
- Public Relations Ambassador for the Blue Tree Foundation (2023)
