= List of awards and nominations received by Aespa =

Aespa awards and nominations
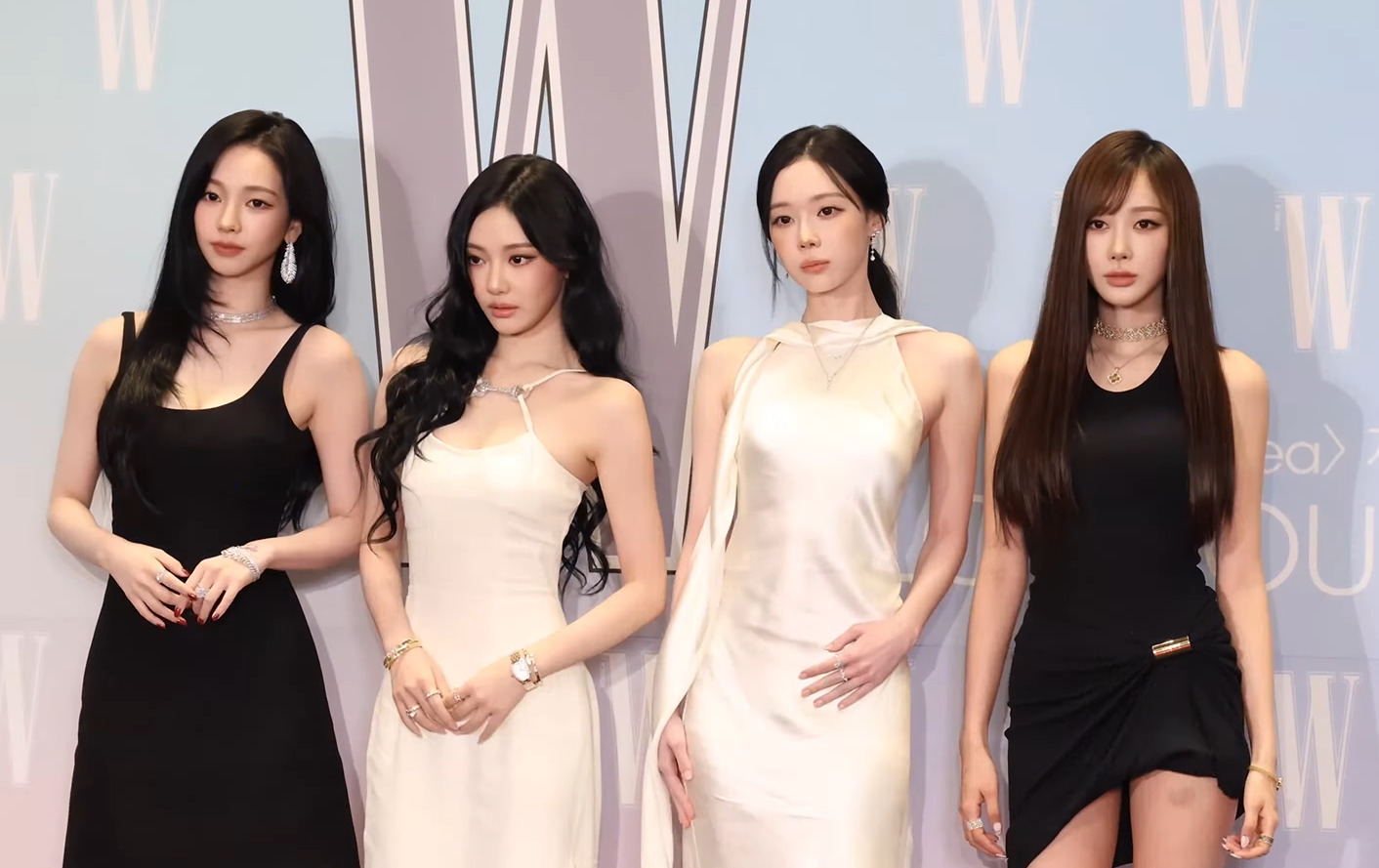
- Aespa in 2025
Awards and nominations
Award	Wins	Nominations
American Music Awards	0	1
Asia Artist Awards	4	10
Asia Star Entertainer Awards	3	3
Asian Pop Music Awards	12	31
Billboard Women in Music	1	1
Brand Customer Loyalty Awards	0	2
Brand of the Year Awards	4	4
Circle Chart Music Awards	4	16
D Awards	3	5
Dong-A.com's Pick	1	1
Entop Awards	1	1
The Fact Music Awards	8	10
Genie Music Awards	0	1
Golden Disc Awards	9	20
Hanteo Music Awards	8	28
Hollywood Music in Media Awards	0	1
iF Product Design Award	1	1
iHeartRadio Music Awards	0	4
iMBC Awards	0	2
Japan Gold Disc Awards	2	2
Joox Thailand Music Awards	0	3
K-Music and Arts Film Festival	2	5
K-World Dream Awards	6	9
Korea First Brand Awards	7	7
Korea Grand Music Awards	6	13
Korea PD Awards	1	1
Korean Music Awards	6	9
MAMA Awards	12	43
Melon Music Awards	20	40
MTV Europe Music Awards	1	2
MTV Video Music Awards	0	3
MTV Video Music Awards Japan	4	7
Mubeat Awards	1	1
Music Awards Japan	1	5
NetEase Annual Music Awards	1	1
Philippines K-pop Awards	1	1
Seoul Music Awards	6	23
Tencent Music Entertainment Awards	4	4
Tiktok Awards Korea	1	1
TMElive International Music Awards	5	5
Visionary Awards	1	1

Totals (Note: Certain award groups do not simply award one winner. They acknowledge several different recipients, have runners-up, and have third place. Since this is a specific recognition and is different from losing an award, runner-up mentions are considered wins in this award tally. For simplification and to avoid errors, each award in this list has been presumed to have had a prior nomination.)
- Wins: 147
- Nominations: 328

South Korean girl group Aespa has received numerous awards and nominations since their debut in 2020, including twenty Melon Music Awards, twelve MAMA Awards, nine Golden Disc Awards, six Korean Music Awards, and six Seoul Music Awards. Their debut single "Black Mamba" (2020) earned them the New Artist of the Year award at the 2021 Gaon Chart Music Awards. Their follow-up single "Next Level" (2021) received Best Dance Performance – Female Group at the 2021 Mnet Asian Music Awards, where the group also won Best New Female Artist. Aespa subsequently won Best New Artist and Record of the Year at the 2021 Melon Music Awards, as well as Stage of the Year at the 2021 Asia Artist Awards, earning their first grand prizes (Daesangs). At the 19th Korean Music Awards in 2022, "Next Level" won both Song of the Year and Best K-pop Song, while Aespa received Rookie of the Year, making them the second girl group to win Song of the Year at the ceremony.

Aespa's second extended play (EP) Girls (2022) earned them Artist of the Year – Global Digital Music for its title track at the 13th Circle Chart Music Awards. Their third EP My World (2023) received a Millions Top 10 award at the 2023 Melon Music Awards and a Best Album (Bonsang) award at the 38th Golden Disc Awards. Its lead single "Spicy" won Artist of the Year – Streaming Unique Listeners at the 14th Circle Chart Music Awards. Aespa also received Best Artist (Daesang) at the 2024 Hanteo Music Awards.

Their first studio album Armageddon (2024) and its lead single "Supernova" earned Aespa several major awards. At the 2024 Melon Music Awards, the group won seven awards, including three Daesangs for Artist of the Year, Album of the Year, and Song of the Year. They also received six awards at the 2024 MAMA Awards, including Song of the Year for "Supernova", Best Female Group, and Best Music Video for the album's title track. "Supernova" additionally won Grand Song at the 2024 Korea Grand Music Awards, where Aespa also received the Grand Honor's Choice award. At the 39th Golden Disc Awards in 2025, the song received Song of the Year (Daesang), while Armageddon won Best Album (Bonsang). At the 22nd Korean Music Awards, "Supernova" won Song of the Year and Best K-pop Song, while Armageddon received Best K-pop Album, bringing the group's total wins at the ceremony to six.

Aespa continued to receive recognition in 2025, winning Best Female Group for the second consecutive year at the MAMA Awards, alongside Best Dance Performance – Female Group and Best Choreography for their single "Whiplash" (2024). They also received Artist of the Year and Song of the Year for "Supernova" at the 2025 Asia Star Entertainer Awards. Internationally, the group won Best Korean Act at the 2021 MTV Europe Music Awards, received four awards at the 2025 MTV Video Music Awards Japan, and were named Group of the Year at the 2025 Billboard Women in Music ceremony.

Beyond music awards, Aespa received the Minister of Culture, Sports and Tourism Commendation from the South Korean government in 2022. That same year, the group was included in Time's Next Generation Leaders list and Forbes' 30 Under 30 Asia list. They were subsequently recognized in the Financial Times' 25 Most Influential Women list in 2023.

== Awards and nominations ==
Name of the award ceremony, year presented, category, nominee of the award, and the result of the nomination
Award ceremony	Year	Category	Nominee / Work	Result	Ref.
American Music Awards	2026	Best Female K-Pop Artist	Aespa	Nominated	
Asia Artist Awards	2021	Hot Trend Award	Aespa	Won	
Asia Artist Awards	2021	Rookie of the Year – Music	Aespa	Won	
Asia Artist Awards	2021	Stage of the Year (Daesang)	Aespa	Won	
Asia Artist Awards	2021	RET Popularity Award – Idol Group (Female)	Aespa	Nominated	
Asia Artist Awards	2021	U+Idol Live Popularity Award – Idol Group (Female)	Aespa	Nominated	
Asia Artist Awards	2023	Popularity Award – Music (Female)	Aespa	Nominated	
Asia Artist Awards	2024	Best Artist Award – Music	Aespa	Won	
Asia Artist Awards	2024	Popularity Award – Music (Female)	Aespa	Nominated	
Asia Artist Awards	2025	Popularity Award – Idol Group (Female)	Aespa	Nominated	
Asia Artist Awards	2026	Popularity Award – Group (Female)	Aespa	Pending	
Asia Star Entertainer Awards	2025	Artist of the Year	Aespa	Won	
Asia Star Entertainer Awards	2025	Song of the Year	"Supernova"	Won	
Asia Star Entertainer Awards	2025	The Platinum	Aespa	Won	
Asian Pop Music Awards	2020	Best New Artist (Overseas)	Aespa	Won	
Asian Pop Music Awards	2021	People's Choice Award (Overseas)	Aespa	10th place	
Asian Pop Music Awards	2021	Top 20 Albums of the Year (Overseas)	Savage	Won	
Asian Pop Music Awards	2021	Top 20 Songs of the Year (Overseas)	"Savage"	Won	
Asian Pop Music Awards	2021	Best Album of the Year (Overseas)	Savage	Nominated	
Asian Pop Music Awards	2021	Best Dance Performance (Overseas)	"Savage"	Nominated	
Asian Pop Music Awards	2021	Best Group (Overseas)	Aespa	Nominated	
Asian Pop Music Awards	2021	Record of the Year (Overseas)	"Savage"	Nominated	
Asian Pop Music Awards	2021	Song of the Year (Overseas)	"Savage"	Nominated	
Asian Pop Music Awards	2022	Top 20 Songs of the Year (Overseas)	"Girls"	Won	
Asian Pop Music Awards	2022	Best Group (Overseas)	Aespa	Nominated	
Asian Pop Music Awards	2022	Record of the Year (Overseas)	"Illusion"	Nominated	
Asian Pop Music Awards	2022	Song of the Year (Overseas)	"Girls"	Nominated	
Asian Pop Music Awards	2023	Top 20 Albums of the Year (Overseas)	My World	Won	
Asian Pop Music Awards	2023	Top 20 Songs of the Year (Overseas)	"Better Things"	Won	
Asian Pop Music Awards	2023	Best Album of the Year (Overseas)	My World	Nominated	
Asian Pop Music Awards	2023	Best Group (Overseas)	Aespa	Nominated	
Asian Pop Music Awards	2023	Song of the Year (Overseas)	"Better Things"	Nominated	
Asian Pop Music Awards	2024	Best Album of the Year (Overseas)	Armageddon	Won	
Asian Pop Music Awards	2024	Top 20 Albums of the Year (Overseas)	Armageddon	Won	
Asian Pop Music Awards	2024	Top 20 Songs of the Year (Overseas)	"Supernova"	Won	
Asian Pop Music Awards	2024	Best Dance Performance (Overseas)	"Supernova"	Nominated	
Asian Pop Music Awards	2024	Best Group (Overseas)	Aespa	Nominated	
Asian Pop Music Awards	2024	Best Music Video (Overseas)	"Armageddon"	Nominated	
Asian Pop Music Awards	2024	Record of the Year (Overseas)	"Armageddon"	Nominated	
Asian Pop Music Awards	2024	Song of the Year (Overseas)	"Supernova"	Nominated	
Asian Pop Music Awards	2025	People's Choice Awards	Rich Man	Won	
Asian Pop Music Awards	2025	Top 20 Songs of the Year	"Rich Man"	Won	
Asian Pop Music Awards	2025	Best Dance Performance	"Dirty Work"	Nominated	
Asian Pop Music Awards	2025	Best Group	Aespa	Nominated	
Asian Pop Music Awards	2025	Record of the Year	"Dirty Work"	Nominated	
Billboard Women in Music	2025	Group of the Year	Aespa	Won	
Brand Customer Loyalty Awards	2021	Best Female Rookie Award	Aespa	Nominated	
Brand Customer Loyalty Awards	2025	Best Female Idol Group	Aespa	Nominated	
Brand of the Year Awards	2021	Female Rookie Idol Award	Aespa	Won	
Brand of the Year Awards	2024	Best Female Idol Group (Vietnam)	Aespa	Won	
Brand of the Year Awards	2025	Best Female Idol Group (Indonesia)	Aespa	Won	
Brand of the Year Awards	2025	Best Female Idol Group (Vietnam)	Aespa	Won	
Circle Chart Music Awards	2021	New Artist of the Year – Digital	"Black Mamba"	Won	
Circle Chart Music Awards	2021	Mubeat Global Choice Award (Female)	Aespa	Nominated	
Circle Chart Music Awards	2022	World Rookie of the Year	Aespa	Won	
Circle Chart Music Awards	2022	Artist of the Year (Digital Music) – May	"Next Level"	Nominated	
Circle Chart Music Awards	2022	Artist of the Year (Digital Music) – October	"Savage"	Nominated	
Circle Chart Music Awards	2022	Mubeat Global Choice Award (Female)	Aespa	Nominated	
Circle Chart Music Awards	2023	Artist of the Year (Global Digital Music) — July	"Girls"	Won	
Circle Chart Music Awards	2023	Artist of the Year (Global Digital Music) — December	"Dreams Come True"	Nominated	
Circle Chart Music Awards	2023	Artist of the Year (Physical Album) — 3rd Quarter	Girls	Nominated	
Circle Chart Music Awards	2023	Idolplus Global Artist Award	Aespa	Nominated	
Circle Chart Music Awards	2023	Mubeat Global Choice Award — Female	Aespa	Nominated	
Circle Chart Music Awards	2024	Artist of the Year — Streaming Unique Listeners	"Spicy"	Won	
Circle Chart Music Awards	2024	Artist of the Year — Album	My World	Nominated	
Circle Chart Music Awards	2024	Artist of the Year — Digital	"Spicy"	Nominated	
Circle Chart Music Awards	2024	Artist of the Year — Global Streaming	"Spicy"	Nominated	
Circle Chart Music Awards	2024	Mubeat Global Choice Award — Female	Aespa	Nominated	
D Awards	2025	Best Video	Aespa	Won	
D Awards	2025	Delights Blue Label	Aespa	Won	
D Awards	2025	Song of the Year (Daesang)	"Supernova"	Won	
D Awards	2025	Best Popularity Award — Girl Group	Aespa	Nominated	
D Awards	2026	Best Popularity Award — Girl Group	Aespa	Nominated	
Dong-A.com's Pick	2021	How Far is the Next Level Award	Aespa	Won	
Entop Awards (Note: The Entop Awards were created to internally select and celebrate the best cases among the numerous IPs and technological innovations presented by Kakao Entertainment as a company encompassing music, stories, and media throughout the year, as well as projects that led to the company's growth.)	2024	Best IP	"Supernova"	Won	
The Fact Music Awards	2021	U+ Idol Live Popularity Award	Aespa	Nominated	
The Fact Music Awards	2023	Artist of the Year (Bonsang)	Aespa	Won	
The Fact Music Awards	2023	Worldwide Icon	Aespa	Won	
The Fact Music Awards	2024	Artist of the Year (Bonsang)	Aespa	Won	
The Fact Music Awards	2024	Daesang Award	Aespa	Won	
The Fact Music Awards	2024	Listener's Choice	Aespa	Won	
The Fact Music Awards	2025	Artist of the Year (Bonsang)	Aespa	Won	
The Fact Music Awards	2025	Jury Special Prize	Aespa	Won	
The Fact Music Awards	2025	Muse of the Year	Aespa	Won	
The Fact Music Awards	2025	Fan N Star Choice – Group	Aespa	Nominated	
Genie Music Awards	2022	Best Female Performance Award	Aespa	Nominated	
Golden Disc Awards	2022	Artist of the Year	Aespa	Won	
Golden Disc Awards	2022	Best Digital Song (Bonsang)	"Next Level"	Won	
Golden Disc Awards	2022	Cosmopolitan Artist Award	Aespa	Won	
Golden Disc Awards	2022	Rookie Artist of the Year	Aespa	Won	
Golden Disc Awards	2022	Best Album (Bonsang)	Savage	Nominated	
Golden Disc Awards	2022	Seezn Most Popular Artist Award	Aespa	Nominated	
Golden Disc Awards	2022	Song of the Year (Daesang)	"Next Level"	Nominated	
Golden Disc Awards	2024	Best Album (Bonsang)	My World	Won	
Golden Disc Awards	2024	Album of the Year (Daesang)	My World	Nominated	
Golden Disc Awards	2024	Best Digital Song (Bonsang)	"Spicy"	Nominated	
Golden Disc Awards	2024	Bugs Most Popular Artist Award (Female)	Aespa	Nominated	
Golden Disc Awards	2025	Best Digital Song (Bonsang)	"Supernova"	Won	
Golden Disc Awards	2025	Best Album (Bonsang)	Armageddon	Won	
Golden Disc Awards	2025	Song of the Year (Daesang)	"Supernova"	Won	
Golden Disc Awards	2025	Album of the Year (Daesang)	Armageddon	Nominated	
Golden Disc Awards	2025	Most Popular Artist – Female	Aespa	Nominated	
Golden Disc Awards	2026	Best Digital Song (Bonsang)	"Dirty Work"	Won	
Golden Disc Awards	2026	Best Album (Bonsang)	Rich Man	Nominated	
Golden Disc Awards	2026	Digital Daesang (Song of the Year)	"Dirty Work"	Nominated	
Golden Disc Awards	2026	Most Popular Artist – Female	Aespa	Nominated	
Hanteo Music Awards	2020	Artist Award – Female Group	Aespa	Won	
Hanteo Music Awards	2020	WhosFandom Award	Aespa	Nominated	
Hanteo Music Awards	2022	Artist of the Year (Bonsang)	Aespa	Won	
Hanteo Music Awards	2022	Global Artist Award – Japan	Aespa	Nominated	
Hanteo Music Awards	2022	WhosFandom Award	Aespa	Nominated	
Hanteo Music Awards	2023	Artist of the Year (Bonsang)	Aespa	Won	
Hanteo Music Awards	2023	Best Trend Leader	Aespa	Won	
Hanteo Music Awards	2023	Global Generation Icon	Aespa	Won	
Hanteo Music Awards	2023	WhosFandom Award	Aespa	Nominated	
Hanteo Music Awards	2024	Artist of the Year (Bonsang)	Aespa	Won	
Hanteo Music Awards	2024	Best Artist (Daesang)	Aespa	Won	
Hanteo Music Awards	2024	Global Artist – Africa	Aespa	Nominated	
Hanteo Music Awards	2024	Global Artist – Asia	Aespa	Nominated	
Hanteo Music Awards	2024	Global Artist – Europe	Aespa	Nominated	
Hanteo Music Awards	2024	Global Artist – North America	Aespa	Nominated	
Hanteo Music Awards	2024	Global Artist – Oceania	Aespa	Nominated	
Hanteo Music Awards	2024	Global Artist – South America	Aespa	Nominated	
Hanteo Music Awards	2024	WhosFandom Award – Female	Aespa	Nominated	
Hanteo Music Awards	2025	Global Artist – Africa	Aespa	Nominated	
Hanteo Music Awards	2025	Global Artist – Asia	Aespa	Nominated	
Hanteo Music Awards	2025	Global Artist – Europe	Aespa	Nominated	
Hanteo Music Awards	2025	Global Artist – North America	Aespa	Nominated	
Hanteo Music Awards	2025	Global Artist – Oceania	Aespa	Nominated	
Hanteo Music Awards	2025	Global Artist – South America	Aespa	Nominated	
Hanteo Music Awards	2025	Artists of the Year (Bonsang)	Aespa	Won	
Hanteo Music Awards	2025	WhosFandom Award	Aespa	Nominated	
Hanteo Music Awards	2025	Best Popular Artist	Aespa	Nominated	
Hanteo Music Awards	2025	Best Global Popular Artist	Aespa	Nominated	
Hollywood Music in Media Awards	2024	Music Video	"Get Goin'"	Nominated	
iF Product Design Award	2022	Main Prize (User Experience – Packaging)	Savage	Won	
iHeartRadio Music Awards	2025	Favorite K-pop Dance Challenge	"Supernova"	Nominated	
iHeartRadio Music Awards	2025	K-pop Artist of the Year	Aespa	Nominated	
iHeartRadio Music Awards	2025	K-pop Song of the Year	"Supernova"	Nominated	
iHeartRadio Music Awards	2026	Favorite K-pop Collab	"Dirty Work" (featuring Flo Milli)	Nominated	
iMBC Awards	2025	Best Group	Aespa	Nominated	
iMBC Awards	2026	Best Female Singer	Aespa	Pending	
Japan Gold Disc Awards	2025	Best 3 New Artists – Asia	Aespa	Won	
Japan Gold Disc Awards	2025	New Artist of the Year – Asia	Aespa	Won	
Joox Thailand Music Awards	2021	Top Social Artist of the Year	Aespa	Nominated	
Joox Thailand Music Awards	2022	Korean Song of the Year	"Next Level"	Nominated	
Joox Thailand Music Awards	2022	Top Social Global Artist of the Year	Aespa	Nominated	
K-Music and Arts Film Festival (Note: K-Music and Arts Film Festival (KMAFe), a not-for-profit, is inspired by the popularity of K-Pop and demand to host its annual music video film festival to further showcase the innovative and high-quality cinema in the world of music and film.)	2022	Best K-pop Music Video	"Girls"	Won	
K-Music and Arts Film Festival	2022	Best Direction	"Girls"	Nominated	
K-Music and Arts Film Festival	2022	Best Fashion	"Savage"	Nominated	
K-Music and Arts Film Festival	2023	Best Production Design	"Spicy"	Nominated	
K-Music and Arts Film Festival	2024	Best K-pop Music Video	"Supernova"	Won	
K-World Dream Awards	2023	K-Global Best Music Award	Aespa	Won	
K-World Dream Awards	2024	Best Artist – Female Group	Aespa	Won	
K-World Dream Awards	2024	Best Music Video	Aespa	Won	
K-World Dream Awards	2024	Bonsang	Aespa	Won	
K-World Dream Awards	2024	UPick Popularity Award – Girl Group	Aespa	Nominated	
K-World Dream Awards	2025	Best Album	Aespa	Won	
K-World Dream Awards	2025	Girl Group Popularity Award	Aespa	Nominated	
K-World Dream Awards	2026	Best Music	Aespa	Won	
K-World Dream Awards	2026	Girl Group Popularity Award	Aespa	Nominated	
Korea First Brand Awards (Note: The Korea First Brand Awards is hosted by the Korea Consumer Brand Committee and the Korea Consumer Forum. Awards are based on a nationwide survey held in South Korea.)	2022	Best Female Idol (Rising Star)	Aespa	Won	
Korea First Brand Awards	2024	Best Female Idol (Vietnam)	Aespa	Won	
Korea First Brand Awards	2025	Best Female Idol	Aespa	Won	
Korea First Brand Awards	2025	Best Female Idol (Vietnam)	Aespa	Won	
Korea First Brand Awards	2026	Best Female Idol	Aespa	Won	
Korea First Brand Awards	2026	Best Female Idol (Indonesia)	Aespa	Won	
Korea First Brand Awards	2026	Best Female Idol (Vietnam)	Aespa	Won	
Korea Grand Music Awards	2024	Best Song 10	"Supernova"	Won	
Korea Grand Music Awards	2024	Grand Song (Daesang)	"Supernova"	Won	
Korea Grand Music Awards	2024	Grand Honor's Choice (Daesang)	Aespa	Won	
Korea Grand Music Awards	2024	Most Streamed Song	"Supernova"	Won	
Korea Grand Music Awards	2024	Best Artist 10	Aespa	Nominated	
Korea Grand Music Awards	2024	Best Memory	"Regret of the Times"	Nominated	
Korea Grand Music Awards	2024	Trend of the Year – K-pop Group	Aespa	Nominated	
Korea Grand Music Awards	2025	Best Music 10	Dirty Work	Won	
Korea Grand Music Awards	2025	Best Streaming Song	"Whiplash"	Won	
Korea Grand Music Awards	2025	Best Artist 10	Aespa	Nominated	
Korea Grand Music Awards	2025	Best Dance Performance	"Rich Man"	Nominated	
Korea Grand Music Awards	2025	Best Music Video	"Rich Man"	Nominated	
Korea Grand Music Awards	2025	Trend of the Year – K-pop Group	Aespa	Nominated	
Korea PD Awards	2022	Best Performer Award	Aespa	Won	
Korean Music Awards	2022	Best K-pop Song	"Next Level"	Won	
Korean Music Awards	2022	Rookie of the Year	Aespa	Won	
Korean Music Awards	2022	Song of the Year	"Next Level"	Won	
Korean Music Awards	2022	Best K-pop Album	Savage	Nominated	
Korean Music Awards	2025	Best K-pop Song	"Supernova"	Won	
Korean Music Awards	2025	Song of the Year	"Supernova"	Won	
Korean Music Awards	2025	Album of the Year	Armageddon	Nominated	
Korean Music Awards	2025	Best K-pop Album	Armageddon	Won	
Korean Music Awards	2025	Musician of the Year	Aespa	Nominated	
MAMA Awards	2021	Best Dance Performance – Female Group	"Next Level"	Won	
MAMA Awards	2021	Best New Female Artist	Aespa	Won	
MAMA Awards	2021	Album of the Year	Savage	Nominated	
MAMA Awards	2021	Artist of the Year	Aespa	Nominated	
MAMA Awards	2021	Song of the Year	"Next Level"	Nominated	
MAMA Awards	2021	TikTok Favorite Moment	Aespa	Nominated	
MAMA Awards	2021	Worldwide Fans' Choice Top 10	Aespa	Longlisted	
MAMA Awards	2022	Artist of the Year	Aespa	Nominated	
MAMA Awards	2022	Best Female Group	Aespa	Nominated	
MAMA Awards	2022	Worldwide Fans' Choice Top 10	Aespa	Longlisted	
MAMA Awards	2023	Album of the Year	My World	Nominated	
MAMA Awards	2023	Artist of the Year	Aespa	Nominated	
MAMA Awards	2023	Best Dance Performance – Female Group	Aespa	Nominated	
MAMA Awards	2023	Best Female Group	Aespa	Nominated	
MAMA Awards	2023	Song of the Year	"Spicy"	Nominated	
MAMA Awards	2023	Worldwide Fans' Choice Top 10	Aespa	Nominated	
MAMA Awards	2024	Best Choreography	"Supernova"	Won	
MAMA Awards	2024	Best Dance Performance – Female Group	"Supernova"	Won	
MAMA Awards	2024	Best Female Group	Aespa	Won	
MAMA Awards	2024	Song of the Year	"Supernova"	Won	
MAMA Awards	2024	Best Music Video	"Armageddon"	Won	
MAMA Awards	2024	Worldwide Fans' Choice Top 10 – Female	Aespa	Won	
MAMA Awards	2024	Album of the Year	Armageddon	Nominated	
MAMA Awards	2024	Artist of the Year	Aespa	Nominated	
MAMA Awards	2024	Song of the Year	"Armageddon"	Nominated	
MAMA Awards	2024	Worldwide Fans' Choice of the Year	Aespa	Nominated	
MAMA Awards	2025	Best Choreography	"Whiplash"	Won	
MAMA Awards	2025	Best Dance Performance – Female Group	"Whiplash"	Won	
MAMA Awards	2025	Best Female Group	Aespa	Won	
MAMA Awards	2025	Fans' Choice Top 10 – Female	Aespa	Won	
MAMA Awards	2025	Album of the Year	Whiplash	Nominated	
MAMA Awards	2025	Artist of the Year	Aespa	Nominated	
MAMA Awards	2025	Best Music Video	"Dirty Work"	Nominated	
MAMA Awards	2025	Fans' Choice of the Year	Aespa	Nominated	
MAMA Awards	2025	Song of the Year	"Dirty Work"	Nominated	
MAMA Awards	2025	Song of the Year	"Whiplash"	Nominated	
MAMA Awards	2025	Visa Super Stage Artist	Aespa	Nominated	
MAMA Awards	2026	Artist of the Year	Aespa	Pending	
MAMA Awards	2026	Album of the Year	Lemonade	Pending	
MAMA Awards	2026	Best Female Group	Aespa	Pending	
MAMA Awards	2026	Fans' Choice Top 10 – Female	Aespa	Pending	
MAMA Awards	2026	Best Dance Performance – Female Group	"Lemonade"	Pending	
MAMA Awards	2026	Best Collaboration	"WDA (Whole Different Animal)" (featuring G-Dragon)	Pending	
Melon Music Awards	2021	Best Female Group	Aespa	Won	
Melon Music Awards	2021	Best New Artist	Aespa	Won	
Melon Music Awards	2021	Record of the Year	Aespa	Won	
Melon Music Awards	2021	Top 10 Artist	Aespa	Won	
Melon Music Awards	2021	Artist of the Year	Aespa	Nominated	
Melon Music Awards	2021	Netizen's Choice	Aespa	Nominated	
Melon Music Awards	2021	Song of the Year	"Next Level"	Nominated	
Melon Music Awards	2022	Artist of the Year	Aespa	Nominated	
Melon Music Awards	2022	Best Female Group	Aespa	Nominated	
Melon Music Awards	2022	Top 10 Artist	Aespa	Nominated	
Melon Music Awards	2023	Best Female Performance	Aespa	Won	
Melon Music Awards	2023	Global Artist	Aespa	Won	
Melon Music Awards	2023	Millions Top 10	My World	Won	
Melon Music Awards	2023	Top 10 Artist	Aespa	Won	
Melon Music Awards	2023	Album of the Year	My World	Nominated	
Melon Music Awards	2023	Artist of the Year	Aespa	Nominated	
Melon Music Awards	2023	Best Female Group	Aespa	Nominated	
Melon Music Awards	2023	Favorite Star Award	Aespa	Nominated	
Melon Music Awards	2023	Song of the Year	"Spicy"	Nominated	
Melon Music Awards	2024	Album of the Year	Armageddon	Won	
Melon Music Awards	2024	Artist of the Year	Aespa	Won	
Melon Music Awards	2024	Best Performance	Aespa	Won	
Melon Music Awards	2024	Best Female Group	Aespa	Won	
Melon Music Awards	2024	Millions Top 10	Armageddon	Won	
Melon Music Awards	2024	Song of the Year	"Supernova"	Won	
Melon Music Awards	2024	Top 10 Artist	Aespa	Won	
Melon Music Awards	2024	Kakao Bank Everyone's Star	Aespa	Nominated	
Melon Music Awards	2025	Global Artist	Aespa	Won	
Melon Music Awards	2025	Stage of the Year	Synk: Aexis Line	Won	
Melon Music Awards	2025	Top 10 Artist	Aespa	Won	
Melon Music Awards	2025	Artist of the Year	Aespa	Nominated	
Melon Music Awards	2025	Berriz Global Fan's Choice	Aespa	Nominated	
Melon Music Awards	2025	Best Female Group	Aespa	Nominated	
Melon Music Awards	2025	Japan Favorite Artist by U-Next	Aespa	Nominated	
Melon Music Awards	2026	Global K-Artist of the Year	Aespa	Won	
Melon Music Awards	2026	Global Top 10	Aespa	Won	
Melon Music Awards	2026	Album of the Year	Lemonade	Nominated	
Melon Music Awards	2026	Best Female Group	Aespa	Nominated	
Melon Music Awards	2026	Song of the Year	"Lemonade"	Nominated	
Melon Music Awards	2026	Top 10 Artists	Aespa	Nominated	
MTV Europe Music Awards	2021	Best Korean Act	Aespa	Won	
MTV Europe Music Awards	2023	Best Group	Aespa	Nominated	
MTV Video Music Awards	2023	Best K-Pop	"Girls"	Nominated	
MTV Video Music Awards	2025	Best K-Pop	"Whiplash"	Nominated	
MTV Video Music Awards	2025	Best Group	Aespa	Nominated	
MTV Video Music Awards Japan	2025	Artist of the Year	Aespa	Won	
MTV Video Music Awards Japan	2025	Best K-Pop Video	"Armageddon"	Won	
MTV Video Music Awards Japan	2025	Best Dance Video	"Supernova"	Won	
MTV Video Music Awards Japan	2025	Best Group Video (International)	"Whiplash"	Won	
MTV Video Music Awards Japan	2025	Video of the Year	"Armageddon"	Nominated	
MTV Video Music Awards Japan	2025	Video of the Year	"Supernova"	Nominated	
MTV Video Music Awards Japan	2025	Video of the Year	"Whiplash"	Nominated	
Mubeat Awards	2020	Rookie Artist – Female	Aespa	Won	
Music Awards Japan	2025	Best Song Asia	"Supernova"	Won	
Music Awards Japan	2025	Best K-pop Song in Japan	"Supernova"	Nominated	
Music Awards Japan	2025	Best K-pop Song in Japan	"Whiplash"	Nominated	
Music Awards Japan	2025	Best of Listeners' Choice: International Song	"Whiplash"	Nominated	
Music Awards Japan	2025	Best of Listeners' Choice: International Song	"Supernova"	Nominated	
NetEase Annual Music Awards	2024	Group of the Year	Aespa	Won	
Philippines K-pop Awards	2024	Song of the Year	"Supernova"	Won	
Seoul Music Awards	2021	Rookie of the Year	Aespa	Won	
Seoul Music Awards	2021	K-wave Popularity Award	Aespa	Nominated	
Seoul Music Awards	2021	Popularity Award	Aespa	Nominated	
Seoul Music Awards	2022	Main Award (Bonsang)	Aespa	Won	
Seoul Music Awards	2022	K-wave Popularity Award	Aespa	Nominated	
Seoul Music Awards	2022	Popularity Award	Aespa	Nominated	
Seoul Music Awards	2022	U+Idol Live Best Artist Award	Aespa	Nominated	
Seoul Music Awards	2023	Main Award (Bonsang)	Aespa	Won	
Seoul Music Awards	2023	K-wave Popularity Award	Aespa	Nominated	
Seoul Music Awards	2023	Popularity Award	Aespa	Nominated	
Seoul Music Awards	2024	Main Award (Bonsang)	Aespa	Won	
Seoul Music Awards	2024	K-wave Popularity Award	Aespa	Nominated	
Seoul Music Awards	2024	Popularity Award	Aespa	Nominated	
Seoul Music Awards	2025	Main Prize (Bonsang)	Aespa	Won	
Seoul Music Awards	2025	World Best Artist	Aespa	Won	
Seoul Music Awards	2025	Grand Prize (Daesang)	Aespa	Nominated	
Seoul Music Awards	2025	K-Wave Special Award	Aespa	Nominated	
Seoul Music Awards	2025	K-pop World Choice – Group	Aespa	Nominated	
Seoul Music Awards	2025	Popularity Award	Aespa	Nominated	
Seoul Music Awards	2026	Main Prize (Bonsang)	Aespa	Nominated	
Seoul Music Awards	2026	K-pop World Choice – Group	Aespa	Nominated	
Seoul Music Awards	2026	K-Wave Special Award	Aespa	Nominated	
Seoul Music Awards	2026	Popularity Award	Aespa	Nominated	
Tencent Music Entertainment Awards	2024	K-pop Album of the Year	Armageddon	Won	
Tencent Music Entertainment Awards	2024	K-pop Artist of the Year	Aespa	Won	
Tencent Music Entertainment Awards	2024	K-pop Song of the Year	"Supernova"	Won	
Tencent Music Entertainment Awards	2024	K-pop Song of the Year	"Whiplash"	Won	
Tiktok Awards Korea	2024	Artist of the Year	Aespa	Won	
TMElive International Music Awards	2025	International Digital Album of the Year	Armageddon	Won	
TMElive International Music Awards	2025	International Digital EP of the Year	Whiplash	Won	
TMElive International Music Awards	2025	International Group of the Year	Aespa	Won	
TMElive International Music Awards	2026	International Digital EP of the Year	Aespa	Won	
TMElive International Music Awards	2026	International Group of the Year	Aespa	Won	
Visionary	2021	2021 Visionary	Aespa	Won	

== Other accolades ==
=== State and cultural honors ===
Name of country, year given, and name of honor
Country	Year	Honor	Ref.
South Korea (Note: Awarded at the Korean Popular Culture and Arts Awards, organized by the Korea Creative Content Agency and hosted by the South Korean Ministry of Culture, Sports and Tourism. Commendations are given to individuals or groups for their contribution to popular culture in South Korea and abroad.)	2022	Minister of Culture, Sports and Tourism Commendation	

=== Listicles ===
Name of publisher, year listed, name of listicle, and placement
Publisher	Year	Listicle	Placement	Ref.
Financial Times	2023	25 Most Influential Women	Placed	
Forbes	2021	Korea Power Celebrity (Rising Star)	Placed	
Forbes	2022	30 Under 30 Asia	Placed	
Forbes	2025	Korea Power Celebrity	3rd	
Forbes Korea	2025	K-Idol of the Year 30	7th	
Gold House (Note: The A100 List honors the most impactful Asians and Asian American & Pacific Islanders (AAPIs) in culture every May for AAPI Heritage Month. Gold House "champions trailblazing members of the AAPI community and their transformative contributions to entertainment, fashion, lifestyle, technology, business, social activism and politics from the past year".)	2025	A100 Most Impactful Asians List — New Gold	Placed	
Sisa Journal (Note: The Sisa Journal is one of the major weekly news magazines in Korea. Established in 1989, its annually conducted 'Who Moves Korea' survey determines the most influential figures in the country and highlights next-generation leaders of Korea. The survey is conducted on a total of 1000 experts across 10 fields, including professors, journalists, politicians, businessmen, and cultural artists.)	2021	100 Next Generation Leaders – Culture and Arts	Placed	
Time	2022	Next Generation Leaders	Placed	
