= List of M Countdown Chart winners (2024) =

M Countdown Chart winners (2024)

The M Countdown Chart is a record chart on the South Korean Mnet television music program M Countdown. Every week, the show awards the best-performing single on the chart in the country during its live broadcast.

In 2024, 27 singles reached number one on the chart and 22 acts received a first-place trophy. " See That" by Nmixx received the highest score of the year, with 10,293 points, on the August 29 broadcast. Four songs have collected trophies for three weeks and achieved a Triple Crown: "Super Lady" by (G)I-dle, "Easy" and "Crazy" by Le Sserafim and "Armageddon" by Aespa.

== Scoring system ==
Period covered	Chart system				
Period covered	Broadcast	Digital sales	Physical album	Video views	Voting
January 5, 2024 – present	10%	50%	15%	10%	20% (10% pre-vote + 10% live-vote)

== Chart history ==
Key
†	Indicates a Triple Crown
‡	Indicates the highest score of the year
—	No show was held

Episode	Date	Artist	Song	Points	Ref.
—	January 4	No Broadcast or Winner			
824	January 11	Jimin	"Closer Than This"	7,500	
825	January 18	Riize	"Love 119"	8,174	
826	January 25	Nmixx	"Dash"	9,338	
827	February 1	IU	"Love Wins All"	7,443	
828	February 8	(G)I-dle	"Super Lady" †	8,780	
829	February 15	(G)I-dle	"Super Lady" †	—N/a	
830	February 22	(G)I-dle	"Super Lady" †	7,268	
831	February 29	Le Sserafim	"Easy" †	9,428	
832	March 7	Le Sserafim	"Easy" †	8,502	
833	March 14	Le Sserafim	"Easy" †	7,900	
834	March 21	V	"Fri(end)s"	7,950	
835	March 28	V	"Fri(end)s"	7,767	
836	April 4	NCT Dream	"Smoothie"	7,189	
837	April 11	Tomorrow X Together	"Deja Vu"	6,402	
838	April 18	Illit	"Magnetic"	6,676	
840	April 25	Illit	"Magnetic"	6,262	
841	May 2	BabyMonster	"Sheesh"	8,802	
842	May 9	Seventeen	"Maestro"	—N/a	
843	May 16	Seventeen	"Maestro"	6,797	
844	May 23	Aespa	"Supernova"	7,214	
845	May 30	Aespa	"Supernova"	7,960	
846	June 6	Aespa	"Armageddon" †	8,634	
847	June 13	Aespa	"Armageddon" †	7,512	
849	June 20	Aespa	"Armageddon" †	6,291	
850	June 27	Riize	"Boom Boom Bass"	8,839	
851	July 4	Lee Young-ji	"Small Girl"	6,031	
852	July 11	Jimin	"Smeraldo Garden Marching Band"	7,574	
853	July 18	Jimin	"Smeraldo Garden Marching Band"	6,966	
854	July 25	Stray Kids	"Chk Chk Boom"	—N/a	
—	August 1	No Broadcast or Winner			
855	August 8	Jimin	"Who"	8,907	
858	August 15	Jimin	"Who"	—N/a	
859	August 22	Fromis 9	"Supersonic"	9,953	
860	August 29	Nmixx	"See That?"	10,293 ‡	
861	September 5	Zerobaseone	"Good So Bad"	8,790	
862	September 12	Le Sserafim	"Crazy" †	7,694	
863	September 19	Le Sserafim	"Crazy" †	—N/a	
864	September 26	Le Sserafim	"Crazy" †	6,608	
865	October 3	Yeonjun	"Ggum"	6,642	
866	October 10	QWER	"My Name is Malgeum"	6,118	
867	October 17	Jennie	"Mantra"	7,894	
868	October 24	Rosé and Bruno Mars	"APT."	6,707	
869	October 31	Rosé and Bruno Mars	"APT."	—N/a	
—	November 7	No Broadcast or Winner			
—	November 14	No Broadcast or Winner			
—	November 21	No Broadcast or Winner			
—	November 28	No Broadcast or Winner			
—	December 5	No Broadcast or Winner			
—	December 12	No Broadcast or Winner			
—	December 19	No Broadcast or Winner			
—	December 26	No Broadcast or Winner			

== See also ==
- List of Inkigayo Chart winners (2024)
- List of Music Bank Chart winners (2024)
- List of Show Champion Chart winners (2024)
- List of Show! Music Core Chart winners (2024)
- List of The Show Chart winners (2024)
