= Chk Chk Boom =

- Remixes cover

Single by Stray Kids

from the EP Ate
- Language: Korean; English
- Released: July 19, 2024
- Studio: JYPE (Seoul); Channie's "Room" (Seoul)
- Genre: Hip-hop; reggaeton
- Length: 2:28
- Label: JYP; Republic
- Composers: Bang Chan; Changbin; Han; Dallas Koehlke; Ronnie Icon; BB Elliot
- Lyricists: Bang Chan; Changbin; Han

Stray Kids singles chronology
"Lose My Breath" (2024)	"Chk Chk Boom" (2024)	"Night" / "Falling Up" (2024)

Music video
- "Chk Chk Boom" on YouTube

"Chk Chk Boom" is a song by South Korean boy band Stray Kids, taken from their ninth Korean-language extended play Ate (2024). It was released as the EP's lead single on July 19, 2024, by JYP Entertainment and Republic Records. A Latin-influenced hip-hop and reggaeton track, the song was written by 3Racha, DallasK, Ronnie Icon, and BB Elliot. The accompanying music video, premiered on the same day, features actors Ryan Reynolds and Hugh Jackman appearing in Deadpool and Wolverine costumes, respectively.

== Background and release ==
In Stray Kids' interview with Untold Originals in February 2024, I.N first revealed that he would like to try a "Latin music interpreted in [the group's] colors." On June 19, 2024, Stray Kids announced their Korean-language ninth extended play, titled Ate, slated for release on July 19, accompanied by a trailer that teased the title for the lead single "Chk Chk Boom". It was confirmed again on the flyer-styled track listing posted on two days later, alongside the "Festival" remix version. The group teased all tracks of the EP, including "Chk Chk Boom", via a mashup video uploaded on July 10. Stray Kids teamed up with YouTube Shorts and launched a dance challenge to promoted the song on July 18, unveiling snippet of the song and its choreography. The remix EP, including the original, "Deadeye", "Heatwave", and instrumental versions, was released on July 22. The Japanese version of the song featured on Stray Kids' second Japanese-language studio album Giant (2024).

== Composition ==
"Chk Chk Boom" was written by the in-house production team 3Racha (Bang Chan, Changbin, and Han), and co-composed by DallasK, Ronnie Icon, Bristol Miller, and BB Elliot. It is described as a Latin-styled hip-hop and reggaeton track, talking about the "confidence to aim at the desired target more perfectly than anyone else." Alongside Korean and English, the song included Spanish words and Latin music flavor, including rap parts.

== Commercial performance ==
In South Korea, "Chk Chk Boom" entered the Circle Digital Chart at number 25 with only three days of availability in its tracking period dated July 14–20, 2024, ascending to number 23 two weeks later. In the United Kingdom, "Chk Chk Boom" became Stray Kids' first top-40 single on the UK Singles Chart at number 30, and stayed on the chart for three weeks.

The song landed at number 49 on the US Billboard Hot 100, becoming the group's first top 50 on the chart, and breaking the previous highest peak at number 90 of "Lalalala" and "Lose My Breath". It sold 10,400 copies, peaking at number three on the Digital Songs Sales and number one on the World Digital Song Sales, the latter for two-consecutive weeks. The song also arrived at number 55 on the Canadian Hot 100, the highest peak at that time. Globally, "Chk Chk Boom" debuted at number ten on the Billboard Global 200 and number four on the Global Excl. US, the second top ten on the both charts following "Lalalala", earning 27,000 digital sales and 59.2 million streams worldwide.

== Music video ==
A scene in "Chk Chk Boom" music video shows Stray Kids and Ryan Reynolds as Deadpool in the news studio.

A music video for "Chk Chk Boom", directed by Bang Jae-yeob, premiered concurrently with the song on July 19, 2024, and preceded by two teaser videos. It cameos Canadian-American actor Ryan Reynolds and Australian actor Hugh Jackman. On the release day, an interview between Bang Chan, Felix, Reynolds and Jackman was uploaded by Marvel Korea's YouTube channel. The video gives insight into how the music video collaboration happened and their reaction to the cameos. "Chk Chk Boom" became the group's 15th music video to reach 100 million views on YouTube. Teen Vogue named it as one of the 15 best K-pop music video in 2024.

The music video begins with Jackman as Wolverine, in a state of confusion over his role as weather reporter, on the fictional television channel CCB. The broadcast cuts to Reynolds as a news presenter with a hot mic, complaining about the toilet paper, making Wolverine angrily walk away. Next, Reynolds begins to report on "worldwide mysterious phenomena". Following the song starting, the Stray Kids appear in the disarrayed world with colorful explosions and chaotic backdrops, performing at various places in New York City, such as rooftops and city streets. At the end of the video, Reynolds appears in his Deadpool costume, and he suddenly notices Stray Kids sitting in his studio. He haltingly asks if the group is looking for an "older, less agile” member, but the group responds in the negative.

== Live performances ==
Stray Kids debuted the live performance of "Chk Chk Boom" at Music Bank on July 19, 2024, and performed again on July 26. They also promoted and performed the song at Show! Music Core on the July 20 and August 10, 2024 SBS Gayo Daejeon Summer on July 21, M Countdown on August 8, and Inkigayo on August 11. The group included "Chk Chk Boom", including the Festival version, on the setlists for the Lollapalooza on August 2 at Chicago, United States, and the Dominate World Tour (2023–2024). Stray Kids performed "Chk Chk Boom", alongside NSYNC's "Bye Bye Bye" at the American Music Awards 50th Anniversary Special, and "Jjam" at the 2024 Billboard Music Awards, as well as year-end music shows Music Bank Global Festival in Japan and MBC Gayo Daejejeon. The group performed the Japanese version on Music Station Ultra Super Live 2024 on December 27, 2024, and The First Take on June 20, 2025.

== Accolades ==
List of awards and nominations received by "Chk Chk Boom"
Ceremony	Year	Category	Result	Ref.
Asian Pop Music Awards	2024	Record of the Year (Overseas)	Nominated	
iHeartRadio Music Awards	2025	K-pop Song of the Year	Nominated	
Korea Grand Music Awards	2024	Best Song 10	Won	
MTV Video Music Awards	2025	Best K-Pop	Nominated	

Music program awards for "Chk Chk Boom"
Program	Date	Ref.
M Countdown	July 25, 2024	
Music Bank	July 26, 2024	
Music Bank	August 16, 2024	
Show Champion	July 31, 2024	
Show Champion	August 7, 2024	
Show Champion	August 14, 2024	

== Track listing ==
- Digital download and streaming – Remixes
1. "Chk Chk Boom" – 2:28
2. "Chk Chk Boom" (Deadeye version) – 2:14
3. "Chk Chk Boom" (Heatwave version) – 2:20
4. "Chk Chk Boom" (instrumental) – 2:28

== Credits and personnel ==
Personnel

- Stray Kids – lead vocals
  - Bang Chan (3Racha) – background vocals, lyrics, composition, arrangement, instruments, computer programming, digital editing, recording
  - Changbin (3Racha) – background vocals, lyrics, composition
  - Han (3Racha) – background vocals, lyrics, composition
  - Felix – background vocals
- DallasK – composition, arrangement, instruments
- Ronnie Icon – composition
- BB Elliot – composition
- Restart – arrangement, instruments
- Chae Gang-hae – arrangement, instruments
- Lee Kyeong-won – digital editing
- Goo Hye-jin – recording
- Manny Marroquin – mixing, mixing in Dolby Atmos
- Chris Galland – mix engineering
  - Ramiro Fernandez-Seoane – assistant
- Kevin Madigan – mix engineering in Dolby Atmos
  - Anthony Vilchis – assistant
  - Trey Station – assistant
- Dave Kutch – mastering

Locations

- JYPE Studios – recording
- Channie's "Room" – recording
- Larrabee Studios – mixing, mixing in Dolby Atmos
- The Mastering Palace – mastering

== Charts ==
=== Weekly charts ===
Weekly chart performance for "Chk Chk Boom"
Chart (2024)	Peak position
Australia (ARIA)	85
Austria (Ö3 Austria Top 40)	61
Canada Hot 100 (Billboard)	55
Czech Republic Singles Digital (ČNS IFPI)	79
France (SNEP)	102
Germany (GfK)	64
Greece International (IFPI)	48
Global 200 (Billboard)	10
Hong Kong (Billboard)	14
Ireland (IRMA)	68
Japan Hot 100 (Billboard)	12
Japan Combined Singles (Oricon)	11
Lithuania (AGATA)	53
Malaysia (Billboard)	9
Malaysia International (RIM)	8
MENA (IFPI)	18
Netherlands (Global Top 40)	13
New Zealand Hot Singles (RMNZ)	1
Philippines (Philippines Hot 100)	81
Poland (Polish Streaming Top 100)	50
Portugal (AFP)	87
Singapore (RIAS)	6
Slovakia Singles Digital (ČNS IFPI)	57
South Korea (Circle)	23
Switzerland (Schweizer Hitparade)	100
Taiwan (Billboard)	10
UAE (IFPI)	18
UK Singles (Official Charts)	30
US Billboard Hot 100	49
US World Digital Song Sales (Billboard)	1

=== Monthly charts ===
Monthly chart performance for "Chk Chk Boom"
Chart (2024)	Position
South Korea (Circle)	74

=== Year-end charts ===
Year-end chart performance for "Chk Chk Boom"
Chart (2024)	Position
South Korea Download (Circle)	16

== Certifications ==
Certifications for "Chk Chk Boom"
Region	Certification	Certified units/sales
France (SNEP)	Gold	100,000^{‡}
United Kingdom (BPI)	Silver	200,000^{‡}
United States (RIAA)	Gold	500,000^{‡}
Streaming
Japan (RIAJ)	Gold	50,000,000^{†}
^{‡} Sales+streaming figures based on certification alone.^{†} Streaming-only figures based on certification alone.

== Release history ==
Release dates and formats for "Chk Chk Boom"
Region	Date	Format	Version	Label	Ref.
Various	July 19, 2024	Digital download; streaming	Original; Festival	JYP; Republic	
Various	July 21, 2024	Digital download	Original; Deadeye; Heatwave; instrumental	JYP; Republic	
Various	July 22, 2024	Digital download; streaming	Remixes	JYP; Republic	

== See also ==
- List of M Countdown Chart winners (2024)
- List of Music Bank Chart winners (2024)
- List of Show Champion Chart winners (2024)
