= List of Music Bank Chart winners (2024) =

Music Bank Chart winners (2024)

Highlights
- Songs with most wins: "Be There For Me" by NCT 127 "Maestro" by Seventeen "Walk" by NCT 127 "Chk Chk Boom" by Stray Kids "Walkin On Water" by Stray Kids (2)
- Artist(s) with most wins: NCT 127; Stray Kids (4)
- Song with highest score: "Feel the Pop" by Zerobaseone (13,101)

The Music Bank Chart is a record chart established in 1998 on the South Korean KBS television music program Music Bank. Every week during its live broadcast, the show gives an award for the best-performing single on the South Korean chart. The chart utilizes digital performances on domestic online music services (60%), number of times the single was broadcast on KBS TV, radio and digital channels (20%), global pre-vote derived from Mubeat app (10%), album sales (5%), and social media score calculated using YouTube and TikTok data gathered from the Circle chart (5%) in its ranking methodology. The score for domestic online music services is calculated using data from Melon, Bugs, Genie Music, Naver Vibe and Flo. Actor Lee Chae-min and Le Sserafim member Hong Eun-chae had been hosting the show since September 30, 2022, and February 10, 2023, respectively. Chae-min went on to leave the show on May 3, 2024, after hosting the show for 1 year and 7 months.

In 2024, 46 singles reached number one on the chart and 33 acts were awarded a first-place trophy.

== Chart history ==
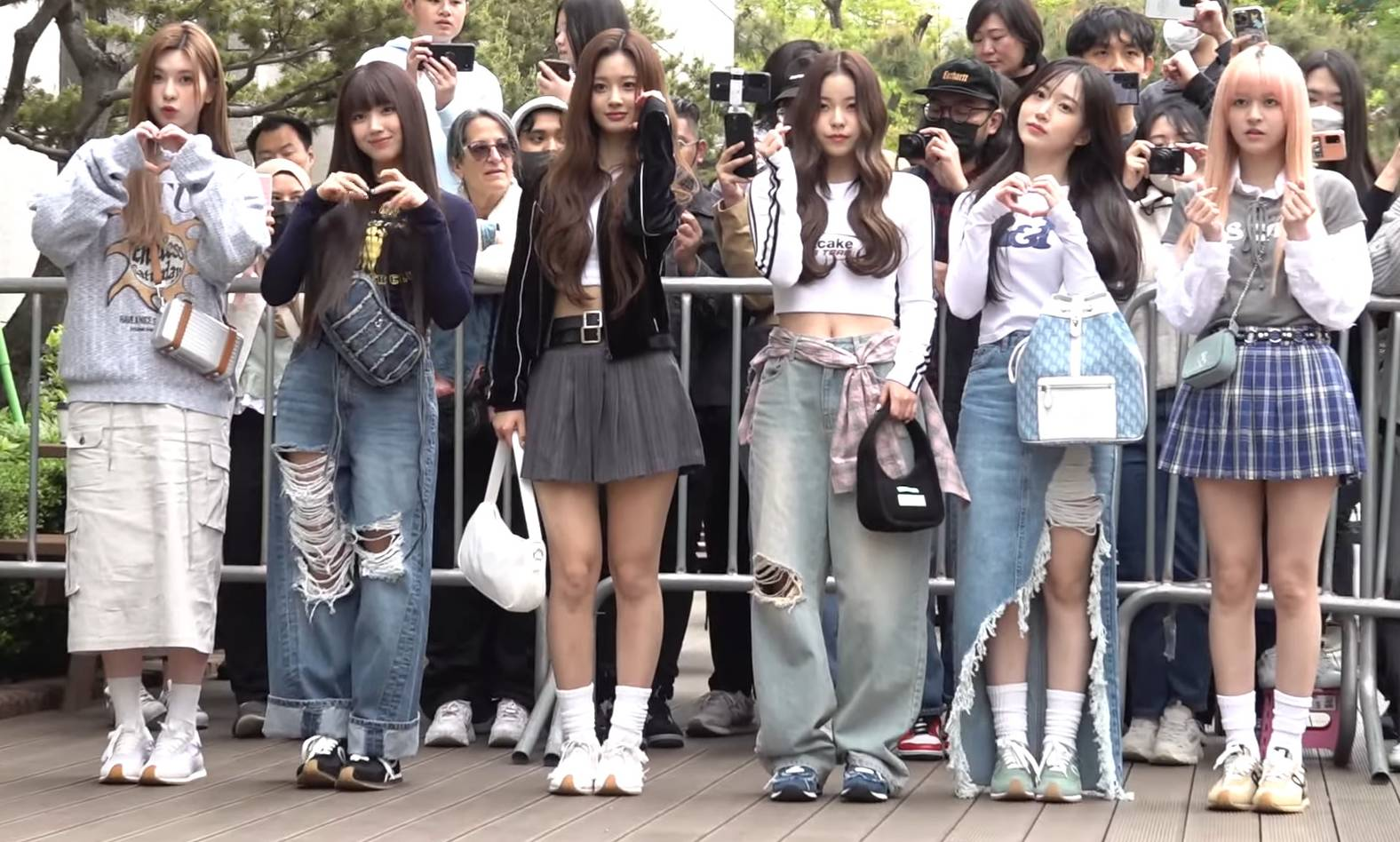
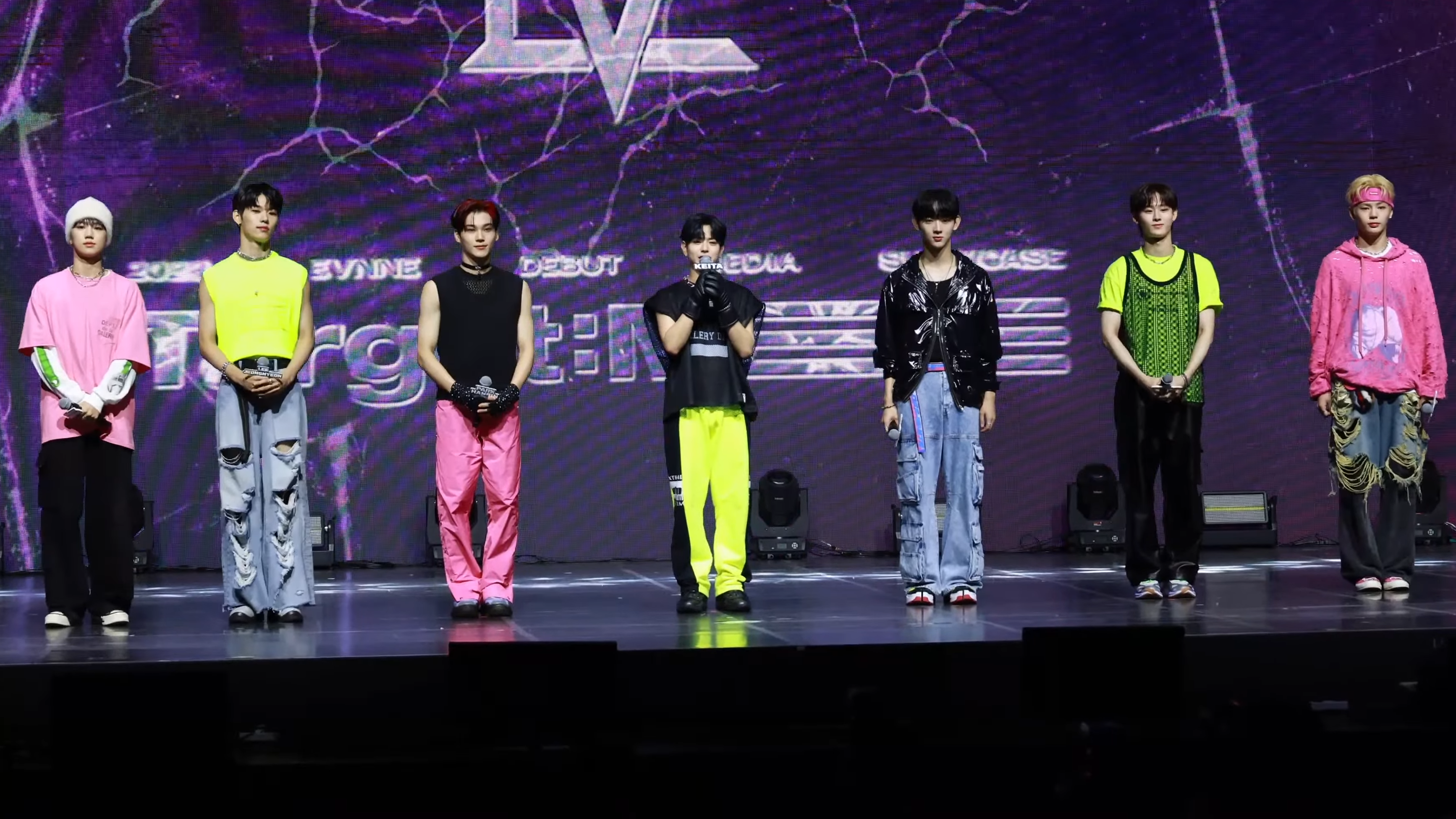
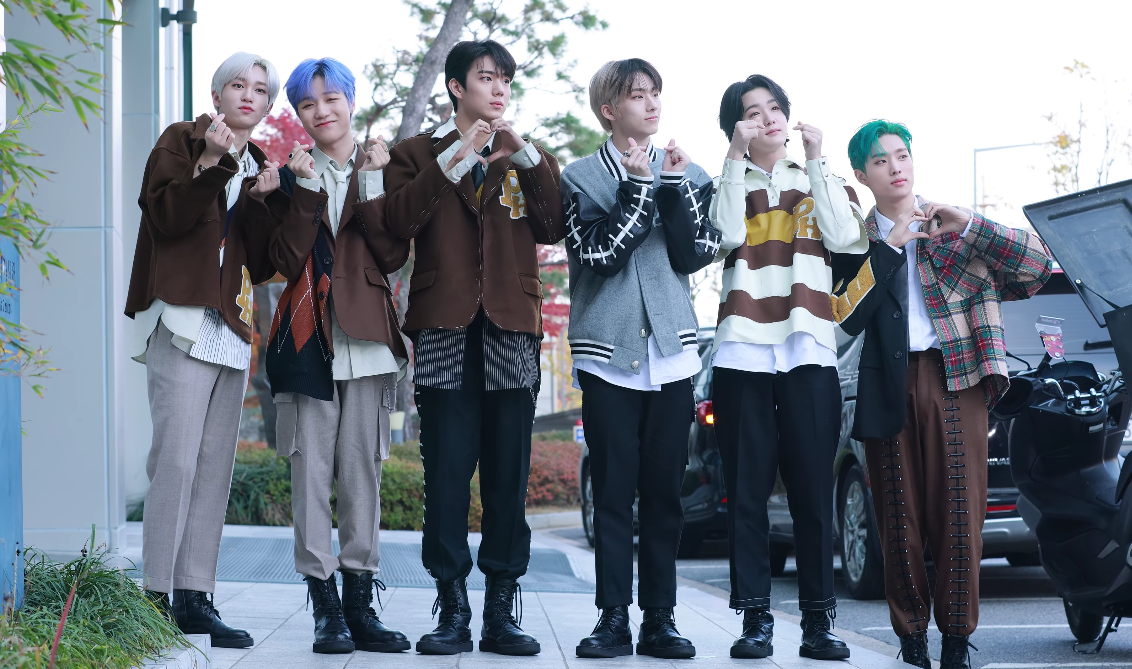
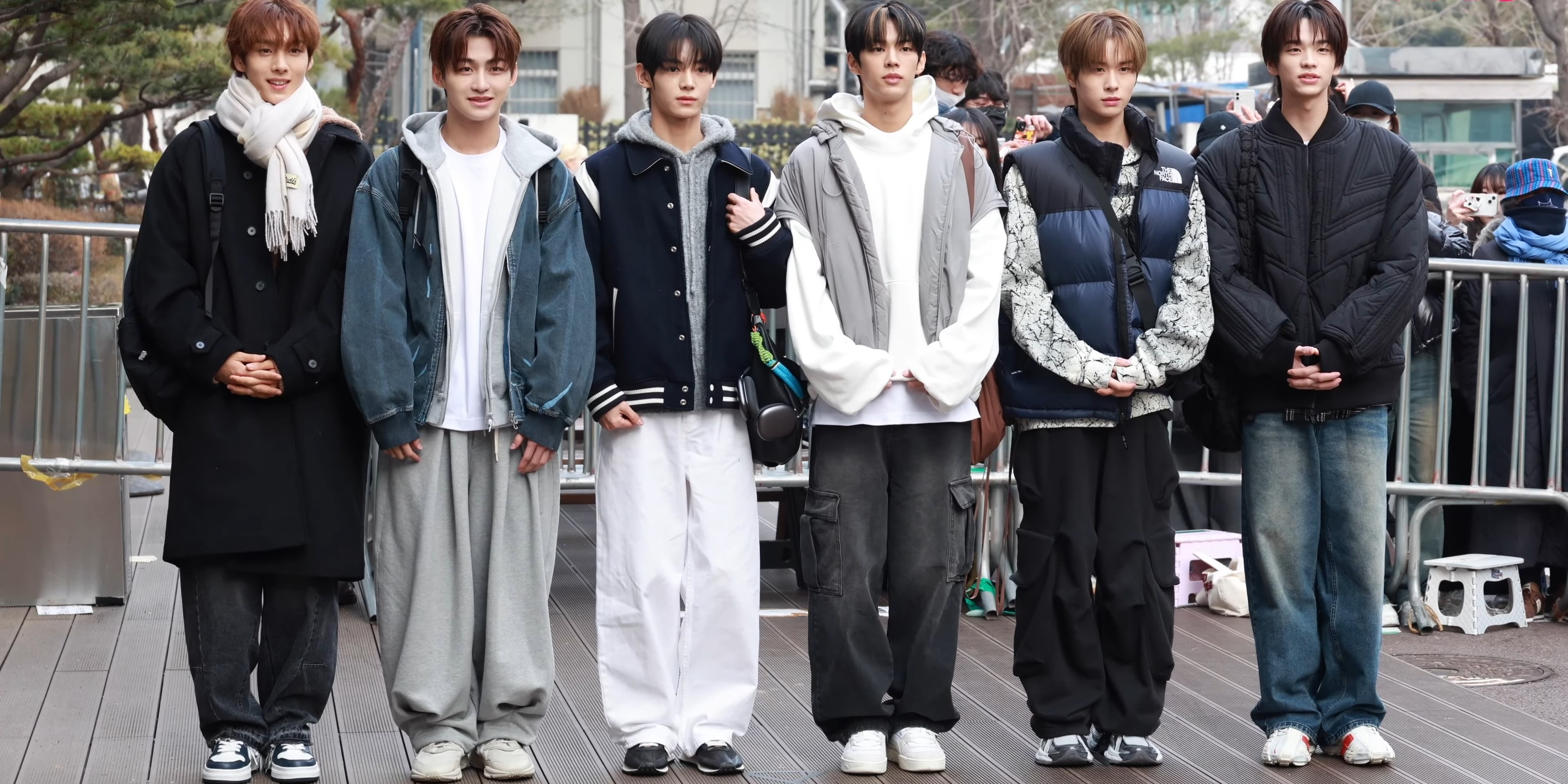
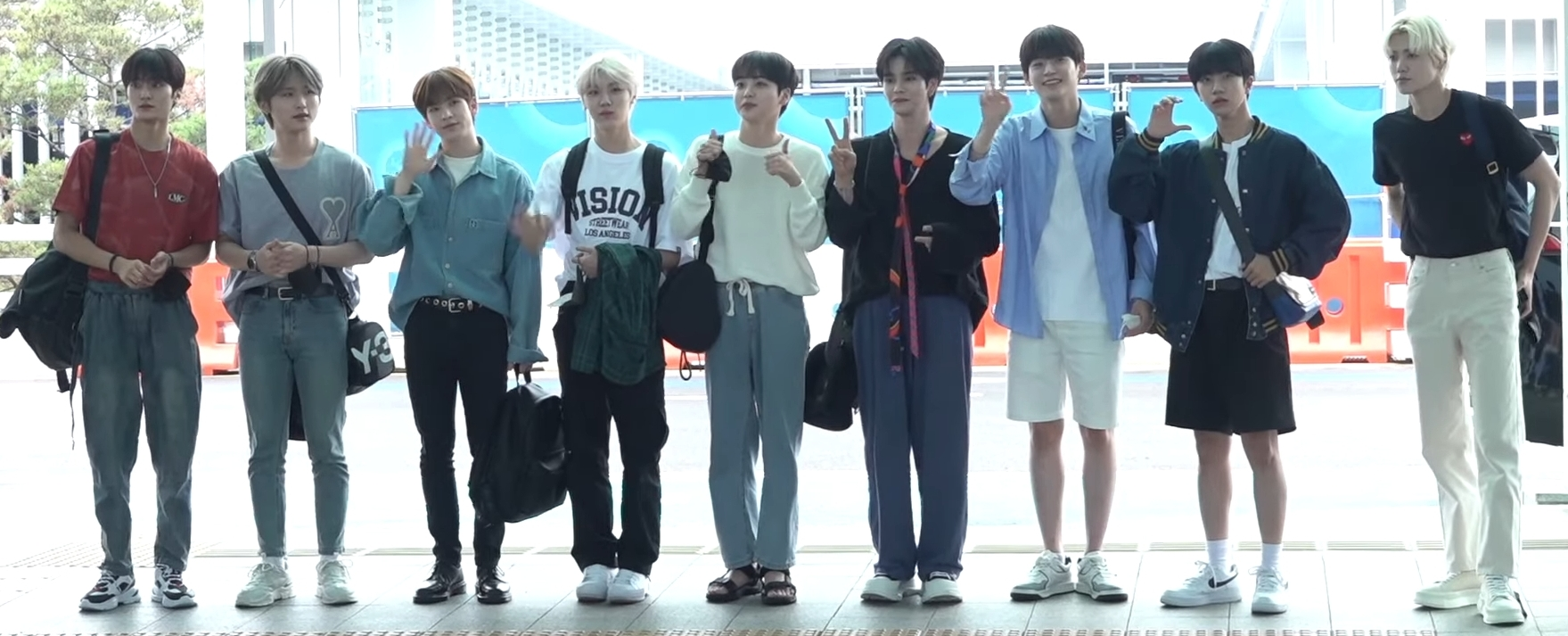
Nmixx (top left), Evnne (top center), P1Harmony (top right), TWS (bottom left), and Cravity (bottom right) received their first major broadcast music show wins with their Music Bank trophies for "Dash", "Ugly", "Killin' It", "Plot Twist", and "Love or Die", respectively.

Key
‡	Highest score in 2024
—	No show was held

Chart history
Episode	Date	Artist	Song	Points	Ref.
1,189	January 5	NCT 127	"Be There For Me"	7,392	
1,190	January 12	NCT 127	"Be There For Me"	6,690	
1,191	January 19	Itzy	"Untouchable"	10,679	
1,192	January 26	Nmixx	"Dash"	11,952	
1,193	February 2	Evnne	"Ugly"	6,734	
— (Note: This week's winners were announced on the station's official website.)	February 9	IU	"Love Wins All"	3,389	
1,194	February 16	P1Harmony	"Killin' It"	8,694	
1,195	February 23	TWS	"Plot Twist"	4,896	
1,196	March 1	Le Sserafim	"Easy"	9,874	
1,197	March 8	Cravity	"Love or Die"	7,432	
1,198	March 15	Le Sserafim	"Easy"	4,492	
1,199	March 22	Highlight	"Body"	7,255	
1,200	March 29	The Boyz	"Nectar"	9,747	
1,201	April 5	NCT Dream	"Smoothie"	11,596	
1,202	April 12	Tomorrow X Together	"Deja Vu"	10,327	
—	April 19	Illit	"Magnetic"	5,096	
1,203	April 26	BoyNextDoor	"Earth, Wind & Fire"	11,210	
1,204	May 3	Lee Chan-won	"A Travel to the Sky"	7,227	
1,205	May 10	Seventeen	"Maestro"	8,614	
1,206	May 17	Seventeen	"Maestro"	7,216	
1,207	May 24	Zerobaseone	"Feel the Pop"	13,101 ‡	
1,208	May 31	NewJeans	"How Sweet"	9,836	
1,209	June 7	Ateez	"Work"	10,828	
1,210	June 14	Aespa	"Supernova"	7,493	
1,211	June 21	Nayeon	"ABCD"	8,664	
1,212	June 28	Riize	"Boom Boom Bass"	9,979	
1,213	July 5	TWS	"If I'm S, Can You Be My N?"	10,430	
1,214	July 12	STAYC	"Cheeky Icy Thang"	7,502	
1,215	July 19	Enhypen	"XO (Only If You Say Yes)"	11,233	
1,216	July 26	Stray Kids	"Chk Chk Boom"	11,462	
—	August 2	NCT 127	"Walk"	8,335	
—	August 9	NCT 127	"Walk"	6,453	
1,217	August 16	Stray Kids	"Chk Chk Boom"	8,031	
1,218	August 23	Fromis 9	"Supersonic"	7,019	
1,219	August 30	Nmixx	"See That?"	11,821	
1,220	September 6	Zerobaseone	"Good So Bad"	9,408	
1,221	September 13	Baekhyun	"Pineapple Slice"	5,939	
1,222	September 20	BoyNextDoor	"Nice Guy"	11,574	
1,223	September 27	P1Harmony	"Sad Song"	6,864	
1,224	October 4	NCT Wish	"Steady"	10,037	
—	October 11	Vanner	"Automatic"	6,788	
1,225	October 18	The Wind	"Hello: My First Love"	5,556	
1,226	October 25	Seventeen	"Love, Money, Fame"	10,051	
1,227	November 1	Aespa	"Whiplash"	11,082	
1,228	November 8	The Boyz	"Trigger"	7,275	
1,229	November 15	Tomorrow X Together	"Over the Moon"	11,171	
1,230	November 22	NCT Dream	"When I'm With You"	8,016	
1,231	November 29	Ateez	"Ice on My Teeth"	9,219	
1,232	December 6	WayV	"Frequency"	6,354	
—	December 13	Twice	"Strategy"	10,488	
—	December 20	Stray Kids	"Walkin on Water"	8,556	
—	December 27	Stray Kids	"Walkin on Water"	5,599	

== See also ==
- List of Inkigayo Chart winners (2024)
- List of M Countdown Chart winners (2024)
- List of Show Champion Chart winners (2024)
- List of Show! Music Core Chart winners (2024)
- List of The Show Chart winners (2024)
