= List of Show! Music Core Chart winners (2024) =

Show! Music Core Chart winners (2024)

The Show! Music Core Chart is a record chart on the South Korean MBC television music program Show! Music Core. Every week, the show awards the best-performing single on the chart in the country during its live broadcast.

In 2024, 27 singles reached number one on the chart, and 23 acts have been awarded a first-place trophy. Starting from the April 13 show, a song can win a maximum of three times.

== Chart history ==
Key
†	Indicates a Triple Crown
‡	Highest score in 2024
—	No show was held

Episode	Date	Artist	Song	Points	Ref.
—	January 6	No show, winner not announced			
838	January 13	Taeyeon	"To. X"	7,225	
839	January 20	Taeyeon	"To. X"	6,120	
840	January 27	Taeyeon	"To. X"	6,186	
841	February 3	IU	"Love Wins All"	7,290	
—	February 10	No show, winner not announced			
842	February 17	IU	"Love Wins All"	6,428	
843	February 24	IU	"Love Wins All"	6,382	
844	March 2	Le Sserafim	"Easy"	6,859	
845	March 9	Plave	"Way 4 Luv"	6,271	
846	March 16	Bibi	"Bam Yang Gang"	6,159	
—	March 23	No show, winner not announced			
847	March 30	The Boyz	"Nectar"	5,962	
848	April 6	NCT Dream	"Smoothie"	8,788	
849	April 13	Illit	"Magnetic" †	6,307	
850	April 20	Illit	"Magnetic" †	6,503	
851	April 27	Illit	"Magnetic" †	6,067	
852	May 4	Lee Chan-won	"A Travel to the Sky"	7,760	
853	May 11	Seventeen	"Maestro"	9,278 ‡	
854	May 18	Lim Young-woong	"Warmth"	6,825	
855	May 25	Aespa	"Supernova"	7,167	
856	June 1	Aespa	"Supernova"	8,200	
857	June 8	NewJeans	"How Sweet" †	6,837	
858	June 15	NewJeans	"How Sweet" †	6,872	
859	June 22	NewJeans	"How Sweet" †	7,125	
—	June 29	No show, winner not announced			
860	July 6	Lee Young-ji	"Small Girl" †	6,286	
861	July 13	Lee Young-ji	"Small Girl" †	5,821	
862	July 20	Lee Young-ji	"Small Girl" †	5,723	
863	July 27	No show, winner not announced (Note: This week's episode was cancelled due to the 2024 Summer Olympics.)			
—	August 3	No show, winner not announced			
864	August 10	NCT 127	"Walk"	7,089	
865	August 17	Special episode, winner not announced			
—	August 24	Fromis 9	"Supersonic"	8,757	
866	August 31	Plave	"Pump Up the Volume"	7,576	
867	September 7	Jaehyun	"Smoke"	6,806	
868	September 14	Day6	"Melt Down" †	7,093	
869	September 21	Day6	"Melt Down" †	6,634	
870	September 28	Day6	"Melt Down" †	7,100	
871	October 5	Key	"Pleasure Shop"	8,344	
872	October 12	QWER	"My Name is Malgeum"	7,671	
873	October 19	Aespa (Note: Credited under Aespa but is a solo track performed by Karina.)	"Up" (Karina solo)	6,698	
874	October 26	Seventeen	"Love, Money, Fame"	9,153	
875	November 2	Rosé and Bruno Mars	"APT." †	7,010	
876	November 9	Rosé and Bruno Mars	"APT." †	6,707	
877	November 16	Rosé and Bruno Mars	"APT." †	7,487	
878	November 23	NCT Dream	"When I'm With You"	6,705	
879	November 30	Aespa	"Whiplash"	6,955	
880	December 7	No show, winner not announced			
—	December 15 (Note: This episode was originally scheduled to air on December 14 but was postponed to December 15 due to news coverage of the Impeachment of Yoon Suk Yeol.)	Winner not announced			
881	December 21	G-Dragon	"Home Sweet Home" † (Note: "Home Sweet Home" ranked number one for two weeks in 2025.)	6,925	
882	December 28	Highlight episode, winner not announced			

== See also ==
- List of Inkigayo Chart winners (2024)
- List of M Countdown Chart winners (2024)
- List of Music Bank Chart winners (2024)
- List of Show Champion Chart winners (2024)
- List of The Show Chart winners (2024)
