= List of Inkigayo Chart winners (2024) =

Inkigayo Chart winners (2024)

Highlights
- Artist(s) with most wins: Aespa (8)
- Song with highest score: "Love Wins All" by IU (8,808)

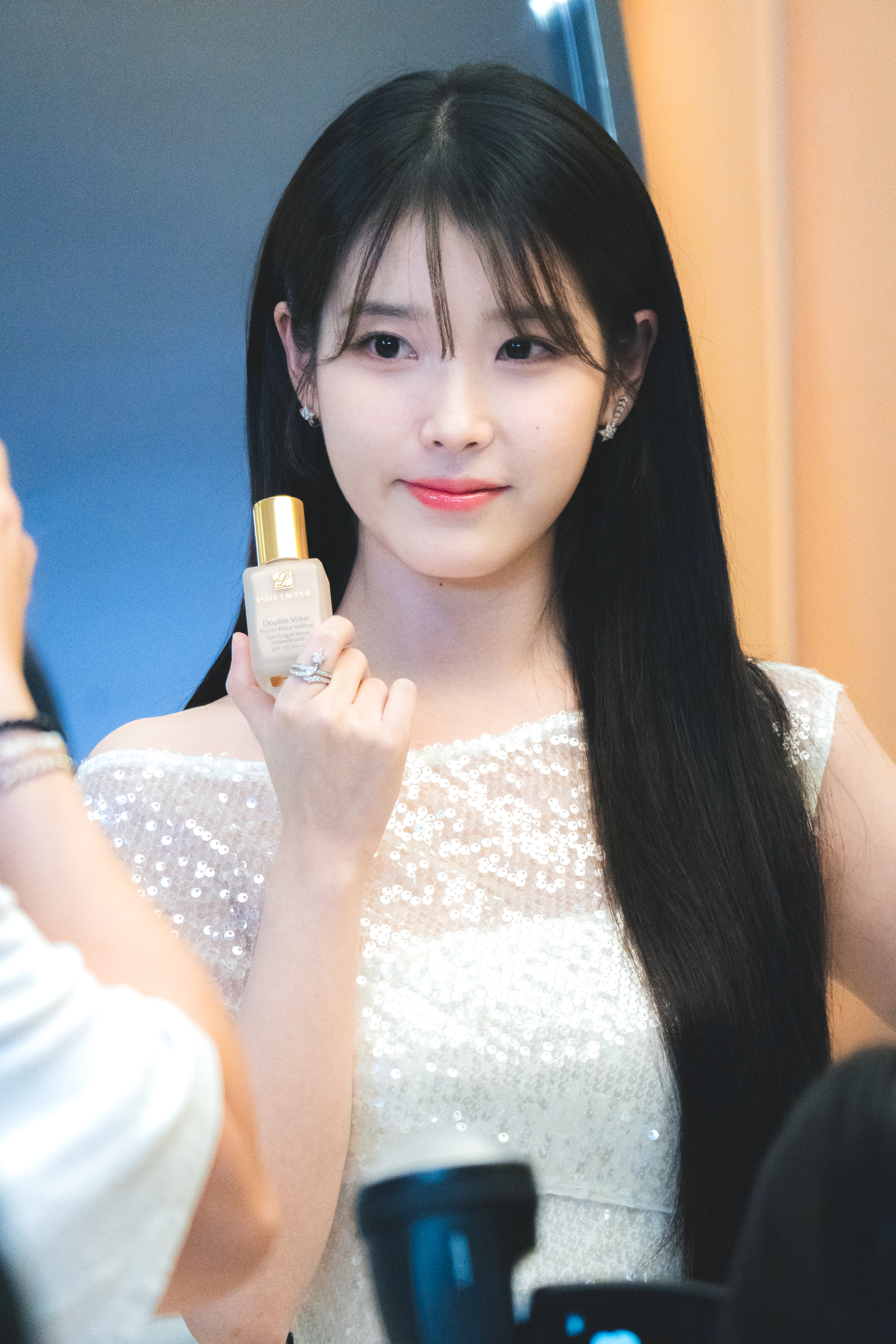
IU's single "Love Wins All" accumulated 8,808 points on the February 4 broadcast, making it the single with the most points of the year. The single also earned a Triple Crown.

The Inkigayo Chart is a music program record chart on Seoul Broadcasting System (SBS) that gives an award to the best-performing single of the week in South Korea. The show aired every Sunday at 3:20 p.m. KST and was broadcast from the SBS Open Hall in Deungchon-dong, Gangseo-gu, Seoul. Every week, the show awards the best-performing single on the chart in the country during its live broadcast. In 2024, the chart measured digital performance in domestic online music services (5,500 points), social media via YouTube views (3,000 points), album sales (1,000 points), network on-air time (1,000 points), advanced viewer votes (500 points), and live viewer votes (500 points). Beginning on October 6, 2024, Inkigayo implemented changes to its ranking methodology. The weighting for domestic online music services was reduced from 5,500 points to 5,000 points, and points for social media views, were decreased from 3,000 to 2,000 points, while the other criteria remained unchanged. Songs that spend three weeks at number one are awarded a Triple Crown and are removed from the chart and ineligible to win again. Since July 3, 2023, Tomorrow X Together member Choi Yeon-jun, BoyNextDoor member Woonhak, and actress Park Ji-hu had been hosting the show and continued to do so till April 14, 2024. Actor Moon Seong-hyun, Zerobaseone's Han Yu-jin, and Ive's Leeseo were announced as new hosts of the show the following week.

In 2024, 21 singles reached number one on the chart and 17 acts were awarded a first-place trophy for this feat. Seven songs collected trophies for three weeks and earned a Triple Crown: Aespa's "Drama", "Supernova", and "Whiplash", IU's "Love Wins All", (G)I-dle's "Fate" and "Klaxon", Illit's "Magnetic", and Rosé and Bruno Mars's "APT.". Aespa's "Drama" was the first number one on the chart in 2024. The single kept its number one spot for one more week, which helped it achieve a triple crown, having ranked number one on the November 26, 2023, broadcast. The group had two more number one singles on the chart in 2024 achieved with "Supernova" and "Whiplash", both of which ranked number one for three weeks each and achieved triple crowns. The three songs spent a combined total of eight weeks atop the chart, one making Aespa the act with most weeks at number one in 2024. Soloist IU's single "Love Wins All" had the highest score of the year on the February 4 broadcast with a total of 8,808 points. Girl group (G)I-dle topped the chart twice in 2024 with "Fate" and "Klaxon," both of which earned Triple Crowns. Boy group Riize had their first ever number one on the chart on the January 21 broadcast with their single "Love 119". They were immediately followed by another first-time number one single, "Dash" by Nmixx. Both groups ranked one more single at number one in 2024: Riize with "Boom Boom Bass" and Nmixx with "See That?".

Riize and Nmixx were among a number of acts to reach number one for the first time in 2024. In March, both Bibi and TWS reached number one for the first time with "Bam Yang Gang" and "Plot Twist", respectively. Other first-time number one artist includes Illit, whose debut single "Magnetic" reached number one on the April 21 broadcast. The single went on to rank number one for three consecutive weeks and achieved a triple crown. In September, Zerobaseone, BoyNextDoor, and Day6 won their first ever Inkigayo trophy with their singles "Good So Bad", "Nice Guy", and "Happy", respectively. Finally, "APT." helped American singer-songwriter Bruno Mars rank number one for the first time on the October 27 broadcast. The single went on to achieve a triple crown.

== Chart history ==
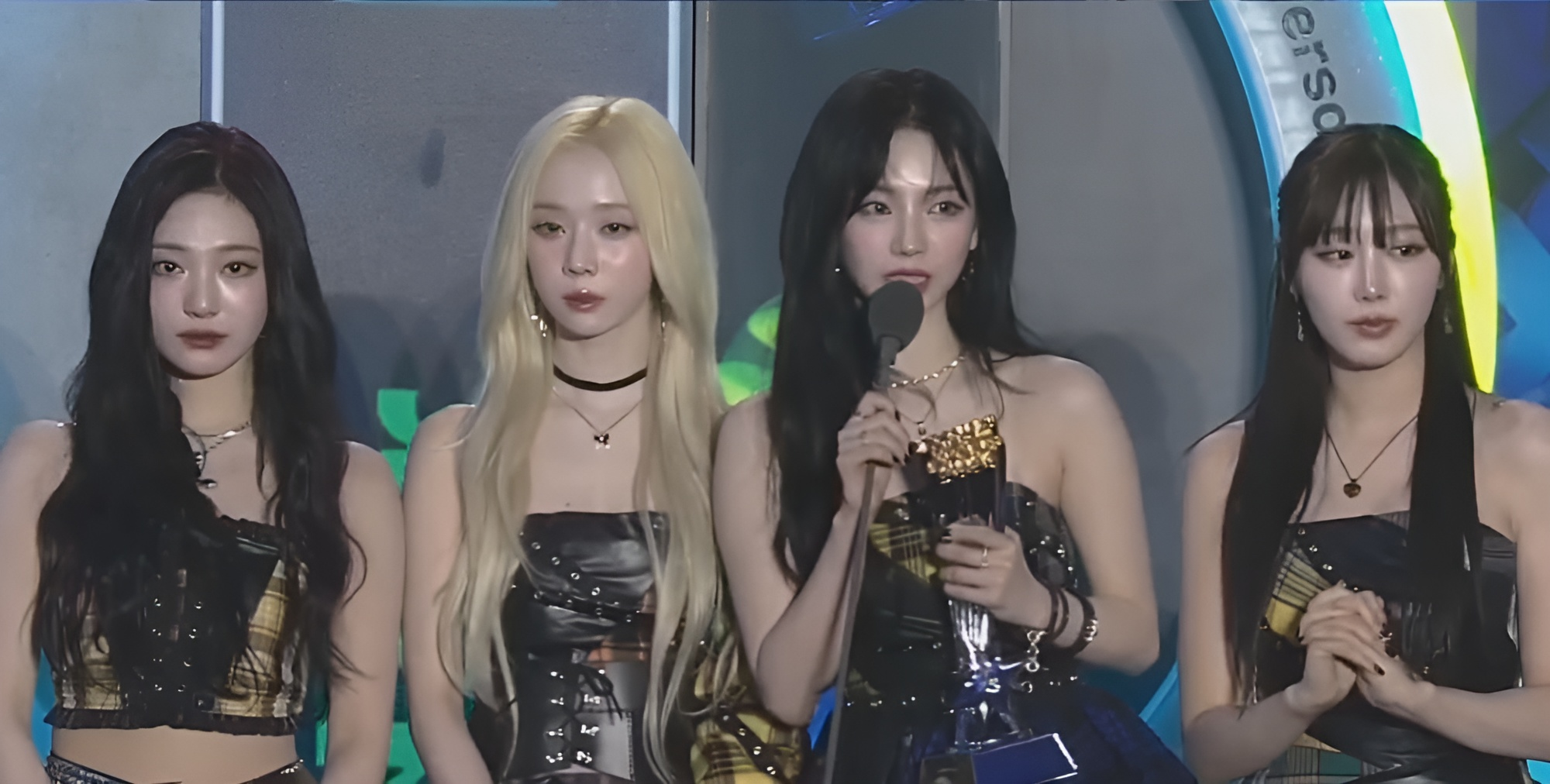
Aespa had three number one singles on the chart in 2024, achieved with "Drama", "Supernova" and "Whiplash". All three singles went on to achieve triple crowns. They spent a total of eight weeks atop the chart making them the artist with the most weeks at number one in 2024.

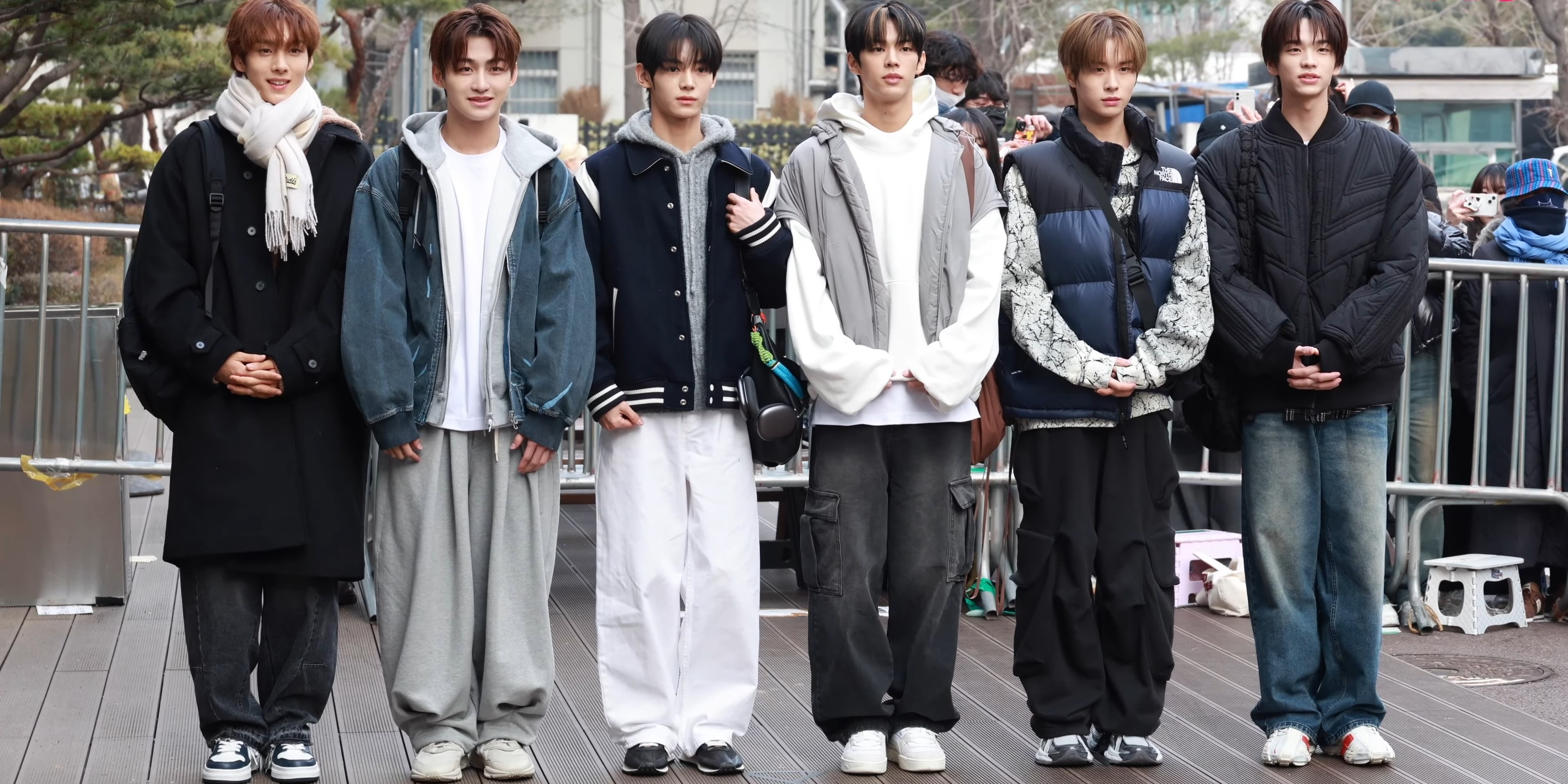
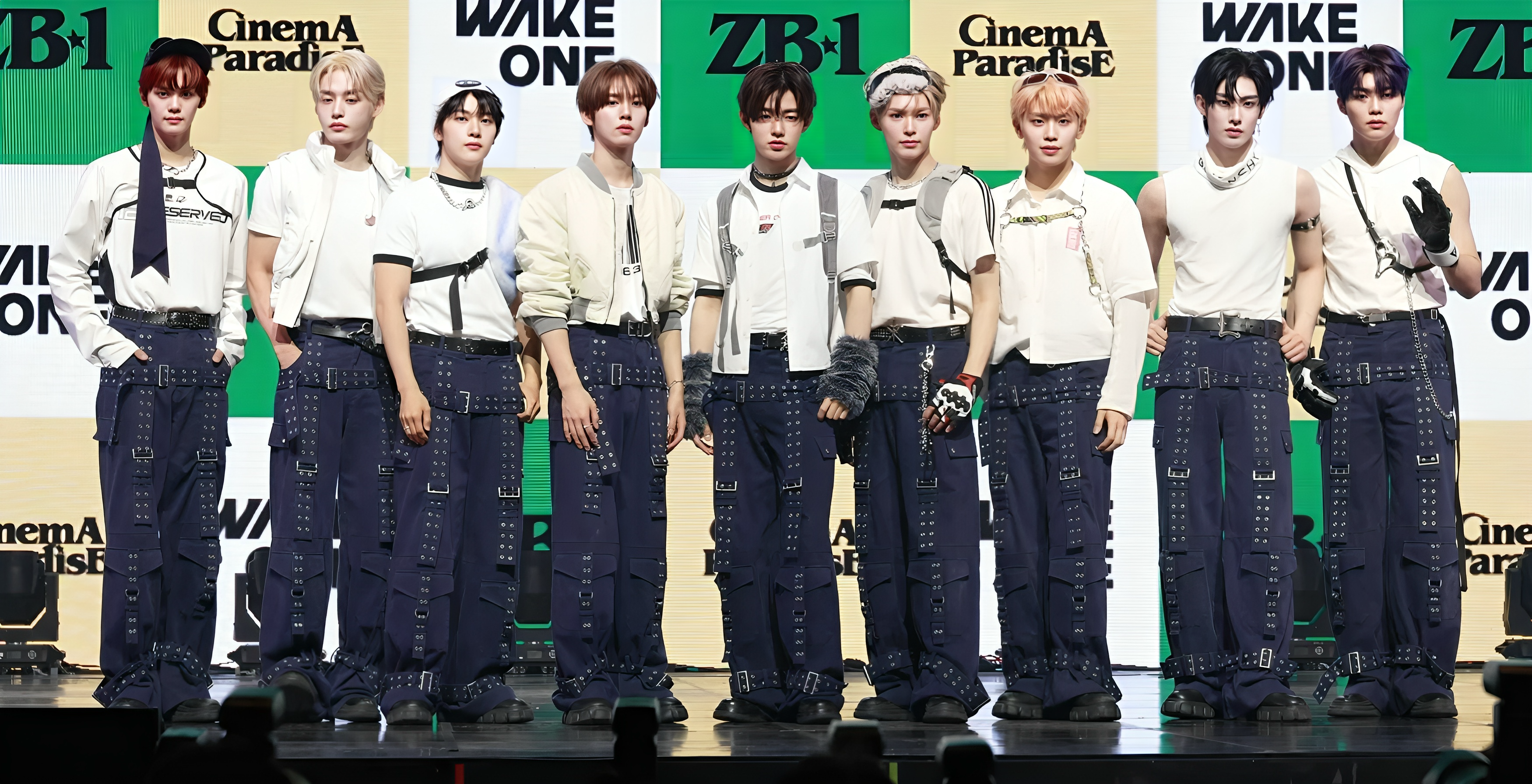
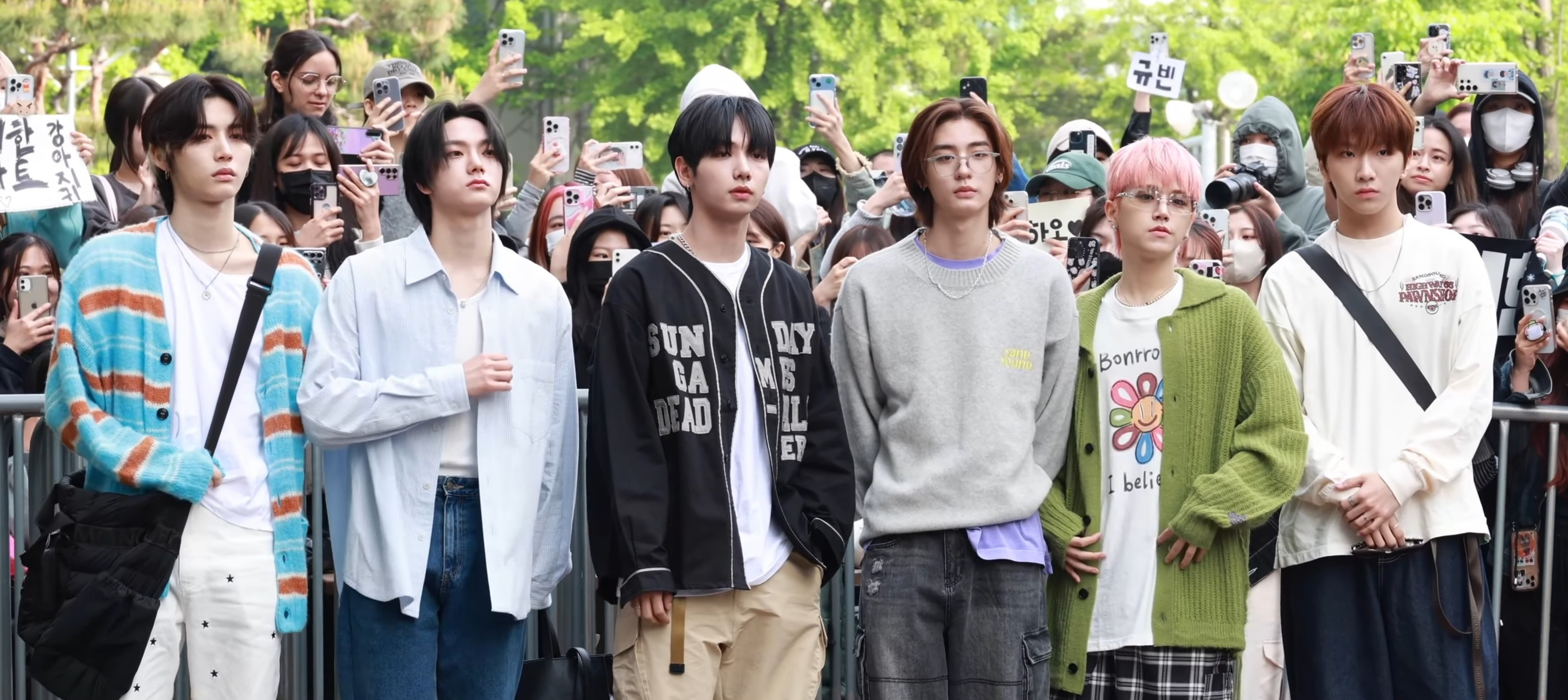
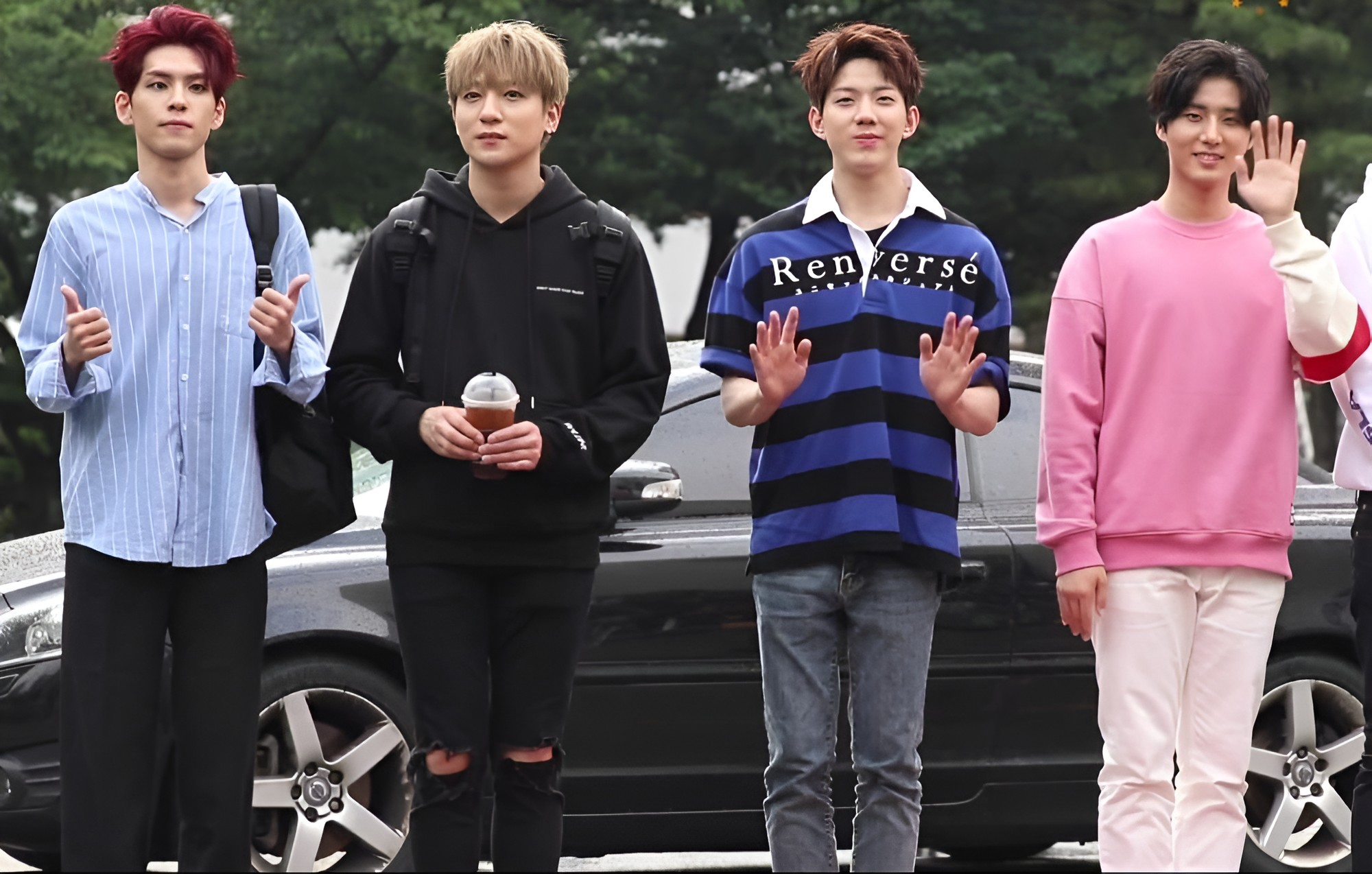
Four boy groups received their first major broadcast music show wins on Inkigayo in 2024 (from top to bottom): TWS, Zerobaseone, BoyNextDoor, and Day6.

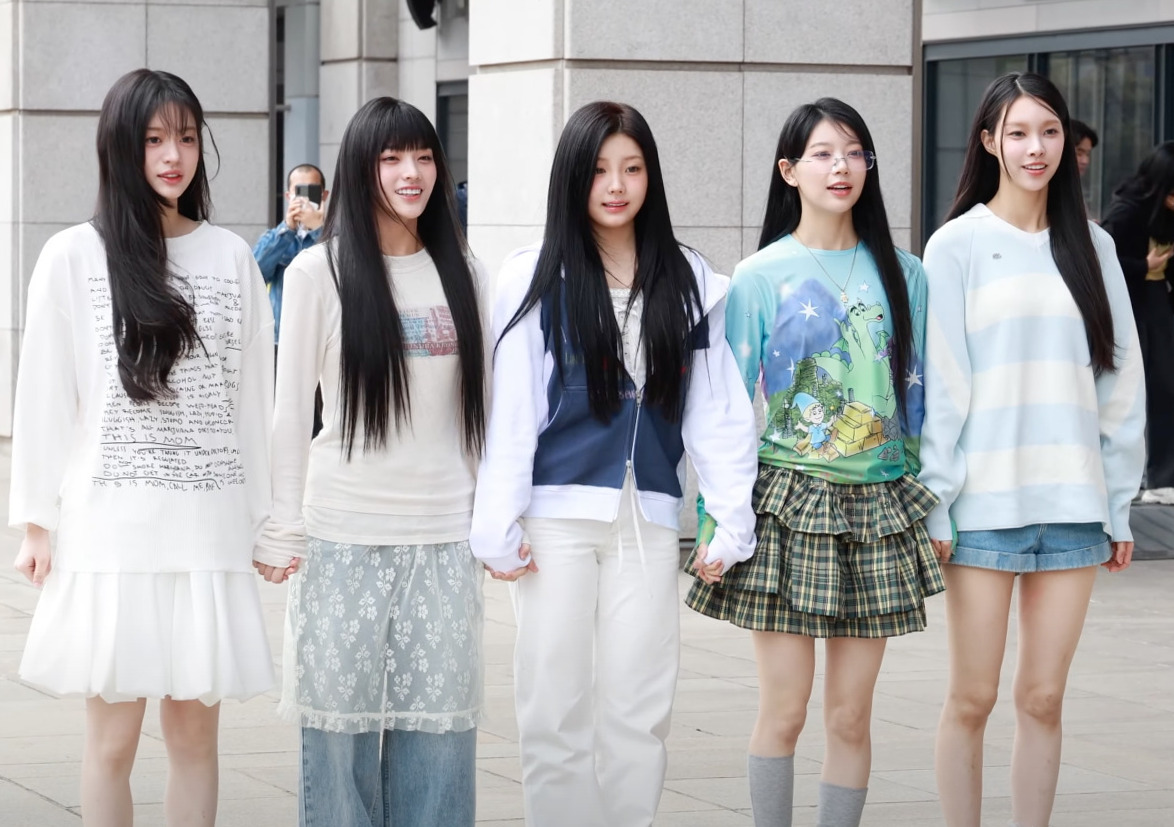
Girl group Illit had their first number one and triple crown on Inkigayo with their debut single "Magnetic".

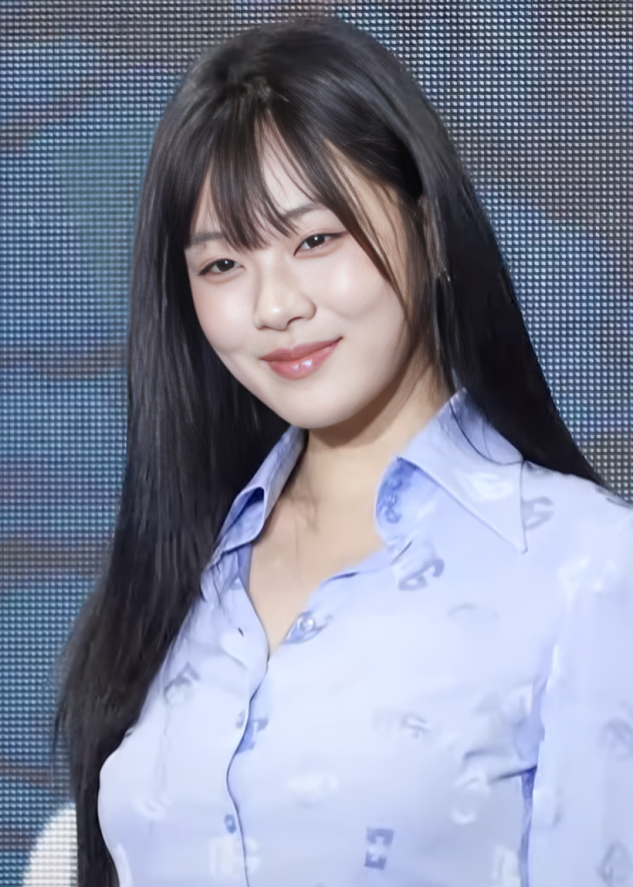
Bibi had her first number one on the chart on the March 17 broadcast with her single "Bam Yang Gang".

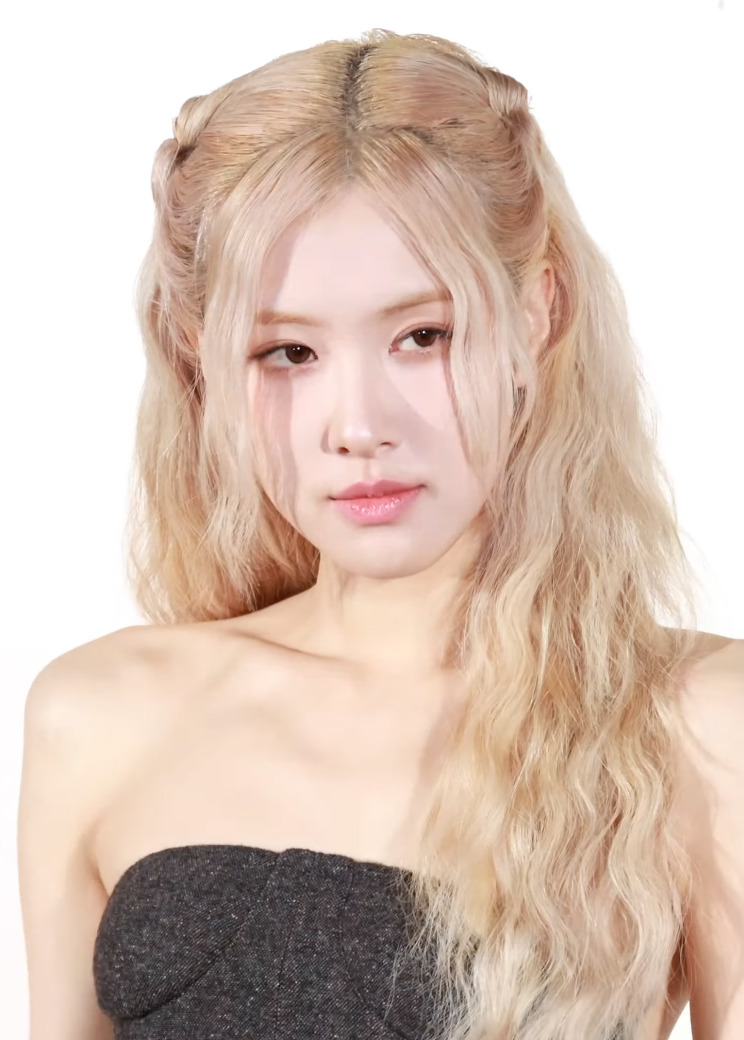
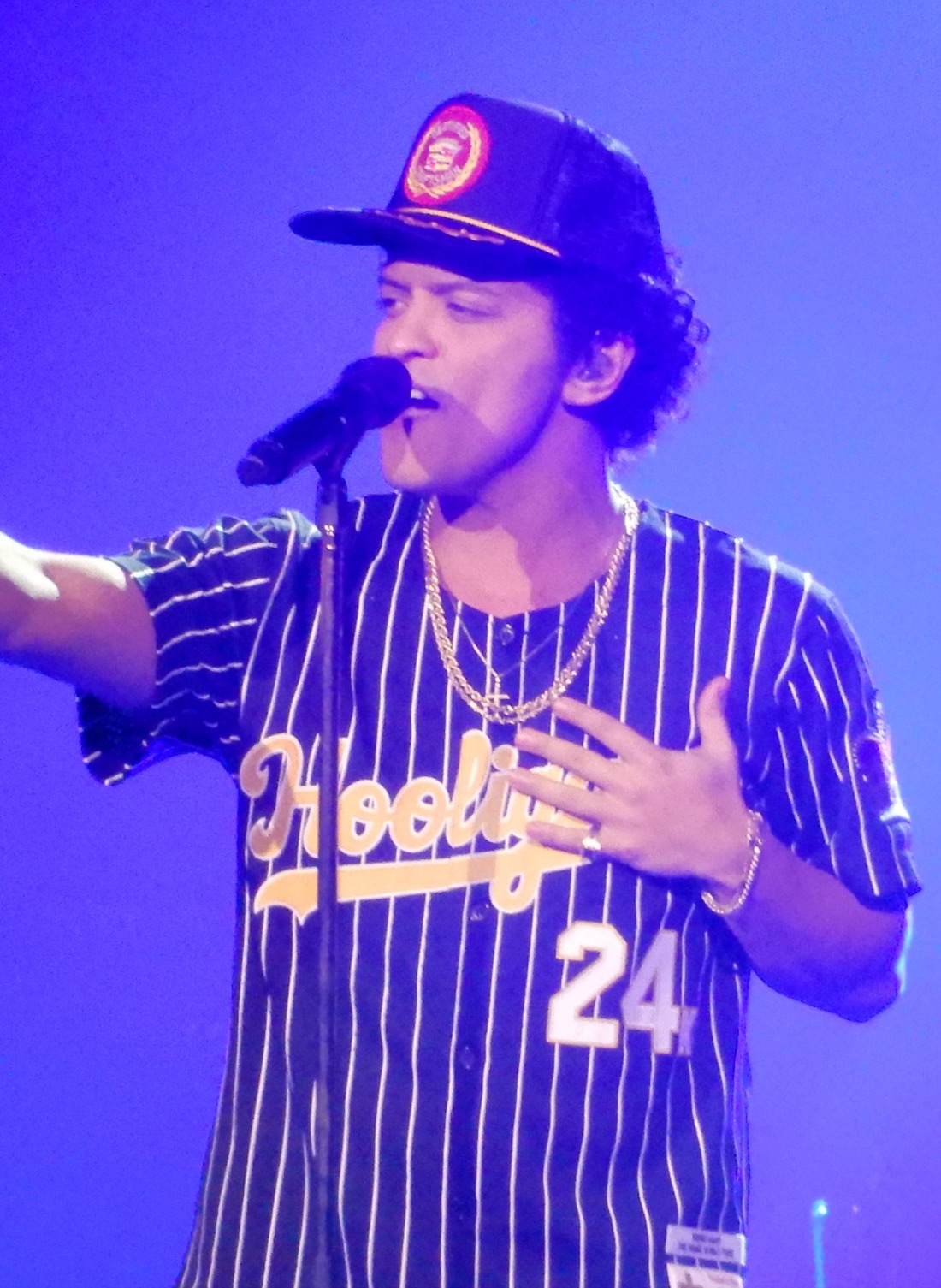
Rosé (left) and Bruno Mars (right) earned their first triple crown and the latter his first number one for "APT.".

Key
†	Indicates the song achieved a Triple Crown
‡	Indicates the highest score of the year
—	No show was held

Chart history
Episode	Date	Artist	Song	Points	Ref.
1,210	January 7	Aespa	"Drama" † (Note: "Drama" ranked number one for one week in 2023.)	7,605	
1,211	January 14	Aespa	"Drama" †	7,330	
1,212	January 21	Riize	"Love 119"	6,167	
1,213	January 28	Nmixx	"Dash"	5,901	
1,214	February 4	IU	"Love Wins All" †	8,808 ‡	
—	February 11	No show, winner not announced			
1,215	February 18	IU	"Love Wins All" †	8,596	
1,216	February 25	IU	"Love Wins All" †	7,692	
1,217	March 3	Le Sserafim	"Easy"	7,400	
1,218	March 10	Le Sserafim	"Easy"	7,148	
1,219	March 17	Bibi	"Bam Yang Gang"	6,729	
1,220	March 24	TWS	"Plot Twist"	6,414	
1,221	March 31	(G)I-dle	"Fate" †	6,119	
1,222	April 7	(G)I-dle	"Fate" †	6,104	
1,223	April 14	(G)I-dle	"Fate" †	6,056	
1,224	April 21	Illit	"Magnetic" †	7,545	
1,225	April 28	Illit	"Magnetic" †	6,306	
1,226	May 5	Illit	"Magnetic" †	6,640	
1,227	May 12	Zico	"Spot!"	6,861	
1,228	May 19	Zico	"Spot!"	7,968	
1,229	May 26	Aespa	"Supernova" †	6,807	
—	June 2	No show, winner not announced			
—	June 9	No show, winner not announced			
1,230	June 16	Aespa	"Supernova" †	8,411	
1,231	June 23	Aespa	"Supernova" †	7,007	
1,232	June 30	Riize	"Boom Boom Bass"	6,353	
1,233	July 7	Lee Young-ji	"Small Girl"	7,227	
1,234	July 14	Lee Young-ji	"Small Girl"	6,150	
—	July 21	No show, winner not announced (Note: This week's episode was cancelled due to the 2024 Summer Olympics.)			
—	July 28	No show, winner not announced			
—	August 4	No show, winner not announced			
1,235	August 11	(G)I-dle	"Klaxon" †	6,883	
1,236	August 18	(G)I-dle	"Klaxon" †	6,862	
1,237	August 25	(G)I-dle	"Klaxon" †	6,737	
1,238	September 1	Nmixx	"See That?"	6,591	
1,239	September 8	Zerobaseone	"Good So Bad"	5,739	
—	September 15	No show, winner not announced			
1,240	September 22	BoyNextDoor	"Nice Guy"	6,371	
1,241	September 29	Day6	"Happy"	6,380	
1,242	October 6	Day6	"Happy"	4,428	
—	October 13	No show, winner not announced			
—	October 20	No show, winner not announced			
1,243	October 27	Rosé and Bruno Mars	"APT." †	5,198	
1,244	November 3	Rosé and Bruno Mars	"APT." †	7,460	
1,245	November 10	Rosé and Bruno Mars	"APT." †	7,407	
1,246	November 17	Aespa	"Whiplash" †	5,705	
1,247	November 24	Aespa	"Whiplash" †	5,690	
1,248	December 1	Aespa	"Whiplash" †	5,872	
—	December 8	No show, winner not announced			
1,249	December 15	G-Dragon	"Home Sweet Home" † (Note: "Home Sweet Home" ranked number one for two weeks in 2025.)	5,984	
—	December 22	No show, winner not announced			
—	December 29	No show, winner not announced			

== See also ==
- List of M Countdown Chart winners (2024)
- List of Music Bank Chart winners (2024)
- List of Show Champion Chart winners (2024)
- List of Show! Music Core Chart winners (2024)
- List of The Show Chart winners (2024)
