= List of Show Champion Chart winners (2024) =

Show Champion Chart winners (2024)

The Show Champion Chart is a record chart on the South Korean MBC M television music program Show Champion. Every week, the show awards the best-performing single on the chart in the country during its live broadcast.

In 2024, 36 singles reached number one on the chart and 27 acts have been awarded a first-place trophy. "Chk Chk Boom" by Stray Kids is the only song to achieved a triple crown.

== Chart history ==
Key
	Indicates a Triple Crown
	Highest score of the year
—	No show was held

Episode	Date	Artist	Song	Points	Ref.
—	January 3	No Broadcast or Winner			
—	January 10	No Broadcast or Winner			
—	January 17	No Broadcast or Winner			
502	January 24	Nmixx	"Dash"	6,849	
503	January 31	Evnne	"Ugly"	4,802	
504	February 7	(G)I-dle	"Super Lady"	6,964	
505	February 14	TWS	"Plot Twist"	5,537	
506	February 21	TWS	"Plot Twist"	5,384	
507	February 28	Le Sserafim	"Easy"	4,261	
508	March 6	Plave	"Way 4 Luv"	4,462	
509	March 13	NCT Wish	"Wish" (Korean ver.)	3,891	
510	March 20	Tempest	"Lighthouse"	5,861	
511	March 27	The Boyz	"Nectar"	5,025	
512	April 3	NCT Dream	"Smoothie"	7,210	
513	April 10	Tomorrow X Together	"Deja Vu"	4,476	
514	April 17	Illit	"Magnetic"	4,188	
515	April 24	BoyNextDoor	"Earth, Wind & Fire"	7,009	
516	May 1	Doyoung	"Little Light"	5,116	
517	May 8	Seventeen	"Maestro"	5,988	
—	May 15	No Broadcast or Winner			
518	May 22	Zerobaseone	"Feel the Pop"	5,858	
519	May 29	NewJeans	"How Sweet"	5,759	
520	June 5	Aespa	"Armageddon"	4,611	
521	June 12	Kep1er	"Shooting Star"	5,049	
522	June 19	Nayeon	"ABCD"	4,644	
523	June 26	Riize	"Boom Boom Bass"	8,098	
524	July 4	TWS	"If I'm S, Can You Be My N?"	7,139	
525	July 10	NCT Wish	"Songbird" (Korean ver.)	4,779	
526	July 17	Kiss of Life	"Sticky"	4,720	
—	July 24	No Broadcast or Winner			
527	July 31	Stray Kids	"Chk Chk Boom"	5,858	
528	August 7	Stray Kids	"Chk Chk Boom"	6,998	
529	August 14	Stray Kids	"Chk Chk Boom"	7,142	
—	August 21	No Broadcast or Winner			
530	August 28	Special episode, winner not announced			
531	September 4	Zerobaseone	"Good So Bad"	5,794	
532	September 11	Le Sserafim	"Crazy"	4,777	
533	September 18	No Winner (Note: Highlight episode.)			
534	September 25	P1Harmony	"Sad Song"	6,219	
535	October 2	Kang Daniel	"Electric Shock"	4,634	
536	October 9	QWER	"My Name is Malgeum"	5,156	
—	October 16	No Broadcast or Winner			
537	October 23	Seventeen	"Love, Money, Fame"	6,448	
538	October 30	Aespa	"Whiplash"	6,243	
539	November 6	The Boyz	"Trigger"	4,878	
540	November 13	Tomorrow X Together	"Over the Moon"	4,992	
541	November 20	NCT Dream	"When I'm With You"	7,169	
—	November 27	No Broadcast or Winner			
542	December 4	WayV	"Frequency" (Korean Ver.)	4,859	
—	December 11	No Broadcast or Winner			
—	December 18	No Broadcast or Winner			
—	December 25	No Broadcast or Winner			

== See also ==
- List of Inkigayo Chart winners (2024)
- List of M Countdown Chart winners (2024)
- List of Music Bank Chart winners (2024)
- List of Show! Music Core Chart winners (2024)
- List of The Show Chart winners (2024)
