= List of The Show Chart winners (2024) =

The Show Chart winners (2024)

The Show Chart is a music program record chart on SBS M that gives an award to the best-performing single of the week in South Korea.

In 2024, 23 songs placed number one on the chart and 18 acts have been awarded a first-place trophy.

== Chart history ==
Key
	Triple Crown
	Highest score in 2024
—	No show was held

Episode	Date	Artist	Song	Points	Ref.
—	January 2	No Broadcast or Winner			
—	January 9	No Broadcast or Winner			
—	January 16	No Broadcast or Winner			
—	January 23	No Broadcast or Winner			
—	January 30	No Broadcast or Winner			
—	February 6	No Broadcast or Winner			
—	February 13	No Broadcast or Winner			
343	February 20	TWS	"Plot Twist"	5,876	
—	February 27	No Broadcast or Winner			
344	March 5	Cravity	"Love or Die"	9,330	
345	March 12	NCT Wish	"Wish"	7,241	
346	March 19	Highlight	"Body"	8,810	
— (Note: Highlight episode)	March 26	No Winner			
347	April 2	Illit	"Magnetic"	6,904	
348	April 9	Illit	"Magnetic"	8,990	
349	April 16	ONF	"Bye My Monster"	7,490	
350	April 23	BoyNextDoor	"Earth, Wind & Fire"	9,200	
—	April 30	No Broadcast or Winner			
351	May 7	Solar	"But I"	7,270	
352	May 14	TripleS	"Girls Never Die"	7,200	
353	May 21	Zerobaseone	"Feel the Pop"	8,750	
354	May 28	Zerobaseone	"Feel the Pop"	7,430	
355	June 4	Ateez	"Work"	9,380	
356	June 11	WayV	"Give Me That"	7,270	
—	June 18	No Broadcast or Winner			
357	June 25	Riize	"Boom Boom Bass"	9,320	
358	July 2	TWS	"If I'm S, Can You Be My N?"	9,480	
359	July 9	Kiss of Life	"Sticky"	7,900	
—	July 16	No Broadcast or Winner			
—	July 23	No Broadcast or Winner			
—	July 30	No Winner			
360	August 6	Special episode, winner not announced (Note: The Show Fanfest)			
—	August 13	No Broadcast or Winner			
361	August 20	Fromis 9	"Supersonic"	9,210	
362	August 27	SF9	"Don't Worry, Be Happy"	7,190	
363	September 3	Zerobaseone	"Good So Bad"	9,350	
—	September 10	No Broadcast or Winner			
—	September 17	No Broadcast or Winner			
364	September 24	P1Harmony	"Sad Song"	7,049	
—	October 1	No Broadcast or Winner			
—	October 8	No Broadcast or Winner			
365	October 15	Special episode, winner not announced			
—	October 22	No Broadcast or Winner			
366	October 29	Kiss of Life	"Get Loud"	6,552	
367	November 5	TripleS (Note: Credited under TripleS but is a unit track performed by TripleS Visionary Vision.)	"Hit the Floor"	6,900	
368	November 12	Kep1er	"Tipi-tap"	7,680	
—	November 19	No Broadcast or Winner			
—	November 26	No Broadcast or Winner			
369	December 3	WayV	"Frequency"	7,920	
—	December 10	No Broadcast or Winner			
—	December 17	No Broadcast or Winner			
—	December 24	No Broadcast or Winner			
—	December 31	No Broadcast or Winner			

== See also ==
- List of Inkigayo Chart winners (2024)
- List of M Countdown Chart winners (2024)
- List of Music Bank Chart winners (2024)
- List of Show Champion Chart winners (2024)
- List of Show! Music Core Chart winners (2024)
