= MAMA Award for Best Choreography =

South Korean annual award

Mnet Asian Music Award for Best Choreography
- Awarded for: Quality choreography performances
- Country: South Korea
- Presented by: CJ E&M Pictures (Mnet)
- First award: 2024
- Currently held by: Aespa – "Whiplash" (2025)
- Website: MAMA Awards

The Mnet Asian Music Award for Best Choreography is an award presented annually by CJ E&M Pictures (Mnet). It was first awarded at the 2024 MAMA Awards, where Aespa' won the award for their song "Supernova". The award is given in honor for the artists with the most artistic achievement in choreography performances in the music industry.

== Winners and nominees ==
Year	Performing artists	Work	Nominees	Ref.
2024	Aespa	"Supernova"	Illit – "Magnetic"; Le Sserafim – "Crazy"; NewJeans – "Supernatural"; Riize – "Impossible"; Taemin – "Guilty"	
2025	Aespa	"Whiplash"	AllDay Project – "Wicked"; Cortis – "Go!"; G-Dragon – "Too Bad" (feat. Anderson .Paak); Jennie – "Like Jennie"	

== Multiple awards ==
2 awards

- Aespa
