= Whiplash (Aespa song) =

- English version cover

Single by Aespa

from the EP Whiplash
- Language: Korean; English
- Released: October 21, 2024
- Genre: EDM; house
- Length: 3:03
- Label: SM; Kakao
- Composers: Marcus "MarcLo" Lomax; Neil Ormandy; Rosina "Soaky Siren" Russell; Lewis Jankel
- Lyricist: Leslie

Aespa singles chronology
"Hot Mess" (2024)	"Whiplash" (2024)	"Dirty Work" (2025)

Music video
- "Whiplash" on YouTube

"Whiplash" is a song recorded by South Korean girl group Aespa for their fifth extended play of the same name. It was released as the EP's lead single by SM Entertainment on October 21, 2024.

== Background and release ==
On September 23, 2024, SM Entertainment announced that Aespa would be releasing their fifth extended play titled Whiplash with the lead single of the same name on October 21. On October 11, the track listing was released alongside the highlight medley teaser video. Nine days later, the music video teaser was released. The song was released alongside its music video and the extended play on October 21.

On March 27, 2025, Aespa released an English-language version of "Whiplash", expanding the track's global appeal. Alongside the new version, a remix produced by American DJ Steve Aoki was also made available. The remix reimagined the original's energetic, house-influenced sound into Aoki's signature electronic style. The English release was part of SM Entertainment's efforts to bolster Aespa's presence in Western markets, building on the track's earlier success across various global music charts.

== Composition ==
"Whiplash" was written by Leslie from XYXX, composed and arranged by Neil Ormandy and Lewis Jankel with Marcus "MarcLo" Lomax and Rosina "Soaky Siren" Russell participating in the composition. It was described as an EDM-based song featuring "strong and fast-paced bass and house beats" with lyrics about "moving forward without hesitation with your own standards and criteria without being confined by a frame".

== Commercial performance ==
"Whiplash" debuted at number four on South Korea's Circle Digital Chart in the chart issue dated October 20–26, 2024. The song also debuted at number seven on the Billboard South Korea Songs in the chart issue dated November 2, 2024. In Japan, the song debuted at number 13 on the Billboard Japan Hot 100 in the chart issue dated October 30, 2024. On the Oricon Combined Singles Chart, the song debuted at number 15 in the chart issue dated November 4, 2024.

In Singapore, "Whiplash" debuted at number 19 on the RIAS Top Streaming Chart, and number six on the RIAS Top Regional Chart in the chart issue dated October 18–24, 2024. The song also debuted at number 19 on the Billboard Singapore Songs in the chart issue dated November 2, 2024. In Malaysia, the song debuted at number 23 on the Billboard Malaysia Songs in the chart issue dated November 2, 2024. In Hong Kong, the song debuted at number eight on the Billboard Hong Kong Songs in the chart issue dated November 2, 2024. In Taiwan, the song debuted at number six on the Billboard Taiwan Songs in the chart issue dated November 2, 2024.

In New Zealand, "Whiplash" debuted at number 12 on the RMNZ Hot Singles in the chart issue dated October 28, 2024. In United Kingdom, the song debuted at number 14 on the OCC's UK Indie Breakers, number 37 on the UK Singles Downloads Chart, and number 40 on the UK Singles Sales Chart in the chart issue dated October 25–31, 2024. Globally, the song debuted at number 30 on the Billboard Global 200, and number 18 on the Billboard Global Excl. U.S in the chart issue dated November 2, 2024.

== Promotion ==
Prior to the release of Whiplash, on October 21, 2024, Aespa held a live event on YouTube, TikTok, and Weverse, aimed at introducing the extended play and its songs, including "Whiplash", and connecting with their fanbase. They subsequently performed the song at three music programs in the first week of promotion: Mnet's M Countdown on October 24, MBC's Show! Music Core on October 26, and SBS's Inkigayo on October 27. In the second and final week of promotion, they performed on two music programs: KBS's Music Bank on November 1 where they won the first place, and Show! Music Core on November 2.

== Accolades ==
Awards and nominations for "Whiplash"
Award ceremony	Year	Category	Result	Ref.
Korea Grand Music Awards	2025	Best Streaming Song	Won	
MAMA Awards	2025	Best Choreography	Won	
MAMA Awards	2025	Best Dance Performance – Female Group	Won	
MAMA Awards	2025	Song of the Year	Shortlisted	
MTV Video Music Awards	2025	Best K-Pop	Nominated	
MTV Video Music Awards Japan	2025	Best Group Video (International)	Won	
MTV Video Music Awards Japan	2025	Video of the Year	Nominated	
Music Awards Japan	2025	Best K-pop Song in Japan	Nominated	
Music Awards Japan	2025	Best of Listeners' Choice: International Song	Nominated	
Tencent Music Entertainment Awards	2024	K-pop Song of the Year	Won	

Music program awards for "Whiplash"
Program	Date	Ref.
Inkigayo	November 17, 2024	
Inkigayo	November 24, 2024	
Inkigayo	December 1, 2024	
Music Bank	November 1, 2024	
Show Champion	October 30, 2024	
Show! Music Core	November 30, 2024	

=== Listicles ===
==== Year-end lists ====
Name of publisher, year listed, name of listicle, and placement
Publisher	Year	Listicle	Placement	Ref.
Idology	2024	16 Best Songs of 2024	Placed	
Idology	2024	Best Music Videos of 2024	Placed	
Teen Vogue	2024	15 Best K-pop Music Videos of 2024	Placed	

== Track listing ==
Digital download and streaming – English version

1. "Whiplash" (English version) – 3:03
2. "Whiplash" (Steve Aoki remix) – 3:45
3. "Whiplash" (English version) [sped up version] – 2:41

Digital download and streaming – ScreaM Rookies 2 : Whiplash (Remixes)

1. "Whiplash" (SJH remix) – 2:29
2. "Whiplash" (Dante remix) – 3:02
3. "Whiplash" (Millim remix) – 6:12
4. "Whiplash" (Seto remix) – 3:03

== Credits and personnel ==
Credits adapted from liner notes of Whiplash.

Studio

- SM Dorii Studio – recording
- SM Yellow Tail Studio – recording, digital editing, engineered for mix
- SM Droplet Studio – recording
- Vibe Music Studio 606 – recording
- Sound Pool Studio – digital editing
- SM Blue Ocean Studio – mixing
- 821 Sound – mastering

Personnel

- Aespa – vocals, background vocals
- Kriz – background vocals
- Rosina "Soaky Siren" Russell – background vocals, composition
- Leslie (XYXX) – lyrics
- Marcus "MarcLo" Lomax – composition
- Neil Ormandy – composition, arrangement
- Lewis Jankel – composition, arrangement
- Maxx Song – vocal directing
- Emily Yeonseo Kim – vocal directing
- Jeong Jae-won – recording
- Noh Min-ji – recording, digital editing, engineered for mix
- Kim Joo-hyun – recording
- Kwak Jeong-shin – recording
- Jeong Ho-jin – digital editing
- Kim Cheol-sun – mixing
- Kwon Nam-woo – mastering

== Charts ==
=== Weekly charts ===
Weekly chart performance for "Whiplash"
Chart (2024)	Peak position
Argentina Hot 100 (Billboard)	92
Canada Hot 100 (Billboard)	90
Ecuador Anglo (Monitor Latino)	4
Global 200 (Billboard)	8
Hong Kong (Billboard)	3
Indonesia (ASIRI)	50
Japan (Japan Hot 100)	7
Japan Combined Singles (Oricon)	8
Malaysia (Billboard)	8
Netherlands (Global Top 40)	28
New Zealand Hot Singles (RMNZ)	12
Philippines Hot 100 (Billboard Philippines)	54
Singapore (RIAS)	7
South Korea (Circle)	2
South Korea (Korea Hot 100)	57
Taiwan (Billboard)	2
UK Indie Breakers (OCC)	14
UK Singles Downloads (Official Charts)	37
UK Singles Sales (OCC)	40

=== Monthly charts ===
Monthly chart performance for "Whiplash"
Chart (2024)	Position
South Korea (Circle)	2

=== Year-end charts ===
2024 year-end chart performance for "Whiplash"
Chart (2024)	Position
South Korea (Circle)	60
Taiwan (Hito Radio)	19

2025 year-end chart performance for "Whiplash"
Chart (2025)	Position
Global 200 (Billboard)	102
Japan (Japan Hot 100)	30
South Korea (Circle)	2

== Certifications ==
Certifications for "Whiplash"
Region	Certification	Certified units/sales
Streaming
Japan (RIAJ)	Platinum	100,000,000^{†}
South Korea (KMCA)	Platinum	100,000,000^{†}
^{†} Streaming-only figures based on certification alone.

== Release history ==
Release history for "Whiplash"
Region	Date	Format	Version	Label
Various	October 21, 2024	Digital download; streaming	Original	SM; Kakao
Various	December 11, 2024	Digital download; streaming	Monotostereo remix	SM; Kakao; ScreaM
Various	March 27, 2025	Digital download; streaming	English	SM; Kakao
Various	September 23, 2026	Digital download; streaming	Remixes	SM; Kakao; ScreaM

== See also ==
- List of Inkigayo Chart winners (2024)
- List of Music Bank Chart winners (2024)
- List of Show Champion Chart winners (2024)
- List of Show! Music Core Chart winners (2024)
