= Supernova (Aespa song) =

Single by Aespa

from the album Armageddon
- Language: Korean; English
- Released: May 13, 2024
- Genre: Dance; hyperpop
- Length: 2:59
- Label: SM; Kakao
- Composers: Kenzie; Paris Alexa; Dem Jointz
- Lyricist: Kenzie

Aespa singles chronology
"Regret of the Times" (2024)	"Supernova" (2024)	"Armageddon" (2024)

Music video
- "Supernova" on YouTube

Professional ratings
Review scores
Source	Rating
IZM	3.5/5 stars

"Supernova" is a song recorded by South Korean girl group Aespa for their first studio album, Armageddon. It was released by SM Entertainment on May 13, 2024, as the lead single from the album. Written by Kenzie, who composed the song alongside Paris Alexa and Dem Jointz, it is a dance and hyperpop song that incorporates hip-hop and EDM with lyrics comparing Aespa's expanded world view to a supernova.

The song experienced huge commercial success in South Korea, scoring a perfect all-kill and becoming the group's first song to top the Circle Digital Chart. It remained at number one for eleven non-consecutive weeks and became the best-performing single of the year. "Supernova" also topped charts in Hong Kong and entered the top ten in Egypt, Indonesia, Malaysia, Singapore, and Taiwan. It peaked at number 17 on the Billboard Global 200 and number six on the Global Excl. US, becoming their first top-ten hit on the latter chart. It received numerous accolades at year-end award ceremonies, including Song of the Year at the 2024 Korea Grand Music Awards, 2024 MAMA Awards, 2024 Melon Music Awards, 39th Golden Disc Awards and 22nd Korean Music Awards.

== Background and release ==
On April 22, 2024, SM Entertainment announced that Aespa would be releasing their first studio album, Armageddon. It was also announced that the album would feature two title tracks: "Supernova" and "Armageddon", with the former releasing on May 13 and the latter, along with the album, on May 27. On May 10, the track listing was revealed alongside a highlight medley teaser video. Two days later, the music video teaser was released. "Supernova" was released along with its music video on May 13.

On September 20, ScreaM Records released the remix version of "Supernova" by Canadian musician Grimes alongside the remixes of "Armageddon", under the 33rd volume of the series iScreaM.

== Composition ==
"Supernova" was written and composed by Kenzie and Paris Alexa, and Dem Jointz participating in both the composition and production. Alexa wrote the original song in English to Jointz beat's, and Kenzie refined and translated the lyrics into Korean to make it flow seamlessly together. Described as a dance and hyper-pop song characterized by "heavy kick and bass", "catchy top line", and "synth melody" with lyrics about "Aespa's expanded world view by comparing the beginning of an event that opens a door to another dimension to a supernova, expressing the beginning of a big explosion". "Supernova" was composed in the key of B minor, with a tempo of 120 beats per minute.

Gil Kaufman of Billboard, described the track as "the dance floor-ready" fusion of "hip-hop beats, EDM rhythms and smooth pop vocals". Uproxx's Derrick Rossignol characterized "Supernova" as a "cross-genre banger" that combines "elements of pop, dance, hip-hop, and electronic music into one cohesive package".

== Commercial performance ==
"Supernova" debuted at number eight on South Korea's Circle Digital Chart in the chart issue dated May 12–18, 2024, ascending to number one in the following week. The song also debuted on the Billboard South Korea Songs in the chart issue dated May 25, 2024, ascending to number one in the following week. The song achieved the perfect all-kill status, where a song simultaneously reaches number one on the real-time, daily, and weekly components of iChart. In Japan, the song debuted at number 26 on the Billboard Japan Hot 100 in the chart issue dated May 22, 2024, ascending to number 25 in the following week. On the Oricon Combined Singles Chart, the song debuted at number 24 in the chart issue dated May 27, 2024.

In Singapore, "Supernova" debuted at number 28 on the RIAS Top Streaming Chart and number 11 on the Top Regional Chart in the chart issue dated May 10–16, 2024, ascending to number six on the Top Streaming Chart and number two on the Top Regional Chart in the following week. In Hong Kong, the song debuted at number 15 on the Billboard Hong Kong Songs in the chart issue dated May 25, 2024, ascending to number one in the following week. In Taiwan, the song debuted at number six on the Billboard Taiwan Songs in the chart issue dated May 25, 2024, ascending to number two in the following week. In Indonesia, the song debuted at number 14 on the Billboard Indonesia Songs in the chart issue dated June 1, 2024. In Malaysia, the song debuted at number ten on the Billboard Malaysia Songs in the chart issue dated June 1, 2024.

In the United States, "Supernova" debuted at number five on the Billboard World Digital Song Sales in the chart issue dated May 25, 2024. In New Zealand, "Supernova" debuted at number 20 on the RMNZ Hot Singles in the chart issue dated May 20, 2024, ascending to number 12 in the following week. In the United Kingdom, the song debuted at number 33 on the OCC's UK Singles Download Chart, and UK Singles Sales Chart in the chart issue dated May 17–23, 2024. In Netherlands, the song debuted at number 17 on the Global Top 40 in the chart issue dated May 27, 2024. In Argentina, the song debuted at number 50 on the Billboard Argentina Hot 100 in the chart issue dated June 1, 2024. Globally, the song debuted at number 50 on the Billboard Global 200, and number 23 on the Billboard Global Excl. U.S. in the chart issue dated May 25, 2024, ascending to number 19 on the Global 200, and number seven on the Global Excl. U.S. in the following week. The song peaked at number 17 on the Global 200, and number six on the Global Excl. U.S. the following week

== Music video ==
The music video directed by Ha Junghoon (Hattrick), was released on May 13, 2024, alongside the song. On the same day, it was announced that the music video had surpassed 10 million views within 10 hours.

The "futuristic" music video shows Aespa in "dynamic and witty characterizations", displaying their superpowers throughout the city. It features each member possessing an "otherworldly power" - Karina's super strength, Ningning's control over fire, Winter's floating in the air and Giselle's time-looping. The visual starts with Karina surviving a fall from way high up onto a car. Moments later, she leaves the shattered vehicle unharmed. Other scenes include the member "ripping the side mirrors off parked cars, flashing [her] vampire fangs and lifting up vehicles with one hand".

Additionally, AI technology was used to move still photos of Aespa's faces in synergy with the lyrics of the song. Member Ningning revealed that she "laughed so much when [she] saw the AI scene", describing it as "not something you expect". The singer also realized that "even in a world where AI covers and AI-anything are so popular", the technology will not be able to "replicate our expressions and the temperatures of humans".

== Promotion ==
Following the release of "Supernova", on May 13, 2024, Aespa performed on four music programs in the first week of promotion: Mnet's M Countdown on May 16, and KBS's Music Bank on May 17, MBC's Show! Music Core on May 18, and SBS's Inkigayo on May 19. In the second and final week of promotion, they performed on four music programs: M Countdown on May 23, Music Bank on May 24, Show! Music Core on May 25, and Inkigayo on May 26, where they won first place for three appearances except Music Bank.

== Accolades ==
On South Korea music programs, "Supernova" achieved a triple crown on June 23 episode of Inkigayo in 2024.

Awards and nominations for "Supernova"
Award ceremony	Year	Category	Result	Ref.
Asia Star Entertainer Awards	2025	Song of the Year	Won	
Asian Pop Music Awards	2024	Best Dance Performance (Overseas)	Nominated	
Asian Pop Music Awards	2024	Best Arranger (Overseas) (Note: Credited for Dem Jointz)	Nominated	
Asian Pop Music Awards	2024	Best Lyricist (Overseas) (Note: Credited for Kenzie)	Nominated	
Asian Pop Music Awards	2024	Song of the Year (Overseas)	Nominated	
Asian Pop Music Awards	2024	Top 20 Songs of the Year (Overseas)	Won	
D Awards	2025	Song of the Year (Daesang)	Won	
Entop Awards (Note: The Entop Awards were created to internally select and celebrate the best cases among the numerous IPs and technological innovations presented by Kakao Entertainment as a company encompassing music, stories, and media throughout the year, as well as projects that led to the company's growth.)	2024	Best IP	Won	
Golden Disc Awards	2025	Best Digital Song (Bonsang)	Won	
Golden Disc Awards	2025	Digital Song of the Year (Daesang)	Won	
iHeartRadio Music Awards	2025	Favorite K-pop Dance Challenge	Nominated	
iHeartRadio Music Awards	2025	K-pop Song of the Year	Nominated	
K-Music and Arts Film Festival (Note: K-Music and Arts Film Festival (KMAFe), a not-for-profit, is inspired by the popularity of K-Pop and demand to host its annual music video film festival to further showcase the innovative and high-quality cinema in the world of music and film.)	2024	Best K-pop Music Video	Won	
Korea Grand Music Awards	2024	Best Song 10	Won	
Korea Grand Music Awards	2024	Grand Song (Daesang)	Won	
Korea Grand Music Awards	2024	Most Streamed Song	Won	
Korean Music Awards	2025	Best K-pop Song	Won	
Korean Music Awards	2025	Song of the Year (Daesang)	Won	
MAMA Awards	2024	Best Choreography	Won	
MAMA Awards	2024	Best Dance Performance – Female Group	Won	
MAMA Awards	2024	Song of the Year (Daesang)	Won	
Melon Music Awards	2024	Song of the Year (Daesang)	Won	
MTV Video Music Awards Japan	2025	Best Dance Video	Won	
MTV Video Music Awards Japan	2025	Video of the Year	Nominated	
Music Awards Japan	2025	Best Song Asia	Won	
Music Awards Japan	2025	Best K-pop Song in Japan	Nominated	
Music Awards Japan	2025	Best of Listeners' Choice: International Song	Nominated	
Philippine K-pop Awards	2024	Song of the Year	Won	
Tencent Music Entertainment Awards	2024	K-pop Song of the Year	Won	

Music program awards
Program	Date	Ref.
Inkigayo	May 26, 2024	
Inkigayo	June 16, 2024	
Inkigayo	June 23, 2024	
M Countdown	May 23, 2024	
M Countdown	May 30, 2024	
Music Bank	June 14, 2024	
Show! Music Core	May 25, 2024	
Show! Music Core	June 1, 2024	

Melon weekly popularity award
Award	Date	Ref.
Weekly Popularity Award	June 17, 2024	

=== Listicles ===
==== First-half lists ====
Name of publisher, year listed, name of listicle, and placement
Publisher	Year	Listicle	Placement	Ref.
Billboard	2024	The 20 Best K-Pop Songs of 2024 (So Far): Critic's Picks	2nd	
Dork	2024	Dork's Best Songs of 2024 (So Far)	Placed	
NME	2024	The 15 best K-pop songs of 2024 – so far	Placed	

==== Year-end lists ====
Name of publisher, year listed, name of listicle, and placement
Publisher	Year	Listicle	Placement	Ref.
Billboard	2024	The 25 Best K-Pop Songs of 2024: Staff Picks	1	
Dazed	2024	The 50 best K-pop tracks of 2024	Placed	
Idology	2024	16 Best Songs of 2024	Placed	
Idology	2024	Best Music Videos of 2024	Placed	
IZM	2024	2024 Domestic Single of the Year	Placed	
NME	2024	The 50 Best Songs of 2024	9	
NME	2024	The 25 Best K-pop Songs of 2024	1	
Paste	2024	The 20 Best K-Pop Songs of 2024	9	
Rolling Stone India	2024	10 Best K-pop Songs of 2024	Placed	
Stereogum	2024	The Top 40 Pop Songs Of 2024	7	

== Track listing ==
Digital download and streaming

1. "Supernova" – 2:58

Digital download and streaming – iScreaM Vol.33: Supernova / Armageddon Remixes

1. "Supernova" (Grimes remix) – 3:47
2. "Armageddon" (Flava D remix) – 4:07
3. "Armageddon" (2Spade remix) – 3:08
4. "Armageddon" (Mount XLR remix) – 3:16
5. "Supernova" – 2:58
6. "Armageddon" – 3:16

Digital download and streaming – Re:Works

1. "Supernova" (Kenzie Re:Works) – 3:32
2. "Supernova" – 2:58

== Credits and personnel ==
Credits adapted from the album's liner notes.

Studio

- SM Wavelet Studio – recording
- SM Yellow Tail Studio – digital editing
- SM Blue Ocean Studio – mixing
- 821 Sound – mastering

Personnel

- SM Entertainment – executive producer
- Aespa – vocals, background vocals
- Kenzie – lyrics, composition, vocal directing
- Paris Alexa – composition, lyrics, background vocals
- Dem Jointz – composition, arrangement
- Noh Min-ji – recording, digital editing
- Kang Eun-ji – recording
- Kim Cheol-sun – mixing
- Kwon Nam-woo – mastering

== Charts ==
=== Weekly charts ===
Weekly chart performance for "Supernova"
Chart (2024)	Peak position
Argentina (Argentina Hot 100)	50
Egypt (IFPI)	5
Global 200 (Billboard)	17
Hong Kong (Billboard)	1
Indonesia (ASIRI)	11
Indonesia (Billboard)	10
Japan (Japan Hot 100)	25
Japan Combined Singles (Oricon)	24
Malaysia (Billboard)	6
Malaysia International (RIM)	5
Netherlands (Global Top 40)	17
New Zealand Hot Singles (RMNZ)	12
Nigeria Bubbling Under Top 100 (TurnTable Top 100)	4
Nigeria Streaming (TurnTable Top 100)	87
Singapore (RIAS)	6
South Korea (Circle)	1
Taiwan (Billboard)	2
UK Singles Downloads (Official Charts)	33
UK Singles Sales (OCC)	33
US World Digital Song Sales (Billboard)	5

=== Monthly charts ===
Monthly chart performance for "Supernova"
Chart (2024)	Position
South Korea (Circle)	1

=== Year-end charts ===
Year-end chart performance for "Supernova"
Chart (2024)	Position
Global 200 (Billboard)	139
Japan (Japan Hot 100)	99
South Korea (Circle)	1

Year-end chart performance for "Supernova"
Chart (2025)	Position
South Korea (Circle)	20

== Certifications ==
Certifications for "Supernova"
Region	Certification	Certified units/sales
Brazil (Pro-Música Brasil)	Platinum	40,000^{‡}
Streaming
Japan (RIAJ)	Platinum	100,000,000^{†}
South Korea (KMCA)	Platinum	100,000,000^{†}
^{‡} Sales+streaming figures based on certification alone.^{†} Streaming-only figures based on certification alone.

== Release history ==
Release history for "Supernova"
Region	Date	Format	Version	Label
Various	May 13, 2024	Digital download; streaming	Original	SM; Kakao
Various	September 20, 2024	Digital download; streaming	Grimes remix	ScreaM; SM; Kakao
Various	October 7, 2024	Digital download; streaming	Re:Works	ScreaM; SM; Kakao

== See also ==
- List of Circle Digital Chart number ones of 2024
- List of Inkigayo Chart winners (2024)
- List of M Countdown Chart winners (2024)
- List of Music Bank Chart winners (2024)
- List of Show! Music Core Chart winners (2024)
