= List of Aespa live performances =

Aespa live performances
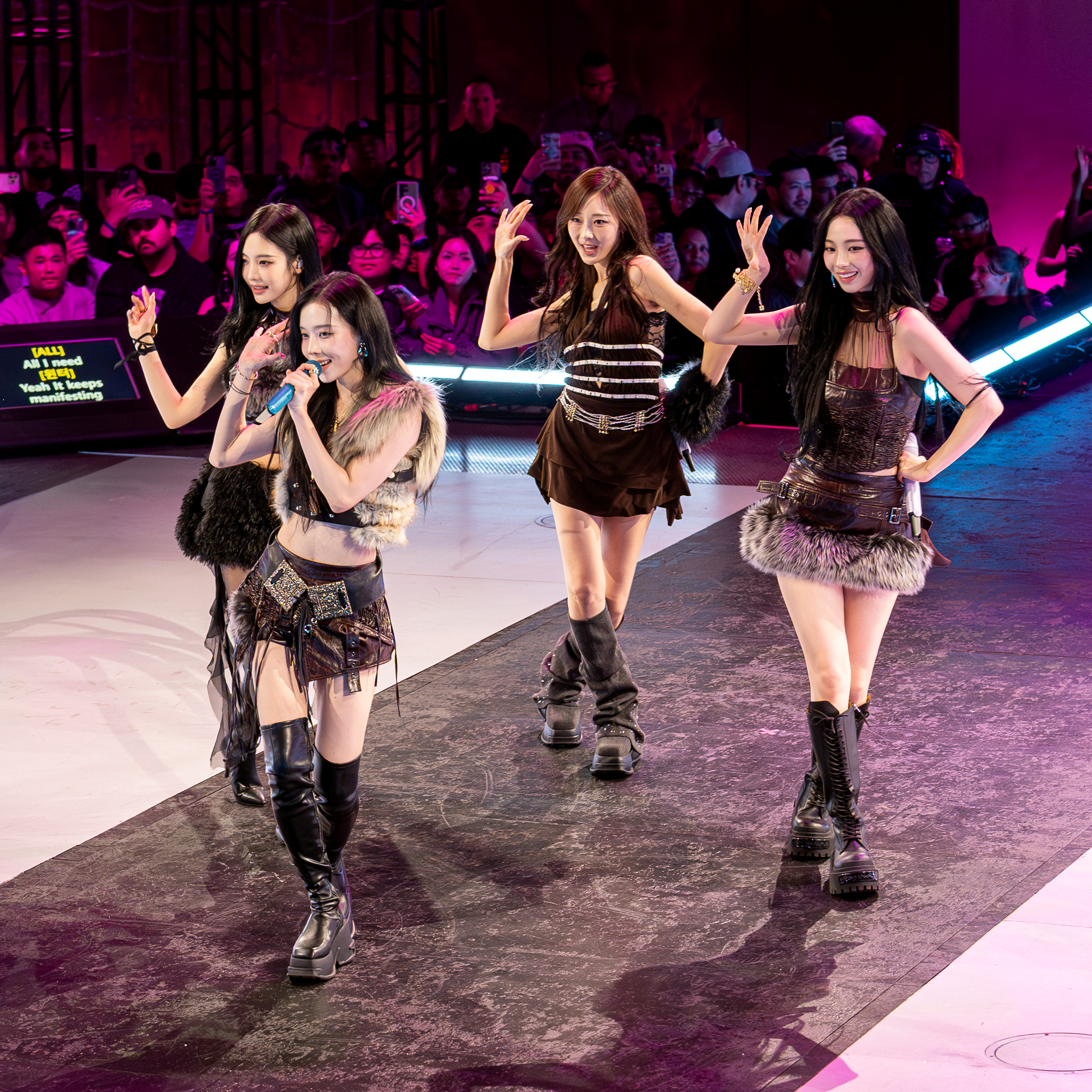
- Aespa performing in 2025
- Concert tours: 4
- Fan meetings: 5
- Showcases: 1

Aespa is a South Korean idol girl group who has staged two concert tours since their debut in 2020. To promote their debut song, "Black Mamba", they appeared on numerous South Korean music shows in November 2020. In June 2022, the group held their first showcase, titled Synk, in Los Angeles, United States and Tokyo, Japan in August 2022.

Following the release of their first two EPs, Savage (2021) and Girls (2022), Aespa launched their first world tour, Synk: Hyper Line in 2023. After releasing their first full-length album, Armageddon, they embarked on their second world tour, Synk: Parallel Line, which took place from 2024 to 2025. To promote their sixth extended play Rich Man, they launched their third headlining tour across Asia, Synk: Aexis Line, which ran from August 2025 to April 2026. Following the release of their second full-length album Lemonade in May 2026, they announced their fourth headlining tour, Synk: Complaexity.

== Concert tours ==
List of concert tours, showing dates, associated album(s), number of shows, and relevant statistics
| Title | Dates | Associated album(s) | Continent(s) | Shows | Attendance | Ref. |
|---|---|---|---|---|---|---|
| Synk: Hyper Line | February 25, 2023 – September 30, 2023 | Savage; Girls; My World | Asia; North America; South America; Europe | 31 | 256,000 (Note: 20/31 shows) | |
| Synk: Parallel Line | June 29, 2024 – March 16, 2025 | Armageddon; Whiplash | Asia; North America; Oceania; Europe | 43 | 454,000 (Note: 38/43 shows) | |
| Synk: Aexis Line | August 29, 2025 – April 26, 2026 | Rich Man | Asia | 25 | 336,000 (Note: 20/25 shows) | |
| Synk: Complaexity | August 7, 2026 – April 4, 2027 | Lemonade; Kiss n Tell | Asia; North America; South America; Europe | 30 | TBA | |

== Fan meetings ==
List of fan meetings, showing dates, location, and relevant statistics
| Title | Dates | Venue | City | Country | Ref(s) |
|---|---|---|---|---|---|
| My Synk. Aespa | July 30, 2022 | SK Olympic Handball Gymnasium | Seoul | South Korea | |
| My Drama | November 17, 2023 | Kyung Hee University Grand Peace Palace | Seoul | South Korea | |
| To My World | May 24 – 25, 2025 | Pia Arena MM | Yokohama | Japan | |
| My Classmaete | July 18 – 20, 2026 | Keio Arena Tokyo | Tokyo | Japan | |
| My 보고싶다 ae가 | November 28 – 29, 2026 | Korea University Hwajeong Gymnasium | Seoul | South Korea | |

== Showcases ==
List of showcases, showing dates, location, and relevant statistics
| Title | Dates | Venue | City | Country | Ref(s) |
|---|---|---|---|---|---|
| Synk | June 26 – 27, 2022 | YouTube Theater | Los Angeles | United States | |
| Synk | August 6 – 7, 2022 | Pia Arena MM | Yokohama | Japan | |

== Co-headlining ==
Co-headlining concerts as part of SM Town
| Title | Dates | Countries/Territories | Shows | Ref(s) |
|---|---|---|---|---|
| SM Town Live Culture Humanity | January 1, 2021 | Online concert | 1 | |
| SM Town Live 2022: SMCU Express | January 1, 2022 – August 29, 2022 | South Korea; Japan | 4 (Note: Including one show for the New Year free online concert.) | |
| SM Town Live 2023: SMCU Palace | January 1, 2023 – February 22, 2024 | Indonesia; Japan | 4 (Note: Including one show for the New Year free online concert.) | |
| SM Town Live 2025: The Culture, the Future | January 11, 2025 – February 14, 2026 | South Korea; Mexico; United States; England; Japan; Thailand | 10 | |

== Joint concerts and music festivals ==
List of performances, showing dates, location, and relevant informations
| Event | Dates | Venue | City | Country | Performed song(s) | Ref(s) |
|---|---|---|---|---|---|---|
| KBS Song Festival | December 18, 2020 | KBS Hall | Seoul | South Korea | "Black Mamba" | |
| SBS Gayo Daejeon | December 25, 2020 | Daegu Athletics Center | Daegu | South Korea | "Black Mamba" | |
| MBC Gayo Daejejeon | December 31, 2020 | MBC Dream Center | Goyang | South Korea | "Black Mamba" | |
| Korea-UAE K-pop Festival 2021 | April 2, 2021 | Online show | Seoul | South Korea | "Black Mamba" and "Forever" | |
| Dream Concert | June 26, 2021 | Online show | Seoul | South Korea | "Black Mamba" and "Next Level" | |
| Korea on Stage | August 12, 2021 | Seoul Forest | Seoul | South Korea | "Black Mamba" and "Next Level" | |
| Incheon K-Pop Concert | September 25, 2021 | Online show | Incheon | South Korea | "Black Mamba" and "Next Level" | |
| Great Music Festival | October 27, 2021 | Online show | Seoul | South Korea | "Black Mamba" and "Next Level" | |
| K-Pop World Festival | November 3, 2021 | Seongsan Art Hall | Changwon | South Korea | "Next Level" | |
| K-Culture Festival | November 14, 2021 | Korea International Exhibition Center | Goyang | South Korea | "Black Mamba", "Next Level", and "Savage" | |
| KBS Song Festival | December 17, 2021 | KBS Hall | Seoul | South Korea | "Next Level" and "Savage" | |
| SBS Gayo Daejeon | December 25, 2021 | Namdong Gymnasium | Incheon | South Korea | "Next Level" and "Savage" | |
| MBC Gayo Daejejeon | December 31, 2021 | MBC Dream Center | Goyang | South Korea | "Dreams Come True" and "Savage" | |
| Coachella | April 23, 2022 | Empire Polo Club | Indio | United States | "Aenergy", "Black Mamba", "Savage", "Life's Too Short", and "Next Level" | |
| Kyungbock High School Festival | May 2, 2022 | Kyungbock High School | Seoul | South Korea | "Black Mamba", "Savage", and "Next Level" | |
| KAMP LA | October 16, 2022 | Rose Bowl Stadium | Pasadena | United States | "Black Mamba", "Savage", "Illusion", "Girls", "Life's Too Short", and "Next Level" | |
| KBS Song Festival | December 16, 2022 | Jamsil Arena | Seoul | South Korea | "Girls" | |
| SBS Gayo Daejeon | December 24, 2022 | Gocheok Sky Dome | Seoul | South Korea | "Illusion" and "Girls" | |
| MBC Gayo Daejejeon | December 31, 2022 | MBC Dream Center | Goyang | South Korea | "Illusion" and "Girls" | |
| Sound Check Festival | March 25, 2023 | Thunder Dome | Bangkok | Thailand | "Black Mamba", "Illusion", "Life's Too Short", "Lingo", "Savage", and "Next Level" | |
| K-Verse Festival | April 11, 2023 | Smart Araneta Coliseum | Manila | Philippines | "Black Mamba", "Illusion", "Life's Too Short", "Lingo", "Savage", and "Next Level" | |
| ESPERO-PANG! Spring Festival | May 18, 2023 | ERICA Campus, Hanyang University | Ansan | South Korea | "Black Mamba", "Thirsty", "Next Level", "Spicy", and "Illusion" | |
| Akaraka Festival | May 20, 2023 | Yonsei University Outdoor Theatre | Seoul | South Korea | "Black Mamba", "Thirsty", "Next Level", "Spicy", and "Illusion" | |
| Governors Ball Music Festival | June 10, 2023 | Flushing Meadows–Corona Park | Queens | United States | "Girls", "Aenergy", "Salty & Sweet", "Life's Too Short", "Welcome to My World", "Hold on Tight", "Next Level", "Black Mamba", and "Spicy" | |
| Lotte Duty Free Family Concert | June 16, 2023 | KSPO Dome | Seoul | South Korea | "Black Mamba", "Thirsty", "Illusion", "Next Level", and "Spicy" | |
| SEEN Festival | June 18, 2023 | Hội An Resort & Golf | Hội An (now Da Nang) | Vietnam | "Black Mamba", "Next Level", "Welcome to My World", "Thirsty", "Life's Too Short", and "Spicy" | |
| Waterbomb Festival | June 25, 2023 | Seoul Sports Complex | Seoul | South Korea | "Next Level", "Illusion", "Thirsty", "Yeppi Yeppi", and "Spicy" | |
| Outside Lands | August 11, 2023 | Golden Gate Park | San Francisco | United States | "Girls", "Aenergy", "Salty & Sweet", "Life's Too Short", "Welcome to My World", "Hold on Tight", "Next Level", "Black Mamba", and "Spicy" | |
| Yeongdong-daero K-POP Concert | October 8, 2023 | Yeongdong-daero | Seoul | South Korea | "Black Mamba", "Spicy", and "Next Level" | |
| One Universe Festival | October 8, 2023 | Seoul Forest | Seoul | South Korea | "Aenergy", "Black Mamba", "Thirsty", "Spicy", and "Next Level" | |
| K-Music Season Goodnight Concert | November 5, 2023 | Busan Cinema Center | Busan | South Korea | "Next Level", "Thirsty", "Better Things", and "Spicy" | |
| K-Link Festival | December 10, 2023 | Jamsil Arena | Seoul | South Korea | "Spicy", "Trick or Trick", "Next Level", and "Drama" | |
| KBS Song Festival | December 15, 2023 | KBS Hall | Seoul | South Korea | "Spicy" and "Drama" | |
| SBS Gayo Daejeon | December 25, 2023 | Inspire Arena | Incheon | South Korea | "Mirotic" and "Drama" | |
| MBC Gayo Daejejeon | December 31, 2023 | MBC Dream Center | Goyang | South Korea | "Trick or Trick" and "Drama" | |
| K-pop Masterz X KROSS | January 2, 2024 | Vantelin Dome Nagoya | Nagoya | Japan | "Drama", "Trick or Trick", "Hold On Tight", "Spicy", and "Next Level" | |
| GMO Sonic | January 28, 2024 | Saitama Super Arena | Saitama | Japan | "Next Level", "Illusion", "Better Things", "Welcome to My World", "Thirsty", "Hold On Tight", "Yeppi Yeppi", "Spicy", "Black Mamba", "Trick or Trick", and "Drama" | |
| KCON Hong Kong | March 30, 2024 | AsiaWorld–Arena | Hong Kong | China | "Drama", "Trick or Trick", "Next Level", and "Spicy" | |
| Kangnam University Summer Festival | May 22, 2024 | Kangnam University | Yongin | South Korea | "Supernova", "Black Mamba", "Regret of the Times", "Spicy", and "Next Level" | |
| Dankook University Festival | May 22, 2024 | Dankook University | Yongin | South Korea | "Supernova", "Black Mamba", "Regret of the Times", "Spicy", and "Next Level" | |
| Kyung Hee University Festival | May 23, 2024 | Kyung Hee University | Seoul | South Korea | "Supernova", "Black Mamba", "Regret of the Times", "Spicy", and "Next Level" | |
| Kangwon National University Festival | May 24, 2024 | Kangwon National University | Seoul | South Korea | "Supernova", "Black Mamba", "Regret of the Times", "Spicy", and "Next Level" | |
| Arakara Festival | May 25, 2024 | Yonsei University Outdoor Theatre | Seoul | South Korea | "Supernova", "Black Mamba", "Regret of the Times", "Spicy", and "Next Level" | |
| Sungkyunkwan University Festival | May 30, 2024 | Sungkyunkwan University | Seoul | South Korea | "Supernova", "Armageddon", "We Go", "Spicy", and "Next Level" | |
| K-Wave Concert Inkigayo | June 2, 2024 | Inspire Arena | Incheon | South Korea | "Supernova" and "Armageddon" | |
| Krazy Super Concert | September 14 – 15, 2024 | Long Beach Arena | Long Beach | United States | "Black Mamba", "Supernova", "Hold on Tight", "Armageddon", and "Next Level" | |
| K-Link Festival | October 5, 2024 | Inspire Arena | Incheon | South Korea | "Supernova", "Thirsty", "Next Level", and "Armageddon" | |
| Music Bank in Madrid | October 12, 2024 | Auditorio Miguel Ríos | Madrid | Spain | "Spicy", "Supernova", "Next Level", and "Armageddon" | |
| K-Wonder Concert | October 19, 2024 | Taoyuan Arena | Taoyuan | Taiwan | "Black Mamba", "Supernova", "Hold on Tight", "Spicy", "Next Level", and "Armageddon" | |
| Chungnam National University Fall Festival | October 30, 2024 | Chungnam National University | Daejeon | South Korea | "Black Mamba", "Supernova", "Thirsty", "Whiplash", and "Next Level" | |
| Kyung Hee University Fall Festival | October 30, 2024 | Kyung Hee University | Seoul | South Korea | "Black Mamba", "Supernova", "Thirsty", "Whiplash", and "Next Level" | |
| UTO Fest Okinawa | December 8, 2024 | Okinawa Cellular Stadium | Naha | Japan | "Supernova", "Flights, Not Feelings", "Thirsty", "Sun and Moon", "Hot Mess", and "Whiplash" | |
| KBS Song Festival | December 20, 2024 | KINTEX | Goyang | South Korea | "Whiplash" and "Armageddon" | |
| SBS Gayo Daejeon | December 25, 2024 | Inspire Arena | Incheon | South Korea | "Pink Hoodie" and "Supernova" | |
| MBC Gayo Daejejeon | December 31, 2024 | MBC Dream Center | Goyang | South Korea | "Supernova" and "Whiplash" | |
| INGALIVE UNI-CON | April 13, 2025 | Tokyo Dome | Tokyo | Japan | "Whiplash", "Sun and Moon", "Hot Mess", "Next Level", and "Supernova" | |
| K-FLOW3 Concert | April 25 – 26, 2025 | NTSU Arena | Taipei | Taiwan | "Whiplash", "Supernova", "Hold on Tight", "Spicy", "Flights, Not Feelings", and "Next Level" | |
| UTO Girls Fest | April 27, 2025 | Queen Sirikit National Convention Center | Bangkok | Thailand | "Supernova", "Next Level", "Hold on Tight", "Spicy", "Just Another Girl", and "Whiplash" | |
| Hongik University Festival | May 16, 2025 | Hongik University | Seoul | South Korea | "Whiplash", "Supernova", "Flights, Not Feelings", "Spicy", and "Next Level" | |
| Superpop Korea | May 17, 2025 | KINTEX | Goyang | South Korea | "Whiplash", "Supernova", "Thirsty", "Flights, Not Feelings", "Spicy", and "Next Level" | |
| Chung-Ang University Festival | May 21, 2025 | Chung-Ang University | Seoul | South Korea | "Whiplash", "Supernova", "Flights, Not Feelings", "Spicy", and "Next Level" | |
| Konkuk University Festival | May 21, 2025 | Konkuk University | Seoul | South Korea | "Whiplash", "Supernova", "Flights, Not Feelings", "Spicy", and "Next Level" | |
| MyK Festa | June 19, 2025 | KSPO Dome | Seoul | South Korea | "Whiplash", "Supernova", "Thirsty", "Flights, Not Feelings", and "Next Level" | |
| Mawazine | June 24, 2025 | OLM Souissi | Rabat | Morocco | "Whiplash", "Next Level", "Flights, Not Feelings", "Live My Life", "Better Things", "Spicy", "Hold on Tight", "Aenergy", "Armageddon", "Set the Tone", and "Supernova" | |
| Show! Music Core in Japan | July 6, 2025 | Belluna Dome | Saitama | Japan | "Dirty Work", "Sun and Moon", "Supernova", and "Whiplash" | |
| KCON Los Angeles | August 2, 2025 | Crypto.com Arena | Los Angeles | United States | "Whiplash", "Supernova", "Flights, Not Feelings", and "Dirty Work" | |
| Summer Sonic Festival | August 17, 2025 | Zozo Marine Stadium | Chiba | Japan | "Supernova", "Hot Mess", "Next Level", "Armageddon", "Flights, Not Feelings", "Better Things", "Zoom Zoom", "Whiplash", and "Dirty Work" | |
| KB's Joy Olpark Festival | September 21, 2025 | Olympic Park | Seoul | South Korea | "Rich Man", "Supernova", "Whiplash", "Angel #48", "Dirty Work", and "Live My Life" | |
| KBS Song Festival | December 19, 2025 | Songdo Convensia | Incheon | South Korea | "Dirty Work" and "Rich Man" | |
| SBS Gayo Daejeon | December 25, 2025 | Inspire Arena | Incheon | South Korea | "Rich Man" | |
| MBC Gayo Daejejeon | December 31, 2025 | MBC Dream Center | Goyang | South Korea | "Kill It" and "Rich Man" | |
| Ipselenti Festival | May 22, 2026 | Korea University | Seoul | South Korea | "WDA (Whole Different Animal)", "Live My Life", "Supernova", "Whiplash", and "Next Level" | |
| Akaraka Festival | May 23, 2026 | Yonsei University Outdoor Theatre | Seoul | South Korea | "WDA (Whole Different Animal)", "Live My Life", "Supernova", "Whiplash", and "Next Level" | |
| Rachios Festival | May 27, 2026 | Seoul Campus, Hanyang University | Seoul | South Korea | "WDA (Whole Different Animal)", "Live My Life", "Supernova", "Whiplash", and "Next Level" | |
| Quinquatria Festival | June 2, 2026 | Seoul Campus, Hankuk University of Foreign Studies | Seoul | South Korea | "WDA (Whole Different Animal)", "Supernova", "Whiplash", "Next Level", and "Lemonade" | |
| Lollapalooza | August 2, 2026 | Grant Park | Chicago | United States | "Black Mamba", "Next Level", "Rich Man", "Can't Help Myself", "Bubble", "To the Girls", "Armageddon", "WDA (Whole Different Animal)", "Supernova", "Switchblade" (with Ty Dolla Sign), "Shakin'", "Hold on Tight", "Whiplash", and "Lemonade" | |
| FNS Music Festival | December 9, 2026 | Fuji TV Studio | Tokyo | Japan | TBA | |
| Music Bank Global Festival | December 12, 2026 | MUFG Stadium | Tokyo | Japan | TBA | |

== Awards shows ==
List of performances, showing dates, location, and relevant informations
| Event | Dates | Venue | City | Country | Performed song(s) | Ref(s) |
|---|---|---|---|---|---|---|
| Seoul Music Awards | January 31, 2021 | Olympic Gymnastics Arena | Seoul | South Korea | "Black Mamba" | |
| Tokopedia WIB Indonesia K-pop Awards | November 25, 2021 | eX Plaza Indonesia | Jakarta | Indonesia | "Savage" | |
| Asia Artist Awards | December 2, 2021 | KBS Hall | Seoul | South Korea | "Next Level" and "Savage" | |
| Mnet Asian Music Awards | December 11, 2021 | CJ ENM Contents World | Paju | South Korea | "Next Level" and "Savage" | |
| SBS Entertainment Awards | December 18, 2021 | SBS Prism Tower | Seoul | South Korea | "Next Level" | |
| Golden Disc Awards | January 8, 2022 | Gocheok Sky Dome | Seoul | South Korea | "Next Level" and "Savage" | |
| Open Awards | January 16, 2023 | —N/a | Seoul | South Korea | "Illusion", "Dreams Come True", and "Next Level" | |
| Circle Chart Music Awards | February 18, 2023 | KSPO Dome | Seoul | South Korea | "Illusion" and "Girls" | |
| The Fact Music Awards | October 10, 2023 | Namdong Gymnasium | Incheon | South Korea | "Better Things" and "Spicy" | |
| Melon Music Awards | December 2, 2023 | Inspire Arena | Incheon | South Korea | "Trick or Trick" and "Drama" | |
| Hanteo Music Awards | February 18, 2024 | Dongdaemun Design Plaza | Seoul | South Korea | "Trick or Trick" and "Drama" | |
| K-World Dream Awards | August 22, 2024 | Jamsil Arena | Seoul | South Korea | "Supernova" and "Armageddon" | |
| The Fact Music Awards | September 8, 2024 | Kyocera Dome Osaka | Osaka | Japan | "Supernova", "Set the Tone", and "Armageddon" | |
| TikTok Awards Korea | November 15, 2024 | Kyunghee University Grand Peace Palace | Seoul | South Korea | "Armageddon" and "Whiplash" | |
| Korea Grand Music Awards | November 17, 2024 | Inspire Arena | Incheon | South Korea | "Whiplash", "Supernova", and "Armageddon" | |
| MAMA Awards | November 23, 2024 | Kyocera Dome Osaka | Osaka | Japan | "Bored!" (Ningning solo), "Spark" (Winter solo), "Dopamine" (Giselle solo), "Up" (Karina solo), "Supernova", and "Whiplash" | |
| Melon Music Awards | November 30, 2024 | Inspire Arena | Incheon | South Korea | "Whiplash", "Supernova", and "Armageddon" | |
| Golden Disc Awards | January 4, 2025 | Mizuho PayPay Dome | Fukuoka | Japan | "Set the Tone" and "Supernova" | |
| MTV Video Music Awards Japan | March 19, 2025 | K-Arena Yokohama | Yokohama | Japan | "Whiplash" | |
| Billboard Women in Music | March 29, 2025 | YouTube Theater | Inglewood | United States | "Whiplash" | |
| Asia Star Entertainer Awards | May 28, 2025 | K-Arena Yokohama | Yokohama | Japan | "Whiplash", "Supernova", and "Armageddon" | |
| TMElive International Music Awards | August 22, 2025 | Galaxy Arena | Macau | China | "Whiplash", "Supernova", "Thirsty", "Flights, Not Feelings", and "Dirty Work" | |
| The Fact Music Awards | September 20, 2025 | Macao Outdoor Performance Venue | Macau | China | "Dirty Work", "Whiplash", and "Rich Man" | |
| MAMA Awards | November 29, 2025 | Kai Tak Stadium | Hong Kong | China | "Dirty Work" and "Rich Man" | |
| Melon Music Awards | December 20, 2025 | Gocheok Sky Dome | Seoul | South Korea | "Drift", "Rich Man", and "Dirty Work" | |
| TMElive International Music Awards | August 22, 2026 | Kai Tak Stadium | Hong Kong | China | "Whiplash", "WDA (Whole Different Animal)", "Camouflage", "Can't Help Myself", "Supernova", and "Lemonade" | |
| Melon Music Awards | November 14, 2026 | Gocheok Sky Dome | Seoul | South Korea | "WDA (Whole Different Animal)", "Switchblade", and "Lemonade" | |

== Television shows and specials ==
List of performances, showing dates, location, and relevant information
| Event | Dates | Country | Performed song(s) | Ref(s) |
|---|---|---|---|---|
| Music Bank | November 20, 2020 | South Korea | "Black Mamba" | |
| Inkigayo | November 22, 2020 | South Korea | "Black Mamba" | |
| The Show | November 24, 2020 | South Korea | "Black Mamba" | |
| Music Bank | November 27, 2020 | South Korea | "Black Mamba" | |
| Show! Music Core | November 28, 2020 | South Korea | "Black Mamba" | |
| Inkigayo | November 29, 2020 | South Korea | "Black Mamba" | |
| The Show | December 8, 2020 | South Korea | "Black Mamba" | |
| Music Bank | December 11, 2020 | South Korea | "Black Mamba" | |
| Show! Music Core | December 12, 2020 | South Korea | "Black Mamba" | |
| Inkigayo | December 13, 2020 | South Korea | "Black Mamba" | |
| Music Bank | May 28, 2021 | South Korea | "Next Level" | |
| Inkigayo | May 30, 2021 | South Korea | "Next Level" | |
| M Countdown | June 3, 2021 | South Korea | "Next Level" | |
| Show! Music Core | June 5, 2021 | South Korea | "Next Level" | |
| Music Bank | June 25, 2021 | South Korea | "Next Level" | |
| M Countdown | October 14, 2021 | South Korea | "Savage" | |
| The Kelly Clarkson Show | October 15, 2021 | United States | "Savage" | |
| Show! Music Core | October 16, 2021 | South Korea | "Savage" | |
| Music Bank | October 22, 2021 | South Korea | "Savage" | |
| Inkigayo | October 24, 2021 | South Korea | "Savage" | |
| The Show | October 26, 2021 | South Korea | "Savage" | |
| The Nick Cannon Show | December 9, 2021 | United States | "Savage" | |
| Show! Music Core | January 8, 2022 | South Korea | "Dreams Come True" | |
| Inkigayo | January 9, 2022 | South Korea | "Dreams Come True" | |
| Jimmy Kimmel Live! | June 29, 2022 | United States | "Life's Too Short" | |
| Good Morning America's Summer Concert Series | July 8, 2022 | United States | "Life's Too Short", "Black Mamba", "Girls", "Illusion", and "Next Level" | |
| M Countdown | July 14, 2022 | South Korea | "Illusion" and "Girls" | |
| Show! Music Core | July 16, 2022 | South Korea | "Illusion" and "Girls" | |
| Music Bank | July 22, 2022 | South Korea | "Girls" | |
| Inkigayo | July 24, 2022 | South Korea | "Illusion" and "Girls" | |
| Music Station | April 28, 2023 | Japan | "Black Mamba" | |
| CDTV! Live! Live! | May 1, 2023 | Japan | "Girls" | |
| Mezamashi Live | May 2, 2023 | Japan | "Next Level" | |
| M Countdown | May 11, 2023 | South Korea | "Salty & Sweet" and "Spicy" | |
| Music Bank | May 12, 2023 | South Korea | "Thirsty" and "Spicy" | |
| Show! Music Core | May 13, 2023 | South Korea | "Salty & Sweet" and "Spicy" | |
| Music Universe K-909 | May 13, 2023 | South Korea | "Spicy", "Welcome to My World", and "Hold on Tight" | |
| Inkigayo | May 14, 2023 | South Korea | "Thirsty" and "Spicy" | |
| M Countdown | May 18, 2023 | South Korea | "Spicy" | |
| Music Bank | May 19, 2023 | South Korea | "Spicy" | |
| Show! Music Core | May 20, 2023 | South Korea | "Spicy" | |
| Inkigayo | May 21, 2023 | South Korea | "Spicy" | |
| It's Live | May 21, 2023 | South Korea | "Thirsty" and "Spicy" | |
| M Countdown | August 24, 2023 | South Korea | "Better Things" | |
| Good Morning America | September 6, 2023 | United States | "Better Things" | |
| Music Bank | November 10, 2023 | South Korea | "Drama" | |
| Show! Music Core | November 11, 2023 | South Korea | "Drama" | |
| Inkigayo | November 12, 2023 | South Korea | "Drama" | |
| Show Champion | November 15, 2023 | South Korea | "Drama" | |
| M Countdown | November 16, 2023 | South Korea | "Drama" | |
| Music Bank | November 17, 2023 | South Korea | "Drama" | |
| Show! Music Core | November 18, 2023 | South Korea | "Drama" | |
| Inkigayo | November 19, 2023 | South Korea | "Drama" | |
| NPOP | November 23, 2023 | South Korea | "Drama" | |
| Venue 101 | April 6, 2024 | Japan | "Drama" | |
| M Countdown | May 16, 2024 | South Korea | "Supernova" | |
| Music Bank | May 17, 2024 | South Korea | "Supernova" | |
| Show! Music Core | May 18, 2024 | South Korea | "Supernova" | |
| Inkigayo | May 19, 2024 | South Korea | "Supernova" | |
| M Countdown | May 23, 2024 | South Korea | "Supernova" | |
| Music Bank | May 24, 2024 | South Korea | "Supernova" | |
| Show! Music Core | May 25, 2024 | South Korea | "Supernova" | |
| Inkigayo | May 26, 2024 | South Korea | "Supernova" | |
| M Countdown | May 30, 2024 | South Korea | "Armageddon" | |
| Music Bank | May 31, 2024 | South Korea | "Armageddon" | |
| Show! Music Core | June 1, 2024 | South Korea | "Armageddon" | |
| FNS Kayousai Natsu | July 3, 2024 | Japan | "Hot Mess" | |
| The Music Day | July 6, 2024 | Japan | "Supernova" | |
| Music Station | July 12, 2024 | Japan | "Hot Mess" | |
| M Countdown | October 24, 2024 | South Korea | "Whiplash" | |
| Show! Music Core | October 26, 2024 | South Korea | "Whiplash" | |
| Inkigayo | October 27, 2024 | South Korea | "Whiplash" | |
| Music Bank | November 1, 2024 | South Korea | "Whiplash" | |
| The Seasons: Lee Young-ji's Rainbow | November 1, 2024 | South Korea | "Supernova", "Whiplash", and "Flights, Not Feelings" | |
| Show! Music Core | November 2, 2024 | South Korea | "Whiplash" | |
| Inkigayo | November 3, 2024 | South Korea | "Whiplash" | |
| Best Hits Kayosai | November 14, 2024 | Japan | "Whiplash" | |
| FNS Kayousai | December 4, 2024 | Japan | "Supernova" | |
| Music Station Super Live | December 27, 2024 | Japan | "Supernova" | |
| M Countdown | July 3, 2025 | South Korea | "Dirty Work" | |
| Music Bank | July 4, 2025 | South Korea | "Dirty Work" | |
| Inkigayo | July 6, 2025 | South Korea | "Dirty Work" | |
| M Countdown | July 10, 2025 | South Korea | "Dirty Work" | |
| Music Bank | July 11, 2025 | South Korea | "Dirty Work" | |
| Show! Music Core | July 12, 2025 | South Korea | "Dirty Work" | |
| Inkigayo | July 13, 2025 | South Korea | "Dirty Work" | |
| Venue 101 | August 30, 2025 | Japan | "Whiplash", "Supernova", "Sun and Moon", "Hot Mess", "Next Level", and "Dirty Work" | |
| Music Bank | September 5, 2025 | South Korea | "Rich Man" | |
| M:ZINE | September 6, 2025 | Japan | "Dirty Work" and "Supernova" | |
| Show! Music Core | September 6, 2025 | South Korea | "Rich Man" | |
| Inkigayo | September 7, 2025 | South Korea | "Rich Man" | |
| M Countdown | September 11, 2025 | South Korea | "Rich Man" | |
| Good Morning America | September 12, 2025 | United States | "Rich Man" | |
| The Jennifer Hudson Show | September 24, 2025 | United States | "Rich Man" | |
| Amazon Music Live | November 13, 2025 | United States | "Dirty Work", "Armageddon", "Better Things", "Angel #48", "Next Level", "Hold on Tight", "Supernova", "Drift", "Rich Man", and "Whiplash" | |
| Kōhaku Uta Gassen | December 31, 2025 | Japan | "Whiplash" | |
| M Countdown | May 14, 2026 | South Korea | "WDA (Whole Different Animal)" | |
| Music Bank | May 15, 2026 | South Korea | "WDA (Whole Different Animal)" | |
| Show! Music Core | May 16, 2026 | South Korea | "WDA (Whole Different Animal)" | |
| Inkigayo | May 17, 2026 | South Korea | "WDA (Whole Different Animal)" | |
| Music Bank | May 29, 2026 | South Korea | "Lemonade" | |
| Show! Music Core | May 30, 2026 | South Korea | "Lemonade" | |
| Inkigayo | May 31, 2026 | South Korea | "Lemonade" | |
| Music Bank | June 5, 2026 | South Korea | "Lemonade" | |
| Show! Music Core | June 6, 2026 | South Korea | "Lemonade" | |
| Inkigayo | June 7, 2026 | South Korea | "Lemonade" | |
| TV Tokyo's Ongakusai 2026 Natsu | June 28, 2026 | Japan | "Lemonade" | |
| Star | July 23, 2026 | Japan | "Kiss n Tell" | |
| Buzz Rhythm 02 | September 11, 2026 | Japan | "Kiss n Tell" | |

== Other live performances ==
List of performances, showing dates, location, and relevant information
| Event | Dates | Venue | City | Country | Performed song(s) | Ref(s) |
|---|---|---|---|---|---|---|
| Naver NOW Party B XR Live | November 30, 2020 | —N/a | —N/a | South Korea | "Black Mamba" | |
| Tokopedia WIB TV Show | June 25, 2021 | eX Plaza Indonesia | Jakarta | Indonesia | "Next Level" and "Black Mamba" | |
| World Cultural Industry Forum | July 1, 2021 | SMTOWN Theatre at COEX Atrium | Seoul | South Korea | "Black Mamba", "Forever", and "Next Level" | |
| Wild Rift SEA Championship Opening Ceremony | October 3, 2021 | —N/a | Seoul | South Korea | "Next Level" | |
| United Nations Day Concert | October 24, 2021 | —N/a | Seoul | South Korea | "Next Level" and "Black Mamba" | |
| Macy's Thanksgiving Day Parade | November 25, 2021 | Manhattan | New York City | United States | "Savage" | |
| Soonchunhyang University's Virtual Enrollment Ceremony | April 18, 2022 | —N/a | Seoul | South Korea | "Next Level" and "Dreams Come True" | |
| Tokyo Girls Collection | September 3, 2022 | Saitama Super Arena | Saitama | Japan | "Black Mamba", "Next Level", and "Girls" | |
| KB Kookmin Bank Meeting | January 14, 2023 | —N/a | Seoul | South Korea | "Illusion", "Dreams Come True", "Girls", and "Next Level" | |
| My World Comeback Press Conference | May 8, 2023 | COEX Atrium | Seoul | South Korea | "Spicy" | |
| Love Your W | November 24, 2023 | Four Seasons Hotel Seoul | Seoul | South Korea | "Drama", "Next Level", and "Spicy" | |
| MLB World Tour: Seoul Series | March 20, 2024 | Gocheok Sky Dome | Seoul | South Korea | "Drama" and "Next Level" | |
| Armageddon Comeback Press Conference | May 27, 2024 | Blue Square Mastercard Hall | Seoul | South Korea | "Armageddon" | |
| Secret Transfer Student | May 28, 2024 | Seoul Design High School | Seoul | South Korea | "Supernova" and "Armageddon" | |
| The First Take | August 12, 2024 | The First Take Studio | Tokyo | Japan | "Supernova" and "Hot Mess" | |
| Richoco Land | November 9, 2024 | Indonesia Convention Exhibition | Tangerang Regency | Indonesia | "Supernova", "Whiplash", and "Next Level" | |
| PUBG Nations Cup 2025 Final Stage Opening Ceremony | July 27, 2025 | ticketLINK Live Arena | Seoul | South Korea | "Dark Arts" | |
