= Synk: Aexis Line =

2025–2026 concert tour by Aespa

- Tour by Aespa
- Promotional poster for the Seoul concert
- Location: South Korea; Japan; Thailand; China; Indonesia
- Associated album: Rich Man
- Start date: August 29, 2025
- End date: April 26, 2026
- Legs: 1
- No. of shows: 25

Aespa concert chronology
- Synk: Parallel Line (2024–25); Synk: Aexis Line (2025–26); Synk: Complaexity (2026–27)

Synk: Aexis Line is the third concert tour by South Korean girl group Aespa. Spanning 25 shows across five countries in Asia, the tour began on August 29, 2025, at the KSPO Dome in Seoul, South Korea, and concluded on April 26, 2026, at the Tokyo Dome in Tokyo, Japan.

== Background ==
On June 10, 2025, SM Entertainment revealed that Aespa would be embarking on their third concert tour, following the conclusion of their previous tour Synk: Parallel Line in March. The announcement came after news that the group would hold a Japan tour in May. The tour is set to begin with three consecutive shows at the KSPO Dome in Seoul, South Korea, before continuing on to Fukuoka, Tokyo, Nagoya and Osaka in Japan. Additional Asian dates were announced on August 6. On November 8, four new Japanese shows were added.

== Set list ==
=== Main set ===
1. "Armageddon"
2. "Set the tone"
3. "Drift"
4. "Dirty Work"
5. "Good Stuff" (Karina solo)
6. "Ketchup and Lemonade" (Ningning solo)
7. "Tornado" (Giselle solo)
8. "Blue" (Winter solo)
9. "Illusion"
10. "Trick or Trick"
11. "Flowers"
12. "Lucid Dream"
13. "Thirsty"
14. "Angel #48"
15. "Better Things"
16. "Spicy"
17. "Rich Man"
18. "Kill It"
19. "Dark Arts"
20. "Next Level"
21. "Supernova"
22. "Whiplash"
23. "Girls" / "Drama" (remix)

=== Encore ===
1. "Forever"
2. "Live My Life"
3. "To The Girls"

==== Alterations ====
- "Hot Mess", "Zoom Zoom", and "Sun and Moon" replaced "Illusion", "Spicy", and "Forever" respectively for the Japanese shows.
- Winter was absent from the second show in Pak Kret due to health issues.
- Giselle was absent from the first show in Macau due to scheduling issues.

== Tour dates ==
List of concerts, showing date, city, country, venue, attendance, and gross revenue
Date	City	Country	Venue	Attendance
August 29, 2025	Seoul	South Korea	KSPO Dome	30,000
August 30, 2025	Seoul	South Korea	KSPO Dome	30,000
August 31, 2025	Seoul	South Korea	KSPO Dome	30,000
October 4, 2025	Fukuoka	Japan	Marine Messe Fukuoka	20,000
October 5, 2025	Fukuoka	Japan	Marine Messe Fukuoka	20,000
October 11, 2025	Tokyo	Japan	Ariake Arena	30,000
October 12, 2025	Tokyo	Japan	Ariake Arena	30,000
October 13, 2025	Tokyo	Japan	Ariake Arena	30,000
October 18, 2025	Nagoya (Note: Promoted as Aichi)	Japan	IG Arena	20,000
October 19, 2025	Nagoya	Japan	IG Arena	20,000
November 8, 2025	Tokyo	Japan	Yoyogi National Gymnasium	24,000
November 9, 2025	Tokyo	Japan	Yoyogi National Gymnasium	24,000
November 15, 2025	Pak Kret (Note: Promoted as Bangkok)	Thailand	Impact Arena	22,000
November 16, 2025	Pak Kret	Thailand	Impact Arena	22,000
November 26, 2025	Osaka	Japan	Osaka-jō Hall	20,000
November 27, 2025	Osaka	Japan	Osaka-jō Hall	20,000
February 7, 2026	Hong Kong	China	AsiaWorld–Arena	— (Note: According to The Chosun Daily, the show were sold out with no specific attendance number reported.)
February 8, 2026	Hong Kong	China	AsiaWorld–Arena	—
March 7, 2026	Macau	China	Galaxy Arena	—
March 8, 2026	Macau	China	Galaxy Arena	—
April 4, 2026	Tangerang (Note: Promoted as Jakarta)	Indonesia	Indonesia Convention Exhibition	—
April 11, 2026	Osaka	Japan	Kyocera Dome Osaka	76,000
April 12, 2026	Osaka	Japan	Kyocera Dome Osaka	76,000
April 25, 2026	Tokyo	Japan	Tokyo Dome	94,000
April 26, 2026	Tokyo	Japan	Tokyo Dome	94,000
Total				336,000 (Note: This tally reflects only reported figures available in the table and should not be read as the tour's total attendance.)
