= Synk: Parallel Line =

2024–25 concert tour by Aespa

- World tour by Aespa
- Promotional poster for the Seoul concert
- Associated album: Armageddon; Whiplash
- Start date: June 29, 2024
- End date: March 16, 2025
- Legs: 3
- No. of shows: 43
- Attendance: 486,000 (Note: 38/43 reported shows)
- Box office: $24.868 million (Note: 18/43 reported shows)

Aespa concert chronology
- Synk: Hyper Line (2023); Synk: Parallel Line (2024–2025); Synk: Aexis Line (2025-2026)

Synk: Parallel Line was the second worldwide concert tour by South Korean girl group Aespa, in support of their first studio album Armageddon (2024). The tour began on June 29, 2024, at Jamsil Indoor Stadium, and concluded on March 16, 2025, at KSPO Dome in Seoul, South Korea. The tour consists of 43 concerts around Asia, Oceania, North America and Europe.

== Background ==
On February 19, 2024, Aespa officially announced via X (formerly Twitter) and Weverse the first dates of their upcoming world tour, with more dates to come. On April 11, Aespa announced via their Japan fanclub two additional shows on August 17 and 18, 2024, held at Tokyo Dome, as a "Special Edition" of the concert. Full event and ticketing information for the initial legs was announced May 1, via their Weverse fanclub page. On May 10, an additional show was announced for Sydney due to demand.

On May 11, Aespa announced that a concert scheduled for July 7 in Fukuoka, Japan, would be postponed due to feedback on social media regarding the date coinciding with a Chinese national day of mourning for the Marco Polo Bridge incident. The show later rescheduled to July 30 and a new show added on July 31.

== Set list ==
The following set list is from the concert on June 29, 2024, in Seoul, South Korea, and is not intended to represent all shows throughout the tour.

1. "Drama"
2. "Black Mamba"
3. "Salty & Sweet"
4. "Supernova"
5. "Mine"
6. "Illusion"
7. "Thirsty"
8. "Prologue"
9. "Long Chat (#♥)"
10. "Dopamine" (Giselle solo)
11. "Up" (Karina solo)
12. "Bored!" (Ningning solo)
13. "Spark" (Winter solo)
14. "Spicy"
15. "Licorice"
16. "Hold on Tight"
17. "Regret of the Times"
18. "Live My Life"
19. "We Go"
20. "Trick or Trick"
21. "Set the Tone"
22. "Next Level"
23. "Armageddon"

Encore

24. "Aenergy"
25. "Bahama"
26. "Melody"

=== Notes ===
- Karina was absent from the second show in Osaka and two extra shows in Fukuoka due to health issues.
- At the two Tokyo shows, "Savage" and "Girls" were added before "Supernova".
- "Illusion" was removed from the setlist after Seoul.
- Starting from Seattle's show:
  - "Illusion", "Prologue", "Long Chat (#♥)", "Thirsty", "Trick or Trick", "Licorice", "Regret of the Times", "Bahama", and "Melody" were taken out of the setlist.
  - "Die Trying", "Flights, Not Feelings", "Better Things", "Pink Hoodie", "Done" (sung by Naevis), "Whiplash", "Just Another Girl", and "Life's Too Short" were added.

== Tour dates ==
Date	City	Country	Venue	Attendance	Revenue
June 29, 2024	Seoul	South Korea	Jamsil Indoor Stadium	12,000	—
June 30, 2024	Seoul	South Korea	Jamsil Indoor Stadium	12,000	—
July 6, 2024	Fukuoka	Japan	Marine Messe Fukuoka	100,000 (Note: The score data is combined from the nine total shows held in Fukuoka, Nagoya, Saitama, and Osaka.)	—
July 10, 2024	Nagoya	Japan	Aichi Sky Expo	100,000	—
July 11, 2024	Nagoya	Japan	Aichi Sky Expo	100,000	—
July 14, 2024	Saitama	Japan	Saitama Super Arena	100,000	—
July 15, 2024	Saitama	Japan	Saitama Super Arena	100,000	—
July 20, 2024	Singapore		Singapore Indoor Stadium	8,500	—
July 27, 2024	Osaka	Japan	Asue Arena Osaka		—
July 28, 2024	Osaka	Japan	Asue Arena Osaka		—
July 30, 2024	Fukuoka	Japan	Marine Messe Fukuoka		—
July 31, 2024	Fukuoka	Japan	Marine Messe Fukuoka		—
August 3, 2024	Hong Kong		AsiaWorld–Expo, Hall 10	—	—
August 4, 2024	Hong Kong		AsiaWorld–Expo, Hall 10	—	—
August 9, 2024	Taoyuan	Taiwan	NTSU Arena	27,000	$4,588,000
August 10, 2024	Taoyuan	Taiwan	NTSU Arena	27,000	$4,588,000
August 11, 2024	Taoyuan	Taiwan	NTSU Arena	27,000	$4,588,000
August 17, 2024	Tokyo	Japan	Tokyo Dome	94,000	—
August 18, 2024	Tokyo	Japan	Tokyo Dome	94,000	—
August 24, 2024	Jakarta	Indonesia	Beach City International Stadium	—	—
August 30, 2024	Sydney	Australia	Qudos Bank Arena	35,000	—
August 31, 2024	Sydney	Australia	Qudos Bank Arena	35,000	—
September 2, 2024	Melbourne	Australia	Rod Laver Arena	35,000	—
September 21, 2024	Macau		Macau Studio City Event Centre	—	—
September 22, 2024	Macau		Macau Studio City Event Centre	—	—
September 28, 2024	Bangkok	Thailand	Impact Arena	20,000	—
September 29, 2024	Bangkok	Thailand	Impact Arena	20,000	—
January 28, 2025	Kent (Note: Labelled as Seattle in promotional material.)	United States	accesso ShoWare Center	138,000	$18,000,000
January 30, 2025	Oakland	United States	Oakland Arena	138,000	$18,000,000
February 1, 2025	Inglewood (Note: Labelled as Los Angeles in promotional material.)	United States	Kia Forum	138,000	$18,000,000
February 4, 2025	Mexico City	Mexico	Palacio de los Deportes	138,000	$18,000,000
February 6, 2025	Orlando	United States	Kia Center	138,000	$18,000,000
February 8, 2025	Charlotte	United States	Spectrum Center	138,000	$18,000,000
February 11, 2025	Newark	United States	Prudential Center	138,000	$18,000,000
February 13, 2025	Toronto	Canada	Scotiabank Arena	138,000	$18,000,000
February 15, 2025	Chicago	United States	United Center	138,000	$18,000,000
March 2, 2025	London	England	OVO Arena Wembley	138,000	$18,000,000
March 4, 2025	Paris	France	Zénith Paris	138,000	$18,000,000
March 6, 2025	Amsterdam	Netherlands	AFAS Live	138,000	$18,000,000
March 9, 2025	Frankfurt	Germany	myticket Jahrhunderthalle	138,000	$18,000,000
March 12, 2025	Madrid	Spain	Movistar Arena	138,000	$18,000,000
March 15, 2025	Seoul	South Korea	KSPO Dome	20,000	—
March 16, 2025	Seoul	South Korea	KSPO Dome	20,000	—
Total				486,000 (Note: This tally reflects only reported figures available in the table and should not be read as the tour's total attendance.)	$24,868,000 (Note: This tally reflects only reported figures available in the table and should not be read as the tour's total revenue.)
