= Kiss and Tell =

Kiss and Tell, Kiss & Tell, Kiss n Tell, Kiss 'n' Tell or Kiss N Tell may refer to:

== Books ==
- A kiss-and-tell biography, an unauthorized biography written by a friend or confidant of the subject
- Kiss and Tell (play), a 1943 Broadway play by F. Hugh Herbert
- Kiss and Tell, a 2000 romance novel by Cherry Adair
- Kiss and Tell, a 2004 non-fiction book about kissing by Julie Enfield
- Sex and the City: Kiss and Tell, a companion guide to the TV show by Amy Sohn

== Film and television ==
- Kiss and Tell (1945 film), a Richard Wallace film based on the 1943 play
- Kiss & Tell (1997 film), a 1997 independent feature starring Heather Graham
- Kiss and Tell (1996 film), a 1996 TV film, directed by Andy Wolk
- Kiss and Tell (2011 film), a 2011 film directed by Desmond Elliot
- "Kiss and Tell" (Gilmore Girls), a 2000 television episode
- "Kiss and Tell" (The Royal), a 2003 television episode
- "Kiss and Tell" (Young Americans), a 2000 television episode

== Music ==
=== Albums ===
- Kiss & Tell (Selena Gomez & the Scene album), and a song from that album, 2009
- Kiss & Tell (Sahara Hotnights album), 2004
- Kiss N Tell (EP), a extended play (EP) by Aespa, 2026

=== Songs ===
- "Kiss and Tell", a song by Isley-Jasper-Isley from Broadway's Closer to Sunset Blvd (1984)
- "Kiss 'n' Tell" (Chantoozies song), 1988
- "Kiss and Tell" (Bryan Ferry song), 1988
- "Kiss and Tell", a song by Brownstone from Still Climbing (1997)
- "Kiss and Tell", a song by Crystal Lewis from Fearless (2000)
- "Kiss and Tell" (You Me at Six song), 2009
- "Kiss n Tell", a song by Kesha from Animal (2010)
- "Kiss & Tell", a song by Peter Andre from Accelerate (2010)
- "Kiss & Tell", a song by Justin Bieber from My World 2.0 (2010)
- "Kiss & Tell" (Angels & Airwaves song), 2019
- "Kiss N Tell" (Aespa song), 2026

== See also ==
- Kiss and Tell collective, a British Columbia-based performance and artist collective
