= Synk: Complaexity =

2026–2027 concert tour by Aespa

- Tour by Aespa
- Official poster
- Location: Asia; Europe; North America; South America
- Associated album: Lemonade
- Start date: August 7, 2026
- End date: February 2, 2027
- No. of shows: 30
- Website: aespaworldtour.com

Aespa concert chronology
- Synk: Aexis Line (2025–26); Synk: Complaexity (2026–27)

Synk: Complaexity is the ongoing fourth concert tour by South Korean girl group Aespa. The tour began on August 7, 2026, at the Gocheok Sky Dome in Seoul, South Korea, and is set to conclude on April 4, 2027, at the Kyocera Dome Osaka in Osaka, Japan.

== Background ==
On April 20, 2026, Aespa announced their second full-length album, Lemonade scheduled for release in May 2026. The following day, SM Entertainment revealed that Aespa would launch their fourth concert tour, set to begin after the conclusion of their previous tour, Synk: Aexis Line, in April. The new tour will open with two consecutive shows at the Gocheok Sky Dome in Seoul, South Korea, followed by a performance in Taipei, Taiwan, before continuing across Latin America and North America, while concluding in Europe in early 2027. On November 16, the Japanese dates were announced.

== Set list ==
This set list is taken from the August 7, 2026 show in Seoul, and is not intended to be representative of all shows.

1. "Lemonade"
2. "Switchblade"
3. "Whiplash"
4. "Black Mamba"
5. "WDA (Whole Different Animal)"
6. "Count On Me"
7. "Thirsty"
8. "Can't Help Myself"
9. "Angel #48"
10. "Camouflage"
11. "Kiss n Tell"
12. "Lollipop" (Giselle & Ningning)
13. "16 Bit" (Karina solo)
14. "Saddle Up" (Winter solo)
15. "ByeB4Hello" (Giselle solo)
16. "I Love You But I Gotta Let You Go" (Ningning solo)
17. "Serenade" (Karina & Winter)
18. "Armageddon"
19. "Bite"
20. "Drama"
21. "Next Level"
22. "Shakin'"
23. "Supernova"

Encore

24. "Yeppi Yeppi"
25. "My Plan"
26. "'Til We Die"

=== Alterations ===
- Starting from the São Paulo concert, "Thirsty", "Drama"" and "My Plan" were removed from the setlist. "Can't Help Myself" and "Camouflage" were swapped on the setlist.
- Winter was absent from the Dallas show due to a shingles diagnosis; as such, "Saddle Up" and "Serenade" were not performed.

== Tour dates ==
List of 2026 concerts
Date (2026)	City	Country	Venue	Attendance	Revenue
August 7	Seoul	South Korea	Gocheok Sky Dome	35,000	—
August 8	Seoul	South Korea	Gocheok Sky Dome	35,000	—
August 11	Taipei	Taiwan	Taipei Dome	37,000	—
September 4	São Paulo	Brazil	Mercado Livre Arena Pacaembu	106,000 (Note: For all 10 shows in September. The show in São Paulo attracted the attendance of 21,652.)	$11,400,000
September 6	Santiago	Chile	Santander Arena	106,000	$11,400,000
September 9	Lima	Peru	Costa 21	106,000	$11,400,000
September 11	Mexico City	Mexico	Palacio de los Deportes	106,000	$11,400,000
September 15	Hamilton	Canada	TD Coliseum	106,000	$11,400,000
September 18	Elmont (Note: Labelled as Belmont Park in promotional material)	United States	UBS Arena	106,000	$11,400,000
September 22	Washington, D.C.	United States	Capital One Arena	106,000	$11,400,000
September 24	Atlanta	United States	State Farm Arena	106,000	$11,400,000
September 26	Miami	United States	Kaseya Center	106,000	$11,400,000
September 29	Dallas	United States	American Airlines Center	106,000	$11,400,000
October 3	Inglewood (Note: Labelled as Los Angeles in promotional material)	United States	Intuit Dome	—	—
October 6	Oakland	United States	Oakland Arena	—	—
October 9	Seattle	United States	Climate Pledge Arena	—	—
October 11	Vancouver	Canada	Rogers Arena	11,000	—

List of 2027 concerts
Date (2027)	City	Country	Venue	Attendance	Revenue
January 14	Manchester	England	AO Arena	—	—
January 16	London	England	The O_{2} Arena	—	—
January 19	Amsterdam	Netherlands	Ziggo Dome	—	—
January 22	Stockholm	Sweden	Avicii Arena	—	—
January 24	Copenhagen	Denmark	Royal Arena	—	—
January 26	Berlin	Germany	Uber Arena	—	—
January 29	Milan	Italy	Unipol Dome	—	—
January 31	Barcelona	Spain	Palau Sant Jordi	—	—
February 2	Paris	France	Accor Arena	—	—
March 6	Tokyo	Japan	Tokyo Dome	—	—
March 7	Tokyo	Japan	Tokyo Dome	—	—
April 3	Osaka	Japan	Kyocera Dome Osaka	—	—
April 4	Osaka	Japan	Kyocera Dome Osaka	—	—
Total				—	—
