= Eider (brand) =

French climbing brand

- Type: Société par actions simplifiée
- Industry: Textile industry
- Founded: 1962
- Headquarters: Annecy, France
- Products: Clothing & Sports equipment
- Parent: K2 Korea
- Website: https://www.eider.com/

Eider is a French brand that specialises makes sports garments for mountaineering and ice climbing.

== History ==
Eider was founded in 1962. Eider became a subsidiary of Lafuma in June 2008. Eider, along with Lafuma, made advancements in the South Korean sports equipment market since 2009.

The Millet Group sold Eider to the South Korean group K2 in January 2020.
