= Kiss n Tell (Aespa song) =

Single by Aespa

from the EP Kiss n Tell
- Language: Japanese; English
- Released: July 24, 2026
- Genre: Dance-pop
- Length: 2:46
- Label: SM; Warner Music Japan
- Composers: Alna Hofmeyr; David Wilson; Rollo
- Lyricist: Mahiro
- Producer: Dwilly

Aespa singles chronology
"Lemonade" (2026)	"Kiss n Tell" (2026)

Music video
- "Kiss n Tell" on YouTube

"Kiss n Tell" is a song recorded by South Korean girl group Aespa for their first Japanese-language extended play of the same name. It was released as the EP's lead single by SM Entertainment and Warner Music Japan on July 24, 2026.

== Background and release ==
On June 10, 2026, SM Entertainment and Warner Music Japan announced that Aespa would release their first Japanese-language extended play titled Kiss n Tell on July 24. On July 21, the music video teaser was released. The song was released alongside its music video and the EP on July 24.

== Composition ==
"Kiss n Tell" was written by Mahiro and composed by Alna Hofmeyr, David Wilson, and Rollo, with Wilson serving as the producer under his stage name Dwilly. It's a house-influenced dance-pop song featuring piano-driven instrumentation and rhythmic beats. Lyrically, it depicts a relationship that grows stronger through sharing worries and supporting one another.

== Music video ==
The music video for "Kiss n Tell" was directed by Luke Casey for Core.A Creative Production. The music video is set against the backdrop of an amusement park and features Aespa's friendly and playful image, highlighting the song's signature choreography and colorful visuals.

== Promotion ==
Aespa performed the song for the first time during their fan meeting, My Classmaete, at Keio Arena Tokyo from July 18 to 20. They later performed the song on Fuji TV's Star on July 23. The song is currently included in the set list for their ongoing Synk: Complaexity tour.

== Track listing ==
Digital download and streaming – Taku Takahashi remix

1. Kiss n Tell (Taku Takahashi remix) – 3:33
2. Kiss n Tell – 2:46

== Charts ==
=== Weekly charts ===
Weekly chart performance
Chart (2026)	Peak position
Japan Hot 100 (Billboard)	32
Japan Streaming (Oricon)	38
New Zealand Hot Singles (RMNZ)	15
Singapore Regional (RIAS)	19
South Korea (Circle)	174

=== Monthly charts ===
Monthly chart performance
Chart (2026)	Peak position
South Korea (Circle)	191

== Release history ==
Release dates and formats
Region	Date	Format	Version	Label
Various	July 24, 2026	Digital download; streaming	Original	SM; Warner Music Japan
Various	November 20, 2026	Digital download; streaming	Taku Takahashi remix	SM; Warner Music Japan
