= Kiss n Tell (EP) =

- Digital and Poster version cover

EP by Aespa
- Released: July 24, 2026
- Length: 17:17
- Languages: English; Japanese
- Labels: SM; Warner Music Japan

Aespa chronology
Lemonade (2026)	Kiss n Tell (2026)	Synk: Aexis Line 2026 (2026)

Singles from Kiss n Tell
- 1. "Kiss n Tell" Released: July 24, 2026

Kiss n Tell is the first Japanese-language extended play and seventh overall by South Korean girl group Aespa. It was released by SM Entertainment and Warner Music Japan on July 24, 2026, and contains six tracks, including the lead single of the same name.

== Background and release ==
In January 2026, the song "In Halo" was featured in the Japanese television series Gimbab and Onigiri. In March, the song "Attitude" was released as the opening theme for TV Tokyo's anime series Kill Blue.

On June 10, 2026, SM Entertainment and Warner Japan announced that Aespa would release their first Japanese-language extended play titled Kiss n Tell on July 24, 2026. A series of teaser images were released between July 1 to July 10. The music video teaser for "Kiss n Tell" and teaser images were released on July 21. The extended play was released alongside the music video for the title track on July 24.

== Promotion ==
To promote the extended play, Aespa held a fan meeting titled My Classmaete at Keio Arena Tokyo from July 18 to 20, where they performed "Kiss n Tell" live for the first time. They later performed the song on Fuji TV's Star on July 23.

== Track listing ==
Track listing adapted from Apple Music.

Track listing for Kiss n Tell
No.	Title	Lyrics	Music	Arrangement	Length
1.	"Kiss n Tell"	Mahiro	Alna Hofmeyr; David Wilson; Rollo	Hanael; Dwilly	2:46
2.	"Orbit Pop"	Yamai	Arineh Karimi; Haring; Luke; BB Elliot	Haring; Luke	3:02
3.	"Fangirl"	Lauren Aquilina; RISC; Sarah Troy	Lauren Aquilina; RISC; Sarah Troy	Lauren Aquilina; RISC; Sarah Troy	2:44
4.	"Attitude"	Lauren Kaori	Edwin Lindberg; Lukas Hällgren; Wilhelmina	Edwin Lindberg; Lukas Hällgren; Wilhelmina	3:05
5.	"Done with Rules"	Masami Kakinuma	Aftrshok; Brown Panda; C'SA; Honey Noise; Strong Dragon	Aftrshok; Brown Panda; Honey Noise; Strong Dragon	2:16
6.	"In Halo"	Ryo Ito; Sorato; Tsingtao	Ryo Ito; Sorato; Tsingtao	Sorato	3:24
Total length:					17:17

== Charts ==
=== Weekly charts ===
Weekly chart performance for Kiss n Tell
Chart (2026)	Peak position
French Albums (SNEP)	41
Japanese Albums (Oricon)	2
Japanese Combined Albums (Oricon)	2
Japanese Hot Albums (Billboard Japan)	2

=== Monthly charts ===
Monthly chart performance for Kiss n Tell
Chart (2026)	Position
Japanese Albums (Oricon)	6

== Certifications ==
Certifications for Kiss n Tell
Region	Certification	Certified units/sales
Japan (RIAJ)	Gold	100,000^{^}
^{^} Shipments figures based on certification alone.

== Release history ==
Release history for Rich Man
Region	Date	Format	Label
Japan	July 24, 2026	CD	SM; Warner Music Japan
Various	July 24, 2026	Digital download; streaming	SM; Warner Music Japan
