= Aespa =

South Korean girl group

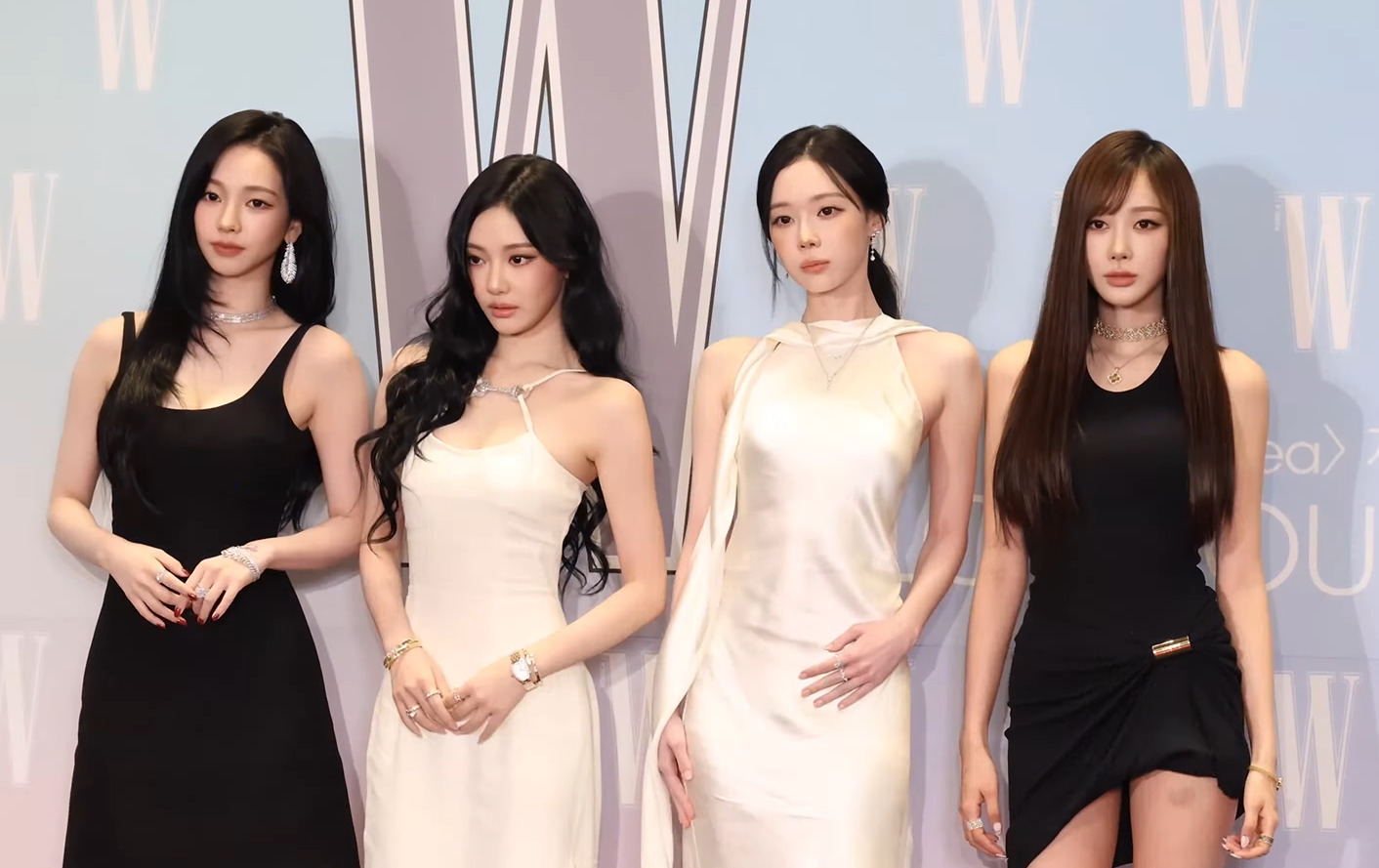
- Aespa in 2025; L–R: Karina, Ningning, Winter, and Giselle

Background information
- Origin: Seoul, South Korea
- Genres: K-pop; hip-hop; dance-pop; hyperpop
- Works: Discography; songs recorded; videography; live performances
- Years active: 2020–present
- Labels: SM; Warner; Capitol
- Member of: SM Town
- Members: Karina; Giselle; Winter; Ningning
- Website: aespa.com

Aespa (/ˈɛsˌpɑː/ ES-pah; Korean: 에스파; RR: Eseupa; stylized in all lowercase or as æspa) is a South Korean girl group formed by SM Entertainment. The group consists of four members: Karina, Giselle, Winter, and Ningning. The group is known for popularizing the metaverse concept and hyperpop music in K-pop. Aespa debuted on November 17, 2020, with the single "Black Mamba", which achieved the highest number of views in 24 hours for a K-pop group's debut video. Their third single, "Next Level", was released in May 2021 to widespread commercial and critical success, peaking at number two on the Circle Digital Chart and earning the daesang (Note: A daesang (대상; lit. 'grand prize') is the highest honor given out at South Korean music award ceremonies in recognition of the artist(s) with the greatest physical and digital achievements for the year.) for Song of the Year at the 19th Korean Music Awards. In October of the same year, Aespa released their first extended play (EP) Savage, which became the highest-charting debut album by a K-pop girl group on the US Billboard 200 chart at number 20, while its lead single peaked at number two in South Korea.

In July 2022, Aespa released their second EP Girls, which broke the record for the best-selling album by a K-pop girl group in history and became the first to sell one million copies in the first week of release. It also debuted at number three on the Billboard 200 chart, marking their first top-ten album in the US. Their third EP, My World, was released in May 2023, achieving over two million sales and becoming their second top-ten album on the Billboard 200. The group released their first studio album, Armageddon, in May 2024. It was preceded by the commercially successful lead single "Supernova", which topped the Circle Digital Chart for eleven weeks and won Song of the Year at the 2024 MAMA Awards and 2024 Melon Music Awards. In October 2024, the lead single of Aespa's fifth EP Whiplash became their first top-ten hit on the Billboard Global 200 at number eight, while their 2025 single "Dirty Work" entered the top five of the chart.

== Career ==
=== 2016–2019: Pre-debut activities ===
Aespa's official logo

Ningning was introduced as a member of pre-debut training team SM Rookies on September 19, 2016. As part of the team, she appeared on the Rookies Princess: Who's the Best? segment of the program My SMT that year and recorded several covers for the Korean animated TV program Shining Star in 2017.

Karina appeared in labelmate Taemin's music video for the song "Want" in February 2019 and performed with him on several music programs in the following weeks. Karina also appeared alongside labelmate Kai for a performance in Hyundai and SM Entertainment's collaboration virtual showcase — The All-New Tucson, Beyond DRIVE.

Aespa's logo was also teased at the end of SuperM's "One (Monster & Infinity)" music video.

=== 2020–2021: Introduction, debut, "Next Level", and Savage ===
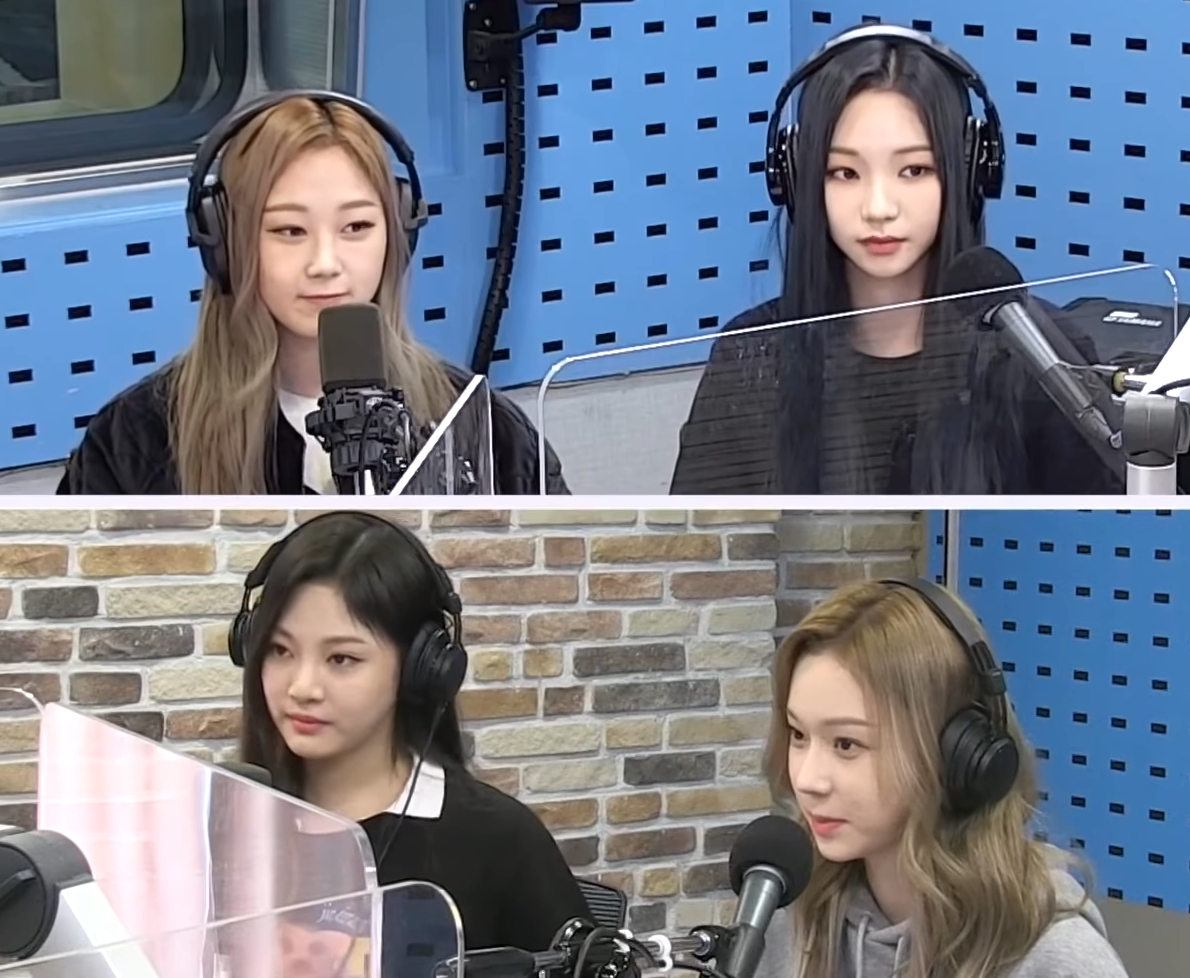
Aespa at SBS Power FM in 2020

On October 26, 2020, SM Entertainment announced that it would debut a new girl group, its first since Red Velvet in 2014 and its first overall idol group since NCT in 2016. The group's name and members were revealed individually starting on October 27 (in order: Winter, Karina, Ningning, and Giselle). The group's name, Aespa, combines the English initials for "avatar" and "experience" (Avatar X Experience) with the English word "aspect", meaning "two sides", to symbolize the idea of "meeting another self and experiencing the new world". SM Entertainment founder Lee Soo-man explained the group's concept at the 2020 World Cultural Industry Forum on October 28. A video trailer featuring all four members was revealed on November 2, alongside the announcement of the release of Aespa's debut single, "Black Mamba", on November 17. Upon release, the song's music video achieved the highest number of views for a K-pop group's debut video in 24 hours, with 21.4 million views. The group made their broadcast debut on KBS2's Music Bank on November 20 to perform "Black Mamba", and earned their first music show win on SBS's Inkigayo on January 17, 2021.

On January 29, 2021, SM Entertainment announced Aespa would release a remake of "Forever", the single originally by Yoo Young-jin for SM Entertainment's 2000 holiday album Winter Vacation in SMTOWN.com. Aespa's version of the song, a "mid-tempo ballad characterized by acoustic guitar sound" with "warm lyrics about promising forever to a loved one", was released on February 5.

On May 4, SM Entertainment announced Aespa would release a new single titled "Next Level", a dance and hip-hop track with a "groovy" rap, "energetic" bass, and "powerful vocals". It was released on May 17. It debuted at number nine on the Gaon Digital Chart and peaked at number two, becoming their first top five hit in South Korea. It also peaked at number two on the Billboard K-pop Hot 100 chart. "Next Level" became Aespa's third song to chart on the Billboard World Digital Song Sales chart, peaking at number three. On July 22, it was announced that Aespa had signed with Creative Artists Agency for their future activities in the United States. On September 10, it was announced that remix versions of "Next Level" will be released on September 14, along with a music video and a visualizer video for "Next Level (IMLAY Remix)".

On September 14, SM Entertainment announced Aespa would release their first extended play, Savage. The extended play contains six tracks, including the lead single of the same name. It was released on October 5 to critical acclaim and commercial success, with media outlets praising "Savage" for its "addictive" hooks, refrains, and "masterfully layered" production. The song was included in multiple year-end lists such as NME and Time magazine's top 10 best K-pop songs of 2021, calling "Savage" an "explosive" track. Commercially, the song peaked at number two on the Gaon Digital Chart and became their second top-five single in South Korea. On October 15, ten days after release, at 1:30 p.m. KST, Instiz's iChart, announced Aespa's first perfect all-kill, as "Savage" had reached number one on the real-time, daily, and weekly components of the domestic charts — iChart, Melon, Genie, FLO, Bugs!, and Vibe — becoming the first "fourth generation" K-pop act to do so. The song won eight music show awards including three non-consecutive wins on Inkigayo that led to receiving the "triple crown" award. Savage debuted atop the Gaon Album Chart and also marked Aespa's first entry on the US Billboard 200 at number 20, making Aespa the highest charting K-pop rookie girl group to appear on the latter chart. Savage has sold a total of 788,959 copies and held the record for the highest-selling debut album by an SM Entertainment act, until it was surpassed by NCT DoJaeJung's Perfume in May 2023.

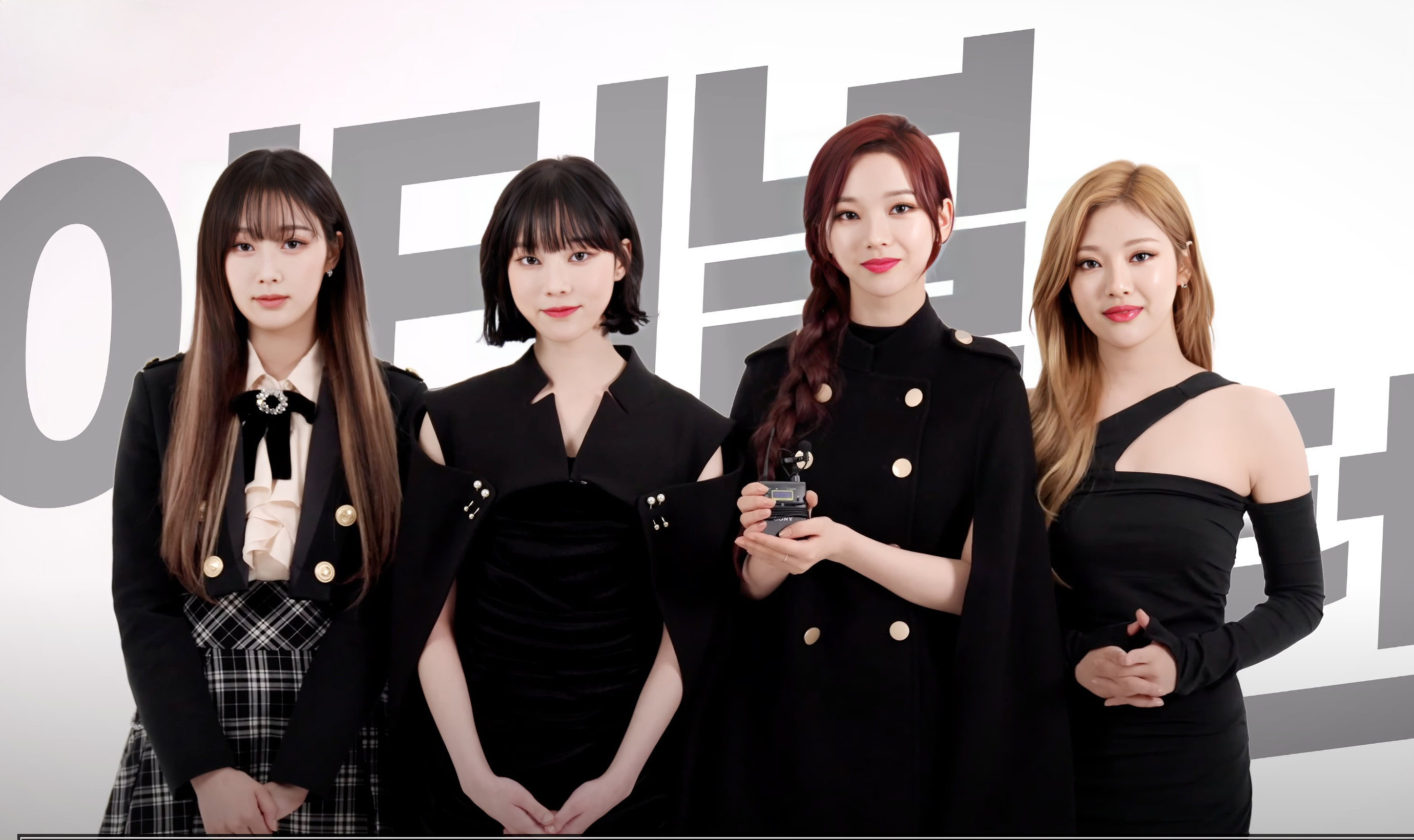
Aespa for Eternal Return

On October 13, Aespa was included in People magazine's Ones to Watch 2021 list as a "Rising Star". On November 25, the group performed on a float, celebrating women in STEM, at the 95th Macy's Thanksgiving Day Parade, making them the first Korean girl group to perform at the parade. On December 2, they won their first Daesang (Stage of the Year) at the Asia Artist Awards. Two days later, on December 4, the group won their second Daesang (Record of the Year) at the 2021 Melon Music Awards. On November 4, it was announced that Aespa would be releasing a remake of S.E.S.'s "Dreams Come True" on December 20 for SM's Remastering Project and as the lead single of the SM Town album, 2021 Winter SM Town: SMCU Express. The music video for the song was directed by Lucid Colour and choreographed and visually directed by BoA. The song peaked at number eight on the Gaon Digital Chart and at number seven on the Billboard World Digital Songs chart.

On December 26, Karina and Winter were revealed as members of the supergroup Got the Beat. The supergroup debuted with the single "Step Back" on January 3, 2022.

=== 2022: Coachella, international expansion, and Girls ===
On January 8, 2022, Aespa became the inaugural winner of the Artist of the Year award at the 36th Golden Disc Awards. On March 1, they won the Song of the Year award for "Next Level" at the 19th Korean Music Awards. On April 19, it was announced that Aespa would be performing at Coachella on April 23, becoming the third K-pop girl group to perform at the festival. They performed as part of 88rising's Head in the Clouds Forever set for the second week. Their setlist included "Savage", "Next Level", "Black Mamba", and an English version of a then-unreleased song titled "Life's Too Short", which was revealed to be from their then-upcoming EP. On May 12, the group was included in Time magazine's Next Generation Leaders list. The magazine noted Aespa as an "experimental but essential player in the music industry, acting as a bridge between the reality and virtual". On May 27, the group was included on Forbes' 30 Under 30 Asia list.

On June 1, SM Entertainment announced that Aespa had signed with Warner Records. They also announced that Aespa would release their second extended play, Girls, on July 8. The extended play contains nine tracks, including the lead single of the same name, their first two singles, "Black Mamba" and "Forever", and "Dreams Come True", which they previously released as part of the 2021 Winter SM Town: SMCU Express album in December 2021. Two other tracks on Girls, "Illusion" and the English version of "Life's Too Short", preceded the EP and were released on June 1 and 24, respectively. Pre-orders for Girls exceeded 1,610,000 copies prior to its release, the highest figure for a girl group album in K-pop at the time. Upon release, the album became the first by a girl group to sell more than one million copies in one week on the Hanteo Chart, exceeding the mark set by Blackpink's The Album in October 2020. It went on to debut at number one on the Circle Album Chart with 1,426,487 copies sold, leading to their first Million certification by the Korea Music Content Association. It also topped the monthly Circle Album Chart for July with 1,645,255 copies sold, which marked the largest monthly and total album sales by any K-pop girl group album in history; the record was broken in September by Blackpink's album Born Pink. On the U.S. Billboard 200 chart, Girls debuted at number three with 56,000 album-equivalent units, 53,000 pure album sales, becoming the top-selling album of the week.

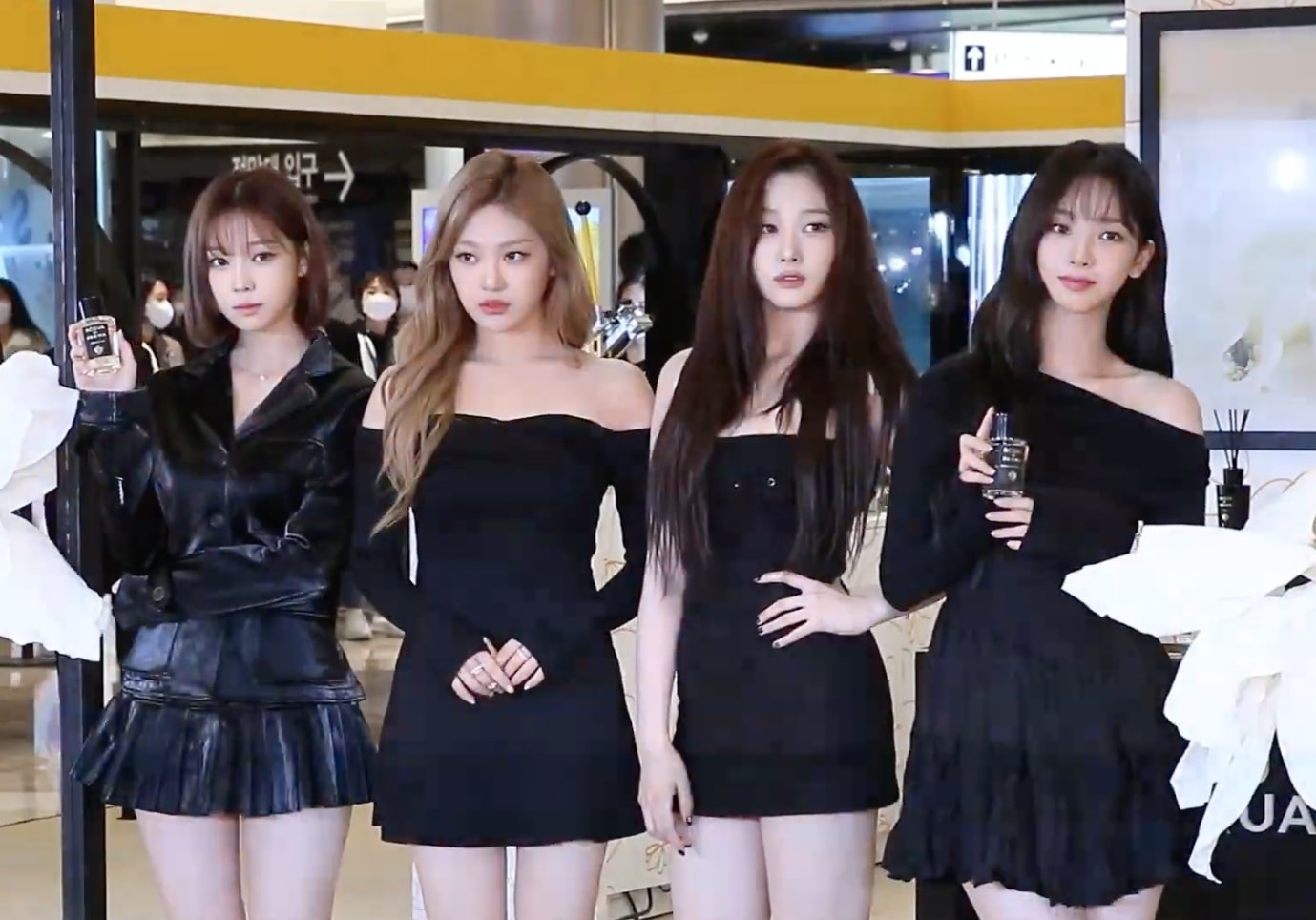
Aespa at the Acqua di Parma pop-up store opening

SM Entertainment also announced the group's first Japanese showcase, titled: Aespa Japan Premium Showcase 2022 ~SYNK~, which was held on August 6 and 7 at the Pia Arena MM in Yokohama. On June 7, it was announced that Aespa would be holding their second showcase, their first in the United States, titled: Aespa Showcase SYNK in LA! on June 26 at the YouTube Theater. On June 14, an additional show was announced, for June 27, after the tickets for June 26 sold out. The group was also named the Apple Music Up Next artist for June.

On July 5, Aespa delivered a speech and performed at the United Nations High-level Political Forum on Sustainable Development. On July 8, Aespa performed at Good Morning America's Summer Concert Series in Central Park, which featured the first performance of "Girls". On October 23, Aespa performed virtually for Crocs to celebrate their 20th Anniversary on the video game Roblox. It drew the second-highest attendance at a one-time Roblox concert, with 2.5 million visits. The show also drove over 2.3 million recorded visits to the Crocs World in Roblox. On December 14, the group released a collaborative single, "Beautiful Christmas", with labelmates Red Velvet for SM Town's album, 2022 Winter SM Town: SMCU Palace.

On December 28, Aespa released the first episode of their first reality show, Aespa's Synk Road, which documented their trip to Pyeongchang in the Gangwon Province. Throughout the show, the members were tasked to find hidden 'ae-key' cards, won from various missions and games, in order to 'complete' the eponymous Synk Road.

=== 2023: First concert tour, My World, and Drama ===
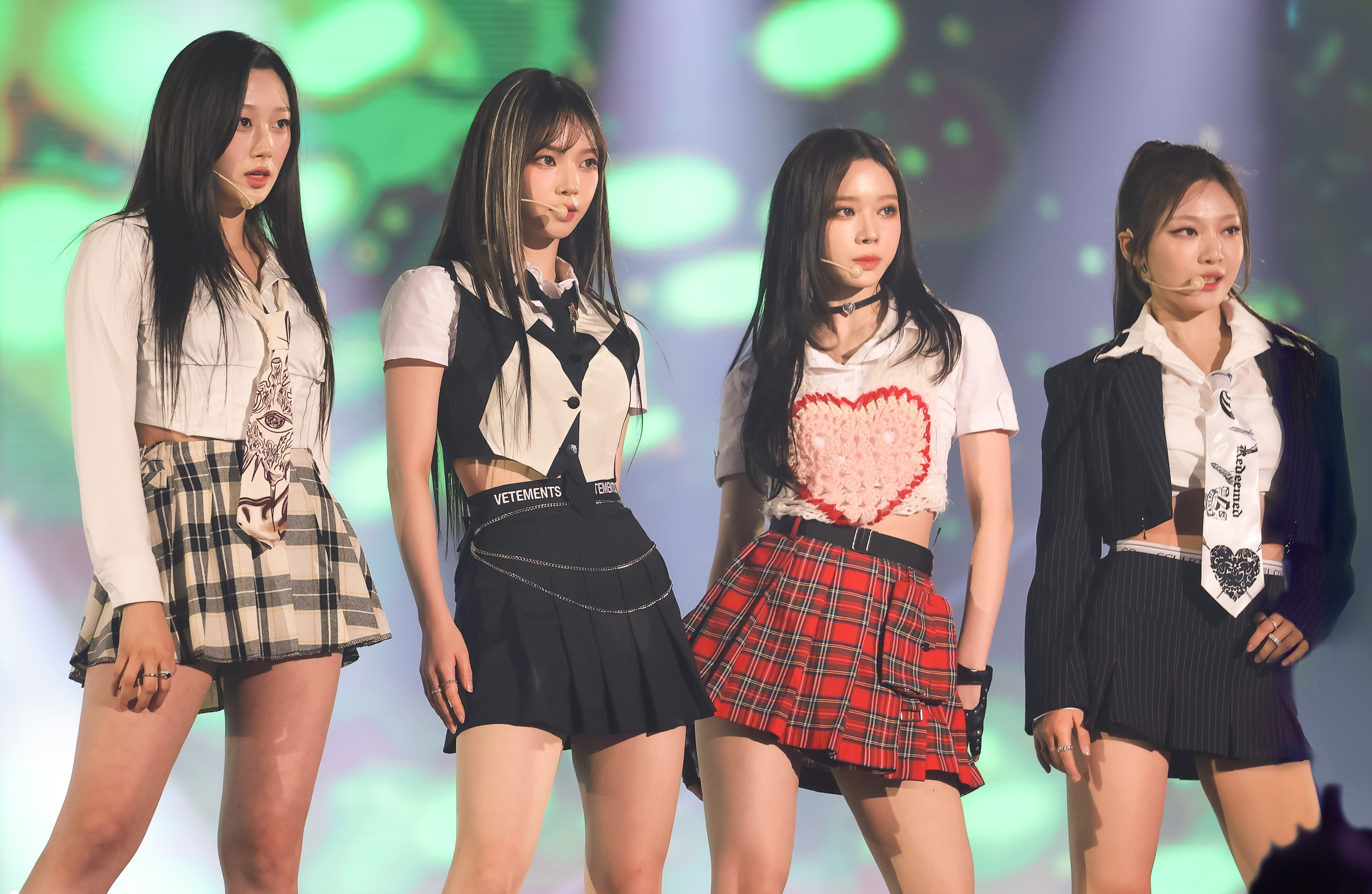
Aespa at the 2023 Circle Chart Music Awards

On February 25 and 26, they held their first concert, Synk: Hyper Line, at the Jamsil Arena in Seoul, South Korea. On March 7, the group was announced as a performer at the Outside Lands Music and Arts Festival in San Francisco, California, on August 11, making them the first K-pop group to perform at the festival. From March to April, Aespa continued their Synk: Hyper Line concert tour in Japan, garnering a total of 110,000 spectators from 10 sold-out shows across Osaka, Tokyo, Saitama, and Aichi. During their concert at the Yoyogi National Gymnasium in Tokyo, it was announced that the group would return on August 5 and 6 for a two-day special concert at the Tokyo Dome, making them the fastest K-pop artist and the first "fourth generation" K-pop act to hold a solo concert at the stadium.

On March 29, SM Entertainment announced that Aespa would release a new single titled "Hold on Tight", an "addictive" techno-genre track that sampled the melody of the iconic Tetris theme song, "Korobeiniki", for the soundtrack of the Apple Original Film Tetris. The single officially released on March 31.

On May 8, Aespa released their third extended play My World. The extended play contains six tracks, with the single "Welcome to My World" pre-released on May 2 and the lead single "Spicy" released alongside the EP. My World debuted at number one on the Circle Album Chart with 1,420,178 copies sold. Two weeks after its release, the album became "a double million-seller" selling 2,011,388 copies and became the second album by a female Korean act to sell over two million copies. The album was then certified 2× Million by the Korea Music Content Association on July 6. On the U.S. Billboard 200 chart, My World debuted at number nine with 40,000 album-equivalent units, 1.33 million on-demand streams and 39,000 pure album sales, becoming their second top 10 entry.

On May 10, SM Entertainment announced that Aespa's Synk: Hyper Line tour would continue with a show in Jakarta, Indonesia on June 24. On May 19, an additional 14 shows were announced, extending the tour to North America, South America, and Europe.

On May 23, Aespa attended the 2023 Cannes Film Festival as ambassadors for the Swiss jewelry brand Chopard. They attended Chopard's Annual Dinner and Love Party which showcased Chopard's co-president and artistic director Caroline Scheufele's first Haute couture collection. The next day, Aespa attended the red carpet for the screening of La Passion de Dodin Bouffant and showcased the brand's new jewelry collection, Red Carpet Collection. On June 8, Aespa threw the first pitch for the New York Yankees against the Chicago White Sox at the Yankee Stadium.

On June 10, Aespa performed at the annual Governors Ball Music Festival in New York City, making them the first K-pop act to perform at the festival. Giselle was unable to perform with the group due to health issues. The group's set was well received by both fans and critics alike, with Simon Vozick-Levinson of Rolling Stone calling the show a "spectacle" and Starr Bowenbank of Billboard noting that Aespa's "stage presence and catalog has the strength to carry the main stage at a music festival".

On July 27, Aespa began teasing their English digital single "Better Things", a "minimal up-tempo dance" song, which was released on August 18. Promotions included a 3 episode long web series sitcom show, Better Things, with the first episode uploaded on August 7. Ningning only appeared in limited parts of the sitcom, due to her health conditions at the time of filming. Aespa first performed the single on August 13, at the Crypto.com Arena in Los Angeles, for the first show in the US leg of their Synk: Hyper Line tour.

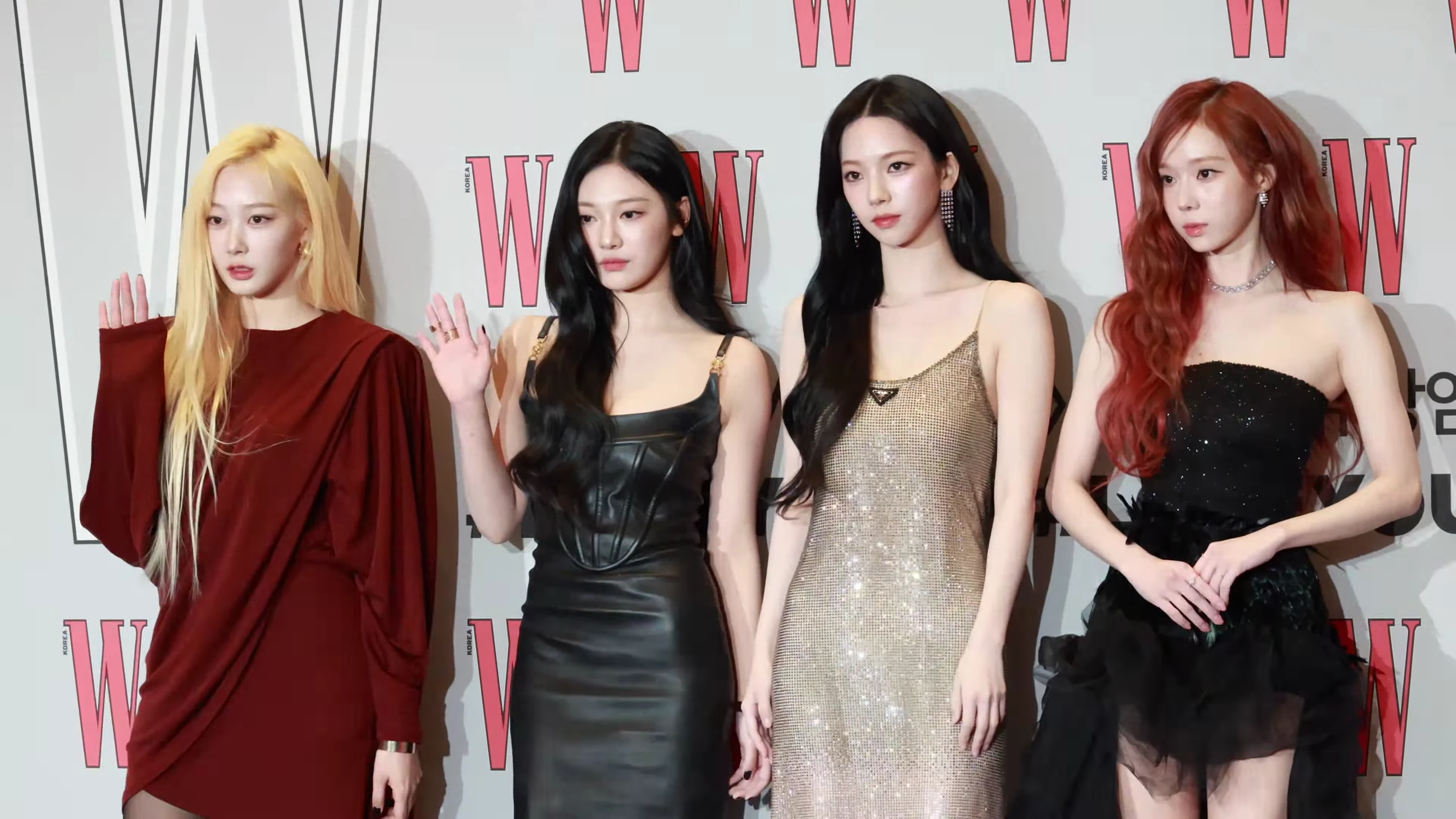
Aespa in November 2023

On August 23, Aespa released the single "We Go". The single served as the inaugural opening theme song for the Korean edition of the Pokémon: Liko and Roy's Departure anime, which began airing on the same day. The single contains lyrics about the new protagonists, Liko and Roy, discovering 'precious' things and growing through adventure.

On October 6, Aespa released the single "Zoom Zoom", which was served as the ending theme song for Beyblade X anime. On October 10, Aespa announced they would be releasing their fourth extended play Drama on November 10. The extended play contains six tracks, including the lead single of the same name.

=== 2024–2025: Second concert tour, Armageddon, and subsequent releases ===
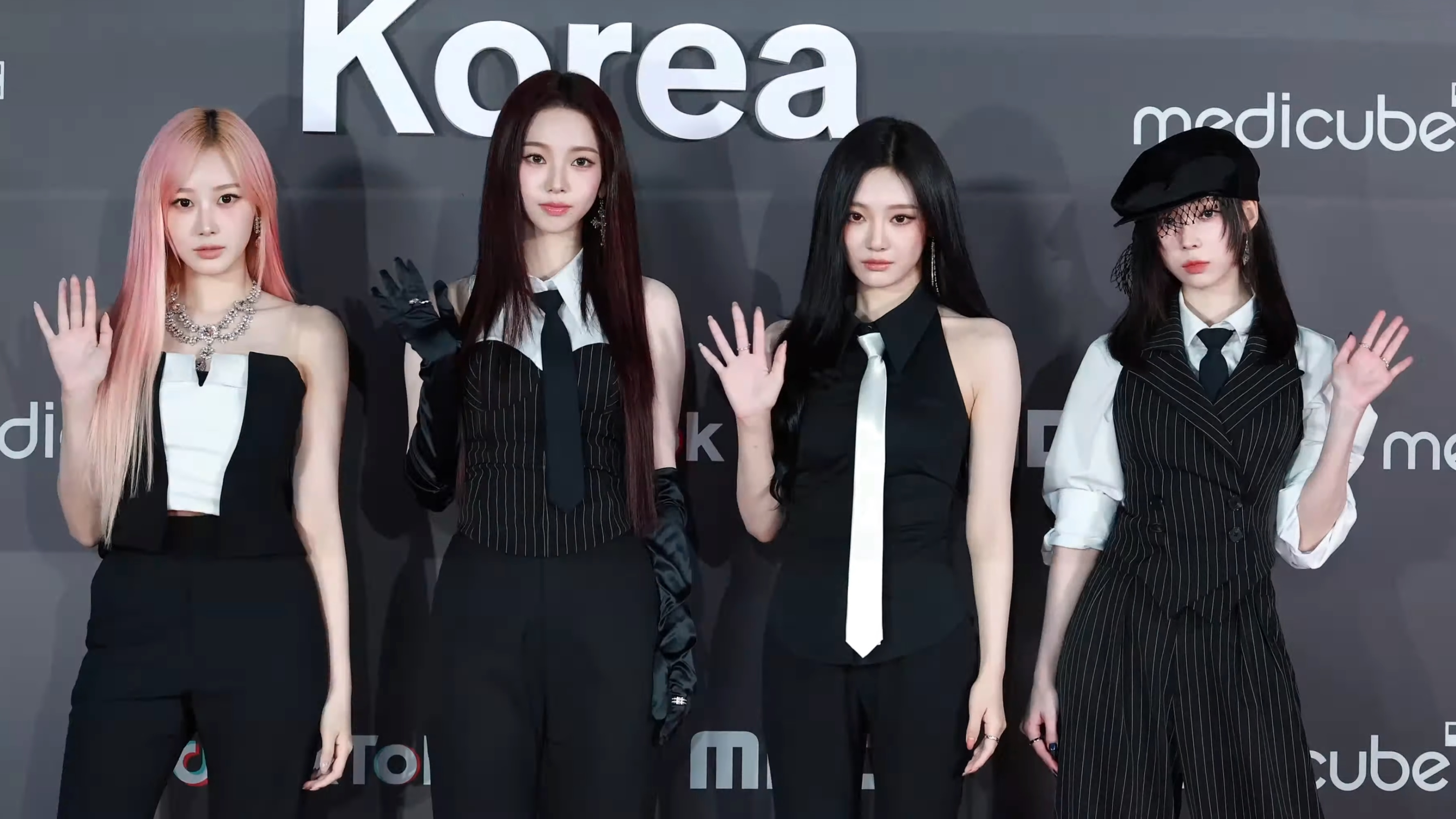
Aespa in November 2024

On January 9, 2024, SM Entertainment announced that Aespa would be releasing a remake of "Regret of the Times", a single originally by Seo Taiji and Boys. The remake was released on January 15. On February 19, it was announced that Aespa would be embarking on their second world tour, Synk: Parallel Line, kicking off in Seoul on June 29 and 30.

On April 21, it was announced that Aespa would be releasing their first studio album Armageddon on May 27. The album is led by two singles "Supernova", which was pre-released on May 13, and "Armageddon", which was released together with the entire album. "Supernova" was a commercial success in South Korea and achieved perfect all-kill status, as it simultaneously reached number one on the real-time, daily, and weekly components of iChart. It became the group's first song to top the Circle Digital Chart, and their first top-ten hit on the Billboard Global Excl. U.S. chart, peaking at number six.

On June 3, it was announced that Aespa would be releasing their first Japanese single "Hot Mess" on July 3. The single marked the group's Japanese debut and includes two other songs "Sun and Moon" and "Zoom Zoom", the latter previously released on October 6, 2023, as the ending theme song to the anime series and franchise Beyblade X. Later on June 29 and 30, when kicking off their second world tour at Jamsil Indoor Stadium, Aespa revealed four solo tracks, one from each member. The solo tracks were later released in Synk: Parallel Line, their first digital single album, on October 9. Despite not having officially debuted as a soloist, Karina went on to win a solo music show award for the first time at Show! Music Core for her solo track, "Up", on October 19.

On September 23, it was announced that Aespa would be releasing their fifth extended play Whiplash on October 21, containing six tracks including the lead single of the same name. On November 15, the group won the Artist of the Year award at the inaugural TikTok Awards Korea event.

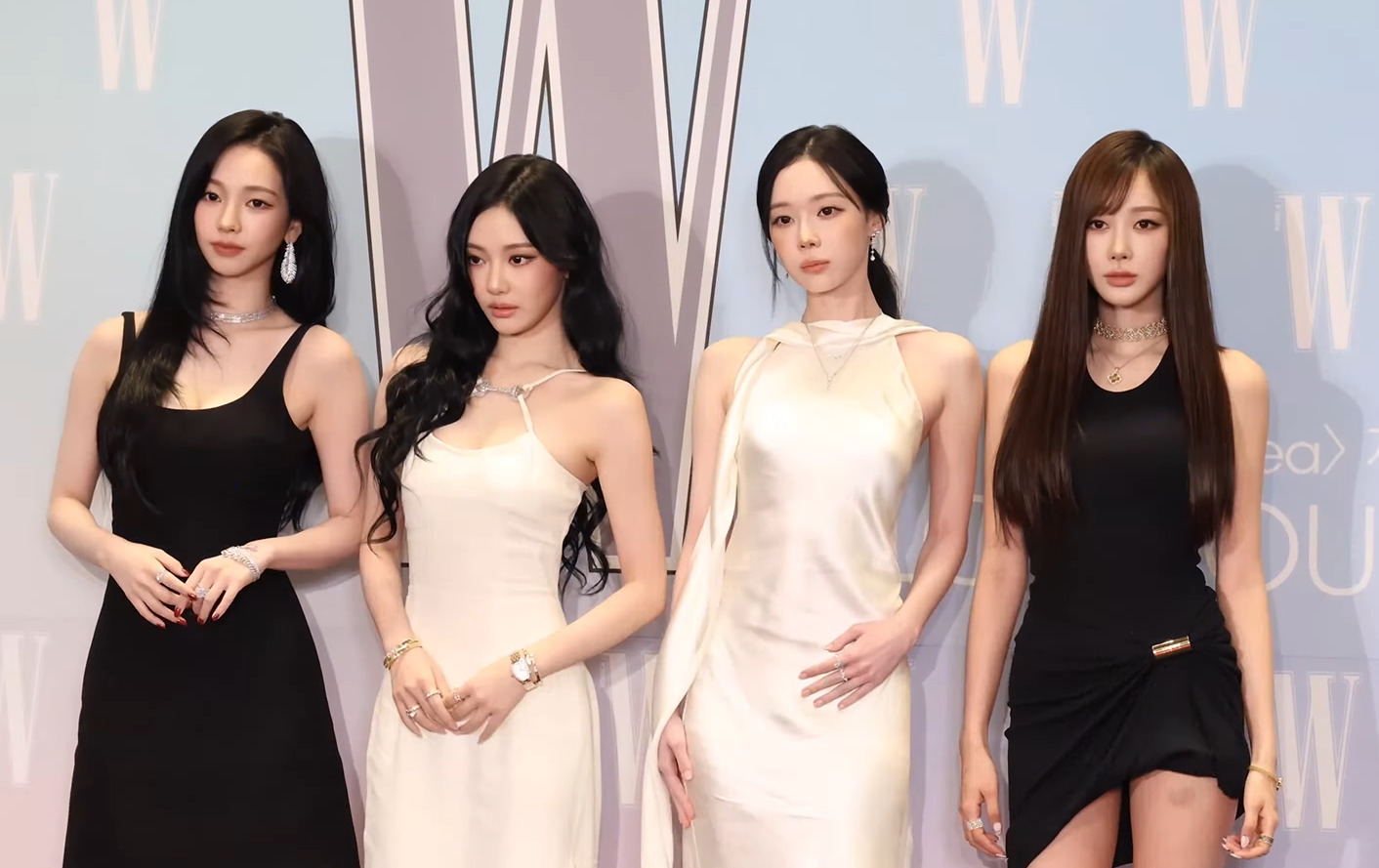
Aespa in October 2025

On June 5, 2025, it was announced that Aespa's second single album Dirty Work would be released on June 27, with the lead single of the same name. On August 4, it was announced that Aespa's sixth extended play Rich Man would be released on September 5, with the lead single of the same name. The EP is the group's first release in association with Capitol Music Group, in a partnership established with SM Entertainment. The group performed "Rich Man" on The Jennifer Hudson Show broadcast on September 24.

=== 2026–present: Lemonade ===
On March 13, 2026, SM Entertainment officially announced that Aespa is preparing its second studio album with the goal of a comeback in May. On March 18, Lollapalooza announced that Aespa will perform at the Chicago festival in August. On April 20, it was announced that Aespa would be releasing their second studio album Lemonade on May 29, featuring eleven tracks. The album is led by two singles "WDA (Whole Different Animal)" featuring G-Dragon of BigBang, which was pre-released on May 11, and the lead single of the same name, which was released together with the entire album. On July 24, Aespa released their first Japanese extended play Kiss n Tell, with the lead single of the same name. On November 13, Aespa released a new version of "Santa Baby", incorporating Eartha Kitt's original vocals alongside the group's vocals, to commemorate the centenary of her birth on January 17, 2027.

== Other ventures ==
=== Endorsements ===
On February 10, 2021, Aespa became ambassador for Givenchy, the first K-pop artist chosen as such by the French fashion house. Later that year in August, Aespa inked endorsement deals with Korean cosmetics brand Clio, Korean skincare brand Mediheal, French sportswear brand Eider, and in September for KB Kookmin Bank. In November, Aespa was selected as muse for Italian fragrance brand Acqua di Parma, and Mobile RPG Eternal Return announced collaboration with Aespa.

On April 8, 2022, Aespa became the model for Korean beverage brand Lotte Chilsung's Tamz Zero. In August, Aespa became the global ambassador for the Korean sportswear brand MLB, and selected as new model for Lotte Duty Free. On September 1, Aespa became the global ambassador for Swiss watch and jewelry brand Chopard, and was featured in advertisement for Intel. In December, Aespa became promotional models for mobile game Epic Seven.

In October 2023, Crocs released collaboration Aespa x Crocs Stomp Lined Clog. On December 8, 2023, Lifestyle brand Urban Sophistication announced a limited-edition capsule collaboration with K-pop group Aespa. The capsule collection consists of three iPhone cases named: æconic, Synk Dive and Drama, which all feature Aespa's signature Aurora color and black color inspired by the scene of the "Drama" music video.

In February 2024, Aespa became the ambassador for Indonesian food brand Nabati Richoco. On February 28, South Korean cosmetics company Amorepacific selected Aespa as their new global ambassador for Mise-en-scène. In May, Aespa has been appointed as Incheon International Airport's honorary ambassador, and became the model for the new brand Refrear Series contact lens "a-eye".

In June 2025, Aespa released a new single, "Dirty Work", in collaboration with Hyundai Steel. The music video teaser for the song was filmed at the Hyundai Steel Dangjin Steelworks. The group also partnered with Apple to release a performance video for "Dirty Work", filmed entirely on the iPhone 16 Pro. On July 8, 2025, PUBG: Battlegrounds launched a collaboration with Aespa through Update 36.2. The collaboration featured in-game content including costume sets, weapon skins, emote packs, and sprays themed around the group. A new lobby music track titled "PNC 2025 Anthem (Aespa – Dark Arts)" was added and set as the default background music. A collaboration with the fighting game Street Fighter 6 was released in July 2025, featuring in-game cosmetics based on the group.

=== Philanthropy ===
On February 1, 2025, during the group's Los Angeles performance for Synk: Parallel Line, Aespa announced that they would donate some of the proceeds from the show to victims of the January 2025 Southern California wildfires. In November 2025, Aespa pledged HK$500,000 for victims of the 2025 Tai Po apartment fire in Hong Kong.

== Members ==
- Karina (카리나) – leader, dancer, rapper, vocalist
- Giselle (지젤) – rapper, vocalist
- Winter (윈터) – vocalist, dancer
- Ningning (닝닝) – vocalist, dancer

== Discography ==
- Armageddon (2024)
- Lemonade (2026)

== Filmography ==
Films

- Aespa: MY First Page (2024)
- Aespa: World Tour in Cinemas (2024)

Web shows

- Aespa's Synk Road (2022)
- Better Things (2023)
- Who Visit the Villa? (2023)
- Aesparty (2024–2026)
- Dirty Workshop (2025)
- School of Rich (2025)

== Tours and concerts ==
=== Headlining tours ===
- Synk: Hyper Line (2023)
- Synk: Parallel Line (2024–2025)
- Synk: Aexis Line (2025–2026)
- Synk: Complaexity (2026–2027)

=== Showcase ===
- Synk (2022)

=== Concert participation ===
- SM Town Live "Culture Humanity" (2021)
- SM Town Live 2022: SMCU Express at Kwangya (2022)
- SM Town Live 2022: SMCU Express (2022)
- SM Town Live 2023: SMCU Palace (2023–2024)
- SM Town Live 2025: The Culture, the Future (2025–2026)

=== Festivals ===
- Coachella (2022) (Note: Aespa performed during 88Rising's set, only on the second weekend of the festival.)
- Governors Ball (2023)
- Outside Lands (2023)
- Mawazine (2025)
- Lollapalooza (2026)

== See also ==
- Naevis – Virtual idol associated with Aespa
- List of best-selling girl group albums
