= Hot Mess (Aespa song) =

- Digital and "Hot Mess" version cover

Single by Aespa
- Language: Japanese; English
- B-side: "Sun and Moon"; "Zoom Zoom"
- Released: July 3, 2024
- Genre: Dance
- Length: 3:12
- Label: SM; Warner Japan
- Composers: Kenzie; Moonshine; Moa "Cazzi Opeia" Carlebecker; Ellen Berg
- Lyricist: H.Toyosaki

Aespa singles chronology
"Armageddon" (2024)	"Hot Mess" (2024)	"Whiplash" (2024)

Music video
- "Hot Mess" on YouTube

"Hot Mess" is a song recorded by South Korean girl group Aespa for their Japanese debut maxi single of the same name. It was released as a CD single by SM Entertainment and Warner Music Japan on July 3, 2024.

== Background and release ==
On June 3, 2024, SM Entertainment announced that Aespa would be making their Japanese debut with the maxi single titled "Hot Mess" on July 3. The maxi single features three tracks including "Hot Mess". The song was released alongside its music video and the maxi single on July 3.

== Composition ==
"Hot Mess" was written by H.Toyosaki, composed and arranged by Kenzie and Moonshine, with Moa "Cazzi Opeia" Carlebecker and Ellen Berg participating in the composition. It was described as a "high-energy" dance song featuring "distinctive saxophone rhythm" with lyrics "containing a message of independence".

== Track listing ==
Track listing for "Hot Mess"
No.	Title	Lyrics	Music	Arrangement	Length
1.	"Hot Mess"	H.Toyosaki	Kenzie; Moonshine; Moa "Cazzi Opeia" Carlebecker; Ellen Berg	Kenzie; Moonshine	3:12
2.	"Sun and Moon"	Kanata Okajima; Jamil Kazmi; Soma Genda; Ereca	Soma Genda; Dirty Orange; Ereca	Dirty Orange; Soma Genda	3:20
3.	"Zoom Zoom"	Jamesy Minimal; Yui Mugino; Soma Genda	Soma Genda; Dirty Orange; Yui Mugino	Dirty Orange; Soma Genda	3:13
Total length:					9:45

== Credits and personnel ==
Credits adapted from the single's liner notes.

Studio

- SM Wavelet Studio – recording, digital editing
- Doobdoob Studio – recording
- Klang Studio – mixing
- Sterling Sound – mastering

Personnel

- Aespa – vocals
- H.Toyosaki – lyrics
- Kenzie – composition, arrangement
- Moonshine – composition, arrangement
- Moa "Cazzi Opeia" Carlebecker – composition
- Ellen Berg – composition
- No2zcat – vocal directing
- Kwon Ae-jin – background vocals
- Kang Eun-ji – recording, digital editing
- Eugene Kwon – recording
- Gu Jong-pil – mixing
- Chris Gehringer – mastering

== Charts ==
=== Weekly charts ===
Weekly chart performance for "Hot Mess"
Chart (2024)	Peak position
Japan (Japan Hot 100)	6
Japan (Oricon)	2
Japan Combined Singles (Oricon)	2
South Korea Download (Circle)	103

=== Monthly charts ===
Monthly chart performance for "Hot Mess"
Chart (2024)	Position
Japan (Oricon)	9

=== Year-end charts ===
Year-end chart performance for "Hot Mess"
Chart (2024)	Position
Japan Top Singles Sales (Billboard Japan)	54
Japan (Oricon)	56

== Certifications ==
Certifications for "Hot Mess"
Region	Certification	Certified units/sales
Japan (RIAJ)	Platinum	250,000^{^}
^{^} Shipments figures based on certification alone.

== Release history ==
Release history for "Hot Mess"
Region	Date	Format	Label
Japan	July 3, 2024	CD	SM; Warner Japan
Various	July 3, 2024	Digital download; streaming	SM; Warner Japan
