= Armageddon (Aespa album) =

- Digital cover

Studio album by Aespa
- Released: May 27, 2024
- Genre: Pop
- Length: 31:02
- Languages: Korean; English
- Labels: SM; Kakao; Virgin
- Producers: Caesar & Loui; Mike Daley; Dem Jointz; Edvard Erfjord; Kenzie; Gil Lewis; MinGtion; Moonshine; No Identity; Stian Nyhammer Olsen; Mitchell Owens; PhD

Aespa chronology
Drama (2023)	Armageddon (2024)	Synk: Parallel Line (2024)

Singles from Armageddon
- 1. "Supernova" Released: May 13, 2024; 2. "Armageddon" Released: May 27, 2024

Armageddon is the first studio album by South Korean girl group Aespa. It was released by SM Entertainment on May 27, 2024, and contains ten tracks including two singles, "Supernova" and "Armageddon".

== Background and release ==
On April 22, 2024, SM Entertainment announced that Aespa would be releasing their first studio album titled Armageddon. It was also announced that the album would feature two singles: "Supernova" and "Armageddon", with the former releasing on May 13 and the latter, along with the album, on May 27. On May 2, the promotional schedule was revealed in a trailer titled "Launch Code". Eight days later, the track listing was revealed alongside a highlight medley teaser video. On May 12, the music video teaser for "Supernova" was released. "Supernova" was released along with its music video on May 13. The teaser videos for "Long Chat", "Licorice", and "Live My Life", were released from May 15 to 17. A CDP version of Armageddon that includes a CD player will be released on July 19.

== Composition ==
Featuring ten tracks, Armageddon, is a pop effort that incorporates various genres of hip hop, dance and ballads. The first track, "Supernova", is a "glittering cosmic" dance and hyper-pop song characterized by "heavy kick and bass", "catchy top line", and "synth melody" with lyrics about "Aespa's expanded world view by comparing the beginning of an event that opens a door to another dimension to a supernova, expressing the beginning of a big explosion". The second track, "Armageddon", is a hip hop and dance song described as "old-school yet trendy track" with a "fluid R&B bridge" and lyrics containing the message that "I can only define myself". The "thumping" tune, "Set the Tone", is a hip-hop track with "exhilarating punches of synthesizers". The fourth song, "Mine", sees the group "reflecting on growing up with fear and feeling like the 'fake portrait' that was their reflection in a 'broken mirror' was 'going to swallow me up'", but ultimately "standing tall" despite their worries.

The fifth track, "Licorice", is a dance song featuring "an addictive churning rock-pop hook" and "vintage electric guitar sound, and strong trap beat". Lyrically, it "compares a person with a strange charm to licorice and wittily expresses the feeling of being drawn to it". The "breezy" mid-tempo pop track, "Bahama", features "sleepy, swooning summer chorus" and "details taking a friend on a trip to the titular island" over "handclaps and sunkissed, sparkling melodies". The seventh track, "Long Chat", is a dance song with lyrics "containing friendly conversations that continue throughout the night". The upbeat pop song, "Prologue", finds the group "address[ing] the difficulties and messiness of growing up, admitting to anxiety, disappointments, and loss of passion". The ninth track, "Live My Life", is a "cheerful guitar-based" pop-punk song containing a message of "living an independent life confidently" with lyrics about "breaking away from the existing framework as there is no right answer in life". The closing track, "Melody", is a piano "fan anthem" dedicated to the group's fans.

== Critical reception ==
Professional ratings
Review scores
Source	Rating
The Forty-Five	4/5 stars
The Guardian	2/5 stars
NME	4/5 stars
IZM	3.5/5 stars

Armageddon generally received positive reviews by the music critics, Rhian Daly of NME praised the album for falling "into the former camp and reinforces what we already knew – that when Aespa are allowed to run free in the sounds and sonics they've made their trademark, they're nothing short of exquisite". Writing for The Forty-Five, Jenessa Williams appreciated the group's "willingness to experiment with both hard and soft [sounds]", and noted that Aespa "really thrive when they stick to the edgier end of their USP". She furthermore stated that the group's "badass alchemy and attitude might just save the musical world". Rolling Stone India's publisher, Debashree Dutta praised Aespa's "vivid story" and the album's "poetic landscapes" which she described as "a varied and profound auditory experience" filled with "sentiments, moods, and instances woven into each song". Jeff Benjamin of Billboard described the album as "an artistic evolution in Aespa's" discography "by taking their narrative into an expansive multiverse to blur the boundaries between reality and virtual realms".

In a mixed review from The Guardian giving two out of five stars, from Alexis Petridis described it "all intriguing, and, it has to be said, very well done – Aespa's videos are charming and made to an extraordinarily high standard – yet it can't help but rouse the suspicion that their music might constitute something of an afterthought, a theory not dispelled by actually listening to it."

== Commercial performance ==
On May 27, 2024, it was reported that Armageddon has sold over 1.02 million copies in pre-orders sales. In China, the album reached number one on the QQ Music digital album sales chart, and was certified as "a double platinum album" within 3 hours of release.

== Accolades ==
Awards and nominations for Armageddon
Award ceremony	Year	Category	Result	Ref.
Asian Pop Music Awards	2024	Best Album of the Year (Overseas)	Won	
Asian Pop Music Awards	2024	Top 20 Albums of the Year (Overseas)	Won	
Golden Disc Awards	2025	Album of the Year (Daesang)	Nominated	
Golden Disc Awards	2025	Best Album (Bonsang)	Won	
Korean Music Awards	2025	Album of the Year (Daesang)	Nominated	
Korean Music Awards	2025	Best K-pop Album	Won	
MAMA Awards	2024	Album of the Year (Daesang)	Nominated	
Melon Music Awards	2024	Album of the Year (Daesang)	Won	
Melon Music Awards	2024	Millions Top 10 Album	Won	
Tencent Music Entertainment Awards	2024	K-pop Album of the Year	Won	
TMElive International Music Awards	2025	International Digital Album of the Year	Won	

== Track listing ==
Armageddon track listing
No.	Title	Lyrics	Music	Arrangement	Length
1.	"Supernova"	Kenzie	Kenzie; Paris Alexa; Dem Jointz	Dem Jointz	2:59
2.	"Armageddon"	Bang Hye-hyun (Jam Factory)	Ejae; Sumin; Waker (153/Joombas); No Identity	No Identity	3:17
3.	"Set the Tone"	Jo Yoon-kyung	Ludwig Lindell; Daniel Caesar; Ylva Dimberg	Caesar & Loui	3:23
4.	"Mine"	Lee Eun-hwa (153/Joombas)	Mike Daley; Mitchell Owens; Nicole "Kole" Cohen; Adrian McKinnon	Mike Daley; Mitchell Owens	3:14
5.	"Licorice"	Kang Eun-jeong	Daniel Davidsen; Peter Wallevik; Moa "Cazzi Opeia" Carlebecker; Karen Poole	PhD	2:39
6.	"Bahama"	Kenzie	Jonatan Gusmark; Ludvig Evers; Moa "Cazzi Opeia" Carlebecker; Ellen Berg; Kenzie	Moonshine; Kenzie	3:11
7.	"Long Chat (#♥)"	Moon Seol-ri	Stian Nyhammer Olsen; Live Rabo Lund-Roland; Nora Grefstad; Julia Finnseter	Stian Nyhammer Olsen	3:16
8.	"Prologue"	Mola; Mia (153/Joombas)	Gil Lewis; Micky Blue	Gil Lewis	3:15
9.	"Live My Life"	Leslie	Sophia Brenan; Nick Hahn; Edvard Erfjord	Edvard Erfjord	2:40
10.	"Melody" (목소리; Moksori)	Lee O-neul	MinGtion; Sophia Pae	MinGtion	3:08
Total length:					31:02

== Credits and personnel ==
Credits adapted from the album's liner notes.

Studio

- SM Wavelet Studio – recording (track 1–2, 6, 9), digital editing (track 6, 9–10), engineered for mix (track 10)
- SM Droplet Studio – recording (track 2, 7), digital editing (track 2), engineered for mix (track 2)
- SM Yellow Tail Studio – recording (track 3, 5), digital editing (track 1, 3)
- SM Aube Studio – recording (track 4, 8), digital editing (track 4–5, 8)
- SM Dorii Studio – recording (track 5, 10)
- Vibe Music Studio 606 – recording (track 10)
- The Vibe Studio – recording (track 10)
- SM Big Shot Studio – digital editing (track 7), mixing (track 5, 7)
- Doobdoob Studio – digital editing (track 7)
- SM Blue Ocean Studio – mixing (track 1–2)
- SM Blue Cup Studio – mixing (track 3–4)
- SM Starlight Studio – mixing (track 6, 9–10)
- SM Concert Hall Studio – mixing (track 8)
- 821 Sound – mastering (all tracks)

Personnel

- SM Entertainment – executive producer
- Lee Sung-soo – A&R executive
- Tak Young-jun – IP executive, executive supervisor
- Jang Cheol-hyuk – executive supervisor
- Aespa – vocals, background vocals (all tracks)
- Kenzie – producer, arrangement (track 6), lyrics, composition, vocal directing (track 1, 6)
- Paris Alexa – composition, background vocals (track 1)
- Dem Jointz – producer, composition, arrangement (track 1)
- Bang Hye-hyun (Jam Factory) – lyrics (track 2)
- Ejae – composition, background vocals (track 2)
- Sumin – composition, background vocals (track 2)
- Waker (153/Joombas) – composition, piano, programming (track 2)
- No Identity – producer, composition, arrangement, bass, drums, piano, synthesizer, programming (track 2)
- Jo Yoon-kyung – lyrics (track 3)
- Ludwig Lindell (Caesar & Loui) – producer, composition, arrangement (track 3)
- Daniel Caesar (Caesar & Loui) – producer, composition, arrangement (track 3)
- Ylva Dimberg – composition (track 3)
- Lee Eun-hwa (153/Joombas) – lyrics (track 4)
- Mike Daley – producer, composition, arrangement (track 4)
- Mitchell Owens – producer, composition, arrangement (track 4)
- Nicole "Kole" Cohen – composition (track 4)
- Adrian McKinnon – composition (track 4)
- Kang Eun-jeong – lyrics (track 5)
- Daniel Davidsen (PhD) – producer, composition, arrangement (track 5)
- Peter Wallevik (PhD) – producer, composition, arrangement (track 5)
- Moa "Cazzi Opeia" Carlebecker – composition (track 5–6), background vocals (track 6)
- Karen Poole – composition (track 5)
- Jonatan Gusmark (Moonshine) – producer, composition, arrangement (track 6)
- Ludvig Evers (Moonshine) – producer, composition, arrangement (track 6)
- Ellen Berg – composition, background vocals (track 6)
- Moon Seol-ri – lyrics (track 7)
- Stian Nyhammer Olsen – producer, composition, arrangement (track 7)
- Live Rabo Lund-Roland – composition (track 7)
- Nora Grefstad – composition (track 7)
- Julia Finnseter – composition (track 7)
- Mola – lyrics (track 8)
- Mia (153/Joombas) – lyrics (track 8)
- Gil Lewis – producer, composition, arrangement (track 8)
- Micky Blue – composition (track 8)
- Leslie – lyrics (track 9)
- Sophia Brenan – composition (track 9)
- Nick Hahn – composition (track 9)
- Edvard Erfjord – producer, composition, arrangement (track 9)
- Lee O-neul – lyrics (track 10)
- Sophia Pae – composition (track 10)
- MinGtion – producer, composition, arrangement, bass, piano (track 10), vocal directing (track 5, 10)
- Maxx Song – vocal directing (track 2)
- Saay – vocal directing (track 3)
- Kim Jin-hwan – vocal directing (track 4, 9)
- Emily Yeonseo Kim – vocal directing, background vocals (track 7)
- Perrie – vocal directing (track 8)
- Park Shin-won – guitar (track 10)
- Han Seong-eun – strings arrangement (track 10)
- Yung – strings (track 10)
- Kang Eun-ji – recording (track 1–2, 6, 9), digital editing (track 6, 9–10), engineered for mix (track 10)
- Kim Joo-hyun – recording (track 2, 7), digital editing (track 2), engineered for mix (track 2)
- Noh Min-ji – recording (track 1, 3, 5), digital editing (track 1, 3)
- Kim Hyo-joon – recording (track 4, 8), digital editing (track 4–5, 8)
- Jeong Jae-won – recording (track 5, 10)
- Lee Kang-hyun – recording (track 10)
- Oh Hyun-seok – recording (track 10)
- Kim Kyung-tae – recording (track 10)
- Lee Min-kyu – digital editing (track 7), mixing (track 5, 7)
- Eugene Kwon – digital editing (track 7)
- Kim Cheol-sun – mixing (track 1–2)
- Jung Eui-seok – mixing (track 3–4)
- Jeong Yoo-ra – mixing (track 6, 9–10)
- Nam Koong-jin – mixing (track 8)
- Kwon Nam-woo – mastering (all tracks)

== Charts ==
=== Weekly charts ===
Weekly chart performance for Armageddon
Chart (2024)	Peak position
Australian Hitseekers Albums (ARIA)	12
Austrian Albums (Ö3 Austria)	45
Belgian Albums (Ultratop Flanders)	94
Belgian Albums (Ultratop Wallonia)	196
Croatian International Albums (HDU)	14
French Albums (SNEP)	77
German Albums (Offizielle Top 100)	45
Japanese Albums (Oricon)	4
Japanese Combined Albums (Oricon)	3
Japanese Hot Albums (Billboard Japan)	14
Lithuanian Albums (AGATA)	98
Nigerian Albums (TurnTable)	34
Portuguese Albums (AFP)	5
South Korean Albums (Circle)	2
Swedish Physical Albums (Sverigetopplistan)	20
UK Album Downloads (Official Charts)	52
US Billboard 200	25
US Independent Albums (Billboard)	3
US World Albums (Billboard)	1

=== Monthly charts ===
Monthly chart performance for Armageddon
Chart (2024)	Position
Japanese Albums (Oricon)	8
South Korean Albums (Circle)	4

=== Year-end charts ===
Year-end chart performance for Armageddon
Chart (2024)	Position
Japanese Albums (Oricon)	96
Portuguese Albums (AFP)	141
South Korean Albums (Circle)	12

== Certifications ==
Certifications for Armageddon
Region	Certification	Certified units/sales
South Korea (KMCA)	Million	1,000,000^{^}
^{^} Shipments figures based on certification alone.

== Release history ==
Release history for Armageddon
Region	Date	Format	Label	Ref.
South Korea	May 27, 2024	CD	SM; Kakao	
Various	May 27, 2024	Digital download; streaming	SM; Kakao	
United States	July 5, 2024	CD	SM; Virgin	
Various	February 24, 2025	Vinyl LP	SM	
