= Thirsty (Aespa song) =

2023 song by Aespa

Song by Aespa

from the album My World
- Language: Korean; English
- Released: May 8, 2023
- Studio: Golden Bell Tree Sound
- Genre: R&B
- Length: 3:13
- Label: SM; Dreamus
- Composers: Geek Boy Al Swettenham; Kyler Niko; Paulina "Pau" Cerrilla
- Lyricist: Kim Bo-eun (JamFactory)

Music video
- "Thirsty" on YouTube

"Thirsty" is a song recorded by South Korean girl group Aespa for their third extended play My World. Composed and produced by Geek Boy AI Swettenham, Kyler Niko, and Paulina "Pau" Cerrilla with lyrics written by Kim Bo-eun from JamFactory, the R&B track was released by SM Entertainment on May 8, 2023 along with the EP.

== Background and release ==
On February 25–26, 2023, Aespa held their first solo concert tour Synk: Hyper Line at the Jamsil Indoor Stadium in Seoul. Among the songs performed by the group on the tour, the setlist included unreleased songs such as "Salty & Sweet" and "Thirsty." The group have previously teased these songs through their YouTube choreography practice videos and Instagram live broadcasts. By March 16, it was confirmed that the group would release a new album in May after 10 months, but was delayed due to a management dispute within SM Entertainment. On May 8, the group released their third extended play My World with "Thirsty" among the six songs on the EP.

== Composition ==
"Thirsty" was written by Kim Bo-eun from JamFactory, composed and arranged by Geek Boy AI Swettenham, with Kyler Niko and Paulina "Pau" Cerrilla contributing to the composition. The song is described as an R&B track that likens the deepening emotions toward another person to waves, expressing the "intensifying" sense of longing that grows with each glance.

Musically, "Thirsty" is described by Neil Z. Yeung of AllMusic as a smooth, alt-R&B cooldown track. Sharifa Charles from Clash notes that the song's sound evokes a familiar contemporary R&B style, with "flirtatious lyrics and harmonious melodies", blending 90s R&B nostalgia with modern pop influences through captivating synths. Abigail Firth from Dork describes the song as refreshing, combining a bubbly beat and flawless vocal harmonies, creating a sound that merges elements of PC Music with the new-R&B style of artists like Flo. According to Rhian Daly of NME, the track opens with a rippling melody reminiscent of Ariana Grande’s "Thank U, Next," but described that the group delved into a theme of flirtation, delivering a soft feel that encapsulates the excitement of a new crush.

== Promotion and reception ==
Prior to the release of "Thirsty," Aespa performed the song as part of their set list during their first concert tour, Synk: Hyper Line. On May 5, 2023, a track video for the song was released on the official YouTube account of the group. Actor Cha Joo-wan appeared as a cameo on the music video. They then performed the song along with "Spicy" at KBS's Music Bank on May 12 and SBS's Inkigayo on May 14. On May 21, the group performed the song with a live band on It's Live.

Following its release, "Thirsty" garnered positive reviews from music critics. The song was noted for its "dreamy" melody and "sweet" vocals. Jang Jin-ri of SPOTV featured the track in the Hidden Tracks series, describing it as "like paradise from the beginning." She highlighted the "poetic lyrics" and Winter’s "tingling voice," which she likened to waves. While she praised the album’s title track, "Spicy," for its summery feel, she noted that the song provided a darker, dreamy vibe that reflected SM's R&B ballad style. Mary Siroky of Consequence included the song in Fan Chant: 10 Best K-Pop B-Sides of 2023 (So Far) list, mentioning that it offered the group "a great chance to show off their harmonies."

== Commercial performance ==
"Thirsty" debuted at number 52 on South Korea's Circle Digital Chart in the chart issue dated May 7–13, 2023, and later peaked at number 30 in the chart issue dated May 28–June 3, 2023. In Vietnam, the song debuted and peaked at number 75 on the Vietnam Hot 100 chart.

On the Circle Monthly Digital Chart, "Thirsty" entered at number 55 for May and peaked at number 40 on the June 2023 issue. It ranked as the 146th song on Circle's Yearly Digital Chart for 2023.

== Credits and personnel ==
Credits adapted from liner notes of My World.

Studio

- Golden Bell Tree Sound – recording
- SM Lvyin Studio – recording, digital editing, engineered for mix
- SM Blue Ocean Studio – mixing
- 821 Sound – mastering

Personnel

- Aespa – vocals, background vocals
- Kim Bo-eun (JamFactory) – lyrics
- Geek Boy Al Swettenham – composition, arrangement
- Kyler Niko – composition
- Paulina "Pau" Cerrilla – composition
- Emily Yeonseo Kim – vocal directing, background vocals
- Kim Kwang-min – recording
- Lee Ji-hong – recording, digital editing, engineered for mix
- Kim Cheol-sun – mixing
- Kwon Nam-woo – mastering

== Charts ==
=== Weekly charts ===
Weekly chart performance for "Thirsty"
| Chart (2023) | Peak position |
|---|---|
| South Korea (Circle) | 30 |
| Vietnam (Vietnam Hot 100) | 75 |

=== Monthly charts ===
Monthly chart performance for "Thirsty"
| Chart (2023) | Position |
|---|---|
| South Korea (Circle) | 40 |

=== Year-end charts ===
Year-end chart performance for "Thirsty"
| Chart (2023) | Position |
|---|---|
| South Korea (Circle) | 146 |
