= Drama (Aespa song) =

- Sped up cover

Single by Aespa

from the EP Drama
- Language: Korean
- Released: November 10, 2023
- Genre: Hip hop; dance
- Length: 3:35
- Label: SM; Kakao; Warner
- Composers: No Identity; Waker (153/Joombas); Ejae; Charlotte Wilson
- Lyricists: Bang Hye-hyun (JamFactory); Ellie Suh (153/Joombas)
- Producer: No Identity

Aespa singles chronology
| "Zoom Zoom" (2023) | "Drama" (2023) | "Regret of the Times" (2024) |

Music video
- "Drama" on YouTube

"Drama" is a song recorded by South Korean girl group Aespa for their fourth extended play of the same name. It was released as the EP's lead single by SM Entertainment on November 10, 2023.

== Background and release ==
On October 10, SM Entertainment announced that the group would be releasing their fourth extended play titled Drama on November 10. An introduction teaser video was also released on the same day. On November 3, the highlight medley teaser video was released, followed by the music video teaser on November 9. The song was released alongside its music video and the extended play on November 10.

== Composition ==
"Drama" was written by Bang Hye-hyun of JamFactory, and Ellie Suh of 153/Joombas, while the composition, arrangement and music production were handled by No Identity, with Waker of 153/Joombas, Ejae, and Charlotte Wilson participating in the composition. Described as a hip-hop and dance track, the song is characterized by "an aggressive drum sound and sophisticated synth bass", and its lyrics convey a theme of having "confident attitude that every story begins with Aespa". Early drafts of "Drama", however, contained references to tree planting in its lyrics, done as part of a push by SM founder Lee Soo-man to include the topic in the company's music.

== Commercial performance ==
"Drama" debuted at number 90 on South Korea's Circle Digital Chart in the chart issue dated November 5–11, 2023, ascending to number four in the following week. In Japan, the song debuted at number 34 on the Billboard Japan Hot 100 in the chart issue dated November 22, 2023. On the Oricon Combined Singles Chart, the song debuted at number 36 in the chart issue dated November 27, 2023.

In Singapore, the song debuted at number seven on the RIAS Top Streaming Chart, and number four on the RIAS Top Regional Chart in the chart issue dated November 10–16, 2023. It also debuted at number eight on the Billboard Singapore Songs in the chart issue dated November 25, 2023. In Hong Kong, the song debuted at number four on the Billboard Hong Kong Songs in the chart issue dated November 25, 2023. In Indonesia, the song debuted at number 15 on the Billboard Indonesia Songs in the chart issue dated November 25, 2023. In Malaysia, the song debuted at number seven on the Billboard Malaysia Songs in the chart issue dated November 25, 2023. It also debuted at number four on the RIM Top 20 Most Streamed International Singles Chart in the chart issue dated November 10–16, 2023. In Taiwan, the song debuted at number three on the Billboard Taiwan Songs in the chart issue dated November 25, 2023.

In the United States, the song debuted at number eight on the Billboard World Digital Song Sales in the chart issue dated November 25, 2023. In Australia, the song debuted at number ten on the ARIA Top 20 Hitseekers Singles Chart in the chart issue dated September 5, 2022. In New Zealand, the song debuted at number 15 on the RMNZ Hot Singles in the chart issue dated November 20, 2023. Globally, the song debuted at number 38 on the Billboard Global 200 in the chart issue dated November 25, 2023. It also debuted at number 21 on the Billboard Global Excl. U.S. in the chart issue dated November 25, 2023.

== Music video ==
The music video was released alongside the song by SM Entertainment on November 10, 2023. The music video described as "movie-like" with "thrilling action sequences" depicts the group's journey of "returning back to Kwangya", featuring "Winter and Giselle playing the main characters [that] unfolds under a solid story[line]" with scenes transitioning from scenes of "Winter riding a motorcycle" and "Karina performing martial arts with a kendo".

== Promotion ==
Prior to the release of Drama, on November 10, 2023, Aespa held a live event called "Aespa Drama Countdown Live" on YouTube, TikTok, Weverse, and Idol Plus, aimed at introducing the album and its tracks, including "Drama", and connecting with their fanbase. The group subsequently performed on three music programs in the first week of promotion: KBS's Music Bank on November 10, MBC's Show! Music Core on November 11, and SBS's Inkigayo on November 12. On the second and final week of promotion, they performed on five music programs: MBC M's "Show Champion" on November 15, Mnet's M Countdown on November 16, Music Bank on November 17, Show! Music Core on November 18, and Inkigayo on November 19.

== Accolades ==
On South Korea music programs, "Drama" achieved a triple crown on January 14 episode of Inkigayo in 2024.

Music program awards for "Drama"
| Program | Date | Ref. |
|---|---|---|
| Inkigayo | November 26, 2023 | |
| Inkigayo | January 7, 2024 | |
| Inkigayo | January 14, 2024 | |

== Track listing ==
Digital download / streaming – sped up version

1. "Drama" (sped up version) – 3:04
2. "Drama" – 3:34

== Credits ==
Credits adapted from album's liner notes.

Studio

- SM Yellow Tail Studio – recording, digital editing, engineered for mix
- SM Big Shot Studio – recording
- SM SSAM Studio – recording
- SM Blue Ocean Studio – mixing
- 821 Sound – mastering

Personnel

- SM Entertainment – executive producer
- Aespa – vocals, background vocals
- Bang Hye-hyun (JamFactory) – lyrics
- Ellie Suh (153/Joombas) – lyrics
- No Identity – producer, composition, arrangement, bass, keyboards, synthesizer, drum programming
- Waker (153/Joombas) – composition, keyboards
- Ejae – composition, background vocals
- Charlotte Wilson – composition
- Deez – vocal directing
- Noh Min-ji – recording, digital editing, engineered for mix
- Lee Min-kyu – recording
- Kang Eun-ji – recording
- Kang Sun-young – digital editing
- Kim Cheol-sun – mixing
- Kwon Nam-woo – mastering

== Charts ==
=== Weekly charts ===
Weekly chart performance for "Drama"
| Chart (2023) | Peak position |
|---|---|
| Australia Hitseekers (ARIA) | 10 |
| Global 200 (Billboard) | 38 |
| Hong Kong (Billboard) | 4 |
| Indonesia (ASIRI) | 19 |
| Indonesia (Billboard) | 15 |
| Japan (Japan Hot 100) | 34 |
| Japan Combined Singles (Oricon) | 36 |
| Malaysia (Billboard) | 7 |
| Malaysia International (RIM) | 4 |
| Netherlands (Global Top 40) | 33 |
| New Zealand Hot Singles (RMNZ) | 15 |
| Singapore (RIAS) | 7 |
| South Korea (Circle) | 2 |
| Taiwan (Billboard) | 3 |
| UK Video Streaming (OCC) | 51 |
| US World Digital Song Sales (Billboard) | 8 |
| Vietnam (Vietnam Hot 100) | 13 |

=== Monthly charts ===
Monthly chart performance for "Drama"
| Chart (2023) | Position |
|---|---|
| South Korea (Circle) | 14 |

=== Year-end charts ===
Year-end chart performance for "Drama"
| Chart (2023) | Position |
|---|---|
| South Korea (Circle) | 198 |
| Chart (2024) | Position |
| Global Excl. US (Billboard) | 158 |
| South Korea (Circle) | 20 |
| Chart (2025) | Position |
| South Korea (Circle) | 120 |

== Certifications ==
Certifications for "Drama"
| Region | Certification | Certified units/sales |
Streaming
| Japan (RIAJ) | Platinum | 100,000,000^{†} |
| South Korea (KMCA) | Platinum | 100,000,000^{†} |
^{†} Streaming-only figures based on certification alone.

== Release history ==
Release history for "Drama"
| Region | Date | Format | Version | Label |
|---|---|---|---|---|
| Various | November 10, 2023 | Digital download; streaming | Original | SM; Kakao; Warner |
| Various | December 15, 2023 | Digital download; streaming | Sped up | SM; Kakao; Warner |
