= Armageddon (Aespa song) =

Single by Aespa

from the album Armageddon
- Language: Korean; English
- Released: May 27, 2024
- Genre: Hip hop; dance
- Length: 3:16
- Label: SM; Kakao
- Composers: Ejae; Sumin; Waker (153/Joombas); No Identity
- Lyricist: Bang Hye-hyun

Aespa singles chronology
"Supernova" (2024)	"Armageddon" (2024)	"Hot Mess" (2024)

Music video
- "Armageddon" on YouTube

"Armageddon" is a song recorded by South Korean girl group Aespa for their first studio album of the same name. It was released by SM Entertainment on May 27, 2024, as the second single from the album.

== Background and release ==
On April 22, 2024, SM Entertainment announced that Aespa would be releasing their first studio album titled Armageddon. It was also announced that the album would feature two title tracks: "Supernova" and "Armageddon", with the former releasing on May 13 and the latter, along with the album, on May 27. On May 10, the track listing was revealed alongside a highlight medley teaser video. On May 26, the music video teaser was released. "Armageddon" was released along with the album and its music video on May 27.

On September 20, ScreaM Records released the remix versions of "Armageddon" by Flava D, 2Spade, and Mount XLR, alongside "Supernova" remix, under the 33rd volume of the series iScreaM.

== Composition ==
"Armageddon" was written by Bang Hye-hyun, composed and arranged by No Identity with Ejae, Sumin, and Waker of 153/Joombas participating in the composition. Described as a "old-school and trendy" hip hop dance song featuring "strong synth bass rhythm", with lyrics containing message that "Only I can define myself". "Armageddon" was composed in the key of A major, with a tempo of 92 beats per minute.

== Promotion ==
Prior to the release of Armageddon, on May 27, 2024, Aespa held a live event titled "Aespa 'Armageddon' Countdown Live" on YouTube, TikTok, and Weverse, aimed at introducing the album and its tracks, including "Armageddon", and connecting with their fanbase. They subsequently performed on one music programs: Mnet's M Countdown on May 30.

== Accolades ==
Awards and nominations for "Armageddon"
Award ceremony	Year	Category	Result	Ref.
Asian Pop Music Awards	2024	Best Dance Performance (Overseas)	Nominated	
Asian Pop Music Awards	2024	Record of the Year (Overseas)	Nominated	
MAMA Awards	2024	Best Music Video	Won	
MAMA Awards	2024	Song of the Year	Nominated	
MTV Video Music Awards Japan	2025	Best K-pop Video	Won	
MTV Video Music Awards Japan	2025	Video of the Year	Nominated	

Music program awards
Program	Date	Ref.
M Countdown	June 6, 2024	
M Countdown	June 13, 2024	
M Countdown	June 20, 2024	
Show Champion	June 5, 2024	

== Track listing ==
Digital download and streaming – iScreaM Vol.33: Supernova / Armageddon Remixes

1. "Supernova" (Grimes remix) – 3:47
2. "Armageddon" (Flava D remix) – 4:07
3. "Armageddon" (2Spade remix) – 3:08
4. "Armageddon" (Mount XLR remix) – 3:16
5. "Supernova" – 2:58
6. "Armageddon" – 3:16

== Credits ==
Credits adapted from the album's liner notes.

Studio

- SM Wavelet Studio – recording
- SM Droplet Studio – recording, digital editing, engineered for mix
- SM Blue Ocean Studio – mixing
- 821 Sound – mastering

Personnel

- SM Entertainment – executive producer
- Aespa – vocals, background vocals
- Bang Hye-hyun – lyrics
- Ejae – composition, background vocals
- Sumin – composition, background vocals
- Waker (153/Joombas) – composition, piano, programming
- No Identity – composition, arrangement, bass, drums, piano, synthesizer, programming
- Maxx Song – vocal directing
- Kang Eun-ji – recording
- Kim Joo-hyun – recording, digital editing, engineered for mix
- Kim Cheol-sun – mixing
- Kwon Nam-woo – mastering

== Charts ==
=== Weekly charts ===
Weekly chart performance for "Armageddon"
Chart (2024)	Peak position
Global 200 (Billboard)	28
Hong Kong (Billboard)	9
Indonesia (ASIRI)	11
Indonesia (Billboard)	8
Japan (Japan Hot 100)	63
Japan Streaming (Oricon)	41
Malaysia (Billboard)	6
Malaysia International (RIM)	5
Netherlands (Global Top 40)	29
New Zealand Hot Singles (RMNZ)	24
Philippines (Philippines Hot 100)	85
Singapore (RIAS)	8
South Korea (Circle)	4
Taiwan (Billboard)	6
UK Singles Downloads (Official Charts)	20
UK Singles Sales (OCC)	21

=== Monthly charts ===
Monthly chart performance for "Armageddon"
Chart (2024)	Position
South Korea (Circle)	4

=== Year-end charts ===
Year-end chart performance for "Armageddon"
Chart (2024)	Position
Global Excl. US (Billboard)	169
South Korea (Circle)	29
Taiwan (Hito Radio)	25

Year-end chart performance for "Armageddon"
Chart (2025)	Position
South Korea (Circle)	70

== Certifications ==
Certifications for "Armageddon"
Region	Certification	Certified units/sales
Brazil (Pro-Música Brasil)	Platinum	40,000^{‡}
Streaming
Japan (RIAJ)	Gold	50,000,000^{†}
^{‡} Sales+streaming figures based on certification alone.^{†} Streaming-only figures based on certification alone.

== Release history ==
Release history for "Armageddon"
Region	Date	Format	Version	Label
Various	May 27, 2024	Digital download; streaming	Original	SM; Kakao
Various	September 20, 2024	Digital download; streaming	Remixes	ScreaM; SM; Kakao
