= List of songs recorded by Aespa =

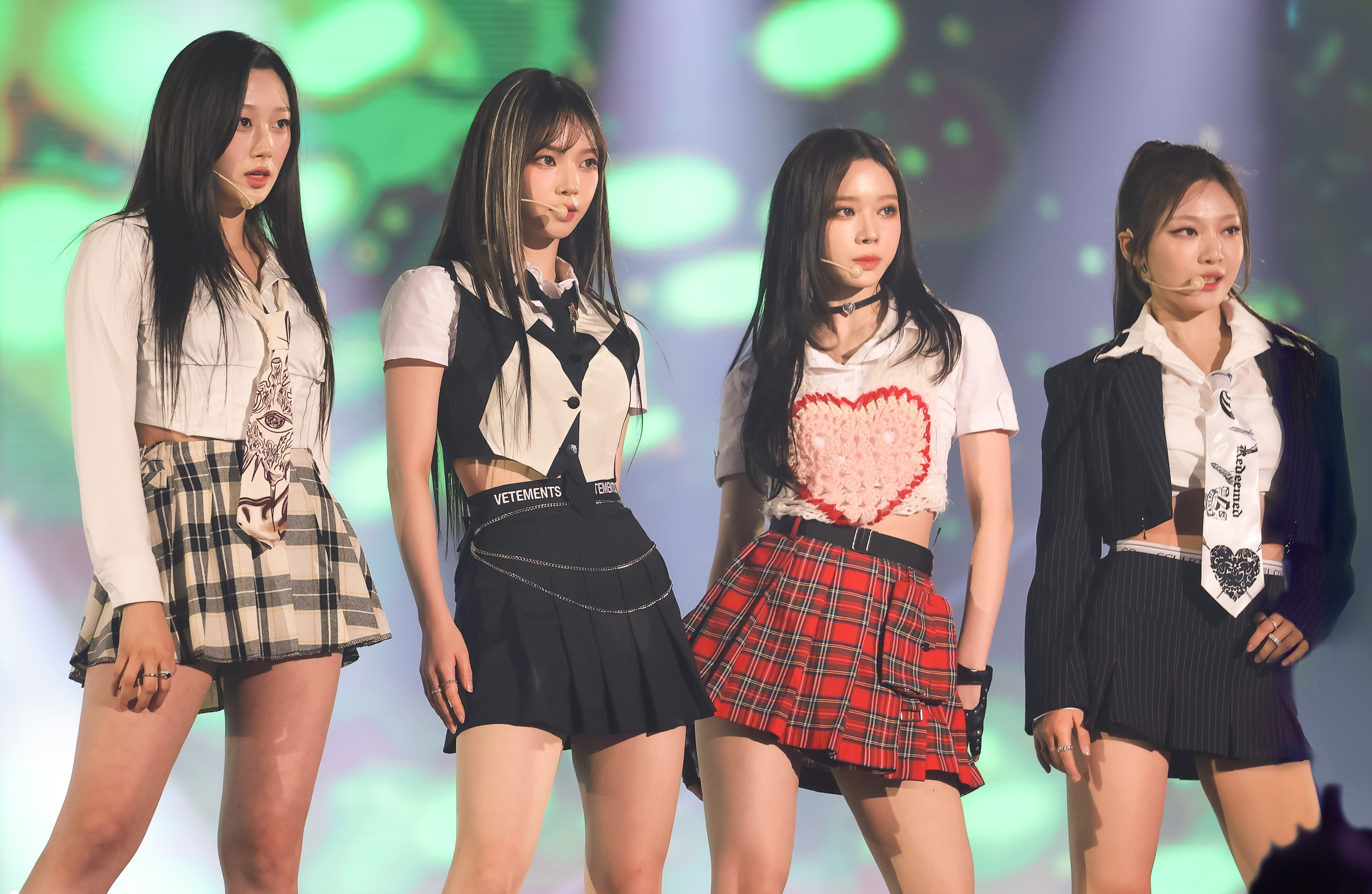
Aespa in 2023 From left to right: Giselle, Karina, Winter, & Ningning

South Korean girl group Aespa has recorded 82 songs, of which 61 are in Korean, 12 are in English, and 9 in Japanese.

Key
†	Indicates a single release
#	Indicates a promotional single release
‡	Indicates a soundtrack single release

== Songs originally recorded in Korean ==
List of Korean songs, showing year released, lyricist, composer, arranger, and originating albumsSongs recorded by Aespa
Title	Year	Lyricist	Composer	Arranger	Album	Ref.
"Aenergy"	2021	Yoo Young-jin	Kill Dave; Pat Morrissey; Jess Corazza; Yoo Young-jin	Kill Dave; Pat Morrissey; Yoo Young-jin	Savage	
"Armageddon" †	2024	Bang Hye-hyun (Jam Factory)	Ejae; Sumin; Waker (153/Joombas); No Identity	No Identity	Armageddon	
"Bahama"	2024	Kenzie	Jonatan Gusmark; Ludvig Evers; Moa “Cazzi Opeia” Carlebecker; Ellen Berg; Kenzie	Moonshine; Kenzie	Armageddon	
"Beautiful Christmas" (with Red Velvet) †	2022	Kim Jae-won	Justin Reinstein; Alysa (@Number K); JJean (@Number K)	Alysa (@Number K)	2022 Winter SM Town: SMCU Palace	
"Bite"	2026	Joowon; Zaya (153/Joombas)	Stian Nyhammer Olsen; Julia Bognar Finnseter; Dana; Awrii (The Hub)	Stian Nyhammer Olsen	Lemonade	
"Black Mamba" †	2020	Yoo Young-jin	Omega; Ella Isaacson; Gabriela Geneva; Jordan Reyes; Shaun Lopez; Scott Chesak; Yoo Young-jin	Omega; Jordan Reyes; Shaun Lopez; Scott Chesak; Yoo Young-jin	Non-album single	
"Bubble"	2025	Kang Eun-jung	Gingerbread; Rachel West; Olivia Ruby	Gingerbread	Rich Man	
"Camouflage"	2026	Joowon	Theo Drose; Gustav Parling; Matilda Winberg; Charlotte Boyle	Act Social	Lemonade	
"Can't Control Myself"	2026	Yoon (153/Joombas)	Markus Videsäter; Grace Baer; David Straaf	Markus Videsäter; Grace Baer; David Straaf	Lemonade	
"Count On Me"	2025	Mola	Bryan Fryzel; Kella Armitage; Stephanie; Jane Lang	Frequency	Rich Man	
"Dirty Work" †	2025	Jeong Mul-hwa (Jamfactory)	Evan Blair; Taylor Upsahl; Elijah Noll; Imlay	Evan Blair; Imlay	Dirty Work	
"Drama" †	2023	Bang Hye-hyun (JamFactory); Ellie Suh (153/Joombas)	No Identity; Waker (153/Joombas); Ejae; Charlotte Wilson	No Identity	Drama	
"Dreams Come True" †	2021	Bada; Yoo Young-jin; BoA	Risto Armas Asikainen; Yoo Young-jin; BoA	Yoo Young-jin; BoA; Shaun Kim; BXN	2021 Winter SM Town: SMCU Express	
"Drift"	2025	E-Green (La La La Studio)	Stian Nyhammer Olsen; Herbert Crichlow; Paulos Solbø; Stephny Ko; Julia Finnseter	Stian Nyhammer Olsen	Rich Man	
"Don't Blink"	2023	Hwang Yu-bin (VeryGoods)	Dillon Deskin; Tima Dee; Deanna Villarreal	Dillon Deskin	Drama	
"Flights, Not Feelings"	2024	Lee Hye-yum (Jam Factory)	Honey Noise (The Hub); Brown Panda (The Hub); Frankie Day (The Hub); Chanti (The Hub)	Honey Noise (The Hub); Brown Panda (The Hub)	Whiplash	
"Flowers"	2024	Ji Ye-won (153/Joombas)	Sofia Kay; Chantry Johnson; Noémie Legrand	Chantry Johnson	Whiplash	
"Forever" (약속) †	2021	Yoo Young-jin	Yoo Young-jin	Yoo Young-jin	Non-album single	
"Girls" †	2022	Yoo Young-jin	Ryan S. Jhun; Hanif Sabzevari (Hitmanic); Dennis "DeKo" Kordnejad (Hitmanic); Rodnae "Chikk" Bell; Pontus PJ Ljung; Yoo Young-jin	Ryan S. Jhun; Hitmanic; Pontus "PJ" Ljung; Yoo Young-jin	Girls	
"Hot Air Balloon"	2023	Jo Yoon-kyung	Moa "Cazzi Opeia" Carlebecker; Ellen Berg; Alysa; Nermin Harambasic; Stian Nyhammer Olsen	Stian Nyhammer Olsen; Alysa	Drama	
"Iconic"	2021	Jo Yoon-kyung	Sophie Curtis; Val Del Prete (153/Joombas); Timothy Tan	Timothy Tan	Savage	
"ICU" (쉬어가도 돼)	2022	Bae Hye-jin (153/Joombas)	Ryan S. Jhun; Josh Cumbee; Nisha Asnani	Ryan S. Jhun; Josh Cumbee	Girls	
"I'll Make You Cry"	2021	Kenzie	Kenzie; Kirsten Collins; Timothy "BOS" Bullock; Brandon Green; Hautboi Rich	Imlay	Savage	
"Illusion" (도깨비불) #	2022	Lee Thor (Lalala Studio)	G'harah "PK" Degeddingseze; Patricia Battani	G'harah "PK" Degeddingseze; Patricia Battani; Steve Octave	Girls	
"I'm Unhappy"	2023	Lee Seu-ran (JamFactory)	Barry Cohen; Sophie Hintze; Ally Ahern	Gingerbread	My World	
"Just Another Girl"	2024	Lee Seu-ran	Fabian Torsson; Moa "Cazzi Opeia" Carlebecker; Ellen Berg; Nermin Harambasic	Phat Fabe	Whiplash	
"Kill It"	2024	Hyun Ji-won	Imlay; Ejae; Kirsten Collins	Imlay	Whiplash	
"Lemonade" †	2026	Ellie Suh (153/Joombas)	Lewis Jankel; Jordan Shaw; Taylor Upsahl; Cyrus Villanueva	Shift K3Y	Lemonade	
"Licorice"	2024	Kang Eun-jeong	Daniel Davidsen; Peter Wallevik; Moa “Cazzi Opeia” Carlebecker; Karen Poole	PhD	Armageddon	
"Life's Too Short"	2022	Jang Jeong-won	Becky Hill; Sam Klempner; Uzoechi Emenike	Sam Klempner	Girls	
"Lingo"	2022	Song Jae-ri (153/Joombas)	Alma Goodman; Gabriella Grombacher; Christina Galligan; Lisa "Lixa" Hickox	Lixa	Girls	
"Live My Life"	2024	Leslie	Sophia Brenan; Nick Hahn; Edvard Erfjord	Edvard Erfjord	Armageddon	
"Long Chat (#♥︎)"	2024	Moon Seol-li	Stian Nyhammer Olsen; Live Rabo Lund-Roland; Nora Grefstad; Julia Finnseter	Stian Nyhammer Olsen	Armageddon	
"Lucid Dream" (자각몽)	2021	Ellie Suh (153/Joombas)	Kill Dave; Pat Morrissey; Hayley Kiyoko; Paul Phamous; Marcus Lomax	Kill Dave; Pat Morrissey; Imlay	Savage	
"Melody" (목소리)	2024	Lee O-neul	MinGtion; Sophia Pae	MinGtion	Armageddon	
"Mine"	2024	Lee Eun-hwa (153/Joombas)	Mike Daley; Mitchell Owens; Nicole “KOLE” Cohen; Adrian McKinnon	Mike Daley; Mitchell Owens	Armageddon	
"My Plan"	2026	Jvde (Galactika)	Simon Petrén; Ikki	Simon Petrén	Lemonade	
"Next Level" †	2021	Yoo Young-jin	Mario Marchetti; Adam McInnis; Sophie Curtis; Yoo Young-jin	Mario Marchetti; Adam McInnis; Yoo Young-jin	Non-album single	
"Over you" (with Chris Martin & Jacob Collier)	2024	Jacob Collier; Cho Yoonkyoung; Francesca Haincourt	Jacob Collier; Cho Yoonkyoung; Francesca Haincourt	Jacob Collier	Djesse Vol. 4	
"Pink Hoodie"	2024	Lee Eun-hwa (153/Joombas)	Didrik Thott; Sebastian Thott; Maria Marcus	Sebastian Thott	Whiplash	
"Prologue"	2024	Mola; Mi-ah (153/Joombas)	Gil Lewis; Micky Blue	Gil Lewis	Armageddon	
"Regret of the Times" (시대유감 (時代遺憾) †	2024	Bewhy; Karina; Chanho “Greentea” Kim; Kriz; No2zcat; Seo Taiji	Seo Taiji	Chanho “Greentea” Kim; No2zcat	Non-album single	
"Rich Man" †	2025	Le'mon	Cody Tarpley; Rachel Kanner; Ben Samama; Ryan Jhun	Cody Tarpley; Ryan Jhun	Rich Man	
"Salty & Sweet"	2023	Bang Hye-hyun (JamFactory)	Anne Judith Wik; Moa "Cazzi Opeia" Carlebecker; Jinbyjin	Jinbyjin	My World	
"Savage" †	2021	Yoo Young-jin	Kirsten Collins; Jia Lih; Yoo Young-jin; Hautboi Rich	Jia Lih; Yoo Young-jin	Savage	
"Set the Tone"	2024	Jo Yoon-kyung	Ludwig Lindell; Daniel Caesar; Ylva Dimberg	Caesar & Loui	Armageddon	
"Shakin'"	2026	Hyun Ji-won	Jonatan Gunsmark; Ludvig Evers; Eva Parmakova; Bobii Lewis	Moonshine	Lemonade	
"Spicy" †	2023	Bang Hye-hyun (JamFactory)	Ludvig Evers (Moonshine); Jonatan Gusmark (Moonshine); Emily Yeonseo Kim; Moa "Cazzi Opeia" Carlebecker	Ludvig Evers (Moonshine); Jonatan Gusmark (Moonshine); Jinbyjin	My World	
"Supernova" †	2024	Kenzie	Kenzie; Paris Alexa; Dem Jointz	Dem Jointz	Armageddon	
"Switchblade" (featuring Ty Dolla Sign)	2026	Danke; Joowon; Tyrone Griffin, Jr. Ant Clemons	Evan Blair; Megan Bülow; David Charles Fischer; Sasha Alex Sloan; Griffin; Ant Clemons	Evan Blair	Lemonade	
"Thirsty"	2023	Kim Bo-eun (JamFactory)	Geek Boy Al Swettenham; Kyler Niko; Paulina "Pau" Cerrilla	Geek Boy Al Swettenham	My World	
"'Til We Die"	2026	Yoon (153/Joombas); Kelbyul (153/Joombas)	Alex Sacco; Alma Goodman; Parker James	Alex Sacco	Lemonade	
"Til We Meet Again"	2023	Choi Jae-yeon (JamFactory)	Jake K (Artiffect); Maria Marcus; Andreas Öberg; MCK (Artiffect)	Jake K (Artiffect); MCK (Artiffect)	My World	
"To the Girls"	2025	Lee Seu-ran	Andreas Ohrn; Peter Bostrom; Andrea Danielsson	Peter Bostrom	Rich Man	
"Trick or Trick"	2023	Kim Min-ji (JamFactory)	Kristin Langsrud; August Dagestad; Johanne Lid; Stian Nyhammer Olsen	Stian Nyhammer Olsen	Drama	
"WDA (Whole Different Animal)" (featuring G-Dragon) †	2026	Jvde (Galactika); G-Dragon	Dwayne Abernathy Jr. Ryan S. Jhun; Varick "Smitty" Smith; G-Dragon	Dem Jointz; Ryan S. Jhun	Lemonade	
"Welcome to My World" (with Naevis) †	2023	Ellie Suh (153/Joombas); Hyun Ji-won; Danke (Lalala Studio)	Mich Hansen; Jacob Uchorczak; Celine Svanbäck; Patrizia Helander	Mich Hansen; Ubizz	My World	
"Whiplash" †	2024	Leslie (XYXX)	Marcus "MarcLo" Lomax; Neil Ormandy; Rosina "Soaky Siren" Russell; Lewis Jankel	Lewis Jankel; Neil Ormandy	Whiplash	
"Yeppi Yeppi"	2021	Deez; Saay	Coach & Sendo; Deez; Saay	Coach & Sendo; Soultriii	Savage	
"YOLO"	2023	Na Yun-jeong (Lalala Studio)	Albi Albertsson (Clarity-X); Anna Timgren	Albi Albertsson (Clarity-X)	Drama	
"You"	2023	Lee O-neul	Jake K (Artiffect); Maria Marcus; MCK (Artiffect); St_Knox (Artiffect); Louise Frick Sveen	Jake K (Artiffect); MCK (Artiffect); St_Knox (Artiffect)	Drama	

== Songs originally recorded in Japanese ==
List of Japanese songs, showing year released, lyricist, composer, arranger, and originating albumsSongs recorded by Aespa
Title	Year	Lyricist	Composer	Arranger	Album	Ref.
"Attitude" ‡	2026	Lauren Kaori	Wilhelmina; Lukas Hällgren; Edwin Lindberg	Wilhelmina; Lukas Hällgren; Edwin Lindberg	Kill Blue OST	
"Done with Rules"	2026	Masami Kakinuma	Aftrshok; Brown Panda; C'SA; Honey Noise; Strong Dragon	Aftrshok; Brown Panda; Honey Noise; Strong Dragon	Kiss n Tell	
"Fangirl"	2026	Lauren Aquilina; RISC; Sarah Troy	Lauren Aquilina; RISC; Sarah Troy	Lauren Aquilina; RISC; Sarah Troy	Kiss n Tell	
"Hot Mess" †	2024	H.Toyosaki	Kenzie; Moonshine; Moa "Cazzi Opeia" Carlebecker; Ellen Berg	Kenzie; Moonshine	Hot Mess	
"In Halo"	2026	Ryo Ito; Sorato; Tsingtao	Ryo Ito; Sorato; Tsingtao	Sorato	Kiss n Tell	
"Kiss n Tell" †	2026	Mahiro	Alna Hofmeyr; David Wilson; Rollo	Hanael; Dwilly	Kiss n Tell	
"Orbit Pop"	2026	Yamai	Arineh Karimi; Haring; Luke; BB Elliot	Haring; Luke	Kiss n Tell	
"Sun and Moon"	2024	Kanata Okajima; Jamil Kazmi; Soma Genda; Ereca	Soma Genda; Ereca; Dirty Orange	Ereca; Dirty Orange	Hot Mess	
"Zoom Zoom" ‡	2023	Yui Mugino; Jamesy Minimal; Soma Genda	Soma Genda; Dirty Orange; Yui Mugino	Soma Genda; Dirty Orange; Yui Mugino	Beyblade X OST	

== Songs originally recorded in English ==
List of English songs, showing year released, lyricist, composer, arranger, and originating albumsSongs recorded by Aespa
Title	Year	Lyricist	Composer	Arranger	Album	Ref.
"Angel #48"	2025	Wilhelmina	Kenzie; Greg Bonnick; Hayden Chapman; Wilhelmina	LDN Noise	Rich Man	
"Better Things" †	2023	Leroy Clampitt; Rachel Keen	Leroy Clampitt; Rachel Keen	Leroy Clampitt; Rachel Keen	Non-album single	
"Dark Arts" #	2025	Haris; Sandra Wickström	Rasmus Palmgren; Haris; Sandra Wikström	Rasmus Palmgren	Non-album single	
"Die Trying" ‡	2024	Marlowe; Tokimonsta	Marlowe; Tokimonsta	Tokimonsta	Rebel Moon: Songs of the Rebellion OST	
"Dollhouse World" ‡	2025	Elizabeth Pitchkhadze; Jordan Sweet	Elizabeth Pitchkhadze; Jordan Sweet	Elizabeth Pitchkhadze; Jordan Sweet	Gabby's Dollhouse: The Movie OST	
"Get Goin’" ‡	2024	Dennis Lee; Philip Balsam	Dennis Lee; Philip Balsam	Andrew Hey; Sam Ramirez; Harvey Mason Jr.	Fraggle Rock: Back to the Rock - Season 2 OST	
"Hold on Tight" ‡	2023	Aaron Hibell; Boy Matthews; Dave LaBrel; Georgia Ku; Ivan Larionov	Aaron Hibell; Boy Matthews; Dave LaBrel; Georgia Ku; Ivan Larionov	Aaron Hibell	Tetris OST	
"Jingle Bell Rock" #	2023	Jim Boothe; Joe Beal	Jim Boothe; Joe Beal	Ryland Blackinton	Non-album single	
"Keychain" (with Anderson .Paak) ‡	2026	Dem Jointz; Brandon Anderson; Cristi “Stalone” Abernathy	Dem Jointz; Brandon Anderson; Cristi “Stalone” Abernathy	Dem Jointz; Brandon Anderson; Cristi “Stalone” Abernathy	K-Pops! OST	
"Life's Too Short" (English version) †	2022	Becky Hill; Sam Klempner; Uzoechi Emenike	Becky Hill; Sam Klempner; Uzoechi Emenike	Sam Klempner	Girls	
"Roll"	2026	Alma Goodman; Alida Garpestad Peck; Yorkie	Cook Classics; Alma Goodman; Alida Garpestad Peck	Cook Classics	Lemonade	
"We Go" ‡	2023	Jade.J	Lee Won-jong; Keyor; C'SA; Night View	Lee Won-jong; Keyor; Night View	Pokémon Horizons: The Series OST	
