= Aespa discography =

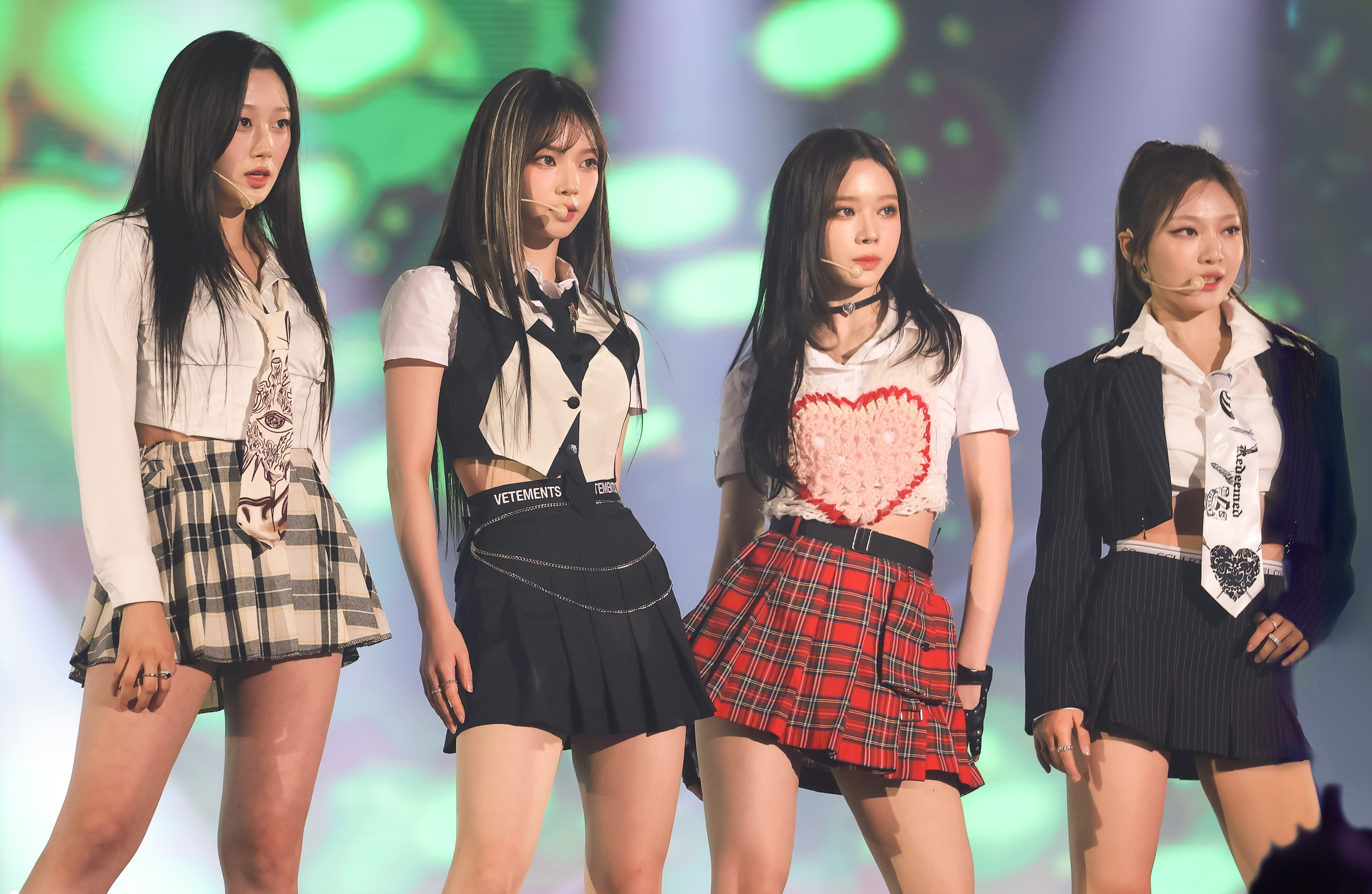
- Aespa in 2023
- Studio albums: 2
- EPs: 7
- Singles: 22
- Single albums: 5
- Promotional singles: 3
- Soundtrack appearances: 9

South Korean girl group Aespa have released two studio albums, seven extended plays (EPs), five single albums, twenty-two singles, three promotional singles and nine soundtracks.

The group debuted on November 17, 2020, with the single "Black Mamba". Their first comeback single "Next Level" was released in May 2021 to widespread commercial success, peaking at number two on the Circle Digital Chart, and K-pop Hot 100. In October 2021, they released their first EP Savage alongside its lead single of the same name. The EP sold 787,600 copies and was the best-selling debut physical release by an SM Entertainment act at the time. The lead single "Savage" also became Aespa's second top-five hit in South Korea and their first top 40 entry on the Billboard Global 200.

In July 2022, they released their second EP Girls, which sold 1,844,376 copies and debuted at number three on the Billboard 200 chart. They returned in May 2023 with their third EP My World, which earned 1.8 million pre-orders and sold 1,372,929 million copies on its first day, making it the highest first-day sales by a K-pop girl group.

== Studio albums ==
List of studio albums, showing selected details, selected chart positions, sales figures and certifications
Title	Details	Peak chart positions										Sales	Certifications
Title	Details	KOR	BEL (FL)	CRO	FRA	GER	JPN	POR	UK Dig.	US	US World	Sales	Certifications
Armageddon	Released: May 27, 2024; Label: SM, Virgin; Formats: CD, LP, digital download, streaming	2	94	14	77	45	4	5	52	25	1	WW: 1,600,000; KOR: 1,451,873; JPN: 25,230; US: 18,000	KMCA: Million
Lemonade	Released: May 29, 2026; Label: SM; Formats: CD, digital download, streaming	1	19	4	13	27	2	21	15	9	1	KOR: 1,083,766; JPN: 32,063; US: 34,500	KMCA: 3× Platinum

== Extended plays ==
=== Korean extended plays ===
List of Korean extended plays, showing selected details, selected chart positions, sales figures and certifications
Title	Details	Peak chart positions										Sales	Certifications
Title	Details	KOR	AUS	BEL (FL)	CRO	FRA	HUN	JPN	POL	US	US World	Sales	Certifications
Savage	Released: October 5, 2021; Label: SM; Formats: CD, digital download, streaming	1	—	193	17	—	—	7	—	20	1	KOR: 795,332; JPN: 28,368; US: 17,500	KMCA: 3× Platinum
Girls	Released: July 8, 2022; Label: SM, Warner; Formats: CD, digital download, streaming	1	55	89	2	79	4	3	40	3	1	KOR: 1,850,454; JPN: 66,623; US: 71,000	KMCA: Million
My World	Released: May 8, 2023; Label: SM, Warner; Formats: CD, digital download, streaming, SMC	1	67	—	1	26	30	3	13	9	1	WW: 2,100,000; KOR: 2,174,858; JPN: 53,442; US: 39,000	KMCA: 2× Million
Drama	Released: November 10, 2023; Label: SM, Warner; Formats: CD, digital download, streaming	3	— (Note: Drama did not enter the ARIA Albums Chart, but peaked at number 4 on the ARIA Hitseekers Albums Chart.)	—	5	30	19	5	28	33	2	WW: 1,500,000; KOR: 1,381,885; JPN: 28,973	KMCA: Million
Whiplash	Released: October 21, 2024; Label: SM, Virgin; Formats: CD, LP, digital download, streaming	1	—	77	10	79	—	4	—	50	2	WW: 1,300,000; KOR: 1,133,467; JPN: 34,899; US: 14,000	KMCA: Million
Rich Man	Released: September 5, 2025; Label: SM, Capitol; Formats: CD, digital download, streaming	4	—	77	7	66	—	7	—	14	—	WW: 1,130,000; KOR: 1,171,157; JPN: 63,233	KMCA: Million
"—" denotes a recording that did not chart or was not released in that territory

=== Japanese extended plays ===
List of Japanese extended plays, showing selected details, selected chart positions, sales figures and certifications
Title	Details	Peak chart positions		Sales	Certifications
Title	Details	JPN	FRA	Sales	Certifications
Kiss n Tell	Released: July 24, 2026; Label: SM, Warner Japan; Formats: CD, digital download, streaming	2	41	JPN: 70,804	RIAJ: Gold (Note: Physical certification)

== Single albums ==
List of single albums, showing selected details, selected chart positions, sales figures and certifications
Title	Details	Peak chart positions	Sales	Certifications
Title	Details	KOR	Sales	Certifications
Dirty Work	Released: June 27, 2025; Label: SM; Formats: CD, digital download, streaming	1	KOR: 1,078,642	KMCA: Million

=== Compilation single albums ===
List of compilation single albums, showing selected details, and selected chart positions
Title	Details	Peak chart positions
Title	Details	JPN Cmb.
Synk: Parallel Line	Released: October 9, 2024; Label: SM; Formats: Digital download, streaming	20
Synk: Aexis Line	Released: November 17, 2025; Label: SM; Formats: Digital download, streaming	—
Synk: Aexis Line 2026	Released: August 9, 2026; Label: SM; Formats: Digital download, streaming	—
Synk: Complaexity	Released: September 14, 2026; Label: SM; Formats: Digital download, streaming	—
"—" denotes a recording that did not chart

== Singles ==
=== Korean singles ===
List of Korean singles, showing year released, selected chart positions, sales figures, certifications and album name
Title	Year	Peak chart positions										Sales	Certifications	Album
Title	Year	KOR	HK	JPN Cmb.	JPN Hot	MLY (Note: Prior the establishment of the Official Malaysia Chart on January 23, 2025, the RIM International Chart was used.)	NZ Hot	SGP	TWN	US World	WW	Sales	Certifications	Album
"Black Mamba"	2020	49	—	—	—	14	37	13	—	5	138	WW: 3,000	RIAJ: Gold (Note: Streaming certification)	Non-album singles
"Forever" (약속)	2021	— (Note: "Forever" did not enter the Gaon Digital Chart, but debuted and peaked at position 28 and position 63 on component Download Chart and BGM Chart, respectively.)	—	—	—	—	—	—	—	11	—			Non-album singles
"Next Level"	2021	2	—	—	77	—	—	23	—	3	65		KMCA: 2× Platinum (Note: Streaming certification); RIAJ: Platinum (Note: Streaming certification)	Non-album singles
"Savage"	2021	2	—	—	60	14	—	14	—	13	39		KMCA: Platinum; RIAJ: Platinum (Note: Streaming certification)	Savage
"Dreams Come True"	2021	8	—	—	—	—	—	— (Note: "Dreams Come True" did not enter RIAS Top Streaming Chart, but peaked at position 8 on RIAS Top Regional Chart.)	—	7	197		RIAJ: Gold (Note: Streaming certification)	2021 Winter SM Town: SMCU Express
"Girls"	2022	8	15	35	30	—	23	13	8	6	42		RIAJ: Gold (Note: Streaming certification)	Girls
"Beautiful Christmas" (with Red Velvet)	2022	113	—	—	—	—	—	—	—	—	—			2022 Winter SM Town: SMCU Palace
"Welcome to My World" (featuring Naevis)	2023	64	—	—	—	—	—	— (Note: "Welcome to My World" did not enter RIAS Top Streaming Chart, but peaked at position 26 on RIAS Top Regional Chart.)	—	—	—			My World
"Spicy"	2023	2	24	— (Note: "Spicy" did not enter the Oricon Combined Singles Chart, but it peaked at number 43 on the Oricon Streaming Chart.)	64	—	34	22	14	6	70		KMCA: Platinum; RIAJ: Platinum (Note: Streaming certification)	My World
"Drama"	2023	2	4	36	34	4	15	7	3	8	38		KMCA: Platinum; RIAJ: Platinum (Note: Streaming certification)	Drama
"Regret of the Times" (시대유감)	2024	120	—	—	—	—	—	—	—	—	—			Non-album single
"Supernova"	2024	1	1	24	25	5	12	6	2	5	17	JPN: 1,338	KMCA: Platinum; RIAJ: Platinum (Note: Streaming certification)	Armageddon
"Armageddon"	2024	4	9	— (Note: "Armagedon" did not enter the Oricon Combined Singles Chart, but it peaked at number 41 on the Oricon Streaming Chart.)	63	5	24	8	6	—	28		RIAJ: Gold (Note: Streaming certification)	Armageddon
"Whiplash"	2024	2	3	8	7	—	12	7	2	—	8	JPN: 7,636	KMCA: Platinum; RIAJ: Platinum (Note: Streaming certification)	Whiplash
"Dirty Work"	2025	2	2	12	4	6	15	8	1	—	5	JPN: 2,349; WW: 6,000		Dirty Work
"Rich Man"	2025	3	5	41	27	— (Note: "Rich Man" did not enter the Official Malaysia Chart, but it peaked at number 16 on the RIM International Chart.)	14	19	2	—	30			Rich Man
"WDA (Whole Different Animal)" (featuring G-Dragon)	2026	12	15	—	56	—	15	27	4	—	185			Lemonade
"Lemonade"	2026	3	2	41	23	6	2	2	1	—	20	WW: 16,000		Lemonade
"—" denotes a recording that did not chart or was not released in that territory

=== Japanese singles ===
List of Japanese singles, showing year released, selected chart positions, sales figures, certifications and album name
Title	Year	Peak chart positions						Sales	Certifications	Album
Title	Year	KOR	JPN	JPN Cmb.	JPN Hot	NZ Hot	SGP Reg.	Sales	Certifications	Album
"Hot Mess"	2024	— (Note: "Hot Mess" did not enter the Circle Digital Chart, but debuted and peaked at position 103 on component Download Chart.)	2	2	6	—	—	JPN: 150,930	RIAJ: Platinum (Note: Physical certification)	Non-album single
"Kiss n Tell"	2026	174	—	— (Note: "Kiss N Tell" did not enter the Oricon Combined Singles Chart, but it peaked at number 38 on the Oricon Streaming Chart.)	32	15	19			Kiss n Tell
"—" denotes a recording that did not chart or was not released in that territory

=== English singles ===
List of English singles, showing year released, selected chart positions and album name
Title	Year	Peak chart positions								Album
Title	Year	KOR	KOR Songs	IDN Songs	JPN Hot	NZ Hot	SGP	VIE Hot	WW	Album
"Life's Too Short" (English version)	2022	47	11	18	91	—	— (Note: "Life's Too Short" did not enter RIAS Top Streaming Chart, but peaked at position 16 on RIAS Top Regional Chart.)	27	184	Girls
"Better Things"	2023	50	—	—	— (Note: "Better Things" did not enter the Billboard Japan Hot 100, but it peaked at number 82 on Japan Download Songs.)	24	—	63	175	Non-album single
"—" denotes a recording that did not chart or was not released in that territory

=== Promotional singles ===
List of promotional singles, showing year released, selected chart positions, certifications and album name
Title	Year	Peak chart positions					Certifications	Album
Title	Year	KOR	KOR Songs	SGP	VIE Hot	WW	Certifications	Album
"Illusion" (도깨비불)	2022	14	4	— (Note: "Illusion" did not enter the RIAS Top Streaming Chart, but peaked at number 15 on the RIAS Top Regional Chart.)	39	— (Note: "Illusion" did not enter the Billboard Global 200, but peaked at number 150 on the Billboard Global Excl. US chart.)	RIAJ: Gold (Note: Streaming certification)	Girls
"Jingle Bell Rock"	2023	142	—	—	—	—		Non-album single
"Dark Arts"	2025	153	—	—	—	—		Non-album single
"Santa Baby"	2026	—	—	—	—	—		Non-album single
"—" denotes a recording that did not chart or was not released in that territory

== Soundtrack appearances ==
List of soundtrack appearances, showing year released, selected chart positions and album name
Title	Year	Peak chart positions				Album
Title	Year	KOR DL	NZ Hot	SGP Reg.	VIE Hot	Album
"Hold on Tight"	2023	116	32	20	30	Tetris
"We Go"	2023	63	—	—	—	Pokémon Horizons: The Series
"Zoom Zoom"	2023	198	—	—	—	Beyblade X and Hot Mess
"Get Goin'"	2024	—	—	—	—	Fraggle Rock: Back to the Rock – Season 2
"Die Trying" (with Tokimonsta)	2024	—	—	—	—	Rebel Moon: Songs of the Rebellion
"We Go" (English version)	2024	68	—	—	—	Pokémon Horizons: The Series
"Dollhouse World"	2025	—	—	—	—	Gabby's Dollhouse: The Movie
"Keychain" (with Anderson .Paak)	2026	46	—	—	—	K-Pops!
"Attitude"	2026	—	—	—	—	Kill Blue and Kiss n Tell
"—" denotes a recording that did not chart or was not released in that territory

== Other charted songs ==
List of other charted songs, showing year released, selected chart positions, certifications and album name
Title	Year	Peak chart positions									Certifications	Album
Title	Year	KOR	KOR Billb. (Note: Includes the Billboard K-pop Hot 100 (discontinued since April 30, 2022; re-launched as Billboard Korea Hot 100 in December 3, 2025 and discontinued since April 11, 2026), and the subsequent South Korea Songs chart (launched in May 7, 2022 and discontinued since January 18, 2025).)	HK	JPN Hot	NZ Hot	SGP	TWN	VIE Hot	WW	Certifications	Album
"Next Level" (Habstrakt Remix)	2021	— (Note: "Next Level" (Habstrakt Remix) did not enter the Gaon Digital Chart, but debuted and peaked at position 183 on the component Download Chart.)	—	—	—	—	—	—	—	—		iScreaM Vol. 10 : Next Level Remixes
"Aenergy"	2021	117	82	—	—	—	—	—	—	—		Savage
"I'll Make You Cry"	2021	154	—	—	—	—	—	—	—	—		Savage
"Yeppi Yeppi"	2021	115	—	—	—	—	—	—	—	—		Savage
"Iconic"	2021	152	—	—	—	—	—	—	—	—		Savage
"Lucid Dream" (자각몽)	2021	141	—	—	—	—	—	—	—	—		Savage
"Lingo"	2022	— (Note: "Lingo" did not enter the Circle Digital Chart, but debuted and peaked at position 73 on the component Download Chart.)	—	—	—	—	—	—	—	—		Girls
"Life's Too Short"	2022	190	—	—	—	—	—	—	—	—		Girls
"ICU" (쉬어가도 돼)	2022	— (Note: "ICU" did not enter the Circle Digital Chart, but debuted and peaked at position 68 on the component Download Chart.)	—	—	—	—	—	—	—	—		Girls
"Girls" (Brllnt Remix)	2022	— (Note: "Girls" (Brllnt Remix) did not enter the Circle Digital Chart, but debuted and peaked at position 165 on the component Download Chart.)	—	—	—	—	—	—	—	—		iScreaM Vol.18 : Girls Remixes
"Salty & Sweet"	2023	59	—	—	—	—	—	—	—	—		My World
"Thirsty"	2023	30	—	—	—	—	—	—	75	—		My World
"I'm Unhappy"	2023	108	—	—	—	—	—	—	—	—		My World
"'Til We Meet Again"	2023	156	—	—	—	—	—	—	—	—		My World
"Trick or Trick"	2023	— (Note: "Trick or Trick" did not enter the Circle Digital Chart, but debuted and peaked at position 69 on the component Download Chart.)	—	—	—	—	—	—	—	—		Drama
"Don't Blink"	2023	— (Note: "Don't Blink" did not enter the Circle Digital Chart, but debuted and peaked at position 67 on the component Download Chart.)	—	—	—	—	—	—	—	—		Drama
"Hot Air Balloon"	2023	— (Note: "Hot Air Balloon" did not enter the Circle Digital Chart, but debuted and peaked at position 72 on the component Download Chart.)	—	—	—	—	—	—	—	—		Drama
"YOLO"	2023	— (Note: "YOLO" did not enter the Circle Digital Chart, but debuted and peaked at position 73 on the component Download Chart.)	—	—	—	—	—	—	—	—		Drama
"You"	2023	— (Note: "You" did not enter the Circle Digital Chart, but debuted and peaked at position 68 on the component Download Chart.)	—	—	—	—	—	—	—	—		Drama
"Set the Tone"	2024	95	—	—	—	—	—	—	—	—		Armageddon
"Mine"	2024	122	—	—	—	—	—	—	—	—		Armageddon
"Licorice"	2024	116	—	—	—	—	—	—	—	—		Armageddon
"Bahama"	2024	119	—	—	—	—	—	—	—	—		Armageddon
"Long Chat (#♥︎)"	2024	120	—	—	—	—	—	—	—	—		Armageddon
"Prologue"	2024	126	—	—	—	—	—	—	—	—		Armageddon
"Live My Life"	2024	56	—	—	—	—	—	—	—	—		Armageddon
"Melody" (목소리)	2024	136	—	—	—	—	—	—	—	—		Armageddon
"Sun and Moon"	2024	— (Note: "Sun and Moon" did not enter the Circle Digital Chart, but debuted and peaked at position 156 on the component Download Chart.)	—	—	—	—	—	—	—	—		Hot Mess
"Supernova" (Grimes Remix)	2024	— (Note: "Supernova" (Grimes Remix) did not enter the Circle Digital Chart, but debuted and peaked at position 159 on the component Download Chart.)	—	—	—	—	—	—	—	—		iScreaM Vol.33 : Supernova / Armageddon Remixes
"Up" (Karina solo)	2024	2	1	9	50	17	11	3	—	27	RIAJ: Gold (Note: Streaming certification)	Synk: Parallel Line
"Dopamine" (Giselle solo)	2024	162	—	—	—	—	—	—	—	—		Synk: Parallel Line
"Bored!" (Ningning solo)	2024	178	—	—	—	—	—	—	—	—		Synk: Parallel Line
"Spark" (Winter solo)	2024	100	—	—	—	—	—	—	—	—		Synk: Parallel Line
"Supernova" (Kenzie reworks)	2024	— (Note: "Supernova" (Kenzie reworks) did not enter the Circle Digital Chart, but debuted and peaked at position 111 on the component Download Chart.)	—	—	—	—	—	—	—	—		Re:works
"Kill It"	2024	88	—	—	—	—	—	—	—	—		Whiplash
"Flights, Not Feelings"	2024	114	—	—	—	—	—	—	—	—		Whiplash
"Pink Hoodie"	2024	131	—	—	—	—	—	—	—	—		Whiplash
"Flowers"	2024	108	—	—	—	—	—	—	—	—		Whiplash
"Just Another Girl"	2024	123	—	—	—	—	—	—	—	—		Whiplash
"Whiplash" (English version)	2025	— (Note: "Whiplash" (English Version) did not enter the Circle Digital Chart, but debuted and peaked at position 97 on the component Download Chart.)	—	—	—	—	—	—	—	—		Whiplash (English Version)
"Dirty Work" (featuring Flo Milli)	2025	111	—	—	—	—	—	—	—	—		Dirty Work
"Dirty Work" (English version)	2025	— (Note: "Dirty Work" (English version) did not enter the Circle Digital Chart, but debuted and peaked at position 57 on the component Download Chart.)	—	—	—	—	—	—	—	—		Dirty Work
"Dirty Work" (Instrumental)	2025	— (Note: "Dirty Work" (Instrumental) did not enter the Circle Digital Chart, but debuted and peaked at position 137 on the component Download Chart.)	—	—	—	—	—	—	—	—		Dirty Work
"Dirty Work" (RayRay Remix)	2025	— (Note: "Dirty Work" (RayRay Remix) did not enter the Circle Digital Chart, but debuted and peaked at position 69 on the component Download Chart.)	—	—	—	—	—	—	—	—		Dirty Work (Remixes)
"Drift"	2025	191	—	—	—	—	—	—	—	—		Rich Man
"Count on Me"	2025	— (Note: "Count on Me" did not enter the Circle Digital Chart, but debuted and peaked at position 61 on the component Download Chart.)	—	—	—	33	—	—	—	—		Rich Man
"Angel #48"	2025	— (Note: "Angel #48" did not enter the Circle Digital Chart, but debuted and peaked at position 62 on the component Download Chart.)	—	—	—	—	—	—	—	—		Rich Man
"To the Girls"	2025	— (Note: "Angel #48" did not enter the Circle Digital Chart, but debuted and peaked at position 63 on the component Download Chart.)	—	—	—	—	—	—	—	—		Rich Man
"Bubble"	2025	— (Note: "Angel #48" did not enter the Circle Digital Chart, but debuted and peaked at position 65 on the component Download Chart.)	—	—	—	—	—	—	—	—		Rich Man
"Rich Man" (featuring Sevdaliza)	2025	— (Note: "Rich Man" (featuring Sevdaliza) did not enter the Circle Digital Chart, but debuted and peaked at position 194 on the component Download Chart.)	—	—	—	—	—	—	—	—		Rich Man (English version)
"Blue" (Winter solo)	2025	96	—	—	—	—	—	—	—	—		Synk: Aexis Line
"Ketchup and Lemonade" (Ningning solo)	2025	106	—	—	—	—	—	—	—	—		Synk: Aexis Line
"Tornado" (Giselle solo)	2025	— (Note: "Tornado" did not enter Circle Digital Chart but peaked at number 28 on Circle Download Chart)	—	—	—	—	—	—	—	—		Synk: Aexis Line
"Good Stuff" (Karina solo)	2025	69	—	—	—	—	—	—	—	—		Synk: Aexis Line
"Shakin'"	2026	141	—N/a	—	—	20	—	—	—	—		Lemonade
"Camouflage"	2026	157	—N/a	—	—	17	—	22	—	—		Lemonade
"'Til We Die"	2026	— (Note: "'Til We Die" did not enter the Circle Digital Chart, but debuted and peaked at position 34 on the component Download Chart.)	—N/a	—	—	—	—	—	—	—		Lemonade
"Can't Help Myself"	2026	— (Note: "Can't Help Myself" did not enter the Circle Digital Chart, but debuted and peaked at position 35 on the component Download Chart.)	—N/a	—	—	—	—	—	—	—		Lemonade
"Switchblade" (featuring Ty Dolla Sign)	2026	— (Note: "Switchblade" did not enter the Circle Digital Chart, but debuted and peaked at position 36 on the component Download Chart.)	—N/a	—	—	23	—	—	—	—		Lemonade
"Bite"	2026	— (Note: "Bite" did not enter the Circle Digital Chart, but debuted and peaked at position 38 on the component Download Chart.)	—N/a	—	—	—	—	—	—	—		Lemonade
"My Plan"	2026	— (Note: "My Plan" did not enter the Circle Digital Chart, but debuted and peaked at position 39 on the component Download Chart.)	—N/a	—	—	—	—	—	—	—		Lemonade
"Roll"	2026	— (Note: "Roll" did not enter the Circle Digital Chart, but debuted and peaked at position 41 on the component Download Chart.)	—N/a	—	—	—	—	—	—	—		Lemonade
"Lemonade" (featuring Becky G)	2026	— (Note: "Lemonade" did not enter the Circle Digital Chart, but debuted and peaked at position 47 on the component Download Chart.)	—N/a	—	—	—	—	—	—	—		Lemonade
"Lemonade" (Zedd Remix)	2026	— (Note: "Lemonade (Zedd Remix)" did not enter the Circle Digital Chart, but debuted and peaked at position 120 on the component Download Chart.)	—N/a	—	—	—	—	—	—	—		Non-album singles
"Lemonade" (Marlon Hoffstadt Remix)	2026	— (Note: "Lemonade (Marlon Hoffstadt Remix) did not enter the Circle Digital Chart, but debuted and peaked at position 156 on the component Download Chart.)	—N/a	—	—	—	—	—	—	—		Non-album singles
"Lemonade" (2Spades Remix)	2026	— (Note: "Lemonade (2Spades Remix" did not enter the Circle Digital Chart, but debuted and peaked at position 197 on the component Download Chart.)	—N/a	—	—	—	—	—	—	—		Non-album singles
"Serenade" (Karina and Winter)	2026	119	—N/a	—	—	—	—	—	—	—		Synk: Aexis Line 2026
"Lollipop" (Giselle and Ningning)	2026	— (Note: "Lollipop" did not enter the Circle Digital Chart, but debuted and peaked at position 36 on the component Download Chart.)	—N/a	—	—	—	—	—	—	—		Synk: Aexis Line 2026
"16 Bit" (Karina)	2026	81	—N/a	—	—	—	—	—	—	— (Note: "16 Bit" did not enter the Billboard Global 200, but peaked at number 149 on the Billboard Global Excl. US chart.)		Synk: Complaexity
"Saddle Up" (Winter)	2026	15	—N/a	—	—	—	—	—	—	— (Note: "Saddle Up" did not enter the Billboard Global 200, but peaked at number 108 on the Billboard Global Excl. US chart.)		Synk: Complaexity
"I Love You But I Gotta Let You Go" (Ningning)	2026	86	—N/a	—	—	—	—	—	—	—		Synk: Complaexity
"ByeB4Hello" (Giselle)	2026	— (Note: "BYEB4HELLO " did not enter the Circle Digital Chart, but debuted and peaked at position 48 on the component Download Chart.)	—N/a	—	—	—	—	—	—	—		Synk: Complaexity
"—" denotes a recording that did not chart or was not released in that territory

== Guest appearances ==
List of other appearances, showing year released, selected chart positions and album name
Title	Year	Peak chart position	Other artist(s)	Album
Title	Year	KOR	Other artist(s)	Album
"Over You"	2024	—	Jacob Collier, Chris Martin	Djesse Vol. 4
"Rum Pum Pum Pum"	2025	— (Note: "Rum Pum Pum Pum" did not enter the Circle Digital Chart, but debuted and peaked at position 82 on the component Download Chart.)	—N/a	2025 SM Town: The Culture, the Future
"Good Day 2025 (Telepathy + By the Moonlight Window)"	2025	21	G-Dragon, Hwang Jung-min, Defconn, Hong Jin-kyung, Jung Hyung-don, Jo Se-ho, Kian84, Ahn Sung-jae, Taeyang, Jung Hae-in, Hwang Kwang-hee, Yim Si-wan, Lee Soo-hyuk, Daesung, Code Kunst, CL, Kim Go-eun, Day6, BSS	Non-album single
"—" denotes a recording that did not chart

== See also ==
- Aespa videography
