= Synk: Hyper Line =

2023 concert tour by Aespa

- World tour by Aespa
- Promotional poster
- Associated albums: Savage; Girls; My World
- Start date: February 25, 2023
- End date: September 30, 2023
- Legs: 4
- No. of shows: 31

Aespa concert chronology
- Synk: Hyper Line (2023); Synk: Parallel Line (2024-2025)

Synk: Hyper Line was the first worldwide concert tour by South Korean girl group Aespa, in support of their extended plays Savage (2021), Girls (2022), and My World (2023). The tour began on February 25, 2023, in Seoul, South Korea and concluded on September 30, 2023, in Paris, France. The tour consisted of 31 concerts in 21 cities in 12 countries around the world.

== Background ==
On December 1, 2022, Aespa's official Japanese website announced that the group would hold their first concert tour in Japan. It was confirmed as part of the Aespa Live Tour 2023 "Synk: Hyper Line" on January 20, 2023. On the same day, SM Entertainment announced that Aespa would hold concerts in South Korea for the first time since their debut at the Jamsil Indoor Stadium on February 25 and 26. In April, two shows were added at the Tokyo Dome, and a show in Jakarta was added the following month. On May 19, the tour was expanded to North America, South America, and Europe with 14 dates.

== Set list ==
The section below contains the setlist of the concert.

Setlist in Seoul
1. "Girls"
2. "Aenergy"
3. "I'll Make You Cry"
4. "Savage"
5. "Menagerie" (Karina solo) (Note: Unreleased song)
6. "Illusion"
7. "Lucid Dream"
8. "Thirsty"
9. "Dreams Come True"
10. "Lips" (Winter solo)
11. "Life's Too Short" (Korean version)
12. "I'm Unhappy"
13. "Don't Blink"
14. "Lingo"
15. "2Hot4U" (Giselle solo)
16. "Iconic"
17. "Hot Air Balloon"
18. "Yeppi Yeppi"
19. "Yolo"
20. "Wake Up" (Ningning solo)
21. "Salty & Sweet"
22. "Next Level"
23. "Black Mamba"

Encore

24. "Till We Meet Again"
25. "ICU"
Setlist in Tokyo Dome
1. "Girls"
2. "Aenergy"
3. "I'll Make You Cry"
4. "Savage"
5. "Menagerie" (Karina solo)
6. "Illusion"
7. "Lucid Dream"
8. "Thirsty"
9. "Dreams Come True"
10. "Keep Going" (Giselle solo)
11. "Life's Too Short"
12. "I'm Unhappy"
13. "Lingo"
14. "Don't Blink"
15. "Shine We Are!" (Winter solo) (BoA cover)
16. "Iconic"
17. "Hot Air Balloon"
18. "Yeppi Yeppi"
19. "Hold on Tight (Remix)"
20. "Spicy"
21. "Yolo"
22. "Wake Up" (Ningning solo)
23. "Salty & Sweet"
24. "Next Level" (Band remix)
25. "Black Mamba" (Orchestra version)

Encore

26. "Till We Meet Again"
27. "Welcome to My World"
28. "ICU"
Setlist in North America & Europe
1. "Girls"
2. "Aenergy"
3. "I'll Make You Cry"
4. "Savage"
5. "Menagerie" (Karina solo)
6. "Illusion"
7. "Lucid Dream"
8. "Thirsty"
9. "Dreams Come True"
10. "Lips" (Winter solo)
11. "Life's Too Short" (English version)
12. "Welcome To My World"
13. "Don't Blink"
14. "2Hot4U" (Giselle solo)
15. "Yeppi Yeppi"
16. "Yolo"
17. "Hold on Tight"
18. "Spicy"
19. "Better Things"
20. "Wake Up" (Ningning solo)
21. "Salty & Sweet"
22. "Next Level"
23. "Black Mamba"

Encore

24. "Till We Meet Again"
25. "ICU"

=== Notes ===
- At the second show at Jamsil Arena in Seoul, Aespa sang a cappella version of "Forever".
- Winter was absent from the Nagoya shows due to health issues.
- Starting from Jakarta's show, "Iconic" was replaced with "Spicy".
- Starting from Dallas's show, "I'm Unhappy" was replaced with "Welcome to My World", "Lingo" and "Hot Air Balloon" were taken out of the setlist and "Hold on Tight" and "Better Things" were added.
- At the Berlin show, "I'll Make You Cry" and "Dreams Come True" were not performed for unknown reasons. They both returned for the London show.
- At the Paris show, "I'll Make You Cry" was also not performed.

== Tour dates ==
List of 2023 concerts, showing date, city, country, venue, attendance and gross revenue
Date (2023)	City	Country	Venue	Attendance
February 25	Seoul	South Korea	Jamsil Arena; Beyond Live (Note: February 26 only.)	10,000
February 26	Seoul	South Korea	Jamsil Arena; Beyond Live	10,000
March 15	Osaka	Japan	Osaka-jō Hall	110,000
March 16	Osaka	Japan	Osaka-jō Hall	110,000
March 18	Osaka	Japan	Osaka-jō Hall	110,000
March 19	Osaka	Japan	Osaka-jō Hall	110,000
April 1	Tokyo	Japan	Yoyogi National Gymnasium	110,000
April 2	Tokyo	Japan	Yoyogi National Gymnasium	110,000
April 15	Saitama	Japan	Saitama Super Arena	110,000
April 16	Saitama	Japan	Saitama Super Arena	110,000
April 29	Nagoya	Japan	Nippon Gaishi Hall	110,000
April 30	Nagoya	Japan	Nippon Gaishi Hall	110,000
June 24	Jakarta	Indonesia	Indonesia Convention Exhibition	7,000
July 29	Bangkok	Thailand	Thunder Dome	10,000
July 30	Bangkok	Thailand	Thunder Dome	10,000
August 5	Tokyo	Japan	Tokyo Dome	94,000
August 6	Tokyo	Japan	Tokyo Dome	94,000
August 13	Los Angeles	United States	Crypto.com Arena	10,000
August 18	Dallas	United States	The Pavilion at Toyota Music Factory	—
August 22	Miami	United States	James L. Knight Center	—
August 25	Atlanta	United States	Fox Theatre	—
August 27	Washington, D.C.	United States	The Theater at MGM National Harbor	—
August 30	Chicago	United States	Rosemont Theatre	—
September 2	Boston	United States	MGM Music Hall	—
September 5	New York City	United States	Barclays Center	—
September 8	Mexico City	Mexico	Palacio de los Deportes	—
September 11	São Paulo	Brazil	Espaço Unimed	8,000
September 14	Santiago	Chile	Teatro Caupolicán	5,000
September 25	Berlin	Germany	Columbiahalle	—
September 28	London	England	The O_{2} Arena	10,000
September 30	Paris	France	Dôme de Paris	5,000
Total				269,000 (Note: This tally reflects only reported figures available in the table and should not be read as the tour's total attendance.)
