= Better Things (Aespa song) =

Single by Aespa
- Released: August 18, 2023
- Genre: Dance
- Length: 3:23
- Label: SM; Warner
- Songwriters: Leroy Clampitt; Rachel Keen
- Producers: Clampitt; Keen

Aespa singles chronology
"Spicy" (2023)	"Better Things" (2023)	"We Go" (2023)

Audio sample
- file; help

Music video
- "Better Things" on YouTube

Professional ratings
Review scores
Source	Rating
IZM	3/5 stars

"Better Things" is a song by South Korean girl group Aespa. It was released on August 18, 2023, through SM Entertainment and Warner Records as the group's first original English single. (Note: For other English-language songs by Aespa, see § Background.) The song was the group's second release of 2023, following their third extended play, My World, in May. To promote the song, Aespa aired a 3 episode long web series sitcom show, Better Things, with its first episode released on August 7. Originally released as a standalone single, the song was later included in the digital edition of the group's fourth extended play Drama, which was released on November 10, 2023.

== Background ==
Prior to the release of "Better Things", Aespa released a non-Korean song in 2022, the English version of "Life's Too Short" from the group's second extended play, Girls. The song received positive reviews from music critics for its lyrics and a "catchy" melody. On March 31, 2023, they released their second English song, "Hold On Tight", for the soundtrack of the Apple Original Film Tetris.

On July 27, 2023, Aespa began teasing their upcoming release "Better Things" that was later revealed to be released on August 18. On July 31, the group unveiled a teaser for the single which included an "8-bit-inspired" snippet of the song playing over a visual of a "retro handheld water ring toss game". Before the release of the single, SM Entertainment released the first episode of the group's web series sitcom, Better Things, on August 7. Two days later, it was announced that Aespa would perform the song on August 13 at the first show of the American leg of their Synk: Hyper Line tour at the Crypto.com Arena in Los Angeles. The same day, the group released the summer-themed teaser photos.

== Composition ==
"Better Things" was described as an up-tempo minimalistic dance song. The track features a rhythmic percussion sound "that goes well with summer" alongside a "unique rhythm pattern" and "rich vocals" of the group. The lyrics talk about giving focus to more valuable things in life.

== Promotion ==
On August 4, a snippet of "Better Things" was revealed on TikTok before the song's official release. Aespa would debut "Better Things" at the first show of the American leg of their Synk: Hyper Line tour on August 13. The group also appeared on the magazine cover of Dork's September 2023 issue.

To promote the release of the single, Aespa filmed a three-episode sitcom web series, Better Things, with the first episode uploaded on August 7. Other episodes were released on August 9 and 11, respectively. Ningning only appeared in limited parts of the sitcom, due to her health conditions at the time of filming. The show received a "favorable" response from fans for the chemistry between Aespa members and their "skillful acting".

== Accolades ==
Award and nominations for "Better Things"
Year	Organization	Award	Result	Ref.
2023	Asian Pop Music Awards	Song of the Year (Overseas)	Nominated	
2023	Asian Pop Music Awards	Top 20 Songs of the Year (Overseas)	Won	

== Track listings ==
- Streaming/digital download
1. "Better Things" – 3:23
- Streaming/digital download – Sped Up + Slowed Down
1. "Better Things" (Sped Up version) – 3:00
2. "Better Things" (Slowed Down version) – 3:47
3. "Better Things" (Snack version) – 0:45
4. "Better Things" – 3:23
- Streaming/digital download – Tropkillaz remix
1. "Better Things" (Tropkillaz remix) – 3:00
2. "Better Things" – 3:23
- Streaming/digital download – Raye remix
1. "Better Things" (Raye remix) – 3:25
2. "Better Things" – 3:23
- Streaming/digital download – Dance remix
1. "Better Things" (Dance remix) – 3:14
2. "Better Things" – 3:23
- CD single
1. "Better Things" – 3:23
2. "Better Things" (Sped Up version) – 3:00
3. "Better Things" (Slowed Down version) – 3:47
4. "Better Things" (Snack version) – 0:45
5. "Better Things" (Tropkillaz remix) – 3:00
6. "Better Things" (Instrumental) – 3:23

== Charts ==
=== Weekly charts ===
Weekly chart performance for "Better Things"
Chart (2023)	Peak position
Global 200 (Billboard)	175
Japan Download (Billboard Japan)	82
Netherlands (Global Top 40)	13
New Zealand Hot Singles (RMNZ)	24
South Korea (Circle)	50
Vietnam (Vietnam Hot 100)	63

=== Monthly charts ===
Monthly chart performance for "Better Things"
Chart (2023)	Position
South Korea (Circle)	53

== Release history ==
Release history for "Better Things"
Region	Date	Format	Version	Label
Various	August 18, 2023	Digital download; streaming	Original	SM; Warner
Various	September 8, 2023	Digital download; streaming	Sped Up; Slowed Down; Snack	SM; Warner
Various	September 22, 2023	Digital download; streaming	Tropkillaz remix	SM; Warner
Various	September 29, 2023	Digital download; streaming	Raye remix	SM; Warner
Various	October 27, 2023	Digital download; streaming	Dance remix	SM; Warner
United States	October 27, 2023	CD single	Original; Sped Up; Slowed Down; Snack; Tropkillaz remix; Instrumental	SM; Warner
