= Beautiful Christmas =

Single by Red Velvet and Aespa

from the album 2022 Winter SM Town: SMCU Palace
- Language: Korean
- Released: December 14, 2022
- Studio: SM LVYIN (Seoul); Golden Bell Tree Sound (Seoul)
- Genre: Christmas music
- Length: 3:29
- Label: SM; Kakao
- Composers: Justin Reinstein; Alysa (@Number K); JJean (@Number K)
- Lyricist: Kim Jae-won

Red Velvet singles chronology
"Birthday" (2022)	"Beautiful Christmas" (2022)	"Chill Kill" (2023)

Aespa singles chronology
"Girls" (2022)	"Beautiful Christmas" (2022)	"Hold on Tight" (2023)

Music video
- "Beautiful Christmas" on YouTube

"Beautiful Christmas" is a song recorded by South Korean girl group Red Velvet and Aespa for SM Entertainment's special winter album 2022 Winter SM Town: SMCU Palace. It was released as the album's lead single by SM Entertainment on December 14, 2022.

== Background and release ==
On December 1, 2022, it was announced that SM Entertainment would release its tenth Christmas album, which would include various collaborations between the company's artists. On December 9 and 10, concept photos for the single were released, featuring individual member images as well as group photos, followed by the teaser for the music video on December 13. The song, along with its music video, was released on December 14 across various music platforms.

== Composition ==
"Beautiful Christmas" was written by Kim Jae-won, composed by Justin Reinstein with Alysa and JJean from @Number K, and arranged by Alysa. It was described as a cheerful Christmas song that blends elements of dance music and carols, featuring piano instrumentation and an upbeat swing rhythm centered around a rhythmic bass line. The lyrics express the excitement of Christmas, reflect on the year gone by, and celebrate the company of someone special. The song highlights the fresh vocal synergy between Red Velvet and Aespa, perfectly capturing the festive spirit and enhancing the holiday atmosphere.

== Promotion ==
Red Velvet and Aespa performed the song together for the first time during the SM Town Live 2023: SMCU Palace on January 1, 2023.

== Credits and personnel ==
Credits adapted from 2022 Winter SM Town: SMCU Palace liner notes.

Studio

- SM LVYIN Studio – recording
- Golden Bell Tree Sound – recording
- SM Big Shot Studio – digital editing, engineered for mix
- SM Blue Ocean Studio – mixing
- 821 Sound – mastering

Personnel

- SM Entertainment – executive producer
- Lee Soo-man – producer
- Red Velvet – vocals, background vocals
- Aespa – vocals, background vocals
- Kim Jae-won – lyrics
- Alysa (@Number K) – composition, arrangement
- JJean (@Number K) – composition
- Justin Reinstein – composition
- Emily Kim Yeon-seo – vocal directing
- Lee Ji-hong – recording
- Kim Kwang-min – recording
- Lee Min-kyu – digital editing, engineered for mix
- Kim Cheol-sun – mixing
- Kwon Nam-woo – mastering

== Charts ==
=== Weekly charts ===
Weekly chart performance for "Beautiful Christmas"
Chart (2022)	Peak position
South Korea (Circle)	113

=== Monthly charts ===
Monthly chart performance for "Beautiful Christmas"
Chart (2022)	Position
South Korea (Circle)	187

== Release history ==
Release history for "Beautiful Christmas"
Region	Date	Format	Label
Various	December 14, 2022	Digital download; streaming	SM; Kakao
