= Illusion (Aespa song) =

Promotional single by Aespa

from the EP Girls
- Language: Korean
- Released: June 1, 2022
- Genre: Synth-pop; electronic; hip hop; dance; EDM trap
- Length: 3:15
- Label: SM; Warner; Dreamus
- Lyricist: Lee Thor (Lalala Studio)
- Producers: G'harah "PK" Degeddingseze; Patricia “Tricia” Battani; Steve Octave

Lyric video
- "Illusion" on YouTube

"Illusion" (Korean: 도깨비불; RR: Dokkaebibul; lit. 'Will-o'-the-wisp') is a promotional single recorded by South Korean girl group Aespa for their second extended play Girls. It was released on June 1, 2022, by SM Entertainment and Warner Records as a surprise pre-release track from the EP. Written by Lee Thor (Lalala Studio) while production handled by G'harah "PK" Degeddingseze, Patricia Battani, and Steve Octave, "Illusion" is an electronic "high-energy" hip hop, synth-pop and dance song with bass-heavy chorus, and elements indicative of hyperpop.

== Background and release ==
On June 1, 2022, SM Entertainment announced Aespa would be releasing their second extended play Girls on July 8. Alongside the announcement, Aespa surprise released "Illusion" as a pre-release track from the EP, accompanied by "futuristic-looking" lyric video on the same day. It marks the group's first material to be released under their record contract with Warner Records.

== Development and composition ==
"Illusion" was written by Lee Thor (Lalala Studio) with composition and arrangement handled by G'harah "PK" Degeddingseze, Patricia “Tricia” Battani, and Steve Octave. The song was described as an electronic "high-energy" hip hop, synth-pop, dance and EDM-trap song with "punchy 808 bass and kicking sound that catches the ears". It consists of elements indicative of hyperpop, including an "eccentric percussion to hi-hats and electric, woodblock-like clicks". Lyrically, the song was described as having "Aespa's own color expressed" such as "comparing the desire to seduce and devour one's opponent to goblin fire". The song also features the slurping sound from one of the song's producers, Patricia “Tricia” Battani. "Illusion" was composed in the key of D minor, with a tempo of 90 beats per minute.

In an interview with The Art Of Listening, the song's producers G'harah "PK" Degeddingsezeand and Tricia Battani stated that the lyrics "Yummy Yummy in my Tummy Tummy" were inspired by the fragment lines of the 2008 action thriller film Punisher: War Zone. They also revealed that the song was originally called "Dessert" and featured lyrics about "being a delicious, enticing dessert".

== Critical reception ==
The song received positive reviews from music critics. Crystal Bell of Nylon described the song as "synthpop siren's call with a deliciously dirty bassline", and that it "highlights each member's vocal charms". Writing for Consequence of Sound, Mary Siroky named the song as "a high-energy 'sneak peek' track" that offers "a vibrant beat and an earworm chorus". Clash's Robin Murray dubbed the track as a "sparkling, hook-laden return that sits in a synth-pop lane". In Billboard, reviewer S.B. wrote that the song is a "sinister track [that] continues to explore the group’s cyber-futurism theme". Mashable ranked the song at number 11 in their list of "The 16 best K-pop songs of 2022 (so far)", writing: "To mark the start of their new era, aespa dropped "Illusion," an electronic pre-release track that builds on the group’s synth-pop calling and affinity for sticky, hypnotic hooks".

Rolling Stone's Kristine Kwak stated the song is "a loser to Aespa’s traditional futuristic synth-heavy sound" and called it "a fan favorite and rightfully so". Writing for Beats Per Minute, Chase McMullen labelled it as the "sort of song that has the power to get you dancing in the middle of a bar, not caring the least about an onlooker as you weave to its every move". Rhian Daly of NME thought it was "the best song on this record" with "minimal, shadowy verses before hitting a hypnotically lowkey refrain".

Year-end lists for "Illusion"
Publisher	Listicle	Placement	Ref.
Amazon Music	Best of 2022: K-Pop	37	
Consequence	Top 50 Songs of 2022	35th	
Cosmopolitan	The 15 Best K-pop Songs of 2022	13th	
Deezer	K-POP 2022 Hits	Placed	
Hypebae	Best K-Pop Songs and Music Videos of 2022	18	
Idology	Top 20 Songs of 2022	Placed	
MTV	The 22 Best K-pop B-Sides of 2022	5th	
NME	The 25 best K-pop songs of 2022	17th	
The Review Geek	15 Best K-Pop Songs of 2022	Placed	

== Commercial performance ==
"Illusion" debuted at number 120 on South Korea's Circle Digital Chart in the chart issue dated May 29 – June 4, 2022. It ascended to number fifteen in the chart issue dated September 2–8, 2022. Internationally, the song peaked at number 15 on the Singapore's RIAS Regional Top Chart, and number 39 on the Billboard Vietnam Hot 100. "Illusion" did not enter the Billboard Global 200, but peaked at number 150 on the Global Excl. US US chart.

== Promotion ==
On June 26 and 27 Aespa performed "Illusion" as part of a one-off concert titled the "Aespa Showcase Synk in LA". It was also sung during the group's live event called "Aespa Girls Comeback Live" on July 11 on YouTube and TikTok. The song was performed with "Girls" on two music programs: Mnet's M Countdown on July 14, and MBC's Show! Music Core on July 16.

== Credits and personnel ==
Credits adapted from the liner notes of Girls.

Studio

- SM Starlight Studio – recording, digital editing
- SM Blue Cup Studio – mixing

Personnel

- Aespa – vocals, background vocals
- Lee Thor (Lalala Studio) – lyrics
- G'harah "PK" Degeddingseze – composition, arrangement
- Steve Octave – composition
- Patricia Battani – arrangement
- Maxx Song – vocal directing, digital editing
- Jeong Yoo-ra – recording, digital editing
- Jung Eui-seok – mixing

== Charts ==
=== Weekly charts ===
Weekly chart performance for "Illusion"
Chart (2022)	Peak position
Global Excl. US (Billboard)	150
Singapore Top Regional (RIAS)	15
South Korea (Circle)	14
Vietnam (Vietnam Hot 100)	39

=== Monthly charts ===
Monthly chart performance for "Illusion"
Chart (2022)	Position
South Korea (Circle)	16

=== Year-end chart ===
2022 year-end chart performance for "Illusion"
Chart (2022)	Peak position
South Korea (Circle)	71

2023 year-end chart performance for "Illusion"
Chart (2023)	Position
South Korea (Circle)	119

== Certifications ==
Certifications for "Illusion"
Region	Certification	Certified units/sales
Streaming
Japan (RIAJ)	Gold	50,000,000^{†}
^{†} Streaming-only figures based on certification alone.

== Release history ==
Release history for "Illusion"
Region	Date	Format(s)	Label(s)
Various	June 1, 2022	Digital download; streaming	SM; Warner; Dreamus
