= Life's Too Short (Aespa song) =

- English version cover

Single by Aespa

from the EP Girls
- Language: English
- Released: June 24, 2022
- Genre: Pop; soft pop; bubblegum pop
- Length: 2:58
- Label: SM; Warner
- Songwriters: Uzoechi Emenike; Becky Hill; Sam Klempner
- Producer: Klempner

Aespa singles chronology
"Dreams Come True" (2021)	"Life's Too Short" (2022)	"Girls" (2022)

Music video
- "Life's Too Short " on YouTube

"Life's Too Short" is a song by the South Korean girl group Aespa, released on June 24, 2022, by SM Entertainment and Warner Records, as the pre-release single from the group's second extended play Girls. The song is the group's first song fully recorded in English. It was written by Uzoechi Emenike, Becky Hill and Sam Klempner and produced by Klempner. "Life's Too Short" is a mid-tempo pop, soft pop and bubblegum pop song, driven by an electric guitar riff. It is about staying true to oneself and doing what makes one happy, no matter what others have to say.

== Background and release ==
On April 19, 2022, it was announced that Aespa would be performing at the Coachella Valley Music and Arts Festival on April 23, as part of 88rising's Head in the Clouds Forever showcase. Their setlist included "Savage", "Next Level", "Black Mamba" and an English version of a new song titled "Life's Too Short", which was announced as a part of their upcoming release. On June 1, 2022, a teaser marking the release of Girls, was posted on the group's various social media accounts. It was also revealed that the group would release the English version of "Life's Too Short" as the second pre-release single from the EP on June 24. The song was released for digital download and streaming on June 24, 2022, by SM Entertainment and Warner Records.

== Composition ==
"Life's Too Short" was written by Uzoechi Emenike, Becky Hill and Sam Klempner and produced by Klempner. Musically, the song was described as a medium-tempo pop, soft pop and bubblegum pop song with a "catchy, electric guitar riff" and "bright, breezy and hopeful vocals". The song's lyrics have a "positive aspiration to enjoy a once-in-a-lifetime life as desired without regrets". "Life's Too Short" was composed in the key of C minor, with a tempo of 72 beats per minute. Aespa said that the song is a "reminder to all our MYs to stay true to yourselves and spread love because life is too short for hate".

== Critical reception ==
Billboard's Jason Lipshutz wrote that the song "slyly harkens back to some stone-cold classic singles from girl groups like the Spice Girls and Destiny's Child". Tomas Mier of Rolling Stone deemed the song "a soft bop, laced with a catchy chorus and danceable melody". Riddhi Chakraborty from Rolling Stone India described the song as "an anthem about staying true to yourself and doing what makes you happy – no matter what haters have to say".

Year-end lists for "Life's Too Short"
Critic/Publication	List	Rank	Ref.
Teen Vogue	The 79 Best K-Pop Songs of 2022	Placed	

== Music video ==
A scene in the music video, where Aespa is seen having a pillow fight at a sleepover.

An accompanying music video for the song was released at midnight on June 24, 2022, along with "Life's Too Short". The video was inspired by fashion, films and pop culture from the early 2000s in "hazy" tones of pink, purple and blue. The visual shows the group enjoy their lives, eschewing social media to have a sleepover, go to karaoke and attend photoshoots. It has references to films like Mean Girls and Clueless.

== Promotion ==
The group debuted "Life's Too Short" at the Coachella Valley Music and Arts Festival on April 23, 2022. On June 26 and 27, Aespa performed the song during a one-off concert titled the "Aespa Showcase Synk in LA". The group performed the song on Jimmy Kimmel Live! on June 29, 2022. They bagan Good Morning America's Summer Concert Series on July 8, 2022, with performances of "Life's Too Short", "Black Mamba", "Girls", "Illusion" and "Next Level".

== Track listing ==
- Digital download / streaming
1. "Life's Too Short (English Version)" – 2:58
2. "Life's Too Short" (Instrumental) – 2:58

== Credits and personnel ==
Credits adapted from the liner notes of Girls.

Studio

- SM SSAM Studio – recording
- SM Lvyin Studio – digital editing
- SM Blue Ocean Studio – mixing
- 821 Sound – mastering

Personnel

- Aespa – vocals, background vocals
- Uzoechi Emenike – English lyrics, composition
- Becky Hill – English lyrics, composition
- Sam Klempner – English lyrics, composition, arrangement
- Jang Jung-won – Korean lyrics
- MinGtion – vocal directing
- Oiaisle – background vocals
- Kang Eun-ji – recording
- Lee Ji-hong – digital editing
- Kim Cheol-sun – mixing
- Kwon Nam-woo – mastering

== Charts ==
=== Weekly charts ===
Chart performance for "Life's Too Short"
Chart (2022)	Peak position
Global 200 (Billboard)	184
Indonesia (Billboard)	18
Japan (Japan Hot 100)	96
Singapore Top Regional (RIAS)	16
South Korea (Circle) English version	47
South Korea (Circle)	190
Vietnam (Vietnam Hot 100)	27

=== Monthly charts ===
Monthly chart performance for "Life's Too Short"
Chart (2022)	Position
South Korea (Circle) English version	66

== Release history ==
Release history for "Life's Too Short"
Region	Date	Version	Format(s)	Label(s)
Various	June 24, 2022	English	Digital download; streaming	SM; Warner
Various	July 8, 2022	Korean	Digital download; streaming	SM
