= Savage (EP) =

- Digital cover

EP by Aespa
- Released: October 5, 2021
- Genres: Pop; dance-pop; electropop; hyperpop
- Length: 20:13
- Language: Korean
- Labels: SM; Dreamus
- Producer: Lee Soo-man

Aespa chronology
Savage (2021)	Girls (2022)

Singles from Savage
- 1. "Savage" Released: October 5, 2021

Savage is the first extended play by South Korean girl group Aespa. The EP was released by SM Entertainment on October 5, 2021, and is available in three versions—P.O.S, Synk Dive and Hallucination Quest. It contains six songs, including the lead single of the same name.

Primarily a pop record with elements of dance pop, hyperpop and electropop, the EP was intended to demonstrate the group's musical diversity. Composition and production of Savage were handled by a wide array of songwriters and producers, including Yoo Young-jin, Kenzie, Brandon Green, Marcus Lomax, and Hayley Kiyoko, with SM Entertainment founder Lee Soo-man serving as executive producer. Lyrically, the album continues to expand Aespa's virtual universe.

The EP was a commercial success and received positive reviews from music critics, who complimented its dark, futuristic "cyberpunk" style and incorporation of different music genres. Aespa's first entry on the US Billboard 200 at number 20, Savage also topped the Gaon Album Chart and was certified 2× Platinum by the Korea Music Content Association (KMCA) for selling 500,000 units. To promote the EP, Aespa appeared on South Korean music programs such as M Countdown, Music Bank, and Inkigayo.

== Background and recording ==
On September 13, 2021, SM Entertainment announced that Aespa would be releasing their first extended play titled Savage on October 5, containing six tracks. The EP was released for pre-order on September 14. On September 27, the tracklist and lead single "Savage" were revealed. The tracklist included participation from American singer-songwriter Hayley Kiyoko on the closing track "Lucid Dream". In an interview with the Grammy, Giselle revealed that they "actually didn't get to meet her and do an actual collaboration [even though] the song was made by her." The making of Savage marked the first time all the Aespa members recorded together in a studio, a process that turned out to be "a lot of fun for the members, who are all close friends." Ningning said that they had a great time recording the EP and got to try genres they haven't done before. According to the Paper magazine, Lee Soo-man, the founder of SM Entertainment and executive producer of their EP, "personally directed every small detail" of their production, including the pronunciation of every syllable.

Before recording, it's very important to deliver the message and the mood of the song. I really get into the character. For example, if I'm recording a song, I'll think of various scenes in my head, like a movie. "What character am I portraying? What's happening? How am I feeling?" Little things like that. After I do that and prepare myself, then I go on [and] record the music.

— Ningning looking back on recording Savage, Grammy

== Composition ==
Savage is primarily a pop record, specifically with elements of dance pop, hyperpop and electropop genres and a dark, futuristic "cyberpunk" style. It also incorporates an eclectic mix of house, deep house, R&B, dubstep, trap music, trance, and hip hop. Divyansha Dongre of Rolling Stone India described the EP as "multi-genre", and MTV noted that Savage "blends dance and pop with elements of house, trap, rap, and other genres." Rolling Stone stated that the record "showcases futuristic elements in its visuals and sound" and "further expands on the virtual world of Aespa."

When we were approached with the songs and the demos, we actually were very fond of it. We liked the songs, but [at the same time] we did have a lot of effort that we had to put in to make sure they actually sounded good and that we actually matched well with them. For example, Winter has a very soft voice, but in order to sing "Black Mamba," [which is a] little more powerful, she worked to show her vocals in a different style. We really enjoy trying something new. "Savage" was also new to us.

— Giselle on the diversity of Aespa's sound, Grammy

=== Songs ===
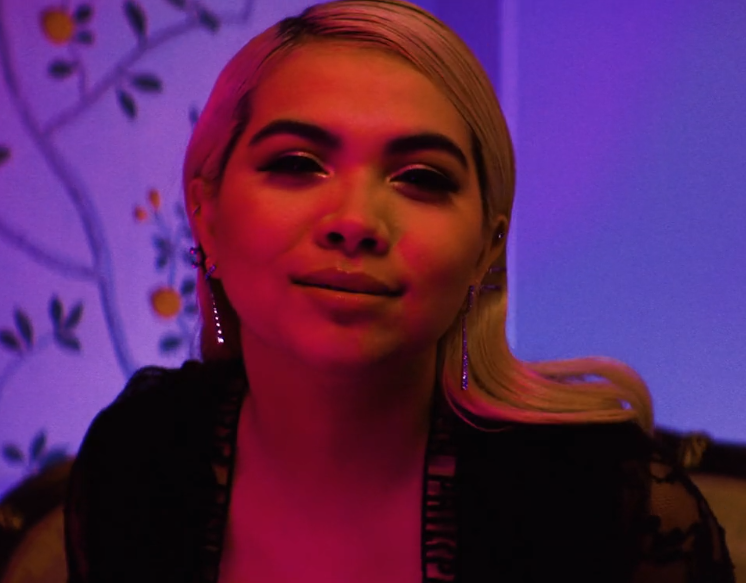
American singer-songwriter Hayley Kiyoko co-wrote the track "Lucid Dream".

The opening track, "Aenergy", is an "uplifting anthem" that explores "the group's members and the characteristics they showcase throughout their superheroine-like story, declaring each members' in-universe skills and abilities." Lead single "Savage" was described as "brilliant" in its eclectic blend of genres, including trap music, dubstep and intense power balladry with "drums and basses" as the main focus. Narrating the group's ongoing efforts to defy the Black Mamba, the track further elucidates Aespa and ae proceeding to the virtual world of Kwangya with the help of nævis. The song blends "addictive" hooks, rap verses and ad-libs while displaying the group's ability to take on varied vocals. NME positively compared the track to the work of Scottish musician Sophie Xeon. "I'll Make You Cry" is a dance-pop "fierce revenge anthem" with "a unique rhythm", "twinkling beats" and "ear-catching synth sound". "Haunting" belts escalate the song's "tenacious" atmosphere, along with "strong" vocal performances and "fierce" lyrics. The "eccentric", "high-energy" song "Yeppi Yeppi" is "bubbly" and features a combination of "deep house, trance, synthwave, and trap" genres, with lyrics containing the "positive message that if you think of yourself as beautiful rather than other people's opinions, then you will be happy". Winter named the song as her personal favorite. "Iconic" was described as a dance-pop song with "a force of revving production and fizzing hooks." It starts with "strong" hip hop and turns into "a series of alternatingly sweet and sassy verses all about how iconic Aespa is." The closing track, "Lucid Dream", is a dream pop alt R&B tune that emits a "hazy, ambient vibe" and features a "glitchy" electronic bridge. The song is a "poignant blur" of "hypnotic" synthesizers and "gentle" trap beats mixed with "intricate" layers of breathy vocals.

== Promotion and release ==
On September 14, 2021, Savage was made available for pre-order in three versions: P.O.S, Synk Dive, and Hallucination Quest. From September 23 to 25, the Hallucination Quest version of concept photos for the extended play was released. Synk Dive version and additional Hallucination Quest concept photos were released on September 26 and 29, respectively. The EP tracklist was revealed on September 27. The teaser for the music video of the lead single of the same name was released on October 4. The album was released on October 5, 2021, in physical and digital formats. The music video for lead single "Savage", directed by 725 (SL8 Visual Lab), was released on SM Entertainment's YouTube channel in conjunction with the release of the EP. On October 5, Aespa held a live event called "Synk Dive: Aespa 'Savage' Showcase" on YouTube to introduce the EP and communicate with their fans. The group also performed on NBC's The Kelly Clarkson Show on October 16, their broadcast debut on US network television.

== Critical reception ==
Professional ratings
Review scores
Source	Rating
AllMusic	3.5/5 stars
IZM	3.5/5 stars
laut.de	4/5 stars
NME	4/5 stars
PopMatters	7/10

AllMusic critic David Crone stated that the EP is "a glitchy, futuristic take on the K-Pop mini-album" that continues to "demonstrate the star power of Aespa's leading foursome". Tamar Herman of the South China Morning Post summarized Savage as "cohesive listening experience" that is "invigorating and satisfying", adding it was "successful in showcasing what the members of Aespa have to offer as one of most ambitious newer female K-pop acts out there." She also included it on her list of best K-pop releases of October 2021. Carmen Chin of NME awarded the EP four stars out of five, writing that "Savage's brand of vibrant, punchy electronic pop falls perfectly in sync with the unconventionality Aespa have so boldly presented in their one year as a group." MTV's Regina Kim stated that "Savage provides a sonic backdrop that exists outside this imagined world," and added that the EP is "giving listeners glimpses into an overarching fable." In her review for PopMatters, Ana Clara Ribeiro described Savage as "a well-scripted, high-budget cyberpunk film" that "doesn't necessarily make you feel good, but it is good, and that's why you watch it" because it "entertains and fascinates." She also named the track "I'll Make You Cry" a highlight on the EP.

=== Year-end lists ===
Savage on year-end lists
Critic/Publication	List	Rank	Ref.
Beats Per Minute	Top 20 EPs of 2021	Placed	
Harper's Bazaar	The Top 15 K-Pop Albums of 2021	8	
Genius	The Genius Community's 50 Best Albums of 2021	22	
Idology	Top 10 Albums of the Year	Placed	
NME	The 25 best Asian albums of 2021	17	
Nylon	The Top K-Pop Albums of 2021	Placed	
PopMatters	Top 20 Best K-pop Albums of 2021	15	
South China Morning Post	25 best K-pop albums of 2021	4	
The New York Times	Best Albums of 2021	Placed	

== Commercial performance ==
On October 5, it was reported that pre-orders for Savage reached 401,088 copies. According to the South Korean Hanteo Chart, the EP was the "best-selling debut album for girl group's on the chart" after it sold more than 200,000 copies on the second day of its release. In South Korea, it debuted atop the Gaon Album Chart on the chart issue dated October 3–9, 2021. The EP also topped the daily and weekly editions of album charts such as Hanteo Chart, Synnara Record, Kyobo Bookstore, and Gaon Retail Album Chart. Within 15 days of release, it was reported that Savage sold 513,292 copies. In Japan, it peaked at number 18 on Billboard Japan's Hot Albums chart and at number seven on the Oricon Albums Chart.

In the United States, Aespa made their debut on the Billboard 200 chart, with the EP entering at number 20 and becoming the highest-charting debut album by a K-pop girl group in Billboard history. Savage also placed first on Billboard's World Albums and Independent Albums charts and debuted at number two on the Top Album Sales chart with 17,500 units in pure sales.

== Accolades ==
Awards and nominations for Savage
Ceremony	Year	Award	Result	Ref.
Asian Pop Music Awards	2021	Top 20 Albums of the Year (Overseas)	Won	
Asian Pop Music Awards	2021	Best Album of the Year (Overseas)	Nominated	
Golden Disc Awards	2022	Album Bonsang	Nominated	
iF Product Design Award	2022	Main Prize (User Experience – Packaging)	Won	
Korean Music Awards	2022	Best K-pop Album	Nominated	
Mnet Asian Music Awards	2021	TikTok Album of the Year	Nominated	

== Track listing ==
Track listing for Savage
No.	Title	Lyrics	Music	Arrangement	Length
1.	"Aenergy"	Yoo Young-jin	Kill Dave; Pat Morrissey; Jess Corazza; Yoo Young-jin	Kill Dave; Pat Morrissey; Yoo Young-jin	2:27
2.	"Savage"	Yoo Young-jin	Kirsten Collins; Jia Lih; Yoo Young-jin; Hautboi Rich	Jia Lih; Yoo Young-jin	3:58
3.	"I'll Make You Cry"	Kenzie	Kenzie; Kirsten Collins; Timothy "BOS" Bullock; Brandon Green; Hautboi Rich	Timothy "BOS" Bullock; Brandon Green; Imlay	3:34
4.	"Yeppi Yeppi"	Deez; Saay	Coach & Sendo; Deez; Saay	Coach & Sendo; Soultriii	3:33
5.	"Iconic"	Jo Yoon-kyung	Sophie Curtis; Val Del Prete (153/Joombas); Timothy Tan	Timothy Tan	3:11
6.	"Lucid Dream" (Korean: 자각몽; RR: Jagangmong)	Ellie Suh (153/Joombas)	Kill Dave; Pat Morrissey; Hayley Kiyoko; Paul Phamous; Marcus Lomax	Kill Dave; Pat Morrissey; Imlay	3:30
Total length:					20:13

== Credits and personnel ==
Credits adapted from the liner notes of the EP.

Musicians

- Aespa (Karina, Giselle, Winter, Ningning) – vocals (all tracks), background vocals (all tracks)
- Yoo Young-jin – Korean lyrics (tracks 1–2), composition (tracks 1–2), background vocals (tracks 1–2), arrangement (tracks 1–2)
- Kenzie – Korean lyrics (track 3), composition (track 3)
- Deez – Korean lyrics (track 4), background vocals (track 4)
- Saay – Korean lyrics (track 4), background vocals (track 4)
- Jo Yoon-kyung – Korean lyrics (track 5)
- Ellie Suh (153/Joombas) – Korean lyrics (track 6)
- Kill Dave – composition (tracks 1, 6), arrangement (tracks 1, 6)
- Pat Morrissey – composition (tracks 1, 6), arrangement (tracks 1, 6), keys & synths (track 6), piano & bongos (track 6), bass (track 6)
- Jess Corazza – composition (track 1)
- Kirsten Collins – composition (tracks 2, 3), background vocals (tracks 2, 3)
- Jia Lih – composition (track 2), arrangement (track 2)
- Hautboi Rich – composition (tracks 2, 3)
- Timothy 'Bos' Bullock – composition (track 3), arrangement (track 3)
- Brandon Green – composition (track 3), arrangement (track 3)
- Imlay – arrangement (tracks 3, 6), bass (track 6), sound fx (track 6)
- Coach & Sendo – composition (track 4), arrangement (track 4), keyboard (track 4)
- Sophie Curtis – composition (track 5)
- Val Del Prete (153/Joombas) – composition (track 5)
- Timothy Tan – composition (track 5), arrangement (track 5), drum programming (track 5), sampling (track 5)
- Hayley Kiyoko – composition (track 6)
- Paul Phamous – composition (track 6)
- Marcus Lomax – composition (track 6)
- Kwon Ae-jin – background vocals (track 5)
- Ciara Muscat – background vocals (track 5)
- David Dahlquist – keys & synths (track 6), piano & bongos (track 6), bass (track 6)

Technical

- Yoo Young-jin – directing (tracks 1–2), recording (tracks 1–2), digital editing (tracks 1–2), mixing engineer (tracks 1–2), mixing (tracks 1–2)
- Kenzie – directing (track 3)
- Deez – directing (track 4)
- Hwang Hyun – vocal directing (track 5), digital editing (track 5)
- Kim Yeon-seo – vocal directing (track 6)
- Noh Min-ji – recording (tracks 3–6), mixing engineer (tracks 3–4), digital editing (tracks 4, 6)
- Kang Sun-young – recording (track 5), digital editing (track 5)
- Kang Eun-ji – recording (track 6), digital editing (tracks 4, 6), mixing engineer (tracks 4–6)
- Coach & Sendo – computer programming (track 4)
- Lee Ji-hong – digital editing (track 3), mixing engineer (track 6)
- Jang Woo-young – digital editing (track 3)
- Kim Chul-soon – mixing (tracks 3–4)
- Jeong Eui-seok – mixing (track 5)
- Nam Koong-jin – mixing (track 6)
- Jeon Hoon – mastering
- Kwon Nam-woo – mastering
- Shin Soo-min – mastering assistant

== Charts ==
=== Weekly charts ===
Weekly chart performance for Savage
Chart (2021–2023)	Peak position
Belgian Albums (Ultratop Flanders)	193
Croatian International Albums (HDU)	17
Japanese Albums (Oricon)	7
Japanese Combined Albums (Oricon)	6
Japanese Hot Albums (Billboard Japan)	18
South Korean Albums (Gaon)	1
US Billboard 200	20
US Independent Albums (Billboard)	1
US Tastemaker Albums (Billboard)	4
US World Albums (Billboard)	1

=== Monthly charts ===
Monthly chart performance for Savage
Chart (October 2021)	Position
Japanese Albums (Oricon)	18
South Korean Albums (Gaon)	4

=== Year-end charts ===
2021 year-end chart performance for Savage
Chart	Position
South Korean Albums (Gaon)	23

2022 year-end chart performance for Savage
Chart	Peak position
South Korea Albums (Circle)	80

== Certifications and sales ==
Certifications for Savage
Region	Certification	Certified units/sales
South Korea (KMCA)	3× Platinum	757,202

== Release history ==
Release history for Savage
Region	Date	Format	Label
Various	October 5, 2021	Digital download; streaming	SM; Dreamus
South Korea	October 5, 2021	CD	SM; Dreamus

== See also ==
- List of Gaon Album Chart number ones of 2021
- List of K-pop albums on the Billboard charts
- List of certified albums in South Korea
