= Forever (Aespa song) =

2021 single by Aespa

Single by Aespa
- Language: Korean
- Released: February 5, 2021
- Recorded: 2020
- Studio: SM Studio Center, Seoul, South Korea
- Genre: R&B
- Length: 4:58
- Label: SM; Dreamus
- Songwriter: Yoo Young-jin

Aespa singles chronology
"Black Mamba" (2020)	"Forever" (2021)	"Next Level" (2021)

Music video
- "Forever" on YouTube

"Forever" (Korean: 약속; RR: Yaksok; lit. 'Promise') is a song recorded by South Korean girl group Aespa. Originally released as the group's second digital single on February 5, 2021, by SM Entertainment, it was later included on the group's second extended play Girls, released on July 8, 2022. A remake of the song of the same name by Yoo Young-jin as a part of SM's holiday album Winter Vacation in SMTown.com in 2000, "Forever" is a mid-tempo R&B ballad with an acoustic guitar sound and warm lyrics about promising forever to a loved one.

An accompanying music video for the song was published simultaneously with the single's release. The winter-inspired video follows Aespa in a winter wonderland in a snow globe with snow falling outside. The song debuted at number eleven on the US World Digital Song Sales chart, becoming their second entry overall and received generally favorable reviews from music critics.

== Background and release ==
"Forever"
"Forever" is a mid-tempo ballad that conveys a wintry romance story.

On January 29, 2021, SM Entertainment announced Aespa would be making a comeback with "Forever", which is a remake of a single by Yoo Young-jin, released for SM Entertainment's holiday album Winter Vacation in SMTown.com in 2000. On February 1, 2021, concept photos were released for Karina and Ningning. The following day, concept photos were released for Winter and Giselle. "Forever" was released for digital download and streaming as a digital single on February 5, 2021, by SM Entertainment.

== Composition ==
"Forever" was written and composed by Yoo Young-jin while production was handled by Lee Soo-man. The song has been described as a mid-tempo R&B ballad with an acoustic guitar sound and string instruments playing in the background. In terms of musical notation, the song is composed in the key of D-flat major, with a tempo of 184 beats per minute. At four minutes and fifty-eight seconds long, it is the longest song in Aespa's catalogue. Lyrically, it tells the story of a wintry romance and promising forever to a loved one. NME described it as "departure from both the image and sound" Aespa presented in their previous single "Black Mamba".

== Critical reception ==
Professional ratings
Review scores
Source	Rating
NME	3/5 stars

"Forever" received generally favorable reviews from music critics. In a three-star review of "Forever", NME's Ruby C said that the quartet added a "feminine touch" to their rendition. "The remake manages to do justice to the original, and may even be a little more believable, thanks to Aespa's sweet, girlish charms", she added. Writing for Hypebae, Ye-eun Kim described "Forever" as a "fresh, love-themed track" that shows a "completely different side of the virtual hybrid K-pop group". Irene Chou of The Brown Daily Herald called it "a soft ballad's late-winter feel" and praised the group's "impressive" vocals atop the "flawless execution of eye-catching choreography".

== Music video and promotion ==
A scene in the "Cozy Winter Cabin" version performance video, where Aespa is seen sitting in a cozy cabin as the snow falls outside.

In the lead-up to the release of "Forever", the group released photo and video teasers for the track, which served as a promotional tool for their return. An accompanying music video was uploaded to SM Entertainment's YouTube channel on February 5, 2021, and has accumulated more than 46 million views on the platform. The video was directed by the production company Sunnyvisual. Portrayed in a winter style, the visual depicts Aespa in a winter wonderland in a snow globe with snow falling outside. In one scene, the ae versions of the group are looking at their human versions from outside the snowglobe.

On February 6, 2021, Aespa released the "Cozy Winter Cabin" version performance video. In the video, the Aespa members are sitting in a cozy cabin as the snow falls outside. On February 8, the "Glitter Snowball" version was released. On February 10 the group released the "Romantic Street" version. During the group's attendance at the Second World Cultural Industry Forum (WCIF), Aespa performed the single along with "Black Mamba" and "Next Level" on a stage combing AR and XR technologies.

== Credits and personnel ==
Credits are adapted from Melon.

Studio

- SM Big Shot Studio – recording, digital editing, engineered for mix, mixing
- Studio-T – recording
- Sonic Korea – mastering

Personnel

- Aespa – vocals, background vocals
- Yoo Young-jin – lyrics, background vocals, recording, digital editing, composition, arrangement, music and sound supervisor, directing, mixing engineer, mixing
- Sam Lee – bass, guitar
- K Strings – strings
- Shim Sang-won –strings arrangement, conducting
- Oh Seung-geun – recording
- Oh Se-young – recording assistant
- Cheon Hoon – mastering
- Shin Soo-min – mastering assistant

== Charts ==
Weekly chart performance for "Forever"
Chart (2021)	Peak position
South Korea Download (Gaon)	28
US World Digital Song Sales (Billboard)	11

== Release history ==
Release dates and formats for "Forever"
Region	Date	Format	Label	Ref.
Various	February 5, 2021	Digital download, streaming	SM Entertainment; Dreamus	
