= Girls (Aespa song) =

- Remixes cover

Single by Aespa

from the EP Girls
- Language: Korean
- Released: July 8, 2022
- Genre: Dance-pop; electropop
- Length: 4:00
- Label: SM; Warner; Dreamus
- Composers: Ryan S. Jhun; Hanif Sabzevari (Hitmanic); Dennis "DeKo" Kordnejad (Hitmanic); Rodnae "Chikk" Bell; Pontus PJ Ljung; Yoo Young-jin
- Lyricist: Yoo Young-jin

Aespa singles chronology
"Life's Too Short" (2022)	"Girls" (2022)	"Beautiful Christmas" (2022)

Music video
- "Girls" on YouTube

"Girls" is a song recorded by South Korean girl group Aespa for their second extended play of the same name. It was released as the EP's lead single on July 8, 2022, by SM Entertainment.

== Background and release ==
On June 27, 2022, SM Entertainment announced Aespa would be releasing their second extended play titled Girls on July 8. On July 7, the music video teaser was released. The remix versions by Brllnt and Minit were released on October 21.

== Composition ==
"Girls" was written by Yoo Young-jin, composed and arranged by Ryan S. Jhun, Hanif Hitmanic Sabzevari, Dennis DeKo Kordnejad, Pontus PJ Ljung, and Yoo, with Rodnae "Chikk" Bell contributing to the composition. Musically, the song was described as a "dark", "brooding" dance, pop and electropop song with "heavy bass synth" and lyrics about "Aespa and ae-Aespa having a full-fledged battle with Black Mamba [the antagonist]". The song's "glitchy, electronic-heavy production" softens during the bridge, before "sliding into a nutty techno breakdown" at the end.

== Commercial performance ==
"Girls" debuted at number 72 on South Korea's Circle Digital Chart in the chart issue dated July 3–9, 2022. It ascended to number eight in the chart issue dated July 31 – August 6, 2022. On the Billboard South Korea Songs, the song debuted at number one in the chart issue dated July 3, 2022.

In Japan, "Girls" debuted at number 94 on the Billboard Japan Hot 100 in the chart issue dated July 13, 2022, ascending to number 30 in the following week. On the Oricon Combined Singles Chart, the song debuted at number 35 in the chart issue dated July 25, 2022. In New Zealand, the song debuted at number 23 on the RMNZ Hot Singles in the chart issue dated July 18, 2022. In Australia, the song debuted at number 18 on the ARIA Top 20 Hitseekers Singles Chart in the chart issue dated July 18, 2022.

In Singapore, "Girls" debuted at number 13 on the RIAS Top Streaming Chart, and number five on the RIAS Top Regional Chart in the chart issue dated July 8–14, 2022. It also debuted at number 14 on the Billboard Singapore Songs in the chart issue dated July 23, 2022. In Malaysia, the song debuted at number 11 on the Billboard Malaysia Songs in the chart issue dated July 23, 2022. In Indonesia, the song debuted at number 13 on the Billboard Indonesia Songs in the chart issue dated July 23, 2022. In Hong Kong, the song debuted at number 15 on the Billboard Hong Kong Songs in the chart issue dated July 23, 2022. In Taiwan, the song debuted at number eight on the Billboard Taiwan Songs in the chart issue dated July 23, 2022. In Vietnam, the song debuted at number eight on the Billboard Vietnam Hot 100 in the chart issue dated July 21, 2022.

In the United States, "Girls" debuted at number six on the Billboard World Digital Song Sales in the chart issue dated July 23, 2022. Globally, the song debuted at number 42 on the Billboard Global 200, and number 25 on the Billboard Global Excl. U.S in the chart issue dated July 23, 2022.

== Promotion ==
Following the release of Girls, Aespa performed "Girls" alongside "Black Mamba" on Good Morning America's Summer Concert series on July 8. The group held a live event called "Aespa Girls Comeback Live" on July 11 on YouTube and TikTok to introduce the extended play and its songs, including "Girls", and to communicate with their fans. They subsequently performed on two music programs in the first week of promotion in South Korea: Mnet's M Countdown on July 14, and MBC's Show! Music Core on July 16. On the second week, they performed on KBS's Music Bank on July 22.

== Accolades ==
"Girls" received two music program awards in South Korea. It won on the July 20 episode of Show Champion and July 21, 2022, episode of M Countdown. "Girls" was named amongst the best songs of 2022 by Rolling Stone (65th) and Rhian Daly from The Forty Five (36th), as well as one of the best K-pop songs of the year by Dazed (31st).

"Girls" won Best Global Digital Music of July 2022 at the 12th Circle Chart Music Awards, beating Itzy's "Sneakers" and J-Hope's "More". At the 2023 MTV Video Music Awards, it was nominated for Best K-Pop.

== Track listing ==
Digital download / streaming – original

1. "Girls" – 4:00

Digital download / streaming – remixes

1. "Girls" (BRLLNT remix) – 2:55
2. "Girls" (Minit remix) – 3:42
3. "Girls" – 4:00

== Credits and personnel ==
Credits adapted from the liner notes of Girls.

Studio

- SM Booming System – recording, digital editing, engineered for mix, mixing
- Sonic Korea – mastering

Personnel

- Aespa – vocals, background vocals
- Yoo Young-jin – lyrics, composition, arrangement, vocal directing, background vocals, recording, digital editing, engineered for mix, mixing, music and sound supervisor
- Ryan S. Jhun – composition, arrangement
- Hanif "Hitmanic" Sabzevari – composition, arrangement
- Dennis "DeKo" Kordnejad – composition, arrangement
- Rodnae "Chikk" Bell – composition
- Pontus "PJ" Ljung – composition, arrangement
- Jeon Hoon – mastering
- Shin Soo-min – mastering assistant

== Charts ==
=== Weekly charts ===
Weekly chart performance for "Girls"
Chart (2022)	Peak position
Australian Hitseekers (ARIA)	18
Global 200 (Billboard)	42
Hong Kong (Billboard)	15
Indonesia (Billboard)	13
Japan (Japan Hot 100)	30
Japan Combined Singles (Oricon)	35
Malaysia (Billboard)	11
New Zealand Hot Singles (RMNZ)	23
Singapore (Billboard)	14
Singapore (RIAS)	13
South Korea (Circle)	8
Taiwan (Billboard)	8
UK Video Streaming (OCC)	52
US World Digital Song Sales (Billboard)	6
Vietnam (Vietnam Hot 100)	8

=== Monthly charts ===
Monthly chart performance for "Girls"
Chart (2022)	Position
South Korea (Circle)	12

=== Year-end chart ===
Year-end chart performance for "Girls"
Chart (2022)	Peak position
South Korea (Circle)	88

== Certifications ==
Certifications for "Girls"
Region	Certification	Certified units/sales
Streaming
Japan (RIAJ)	Gold	50,000,000^{†}
^{†} Streaming-only figures based on certification alone.

== Release history ==
Release history for "Girls"
Region	Date	Format(s)	Version	Label(s)
Various	July 8, 2022	Digital download; streaming	Original	SM; Warner; Dreamus
Various	October 21, 2022	Digital download; streaming	Remixes	SM; ScreaM; Warner; Dreamus

== See also ==
- List of M Countdown Chart winners (2022)
- List of Show Champion Chart winners (2022)
