= Next Level (Aespa song) =

Single by Aespa
- Language: Korean; English
- Released: May 17, 2021
- Studio: SM BoomingSystem (Seoul)
- Genre: Hip hop; dance-pop; EDM
- Length: 3:41
- Label: SM; Dreamus
- Composers: Yoo Young-jin; Adam McInnis; Mario Marchetti; Sophie Curtis
- Lyricist: Yoo Young-jin

Aespa singles chronology
| "Forever" (2021) | "Next Level" (2021) | "Savage" (2021) |

Remixes cover
- iScreaM Vol. 10 : Next Level Remixes cover

Music video
- "Next Level" on YouTube

"Next Level" is a song recorded by South Korean girl group Aespa, which remakes A$ton Wyld's song of the same name. It was released digitally on May 17, 2021, by SM Entertainment. Composed by Yoo Young-jin, Adam McInnis, Mario Marchetti, and Sophie Curtis, the track is described as a dance and hip hop song with an upbeat new jack swing bridge. The song is a continuation of the group's story from their debut single "Black Mamba", telling their journey into the fictional Kwangya universe to search for the aforementioned "evil".

Upon its release, "Next Level" received positive reviews from critics for its hip-hop production and the members' performance. The song is the group's first top-five hit in their native country, their second top-five entry on the Billboard World Digital Song Sales chart, and their second entry on the Billboard Global 200, making Aespa only the third South Korean girl group to appear on the global chart more than once. It eventually achieved several accolades by the end of 2021 and 2022, most notably both the Best K-Pop Song and Song of the Year at the 19th Korean Music Awards, making aespa the first SM idol girl group to win more than once within the awards, and the second girl group in the award's history to win the latter category, following fellow labelmate Girls' Generation's victory in 2010.

== Background and release ==
On May 4, 2021, South Korean news outlet Ilgan Sports reported that the Aespa was in the final stages of preparation for their much-anticipated comeback. The report was subsequently confirmed by SM Entertainment, adding that other details of the comeback would be disclosed at a later date. On May 5, the group released a cryptic teaser to the single on social media and confirmed the comeback date to be May 17. From May 7 to 10, teaser images were released for each individual group member (in order: Karina, Winter, Giselle, Ningning). The song was released on May 17.

== Composition ==
"Next Level"
"Next Level" is a hip hop dance song that contains the group's journey in finding the evil called Black Mamba.

"Next Level" was composed by Yoo Young-jin, Adam McInnis, Mario Marchetti, and Sophie Curtis. In addition, SM Entertainment's founder and producer Lee Soo-man helped Aespa add a "distinctive color to the song". The song remakes A$ton Wyld's song of the same name, which featured on the soundtrack of Fast & Furious Presents: Hobbs & Shaw. In an interview with ReacttotheK, McInnis revealed that SM contacted him regarding a possible remake of the song. He stated that most of the changes done in it are done by SM and only the company would send different versions of the song to him.

Musically, "Next Level" is a dance and hip hop song with a "groovy" rap and an "energetic" bass riff, showcasing Aespa's "powerful voice and variety". Yeom Dong-gyo of IZM noted the "original hip-hop sound" of the song. Mariel Abanes of NME described it as a "fierce dance-pop song in a futuristic world". Divyansha Dongre of Rolling Stone India called the song an "energetic EDM anthem", while noting the "switch in composition and arrangement to match the group’s unique style". Moreover, Dongre recognized the "rhythm switches mid-track with an upbeat-jazz inspired composition". Karina mentioned that it is a "groovy and energetic with a dynamic musical arrangement" song, while mentioning that they have tried bringing more power to the single through their voices. It is composed in the key of B minor, with a tempo of 109 beats per minute. The lyrics detail the group's journey into a fictional universe, Kwangya, in search of an evil being called the Black Mamba. The group revealed that the song is a sequel to "Black Mamba" (2020), during which the connection to their ae was cut off.

== Critical reception ==
Following its release, "Next Level" was met with positive reviews from music critics. Hakyung Kate Lee of ABC News recognized the song's "astonishing popularity", further explaining that the song was "powered by a unique concept of Aespa's identity and story". Hugh McIntyre of Forbes noted the tune for bringing Aespa to the upper half of the ranking chart for the first time, further adding that "it helps them join a very exclusive club of some of the most successful girl groups from South Korea". In an individual song review, writer Yeom Dong-gyo of IZM noted the track for Karina and Giselle's "sophisticated rap", further praising Winter's high-pitched part that "energizes the bridge, smoothly weaving the changing composition of the song" and rated it three stars out of five. Third of Idology commented on the "ridiculous composition" of the song, but called it as "quite attractive". Moreover, Third described composition of the song as an intention to function as a kind of an original soundtrack rather than an independent song.

"Next Level" on select critic rankings
| Critic/Publication | List | Rank | Ref. |
|---|---|---|---|
| Billboard | 25 Best K-Pop Songs of 2021 | 2 | |
| Idology | Top 10 Songs of the Year | Placed | |
| Insider | The best K-pop songs of 2021 | 3 | |
| IZM | Top K-pop Songs of the Year | Placed | |
| Music Y | Top 10 Songs of 2021 | 5 | |
| NME | The 25 best K-pop songs of 2021 | 2 | |
| NME | The 50 best songs of 2021 | 45 | |
| Rolling Stone | 100 Greatest Songs in the History of Korean Pop Music | 89 | |
| SCMP | The 20 best K-pop songs of 2021 | 1 | |
| Spotify | 10 Best K-Pop Songs of 2021 | 1 | |
| Teen Vogue | The 54 Best K-Pop Songs of 2021 | Placed | |
| Tonplein | Top 50 K-pop Songs of 2021 (Yang So-ha) | 1 | |

== Accolades ==
Awards and nominations for "Next Level"
| Ceremony | Year | Award | Result | Ref. |
|---|---|---|---|---|
| Gaon Chart Music Awards | 2022 | Artist of the Year (Digital Music) – May | Nominated | |
| Golden Disc Awards | 2022 | Digital Song Bonsang | Won | |
| Joox Thailand Music Awards | 2022 | Korean Song of the Year | Nominated | |
| Korean Music Awards | 2022 | Best K-pop Song | Won | |
| Korean Music Awards | 2022 | Song of the Year | Won | |
| Melon Music Awards | 2021 | Song of the Year | Nominated | |
| Mnet Asian Music Awards | 2021 | Best Dance Performance – Female Group | Won | |
| Mnet Asian Music Awards | 2021 | TikTok Song of the Year | Nominated | |

== Commercial performance ==
"Next Level" debuted at number nine on South Korea's Gaon Digital Chart with chart issue dated May 16–22, 2021, making it Aespa's first top ten single on the chart. The song then ascended to number two in its fifth week, thus earning the group their first top-two entry, and their highest peak to date. The single entered the Billboard K-Pop 100 at number 33 on the chart issue dated May 29, 2021. It reached number five in the following week and peaked at number three with chart issue dated June 12, 2021. In Japan, "Next Level" debuted at number 77 on the Billboard Japan Hot 100 chart issue dated May 26, 2021. In Singapore, the single debuted at 25 on the Streaming Chart, later peaking at number twenty-three. It also debuted at 12 on the Regional Chart, and peaked at number six.

In the United States, "Next Level" debuted and peaked at number three on the Billboard World Digital Song Sales. The single went on to debut at number 97 on the Billboard Global 200 chart issue dated May 29, 2021, up by 86 steps from their debut song "Black Mamba" and making Aespa the third South Korean girl group to reach the chart more than once after Blackpink and Itzy. The song peaked at number 65 in the following week. The song also debuted at number 54 on the Billboard Global Excl. US, and peaked at number 34 in the following week.

== Music video ==
=== Background ===
A scene in the music video, where Aespa is seen in a futuristic VFX with colorful computer graphics

On May 15, 2021, a 28-second video teaser for "Next Level" was uploaded on the official SM Town channel, with the official video being released two days later. The visual was released on SM Entertainment's official YouTube channel on May 17, to coincide with the digital release of the song. The accompanying music video for the track was directed by Paranoid Paradigm. Aespa revealed that SM Entertainment founder Lee Soo-man directed their performance video from choreography, composition, stage movement, camera work, outfits, and gestures.

=== Synopsis and reception ===
The music video tells a story of venturing out to wilderness to find "Black Mamba", the antagonist that's threatening and interfering with "Synk" which is the connection between themselves and the "ae". Following the music video's release, writer Moon Wan-sik of StarNews noted the "colorful CGs and intense performances". Patti Sunio of South China Morning Post described the music video for being a "visual treat that not only showcases Aespa's bold fashion styles" further praising the group for their "versatile vocals and power choreography". Divyansha Dongre of Rolling Stone India noted its "fresh and vibrant with colorful cinematography blended with futuristic VFX" music video that is elevating the appeal of the track. On June 19, 2021, the music video for the track reached 100 million views on YouTube in 32 days and eight hours, which is the shortest time in which an Aespa video had accrued that many views. The music video ranked at number six on YouTube Korea's Most Popular Music Video of 2021.

== Promotion and live performances ==
On May 20, 2021, Aespa unveiled their first performance stage of "Next Level" at the group's official YouTube channel. For the performance, choreography by Kiel Tutin, Jojo Gomez, Rozalin, Lee Ba-da, Jeon Yeo-jin, Redlic, and Rian was commissioned. On May 21, the group released a choreography confirmation video of the song on which Lee Soo-man personally confirmed the choreography movement and camera walking of the visual. The group subsequently uploaded their second and third performance stages at their official channel on May 25 and 27. On June 20, the group released a company version dance practice for the song. To commemorate the launch of Kakao Games' new battle royale game, Eternal Return, it released a special celebratory performance video of the song on July 22. It also featured a stage with an introduction to the worldview and the atmosphere of the game, with the song being considered the original soundtrack of the game.

On May 28, 2021, Aespa had their first music show performance on Music Bank. As part of "Next Level's" promotions, the song was also performed live during their promotion week on Inkigayo, M Countdown, and Show! Music Core. On June 25, the group appeared on the Music Bank First Half Special where they performed the single. During the group's attendance at the Second World Cultural Industry Forum (WCIF), the group performed the single along with "Black Mamba" and "Forever" on a stage combing AR and XR technologies. On August 12, the group performed the song as well as "Black Mamba" at the Korea on Stage - Namwon Gwanghallu, hosted by the Cultural Heritage Administration and organized by the Korea Foundation and the Korean Broadcasting System (KBS). On September 25, the single along with "Black Mamba" was performed at the 2021 INK Incheon K-pop Concert. As part of the group's collaboration with League of Legends: Wild Rift, they performed the song at the opening stage of Wild Rift SEA Championship Grand Finals presented by ESL Mobile Challenge Finals on October 3. The group performed the song at the 2021 Changwon K-pop World Festival with the performance held on the outdoor stages of Changwon and South Korea's landmarks. For the 2021 UN Day Celebration New York Culture Performance, the group performed the song and an orchestra version of "Black Mamba". On November 14, the group performed the song along with "Black Mamba" and "Savage" for the 2021 World K-pop Concert held by the Ministry of Culture, Sports and Tourism and the Korea Foundation for International Cultural Exchange at the Korea International Exhibition Center (KINTEX).

== Remixes ==
On September 10, 2021, it was announced that remix versions of "Next Level" will be released as a single titled iScreaM Vol.10 : Next Level Remixes. It featured three remix versions of the song from French DJ Habstrakt, ScreaM Records producer IMLAY, and beat maker producer Lionclad. On September 13, a 33-second music video teaser for "Next Level (Habstrakt Remix)" was uploaded on the official SM Town channel. The single album was released on September 14, along with the music video and a visualizer video for "Next Level (IMLAY Remix)". A live video for "Next Level (Lionclad Remix)" was released on ScreaM Record's official YouTube channel on September 20. "Next Level (Habstrakt Remix)" debuted at number 183 on South Korea's Gaon Digital Chart with chart issue dated September 12–18.

== Track listing ==
Digital download / streaming – original version

1. "Next Level" – 3:41

Digital download / streaming – remixes

1. "Next Level" (Habstrakt remix) – 3:20
2. "Next Level" (IMLAY remix) – 3:45
3. "Next Level" (Lionclad remix) – 3:45

== Credits and personnel ==
Credits adapted from Melon.

Studio

- SM BoomingSystem – recording, digital editing, engineered for mix, mixing
- Sonic Korea – mastering

Personnel

- Aespa – vocals, background vocals
- Yoo Young-jin – lyrics, composition, arrangement, music and sound supervising, vocal directing, background vocals, recording, digital editing, engineered for mix, mixing
- Adam McInnis – composition, arrangement
- Mario Marchetti – composition, arrangement
- Sophie Curtis – composition
- Kriz – background vocals
- Jeon Hoon – mastering
- Shin Soo-min – mastering assistant

== Charts ==
=== Weekly charts ===
Weekly chart performance for "Next Level"
| Chart (2021–2022) | Peak position |
|---|---|
| Global 200 (Billboard) | 65 |
| Hong Kong (HKRIA) | 15 |
| Japan (Japan Hot 100) | 77 |
| Singapore (RIAS) | 23 |
| South Korea (Gaon) | 2 |
| South Korea (K-pop Hot 100) | 2 |
| South Korea (Billboard) | 11 |
| US World Digital Songs (Billboard) | 3 |

=== Monthly charts ===
"Next Level" monthly chart performance
| Chart (2021) | Peak Position |
|---|---|
| South Korea (Gaon) | 2 |
| South Korea (K-pop Hot 100) | 2 |

=== Year-end charts ===
Year-end chart performance for "Next Level"
| Chart (2021) | Position |
|---|---|
| South Korea (Gaon) | 5 |
| Chart (2022) | Position |
| South Korea (Circle) | 25 |
| Chart (2023) | Position |
| South Korea (Circle) | 143 |
| Chart (2024) | Position |
| South Korea (Circle) | 169 |

== Certifications ==
Streaming certifications for "Next Level"
| Region | Certification | Certified units/sales |
|---|---|---|
| Japan (RIAJ) | Platinum | 100,000,000^{†} |
| South Korea (KMCA) | 2× Platinum | 200,000,000^{†} |
^{†} Streaming-only figures based on certification alone.

== Release history ==
Release dates and formats for "Next Level"
| Region | Date | Format(s) | Version | Label(s) | Ref. |
|---|---|---|---|---|---|
| Various | May 17, 2021 | Digital download; streaming | Original | SM; Dreamus | |
| Various | September 14, 2021 | Digital download; streaming | Remixes | SM; Dreamus; ScreaM | |
