= Girls (Aespa EP) =

- Digital and "Kwangya" version cover

EP by Aespa
- Released: July 8, 2022
- Genre: Pop
- Length: 19:28
- Language: Korean; English
- Label: SM; Warner; Dreamus
- Producer: Yoo Young-jin; Ryan S. Jhun; G'harah "PK" Degeddingseze; Patricia Battani; Lisa "Lixa" Hickox; Sam Klempner; Josh Cumbee

Aespa chronology
Savage (2021)	Girls (2022)	My World (2023)

Singles from Girls
- 1. "Life's Too Short (English version)" Released: June 24, 2022; 2. "Girls" Released: July 8, 2022

Girls is the second extended play by South Korean girl group Aespa. The EP was released through SM Entertainment and Warner Records on July 8, 2022. It consists of six tracks and was preceded by the promotional single "Illusion", and two official singles: "Life's Too Short" (English version) and "Girls". The digital version also adds the group's previously released singles "Black Mamba", "Forever", and "Dreams Come True".

Girls was a commercial success and debuted at number one on South Korea's Circle Album Chart with 1,426,487 copies sold in the first week of release, marking Aespa's second number-one album on the chart and their highest-selling album to date. In September, the EP was certified Million by the Korea Music Content Association (KMCA) for surpassing 1,000,000 copies sold. Selling over 1,610,000 units during its pre-order period, the EP became Aespa's best-selling album to date; surpassing a record previously held by Savage (2021). It also debuted at number three on the Billboard 200 with 56,000 album-equivalent units, becoming the group's second and highest entry on the chart.

== Background and release ==
On June 1, 2022, a teaser marking the release of Aespa's upcoming extended play (EP) was posted on the group's various social media accounts. The teaser was a short video with a "panorama of a digital mountain range" and a "burst of synth-heavy music". It was then announced that the group would release their second EP, titled Girls, on July 8. It was the group's first EP since Savage in October 2021, and their first release since their 2021 remake of the song "Dreams Come True", originally by S.E.S. Girls was released in South Korea and the United States by both SM Entertainment and Warner Records, with whom SM Entertainment signed a global partnership for music content distribution and marketing promotions earlier in the year. In an interview with Billboard, Giselle reiterated that Aespa would travel to the US to promote the EP. Digital and physical pre-sales for the EP opened on June 2.

Aespa was selected as the June artist for Apple Music's Up Next, a global campaign designating the most anticipated artists of the month amongst new artists worldwide. Alongside making pre-orders for Girls available, the group also released a feature short film for Up Next. They released "Illusion" as a pre-release song for the promotions on various music streaming services on June 1, 2022. On June 24, the English version of "Life's Too Short" was released as the EP's second pre-release single. The group debuted the song live at the Coachella Valley Music and Arts Festival.

In an interview with the Audacy, Inc., it was revealed that the release of Girls had been postponed to July 8 from its original date to "make way for more refinements to be made to its songs". On June 24, 2022, in an exclusive interview with Korean media StarNews, the group mentioned that they were wondering if "Lingo" or "Illusion" should be released as a pre-release single. Eventually the members felt the latter fits the album's concept better and has "Aespa's color".

== Composition ==
The standard edition of the EP is about nineteen minutes long, consisting of 6 tracks, while the digital adds the group's previously released singles "Black Mamba", "Forever", and "Dreams Come True". Girls features various genres such as pop. Lyrically, the album discusses themes of love, self-confidence, friendship, alliance, and more. Rolling Stone's Kristine Kwak noted that while "Girls" and "Illusion" are closer to the group's futuristic sound, the rest of the EP is "more light-hearted side of the girls with themes of not taking life too seriously".

=== Songs ===
The lead single "Girls" was described as a "dark", "brooding" dance, pop and electropop song with "heavy bass synth" and lyrics about "Aespa and ae-Aespa having a full-fledged battle with Black Mamba [the antagonist]". It's "glitchy, electronic-heavy production" softens during the bridge, before "sliding into a nutty techno breakdown" at the end. The second track "Illusion" was described as an electronic "high-energy" hip hop, synth-pop, dance and EDM-trap song with "punchy 808 bass and kicking sound that catches the ears". It consists of elements indicative of hyperpop, including an "eccentric percussion to hi-hats and electric, woodblock-like clicks". Lyrically, the song was described as having "Aespa's own color expressed" such as "comparing the desire to seduce and devour one's opponent to goblin fire".

The third track "Lingo" was described as a country dance and dance-pop song with a "reverse charm that combines bass and energetic drums", "Wild West-worthy" harmonica and cowbells. The track celebrates "the special and unique bonds between close friends", expressed through the metaphor of a shared lingo. The fourth track "Life's Too Short" is a medium-tempo pop, soft pop and bubblegum pop song with a "catchy, electric guitar riff" and "bright, breezy and hopeful vocals". The song's lyrics feature a "positive aspiration to enjoy a once-in-a-lifetime life as desired without regrets". The last track "ICU" is a "gentle" and "soothing" acoustic ballad that has a "harmonious" folk guitar and "delicate" strings. It delivers a message that emphasizes the importance of "making sure to take a step back and rest in the midst of busy times".

== Critical reception ==
Professional ratings
Aggregate scores
Source	Rating
Metacritic	78/100
Review scores
Source	Rating
AllMusic	4/5 stars
Beats Per Minute	77/100
Clash	7/10
NME	3/5 stars
Rolling Stone	4/5 stars
SoundX	6.9/10 stars

Upon its release, Girls received positive responses from music critics, who praised Aespa's energy, consistency, and diversity. On Metacritic, which assigns a normalized score out of 100 to ratings from publications, the album received a mean score of 78 based on 5 reviews, indicating "generally favorable reviews".

In a four-star out of five review for Rolling Stone, Kristine Kwak said that it "includes everything one could want from an Aespa record" from heavy synth beats and strong "piercing" vocals to visuals that "don't give you a second to blink". Writing for AllMusic, Neil Z. Yeung gave Girls a 4 out of 5 rating, citing it as a "edgier and more aggressive than most of their contemporaries". Yeung added that the EP is "brisk nine tracks, there's enough variety and energy to make it an engaging and irresistible listen". For Beats Per Minute, Chase McMullen rated the album 77 out of 100, applauding that album "does exactly what it's meant to, in exactly the time that it takes to do so". Rhian Daly of NME gave the album a three-star rating, pointing out: "If 'Girls' is a bid for superstar status, though, it sometimes plays it too safe." Clash's critic Robin Murray wrote that the album "demonstrates an advancement of Aespa as artists" and "it has solidified the group's creative intentions whilst also illustrating their ability at owning other concepts".

== Commercial performance ==
On June 9, 2022, the pre-orders for Girls surpassed one million copies, a week after the announcement, exceeding Aespa's previous career high of 401,000 pre-orders for Savage. Pre-orders exceeded 1,610,000 units one day prior to its release, the highest figure for a girl group album in K-pop. The album debuted at number one on the Circle Album Chart, selling 1,426,487 copies for the 28th week of 2022. In the first week of release, it was reported that Girls sold more than one million copies on the Hanteo Chart, exceeding the mark set by Blackpink's The Album in October 2020. Girls has since been certified million by the Korea Music Content Association (KMCA). In Japan, it debuted at number 3 on Oricon's Digital Albums Chart and at number 2 on Billboard Japan's Hot Albums chart.

Girls debuted at number three on the US Billboard 200 with 56,000 album-equivalent units, including 53,000 pure album sales, making it the highest-selling album of the week. It was Aespa's first US top-10 album. In Europe, the album appeared on Belgium's Ultratop Flanders 200 Albums, Finland's Top 50 Albums, Hungary's Top 40 Albums, Sweden's Top 20 Physical Albums, Poland's Top 50 Albums, France's Top 100 Albums, Croatia's International Albums, and the United Kingdom's Album Downloads Chart.

== Track listing ==
Girls track listing
No.	Title	Lyrics	Music	Arrangement	Length
1.	"Girls"	Yoo Young-jin	Ryan S. Jhun; Hanif Sabzevari (Hitmanic); Dennis "DeKo" Kordnejad (Hitmanic); Rodnae "Chikk" Bell; Pontus PJ Ljung; Yoo Young-jin	Ryan S. Jhun; Hitmanic; Pontus "PJ" Ljung; Yoo Young-jin	4:00
2.	"Illusion" (Korean: 도깨비불; RR: Dokkaebibul; lit. 'Will-o'-the-wisp')	Lee Thor (Lalala Studio)	G'harah "PK" Degeddingseze; Patricia Battani	G'harah "PK" Degeddingseze; Patricia Battani; Steve Octave	3:15
3.	"Lingo"	Song Jae-ri (Joombas)	Alma Goodman; Gabriella Grombacher; Christina Galligan; Lisa "Lixa" Hickox	Lixa	2:36
4.	"Life's Too Short"	Jang Jeong-won	Becky Hill; Sam Klempner; Uzoechi Emenike	Sam Klempner	2:58
5.	"ICU" (쉬어가도 돼; Swieogado dwae; 'You Can Rest')	Bae Hye-jin (Joombas)	Ryan S. Jhun; Josh Cumbee; Nisha Asnani	Ryan S. Jhun; Josh Cumbee	3:41
6.	"Life's Too Short" (English version)	Becky Hill; Sam Klempner; Uzoechi Emenike	Becky Hill; Sam Klempner; Uzoechi Emenike	Sam Klempner	2:58
Total length:					19:28

Girls – Digital edition
No.	Title	Lyrics	Music	Arrangement	Length
7.	"Black Mamba"	Yoo Young-jin	Omega; Ella Isaacson; Gabriela Geneva (Niiva); Jordan Reyes; Shaun Lopez; Scott Chesak; Yoo Young-jin	Omega; Jordan Reyes; Shaun Lopez; Scott Chesak; Yoo Young-jin	2:54
8.	"Forever" (약속; Yaksok; 'Promise')	Yoo Young-jin	Yoo Young-jin	Yoo Young-jin	4:58
9.	"Dreams Come True"	Bada; Yoo Young-jin; BoA	Yoo Young-jin; BoA; Risto Armas Asikainen	Yoo Young-jin; BoA; Shaun Kim; BXN	3:24
Total length:					30:44

Girls — Apple Music Up Next Film Edition
No.	Title	Length
10.	"Up Next: Aespa"	4:09
Total length:		34:53

== Credits and personnel ==
Credits adapted from physical album's liner notes (not include the digital edition).

Studio

- SM Booming System – recording, mixing, engineered for mix, digital editing (track 1)
- SM Yellow Tail Studio – recording (track 3, 5), digital editing (track 3, 5)
- SM Blue Ocean Studio – mixing (track 4, 6)
- SM Blue Cup Studio – mixing (track 2–3)
- SM Lvyin Studio – digital editing (track 4, 6)
- SM Ssam Studio – recording (track 4, 6)
- SM Starlight Studio – recording (track 2–3), digital editing (track 2)
- SM Concert Hall Studio – mixing (track 5)
- Sonic Korea – mastering (track 1)
- 821 Sound – mastering (track 2–6)

Personnel

- SM Entertainment – executive producer
- Lee Soo-man – producer
- Lee Sung-soo – production director, executive supervisor
- Tak Young-jun – executive supervisor
- Aespa – vocals, background vocals (all tracks)
- Yoo Young-jin – producer (track 1), lyrics, composition, arrangement, recording, mixing, engineered for mix, vocal directing, background vocals, digital editing (track 1), music and sound supervisor (all tracks)
- Maxx Song – vocal directing, digital editing (track 2)
- Kenzie – vocal directing (track 3)
- minGtion – vocal directing (track 4, 6)
- Oiaisle – background vocals (track 4, 6)
- Emily Yeonseo Kim – vocal directing, background vocals (track 5)
- Lee Thor – lyrics (track 2)
- Song Jae-ri (Joombas) – lyrics (track 3)
- Jang Jeong-won – Korean lyrics (track 4)
- Bae Hye-jin (Joombas) – lyrics (track 5)
- Becky Hill – English lyrics (track 6), composition (track 4, 6)
- Uzoechi Emenike – English lyrics (track 6), composition (track 4, 6)
- Sam Klempner – producer (track 4, 6), English lyrics (track 6), composition, arrangement (track 4, 6)
- Hanif Sabzevari (Hitmanic) – composition, arrangement (track 1)
- Dennis "DeKo" Kordnejad (Hitmanic) – composition, arrangement (track 1)
- Rodnae "Chikk" Bell – composition (track 1)
- Pontus PJ Ljung – composition, arrangement (track 1)
- Ryan S. Jhun – producer (track 1, 5), composition, arrangement (track 1, 5)
- G'harah "PK" Degeddingseze – producer (track 2), composition, arrangement (track 2)
- Patricia Battani – producer (track 2), composition, arrangement (track 2)
- Steve Octave – arrangement (track 2)
- Alma Goodman – composition, background vocals (track 3)
- Gabriella "GiGi" Grombacher – composition, background vocals (track 3)
- Christina Galligan – composition, background vocals (track 3)
- Lisa "Lixa" Hickox – producer (track 3), composition, arrangement (track 3)
- Nisha Asnani – composition (track 5)
- Josh Cumbee – producer (track 5), composition, arrangement, guitar (track 5)
- Jay Denton – banjo, mandolin, guitar (track 5)
- Noh Min-ji – recording (track 3, 5), digital editing (track 3, 5)
- Kang Eun-ji – recording (track 4, 6)
- Kim Cheol-sun – mixing (track 4, 6)
- Jung Eui-seok – mixing (track 2–3)
- Lee Ji-hong – digital editing (track 4, 6)
- Jung Yu-ra – recording (track 2–3), digital editing (track 2)
- Nam Koong-jin – mixing (track 5)
- Jeon Hoon – mastering (track 1)
- Shin Soo-min – mastering assistant (track 1)
- Kwon Nam-woo – mastering (track 2–6)

== Charts ==
=== Weekly charts ===
Weekly chart performance
Chart (2022)	Peak position
Australian Albums (ARIA)	55
Belgian Albums (Ultratop Flanders)	89
Croatian International Albums (HDU)	2
Finnish Physical Albums (Suomen virallinen lista)	6
French Albums (SNEP)	79
Hungarian Albums (MAHASZ)	4
Japanese Albums (Oricon)	3
Japanese Combined Albums (Oricon)	3
Japanese Hot Albums (Billboard Japan)	2
Polish Albums (ZPAV)	40
South Korean Albums (Circle)	1
Swedish Physical Albums (Sverigetopplistan)	7
UK Album Downloads (OCC)	67
US Billboard 200	3
US World Albums (Billboard)	1

=== Monthly charts ===
Monthly chart performance
Chart (2022)	Peak position
Japanese Albums (Oricon)	9
South Korean Albums (Circle)	1

=== Year-end charts ===
Year-end chart performance
Chart (2022)	Position
Japanese Albums (Oricon)	53
Japanese Hot Albums (Billboard Japan)	51
South Korean Albums (Circle)	8
US Top Album Sales (Billboard)	65

== Certifications and sales ==
Certifications and sales
Region	Certification	Certified units/sales
Japan	—	65,555
South Korea (KMCA)	Million	1,803,050

== Release history ==
Release history
Region	Date	Format(s)	Label(s)	Ref.
Various	July 8, 2022	CD; digital download; streaming	SM; Warner	
