= Black Mamba (song) =

2020 single by Aespa

Single by Aespa
- Language: Korean; English
- Released: November 17, 2020
- Recorded: 2020
- Studio: SM Studio Center, Seoul, South Korea
- Genre: Electropop; dance-pop; pop; EDM trap
- Length: 2:54
- Label: SM; Dreamus
- Composers: Omega; Ella Isaacson; Gabriela Geneva (NIIVA); Jordan Reyes; Shaun Lopez; Scott Chesak; Yoo Young-jin
- Lyricist: Yoo Young-jin
- Producer: Lee Soo-man

Aespa singles chronology
"Black Mamba" (2020)	"Forever" (2021)

Music video
- "Black Mamba" on YouTube

"Black Mamba" is the debut single by South Korean girl group Aespa. Originally released as a standalone single on November 17, 2020, by SM Entertainment, the song was later included on the group's second extended play Girls, which was released on July 8, 2022. The song was written and composed by Yoo Young-jin, while also composed by Omega, Ella Isaacson, Gabriela Geneva (NIIVA), Jordan Reyes, Shaun Lopez, and Scott Chesak. Musically, "Black Mamba" was described as a pop, electropop and dance-pop track with a signature synth and EDM sound and bass that is paired with an addictive hook. The lyrics are about a being called "Black Mamba" that not only interferes with the members' and avatar's connection but also threatens their world and as such is abhorred by the members.

An accompanying music video for the song was uploaded onto SM Entertainment's YouTube channel simultaneously with the single's release. The song's music video achieved the highest number of views for a K-pop group's debut video, with 21.4 million views in 24 hours. Commercially, the single reached the charts in five countries, peaking at number 49 in South Korea and number 5 on the US Billboard World Digital Songs. Aespa promoted the song with televised live performances on various South Korean music programs including Show! Music Core, Music Bank and Inkigayo.

== Background and release ==
On October 26, SM Entertainment announced that it would be debuting a new girl group, the first since Red Velvet in 2014 and the first overall idol group since NCT in 2016. The members were revealed individually from October 27 to 30 (in order: Winter, Karina, Ningning, and Giselle) as well as the name Aespa, which was created by combining 'AE' which expresses 'Avatar X Experience' and 'aspect' meaning both sides. SM Entertainment founder Lee Soo-man further explained about Aespa's concept in the 2020 World Cultural Industry Forum that was held online on October 28. A video trailer with all four members was revealed on November 2. On the same day, the agency announced that Aespa would release their debut single "Black Mamba" on November 17. The music video teaser was released on November 15, and the song officially premiered on November 17.

== Composition ==
"Black Mamba"
"Black Mamba" is an electropop and dance-pop track that tells a story of interference with the members' connection to their avatars.

"Black Mamba" was written and composed by Omega, Ella Isaacson, Gabriela Geneva (NIIVA), Jordan Reyes, Shaun Lopez, Scott Chesak, and Yoo Young-jin while production was handled by Lee Soo-man. The song was described as an electropop and dance-pop track with a signature synth sound, a bass-heavy hook and a sweeping bridge that highlights the girls' talented vocalists. It runs for two minutes and fifty-four seconds. Lyrically, the song is about a being called "Black Mamba" that not only interferes with the members' connection to their avatars but also threatens their world. "Black Mamba" is the first song to explain the worldview of Aespa.

== Commercial performance ==
The song debuted at number 117 on South Korea's Gaon Digital Chart with Gaon index of 4,439,664 on the chart issue dated November 15–21, 2020, until it reached its peak position at number 49, three weeks after its release. On the same week, the song debuted at number five on the US Billboard World Digital Songs, giving Aespa their first top five hit on the chart. On the Global 200 chart, "Black Mamba" reached number 183 with 18.9 million global streams and 3,000 global downloads sold. In its second week the song rose to number 138. In New Zealand, the song debuted at number 37 on the RMNZ Hot Singles chart.

In Japan, the song was certified gold by the Recording Industry Association of Japan for 50,000,000 streaming units.

== Critical reception and accolades ==
Professional ratings
Review scores
Source	Rating
IZM	3/5 stars

Following its release, "Black Mamba" was met with positive reviews from music critics. Despite being a new group debut song, "Black Mamba" appeared in several publications' year-end lists, being cited as one of the best K-pop releases in 2020. Dazed magazine ranked the song at number 33 on their list, praising its "cleverly set up what looks to be a new fantasy world story". Hypebae chose the song as one of their Best K-Pop Songs and Music Videos of 2020, citing it as "a futuristic theme that appropriately reflects 2020". Furthermore, the song was featured on Paper's The 40 Best K-Pop Songs of 2020 at number 40, stating that "Black Mamba" is "a safe fusion of pop and EDM with a bass-heavy hook and a sweeping bridge". BuzzFeed included it in their list of 35 Songs That Helped Define K-Pop In 2020 at number 34.

"Black Mamba" received a music program award on the January 17, 2021, broadcast of Inkigayo. At the 2021 Gaon Chart Music Awards, the song won the New Artist of the Year – Digital award.

== Music video ==
=== Background ===
When the music video was uploaded to SM Entertainment's YouTube channel on November 17, 2020, it became the most-viewed debut video by a K-pop group with 21.4 million views in 24 hours, beating the record set by "Dalla Dalla" by Itzy in 2019. After nine hours, the music video reached 10 million views, making it the fastest debut music video to reach 10 million views in the history of K-pop. The dance practice video was uploaded on November 27, 2020, and has received over 11 million views as of January 2021. On January 8, 2021, the music video hit 100 million views, which took only 51 days and 12 hours to achieve, setting the new record in K-pop history as the debut music video to gain 100 million views in the shortest period of time.

=== Synopsis ===
A scene in the music video, where Aespa is seen in a neon-colored virtual reality flanked by a group of female backup dancers.

In the music video for "Black Mamba", Aespa's members are seen in a futuristic, surreal reality and meet an enormous black snake. Fantastical, neon-lit scenes of intense, floor-dropping choreography are interspersed with moments that highlight each member exploring this new reality and engaging with the æ-members, and hinting to a villain known as the titular black mamba. Each member connects with her alter ego through a mysterious mobile app called Synk. By the end, a distorted human figure emerges with glitching digital pixels.

=== Plagiarism controversy ===
Before the release of the song, a series of teaser photos and related video content promoting the quartet garnered attention for apparent similarities to the work of several artists previously shared on social media platforms. After the release of the music video, viewers pointed out that several scenes were similar to virtual girl group K/DA's "Pop/Stars" music video, which was released in 2018.

On December 22, 2020, SM released a statement stating that they have contacted the relevant artist and company that are being mentioned in regards to some scenes in the music video to explain their planning intention and on the group virtual world theme. SM further stated that the contacted artist and company understood their intention and have no objection with regards to some scenes in the music video.

== Live performances ==
On November 19, 2020, Aespa released a performance video titled "The Debut Stage," where the group performs "Black Mamba" on a stage that is decorated both physically and digitally. The video features various camera angles as well as computer-generated imagery effects. On November 20, 2020, the group made the debut performance of "Black Mamba" on Music Bank. On November 22, Aespa performed the song on Inkigayo. On November 24, the group performed the song on The Show.

On November 27, the song was performed on Music Bank. The group performed the song on Show! Music Core on November 28. On November 29, Aespa performed "Black Mamba" on Inkigayo. On December 8, the song was performed on The Show. On December 11, 2020, the group performed "Black Mamba" on Music Bank. On December 12, Aespa performed the song on Show! Music Core. During the 2020 KBS Song Festival, held on December 18, 2020, Aespa performed "Black Mamba".

== Credits and personnel ==
Credits adapted from Tidal and Melon.

Studio

- Recorded, edited, engineered for mix, and mixed at SM Booming System
- Mastered at Sonic Korea

Personnel

- SM Entertainment – executive producer
- Lee Soo-man – producer
- Aespa – vocals
- Yoo Young-jin – lyrics, composition, arrangement, music and sound supervisor, directing, background vocals, recording, digital editing, mixing engineer, mixing
- Omega – composition, arrangement
- Ella Isaacson – composition, background vocals
- Gabriela Geneva (NIIVA) – composition, background vocals
- Jordan Reyes – composition, arrangement
- Shaun Lopez – composition, arrangement, background vocals, keys
- Scott Chesak – composition, arrangement
- Kriz – background vocals
- Jeon Hoon – mastering
- Shin Soo-min – mastering assistant

== Charts ==
=== Weekly charts ===
Weekly chart performance
Chart (2020)	Peak position
Global 200 (Billboard)	138
Hong Kong (HKRIA)	13
Malaysia (RIM)	14
New Zealand Hot Singles (RMNZ)	37
Singapore (RIAS)	13
South Korea (Gaon)	49
South Korea (K-pop Hot 100)	21
US World Digital Song Sales (Billboard)	5

=== Monthly charts ===
Monthly chart performance for "Black Mamba"
Chart (2020)	Peak position
South Korea (Gaon)	69
South Korea (K-pop Hot 100)	25

=== Year-end charts ===
Year-end chart performance
Chart (2021)	Position
South Korea (Gaon)	107

== Certifications ==
Streaming certifications for "Black Mamba"
Region	Certification	Certified units/sales
Japan (RIAJ)	Gold	50,000,000^{†}
^{†} Streaming-only figures based on certification alone.

== Release history ==
Release dates and formats
Region	Date	Format	Label	Ref.
Various	November 17, 2020	Digital download, streaming	SM Entertainment; Dreamus	

== See also ==
- List of Inkigayo Chart winners (2021)
