= Last Bell =

- Digital cover

Single album by TWS
- Released: November 25, 2024
- Genre: K-pop
- Length: 9:21
- Language: Korean; English
- Label: Pledis

TWS chronology
Summer Beat! (2024)	Last Bell (2024)	Try with Us (2025)

Singles from Last Bell
- 1. "Last Festival" Released: November 25, 2024

Last Bell is the first single album (Note: Marketed as the group's first single.) by South Korean boy group TWS. It was released on November 25, 2024, by Pledis Entertainment, along with the lead single "Last Festival".

== Background and release ==
TWS debuted in January 2024 with the EP Sparkling Blue, and followed it up four months later with Summer Beat!. Both were commercially successful, with each EP achieving sales of over 500,000 copies. On October 10, Pledis Entertainment announced that the band would be releasing new material in November, their third new release of the year. Last Bell, TWS's first single album, was announced on November 4 with a teaser video uploaded to the band's official YouTube channel.

A trailer for the album was released on November 9. The trailer, running one minute 34 seconds, portrays the band as high school students preparing for what will be their last winter festival play before graduation, A Midwinter Might's Dream. The band is shown interacting with girls who affectionately watch them rehearse, teaching them choreography, decorating the stage, and practicing lines. The same day, the band shared a phone number that fans could call on their official social media channels. Callers were connected to an interactive voice response line that played "playful" messages from the band's members. Over 10,000 fans connected to the line within the first 10 minutes after posting, with tens of thousands of additional calls being rejected due to the service being over capacity. The single album was released on November 25, 2024.

== Composition ==
The single album's lead single "Last Festival" (Korean: 마지막 축제; RR: Majimak chukje) contains an interpolation of the song of the same name by Seo Taiji and Boys, taken from the group's 1993 album Seo Taiji and Boys II. The song is described as a "refreshing winter song" that is completely different from the original track.

== Promotion ==
On the day of release, the band will hold a showcase concert performing songs from the album at Blue Square Mastercard Hall in Yongsan District, Seoul.

== Track listing ==
Last Bell track listing
No.	Title	Lyrics	Music	Arrangement	Length
1.	"Highlight" (너의 이름; Neoui ireum; lit. Your name)	Im Su-ran (Lalala Studio); Gu Tae-woo; Kim Da-bin (Papermaker)	82oom (Papermaker); Lujah (Papermaker); Ichan (Papermaker); Joe Cho; Jword	82oom; Lujah	3:14
2.	"Last Festival" (마지막 축제; Majimak chukje)	Seo Taiji; Jin Jeon; Hey Farmer; Heon Seo (153/Joombas); Brother Su; Moon Yeo-reum (Jam Factory); Kin Hye-jeong	Jeon; Seo; Nmore; Stella Jones (153/Joombas); Ninos Hanna; William Segerdahl; Charlotte Wilson (153/Joombas); Celotron (Decade+); Ebenezer	Jeon	3:11
3.	"Comma," (점 대신 쉼표를 그려; Jeom daesin swimpyoreul geuryeo; lit. Draw a comma instead of a period)	Kim Sang-eun (Jam Factory)	Carl Ryden; Ben Samama; Will Simms	Ryden; Samama; Simms	2:56
Total length:					9:21

== Charts ==
=== Weekly charts ===
Weekly chart performance
Chart (2024)	Peak position
Japan (Oricon)	1
Japan Combined Singles (Oricon)	1
Japan Top Singles Sales (Billboard Japan)	1
South Korean Albums (Circle)	1
UK Physical Singles (OCC)	89

=== Monthly charts ===
Monthly chart performance
Chart (2024)	Position
Japan (Oricon)	4
South Korean Albums (Circle)	7

=== Year-end charts ===
Year-end chart performance
Chart (2024)	Position
Japan (Oricon)	77
South Korean Albums (Circle)	52

Year-end chart performance
Chart (2025)	Position
Japan Top Singles Sales (Billboard Japan)	75

== Certifications ==
Certifications
Region	Certification	Certified units/sales
South Korea (KMCA)	Platinum	250,000^{^}
^{^} Shipments figures based on certification alone.

== Release history ==
Release history
Region	Date	Format	Label	Ref.
Various	November 25, 2024	Digital download; streaming	Pledis	
South Korea	November 25, 2024	CD	Pledis	
Japan	December 3, 2024	CD single	Pledis	
United States	December 6, 2024	CD single	Pledis	
