= 2024 Melon Music Awards =

2024 South Korean music award ceremony

- Title card
- Date: November 30, 2024
- Venue: Inspire Arena
- Country: South Korea

Highlights
- Most wins: Aespa (7)
- Most nominations: Aespa; IU; TWS (7 each)
- Website: melon.com/mma/info.htm

Television/radio coverage
- Network: Melon; U-Next; 1theK

The 2024 Melon Music Awards (Korean: 2024 멜론 뮤직어워드), part of the Melon Music Awards series, was an awards ceremony held on November 30, 2024. It was organized by Melon, and Kakao Entertainment and broadcast through Melon, 1theK for global audience, and Unext in Japan.

Aespa, IU, and TWS are the most nominated artists at the ceremony, with seven nominations each. Three of them and (G)I-dle are nominated in all the main Daesang categories: Album of the Year, Artist of the Year, and Song of the Year. Aespa won seven awards, with three Daesangs for Song of the Year, Artist of the Year and Album of the Year, set record for a girl group with most winning in a single ceremony, while Record of the Year went to (G)I-dle.

== Criteria ==
All songs and albums that are eligible to be nominated must be released from November 2, 2023, to October 30, 2024.

Category	Digital sales	Online voting	Panelist
Grand Prize (Note: Consists of Album of the Year, Artist of the Year, and Song of the Year)	60%	20%	20%
Record of the Year	N/A		100%
Top 10 Awards (Note: Consists of Top 10 and Millions Top 10)	80%	20%	N/A
Main Awards (Note: Consists of Rookie of the Year, Best Pop Artist, Best Male Solo, Best Female Solo, Best Male Group, Best Female Group, and Best OST)	60%	20%	20%
Hot Trend Award	70%	N/A	30%
Kakao Bank's Favorite Star Award	N/A	80%	20%
Track Zero Choice	20%	20%	60%
Special Awards (Note: Consists of Stage of the Year, Best Music Style, Music Video of the Year, Songwriter Award, Producer Award, J-pop Favorite Artist, Best Male Performance, Best Female Performance, Global Artist, and Global Rising Artist)	N/A		100%

== Performers ==
The list of performers was announced throughout November, with the final line-up revealed on November 21.

List of performances
Artist(s)	Song(s) performed	Segment
QWER	"My Name Is Malgeum" "T.B.H"	First Love
TripleS	"Girls Never Die"	Girls Assemble!
Lee Young-ji	"16 (Intro)" "My Cat" "Small Girl" (with Sohee)	Specialize Every Moment
Christopher	"Bad" "Trouble" (with Lee Young-ji)	Specialize Every Moment
Plave	"Way 4 Luv" "Pump Up the Volume!"	Welcome to the New World
Bibi	"Bam Yang Gang" "Derre"	LO...VE
TWS	"Plot Twist" "Double Take" "Last Festival"	Press the Next Chapter
BoyNextDoor	"Intro" "Dangerous" "Earth, Wind & Fire"	My Youth is Free!
Yoasobi	"Intro" / "Idol" "New Me"	The Boundary
Riize	"Combo" "Boom Boom Bass"	Love Your Rockstar
Ateez	"Work" "Ice on My Teeth"	Our Journey Never Dies
Ive	"Heya" "Ice Queen" "Accendio"	The Magic Music Box
(G)I-dle	Intro: "Latata" (Soyeon solo) / "Hann (Alone)" (Shuhua solo) / "Lion" (Minnie solo) / "Tomboy" (Yuqi solo) / "Queencard" (Miyeon solo) "Fate"	Welcome, I Festival
Aespa	"Whiplash" "Supernova" "Armageddon"	Game Changer

== Presenters ==
The list of presenters was announced throughout November, with the final line-up revealed on November 26.

- JAESSBEE – Red carpet host
- Jang Won-young – Opening speech
- Kim Young-dae and Han Ji-hyun – presented Top 10 Award
- Jang Geun-suk – presented Top 10 Award
- Bae In-hyuk and Lee Yul-eum – presented Top 10 Award and Music Video of the Year
- Choi Hyun-seok and Song Hae-na – presented Best Performance – Male and Best Performance – Female
- Lee Chang-ho and Park Se-mi – presented J-Pop Favorite Artist and Global Rising Artist
- Kim Won-hoon and Uhm Ji-yoon – presented Best Female Group and Best Male Group
- Moon Geun-young – presented Millions Top 10
- Cha Woo-min and Park Yoo-na – presented Songwriter Award and Best Producer
- Lee Se-hee and Yoon Ji-on – presented Hot Trend and Stage of the Year
- JAESSBEE – presented 1theK Global Icon
- Kang Hoon and Keum Sae-rok – presented New Artist of the Year
- Kim Bo-ra and Nam Yoon-su – presented Best Music Style
- Kim Jun-ho and Sung Hae-eun – presented Kakao Bank Everyone's Star
- Ahn Jae-hyun – presented Millions Top 10
- Risabae – presented Global Artist – Male and Global Artist – Female
- Lee Je-hoon – presented Song of the Year (Daesang) and Artist of the Year (Daesang)
- Uhm Jung-hwa – presented Record of the Year (Daesang) and Album of the Year (Daesang)

== Winners and nominees ==
The list of nominees for Top 10 Award was announced on October 31, 2024, through the official website. Voting took place from October 31 to November 14, 2024. The remaining categories, excluding Record of the Year and Hot Trend Award, were announced on November 15. Voting began that same day, and ended on November 29.

Winners and nominees are listed in alphanumerical order, with winners listed first and emphasized in bold.

=== Grand Prize ===
List of winners and nominees for the Grand prize
**Album of the Year** **(Daesang)**: **Aespa – Armageddon**; (G)I-dle – 2; Day6 – Fourever; IU – The Winning; Plave – Asterum: 134-1; List of longlisted nominees: Illit – Super Real Me; Jung Kook – Golden; Le Sserafim – Easy; Taeyeon – To. X; TWS – Sparkling Blue	**Artist of the Year** **(Daesang)**: **Aespa**; (G)I-dle; Day6; NewJeans; Plave; List of longlisted nominees: IU; Jung Kook; Riize; Seventeen; TWS
**Song of the Year** **(Daesang)**: **Aespa – "Supernova"**; (G)I-dle – "Fate"; IU – "Love Wins All"; Lee Chang-sub – "Heavenly Fate"; TWS – "Plot Twist"; List of longlisted nominees: Bibi – "Bam Yang Gang"; Illit – "Magnetic"; Lee Mu-jin – "Episode"; Lim Jae-hyun – "Rhapsody of Sadness"; Taeyeon – "To. X"	**Record of the Year** **(Daesang)**: **(G)I-dle**

=== Main awards ===
List of winners and nominees for the main awards
**Top 10**: **(G)I-dle**; **Aespa**; **Day6**; **IU**; **Jung Kook**; **NewJeans**; **Plave**; **Riize**; **Seventeen**; **TWS**; List of nominees: Babymonster; Bibi; Bol4; Crush; Eclipse (Note: Eclipse is a fictional band from the series Lovely Runner. The song is performed by Byeon Woo-seok as vocalist, Lee Seung-hyub as guitarist, Yang Hyuk as bassist, and Moon Yong-suk as drummer.); Illit; Ive; Kiss of Life; Le Sserafim; Lee Chang-sub; Lee Mu-jin; Lee Young-ji; Lim Jae-hyun; Nmixx; QWER; Red Velvet; Roy Kim; Taeyeon; Viviz; Zico	**Millions Top 10**: **Aespa – Armageddon**; **Day6 – Band Aid**; **IU – The Winning**; **Ive – Ive Switch**; **Jung Kook – Golden**; **Lim Young-woong – "Warmth"**; **NewJeans – "How Sweet"**; **Plave – Asterum: 134-1**; **Riize – Riizing**; **Taeyeon – To. X**; List of longlisted nominees: Baekhyun – Hello, World; BoyNextDoor – 19.99; D.O. – Blossom; Doyoung – Youth; Hwang Young-woong – 당신 편; Jaehyun – J; Jimin – Muse; JxW – This Man; Lee Chan-won – Bright; NCT 127 – Walk; NCT Dream – Dream()scape; Red Velvet – Chill Kill; Seventeen – Spill the Feels; Stray Kids – Rock-Star; Taeyong – Tap; The Boyz – Trigger; Tomorrow X Together – Minisode 3: Tomorrow; Young Tak – SuperSuper; Zerobaseone – Melting Point; Zico – "Spot!" (featuring Jennie)
**Best Male Solo**: **Jung Kook**; Lee Chang-sub; Lee Mu-jin; Lim Jae-hyun; Zico	**Best Female Solo**: **IU**; Bibi; Bol4; Lee Young-ji; Taeyeon
**Best Male Group**: **Riize**; Day6; Plave; Seventeen; TWS	**Best Female Group**: **Aespa**; (G)I-dle; Illit; Le Sserafim; NewJeans
**New Artist of the Year**: **Illit**; **TWS**; Babymonster; Meovv; Pagaehun	**Best Pop Artist**: **Benson Boone**; Ariana Grande; Ayumu Imazu; Max; Sabrina Carpenter
**Best OST**: **Eclipse – "Sudden Shower" (from Lovely Runner)**; 10cm – "Spring Snow" (from Lovely Runner); Crush – "Love You With All My Heart" (from Queen of Tears); Roy Kim – "Whenever, Wherever" (from My Demon); Taeyeon – "Dream" (from Welcome to Samdal-ri)

=== Popularity awards ===
List of winners for the special awards
**Track Zero Choice**: **Hyukoh & Sunset Rollercoaster – "Young Man"**; Bongjeingan – "Know You Did"; Danpyunsun and the Moments Ensemble – "Independent"; Hanroro – "H O M E"; Kim Sa-wol– "Default"; O'KOYE – "O'KOYE" (featuring Yun Seok-cheol); Savina & Drones – "Nobody Knows"; Sumin & Slom – "Why, Why, Why"; The Solutions – "N/A"; Wave to Earth – "Annie."	**Kakao Bank Everyone's Star**: **Riize**; (G)I-dle; Aespa; Day6; IU; Jung Kook; NewJeans; Plave; Seventeen; TWS
**Hot Trend Award**: **QWER**

=== Special awards ===
List of winners for the special awards
**1theK Global Icon**: **TripleS**	**Best Music Style**: **Bibi**; **Lee Young-ji**
**Best Performance – Female**: **Aespa**	**Best Performance – Male**: **BoyNextDoor**
**Best Producer**: **Seo Hyun-joo (Starship Entertainment)**	**Best Songwriter**: **Jeon So-yeon (Cube Entertainment)**
**Global Artist – Female**: **Ive**	**Global Artist – Male**: **Ateez**
**Global Rising Artist**: **Riize**	**J-Pop Favorite Artist**: **Yoasobi**
**Music Video of the Year**: **Ive – "Heya"**	**Stage of the Year**: **IU – HEREH World Tour**

== Multiple awards ==
The following artist(s) received two or more awards:

Count	Artist(s)
7	Aespa
5	Riize
4	IU
3	Ive
3	Jungkook
2	(G)I-dle
2	Day6
2	NewJeans
2	Plave
2	TWS
