= Summer Beat! =

- Digital cover

EP by TWS
- Released: June 24, 2024
- Genre: K-pop
- Length: 17:09
- Languages: Korean; English
- Label: Pledis

TWS chronology
Sparkling Blue (2024)	Summer Beat! (2024)	Last Bell (2024)

Singles from Summer Beat!
- 1. "Hey! Hey!" Released: June 5, 2024; 2. "If I'm S, Can You Be My N?" Released: June 24, 2024

Summer Beat! is the second extended play (EP) by South Korean boy band TWS, released on June 24, 2024, through Pledis Entertainment. It was promoted by the singles "Hey! Hey!" and "If I'm S, Can You Be My N?". It debuted atop the Circle Album Chart and at number two on the Japanese Oricon Albums Chart.

== Background and release ==
TWS debuted in January 2024 with the release of their first EP Sparkling Blue. The EP sold more than 500,000 units, and the lead single, "Plot Twist" reached number two on the Circle Digital Chart. On May 3 Pledis Entertainment confirmed that the band was working on their followup, to be released in June. A teaser video was released onto the group's official YouTube channel on May 23 entitled "Our Memories: Now", indicating the project was due to be released on June 24.

The EP's title was officially confirmed to be Summer Beat! in an announcement on May 27. The same announcement also confirmed the EP's release date. A pre-release single, "Hey! Hey!" was released on June 5, along with its music video. The EP's full track listing was released on June 13, confirming the lead single to be "If I'm S, Can You Be My N?"

Summer Beat was released on June 24, 2024, along with its lead single "If I'm S, Can You Be My N?" and accompanying music video. The band also held a media showcase on the same day at Blue Square Mastercard Hall in Yongsan District, Seoul, performing songs from the EP.

== Composition ==
"If I'm S, Can You Be My N?"
"If I'm S, Can You Be My N?" blends elements of "funky" rhythms and vivid synth sounds.

Summer Beat! is characterized as a K-pop EP that blends various music styles such as Jersey club beats, boom bap and rock under a genre that TWS brands as "boyhood pop" The songs are described as having "bright, summer vibes" while being "easy to sing along to".

The EP opens with "You+Me=7942", a song with an "addictive" chorus drop and rap verses. The next track, "If I'm S, Can You Be My N?" is the EP's lead single and blends elements of "funky" rhythms and vivid synth sounds. "Hey! Hey", the first track to be released, is a rock-influenced song with guitar riffs and "heart-rendering" drums. "Double Take" is a hip hop song with boom bap influence, heavy bass, and darker production. "Keep On" is a synth-pop song, while the EP's final song, "Fire Confetti" is a track influenced by Jersey club sounds.

== Commercial performance ==
Summer Beat! debuted at number one on the South Korean Circle Album Chart, where it sold 489,200 copies in its first week. On the monthly Circle Album Chart, the EP debuted at number four. The EP also debuted at number two on both the Japanese Oricon Albums Chart and Billboard Japan Hot Albums chart. In the United States, Summer Beat! opened at number 22 on the Heatseekers Albums chart and number 49 on the Top Album Sales chart.

The EP has been certified 2× Platinum by the Korea Music Content Association for sales of over 500,000 copies.

== Track listing ==
Summer Beat! track listing
No.	Title	Lyrics	Music	Arrangement	Length
1.	"You+Me=7942" (Korean: 너+나=7942; RR: Neo+na=7942)	Glenn; Jeon Jin; Heon Seo	Building Owner; Glenn; Bicksancho (Yummy Tone); Heon Seo; Wasurenai; Jeon; Nmore	Building Owner; Bicksancho	2:22
2.	"If I'm S, Can You Be My N?" (Korean: 내가 S면 넌 나의 N이 되어줘; RR: Naega Smyeon neon naui Ni doeeojwo)	Wasurenai; Jeon; Glenn; Brother Su; Haon	Jeon; Glenn; Heon Seo; Wasurenai	Park Ki-tae (Prismfilter); Nmore; Jeon	2:48
3.	"Hey! Hey!"	Wasurenai; Glenn; Choi Bo-ra (153/Joombas); Song Ji-yu (Jamfactory); Jang Min-woo (Lalala Studio)	T-SK; Glenn; Heon Seo; Anchor; Wasurenai; YouthK; Jeon	T-SK; Ohway!	3:12
4.	"Double Take"	Jeon; Im Soo-ran; Kim Hye-jeong (makeumine works); Rizin (153/Joombas); Park Hyun-jung (Jamfactory); Wasurenai; MLC; Ronnie Icon; Willie Weeks	Wasurenai; MLC; Icon; Weeks		2:19
5.	"Keep On" (Korean: 내가 태양이라면; RR: Naega taeyangiramyeon; lit. 'If I were the sun')	Kenzie	Kenzie; Wasurenai; Jeon; Heon Seo	Park; Jeon	3:24
6.	"Fire Confetti"	Im; Jung Ha-ri (153/Joombas); Hwang Soo-min (153/Joombas); Oh Yeon-joo (153/Joombas)	Versachoi; Kevin Gomringer; Tim Gomringer; Mohamed Azisi; Gabriel Brandes; Ninos Hanna; Simon Gaudes	Versachoi; Cubeatz; Shisui; Klimperboy; Building Owner; Jeon	3:02
Total length:					17:09

== Charts ==
=== Weekly charts ===
Weekly chart performance
Chart (2024)	Peak position
Japanese Albums (Oricon)	2
Japanese Hot Albums (Billboard Japan)	2
South Korean Albums (Circle)	1
UK Physical Singles (OCC)	11
US Heatseekers Albums (Billboard)	22
US Top Album Sales (Billboard)	49
US World Albums (Billboard)	14

=== Monthly charts ===
Monthly chart performance
Chart (2024)	Peak position
Japanese Albums (Oricon)	6
South Korean Albums (Circle)	4

=== Year-end charts ===
Year-end chart performance
Chart (2024)	Position
Japanese Albums (Oricon)	78
Japanese Hot Albums (Billboard Japan)	85
South Korean Albums (Circle)	43

== Certifications and sales ==
Certifications and sales
Region	Certification	Certified units/sales
South Korea (KMCA)	2× Platinum	500,000^{^}
^{^} Shipments figures based on certification alone.

== Release history ==
Release history
Region	Date	Format	Label
South Korea	June 24, 2024	CD	Pledis
Various	June 24, 2024	Digital download; streaming	Pledis
