= TWS (group) =

South Korean boy band

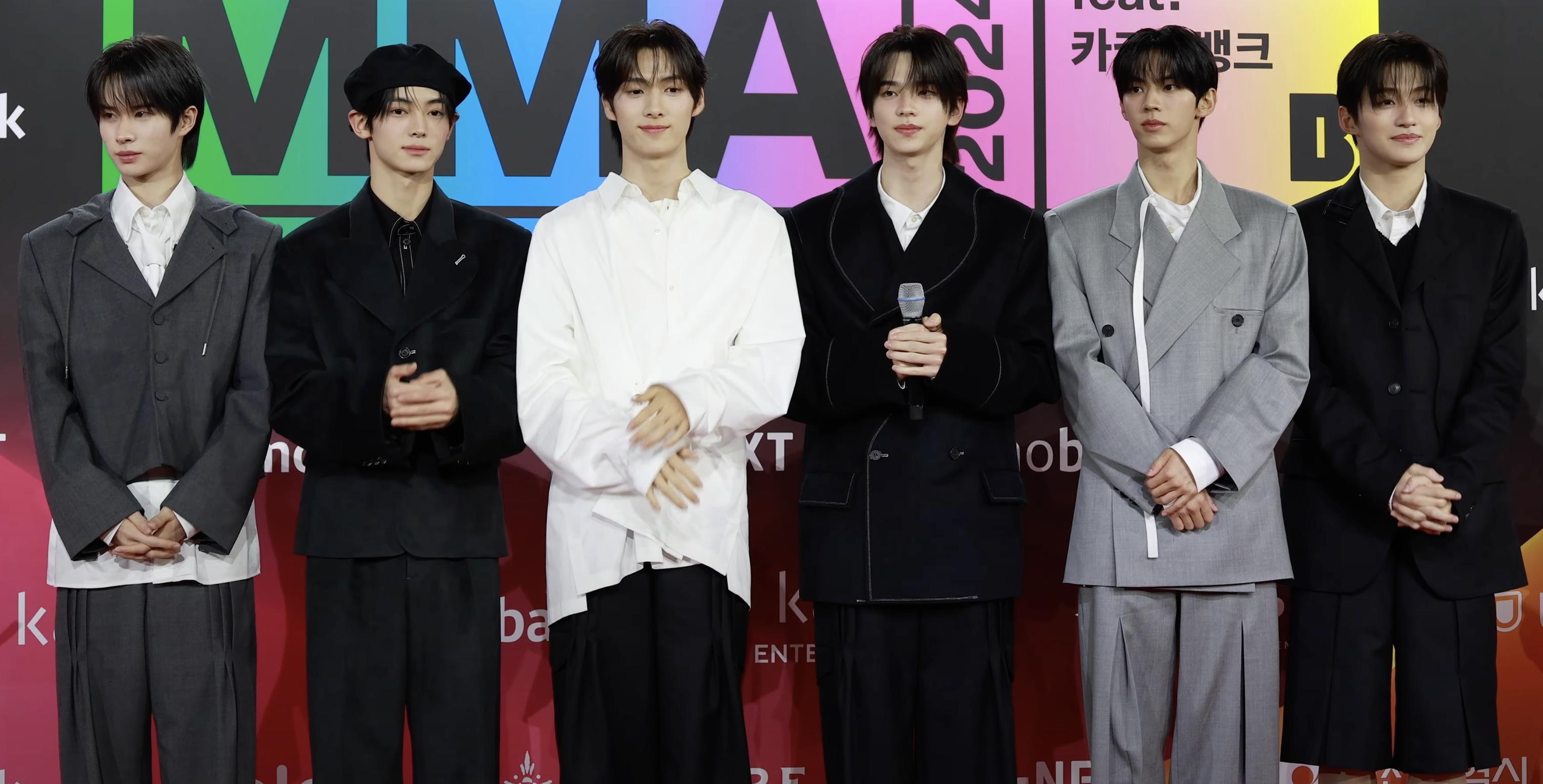
- TWS in November 2024; Left to right: Kyungmin, Hanjin, Youngjae, Shinyu, Dohoon, Jihoon

Background information
- Also known as: Twenty Four Seven With Us
- Origin: Seoul, South Korea
- Genre: K-pop
- Years active: 2024–present
- Labels: Pledis; Interscope
- Members: Shinyu; Dohoon; Youngjae; Hanjin; Jihoon; Kyungmin
- Website: pledis.co.kr/tws

TWS (/tuː-ʌs/; Korean: 투어스; RR: Tueoseu; pronounced as "Two-Us"; an abbreviation for Twenty Four Seven With Us) is a South Korean boy band formed and managed by Pledis Entertainment. The group consists of six members: Shinyu, Dohoon, Youngjae, Hanjin, Jihoon, and Kyungmin. They label their music as "boyhood pop", which depicts the daily lives of boys. They debuted on January 22, 2024, with the extended play (EP) Sparkling Blue.

== Name ==
TWS is an abbreviation of "Twenty Four Seven With Us". The number 24 for a day and the number 7 for a week means "every moment". In other words, it means "always with TWS". The name reflects the group's stated goal of being a constant presence for their fans, aiming to make ordinary moments feel special through their music.

== History ==
=== Formation and pre-debut activities ===
On November 7, 2023, Pledis Entertainment announced their plan to launch a new boy band in the first quarter of 2024. Five members of the then-unnamed boy band, with their faces covered, were first introduced by Seventeen member Hoshi, during the SVT Caratland event in 2023. On December 21, the group's name–TWS–was revealed. The agency explained that the name is derived from the group's tagline "twenty-four-seven with us", which reflects the group's commitment to maintaining an enduring connection with their fans. On January 3, 2024, the watch strap brand TWMStrap accused the group of plagiarizing their logo, announcing their intentions to file a legal complaint against the agency.

=== 2024: Debut with Sparkling Blue and Summer Beat! ===
Producer and Pledis Entertainment CEO Han Sung-soo spearheaded the production for TWS's debut EP Sparkling Blue, which was released on January 22, 2024, following the release of the pre-release track "Oh MyMy:7s" from the album. Aiming to establish "boyhood pop" with Sparkling Blue, the album was led by the single "Plot Twist", which discussed the "thrill of a first encounter". Just twenty-three days after debut, they took their first music show win on Show Champion.

On May 3, Pledis announced that TWS would release a new album in early June. On May 23, the group released a video titled "Our Memories: Now" and revealed the album release date to be on June 24. Four days later, the group revealed Summer Beat! as the title of their second EP. TWS released the pre-release track "Hey! Hey!" on June 5, and their second EP along with its single "If I'm S, Can You Be My N?" on June 24. The EP was commercially successful, selling over 500,000 copies.

Last Bell, TWS's first single album and third release of 2024, was announced on November 4, with a teaser video uploaded to the band's official YouTube channel. The project was released on November 25.

On April 21, 2025, TWS released their third EP, Try with Us. Their fourth EP, Play Hard, was released on October 13, led by the single "Head Shoulders Knees Toes".

== Public image ==
Pledis Entertainment introduced TWS as a "next generation" group with the goal of establishing a new genre called "boyhood pop", which focuses on capturing the daily stories of its members. Since their debut, the group presents a musical and visual style that captures the male youth experience, as their music addresses universal themes and presents a relatable image that appeals to a broader audience. The songs on their first mini-album, Sparkling Blue, reflect daily stories and emotions that young people can identify with. Pop culture critic Kim Do-heon noted that the group's success was attributed to the "three-part narrative around the theme of school youth growth", which helped to shape their musical identity and success in their debut.

== Endorsements ==
On January 19, 2024, TWS before their official debut, were selected as the models for Lotte Chilsung Beverage's Milkis. On February 1, TWS were named as endorsers for Shinsegae Duty Free through their "Play with Us" campaign. On March 19, TWS were announced as the new models for Kangol, a British heritage global brand. On November 22, French luxury fashion house Celine chose TWS as its brand ambassadors.

In April 2025, it was announced that TWS was selected as new brand muse of B.Cave's street fashion brand Wackywilly, participating in its "Keep Growing, Buddy!" campaign.

In June 2026, TWS collaborated with the Korea Tourism Organization as part of its new inbound tourism campaign "BIAS (Be In Artists' Scenes)", to promote famous landmarks and experiential products in South Korea.

== Members ==
- Shinyu (신유) – leader
- Dohoon (도훈)
- Youngjae (영재)
- Hanjin (한진)
- Jihoon (지훈)
- Kyungmin (경민)

== Discography ==
=== Extended plays ===
List of extended plays, showing selected details, selected chart positions, sales figures, and certifications
Title	Details	Peak chart positions							Sales	Certifications
Title	Details	KOR	BEL (FL)	JPN	JPN Hot	US Sales	US Heat.	US World	Sales	Certifications
Sparkling Blue	Released: January 22, 2024; Labels: Pledis; Format: CD, digital download, streaming	1	80	3	4	16	8	6	KOR: 548,287; JPN: 52,101	KMCA: Platinum
Summer Beat!	Released: June 24, 2024; Labels: Pledis; Format: CD, digital download, streaming	1	—	2	2	49	22	14	KOR: 626,010; JPN: 51,476	KMCA: 2× Platinum
Try with Us	Released: April 21, 2025; Labels: Pledis; Format: CD, digital download, streaming	1	—	2	5	47	—	13	KOR: 632,749; JPN: 97,345	KMCA: 2× Platinum; RIAJ: Gold (phy.)
Play Hard	Released: October 13, 2025; Labels: Pledis; Format: CD, digital download, streaming	1	—	3	4	—	—	—	KOR: 785,223; JPN: 182,715	KMCA: 3× Platinum; RIAJ: Gold (phy.)
No Tragedy	Released: April 27, 2026; Labels: Pledis; Format: CD, digital download, streaming	1	—	1	2	49	—	14	KOR: 1,283,823; JPN: 268,453	KMCA: Million; RIAJ: Platinum (phy.)
"—" denotes a recording that did not chart or was not released in that region

=== Single albums ===
List of single album, showing selected details, selected chart positions, and sales figures
Title	Details	Peak chart positions		Sales	Certifications
Title	Details	KOR	JPN	Sales	Certifications
Last Bell	Released: November 25, 2024; Labels: Pledis; Formats: CD, digital download, streaming	1	1	KOR: 536,287; JPN: 85,056	KMCA: Platinum; RIAJ: Gold (phy.)
To Us	Released: November 2, 2026; Labels: Pledis; Formats: CD, digital download, streaming	1	4	KOR: 886,542; JPN: 42,320	

=== Singles ===
==== Korean singles ====
List of singles, showing year released, selected chart positions, and name of the album
Title	Year	Peak chart positions			Certifications	Album
Title	Year	KOR	JPN Hot	WW	Certifications	Album
"Oh Mymy:7s"	2024	— (Note: "Oh Mymy:7s" did not enter the Circle Digital Chart, but peaked at number 20 on the component Download Chart.)	—	—	—N/a	Sparkling Blue
"Plot Twist" (첫 만남은 계획대로 되지 않아)	2024	2	— (Note: "Plot Twist" did not enter the Billboard Japan Hot 100, but peaked at number 89 on the Streaming Songs.)	123	KMCA: Platinum (st.); RIAJ: Gold (st.)	Sparkling Blue
"Hey! Hey!"	2024	125	—	—	—N/a	Summer Beat
"If I'm S, Can You Be My N?" (내가 S면 넌 나의 N이 되어줘)	2024	24	— (Note: "If I'm S, Can You Be My N?" did not enter the Billboard Japan Hot 100, but peaked at number 95 on the Streaming Songs.)	—	—N/a	Summer Beat
"Uptown Girl" (Billy Joel cover)	2024	— (Note: "Uptown Girl" did not enter the Circle Digital Chart, but peaked at number 83 on the component Download Chart.)	—	—	—N/a	Non-album single (Note: Recorded for The Seasons: Artist with Zico)
"Last Festival" (마지막 축제)	2024	133	7	—	—N/a	Last Bell
"Countdown" (마음 따라 뛰는 건 멋지지 않아?)	2025	56	—	—	—N/a	Try with Us
"Head Shoulders Knees Toes"	2025	— (Note: "Head Shoulders Knees Toes" did not enter the Circle Digital Chart, but peaked at number 17 on the component Download Chart.)	—	—	—N/a	Play Hard
"Overdrive"	2025	27	45	—	—N/a	Play Hard
"Nice to See You Again (Korean Ver.)" (다시 만난 오늘)	2026	80	—	—	—N/a	Non-album single
"You, You"	2026	81	51	—	—N/a	No Tragedy
"Call My Name"	2026	—	10	—	—N/a	To Us
"—" denotes a recording that did not chart or was not released in that territory.

==== Japanese singles ====
List of Japanese singles, showing year released, selected chart positions, sales figures, and name of the album
Title	Year	Peak chart positions		Sales	Certifications	Album
Title	Year	JPN	JPN Hot	Sales	Certifications	Album
"Nice to See You Again" (はじめまして)	2025	1	1	JPN: 180,845	RIAJ: Platinum (phy.)	Non-album single
"Soda Soda"	2026	2	1	JPN: 225,853	RIAJ: Platinum (phy.)	Non-album single

=== Soundtrack appearances ===
Title	Year	Album
"Brand New Day"	2025	Good Boy OST
"Bloom" (feat. Ayumu Imazu)	2025	April Showers Bring May Flowers OST
"N.O.S.A"	2025	Bullet/Bullet OST

=== Other charted songs ===
List of songs, showing year released, selected chart positions, and name of the album
Title	Year	Peak chart positions		Album
Title	Year	KOR	KOR Down.	Album
"Unplugged Boy"	2024	—	23	Sparkling Blue
"First Hooky"	2024	—	25	Sparkling Blue
"BFF"	2024	—	24	Sparkling Blue
"You+Me=7942" (너+나=7942)	2024	—	25	Summer Beat
"Double Take"	2024	—	31	Summer Beat
"Keep On" (내가 태양이라면)	2024	—	22	Summer Beat
"Fire Confetti"	2024	—	30	Summer Beat
"Highlight" (너의 이름)	2024	—	15	Last Bell
"Comma," (점 대신 쉼표를 그려)	2024	—	20	Last Bell
"All the Possibilities" (너의 모든 가능성이 되어 줄게)	2026	133	—	No Tragedy

== Videography ==
=== Music videos ===
List of music videos, showing year released, and name of the director(s)
Title	Year	Director(s)	Ref.
"Oh Mymy:7s"	2024	Kim Woo-gie	
"Plot Twist"	2024	Oh Ji-won (Undermoodfilm)	
"BFF"	2024	Guzza (Kudo)	
"hey! hey!"	2024	Kim Woo-gie	
"If I'm S, Can You Be My N?"	2024	Seong Won-mo (Digipedi)	
"Last Festival"	2024	Seong Won-mo (Digipedi)	
"Countdown!"	2025	Lafic	
"はじめまして"	2025	Lafic	
"Head Shoulders Knees Toes"	2025	Kim Woo-gie; Jackson Forsythe	
"Overdrive"	2025	Yuji Shin (OBVIOUS)	

=== Other videos ===
Title	Year	Director(s)	Notes	Ref.
"Double Take"	2024	Christian Haahs	Performance video	
"Lucky To Be Loved"	2025	Yuk Heonryoung	Special video	

== Live performances ==
=== Concert tours ===
==== 24/7:With:Us ====
List of concerts, showing event names, dates, cities, countries, venues and attendance
Date (2025)	City	Country	Venue	Attendance	Ref.
June 20	Seoul	South Korea	Jamsil Indoor Stadium	16,000	
June 21	Seoul	South Korea	Jamsil Indoor Stadium	16,000	
June 22	Seoul	South Korea	Jamsil Indoor Stadium	16,000	
July 11	Hiroshima	Japan	Hiroshima Bunka Gakuen HBG Hall	TBA	
July 13	Nagoya	Japan	Nihon Tokushu Togyo Civic Hall	TBA	
July 14	Nagoya	Japan	Nihon Tokushu Togyo Civic Hall	TBA	
July 15	Nagoya	Japan	Nihon Tokushu Togyo Civic Hall	TBA	
July 17	Fukuoka	Japan	Fukuoka Sunpalace	TBA	
July 18	Fukuoka	Japan	Fukuoka Sunpalace	TBA	
July 25	Sendai	Japan	Sendai Sun Plaza	TBA	
July 26	Sendai	Japan	Sendai Sun Plaza	TBA	
July 28	Osaka	Japan	Orix Theater	TBA	
July 29	Osaka	Japan	Orix Theater	TBA	
July 30	Osaka	Japan	Orix Theater	TBA	
August 9	Yokohama	Japan	K-Arena Yokohama	TBA	
August 10	Yokohama	Japan	K-Arena Yokohama	TBA	
January 24, 2026	Macao	China	Studio City Event Center	TBA	
January 31, 2026	Kaohsiung	Taiwan	Kaohsiung Music Center	TBA	

=== Fan meetings ===
List of fan meetings, showing event names, dates, cities, countries, venues and attendance
Event name	Date	City	Country	Venue	Attendance	Ref.
TWS 1st Fan Meeting "42:Club"	February 14, 2025	Seoul	South Korea	SK Olympic Handball Gymnasium	14,000	
TWS 1st Fan Meeting "42:Club"	February 15, 2025	Seoul	South Korea	SK Olympic Handball Gymnasium	14,000	
TWS 1st Fan Meeting "42:Club"	February 16, 2025	Seoul	South Korea	SK Olympic Handball Gymnasium	14,000	
TWS 1st Fan Meeting "42:Club"	March 15, 2025 (Two shows)	Tokyo	Japan	Musashino Forest Sport Plaza	30,000	
TWS 1st Fan Meeting "42:Club"	March 16, 2025	Tokyo	Japan	Musashino Forest Sport Plaza	30,000	

== Accolades ==
=== Awards and nominations ===
Name of the award ceremony, year presented, award category, nominee(s) and the result of the award
Award ceremony	Year	Category	Nominee/work	Result	Ref.
Asia Artist Awards	2024	Rookie of the Year – Music	TWS	Won	
Asia Artist Awards	2025	Best Musician – Group	TWS	Won	
Asia Artist Awards	2026	Popularity Award – Group (Male)	TWS	Pending	
Asia Star Entertainer Awards	2024	Best New Artist	TWS	Won	
D Awards	2025	Rookie of the Year	TWS	Won	
D Awards	2025	Delights Blue Label	TWS	Won	
D Awards	2025	Dreams Silver Label	TWS	Won	
D Awards	2025	Best Popularity Award – Boy Group	TWS	Nominated	
Golden Disc Awards	2025	Best Digital Song (Bonsang)	"Plot Twist"	Won	
Golden Disc Awards	2025	Rookie Artist of the Year	TWS	Won	
Golden Disc Awards	2025	Song of the Year (Daesang)	"Plot Twist"	Nominated	
Golden Disc Awards	2025	Most Popular Artist – Male	TWS	Nominated	
Golden Disc Awards	2026	Best Performance	TWS	Won	
Hanteo Music Awards	2024	Artist of the Year (Bonsang)	TWS	Won	
Hanteo Music Awards	2024	Rookie of the Year – Male	TWS	Nominated	
Hanteo Music Awards	2024	Global Artist – Africa	TWS	Nominated	
Hanteo Music Awards	2024	Global Artist – Asia	TWS	Nominated	
Hanteo Music Awards	2024	Global Artist – Europe	TWS	Nominated	
Hanteo Music Awards	2024	Global Artist – North America	TWS	Nominated	
Hanteo Music Awards	2024	Global Artist – Oceania	TWS	Nominated	
Hanteo Music Awards	2024	Global Artist – South America	TWS	Nominated	
Hanteo Music Awards	2024	WhosFandom Award – Male	TWS	Nominated	
iHeartRadio Music Awards	2025	Best New Artist (K-pop)	TWS	Nominated	
Korean Music Awards	2025	Rookie of the Year	TWS	Nominated	
Korean Music Awards	2025	Best K-pop Song	"Plot Twist"	Nominated	
MAMA Awards	2024	Best New Male Artist	TWS	Won	
MAMA Awards	2024	Best Male Dance Performance	"Plot Twist"	Won	
MAMA Awards	2024	Fans' Choice Male Top 10	TWS	Nominated	
Melon Music Awards	2024	Best New Artist	TWS	Won	
Melon Music Awards	2024	Top 10 Artist	TWS	Won	
Melon Music Awards	2024	Best Male Group	TWS	Nominated	
Melon Music Awards	2024	Kakao Bank Favorite Star Award	TWS	Nominated	
Melon Music Awards	2024	Song of the Year	"Plot Twist"	Nominated	
Seoul Music Awards	2025	Main Prize (Bonsang)	TWS	Nominated	
Seoul Music Awards	2025	Popularity Award	TWS	Nominated	
Seoul Music Awards	2025	K-Wave Special Award	TWS	Nominated	
Seoul Music Awards	2025	K-pop World Choice – Group	TWS	Nominated	

=== Listicles ===
Name of publisher, year listed, name of listicle, and placement
Publisher	Year	Listicle	Placement	Ref.
&Asian	2026	10 Songs That Could Be On a Soundtrack To WWE PPV/PLE	Placed ("Countdown!")	
Forbes Korea	2025	K-Idol of the Year 30	25th	
