= Melon Music Award for Best New Artist =

South Korean music award

- Awarded for: Best new individual/group of the year
- Country: South Korea
- Presented by: Kakao M
- First award: 2005 (online); 2009 (ceremony)
- Currently held by: Alpha Drive One; Lngshot; (2026)
- Website: Official website

The Melon Music Award for Best New Artist is an award presented annually by Kakao M at the annual Melon Music Awards. It was first given at the ceremony's inaugural online ceremony in 2005, and was given in person for the first time starting from the 2009 awards.

== Winners and nominees ==
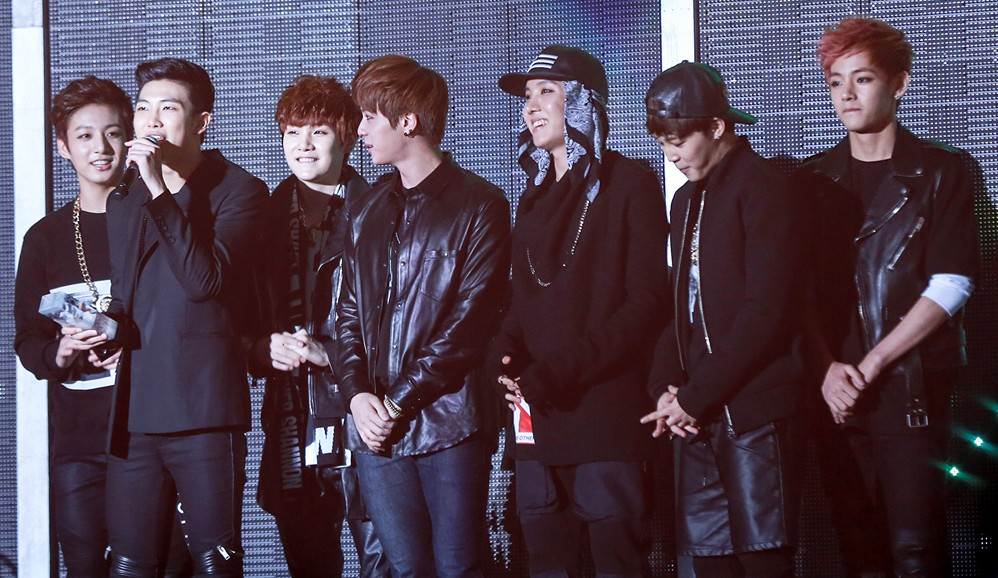
BTS after winning Best New Artist in 2013

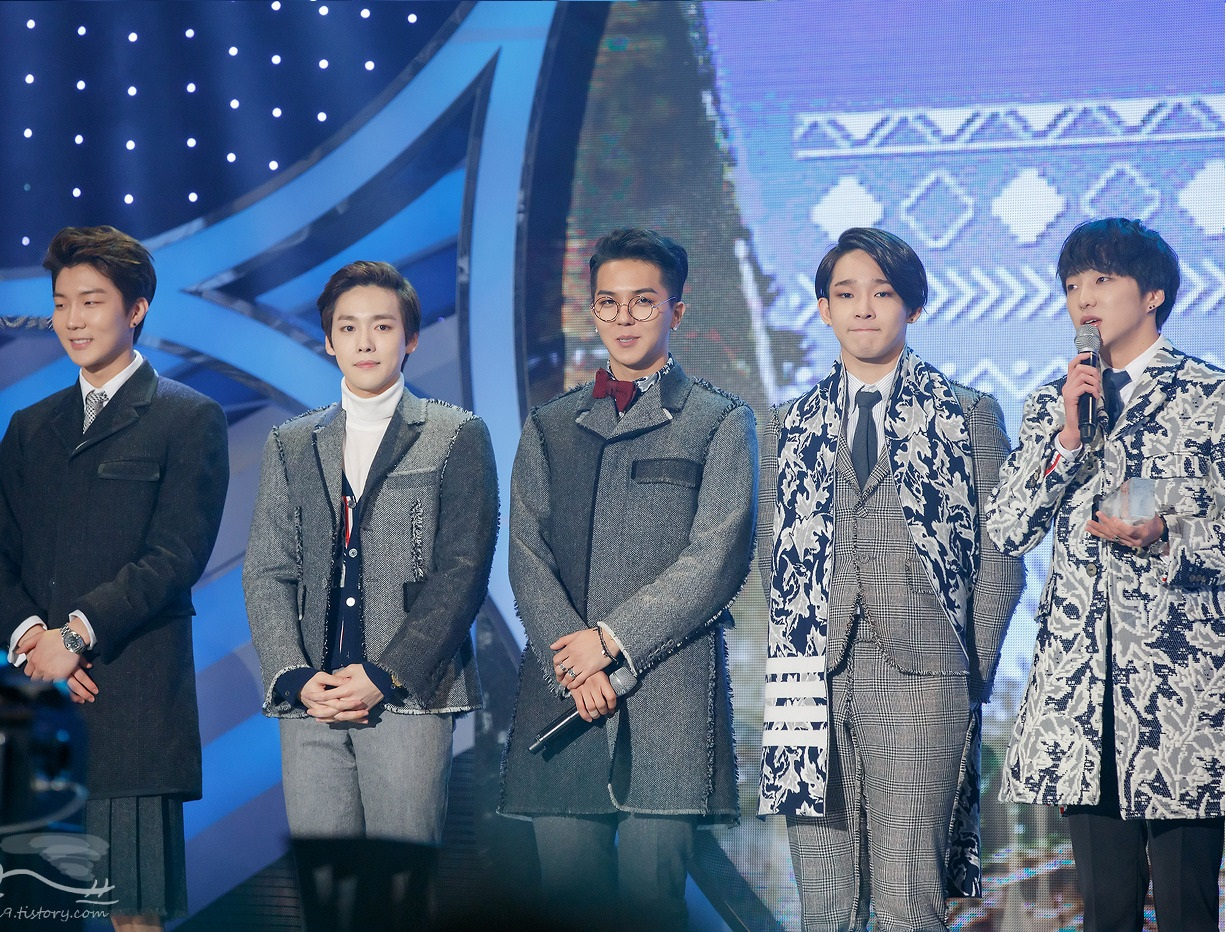
Winner after winning Best New Artist in 2014

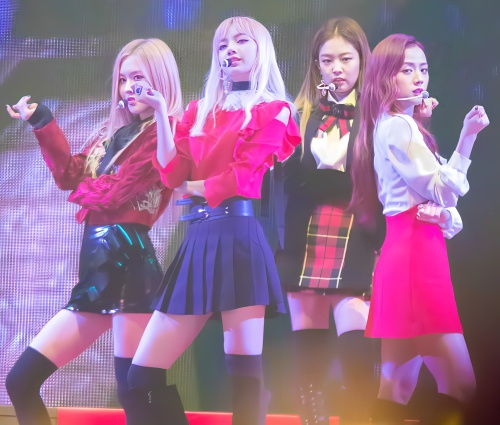
Blackpink at the 2016 Melon Music Awards

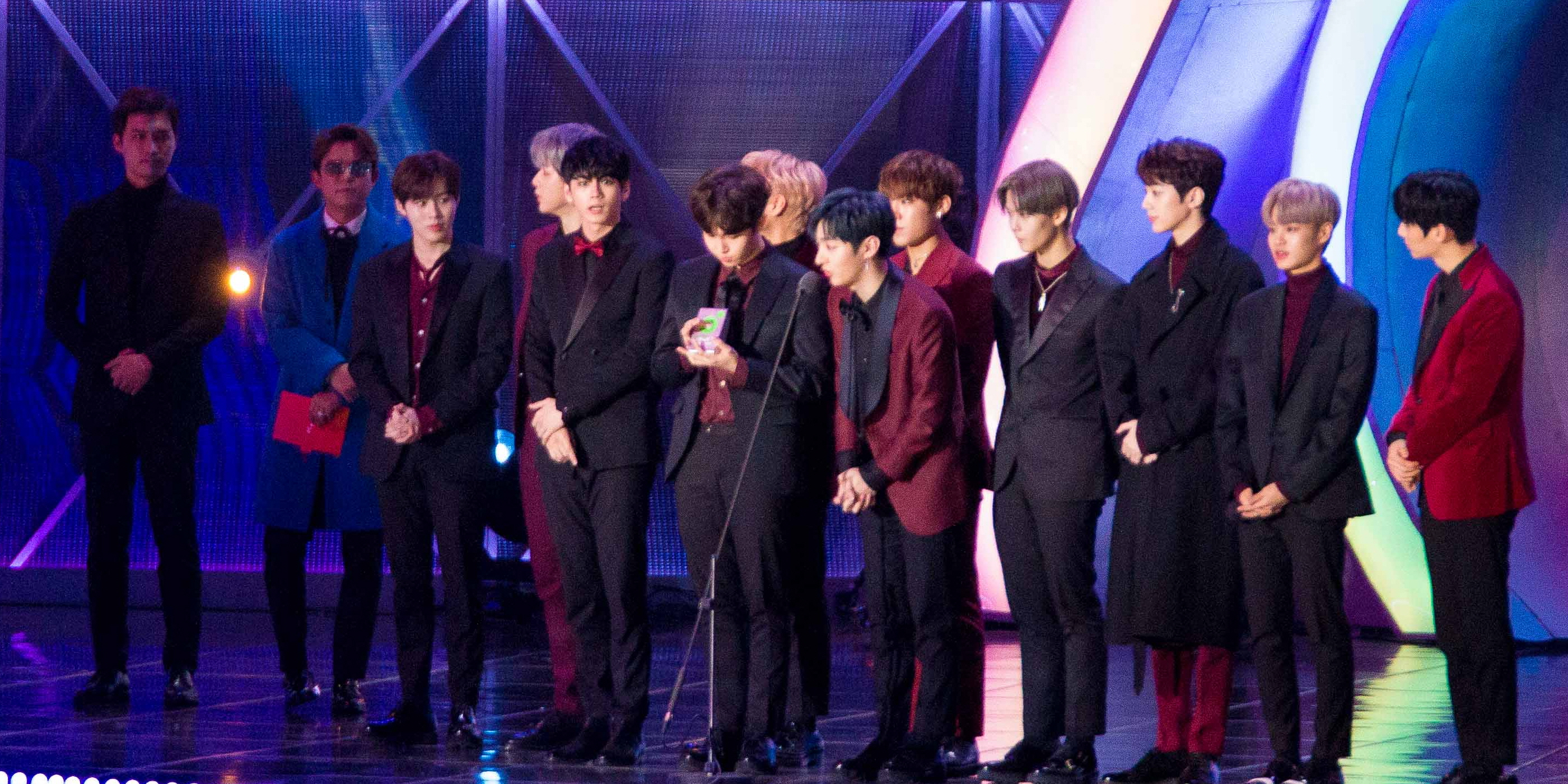
Wanna One after winning Best New Artist in 2017

Winners are listed first and highlighted in bold.

=== 2000s ===
Year (Note: The awards ceremony was conducted online from 2005 to 2008.)	Winners and nominees	Ref.
2005	**Ivy**	
2006	**Super Junior**	
2007	**Wonder Girls**	
2008	**Shinee**	
2009	**2NE1**	
2009	After School	
2009	f(x)	
2009	4Minute	

=== 2010s ===
Year^{[I]}	Winners and nominees		Ref.
2010	**CNBLUE**		
2010	Beast		
2010	Miss A		
2010	Secret		
2010	Sistar		
2011	**Huh Gak**		
2011	F-ve Dolls		
2011	Stephanie Kim		
2011	Dal Shabet		
2011	Brave Girls		
2012	**B.A.P**		
2012	**Ailee**		
2012	Ulala Session		
2012	Lee Hi		
2012	Juniel		
2013	**BTS**		
2013	**Lim Kim**		
2013	Roy Kim		
2013	Ladies' Code		
2013	History		
2014	**Winner**		
2014	Red Velvet		
2014	Mamamoo		
2014	Park Bo-ram		
2014	Eddy Kim		
2015	Male Artist	Female Artist	
2015	**iKon**	**GFriend**	
2015	Monsta X	Lovelyz	
2015	Seventeen	Sonamoo	
2015	Up10tion	CLC	
2015	N.Flying	Oh My Girl	
2016	**Blackpink**		
2016	NCT 127		
2016	Bolbbalgan4		
2016	I.O.I		
2016	WJSN		
2017	**Wanna One**		
2017	Kard		
2017	Pristin		
2017	Woo Won-jae		
2017	Chungha		
2017	Dreamcatcher		
2018	Male Artist	Female Artist	
2018	**The Boyz**	**(G)I-dle**	
2018	Yoo Seon-ho	Iz*One	
2018	Haon	Loona	
2018	Stray Kids	Fromis 9	
2018	Vinxen	Minseo	
2019	**Tomorrow X Together**		
2019	**Itzy**		
2019	Hynn		
2019	X1		
2019	Cherry Bullet		

=== 2020s ===
Year^{[I]}	Winners and nominees	Ref.
2020	**Cravity**	
2020	**Weeekly**	
2020	Treasure	
2020	Cignature	
2020	MCND	
2021	**Lee Mu-jin**	
2021	**Aespa**	
2021	Enhypen	
2021	Jeon Gun-ho	
2021	KyoungSeo	
2021	STAYC	
2022	**Ive**	
2022	**NewJeans**	
2022	Billlie	
2022	Kep1er	
2022	Le Sserafim	
2022	Nmixx	
2023	**Zerobaseone**	
2023	**Riize**	
2023	Kiss of Life	
2023	Plave	
2023	BoyNextDoor	
2024	**Illit**	
2024	**TWS**	
2024	Babymonster	
2024	Meovv	
2024	Pagaehun	
2025	**AllDay Project**	
2025	**Hearts2Hearts**	
2025	JAESSBEE	
2025	KiiiKiii	
2025	Zo Zazz	
2026	**Alpha Drive One**	
2026	**Lngshot**	
2026	Hades	
2026	SYSTEM SEOUL	
2026	Tuide	

== Gallery ==
Award winners

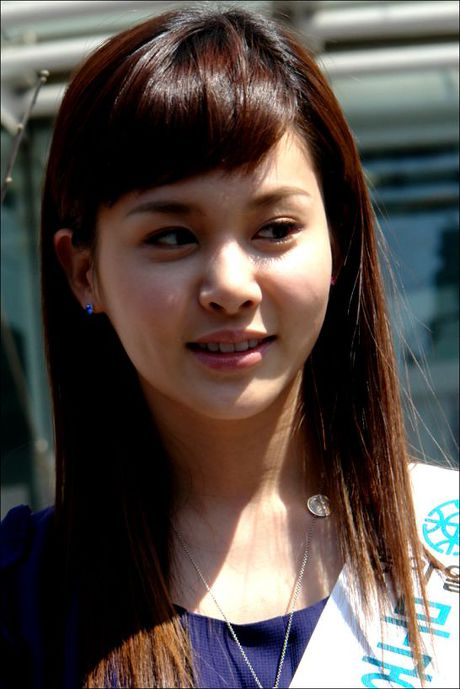
Ivy (2005)

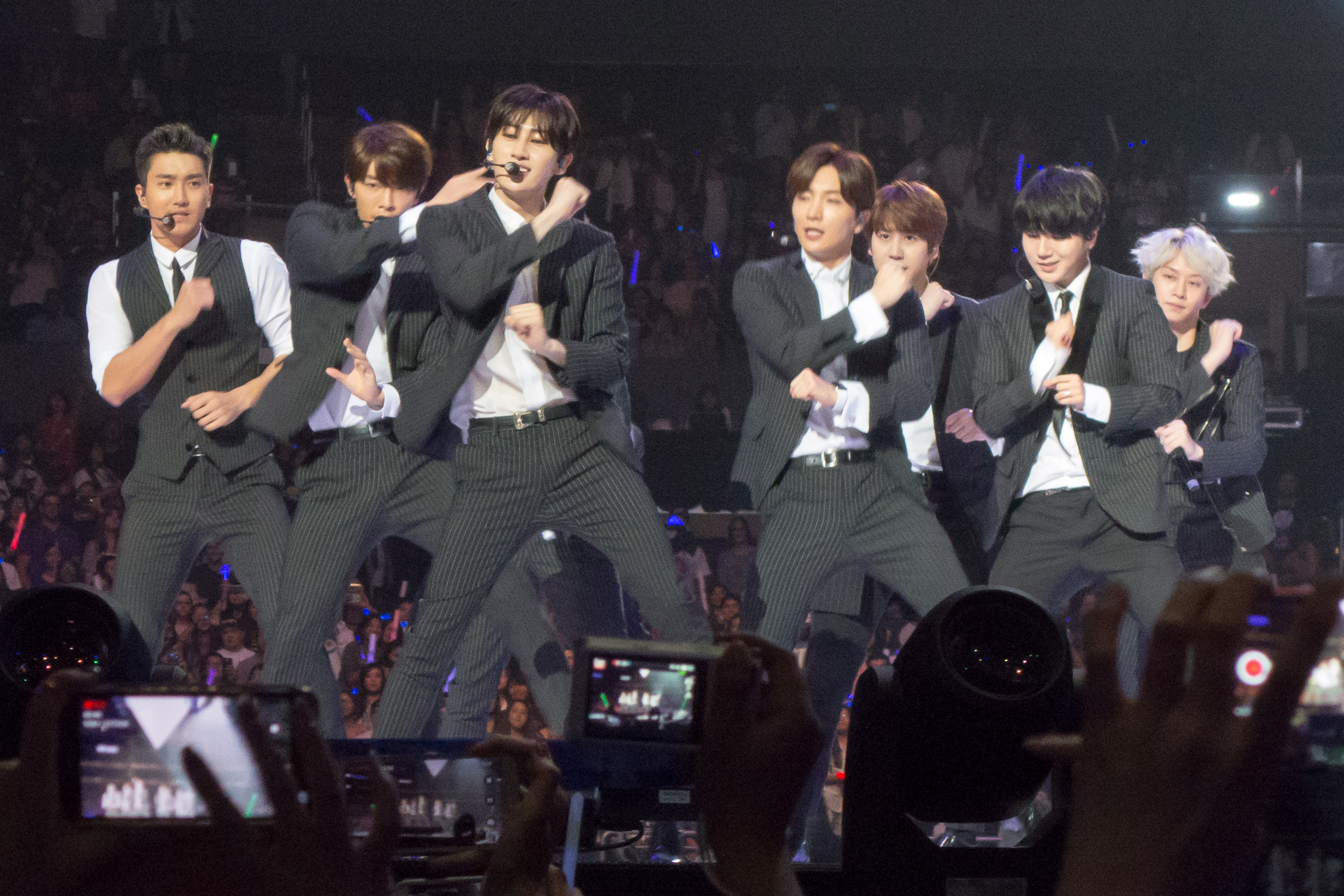
Super Junior (2006)

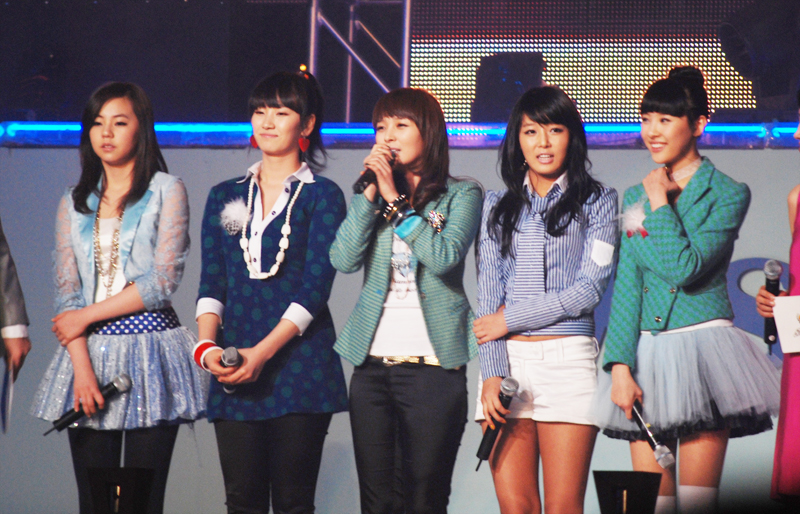
Wonder Girls (2007)

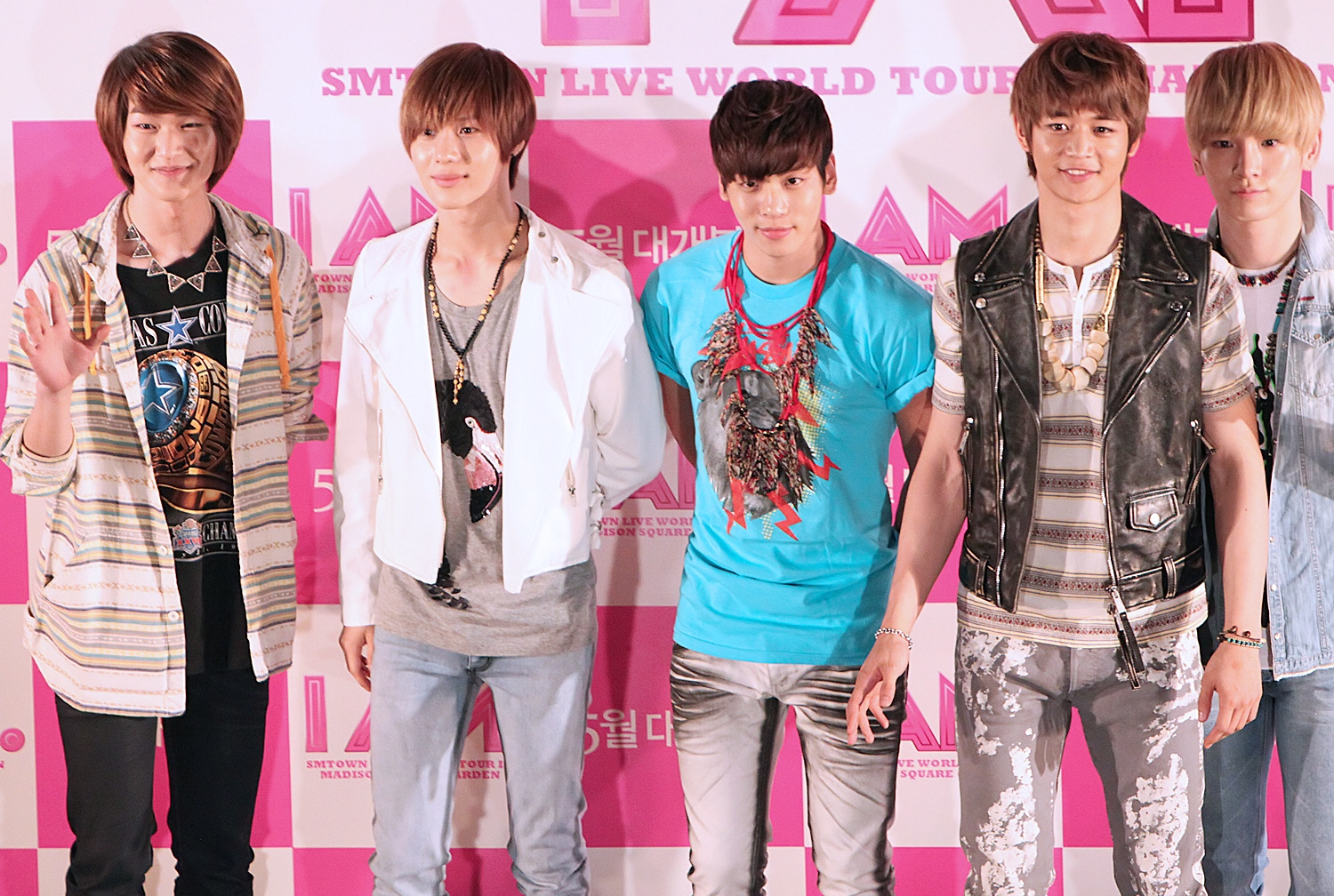
Shinee (2008)

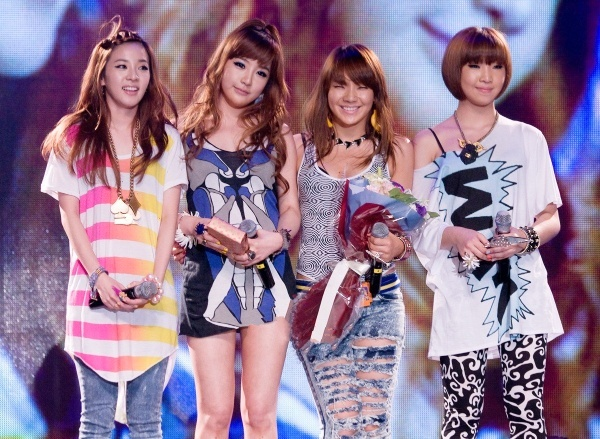
2NE1 (2009)

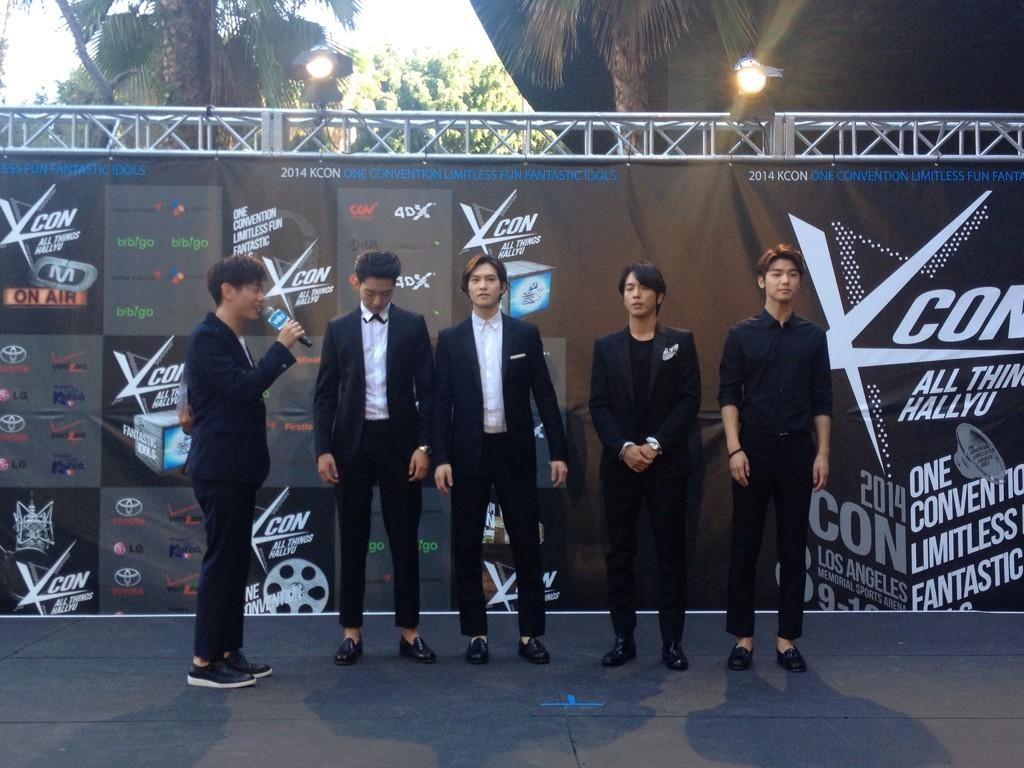
CNBLUE (2010)

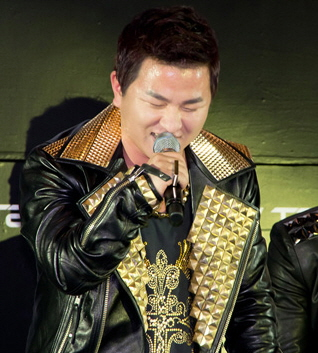
Huh Gak (2011)

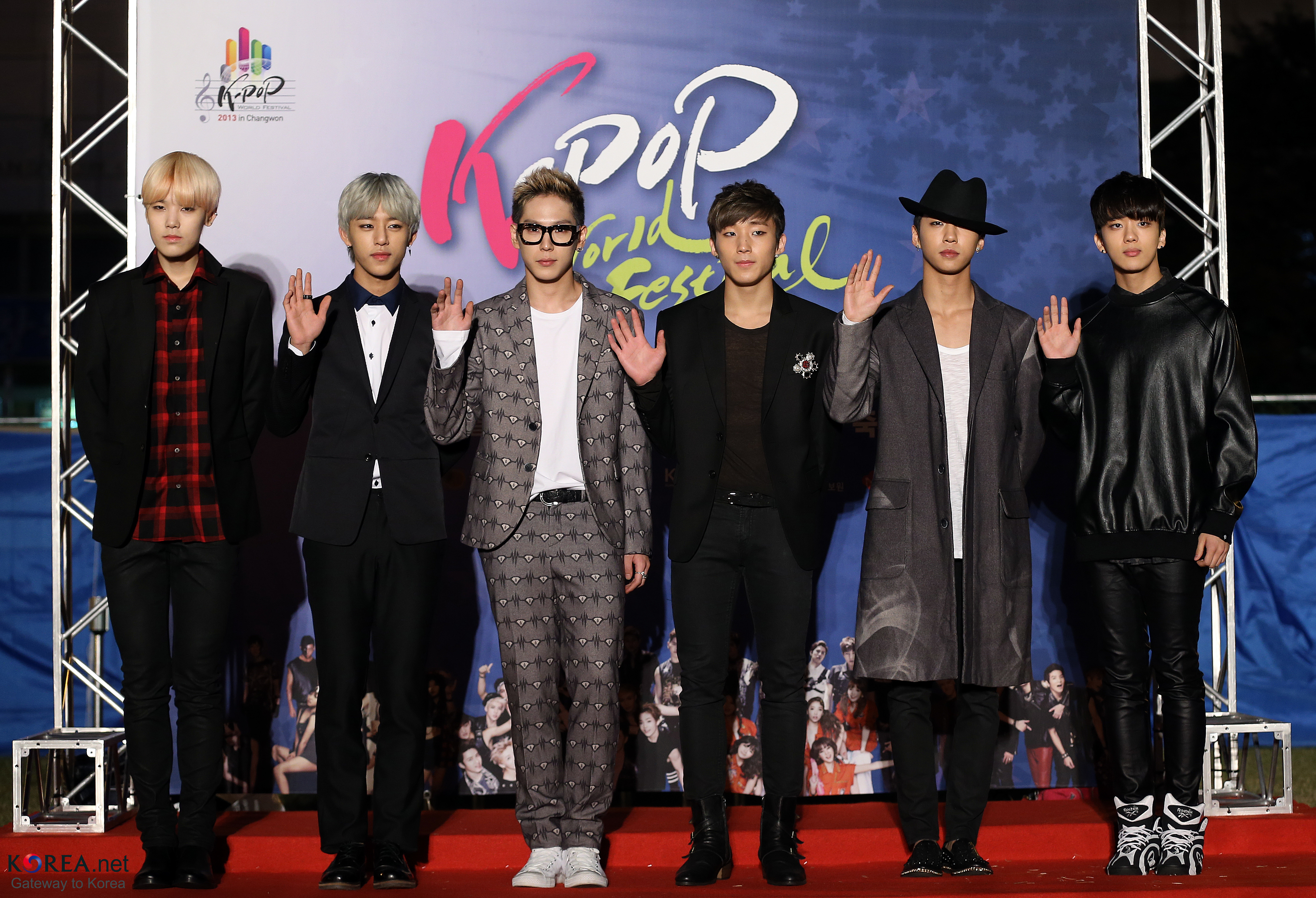
B.A.P (2012)

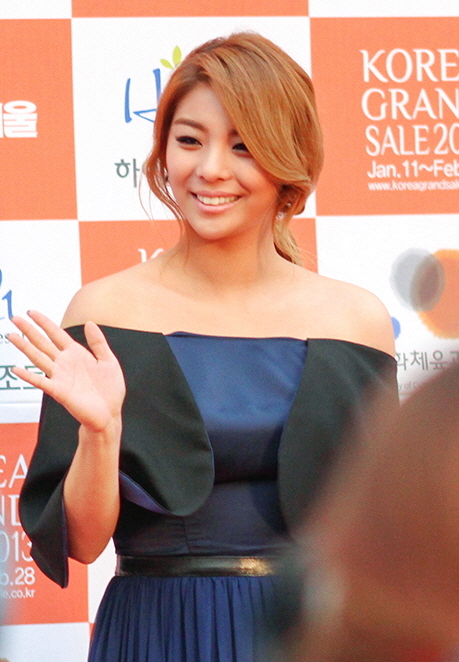
Ailee (2012)

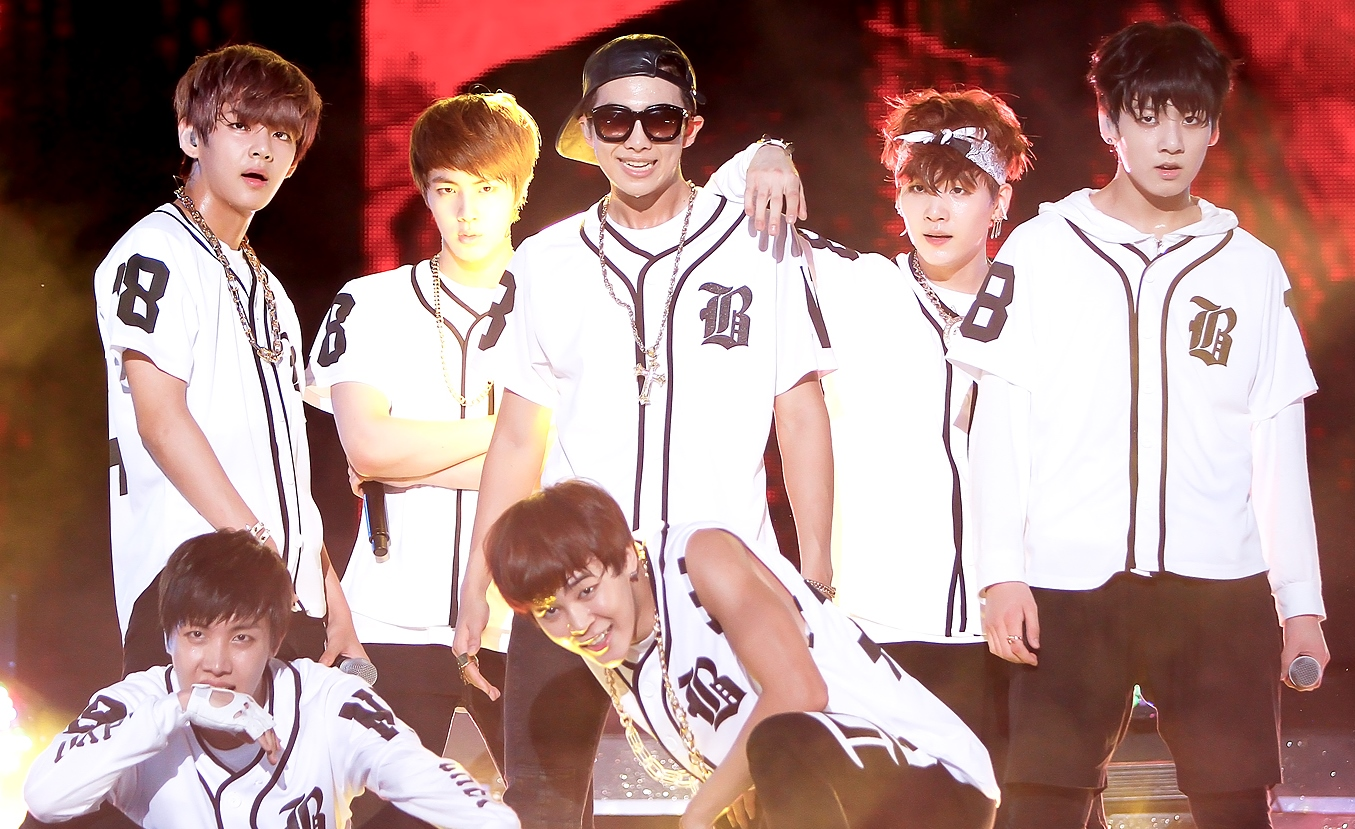
BTS (2013)

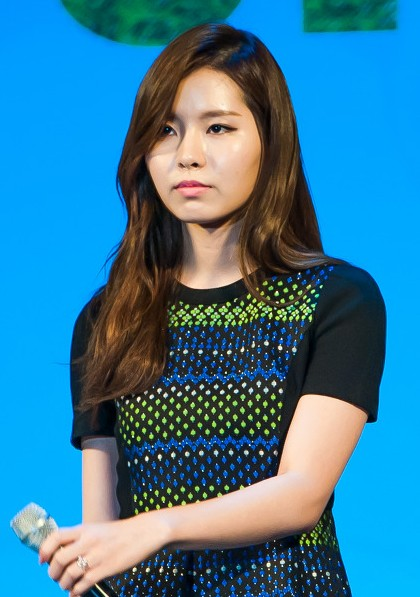
Lim Kim (2013)

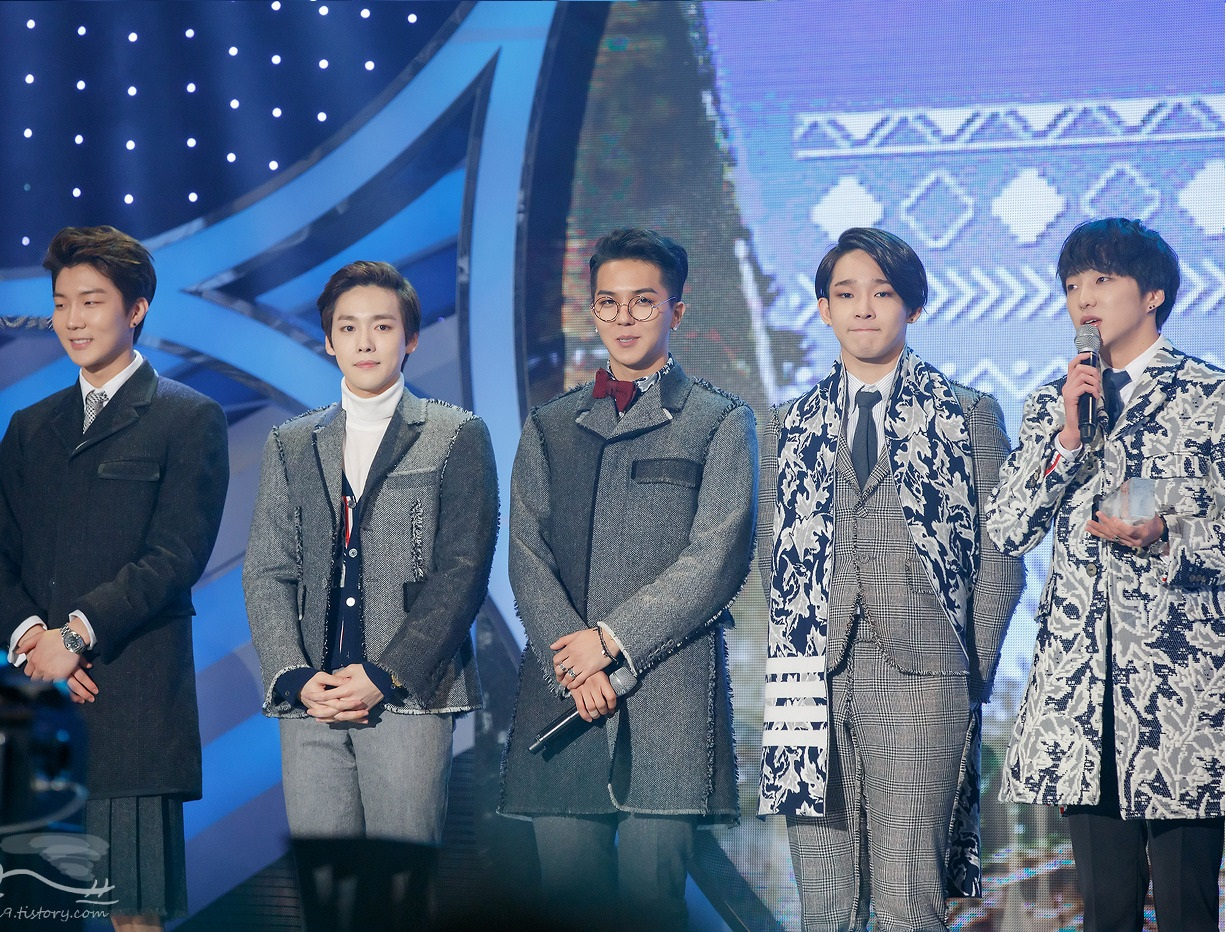
Winner (2014)

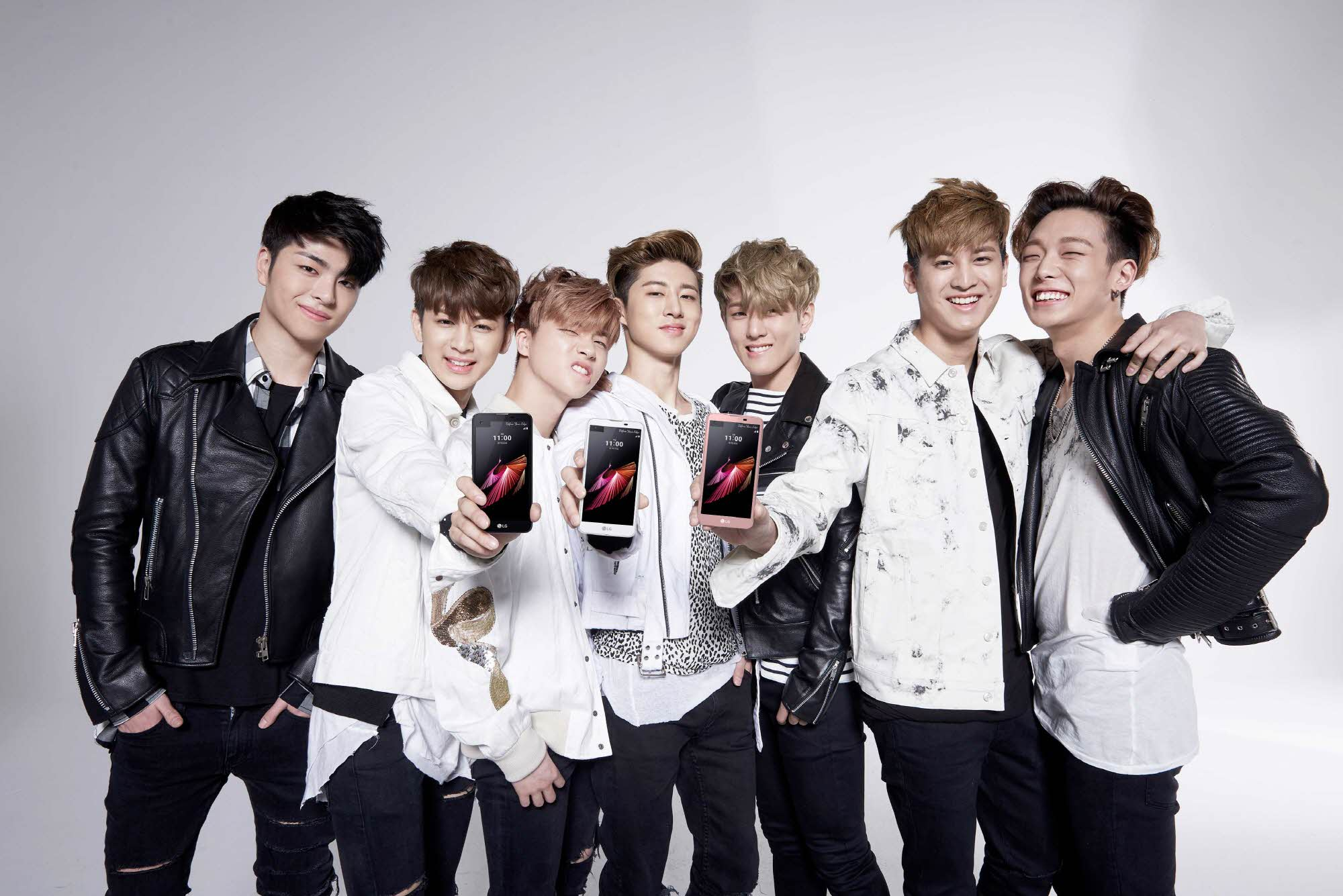
iKon (2015)

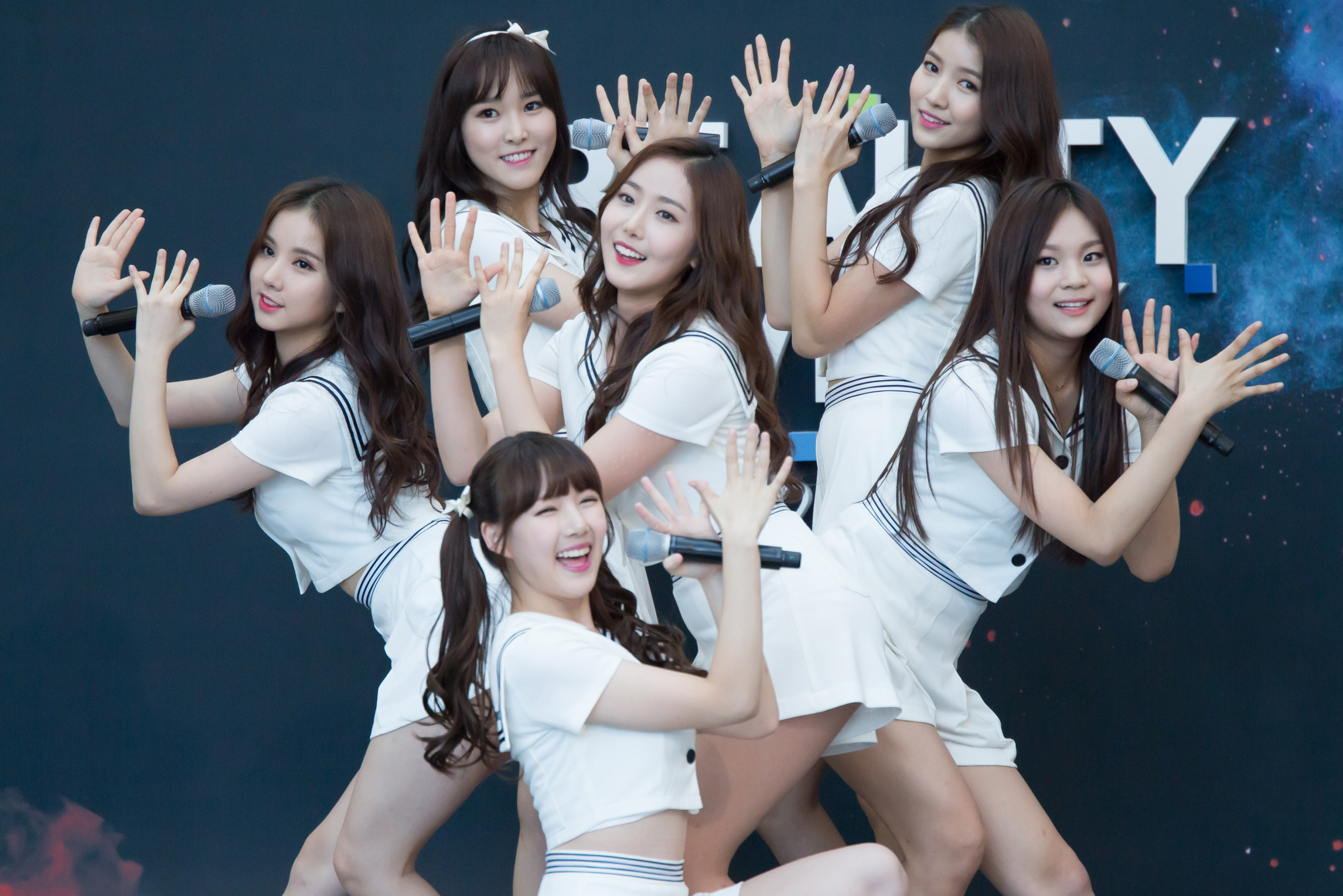
GFriend (2015)

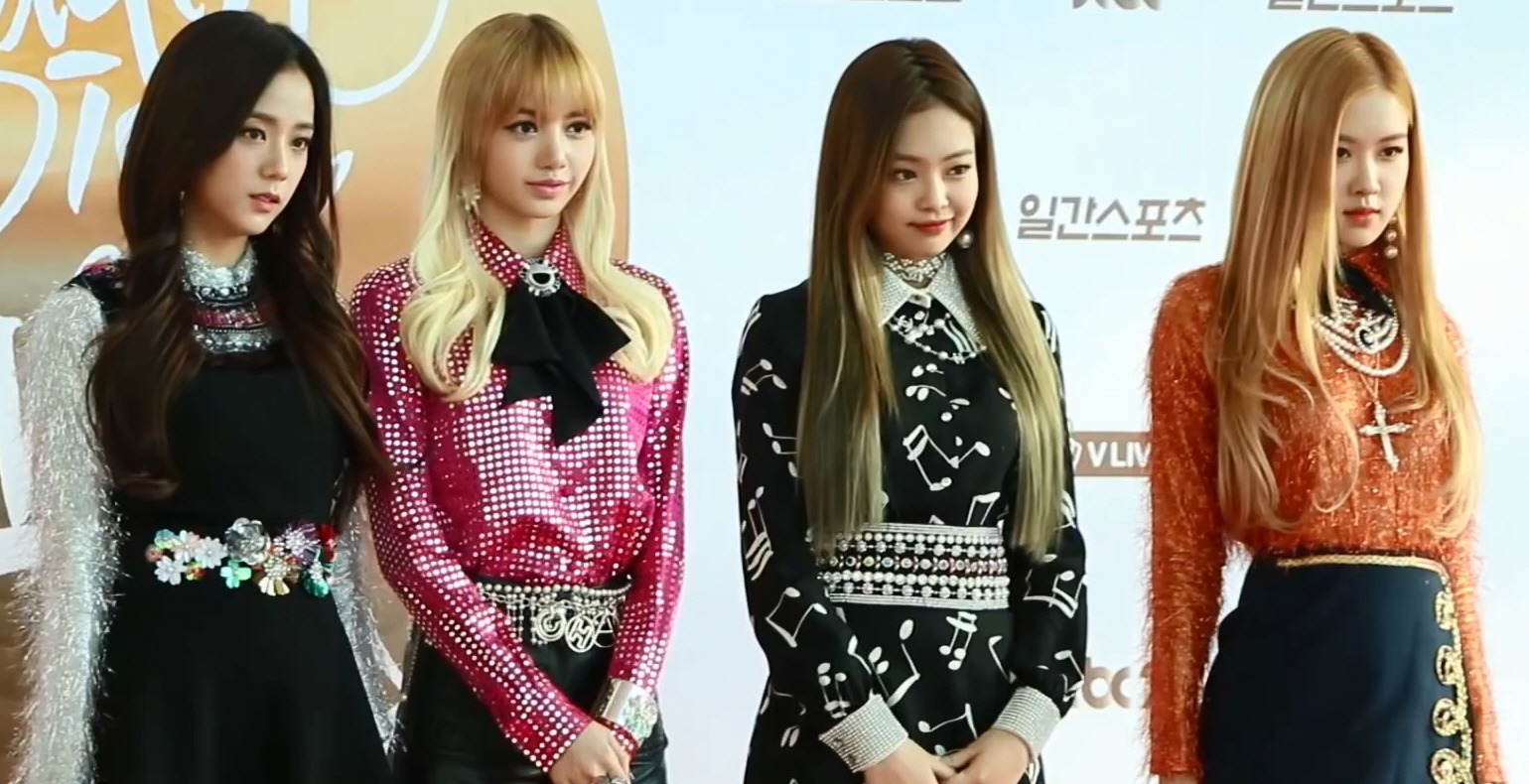
Blackpink (2016)

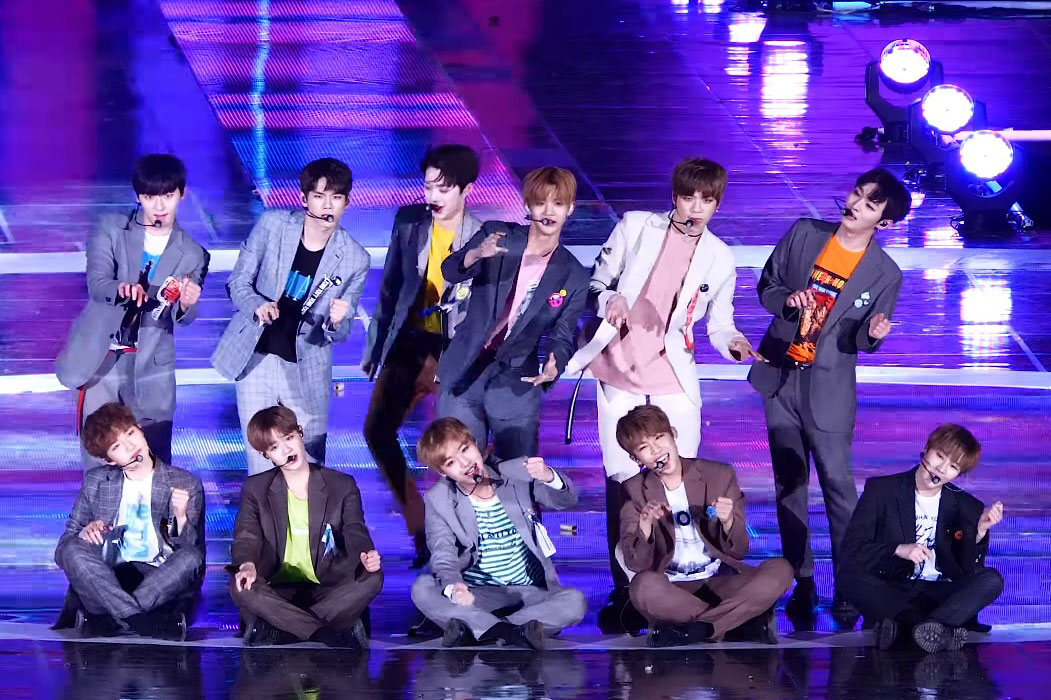
Wanna One (2017)

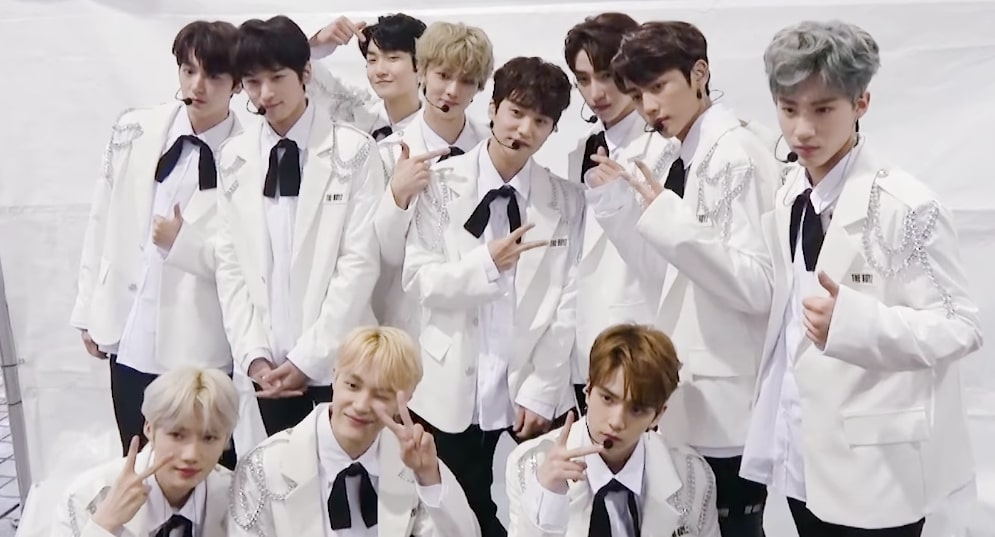
The Boyz (2018)

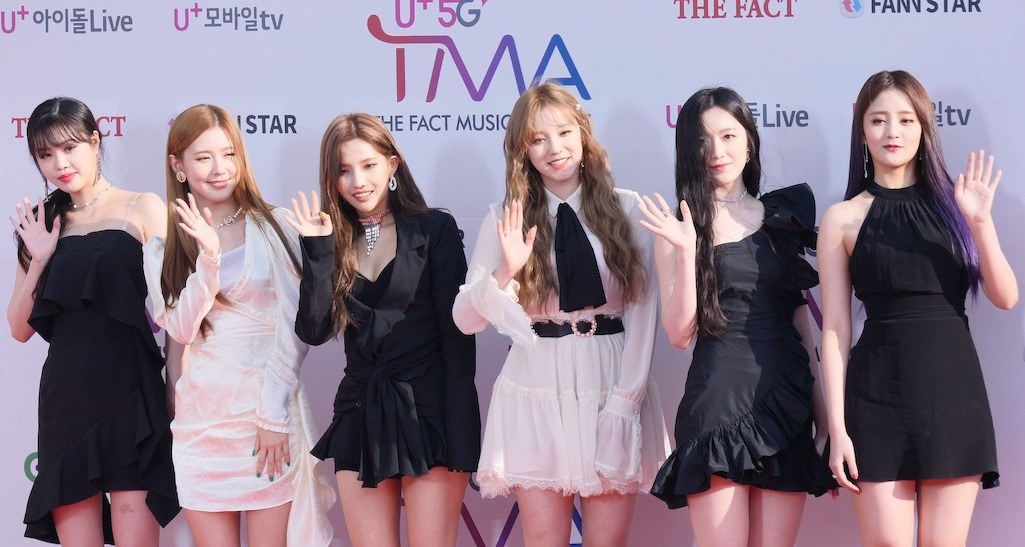
(G)I-dle (2018)

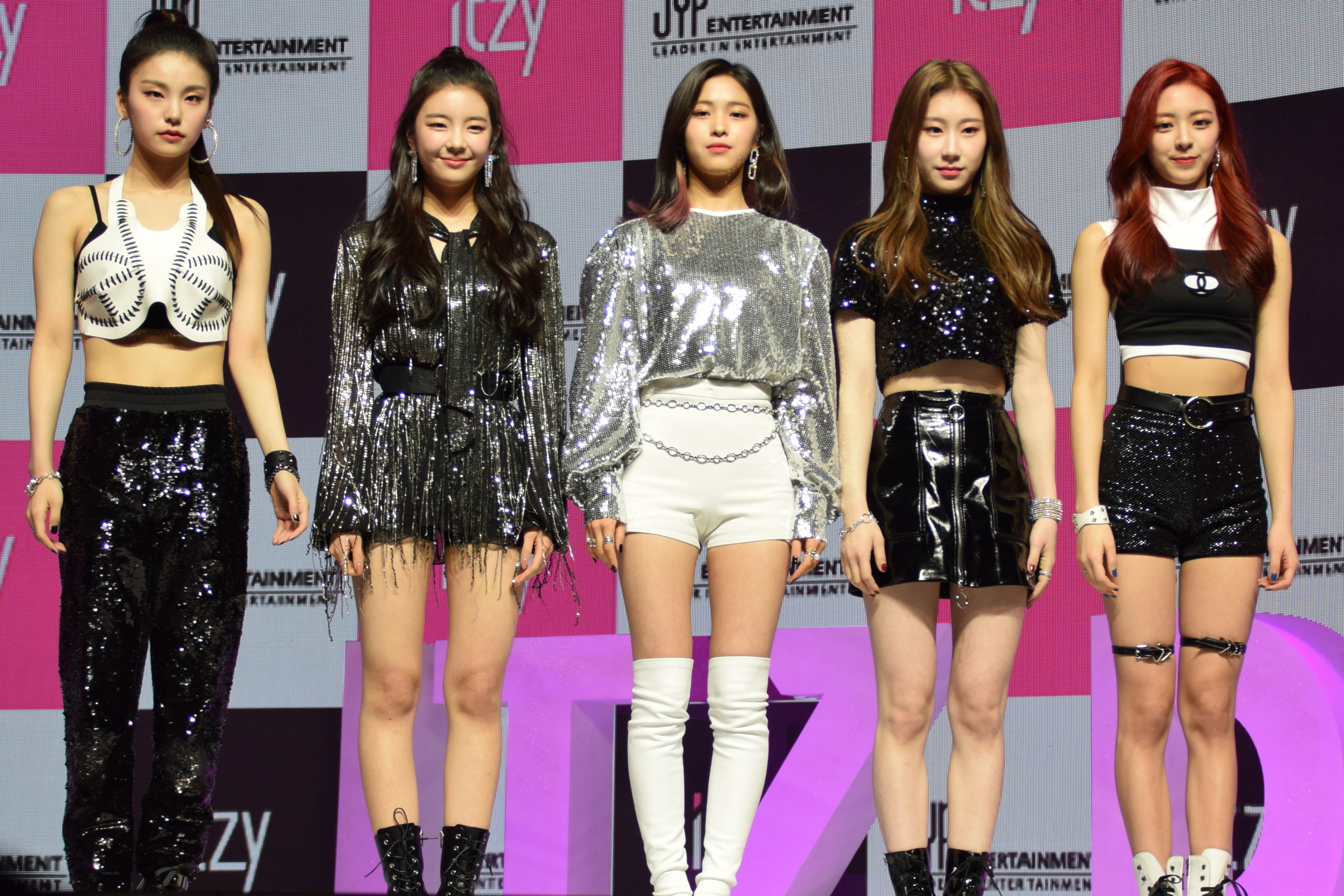
Itzy (2019)

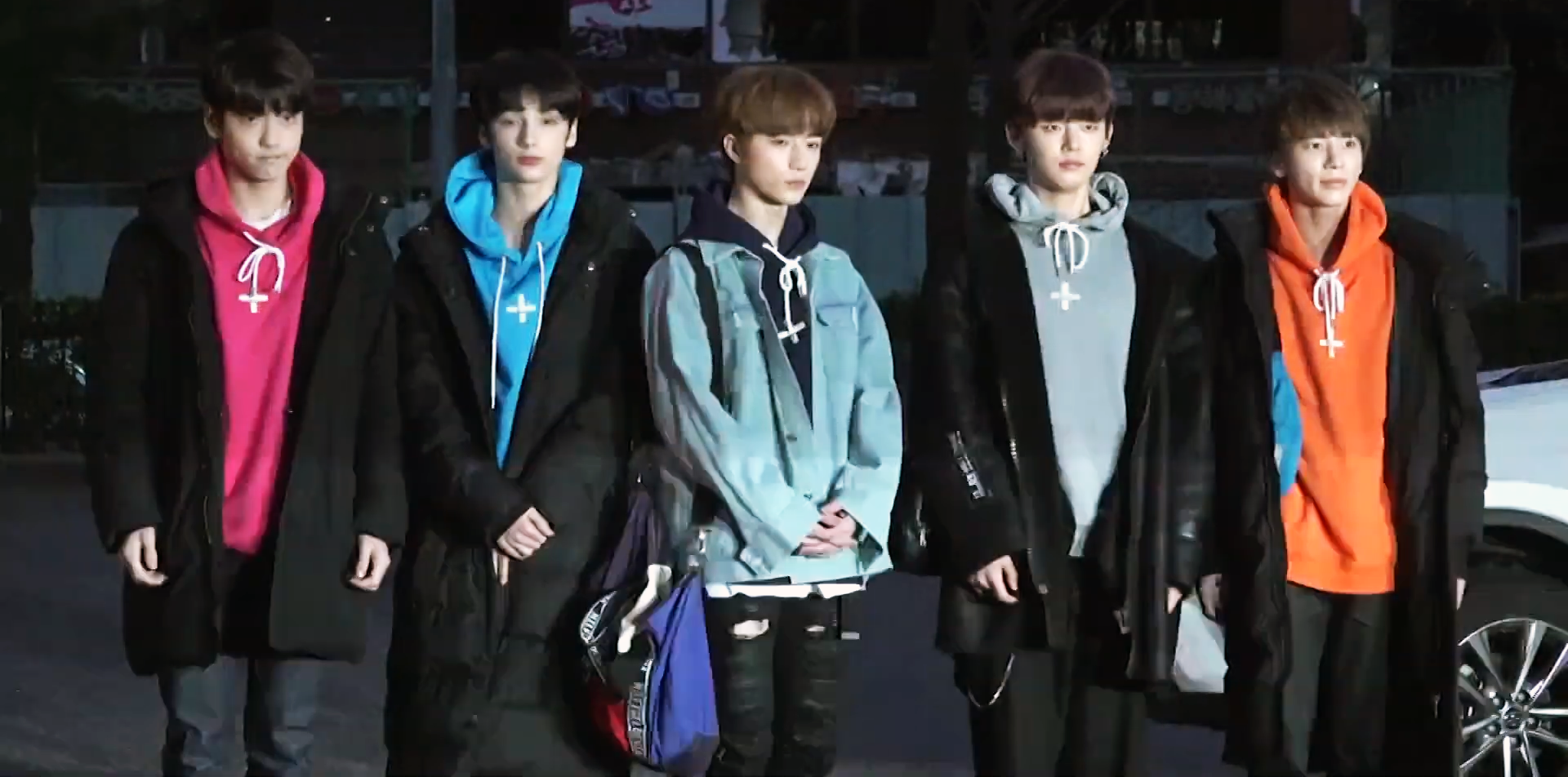
TXT (2019)

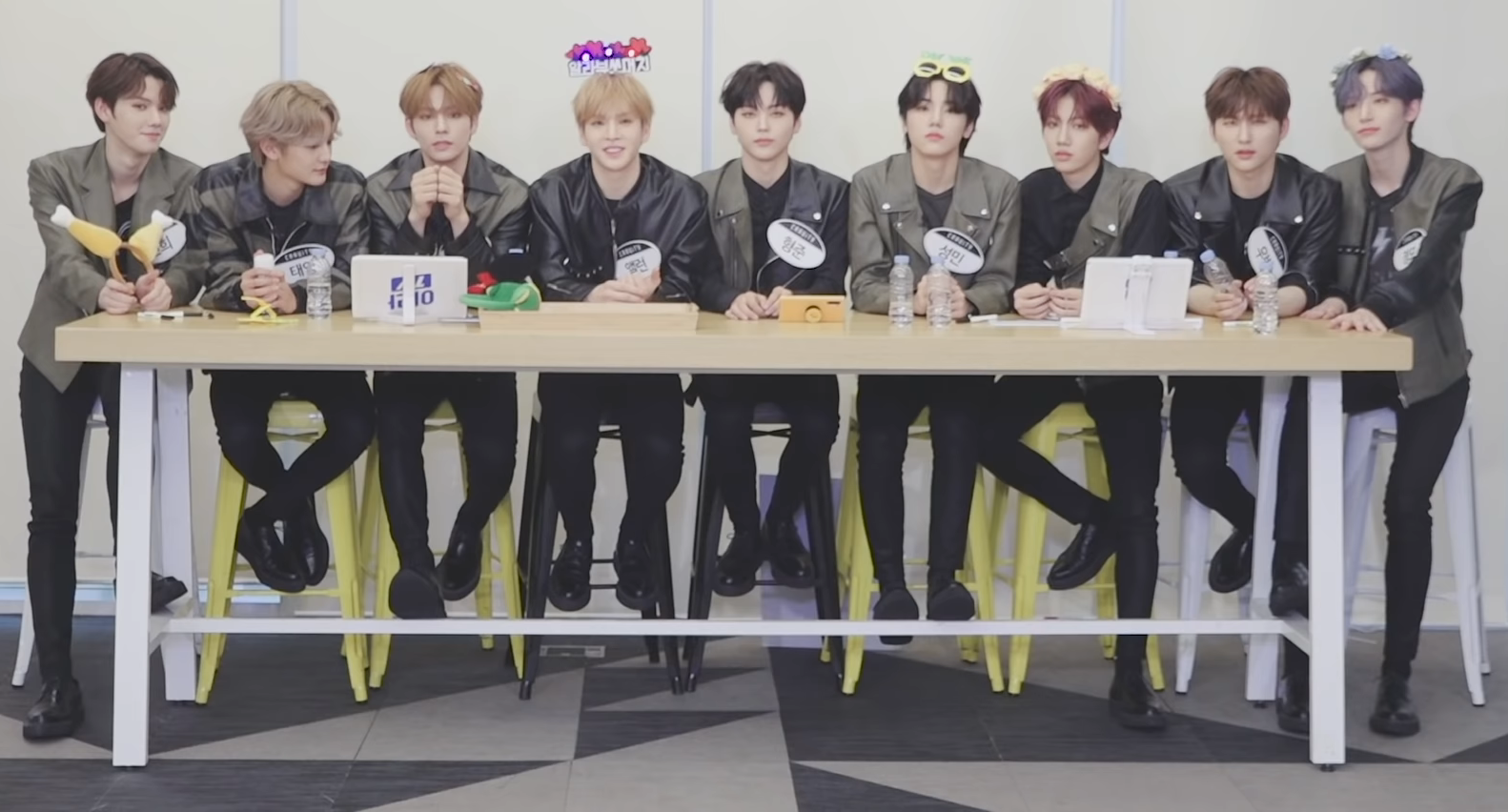
Cravity (2020)

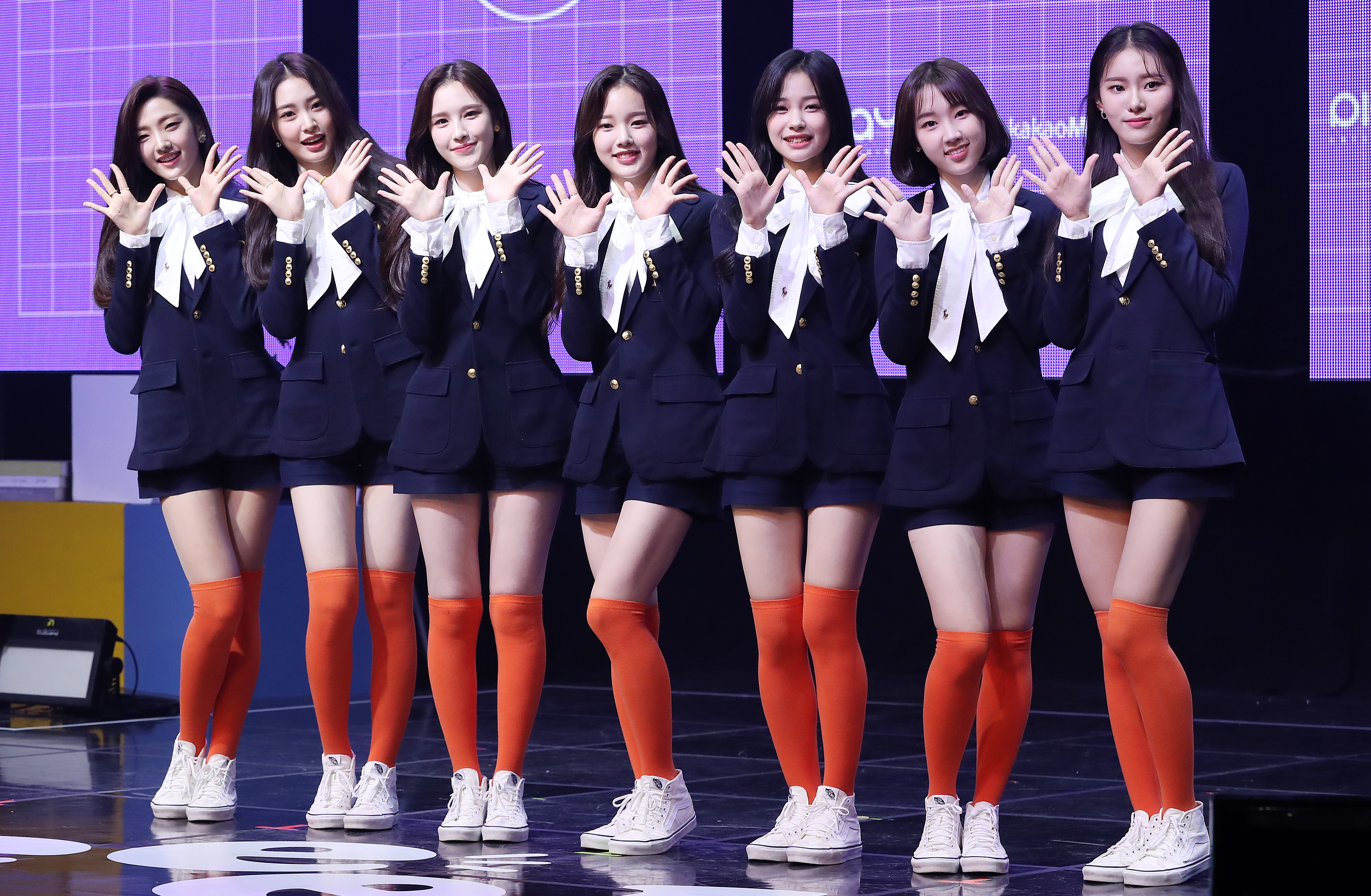
Weeekly (2020)

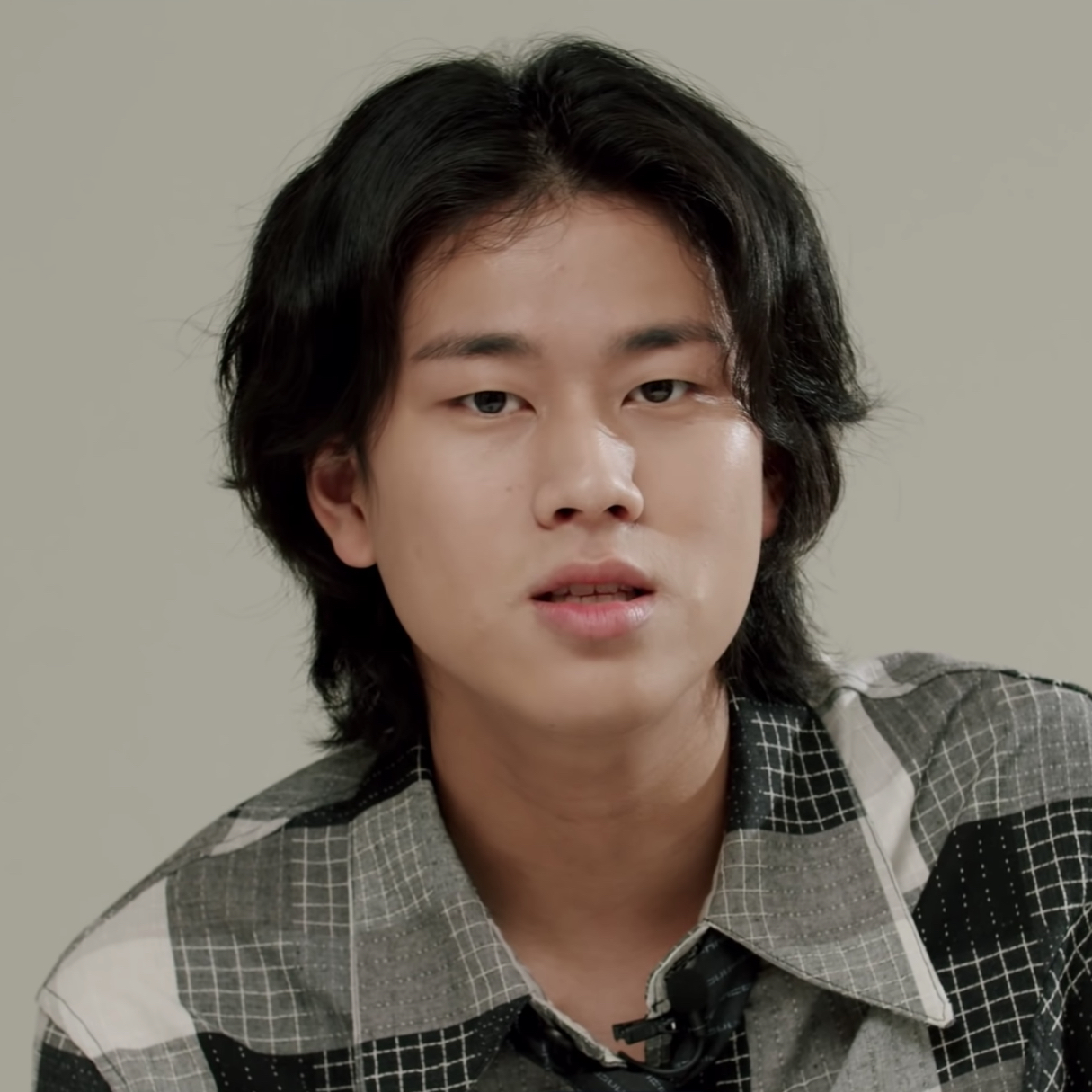
Lee Mu-jin (2021)

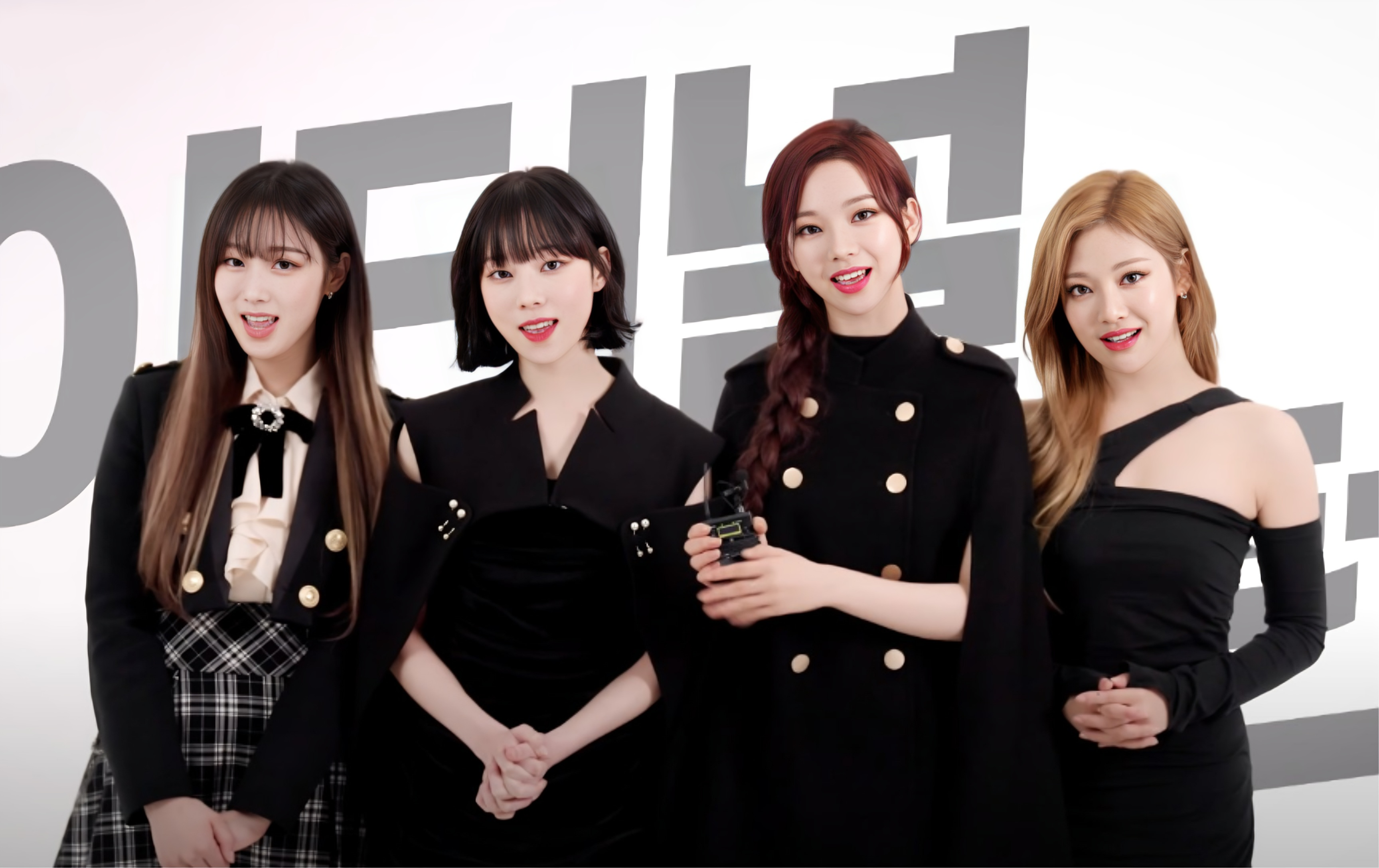
Aespa (2021)

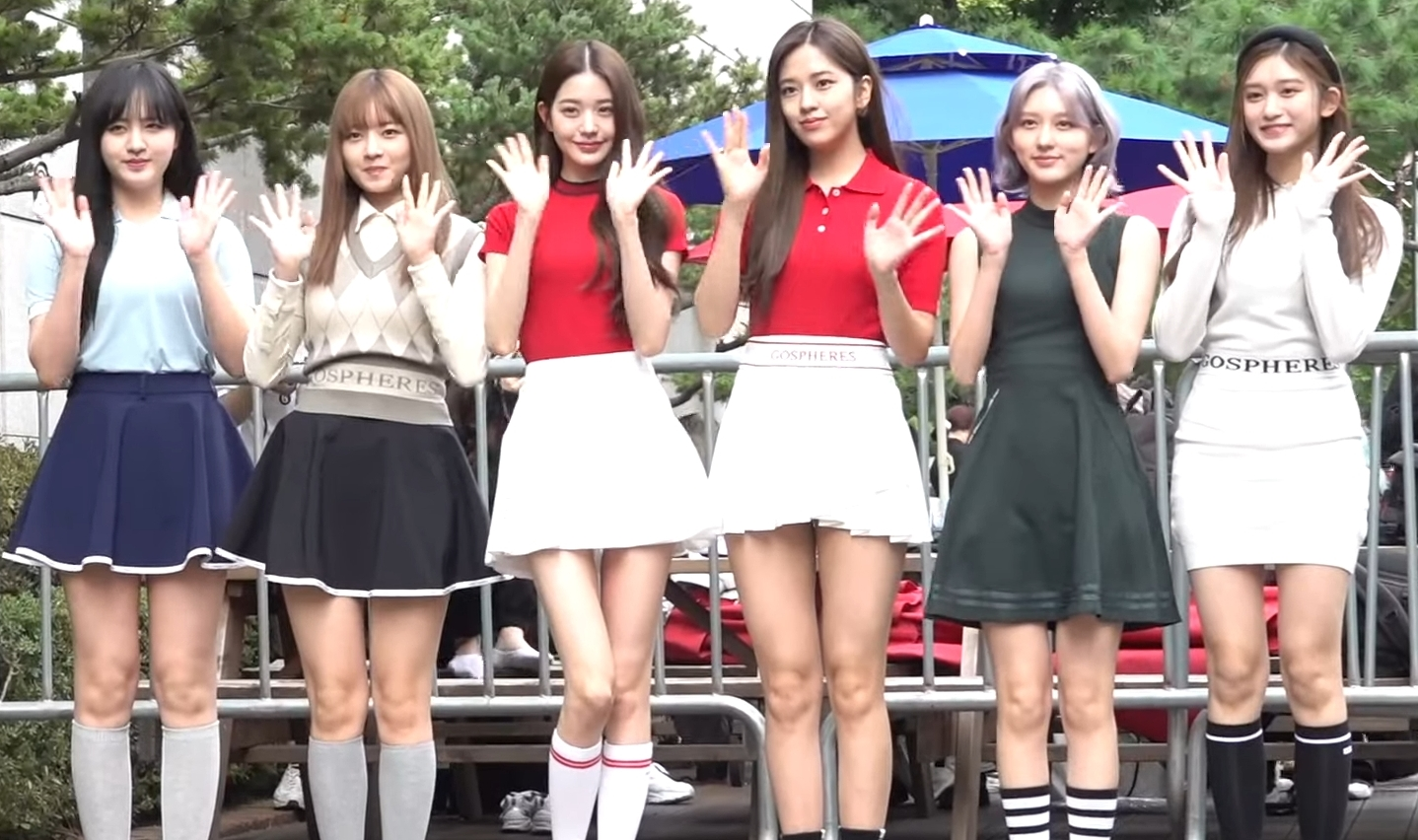
Ive (2022)

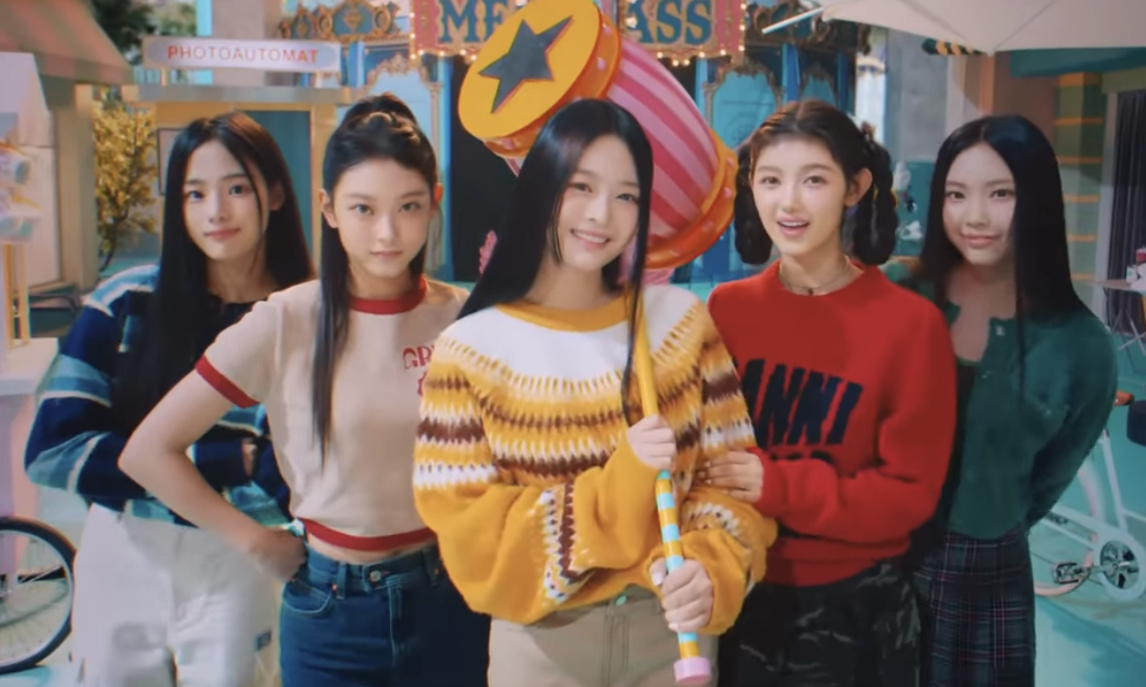
NewJeans (2022)
