= Plot Twist (TWS song) =

Single by TWS

from the EP Sparkling Blue
- Language: Korean
- Released: January 22, 2024
- Genre: K-pop; dance
- Length: 2:32
- Label: Pledis
- Composers: Wasurenai; Jeon Jin; Ohway!; Nmore; Heon Seo; BuildingOwner; Glenn; T-SK; SAEKI youthK
- Lyricists: Wasurenai; Brother Su; Jeon Jin; BuildingOwner; Glenn

TWS singles chronology
"Oh Mymy: 7s" (2024)	"Plot Twist" (2024)	"Hey! Hey!" (2024)

Music video
- "Plot Twist" on YouTube

"Plot Twist" (Korean: 첫 만남은 계획대로 되지 않아; RR: Cheon mannameun gyehoekdaero doeji ana; lit. 'The first meeting doesn't go as planned') is a song by South Korean boy group TWS. It was released on January 22, 2024, through Pledis Entertainment, as the second single and the lead track of the group's debut EP, Sparkling Blue. The song peaked at number two on the Circle Digital Chart.

== Background and release ==
After premiering the pre-release single "Oh Mymy: 7s" and its music video on January 2, 2024, several teasers and activities, including a highlight medley, a product endorsement deal with Lotte Chilsung's Milkis, and cover features on Japanese magazines Ray and ViVi, were revealed to promote and build anticipation for TWS' first EP. With the release of Sparkling Blue and its lead single "Plot Twist" on January 22, TWS became the first boy group to debut under Pledis Entertainment in nine years, following the launch of Seventeen in 2015.

On the same day of its release, TWS performed "Plot Twist", together with the tracks "Oh Mymy: 7s", "Unplugged Boy", and "BFF", for the first time on the group's global debut program TWS: Debut Show on Mnet. The show was simultaneously broadcast on the Mnet, M2, and Hybe Labels channels on YouTube.

== Composition ==
I love our lead single because I think it captures the flutters of the heart and the nervousness of the "first encounter" that we all experience at one point or another.

— TWS member Hanjin on the song's meaning, Bandwagon Asia

In an effort to define the group's musical identity, TWS planned to showcase their own unique genre, which they have defined to be "boyhood pop". Characterized by a "refreshing vibe" and its combined use of drum, guitar, and synth sounds, "Plot Twist" has been noted to embody the "thrill of a first encounter", in reference to the meaning of the song's Korean title 첫 만남은 계획대로 되지 않아, which translates to "first encounters don't go as planned".

== Music video ==
The official music video was simultaneously released with "Plot Twist" on January 22, 2024. It depicted scenes of the TWS members experiencing feelings of excitement and nervousness as they navigate through their first day of school. On January 30, a performance video of the song was released.

== Critical reception ==
Jeff Benjamin ranked "Plot Twist" at number three on Billboard's mid-year list of 2024's 20 best K-Pop songs, praising the single for its "unexpected but dynamic turns within the production" and lauding it as "a sonic adventure" that "hook[s] listeners from the first note to the anthemic chant that closes the track". Paste's Kayti Burt complimented the track for its relatable lyrics and "shiny" production, recognizing the song to be "an endearing official introduction" for the group, as well as "one of the [K-pop] industry's biggest hits of the year". Writing for Osen, Kyung Jimin commented that the song gave "a pleasant feeling", summarizing it as "a story of overcoming the vagueness encountered in the excitement of a first encounter, with anticipation for the bright days ahead together".

=== Listicles ===
Critics' year-end rankings of "Plot Twist"
Publisher	Listicle	Rank	Ref.
Dazed	The 50 best K-pop tracks of 2024	—N/a	
NME	The 25 best K-pop songs of 2024	22	
Paste	The 20 Best K-Pop Songs of 2024	6	
Teen Vogue	The Best K-pop Songs of 2024, According to K-pop Songwriters	—N/a	

== Commercial performance ==
In South Korea, "Plot Twist" peaked at number two on the Circle Digital Chart for the week of March 3–9, 2024. Having performed consistently well on domestic music services such as Melon, Bugs, and Spotify, the song was recognized for its success and easy-listening nature, eliciting commentary on the general difficulty of boy groups climbing major South Korean music charts due to their preference for more intense genres. Despite never topping the weekly or monthly charts, the song ranked first on the Circle Digital Chart for the first half of 2024.

== Accolades ==
"Plot Twist" won five music program awards in South Korea.

Awards and nominations for "Plot Twist"
Award ceremony	Year	Category	Result	Ref.
MAMA Awards	2024	Best Dance Performance Male Group	Won	
Melon Music Awards	2024	Song of the Year	Nominated	

Music program awards for "Plot Twist"
Program	Date	Ref.
Inkigayo	March 24, 2024	
Music Bank	February 23, 2024	
Show Champion	February 14, 2024	
Show Champion	February 21, 2024	
The Show	February 20, 2024	

== Charts ==
=== Weekly charts ===
Weekly chart performance
Chart (2024)	Peak position
Global 200 (Billboard)	123
Japan Streaming (Billboard Japan)	89
South Korea (Circle)	2

=== Monthly charts ===
Monthly chart performance
Chart (2024)	Position
South Korea (Circle)	2

=== Year-end charts ===
Year-end chart performance
Chart	Year	Position
South Korea (Circle)	2024	2
South Korea (Circle)	2025	42

== Certifications ==
Certifications
Region	Certification	Certified units/sales
Streaming
Japan (RIAJ)	Gold	50,000,000^{†}
South Korea (KMCA)	Platinum	100,000,000^{†}
^{†} Streaming-only figures based on certification alone.
