= Sparkling Blue =

- Digital cover

EP by TWS
- Released: January 22, 2024
- Genre: K-pop
- Length: 15:04
- Language: Korean; English
- Label: Pledis

TWS chronology
Sparkling Blue (2024)	Summer Beat! (2024)

Singles from Sparkling Blue
- 1. "Oh Mymy: 7s" Released: January 3, 2024; 2. "Plot Twist" Released: January 22, 2024

Sparkling Blue is the debut extended play (EP) by South Korean boy band TWS, released on January 22, 2024, through Pledis Entertainment. It was promoted by the singles "Oh Mymy: 7s" and "Plot Twist". It debuted atop the Circle Album Chart and at number three of the Japanese Oricon Albums Chart.

== Background and release ==
In January 2024, Pledis Entertainment proceeded with their plans to launch TWS, the entertainment label's first boy group in nine years, since Seventeen's debut in 2015. The music video for the song "Oh Mymy: 7s" served as the first preview for TWS' EP a few days before its official release. Several teasers and activities, including a highlight medley, a product endorsement deal with Lotte Chilsung's Milkis, and cover features on Japanese magazines Ray and ViVi, were also revealed to promote and build anticipation for TWS' first EP.

On January 22, 2024, Sparkling Blue, a five-track EP that embodied the sound of "boyhood pop", was released alongside the music video for its lead single "Plot Twist".

== Critical reception ==
Writing for Osen, Kyung Jimin commented that the EP was "impressive", remarking on its natural and friendly musical tone and likening it to "a conversation with friends during break time". IZM's Han Seonghyeon scored Sparkling Blue three out of five stars, commenting that although the quality of the EP was decent, its title track "Plot Twist" overshadowed the rest of its tracks due to the album prioritizing achieving a "consistent mood" as a goal.

== Commercial performance ==
Sparkling Blue debuted at number one on the South Korean Circle Album Chart, where it sold 237,606 copies in its first week. The EP also debuted at number three on the Japanese Oricon Albums Chart and number four on the Billboard Japan Hot Albums chart. In the United States, Sparkling Blue opened at number eight on the Heatseekers Albums chart and number 32 on the Top Album Sales chart.

== Track listing ==
Sparkling Blue track listing
No.	Title	Lyrics	Music	Arrangement	Length
1.	"Plot Twist" (Korean: 첫 만남은 계획대로 되지 않아; RR: cheot mannameun gyehoekdaero dwiji anha; lit. The First Meeting Is Not Going to Go as Planned)	Wasurenai; Brother Su; Jeon Jin; BuildingOwner; Glenn	Wasurenai; Jeon; Ohway!; Nmore; Heon Seo; BuildingOwner; Glenn; T-SK; Saeki YouthK (RzC)	Wasurenai; Jeon; Nmore; BuildingOwner; Ohway!	2:32
2.	"Unplugged Boy"	Louise Udin; Adam Von Mentzer	Jeon; BuildingOwner; Heon; Von Mentzer	Jeon; BuildingOwner; Von Mentzer	3:08
3.	"First Hooky"	Kim Min-jeong (Jam Factory); Hwang Hye-rim (Jam Factory); Im Su-ran	Andreas Öberg; Sqvare; William Weeks	Öberg; Sqvare; Weeks	3:29
4.	"BFF"	Cha Yu-bin (XYXX); Mia; Bay (153/Joombas); Shannon; Max Ulver	Nmore; Ulver; Birsday; Park Ki-tae	Nmore; Birsday	2:46
5.	"Oh Mymy: 7s"	Wasurenai; Shannon; Jeon; Haon; Glenn	Wasurenai; Believve; Shannon	Wasurenai; Believve	3:09
Total length:					15:04

== Charts ==
=== Weekly charts ===
Weekly chart performance
Chart (2024)	Peak position
Belgian Albums (Ultratop Flanders)	80
Japanese Albums (Oricon)	3
Japanese Hot Albums (Billboard Japan)	4
South Korean Albums (Circle)	1
US Heatseekers Albums (Billboard)	8
US Top Album Sales (Billboard)	16
US World Albums (Billboard)	6

Chart (2026)	Peak position
Greek Albums (IFPI)	24

=== Monthly charts ===
Monthly chart performance
Chart (2024)	Peak position
Japanese Albums (Oricon)	10
South Korean Albums (Circle)	5

=== Year-end charts ===
Year-end chart performance
Chart (2024)	Position
Japanese Albums (Oricon)	90
Japanese Hot Albums (Billboard Japan)	96
South Korean Albums (Circle)	57

== Certifications and sales ==
Certifications and sales
Region	Certification	Certified units/sales
South Korea (KMCA)	Platinum	250,000^{^}
^{^} Shipments figures based on certification alone.

== Release history ==
Release history
Region	Date	Format	Label
South Korea	January 22, 2024	CD	Pledis
Various	January 22, 2024	Digital download; streaming	Pledis
