= List of songs recorded by Ive =

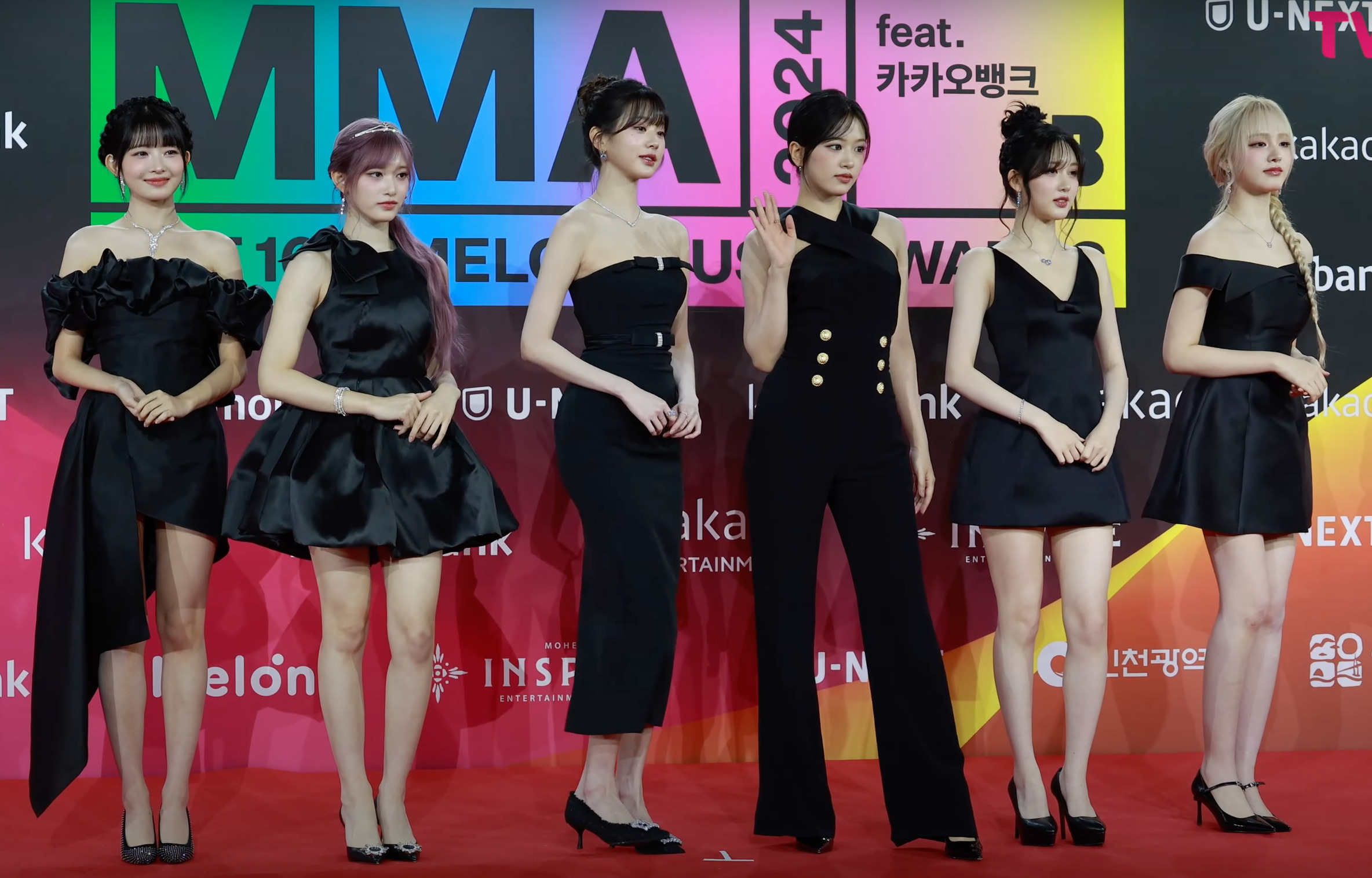
Ive in 2024 at the 2024 Melon Music Awards

The following is a list of songs recorded by South Korean girl group Ive. As of February 2026, the girl group has officially released 74 songs. 55 songs are originally recorded in Korean, 7 songs are originally recorded in Japanese, 2 songs are originally recorded in English, and 10 are Japanese versions of their Korean songs.

The group is composed of six members: Gaeul, Yujin, Rei, Wonyoung, Liz, and Leeseo, was formed by Starship Entertainment in 2021.

Key
†	Indicates a single release

== Songs originally recorded in Korean ==
List of songs, showing year released, lyricist, composer, arranger, and originating album
Song	Year	Lyricist(s)	Composer(s)	Arranger(s)	Album	Ref.
"♥ Beats"	2025	Seo Jeong-ah	Adam Kapit; 1-800-Rudeboy; Gabi Gotts; MLite	Adam Kampit	Ive Secret	
"8" (Note: "8" is a solo song by Jang Won-young)	2026	Jang Won-young	Simon Klose; Arineh Karimi; MLite	Simon Klose	Revive+	
"Accendio" (Note: "Accendio" Japanese version was released in 2025.)†	2024	Gaeko; Seo Jeong-ah; Seo Ji-eum	Ryan S. Jhun; Christopher Smith; Alexis Andrea Boyd; Lise Sofie Reppe; Benjamin Samama; Jack Brady; Jordan Roman	Ryan S. Jhun; Risc; The Wavys	I've Switch	
"After Like" (Note: "After Like" Japanese version was released in 2023.) †	2022	Seo Ji-eum; Mommy Son; Rei	Ryan S. Jhun; Anders Nilsen; André Jensen; Iselin Solheim	Ryan S. Jhun; Anders Nilsen; Avin; Slay	After Like	
"Attitude" †	2025	Seo Ji-eum; Nietzche; Jang Won-young	James Lewis; Ryan S. Jhun; Suzanne Vega; Roland Spreckley; Olga Sundin; Lotte Mørkved	Ryan S. Jhun; James Lewis	Ive Empathy	
"Baddie" (Note: "Baddie" Japanese version was released in 2024.) †	2023	Big Naughty; Perrie; Ryan S. Jhun	Ryan S. Jhun; Christopher Smith; Fin Dow-Smith; Lauren Aquilina	Ryan S. Jhun; Fin Dow-Smith; Risc; Alawn	I've Mine	
"Bang Bang" †	2026	Seo Ji-eum; Hwang Yu-bin (XYXX); Jang Won-young; Exy	Jack Brady; Jordan Roman; Kristin Carpenter; Sarah Troy; MLite	The Wavys	Revive+	
"Blackhole" †	2026	Seo Ji-eum; Hwang Yu-bin (XYXX)	Lee Chae-heon; Sophie Rose; Sarah Troy; Kristin Carpenter; MLite	Lee Chae-heon; Ido Nadjar	Revive+	
"Blue Blood"	2023	Seo Ji-eum	Nick Hahn; Sophia Brenan; Elle Campbell	Nick Hahn	I've Ive	
"Blue Heart" (Note: "Blue Heart" Japanese version was released in 2025.)	2024	Jang Won-young	Ryan S. Jhun; Max Thulin; Louise Udin; Mathilde Clara Nyegaard	Ryan S. Jhun; Max Thulin	I've Switch	
"Cherish"	2023	Lee Seu-ran	Ryan S. Jhun; Sofia Quinn; Dewain Whitmore Jr. Louis Schoorl	Ryan S. Jhun; Louis Schoorl	I've Ive	
"Dear My Feelings"	2025	Jinooya	Melanie Fontana; Lindgren; GG Ramirez; Lena Leon; A-Dee	Lindgren; A-Dee	Ive Secret	
"Either Way" †	2023	Sunwoo Jung-a	Ryan S. Jhun; Luke Fitton; Lauren Aquilina; Liam O'Donnell	Ryan S. Jhun; Luke Fitton	I've Mine	
"Eleven" (Note: "Eleven" Japanese version was released in 2022.) †	2021	Seo Ji-eum	Peter Rycroft; Lauren Aquilina; Ryan S. Jhun	Lostboy; Ryan S. Jhun; Alawn	Eleven	
"Fireworks"	2026	Seo Jeong-ah	Audun Agnar Gulbranden; Gucci Caliente; Ido Nadjar; Mathilde Nyegaard; Lauren Aquilina; MLite	Audun Agnar Gulbranden; Gucci Caliente	Revive+	
"Flu"	2025	Hwang Yu-bin (XYXX)	Kim Ju-hyeong; Nok; Ryan S. Jhun; Maria Marcus; Christian Fast	Kim Ju-hyeong; Nok; Ryan S. Jhun	Ive Empathy	
"Force" (Note: "Force" is a solo song by An Yu-jin)	2026	Kim Hye-i (Artiffect)	Dwayne Abernathy Jr. Jazelle Rodriguez; Ido Nadjar; MLite	Dem Jointz; Ido Nadjar	Revive+	
"Gotcha (Baddest Eros)"	2025	Hwang Ha-ha (Full8loom)	Mike Gonek; Cameron Hunter; Sophie Powers; MLite	Mike Gonek	Ive Secret	
"Heroine"	2023	An Yu-jin	Ryan S. Jhun; Hilda Stenmalm; Ramus Budny; Shy Martin	Ryan S. Jhun; Rasmus Budny	I've Ive	
"Heya" †	2024	Lee Seu-ran; Exy; Sohlhee	Ryan S. Jhun; Dwayne Abernathy Jr. Ido Nadjar; Kloe Latimer; Jack Brady; Jordan Roman	Ryan S. Jhun; Dem Jointz; Ido Nadjar; The Wavys	I've Switch	
"Holy Moly"	2023	Seo Ji-eum	Ryan S. Jhun; Peter Rycroft; Lauren Aquilina; Clarence Coffee Jr.	Ryan S. Jhun; Peter Rycroft	I've Mine	
"Hot Coffee"	2026	Jo Yoon-kyung	Gucci Caliente; Kristine Bogan; Young Chance; MLite	Gucci Caliente; Young Chance	Revive+	
"Hush"	2026	Seo Jeong-ah	Jack Brady; Jordan Roman; Emma Rosen; Mathilde Nyegaard; MLite	The Wavys	Revive+	
"Hypnosis"	2023	Seo Jeong-a; Gaeul; Rei	Lauren Aquilina; Sophia Brenan; Fin Dow Smith; Christopher Smith; Corey Sanders; Adriaan Caldas De Barros; Elof Loelv	Starsmith; Risc; Elof Loelv	I've Ive	
"I Am" (Note: "I Am" Japanese version was released in 2024.) †	2023	Kim Eana	Ryan S. Jhun; Kristin Marie; Audun Agnar Guldbrandsen; Eline Noelia Myreng	Ryan S. Jhun; Audun Agnar Guldbrandsen; Kristin Marie	I've Ive	
"I Want" (Note: "I Want" is a promotional single released in 2023.) †	2023	Jeong Minji; Myung Jieun; Oh Yoowon; Ryan S. Jhun; Tyler Spry; Alida Peck; Alma Goodman; Sweetner	Ryan S. Jhun; Tyler Spry; Alida Peck; Alma Goodman	Ryan S. Jhun; Tyler Spry	Non-album single	
"Ice Queen"	2024	Seo Ji-eum	Seo Ji-eum; Jack Brady; Jordan Roman; Lauren Aquilina; Roland Spreckley	Ryan S. Jhun; The Wavys	I've Switch	
"In Your Heart" (Note: "In Your Heart" is a solo song by Rei)	2026	Rei; Rick Bridges	Rick Bridges; Steven; Deevan; Rei	Steven; Deevan	Revive+	
"Kitsch" †	2023	Lee Seu-ran; Hwang Hyun; Gaeul; Rei	Ryan S. Jhun; Lise Reppe; Audun Agnar Guldbrandsen; Kyle Joseph Faulkner; Tea Carpeter; Emily Harbakk; Stally; Pateko	Ryan S. Jhun; Audun Agnar Guldbrandsen; Stally; Pateko	I've Ive	
"Lips"	2023	Exy; Sohlhee	Ryan S. Jhun; Alexander Pavelich; Lauren Keen; Sean Davidson; Andre Davidson; Lars Rosness; Benjamin Pinkus	Ryan S. Jhun; Lars Rosness; Benjamin Pinkus	I've Ive	
"Love Dive" (Note: "Love Dive" Japanese version was released in 2023.) †	2022	Seo Ji-eum	Sophia Brennan; Elle Campbell; Nick Hahn	Nick Hahn	Love Dive	
"Midnight Kiss"	2025	Jo Yoon-kyung; Liz	Askjell Solstrand; Marcus White; Kristin Carpenter; MLite	Askjell Solstrand	Ive Secret	
"Mine"	2023	Jang Won-young	Ryan S. Jhun; Lauritz Emil Christiansen; Jeppe London Bilsby; Celine Svanbäck	Ryan S. Jhun; Lauritz Emil Christiansen; Jeppe London Bilsby	I've Ive	
"My Satisfaction"	2022	Lee Seu-ran	Ryan S. Jhun; Josh Cumbee; Afshin Salmani; Nat Dunn; Ilan Kidron; Anna Timgren; Justin Reinstein	Ryan S. Jhun; Josh Cumbee; Afshin Salmani; Avin; Slay	After Like	
"Next Page"	2023	Hwang Hyun; Gaeul; Rei	Ryan S. Jhun; Polar; Megan Ashworth	Ryan S. Jhun; Polar	I've Ive	
"Not Your Girl"	2023	Hwang Hyun; Gaeul; Rei	Ryan S. Jhun; Scott Russell Stoddart; Torine Michelle Bjaland; Anna Anita Jaskiv	Ryan S. Jhun; Scott Russell Stoddart	I've Ive	
"Odd" (Note: "Odd" is a solo song by Gaeul)	2026	Gaeul; Ahn Young-ju	Peter Rycroft; Tom Mann; Sara Boe; Tove Burman; MLite	Lostboy	Revive+	
"Off the Record" (Note: "Off the Record" Japanese version was released in 2024.) †	2023	Seo Ji-eum	Ryan S. Jhun; Sivert Hagtvet Hjeltnes; Bård Bonsaken; Hilda Stenmalm	Ryan S. Jhun; Sivert Hagtvet Hjeltnes	I've Mine	
"OTT"	2023	Jang Won-young	Ryan S. Jhun; Gustav Nyström; Von Tiger; Canto	Ryan S. Jhun; Gustav Nyström	I've Mine	
"Payback"	2023	Big Naughty; Young (MUMW); Ryan S. Jhun	Ryan S. Jhun; Willie Weeks; Ryan Curtis; Maddie Duke	Ryan S. Jhun; Willie Weeks	I've Mine	
"Rebel Heart" †	2025	Nietzche	Emily Harbakk; Ryan S. Jhun; Thomas Gustafsson; Jimmy Jansson; Maia Wright; Jack Brady; Jordan Roman	Ryan S. Jhun; Gucci Caliente; The Wavys	Ive Empathy	
"Reset"	2024	Seo Jeong-ah	Ryan S. Jhun; Tre Jean-Marie; Fanny Hultman; Kloe Latimer	Ryan S. Jhun; Tre Jean-Marie	I've Switch	
"Royal"	2022	Lee Seu-ran; Rick Bridges; Rei; Gaeul	Jamie Parker; Willie Weeks; Paulina Cerrilla; Kyler Niko	Jamie Parker; Willie Weeks	Love Dive	
"Shine with Me"	2023	Jang Won-young	Ryan S. Jhun; Erike Gustaf Smaaland; Kristoffer Chaka Bwanasi-Tømmerbakke; Alida Garpestad Peck	Ryan S. Jhun; Erike Gustaf Smaaland; Kristoffer Chaka Bwanasi-Tømmerbakke	I've Ive	
"Stuck in Your Head"	2026	Hwang Yu-bin	Jack Brady; Jordan Roman; Emma Rosen; Mathilde Nyegaard; MLite	The Wavys	Revive+	
"Summer Festa" (Note: "Summer Festa" is a promotional single released in 2024.) †	2024	Ji-in; Ryan S. Jhun; Jorgen Odegard; Elie Jay Rizk; Patrick 'J. Que.' Smith; Alna Hofmeyr	Ryan S. Jhun; Jorgen Odegard; Elie Jay Rizk; Patrick 'J. Que.' Smith; Alna Hofmeyr	Ryan S. Jhun; Elie Jay Rizk; Jorgen Odegard	Non-album single	
"Super Icy" (Note: "Super Icy" is a solo song by Leeseo)	2026	Leeseo; Jo Yoon-kyung	Lews Jankel; Connor Blake; Jordan Shaw; Lauren Aquilina; MLite	Shift K3y	Revive+	
"Take It" (Note: "Take It" Japanese version was released in 2023.)	2021	Lee Seu-ran	Daniel Kim; Jeremy G Willie	Willie	Eleven	
"Thank U"	2025	Liz; Youra (Full8loom)	Thomas Baxter; Ryan S. Jhun; Cleo Tighe	Ryan S. Jhun; Thomas Baxter	Ive Empathy	
"TKO"	2025	Jo Yoon-kyung	Sean Fischer; Ryan S. Jhun; David Charles Fischer; Sofia Kay; John Mavrogiannis	Ryan S. Jhun; Sean Fischer	Ive Empathy	
"Unreal" (Note: "Unreal" is a solo song by Liz)	2026	Liz	Willie Weeks; Paulina "Pau" Cerrilla; Ryan Curtis; MLite	Willie Weeks	Revive+	
"Wild Bird"	2025	Seo Jeong-ah	Jeppe London Bilsby; Clara Hangman; Sam Merrifield; Musikality	Jeppe London Bilsby	Ive Secret	
"Wow" (Note: "Wow" Japanese version was released in 2025.)	2024	Lee Seu-ran	Ryan S. Jhun; Charlie McClean; Kristine Marie Skolem; Roland Spreckley	Ryan S. Jhun; Charlie McClean	I've Switch	
"XOXZ" †	2025	Seo Ji-eum; Hwang Yu-bin (XYXX); Jang Won-young	Diederik van Elsas; Parrish Warrington; Julie Frost; Emma Rosen; Kristin Carpenter	Trackside; MLite	Ive Secret	
"You Wanna Cry"	2025	Exy	Jason Hahs; Ryan S. Jhun; Lauren Isenberg; Shannon Rubicam	Ryan S. Jhun; Jason Hahs	Ive Empathy	

== Songs originally recorded in Japanese ==
List of songs, showing year released, lyricist, composer, arranger, and originating album
Song	Year	Lyricist(s)	Composer(s)	Arranger(s)	Album	Ref.
"Be Alright" †	2025	Canchild; Monjoe	Henrik Sæter; Ole Georg Pedersen; Siri Elton; Jazara Hutton; Musikality	Richello; Henrik Sæter; Ole Georg Pedersen	Be Alright	
"Classic"	2023	Kanata Okajima	Ryan S. Jhun; Chloe Anne Latimer; Nina Nesbitt; Celine Svanbäck; Jeppe London Bilsby	Ryan S. Jhun; Jeppe London Bilsby	Wave	
"Crush" †	2024	Eill; Sunny	Ryan S. Jhun; Scott Stoddart; Alexej Viktorovitch; Anna Timgren	Ryan S. Jhun; Scott Stoddart	Alive	
"Dare Me"	2025	Momonady; TokyOdds	TokyOdds	TokyOdds	Damemane! - We'll Manage a Useless Talent OST / Be Alright	
"Fashion" †	2026	Sunny	UTA	UTA	Lucid Dream	
"Lucid Dream" †	2026	Eill	Jonah Renna; Bava; Paris Alexa; Samuil; MLite	Jonah Renna	Lucid Dream	
"Queen of Hearts"	2022	Mayu Wakisaka	Lauren Aquilina; Isaac Sakima; Joe Kearns	N/A	Eleven -Japanese ver.- (single album)	
"Wave" †	2023	Hiromi	Ryan S. Jhun; Gustav Landell; Simon Jonasson; Kristin Carpenter; Pateko; Stally	Ryan S. Jhun; Gustav Landell; Simon Jonasson; Pateko; Stally	Wave	
"Will"	2024	YheL, Ryo Ito, Garasha, Sorato	YheL, Ryo Ito, Garasha, Sorato	Sorato	Pokémon: Terastal Debut OST / Alive	

== Songs originally recorded in English ==
List of songs, showing year released, lyricist, composer, arranger, and originating album
Song	Year	Lyricist(s)	Composer(s)	Arranger(s)	Album	Ref.
"All Night" (featuring Saweetie) †	2024	Brian Lee; Elof Loelv; Jonathan Sloan; Aino Jawo; Caroline Hjelt; Luke Steele; Nick Littlemore	Brian Lee; Elof Loelv; Jonathan Sloan; Aino Jawo; Caroline Hjelt; Luke Steele; Nick Littlemore	Brian Lee; Elof Loelv	Non-album single	
"Supernova Love" (featuring David Guetta) †	2024	David Guetta; Giacomo Uber; Tobias Frederiksen; Johannes Shore; Mikkel Cox; Britt Pols; Ryuichi Sakamoto; Cameron Warren; Daniel Kim	David Guetta; Giacomo Uber; Tobias Frederiksen; Johannes Shore; Mikkel Cox; Britt Pols; Ryuichi Sakamoto; Cameron Warren; Daniel Kim	David Guetta; Giacomo Uber; Tobias Frederiksen; Johannes Shore; Mikkel Cox; Britt Pols; Godboy	Non-album single	

== See also ==
- Ive discography
