= Ive discography =

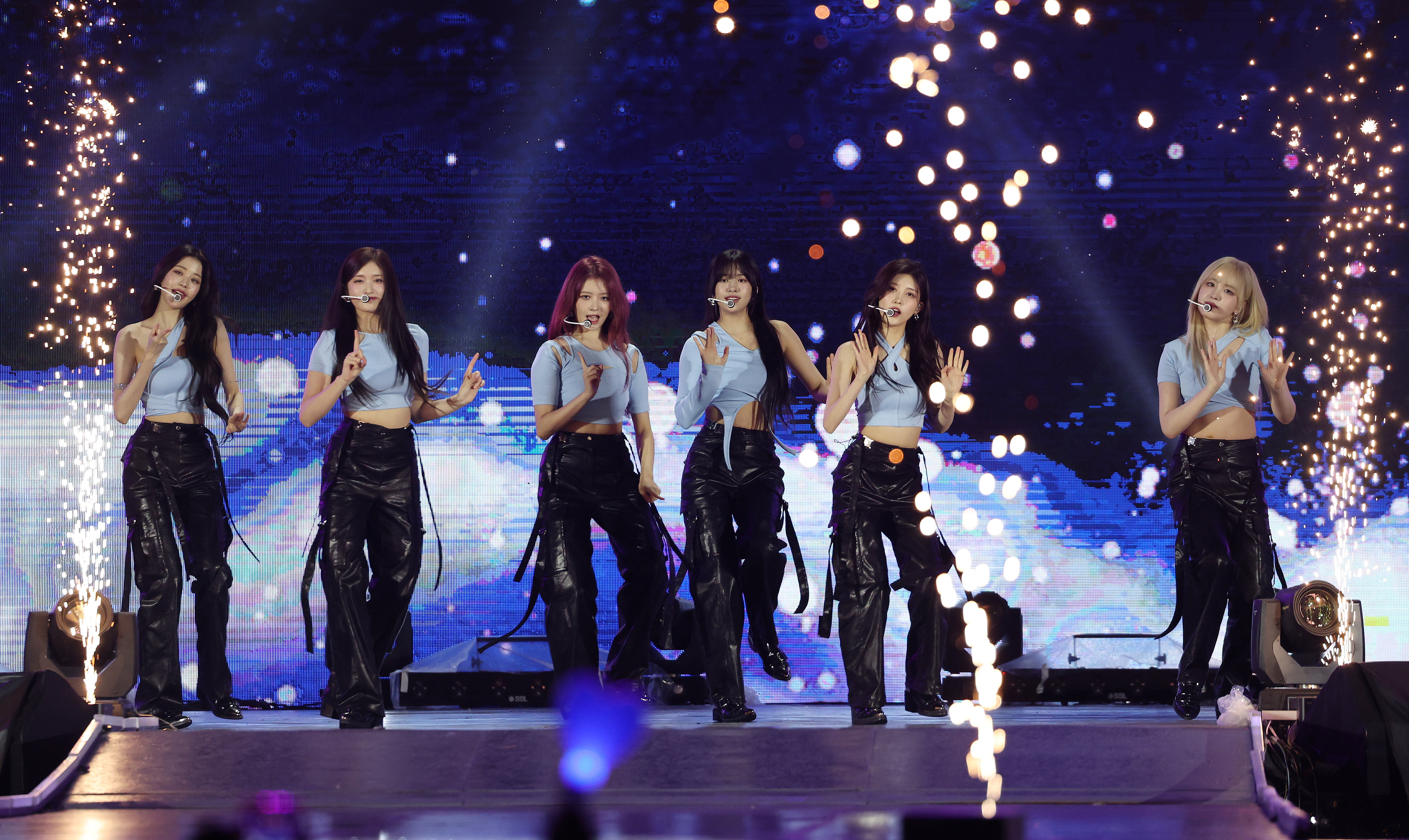
- Ive in 2023
- Studio albums: 2
- EPs: 9
- Singles: 26
- Single albums: 3
- Promotional singles: 2
- Soundtrack appearances: 2

South Korean girl group Ive has released two studio albums, nine extended plays, three single albums, twenty-six singles, and two promotional singles. As of November 2026, the group had sold over 14 million album copies worldwide.

The group debuted on December 1, 2021, with the single album, Eleven, which peaked at number one on the Circle Album Chart and was certified 2× platinum by the Korea Music Content Association (KMCA) for selling 500,000 copies. Its lead single of the same name peaked at number two on the Circle Digital Chart as well as on the Billboard K-pop Hot 100, and was certified platinum for reaching 100,000,000 streams in South Korea. The Japanese version of "Eleven" was released as a physical single in 2022, peaking in the top ten of the Oricon Singles Chart and the Billboard Japan Hot 100, and was certified gold by the Recording Industry Association of Japan (RIAJ) for surpassing 100,000 copies sold.

Ive released their second single album, Love Dive on April 5, 2022, which debuted at number one on the Circle Album Chart and was certified 3× Platinum for selling 750,000 copies. Its lead single of the same name topped the Circle Digital Chart for 4 weeks and ranked as the best-performing single of the year. The group's third single album, After Like, released on August 22, was their third number-one album on the Circle Album Chart and their first album to be certified million, surpassing over 1.7 million copies sold. Its lead single of the same name became their second number-one song on the Circle Digital Chart. Both "Love Dive" and "After Like" were certified platinum in South Korea and reached the top ten of the Billboard Global Excl. US.

On April 10, 2023, Ive's debut studio album, I've Ive was released, to commercial success, becoming their fourth number-one album on the Circle Album Chart. It was certified million by the Korea Music Content Association and sold over 1.6 million copies. It was supported by the singles "Kitsch" and "I Am", which became their third and fourth consecutive number-one songs on the Circle Digital Chart. On May 31, Ive released their first Japanese EP Wave, which debuted at number one on the Oricon Albums Chart and was certified gold in Japan for selling 100,000 copies. Ive's first Korean EP, I've Mine, was released on October 13, 2023, which reached number one on the Circle Album Chart and was their third album to sell over a million copies. It was accompanied by the top-five single "Either Way", "Off the Record", and their fifth number-one single "Baddie". On April 29, 2024, Ive released their second Korean EP, Ive Switch which reached the top five of the Circle Album Chart and became their fourth album to sell over a million copies with the top-five single "Heya", and "Accendio", the album would later end up becoming the best selling girl group album of 2024. On August 28, 2024, the group released their second Japanese EP, Alive which debuted and peaked at number-two on the Oricon Albums Chart and was later certified platinum in Japan for selling 250,000 copies.

On February 3, 2025, Ive released their third Korean EP, Ive Empathy which debuted and peaked at number one on the Circle Album Chart making it their sixth album to reach number one and their fifth album to reach a million copies, it was supported by the singles "Rebel Heart" and "Attitude". Both singles charted within the top 10 of Circle Digital chart, with "Rebel Heart" peaking at number 1 and becoming the group's fifth single to achieve a perfect all-kill (PAK) on Korean music charts. On August 25, Ive released their fourth extended play Ive Secret, with the lead single "XOXZ". Upon release, the album peaked at number 1 of Circle Album Chart, making it the group's seventh album to reach number one and their sixth million-seller.

On February 23, 2026, six months after their last release, Ive released their second studio album, Revive+, supported by the pre-release single "Bang Bang", and the lead single "Blackhole". On February 24, "Bang Bang" became the group's sixth single to achieve a perfect all-kill.

== Studio albums ==
List of studio albums, showing selected details, selected chart positions, sales figures, and certifications
Title	Details	Peak chart positions							Sales	Certifications (Note: For physical units sold, unless stated otherwise.)
Title	Details	KOR	CRO Sales	JPN	JPN Cmb.	JPN Hot	UK DL	US World	Sales	Certifications
I've Ive	Released: April 10, 2023; Label: Starship, Columbia; Formats: CD, digital download, streaming	1	39	5	2	10	97	7	WW: 1,700,000; KOR: 1,694,574; JPN: 33,086	KMCA: Million
Revive+	Released: February 23, 2026; Label: Starship, Columbia; Formats: CD, LP, digital download, streaming	2	—	7	8	7	—	3	KOR: 1,066,730; JPN: 32,292	KMCA: 3× Platinum

== Extended plays ==
=== Korean extended plays ===
List of Korean extended plays, showing selected details, selected chart positions, sales figures, and certifications
Title	Details	Peak chart positions										Sales	Certifications
Title	Details	KOR	AUS Dig.	HUN Phy.	JPN	JPN Cmb.	JPN Hot	NGR	UK DL	US	US World	Sales	Certifications
I've Mine	Released: October 13, 2023; Label: Starship, Columbia; Formats: CD, digital download, streaming	1	45	—	3	3	20	—	97	—	12	WW: 2,200,000; KOR: 2,107,847; JPN: 142,825	KMCA: 2× Million
Ive Switch	Released: April 29, 2024; Label: Starship, Columbia; Formats: CD, digital download, streaming	2	—	29	3	3	12	76	—	—	—	WW: 1,700,000; KOR: 1,750,416; JPN: 71,748	KMCA: Million
Ive Empathy	Released: February 3, 2025; Label: Starship, Columbia; Formats: CD, digital download, streaming	1	—	—	3	2	21	—	—	—	22	WW: 1,490,000; KOR: 1,483,824; JPN: 60,888	KMCA: Million
Ive Secret	Released: August 25, 2025; Label: Starship, Columbia; Formats: CD, digital download, streaming	1	—	—	4	4	10	—	—	—	4	WW: 1,070,000; KOR: 1,213,603; JPN: 59,633	KMCA: Million
Looks Can Kill	Released: October 26, 2026; Label: Starship, Columbia; Formats: CD, digital download, streaming	1	—	—	6	7	—	—	—	126	2	KOR: 788,958; JPN: 14,133	
"—" denotes a recording that did not chart or was not released in that territory.

=== Japanese extended plays ===
List of Japanese extended plays, showing selected details, selected chart positions, sales figures, and certifications
Title	Details	Peak chart positions			Sales	Certifications
Title	Details	JPN	JPN Cmb.	JPN Hot	Sales	Certifications
Wave	Released: May 31, 2023; Label: Starship, Ariola Japan; Formats: CD, digital download, streaming	1	1	1	JPN: 132,286	RIAJ: Gold
Alive	Released: August 28, 2024; Label: Starship, Ariola Japan; Formats: CD, digital download, streaming	2	2	2	JPN: 216,410	RIAJ: Platinum
Be Alright	Released: July 30, 2025; Label: Starship, Ariola Japan; Formats: CD, digital download, streaming; Track listing: 1. "Be Alright"; 2. "Dare Me"; 3. "Accendio" (Japanese version); 4. "Blue Heart" (Japanese version); 5. "Wow" (Japanese version)	1	1	2	JPN: 226,295	RIAJ: Gold
Lucid Dream	Released: May 27, 2026; Label: Starship, Ariola Japan; Formats: CD, digital download, streaming; Track listing: 1. "Lucid Dream"; 2. "Fashion"; 3. "Jigsaw"; 4. "Rebel Heart" (Japanese version); 5. "Attitude" (Japanese version); 6. "Thank U" (Japanese version)	1	1	2	JPN: 163,893	RIAJ: Platinum

== Single albums ==
List of single albums, showing selected details, selected chart positions, sales figures, and certifications
Title	Details	Peak chart positions		Sales	Certifications
Title	Details	KOR	CRO Sales	Sales	Certifications
Eleven	Released: December 1, 2021; Label: Starship; Formats: CD, digital download, streaming	1	—	KOR: 565,456	KMCA: 2× Platinum
Love Dive	Released: April 5, 2022; Label: Starship; Formats: CD, digital download, streaming	1	—	KOR: 1,046,467	KMCA: Million
After Like	Released: August 22, 2022; Label: Starship; Formats: CD, digital download, streaming	1	20	KOR: 1,760,706	KMCA: Million
"—" denotes a recording that did not chart or was not released in that territory.

== Singles ==
=== As lead artist ===
==== Korean singles ====
List of Korean singles, showing year released, selected chart positions, sales figures, certifications, and album name
Title	Year	Peak chart positions										Sales	Certifications	Album
Title	Year	KOR	CAN	HK	JPN Cmb.	JPN Hot	NZ Hot	SGP	TWN	US World	WW	Sales	Certifications	Album
"Eleven"	2021	2	—	9	14	16	20	7	—	9	68		KMCA: Platinum	Eleven
"Love Dive"	2022	1	92	14	6	8	11	2	7	8	15	WW: 2,800; JPN: 2,959	KMCA: 2× Platinum; RMNZ: Gold	Love Dive
"After Like"	2022	1	96	14	11	13	4	2	5	3	20	WW: 3,000; JPN: 6,219	KMCA: Platinum; RMNZ: Gold	After Like
"Kitsch"	2023	1	—	17	26	37	23	7	7	11	59	JPN: 1,861	KMCA: Platinum	I've Ive
"I Am"	2023	1	93	3	10	10	11	3	3	6	21	JPN: 3,888	KMCA: 2× Platinum	I've Ive
"Either Way"	2023	3	—	21	—	80	38	27	24	8	160			I've Mine
"Off the Record"	2023	14	—	11	—	—	19	17	13	10	181			I've Mine
"Baddie"	2023	1	—	9	22	21	16	10	5	—	66		RIAJ: Gold	I've Mine
"Heya" (해야)	2024	2	—	13	33	32	30	22	4	—	56			Ive Switch
"Accendio"	2024	32	—	—	—	85	—	—	23	—	— (Note: "Accendio" did not enter the Billboard Global 200, but peaked at number 129 on the Global Excl. US.)			Ive Switch
"Rebel Heart"	2025	1	—	12	44	44	—	22	7	6	97	JPN: 1,375		Ive Empathy
"Attitude"	2025	7	—	15	46	48	—	— (Note: "Attitude" did not enter the Official Singapore Chart, but peaked at number 14 on the Regional Chart.)	13	—	143			Ive Empathy
"XOXZ"	2025	6	—	10	31	31	32	25	4	—	89	JPN: 812		Ive Secret
"Bang Bang"	2026	2	—	8	23	21	25	16	2	6	61	JPN: 2,924		Revive+
"Blackhole"	2026	9	—	—	—	50	—	— (Note: "Blackhole" did not enter the Official Singapore Chart, but peaked at number 21 on the Regional Chart.)	14	—	— (Note: "Blackhole" did not enter the Billboard Global 200, but peaked at number 130 on the Global Excl. US.)			Revive+
"Looks Can Kill"	2026	4	—	19	42	28	—	— (Note: "Looks Can Kill" did not enter the Official Singapore Chart, but peaked at number 14 on the Regional Chart.)	6	—	194			Looks Can Kill
"—" denotes a recording that did not chart or was not released in that territory.

==== Japanese singles ====
List of Japanese singles, showing year released, selected chart positions, sales figures, certifications, and album name
Title	Year	Peak chart positions			Sales	Certifications	Album
Title	Year	JPN	JPN Cmb.	JPN Hot	Sales	Certifications	Album
"Eleven"	2022	4	4	9	JPN: 108,787	RIAJ: Gold	Non-album single
"Love Dive"	2023	—	— (Note: "Love Dive (Japanese Version)" did not enter the Oricon Combined Singles Chart, but peaked at number 44 on the Oricon Streaming Chart.)	—			Wave
"Wave"	2023	—	— (Note: "Wave" did not enter the Oricon Combined Singles Chart, but peaked at number 37 on the Oricon Streaming Chart.)	62			Wave
"Crush"	2024	—	—	—			Alive
"Dare Me" (Note: "Dare Me" was also released as a soundtrack for Damemane! - We'll Manage a Useless Talent.)	2025	—	—	—			Be Alright
"Be Alright"	2025	—	—	80			Be Alright
"Fashion" (Note: "Fashion" was also released as part of Apple Japan's "Every Step, with the App Store" campaign.)	2026	—	—	—			Lucid Dream
"Lucid Dream"	2026	—	—	—			Lucid Dream
"—" denotes a recording that did not chart.

==== English singles ====
List of English singles, showing year released, selected chart positions, and album name
Title	Year	Peak chart positions							Album
Title	Year	KOR	JPN Hot	NZ Hot	SGP	US D/E	US World	WW Excl. US	Album
"All Night" (featuring Saweetie)	2024	104	—	32	—	—	10	—	Non-album singles
"Supernova Love" (with David Guetta)	2024	142	72	10	21	14	—	160	Non-album singles
"—" denotes a recording that did not chart in that territory.

=== Promotional singles ===
List of promotional singles, showing year released, selected chart positions, and album name
Title	Year	Peak chart positions	Album
Title	Year	KOR	Album
"I Want"	2023	35	Non-album singles
"Summer Festa"	2024	— (Note: "Summer Festa" did not enter the Circle Digital Chart, but peaked at number 20 on the component Download Chart.)	Non-album singles
"—" denotes a recording that did not chart in that territory.

== Soundtrack appearances ==
List of soundtrack appearances, showing year released, selected chart positions, and album name
Title	Year	Peak chart positions	Album
Title	Year	JPN Dig.	Album
"Will" (Note: "Will" was released as a soundtrack for Pokémon: Terastal Debut.)	2024	46	Alive
"Will" (Korean version)	2024	—	Pokémon: Terastal Debut OST
"—" denotes a recording that did not chart in that territory.

== Other charted songs ==
List of other charted songs, showing year released, selected chart positions, sales figures, and album name
Title	Year	Peak chart positions			Sales	Album
Title	Year	KOR	JPN Dig.	US World	Sales	Album
"Take It"	2021	— (Note: "Take It" did not enter the Circle Digital Chart, but peaked at number 98 on the component Download Chart.)	—	—		Eleven
"Royal"	2022	171	46	—		Love Dive
"My Satisfaction"	2022	104	39	8	JPN: 1,671	After Like
"Blue Blood"	2023	61	—	—		I've Ive
"Lips"	2023	93	—	—		I've Ive
"Heroine"	2023	125	—	—		I've Ive
"Mine"	2023	122	—	—		I've Ive
"Hypnosis" (섬찢)	2023	127	—	—		I've Ive
"Not Your Girl"	2023	110	—	—		I've Ive
"Next Page" (궁금해)	2023	152	—	—		I've Ive
"Cherish"	2023	154	—	—		I've Ive
"Shine with Me"	2023	153	—	—		I've Ive
"Holy Moly"	2023	— (Note: "Holy Moly" did not enter the Circle Digital Chart, but peaked at number 24 on the component Download Chart.)	—	—		I've Mine
"OTT"	2023	— (Note: "OTT" did not enter the Circle Digital Chart, but peaked at number 23 on the component Download Chart.)	—	—		I've Mine
"Payback"	2023	— (Note: "Payback" did not enter the Circle Digital Chart, but peaked at number 25 on the component Download Chart.)	—	—		I've Mine
"Blue Heart"	2024	128	—	—		Ive Switch
"Ice Queen"	2024	145	—	—		Ive Switch
"Wow"	2024	160	—	—		Ive Switch
"Reset"	2024	183	—	—		Ive Switch
"Flu"	2025	145	—	—		Ive Empathy
"You Wanna Cry"	2025	191	—	—		Ive Empathy
"Thank U"	2025	— (Note: "Thank U" did not enter the Circle Digital Chart, but peaked at number 13 on the component Download Chart.)	—	—		Ive Empathy
"TKO"	2025	— (Note: "TKO" did not enter the Circle Digital Chart, but peaked at number 12 on the component Download Chart.)	—	—		Ive Empathy
"Wild Bird"	2025	165	—	—		Ive Secret
"Dear, My Feelings"	2025	198	—	—		Ive Secret
"Gotcha (Baddest Eros)"	2025	— (Note: "Gotcha (Baddest Eros)" did not enter the Circle Digital Chart, but peaked at number 21 on the component Download Chart.)	—	—		Ive Secret
"♥ Beats" (삐빅)	2025	— (Note: "♥ Beats" did not enter the Circle Digital Chart, but peaked at number 20 on the component Download Chart.)	—	—		Ive Secret
"Midnight Kiss"	2025	— (Note: "Midnight Kiss" did not enter the Circle Digital Chart, but peaked at number 22 on the component Download Chart.)	—	—		Ive Secret
"Hush" (숨바꼭질)	2026	200	—	—		Revive+
"Fireworks"	2026	177	—	—		Revive+
"8" (Jang Won-young solo)	2026	17	—	—		Revive+
"Odd" (Gaeul solo)	2026	109	—	—		Revive+
"Force" (An Yu-jin solo)	2026	61	—	—		Revive+
"In Your Heart" (Rei solo)	2026	— (Note: "In Your Heart" did not enter the Circle Digital Chart, but peaked at number 18 on the component Download Chart.)	—	—		Revive+
"Unreal" (Liz solo)	2026	— (Note: "Unreal" did not enter the Circle Digital Chart, but peaked at number 22 on the component Download Chart.)	—	—		Revive+
"Super Icy" (Leeseo solo)	2026	— (Note: "Super Icy" did not enter the Circle Digital Chart, but peaked at number 26 on the component Download Chart.)	—	—		Revive+
"—" denotes a recording that did not chart or was not released in that territory.

== See also ==
- List of songs recorded by Ive
