= I Want =

I Want may refer to:

- "I Want" (song), a 2023 song by South Korean girl group Ive
- "I Want" song, a type of song popular in musical theatre
- "I Want", a song by One Direction from their debut album Up All Night
- "I Want", the third single by Department S
- "I Want", a 2016 song by MadeinTYO from the mixtape You Are Forgiven
- "I Want", a 2017 song by Ruby Fields from Fields' EP Your Dad's Opinion for Dinner
- I Want, a 2014 album by the Kolors
- "Gimme What I Don't Know (I Want)", a 2013 song by Justin Timberlake
- Je veux, literally "I want", a 2010 single by Zaz
