= Alive (Ive EP) =

- Digital cover

EP by Ive
- Released: August 28, 2024
- Genre: J-pop
- Length: 15:27
- Languages: Japanese; English
- Labels: Starship; Ariola Japan

Ive chronology
Ive Switch (2024)	Alive (2024)	Ive Empathy (2025)

Singles from Alive
- 1. "Crush" Released: August 7, 2024

Alive is the second Japanese extended play (EP) and fourth overall by South Korean girl group Ive. It was released on August 28, 2024, by Starship Entertainment and Ariola Japan. The EP contains 5 tracks, including the lead single "Crush", "Will" which was previously released as a soundtrack for Pokémon: Terastal Debut, and the Japanese version of "I Am", "Off the Record", and "Baddie".

== Background and composition ==
On April 12, 2024, Ive released the Japanese single "Will" as a soundtrack for Pokémon: Terastal Debut. On July 15, Starship announced Ive's second Japanese EP Alive, along with its track listing, which includes "Will". The lead single, "Crush", was released on August 7, ahead of the EP's release. "Crush" was described as a soft pop song, which is unlike what Ive's music is mostly known for.

== Promotion ==
Ive performed "Crush" on the September 2 episode of TBS' Count Down TV in Japan. Advertisements to promote the EP were also placed around Shibuya, including one at an exit of Shibuya Station.

== Commercial performance ==
Alive debuted at number 2 on the Oricon Albums Chart and the Billboard Japan Hot Albums chart, and topped the Billboard Japan Top Albums Sales chart. Additionally, the EP was certified platinum by the Recording Industry Association of Japan, with at least 250,000 copies sold.

== Track listing ==
Alive track listing
No.	Title	Lyrics	Music	Arrangement	Length
1.	"Crush"	Eill; Sunny	Ryan S. Jhun; Scott Stoddart; Alexej Viktorovitch; Anna Timgren	Jhun; Stoddart	3:29
2.	"Will"	Yhel; Gratia; Sorato; Ryo Ito	Yhel; Gratia; Sorato; Ito	Sorato	3:11
3.	"I Am" (Japanese version)	Momonady; Riho Okano; Mayumi Kaneko; Hiyori Nara	Jhun; Kristin Marie Skolem; Audun Agnar Guldbrandsen; Eline Noelia Myreng	Jhun; Skolem; Guldbrandsen	3:03
4.	"Off the Record" (Japanese version)	Rose Blueming; Momonady; Yuko Konishi	Jhun; Sivert Hagtvet Hjeltnes; Bård Bonsaken; Hilda Stenmalm	Jhun; Hjeltne	3:08
5.	"Baddie" (Japanese version)	Show; Momonady; Rose Blueming; Haruka Mizuguchi; Mizui Toutosa	Jhun; Christopher Smith; Fin Dow-Smith; Lauren Aquilina	Jhun; Dow-Smith; RISC	2:34
Total length:					15:27

== Charts ==
=== Weekly charts ===
Weekly chart performance for Alive
Chart (2024)	Peak position
Japanese Albums (Oricon)	2
Japanese Combined Albums (Oricon)	2
Japanese Hot Albums (Billboard Japan)	2

=== Monthly charts ===
Monthly chart performance for Alive
Chart (2024)	Position
Japanese Albums (Oricon)	4

=== Year-end charts ===
Year-end chart performance for Alive
Chart (2024)	Position
Japanese Hot Albums (Billboard Japan)	39

== Certifications ==
Certifications for Alive
Region	Certification	Certified units/sales
Japan (RIAJ)	Platinum	250,000^{^}
^{^} Shipments figures based on certification alone.

== Release history ==
Release history for Alive
Region	Date	Format	Label
Japan	August 28, 2024	CD	Ariola Japan
Various	August 28, 2024	Digital download; streaming	Starship
