= I've Mine =

- Digital cover

EP by Ive
- Released: October 13, 2023
- Genre: K-pop
- Length: 17:12
- Languages: Korean; English
- Labels: Starship; Kakao; Columbia

Ive chronology
Wave (2023)	I've Mine (2023)	Ive Switch (2024)

Singles from I've Mine
- 1. "Either Way" Released: September 25, 2023; 2. "Off the Record" Released: October 6, 2023; 3. "Baddie" Released: October 13, 2023

I've Mine is the first Korean-language extended play music album and second overall by South Korean girl group Ive. It was released by Starship Entertainment on October 13, 2023, and contains six tracks, including three singles: "Either Way", "Off the Record", and "Baddie".

The album debuted with over 1.7 million copies sold in its first week of release and peaked at number one on the Circle Album Chart the following week, becoming Ive's fifth number-one album on the chart. It has since been certified double million by the Korea Music Content Association (KMCA) for selling 2,000,000 units. For the album, Ive was awarded the Best Album Bonsang at the 38th Golden Disc Awards.

== Background and release ==
On September 3, 2023, Starship Entertainment announced Ive would be releasing their first Korean extended play I've Mine on October 13. It was also announced that I've Mine would have three singles with "Either Way" pre-released on September 25, "Off the Record" pre-released on October 6, and "Baddie" scheduled to be released together with the extended play on October 13. On September 11, the track listing was released. On September 25, "Either Way" was released alongside its music video. On October 1, a teaser video for "Off the Record" was released. Five days later, "Off the Record" was released alongside its music video. On October 8, a teaser video for "Baddie" was released. Three days later, the highlight medley teaser video was released. The extended play was released alongside the music video for "Baddie" on October 13.

== Composition ==
I've Mine consists of six tracks. The first track "Off the Record" was described a song with "rhythmic beat" characterized by "groovy and heavy bass guitar" with lyrics that "tells the story of girls who are curious about love in the middle of the night when no one is sleeping". The second track "Baddie" was described a "dark charm" song characterized by "strong trap beat" and "electric bass rhythm" with lyrics "conveying the message of self-confidence". The third track "Either Way" was described a song with "a dreamy synth and lyrical atmosphere" with lyrics about "being free from other people's gaze".

== Critical reception ==
Professional ratings
Review scores
Source	Rating
IZM	2.5/5 stars
NME	4/5 stars

The album received generally positive reviews from critics. India Roby of Nylon described the album as "explosive tracks seamlessly intertwining their signature sound, punchy rhythms with flowery hints, with experimental twists". NME's Crystal Bell gave the album 4 stars out of 5, writing that it was a "versatile showcase of Ive's many facets".

=== Accolades ===
Awards and nominations for I've Mine
Award ceremony	Year	Category	Result	Ref.
Circle Chart Music Awards	2024	Artist of the Year – Album	Nominated	
Golden Disc Awards	2024	Best Album (Bonsang)	Won	
Golden Disc Awards	2024	Album of the Year (Daesang)	Nominated	

== Commercial performance ==
Commercially, the album sold 1.6 million copies, marking Ive's highest first week sales and their third album to surpass one million sales.

== Track listing ==
I've Mine track listing
No.	Title	Lyrics	Music	Arrangement	Length
1.	"Off the Record"	Seo Ji-eum	Ryan S. Jhun; Sivert Hagtvet Hjeltnes; Bård Bonsaken; Hilda Stenmalm	Ryan S. Jhun; Sivert Hagtvet Hjeltnes	3:09
2.	"Baddie"	Big Naughty; Perrie; Ryan S. Jhun	Ryan S. Jhun; Christopher Smith; Fin Dow-Smith; Lauren Aquilina	Ryan S. Jhun; Starsmith; Risc; Alawn	2:34
3.	"Either Way"	Sunwoo Jung-a	Ryan S. Jhun; Luke Fitton; Lauren Aquilina; Liam O'Donnell	Ryan S. Jhun; Luke Fitton	2:47
4.	"Holy Moly"	Seo Ji-eum	Ryan S. Jhun; Peter Rycroft; Lauren Aquilina; Clarence Coffee Jr.	Ryan S. Jhun; Lostboy	2:57
5.	"OTT"	Jang Won-young	Ryan S. Jhun; Gustav Nyström; Von Tiger; Canto	Ryan S. Jhun; Gustav Nyström	2:37
6.	"Payback"	Big Naughty; Young (MUMW); Ryan S. Jhun	Ryan S. Jhun; Willie Weeks; Ryan Curtis; Maddie Duke	Ryan S. Jhun; Willie Weeks	3:08
Total length:					17:12

== Charts ==
=== Weekly charts ===
Weekly chart performance for I've Mine
Chart (2023–2024)	Peak position
Australian Digital Albums (ARIA)	45
Australian Hitseekers Albums (ARIA)	11
Japanese Albums (Oricon)	3
Japanese Combined Albums (Oricon)	3
Japanese Hot Albums (Billboard Japan)	20
South Korean Albums (Circle)	1
UK Album Downloads (Official Charts)	97
US Heatseekers Albums (Billboard)	16
US World Albums (Billboard)	12

=== Monthly charts ===
Monthly chart performance for I've Mine
Chart (2023–2024)	Position
Japanese Albums (Oricon)	9
South Korean Albums (Circle)	3

=== Year-end charts ===
2023 year-end chart performance for I've Mine
Chart (2023)	Position
Japanese Albums (Oricon)	65
South Korean Albums (Circle)	11

2024 year-end chart performance for I've Mine
Chart (2024)	Position
Japanese Albums (Oricon)	57

== Certifications and sales ==
Certifications and sales for I've Mine
Region	Certification	Certified units/sales
Japan	—	141,848
South Korea (KMCA)	2× Million	1,941,754
Summaries
Worldwide (IFPI)	—	2,200,000

== Release history ==
Release history for I've Mine
Region	Date	Format	Label
Various	October 13, 2023	Digital download; streaming	Starship; Kakao; Columbia
South Korea	October 13, 2023	CD	Starship; Kakao; Columbia
United States	November 17, 2023	CD	Starship; Kakao; Columbia
