= Lauren Aquilina =

English singer and songwriter (born 1995)

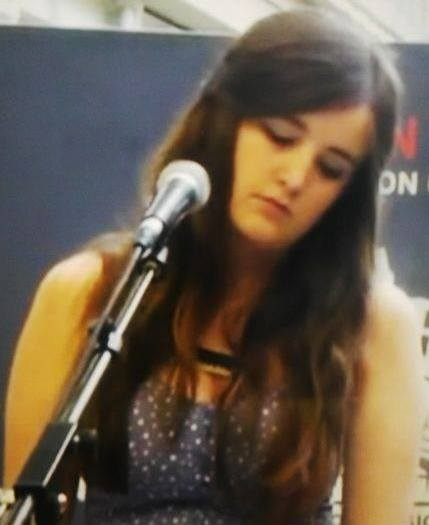
- Aquilina performing in Kings Cross, London in May 2013

Background information
- Born: Lauren Amber Aquilina; 23 June 1995 (age 31); Bristol, England
- Genres: Indie pop; soul; indie folk
- Occupations: Singer; songwriter
- Instruments: Vocals; piano
- Years active: 2011–2016, 2018–present
- Labels: Island Records; Universal Music Group; Interlude Artists

Lauren Amber Aquilina (born 23 June 1995) is an English singer-songwriter, and musician. Born in Bristol, she gained popularity by independently releasing a trilogy of EPs (Fools, Sinners, and Liars) whilst studying at school. Her debut album Isn't It Strange? was released on 26 August 2016, after being signed with Island Records and Universal Music Group. Aquilina took a musical hiatus in October 2016, but resumed in August 2018.

As a songwriter, Aquilina is known for writing for many K-pop and western artists, like Illit, Ive, Babymonster, Nmixx, Rebecca Black, Rina Sawayama, Demi Lovato, and Little Mix.

== Life and career ==
Aquilina was born on 23 June 1995 in Bristol to parents from Malta. Her musical origins began with her playing piano in school. She has been singing since she was eight years old and has been playing piano since she was nine. When she was thirteen years old she attended her first open mic event and sang "Poker Face" by Lady Gaga while her mother filmed her. Aquilina's manager (at the time), Ryan Walter, came across one of the videos and the two began working with one another putting together Aquilina's initial EP Fools.

In December 2011, Aquilina uploaded a cover of Brenda Russell's song "Get Here", which she recorded at home to raise money for the Meningitis Trust. She said that she was "trying to raise as much money as I can for a good cause, especially at Christmas time." In August 2012, Aquilina announced her independently released debut EP Fools through her management label Interlude Artists which was released on iTunes on 22 October 2012. To promote her EP, Aquilina performed an eight-song set in Tromsø, Norway, and was noticed by a Norwegian newspaper who called Aquilina "a great, talented songwriter who plays piano to accompany her beautiful voice." In September 2012, Aquilina announced through social media that she would be headlining her very first UK tour in early 2013. The title track from Fools received its first UK national radio play on BBC Radio 1 on 15 October 2012 on the BBC Introducing show.

It was announced on 15 August 2013 that Aquilina would headline the BBC Introducing stage at Reading & Leeds Festival 2013. She also played her first ever show in the United States on 21 August 2013, when she played a sold-out headline show at Manhattan's Rockwood Hall. Aquilina released her final EP Liars in the Fools, Sinners, Liars EP trilogy on 10 March 2014. Having asked to hear Lauren's third EP Liars, which she recorded and marketed with her manager, Island Records and Universal Music Group signed Aquilina as a new artist. In June 2014, Aquilina collaborated with Scottish band Prides on one of their tracks, "Strong Enough". Aquilina released her debut album Isn't It Strange? under Island Records and Universal Music Group on 26 August 2016 (Enn Kosova-Maudling). On 10 October 2016, Aquilina announced on her Twitter and Facebook accounts that she was no longer going to be writing music or performing for herself and that Isn't It Strange? would be her final album. In November 2020, she admitted that her break from the music industry had to do with mental health issues and credits working with Kylie Minogue as the catalyst for getting her excited about it once again.

Aquilina returned to music in 2018 with "Psycho", from an EP set for a 2020 release. This was followed by numerous singles, including "Tobacco In My Sheets" in March 2019, "Swap Places" in October 2020, and "Best Friend" in November 2020. Following the release of "Best Friend", Aquilina announced the release of her EP Ghost World, which was released on 13 November 2020. On 23 April 2021, she released the single "The Knife".

== Reception ==
Music reviewing website "Sound Of The Day" praised Aquilina's vocals in her cover of Lana Del Rey's "Born To Die":

"[She] took this cover and exploded it, and took [Del Rey's] vocals to another level. She has convinced me that with her very touching and emotional feel to her voice, she can change the course of many up and coming musicians. She is just in her room with a mic and keyboard, and has something to say, imagine her in an actual studio with better equipment. This girl could be a force on whatever label she signs with. The song and Lauren remind me of the beautiful Adele. Adele has a very powerful voice and people know when she is in the room. Lauren has that presence with her beautiful voice and amazing talent."

Fortitude Magazine writer Maxie Molotov-Smith complimented Aquilina's musical approach and rated her third EP, Liars, a five out of five star rating. Praising,

"Lauren’s sound is beautifully crafted soul-inflected Piano Pop (a sound that Sara Bareilles, Chantal Kreviazuk and Regina Spektor have been known to dabble in) that conjures lifting atmospheres, honey-sweet vocals and some of the wisest lyrics that any teenage songwriter has ever written".

== Influences ==
Aquilina credits Stereophonics, Coldplay, Red Hot Chili Peppers and Annie Lennox as influences.

== Personal life ==
Aquilina identifies as bisexual. As of 2021, she shared a flat with fellow musician Orla Gartland.

== Discography ==
=== Studio albums ===
Title	Details	Peak Chart Positions	
Title	Details	UK	SCO
Isn't It Strange?	Released: 26 August 2016; Label: Island Records; Format: Digital download, CD, streaming	64 (Note: Isn't It Strange? also charted at 44 on the Album Sales Chart, 32 on the Album Downloads Chart and 66 on the Physical Albums Chart.)	46

=== Extended plays ===
Title	Details
Fools	Released: 22 October 2012; Label: Independent; Format: Digital download, streaming
Sinners	Released: 22 July 2013; Label: Independent; Format: Digital download, streaming
Liars	Released: 10 March 2014; Label: UIR; Format: Digital download, streaming
Ocean	Released: 9 October 2015; Label: Island Records; Format: Digital download, streaming
Ghost World	Released: 13 November 2020; Label: Independent; Format: Digital download, streaming

=== Singles ===
Title	Year	Peak Chart Positions	Album
Title	Year	UK	Album
"Fools"	2012	72	Fools
"King"	2012	—	Fools
"Sinners"	2013	66	Sinners
"Lovers or Liars"	2014	58	Liars
"Time To Say Goodbye"	2015	197	Non-album single
"Ocean"	2015	—	Ocean
"Low"	2015	—	Ocean
"Echoes"	2015	—	Non-album single
"Kicks"	2016	—	Isn't It Strange?
"How Would You Like It?"	2016	—	Isn't It Strange?
"Midnight Mouths"	2016	—	Isn't It Strange?
"Psycho"	2018	—	Ghost World
"If Looks Could Kill"	2019	—	Non-album single
"Tobacco In My Sheets"	2019	—	Ghost World
"Bad People"	2020	—	Non-album single
"Swap Places"	2020	—	Ghost World
"Best Friend"	2020	—	Ghost World
"The Knife"	2021	—	Non-album singles
"Empathy"	2021	—	Non-album singles
"Hanging By Your Halo"	2022	—	Non-album singles
"—" denotes releases that did not chart.

=== Featured tracks ===
- "Flaws & Ceilings" with Frank Hamilton (2012)
- "Strong Enough" with Prides (2014)
- "FU4E" with Lost Kings (2019)
- "Crazy Human Psycho Crush – Mashup" (Human, I Go Crazy, Crush, Psycho) (with Orla Gartland, Tessa Violet, & Dodie) (2018)
- "Insecurity Mashup 2" (Cool Girl, Swap Places, Pretending, Games) (with Orla Gartland, Dodie, & Tessa Violet) (2021)

=== Songwriting credits ===
Song	Year	Artist	Album
"Lost"	2015	Emji	Folies douces
"3AM" (featuring Katie Herzig)	2015	RAC	Non-album single
"Worthy of You"	2018	Plested	First & Foremost
"Shoot Down the Sun"	2018	Hook n Sling	Non-album singles
"Anyway"	2018	Jack Vallier	Non-album singles
"I Believe You"	2018	Fletcher	Non-album singles
"Maybe It Was Me"	2018	Sody	Non-album singles
"Groove Nocy Letniej"	2019	4Dreamers	nb.
"Cruel to Be Kind"	2019	Ea Kaya	Non-album singles
"Devil"	2019	CLC	Non-album singles
"Poppin' Star"	2019	TXT	The Dream Chapter: Magic
"Crazy Enough"	2019	Julie Bergan	Hard Feelings
"Hard Feelings"	2019	Julie Bergan	Hard Feelings
"Like You Say You Do"	2019	Gabrielle Aplin	Dear Happy
"Wrong"	2020	Louise Redknapp	Heavy Love
"Tokyo Love Hotel"	2020	Rina Sawayama	Sawayama
"Bedroom Ceiling"	2020	Sody	Non-album single
"Invisible"	2020	Grace Davies	Friends with Tragic
"Addicted to Blue"	2020	Grace Davies	Friends with Tragic
"Josslyn"	2020	Olivia O'Brien	The Results Of My Poor Judgement
"Criminal"	2020	Taemin	Never Gonna Dance Again
"Lucid"	2020	Rina Sawayama	Sawayama (Deluxe)
"Carefully"	2021	Demi Lovato	Dancing with the Devil... the Art of Starting Over
"California Sober"	2021	Demi Lovato	Dancing with the Devil... the Art of Starting Over
"Butterfly"	2021	Demi Lovato	Dancing with the Devil... the Art of Starting Over
"EveryTime I Cry"	2021	Ava Max	Non-album single
"Can't Say No"	2021	Carol Ades	Through
"Through"	2021	Carol Ades	Through
"Brunette Caroline"	2021	Carol Ades	Through
"Sims"	2021	Corook	Achoo!
"Love (Sweet Love)"	2021	Little Mix	Between Us
"Cut You Off"	2021	Little Mix	Between Us
"Eleven"	2021	Ive	Eleven
"Kitchen Song"	2022	Tessa Violet	My God!
"Minor Feelings"	2022	Rina Sawayama	Hold the Girl
"This Hell"	2022	Rina Sawayama	Hold the Girl
"Your Age"	2022	Rina Sawayama	Hold the Girl
"Imagining"	2022	Rina Sawayama	Hold the Girl
"Frankenstein"	2022	Rina Sawayama	Hold the Girl
"Send My Love to John"	2022	Rina Sawayama	Hold the Girl
"Phantom"	2022	Rina Sawayama	Hold the Girl
"To Be Alive"	2022	Rina Sawayama	Hold the Girl
"20 Something"	2022	Fletcher	Girl of My Dreams (Deluxe)
"Sadtown USA"	2022	Carol Ades	Sadtown USA
"Sunny Disposition"	2022	Carol Ades	Sadtown USA
"Beautiful Liar"	2023	Monsta X	Reason
"Performer"	2023	Rebecca Black	Let Her Burn
"Slutphase"	2023	Ber	Halfway
"Hypnosis"	2023	Ive	I've Ive
"Sodom & Gomorrah"	2023	Dorian Electra	Fanfare
"Tiny Little Titties"	2023	Corook	Serious Person (Part 1)
"Free"	2023	Carol Ades	Non-album single
"Kiss Ur Face Forever"	2023	Orla Gartland	Everybody Needs a Hero
"Galileo"	2023	Kep1er	Magic Hour
"Either Way"	2023	Ive	I've Mine
"Baddie"	2023	Ive	I've Mine
"Holy Moly"	2023	Ive	I've Mine
"Perfect Night"	2023	Le Sserafim	Non-album single
"Backwards"	2023	Weeekly	ColoRise
"Girls of the Year"	2024	Vcha	Non-album single
"Magnetic"	2024	Illit	Super Real Me
"Ice Queen"	2024	Ive	Ive Switch
"Bet"	2024	Mette	Non-album single
"Curious"	2024	Unis	Curious
"Dreams"	2024	Carol Ades	Late Start
"Everything Else Is Just Noise"	2024	Carol Ades	Late Start
"Hope Is a Scary Thing"	2024	Carol Ades	Late Start
"Furniture"	2024	Carol Ades	Late Start
"Mom Song"	2024	Carol Ades	Late Start
"Better Than You Found Me"	2024	Carol Ades	Late Start
"Dreams (Reprise)"	2024	Carol Ades	Late Start
"Backseat Driver"	2024	Orla Gartland	Everybody Needs a Hero
"The Hit"	2024	Orla Gartland	Everybody Needs a Hero
"Everybody Needs a Hero"	2024	Orla Gartland	Everybody Needs a Hero
"Billionaire"	2024	Babymonster	Drip
"Kiss My Troubles Away"	2024	TWICE	Strategy
"Salvation"	2025	Rebecca Black	Salvation
"Tears In My Pocket"	2025	Rebecca Black	Salvation
"Do You Even Think About Me?"	2025	Rebecca Black	Salvation
"Death"	2025	Corook	Committed to a Bit
"Fix"	2025	Lyn Lapid	Buzzkill
"Bamsopoong" (밤소풍)	2025	Illit	Bomb
"Deja Vu"	2025	Rescene	Dearest
"Hot Sauce"	2025	Babymonster	Non-album single
"It Girl"	2025	Jade	That's Showbiz Baby
"Plastic Box"	2025	Jade	That's Showbiz Baby
"Natural at Disaster"	2025	Jade	That's Showbiz Baby
"Glitch"	2025	Jade	That's Showbiz Baby
"XOXO"	2025	Maude Latour	Sugar Water (Deluxe)
"Sailor 99"	2025	Maude Latour	Sugar Water (Deluxe)
"The Hell of April"	2025	Sody	The Hell of April
"We Go Up"	2025	Babymonster	We Go Up
"Supa Dupa Love"	2025	Babymonster	We Go Up
"Wild"	2025	Babymonster	We Go Up
"Podium"	2025	Nmixx	Blue Valentine
"Worst Person in the World"	2025	Carol Ades	Worst Person in the World
"Ponytail"	2025	XO	Fashionably Late
"Limoncello"	2026	Chuu	XO, My Cyberlove
"Fireworks"	2026	Ive	Revive+
"Super Icy" (Leeseo solo)	2026	Ive	Revive+
"That's My Girl"	2026	Carol Ades	Worst Person in the World
"Familiar Hell"	2026	Carol Ades	Worst Person in the World
"Choom"	2026	Babymonster	Choom
"I Like It"	2026	Babymonster	Choom
"Locked In"	2026	Babymonster	Choom
"Undiscovered"	2026	Grace Enger	Satisfied Girl
"Fangirl"	2026	Aespa	Kiss n Tell
"Small World"	2026	Mette	Coming of Age
"Exhibitionism"	2026	Rebecca Black	Age of the Exhibitionist
"Michael."	2026	Rebecca Black	Age of the Exhibitionist
"Visions Again"	2026	Rebecca Black	Age of the Exhibitionist
"Waschesalon"	2026	Rebecca Black	Age of the Exhibitionist
