= Either Way (Ive song) =

Single by Ive

from the EP I've Mine
- Language: Korean; English
- Released: September 25, 2023
- Genre: K-pop
- Length: 2:47
- Label: Starship; Kakao; Columbia
- Composers: Ryan S. Jhun; Luke Fitton; Lauren Aquilina; Liam O'Donnell
- Lyricist: Sunwoo Jung-a

Ive singles chronology
"Wave" (2023)	"Either Way" (2023)	"Off the Record" (2023)

Music video
- "Either Way" on YouTube

"Either Way" is a song recorded by South Korean girl group Ive. It was released by Starship Entertainment as the first single from the group's first Korean extended play I've Mine on September 25, 2023.

== Background and release ==
On September 3, 2023, Starship Entertainment announced Ive would be releasing their second extended play I've Mine on October 13. It was also announced that I've Mine would have three singles with "Either Way" pre-released on September 25, "Off the Record" pre-released on October 6, and "Baddie" scheduled to be released together with the extended play on October 13. The song was released alongside its music video on September 25.

== Composition ==
"Either Way" was written by Sunwoo Jung-a, composed and arranged by Ryan S. Jhun, and Luke Fitton, with Lauren Aquilina, and Liam O'Donnell participating in the composition. It was described as a song with "a dreamy synth and lyrical atmosphere" with lyrics about "being free from other people's gaze". "Either Way" was composed in the key of A-flat major, with a tempo of 123 beats per minute.

== Commercial performance ==
"Either Way" debuted at number 14 on South Korea's Circle Digital Chart in the chart issue dated September 24–30, 2023. The song ascended to number three in the chart issue dated October 15–21, 2023, It also debuted at number ten on the Billboard South Korea Songs in the chart issue dated October 14, 2023. In Japan, the song debuted at number 80 on the Billboard Japan Hot 100 in the chart issue dated October 4, 2023.

In Singapore, "Either Way" debuted at number 27 on the RIAS Top Streaming Chart in the chart issue dated September 29 – October 5, 2023. It also debuted at number 22 on the RIAS Top Regional Chart in the chart issue dated September 22–28, 2023, ascending to number ten in the following week. In Hong Kong, the song debuted at number 21 on the Billboard Hong Kong Songs in the chart issue dated October 14, 2023. In Taiwan, the song debuted at number 24 on the Billboard Taiwan Songs in the chart issue dated October 14, 2023.

In the United States, "Either Way" debuted at number eight on the Billboard World Digital Song Sales in the chart issue dated October 7, 2023. In New Zealand, the song debuted at number 38 on the RMNZ Hot Singles in the chart issue dated October 2, 2023. Globally, the song debuted at number 177 on the Billboard Global 200 in the chart issue dated October 14, 2023, ascending to number 160 in the chart issue dated October 28, 2023. It also debuted at number 182 on the Billboard Global Excl. U.S. in the chart issue dated October 7, 2023, ascending to number 86 in the chart issue dated October 28, 2023.

== Music video ==
The music video directed by Yoo Kwang-goong was released alongside the song by Starship Entertainment on September 25. Shot on film stock by cinematographer Han Da-som, the "coming of age" visual depicts "the members' finding their true self amidst misunderstandings caused by the gazes of countless others" with scenes that switches between "the member's everyday life and fantasy space".

== Accolades ==
Music program awards for "Either Way"
Program	Date	Ref.
Inkigayo	October 29, 2023	

== Charts ==
=== Weekly charts ===
Weekly chart performance for "Either Way"
Chart (2023)	Peak position
Global 200 (Billboard)	160
Hong Kong (Billboard)	21
Japan (Japan Hot 100)	80
New Zealand Hot Singles (RMNZ)	38
Singapore (RIAS)	27
South Korea (Circle)	3
Taiwan (Billboard)	24
US World Digital Song Sales (Billboard)	8

=== Monthly charts ===
Monthly chart performance for "Either Way"
Chart (2023)	Position
South Korea (Circle)	5

=== Year-end charts ===
2023 year-end chart performance for "Either Way"
Chart (2023)	Position
South Korea (Circle)	115

2024 year-end chart performance for "Either Way"
Chart (2024)	Position
South Korea (Circle)	176

== Release history ==
Release history for "Either Way"
Region	Date	Format	Label
Various	September 25, 2023	Digital download; streaming	Starship; Kakao; Columbia
