= Sunwoo Jung-a =

South Korean singer and songwriter

- 선우정아
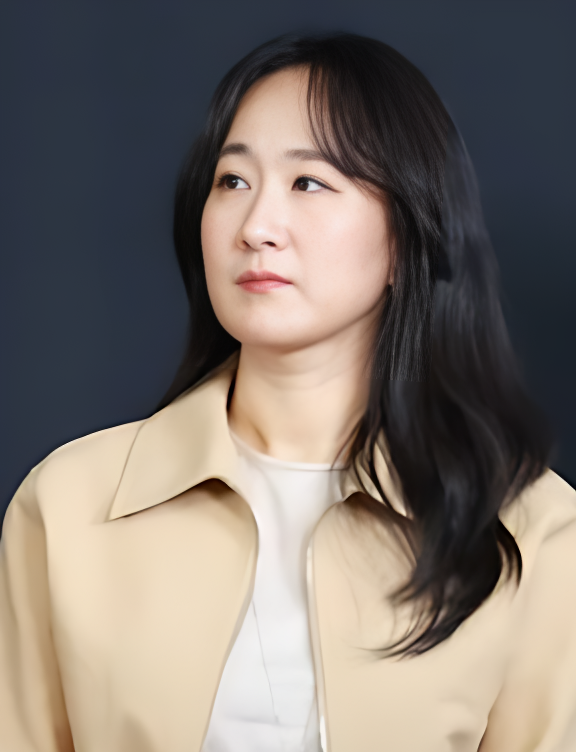
- Sunwoo in April 2024
- Born: May 11, 1985 (age 41); Hanam, Gyeonggi Province, South Korea
- Occupation: Singer
- Musical career
- Genres: Ballad; R&B; dance; jazz; indie; soul; blues; pop
- Instrument: Vocals
- Years active: 2006–present
- Label: Magic Strawberry Sound
- Website: www.msbsound.com

Korean name
- Hangul: 선우정아
- Hanja: 鮮于貞娥
- RR: Seonu Jeonga
- MR: Sŏnu Chŏnga

Sunwoo Jung-a (Korean: 선우정아, born May 11, 1985), stylized as Sunwoojunga, is a South Korean musician, singer-songwriter, and record producer who has worked with numerous Korean artists including IU, Suran, GD & TOP, 2NE1, Lee Haeri, Lee Hi, and San E. She released her debut album Masstige on May 10, 2006.

== Discography ==
=== Studio albums ===
Title	Album details	Peak chart positions	Sales
Title	Album details	KOR	Sales
Masstige	Released: May 10, 2006; Label: Ogam Entertainment; Formats: CD, cassette	—	—N/a
It's Okay, Dear	Released: April 2, 2013; Label: Magic Strawberry Sound; Formats: CD, digital download	—	—N/a
Riano Poom with Yeom Shin-hye	Released: December 4, 2014; Label: Magic Strawberry Sound; Formats: CD, digital download	90	—N/a
Serenade	Released: December 12, 2019; Label: Magic Strawberry Sound; Formats: CD, digital download, streaming	46	—N/a
Beyond	Released: November 6, 2024; Label: Magic Strawberry Sound; Formats: CD, digital download, streaming	99	KOR: 835

=== Extended plays ===
Title	Album details	Peak chart positions	Sales
Title	Album details	KOR	Sales
4X4	Released: September 26, 2016; Label: Magic Strawberry Sound; Formats: CD, digital download	76	—N/a
After My Death OST (죄 많은 소녀 OST)	Released: September 14, 2018; Label: Magic Strawberry Sound; Formats: CD, digital download	—	—N/a
Stand	Released: May 30, 2019; Label: Magic Strawberry Sound; Formats: CD, digital download	60	—N/a
Stunning	Released: August 25, 2019; Label: Magic Strawberry Sound; Formats: CD, digital download	90	—N/a

=== Singles ===
Title	Year	Peak chart positions	Sales (DL)	Album
Title	Year	KOR	Sales (DL)	Album
"Purity" (순수)	2006	—	—N/a	Masstige
"The Moment I Destroy You" (당신을 파괴하는 순간)	2013	—	—N/a	It's Okay, Dear
"A Song of Hero" (주인공의 노래)	2013	—	—N/a	It's Okay, Dear
"Baepsae" (뱁새)	2013	—	—N/a	It's Okay, Dear
"Rush" with Kafka	2013	—	—N/a	Non-album single
"Blossom" with Yeom Shin-hye	2014	—	—N/a	Riano Poom
"Spring Girls" (봄처녀)	2014	—	—N/a	Non-album singles
"Summer Camp" (여름캠프 마지막 밤) with Danny Arens, Jinbo	2015	—	—N/a	Non-album singles
"Hello" (입김) with Jung Yong-hwa	2016	45	KOR: 81,049	Empathy single album
"Fireworks" (불꽃놀이) with Jung Yong-hwa	2016	—	KOR: 16,283	Empathy single album
"Stay Put" (그러려니)	2016	—	—N/a	Non-album single
"Sooni" (순이)	2016	—	—N/a	4X4
"Hot and Cold" (츤데레) feat. Yoon Cheol-jong	2016	—	—N/a	4X4
"Propose" (구애)	2017	—	—N/a	Non-album singles
"Cat" (고양이) feat. IU	2017	64	KOR: 33,355	Non-album singles
"Fine" (남)	2018	—	—N/a	Non-album singles
"Outside the Chart" (차트밖에서) with The Barberettes	2018	—	—N/a	Non-album singles
"Eternity" (백년해로)	2018	—	—N/a	Non-album singles
"Heaven Is Mine" (천국은 나의 것)	2018	—	—N/a	Non-album singles
"Sam Sam" (쌤쌤)	2019	—	—N/a	Stand
"Classic"	2019	—	—N/a	Stunning
"Run with Me"	2020	114	—N/a	Serenade
"Serenade"	2020	—	—N/a	Serenade
"Idle Idle" (뒹굴뒹굴)	2020	—	—N/a	Idle Idle single album
"Idle Idle (Piano Trio ver.)" (뒹굴뒹굴 (Piano Trio ver.))	2020	—	—N/a	Our Spring That Rolled and Rolled Over single album
"So We for Now" (우리 이제)	2020	—	—N/a	The late Kim Hyun-sik's 30th anniversary dedication album "Make memories" Part 4
"In the Bed" (동거)	2021	—	—N/a	Non-album single
"—" denotes releases that did not chart.

=== Other charted songs ===
Title	Year	Peak chart positions	Sales (DL)	Album
Title	Year	KOR	Sales (DL)	Album
"To My Ex-Girlfriend" (전 여자친구에게) San E feat. Sunwoo Jung-a	2013	24	KOR: 232,637	Not Based on a True Story
"Always Being Strangers" (언제나 타인) with Toy	2014	24	KOR: 119,990+	Da Capo
"Boredom Addiction" (권태중독) MC Mong feat. Sunwoo Jung-a	2015	8	KOR: 181,458	Song For You
"Secret Garden" IU feat. Sunwoo Jung-a (uncredited)	2017	10	KOR: 466,059	A Flower Bookmark 2
"In Seoul" Epik High feat. Sunwoo Jung-a	2019	8	—N/a	Sleepless in
"Hitch Hiding" Heize feat Sunwoo Jung-a	2019	161	—N/a	She's Fine
"—" denotes releases that did not chart.

=== Soundtrack appearances ===
Title	Year	Album
"Love Is Like the Rain Over the Window" (사랑은 창밖에 빗물 같아요)	2007	Two Faces of My Girlfriend OST
"City Sunset"	2016	On the Way to the Airport OST
"Pretend Not to Know" (모른 척)	2017	Queen of Mystery OST
"Journey" (여정)	2018	Mother OST
"Upside Down (2018 Ver.)" (삐뚤어졌어 (2018 Ver.))	2018	Just One Bite OST
"Now Young-Hee Is"	2018	After My Death OST
"Only He" (오직)	2019	Save Me 2 OST
"Embrace" (온기)	2020	Nobody Knows OST
"You Can't Stop It from Bloomming" (꽃이 피는 걸 막을 순 없어요)	2020	The King: Eternal Monarch OST
"Crisis"	2020	Stranger 2 OST
"Sunset" (노을)	2020	Hush OST
"Island" (섬)	2020	No, Thank You OST
"Time to Realize"	2020	Maple Story M OST
"Your Eyes"	2021	L.U.C.A.: The Beginning OST
"The Road" (향해)	2021	Beyond Evil OST
"Timing"	2021	Yumi's Cells OST
"Beyond My Dreams" (상상)	2022	Extraordinary Attorney Woo OST Part.2
"Tell Me" (말해요)	2023	Agency OST

== Production credits ==
Year	Artist(s)	Song	Role
2010	2NE1	"It Hurts (Slow)"	co-composer, co-lyricist
2010	GD & TOP	"Oh Yeah (feat. Park Bom)"	co-composer
2010	GD & TOP	"What Do You Want?" (어쩌란 말이냐?; Eojjeoran Marinya?; G-Dragon solo)	co-composer
2013	Lee Hi	"One Sided Love"	lyricist, composer
2013	Lee Hi	"Am I Strange?"	lyricist, composer
2016	Junsu	"Is You..."	co-lyricist, composer
2017	Lee Haeri	"Pattern"	co-lyricist, co-composer
2017	IU	"Jam Jam"	composer, co-lyricist, co-arranger
2017	IU	"Secret Garden"	arranger, composer
2018	Nam Tae-hyun	"Star”	lyricist
2018	Jung Eun-ji	"The Box”	lyricist, arranger
2018	Lee Moon-sae	"Between Us" (우리 사이)	co-lyricist, co-arranger, background vocals
2018	Mothervibes	"Hippie Morning" (히피의 아침)	background vocals
2018	Lena Park	"The End"	lyricist
2020	Kim Sejeong	"Plant"	composer, producer, lyricist
2020	Kim Sung-kyu	"Room"	co-lyricist, co-composer, co-arranger
2022	Hyuna	"Dinga Dinga"	co-lyricist, co-composer, co-arranger
2022	Huh	"Ugly Duckling"	co-lyricist, co-arranger
2023	Sandara Park	"Play!"	co-lyricist
2023	Sandara Park	"Happy Ending"	co-lyricist, co-composer, co-arranger
2023	Ive	"Either Way"	lyricist

== Filmography ==
=== TV programs ===
Year	Title Program	Episode	Song title
2017–2018	King of Mask Singer	129	"Myself Reflected in My Heart" (내 마음에 비친 내 모습) (duet with Jo Woo-Jong)
2017–2018	King of Mask Singer	130	"Um Ah Oh Yeah" (Mamamoo) "Whistle" (Blackpink)
2017–2018	King of Mask Singer	132	"Dear" (The Man from Nowhere OST) (Mad Soul Child)
2017–2018	King of Mask Singer	134	"Winter Rain" (Sinawe)
2017–2018	King of Mask Singer	136	"The Innocent Macho" (Parasian)
2017–2018	King of Mask Singer	138	"Reset" (Toy ft. Lee Juck)
2017–2018	King of Mask Singer	140	"Peek-a-boo" (Red Velvet)
2017–2018	King of Mask Singer	145–146, 171–172	As panelist
2018	KPOP Cover Battle	–	"My Day" (Lena Park)

=== Web series ===
Year	Title	Role	Notes	Ref.
2023	One Day Off	Bodhisattva	Cameo	

== Awards and nominations ==
Year	Award	Category	Nominated work	Result	Ref.
2014	Korean Music Awards	Musician of the Year	—N/a	Won	
2014	Korean Music Awards	Best Pop Album	It's Okay, Dear	Won	
2014	Korean Music Awards	Album of the Year	It's Okay, Dear	Nominated	
2016	Korean Music Awards	Best Pop Song	"Spring Girls" (봄처녀)	Nominated	
2020	Korean Music Awards	Best R&B & Soul Song	"Classic"	Nominated	
2021	Korean Music Awards	Best R&B & Soul Album	Serenade	Won	
2021	Korean Music Awards	Musician of the Year	—N/a	Nominated	
2021	Korean Music Awards	Album of the Year	Serenade	Nominated	
2021	Korean Music Awards	Song of the Year	"Run With Me" (도망가자)	Nominated	
2021	Korean Music Awards	Best R&B & Soul Song	"Run With Me" (도망가자)	Nominated	
2022	Golden Melody Awards	Best Composer - Vocal Category	Aroma	Nominated	
