= Ive Empathy =

- Digital cover

EP by Ive
- Released: February 3, 2025
- Length: 18:42
- Languages: Korean; English
- Labels: Starship; Kakao; Columbia

Ive chronology
Alive (2024)	Ive Empathy (2025)	Be Alright (2025)

Singles from Ive Empathy
- 1. "Rebel Heart" Released: January 13, 2025; 2. "Attitude" Released: February 3, 2025

Ive Empathy is the third Korean-language extended play (EP) and fifth overall by South Korean girl group Ive. It was released by Starship Entertainment on February 3, 2025, and contains six tracks, including two singles "Rebel Heart" and "Attitude".

== Background and release ==
On December 1, 2024, Starship announced that Ive would be releasing new music in January 2025. On December 24, Ive's third EP, Ive Empathy, was announced to be released on February 3, 2025, following the release of its first single on January 13. A day later, during Ive's performance at the 2024 SBS Gayo Daejeon, a short audio clip of the single was unveiled. The single's title, "Rebel Heart", was announced on December 28. The following day, as a response to the Jeju Air Flight 2216 crash, Starship announced that the release of promotional material for the EP would be postponed to later dates.

On January 5, 2025, an updated promotion schedule was unveiled, with some planned promotional material removed. Later that same day, a concept trailer for the EP was released. Concept photos were released from January 5 to 11. "Rebel Heart", alongside its music video, was released on January 13. The EP's track listing was unveiled a day later, with the second single announced as "Attitude". A concept film for "Attitude" was released on January 26, presenting the members in a room resembling a typical home with unusual situations, while a piece of oldie music plays in the foreground.

== Track listing ==
Track listing for Ive Empathy
No.	Title	Lyrics	Music	Arrangement	Length
1.	"Rebel Heart"	Nietzsche	Emily Harbakk; Ryan S. Jhun; Thomas Gustafsson; Jimmy Jansson; Maia Wright; Jack Brady; Jordan Roman	Ryan S. Jhun; Gucci Caliente; The Wavys	3:08
2.	"Flu"	Hwang Yu-bin (XYXX)	Kim Ju-hyeong; Nok; Ryan S. Jhun; Maria Marcus; Christian Fast	Kim Ju-hyeong; Nok; Ryan S. Jhun	3:09
3.	"You Wanna Cry"	Exy	Jason Hahs; Ryan S. Jhun; Lauren Isenberg; Shannon Rubicam	Ryan S. Jhun; Jahs	2:54
4.	"Thank U"	Liz; Youra (Full8loom)	Thomas Baxter; Ryan S. Jhun; Cleo Tighe	Ryan S. Jhun; Thomas Baxter	3:11
5.	"Attitude"	Seo Ji-eum; Nietzsche; Jang Won-young	James Lewis; Ryan S. Jhun; Suzanne Vega; Roland Spreckley; Olga Sundin; Lotte Mørkved	Ryan S. Jhun; James Lewis	3:14
6.	"TKO"	Jo Yoon-kyung	Sean Fischer; Ryan S. Jhun; David Charles Fischer; Sofia Kay; John Mavrogiannis	Ryan S. Jhun; Sean Fischer	3:06
Total length:					18:42

Notes

- "You Wanna Cry" contains an interpolation of "I Wanna Dance with Somebody (Who Loves Me)", composed by Shannon Rubicam and performed by Whitney Houston.
- "Attitude" contains an interpolation of "Tom's Diner", written and performed by Suzanne Vega.

== Charts ==
=== Weekly charts ===
Weekly chart performance for Ive Empathy
Chart (2025)	Peak position
Croatian International Albums (HDU)	20
Japanese Albums (Oricon)	3
Japanese Combined Albums (Oricon)	2
Japanese Hot Albums (Billboard Japan)	21
Polish Albums (ZPAV)	61
South Korean Albums (Circle)	1
US World Albums (Billboard)	22

=== Monthly charts ===
Monthly chart performance for Ive Empathy
Chart (2025)	Position
Japanese Albums (Oricon)	11
South Korean Albums (Circle)	1

=== Year-end charts ===
Year-end chart performance for Ive Empathy
Chart (2025)	Position
Japanese Albums (Oricon)	72
South Korean Albums (Circle)	7

== Certifications ==
Certifications for Ive Empathy
Region	Certification	Certified units/sales
South Korea (KMCA)	Million	1,000,000^{^}
^{^} Shipments figures based on certification alone.

== Release history ==
Release history for Ive Empathy
Region	Date	Format	Label
South Korea	February 3, 2025	CD	Starship; Kakao; Columbia
Various	February 3, 2025	Digital download; streaming	Starship; Kakao; Columbia
