= Ive Switch =

- Digital cover

EP by Ive
- Released: April 29, 2024
- Length: 18:13
- Languages: Korean; English
- Labels: Starship; Kakao; Columbia

Ive chronology
I've Mine (2023)	Ive Switch (2024)	Alive (2024)

Singles from Ive Switch
- 1. "Heya" Released: April 29, 2024; 2. "Accendio" Released: May 15, 2024

Ive Switch is the second Korean-language extended play and third overall by South Korean girl group Ive. It was released by Starship Entertainment on April 29, 2024, and contains six tracks including two singles "Heya" and "Accendio".

== Background and release ==
On April 3, 2024, Starship Entertainment announced that Ive would be releasing their second extended play titled Ive Switch on April 29. On April 10, the promotional schedule was released. On April 20, the track listing was released with "Heya" and "Accendio" announced as the lead singles. A day later, a motion teaser for "Heya" was released, followed by the music video teaser on April 24. On April 28, the highlight medley teaser video was released. The extended play was released alongside the music video for "Heya" on April 29. The music video for "Accendio" was released on May 15.

== Critical reception ==
Professional ratings
Review scores
Source	Rating
IZM	3/5 stars

Jang Jun-hwan, writing for IZM, praised the album, describing it as "an indicator of Ive's cautiousness, the secret to their longevity". Jang noted that the album carefully follows trends to add to their "familiar maximalist pop", such as the metallic synth in "Accendio" and the drums and bass in "Blue Heart".

== Promotion ==
Following the release of Ive Switch, on April 29, 2024, Ive held a live event on YouTube aimed at introducing the extended play and its tracks, and connecting with their fanbase.

== Track listing ==
Track listing for Ive Switch
No.	Title	Lyrics	Music	Arrangement	Length
1.	"Heya" (해야; Haeya; lit. 'Sun!')	Lee Seu-ran; Exy; Sohlhee	Ryan S. Jhun; Dwayne Abernathy Jr.; Ido Nadjar; Kloe Latimer; Jack Brady; Jordan Roman	Ryan S. Jhun; Dem Jointz; Ido Nadjar; The Wavys	3:10
2.	"Accendio"	Gaeko; Seo Jeong-ah; Seo Ji-eum	Ryan S. Jhun; Christopher Smith; Alexis Andrea Boyd; Lise Sofie Reppe; Benjamin Samama; Jack Brady; Jordan Roman	Ryan S. Jhun; Risc; The Wavys	3:12
3.	"Blue Heart"	Jang Won-young	Ryan S. Jhun; Max Thulin; Louise Udin; Mathilde Clara Nyegaard	Ryan S. Jhun; Max Thulin	3:08
4.	"Ice Queen"	Seo Ji-eum	Ryan S. Jhun; Jack Brady; Jordan Roman; Lauren Aquilina; Roland Spreckley	Ryan S. Jhun; The Wavys	3:03
5.	"Wow"	Lee Seu-ran	Ryan S. Jhun; Charlie McClean; Kristine Marie Skolem; Roland Spreckley	Ryan S. Jhun; Charlie McClean	2:59
6.	"Reset"	Seo Jeong-ah	Ryan S. Jhun; Tre Jean-Marie; Fanny Hultman; Kloe Latimer	Ryan S. Jhun; Tre Jean-Marie	2:41
Total length:					18:13

== Charts ==
=== Weekly charts ===
Weekly chart performance for Ive Switch
Chart (2024)	Peak position
Hungarian Physical Albums (MAHASZ)	29
Japanese Albums (Oricon)	3
Japanese Combined Albums (Oricon)	3
Japanese Hot Albums (Billboard Japan)	12
Nigerian Albums (TurnTable)	76
South Korean Albums (Circle)	2

=== Monthly charts ===
Monthly chart performance for Ive Switch
Chart (2024)	Position
Japanese Albums (Oricon)	10
South Korean Albums (Circle)	3

=== Year-end charts ===
Year-end chart performance for Ive Switch
Chart (2024)	Position
Japanese Albums (Oricon)	64
South Korean Albums (Circle)	9

== Certifications ==
Certifications for Ive Switch
Region	Certification	Certified units/sales
South Korea (KMCA)	Million	1,000,000^{^}
^{^} Shipments figures based on certification alone.

== Release history ==
Release history for Ive Switch
Region	Date	Format	Label
South Korea	April 29, 2024	CD	Starship; Kakao; Columbia
Various	April 29, 2024	Digital download; streaming	Starship; Kakao; Columbia
