= Off the Record (Ive song) =

- Promotional poster

Single by Ive

from the EP I've Mine
- Language: Korean; English
- Released: October 6, 2023
- Genre: K-pop
- Length: 3:09
- Label: Starship; Kakao; Columbia
- Composers: Ryan S. Jhun; Sivert Hagtvet Hjeltnes; Bård Bonsaken; Hilda Stenmalm
- Lyricist: Seo Ji-eum
- Producers: Ryan S. Jhun; Sivert Hagtvet Hjeltnes; Bård Bonsaken

Ive singles chronology
"Either Way" (2023)	"Off the Record" (2023)	"Baddie" (2023)

Music video
- "Off the Record" on YouTube

"Off the Record" is a song recorded by South Korean girl group Ive. It was released by Starship Entertainment as the second single from the group's first Korean extended play I've Mine on October 6, 2023.

== Background and release ==
On September 3, 2023, Starship Entertainment announced Ive would be releasing their second extended play I've Mine on October 13. It was also announced that I've Mine would have three singles with "Either Way" pre-released on September 25, "Off the Record" pre-released on October 6, and "Baddie" scheduled to be released together with the extended play on October 13. On October 1, a teaser video was released. The song was released alongside its music video on October 6.

== Composition ==
"Off the Record" was written by Seo Ji-eum, composed and arranged by Ryan S. Jhun, and Sivert Hagtvet Hjeltnes, with Bård Bonsaken, and Hilda Stenmalm participating in the composition. It was described as a song with "rhythmic beat" characterized by "groovy and heavy bass guitar" with lyrics that "tells the story of girls who are curious about love in the middle of the night when no one is sleeping". "Off the Record" was composed in the key of B-flat major, with a tempo of 108 beats per minute.

== Commercial performance ==
"Off the Record" debuted at number 106 on South Korea's Circle Digital Chart in the chart issue dated October 1–7, 2023. The song ascended to number 14 in the chart issue dated October 15–21, 2023.

In Singapore, the song debuted at number 17 on the RIAS Top Streaming Chart, and number nine on the RIAS Top Regional Chart in the chart issue dated October 6–12, 2023. It also debuted at number 16 on the Billboard Singapore Songs in the chart issue dated October 21, 2023. In Malaysia, the song debuted at number 25 on the Billboard Malaysia Songs in the chart issue dated October 21, 2023. In Hong Kong, the song debuted at number 11 on the Billboard Hong Kong Songs in the chart issue dated October 21, 2023. In Taiwan, the song debuted at number 13 on the Billboard Taiwan Songs in the chart issue dated October 21, 2023.

In the United States, "Off the Record" debuted at number ten on the Billboard World Digital Song Sales in the chart issue dated October 21, 2023. In New Zealand, the song debuted at number 38 on the RMNZ Hot Singles in the chart issue dated October 16, 2023. Globally, the song debuted at number 181 on the Billboard Global 200 in the chart issue dated October 21, 2023. It also debuted at number 99 on the Billboard Global Excl. U.S. in the chart issue dated October 21, 2023.

== Music video ==
The music video directed by Lee Hye-in was released alongside the song by Starship Entertainment on October 6. The visual was described as a "fantasy film" with a "highly completed storyline".

== Promotion ==
Following the release of I've Mine, Ive performed "Off the Record" on Mnet's M Countdown on October 19.

== Charts ==
=== Weekly charts ===
Weekly chart performance for "Off the Record"
Chart (2023)	Peak position
Global 200 (Billboard)	181
Hong Kong (Billboard)	11
Malaysia (Billboard)	25
New Zealand Hot Singles (RMNZ)	19
Singapore (RIAS)	17
South Korea (Circle)	14
Taiwan (Billboard)	13
US World Digital Song Sales (Billboard)	10
Vietnam (Vietnam Hot 100)	58

=== Monthly charts ===
Monthly chart performance for "Off the Record"
Chart (2023)	Position
South Korea (Circle)	20

=== Year-end charts ===
Year-end chart performance for "Off the Record"
Chart (2024)	Position
South Korea (Circle)	145

== Release history ==
Release history for "Off the Record"
Region	Date	Format	Label
Various	October 6, 2023	Digital download; streaming	Starship; Kakao; Columbia
