= I Want (song) =

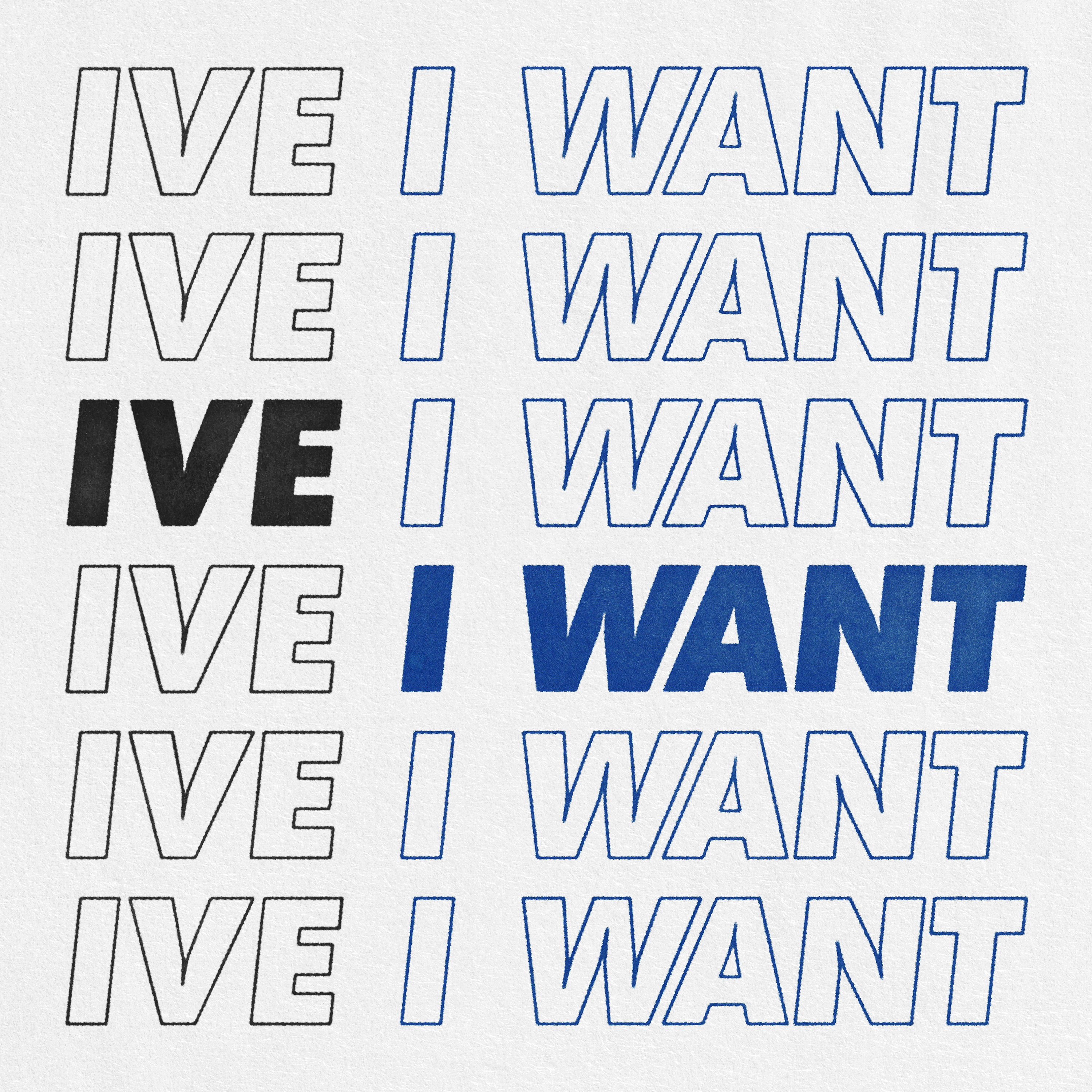

Promotional single by Ive
- Language: Korean
- Released: July 13, 2023
- Length: 3:00
- Label: Starship
- Songwriters: Jeong Min-ji; Myung Ji-eun; Oh Yoo-won; Ryan S. Jhun; Tyler Spry; Alida Peck; Alma Goodman; Sweetner
- Producers: Ryan S. Jhun; Tyler Spry; Alida Peck; Alma Goodman

Ive promotional singles chronology
"I Want" (2023)	"Summer Festa" (2024)

Music video
- "I Want" on YouTube

"I Want" is a song by South Korean girl group Ive, released as a Pepsi campaign song though Starship Entertainment on July 13, 2023. It was written by various contributors including Ryan S. Jhun, who had worked on many of the group's previous singles, while composition and arrangement was handled by Jhun, Tyler Spry, Alida Peck and Alma Goodman.

== Background and composition ==
Several Ive members have previously been brand ambassadors for Pepsi; Yujin was chosen as a brand ambassador in 2021, followed by Wonyoung and Leeseo in 2022. In the beginning of 2023, the group was chosen as Pepsi Zero Sugar's brand ambassador in South Korea. "I Want" features a "simple melody" with "unique" instrumentations and reinterprets "Pepsi's brand identity of 'fun,' 'food' and 'festa'", according to a press release by Pepsi Korea.

== Credits and personnel ==
Credits adapted from Melon.

- Ryan S. Jhun – lyricist, composer, arranger
- Tyler Spry – lyricist, composer, arranger
- Alida Peck – lyricist, composer
- Alma Goodman – lyricist, composer
- Jeong Min-ji – lyricist
- Myung Ji-eun – lyricist
- Oh Yoo-won – lyricist
- Sweetner – lyricist

== Charts ==
=== Weekly charts ===
Weekly chart performance for "I Want"
Chart (2023)	Peak position
South Korea (Circle)	35

=== Monthly charts ===
Monthly chart performance for "I Want"
Chart (2023)	Position
South Korea (Circle)	34

=== Year-end charts ===
Year-end chart performance for "I Want"
Chart (2023)	Position
South Korea (Circle)	164

== Release history ==
Release history for "I Want"
Region	Date	Format	Label	Ref.
Various	July 13, 2023	Digital download; streaming	Starship; Kakao; Columbia	
