= Baddie (song) =

- Promotional poster

Single by Ive

from the EP I've Mine
- Language: Korean; English
- Released: October 13, 2023
- Genre: Trap
- Length: 2:34
- Label: Starship; Kakao; Columbia
- Composers: Ryan S. Jhun; Christopher Smith; Fin Dow-Smith; Lauren Aquilina
- Lyricists: Big Naughty; Perrie; Ryan S. Jhun
- Producers: Ryan S. Jhun; Fin Dow-Smith; Risc

Ive singles chronology
"Off the Record" (2023)	"Baddie" (2023)	"All Night" (2024)

Music video
- "Baddie" on YouTube

"Baddie" is a song recorded by South Korean girl group Ive. It was released by Starship Entertainment as the third single from the group's first Korean extended play I've Mine on October 13, 2023. It is a trap song conveying the message of self-confidence, with lyrics written by Big Naughty, Perrie and Ryan S. Jhun, and composition handled by the latter with Christopher Smith, Fin Dow-Smith and Lauren Aquilina.

"Baddie" was a commercial success in South Korea and peaked at number one on the Circle Digital Chart for three weeks, becoming Ive's fifth number-one single on the chart. It also reached the top ten in Hong Kong and Singapore, and was certified gold in Japan. Ive promoted the song with live performances on various weekly South Korean music programs, including Music Bank, Show! Music Core, and Inkigayo.

== Background and release ==
On September 3, 2023, Starship Entertainment announced Ive would be releasing their second extended play I've Mine on October 13. It was also announced that I've Mine would have three singles with "Either Way" pre-released on September 25, "Off the Record" pre-released on October 6, and "Baddie" scheduled to be released together with the extended play on October 13. On October 8, a teaser video was released. The song was released alongside the extended play and its music video on October 13.

== Composition ==
"Baddie" is a trap single, written by Big Naughty, Perrie, and Ryan S. Jhun, composed by Ryan S. Jhun, Christopher Smith, Fin Dow-Smith, and Lauren Aquilina, and arranged by Ryan S. Jhun, Fin Dow-Smith, Risc, and Alawn. NME emphasized that "Baddie" serves as a versatile showcase of IVE’s diverse talents, similar to the previous single's 'Kitsch' beat drop. However, it boasts even more kitsch than its predecessors. It was described by Starship Entertainment as a 'dark charm' song led by a strong trap beat and electric bass rhythm, with lyrics conveying the message of self-confidence. In terms of musical notation, it was composed in the key of F major, with a tempo of 160 beats per minute.

== Commercial performance ==
"Baddie" debuted at number 80 on South Korea's Circle Digital Chart in the chart issue dated October 8–14, 2023. The single ascended to number one in the chart issue dated October 29 – November 4, 2023 and became Ive's fourth song to achieve a perfect all-kill (PAK) on Korean music charts. In Japan, the song debuted at number 21 on the Billboard Japan Hot 100 in the chart issue dated October 25, 2023. On the Oricon Combined Singles, the song debuted at number 22 in the chart issue dated October 30, 2023.

In Singapore, "Baddie" debuted at number ten on the RIAS Top Streaming Chart, and number five on the RIAS Top Regional Chart in the chart issue dated October 13–19, 2023. In Hong Kong, the song debuted at number nine on the Billboard Hong Kong Songs in the chart issue dated October 28, 2023. In Taiwan, the song debuted at number five on the Billboard Taiwan Songs in the chart issue dated October 28, 2023. In New Zealand, the song debuted at number 16 on the RMNZ Hot Singles in the chart issue dated October 23, 2023. Globally, the song debuted at number 85 on the Billboard Global 200 in the chart issue dated October 28, 2023, ascending to number 66 in the following week. It also debuted at number 45 on the Billboard Global Excl. U.S. in the chart issue dated October 28, 2023, ascending to number 34 in the following week.

== Promotion ==
Following the release of I've Mine, Ive performed "Baddie" on three music programs in the first week: KBS's Music Bank on October 13, MBC's Show! Music Core on October 14, and SBS's Inkigayo on October 15. In the second week of promotion, the group performed on three music programs: Mnet's M Countdown on October 19, Show! Music Core on October 21, and Inkigayo on October 22. In the third and final week of promotion, the group performed on three music programs: Music Bank on October 27, Show! Music Core on October 28, and Inkigayo on October 29.

== Credits and personnel ==
Credits adapted from Apple Music.

- Ive – vocals
- Perrie – background vocals, lyrics
- Ryan S. Jhun – producer, lyrics, composition, arrangement
- Fin Dow-Smith – producer, composition, arrangement
- Risc – producer, arrangement
- Big Naughty – lyrics
- Christopher Smith – composition
- Lauren Aquilina – composition
- Alawn – arrangement, mixing
- Grace Yang – recording
- Kim Min-hee – recording
- Lee Kyung-won – editing
- Nam Woo-kwon – mastering

== Accolades ==
Music program awards for "Baddie"
Program	Date	Ref.
Inkigayo	November 12, 2023	
Inkigayo	November 19, 2023	
Inkigayo	December 3, 2023	
M Countdown	October 26, 2023	
Show Champion	October 25, 2023	

== Charts ==
=== Weekly charts ===
Weekly chart performance for "Baddie"
Chart (2023)	Peak position
Global 200 (Billboard)	66
Hong Kong (Billboard)	9
Japan (Japan Hot 100)	21
Japan Combined Singles (Oricon)	22
New Zealand Hot Singles (RMNZ)	16
Singapore (RIAS)	10
South Korea (Circle)	1
Taiwan (Billboard)	5
Vietnam (Vietnam Hot 100)	89

=== Monthly charts ===
Monthly chart performance for "Baddie"
Chart (2023)	Position
South Korea (Circle)	1

=== Year-end charts ===
2023 year-end chart performance for "Baddie"
Chart (2023)	Position
South Korea (Circle)	111

2024 year-end chart performance for "Baddie"
Chart (2024)	Position
South Korea (Circle)	63

== Certifications ==
Certifications for "Baddie"
Region	Certification	Certified units/sales
Streaming
Japan (RIAJ)	Gold	50,000,000^{†}
^{†} Streaming-only figures based on certification alone.

== Release history ==
Release history for "Baddie"
Region	Date	Format	Label
Various	October 13, 2023	Digital download; streaming	Starship; Kakao; Columbia

== See also ==
- List of Inkigayo Chart winners (2023)
- List of M Countdown Chart winners (2023)
- List of Show Champion Chart winners (2023)
