= Various Cruelties =

English band

- Origin: Leeds, England
- Genres: Rock, pop, soul, Indie rock
- Years active: 2010–present
- Labels: Mercury, Almanac
- Members: Liam O'Donnell; Beanie Bhebhe; Adam Coney; Dean Valentine Smith
- Website: variouscruelties.com

Various Cruelties are a four-piece London-based band described as "Motown-influenced pop." Formed in 2010, Various Cruelties received early acclaim based on a self-released limited-edition single, "If It Wasn't For You," and signed with Mercury Records. In 2011, Various Cruelties released three singles, and in October 2012, they released their debut album on their own label, Almanac Recordings. Various Cruelties are recognised for the song "If It Wasn't For You," which was used in a 2012 holiday commercial for Zales, and for high-profile performances with Kasabian, The Vaccines, and Mumford and Sons, among others.

== History ==
Various Cruelties is led by Liam O'Donnell, a songwriter who became successful with credits on tracks such as Fall Out Boy's "Uma Thurman", and MAX's "Lights Down Low". He is also a distant relative of Oscar Wilde. Born in London to a Scottish father and an Irish mother, O'Donnell moved to Leeds in Northern England as a teenager, and began performing as a singer/songwriter. He chose the stage name Various Cruelties after seeing a painting of the same name by American artist Ed Ruscha. "It seemed to resonate with my character and the music I was trying to make," O'Donnell said. "It seemed to fit perfectly."

After moving to London in 2010, O'Donnell decided against performing as a solo artist and began to assemble the band that would become the current incarnation of Various Cruelties. He met Beanie Bhebhe (vocals/bass/beats), Adam Coney (guitar/vocals) and Dean Valentine (drums) in London in September 2010, and in December they played their first show, supporting the Vaccines at the infamous Madam Jo Jo's. By May 2011, Various Cruelties had recorded and self-released two singles, "If It Wasn't For You" and "Neon Truth," and had been embraced by UK audiences and the media. Before the end of the year, they'd performed alongside Metallica, Lou Reed, Steve Earle and Nile Rodgers on Later... with Jools Holland, and signed with Mercury Records.

Various Cruelties eponymous debut was recorded in Los Angeles with producer Tony Hoffer, known for his work with Foster the People, Beck, and Goldfrapp. It was released in October 2012, and included the original recording of "If It Wasn't For You," which was used in a December 2012 North American holiday campaign for Zales Jewelry.

Various Cruelties have continued to tour in the United Kingdom since the release of the album, and embarked on their first US tour in February 2013.

== Discography ==
=== Albums ===
- Various Cruelties Almanac Recordings, October 2012

=== Singles ===
- "Neon Truth" Mercury/Universal, April 2012
- "Great Unknown" Mercury/Universal, January 2012
- "Chemicals" Mercury/Universal, September 2011
- "Neon Truth" Independent, May 2011
- "If It Wasn't For You" Independent, January 2011
