= Ive (group) =

South Korean girl group

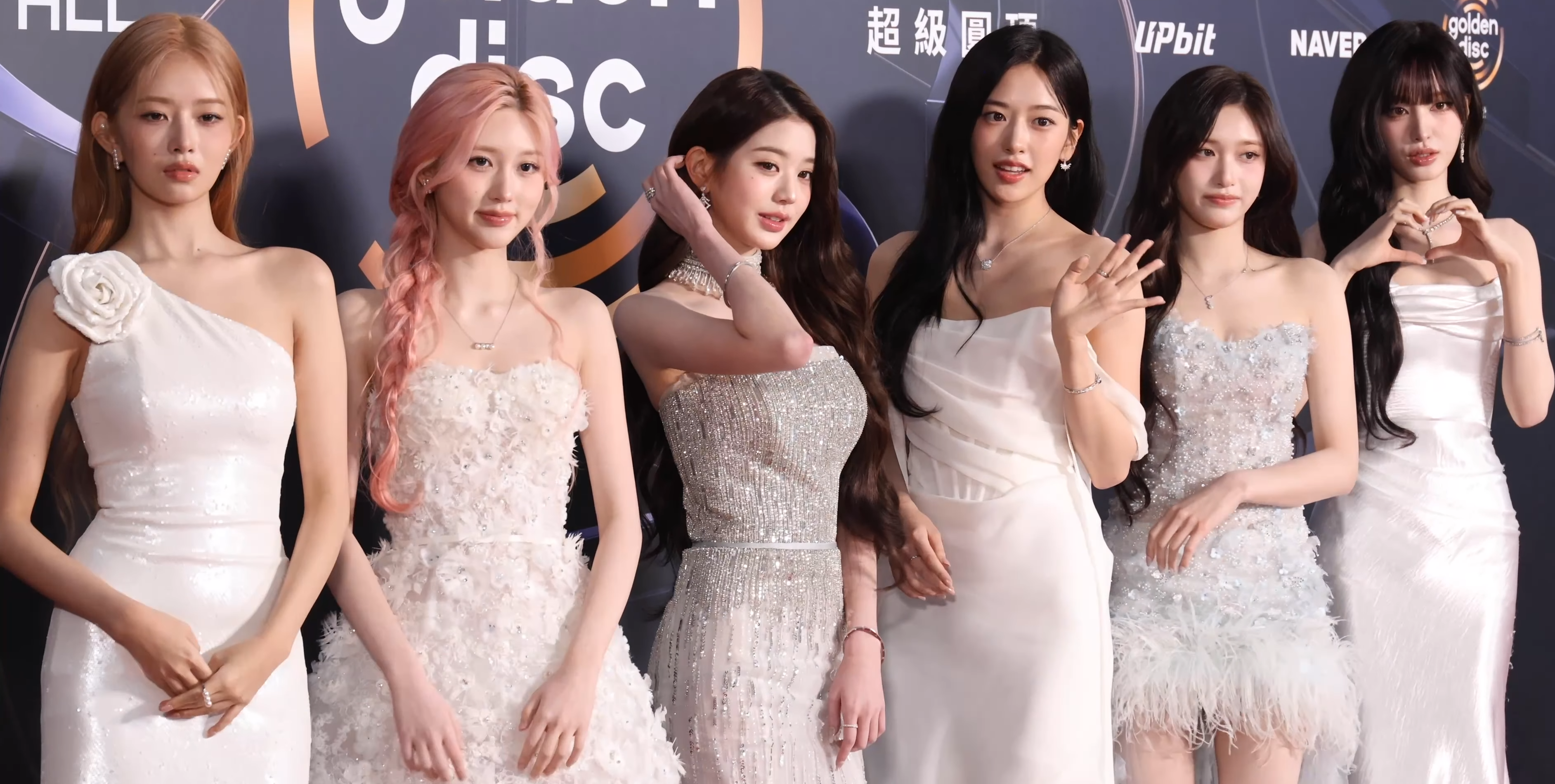
- Ive in January 2026; L–R: Rei, Gaeul, Jang Won-young, An Yu-jin, Leeseo, and Liz

Background information
- Origin: Seoul, South Korea
- Genres: K-pop; pop; bubblegum pop; electronic; EDM
- Years active: 2021–present
- Labels: Starship; Columbia
- Members: Gaeul; An Yu-jin; Rei; Jang Won-young; Liz; Leeseo
- Website: ive-official.com

Ive (Korean: 아이브; RR: Aibeu; stylized in all caps) is a South Korean girl group formed by Starship Entertainment. The group is composed of six members: Gaeul, An Yu-jin, Rei, Jang Won-young, Liz, and Leeseo. Ive is known for their viral songs and for achieving one of the most successful debuts in recent K-pop, having received several rookie awards and featuring on Forbes Korea Power Celebrity 40.

Ive made their debut on December 1, 2021, with the single album Eleven. It was followed shortly with the single album Love Dive (2022), whose lead single became their first number-one song on South Korea's Circle Digital Chart. It was the best-performing single of the year and was awarded Song of the Year at multiple year-end award shows, including the Golden Disc Awards, MAMA Awards, and Melon Music Awards. Ive achieved their second number-one song with the lead single of their third single album, After Like (2022).

In 2023, the group released their first studio album, I've Ive, to commercial success. The album won the Melon Music Award for Album of the Year and produced the chart-topping singles "Kitsch" and "I Am". Later that year, they released their first extended play, I've Mine, which spawned their fifth number-one single "Baddie". They followed with the extended play Ive Switch (2024) and performed at Lollapalooza. In 2025, Ive released the extended plays Ive Empathy, featuring their sixth number-one single "Rebel Heart", and Ive Secret. Their second studio album Revive+ (2026) yielded the lead single "Bang Bang", which won the Melon Music Award for Song of the Year and was nominated for the Grammy Award for Best Asian Pop Music Performance.

== Name ==
Ive's official logo

The group's name is meant to evoke the English phrase "I have". It refers to the idea of showing what "I have" to the audience with confidence, where instead of telling the story of growth, the group intends to portray a "complete girl group" from the start.

== Career ==
=== 2017–2021: Pre-debut activities ===
Wonyoung and Yujin, representing Starship Entertainment, participated in the reality competition series Produce 48 in 2018, finishing in first place and fifth place respectively, thus becoming members of the project girl group Iz*One. They promoted with the group until its disbandment on April 29, 2021.

Gaeul joined Starship Entertainment in 2017, after being scouted at a dance competition in Incheon. Rei joined the company in 2018 after passing at the Loen Friends Global Audition in Japan. Rei's audition caught the judges' attention with her distinct voice. In May of that year, she moved to Korea and began training. Leeseo was an SM Entertainment Kids model. Liz joined the company in 2019 through an open audition.

=== 2021–2022: Debut with Eleven, and Love Dive and After Like ===
On November 2, 2021, Starship Entertainment announced that they would be debuting a new girl group, their first since WJSN in 2016. The members were revealed from November 3 to 8 (in order: Yujin, Gaeul, Wonyoung, Liz, Rei, and Leeseo). On November 8, Starship confirmed that the group would debut on December 1, followed two days later by the announcement of the title of the group's first single album as Eleven. On December 1, the group released their debut single album, Eleven, led by the single of the same name. The group made their broadcast debut on KBS2's Music Bank on December 3, performing "Eleven".

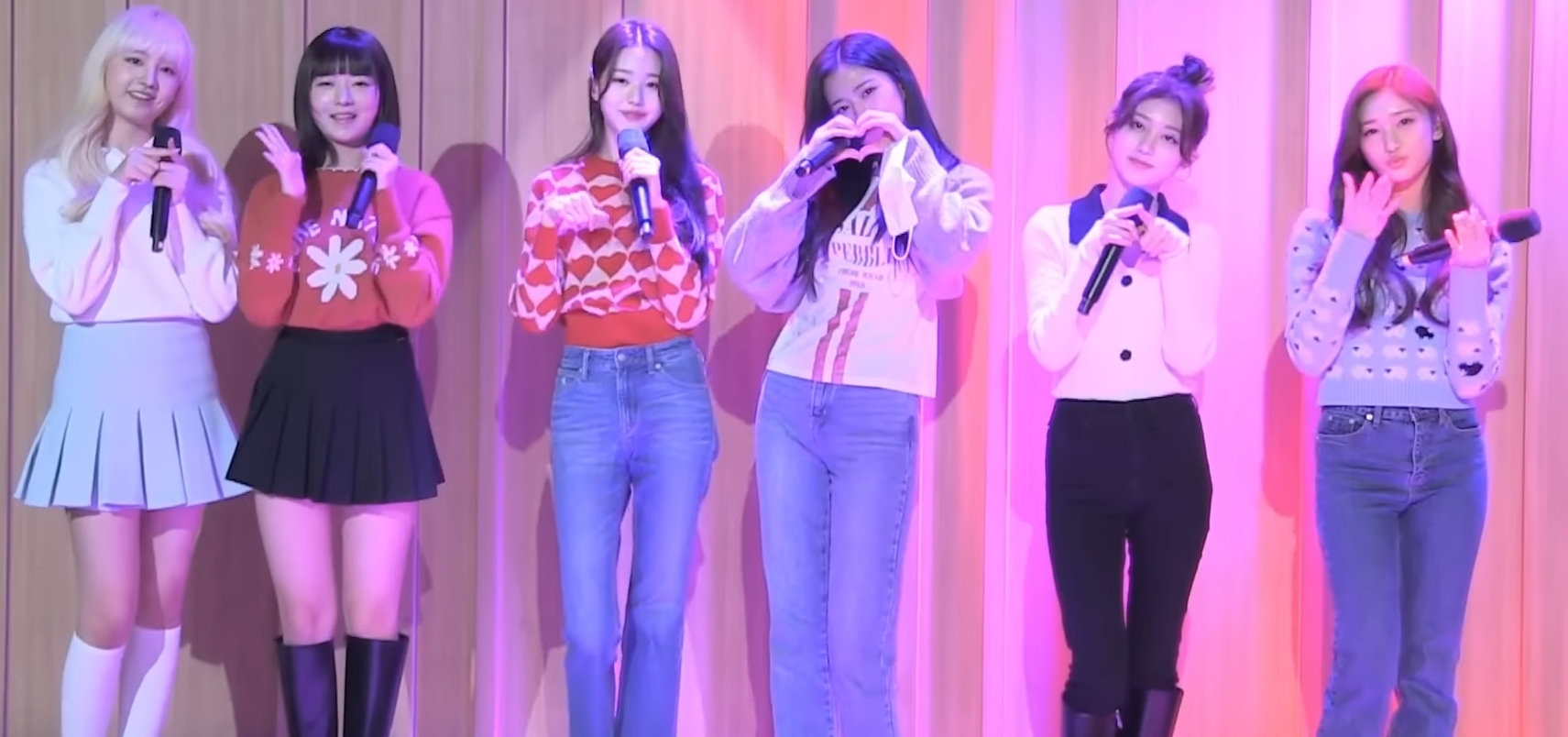
Ive at SBS Radio in December 2021

"Eleven" was a commercial success; charting at number nine on Billboard's World Digital Song Sales chart and at number two on the Circle Digital Chart. On December 8, exactly one week after their debut, Ive earned their first music show win on MBC M's Show Champion, making them the fastest girl group to win first place since debut. "Eleven" went on to win on music shows 13 times, including a triple crown on KBS2's Music Bank, MBC's Music Core, and SBS' Inkigayo. In addition, Eleven recorded the most album sales in its first week of release for girl group debut albums. In January of the following year, Ive performed a sending-off stage in Olympic Hall for the national athletes of the South Korean delegation to the 2022 Winter Olympics. Later on, Insider named Ive's "Eleven" as one of the best debut songs of all time in K-pop.

On April 5, 2022, Ive released their second single album, Love Dive, led by the single of the same name. "Love Dive" charted at number one on the Circle Digital Chart, becoming their first number-one song in South Korea. The song peaked at 10 on Billboard's Global Excl. US chart, becoming the group's first song to reach the top 10, and went on to chart for 29 consecutive weeks. "Love Dive" ranked number one on both Melon and Circle year charts for 2022. It was awarded Song of the Year on various award shows, including on the MAMA Awards, Melon Music Awards, Golden Disc Awards, and Asia Artist Awards. The group was also awarded Best Female Group and Best New Artist on Melon Music Awards, Rookie Artist of the Year on Golden Disc Awards, they also won various year-end music awards on Genie Music Awards, Circle Chart Music Awards, and Seoul Music Awards.

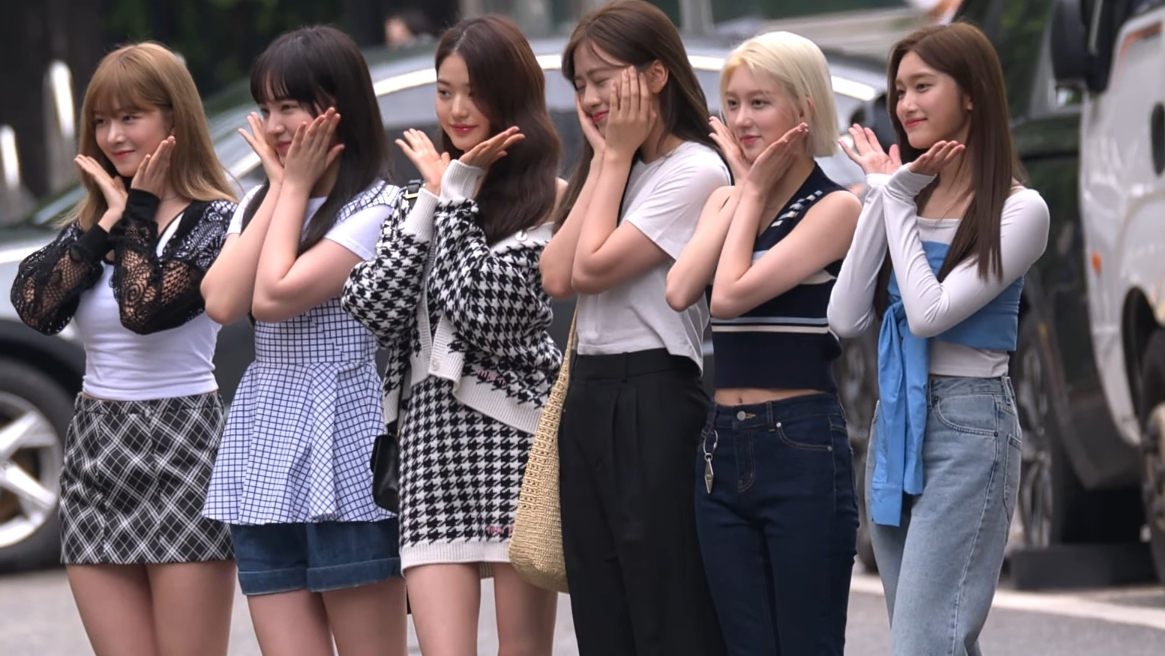
Ive in June 2022

On May 14 and 15, Ive performed at Kpop Flex in Frankfurt, Germany held at the Deutsche Bank Park, the group's first overseas performance. A month later, Ive performed at the Jamsil Stadium in Seoul as part of the line-up for 28th Dream Concert.

On July 18, Starship Entertainment announced that Ive would release their third single album, After Like, in August. It was released alongside the lead single of the same name on August 22. "After Like" samples "I Will Survive" by Gloria Gaynor. "After Like" charted at number one on the Circle Digital Chart, earning the group their second number-one song in South Korea and became the group's first song to achieve a perfect all-kill (PAK), a music chart achievement where a song simultaneously charts number one on the real-time, daily, and weekly charts of South Korea's various music streaming platforms. "After Like" went on to win on music shows 14 times, becoming the song with the most music show wins that year. The album later sold over 1,700,000 album copies.

On October 19, Ive released the Japanese version of "Eleven", with the music video having been pre-released a month earlier. It was released with B-side "Queen of Hearts," their first Japanese-language original song. The single sold 88,312 copies in its first week on Billboard Japan, and was certified gold by the Recording Industry Association of Japan. On October 15, Ive performed during Day 2 of KCON Japan at the Ariake Arena in Tokyo, Japan.

On November 16, Ive released the "After Like" Holiday Remix, for Spotify's annual "Spotify Holiday Single" project. In November 26, Ive won their first daesang (grand prize) award for Song of the Year at the 2022 Melon Music Awards. Later on, they won three more daesang on various award shows. On December 20, 2022, it was announced that Ive would appear on the cover of the January 2023 issue of Vogue Korea.

=== 2023: First studio album I've Ive and first solo tour The Prom Queens ===
On January 16, 2023, Ive released their second Japanese single "Love Dive", a re-recording of their Korean single of the same name. From February 11 to 24, 2023, Ive embarked on the first leg of their first solo tour, The Prom Queens, which visited Seoul, Yokohama, and Kobe in six sold-out dates.

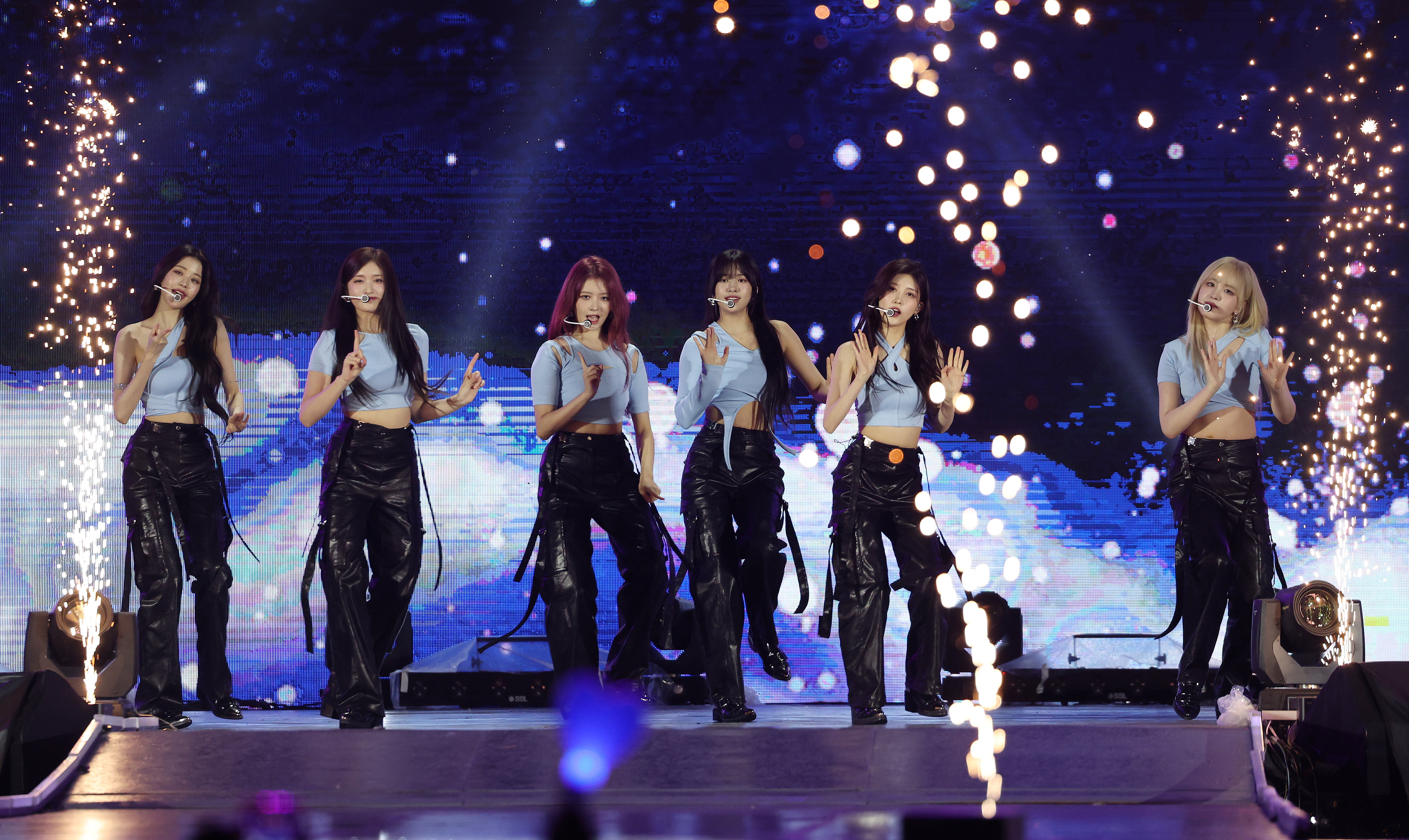
Ive performing "I Am" at the 2023 World Scout Jamboree K-pop Super Live Concert

On March 16, Starship Entertainment announced that Ive would be releasing their first studio album, I've Ive, on April 10, with seven of the eleven songs on the album featuring songwriting credits by the members. The group pre-released a single from the album, titled "Kitsch", on March 27, which debuted at number one on the Circle Digital Chart. The song became their second song to achieve a perfect all-kill on Korean music charts.

On March 24, it was announced that the group had signed with Columbia Records for promotion in United States as part of Kakao Entertainment, the parent company of Starship Entertainment, partnership with the label.

I've Ive was released on April 10, alongside the single "I Am". "I Am" ascended to number one on the Circle Digital Chart, and became their third song to achieve a perfect all-kill on Korean music charts making I've Ive the first K-pop group album to have two songs with perfect all-kill since 2NE1 in 2011.

On April 11, Starship Entertainment announced that member Rei would temporarily suspend activities for health reasons. On May 9, Ive pre-released "Wave", the lead single of their upcoming Japanese album of the same name. On May 26, Starship Entertainment announced that Rei would return from hiatus after a month of inactivity. On May 31, Ive's first Japanese EP Wave debuted at number one on Oricon's daily album chart, and then debuted at number one on Oricon's weekly album charts. It also debuted at number one on the Billboard Japan Hot Albums and was certified gold by the Recording Industry Association of Japan.

From June 17 to July 9, Ive completed the second half of their first solo tour, The Prom Queens, which consisted of six stops across Southeast Asia and Taiwan. The Asia tour attracted a total attendance of 97,000 spectators. On July 13, Ive released their promotional single, titled "I Want" in collaboration with Pepsi. In July 22, Ive performed at the Metropolitano Stadium in Madrid, Spain as part of the line-up for K-pop Lux SBS Super Concert.

=== 2023–2024: Show What I Have Tour, I've Mine and Ive Switch ===
In August 2023, Starship Entertainment revealed that the group would embark on their first world tour, Show What I Have, beginning in October. On September 3, Ive announced they would be releasing their first Korean-language extended play titled I've Mine on October 13, supported by three singles: "Either Way", "Off the Record" and "Baddie". All three singles charted within the top 15 of Circle Digital Chart, with "Baddie" peaking at number 1 and becoming the group's fourth single to achieve a perfect all-kill on Korean music charts.

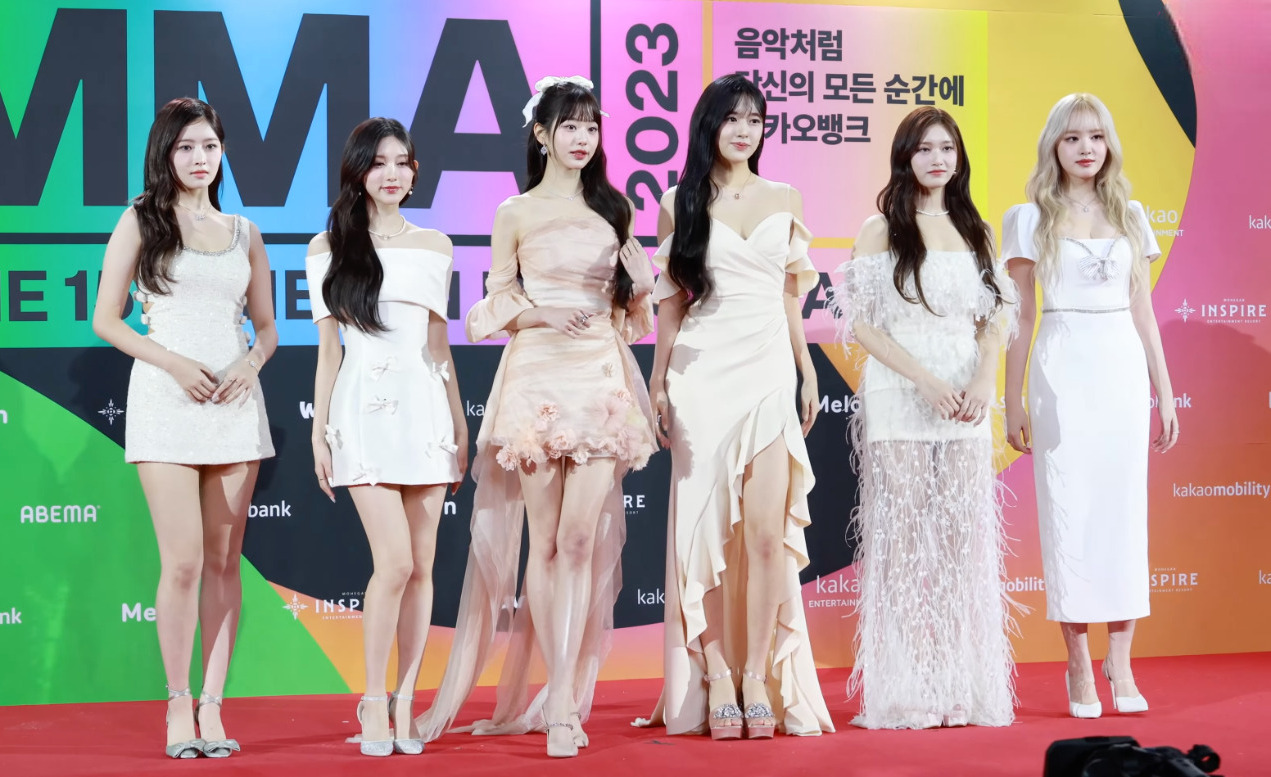
Ive at 2023 Melon Music Awards

On January 19, 2024, Ive released their first English-language digital single "All Night", featuring Saweetie. The track is a remix of "All Night" by Swedish synth-pop duo Icona Pop. The music video was shot at 222 W 6th St in San Pedro, a neighbourhood in Los Angeles. On March 29, it was announced that they would be singing the new opening theme song "Will" for Pokémon Horizons. It was released on various music distribution platforms on April 12, and the opening video was released on Pokémon's official YouTube channel.

On April 3, it was officially announced that Ive would be releasing their second extended play Ive Switch on April 29, with two singles "Heya" and "Accendio". On June 28, Ive released their second promotional single for Pepsi titled "Summer Festa". On July 15, it was announced that Ive's second Japanese extended play Alive would be released on August 28. On August 3, Ive performed live at the Lollapalooza music festival in Chicago. On November 8, the group released the single "Supernova Love" in collaboration with French DJ and record producer David Guetta.

=== 2025–present: Show What I Am Tour, Revive+, and Looks Can Kill ===
On February 3, 2025, Ive released their third extended play Ive Empathy, supported by the two singles: "Rebel Heart", which was pre-released on January 13, and "Attitude", which was released alongside the full EP. Both "Rebel Heart" and "Attitude" charted within the top 10 of Circle Digital Chart, with the former peaking at number 1 and becoming the group's fifth single to achieve a perfect all-kill on Korean music charts. The album itself also peaked at number 1 of Circle Album Chart making it their sixth album to reach number one and their fifth album to reach a million copies.

On April 21, Ive released their first Japanese-language soundtrack "Dare Me" as the opening song for the Nippon TV drama Damemane! - We'll Manage a Useless Talent. On July 12, Ive became the first K-pop girl group to perform live at the Berlin edition of the Lollapalooza music festival. The group went on to set another milestone by performing at the Paris edition of the festival on July 20, becoming the first K-pop girl group to perform at Lollapalooza in two consecutive years across three different cities. They released their third Japanese extended play Be Alright on July 30, supported by the lead single of the same name.

On August 25, Ive released their fourth extended play Ive Secret, with the lead single "XOXZ". Upon release, the album peaked at number 1 of Circle Album Chart, making it the group's seventh album to reach number one and their sixth million-seller. On September 15, Starship Entertainment announced that Ive would be embarking on their second world tour, Show What I Am, kicking off in Seoul from October 31 to November 2 at the KSPO Dome.

On January 16, 2026, it was announced that Ive would be releasing their second studio album in February. On January 25, it was confirmed that Ive's second studio album titled Revive+ alongside its lead single "Blackhole" would be released on February 23, with "Bang Bang" pre-released on February 9. On February 24, "Bang Bang" became the group's sixth single to achieve a perfect all-kill. On May 27, Ive's fourth Japanese extended play Lucid Dream was released, with the lead single of the same name. On September 27, Starship Entertainment announced that Ive's fifth extended play Looks Can Kill would be released on October 26, with the lead single of the same name pre-released on October 19. On October 30, a remix of "Looks Can Kill" by Alawn was released, featuring rapper Tiger JK.

== Other ventures ==
=== Ambassadorship ===
In September 2022, Ive was appointed as ambassador for the Korean Red Cross' annual "Everyone Campaign" to promote volunteering.

=== Endorsements ===
In August 2022, Ive appeared as a model for SK Telecom's "V Coloring", a subscription-based video ringback tone service. In January 2023, Ive was selected as model for the "2023 Pepsi Project", a collaboration between Starship Entertainment and Pepsi. The same month, Ive was chosen as the new model for Papa John's Pizza. In April, they became a model for Kwangdong Pharmaceutical's corn silk tea. In June, Ive became the ambassadors of Puma in the Asia and Pacific. On July 13, the group released the promotional single "I Want" in collaboration with Pepsi.

=== Philanthropy ===
On February 14, 2023, Ive and Starship Entertainment donated 150 million KRW to the Hope Bridge National Disaster Relief Association for emergency relief efforts after the earthquakes in Turkey and Syria.

In March 2025, Ive donated 200 million KRW to the Hope Bridge National Disaster Relief Association for wildfire relief efforts, including helping with wildfire damages and improve the treatment and awareness of firefighters working at disaster sites.

In October 2026, according to the Korea Disaster Relief Association, IVE participated in a voice donation project for Fire Hero Membership, an official welfare platform operated by the Korea National Fire Agency. The group is scheduled to provide audio content ranging from greetings wishing firefighters safety to messages celebrating special occasions.

== Artistry and image ==
=== Musical style and lyrical themes ===
Ive's music is characterized by a blend of textured electronic instrumentation, catchy melodies, and dynamic beats. Since their debut in late 2021, the group has demonstrated versatility in exploring various genres, including dance-pop, nu-disco, and R&B. Their songs often feature layered synths, house flourishes, and sophisticated production techniques. Their lyrics often explore introspective themes of identity, self-perception, and self-love. Through tracks like "Either Way" and "My Satisfaction," they confront the complexities of personal growth and empowerment. Additionally, they touch upon relatable themes of insecurity and self-discovery.

=== Style and concept ===
In terms of style, Ive exudes a chic and sophisticated aura, reminiscent of characters from teen dramas like Cher Horowitz and Blair Waldorf. This "chaebol-crush" image, referencing their "untouchable charm" and elegance, has become synonymous with the group's identity. The group consists of six members which each member brings a "unique vocal style" and personality to the group, contributing to their dynamic sound. Their collective presence symbolizes confidence and self-assurance, reflected in their name, which is a contraction of "I have".

== Impact ==
In January 2022, Ive was selected as the most anticipated K-pop artist of the year by 31 of the most popular music agency experts from different entertainment companies. In November 2022, as part of its 18th year of publication, JoyNews24 conducted a survey on 200 entertainment industry officials to determine the "Artist of the Year," for which Ive ranked first on the list. In the same month, Shibuya109 Lab, which is a youth marketing institute run by Shibuya109 Entertainment in Japan, conducted a survey with a report titled "Next Generation K-Pop Idols" for women age 15 to 24 years old. Ive took first place in the list, mentioning the attention for their song, fashion, and pose.

In December 2022, Ive was selected as "Best Singer of the Year" and placed second for "Rookie of the Year" by executives of 33 pop music officials from various entertainment companies. In the same month, Zsouken Research Institute conducted a survey for the second half of 2022 on who are the most popular artists in Japan for Generation Z, in which Ive ranked at number five, the highest act outside Japan, garnering 12.3% of votes among 120,000 participants. Ive was also listed on Forbes Korea Power Celebrity 40 in 2023.

== Awards and achievements ==
Since the group's debut, they have won various awards, including ten MAMA Awards, eighteen Melon Music Awards, eleven Golden Disc Awards, seven Asia Artist Awards, six Circle Chart Music Awards, four Seoul Music Awards, and MTV Video Music Awards Japan. Ive has won Rookie of the Year, Best Female Group, and Song of the Year at various award shows.

== Members ==
- Gaeul (가을) – dancer, rapper
- An Yu-jin (안유진) – leader, dancer, vocalist
- Rei (레이) – rapper, vocalist
- Jang Won-young (장원영) – vocalist
- Liz (리즈) – vocalist
- Leeseo (이서) – vocalist

== Discography ==
- I've Ive (2023)
- Revive+ (2026)

== Videography ==
=== Music videos ===
Title	Year	Director(s)	Ref.
"Eleven"	2021	Jinooya Makes	
"Love Dive"	2022	Haus of Team	
"After Like"	2022	Haus of Team	
"Eleven" (Japanese ver.)	2022	Highqualityfish	
"Kitsch"	2023	Haus of Team	
"I Am"	2023	Highqualityfish	
"Wave"	2023	Jimmy (Via Production)	
"I Want"	2023	Choi Young-ji (Pinklabel Visual)	
"Either Way"	2023	Yu Kwang-goeng	
"Off the Record"	2023	Lee Hye-in (2eehyeinfilm)	
"Baddie"	2023	Lafic	
"All Night" (feat. Saweetie)	2024	Charlotte Rutherford, Crystalline	
"Heya" (해야)	2024	Yoon Seung-rim, Jang Dong-ju (Rigend Film)	
"Accendio"	2024	Yu Kwang-goeng	
"Summer Festa"	2024	Choi Young-ji (Pinklabel Visual)	
"Crush"	2024	Jimmy (Via Production)	
"Supernova Love" (with David Guetta)	2024	Ivo Heffner (Saltwater Films)	
"Rebel Heart"	2025	Oui Kim	
"Attitude"	2025	Yunah Sheep	
"Be Alright"	2025	Lee Jun-yeop (Keep Us Weird)	
"XOXZ"	2025	Lee Hye-in (2eehyeinfilm)	
"Bang Bang"	2026	Bang Jae-yeob (Bangjaeyeob Film)	
"Blackhole"	2026	Yu Kwang-goeng	
"Lucid Dream"	2026	DQM	
"Bang Bang" (Minive ver.)	2026	Unknown	
"Looks Can Kill"	2026	Junghun Ha (Hattrick)	

=== Other videos ===
Title	Year	Director(s)	Ref.
"Have What We Want"	2021	Rigend Film Studio	
"Show What I Have"	2021	Haus of Team	
"Dear. Cupid"	2022	Haus of Team	
"I've Summer Film"	2022	Haus of Team	
"Empathy! "	2025	Lee Hye-in (2eehyeinfilm)	
"Rebel Heart Concept Film"	2025	Oui Kim	
"Secret, Cupid"	2025	Oui Kim	
"Secret Code: Girls' Playground"	2025	Dasom Hahn	
"Cover Girls Have Secrets"	2025	Lee Hye-in (2eehyeinfilm)	

=== Video albums ===
Title	Details
Ive The First Fan Concert "The Prom Queens"	Released: August 23, 2023; Label: Starship Entertainment; Formats: DVD, Blu-ray
Ive The 1st World Tour "Show What I Have"	Released: October 18, 2024; Label: Starship Entertainment; Formats: DVD, Blu-ray
Ive The 1st World Tour "Show What I Have" – Encore	Released: May 30, 2025; Label: Starship Entertainment; Formats: Blu-ray

== Filmography ==
=== Films ===
Year	Title	Ref.
2024	The 1st World Tour in Cinema	

=== Web shows ===
Year	Title	Notes	Ref.
2021–present	Ive On	Behind the scenes of the members' activities and music promotions	
2021–2025	1,2,3 Ive	Reality show series	
2022–present	Ive Log	Vlog content of the members	
2022–present	Ive Off	Behind the scenes of the members' non-music promotion activities	
2026	Arch·Ive	Reality show series	

== Concerts and tours ==
=== Ive The 1st Fan Concert "The Prom Queens" Tour ===
Date	City	Country	Venue	Attendance	Ref.
February 11, 2023	Seoul	South Korea	Olympic Hall; Beyond Live (Note: February 12 only)	—	
February 12, 2023	Seoul	South Korea	Olympic Hall; Beyond Live	—	
February 18, 2023	Yokohama	Japan	Pia Arena MM	57,000	
February 19, 2023	Yokohama	Japan	Pia Arena MM	57,000	
February 23, 2023	Kobe	Japan	World Memorial Hall	57,000	
February 24, 2023	Kobe	Japan	World Memorial Hall	57,000	
June 17, 2023	Manila	Philippines	Smart Araneta Coliseum	—	
June 24, 2023	Taipei	Taiwan	Taipei Music Center	8,600	
June 25, 2023	Taipei	Taiwan	Taipei Music Center	8,600	
June 30, 2023	Singapore		The Star Performing Arts Centre	—	
July 8, 2023	Bangkok	Thailand	Thunder Dome	—	
July 9, 2023	Bangkok	Thailand	Thunder Dome	—	
Total				97,000	

=== Ive The 3rd Fan Concert <Ive Scout> ===
Date	City	Country	Venue	Attendance	Ref.
April 5, 2025	Seoul	South Korea	KSPO Dome	—	
April 6, 2025	Seoul	South Korea	KSPO Dome	—	
April 12, 2025	Tokoname	Japan	Aichi Sky Expo Hall A	100,000	
April 13, 2025	Tokoname	Japan	Aichi Sky Expo Hall A	100,000	
April 21, 2025	Fukuoka	Japan	Marine Messe Fukuoka Hall A	100,000	
April 22, 2025	Fukuoka	Japan	Marine Messe Fukuoka Hall A	100,000	
April 25, 2025	Kobe	Japan	World Memorial Hall	100,000	
April 26, 2025	Kobe	Japan	World Memorial Hall	100,000	
April 29, 2025	Yokohama	Japan	K-Arena Yokohama	100,000	
April 30, 2025	Yokohama	Japan	K-Arena Yokohama	100,000	
Total				—	

=== Ive The 4th Fan Concert <Dive into Ive> ===
Date	City	Country	Venue	Attendance	Ref.
March 21, 2026	Seoul	South Korea	Inspire Arena	—	
March 22, 2026	Seoul	South Korea	Inspire Arena	—	
Total				—	

=== Other selected live performances ===
Event	Date	Venue	City	Country	Ref.
KBS Song Festival	December 17, 2021	KBS Hall	Seoul	South Korea	
SBS Gayo Daejeon	December 25, 2021	Namdong Gymnasium	Incheon	South Korea	
MBC Gayo Daejejeon	December 31, 2021	MBC Dream Center	Seoul	South Korea	
K-Pop Click Festival	January 15, 2022	Glass Hall	Seoul	South Korea	
Kpop.Flex Festival	May 14 to 15, 2022	Deutsche Bank Park	Frankfurt	Germany	
28th Dream Concert	June 18, 2022	Seoul Olympic Stadium	Seoul	South Korea	
Uni-Kon Festival	July 2, 2022	SK Olympic Handball Gymnasium	Seoul	South Korea	
K-Global Heart Dream Awards	August 25, 2022	Jamsil Students' Gymnasium	Seoul	South Korea	
Yonsei University "Akaraka" Festival	September 24, 2022	Yonsei University	Seoul	South Korea	
2022 The Fact Music Awards	October 8, 2022	Olympic Gymnastics Arena	Seoul	South Korea	
KCON Japan	October 15, 2022	Ariake Arena	Tokyo	Japan	
2022 Genie Music Awards	November 8, 2022	Namdong Gymnasium	Incheon	South Korea	
2022 Kpop & Super Model Festival	November 13, 2022	Thunder Dome	Bangkok	Thailand	
43rd Blue Dragon Film Awards	November 25, 2022	KBS Hall	Seoul	South Korea	
2022 Melon Music Awards	November 26, 2022	Gocheok Sky Dome	Seoul	South Korea	
2022 MAMA Awards	November 29, 2022	Kyocera Dome	Osaka	Japan	
2022 MAMA Awards	November 30, 2022	Kyocera Dome	Osaka	Japan	
2022 Asia Artist Awards	December 13, 2022	Nippon Gaishi Hall	Nagoya	Japan	
KBS Song Festival	December 16, 2022	Jamsil Arena	Seoul	South Korea	
SBS Gayo Daejeon	December 24, 2022	Gocheok Sky Dome	Seoul	South Korea	
MBC Gayo Daejejeon	December 31, 2022	MBC Dream Center	Seoul	South Korea	
73rd Kōhaku Uta Gassen	December 31, 2022	NHK Hall	Tokyo	Japan	
37th Golden Disc Awards	January 7, 2023	Rajamangala Stadium	Bangkok	Thailand	
Music Bank in Paris	April 8, 2023	Paris La Défense Arena	Paris	France	
K-pop Lux SBS Super Concert	July 22, 2023	Metropolitano Stadium	Madrid	Spain	
Pepsi Summer Festa	August 5, 2023	Jamsil Indoor Stadium	Seoul	South Korea	
25th World Scout Jamboree K-pop Super Live	August 11, 2023	Seoul World Cup Stadium	Seoul	South Korea	
KCON 2023 LA	August 18, 2023	Crypto.com Arena	Los Angeles	United States	
Krazy K-Pop Super Concert	August 26, 2023	UBS Arena	New York	United States	
Lollapalooza Chicago	August 3, 2024	Grant Park	Chicago	United States	
Lollapalooza Berlin	July 12, 2025	Olympiapark Berlin	Berlin	Germany	
Lollapalooza Paris	July 20, 2025	Longchamp Racecourse	Paris	France	
2025 MAMA Awards	November 28, 2025	Kai Tak Stadium	Hong Kong	China	
SBS Gayo Daejeon	December 25, 2025	Inspire Arena	Incheon	South Korea	
40th Golden Disc Awards	January 10, 2026	Taipei Dome	Taipei	Taiwan	

== See also ==
- List of best-selling girl group albums
