= List of awards and nominations received by Ive =

Ive awards and nominations
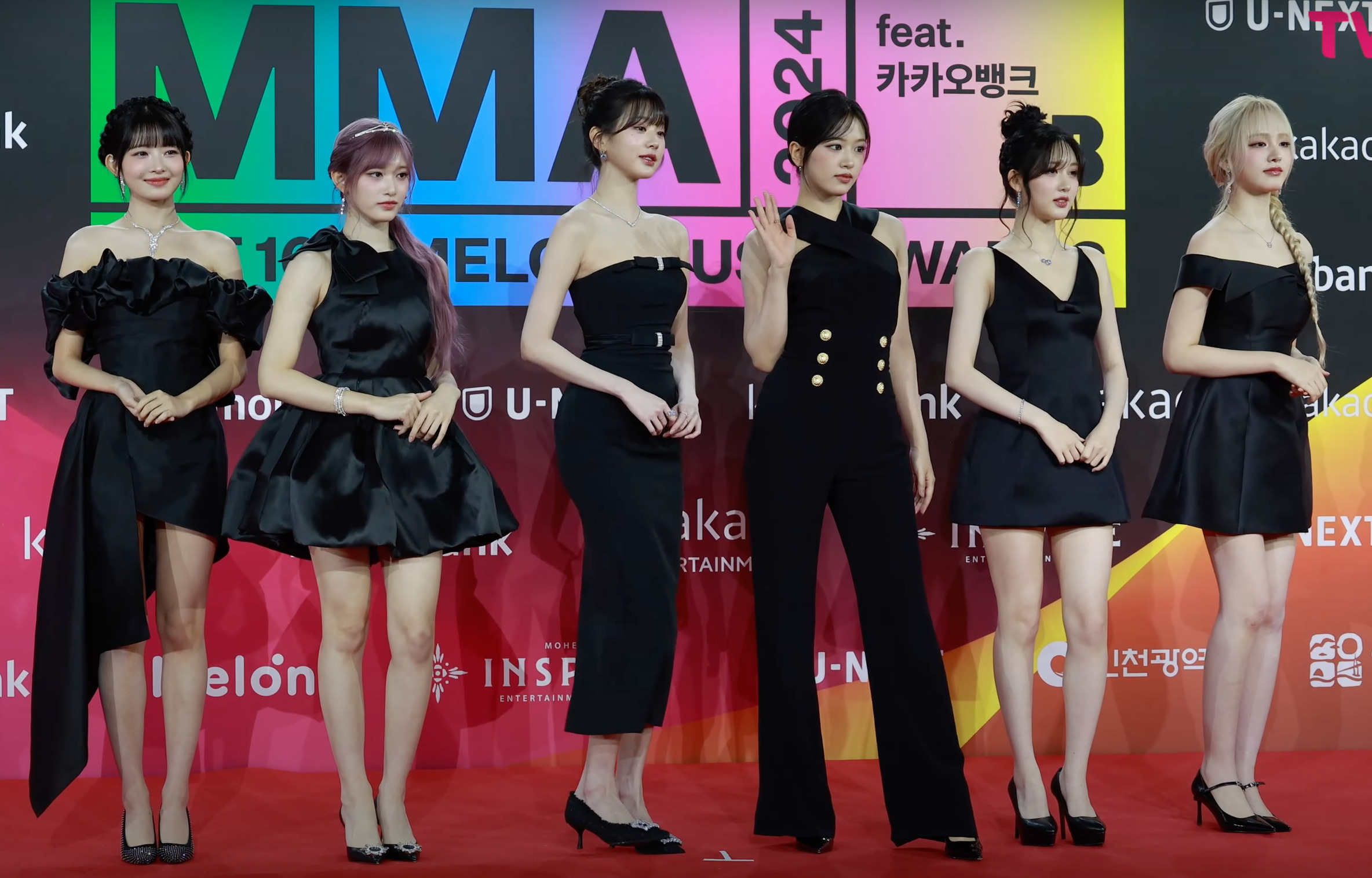
- Ive at the 2024 Melon Music Awards
Awards and nominations
Award	Wins	Nominations
Asia Artist Awards	7	11
Asian Pop Music Awards	4	9
Asia Star Entertainer Awards	2	2
Brand Customer Loyalty Awards	2	3
Brand of the Year Awards	2	2
Circle Chart Music Awards	6	11
D Awards	0	1
Dong-A.com's Pick	1	1
The Fact Music Awards	6	8
Genie Music Awards	2	6
Golden Disc Awards	11	21
Grammy Awards	0	1
Hanteo Music Awards	5	23
Japan Gold Disc Awards	2	2
Joox Thailand Music Awards	0	1
The-K Billboard Awards	2	2
K-Global Heart Dream Awards	3	3
K-World Dream Awards	5	6
Korea First Brand Awards	1	1
Korea Grand Music Awards	4	12
Korea PD Awards	1	1
Korean Broadcasting Awards	1	1
Korean Music Awards	0	4
MAMA Awards	10	33
Melon Music Awards	18	33
MTV Video Music Awards Japan	1	1
Mubeat Awards	1	1
Seoul Music Awards	4	17
Tencent Music Entertainment Awards	2	2
TMElive International Music Awards	1	1

Totals (Note: Certain award groups do not simply award one winner. They acknowledge several different recipients, have runners-up, and have third place. Since this is a specific recognition and is different from losing an award, runner-up mentions are considered wins in this award tally. For simplification and to avoid errors, each award in this list has been presumed to have had a prior nomination.)
- Wins: 104
- Nominations: 220

Ive is a South Korean girl group formed by Starship Entertainment, consisting of six members: Gaeul, An Yu-jin, Rei, Jang Won-young, Liz, and Leeseo. Since their debut, they have won various awards, including ten MAMA Awards, eighteen Melon Music Awards, eleven Golden Disc Awards, seven Asia Artist Awards, six Circle Chart Music Awards, four Seoul Music Awards, and a MTV Video Music Awards Japan.

The group debuted in 2021 with their single album, Eleven, and its lead single, which won Artist of the Year – Global Digital Music (December) at the 12th Circle Chart Music Awards. It was followed shortly in 2022 with the single albums Love Dive, whose lead single became the best-performing single of the year, and After Like. The success of their debut led Ive to win Rookie of the Year awards at the 7th Asia Artist Awards, 2022 Genie Music Awards, 37th Golden Disc Awards, 2021 Hanteo Music Awards, 2022 Melon Music Awards, and 2022 MAMA Awards. For "Love Dive", Ive won several Daesang (Note: A Daesang (Korean: 대상), which translates to "grand prize", is the highest honor given out at South Korean music award ceremonies in recognition of the artist(s) with the greatest physical and digital achievements for the year.) awards for Song of the Year at the Asia Artist Awards, Golden Disc Awards, MAMA Awards, and Melon Music Awards. They also won Best Dance Performance Female Group at the MAMA Awards and Artist of the Year – Global Digital Music (April) at the Circle Chart Music Awards for "Love Dive", as well as Best Female Group and Top 10 Artists at the Melon Music Awards.

In 2023, the group released their first studio album, I've Ive, which won the Daesang for Album of the Year at the 2023 Melon Music Awards and a Bonsang (Note: A Bonsang (Korean: 본상), which translates to "main prize", is a major award given at a South Korean award ceremony.) award at the 33rd Seoul Music Awards. The album's lead single "I Am" won Ive the Daesang for Best Song at the 31st Hanteo Music Awards and a Bonsang for Best Digital Song at the 38th Golden Disc Awards, at which they also won a Bonsang for Best Album for their first extended play I've Mine. Ive was also awarded Top 10 Artists and Million Top 10 Artists at the Melon Music Awards.

Their success continued in 2025, during which they collected several trophies across major ceremonies. At the 39th Golden Disc Awards, the group again secured wins in digital music and album categories. They received Sound of the Year (Daesang) and Artist of the Year recognition at the 2025 The Fact Music Awards, and four additional awards at the 2025 K-World Dream Awards, including K-World Best Artist (Daesang). Ive also earned the Grand Song honor at the 2025 Korea Grand Music Awards for "Rebel Heart". At the 2025 MAMA Awards, they achieved a triple crown with Global Trend Song for "Rebel Heart", Favorite Global Performer, and Favorite Female Group. The group's year was marked with major achievements at the 10th Asia Artist Awards, where they received several awards including Song of the Year (Daesang) for "Rebel Heart".

2026 marked yet another successful year for the group, further solidyfing their already impressive history of Daesang (Grand Prize) achievements. On November 15, 2026, Ive secured major historic achievements by winning Song of the Year at the 2026 Melon Music Awards for their hit single "Bang Bang". This marked their second victory in the category, following "Love Dive" in 2022, making them the first fourth-generation K-pop group to win the Melon Music Awards' Song of the Year award twice. Additionally, the group received four other awards at the ceremony, including Top 10, Global Top 10, Best Female Group and Music Video of the Year.

== Awards and nominations ==
Name of the award ceremony, year presented, award category, nominee(s) of the award, and the result of the nomination
Award ceremony	Year	Category	Nominee(s) / Work(s)	Result	Ref.
Asia Artist Awards	2022	Hot Trend Award – Music	Ive	Won	
Asia Artist Awards	2022	Rookie of the Year – Music	Ive	Won	
Asia Artist Awards	2022	Song of the Year (Daesang)	"Love Dive"	Won	
Asia Artist Awards	2022	DCM Popularity Award – Female Singer	Ive	Nominated	
Asia Artist Awards	2022	Idolplus Popularity Award – Music	Ive	Nominated	
Asia Artist Awards	2023	Best Artist Award – Music	Ive	Won	
Asia Artist Awards	2023	Popularity Award – Singer (Female)	Ive	Nominated	
Asia Artist Awards	2025	Best Artist – Singer	Ive	Won	
Asia Artist Awards	2025	Best K-pop Record	Ive	Won	
Asia Artist Awards	2025	Song of the Year (Daesang)	"Rebel Heart"	Won	
Asia Artist Awards	2026	Popularity Award – Group (Female)	Ive	Pending	
Asian Pop Music Awards	2022	Best New Artist (Overseas)	Ive	Won	
Asian Pop Music Awards	2022	People's Choice Award	Ive	10th place	
Asian Pop Music Awards	2022	Top 20 Songs of the Year (Overseas)	"Love Dive"	Won	
Asian Pop Music Awards	2023	Top 20 Songs of the Year (Overseas)	"I Am"	Won	
Asian Pop Music Awards	2023	Best Album of the Year (Overseas)	I've Ive	Nominated	
Asian Pop Music Awards	2023	Best Dance Performance (Overseas)	"I Am"	Nominated	
Asian Pop Music Awards	2023	Best Group (Overseas)	I've Ive	Nominated	
Asian Pop Music Awards	2023	Best Music Video (Overseas)	"I Am"	Nominated	
Asian Pop Music Awards	2023	Song of the Year (Overseas)	"I Am"	Nominated	
Asia Star Entertainer Awards	2025	The Platinum (Bonsang)	Ive	Won	
Asia Star Entertainer Awards	2026	The Platinum (Bonsang)	Ive	Won	
Brand Customer Loyalty Awards (Note: Co-organized by the Korean Customers Council and Brand Keys, this event recognizes the most influential brands in society and culture, as determined through consumer research.)	2022	Rookie of the Year (Female)	Ive	Nominated	
Brand Customer Loyalty Awards	2023	Most Influential Female Idol	Ive	Won	
Brand Customer Loyalty Awards	2025	Female Idol	Ive	Won	
Brand of the Year Awards (Note: It is a large-scale brand award that selects and awards the best brands that shined in the year through direct consumer voting.)	2022	Female Idol of the Year (Rising Star)	Ive	Won	
Brand of the Year Awards	2023	Female Idol of the Year	Ive	Won	
Circle Chart Music Awards	2022	Artist of the Year – Global Digital Music (April)	"Love Dive"	Won	
Circle Chart Music Awards	2022	Artist of the Year – Global Digital Music (December)	"Eleven"	Won	
Circle Chart Music Awards	2022	New Artist of the Year – Physical	After Like	Won	
Circle Chart Music Awards	2022	Artist of the Year – Global Digital Music (August)	"After Like"	Nominated	
Circle Chart Music Awards	2022	Artist of the Year – Physical Album (3rd Quarter)	After Like	Nominated	
Circle Chart Music Awards	2022	New Artist of the Year – Digital	"Eleven"	Nominated	
Circle Chart Music Awards	2023	Artist of the Year – Digital	"I Am"	Won	
Circle Chart Music Awards	2023	Artist of the Year – Global Streaming	"I Am"	Won	
Circle Chart Music Awards	2023	Artist of the Year – Streaming Unique Listeners	"I Am"	Won	
Circle Chart Music Awards	2023	Artist of the Year – Album	I've Mine	Nominated	
Circle Chart Music Awards	2023	Mubeat Global Choice Award – Female	Ive	Nominated	
D Awards	2025	Best Popularity Award – Girl Group	Ive	Nominated	
Dong-A.com's Pick	2022	Hold Your Breath and Loved Ive	Ive	Won	
The Fact Music Awards	2022	Artist of the Year (Bonsang)	Ive	Won	
The Fact Music Awards	2022	Next Leader Award	Ive	Won	
The Fact Music Awards	2022	Fan N Star Choice Award (Artist)	Ive	Nominated	
The Fact Music Awards	2022	Four Star Awards	Ive	Nominated	
The Fact Music Awards	2023	Artist of the Year (Bonsang)	Ive	Won	
The Fact Music Awards	2023	World Best Performer	Ive	Won	
The Fact Music Awards	2025	Artist of the Year (Bonsang)	Ive	Won	
The Fact Music Awards	2025	Sound of the Year (Daesang)	Ive	Won	
Genie Music Awards	2022	Best Female Rookie Award	Ive	Won	
Genie Music Awards	2022	Best Style Award	Ive	Won	
Genie Music Awards	2022	Artist of the Year	Ive	Nominated	
Genie Music Awards	2022	Best Female Group	Ive	Nominated	
Genie Music Awards	2022	Genie Music Popularity Award	Ive	Nominated	
Genie Music Awards	2022	Song of the Year	"Love Dive"	Nominated	
Golden Disc Awards	2023	Best Digital Song (Bonsang)	"Love Dive"	Won	
Golden Disc Awards	2023	Rookie Artist of the Year	Ive	Won	
Golden Disc Awards	2023	Song of the Year (Daesang)	"Love Dive"	Won	
Golden Disc Awards	2023	TikTok Most Popular Artist Award	Ive	Nominated	
Golden Disc Awards	2024	Best Album (Bonsang)	I've Mine	Won	
Golden Disc Awards	2024	Best Digital Song (Bonsang)	"I Am"	Won	
Golden Disc Awards	2024	Album of the Year (Daesang)	I've Mine	Nominated	
Golden Disc Awards	2024	Most Popular Artist – Female	Ive	Nominated	
Golden Disc Awards	2024	Song of the Year (Daesang)	"I Am"	Nominated	
Golden Disc Awards	2025	Best Album (Bonsang)	Ive Switch	Won	
Golden Disc Awards	2025	Best Digital Song (Bonsang)	"Heya"	Won	
Golden Disc Awards	2025	Global K-pop Artist	Ive	Won	
Golden Disc Awards	2025	Album of the Year (Daesang)	Ive Switch	Nominated	
Golden Disc Awards	2025	Most Popular Artist – Female	Ive	Nominated	
Golden Disc Awards	2025	Song of the Year (Daesang)	"Heya"	Nominated	
Golden Disc Awards	2026	Best Album (Bonsang)	Ive Empathy	Won	
Golden Disc Awards	2026	Best Digital Song (Bonsang)	"Rebel Heart"	Won	
Golden Disc Awards	2026	Cosmopolitan Artist Award	Ive	Won	
Golden Disc Awards	2026	Most Popular Artist – Female	Ive	Nominated	
Golden Disc Awards	2026	Album of the Year (Daesang)	Ive Empathy	Nominated	
Golden Disc Awards	2026	Song of the Year (Daesang)	"Rebel Heart"	Nominated	
Grammy Awards	2027	Best Asian Pop Music Performance	"Bang Bang"	Pending	
Hanteo Music Awards	2021	Rookie Award – Female Group	Ive	Won	
Hanteo Music Awards	2021	Artist Award – Female Group	Ive	Nominated	
Hanteo Music Awards	2022	Artist of the Year (Bonsang)	Ive	Won	
Hanteo Music Awards	2023	Artist of the Year (Bonsang)	Ive	Won	
Hanteo Music Awards	2023	Best Song (Daesang)	Ive	Won	
Hanteo Music Awards	2024	Artist of the Year (Bonsang)	Ive	Won	
Hanteo Music Awards	2024	Global Artist – Africa	Ive	Nominated	
Hanteo Music Awards	2024	Global Artist – Asia	Ive	Nominated	
Hanteo Music Awards	2024	Global Artist – Europe	Ive	Nominated	
Hanteo Music Awards	2024	Global Artist – North America	Ive	Nominated	
Hanteo Music Awards	2024	Global Artist – Oceania	Ive	Nominated	
Hanteo Music Awards	2024	Global Artist – South America	Ive	Nominated	
Hanteo Music Awards	2024	WhosFandom Award – Female	Ive	Nominated	
Hanteo Music Awards	2025	Artist of the Year (Bonsang)	Ive	Nominated	
Hanteo Music Awards	2025	Best Global Popular Artist	Ive	Nominated	
Hanteo Music Awards	2025	Best Popular Artist	Ive	Nominated	
Hanteo Music Awards	2025	Global Artist – Africa	Ive	Nominated	
Hanteo Music Awards	2025	Global Artist – Asia	Ive	Nominated	
Hanteo Music Awards	2025	Global Artist – Europe	Ive	Nominated	
Hanteo Music Awards	2025	Global Artist – North America	Ive	Nominated	
Hanteo Music Awards	2025	Global Artist – Oceania	Ive	Nominated	
Hanteo Music Awards	2025	Global Artist – South America	Ive	Nominated	
Hanteo Music Awards	2025	WhosFandom Award	Ive	Nominated	
Japan Gold Disc Awards	2023	Best 3 New Artists (Asia)	Ive	Won	
Japan Gold Disc Awards	2023	New Artist of the Year (Asia)	Ive	Won	
Joox Thailand Music Awards	2022	Top Social Global Artist of the Year	Ive	Nominated	
The-K Billboard Awards	2022	Global Artist Award	Ive	Won	
The-K Billboard Awards	2022	Hot Rookie Award	Ive	Won	
K-Global Heart Dream Awards	2022	K-Global Bonsang	Ive	Won	
K-Global Heart Dream Awards	2022	K-Global Super Rookie Award	Ive	Won	
K-Global Heart Dream Awards	2023	K-Global Best Music Award	Ive	Won	
K-World Dream Awards	2024	K-World Best Song Award	Ive	Won	
K-World Dream Awards	2024	Upick Popularity Award – Girl Group	Ive	Nominated	
K-World Dream Awards	2025	K-World Best Artist Award (Daesang)	Ive	Won	
K-World Dream Awards	2025	K-World Bonsang Award	Ive	Won	
K-World Dream Awards	2025	K-World Class Award	Ive	Won	
K-World Dream Awards	2026	K-World Dream Best Digital Music Award	Ive	Won	
Korea First Brand Awards (Note: The 2023 Korea First Brand Awards selected promising brands that are predicted to lead in the year 2023 based on criteria such as consumption trend analysis, extensive nationwide consumer surveys, and evaluation by experts.)	2023	Best Female Idol	Ive	Won	
Korea Grand Music Awards	2024	Best Artist	Ive	Nominated	
Korea Grand Music Awards	2024	Best Song	"Heya"	Nominated	
Korea Grand Music Awards	2024	Trend of the Year – K-pop Group	Ive	Nominated	
Korea Grand Music Awards	2025	Best Global K-pop star	Ive	Won	
Korea Grand Music Awards	2025	Best Music 10	"Ive Secret"	Won	
Korea Grand Music Awards	2025	ENA K-pop Artist	Ive	Won	
Korea Grand Music Awards	2025	Grand Song (Daesang)	"Rebel Heart"	Won	
Korea Grand Music Awards	2025	Best Artist 10	Ive	Nominated	
Korea Grand Music Awards	2025	Best Dance Performance	"XOXZ"	Nominated	
Korea Grand Music Awards	2025	Best Music Video	"XOXZ"	Nominated	
Korea Grand Music Awards	2025	Best Popularity - Music Day	Ive	Nominated	
Korea Grand Music Awards	2025	Trend of the Year – K-pop Group	Ive	Nominated	
Korea PD Awards (Note: Hosted by the Korean Producers and Directors Association (KPDA), the annual Korea PD Awards honours broadcasting producers, officials, and entertainers who have contributed to the development of broadcasting culture and the implementation of free media. Up to 2007, the ceremony was known as the Korea Broadcast Producer Award. Winners are chosen by members of the association who vote for nominees in various fields of entertainment.)	2023	Best Performance Award – Singer	Ive	Won	
Korean Broadcasting Awards (Note: The Korean Broadcasting Awards are hosted annually by the Korean Broadcasters Association. Winners are selected by a panel of 24 judges who are industry experts. Only one award for musicians is given each year.)	2023	Best Singer	Ive	Won	
Korean Music Awards	2023	Best K-pop Song	"Love Dive"	Nominated	
Korean Music Awards	2023	Rookie of the Year	Ive	Nominated	
Korean Music Awards	2023	Song of the Year (Daesang)	"Love Dive"	Nominated	
Korean Music Awards	2024	Best K-pop Song	"I Am"	Nominated	
MAMA Awards	2022	Best Dance Performance – Female Group	"Love Dive"	Won	
MAMA Awards	2022	Best New Female Artist	Ive	Won	
MAMA Awards	2022	Favorite New Artist	Ive	Won	
MAMA Awards	2022	Song of the Year (Daesang)	"Love Dive"	Won	
MAMA Awards	2022	Artist of the Year (Daesang)	Ive	Nominated	
MAMA Awards	2022	Worldwide Fans' Choice Top 10 (Bonsang)	Ive	Nominated	
MAMA Awards	2023	Album of the Year (Daesang)	I've Ive	Nominated	
MAMA Awards	2023	Artist of the Year (Daesang)	Ive	Nominated	
MAMA Awards	2023	Best Dance Performance – Female Group	"I Am"	Nominated	
MAMA Awards	2023	Best Female Group	Ive	Nominated	
MAMA Awards	2023	Best Music Video	"I Am"	Nominated	
MAMA Awards	2023	Song of the Year (Daesang)	"I Am"	Nominated	
MAMA Awards	2023	Worldwide Fans' Choice Top 10 (Bonsang)	Ive	Nominated	
MAMA Awards	2024	CJ Global Performance	Ive	Won	
MAMA Awards	2024	Favorite Global Performer – Female	Ive	Won	
MAMA Awards	2024	Worldwide Fans' Choice Top 10 – Female (Bonsang)	Ive	Won	
MAMA Awards	2024	Album of the Year (Daesang)	I've Mine	Nominated	
MAMA Awards	2024	Artist of the Year (Daesang)	Ive	Nominated	
MAMA Awards	2024	Best Dance Performance – Female Group	"Baddie"	Nominated	
MAMA Awards	2024	Best Female Group	Ive	Nominated	
MAMA Awards	2024	Best Music Video	"Heya"	Nominated	
MAMA Awards	2024	Fans' Choice of the Year (Daesang)	Ive	Nominated	
MAMA Awards	2024	Song of the Year (Daesang)	"Baddie"	Nominated	
MAMA Awards	2025	Favorite Female Group	Ive	Won	
MAMA Awards	2025	Favorite Global Performer	Ive	Won	
MAMA Awards	2025	Global Trend Song	"Rebel Heart"	Won	
MAMA Awards	2025	Album of the Year (Daesang)	Ive Empathy	Nominated	
MAMA Awards	2025	Artist of the Year (Daesang)	Ive	Nominated	
MAMA Awards	2025	Best Dance Performance – Female Group	"Rebel Heart"	Nominated	
MAMA Awards	2025	Best Female Group	Ive	Nominated	
MAMA Awards	2025	Fans' Choice of the Year (Bonsang)	Ive	Nominated	
MAMA Awards	2025	Song of the Year (Daesang)	"Rebel Heart"	Nominated	
MAMA Awards	2025	Worldwide Fans' Choice Top 10 – Female (Bonsang)	Ive	Nominated	
Melon Music Awards	2022	Best Female Group	Ive	Won	
Melon Music Awards	2022	Best New Artist	Ive	Won	
Melon Music Awards	2022	Song of the Year (Daesang)	"Love Dive"	Won	
Melon Music Awards	2022	Top 10 Artist (Bonsang)	Ive	Won	
Melon Music Awards	2022	Artist of the Year (Daesang)	Ive	Nominated	
Melon Music Awards	2023	Album of the Year (Daesang)	I've Ive	Won	
Melon Music Awards	2023	Millions Top 10 (Bonsang)	I've Ive	Won	
Melon Music Awards	2023	Top 10 Artist (Bonsang)	Ive	Won	
Melon Music Awards	2023	Artist of the Year (Daesang)	Ive	Nominated	
Melon Music Awards	2023	Best Female Group	Ive	Nominated	
Melon Music Awards	2023	Favorite Star Award	Ive	Nominated	
Melon Music Awards	2023	Song of the Year (Daesang)	"I Am"	Nominated	
Melon Music Awards	2024	Global Artist	Ive	Won	
Melon Music Awards	2024	Millions Top 10 (Bonsang)	Ive Switch	Won	
Melon Music Awards	2024	Music Video of the Year	"Heya"	Won	
Melon Music Awards	2024	Top 10 Artist (Bonsang)	Ive	Nominated	
Melon Music Awards	2025	Best Female Group	Ive	Won	
Melon Music Awards	2025	Millions Top 10 (Bonsang)	Ive Empathy	Won	
Melon Music Awards	2025	Top 10 Artist (Bonsang)	Ive	Won	
Melon Music Awards	2025	Album of the Year (Daesang)	Ive Empathy	Nominated	
Melon Music Awards	2025	Artist of the Year (Daesang)	Ive	Nominated	
Melon Music Awards	2025	Berriz Global Fans' Choice	Ive	Nominated	
Melon Music Awards	2025	Japan Favorite Artist by U-Next	Ive	Nominated	
Melon Music Awards	2025	Song of the Year (Daesang)	"Rebel Heart"	Nominated	
Melon Music Awards	2026	Best Music Video	"Bang Bang"	Won	
Melon Music Awards	2026	Best Female Group	Ive	Won	
Melon Music Awards	2026	Global Top 10 (Bonsang)	Ive	Won	
Melon Music Awards	2026	Song of the Year (Daesang)	"Bang Bang"	Won	
Melon Music Awards	2026	Top 10 Artist (Bonsang)	Ive	Won	
Melon Music Awards	2026	Kakao Bank Everyone's Star	Ive	Nominated	
Melon Music Awards	2026	Japan Favorite Artist by U-Next	Ive	Nominated	
Melon Music Awards	2026	Album of the Year (Daesang)	Revive+	Nominated	
Melon Music Awards	2026	Artist of the Year (Daesang)	Ive	Nominated	
MTV Video Music Awards Japan	2022	Best Buzz Award	Ive	Won	
Mubeat Awards	2021	Rookie Artist (Female)	Ive	Won	
Seoul Music Awards	2021	K-wave Popularity Award	Ive	Nominated	
Seoul Music Awards	2021	Popularity Award	Ive	Nominated	
Seoul Music Awards	2021	Rookie of the Year	Ive	Nominated	
Seoul Music Awards	2022	Best Song Award	Ive	Won	
Seoul Music Awards	2022	Bonsang Award	Ive	Won	
Seoul Music Awards	2022	Daesang Award	Ive	Nominated	
Seoul Music Awards	2022	Hallyu Special Award	Ive	Nominated	
Seoul Music Awards	2022	Popularity Award	Ive	Nominated	
Seoul Music Awards	2023	Bonsang Award	Ive	Won	
Seoul Music Awards	2023	Daesang Award	Ive	Nominated	
Seoul Music Awards	2023	Hallyu Special Award	Ive	Nominated	
Seoul Music Awards	2023	Popularity Award	Ive	Nominated	
Seoul Music Awards	2024	Main Prize (Bonsang)	Ive	Won	
Seoul Music Awards	2024	Grand Prize (Daesang)	Ive	Nominated	
Seoul Music Awards	2024	K-Wave Special Award	Ive	Nominated	
Seoul Music Awards	2024	K-pop World Choice – Group	Ive	Nominated	
Seoul Music Awards	2024	Popularity Award	Ive	Nominated	
Tencent Music Entertainment Awards	2024	K-pop EPs of the Year	Ive Switch	Won	
Tencent Music Entertainment Awards	2024	Longest K-pop Songs on the Chart	"Heya"	Won	
TMElive International Music Awards	2026	The Hottest International Group	Ive	Won	

== Other accolades ==
=== State honors ===
Name of country, year given, and name of honor
Country	Year	Honor	Ref.
South Korea (Note: Honors are given at the Korean Popular Culture and Arts Awards, arranged by the Korea Creative Content Agency and hosted by the Ministry of Culture, Sports and Tourism. They are awarded to those who have contributed to the arts and South Korea's pop culture.)	2023	Minister of Culture, Sports and Tourism Commendation	

=== Listicles ===
Name of publisher, year listed, name of listicle, and placement
Publisher	Year	Listicle	Placement	Ref.
Forbes	2023	Korea Power Celebrity 40	38th	
Forbes	2024	Korea Power Celebrity 40	10th	
Forbes	2025	Korea Power Celebrity 40	21st	
Forbes	2024	30 Under 30 – Asia (Entertainment & Sports)	Placed	
Forbes Korea	2025	K-Idol of the Year 30	8th	

== See also ==
- List of awards and nominations received by An Yu-jin
- List of awards and nominations received by Rei
- List of awards and nominations received by Jang Won-young
- List of awards and nominations received by Liz
