= 2025 Korea Grand Music Awards =

2025 award ceremony

- Sponsored by: iM Bank
- Date: November 14–15, 2025
- Location: Inspire Arena, Incheon, South Korea
- Country: South Korea
- Hosted by: Nam Ji-hyun; Irene (Nov 14); Natty (Nov 15)
- Organised by: Ilgan Sports

Highlights
- Most wins: Stray Kids (5)
- Website: kgma-is.com

Television/radio coverage
- Network: Broadcast: ENA; Streaming: TikTok; Hulu Japan

The 2025 Korea Grand Music Awards (Korean: 2025 코리아 그랜드 뮤직 어워즈; RR: 2025 Koria geuraendeu myujik owojeu) is an awards ceremony held on November 14–15, 2025, at the Inspire Arena in Incheon, South Korea. It honours the best in South Korean music released between October 2024 and September 2025. The event was hosted by Nam Ji-hyun, Irene, and Natty. The ceremony was broadcast domestically by ENA and live streamed in Japan via Hulu and internationally via TikTok.

== Criteria ==
The criteria for the awards were announced on the official website of the awards show.

Criteria for 2024 MAMA Awards nominations
Category	Jury Score	Record sales (Streaming/Album Sales)	IS Media Points	Online voting
Grand Prize (Note: Consists of Grand Artist, Grand Performer, Grand Record, and Grand Song)	40%	60%		—N/a
Grand Honor's Choice	100%	—N/a		
Main Categories (Note: Consists of Best Artist 10, Best Music 10, Best Dance Performance, Best Adult Contemporary, Best Virtual Artist, Best OST, Best Hip-Hop, and Best Music Video)	65%			35%
Best Selling Album & Most Streamed Music	—N/a	100%	—N/a	
Best Producer	100%	—N/a		
Popularity Awards (Note: Consists of Best Listener's Pick, Fan Favorite Artist, Trend of the Year, 2025 BIGC Global Star Award, and iMbank Smart Supporter Award)	—N/a			100%
Special Awards (Note: Consists of Best Band, Best Stage, Best Memory Song, Best Trot Performance, Best Trot Stage, IS Rising Star, and K-pop Global Artist)	—N/a		100%	—N/a
Data Sources: Hanteo, Genie Music, Bugs!, and Flo (Streaming/Album Sales); Fancast (Voting Data)

== Performers ==
The lineup was revealed gradually from September to October, with the final announcement made on October 10.

=== Artist Day (November 14) ===
Performances for Day 1
Artist(s)	Song(s) Performed
Irene	"Strawberry Silhouette"
SMTR25	"Wolf"
KiiiKiii	"I Do Me"
INI	"Dominance"
Xikers	"Breathe" "Superpower (Peak)"
Xdinary Heroes	"ICU"
Cravity	"Swish" "Lemonade Fever"
Meovv	"Body" "Burning Up" "Hands Up"
Park Seo-jin	"Very Good Tip"
Fifty Fifty	"Pookie" "Eeny Meeny Miny Moe"
Lee Chan-won	"I Told You" "Maybe Today"
Woodz	"Drowning" "I'll Never Love Again"
AllDay Project	"Famous" "Wicked"
BoyNextDoor	"If I Say, I Love You" "I Feel Good" "Hollywood Action"
The Boyz	"Stylish" "You and I"
Ateez	Intro: "Hala Hala" (Hongjoong and Wooyoung) / "Wonderland" (Seonghwa and Jongho) / "The Real" (Yunho and Mingi) / "Bouncy (K-Hot Chilli Peppers)" (Yeosang and San) / "Phantom" (San solo) "In Your Fantasy"

=== Music Day (November 15) ===
Performances for Day 2
Artist(s)	Song(s) Performed
Natty	"10 Minutes"
Idid	"Chan-Ran"
Close Your Eyes	"X" "SOB"(with Imanbek)
Unis	"Swicy"
KickFlip	"Band-Aid" "My First Love Song"
P1Harmony	"Duh!"
AHOF	"We Ready" "Pinocchio"
Lucy	"Where's Your Love" "Flowering"
Nexz	"I'm Him" "Beat-Boxer"
Hearts2Hearts	"Focus"
Dayoung	"Body"
Jang Min-ho	"Lonely Love" "Play the Music!"
Idid; AHOF; Close Your Eyes; KickFlip	"Happiness" "Bang Bang Bang" "Boy In Luv" "Maniac"
Kiss of Life	"K Bye" "Lucky"
Fromis 9	"Supersonic" "Like You Better"
Suho	"Light the Fire" "Who Are You"
BtoB	"Wind and Wish" "Only One for Me" "Missing You" "Love Today"
Ive	"XOXZ" "Gotcha (Baddest Eros)" "Rebel Heart"
Stray Kids	"S-Class" "In My Head" "Ceremony"

== Presenters ==
The lineup of presenters was announced on September 19. Additional presenters were announced on November 7.

=== Artist Day (November 14) ===
- Kim Yo-han
- Ahn Hyo-seop
- Choo Young-woo
- Bae Hyun-sung
- Moon Chae-won
- Gong Seung-yeon
- Kim Do-hoon
- Uhm Tae-goo
- Seo Eun-soo
- Shin Seung-ho
- Kwon Yul
- Yeonwoo
- Lee Ju-myoung
- Lee Yul-eum
- Chae Seo-an
- Ha Young
- Seo Ji-hoon
- Lee Seol
- Kim Hyeong-seok

=== Music Day (November 15) ===
- Lee Se-young
- Byeon Woo-seok
- Sooyoung
- Ong Seong-wu
- Joo Hyun-young
- Yoon Ga-i
- Kim Dan
- Kim Do-yeon
- Kim Min-seok
- Choi Yoon-ji
- Park Se-wan
- Jung Joon-won
- Lee Joo-yeon
- Kang Tae-oh
- Tony An

== Winners and nominees ==
Winners and nominees are listed in alphabetical order. Winners are listed first and emphasized in bold.

=== Grand Prize ===
Grand Artist (Daesang)	Grand Performer (Daesang)
**Ateez**	**BoyNextDoor**
Grand Record (Daesang)	Grand Song (Daesang)
**Stray Kids**	**Ive**
Grand Honor's Choice (Daesang)
**AllDay Project**; **The Boyz**; **Stray Kids**

=== Main awards ===
Best Artist 10	Best Music 10
**Ateez**; **BoyNextDoor**; **Cravity**; **Fifty Fifty**; **Jennie**; **Lee Chan-won**; **Riize**; **The Boyz**; **Xdinary Heroes**; **Xikers**; List of nominees: AHOF; AllDay Project; Aespa; Babymonster; Blackpink; Close Your Eyes; Doyoung; Enhypen; G-Dragon; Ive; IU; KiiiKiii; Kiss of Life; Le Sserafim; Lim Young-woong; Mark; Meovv; Monsta X; NCT Dream; NCT Wish; Park Seo-jin; Plave; QWER; Seventeen; Stray Kids; Tomorrow X Together; TWS; Twice; Zerobaseone	**Aespa – Dirty Work**; **Enhypen – Desire: Unleash**; **Fromis 9 – From Our 20's**; **Ive – Ive Secret**; **Kiss of Life – 224**; **Mark – The Firstfruit**; **P1Harmony – Duh!**; **Seventeen – Spill the Feels**; **Stray Kids – Karma**; **Suho – Who Are You**; List of nominees: Ateez – Golden Hour: Part.3; Babymonster – "Hot Sauce"; Baekhyun – Essence of Reverie; BoyNextDoor – 19.99; BtoB – Btoday; BTS – Permission to Dance on Stage – Live; Day6 – The Decade; Doyoung – Soar; G-Dragon – Übermensch; Haechan – Taste; Hearts2Hearts – "Style"; I-dle – We Are; Jang Min-ho – Essay Ep. 3; Jennie – Ruby; Jin – Echo; KickFlip – Kick Out, Flip Now!; Le Sserafim – Hot; Lucy – "First Love"; NCT Dream – Go Back to the Future; NCT Wish – Color; Nexz – O-RLY?; Nmixx – Fe3O4: Forward; Plave – Caligo Pt.1; Riize – Odyssey; Super Junior – Super Junior25; Tomorrow X Together – The Star Chapter: Together; Treasure – Love Pulse; Twice – This Is For; TWS – Try with Us; Wendy – Cerulean Verge; Woodz – "Drowning"; Xdinary Heroes – Beautiful Mind; Zerobaseone – Never Say Never
Best Adult Contemporary	Best Virtual Artist
**Jang Min-ho – "Tiki-taka of Love"**; **Lee Chan-won – "세월 베고 길게 누운 구름 한 조각"**; List of nominees: An Seong-hoon – "The Road is Different"; Cheon Rok-dam – "내 여인"; Jeong Dong-won – "Easy Lover"; Jin Hae-song – "Beautiful"; Kim Young-bin – "Always Been You"; Lee Myeong-hwa – "Real Deal"; Lim Young-woong – "Eternal Moment"; Park Ji-hyeon – "It Melts"; Park Seo-jin – "Very Good Tip"; Son Bin-ah – "Honey"; Son Tae-jin – "The Mask"; Song Ga-in – "The Mambo of Love"; Young Tak – "Juicy Go" (with Kim Yon-ja)	**Plave – "Dash"**; List of nominees: Apoki – "Super Duper Ride"; David Bong – "Starlight"; Hebi. – "Ever"; Hosoo – "Dr. B-Pang"; Huntrix – "Golden"; Isegye Idol – "Stargazers"; Naevis – "Done"; Saja Boys – "Soda Pop"; Skinz – "Young & Loud"; Sphaze – "Starlight"
Best Hip-Hop	Best OST
**J-Hope – "Killin' It Girl" (solo version)**; List of nominees: AllDay Project – "Wicked"; Babymonster – "Hot Sauce"; BoyNextDoor – "I Feel Good"; Dynamic Duo – "Take Care"; Epik High – "Michelin Chyper"; G-Dragon – "Home Sweet Home" (feat. Taeyang and Daesung); Haon – "Skrr" (feat. Giselle); Kiss of Life – "Igloo"; Mark – "1999"; MilliMax – "Zombie" (feat. Drip Tarko); Riize – "Bag Bad Back"; Seori – "Run" (feat. Paul Blanco); Sik-K – "LOV3" (feat. Bryan Chase and Okasian); Jeon So-mi – "Extra"; Young Posse – "Freestyle"; Yuqi – "Radio (Dum Dum)"	**D.O. – "Forever" (from Resident Playbook)**; List of nominees: An Yu-jin – "Sunny Day" (from Resident Playbook); Day6 (Even of Day) – "Maple Latte" (from Dear.M); Haewon – "Maru is a Puppy" (from Maru is a Puppy); Huntrix – "Golden" (from KPop Demon Hunters); Isaac Hong – "My Love By My Side" (from When Life Gives You Tangerines); IU – "Midnight Walk" (from When Life Gives You Tangerines); Jin – "Close to You" (from When the Stars Gossip); Lee Chang-sub – "True Love" (from Secret Relationships); Lee Know, Seungmin, and I.N – "Start!" (from Resident Playbook); Miyeon – "When We Meet Again" (from Head over Heels); Plave – "We Don't Stop" (from The Fiery Priest – Season 2); Saja Boys – "Soda Pop" (from KPop Demon Hunters); Seok Matthew and Park Gun-wook – "Backpacker" (from Study Group); Tomorrow X Together – "When the Day Comes" (from Resident Playbook); Twice – "Takedown" (from KPop Demon Hunters); TWS – "Brand New Day" (from Good Boy); Winter – "On Such a Day" (from Resident Playbook); Young Tak – "Unknown Life" (from For Eagle Brothers); Zerobaseone – "D-Day" (from Head over Heels)
Best Music Video	Best Dance Performance
**Jin – "Don't Say You Love Me"**; List of nominees: Aespa – "Rich Man"; Baby Don't Cry – "F Girl"; Blackpink – "Jump"; BoyNextDoor – "I Feel Good"; G-Dragon – "Power"; Hebi. – "Onward"; Illit – "Do the Dance"; INI – "Dominance"; Isegye Idol – "Misty Rainbow"; IU – "Never Ending Story"; Ive – "XOXZ"; J-Hope – "Mona Lisa"; Jisoo – "Earthquake"; Katseye – "Gameboy"; KickFlip – "Freeze"; KiiiKiii – "I Do Me"; Le Sserafim – "Crazy"; Lisa – "New Woman" (feat. Rosalía); Lim Young-woong – "Heavenly After After"; Mark – "1999"; Meovv – "Meow"; Plave – "Dash"; QWER – "Dear"; Riize – "Bag Bad Back"; Seventeen – "Thunder"; Stray Kids – "Ceremony"; Twice – "This Is For"; Unis – "Curious"	**AHOF – "Rendezvous"**; List of nominees: &Team – "Go in Blind"; Aespa – "Rich Man"; Ateez – "Ice on My Teeth"; Blackpink – "Jump"; Close Your Eyes – "All My Poetry"; Enhypen – "No Doubt"; Evnne – "How Can I Do"; G-Dragon – "Too Bad" (feat. Anderson .Paak); Gfriend – "Season of Memories"; H1-Key – "Summer Was You"; I-dle – "Good Thing"; Illit – "Do the Dance"; INI – "Dominance"; Ive – "XOXZ"; Izna – "Sign"; J-Hope – "Mona Lisa"; Jin – "Running Wild"; Key – "Hunter"; KiiiKiii – "Dancing Alone"; Mark – "1999"; Meovv – "Hands Up"; Monsta X – "N the Front"; NCT Dream – "Chiller"; NCT Wish – "Color"; Nouera – "N.I.N (New is Now)"; Oneus – "X"; Rescene – "Love Attack"; Riize – "Fly Up"; Say My Name – "iLy"; Secret Number – "Don't Touch"; Seventeen – "Thunder"; STAYC – "I Want It"; Stray Kids – "Ceremony"; TripleS – "Are You Alive"; Twice – "This is For"; UAU – "Attitude"; VVUP – "Giddy Boy"; Zerobaseone – "Iconik"

=== Popularity awards ===
The categories for the popularity awards were announced in September 2025, with main voting starting the same month and running until November 8. The pre-voting process was divided into two phases, weekly and monthly from April to September 2025.The main voting from September 11 to November 8. Voting was conducted through Fancast.

Trend of the Year – K-pop Group	Trend of the Year – K-pop Solo
**NewJeans**; List of nominees: Aespa; Ateez; Blackpink; BoyNextDoor; BTS; Cravity; Day6; Enhypen; Exo; I-dle; Itzy; Ive; Kiss of Life; Le Sserafim; Monsta X; NCT 127; NCT Dream; Nmixx; P1Harmony; Plave; Red Velvet; Riize; Seventeen; Shinee; STAYC; Stray Kids; The Boyz; Tomorrow X Together; Treasure; Twice; Wayv; Xdinary Heroes; Zerobaseone	**V**; List of nominees: An Yu-jin; Anton; Baekhyun; Bamby; Bang Chan; Belle; Beomgyu; Cha Eun-woo; Chaeyoung; Changbin; Chanyeol; Chen; Chenle; D.O.; Dahyun; Danielle; Dino; DK; Dowoon; Doyoung; Eunho; Eunseok; Felix; G-Dragon; Gaeul; Giselle; Haechan; Haerin; Hamin; Han; Haneul; Hanni; Han Yu-jin; Heeseung; Hong Eun-chae; Hongjoong; Hoshi; Hueningkai; Huh Yun-jin; Hyein; Hyungwon; Hyunjin; I.M; I.N; Irene; IU; J-Hope; Jaehyun; Jaemin; Jake; Jang Won-young; Jay; Jennie; Jeno; Jeonghan; Jeongyeon; Jihyo; Jimin; Jin; Jisoo; Jisung; Johnny; Jongho; Joohoney; Joshua; Joy; Julie; Jun; Jung Kook; Jungwon; Jungwoo; Kai; Kang Daniel; Karina; Kazuha; Key; Kihyun; Kim Se-jeong; Kim Chae-won; Kim Gyu-vin; Kim Ji-woong; Kim Tae-rae; Lee Know; Lee Chae-yeon; Leeseo; Lim Young-woong; Lisa; Liz; Mark; Mina; Mingi; Mingyu; Minho; Minhyuk; Minji; Minnie; Miyeon; Momo; Natty; Nayeon; Ni-Ki; Ningning; Noah; Onew; Park Gun-wook; Rei; Renjun; Ricky; RM; Rosé; S.Coups; Sakura; San; Sana; Sehun; Seok Matthew; Seonghwa; Seulgi; Seungkwan; Seungmin; Shotaro; Shownu; Shuhua; Sohee; Soobin; Soyeon; Suga; Suho; Sungchan; Sung Han-bin; Sunghoon; Sungjin; Sunoo; Taehyun; Taemin; Taeyeon; Taeyong; The8; Tzuyu; Vernon; Wendy; Winter; Winwin; Wonbin; Wonpil; Wonwoo; Wooyoung; Woozi; Xiumin; Yejun; Yeonjun; Yeosang; Yeri; Young K; Yunho; Yuqi; Yuta; Zhang Hao
Trend of the Year – Trot	Trend of the Year – Rookie
**Lee Chan-won**; List of nominees: An Seong-hoon; Bin Ye-seon; Cheon Rok-dam; Enoch; Hong Jin-young; Jang Min-ho; Jeon Yu-jin; Jeong Dong-won; Kim Hee-jae; Kim Yong-bin; Jin Hae-song; Kim Young-bin; Lee Chan-won; Na Tae-ju; Oh Yu-jin; Lim Young-woong; Park Ji-hyeon; Park Seo-jin; Park Hyun-bin; Son Bin-ah; Son Tae-jin; Song Ga-in; Young Tak	**Carmen**; List of nominees: A-na; Ahyeon; Amaru; Asa; Athena; Carmen; Cha Woong-ki; Chanelle Moon; Chihen; Chiquita; Daisuke; Dohoon; Donghyeon; Elisia; Fan; Gehlee; Gihyeon; Hana; Hanjin; Hyeonju; Ian; Jaehee; Jihoon; Jinhyuk; Jiwoo; Jiyoon; JL; Juun; Keena; Keonho; Kim; Kotoko; Kyungmin; Leesol; Minju; Nana; Paan; Park Juwon; Pharita; Rami; Riku; Ryo; Sakuya; Seo Jeong-woo; Seonghyeon; Seowoon; Shinyu; Sion; Siyun; Stella; Steven; Suyeon; Woochan; Ye-on; Yewon; Yoona; Youngjae; Yuha; Yunha; Yushi; Zhang Shuaibo
BIGC Global Star Award	Best Listener's Pick
**Suho**; List of nominees: AHOF; AllDay Project; Ateez; BoyNextDoor; BtoB; Close Your Eyes; Cravity; Fifty Fifty; Hearts2Hearts; Idid; INI; Ive; Jang Min-ho; KiiiKiii; KickFlip; Kiss of Life; Lee Chan-won; Lucy; Meovv; NEXZ; P1Harmony; Park Seo-jin; SMTR25; Stray Kids; The Boyz; Unis; Woodz; Xdinary Heroes; Xikers	**Unis – "Swicy"**; List of nominees: Ateez – "Lemon Drop"; Beomgyu – "Panic"; J-Hope – "Killin' It Girl" (feat. GloRilla); J-Hope – "Mona Lisa"; Jeong Dong-won – "Easy Lover"; Lim Young-woong – "Eternal Moment"; Monsta X – "N the Front" (H.ONE remix); Monsta X – "Rush Hour" (Re-recorded); Park Ji-hyeon – "It Melts"; Secret Number – "Don't Touch"; Stray Kids – "Ceremony"; Stray Kids – "Ceremony" (Hip-hop version – English version); Tablo and RM – "Stop the Rain"; Tomorrow X Together – "Beautiful Strangers"; Tomorrow X Together – "When the Day Comes"; Unis – "See You in My Dream"; Young Tak – "Juicy Go" (with Kim Yon-ja)
Fan Vote Artist – Female	Fan Vote Artist – Male
**Yuqi**; List of nominees: Ahyeon; An Yu-jin; Asa; Bae; Chaeryeong; Chaeyoung; Chiquita; Dahyun; Gaeul; Giselle; Haewon; Hong Eun-chae; Huh Yun-jin; Iroha; Jang Won-young; Jennie; Jeongyeon; Jihyo; Jisoo; Jiwoo; Karina; Kazuha; Kim Chae-won; Kyujin; Leeseo; Lia; Lily; Lisa; Liz; Mina; Minju; Minnie; Moka; Momo; Nayeon; Ningning; Pharita; Rami; Rei; Rora; Rosé; Ruka; Ryujin; Sakura; Sana; Shuhua; Soyeon; Sullyoon; Tzuyu; Winter; Wonhee; Yeji; Yuna; Yunah	**Jimin**; List of nominees: Anton; Baekhyun; Bang Chan; Beomgyu; Changbin; Chenle; Dino; DK; Dowoon; Eric; Eunseok; Felix; Haechan; Han; Han Yu-jin; Heeseung; Hongjoong; Hoshi; Hueningkai; Hyunjae; Hyunjin; I.N; J-Hope; Jacob; Jaehee; Jaehyun; Jaemin; Jake; Jay; Jeno; Jeonghan; Jin; Jisung; Jongho; Joshua; Jun; Jung Kook; Jungwon; Juyeon; Kevin; Kim Gyu-vin; Kim Ji-woong; Kim Tae-rae; Lee Know; Leehan; Mark; Mingi; Mingyu; New; Ni-Ki; Park Gun-wook; Q; Renjun; Ricky; Riku; Riwoo; RM; Ryo; S.Coups; Sakuya; San; Sangyeon; Seok Matthew; Seonghwa; Seungkwan; Shotaro; Sion; Sohee; Soobin; Suga; Sungchan; Sungho; Sunghoon; Sungjin; Sunoo; Sunwoo; Taehyun; Taesan; The8; V; Vernon; Wonbin; Wonpil; Wonwoo; Wonhak; Wooyoung; Woozi; Yeonjun; Yeosang; Young K; Younghoon; Yunho; Yushi; Zhang Hao
Best Popularity – Artist Day	Best Popularity – Music Day
**Lee Chan-won**; List of nominees: AllDay Project; Ateez; BoyNextDoor; Cravity; Fifty Fifty; INI; KiiiKiii; Meovv; The Boyz; Woodz; Xdinary Heroes; Xikers; Park Seo-jin	**Stray Kids**; List of nominees: AHOF; BtoB; Close Your Eyes; Hearts2Hearts; Idid; Ive; Jang Min-ho; KickFlip; Kiss of Life; Lucy; NEXZ; P1Harmony; Suho; Unis
iMbank Smart Supporter Award
**The Boyz**

=== Special awards ===
Best Band	Best Memory
**Lucy**; **Xdinary Heroes**	**Woodz**
Best Selling Album	Best Streaming Song
**Stray Kids – Karma**	**Aespa – "Whiplash"**
Best Trot Performance	Best Trot Stage
**Park Seo-jin**	**Jang Min-ho**
Best Stage	Best Producer
**Cravity**	**Teddy Park**
IS Rookie	IS Rising Star
**AHOF**; **Close Your Eyes**; **Meovv**	**AllDay Project**; **Hearts2Hearts**; **Idid**; **KickFlip**; **KiiiKiii**
K-pop Global Artist	Style Icon
**INI**; **Nexz**	**Unis**
Best Global K-pop Star	Hulu Japanese Popularity
**Ive**	**Nexz**
ENA K-pop Artist	Best Vocal Performance
**Ive**	**BtoB**
Best Solo Artist – Female	Best Solo Artist – Male
**Dayoung**	**Suho**

== Multiple awards ==
The following artist(s) received two or more awards:

Count	Artist(s)
5	Stray Kids
4	Ive
4	Lee Chan-won
3	The Boyz
3	Suho
2	Aespa
2	AHOF
2	AllDay Project
2	Ateez
2	BoyNextDoor
2	Cravity
2	Jang Min-ho
2	Nexz
2	Unis
2	Xdinary Heroes
