= Show What I Am World Tour =

2025–26 concert tour by Ive

- World tour by Ive
- Promotional poster of the tour in Seoul, South Korea
- Location: Asia; North America; Oceania
- Associated albums: Ive Secret; Revive+
- Start date: October 31, 2025
- End date: January 31, 2027
- Legs: 3
- No. of shows: 31

Ive concert chronology
- Show What I Have World Tour (2023–24); Show What I Am Tour (2025–26)

The Show What I Am World Tour was the second worldwide concert tour and fourth tour overall by South Korean girl group Ive, held in support of their extended play Ive Secret (2025) and their second studio album Revive+ (2026). The tour began on October 31, 2025, in Seoul, South Korea, and set to conclude on January 31, 2027 in Seoul, South Korea, with 31 shows across Asia, North America and Oceania. The tour received positive reviews, with praise for the group's performances and the members' solo stages.

== Background ==
On September 18, 2025, Ive revealed that they would hold their third concert tour, titled "Show What I Am", beginning with three shows in Seoul from October 31 to November 2. On December 2, it was announced that the tour would include a stop in Japan, with concerts scheduled at Kyocera Dome Osaka on April 18 and April 19. On March 25, Ive announced new concert dates in Asia, North America, and Oceania. On April 3, a third show was added in Hong Kong due to "overwhelming demand".

The tour's North American leg began on July 21, 2026, in Toronto, Canada, and continued through cities including Montreal, Newark, Austin, Los Angeles, Oakland, and Seattle, before concluding in Vancouver on August 9. The tour then proceeded to Asia, with concerts in Hong Kong and Taipei, alongside additional stops in Kuala Lumpur, Manila, Singapore, and Macao, as well as performances in Australia and New Zealand.

== Concert synopsis ==
The concert was structured into multiple segments featuring both group and solo performances. The show began with a sequence of high-energy songs, including "Gotcha (Baddest Eros)", "XOXZ", and "Baddie", followed by mid-show transitions that shifted the tone of the performance.

The next part of the concert featured solo stages performed by each of the members, which all presented different musical styles and concepts to show individual artistic directions within the group. The section began with "8" by Jang Won-young, and continued to "In Your Heart" by Rei, "Unreal" by Liz, "Odd" by Gaeul, "Super Icy" by Leeseo, concluding with "Force" by Yujin.

Following the solo stages, the concert returned to full-group performances, with a mix of newer releases such as "Attitude" and previously released hit songs including "Love Dive", "Rebel Heart", "Kitsch", and "I Am". This led into the encore section, typically featuring three songs that varied between shows, which concluded the performance.

== Production ==
The Show What I Am Tour featured a large-scale concert production that combined dynamic stage composition, live band arrangements, and multimedia elements. Live band arrangements of the group's music were incorporated into multiple stages of the concert, adding a fuller sound and contributing to the overall scale of the production. The members interacted with the audience throughout the concert, greeting fans at the beginning and end of each show and revealing behind-the-scenes detail on the development of their solo stages.

=== Visuals and effects ===
The production utilized LED screen visuals, lighting effects, and stage transitions. The show's opening sequences featured silhouette-based visuals and large-scale screen effects, while later sections incorporated synchronized lighting. The stage layout was designed with an extended main stage setup to accommodate both full-group choreography and solo stages.

== Reception ==
The Show What I Am Tour received highly positive reviews. Numerous critics considered the concert to be an improvement over the Show What I Have Tour, praising the members' strong performances and the concert's larger focus on individual artistic expression with the solo stages. The tour was seen as a demonstration of Ive's transition to more professional performances, and that it firmly established the group as a major live performer in the K-pop industry.

Choi Song-hee of Aju News praised the strength of the group's performances and called the solo stages a highlight of the show. Yoon Hye-young of Sports Today applauded the members' fan interactions during the performances and identified the inclusion of solo stages for all members as a key strength as it allowed each member to showcase distinct musical styles. Kim Soo-young of Hankyung News praised the use of a live band for enhancing the scale and intensity of the performances, and described the group's live vocals as stable and improved since their last tour. Kim also highlighted the group's coordination, even during demanding choreography, which was notably seen in a moment at the November 2 Seoul show where member Jang Won-young quickly recovered when her headset microphone fell off. Audience participation, including singing along, was also frequently mentioned as contributing to the overall atmosphere. Similarly, Lee Woo-jeong of Chosun noted that the setlist, combining solo segments and well-known hits, showed the group's progression well and kept their fans engaged throughout the performance.

The concert's production and visual presentation were highlighted as another strong aspect. Vinny Real of Philippine Concerts pointed to large-scale LED visuals, lighting effects, and stage design elements that created a stunning atmosphere. Additionally, Yoon Gi-baek of Edaily wrote that the lighting effects were well-coordinated with the solo stages and accented each performance.

== Tour dates ==
List of 2025 concert dates
Date	City	Country	Venue	Attendance
October 31	Seoul	South Korea	KSPO Dome; Beyond Live (Note: November 2 for the Beyond Live.)	28,000
November 1	Seoul	South Korea	KSPO Dome; Beyond Live	
November 2	Seoul	South Korea	KSPO Dome; Beyond Live	

List of 2026 concert dates
Date	City	Country	Venue	Attendance
April 4	Kuala Lumpur	Malaysia	Unifi Arena (Note: Promoted as Axiata Arena)	—
April 18	Osaka	Japan	Kyocera Dome Osaka	79,000
April 19	Osaka	Japan	Kyocera Dome Osaka	79,000
April 25	Pasay (Note: Promoted as Manila)	Philippines	SM Mall of Asia Arena	—
May 9	Singapore		Singapore Indoor Stadium	—
May 23	Macao		Venetian Arena	—
May 24	Macao		Venetian Arena	—
June 13	Sydney	Australia	Qudos Bank Arena	—
June 16	Melbourne	Australia	Rod Laver Arena	—
June 20	Auckland	New Zealand	Spark Arena	8,000
June 24	Tokyo	Japan	Tokyo Dome	48,000
July 21	Toronto	Canada	Scotiabank Arena	—
July 23	Montreal	Canada	Bell Centre	—
July 25	Newark	United States	Prudential Center	—
July 29	Austin	United States	Moody Center	—
August 1	Inglewood (Note: Promoted as Los Angeles)	United States	Kia Forum	—
August 4	Oakland	United States	Oakland Arena	—
August 7	Seattle	United States	Climate Pledge Arena	—
August 9	Vancouver	Canada	Rogers Arena	—
September 4	Hong Kong		AsiaWorld–Arena	—
September 5	Hong Kong		AsiaWorld–Arena	—
September 6	Hong Kong		AsiaWorld–Arena	—
September 11	Taipei	Taiwan	Taipei Arena; Mnet Plus (Note: September 13 for the Mnet Plus.)	—
September 12	Taipei	Taiwan	Taipei Arena; Mnet Plus	—
September 13	Taipei	Taiwan	Taipei Arena; Mnet Plus	—

List of 2027 concert dates
Date	City	Country	Venue	Attendance
January 29	Seoul (Note: Labeled as Encore)	South Korea	KSPO Dome	—
January 30	Seoul	South Korea	KSPO Dome	—
January 31	Seoul	South Korea	KSPO Dome	—
