= Attitude (Ive song) =

Single by Ive

from the EP Ive Empathy
- Language: Korean; English
- Released: February 3, 2025
- Label: Starship; Kakao; Columbia
- Composers: James Lewis; Ryan S. Jhun; Suzanne Vega; Roland Spreckley; Olga Sundin; Lotte Morkved
- Lyricists: Seo Ji-eum; Nietzsche; Jang Won-young

Ive singles chronology
"Rebel Heart" (2025)	"Attitude" (2025)	"Dare Me" (2025)

Music video
- "Attitude" on YouTube

"Attitude" is a song recorded by South Korean girl group Ive for their third Korean extended play Ive Empathy. It was released as the EP's second single on February 3, 2025, by Starship Entertainment.

== Background and release ==
On December 24, 2024, Starship Entertainment announced that Ive would release their third Korean extended play, Ive Empathy, on February 3, 2025. It was also announced that "Rebel Heart" would be pre-released on January 13, 2025. On January 5, the EP's concept trailer premiered, followed by the concept film on January 9. The track listing was released on January 16, with "Attitude" announced as the second single. The song's concept film was released on January 26. On February 1, the music video teaser was released, while the song and its music video were released on February 3.

== Composition ==
"Attitude" was written by Seo Ji-eum, Nietzsche, and Jang Won-young, composed and arranged by James Lewis and Ryan S. Jhun, with Suzanne Vega, Roland Spreckley, Olga Sundin, and Lotte Morkved contributing to the composition. It was described as a "retro vibe" song that interpolates Vega's "Tom's Diner" with lyrics about "determining one's attitude in a given situation".

== Promotion ==
Ive performed the song on four music programs in the first week of promotion: Mnet's M Countdown on February 6, KBS's Music Bank on February 7, MBC's Show! Music Core on February 8, and SBS's Inkigayo on February 9. In the second week of promotion, they performed on music programs: M Countdown on February 13,

== Accolades ==
Music program awards for "Attitude"
Program	Date	Ref.
M Countdown	February 13, 2025	
Inkigayo	February 16, 2025	
Inkigayo	February 23, 2025	
Show! Music Core	March 1, 2025	

== Charts ==
=== Weekly charts ===
Weekly chart performance for "Attitude"
Chart (2025)	Peak position
Global 200 (Billboard)	143
Hong Kong (Billboard)	15
Japan (Japan Hot 100)	48
Japan Combined Singles (Oricon)	46
Singapore Regional (RIAS)	14
South Korea (Circle)	7
Taiwan (Billboard)	13

=== Monthly charts ===
Monthly chart performance for "Attitude"
Chart (2025)	Position
South Korea (Circle)	9

=== Year-end charts ===
Year-end chart performance for "Attitude"
Chart (2025)	Position
South Korea (Circle)	31

== Release history ==
Release history for "Attitude"
Region	Date	Format	Label
Various	February 3, 2025	Digital download; streaming	Starship; Kakao; Columbia

== See also ==
- List of Inkigayo Chart winners (2025)
- List of M Countdown Chart winners (2025)
- List of Show! Music Core Chart winners (2025)
