= Blackhole (song) =

Single by Ive

from the album Revive+
- Language: Korean; English
- Released: February 23, 2026
- Length: 3:14
- Label: Starship; Columbia
- Composers: Lee Chae-heon; Sophie Rose; Sarah Troy; Kristin Carpenter; MLite
- Lyricists: Seo Ji-eum; Hwang Yu-bin (XYXX)

Ive singles chronology
"Bang Bang" (2026)	"Blackhole" (2026)	"Fashion" (2026)

Music video
- "Blackhole" on YouTube

"Blackhole" is a song recorded by South Korean girl group Ive for their second studio album Revive+. It was released as the album's lead single by Starship Entertainment on February 23, 2026.

== Background and release ==
On January 16, 2026, Starship Entertainment announced that Ive would be releasing a new album in February 2026. On January 25, it was confirmed that the album titled Revive+ would be release on February 23. On February 11, the track listing was released with "Blackhole" announced as the lead single. On February 20, a spoiler video was released, followed by the music video teaser a day later. The song was released alongside its music video and the album on February 23.

== Promotion ==
Prior to the release of Revive+, on February 23, 2026, Ive held a live event aimed at introducing the album and its songs, including "Blackhole". They subsequently performed the song on four music programs: Mnet's M Countdown on February 26, KBS's Music Bank on February 27, MBC's Show! Music Core on February 28, and SBS's Inkigayo on March 1.

== Accolades ==
Music program awards for "Blackhole"
Program	Date	Ref.
Show Champion	March 4, 2026	

== Charts ==
=== Weekly charts ===
Weekly chart performance for "Blackhole"
Chart (2026)	Peak position
Global Excl. US (Billboard)	130
Japan (Japan Hot 100)	50
Singapore Regional (RIAS)	21
South Korea (Circle)	9
South Korea Hot 100 (Billboard)	19
Taiwan (Billboard)	14

=== Monthly charts ===
Monthly chart performance for "Blackhole"
Chart (2026)	Position
South Korea (Circle)	9

== Release history ==
Release history for "Blackhole"
Region	Date	Format	Label
Various	February 23, 2026	Digital download; streaming	Starship; Columbia
