= Clio Cosmetics =

South Korean cosmetics company

- Native name: ㈜클리오
- Industry: Cosmetics
- Founded: 1993
- Founder: Han Hyun-oak
- Headquarters: Seongdong, Seoul, South Korea
- Number of employees: 297
- Website: company.cliocosmetic.com

Clio Cosmetics (Korean: 클리오) is a South Korean cosmetics company based in Seongdong District, Seoul, South Korea.

== Representative Products ==
- Ink Matte Blur Tint
- Ink Matte Blur Cushion
- Peripera Ink The Airy Velvet Tint
- Peripera Ink The Airy Velvet Stick
- Ink the Tattoo Tint
- Peripera Ink the Velvet Tint
- Peripera Ink the Palette

== Brands ==
- Clio Professional is a professional make up brand since 1993 with the philosophy of "Practical Professional" providing easy-use products but excellent performance.
- Peripera is a make up brand for young girls since 2005 with fun, pop, trendy images of "Instant Beauty"
- Goodal is a Korean natural skin care brand since 2011 using fermented ingredients and infused water.
- Healing bird is a botanical hair and body care brand with silicone free ingredients and various fragrance experiences of flower garden.

== History ==
Clio Cosmetics is a Korean cosmetic company founded in 1993 starting a professional make-up brand "Clio Professional".

Over time, the company branched out into other make-up, skin care, hair and body care products. CLIO cosmetics launched Peripera in 2005, Goodal in 2011 and Healing bird in 2017.

In 2012, Clio cosmetics opened the stand-alone shop Club Clio selling all of its own brands (95 stores as of year end 2016).

In 2016, CLIO cosmetics successfully received funding of US$50 million from L-capital Asia, a private equity investment firm which is affiliated with LVMH

In July 2016, CLIO Cosmetics went public on the KOSDAQ.

== Spokespersons and models ==
Current:

- Jaehyun (2024-)
- An Yu-jin (2022-)

Past:

- Tomorrow X Together (2023)
- Aespa (2021)
- Go Min-si (2021)
- Stray Kids (2021)
- Kim Woo-seok (2020–2021)
- Krystal Jung (2018–2020)
- Gong Hyo-jin (2015–2017)
- Sandara Park (2013–2014)
- Lee Hyo-ri (2011–2012)
- Kim Ha-neul (2008)
