= Show What I Have World Tour =

2023–2024 concert tour by Ive

- World tour by Ive
- Promotional poster of the tour in Seoul, South Korea
- Location: Asia; Europe; Latin America; North America; Oceania
- Associated albums: I've Mine; Ive Switch
- Start date: October 7, 2023
- End date: September 5, 2024
- No. of shows: 37
- Attendance: 440,000

Ive concert chronology
- The Prom Queens Tour (2023); Show What I Have World Tour (2023–24); Show What I Am World Tour (2025-26)

The Show What I Have World Tour was the first worldwide concert tour and second tour overall by South Korean girl group Ive, in support of their extended plays I've Mine and Ive Switch. The tour began on October 7, 2023, in Seoul, South Korea and concluded on September 5, 2024, in Tokyo, Japan. The tour consisted of 37 concerts, including 21 in Asia, 6 in North America, 5 in Europe, 3 in Latin America and 2 in Oceania.

== Background ==
On August 11, 2023, Ive revealed that they would hold their second concert tour beginning in Seoul on October 7–8 with two shows in Yokohama the following month. On November 8, Ive announced new concert dates in Asia, US, Europe, Latin America and Australia. On November 30, a second show was added in Taipei due to "overwhelming demand". On December 9, Mecimapro announced Jakarta concert will be rescheduled from January 13 and January 14 to August 24, 2024, due to "unforeseen circumstances". On April 1, 2024, Ive announced that they would hold two shows at Tokyo Dome on September 4 to 5 for the final concert of their World Tour. On June 10, Ive announced that they would hold two encore shows at KSPO Dome on August 10–11.

== Reception ==
In the review for The Korea Times, Pyo Kyung-min wrote that "the concert hall was filled up by elementary school students and the atmosphere inside Ive's performance arena mirrored the group's moniker, "kids' president". Jeff Benjamin of Billboard described the group's concert at their sold out show in Prudential Center as a reminder that Ive has already carved out a distinct identity and color as the prom queens of K-pop and isn't so easily able to adopt other personas in the pop sphere.

Jack Wetherill of The Daily Star praised the group's concert at The O_{2} Arena saying that "I've been to countless concerts in my 31 years, but I can safely say Ive at The O2 was the best I've ever seen". He, furthermore, complimented the group's performance, writing, "It was impossible to feel sad. From the incredible, crystal-embellished stage outfits, to the clear vocals and precise choreography, there wasn't a second to be bored or underwhelmed". Gabriel Saulog of Billboard Philippines wrote that the Manila stop of the tour was more than just a concert; it was a celebration of the bond between Ive and their fans.

== Tour dates ==
List of 2023 concert dates
Date (2023)	City	Country	Venue	Attendance
October 7	Seoul	South Korea	Jamsil Indoor Stadium; Beyond Live (Note: October 8 for the Beyond Live.)	—
October 8	Seoul	South Korea	Jamsil Indoor Stadium; Beyond Live	—
November 15	Yokohama	Japan	K-Arena Yokohama	78,000 (Note: The score data is combined from the six shows held in Yokohama, Fukuoka, and Osaka.)
November 16	Yokohama	Japan	K-Arena Yokohama	78,000

List of 2024 concert dates
Date (2024)	City	Country	Venue	Attendance
January 27	Pak Kret (Note: Promoted as Bangkok)	Thailand	Impact Arena	—
January 31	Fukuoka	Japan	Marine Messe Fukuoka	
February 1	Fukuoka	Japan	Marine Messe Fukuoka	
February 7	Osaka	Japan	Osaka-jō Hall	
February 8	Osaka	Japan	Osaka-jō Hall	
February 17	Kuala Lumpur	Malaysia	Axiata Arena	7,000
February 24	Singapore		Singapore Indoor Stadium	8,500
March 2	Taoyuan (Note: Promoted as Taipei)	Taiwan	NTSU Arena	18,000
March 3	Taoyuan	Taiwan	NTSU Arena	18,000
March 13	Inglewood (Note: Promoted as Los Angeles)	United States	Kia Forum	—
March 16	Oakland	United States	Oakland Arena	—
March 20	Fort Worth	United States	Dickies Arena	—
March 24	Atlanta	United States	State Farm Arena	—
March 26	Rosemont	United States	Allstate Arena	—
March 29	Newark	United States	Prudential Center	—
June 4	Paris	France	Accor Arena	—
June 7	Barcelona	Spain	Palau Sant Jordi	—
June 10	Berlin	Germany	Uber Arena	—
June 13	Amsterdam	Netherlands	Ziggo Dome	—
June 16	London	England	The O_{2} Arena	—
June 23	Mexico City	Mexico	Palacio de los Deportes	—
June 26	São Paulo	Brazil	Espaço Unimed	—
June 30	Santiago	Chile	Movistar Arena	—
July 6	Hong Kong		AsiaWorld–Arena	—
July 7	Hong Kong		AsiaWorld–Arena	—
July 13	Pasay (Note: Promoted as Manila)	Philippines	SM Mall of Asia Arena	—
July 25	Melbourne	Australia	Rod Laver Arena	—
July 28	Sydney	Australia	Qudos Bank Arena	—
August 10	Seoul (Note: Labeled as Encore)	South Korea	KSPO Dome; Beyond Live (Note: August 11 for the Beyond Live.)	—
August 11	Seoul	South Korea	KSPO Dome; Beyond Live	—
August 24 (Note: The Jakarta concert was originally scheduled for January 13–14, 2024, but was postponed due to unforeseen circumstances.)	Tangerang (Note: Promoted as Jakarta)	Indonesia	ICE BSD Hall 5–6	—
September 4	Tokyo	Japan	Tokyo Dome	95,000
September 5	Tokyo	Japan	Tokyo Dome	95,000
Total				440,000
