= An Yu-jin =

South Korean singer and dancer (born 2003)

- An in October 2026
- Born: September 1, 2003 (age 23); Cheongju, South Korea
- Education: School of Performing Arts Seoul (dropped out)
- Occupations: Singer; dancer
- Years active: 2018–present
- Musical career
- Genres: K-pop; J-pop
- Instrument: Vocals
- Labels: Starship; Off the Record (Note: As a member of Iz*One only.); EMI; Columbia (Note: As a member of Ive only.)
- Member of: Ive
- Formerly of: Iz*One

Korean name
- Hangul: 안유진
- RR: An Yujin
- MR: An Yujin

An Yu-jin (Korean: 안유진; born September 1, 2003) is a South Korean singer and dancer. She is the leader of the girl group Ive under Starship Entertainment and a former member of South Korean-Japanese girl group Iz*One.

== Early life ==
An Yu-jin was born on September 1, 2003 in Cheongju, South Korea. Off the Record, the label under which An was signed as a member of Iz*One, revealed in 2019 that she had dropped out of school to focus on her promotions with Iz*One and that she would be home-schooled.

== Career ==
=== 2018–2021: Produce 48 and Iz*One ===
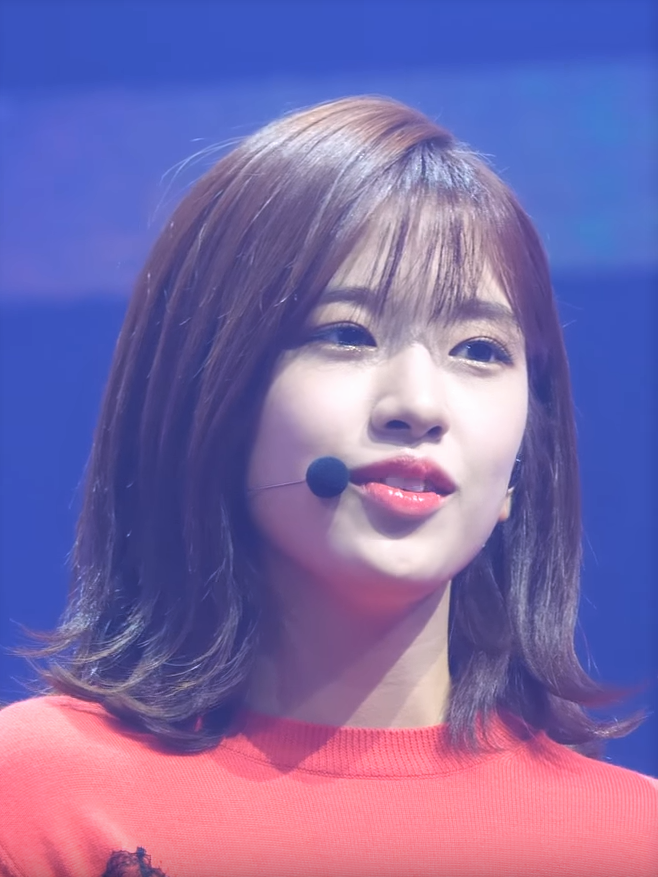
An in October 2018

From June 15 to August 31, 2018, An represented Starship Entertainment alongside Jang Won-young and Cho Ka-hyeon on reality girl group survival show Produce 48. An placed fifth and debuted with Iz*One. The group's debut extended play (EP) Color*Iz was released on October 29, 2018, with "La Vie en Rose" serving as its lead single.

Several months after her debut with Iz*One, An participated in the televised singing competition King of Mask Singer. She was the youngest competitor in the show's history, aged 15 years and 99 days.

It was announced that An would become a cast member in MBC's My Little Television V2, alongside Kim Gu-ra. However, she was removed from the cast starting from episode 34 due to the Mnet vote manipulation investigation. From March 2021 to March 2022, An hosted the music program Inkigayo alongside NCT's Sungchan and Treasure's Jihoon.

=== 2021–present: Ive and solo activities ===
After Iz*One disbanded in April 2021, she and groupmate Wonyoung returned to Starship Entertainment as trainees. On November 1, 2021, Starship Entertainment announced they would debut their new girl group Ive. It was the label's first group since the debut of Cravity in April 2020 and their first girl group since WJSN's debut in February 2016. An was later revealed as the leader and one of the vocalists of Ive. They made their official debut with the single album, Eleven on December 1, 2021.

In 2022, An served as a panelist on season two of the "military survival" reality show Steel Troops. That same year, An also led the tvN variety show Earth Arcade alongside Oh My Girl's Mimi, Lee Young-ji, and Lee Eun-ji. On June 18, An was selected to host the 28th Dream Concert. Two days later, An released the music video for their promotional single, titled "Move Like This" along with Kang Daniel and Yuna Kim, as part of the Gatorade and Starship Entertainment campaign. On December 24, An hosted the year-end SBS Gayo Daejeon festival with Key and Cha Eun-woo held at the Gocheok Sky Dome. In January 2023, it was confirmed that An would be returning for the second season of Earth Arcade.

On April 10, 2023, Ive released their first studio album, I've Ive, on which An wrote the lyrics of the track called, "Heroine". In September, An attended the Milan Fashion Week as an ambassador for fashion brand Fendi. An was chosen to host the SBS Gayo Daejeon, which will be held on December 25, 2023. This marked her second consecutive year hosting the event. On December 15, 2023, it was announced that An would be singing the Korean version of "This Wish", the main theme of Disney's Wish, which was released on December 22.

In February 2024, An was cast in the TVING variety show Crime Scene Returns. On April 8, 2024, it was announced that An had been nominated for two awards at the 60th Baeksang Arts Awards, Best Female Variety Performer and the Prizm Popularity Award (Female), of which she won the latter. In May 2024, it was announced that she would be returning for the Earth Arcade spin-off, Earth Arcade's Vroom Vroom. On June 25, 2024, it was announced that An would be hosting the SBS Gayo Daejeon for the third consecutive year.

In January 2025, it was announced that An would be returning in a new season of Crime Scene, titled Crime Scene Zero, streaming on Netflix. She was confirmed to be returning in the third season of Earth Arcade in April 2025.

== Other ventures ==
=== Endorsements ===
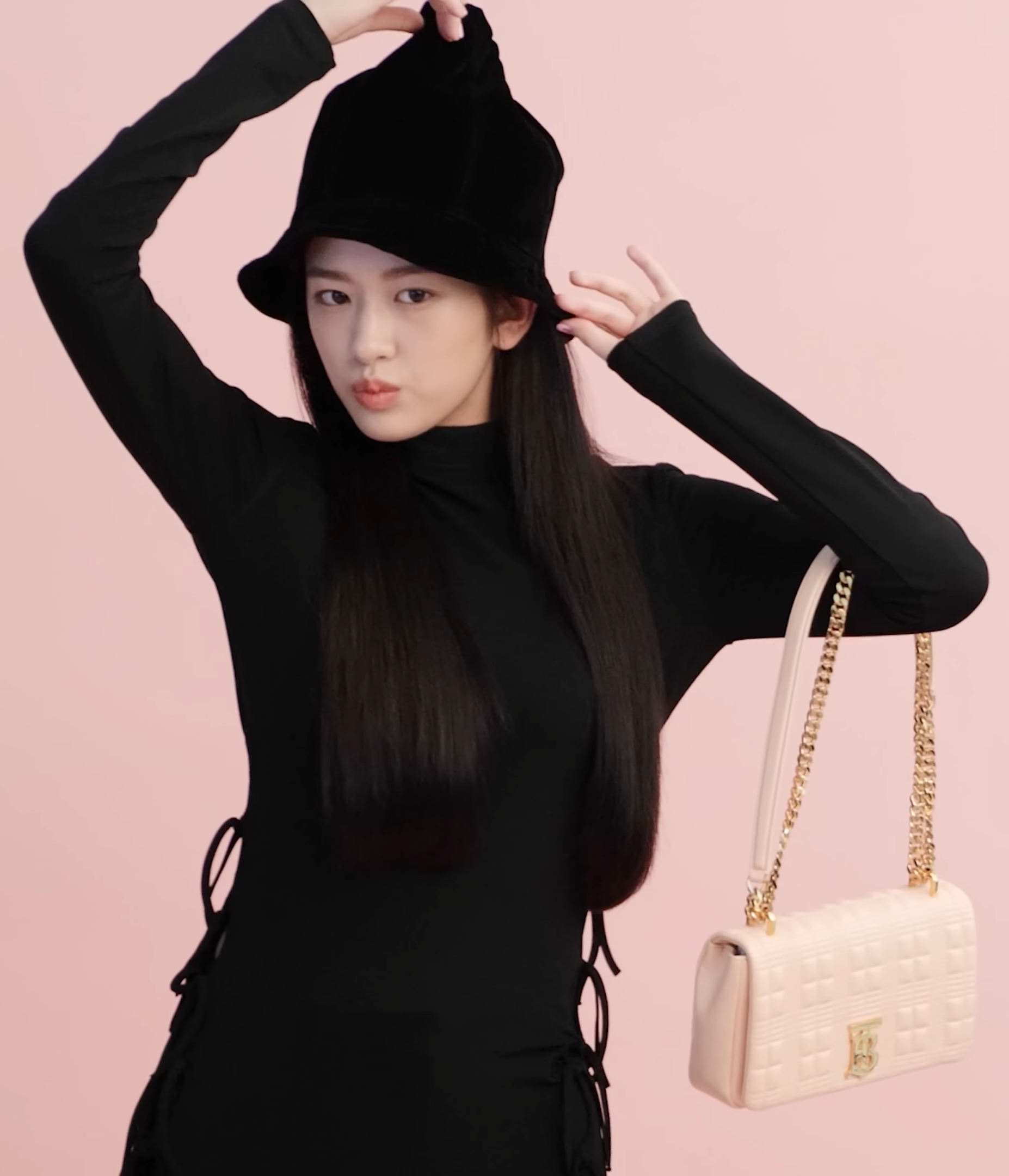
An for Marie Claire Korea in May 2022

An appeared as an actress in commercials and music videos, most notably in an Acuvue Vita commercial prior to her official debut.

In August 2022, An was chosen as the brand model of canned tuna Dongwon Tuna. In December, she was announced as the brand ambassador for Korean cosmetics brand Clio Cosmetics.

In January 2023, An was selected as the brand ambassador for Italian luxury fashion house Fendi. In February 2023, An was chosen as NEPA's new model. The same month, An was selected as the new brand model for Lucky Chouette. In April, An was chosen as the new model for Lotte Chilsung Beverage's carbonated lemon gin. Two months later, An was selected as model for Hana Financial Group. In August, An was reassigned as brand model by Dongwon Tuna.

In June 2024, she was selected as an advertising model for coffee brand Maxim Supreme Gold.

In March 2025, An became the brand ambassador of Amorepacific's skincare brand Labo H, participating in its "Hair, Fill It with Fillers" campaign. In April, it was announced that An became the brand ambassador of Lacoste Korea, participating in its 2025 S/S campaign and representing the brand during the 2025 F/W Paris Fashion Week.

== Discography ==
=== Songs ===
List of songs, showing year released, selected chart positions and album name
| Title | Year | Peak chart positions | Album |
| Title | Year | KOR | Album |
|---|---|---|---|
| "Force" (Note: credited to Ive, but the track is a solo by An Yu-jin) | 2026 | 61 | Revive+ |

=== Promotional singles ===
List of promotional singles, showing year released, selected chart positions and album name
| Title | Year | Peak chart positions | Album |
| Title | Year | KOR DL | Album |
|---|---|---|---|
| "Move Like This" (Note: "Move Like This" was released as a promotional single in collaboration with Gatorade.) (with Kang Daniel featuring Yuna Kim) | 2022 | 25 | Non-album single |

=== Soundtrack appearances ===
List of soundtrack appearances, showing year released, selected chart positions and album name
| Title | Year | Peak chart positions | Album |
| Title | Year | KOR DL | Album |
|---|---|---|---|
| "This Wish" (소원을 빌어) | 2023 | 43 | Wish OST |
| "Dreaming" | 2024 | 28 | The Great OST |
| "Sunny Day" | 2025 | 24 | Resident Playbook OST |
| "Sad Saltiness" (슬픈 짠맛) | 2026 | 34 | The Legend of Kitchen Soldier OST |
"—" denotes releases that did not chart or were not released in that region.

=== Composition credits ===
All song credits are adapted from the Korea Music Copyright Association's database unless stated otherwise.

List of songs, showing year released, artist name, and name of the album
| Title | Year | Artist | Album | Lyricist | Composer |
|---|---|---|---|---|---|
| "With*One" | 2020 | Iz*One | Oneiric Diary | Yes | No |
| "Heroine" | 2023 | Ive | I've Ive | Yes | No |

== Videography ==
=== Music videos ===
| Title | Year | Director(s) | Length | Ref. |
|---|---|---|---|---|
| "Move Like This" (with Kang Daniel featuring Yuna Kim) | 2022 | Young-Ji Choi (PinkLabel Visual) | 3:19 | |
| "Dreaming" | 2024 | SNP Film | 3:19 | |

=== Music video appearances ===
| Year | Song title | Artist | Ref. |
|---|---|---|---|
| 2017 | "Rain" | Soyou & Baekhyun | |
| 2017 | "Oppa" | Yoo Seung-woo & Sandeul | |
| 2017 | "Just U" | Jeong Se-woon (with Sik-K) | |
| 2018 | "Thirst" | Mad Clown & Ailee | |
| 2018 | "Thirst" (Sports Remix By DJ Vanto) | Mad Clown & Ailee | |
| 2026 | "Robot" | Lee Young-ji | |

== Filmography ==
=== Television shows ===
| Year | Title | Role | Notes | Ref. |
|---|---|---|---|---|
| 2018 | Produce 48 | Contestant | Finished in 5th place | |
| 2018 | King of Mask Singer | Contestant | as Icicle (Episode 181) | |
| 2019 | My Little Television V2 | Cast member | | |
| 2021 | King of Mask Singer | Contestant | as Olivia Hussey (Episodes 333–334) | |
| 2022 | Steel Troops | Panelist | Season 2 | |
| 2022–2025 | Earth Arcade | Cast member | Season 1–3 | |
| 2024 | Crime Scene Returns | Cast member | Crime Scene Season 4 | |
| 2024 | Earth Arcade's Vroom Vroom | Cast member | Earth Arcade spinoff | |

=== Web shows ===
| Year | Title | Role | Notes | Ref. |
|---|---|---|---|---|
| 2025 | Crime Scene Zero | Cast member | Crime Scene Season 5 | |

=== Hosting ===
| Year | Title | Notes | Ref. |
|---|---|---|---|
| 2021–2022 | Inkigayo | with Jihoon and Sungchan | |
| 2022 | 28th Dream Concert | with Doyoung | |
| 2022 | SBS Gayo Daejeon | with Key and Cha Eun-woo | |
| 2023 | SBS Gayo Daejeon | with Key and Yeonjun | |
| 2023 | The 15th Melon Music Awards | —N/a | |
| 2024 | SBS Gayo Daejeon | with Doyoung and Yeonjun | |
| 2025 | SBS Gayo Daejeon (Summer) | with Doyoung and Yeonjun | |
| 2025 | SBS Gayo Daejeon | with Jaemin and Young K | |

== Awards and nominations ==
Name of the award ceremony, year presented, category, nominee of the award, and the result of the nomination
| Award ceremony | Year | Category | Nominee / Work | Result | Ref. |
|---|---|---|---|---|---|
| Baeksang Arts Awards | 2024 | Prizm Popularity Award (Female) | An Yu-jin | Won | |
| Baeksang Arts Awards | 2024 | Best Female Variety Performer | An Yu-jin | Nominated | |
| Blue Dragon Series Awards | 2024 | Whynot Award | Crime Scene Returns | Won | |
| Blue Dragon Series Awards | 2026 | OST Popularity Award | "Sad Saltiness" | Won | |
| Brand Customer Loyalty Awards (Note: Co-organized by the Korean Customers Council and Brand Keys, this event recognizes the most influential brands in society and culture, as determined through consumer research.) | 2025 | Female Variety Show Idol | An Yu-jin | Won | |
| Brand of the Year Awards (Note: It is a large-scale brand award that selects and awards the best brands that shined in the year through direct consumer voting.) | 2023 | Female Variety Show Idol | An Yu-jin | Won | |
| Brand of the Year Awards | 2024 | Female Variety Show Idol | An Yu-jin | Won | |
| Brand of the Year Awards | 2025 | Female Variety Show Idol | An Yu-jin | Won | |
| Korea First Brand Awards (Note: The Korea First Brand Awards is hosted by the Korea Consumer Brand Committee and the Korea Consumer Forum. Awards are based on a nationwide survey held in South Korea.) | 2026 | Entertainment Idol | An Yu-jin | Won | |
| Seoul Music Awards | 2025 | OST Award | "Dreaming" | Nominated | |
