= Bang Bang (Ive song) =

Single by Ive

from the album Revive+
- Language: English; Korean
- Released: February 9, 2026
- Length: 2:58
- Label: Starship; Kakao; Columbia
- Composers: Jack Brady; Jordan Roman; Kristin Carpenter; Sarah Troy; MLite
- Lyricists: Seo Ji-eum; Hwang Yu-bin (XYXX); Jang Won-young; Exy

Ive singles chronology
"XOXZ" (2025)	"Bang Bang" (2026)	"Blackhole" (2026)

Music video
- "Bang Bang" on YouTube

Professional ratings
Review scores
Source	Rating
IZM	2.5/5 stars

"Bang Bang" is a song recorded by South Korean girl group Ive for their second studio album Revive+. It was released as the album's pre-release single by Starship Entertainment on February 9, 2026. It was written by Seo Ji-eum, Hwang Yu-bin (XYXX), Jang Won-young and Exy, composed by Jack Brady, Jordan Roman, Kristin Carpenter, Sarah Troy and MLite, and arranged by The Wavys.

"Bang Bang" was a commercial success in South Korea and peaked at number two on the Circle Digital Chart, while also reaching the top ten in Taiwan. The song received several accolades, including Song of the Year at the Melon Music Awards and a nomination for Best Asian Pop Music Performance at the 69th Annual Grammy Awards.

== Background and release ==
On January 21, 2026, it was reported that Ive would be releasing a pre-release single titled "Bang Bang" for their upcoming album in February 2026, with member Jang Won-young taking part in writing the lyrics. From that day to January 24, "Coming Soon" films were released, which revealed that the pre-release single would be released on February 9. The song was confirmed to be titled "Bang Bang" upon the release of a concept film on January 26. On February 2, a short preview of the song was released on TikTok. The music video teaser for the song was released on February 6, followed by teaser photos over the next two days. The song was released alongside its music video on February 9.

== Composition ==
"Bang Bang" was written by Seo Ji-eum, Hwang Yu-bin (XYXX), Jang Won-young and Exy, composed by Jack Brady, Jordan Roman, Kristin Carpenter, Sarah Troy and MLite, and arranged by The Wavys. The song is described as EDM and electronic sound-centric with "an impressive Western swing-infused intro". The straight beat and energetic sound structure musically embodies Ive's unique confident attitude.

== Commercial performance ==
The single reached number one on all major South Korean music charts, becoming the group's sixth release to achieve a perfect-all-kill (PAK) and continuing their record as the girl group with the most PAKs.

== Promotion ==
Ive performed "Bang Bang" on four music programs during their first week of promotion: Mnet's M Countdown on February 12, KBS's Music Bank on February 13, MBC's Show! Music Core on February 14, and SBS's Inkigayo on February 15. Alongside "Blackhole", they concluded their final week of promotions with performances on Show! Music Core on March 7 and Inkigayo on March 8.

== Accolades ==
Awards and nominations for "Bang Bang"
Award ceremony	Year	Category	Result	Ref.
Grammy Awards	2027	Best Asian Pop Music Performance	Pending	
MAMA Awards	2026	Best Dance Performance – Female Group	Pending	
MAMA Awards	2026	Best Choreography	Pending	
Melon Music Awards	2026	Best Music Video	Won	
Melon Music Awards	2026	Song of the Year	Won	

Music program awards for "Bang Bang"
Program	Date	Ref.
Inkigayo	March 1, 2026	
Inkigayo	March 8, 2026	
M Countdown	February 26, 2026	
Music Bank	February 27, 2026	
Music Bank	March 6, 2026	
Music Bank	March 13, 2026	
Show! Music Core	February 28, 2026	
Show! Music Core	March 7, 2026	

== Credits and personnel ==
Credits adopted from the Revive+ liner notes.

Studio

- Ingrid Studio – recording
- 821 Sound Mastering – mastering

Personnel

- Ive – vocals
- Seo Ji-eum – lyrics
- Hwang Yu-bin (XYXX) – lyrics
- Jang Won-young – lyrics
- Exy – lyrics
- Jack Brady – composition
- Jordan Roman – composition
- Kristin Carpenter – composition, background vocals
- Sarah Troy – composition, background vocals
- MLite – composition
- C'Sa – background vocals, digital editing
- The Wavys – arrangement, programming
- Jeong Eun-kyeong – recording (at Ingrid Studio)
- Yang Yeong-eun – recording (at Ingrid Studio)
- Patrizio Pigliapoco – mixing
- Kwon Nam-woo – mastering (at 821 Sound Mastering)

== Charts ==
=== Weekly charts ===
Weekly chart performance for "Bang Bang"
Chart (2026)	Peak position
Global 200 (Billboard)	61
Hong Kong (Billboard)	8
Japan (Japan Hot 100)	21
Japan Combined Singles (Oricon)	23
New Zealand Hot Singles (RMNZ)	17
Singapore (RIAS)	16
South Korea (Circle)	2
South Korea Hot 100 (Billboard)	3
Taiwan (Billboard)	2
US World Digital Song Sales (Billboard)	6

=== Monthly charts ===
Monthly chart performance for "Bang Bang"
Chart (2026)	Position
South Korea (Circle)	3

== Release history ==
Release history for "Bang Bang"
Region	Date	Format	Label
Various	February 9, 2026	Digital download; streaming	Starship; Kakao; Columbia
