= Leeseo =

South Korean singer (born 2007)

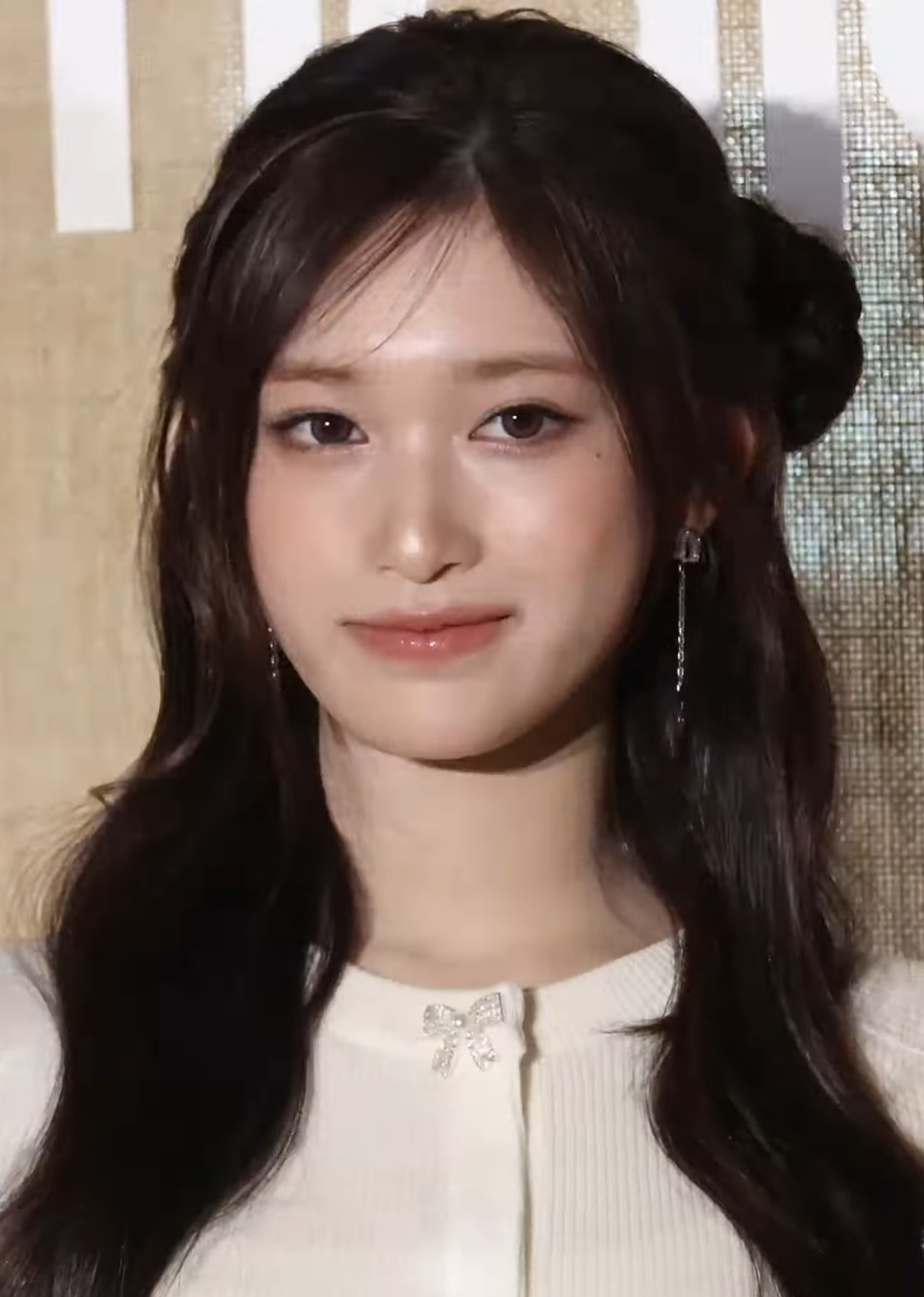
- Leeseo in March 2026
- Born: Lee Hyun-seo; February 21, 2007 (age 19); South Korea
- Education: Hanlim Multi Art School
- Occupation: Singer
- Musical career
- Genre: K-pop
- Instrument: Vocals
- Years active: 2021–present
- Label: Starship
- Member of: Ive

Korean name
- Hangul: 이현서
- RR: I Hyeonseo
- MR: I Hyŏnsŏ

Stage name
- Hangul: 이서
- RR: Iseo
- MR: Isŏ

Signature
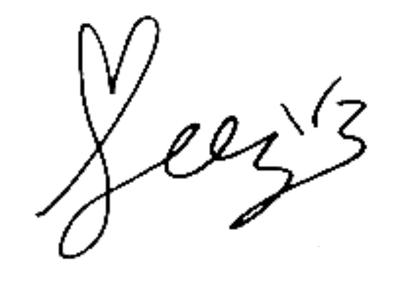

Lee Hyun-seo (Korean: 이현서; born February 21, 2007), known professionally as Leeseo, is a South Korean singer. She is a member of the South Korean girl group Ive under Starship Entertainment.

== Early life and education ==
Leeseo was born on February 21, 2007, in South Korea. She was a former kids model at SM Entertainment.

In 2009, she became a viral sensation due to a moment with actress Han Hyo-joo in the SBS program One Night of TV Entertainment (also known as HanBam).

Leeseo attended Seoul Jamwon Elementary School and Bangbae Middle School before graduating from Hanlim Multi Art School on January 8, 2026, focusing on the broadcasting and entertainment department.

== Career ==
=== 2021–present: Debut with Ive and solo activities ===
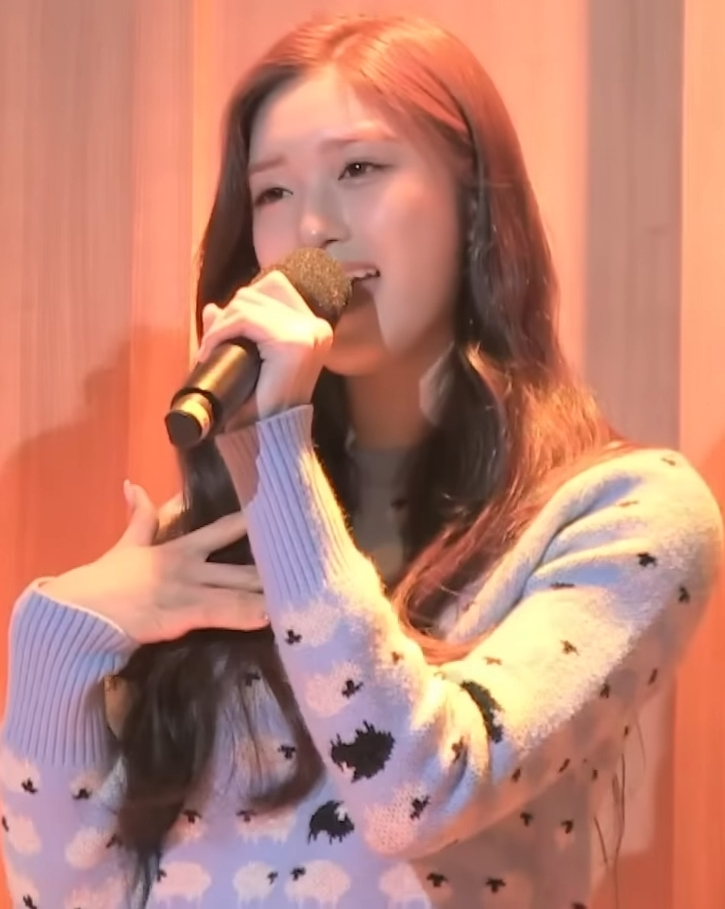
Leeseo in December 2021

On November 6, 2021, Starship Entertainment revealed Leeseo as one of the six members of their new girl group, Ive. Leeseo was the last and final member to be introduced and as one of the group's vocalist. On December 1, 2021, Leeseo officially debuted as a member of Ive with the release of their single album, Eleven, led by the single of the same name, which topped all South Korean charts upon debut. Later on, they won both the Rookie of the Year award and the Song of the Year Daesang (grand prize) award. On June 6, 2022, it was announced that some members of Ive, Oh My Girl, and Cravity would be collaborating on a digital single, to be released as part of the ongoing collaboration project from Starship Entertainment and Pepsi. That same day, the members of the groups who would be participating were revealed, including Leeseo and Wonyoung. The collaborative single, titled "Blue & Black", was released on June 28. On November 8, 2022, Starship Entertainment announced that Leeseo had been accepted at Hanlim Multi Art School, in the Broadcasting and Entertainment department. On February 22, 2024, Leeseo released the OST song "May Lily" for the webtoon series I'm the Queen in This Life. On April 11, 2024, she was announced as the new MC of the program Inkigayo, alongside Zerobaseone's Han Yu-jin and Moon Seong-hyun. She stepped down from the role on December 7, 2025; after 1 year and 7 months.

In January 2026, Leeseo graduated from Hanlim Multi Art School in Seoul.

== Other ventures ==
=== Endorsements ===
Leeseo has appeared in various Korean fashion magazines. In September 2022, she featured in Marie Claire Korea's September issue. In December 2022, she starred in a beauty pictorial for Dazed Korea with Kiehl's. She then served as a YK Edition cover model for L'Officiel Korea's Spring/Summer 2024 issue with her group members Rei, Gaeul, and Liz. she has also continued her presence in fashion editorials. In March 2026, she appeared in Cosmopolitan Korea, Gucci for the magazine's March issue. In May 2026,she appeared in Y magazine digital photo shoot featuring the jewelry brand Tasaki

Leeseo has attended various pop-up stores and fashion events. In October 2022, she visited Häagen-Dazs "Melting Point" pop-up store. On May 16, 2023, she attended Gucci's 2024 Cruise fashion show. On June 28, 2023, she attended Chanel Code Color pop-up store opening photocall. On October 22, 2024, Leeseo attended the Gucci Cultural Month photo exhibition photocall. On February 21, 2025, she participated in a fashion brand Coach photocall on her birthday. On March 19, 2026, she attended the Maje 2026 Spring/Summer collection presentation.

On August 18, 2023, Leeseo was chosen as a model for The North Face, an American outdoor brand. She was chosen for her youthful and healthy energy, as well as her luxurious yet unique charms, which matched the brand's image. In August 2025, Leeseo was selected as the brand model for the beauty and skincare brand The Saem. In December 2025, she became the brand model for National Geographic Apparel, participating in its "School in Style" campaign. In June 2026, Leeseo was chosen as the new global muse for the Korean cosmetic brand LIZDA.

== Discography ==
=== Songs ===
List of songs, with selected chart positions, showing year released and album name
| Title | Year | Peak chart positions | Album |
| Title | Year | KOR DL | Album |
|---|---|---|---|
| "Super Icy" (Note: credited to Ive, but the track is a solo by Leeseo) | 2026 | 26 | Revive+ |

=== Soundtrack appearances ===
List of soundtrack appearances, with selected chart positions
| Title | Year | Peak chart positions | Album |
| Title | Year | KOR DL | Album |
|---|---|---|---|
| "May Lily" | 2024 | 53 | I'm the Queen in This Life OST |

=== Promotional singles ===
List of promotional singles, with selected chart positions
| Title | Year | Peak chart positions | Album |
| Title | Year | KOR DL | Album |
|---|---|---|---|
| "Blue & Black" (Note: "Blue & Black" was released as a promotional single in collaboration with Pepsi.) (with Jang Won-young, Hyojung, Arin, Serim & Jungmo) | 2022 | 35 | Non-album promotional single |

=== Composition credits ===
All song credits are adapted from the Korea Music Copyright Association's database unless stated otherwise.

List of songs, showing year released, artist name, and name of the album
| Title | Year | Artist | Album | Lyricist | Composer |
|---|---|---|---|---|---|
| "Super Icy" (Note: Originally performed by Leeseo at Ive's Show What I Am World Tour.) | 2026 | Herself | Revive+ | Yes | No |

== Filmography ==
=== Hosting ===
| Year | Title | Note(s) | Ref. |
|---|---|---|---|
| 2024–2025 | Inkigayo | with Moon Seong-hyun, Han Yu-jin, Shinyu, and EJ | |

== Videography ==
=== Music videos ===
| Title | Year | Director(s) | Ref. |
|---|---|---|---|
| "Blue & Black" (with Jang Won-young, Hyojung, Arin, Serim & Jungmo) | 2022 | Choi Young-ji (PinkLabel Visual) | |
