= Revive+ =

- Digital cover

Studio album by Ive
- Released: February 23, 2026
- Length: 34:14
- Languages: Korean; English
- Labels: Starship; Kakao; Columbia

Ive chronology
Ive Secret (2025)	Revive+ (2026)	Lucid Dream (2026)

Singles from Revive+
- 1. "Bang Bang" Released: February 9, 2026; 2. "Blackhole" Released: February 23, 2026

Professional ratings
Review scores
Source	Rating
IZM	2.5/5 stars

Revive+ is the second studio album by South Korean girl group Ive. It was released by Starship Entertainment on February 23, 2026, and contains twelve tracks, including the pre-release single "Bang Bang" and lead single "Blackhole". The album also includes the solo songs performed by each member at the group's Show What I Am World Tour.

== Background and release ==
On January 16, 2026, Starship Entertainment announced that Ive would be releasing a new album towards the end of February. Individual "Coming Soon" films were released on January 21 for members Jang Won-young and Leeseo, January 22 for Rei and Liz, and January 23 for Gaeul and An Yu-jin, followed by a director's cut on January 24, which revealed that a pre-release single would be released on February 9 ahead of the upcoming album. On January 25, with the release of "Spoilers Alert" photos, it was confirmed that Ive's second studio album titled Revive+ would be released on February 23. The pre-release single was also confirmed to be titled "Bang Bang" upon the release of a "Spoilers" concept film on January 26. "Spoilers" concept photos were released on January 27 and 28, with the promotion schedule revealed on the latter day. On January 30 and 31, "Challengers Alert" photos and the "Challengers" concept film were released respectively. "Challengers" concept photos were released from February 1 to 4. The music video teaser and teaser photos for "Bang Bang" were released from February 6 to 8. On February 9, "Bang Bang" was released alongside its music video.

On February 10, with the release of a new promotion schedule, the lead single was confirmed to be titled "Blackhole". The next series of promotional materials titled "The Narcissistic Gurls Campaign" began with the release of a film on February 12 , followed by materials for members Jang and Leeseo on February 13, An and Rei on February 14, and Gaeul and Liz on February 15. On February 16, the highlight medley video of the album's tracks was released, which includes solo songs by each individual member that were previously performed at the group's Show What I Am World Tour. The "Bangers" concept film was released on February 17, followed by "Bangers" concept photos from February 18 to 19. On February 20, a spoiler video and teaser photos for "Blackhole" were released. The music video teaser for "Blackhole" was released on the following day. The album was released alongside the music video for "Blackhole" on February 23.

== Track listing ==
Revive+ track listing
No.	Title	Lyrics	Music	Arrangement(s)	Length
1.	"Blackhole"	Seo Ji-eum; Hwang Yu-bin (XYXX)	Lee Chae-heon; Sophie Rose; Sarah Troy; Kristin Carpenter; MLite	Lee Chae-heon; Ido Nadjar	3:14
2.	"Bang Bang"	Seo Ji-eum; Hwang Yu-bin (XYXX); Jang Won-young; Exy	Jack Brady; Jordan Roman; Kristin Carpenter; Sarah Troy; MLite	The Wavys	2:58
3.	"Hush" (숨바꼭질; Sumbakkokjil; 'Hide and seek')	Seo Jeong-ah	Jack Brady; Jordan Roman; Emma Rosen; Mathilde Nyegaard; MLite	The Wavys	2:47
4.	"Stuck in Your Head" (악성코드; Akseongkodeu; 'Malware')	Hwang Yu-bin (XYXX)	Jack Brady; Jordan Roman; Emma Rosen; Mathilde Nyegaard; MLite	The Wavys	2:47
5.	"Fireworks"	Seo Jeong-ah	Audun Agnar Gulbranden; Gucci Caliente; Ido Nadjar; Mathilde Nyegaard; Lauren Aquilina; MLite	Audun Agnar Gulbranden; Gucci Caliente; Ido Nadjar	3:00
6.	"Hot Coffee"	Jo Yoon-kyung	Gucci Caliente; Kristine Bogan; Young Chance; MLite	Gucci Caliente; Young Chance	2:48
7.	"8" (Jang Won-young solo)	Jang Won-young	Simon Klose; Arineh Karimi; MLite	Simon Klose	2:51
8.	"Odd" (Gaeul solo)	Gaeul; Ahn Young-ju	Peter Rycroft; Tom Mann; Sara Boe; Tove Burman; MLite	Lostboy	2:50
9.	"Super Icy" (Leeseo solo)	Leeseo; Jo Yoon-kyung	Lewis Jankel; Conor Blake; Jordan Shaw; Lauren Aquilina; MLite	Shift K3y	2:50
10.	"Unreal" (Liz solo)	Liz	Willie Weeks; Paulina "Pau" Cerrilla; Ryan Curtis; MLite	Willie Weeks	2:42
11.	"In Your Heart" (Rei solo)	Rei; Rick Bridges	Rick Bridges; Steven; Deevan; Rei	Steven; Deevan	2:03
12.	"Force" (An Yu-jin solo)	Kim Hye-i (Artiffect)	Dwayne Abernathy Jr.; Jazelle Rodriguez; Ido Nadjar; MLite	Dem Jointz; Ido Nadjar	3:24
Total length:					34:14

== Charts ==
=== Weekly charts ===
Weekly chart performance for Revive+
Chart (2026)	Peak position
Belgian Albums (Ultratop Flanders)	137
French Physical Albums (SNEP)	59
Japanese Albums (Oricon)	7
Japanese Combined Albums (Oricon)	8
Japanese Hot Albums (Billboard Japan)	7
South Korean Albums (Circle)	2
US Top Album Sales (Billboard)	11
US Independent Albums (Billboard)	36
US World Albums (Billboard)	3

=== Monthly charts ===
Monthly chart performance for Revive+
Chart (2026)	Position
Japanese Albums (Oricon)	14
South Korean Albums (Circle)	2

== Certifications ==
Certifications for Revive+
Region	Certification	Certified units/sales
South Korea (KMCA)	3× Platinum	750,000^{^}
^{^} Shipments figures based on certification alone.

== Release history ==
Release history for Revive+
Region	Date	Format	Label	Ref.
Various	February 23, 2026	Digital download; streaming	Starship; Kakao; Columbia	
South Korea	February 23, 2026	CD	Starship; Kakao; Columbia	
South Korea	September 30, 2026	Vinyl LP	Starship; Kakao; Columbia	
