= Jang Won-young =

South Korean singer-songwriter (born 2004)

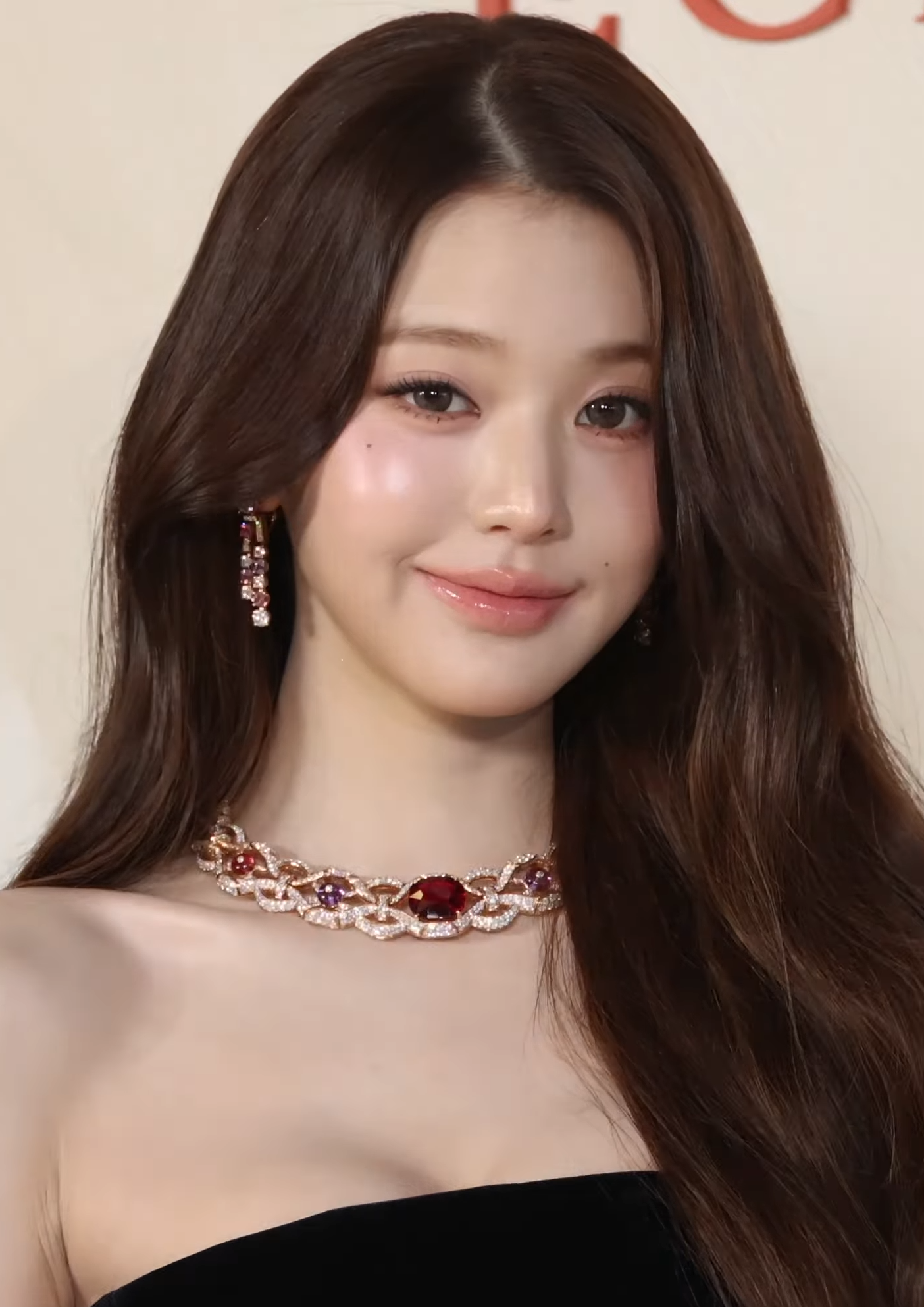
- Jang in 2026
- Born: August 31, 2004 (age 22); Seoul, South Korea
- Education: School of Performing Arts Seoul
- Occupation: Singer-songwriter
- Relatives: Jang Da-ah (sister)
- Musical career
- Genres: K-pop; J-pop
- Instrument: Vocals
- Years active: 2018–present
- Labels: Starship; Off the Record (Note: As a member of Iz*One only.); EMI; Columbia (Note: As a member of Ive only.)
- Member of: Ive
- Formerly of: Iz*One

Korean name
- Hangul: 장원영
- RR: Jang Wonyeong
- MR: Chang Wŏnyŏng

Jang Won-young (Korean: 장원영; born August 31, 2004) is a South Korean singer-songwriter. She is a member of the South Korean girl group Ive under Starship Entertainment and former member of project girl group Iz*One, having finished first in Mnet's girl group survival reality television show Produce 48 in 2018.

== Early life and education ==
Jang was born on August 31, 2004, in Ichon-dong, Seoul, South Korea. Her older sister, Jang Da-ah, is an actress.

In April 2019, Jang withdrew from Yonggang Middle School to continue her education through homeschooling. She subsequently passed the middle school equivalency examination, receiving perfect scores in Korean, English, and mathematics. She graduated from the School of Performing Arts Seoul in February 2023.

== Career ==
=== 2018–2020: Produce 48 and Iz*One ===
In 2018, Jang represented Starship Entertainment on Mnet's reality competition series Produce 48. She finished first and debuted as a member of the resulting group Iz*One.

Iz*One debuted on October 29, 2018, with the extended play Color*Iz and its lead single "La Vie en Rose". The group received several rookie awards, including at the Golden Disc Awards and Seoul Music Awards. It subsequently debuted in Japan with the single "Suki to Iwasetai" in February 2019. During the group's Japanese promotions, Jang and fellow member Sakura Miyawaki participated in a collaborative performance with members of Nogizaka46, Keyakizaka46, and AKB48 at the FNS Music Festival.

In September 2019, Jang made her runway debut at Tokyo Girls Collection. She also appeared at the festival's Kitakyushu edition later that year.

Jang made her songwriting debut with "Dreamlike", a track from Iz*One's first Korean-language studio album, Bloom*Iz, released in February 2020. Music publication Beats Per Minute ranked the track 19th on its list of the best songs of 2020.

=== 2021–present: Ive, Music Bank, and solo activities ===
Following Iz*One's disbandment in April 2021, Jang returned to Starship Entertainment. In September, she became a host of the KBS music program Music Bank alongside Sunghoon of Enhypen. The pair received the Best Couple Award at the 2021 KBS Entertainment Awards. Jang continued hosting Music Bank until January 2023.

In November 2021, Jang was announced as a member of Starship Entertainment's new girl group Ive. The group debuted on December 1 with the single album Eleven.

Alongside her music career, Jang hosted the Asia Artist Awards annually from 2021 to 2025, initially alongside Leeteuk and subsequently with other co-hosts. She also hosted the KBS year-end music festivals for three consecutive years from 2022 to 2024.

In April 2023, Ive released its first studio album, I've Ive, featuring two songs written by Jang, "Mine" and "Shine with Me". She subsequently wrote "OTT" for the group's EP I've Mine, released in October 2023.

In April 2024, Jang wrote "Blue Heart" for Ive's EP Ive Switch. In an interview with Nylon, she stated that the song was inspired by her experiences of scrutiny directed at women in the entertainment industry.

Jang continued contributing lyrics to Ive's releases in 2025, including "Attitude" from Ive Empathy and "XOXZ" from Ive Secret. "Attitude" reached number seven on the Circle Digital Chart, while Billboard included "XOXZ" on its list of the best K-pop songs of 2025.

In November 2025, Jang performed her first solo song, "8", during Ive's Show What I Am World Tour. The song, which she co-wrote, was subsequently released on the group's second studio album, Revive+, and peaked at number 17 on the Circle Digital Chart. She also co-wrote "Bang Bang", released as a pre-release single from the album in February 2026.

== Public image and influence ==
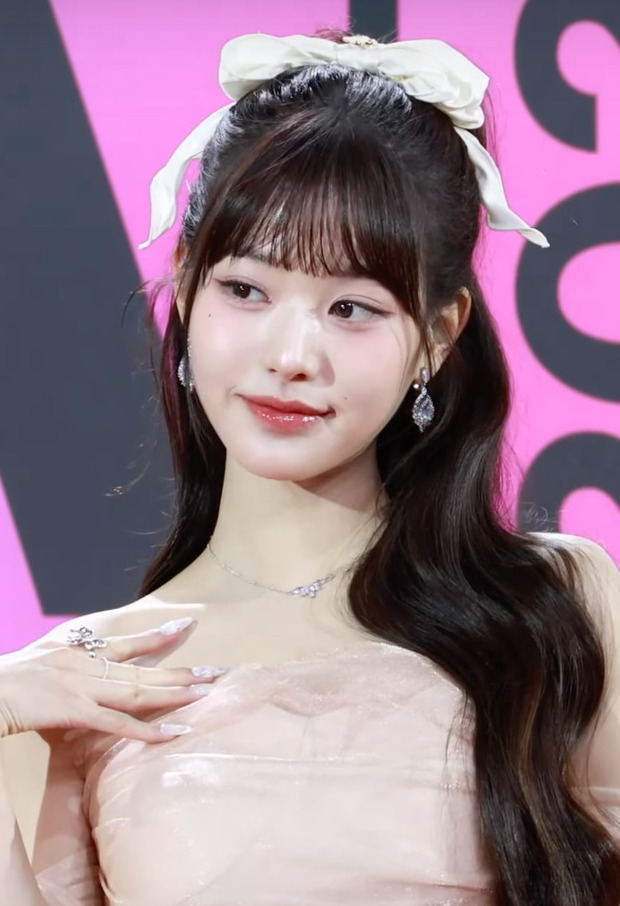
Jang at the 2023 Melon Music Awards

Jang has received media attention for her influence in fashion, advertising, and popular culture. She has been referred to as a "fourth-generation It girl" and a "thousand-year idol" by South Korean media outlets. In 2026, she ranked 29th on the Forbes Korea Power Celebrity 40 list, which highlighted her activities in fashion, advertising, and social media.

Her appearances at Paris Fashion Week have attracted attention in fashion media. Following the, Spring/Summer 2024 shows, influencer marketing platform Lefty ranked Jang 13th among the event's leading influencers and estimated that her appearance generated $3 million in earned media value for Miu Miu. Her participation in subsequent fashion events has also been examined in reports on celebrity influence and brand exposure.

Jang's advertising activities have been discussed in relation to the commercial performance of brands she represents. Following her appointment as an ambassador for contact lens brand Hapa Kristin in 2022, the company reported a 40.3% increase in sales the following year. The brand subsequently expanded internationally, including into the United States. Media coverage of its expansion identified marketing campaigns featuring Jang as one factor contributing to its growth.

Jang also popularized the expression "Lucky Vicky", derived from her English name, Vicky, and associated with an optimistic way of interpreting everyday situations. The expression gained popularity in South Korea and was adopted in commercial marketing. In November 2024, Baskin-Robbins introduced a product named "Lucky Vicky Mochi", but discontinued it following criticism that the company had used the expression without Jang's permission.

In January 2025, Jang appeared on the television talk show You Quiz on the Block, where she discussed the book Buddha's Words (초역 부처의 말) by Ryunosuke Koike. Following the broadcast, the book rose on several South Korean bestseller lists. In October 2025, Jang appeared in an official promotional video for the 2025 APEC summit in South Korea, alongside other South Korean public figures, including President Lee Jae Myung.

== Other ventures ==
=== Endorsements ===
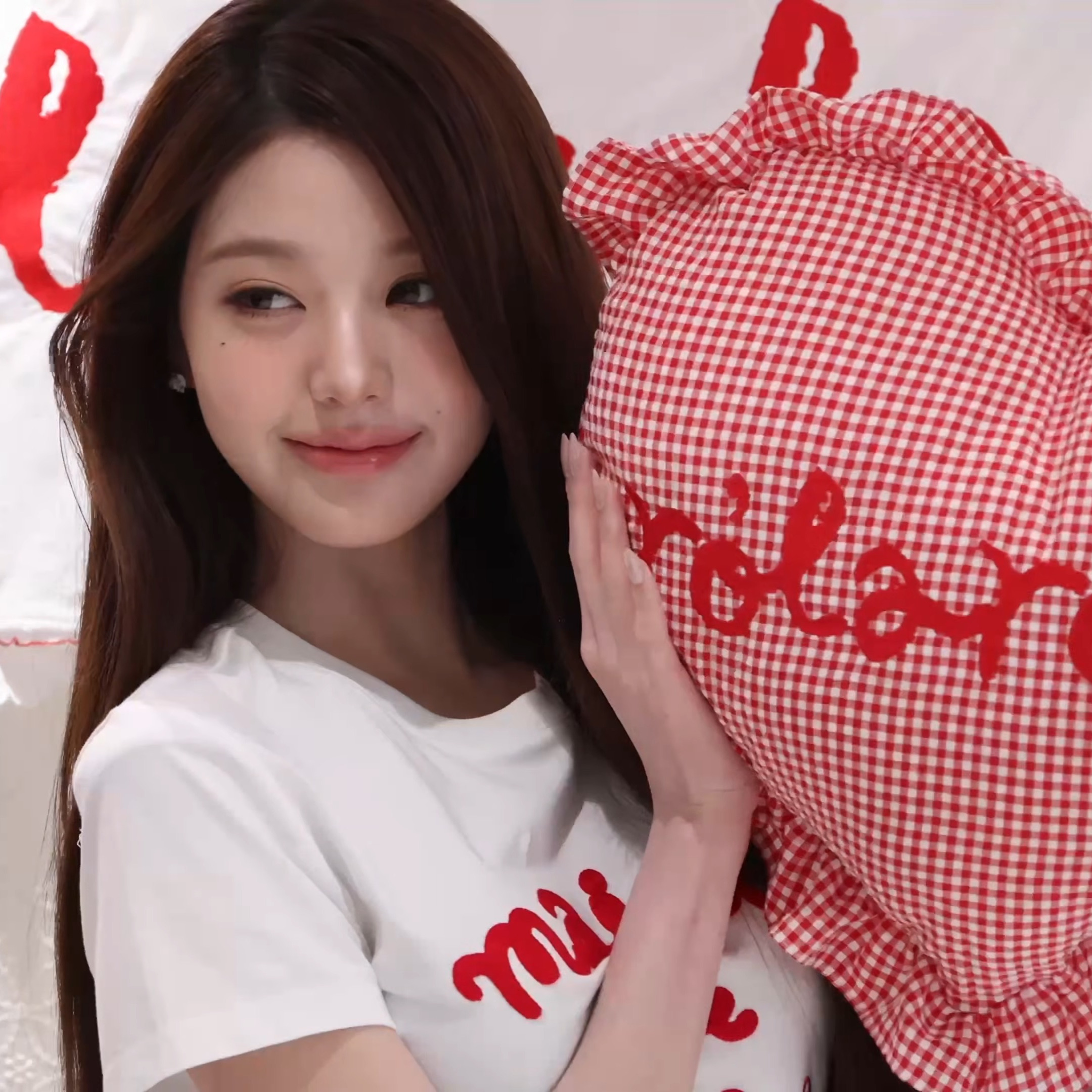
Jang at a Rolarola brand event in 2026

Jang has represented numerous fashion, beauty, and consumer brands since her debut. During her activities with Iz*One, she appeared in fashion publications and campaigns associated with brands including Dior and Miu Miu.

In 2021, she became a global ambassador for cosmetics brand Innisfree, and was subsequently appointed a brand ambassador for Miu Miu.

In subsequent years, Jang represented brands including Tommy Jeans, Woori Bank, Dyson, Medicube, Bulgari, and UGG. In 2026, she collaborated with Medicube on the "Forever Cherry" product line, which reportedly sold more than 100,000 units within two months of its launch.

== Discography ==
=== Songs ===
List of songs, with selected chart positions, showing year released and album name
Title	Year	Peak chart positions	Album
Title	Year	KOR	Album
"8" (Note: credited to Ive, but the track is a solo by Jang Won-young) (Note: Originally performed by Jang at Ive's Show What I Am World Tour.)	2026	17	Revive+

=== Promotional singles ===
List of promotional singles, with selected chart positions
Title	Year	Peak chart positions	Album
Title	Year	KOR DL	Album
"Blue & Black" (Note: "Blue & Black" was released as a promotional single in collaboration with Pepsi.) (with Leeseo, Hyojung, Arin, Serim & Jungmo)	2022	35	Non-album promotional single

=== Composition credits ===
All song credits are adapted from the Korea Music Copyright Association's database unless stated otherwise.

List of songs, showing year released, artist name, and name of the album
Title	Year	Artist	Album	Lyricist	Composer
"Dreamlike"	2020	Iz*One	Bloom*Iz	Yes	No
"With*One"	2020	Iz*One	Oneiric Diary	Yes	No
"Mine"	2023	Ive	I've Ive	Yes	No
"Shine With Me"	2023	Ive	I've Ive	Yes	No
"OTT"	2023	Ive	I've Mine	Yes	No
"Blue Heart"	2024	Ive	Ive Switch	Yes	No
"Attitude"	2025	Ive	Ive Empathy	Yes	No
"XOXZ"	2025	Ive	Ive Secret	Yes	No
"Bang Bang"	2026	Ive	Revive+	Yes	No
"8"	2026	Herself	Revive+	Yes	No

== Videography ==
=== Music videos ===
Title	Year	Director(s)	Length	Ref.
"Blue & Black" (with Leeseo, Hyojung, Arin, Serim & Jungmo)	2022	Choi Young-ji (PinkLabel Visual)	3:37	

=== Music video appearances ===
Year	Song title	Artist	Ref.
2018	"Love It Live It"	YDPP	

== Filmography ==
=== Television shows ===
Year	Title	Role	Notes	Ref.
2018	Produce 48	Contestant	Finished in 1st place	
2019	Happy Together	Special host	with Kim Min-ju	

=== Hosting ===
Year	Title	Notes	Ref.
2021–2023	Music Bank	with Sunghoon and Lee Chae-min	
2021	6th Asia Artist Awards	with Leeteuk	
2021	2021 KBS Song Festival	with Arin, Soobin, and Sunghoon	
2022	7th Asia Artist Awards	with Leeteuk	
2022	2022 KBS Song Festival	with Kim Shin-young and Na In-woo	
2023	2023 KCON LA	on the Friday night first concert	
2023	8th Asia Artist Awards	with Kang Daniel and Sung Han-bin	
2023	2023 KBS Music Bank Global Festival	with Rowoon	
2024	9th Asia Artist Awards	with Sung Han-bin and Ryu Jun-yeol	
2024	2024 KBS Music Bank Global Festival	with Zico and Kim Young-dae	
2025	10th Asia Artist Awards	with Lee Jun-ho	
2025	2025 KBS Music Bank Global Festival in Japan	with Lee Jun-young	
2026	11th Asia Artist Awards		

== Accolades ==
=== Awards and nominations ===
Name of the award ceremony, year presented, category, nominee of the award, and the result of the nomination
Award ceremony	Year	Category	Nominee / Work	Result	Ref.
Asia Artist Awards	2023	Asia Celebrity Award – Music	Jang Won-young	Won	
Asia Artist Awards	2024	Asia Celebrity Award – Music	Jang Won-young	Won	
Asia Artist Awards	2024	Queen of AAA	Jang Won-young	Won	
Asia Artist Awards	2025	Asia Celebrity Award – Music	Jang Won-young	Won	
Asia Artist Awards	2025	Grand Presence of K-pop	Jang Won-young	Won	
Asia Artist Awards	2025	Symbol of AAA	Jang Won-young	Won	
Brand of the Year Awards (Note: It is a large-scale brand award that selects and awards the best brands that shined in the year through direct consumer voting.)	2025	Female Advertising Model of the Year	Jang Won-young	Won	
Brand of the Year Awards	2026	Female Advertising Model of the Year	Jang Won-young	Won	
K-World Dream Awards	2025	Solo Artist Popularity Award	Jang Won-young	Won	
KBS Entertainment Awards	2021	Best Couple Award	Jang Won-young (with Park Sung-hoon); Music Bank	Won	
KBS Entertainment Awards	2021	Rookie Award in Show/Variety Category	Music Bank	Nominated	
Korea Youth Hope Awards	2022	Korea Youth Hope Award (Entertainment)	Jang Won-young	Won	

=== Listicles ===
Name of publisher, year listed, name of listicle, and placement
Publisher	Year	Listicle	Placement	Ref.
Forbes	2026	Forbes Korea Power Celebrity 40	29th	
