= Ive Secret =

- Digital cover

EP by Ive
- Released: August 25, 2025
- Length: 17:15
- Languages: Korean; English
- Labels: Starship; Kakao; Columbia

Ive chronology
Be Alright (2025)	Ive Secret (2025)	Revive+ (2026)

Singles from Ive Secret
- 1. "XOXZ" Released: August 25, 2025

Ive Secret is the fourth Korean-language extended play and seventh overall by South Korean girl group Ive. It was released by Starship Entertainment on August 25, 2025, and contains six tracks, including the lead single "XOXZ".

== Background and release ==
On July 24, 2025, it was reported that Ive was preparing for a comeback aimed towards the end of August. On August 1, upon the release of moving posters, Starship Entertainment announced that Ive would be releasing their fourth extended play titled Ive Secret on August 25, with the lead single "XOXZ". On August 5, the group launched a new Instagram account showcasing promotional materials, which marked the official start of promotions. After the release of a trailer video on August 8, trailer photos were released over the following two days.

On August 12, the track listing was revealed. A poster in collaboration with street artist Doezny was released on the next day. The first mood sampler video was released on August 14, followed by concept photos over the next two days. The second set of mood sampler video and concept photos were released from August 18 to 20. The music video teaser for "XOXZ" and the highlight medley video of the album's tracks were released on August 22 and 24 respectively. The extended play was released alongside the music video for "XOXZ" on August 25.

== Promotion ==
Ive embarked on the Show What I Am World Tour in October 2025 in support of the extended play.

== Track listing ==
Ive Secret track listing
No.	Title	Lyrics	Music	Arrangement	Length
1.	"XOXZ"	Seo Ji-eum; Hwang Yu-bin (XYXX); Jang Won-young	Diederik van Elsas; Parrish Warrington; Julie Frost; Emma Rosen; Kristin Carpenter	Trackside; MLite	2:34
2.	"Wild Bird"	Seo Jeong-ah	Jeppe London Bilsby; Clara Hangman; Sam Merrifield; Musikality	Jeppe London Bilsby	2:43
3.	"Dear, My Feelings"	Jinooya	Melanie Fontana; Lindgren; GG Ramirez; Lena Leon; A-Dee	Lindgren; A-Dee	3:13
4.	"Gotcha (Baddest Eros)"	Hwang Ha-ha (Full8loom)	Mike Gonek; Cameron Hunter; Sophie Powers; MLite	Mike Gonek	2:31
5.	"♥ Beats" (삐빅)	Seo Jeong-ah	Adam Kapit; 1-800-Rudeboy; Gabi Gotts; MLite	Adam Kapit	2:30
6.	"Midnight Kiss"	Jo Yoon-kyung; Liz	Askjell Solstrand; Marcus White; Kristin Carpenter; MLite	Askjell Solstrand	3:44
Total length:					17:15

== Charts ==
=== Weekly charts ===
Weekly chart performance for Ive Secret
Chart (2025–2026)	Peak position
Croatian International Albums (HDU)	30
Hungarian Physical Albums (MAHASZ)	23
Japanese Albums (Oricon)	4
Japanese Combined Albums (Oricon)	4
Japanese Hot Albums (Billboard Japan)	10
South Korean Albums (Circle)	1
US Top Album Sales (Billboard)	16
US World Albums (Billboard)	4

=== Monthly charts ===
Monthly chart performance for Ive Secret
Chart (2025)	Position
Japanese Albums (Oricon)	16
South Korean Albums (Circle)	2

=== Year-end charts ===
Year-end chart performance for Ive Secret
Chart (2025)	Position
Japanese Albums (Oricon)	85
South Korean Albums (Circle)	19

== Certifications ==
Certifications for Ive Secret
Region	Certification	Certified units/sales
South Korea (KMCA)	Million	1,000,000^{^}
^{^} Shipments figures based on certification alone.

== Release history ==
Release history for Ive Secret
Region	Date	Format	Label
South Korea	August 25, 2025	CD	Starship; Kakao; Columbia
Various	August 25, 2025	Digital download; streaming	Starship; Kakao; Columbia
United States	September 19, 2025	CD	The Orchard
