= XOXZ =

Single by Ive

from the EP Ive Secret
- Language: Korean; English
- Released: August 25, 2025
- Length: 2:34
- Label: Starship; Kakao; Columbia
- Composers: Diederik van Elsas; Parrish Warrington; Julie Frost; Emma Rosen; Kristin Carpenter
- Lyricists: Seo Ji-eum; Hwang Yu-bin (XYXX); Jang Won-young

Ive singles chronology
| "Be Alright" (2025) | "XOXZ" (2025) | "Bang Bang" (2026) |

Music video
- "XOXZ" on YouTube

Professional ratings
Review scores
| Source | Rating |
|---|---|
| IZM | 3/5 stars |

"XOXZ" is a song recorded by South Korean girl group Ive for their fourth Korean extended play Ive Secret. It was released as the EP's lead single by Starship Entertainment on August 25, 2025.

== Background and release ==
After Ive unveiled a short snippet of their upcoming song at the 2025 SBS Gayo Daejeon Summer in July 2025, Starship Entertainment confirmed on August 1 that the song titled "XOXZ" would serve as the lead single for the group's fourth extended play Ive Secret, set for release on August 25. On August 22, the music video teaser for the song was released. On August 24, a preview of the song was released as part of a highlight medley video for the extended play. The song was released alongside its music video on August 25 upon the release of the extended play.

== Composition ==
"XOXZ" was written by Seo Ji-eum, Hwang Yu-bin (XYXX), and Jang Won-young, composed by Diederik van Elsas, Parrish Warrington, Julie Frost, Emma Rosen and Kristin Carpenter, and arranged by Trackside and MLite. It was described as a song that "sensibly unravels complex emotions like a code" and conveys the message "I love you, good night, and see you in my dreams", highlighting Ive's chic and secretive charm. With 808 bass, brass, and drums creating heavy tension, the addition of low-pitched rap and minimal vocals completes Ive's sophisticated uniqueness.

== Promotion ==
Ive performed "XOXZ" on four music programs in the first week of promotion: Mnet's M Countdown on August 28, KBS's Music Bank on August 29, MBC's Show! Music Core on August 30, and SBS's Inkigayo on August 31.

== Accolades ==
Music program awards for "XOXZ"
| Program | Date | Ref. |
|---|---|---|
| Inkigayo | September 7, 2025 | |
| Inkigayo | October 19, 2025 | |
| Music Bank | September 5, 2025 | |
| Show! Music Core | September 6, 2025 | |
| Show! Music Core | October 18, 2025 | |

== Charts ==
=== Weekly charts ===
Weekly chart performance for "XOXZ"
| Chart (2025) | Peak position |
|---|---|
| Global 200 (Billboard) | 89 |
| Hong Kong (Billboard) | 10 |
| Japan (Japan Hot 100) | 31 |
| Japan Combined Singles (Oricon) | 31 |
| New Zealand Hot Singles (RMNZ) | 32 |
| Singapore (RIAS) | 25 |
| South Korea (Circle) | 6 |
| South Korea Hot 100 (Billboard) | 54 |
| Taiwan (Billboard) | 4 |

=== Monthly charts ===
Monthly chart performance for "XOXZ"
| Chart (2025) | Peak position |
|---|---|
| South Korea (Circle) | 7 |

=== Year-end charts ===
Year-end chart performance for "XOXZ"
| Chart (2025) | Position |
|---|---|
| South Korea (Circle) | 91 |

== Release history ==
Release history for "XOXZ"
| Region | Date | Format | Label |
|---|---|---|---|
| Various | August 25, 2025 | Digital download; streaming | Starship; Kakao; Columbia |
