= Liz (South Korean singer) =

South Korean singer (born 2004)

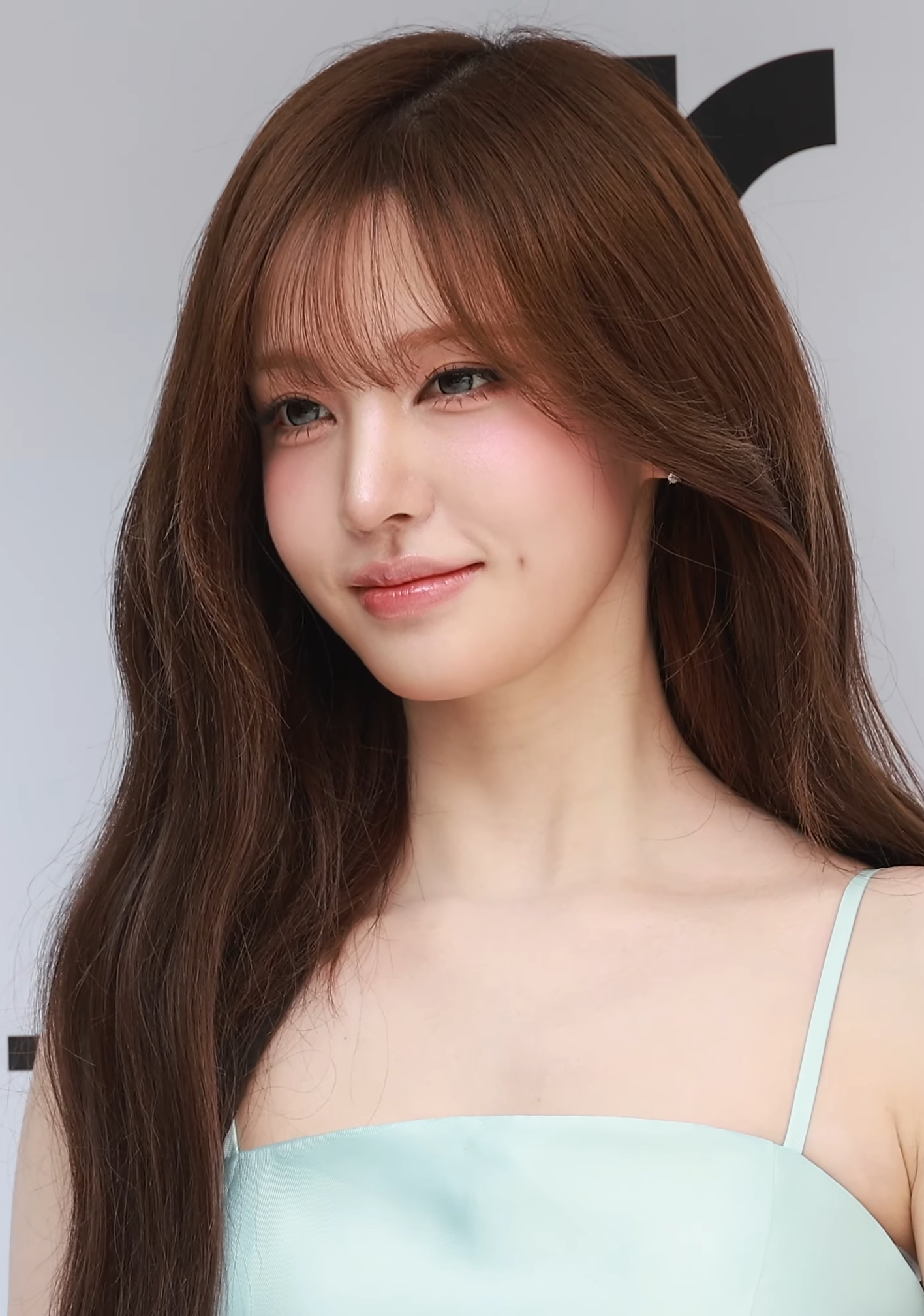
- Liz in July 2026
- Born: Kim Ji-won; November 21, 2004 (age 21); Jeju Province, South Korea
- Occupation: Singer
- Musical career
- Genre: K-pop
- Instrument: Vocals
- Years active: 2021–present
- Label: Starship
- Member of: Ive

Korean name
- Hangul: 김지원
- RR: Gim Jiwon
- MR: Kim Chiwŏn

Kim Ji-won (Korean: 김지원; born November 21, 2004), known professionally as Liz (리즈), is a South Korean singer under Starship Entertainment. She is a member of the South Korean girl group Ive.

== Early life ==
Liz was born on November 21, 2004, in Jeju Province, South Korea.

== Career ==
=== 2021–present: Debut with Ive, solo activities ===
Liz was revealed as a vocalist of Ive on November 5, 2021, the fourth member to be revealed. Liz officially debuted as a member of Ive on December 1, 2021, with group's single album titled Eleven, which topped all South Korean charts upon debut. Later on, they won both the Rookie of the Year award and the Song of the Year Daesang (grand prize) award. On December 15, 2024, she released a song titled "Summer", the seventh track of Love Your Enemy OST. On February 22, 2025, Liz and fellow Ive member Gaeul were selected as special MCs on the MBC show Show! Music Core. On May 18, 2025, she released the song "Heavy Love" for the soundtrack of Heavenly Ever After. On September 27, 2025, Liz appeared on the MBC variety show Hangout with Yoo for a special "80s Seoul Music Festival" episode. She performed a remake of Lee Ji-yeon's "Stop the Wind", earning positive responses for her vocal tone, retro-themed styling, and faithful delivery of the song. Her performance was praised by the program's MCs and judges, and the official audio version was later released through major music platforms.

== Other ventures ==
=== Endorsements ===
Liz has held several endorsement roles in fashion and beauty. In 2022, she was selected as a campaign model for Olive Young's vegan beauty campaign. In May 2023, she was named the campaign model for Kakao Style's Zigzag. In 2025, Liz was selected as the model for the Korean clothing brand 8seconds in September, announced as the muse of nature beauty brand S.Nature in October. In January 2026, she became an ambassador for the Italian fashion house Valentino. In February 2026, she was appointed as the ambassador for the Spring/Summer 2026 season of the South Korean fashion brand Matin Kim, and as the new global model for the beauty brand Tony Moly.

== Discography ==
=== Singles ===
List of singles, with selected chart positions, showing year released and album name
Title	Year	Peak chart positions	Album
Title	Year	KOR DL	Album
"Nobody" (with Winter and Soyeon)	2023	11	Non-album single

=== Other charted songs ===
List of other charted songs, with selected chart positions, showing year released and album name
Title	Year	Peak chart positions	Album
Title	Year	KOR DL	Album
"Unreal" (Note: credited to Ive, but the track is a solo by Liz)	2026	22	Revive+

=== Soundtrack appearances ===
List of soundtrack appearances, with selected chart positions, with selected chart positions, showing year released and album name
Title	Year	Peak chart positions	Album
Title	Year	KOR DL	Album
"Summer"	2024	—	Love Your Enemy OST Part 7
"Heavy Love"	2025	74	Heavenly Ever After OST Part 5
"Princess Catch! Teenieping" (프린세스 캐치! 티니핑 주제곡)	2025	49	Princess Catch! Teenieping OST
"빙글빙글"	2025	—	'80s MBC Seoul Gayoje Preliminary Round
"바람아 멈추어다오"	2025	—	'80s MBC Seoul Gayoje Final Round
"First Snow, That Day" (첫 눈 그날처럼)	2026	86	Sold Out on You OST Part 1
"Tunnel" (터널)	2026	31	Spooky in Love OST Part 1
"—" denotes releases that did not chart or were not released in that region.

=== Composition credits ===
All song credits are adapted from the Korea Music Copyright Association's database unless stated otherwise.

List of songs, showing year released, artist name, and name of the album
Title	Year	Artist	Album	Lyricist	Composer
"Thank U"	2025	Ive	Ive Empathy	Yes	No
"Midnight Kiss"	2025	Ive	Ive Secret	Yes	No
"Unreal" (Note: Originally performed by Liz at Ive's Show What I Am World Tour.)	2026	Herself	Revive+	Yes	No
"Crumbs"	2026	Ive	Looks Can Kill	Yes	No

== Videography ==
=== Music videos ===
Title	Year	Director(s)	Length	Ref.
"Nobody" (with Winter and Soyeon)	2023	Zanybros	2:48	

=== Soundtrack music videos ===
Title	Year	Director(s)	Length	Ref.
"Summer"	2024	Unknown	3:56	
"Heavy Love"	2025	Unknown	4:08	

=== Music video appearances ===
Title	Artist	Year	Director(s)	Length	Ref.
"This Christmas"	Taeyeon	2017	Unknown	4:43	

== Filmography ==
=== Hosting ===
Year	Title	Notes	Ref.
2026	Korea Grand Music Awards	with Kim Jae-won	
2025	Show! Music Core	with Gaeul	

== Awards and nominations ==
List of awards and nominations
Award ceremony	Year	Category	Work	Result	Ref.
Korea Grand Music Awards	2026	Best OST	"Princess Catch! Teenieping OST"	Won	
MBC Entertainment Awards	2025	Rookie of the Year Award – Female	Hangout with Yoo	Nominated	
