= Eleven (single album) =

2021 single album by Ive

- Digital cover

Single album by Ive
- Released: December 1, 2021
- Genre: K-pop
- Length: 6:23
- Languages: Korean; English
- Labels: Starship; Kakao

Ive chronology
Eleven (2021)	Love Dive (2022)

Singles from Eleven
- 1. "Eleven" Released: December 1, 2021

Eleven is the debut single album of the South Korean girl group Ive. It was released on December 1, 2021, by Starship Entertainment and distributed by Kakao Entertainment. It contains two tracks, including the lead single of the same name.

The album debuted at number one on the weekly Gaon Album Chart and at number three on the monthly chart for December, selling 268,396 copies in its first month of release. It has since been certified double platinum by the Korea Music Content Association (KMCA) for surpassing 500,000 units.

== Background and release ==
On December 1, the group released their debut single album, Eleven, led by the single of the same name. The song is an energetic and rhythmical dance pop filled with diverse accompanying variations that expresses the love of a girl, having their hearts filled with fantasy and colours. The group made their broadcast debut on KBS2's Music Bank on December 3 to perform "Eleven".

== Commercial performance ==
The single album debuted at number three on the South Korean Gaon Album Chart for the week ending December 4, 2021. The album dropped to number four the following week and stayed at the position for two consecutive weeks. The following week the album jumped three spots to number one becoming the group's first chart topping album in their home country. The album sold 268,396 copies in December, debuting at number 3 on the monthly albums chart. With less than a month of tracking the album became the 49th best selling album in the country and the tenth best selling album by a female artist or group in the country in 2021.

== Critical reception ==
Professional ratings
Review scores
Source	Rating
IZM	3/5 stars

In a mixed review from IZM, writer Jung Soo-min wrote that the "oriental sound" and "repeated percussion" empathized the unique voices of all the members. Jung also added that there was one killing point in particular that stood out in the pre-chorus when the song slows down, commenting that the vocals were captivating and drew the listener in to focus. Although Jung praised Ive for trying to differentiate themselves from other competitors, they pointed out that there was a lack of strong individuality from the group's concept in comparison to other new girl groups. However, Jung noted that developing a group's identity takes time, and praised the single album, saying that overall "[this] is a debut single that exceeds expectations".

== Track listing ==
Eleven track listing
No.	Title	Lyrics	Music	Arrangement	Length
1.	"Eleven"	Seo Ji-eum	Peter Rycroft; Lauren Aquilina; Ryan S. Jhun	Lostboy; Ryan S. Jhun; Alawn	2:58
2.	"Take It"	Lee Seu-ran	Daniel Kim; Jeremy G; Willie	Willie	3:25

== Charts ==
=== Weekly charts ===
Weekly chart performance
Chart (2021)	Peak position
South Korean Albums (Gaon)	1

=== Monthly charts ===
Monthly chart performance
Chart (2021)	Peak position
South Korean Albums (Gaon)	3

=== Year-end charts ===
Year-end chart performance
Chart	Position
Japanese Albums (Oricon) Japanese ver.	57
South Korean Albums (Gaon)	49

Year-end chart performance
Chart	Peak position
South Korea Albums (Circle)	83

== Certifications and sales ==
Certifications and sales
Region	Certification	Certified units/sales
South Korea (KMCA)	2× Platinum	524,100

== Release history ==
Release history and formats for Eleven
Region	Date	Format	Label
South Korea	December 1, 2021	CD; digital download; streaming	Starship; Kakao
Various	December 1, 2021	Digital download; streaming	Starship; Kakao
