= 2025 MAMA Awards =

27th edition of the MAMA Awards held in 2025

- Date: November 28–29, 2025
- Venue: Kai Tak Stadium, Hong Kong
- Presented by: Visa
- Hosted by: Park Bo-gum (Nov. 28); Kim Hye-soo (Nov. 29)

Highlights
- Most wins: Aespa; G-Dragon; Rosé (4)
- Website: 2025 MAMA Awards

Television/radio coverage
- Network: Mnet, TVING, and global broadcasting partners
- Runtime: 200 minutes

The 2025 MAMA Awards took place on November 28 and 29 at the Kai Tak Stadium in Hong Kong. Actor and singer Park Bo-gum hosted the first day of the show, while actress Kim Hye-soo hosted the second day. Due to the Wang Fuk Court fire, several performances were either cancelled or revised to a more subdued production. It was broadcast through Mnet, TVING, and live stream through HBO Max for the first time.

== Background ==
The ceremony is organized by CJ ENM through its music channel Mnet. The theme for the 27th edition of the show is "Hear My Roar: uh-heung," a Korean expression meaning fun or excitement.

=== Selection process ===
All songs and albums that are eligible to be nominated must be released from October 1, 2024, to September 30, 2025.

Criteria for 2024 MAMA Awards nominations
Category	Digital sales (Download + Streaming)	Record sales	Online voting	Judges panel evaluations
Artist of the Year	30% (20% Korea + 10% Global)	30%	N/A	40%
Categories by Artist (Note: Consists of Best New Male & Female Artist, Best Male & Female Artist, and Best Male & Female Group.)	30% (20% Korea + 10% Global)	30%	N/A	40%
Song of the Year	60% (40% Korea + 20% Global)	N/A		40%
Categories by Genre (Note: Consists of Best Dance Performance – Male & Female Solo & Group, Best Vocal Performance – Solo & Group, Best Rap & Hip Hop Music, Best Collaboration, and Best OST.)	60% (40% Korea + 20% Global)	N/A		40%
Album of the Year	N/A	60%	N/A	40%
Best Music Video & Best Choreography	N/A			100%
Special Awards	N/A			100%
Fans' Choice Categories	N/A		100% (90% Mnet Plus + 10% X/Twitter Votes)	N/A
Data Sources: Circle Chart (Domestic/Global Song Streaming/Downloads, Album Sales), X (SNS Voting Data)

Round 1 voting for Fans' Choice Male & Female started on October 16, 19:00 KST until October 26, 23:59 KST. Round 2 voting together with Fans' Choice of the Year is to be conducted from October 30, 18:00 KST until November 10, 23:59 KST. Voting for Fans' Choice of the Year reopened during the live broadcast on November 28.

== Performers ==
The first line-up of performers were announced on October 17. The second line-up were announced on October 20.

Izna, KickFlip, Hearts2Hearts, and TWS were scheduled to perform during the red carpet but it was cancelled due to the Wang Fuk Court fire. The Hong Kong boy group Mirror also announced their withdrawal from the awards due to the fire on November 27.

=== Chapter 1 (November 28) ===
Performances for Day 1
Artist(s)	Song(s) Performed	Theme
Bumsup; Park Bo-gum	"Ink Becoming Flash" (Dance performance)	The Time For Uh-heung
Hearts2Hearts; NCT Wish	Intro (Shindong) "Focus" (Hearts2Hearts) "Color" (MAMA version; NCT Wish)	Wish To Hearts
TWS; Meovv	"Overdrive" (Mad Water version; TWS); Intro: "Hands Up" + "Turn it Up" (Note: Original title is "Burning Up", sans the word "Burning".) (MAMA version; Meovv)	Flip The Coin
Alpha Drive One	Intro + "Formula"	First Act: Formula
Babymonster	"We Go Up" (MAMA version) "Drip" (MAMA version)	Monster's Night Live
BoyNextDoor	Intro: "123-78" (Sungho and Riwoo) / "Live in Paris" (Leehan solo) / "I Feel Good" (Jaehyun and Taesan) / "If I Say, I Love You" (Intro; Woonhak solo) "If I Say, I Love You" "Hollywood Action"	Mnet Movie Awards
Yeonjun	"Coma" "Talk to You"	Moves In The Depth
Treasure	"2025 Free" "Paradise" (Remix) "I Want Your Love" (Band version)	MAMA Palooza: Trazy Mode
I-dle	Intro + "Good Thing" (MAMA version)	Look At Me Now
Super Junior	Intro: "Superman" "Express Mode" "Mr. Simple" "Bonamana" "Sorry, Sorry"	Super Junior, Assemble
Ive	Intro + "XOXZ" "Rebel Heart"	RevIVE Me
Enhypen	Intro + "No Doubt" "Bad Desire (With or Without You)"	Crimson Broken

=== Chapter 2 (November 29) ===
Performances for Day 2
Artist(s)	Song(s) Performed	Theme
Kim Hye-soo; Felix; Kyoka; Sung Han-bin; AllDay Project	"Bad Boy" (Kyoka and Sung Han-bin) "Famous" (MAMA version; AllDay Project)	Hear My Roar
Idid; KickFlip	Intro "Push Back" (MAMA version; Idid) "My First Love Song" (MAMA version; KickFlip) "Boy In Luv" (KickFlip and Idid)	고백은 타이밍이라고들 하지만... 같은 타이밍에 이러는 건 아닌 거 같습니다 (They Say Confession Is All About Timing, But... I Don't Think It's The Same Timing)
Cortis	Intro + "Go!" "Fashion"	Made By Cortis
Ahn Hyo-seop; Ahyeon, Rora, Pharita (Babymonster)	"Jinu's Lament" (Ahn Hyo-seop solo) "What It Sounds Like" (Ahyeon, Rora, Pharita) "Golden" (Ahyeon, Rora, Pharita)	Together We're Glowin' (Note: In collaboration with KPop Demon Hunters.)
JO1	"Be Classic" "Handz in My Pocket" (MAMA version)	Fortissimo Jo.1
Izna	Intro + "Mamma Mia" (MAMA version)	Not Just Pretty: Awakening
Riize	Intro + "Bag Bad Back" (MAMA version) "Fame"	1000 Stormy Nights Behind The Fame
Zerobaseone	Intro + "Doctor! Doctor!" "Iconik"	追尋花影 (Chase The Bloom)
Tomorrow X Together	"Upside Down Kiss" "Beautiful Strangers"	The Last Stranger
Aespa	Intro + "Dirty Work" "Rich Man"	Mad Muses: Fury Of Steel
Stray Kids	"Anthem" (MAMA version) "Creed" "Chk Chk Boom" "Divine" "Ceremony" (Hip Hip version)	The K-Pop Champion
G-Dragon; Wing	Intro + "Drama" (G-Dragon solo); Beatbox performance (Wing solo) "Heartbreaker" (G-Dragon and Wing) "Untitled, 2025" (G-Dragon solo)	Endlich der Übermensch!

== Presenters ==
2025 MAMA Awards hosts

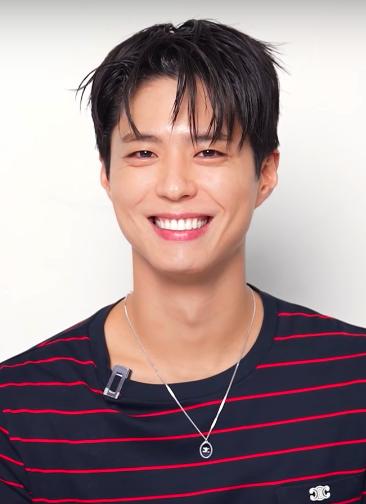
Park Bo-gum

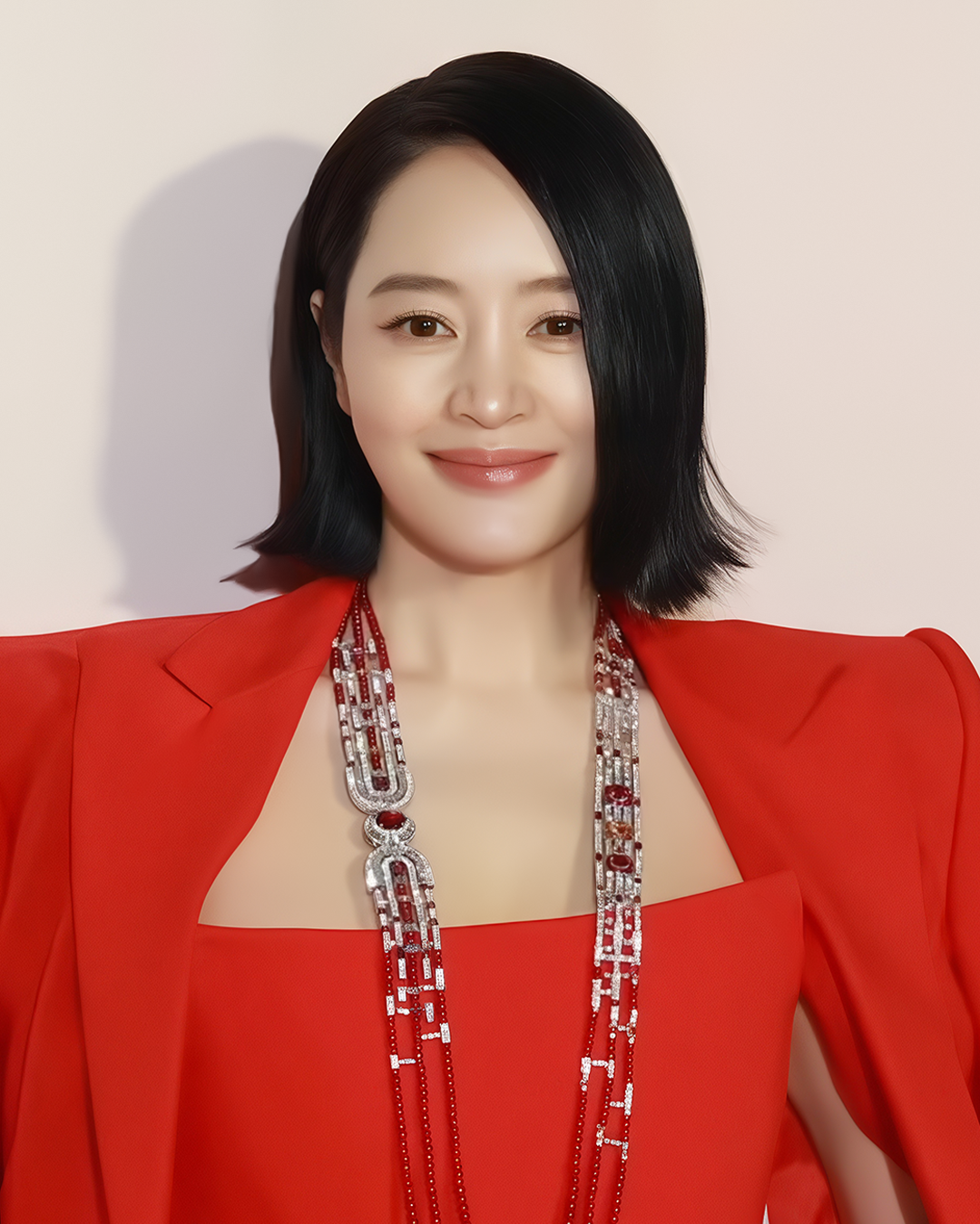
Kim Hye-soo

Park Bo-gum and Kim Hye-soo were announced as the hosts of the ceremony in late October. The line-up of presenters was announced on November 4. Michelle Yeoh was originally scheduled to appear as one of the presenters but didn't attend due to the Wang Fuk Court fire which occurred on 26 November, two days before the first day of the awards.

=== Chapter 1 (November 28) ===
- Park Bo-gum – Main ceremony host (November 28)
- Lee Jun-young – presented Fans' Choice Top 10
- Cho Han-gyeol and Roh Yoon-seo – presented Fans' Choice Top 10
- Lee Joon-hyuk – presented Favorite Global Performer and Fans' Choice Top 10
- Cho Sae-ho and Hyun Ji Shin – presented Telasa Favorite Global Artist and Favorite Female Group
- Ahn Eun-jin – presented Best New Artist
- Honey J and Leejung Lee – presented Fans' Choice Top 10
- Lee Joon-hyuk and Jang Do-yeon – presented Global Trend Song
- Jeon Yeo-been – presented Favorite Male Group
- Park Hyung-sik – presented Fans' Choice Top 10
- Choi Dae-hoon and Lee Jun-young – presented Fans' Choice Top 10
- Sion and Sung Han-bin – presented Inspiring Achievement
- Ju Ji-hoon – presented Song of the Year and Fans' Choice of the Year

=== Chapter 2 (November 29) ===
- Kim Hye-soo – Main ceremony host (November 29)
- Yim Si-wan and Jo Yuri – presented Best Dance Performance Male Solo
- Noh Sang-hyun – presented Favorite Rising Artist
- Lee Kwang-soo and Shin Ye-eun – presented Best Choreography
- Go Youn-jung – presented Visa Super Stage Artist
- Lee Hye-ri – Introduction to CJ Group & UNESCO girls' education in developing countries campaign
- Lee Soo-hyuk – presented Best Male Artist and Best Dance Performance Female Group
- Yim Si-wan – presented Olive Young K-Beauty Artist
- Kim Hye-soo – presented Music Visionary of the Year
- Cha Joo-young – presented Favorite Asian Artist and Breakthrough Artist
- Ahn Hyo-seop and Arden Cho – presented Worldwide KCONers' Choice and Best OST
- Lee Do-hyun and Lee Hye-ri – presented Best Female Group
- Shin Seung-hun – presented Album of the Year
- Chow Yun-fat – presented Artist of the Year

== Winner and nominees ==
The list of nominees was announced via livestream on October 16, 2025, and voting for Fans' Choice started shortly after. Nominees are listed in alphanumerical order. Winners are listed first and highlighted in bold.

=== Grand prize ===
Artist of the Year (Daesang)	Song of the Year (Daesang)
**G-Dragon**; Aespa; Jennie; Rosé; Seventeen; List of longlisted nominees: AHOF; AllDay Project; Babymonster; Baby Dont Cry; Baekhyun; BoyNextDoor; Close Your Eyes; Cortis; Enhypen; Hearts2Hearts; I-dle; Idid; Ive; Izna; J-Hope; Jin; Jisoo; KickFlip; KiiiKiii; Le Sserafim; Mark; Riize; Stray Kids; Taeyeon; Tomorrow X Together; Twice; Yuqi; Zerobaseone	**Rosé and Bruno Mars – "APT."**; Aespa – "Whiplash"; G-Dragon – "Too Bad" (feat. Anderson .Paak); Huntrix – "Golden"; Jennie – "Like Jennie"; List of longlisted nominees: Aespa – "Dirty Work"; AllDay Project – "Famous"; AllDay Project – "Wicked"; Babymonster – "Drip"; Big Naughty – "Music" (feat. Lee Chan-hyuk); Blackpink – "Jump"; BoyNextDoor – "If I Say, I Love You"; BoyNextDoor – "Never Loved this Way Before"; CNBLUE – "A Sleepless Night"; Cortis – "Go! "; Davichi – "Stitching"; Day6 – "Maybe Tomorrow"; Dayoung – "Body"; Doyoung – "Memory"; Dynamic Duo and Gummy – "Take Care"; Haon – "Skrr" (feat. Giselle); Highlight – "Endless Ending"; Illit – "Cherish (My Love)"; Ive – "Rebel Heart"; J-Hope – "Mona Lisa"; Jennie – "Zen"; Jennie and Doechii – "ExtraL"; Jisoo – "Earthquake"; Kai – "Wait on Me"; Karina – "Up"; Key – "Hunter"; Le Sserafim – "Hot"; Lee Chan-hyuk – "Vivid LaLa Love"; Lee Mu-jin – "Coming of Age Story"; Mark – "1999"; Mark – "Fraktsiya" (feat. Lee Young-ji); Meovv – "Drop Top"; Minnie – "Her"; N.Flying – "Everlasting"; NCT Dream – "When I'm With You"; NCT Wish – "Poppop"; Park Hyo-shin – "Hero"; PH-1 – "Life Is A Movie" (feat. Jung Ji-so); Plave – "Dash"; QWER – "Dear"; Riize – "Fly Up"; Rosé – "Toxic Till the End"; Roy Kim – "If You Ask Me What Love Is"; Saja Boys – "Soda Pop"; Seventeen – "Thunder"; Tablo and RM – "Stop the Rain"; Taeyeon – "Letter to Myself"; Tomorrow X Together – "When the Day Comes"; Treasure – "Yellow"; TWS – "Countdown!"; V and Park Hyo-shin – "Winter Ahead"; Xdinary Heroes – "Beautiful Life"; Zerobaseone – "Doctor! Doctor!"
Album of the Year (Daesang)	Fans' Choice of the Year (Daesang)
**Stray Kids – Karma**; Enhypen – Desire: Unleash; Riize – Odyssey; Seventeen – Spill the Feels; Tomorrow X Together – The Star Chapter: Together; List of longlisted nominees: Aespa – Whiplash; Ateez – Golden Hour: Part.2; Babymonster – Drip; Baekhyun – Essence of Reverie; BoyNextDoor – No Genre; G-Dragon – Übermensch; I-dle – We Are; Ive – Ive Empathy; Jin – Happy; NCT Dream – Dreamscape; NCT Wish – Color; Plave – Caligo Pt.1; Zerobaseone – Never Say Never	**Enhypen**; List of longlisted nominees: Aespa; AllDay Project; Ateez; Babymonster; Baekhyun; Blackpink; BoA; BoyNextDoor; Bibi; Cortis; G-Dragon; Got7; Hearts2Hearts; I-dle; Illit; Irene; Itzy; IU; Ive; Izna; J-Hope; Jin; Kai; Le Sserafim; NCT Dream; NCT Wish; Nmixx; Plave; Riize; Seventeen; Stray Kids; Tomorrow X Together; Treasure; Twice; TWS; Unis; Wendy; Yena; Zerobaseone

=== Main awards ===
Best Male Group	Best Female Group
**Seventeen**; Enhypen; Riize; Stray Kids; Tomorrow X Together; Zerobaseone	**Aespa**; Babymonster; I-dle; Ive; Le Sserafim; Twice
Best Male Artist	Best Female Artist
**G-Dragon**; Baekhyun; J-Hope; Jin; Mark	**Rosé**; Jennie; Jisoo; Taeyeon; Yuqi
Best Dance Performance – Male Group	Best Dance Performance – Female Group
**Seventeen** **– "Thunder"**; BoyNextDoor – "If I Say, I Love You"; NCT Dream – "When I'm With You"; NCT Wish – "Poppop"; Plave – "Dash"; Riize – "Fly Up"; TWS – "Countdown!"	**Aespa – "Whiplash"**; Babymonster – "Drip"; Blackpink – "Jump"; Illit – "Cherish (My Love)"; Ive – "Rebel Heart"; Le Sserafim – "Hot"
Best Dance Performance – Male Solo	Best Dance Performance – Female Solo
**G-Dragon – "Too Bad" (feat. Anderson .Paak)**; J-Hope – "Mona Lisa"; Kai – "Wait on Me"; Key – "Hunter"; Mark – "1999"	**Jennie – "Like Jennie"**; Dayoung – "Body"; Minnie – "Her"; Jisoo – "Earthquake"; Karina – "Up"
Best Vocal Performance – Solo	Best Vocal Performance – Group
**Rosé – "Toxic Till the End"**; Doyoung – "Memory"; Lee Mu-jin – "Coming of Age Story"; Roy Kim – "If You Ask Me What Love Is"; Taeyeon – "Letter to Myself"	**Davichi – "Stitching"**; Highlight – "Endless Ending"; Meovv – "Drop Top"; Treasure – "Yellow"; Zerobaseone – "Doctor! Doctor!"
Best Rap & Hip Hop Performance	Best Band Performance
**Big Naughty – "Music" (feat. Lee Chan-hyuk)**; Dynamic Duo and Gummy – "Take Care"; Haon – "Skrr" (feat. Giselle); PH-1 – "Life Is A Movie" (feat. Jung Ji-so); Tablo and RM – "Stop the Rain"	**Day6 – "Maybe Tomorrow"**; CNBLUE – "A Sleepless Night"; N.Flying – "Everlasting"; QWER – "Dear"; Xdinary Heroes – "Beautiful Life"
Best OST	Best Collaboration
**Huntrix – "Golden" (from KPop Demon Hunters)**; BoyNextDoor – "Never Loved this Way Before" (from Odd Girl Out); Park Hyo-shin – "Hero" (from The Firefighters); Saja Boys – "Soda Pop" (from KPop Demon Hunters); Tomorrow X Together – "When the Day Comes" (from Resident Playbook)	**Rosé and Bruno Mars – "APT."**; G-Dragon – "Too Bad" (feat. Anderson .Paak); Jennie and Doechii – "ExtraL"; Mark – "Fraktsiya" (feat. Lee Young-ji); V and Park Hyo-shin – "Winter Ahead"
Best Music Video	Best Choreography
**Jennie – "Zen"**; Aespa – "Dirty Work"; AllDay Project – "Famous"; Blackpink – "Jump"; Lee Chan-hyuk – "Vivid LaLa Love"	**Aespa – "Whiplash"**; AllDay Project – "Wicked"; Cortis – "Go!"; G-Dragon – "Too Bad" (feat. Anderson .Paak); Jennie – "Like Jennie"
Best New Artist
**Cortis**; **Hearts2Hearts**; AHOF; AllDay Project; Baby Dont Cry; Close Your Eyes; Idid; Izna; KickFlip; KiiiKiii

=== Popularity awards ===
Fans' Choice Top 10 – Female	Fans' Choice Top 10 – Male
**Irene**; **IU**; **Illit**; **Aespa**; **Babymonster**; **Hearts2Hearts**; **I-dle**; **Itzy**; **Le Sserafim**; **Twice**; List of nominees: AllDay Project; Apink; Artms; AtHeart; Baby Dont Cry; Billlie; Bibi; Blackpink; BoA; BOL4; Chung Ha; Chuu; Davichi; Fifty Fifty; Fromis 9; H1-Key; Hwasa; Hyolyn; Ive; Izna; Jeon Somi; Joy; Kard; Kep1er; KiiiKiii; Kiss of Life; Meovv; NiziU; Nmixx; Oh My Girl; QWER; Say My Name; Seulgi; STAYC; Taeyeon; TripleS; Unis; Viviz; Wendy; Yena	**Baekhyun**; **Seventeen**; **Jin**; **Enhypen**; **G-Dragon**; **J-Hope**; **NCT Dream**; **Riize**; **Stray Kids**; **Zerobaseone**; List of nominees: 10cm; 82Major; 8Turn; AB6IX; AHOF; Ampers&One; ARrC; Astro; Ateez; BoyNextDoor; BtoB; Close Your Eyes; CNBLUE; Cortis; Cravity; Daesung; Day6; D.O; Doyoung; Epik High; Evnne; Got7; Idid; Jay Park; Kai; KickFlip; Lee Mu-jin; N.Flying; NCT Wish; Nexz; P1Harmony; Plave; Shinee; Super Junior; TIOT; Tomorrow X Together; Treasure; TWS; WayV; Xdinary Heroes
Worldwide KCONer's Choice	Olive Young K-Beauty Artist
**Zerobaseone – "Blue"**; BoyNextDoor – "Nice Guy"; Cravity – "Now or Never"; HxW – "Bring It"; Izna – "Sign"; JO1 – "Be Classic"; NCT 127 – "Whiplash"; P1Harmony – "Duh"; Riize – "Bag Bad Back"; TWS – "Countdown!"	**Hearts2Hearts**; Babymonster; I-dle; Ive; Izna; Meovv
Visa Super Stage Artist
**Tomorrow X Together**; Aespa; BoyNextDoor; I-dle; Ive; Stray Kids

=== Special awards ===
Favorite Global Performer	Telasa Favorite Global Artist
**Ive**	**Enhypen**
Favorite Female Group	Global Trend Song
**Ive**	**Ive – "Rebel Heart"**
Favorite Male Group	Inspiring Achievement
**BoyNextDoor**	**Super Junior**
Favorite Rising Star	Music Visionary of the Year
**Izna**	**KPop Demon Hunters**
Favorite Asian Artist	Breakthrough Artist
**JO1**	**AllDay Project**

== Multiple awards ==
The following artist(s) received two or more awards:

Count	Artist(s)
4
4	Aespa
4	G-Dragon
4	Rosé
3	Enhypen
3	Hearts2Hearts
3	Ive
3	Seventeen
2	Bruno Mars
2	Jennie
2	Stray Kids
2	Zerobaseone

== Broadcast ==
Region	Network
Worldwide	YouTube (Mnet K-Pop, Mnet TV, M2, and KCON Official) (Note: YouTube Live Stream restricted in listed regions with a local broadcasting partner.) and Mnet Plus
South Korea	Mnet, tvN Show, TVING, Naver TV, & CHZZK
Japan	Mnet Japan, Mnet Smart+ & Telasa
Maldives	tvN Asia
Hong Kong	tvN Asia & HBO Max
Singapore	tvN Asia & HBO Max
Malaysia	tvN Asia & HBO Max
Indonesia	tvN Asia & HBO Max
Philippines	tvN Asia & HBO Max
Taiwan	tvN Asia & HBO Max
Myanmar	tvN Asia & HBO Max
Thailand	HBO Max
Brunei	HBO Max
Cambodia	HBO Max
Laos	HBO Max
Macao	HBO Max
Mongolia	HBO Max
Palau	HBO Max
Papua New Guinea	HBO Max
Solomon Islands	HBO Max
Timor Leste	HBO Max
United States	Samsung TV Plus (K-POP by CJ ENM)
Canada	Samsung TV Plus (K-POP by CJ ENM)
Brazil	Samsung TV Plus (K-POP by CJ ENM)
Mexico	Samsung TV Plus (K-POP by CJ ENM)
United Kingdom	Samsung TV Plus (K-POP by CJ ENM)
France	Samsung TV Plus (K-POP by CJ ENM)
Germany	Samsung TV Plus (K-POP by CJ ENM)
Italy	Samsung TV Plus (K-POP by CJ ENM)
Spain	Samsung TV Plus (K-POP by CJ ENM)
Sweden	Samsung TV Plus (K-POP by CJ ENM)
Netherlands	Samsung TV Plus (K-POP by CJ ENM)
Australia	Samsung TV Plus (K-POP by CJ ENM)
New Zealand	Samsung TV Plus (K-POP by CJ ENM)
Russia	IVI
Armenia	IVI
Azerbaijan	IVI
Belarus	IVI
Kazakhstan	IVI
Kyrgyzstan	IVI
Tajikistan	IVI
Turkmenistan	IVI
Moldova	IVI
Uzbekistan	IVI
Georgia	IVI
