= 40th Golden Disc Awards =

2026 South Korean music awards ceremony

- Official poster
- Date: January 10, 2026
- Location: Taipei Dome, Taipei, Taiwan
- Country: South Korea
- Hosted by: Sung Si-kyung; Moon Ga-young

Highlights
- Most awards: G-Dragon (3); Ive (3); Jennie (3)
- Digital Daesang: "Home Sweet Home"
- Album Daesang: Karma
- Artist Daesang: Jennie
- Website: goldendisc.co.kr

Television/radio coverage
- Network: JTBC

The 40th Golden Disc Awards (Korean: 제40회 골든디스크어워즈) is an award ceremony held on January 10, 2026, at the Taipei Dome in Taipei, Taiwan. It honored the best in South Korean music released between early-November 2024 and early-November 2025. The event was hosted by Sung Si-kyung and Moon Ga-young.

== Criteria ==
For the 40th ceremony, a new grand prize category, Artist of the Year, was introduced.

Category	Online voting	Expert Evaluation	Sales
Artist Daesang (Artist of the Year)	N/A	40%	60% (15% streaming usage + 15% album sales + 30% global chart)
Digital Daesang (Song of the Year)	N/A	40%	60% (streaming usage)
Digital Song (Bonsang)	N/A	40%	60% (streaming usage)
Album Daesang (Album of the Year)	N/A	40%	60% (album sales)
Album (Bonsang)	N/A	40%	60% (album sales)
Rookie Artist of the Year (Note: Applies to all digital singles, extended plays/single albums with 6 or less songs, and studio albums.)	N/A	40%	60% (30% streaming usage + 30% album sales)
Most Popular Artist	100%	N/A	
Special Awards	N/A	100%	N/A
Data Sources: Circle Chart (Digital chart, Album chart); Prizm (Voting data)

== Performers ==
The first line-up of performers was announced on November 26. The second line-up was announced on November 27.

Artist(s)	Song(s) Performed
Zhang Hao & Sung Han-bin	"Better" (BoA cover)
Cortis	"What You Want"
AllDay Project	"Famous" "Look at Me" "One More Time"
KiiiKiii	"Groundwork" "I Do Me" (Golden Disc version)
TWS	"Spring Day" (BTS Cover)
Izna	"Be My Baby" (Wonder Girls Cover)
Zo Zazz	"Don't You Know"
NCT Wish	"Videohood" "Color"
ARrC	"Dummy" "Awesome"
Close Your Eyes	"Close Your Eyes" "X" "SOB"
Kim Tae-rae	"Reflection of You in Your Smile" (Shin Seung-hun Cover)
Huh Yunjin	"Like Rain, Like Music" (Kim Hyun-sik Cover)
Izna	"Mamma mia" "Fake It"
TWS	"Countdown" "Nice to See You Again" (Korean version) "Overdrive"
BoyNextDoor	"If I Say, I Love You" "Hollywood Action"
Zerobaseone	"In Bloom" "Crush" "Feel the Pop" "Good So Bad" "Blue" "Iconik"
KiiiKiii	"Flying, Deep in the Night" (Lee Moon-sae Cover)
Jongho	"Those Days" (Kim Kwang-seok Cover)
Le Sserafim	"Spaghetti" "Hot"
Ive	"♥ Beats" "Rebel Heart"
Close Your Eyes	"Lies" (BigBang Cover)
ARrC	"Hot" (1TYM Cover)
Joohoney	"Sting"
Monsta X	"N the Front" "Do What I Want"
Enhypen	"Bad Desire (With or Without You)" "Daydream" "Outside"
Ateez	"Ice on My Teeth" "In Your Fantasy"
Stray Kids	"Divine" "Do It" (Turbo version) "Ceremony" (Karma version)
Jennie	"Filter" "Damn Right" "Like Jennie" (Remix version)

== Winners and nominees ==
Winners and nominees are listed in alphabetical order. Winners are listed first and emphasized in bold.

=== Main awards ===
Nominations for Digital Song Bonsang, Album Bonsang, and Rookie of the Year were announced on November 25, 2025.

Digital Daesang (Song of the Year)	Album Daesang (Album of the Year)
**G-Dragon – "Home Sweet Home" (featuring Taeyang and Daesung)**; Aespa – "Dirty Work"; AllDay Project – "Famous"; Blackpink – "Jump"; BoyNextDoor – "If I Say, I Love You"; Ive – "Rebel Heart"; Jennie – "Like Jennie"; Le Sserafim – "Hot"; Rosé – "Toxic Till the End"; Zo Zazz – "Don't You Know"	**Stray Kids – Karma**; Ateez – Golden Hour: Part.2; Enhypen – Desire: Unleash; G-Dragon – Übermensch; Ive – Ive Empathy; NCT Wish – Color; Riize – Odyssey; Seventeen – Happy Burstday; Tomorrow X Together – The Star Chapter: Together; Zerobaseone – Never Say Never
Artist Daesang (Artist of the Year)	Rookie Artist of the Year
**Jennie**	**AllDay Project**; **Cortis**; AHOF; Close Your Eyes; Hearts2Hearts; Idid; Idntt; Izna; KickFlip; KiiiKiii; Nouera; Zo Zazz
Digital Song Bonsang	Album Bonsang
**Aespa – "Dirty Work"**; **AllDay Project – "Famous"**; **Blackpink – "Jump"**; **BoyNextDoor – "If I Say, I Love You"**; **G-Dragon – "Home Sweet Home" (featuring Taeyang and Daesung)**; **Ive – "Rebel Heart"**; **Jennie – "Like Jennie"**; **Le Sserafim – "Hot"**; **Rosé – "Toxic Till the End"**; **Zo Zazz – "Don't You Know"**; Hearts2Hearts – "The Chase"; Hwang Ka-ram – "I Miss You So Much"; IU – "Never Ending Story"; KiiiKiii – "I Do Me"; Maktub – "Starting with You"; Meovv – "Hands Up"; Ovan – "Flower"; Plave – "Dash"; Seventeen – "Thunder"; Woody – "Sadder Than Yesterday"	**Ateez – Golden Hour: Part.2**; **Enhypen – Desire: Unleash**; **G-Dragon – Übermensch**; **Ive – Ive Empathy**; **NCT Wish – Color**; **Riize – Odyssey**; **Seventeen – Happy Burstday**; **Stray Kids – Karma**; **Tomorrow X Together – The Star Chapter: Together**; **Zerobaseone – Never Say Never**; &Team – Back to Life; Aespa – Rich Man; Baekhyun – Essence of Reverie; CxM – Hype Vibes; I-dle – We Are; Jennie – Ruby; Jin – Happy; NCT Dream – Dreamscape; The Boyz – Unexpected; Twice – Strategy

=== Popularity awards ===
The categories for the popularity awards were announced on December 22, and voting began on the same day, running until January 5. Voting is being conducted through Prizm.

Most Popular Artist – Female	Most Popular Artist – Male
**Hearts2Hearts**; Aespa; AllDay Project; Blackpink; I-dle; IU; Ive; Izna; Jennie; KiiiKiii; Le Sserafim; Meovv; Rosé; Twice	**Jin**; &Team; AHOF; Ateez; Baekhyun; BoyNextDoor; Close Your Eyes; Cortis; CxM; Enhypen; G-Dragon; Hwang Ka-ram; Idid; Idntt; KickFlip; Maktub; NCT Dream; NCT Wish; Nouera; Ovan; Plave; Riize; Seventeen; Stray Kids; The Boyz; Tomorrow X Together; Woody; Zerobaseone; Zo Zazz

=== Special awards ===
List of winners for the special awards
Golden Choice	Next Generation
**ARrC**; **Close Your Eyes**	**KiiiKiii**
Cosmopolitan Artist Award	Global Impact Award
**Ive**	**Jennie**
Best Performance	Naver AI Choice
**Izna**; **TWS**	**BoyNextDoor**
Best Group
**Monsta X**

== Multiple awards ==
The following artist(s) received two or more awards:

Count	Artist(s)
3	G-Dragon
3	Ive
3	Jennie
2	AllDay Project
2	BoyNextDoor
2	Stray Kids

== Gallery ==
Award ceremony gallery

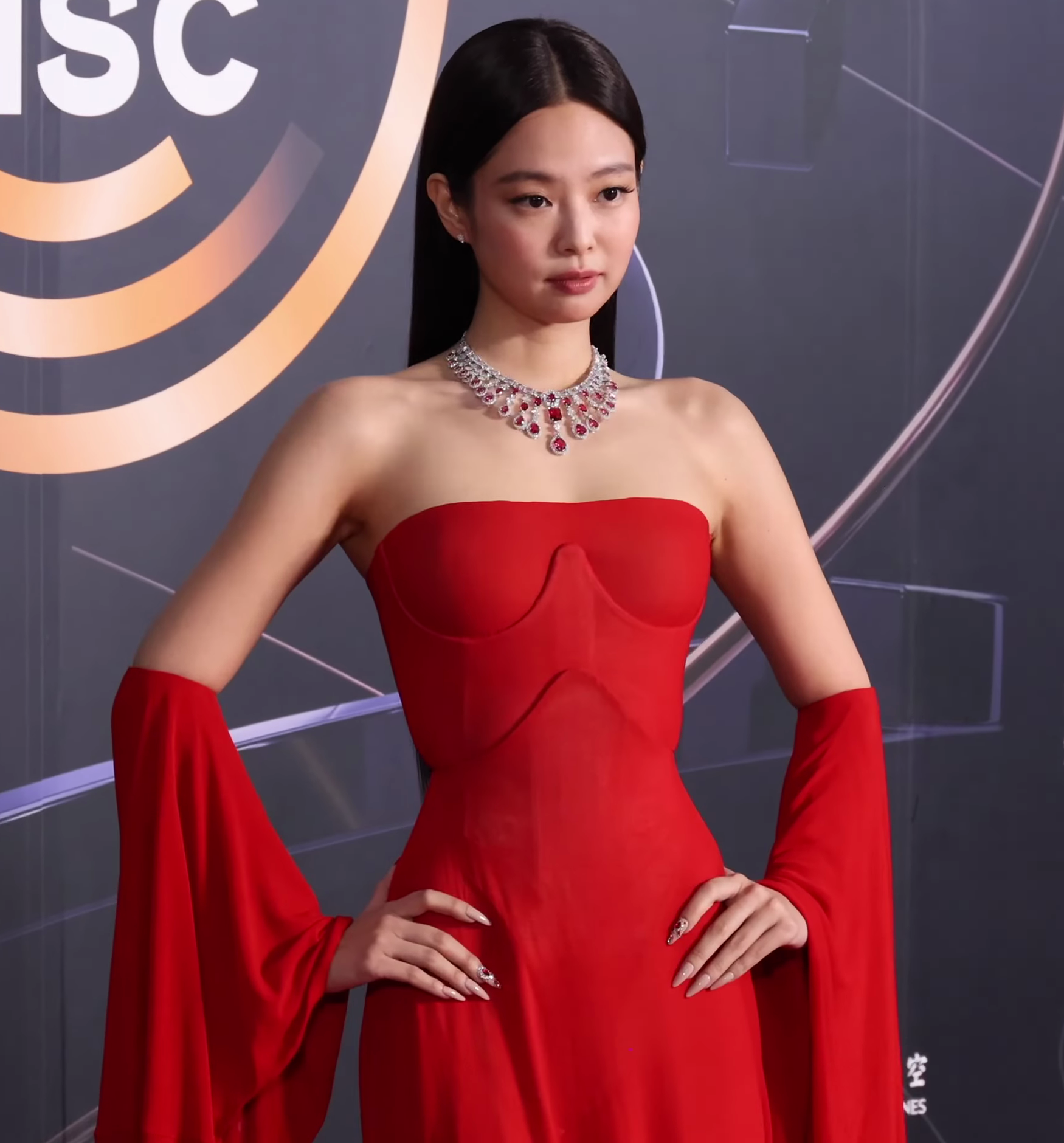
Jennie

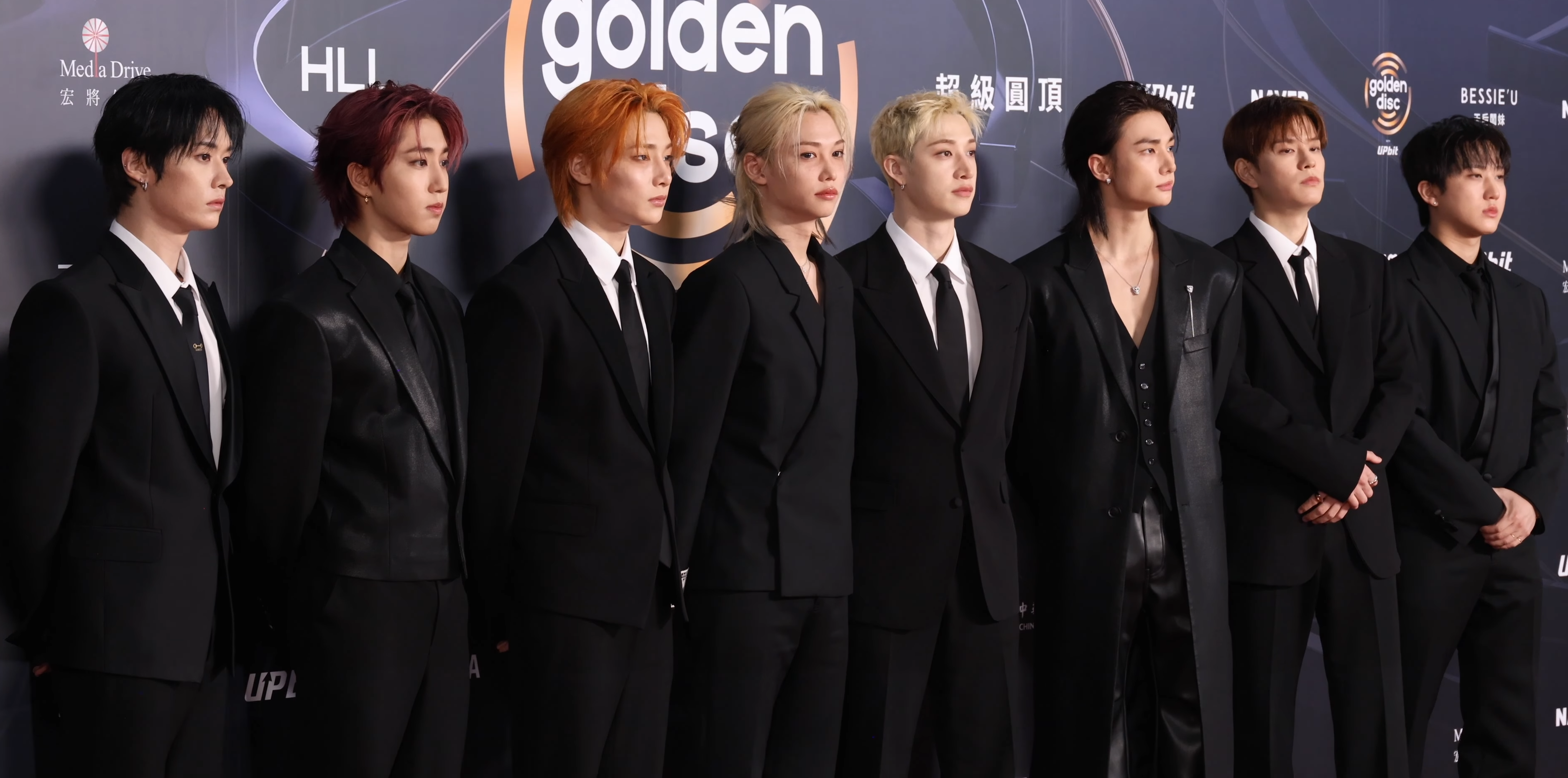
Stray Kids

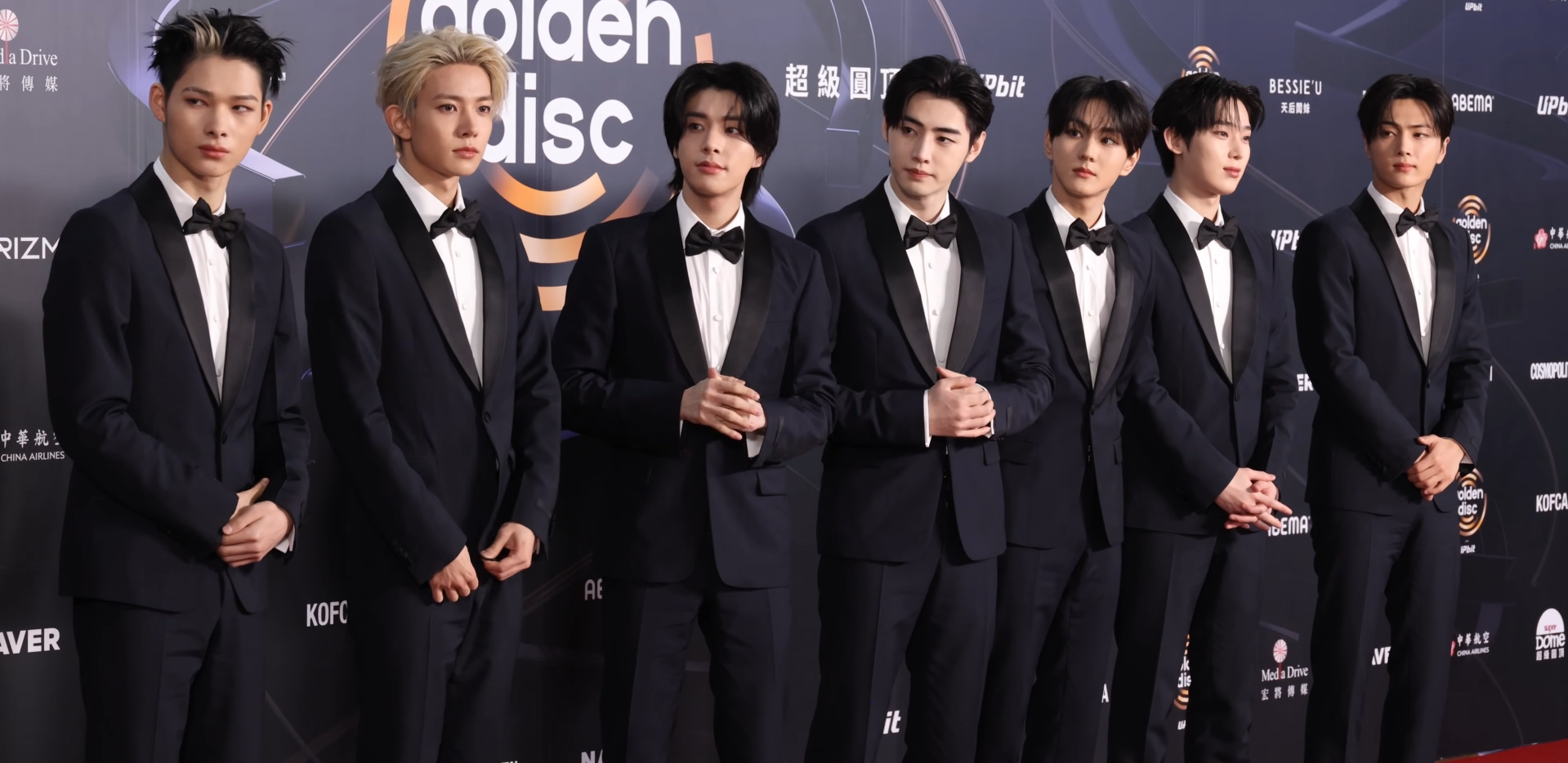
Enhypen

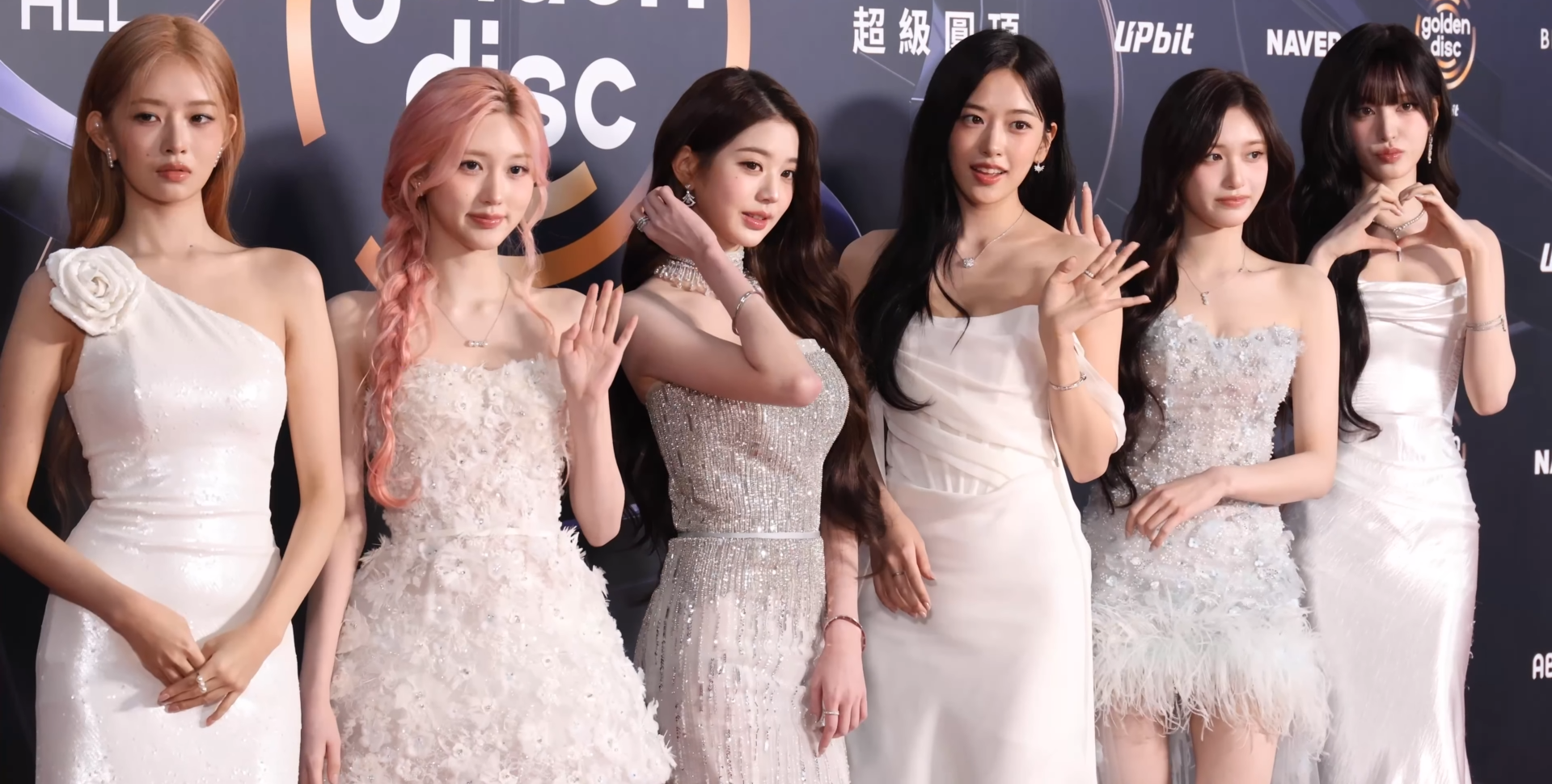
Ive

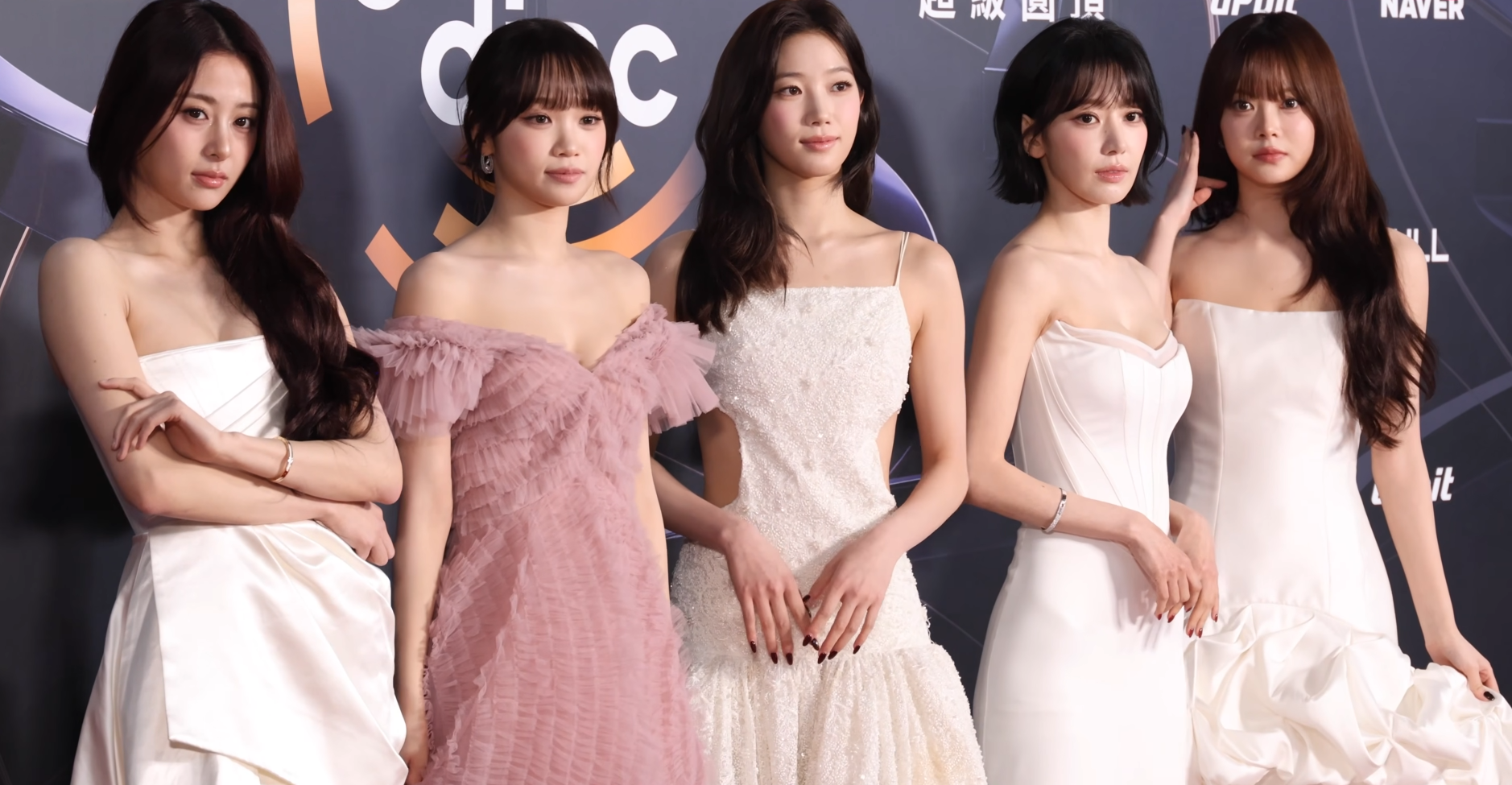
Le Sserafim
