= List of Music Bank Chart winners (2025) =

Music Bank Chart winners (2025)

The Music Bank Chart is a record chart established in 1998 on the South Korean KBS television music program Music Bank. Every week during its live broadcast, the show gives an award for the best-performing single on the South Korean chart. The chart utilizes digital performances on domestic online music services (60%), number of times the single was broadcast on KBS TV, radio and digital channels (20%), global pre-vote derived from Mubeat app (10%), album sales (5%), and social media score calculated using YouTube and TikTok data gathered from the Circle chart (5%) in its ranking methodology. The score for domestic online music services is calculated using data from Melon, Bugs, Genie Music, Naver VIBE and Flo. The show has been hosted by Park Min-ju and Moon Sang-min since October 2024.

== Chart history ==
Key
	Highest score of the year
—	No show was held

Episode	Date	Artist	Song	Points	Ref.
—N/a	January 3	Rosé and Bruno Mars	"APT."	4,087	
1,233	January 10	N.SSign	"Love Potion"	7,525	
1,234	January 17	BSS	"CBZ (Prime Time)"	10,191	
1,235	January 24	Ive	"Rebel Heart"	4,356	
—N/a	January 31	Minnie	"Her"	7,505	
1,236	February 7	Eunhyuk	"Up N Down"	7,917	
1,237	February 14	Ive	"Rebel Heart"	11,520	
1,238	February 21	Evnne	"Hot Mess"	8,166	
1,239	February 28	ONF	"The Stranger"	7,680	
1,240	March 7	Zerobaseone	"Blue"	10,235	
1,241	March 14	G-Dragon	"Too Bad"	6,271	
1,242	March 21	Le Sserafim	"Hot"	9,917	
1,243	March 28 (Note: This episode was originally scheduled to air on March 28 but was postponed to April 4 due to news coverage of the March 2025 South Korea wildfires.)	Nmixx	"Know About Me"	11,040	
—N/a	April 4	Ten	"Stunner"	7,752	
1,244	April 11	Close Your Eyes	"All My Poetry"	5,507	
1,245	April 18	Mark	"1999"	9,606	
1,246	April 25	NCT Wish	"Poppop"	14,627	
1,247	May 2	TWS	"Countdown"	12,817	
1,248	May 9	Highlight	"Chains"	7,879	
1,249	May 16	P1Harmony	"Duh! "	9,716	
1,250	May 23	BoyNextDoor	"I Feel Good"	9,353	
1,251	May 30	Riize	"Fly Up"	10,452	
—N/a	June 6	Seventeen	"Thunder"	12,971	
1,252	June 13	Enhypen	"Bad Desire (With or Without You)"	15,416	
1,253	June 20	Doyoung	"Memory"	7,063	
1,254	June 27	Illit	"Do the Dance"	11,932	
1,255	July 4	Fromis 9	"Like You Better"	6,903	
1,256	July 11	AHOF	"Rendezvous"	7,941	
1,257	July 18	Close Your Eyes	"Snowy Summer"	5,394	
1,258	July 25	NCT Dream	"BTTF"	9,732	
1,259	August 1	Tomorrow X Together	"Beautiful Strangers"	12,368	
1,260	August 8	The Boyz	"Stylish"	7,536	
—N/a	August 15	Evnne	"How Can I Do"	9,335	
1,261	August 22	Key	"Hunter"	5,718	
1,262	August 29	Stray Kids	"Ceremony"	14,067	
1,263	September 5	Ive	"XOXZ"	12,342	
1,264	September 12	Zerobaseone	"Iconik"	8,202	
1,265	September 19	Haechan	"Crzy"	6,808	
1,266	September 26	Idid	"Chan-Ran"	8,096	
—N/a	October 3	KickFlip	"My First Love Song"	9,856	
—N/a	October 10	CxM	"5, 4, 3 (Pretty Woman)"	7,014	
1,267	October 17	Izna	"Mamma Mia"	4,483	
1,268	October 24	Nmixx	"Blue Valentine"	11,908	
1,269	October 31	BoyNextDoor	"Hollywood Action"	10,012	
1,270	November 7	&Team	"Back to Life"	11,211	
1,271	November 14	AHOF	"Pinocchio"	8,538	
1,272	November 21	Itzy	"Tunnel Vision"	8,019	
1,273	November 28	NCT Dream	"Beat It Up"	9,147	
1,274	December 5	Illit	"Not Cute Anymore"	7,593	
—N/a	December 12	Verivery	"Red (Beggin')"	6,238	
—N/a	December 19	AllDay Project	"One More Time"	5,804	
—N/a	December 26	Fromis 9	"White Memories"	4,875	

== See also ==
- List of Inkigayo Chart winners (2025)
- List of M Countdown Chart winners (2025)
- List of Show Champion Chart winners (2025)
- List of Show! Music Core Chart winners (2025)
- List of The Show Chart winners (2025)
