= List of Show Champion Chart winners (2025) =

Show Champion Chart winners (2025)

The Show Champion Chart is a record chart on the South Korean MBC M television music program Show Champion. Every week, the show awards the best performing single on the chart in the country during its live broadcast. The show has been hosted by Nam Seong-mo of 82Major, Jeon Min-wook and Jang Yeo-jun of Close Your Eyes since May 2025.

== Chart history ==
Key
	Indicates a Triple Crown
	Highest score of the year
—	No show was held

Episode	Date	Artist	Song	Points	Ref.
—N/a	January 1	No Broadcast or Winner			
—N/a	January 8	No Broadcast or Winner			
—N/a	January 15	No Broadcast or Winner			
—N/a	January 22	No Broadcast or Winner			
—N/a	January 29	No Broadcast or Winner			
—N/a	February 5	No Broadcast or Winner			
543	February 12	Plave	"Dash"	6,852	
—N/a	February 19	No Broadcast or Winner			
544	February 26	ONF	"The Stranger"	6,519	
545	March 5	Zerobaseone	"Blue"	6,917	
546	March 12	G-Dragon	"Too Bad"	4,892	
547	March 19	Treasure	"Yellow"	4,259	
548	March 26	Nmixx	"Know About Me"	6,865	
549	April 2	Jennie	"Like Jennie"	4,543	
550	April 9	NiziU	"Love Line"	4,823	
551	April 16	Mark	"1999"	5,592	
552	April 23	Unis	"Swicy"	6,467	
553	April 30	TWS	"Countdown"	9,394	
—N/a	May 7	No Broadcast or Winner			
554	May 14	P1Harmony	"Duh! "	6,500	
555	May 21	TripleS	"Are You Alive"	5,758	
556	May 28	Riize	"Fly Up"	7,719	
557	June 4	Seventeen	"Thunder"	8,000	
558	June 11	Seventeen	"Thunder"	5,742	
559	June 18	Doyoung	"Memory"	5,666	
560	June 25	Kang Daniel	"Episode"	6,792	
561	July 2	Cravity	"Set Net Go?! "	5,186	
562	July 9	AHOF	"Rendezvous"	6,831	
563	July 16	Close Your Eyes	"Snowy Summer"	4,478	
564	July 23	Blackpink	"Jump"	4,652	
565	July 30	Tomorrow X Together	"Beautiful Strangers"	5,072	
—N/a	August 6	No Broadcast or Winner			
—N/a	August 13	No Broadcast or Winner			
566	August 20	Key	"Hunter"	5,649	
—N/a	August 27	No Broadcast or Winner			
567	September 3	Stray Kids	"Ceremony"	7,313	
568	September 10	Zerobaseone	"Iconik"	7,456	
569	September 17	Aespa	"Rich Man"	5,050	
570	September 24	Yuqi	"M.O."	4,485	
571	October 1	KickFlip	"My First Love Song"	6,880	
572	October 8	Special episode, winner not announced			
573	October 15	Onewe	"Maze"	5,611	
574	October 22	Nmixx	"Blue Valentine"	8,614	
575	October 29	BoyNextDoor	"Hollywood Action"	5,713	
576	November 5	&Team	"Back to Life"	6,811	
577	November 12	AHOF	"Pinocchio"	6,578	
578	November 19	Close Your Eyes	"X"	5,919	
579	November 26	Stray Kids	"Do It"	6,637	
580	December 3	Stray Kids	"Do It"	7,416	
581	December 10	Taeyeon	"Panorama"	5,586	
582	December 17	Illit	"Not Cute Anymore"	5,647	
—N/a	December 24	No Broadcast or Winner			
—N/a	December 31	No Broadcast or Winner			

== See also ==
- List of Inkigayo Chart winners (2025)
- List of M Countdown Chart winners (2025)
- List of Music Bank Chart winners (2025)
- List of Show! Music Core Chart winners (2025)
- List of The Show Chart winners (2025)
