= Jump (Blackpink song) =

Single by Blackpink

from the EP Deadline
- Language: English; Korean
- Released: July 11, 2025
- Recorded: May–June 2025
- Studio: The Black Label (Seoul)
- Genre: Dance-pop; hardstyle
- Length: 2:44
- Label: YG
- Songwriters: Teddy; Diplo; 24; Zikai; Claudia Valentina; Jumpa; Malachiii; Jesse Bluu
- Producers: Diplo; 24; Boaz van de Beatz; Zecca; Ape Drums

Blackpink singles chronology
"The Girls" (2023)	"Jump" (2025)	"Go" (2026)

Music video
- "Jump" on YouTube

"Jump" (Korean: 뛰어; RR: Ttwieo) is a song by South Korean girl group Blackpink. It was released through YG Entertainment on July 11, 2025, as the lead single from the group's third Korean extended play Deadline (2026). The release marked the group's first song to be distributed by the Orchard instead of Interscope Records. The song was written by Teddy, Diplo, 24, Zikai, Claudia Valentina, Jumpa, Malachiii, and Jesse Bluu and produced by Diplo, 24, Boaz van de Beatz, Zecca, Ape Drums. A hardstyle, and dance-pop anthem incorporating club music, techno and EDM, it marked a sharp departure from their previous pop-centric music.

"Jump" was a commercial success and became Blackpink's third number-one song on the Billboard Global 200 and fourth on the Global Excl. US, making them the female act with the most number ones in the latter's history. It topped the charts in Malaysia, Singapore, Taiwan, Thailand, and Vietnam and entered the top ten in Austria, the Czech Republic, Germany, Greece, Hong Kong, Indonesia, Japan, the Netherlands, Latvia, Lithuania, Luxembourg, Peru, the Philippines, Poland, Saudi Arabia, South Korea, Switzerland, and the United Arab Emirates. The song was certified diamond in France, platinum in Australia and Canada, and gold in New Zealand and the United States.

"Jump" received positive reviews from critics, who complimented the song as a sonic pivot for the group and a statement of independence. It was named one of the best K-pop songs of the year by multiple publications and was recognized by Forbes as the most acclaimed K-pop group song of 2025. "Jump" was also selected as the Song of the Year in a public survey conducted by Gallup Korea in 2025. An accompanying music video was directed by Dave Meyers and released on Blackpink's YouTube channel simultaneously with the single's release. To promote the single, Blackpink debuted it on the Deadline World Tour before its release. The song received several accolades, including the daesang (grand prize) for Song of the Year at the 2026 Asia Star Entertainer Awards and Best Digital Song at the 40th Golden Disc Awards.

== Background and release ==
On February 19, 2025, Blackpink announced dates for a world tour starting in July, which was later revealed to be titled the Deadline World Tour. YG Entertainment confirmed on June 9 that the group had been filming a new music video since June 6 in Seoul with a "famous overseas director". On June 23, the label announced that Blackpink will debut their comeback single at the tour's first show on July 5. The group launched an interactive website on July 1 featuring a map of Seoul; two locations were marked on the map by an all-caps sign reading "Do Not Jump" with "Not" crossed out in pink spray paint. On July 4, Blackpink released a teaser video captioned "Ready to Jump?" previewing their new song.

During the opening night of the Deadline World Tour at Goyang Stadium on July 5, Blackpink unveiled "Jump" and performed the song on stage. At the concert, Jennie revealed that the song would be released on streaming platforms later in the week. On July 7, Blackpink released a music video teaser confirming the song's release date to be four days later. "Jump" was released digitally on July 11 through YG Entertainment in a new distribution partnership with the Orchard, instead of the group's previous distributor Interscope Records. It marked the group's first release in two years and 10 months since their second studio album, Born Pink (2022), aside from the video game soundtrack song "The Girls" in 2023. In an interview with Vogue Korea, Lisa confirmed that "Jump" is a pre-release single from the group's upcoming album.

== Lyrics and composition ==
"I would say it’s speed, garage and trance, and the bass line of the drops is almost like Goa trance. It goes into drill and Jersey club. The fill is from a Brazilian genre called from Bahia. The outro is like hard techno, and the beginning drums are more Europop from the '90s, with the guitar line and the whistle. If I said to like, Adele, that 'Hey I’ve got this trance/Jersey club song...' That’s already off limits for somebody like that. This was so fun because they’re like, 'We just want to do something that shocks people, and we don’t care if it’s different.'"

— Diplo, describing the song to Billboard

"Jump" was written by Teddy, Diplo, 24, Zikai, Claudia Valentina, Jumpa, Malachiii and Jesse Bluu, and was produced by Diplo, 24, Boaz van de Beatz, Zecca, and Ape Drums. The track originated from a January 2024 session at Sony Studios in Miami to write Latin music with Diplo, Ape Drums, and Zecca. During the session, Diplo wanted to make "an 'Emerge' kind of acid song", referring to the song by 2000s electroclash duo Fischerspooner. Though initially intended for Major Lazer, it ended up with Argentine duo Ca7riel & Paco Amoroso, who worked with Diplo on arrangement and recorded it. However, the duo moved in a different direction for their music, making the song no longer work for them. He then presented the demo to Blackpink's creative director and lead producer Teddy, who loved its radicalness. Diplo passed the track to Blackpink in May 2025, and the group recorded the song and sent him the files for finishing touches.

"Jump" is a fast-paced, energetic hardstyle, and dance-pop anthem that hybridizes various dance/electronic subgenres. The song begins with a "striking guitar riff" that evokes a Western film and is characterized by "powerful beats, an unpredictable hook, and expressive vocal lines," delivering an "intense, addictive energy that instantly gets pulses racing." Described as a "club track", it shifts between moments of techno, drill, hardstyle, and trance with a chorus melody evoking Da Hool's 1997 rave anthem "Meet Her at the Love Parade". The song blends elements of club music, synth-pop, techno and EDM, a bold departure from the group's usual pop-focused sound. The track has been described as a marked transformation from the group's previous musical style and features an "addictive chorus".

Lyrically, "Jump" centers around the power of a night out with the girls; it begins with Rosé and Jisoo explaining to a presumed former lover the wild feeling that takes them over at times. In the chorus, Jennie and Lisa urge everyone to run up on the dance floor and jump. The second verse discusses how sisterhood leads to liberation for the girls, before the chorus repeats the theme of women dancing and jumping their feelings out.

== Critical reception ==
Professional ratings
Review scores
Source	Rating
IZM	1.5/5 stars

"Jump" received generally positive reviews from critics and was recognized by Forbes as the most acclaimed K-pop group song of 2025. Billboard placed "Jump" on their list of the best songs of the year at number 53, with writer James Dinh praising the group's sonic pivot into the rave scene. He added that the pre-release single indicates that Blackpink's "looming album holds plenty of promise". Writing for Rolling Stone India, Debashree Dutta placed "Jump" on their list of the best K-pop songs of the year, noting the change from the group's "usual glossy pop for an edgier, hard-style intensity." She lauded it as a "statement of independence" that bursts with "city‑street energy until the iconic 'Blackpink in your area' sign‑off perfectly rounds out the song." NME also named "Jump" the 11th best K-pop song of the year. Writing for the publication, Tamar Herman commended the club song's "visceral sense of movement" as it heads to the outro, in which the "ever-charismatic" group turn up the bass to "earth-shattering levels to keep you on the dancefloor." On the other hand, IZM's Park Soo-seok criticized the song's familiar structure and flashy beats, in contrast to the members' advancements in their solo music.

"Jump" on year-end lists
Critic/Publication	List	Rank	Ref.
Billboard	The 100 Best Songs of 2025: Staff Picks	53	
Billboard	The 50 Best Dance Tracks of 2025: Staff Picks	10	
Billboard	The 25 Best K-Pop Songs of 2025: Staff Picks	16	
The Hollywood Reporter	The 40 Best K-Pop Songs of 2025	26	
NME	The 25 best K-pop songs of 2025	11	
Rolling Stone India	The 25 Best K-Pop Songs of 2025	—N/a	
Rolling Stone Korea	2025 Ranking: Song of the Year	—N/a	

== Accolades ==
On South Korean music programs, "Jump" won ten first-place trophies, including three triple crowns on Inkigayo, M Countdown and Show! Music Core. It also won two weekly Melon Popularity Awards on August 4 and August 11, 2025.

Awards and nominations
Year	Organization	Award	Result	Ref.
2025	Asian Pop Music Awards	Top 20 Songs of the Year	Won	
2025	Asian Pop Music Awards	People's Choice Award	8th place	
2025	Asian Pop Music Awards	Song of the Year	Nominated	
2025	BreakTudo Awards	International Music Video	Nominated	
2025	Korea Grand Music Awards	Best Dance Performance	Nominated	
2025	Korea Grand Music Awards	Best Music Video	Nominated	
2025	MAMA Awards	Best Dance Performance Female Group	Nominated	
2025	MAMA Awards	Best Music Video	Nominated	
2025	MAMA Awards	Song of the Year	Nominated	
2026	Asia Star Entertainer Awards	Song of the Year	Won	
2026	Clio Awards	Music Marketing – Visual Effects	Bronze	
2026	Golden Disc Awards	Best Digital Song (Bonsang)	Won	
2026	Golden Disc Awards	Song of the Year (Daesang)	Nominated	
2026	iHeartRadio Music Awards	Best Music Video	Nominated	
2026	iHeartRadio Music Awards	Favorite TikTok Dance	Nominated	
2026	iHeartRadio Music Awards	K-pop Song of the Year	Nominated	
2026	KM Chart Awards	Best Popular Song Award	Nominated	
2026	MTV Video Music Awards	Best K-Pop	Nominated	
2026	Music Awards Japan	Best K-Pop Song in Japan	Won	
2026	Music Awards Japan	Best of Listeners' Choice: International Song	Nominated	
2026	TMElive International Music Awards	The Best Song of the Year	Won	

Music program awards
Program	Date	Ref.
Inkigayo	August 3, 2025	
Inkigayo	August 10, 2025	
Inkigayo	August 17, 2025	
M Countdown	July 17, 2025	
M Countdown	July 24, 2025	
M Countdown	July 31, 2025	
Show Champion	July 23, 2025	
Show! Music Core	August 2, 2025	
Show! Music Core	August 16, 2025	
Show! Music Core	August 23, 2025	

== Commercial performance ==
Upon release, "Jump" reached number one on Spotify's daily songs chart, making Blackpink the first K-pop group with three chart-toppers after "Pink Venom" and "Shut Down" in 2022. It spent six days atop the chart and debuted at number one on Spotify's weekly chart, making them the first K-pop girl group to have topped the list twice following "Shut Down". The song crossed 300 million streams on Spotify in 80 days, the fastest K-pop girl group song to do so. "Jump" debuted at number one on the Billboard Global 200 with 123 million streams and 14,000 sold worldwide in the week ending July 17. It marked the group's third number-one song after "Pink Venom" and "Shut Down" and their fifth top-ten song on the chart. It was the first song in four months to cross 100 million streams globally, since Lady Gaga and Bruno Mars's "Die with a Smile" in March. "Jump" simultaneously debuted at number one on the Global Excl. US with 109.9 million streams and 11,000 sold outside the US. It marked their fourth number-one song on the chart after "Lovesick Girls" in 2020 and "Pink Venom" and "Shut Down" in 2022. With this, Blackpink became the female act with the most number ones in the chart's history, breaking out of a tie with Ariana Grande and Taylor Swift and only behind BTS's seven. It marked the eighth number-one song by the group including entries by its members as soloists. Counting number-one entries by members Rosé's "On the Ground" (2021) and "Apt." (2024), Jennie's "You & Me" (2023), and Lisa's "Rockstar" (2024), "Jump" extended the streak of Blackpink and/or one of its members topping the chart each year since its 2020 inception. 89% of the song's streams and 75% of its sales were based outside the United States, marking the biggest non-US streaming count since "Apt." in January. The last group to achieve a higher streaming count with a non-holiday release was Blackpink themselves with "Shut Down" in 2022.

In South Korea, "Jump" debuted at number 41 on the Circle Digital Chart for the week dated July 12 with less than two days of tracking. In its first full tracking week, the song rose to number three, where it remained for another seven consecutive weeks. In its eleventh week on the chart, "Jump" rose to a new peak at number two. In other Asian countries, "Jump" topped the charts in Malaysia, Singapore. Taiwan, Thailand, and Vietnam, and reached the top ten in Hong Kong. India. Indonesia, Japan, the Philippines, Saudi Arabia, and the United Arab Emirates. In North America, the song debuted at number 28 on the US Billboard Hot 100, earning the group their milestone tenth entry on the chart. It became their longest-running song on the Billboard Hot 100 and their first to spend 10 weeks on the chart. With this, Blackpink joined BTS, Fifty Fifty, Huntrix and the Saja Boys as the only K-pop groups to have a song chart for 10 weeks. On January 15, 2026, "Jump" was certified gold by the Recording Industry Association of America (RIAA) for surpassing 500,000 units sold in the United States, achieved through streaming alone. It also debuted at number 19 on the Billboard Canadian Hot 100, later receiving a platinum certification from Music Canada.

"Jump" reached the top ten in several European nations, including Austria, the Czech Republic, Germany, Greece, Latvia, Lithuania, Luxembourg, the Netherlands, Poland, and Switzerland. It also entered the top 20 in France, Hungary, Ireland, Portugal, Slovakia, and the United Kingdom, and the top 40 in Flanders, Wallonia, Spain, and Sweden. In Latin America, "Jump" entered the top ten in Peru, the top 20 in Brazil and Chile, and the top 30 in Bolivia. In Oceania, the song entered the top 15 in both Australia and New Zealand.

== Music video ==
A music video teaser for "Jump" was released on July 7, 2025, ahead of the official music video release on July 11. The teaser begins by panning around a cityscape with billboards for each of the group's members. The camera zooms in on a brick wall featuring a mural of Blackpink and the group standing in front of the mural with outfits that are blending in with the mural. The music video was directed by Dave Meyers. YG Entertainment described the music video as portraying Blackpink's influence and narrative as a group, emphasizing the group's "perfect synergy" as they reunite after two years and 10 months. Upon release, the music video claimed the top spot on YouTube's global daily chart for eight consecutive days and surpassed 100 million views in just 15 days, becoming their 49th video to cross the milestone.

== Live performances and promotion ==
To commemorate Blackpink's comeback release and world tour, YG Entertainment launched the Pink Area: Takeover Lighting campaign, which included marketing tactics such as broadcasting the "Jump" music video on various electronic billboards across Seoul and lighting up Namsan Tower, Sebitseom, and Banpo Bridge in pink. "Jump" was included on the set list of Blackpink's Deadline World Tour, which started on July 5.

== Impact ==
"Jump" was named Song of the Year in South Korean research company Gallup Korea's annual public survey of respondents under the age of 40 in 2025. It was also selected by former President of the United States Barack Obama as one of his favorite songs of 2025. During the 2026 FIFA World Cup, "Jump" was chosen as the South Korea national football team's designated goal song. Following the song's release, Blackpink was credited as one of the groups that helped bring the techno genre back into the mainstream global spotlight. Music critics noticed K-pop's shift away from "cutesy" themed tracks towards more aggressive beats and club aesthetics, including Illit's "It's Me" and Ive's "Bang Bang".

== Credits and personnel ==
Credits adapted from the liner notes of Deadline and Billboard.

Recording

- Recorded at The Black Label Studio (Seoul)

Personnel

- Blackpink – vocals
- Teddy – songwriter
- Diplo – songwriter, producer
- 24 – songwriter, producer
- Zikai – songwriter
- Claudia Valentina – songwriter
- Jumpa – songwriter
- Malachiii – songwriter
- Jesse Bluu – songwriter
- Boaz van de Beatz – producer
- Zecca – producer
- Ape Drums – producer

== Charts ==
=== Weekly charts ===
Weekly chart performance for "Jump"
Chart (2025–2026)	Peak position
Argentina Hot 100 (Billboard)	42
Australia (ARIA)	12
Austria (Ö3 Austria Top 40)	6
Belarus Airplay (TopHit)	6
Belgium (Ultratop 50 Flanders)	38
Belgium (Ultratop 50 Wallonia)	22
Bolivia (Billboard)	25
Brazil Hot 100 (Billboard)	12
Canada Hot 100 (Billboard)	19
Canada CHR/Top 40 (Billboard)	23
Central America Anglo Airplay (Monitor Latino)	3
Chile (Billboard)	14
China (TME Korean)	1
CIS Airplay (TopHit)	15
Costa Rica Anglo Airplay (Monitor Latino)	3
Croatia International Airplay (Top lista)	10
Czech Republic Singles Digital (ČNS IFPI)	6
Ecuador Anglo Airplay (Monitor Latino)	9
El Salvador Anglo Airplay (Monitor Latino)	1
Estonia Airplay (TopHit)	11
Finland (Suomen virallinen lista)	42
France (SNEP)	15
Germany (GfK)	8
Global 200 (Billboard)	1
Greece International (IFPI)	3
Guatemala Anglo Airplay (Monitor Latino)	1
Honduras Anglo Airplay (Monitor Latino)	1
Hong Kong (Billboard)	2
Hungary (Single Top 40)	14
India International (IMI)	9
Indonesia (IFPI)	2
Ireland (IRMA)	18
Israel (Mako Hitlist)	88
Italy (FIMI)	54
Japan Hot 100 (Billboard)	8
Japan Combined Singles (Oricon)	13
Kazakhstan Airplay (TopHit)	17
Latin America Anglo Airplay (Monitor Latino)	9
Latvia Airplay (LaIPA)	13
Latvia Streaming (LaIPA)	3
Lithuania (AGATA)	6
Luxembourg (Billboard)	4
Malaysia (IFPI)	1
Mexico Anglo Airplay (Monitor Latino)	8
Middle East and North Africa (IFPI)	6
Netherlands (Dutch Top 40)	9
Netherlands (Single Top 100)	15
New Zealand (Recorded Music NZ)	13
Nicaragua Airplay (Monitor Latino)	15
Norway (IFPI Norge)	56
Panama Anglo Airplay (Monitor Latino)	9
Peru (Billboard)	5
Philippines (IFPI)	5
Poland (Polish Airplay Top 100)	23
Poland (Polish Streaming Top 100)	10
Portugal (AFP)	13
Russia Airplay (TopHit)	16
Saudi Arabia (IFPI)	5
Singapore (RIAS)	1
Slovakia Airplay (ČNS IFPI)	45
Slovakia Singles Digital (ČNS IFPI)	11
South Korea (Circle)	2
Spain (Promusicae)	37
Sweden (Sverigetopplistan)	38
Switzerland (Schweizer Hitparade)	6
Taiwan (Billboard)	1
Thailand (IFPI)	1
United Arab Emirates (IFPI)	4
UK Singles (Official Charts)	18
UK Indie (Official Charts)	2
Uruguay Anglo Airplay (Monitor Latino)	13
US Billboard Hot 100	28
US Hot Dance/Pop Songs (Billboard)	2
US Pop Airplay (Billboard)	19
Venezuela Anglo Airplay (Monitor Latino)	6
Vietnam (IFPI)	1

=== Monthly charts ===
Monthly chart performance for "Jump"
Chart (2025)	Peak position
Belarus Airplay (TopHit)	9
CIS Airplay (TopHit)	18
Estonia Airplay (TopHit)	14
Kazakhstan Airplay (TopHit)	19
Latvia Airplay (TopHit)	22
Lithuania Airplay (TopHit)	17
Russia Airplay (TopHit)	20
South Korea (Circle)	3

=== Year-end charts ===
Year-end chart performance for "Jump"
Chart (2025)	Position
Belarus Airplay (TopHit)	70
Belgium (Ultratop 50 Flanders)	164
Belgium (Ultratop 50 Wallonia)	113
Canada (Canadian Hot 100)	97
Canada CHR/Top 40 (Billboard)	81
CIS Airplay (TopHit)	127
Estonia Airplay (TopHit)	61
France (SNEP)	118
Global 200 (Billboard)	110
Latvia Airplay (TopHit)	56
Lithuania Airplay (TopHit)	173
Netherlands (Dutch Top 40)	63
Netherlands (Single Top 100)	88
Russia Airplay (TopHit)	166
South Korea (Circle)	18
Switzerland (Schweizer Hitparade)	97
US Hot Dance/Pop Songs (Billboard)	8

== Certifications ==
Certifications for "Jump"
Region	Certification	Certified units/sales
Australia (ARIA)	Platinum	70,000^{‡}
Belgium (BRMA)	Platinum	40,000^{‡}
Canada (Music Canada)	Platinum	80,000^{‡}
France (SNEP)	Diamond	333,333^{‡}
New Zealand (RMNZ)	Gold	15,000^{‡}
Portugal (AFP)	Gold	12,000^{‡}
Spain (Promusicae)	Gold	50,000^{‡}
United Kingdom (BPI)	Silver	200,000^{‡}
United States (RIAA)	Gold	500,000^{‡}
Streaming
Japan (RIAJ)	Gold	50,000,000^{†}
^{‡} Sales+streaming figures based on certification alone.^{†} Streaming-only figures based on certification alone.

== Release history ==
Release dates and formats
Region	Date	Format	Label	Ref.
Various	July 11, 2025	Digital download; streaming	YG	
United States	July 16, 2025	Contemporary hit radio	YG; The Orchard	
Italy	August 1, 2025	Radio airplay	Sony; The Orchard	

== See also ==
- List of best-selling girl group singles
- List of Billboard Global 200 number ones of 2025
- List of Inkigayo Chart winners (2025)
- List of K-pop songs on the Billboard charts
- List of M Countdown Chart winners (2025)
- List of number-one songs (Thailand)
- List of number-one songs of 2025 (Malaysia)
- List of number-one songs of 2025 (Singapore)
- List of Billboard number-one songs of 2025 (Vietnam)
- List of Official Vietnam Chart number-one songs of 2025
- List of Show! Music Core Chart winners (2025)
- List of Show Champion Chart winners (2025)
