= List of Show! Music Core Chart winners (2025) =

Show! Music Core Chart winners (2025)

The Show! Music Core Chart is a record chart on the South Korean MBC television music program Show! Music Core. Every week, the show awards the best-performing single on the chart in the country during its live broadcast. Since November 11, 2023, the show has been hosted by Lee Jung-ha, Sullyoon, and Younghoon until February 15, 2025. On February 10, 2025, it was announced that Hearts2Hearts' A-Na, TWS' Dohoon, and Zerobaseone's Kim Gyu-vin would host the show starting on March 1, 2025.

== Chart history ==
Key
†	Indicates a Triple Crown
‡	Highest score in 2025
—	No show was held

Episode	Date	Artist	Song	Points	Ref.
—N/a	January 4	No show, winner not announced			
883	January 11	G-Dragon	"Home Sweet Home" † (Note: "Home Sweet Home" ranked number one for one week in 2024.)	6,918	
884	January 18	G-Dragon	"Home Sweet Home" †	6,581	
885	January 25	Ive	"Rebel Heart" †	8,341	
886	February 1	Special episode, winner not announced			
887	February 8	Ive	"Rebel Heart" †	7,347	
888	February 15	Plave	"Dash"	9,571	
889	February 22	Ive	"Rebel Heart" †	5,937	
890	March 1	Ive	"Attitude"	6,169	
891	March 8	G-Dragon	"Too Bad" †	7,465	
892	March 15	G-Dragon	"Too Bad" †	7,864	
—N/a	March 22	No show, winner not announced			
893	March 29	G-Dragon	"Too Bad" †	6,893	
894	April 5	KiiiKiii	"I Do Me"	5,936	
895	April 12	Jennie	"Like Jennie"	6,095	
896	April 19	Mark	"1999"	7,159	
897	April 26	NCT Wish	"Poppop"	6,293	
898	May 3	TWS	"Countdown"	6,448	
899	May 10	Le Sserafim	"Hot"	6,546	
900	May 17	Day6	"Maybe Tomorrow"	6,763	
901	May 24	BoyNextDoor	"I Feel Good"	8,124	
902	May 31	Riize	"Fly Up"	9,319	
903	June 7	Seventeen	"Thunder"	9,655 ‡	
904	June 14	Seventeen	"Thunder"	6,901	
905	June 21	Doyoung	"Memory"	8,246	
906	June 28	Kang Daniel	"Episode"	5,954	
—N/a	July 5	No show, winner not announced			
907	July 12	Aespa	"Dirty Work"	7,474	
908	July 19	AllDay Project	"Famous"	6,365	
909	July 26	NCT Dream	"BTTF"	6,792	
910	August 2	Blackpink	"Jump" †	6,757	
911	August 9	Special episode, winner not announced			
912	August 16	Blackpink	"Jump" †	7,893	
913	August 23	Blackpink	"Jump" †	6,684	
914	August 30	Stray Kids	"Ceremony"	7,662	
915	September 6	Ive	"XOXZ"	6,914	
916	September 13	Zerobaseone	"Iconik"	7,007	
917	September 20	Aespa	"Rich Man" †	6,537	
918	September 27	Aespa	"Rich Man" †	6,807	
919	October 4	Aespa	"Rich Man" †	6,782	
—N/a	October 11	No show, winner not announced			
920	October 18	Ive	"XOXZ"	6,744	
921	October 25	Nmixx	"Blue Valentine" †	8,377	
922	November 1	Lee Chan-won	"Maybe Today"	7,274	
—N/a	November 8	No show, winner not announced			
923	November 15	Nmixx	"Blue Valentine" †	6,805	
924	November 22	Nmixx	"Blue Valentine" †	6,143	
925	November 29	NCT Dream	"Beat It Up"	6,570	
926	December 6	Hwasa	"Good Goodbye"	6,128	
927	December 13	Hwasa	"Good Goodbye"	6,817	
928	December 20	Doyoung	"Promise"	7,553	
929	December 27	Special episode, winner not announced			

== See also ==
- List of Inkigayo Chart winners (2025)
- List of M Countdown Chart winners (2025)
- List of Music Bank Chart winners (2025)
- List of Show Champion Chart winners (2025)
- List of The Show Chart winners (2025)
