= Rich Man (EP) =

- Digital cover

EP by Aespa
- Released: September 5, 2025
- Length: 19:09
- Language: English; Korean
- Label: SM; Kakao; Warner Japan; Capitol

Aespa chronology
| Dirty Work (2025) | Rich Man (2025) | Synk: Aexis Line (2025) |

Singles from Rich Man
- 1. "Rich Man" Released: September 5, 2025

Professional ratings
Review scores
| Source | Rating |
|---|---|
| IZM | 2/5 stars |

Rich Man is the sixth extended play by South Korean girl group Aespa. It was released by SM Entertainment on September 5, 2025, and contains six tracks, including the lead single of the same name.

== Background and release ==
On August 4, 2025, SM Entertainment announced that Aespa would release their sixth extended play titled Rich Man on September 5, featuring six tracks including the lead single of the same name. The following day, the promotional schedule was released. On August 25, a trailer titled "I am a Rich Man", directed by Lee Ok-seop and featuring actor Koo Kyo-hwan, was released. Three days later, the highlight medley was released. On September 4, the music video teaser for "Rich Man" was released. The album was released alongside the music video for "Rich Man" on September 5.

== Composition ==
Rich Man contains six tracks. The lead single, "Rich Man", is a dance track characterized by a "rough electric guitar rhythm" with lyrics delivering "a message of confidence and independence". The second track, "Drift", is a "fast-tempo" hip-hop dance song characterized by "whistle rhythm". The third track, "Bubble", is a dance song featuring "a minimalist harmony of heavy drum and bass" with lyrics conveying "a playful message of bursting open the other person's pretense".

The fourth track, "Count on Me", is an R&B song highlighted by "dreamy synths" with lyrics that "express the sorrow of being willing to endure pain as long as you have someone you love". The fifth track, "Angel #48", is a pop song defined by a "dreamy and cheerful rhythm" with lyrics that "compare a fateful someone to 'Angel #48'". The final track, "To the Girls", is a "medium-tempo" pop song with lyrics "expressing Aespa's heartfelt message of encouragement to believe in yourself and move forward".

== Accolades ==
Awards and nominations for Rich Man
| Award ceremony | Year | Category | Result | Ref. |
|---|---|---|---|---|
| Asian Pop Music Awards | 2025 | People's Choice Awards | Won | |
| Golden Disc Awards | 2026 | Best Album | Nominated | |

== Track listing ==
Track listing for Rich Man
| No. | Title | Lyrics | Music | Arrangement | Length |
|---|---|---|---|---|---|
| 1. | "Rich Man" | Le'mon (153/Joombas) | Cody Tarpley; Rachel Kanner; Ben Samama; Ryan Jhun | Cody Tarpley; Ryan Jhun | 3:18 |
| 2. | "Drift" | Lee Geu-rin (Lalala Studio) | Stian Nyhammer Olsen; Herbert St. Clair Crichlow; Paulos Solbø; Stephny Ko; Julia Finnseter | Stian Nyhammer Olsen | 2:58 |
| 3. | "Bubble" | Kang Eun-jeong | Gingerbread; Rachel West; Oliva Ruby | Gingerbread | 2:30 |
| 4. | "Count on Me" | Mola | Bryan Fryzel; Kella Armitage; Stephanie Jane Lang | Frequency | 3:33 |
| 5. | "Angel #48" | Wilhelmina | Kenzie; Greg Bonnick; Hayden Chapman; Wilhelmina | LDN Noise | 3:15 |
| 6. | "To the Girls" | Lee Seu-ran | Andreas Öhrn; Peter Boström; Andrea Danielsson | Peter Boström | 3:35 |
| Total length: | | | | | 19:09 |

== Credits and personnel ==
Credits adapted from the EP's liner notes.

Studio

- SM Wavelet Studio – recording (track 1–3, 5–6), digital editing (track 1, 5–6), engineered for mix (track 5–6)
- SM Droplet Studio – recording (track 1)
- SM Yellow Tail Studio – recording (track 2, 4, 6), digital editing, engineered for mix (track 4)
- SM Aube Studio – recording, digital editing (track 2–3), engineered for mix (track 2)
- Vibe Music Studio 606 – recording (track 2, 6)
- Golden Bell Tree Sound – recording (track 4)
- SM Big Shot Studio – recording (track 5)
- Doobdoob Studio – recording (track 5)
- 77F Studio – digital editing (track 2)
- SM Starlight Studio – digital editing (track 5), mixing (track 3, 5)
- SM Concert Hall Studio – mixing (track 1, 6)
- SM Blue Cup Studio – mixing (track 2)
- SM Blue Ocean Studio – mixing (track 4)
- Sterling Sound – mastering (all tracks)

Personnel

- SM Entertainment – executive producer
- Aespa – vocals, background vocals (all tracks)
- Le'mon (153/Joombas) – lyrics (track 1)
- Cody Tarpley – producer, composition, arrangement, programming (track 1)
- Rachel Kanner – composition, background vocals (track 1)
- Ben Samama – composition (track 1)
- Ryan Jhun – producer, composition, arrangement, programming (track 1)
- Lee Geu-rin (Lalala Studio) – lyrics (track 2)
- Stian Nyhammer Olsen – producer, composition, arrangement, bass, keyboard, FX, drums programming (track 2)
- Herbert St. Clair Crichlow a.k.a. Herbie Crichlow – composition, whistle (track 2)
- Paulos Solbø – composition (track 2)
- Stephny Ko – composition (track 2)
- Julia Finnseter – composition (track 2)
- Kang Eun-jeong – lyrics (track 3)
- Gingerbread – producer, composition, arrangement, background vocals, drums, synthesizer, drums programming (track 3)
- Rachel West – composition (track 3)
- Oliva Ruby – composition (track 3)
- Mola – lyrics (track 4)
- Brian Fryzel a.k.a. Frequency – producer, composition, arrangement (track 4)
- Kella Armitage – composition (track 4)
- Stephanie Jane Lang – composition (track 4)
- Wilhelmina – lyrics, composition, background vocals (track 5)
- Kenzie – composition (track 5)
- Greg Bonnick (LDN Noise) – producer, composition, arrangement, bass, keyboard, synthesizer, drums programming (track 5)
- Hayden Chapman (LDN Noise) – producer, composition, arrangement, bass, keyboard, synthesizer, drums programming (track 5)
- Lee Seu-ran – lyrics (track 6)
- Andreas Öhrn – composition, background vocals (track 6)
- Peter Boström – producer, composition, arrangement (track 6)
- Andrea Danielsson – composition, background vocals (track 6)
- Joowon – vocal directing (track 1, 4)
- Emily Yeonseo Kim – vocal directing (track 2, 5–6)
- 1Take (NewType) – vocal directing (track 3)
- Kang Eun-ji – recording (track 1–3, 5–6), digital editing (track 1, 5–6), engineered for mix (track 5–6)
- Kim Joo-hyun – recording (track 1)
- Noh Min-ji – recording (track 2, 4, 6), digital editing, engineered for mix (track 4)
- Kim Hyo-joon – recording, digital editing (track 2–3), engineered for mix (track 2)
- Jeong Mo-yeon – recording (track 2, 6)
- Kim Kwang-min – recording (track 4)
- Lee Min-kyu – recording (track 5)
- Eugene Kwon – recording (track 5)
- Woo Min-jeong – digital editing (track 2)
- Jeong Yoo-ra – digital editing (track 5), mixing (track 3, 5)
- Nam Koong-jin – mixing (track 1, 6)
- Jung Eui-seok – mixing (track 2)
- Kim Cheol-sun – mixing (track 4)
- Chris Gehringer – mastering (all tracks)

== Charts ==
=== Weekly charts ===
Weekly chart performance for Rich Man
| Chart (2025–2026) | Peak position |
|---|---|
| Austrian Albums (Ö3 Austria) | 68 |
| Belgian Albums (Ultratop Flanders) | 77 |
| Belgian Albums (Ultratop Wallonia) | 90 |
| Croatian International Albums (HDU) | 7 |
| French Albums (SNEP) | 66 |
| German Albums (Offizielle Top 100) | 94 |
| Japanese Albums (Oricon) | 7 |
| Japanese Combined Albums (Oricon) | 7 |
| Japanese Hot Albums (Billboard Japan) | 7 |
| Portuguese Albums (AFP) | 41 |
| South Korean Albums (Circle) | 4 |
| US Billboard 200 | 14 |

=== Monthly charts ===
Monthly chart performance for Rich Man
| Chart (2025) | Position |
|---|---|
| Japanese Albums (Oricon) | 11 |
| South Korean Albums (Circle) | 3 |

=== Year-end charts ===
Year-end chart performance for Rich Man
| Chart (2025) | Position |
|---|---|
| Japanese Albums (Oricon) | 76 |
| Japanese Top Albums Sales (Billboard Japan) | 76 |
| South Korean Albums (Circle) | 15 |

== Certifications ==
Certifications for Rich Man
| Region | Certification | Certified units/sales |
|---|---|---|
| South Korea (KMCA) | Million | 1,000,000^{^} |
^{^} Shipments figures based on certification alone.

== Release history ==
Release history for Rich Man
| Region | Date | Format | Label |
|---|---|---|---|
| South Korea | September 5, 2025 | CD | SM; Kakao; Capitol |
| Various | September 5, 2025 | Digital download; streaming | SM; Kakao; Capitol |
| Japan | September 6, 2025 | CD | SM; Warner Japan |
