= List of Inkigayo Chart winners (2025) =

Inkigayo Chart winners (2025)

The Inkigayo Chart is a music program record chart on Seoul Broadcasting System (SBS) that gives an award to the best-performing single of the week in South Korea. The show aired every Sunday at 3:20 p.m. KST and was broadcast from the SBS Open Hall in Deungchon-dong, Gangseo-gu, Seoul. Every week, the show awards the best-performing single on the chart in the country during its live broadcast. The show had been hosted by Han Yu-jin, Leeseo, and Moon Seong-hyun since April 2024. In September 2025, Han Yu-jin and Moon Seong-hyun stepped down from their positions. Shinyu joined Leeseo as a new host on October 19, followed by EJ on November 9.

== Scoring system ==
Period covered	Chart system					Ref.
Period covered	Digital sales	On-Air	Physical album	Video views	Voting	Ref.
October 6, 2024 – present	50%	10%	10%	20%	10% (5% pre-vote + 5% live-vote)	

== Chart history ==
Key
†	Indicates a Triple Crown
‡	Indicates the highest score of the year
—	No show was held

Chart history
Episode	Date	Artist	Song	Points	Ref.
1,250	January 5	G-Dragon	"Home Sweet Home" † (Note: "Home Sweet Home" ranked number one for one week in 2024.)	5,807	
1,251	January 12	G-Dragon	"Home Sweet Home" †	5,418	
1,252	January 19	BoyNextDoor	"If I Say, I Love You"	5,869	
1,253	January 26	Ive	"Rebel Heart" †	6,580	
1,254	February 2	Ive	"Rebel Heart" †	6,150	
1,255	February 9	Ive	"Rebel Heart" †	7,588	
1,256	February 16	Ive	"Attitude"	6,247	
1,257	February 23	Ive	"Attitude"	5,357	
1,258	March 2	Jisoo	"Earthquake"	5,759	
1,259	March 9	G-Dragon	"Too Bad" †	6,788	
1,260	March 16	G-Dragon	"Too Bad" †	8,906 ‡	
1,261	March 23	G-Dragon	"Too Bad" †	5,796	
1,262	March 30	Nmixx	"Know About Me"	5,070	
1,263	April 6	Le Sserafim	"Hot"	5,411	
—	April 13	No show, winner not announced			
1,264	April 20	Le Sserafim	"Hot"	4,556	
—	April 27	No show, winner not announced			
1,265	May 4	TWS	"Countdown"	5,987	
1,266	May 11	Woodz	"Drowning"	5,179	
1,267	May 18	Tomorrow X Together	"Love Language"	4,750	
1,268	May 25	BoyNextDoor	"I Feel Good"	6,069	
1,269	June 1	Riize	"Fly Up"	5,655	
1,270	June 8	Seventeen	"Thunder"	7,834	
1,271	June 15	Enhypen	"Bad Desire (With or Without You)"	5,125	
1,272	June 22	Woodz	"Drowning"	4,434	
1,273	June 29	Illit	"Do the Dance"	5,894	
1,274	July 6	Aespa	"Dirty Work"	5,692	
1,275	July 13	Aespa	"Dirty Work"	6,709	
—	July 20	No show, winner not announced			
—	July 27	No show, winner not announced			
1,276	August 3	Blackpink	"Jump" †	7,289	
1,277	August 10	Blackpink	"Jump" †	6,909	
1,278	August 17	Blackpink	"Jump" †	7,838	
1,279	August 24	AllDay Project	"Famous"	5,669	
1,280	August 31	Stray Kids	"Ceremony"	5,804	
1,281	September 7	Ive	"XOXZ"	6,262	
1,282	September 14	Zerobaseone	"Iconik"	4,913	
1,283	September 21	Aespa	"Rich Man" †	7,315	
1,284	September 28	Aespa	"Rich Man" †	5,851	
—	October 5	No show, winner not announced			
1,285	October 12	Aespa	"Rich Man" †	4,605	
1,286	October 19	Ive	"XOXZ"	5,498	
1,287	October 26	Nmixx	"Blue Valentine" †	5,454	
1,288	November 2	BoyNextDoor	"Hollywood Action"	6,473	
1,289	November 9	Nmixx	"Blue Valentine" †	4,845	
1,290	November 16	Nmixx	"Blue Valentine" †	5,044	
1,291	November 23	Le Sserafim	"Spaghetti"	4,907	
1,292	November 30	AllDay Project	"One More Time"	6,010	
1,293	December 7	Hwasa	"Good Goodbye" † (Note: "Good Goodbye" ranked number one for two weeks in 2026.)	5,993	
—	December 14	No show, winner not announced			
—	December 21	No show, winner not announced			
—	December 28	No show, winner not announced			

== See also ==
- List of M Countdown Chart winners (2025)
- List of Music Bank Chart winners (2025)
- List of Show Champion Chart winners (2025)
- List of Show! Music Core Chart winners (2025)
- List of The Show Chart winners (2025)
