= List of The Show Chart winners (2025) =

The Show Chart winners (2025)

The Show Chart is a music program record chart on SBS M that gives an award to the best-performing single of the week in South Korea. Starting from March 2025, The Show will be hosted by Cravity's Song Hyeong-jun, Izna's Jeong Sae-bi, and WayV's Xiaojun.

== Chart history ==
Key
	Indicates a Triple Crown
	Highest score of the year
—	No show was held

Episode	Date	Artist	Song	Points	Ref.
—N/a	January 7	No Broadcast or Winner			
—N/a	January 14	No Broadcast or Winner			
—N/a	January 21	No Broadcast or Winner			
—N/a	January 28	No Broadcast or Winner			
—N/a	February 4	No Broadcast or Winner			
—N/a	February 11	No Broadcast or Winner			
—N/a	February 18	No Broadcast or Winner			
—N/a	February 25	No Broadcast or Winner			
370	March 4	Zerobaseone	"Blue"	9,570	
371	March 11	Hearts2Hearts	"The Chase"	8,500	
—N/a	March 18	No Broadcast or Winner			
372	March 25	STAYC	"Bebe"	7,421	
373	April 1	Ten	"Stunner"	8,600	
374	April 8	Close Your Eyes	"All My Poetry"	8,605	
375	April 15	Izna	"Sign"	8,450	
—N/a	April 22	No Broadcast or Winner			
376	April 29	TWS	"Countdown"	9,570	
—N/a	May 6	No Broadcast or Winner			
—N/a	May 13	No Broadcast or Winner			
377	May 20	TripleS	"Are You Alive"	9,560	
—N/a	May 27	No Broadcast or Winner			
—N/a	June 3	No Broadcast or Winner			
378	June 10	N.Flying	"Everlasting"	8,530	
379	June 17	Izna	"Beep"	7,477	
380	June 24	Kang Daniel	"Episode"	7,910	
381	July 1	Cravity	"Set Net Go?!"	9,570	
382	July 8	AHOF	"Rendezvous"	7,980	
383	July 15	Close Your Eyes	"Snowy Summer"	6,002	
—N/a	July 22	No Broadcast or Winner			
384	July 29	WayV	"Big Bands"	7,650	
—N/a	August 5	No Broadcast or Winner			
385	August 12	Evnne	"How Can I Do"	6,320	
386	August 19	KiiiKiii	"Dancing Alone"	6,242	
387	August 26	Kep1er	"Bubble Gum"	9,490	
—N/a	September 2	No Broadcast or Winner			
388	September 9	Zerobaseone	"Iconik"	9,310	
—N/a	September 16	No Broadcast or Winner			
389	September 23	Dayoung	"Body"	6,590	
—N/a	September 30	No Broadcast or Winner			
—N/a	October 7	No Broadcast or Winner			
—N/a	October 14	No Broadcast or Winner			
390	October 21	TWS	"Overdrive"	8,970	
391	October 28	Hearts2Hearts	"Focus"	9,075	
392	November 4	&Team	"Back to Life"	9,340	
393	November 11	AHOF	"Pinocchio"	9,610	
—N/a	November 18	No Broadcast or Winner			
—N/a	November 25	No Broadcast or Winner			
—N/a	December 2	No Broadcast or Winner			
—N/a	December 9	No Broadcast or Winner			
—N/a	December 16	No Broadcast or Winner			
—N/a	December 23	No Broadcast or Winner			
—N/a	December 30	No Broadcast or Winner			

== See also ==
- List of Inkigayo Chart winners (2025)
- List of M Countdown Chart winners (2025)
- List of Music Bank Chart winners (2025)
- List of Show Champion Chart winners (2025)
- List of Show! Music Core Chart winners (2025)
