= Dirty Work (Aespa song) =

- Digital cover

Single by Aespa

from the album Dirty Work
- Language: Korean; English
- Released: June 27, 2025
- Genre: Dance
- Length: 3:00
- Label: SM; Kakao
- Composers: Evan Blair; Taylor Upsahl; Elijah Noll; Imlay
- Lyricist: Jeong Mul-hwa (Jamfactory)

Aespa singles chronology
"Whiplash" (2024)	"Dirty Work" (2025)	"Rich Man" (2025)

Aespa chronology
Whiplash (2024)	Dirty Work (2025)	Rich Man (2025)

Music video
- "Dirty Work" on YouTube

Professional ratings
Review scores
Source	Rating
IZM	2/5 stars

"Dirty Work" is song recorded by South Korean girl group Aespa for their first single album of the same name. It was released by SM Entertainment on June 27, 2025.

== Background and release ==
On May 15, 2025, SM Entertainment revealed in its annual plan that Aespa was scheduled to release a single album in June 2025. On June 5, it was announced that the single album, Dirty Work, would be released on June 27. Four days later, the performance video for the title track, produced in collaboration with Apple and filmed entirely on an iPhone 16 Pro, was released. The promotional schedule was also released on the same day. On June 26, the music video teaser for the title track was released. The album was released alongside the music video for "Dirty Work" on June 27.

== Composition ==
Dirty Work includes four versions of the title track: the original, a version featuring Flo Milli, an English version, and an instrumental. The song is described as a dance track characterized by "synth bass" and lyrics conveying a "subjective message".

== Accolades ==
Awards and nominations
Award ceremony	Year	Category	Result	Ref.
Asian Pop Music Awards	2025	Best Dance Performance	Nominated	
Asian Pop Music Awards	2025	Record of the Year	Nominated	
Golden Disc Awards	2026	Best Digital Song	Won	
iHeartRadio Music Awards	2026	Favorite K-pop Collab	Nominated	
Korea Grand Music Awards	2025	Best Music 10	Won	
MAMA Awards	2025	Best Music Video	Nominated	
MAMA Awards	2025	Song of the Year	Longlisted	
Red Dot Design Award	2026	Product Design	Won	

On South Korean music programs, "Dirty Work" won four first-place awards.

Music program awards
Program	Date	Ref.
Inkigayo	July 6, 2025	
Inkigayo	July 13, 2025	
M Countdown	July 10, 2025	
Show! Music Core	July 12, 2025	

== Track listing ==
CD, digital download and streaming

1. "Dirty Work" – 3:00
2. "Dirty Work" (featuring Flo Milli) – 3:00
3. "Dirty Work" (English version) – 3:00
4. "Dirty Work" (instrumental) – 3:00

Digital download and streaming – remixes

1. "Dirty Work" (RayRay remix) – 3:21
2. "Dirty Work" (Arkins remix) – 3:16
3. "Dirty Work" (2Spade remix) – 2:57
4. "Dirty Work" – 3:00

== Credits and personnel ==
Credits adapted from the liner notes of Dirty Work.

Studio

- SM Big Shot Studio – recording, digital editing, mixing
- SM Yellow Tail Studio – recording
- SM Wavelet Studio – recording
- SM Droplet Studio – recording
- Sterling Sound – mastering

Personnel

- Aespa – vocals, background vocals
- Jeong Mul-hwa (Jamfactory) – lyrics
- Evan Blair – composition, arrangement
- Taylor Upsahl – composition, background vocals
- Elijah Noll – composition
- Imlay – composition, arrangement
- Saay – vocal directing, background vocals
- Lee Min-kyu – recording, digital editing, mixing
- Noh Min-ji – recording
- Kang Eun-ji – recording
- Kim Joo-hyun – recording
- Chris Gehringer – mastering

== Charts ==
=== Weekly charts ===
Weekly chart performance for "Dirty Work"
Chart (2025)	Peak position
Global 200 (Billboard)	5
Hong Kong (Billboard)	2
Indonesia (Billboard)	22
Japan Hot 100 (Billboard)	4
Japan Combined Singles (Oricon)	12
Malaysia (IFPI)	6
New Zealand Hot Singles (RMNZ)	15
Philippines Hot 100 (Billboard Philippines)	62
Singapore (RIAS)	8
South Korea (Circle)	2
South Korea Hot 100 (Billboard)	81
South Korean Albums (Circle)	1
Taiwan (Billboard)	1
Thailand (IFPI)	4
UK Indie Breakers (OCC)	12
UK Singles Sales (OCC)	34
UK Video Streaming (OCC)	67
Vietnam (IFPI)	5
Vietnam Hot 100 (Billboard)	11

=== Monthly charts ===
Monthly chart performance for "Dirty Work"
Chart (2025)	Position
South Korea (Circle)	4
South Korean Albums (Circle)	2

=== Year-end charts ===
Year-end chart performance for "Dirty Work"
Chart (2025)	Position
South Korea (Circle)	49
South Korean Albums (Circle)	17

== Certifications ==
Certifications for "Dirty Work"
Region	Certification	Certified units/sales
South Korea (KMCA) Physical	Million	1,000,000^{^}
^{^} Shipments figures based on certification alone.

== Release history ==
Release history for "Dirty Work"
Region	Date	Format	Label
South Korea	June 27, 2025	CD	SM; Kakao
Various	June 27, 2025	Digital download; streaming	SM; Kakao

== See also ==
- List of Circle Album Chart number ones of 2025
- List of Inkigayo Chart winners (2025)
- List of M Countdown Chart winners (2025)
- List of Show! Music Core Chart winners (2025)
