= Supernova Love =

Single by Ive and David Guetta
- Released: November 8, 2024
- Genre: EDM; dance-pop
- Length: 3:19
- Label: Virgin; KDM; E2W Group
- Songwriters: David Guetta; Jayover; Toby Green; Johannes Shore; Mike Hawkins; Daniel Kim; PollyAnna; Ryuichi Sakamoto; Cameron Warren
- Producers: David Guetta; Jjayover; Toby Green; Johannes Shore; Mike Hawkins; PollyAnna; Godboy

Ive singles chronology
"Crush" (2024)	"Supernova Love" (2024)	"Rebel Heart" (2025)

David Guetta singles chronology
"Forever Young" (2024)	"Supernova Love" (2024)	"Home" (2024)

Music video
- "Supernova Love" on YouTube

"Supernova Love" is a song by South Korean girl group Ive and French DJ David Guetta. It was released on November 8, 2024, by Virgin Records. The song was produced in collaboration with KDM Records' music platform The Collab X.

== Background and composition ==
In September 2024, Ive teased and performed the song as part of their encore on their Show What I Have World Tour in Japan.

In 2024, Kim Daniel, founder of KDM Records' music platform The Collab X, developed a new project which aimed to connect K-pop music and pop music of North America and Europe. To launch it Daniel involved K-pop girl group Ive and French DJ David Guetta in a collaborative single.

Daniel featured also as a producer and songwriter of the song "Supernova Love", with several authors and producers including Mike Hawkins and Guetta himself. The song sampled "Merry Christmas, Mr. Lawrence" by Japanese composer Ryuichi Sakamoto.

== Music video ==
The music video for the song, directed by Ivo Heffner, was released on November 8, 2024, through Ive's YouTube channel.

On December 24, 2024, Ive and David Guetta collaborated with the Japanese collectable toy brand Be@rbrick to make an exclusive music video for the song.

== Charts ==
=== Weekly charts ===
Weekly chart performance for "Supernova Love"
Chart (2024–2025)	Peak position
Belarus Airplay (TopHit)	24
CIS Airplay (TopHit)	8
Estonia Airplay (TopHit)	9
Global Excl. US (Billboard)	160
Japan (Japan Hot 100)	72
Kazakhstan Airplay (TopHit)	9
Latvia Airplay (TopHit)	1
Lithuania Airplay (TopHit)	53
Moldova Airplay (TopHit)	28
New Zealand Hot Singles (RMNZ)	10
Russia Airplay (TopHit)	5
Singapore (RIAS)	21
South Korea (Circle)	142
Ukraine Airplay (TopHit)	111
UK Singles Downloads (Official Charts)	69
UK Singles Sales (OCC)	78
US Hot Dance/Electronic Songs (Billboard)	14

=== Monthly charts ===
Monthly chart performance for "Supernova Love"
Chart (2024–2025)	Peak position
Belarus Airplay (TopHit)	33
CIS Airplay (TopHit)	9
Estonia Airplay (TopHit)	11
Kazakhstan Airplay (TopHit)	8
Latvia Airplay (TopHit)	1
Lithuania Airplay (TopHit)	48
Moldova Airplay (TopHit)	27
Russia Airplay (TopHit)	6

=== Year-end charts ===
2025 year-end chart performance for "Supernova Love"
Chart (2025)	Position
CIS Airplay (TopHit)	58
Kazakhstan Airplay (TopHit)	53
Latvia Airplay (TopHit)	33
Russia Airplay (TopHit)	41

=== Decade-end charts ===
20s Decade-end chart performance for "Supernova Love"
Chart (2020–2026)	Position
Latvia Airplay (TopHit)	110

== Release history ==
Release dates and formats for "Supernova Love"
Region	Date	Format(s)	Label(s)	Ref.
Various	November 8, 2024	Digital download; streaming	Virgin	
Italy	November 15, 2024	Radio airplay	EMI	
