= List of M Countdown Chart winners (2025) =

M Countdown Chart winners (2025)

The M Countdown Chart is a record chart on the South Korean Mnet television music program M Countdown. Every week, the show awards the best-performing single on the chart in the country during its live broadcast. The show has been hosted by Sung Han-bin, Sohee, and Myung Jae-hyun since January 2024. Sohee left as the MC on February 27, while Sung Han-bin and Myung Jae-hyun left on September 4.

== Scoring system ==
Period covered	Chart system				
Period covered	Broadcast	Digital sales	Physical album	Video views	Voting
January 5, 2024 – present	10%	50%	15%	10%	20% (10% pre-vote + 10% live-vote)

== Chart history ==
Key
†	Indicates a Triple Crown
‡	Indicates the highest score of the year
—	No show was held

Episode	Date	Artist	Song	Points	Ref.
—N/a	January 2	No Broadcast or Winner			
870	January 9	Stray Kids	"Walkin on Water"	8,656	
871	January 16	BoyNextDoor	"If I Say, I Love You"	9,500	
872	January 23	Ive	"Rebel Heart" †	8,147	
873	January 30	Ive	"Rebel Heart" †	—N/a	
874	February 6	Ive	"Rebel Heart" †	7,076	
875	February 13	Ive	"Attitude"	7,754	
876	February 20	Jennie & Dominic Fike	"Love Hangover"	7,765	
877	February 27	Jisoo	"Earthquake"	9,266	
878	March 6	G-Dragon	"Too Bad"	6,687	
879	March 13	G-Dragon	"Too Bad"	7,981	
880	March 20	Jennie	"Like Jennie" †	6,856	
881	March 27	Jennie	"Like Jennie" †	6,719	
882	April 3	Jennie	"Like Jennie" †	6,636	
883	April 10	J-Hope	"Mona Lisa"	7,638	
884	April 17	J-Hope	"Mona Lisa"	7,643	
885	April 24	NCT Wish	"Poppop"	9,208	
886	May 1	TWS	"Countdown"	9,461	
887	May 8	Meovv	"Hands Up"	—N/a	
888	May 15	Meovv	"Hands Up"	7,075	
889	May 22	BoyNextDoor	"I Feel Good"	8,590	
890	May 29	Jin	"Don't Say You Love Me"	7,669	
891	June 5	Seventeen	"Thunder"	10,567 ‡	
892	June 12	Enhypen	"Bad Desire (With or Without You)"	7,670	
893	June 19	Seventeen	"Thunder"	7,750	
894	June 26	J-Hope & GloRilla	"Killin' It Girl"	8,262	
895	July 3	AllDay Project	"Famous"	6,789	
896	July 10	Aespa	"Dirty Work"	8,199	
897	July 17	Blackpink	"Jump" †	7,792	
898	July 24	Blackpink	"Jump" †	6,942	
899	July 31	Blackpink	"Jump" †	—N/a	
900	August 7	Twice	"This Is For"	6,618	
901	August 14	NCT Dream	"Chiller"	7,535	
902	August 21	NCT Wish	"Surf"	8,364	
903	August 28	Stray Kids	"Ceremony"	10,000	
904	September 4	Stray Kids	"Ceremony"	9,659	
905	September 11	Zerobaseone	"Iconik"	7,917	
906	September 18	Aespa	"Rich Man" †	7,308	
907	September 25	Aespa	"Rich Man" †	Pts Not Revealed	
908	October 2	Aespa	"Rich Man" †	8,036	
—N/a	October 9	No Broadcast or Winner			
909	October 16	Babymonster	"We Go Up"	9,773	
910	October 23	Nmixx	"Blue Valentine"	9,958	
—N/a	October 30	No Broadcast or Winner			
—N/a	November 6	No Broadcast or Winner			
—N/a	November 13	No Broadcast or Winner			
—N/a	November 20	No Broadcast or Winner			
—N/a	November 27	No Broadcast or Winner			
—N/a	December 4	No Broadcast or Winner			
—N/a	December 11	No Broadcast or Winner			
—N/a	December 18	No Broadcast or Winner			
—N/a	December 25	No Broadcast or Winner			

== See also ==
- List of Inkigayo Chart winners (2025)
- List of Music Bank Chart winners (2025)
- List of Show Champion Chart winners (2025)
- List of Show! Music Core Chart winners (2025)
- List of The Show Chart winners (2025)
