= Rebel Heart (Ive song) =

Single by Ive

from the EP Ive Empathy
- Language: Korean
- Released: January 13, 2025
- Length: 3:08
- Label: Starship; Kakao; Columbia
- Composers: Emily Harbakk; Ryan S. Jhun; Thomas Gustafsson; Jimmy Jansson; Maia Wright; Jack Brady; Jordan Roman
- Lyricist: Nietzsche

Ive singles chronology
"Supernova Love" (2024)	"Rebel Heart" (2025)	"Attitude" (2025)

Music video
- "Rebel Heart" on YouTube

"Rebel Heart" is a song recorded by South Korean girl group Ive for their third Korean extended play Ive Empathy. It was released as the EP's first single on January 13, 2025, by Starship Entertainment. It was written by Nietzsche, composed by Emily Harbakk, Ryan S. Jhun, Thomas Gustafsson, Jimmy Jansson, Maia Wright, Jack Brady, and Jordan Roman, and arranged by Ryan S. Jhun, Gucci Caliente, and The Wavys.

"Rebel Heart" was a commercial success in South Korea and peaked at number one on the Circle Digital Chart for two weeks, becoming Ive's sixth number-one single on the chart, while also reaching the top ten in Taiwan. The song received several accolades, among them Song of the Year at the Asia Artist Awards and Korea Grand Music Awards. Ive promoted the song with live performances on various weekly South Korean music programs, including M Countdown, Music Bank, Show! Music Core, and Inkigayo.

== Background and release ==
On December 24, 2024, Starship Entertainment announced that Ive would be releasing their third Korean extended play titled Ive Empathy on February 3, 2025. It was also announced that "Rebel Heart" would be pre-released on January 13, 2025. On January 5, 2025, the concept trailer was released, followed by the concept film four days later. On January 12, the music video teaser was released. The song was released alongside its music video on January 13.

== Composition ==
"Rebel Heart" was written by Nietzsche, composed by Emily Harbakk, Ryan S. Jhun, Thomas Gustafsson, Jimmy Jansson, Maia Wright, Jack Brady, and Jordan Roman, and arranged by Ryan S. Jhun, Gucci Caliente, and The Wavys. It was described as a song with lyrics that "depicts the solidarity march of rebels".

== Commercial performance ==
"Rebel Heart" debuted at number ten on South Korea's Circle Digital Chart in the chart issue dated January 12–18, 2025, ascending to number four in the following week, and later peaked at number one. The song topped all real-time charts in South Korea and became their fifth song to achieve a perfect all-kill (PAK). In Japan, the song debuted at number 44 on the Billboard Japan Hot 100 in the chart issue dated January 22, 2025. On the Oricon Combined Singles Chart, the song debuted at number 50 in the chart issue dated January 27, 2025, ascending to number 44 in the following week.

In Singapore, "Rebel Heart" debuted at number 22 on the RIAS Official Singapore Chart in the chart issue dated January 17–23, 2025. The song also debuted at number 21 on the RIAS Official Singapore Regional Chart in the chart issue dated January 10–16, 2025, ascending to number eight in the following week. The song also debuted at number 22 on the Billboard Singapore Songs in the chart issue dated February 1, 2025. In Hong Kong, the song debuted at number 12 on the Billboard Hong Kong Songs in the chart issue dated February 1, 2025. In Taiwan, the song debuted at number seven on the Billboard Taiwan Songs in the chart issue dated February 1, 2025.

In United States, "Rebel Heart" debuted at number six on the Billboard World Digital Song Sales in the chart issue dated January 25, 2025. In United Kingdom, the song debuted at number 65 on the OCC's UK Singles Downloads Chart, and number 67 on the UK Singles Sales Chart in the chart issue dated January 17–23, 2025. Globally, the song debuted at number 97 on the Billboard Global 200, and number 51 on the Billboard Global Excl. U.S in the chart issue dated February 1, 2025.

== Promotion ==
Ive performed the song on four music programs in the first week of promotion: Mnet's M Countdown on January 16, KBS's Music Bank on January 17, MBC's Show! Music Core on January 18, and SBS's Inkigayo on January 19. In the second and final week of promotions, they performed on four music programs: M Countdown on January 23, Music Bank on January 24, Show! Music Core on January 25, and Inkigayo on January 26, where they won the first place in all appearances.

== Accolades ==
Awards and nominations for "Rebel Heart"
Award ceremony	Year	Category	Result	Ref.
Asia Artist Awards	2025	Song of the Year (Daesang)	Won	
Korea Grand Music Awards	2025	Grand Song (Daesang)	Won	
MAMA Awards	2025	Best Dance Performance – Female Group	Nominated	
MAMA Awards	2025	Global Trend Song	Won	
MAMA Awards	2025	Song of the Year (Daesang)	Nominated	

On South Korean music programs, "Rebel Heart" won eleven first place awards.

Music program awards for "Rebel Heart"
Program	Date	Ref.
Inkigayo	January 26, 2025	
Inkigayo	February 2, 2025	
Inkigayo	February 9, 2025	
M Countdown	January 23, 2025	
M Countdown	January 30, 2025	
M Countdown	February 6, 2025	
Music Bank	January 24, 2025	
Music Bank	February 14, 2025	
Show! Music Core	January 25, 2025	
Show! Music Core	February 8, 2025	
Show! Music Core	February 22, 2025	

=== Year-end lists ===
Year-end lists
Publication	List	Rank	Ref.
Idology	Top 20 Songs of 2025	Placed	

== Charts ==
=== Weekly charts ===
Weekly chart performance for "Rebel Heart"
Chart (2025)	Peak position
Global 200 (Billboard)	97
Hong Kong (Billboard)	12
Japan (Japan Hot 100)	44
Japan Combined Singles (Oricon)	50
Singapore (RIAS)	22
South Korea (Circle)	1
South Korea Hot 100 (Billboard)	97
Taiwan (Billboard)	7
UK Singles Downloads (Official Charts)	65
UK Singles Sales (OCC)	67
US World Digital Song Sales (Billboard)	6

=== Monthly charts ===
Monthly chart performance for "Rebel Heart"
Chart (2025)	Position
South Korea (Circle)	1

=== Year-end charts ===
Year-end chart performance for "Rebel Heart"
Chart (2025)	Position
South Korea (Circle)	8

== Release history ==
Release history for "Rebel Heart"
Region	Date	Format	Label
Various	January 13, 2025	Digital download; streaming	Starship; Kakao; Columbia

== See also ==
- List of Inkigayo Chart winners (2025)
- List of M Countdown Chart winners (2025)
- List of Music Bank Chart winners (2025)
- List of Show! Music Core Chart winners (2025)
