= Rich Man (Aespa song) =

- English version cover

Single by Aespa

from the EP Rich Man
- Language: English; Korean
- Released: September 5, 2025
- Genre: Dance
- Length: 3:17
- Label: SM; Kakao; Warner Japan; Capitol
- Composers: Cody Tarpley; Rachel Kanner; Ben Samama; Ryan Jhun
- Lyricist: Le'mon (153/Joombas)
- Producers: Cody Tarpley; Ryan Jhun

Aespa singles chronology
"Dirty Work" (2025)	"Rich Man" (2025)	"WDA (Whole Different Animal)" (2026)

Music video
- "Rich Man" on YouTube

"Rich Man" is a song recorded by South Korean girl group Aespa for their sixth extended play of the same name. It was released as the EP's lead single by SM Entertainment on September 5, 2025.

== Background and release ==
On August 4, 2025, SM Entertainment announced that Aespa would release "Rich Man" as the lead single from their extended play of the same name. A month later, the music video teaser was released. The song was released alongside its music video and the extended play on September 5.

On September 12, two English versions of the track were released with the first featuring Iranian-Dutch singer Sevdaliza and the second was performed solely by Aespa. On September 19, the remix version was released.

== Composition ==
"Rich Man" was described as a dance song characterized by a "rough electric guitar rhythm" with lyrics conveying "a message of confidence and independence". The song's lyrics were inspired by an interview with American singer Cher, in which she recalled her mother telling her to "settle down and marry a rich man", to which Cher famously replied, "Mom, I am a rich man".

== Accolades ==
Awards and nominations for "Rich Man"
Award ceremony	Year	Category	Result	Ref.
Asian Pop Music Awards	2025	Best Arranger (Note: Credited for Cody Tarpley, Rachel Kanner, Ben Samama, and Ryan Jhun)	Won	
Asian Pop Music Awards	2025	Top 20 Songs of the Year	Won	
Korea Grand Music Awards	2025	Best Dance Performance	Nominated	
Korea Grand Music Awards	2025	Best Music Video	Nominated	

On South Korean music programs, "Rich Man" won ten first-place awards.

Music program awards for "Rich Man"
Program	Date	Ref.
Inkigayo	September 21, 2025	
Inkigayo	September 28, 2025	
Inkigayo	October 12, 2025	
M Countdown	September 18, 2025	
M Countdown	September 25, 2025	
M Countdown	October 2, 2025	
Show Champion	September 17, 2025	
Show! Music Core	September 20, 2025	
Show! Music Core	September 27, 2025	
Show! Music Core	October 4, 2025	

== Track listing ==
Digital download and streaming – English version

1. "Rich Man" (featuring Sevdaliza) – 3:17
2. "Rich Man" (English version) – 3:17

Digital download and streaming – remixes

1. "Rich Man" (Yellow Claw remix) – 3:10
2. "Rich Man" (DPR Cream & H4rdy remix) – 3:17
3. "Rich Man" (DPR Artic remix) – 2:40
4. "Rich Man" – 3:17

== Credits and personnel ==
Credits adapted from Rich Man's liner notes.

Studio

- SM Wavelet Studio – recording, digital editing
- SM Droplet Studio – recording
- SM Concert Hall Studio – mixing
- Sterling Sound – mastering

Personnel

- SM Entertainment – executive producer
- Aespa – vocals, background vocals
- Le'mon (153/Joombas) – lyrics
- Cody Tarpley – producer, composition, arrangement, programming
- Rachel Kanner – composition, background vocals
- Ben Samama – composition
- Ryan Jhun – producer, composition, arrangement, programming
- Joowon – vocal directing
- Kang Eun-ji – recording, digital editing
- Kim Joo-hyun – recording
- Nam Koong-jin – mixing
- Chris Gehringer – mastering

== Charts ==
=== Weekly charts ===
Weekly chart performance for "Rich Man"
Chart (2025)	Peak position
Global 200 (Billboard)	30
Hong Kong (Billboard)	5
Japan Hot 100 (Billboard)	27
Japan Combined Singles (Oricon)	41
Malaysia (Billboard)	22
Malaysia International (RIM)	16
New Zealand Hot Singles (RMNZ)	14
Singapore (RIAS)	19
South Korea (Circle)	3
South Korea Hot 100 (Billboard)	43
Taiwan (Billboard)	2
Vietnam Hot 100 (Billboard)	86

=== Monthly charts ===
Monthly chart performance for "Rich Man"
Chart (2025)	Peak position
South Korea (Circle)	6

=== Year-end charts ===
Year-end chart performance for "Rich Man"
Chart (2025)	Position
South Korea (Circle)	95

== Release history ==
Release history for "Rich Man"
Region	Date	Format	Version	Label
Various	September 5, 2025	Digital download; streaming	Original	SM; Kakao
Various	September 12, 2025	Digital download; streaming	English	SM; Kakao
Various	September 19, 2025	Digital download; streaming	Remixes	SM; Kakao

== See also ==
- List of Inkigayo Chart winners (2025)
- List of M Countdown Chart winners (2025)
- List of Show Champion Chart winners (2025)
- List of Show! Music Core Chart winners (2025)
