= Ceremony (Stray Kids song) =

- Maximum Power Remixes cover

Single by Stray Kids

from the album Karma
- Language: Korean; English
- Released: August 22, 2025
- Studio: JYP (Seoul); Channie's "Room" (Seoul)
- Genre: EDM trap; baile funk
- Length: 2:44
- Label: JYP; Republic
- Composers: Bang Chan; Changbin; Han; Versachoi
- Lyricists: Bang Chan; Changbin; Han

Stray Kids singles chronology
"Hollow" (2025)	"Ceremony" (2025)	"In the Dark" (2025)

Music video
- "Ceremony" on YouTube

"Ceremony" is a song by South Korean boy band Stray Kids from their fourth Korean-language studio album Karma (2025). It was released as the album's lead single through JYP Entertainment and Republic Records on August 22, 2025. Musically, an EDM trap and baile funk track, the song speaks of the band's celebrations of the achievement and success. The futuristic-sport-themed accompanying music video features a cameo from professional gamer Faker.

== Background and release ==
Stray Kids announced their fourth Korean-language studio album Karma, set to be released on August 22, 2025. It accompanied by the sport-themed trailer depicting the members as a champion attending the "Karma Sports" competition in 2081, which spoiled some music. The band revealed the album's track list four days later, confirming "Ceremony" as its lead single, alongside the "Festival" and English versions, which was selected among the candidates "Creed", "In My Head", "Phoenix", and "Half Time". Two remix EPs, titled Maximum Power Remixes and Celebrate Remixes, were released on August 25 and August 29, respectively.

== Composition ==
"Ceremony" was written by Stray Kids' in-house production team 3Racha–Bang Chan, Changbin, and Han–and co-composed with Versachoi as a "gift" to their fans. Musically, the song is an EDM trap and baile funk track, expressing celebrations of the achievement and success forged through perseverance and hard work, as well as the journey of overcoming obstacles. Rooted on sports culture, the song likens the group as athletes fighting for hard-earned wins. In Intro: Karma video, Stray Kids described "Ceremony" as a celebration of their Dominate World Tour, which set various records, and returning to South Korea in triumph.

== Critical reception ==
Han Sung-hyun from IZM called "Ceremony" being "weak" for a celebratory song, noting "halfheartedly" repeats over a "bizarre" beat, and "tedious" raps, without an "engaging moment". The Korea Times's Inna Christine Cabel wrote that the song being "ease and nonchalant, lacking the usual bombast the band is known for."

Critics' rankings of "Ceremony"
Critic/Publication	Accolade	Rank	Ref.
Billboard Brasil	The 25 Best K-pop Songs of 2025	4	

== Commercial performance ==
Upon its release, "Ceremony" debuted at number 37 on the Circle Digital Chart in the week of August 17–23, 2025, with a two-day tracking period, and rose to number 17 the next week. In the United Kingdom, the song entered the UK Singles Chart at number 37, becoming the second top 40 on the chart. The song peaked at number 52 on the US Billboard Hot 100 dated September 6, 2025, Stray Kids' fourth entry. It also reached number three on the Hot Dance/Pop Songs and topped the Dance Digital Song Sales for the first time. On the Billboard Global 200, "Ceremony" landed at number ten, marking the group's third top ten entry, and collected 10,000 sales and 44 million streams. It also placed at number eight on the Global Excl. US with 5,000 sales and 35.9 million streams outside the US.

== Music video ==
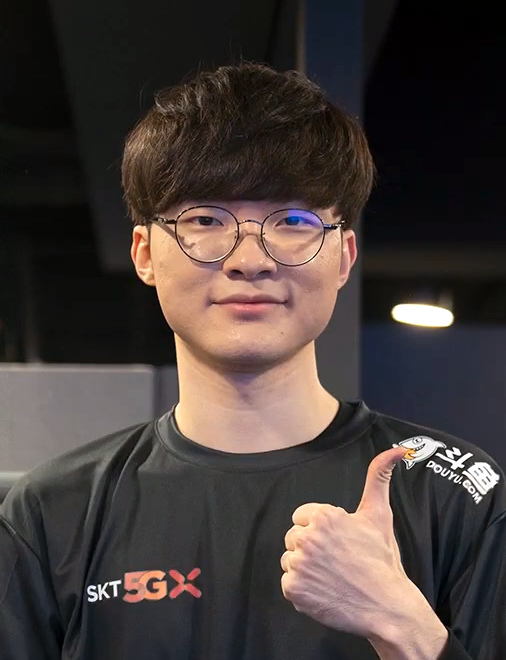
South Korean professional gamer Faker (pictured) cameos on the "Ceremony" music video.

An accompanying music video for "Ceremony", directed by Seong Won-mo and produced by Digipedi, premiered on August 22, 2025, concurrently with its parent album, preceded by two teaser videos. According to the group, the music video was inspired by stadiums where they previously held the concert, and "subversively expresses the image of multiple players as a team, giving their all in their respective positions toward the same goal." It became the band's 18th music video to reach 100 million views on YouTube.

The video depicts each member in various sports with some physically impossible moves in futuristic landscape: mixed martial arts, tennis, car and motorcycle racing, American football, association football, basketball, b-boying, baseball, and table tennis. The scene also alternates to the group dancing, choreographed by We Dem Boyz, in futuristic sets. At the end of the video, it cameos professional gamer Faker, who was previously mentioned on the band's song "Hall of Fame". He briefly appears as a gamer who controls all the sporting events in the video and doing his "shh" pose.

== Live performances ==
Since the release, Stray Kids promoted "Ceremony" at music programs Music Bank, Show! Music Core, Inkigayo, and M Countdown. The group also sung the song as part of Stray Kids' medley at the web show Killing Voice. The band performed the song outside South Korea for the first time in Macau at the 2025 The Fact Music Awards on September 25. "Ceremony" was also included on the setlist for the Dominate: Celebrate, held in October.

== Accolades ==
List of awards and nominations received by "Ceremony"
Ceremony	Year	Category	Result	Ref.
Asian Pop Music Awards	2025	Record of the Year	Nominated	
Korea Grand Music Awards	2025	Best Music Video	Nominated	
Korea Grand Music Awards	2025	Best Dance Performance	Nominated	
Korea Grand Music Awards	2025	Best Listener's Pick	Nominated	

Music program awards for "Ceremony"
Program	Date	Ref.
Inkigayo	August 31, 2025	
M Countdown	August 28, 2025	
M Countdown	September 4, 2025	
Music Bank	August 29, 2025	
Show Champion	September 3, 2025	
Show! Music Core	August 30, 2025	

== Track listing ==
- Digital download and streaming – Maximum Power Remixes
1. "Ceremony" – 2:44
2. "Ceremony" (Karma version) – 2:51
3. "Ceremony" (sped up version) – 2:19
4. "Ceremony" (slowed down version) – 3:04
5. "Ceremony" (instrumental version) – 2:44
- Digital download and streaming – Celebrate Remixes
1. "Ceremony" – 2:44
2. "Ceremony" (Hip Hip version; English version) – 2:38
3. "Ceremony" (Hooray version; English version) – 3:04
4. "Ceremony" (English version) – 2:44
5. "Ceremony" (Festival version; English version) – 2:52

== Credits and personnel ==
Personnel

- Stray Kids – lead vocals, background vocals
  - Bang Chan (3Racha) – lyrics, composition, arrangement, instruments, computer programming, vocal direction, recording, digital editing
  - Changbin (3Racha) – lyrics, composition, vocal direction
  - Han (3Racha) – lyrics, composition, vocal direction
- Versachoi – composition, arrangement, instruments, computer programming, vocal direction
- Eom Se-hee – recording
- Jang Woo-young – digital editing
- Manny Marroquin – mixing
- Chris Galland – mix engineering
  - Ben Rugg – assistant
- Kwon Nam-woo – mastering

Locations

- JYP Studios – recording
- Channie's "Room" – recording
- Larrabee Studios – mixing
- 821 Sound Mastering – mastering

== Charts ==
=== Weekly charts ===
Weekly chart performance for "Ceremony"
Chart (2025)	Peak position
Austria (Ö3 Austria Top 40)	36
Brazil Hot 100 (Billboard)	68
Canada Hot 100 (Billboard)	64
Czech Republic Singles Digital (ČNS IFPI)	17
El Salvador Anglo Airplay (Monitor Latino)	4
France (SNEP)	80
Germany (GfK)	38
Global 200 (Billboard)	10
Hong Kong (Billboard)	18
Ireland (IRMA)	69
Japan Hot 100 (Billboard)	28
Japan Combined Singles (Oricon)	19
Malaysia International (RIM)	19
Netherlands (Global Top 40)	24
Netherlands (Single Top 100)	65
New Zealand Hot Singles (RMNZ)	10
Portugal (AFP)	70
Russia Streaming (TopHit)	71
Singapore (RIAS)	19
Slovakia Singles Digital (ČNS IFPI)	77
South Korea (Circle)	17
Sweden Heatseeker (Sverigetopplistan)	4
Switzerland (Schweizer Hitparade)	62
Taiwan (Billboard)	7
UK Singles (Official Charts)	37
UK Indie (Official Charts)	6
US Billboard Hot 100	52
US Hot Dance/Pop Songs (Billboard)	3
US World Digital Song Sales (Billboard)	1

=== Monthly charts ===
Monthly chart performance for "Ceremony"
Chart (2025)	Peak position
Russia Streaming (TopHit)	80
South Korea (Circle)	85

=== Year-end charts ===
Year-end chart performance for "Ceremony"
Chart (2025)	Position
South Korea Download (Circle)	17
US Hot Dance/Pop Songs (Billboard)	24

== Release history ==
Release dates and formats
Region	Date	Format	Version	Label	Ref.
Various	August 22, 2025	Digital download; streaming	Original; Festival; English	JYP; Republic	
Various	August 24, 2025	Digital download	Original; Karma; sped up; slowed down; instrumental	JYP; Republic	
Various	August 25, 2025	Digital download; streaming	Maximum Power Remixes	JYP; Republic	
Various	August 29, 2025	Digital download; streaming	Celebrate Remixes	JYP; Republic	

== See also ==
- List of Inkigayo Chart winners (2025)
- List of M Countdown Chart winners (2025)
- List of Music Bank Chart winners (2025)
- List of Show Champion Chart winners (2025)
- List of Show! Music Core Chart winners (2025)
