= My First Love Song =

Single by KickFlip

from the EP My First Flip
- Language: Korean
- Released: September 22, 2025
- Length: 2:44
- Label: JYP
- Composers: DongHyeon, Rick Bridges, Trippy, gxxdkelvin
- Lyricists: DongHyeon, Rick Bridges, Trippy, gxxdkelvin

KickFlip singles chronology
"Freeze" (2025)	"My First Love Song" (2025)	"Twenty" (2026)

Music video
- "My First Love Song" on YouTube

"My First Love Song" is a song recorded by South Korean boy group KickFlip for their third extended play My First Flip. It was released by JYP Entertainment on September 22, 2025.

== Background and release ==
On September 9, Kick Flip first teased their upcoming third EP My First Flip with concept photos of each member, it was also revealed that the members participated in the work of a total of 7 songs, including the title song 'My First Love Song'. On September 17, JYP Entertainment announced that Amaru will be suspending his activities for the time being due to anxiety and won’t be participating in upcoming promotions for the EP.

== Composition ==
"My First Love Song" was written and composed by DongHyeon, Rick Bridges, Trippy and gxxdkelvin. The song is described as an uptempo dance song based on pop punk, blending powerful synth sounds with guitar riffs, it expresses the moment of confession with a pounding heart and conveys the fresh feelings of first love with the energy of KickFlip.

== Promotion ==
KickFlip first performed "My First Love Song" on Mnet M Countdown show on September 22, and 'Billboard Korea Busking Live with KickFlip' on September 23. KickFlip also performed on three other music programs in the first week of promotion: Music Bank on September 26 Show! Music Core, on September 27, and SBS's Inkigayo on September 28.

== Credits and personnel ==
Credits adapted from Tidal.

Personnel

- KickFlip – vocals
- Trippy, – lyrics, producer, composer, bass, drums, keyboards, synthezier, vocal arranger, writer
- DongHyeon – lyrics, composer, background vocals, writer
- Rick Bridges – lyrics, composer, sound editor, background vocals, vocal arranger, writer,
- gxxdkelvin – lyrics, composer, background vocals, vocal arranger, writer
- En Jin Yu – assistant mastering engineer
- JongLik GU, – atmos mixing engineer
- Odal Park, – atmos mixing engineer
- Namwoo Kwon – mastering engineer
- Adam Hawkins – mixing engineer
- Goo Hyejin – recording engineer
- Kim Gabsoo – recording engineer
- Lim Chanmi – recording engineer

== Charts ==
Weekly chart performance for "My First Love Song"
Chart (2025)	Peak positions
South Korea Download (Circle)	4

=== Monthly charts ===
Chart (September 2025)	Peak position
South Korea Download (Circle)	53

== Accolades ==
Music program awards for "My First Love Song"
Program	Date	Ref.
Show Champion	October 1, 2025	
Music Bank	October 3, 2025	

== Publication lists ==
Publication lists for "My First Love Song"
Critic/Publication	List	Rank	Ref.
Billboard	The 25 Best K-Pop Songs of 2025: Staff Picks	21	
The Hollywood Reporter	The 40 Best K-Pop Songs of 2025	14	

== Release history ==
Release history for "My First Love Song"
Region	Date	Format	Label
Various	September 22, 2025	Digital download; streaming	JYP
