= List of certified albums in South Korea =

The Korea Music Content Association (KMCA) was established in 2008, with the purpose of promoting the professional interests of its members, as well as being involved in anti-piracy. It introduced the first official South Korean music charts in 2010, and implemented record certifications in April 2018—only releases subsequent to January 1, 2018 would be eligible once they fulfilled the required thresholds. Releases prior to that date cannot receive certification.

Since 2018, 432 albums have been certified by the KMCA in South Korea. Got7's Eyes on You, NCT's NCT 2018 Empathy, and Wanna One's 0+1=1 (I Promise You) were the first to be certified, on May 5 of that year. The following month, Twice's What Is Love? (2018) became the first album by a female act to receive a certification. Blackpink's debut studio album The Album became the first by a girl group to receive Million certification in 2020, while their second studio album Born Pink became the first to receive Double Million certification in 2022. Baekhyun's third EP Bambi (2021) is the first album by a solo artist to receive Million certification, while Jisoo's first solo album Me (2023) is the first album by a female solo artist to do the same. Boy band Seventeen has the most-certified albums of any artist, with twenty-two.

As of September 2024, South Korea's highest-certified records are Map of the Soul: 7 (2020) by BTS, FML (2023) and Seventeenth Heaven (2023) by Seventeen, and 5-Star (2023) by Stray Kids. They were awarded Quintuple Million certification in November 2022, July 2023, August 2023, and September 2023 respectively, for selling over five million units each.

== Certification levels ==
Thresholds per award
| Platinum | 250,000 |
| 2× Platinum | 500,000 |
| 3× Platinum | 750,000 |
| Million | 1,000,000 |
| 2× Million (Note: Higher certifications (such as 3× Million) are also awarded.) | 2,000,000 |

== By units ==
=== 5× Million (5,000,000 Unit) ===
| Artist | Album | Release date | Certification date (Note: Only the date of the most recently awarded certification is shown.) |
|---|---|---|---|
| BTS | Map of the Soul: 7 | February 21, 2020 | November 10, 2022 |
| Seventeen | FML | April 24, 2023 | July 6, 2023 |
| Stray Kids | 5-Star | June 2, 2023 | August 10, 2023 |
| Seventeen | Seventeenth Heaven | October 23, 2023 | September 12, 2024 |

=== 4× Million (4,000,000 Unit) ===
| Artist | Album | Release date | Certification date |
|---|---|---|---|
| BTS | Map of the Soul: Persona | April 12, 2019 | May 6, 2021 |
| Stray Kids | Rock-Star | November 10, 2023 | February 8, 2024 |
| Seventeen | Face the Sun | May 27, 2022 | August 8, 2024 |
| BTS | Arirang | March 20, 2026 | May 7, 2026 |

=== 3× Million (3,000,000 Unit) ===
| Artist | Album | Release date | Certification date |
|---|---|---|---|
| BTS | Be | November 20, 2020 | March 11, 2021 |
| BTS | Love Yourself: Answer | August 24, 2018 | November 11, 2021 |
| BTS | Butter | May 21, 2021 | February 10, 2022 |
| BTS | Love Yourself: Tear | May 18, 2018 | July 7, 2022 |
| BTS | Proof | June 10, 2022 | August 11, 2022 |
| Stray Kids | Maxident | October 7, 2022 | December 8, 2022 |
| NCT Dream | ISTJ | July 17, 2023 | September 7, 2023 |
| Seventeen | 17 Is Right Here | April 29, 2024 | July 11, 2024 |
| Seventeen | Spill the Feels | October 14, 2024 | December 12, 2024 |
| Seventeen | Attacca | October 22, 2021 | July 10, 2025 |
| Stray Kids | Karma | August 22, 2025 | October 13, 2025 |
| Stray Kids | Ate | July 19, 2024 | April 9, 2026 |

=== 2× Million (2,000,000 Unit) ===
| Artist | Album | Release date | Certification date |
|---|---|---|---|
| NCT Dream | Hot Sauce | May 10, 2021 | July 8, 2021 |
| NCT 127 | Sticker | September 17, 2021 | November 11, 2021 |
| NCT Dream | Glitch Mode | March 28, 2022 | May 12, 2022 |
| Blackpink | Born Pink | September 16, 2022 | November 10, 2022 |
| TXT | The Name Chapter: Temptation | January 27, 2023 | March 9, 2023 |
| Aespa | My World | May 8, 2023 | July 6, 2023 |
| Zerobaseone | Youth in the Shade | July 10, 2023 | October 12, 2023 |
| TXT | The Name Chapter: Freefall | October 13, 2023 | December 7, 2023 |
| Jungkook | Golden | November 3, 2023 | January 11, 2024 |
| Ive | I've Mine | October 13, 2023 | December 7, 2023 |
| NCT Dream | Dream()scape | March 25, 2024 | May 9, 2024 |
| Stray Kids | Oddinary | March 18, 2022 | June 6, 2024 |
| Enhypen | Romance: Untold | July 12, 2024 | September 12, 2024 |
| Stray Kids | Hop | December 13, 2024 | February 6, 2025 |
| TXT | Minisode 2: Thursday's Child | May 9, 2022 | April 10, 2025 |
| Seventeen | Happy Burstday | May 26, 2025 | July 10, 2025 |
| Enhypen | Desire: Unleash | June 5, 2025 | August 7, 2025 |
| Stray Kids | Noeasy | August 23, 2021 | October 13, 2025 |

=== Million (1,000,000 Unit) ===
| Artist | Album | Release date | Certification date |
|---|---|---|---|
| Exo | Don't Mess Up My Tempo | November 2, 2018 | January 11, 2019 |
| Seventeen | Heng:garæ | June 22, 2020 | August 6, 2020 |
| Blackpink | The Album | October 6, 2020 | December 10, 2020 |
| NCT | Resonance Pt. 1 | October 12, 2020 | December 10, 2020 |
| Seventeen | Semicolon | October 19, 2020 | December 10, 2020 |
| NCT | Resonance Pt. 2 | November 23, 2020 | February 11, 2021 |
| Seventeen | An Ode | September 16, 2019 | June 10, 2021 |
| Baekhyun | Bambi | March 30, 2021 | June 10, 2021 |
| Exo | Don't Fight the Feeling | June 7, 2021 | August 12, 2021 |
| Seventeen | Your Choice | June 18, 2021 | August 12, 2021 |
| NCT Dream | Hello Future | June 28, 2021 | October 7, 2021 |
| Enhypen | Dimension: Dilemma | October 12, 2021 | December 9, 2021 |
| NCT | Universe | December 14, 2021 | February 10, 2022 |
| Lim Young-woong | Im Hero | May 2, 2022 | July 7, 2022 |
| NCT Dream | Beatbox | May 30, 2022 | August 11, 2022 |
| Baekhyun | Delight | May 25, 2020 | September 8, 2022 |
| Enhypen | Manifesto: Day 1 | July 4, 2022 | September 8, 2022 |
| Aespa | Girls | July 8, 2022 | September 8, 2022 |
| Itzy | Checkmate | July 15, 2022 | September 8, 2022 |
| Seventeen | Sector 17 | July 18, 2022 | September 8, 2022 |
| Ateez | The World EP.1: Movement | July 29, 2022 | September 8, 2022 |
| TXT | The Chaos Chapter: Fight or Escape | August 17, 2021 | October 6, 2022 |
| Ive | After Like | August 22, 2022 | October 6, 2022 |
| Twice | Between 1&2 | August 26, 2022 | October 6, 2022 |
| TXT | The Chaos Chapter: Freeze | May 31, 2021 | November 10, 2022 |
| NCT 127 | 2 Baddies | September 16, 2022 | November 10, 2022 |
| Jin | The Astronaut | October 28, 2022 | December 8, 2022 |
| Itzy | Cheshire | November 30, 2022 | January 12, 2023 |
| NCT Dream | Candy | December 19, 2022 | February 9, 2023 |
| NCT 127 | Ay-Yo | January 30, 2023 | April 6, 2023 |
| NewJeans | OMG | January 2, 2023 | May 11, 2023 |
| Twice | Ready to Be | March 10, 2023 | May 11, 2023 |
| Jimin | Face | March 24, 2023 | May 11, 2023 |
| Jisoo | Me | March 31, 2023 | May 11, 2023 |
| Ive | I've Ive | April 10, 2023 | June 8, 2023 |
| Agust D | D-Day | April 21, 2023 | June 8, 2023 |
| Le Sserafim | Unforgiven | May 2, 2023 | July 6, 2023 |
| Enhypen | Dark Blood | May 22, 2023 | July 6, 2023 |
| Ateez | The World EP.2: Outlaw | June 16, 2023 | August 10, 2023 |
| NewJeans | New Jeans | August 8, 2022 | September 7, 2023 |
| I-dle | I Feel | May 15, 2023 | September 7, 2023 |
| Exo | Exist | July 10, 2023 | September 7, 2023 |
| NewJeans | Get Up | July 21, 2023 | September 7, 2023 |
| Treasure | Reboot | July 28, 2023 | September 7, 2023 |
| TXT | Minisode1: Blue Hour | October 26, 2020 | October 12, 2023 |
| Itzy | Kill My Doubt | July 31, 2023 | October 12, 2023 |
| NCT | Golden Age | August 28, 2023 | October 12, 2023 |
| Le Sserafim | Antifragile | October 17, 2022 | November 9, 2023 |
| Riize | Get a Guitar | September 4, 2023 | November 9, 2023 |
| V | Layover | September 8, 2023 | November 9, 2023 |
| NCT 127 | Fact Check | October 6, 2023 | December 7, 2023 |
| Zerobaseone | Melting Point | November 6, 2023 | January 11, 2024 |
| Aespa | Drama | November 10, 2023 | January 11, 2024 |
| Enhypen | Orange Blood | November 17, 2023 | January 11, 2024 |
| Ateez | The World EP.Fin: Will | December 1, 2023 | January 11, 2024 |
| Ive | Love Dive | April 5, 2022 | April 11, 2024 |
| I-dle | 2 | January 29, 2024 | April 11, 2024 |
| Le Sserafim | Easy | February 19, 2024 | April 11, 2024 |
| Twice | With You-th | February 23, 2024 | April 11, 2024 |
| TXT | Minisode 3: Tomorrow | April 1, 2024 | June 6, 2024 |
| Enhypen | Border: Carnival | April 26, 2021 | July 11, 2024 |
| Ive | Ive Switch | April 29, 2024 | July 11, 2024 |
| Aespa | Armageddon | May 27, 2024 | July 11, 2024 |
| Ateez | Golden Hour: Part.1 | May 31, 2024 | July 11, 2024 |
| Riize | Riizing | June 17, 2024 | September 12, 2024 |
| NewJeans | Supernatural | June 21, 2024 | September 12, 2024 |
| Zerobaseone | Cinema Paradise | August 26, 2024 | October 10, 2024 |
| Baekhyun | Hello, World | September 6, 2024 | November 7, 2024 |
| Aespa | Whiplash | October 21, 2024 | January 9, 2025 |
| TXT | The Star Chapter: Sanctuary | November 4, 2024 | January 9, 2025 |
| Enhypen | Romance: Untold -Daydream- | November 11, 2024 | January 9, 2025 |
| NCT Dream | Dreamscape | November 11, 2024 | January 9, 2025 |
| Ateez | Golden Hour: Part.2 | November 15, 2024 | January 9, 2025 |
| NewJeans | How Sweet | May 24, 2024 | April 10, 2025 |
| Ive | Ive Empathy | February 3, 2025 | April 10, 2025 |
| Zerobaseone | Blue Paradise | February 24, 2025 | April 10, 2025 |
| NCT Wish | Poppop | April 14, 2025 | June 12, 2025 |
| BoyNextDoor | No Genre | May 13, 2025 | July 10, 2025 |
| Riize | Odyssey | May 19, 2025 | July 10, 2025 |
| Aespa | Dirty Work | June 27, 2025 | August 8, 2025 |
| TXT | The Star Chapter: Together | July 21, 2025 | September 11, 2025 |
| Ive | Ive Secret | August 25, 2025 | October 13, 2025 |
| Treasure | Love Pulse | September 1, 2025 | November 7, 2025 |
| Zerobaseone | Never Say Never | September 1, 2025 | November 7, 2025 |
| NCT Wish | Color | September 1, 2025 | November 7, 2025 |
| Aespa | Rich Man | September 5, 2025 | November 7, 2025 |

=== 3× Platinum (750,000 Unit) ===
| Artist | Album | Release date | Certification date |
|---|---|---|---|
| Wanna One | 0+1=1 (I Promise You) | March 19, 2018 | May 10, 2018 |
| Exo | Obsession | November 27, 2019 | January 9, 2020 |
| NCT 127 | Neo Zone | March 6, 2020 | May 7, 2020 |
| NCT 127 | Favorite | October 25, 2021 | December 9, 2021 |
| Enhypen | Dimension: Answer | January 10, 2022 | April 7, 2022 |
| Treasure | The Second Step: Chapter One | February 15, 2022 | April 7, 2022 |
| Twice | Formula of Love: O+T=＜3 | November 1, 2021 | May 12, 2022 |
| Stray Kids | Christmas EveL | November 29, 2021 | May 12, 2022 |
| Aespa | Savage | October 5, 2021 | November 11, 2022 |
| I-dle | I Love | October 17, 2022 | December 8, 2022 |
| Red Velvet | The ReVe Festival 2022 - Birthday | November 28, 2022 | January 12, 2023 |
| Ateez | Zero: Fever Part.3 | September 13, 2021 | February 9, 2023 |
| Nmixx | Expérgo | March 20, 2023 | May 11, 2023 |
| Stray Kids | In Life | September 14, 2020 | July 6, 2023 |
| Lisa | Lalisa | September 10, 2021 | August 10, 2023 |
| Nmixx | A Midsummer Nmixx's Dream | July 11, 2023 | September 9, 2023 |
| Rosé | R | March 12, 2021 | December 7, 2023 |
| NCT 127 | Be There for Me | December 27, 2023 | February 8, 2024 |
| Stray Kids | Go Live | June 17, 2020 | April 11, 2024 |
| Enhypen | Border: Day One | November 30, 2020 | April 11, 2024 |
| Nmixx | Fe3O4: Break | January 15, 2024 | June 6, 2024 |
| Kim Ho-joong | A Life | April 4, 2024 | June 6, 2024 |
| Blackpink | Kill This Love | April 23, 2019 | July 11, 2024 |
| Zerobaseone | You Had Me at Hello | May 13, 2024 | July 11, 2024 |
| NCT 127 | Walk | July 15, 2024 | September 12, 2024 |
| Le Sserafim | Crazy | August 30, 2024 | October 10, 2024 |
| BoyNextDoor | 19.99 | September 9, 2024 | November 7, 2024 |
| Jin | Happy | November 15, 2024 | January 9, 2025 |
| Twice | Strategy | December 6, 2024 | February 6, 2025 |
| BoyNextDoor | How? | April 15, 2024 | March 6, 2025 |
| Plave | Caligo Pt.1 | February 3, 2025 | April 10, 2025 |
| Treasure | Pleasure | March 7, 2025 | May 8, 2025 |
| I-dle | We Are | May 19, 2025 | July 10, 2025 |
| Jennie | Ruby | March 7, 2025 | August 7, 2025 |
| NCT Dream | Go Back to the Future | July 14, 2025 | September 11, 2025 |
| Twice | This Is For | July 11, 2025 | October 13, 2025 |

=== 2× Platinum (500,000 Unit) ===
| Artist | Album | Release date | Certification date |
|---|---|---|---|
| Wanna One | 1÷x=1 (Undivided) | June 4, 2018 | August 9, 2018 |
| Wanna One | 1¹¹=1 (Power of Destiny) | November 19, 2018 | January 11, 2019 |
| Exo | Love Shot | December 13, 2018 | March 7, 2019 |
| BTS | BTS World: Original Soundtrack | June 28, 2019 | August 8, 2019 |
| Baekhyun | City Lights | July 10, 2019 | September 12, 2019 |
| Kang Daniel | Color on Me | July 25, 2019 | September 12, 2019 |
| X1 | Emergency: Quantum Leap | August 27, 2019 | October 10, 2019 |
| NCT Dream | Reload | April 29, 2020 | June 11, 2020 |
| NCT 127 | Neo Zone: The Final Round | May 19, 2020 | August 6, 2020 |
| Twice | More & More | June 2, 2020 | August 6, 2020 |
| Iz*One | Oneiric Diary | June 15, 2020 | August 6, 2020 |
| Exo-SC | 1 Billion Views | July 13, 2020 | September 10, 2020 |
| Seventeen | You Made My Dawn | January 21, 2019 | October 8, 2020 |
| Kim Ho-joong | We Are Family | September 23, 2020 | November 12, 2020 |
| SuperM | Super One | September 25, 2020 | January 7, 2021 |
| NCT | NCT 2018 Empathy | March 14, 2018 | March 11, 2021 |
| Twice | Eyes Wide Open | October 26, 2020 | April 8, 2021 |
| Ateez | Zero: Fever Part.2 | March 1, 2021 | July 8, 2021 |
| Twice | Taste of Love | June 11, 2021 | August 12, 2021 |
| The Boyz | Thrill-ing | August 9, 2021 | October 7, 2021 |
| The Boyz | Maverick | November 12, 2021 | January 6, 2022 |
| Itzy | Crazy in Love | September 24, 2021 | February 10, 2022 |
| Twice | Feel Special | September 23, 2019 | March 10, 2022 |
| SM Town | 2021 Winter SM Town: SMCU Express | December 27, 2021 | April 7, 2022 |
| Red Velvet | The ReVe Festival 2022 - Feel My Rhythm | March 21, 2022 | May 12, 2022 |
| NCT Dream | We Boom | July 26, 2019 | July 7, 2022 |
| Got7 | Got7 | May 23, 2022 | July 7, 2022 |
| Young Tak | MMM | July 4, 2022 | September 8, 2022 |
| Kim Ho-joong | Panorama | July 27, 2022 | September 8, 2022 |
| Twice | Fancy You | April 22, 2019 | November 10, 2022 |
| TXT | The Dream Chapter: Eternity | May 18, 2020 | November 10, 2022 |
| Nayeon | Im Nayeon | June 24, 2022 | November 10, 2022 |
| Nmixx | Entwurf | September 19, 2022 | November 10, 2022 |
| RM | Indigo | December 2, 2022 | January 12, 2023 |
| Twice | What Is Love? | April 9, 2018 | March 9, 2023 |
| Blackpink | Square Up | June 15, 2018 | March 9, 2023 |
| TXT | The Dream Chapter: Magic | October 21, 2019 | April 6, 2023 |
| Le Sserafim | Fearless | May 2, 2022 | April 6, 2023 |
| Treasure | The Second Step: Chapter Two | October 4, 2022 | April 6, 2023 |
| BSS | Second Wind | February 6, 2023 | April 6, 2023 |
| Lee Chan-won | One | February 20, 2023 | April 6, 2023 |
| Nmixx | Ad Mare | February 22, 2022 | June 8, 2023 |
| NCT DoJaeJung | Perfume | April 17, 2023 | June 8, 2023 |
| Seventeen | FML (Weverse) | April 24, 2023 | June 8, 2023 |
| Twice | Summer Nights | July 10, 2018 | July 6, 2023 |
| Ive | Eleven | December 1, 2021 | August 10, 2023 |
| Seventeen | You Make My Day | July 16, 2018 | September 7, 2023 |
| NCT Dream | ISTJ (Nemo) | July 17, 2023 | September 7, 2023 |
| Young Tak | Form | August 1, 2023 | October 12, 2023 |
| Jihyo | Zone | August 18, 2023 | October 12, 2023 |
| J-Hope | Jack in the Box (Hope Edition) | August 18, 2023 | October 12, 2023 |
| V | Layover (Weverse) | September 8, 2023 | November 9, 2023 |
| Hwang Yeong-woong | Fall and Yearning | October 30, 2023 | January 11, 2024 |
| Red Velvet | Chill Kill | November 13, 2023 | January 11, 2024 |
| Jungkook | Golden (Weverse) | November 3, 2023 | February 8, 2024 |
| NewJeans | New Jeans (Weverse) | August 8, 2022 | March 7, 2024 |
| Itzy | Born to Be | January 8, 2024 | March 7, 2024 |
| BoyNextDoor | Why.. | September 4, 2023 | April 11, 2024 |
| I-dle | 2 (POCA) | January 29, 2024 | April 11, 2024 |
| Twice | Yes or Yes | November 5, 2018 | June 6, 2024 |
| Lee Chan-won | Bright | April 4, 2024 | June 6, 2024 |
| Yuqi | Yuq1 | April 23, 2024 | June 6, 2024 |
| RM | Right Place, Wrong Person | May 24, 2024 | July 11, 2024 |
| Jeonghan X Wonwoo | This Man | June 17, 2024 | August 8, 2024 |
| TWS | Summer Beat! | June 24, 2024 | August 8, 2024 |
| I-dle | I Sway | July 8, 2024 | September 12, 2024 |
| Enhypen | Romance: Untold (Weverse) | July 12, 2024 | September 12, 2024 |
| Jimin | Muse | July 19, 2024 | September 12, 2024 |
| Seventeen | Seventeenth Heaven (Weverse) | October 23, 2023 | October 10, 2024 |
| Babymonster | Babymons7er (Nemo) | April 1, 2024 | October 10, 2024 |
| Nmixx | Fe3O4: Stick Out | August 19, 2024 | October 10, 2024 |
| Plave | Asterum: 134-1 | February 27, 2024 | November 7, 2024 |
| Young Tak | SuperSuper | September 3, 2024 | November 7, 2024 |
| Hwang Yeong-woong | On Your Side | October 15, 2024 | December 12, 2024 |
| Itzy | Gold | October 15, 2024 | December 12, 2024 |
| Babymonster | Drip (Nemo) | November 1, 2024 | January 9, 2025 |
| Rosé | Rosie | December 6, 2024 | February 6, 2025 |
| TXT | The Dream Chapter: Star | March 4, 2019 | March 6, 2025 |
| G-Dragon | Übermensch | February 25, 2025 | April 10, 2025 |
| Rosé | Hot | March 14, 2025 | May 8, 2025 |
| The Boyz | Unexpected | March 17, 2025 | May 8, 2025 |
| Nmixx | Fe3O4: Forward | March 17, 2025 | May 8, 2025 |
| TWS | Try with Us | April 21, 2025 | June 12, 2025 |
| G-Dragon | Übermensch (Nemo) | February 25, 2025 | July 10, 2025 |
| Jin | Echo | May 16, 2025 | July 10, 2025 |
| Baekhyun | Essence of Reverie | May 19, 2025 | July 10, 2025 |
| Ateez | Golden Hour: Part.3 (POCA) | November 15, 2024 | August 7, 2025 |
| Stray Kids | Clé: Levanter | December 9, 2019 | September 11, 2025 |
| Mark | The Firstfruit | April 7, 2025 | September 11, 2025 |
| Cortis | Color Outside the Lines | September 8, 2025 | November 7, 2025 |

=== Platinum (250,000 Unit) ===
| Artist | Album | Release date | Certification date |
|---|---|---|---|
| Got7 | Eyes on You | March 12, 2018 | May 10, 2018 |
| Exo-CBX | Blooming Days | April 10, 2018 | June 8, 2018 |
| NU'EST W | Who, You | June 25, 2018 | November 8, 2018 |
| Got7 | Present: You | September 17, 2018 | November 8, 2018 |
| NCT 127 | Regular-Irregular | October 12, 2018 | December 6, 2018 |
| Got7 | Spinning Top | May 20, 2019 | July 11, 2019 |
| NCT 127 | We Are Superhuman | May 24, 2019 | July 11, 2019 |
| Monsta X | Take.2 We Are Here | February 18, 2019 | July 11, 2019 |
| Exo-SC | What a Life | July 22, 2019 | September 12, 2019 |
| Iz*One | Heart*Iz | April 1, 2019 | October 10, 2019 |
| NU'EST | Happily Ever After | April 29, 2019 | December 12, 2019 |
| Super Junior | Time Slip | October 14, 2019 | December 12, 2019 |
| Got7 | Call My Name | November 4, 2019 | January 9, 2020 |
| Iz*One | Bloom*Iz | February 17, 2020 | April 9, 2020 |
| Kang Daniel | Cyan | March 24, 2020 | May 7, 2020 |
| Suho | Self-Portrait | March 30, 2020 | June 11, 2020 |
| Got7 | Dye | April 20, 2020 | June 11, 2020 |
| Iz*One | Color*Iz | October 29, 2018 | July 9, 2020 |
| Monsta X | Fantasia X | May 26, 2020 | July 9, 2020 |
| Blackpink | How You Like That: Special Edition | July 17, 2020 | September 10, 2020 |
| Ateez | Zero: Fever Part.1 | July 29, 2020 | September 10, 2020 |
| Kang Daniel | Magenta | August 3, 2020 | October 8, 2020 |
| The Boyz | Chase | September 21, 2020 | November 12, 2020 |
| Monsta X | Fatal Love | November 2, 2020 | January 7, 2021 |
| Jonghyun | Poet | Artist | January 23, 2018 | February 11, 2021 |
| Got7 | Breath of Love: Last Piece | November 30, 2020 | February 11, 2021 |
| Kai | Kai | November 30, 2020 | February 11, 2021 |
| Iz*One | One-reeler / Act IV | December 7, 2020 | February 11, 2021 |
| Kim Ho-joong | The Classic Album I - My Favorite Arias | December 17, 2020 | February 11, 2021 |
| Kim Ho-joong | The Classic Album II - My Favorite Songs | December 18, 2020 | February 11, 2021 |
| NCT Dream | We Go Up | September 3, 2018 | March 11, 2021 |
| Treasure | The First Step: Chapter One | August 7, 2020 | March 11, 2021 |
| Treasure | The First Step: Treasure Effect | January 11, 2021 | March 11, 2021 |
| Shinee | Don't Call Me | February 22, 2021 | April 8, 2021 |
| WayV | Kick Back | March 10, 2021 | May 6, 2021 |
| Super Junior | The Renaissance | March 16, 2021 | May 6, 2021 |
| IU | Lilac | March 25, 2021 | May 6, 2021 |
| Astro | All Yours | April 5, 2021 | June 10, 2021 |
| Kang Daniel | Yellow | April 13, 2021 | June 10, 2021 |
| Itzy | Guess Who | April 30, 2021 | June 10, 2021 |
| NCT | Resonance Pt. 2 (KiT) | December 14, 2020 | June 10, 2021 |
| Stray Kids | Clé 1: Miroh | March 25, 2019 | August 12, 2021 |
| IU | Love Poem | November 18, 2019 | August 12, 2021 |
| Treasure | The First Step: Chapter Two | September 18, 2020 | August 12, 2021 |
| Monsta X | One of a Kind | June 1, 2021 | August 12, 2021 |
| Seventeen | Special Album 'Director's Cut' | February 5, 2018 | September 9, 2021 |
| Monsta X | Take.1 Are You There? | October 22, 2018 | September 9, 2021 |
| NCT Dream | Hello Future (KiT) | June 28, 2021 | September 9, 2021 |
| D.O. | Empathy | July 26, 2021 | September 9, 2021 |
| Red Velvet | Queendom | August 16, 2021 | October 7, 2021 |
| Astro | Switch On | August 2, 2021 | October 7, 2021 |
| Monsta X | Follow: Find You | October 28, 2019 | November 11, 2021 |
| Monsta X | No Limit | November 19, 2021 | January 6, 2022 |
| Treasure | The First Step: Chapter Three | November 6, 2020 | February 10, 2022 |
| Kai | Peaches | November 30, 2021 | February 10, 2022 |
| Ateez | Zero: Fever Epilogue | December 10, 2021 | February 10, 2022 |
| Itzy | Not Shy | August 17, 2020 | March 10, 2022 |
| Kep1er | First Impact | January 3, 2022 | March 10, 2022 |
| Stray Kids | I Am You | October 22, 2018 | May 12, 2022 |
| Red Velvet | The ReVe Festival: Finale | December 23, 2019 | June 9, 2022 |
| Red Velvet – Irene & Seulgi | Monster | July 6, 2020 | June 9, 2022 |
| Monsta X | Shape of Love | April 26, 2022 | June 9, 2022 |
| Stray Kids | Clé 2: Yellow Wood | June 19, 2019 | July 7, 2022 |
| Astro | Drive to the Starry Road | May 16, 2022 | July 7, 2022 |
| Stray Kids | I Am Who | August 6, 2018 | August 11, 2022 |
| STAYC | Young-Luv.com | February 21, 2022 | August 11, 2022 |
| Kep1er | Doublast | June 20, 2022 | August 11, 2022 |
| Stray Kids | I Am Not | March 26, 2018 | September 8, 2022 |
| NCT | Resonance Pt. 1 (KiT) | October 28, 2020 | September 8, 2022 |
| I-dle | I Never Die | March 14, 2022 | September 8, 2022 |
| J-Hope | Jack in the Box (Weverse) | July 15, 2022 | September 8, 2022 |
| STAYC | We Need Love | July 19, 2022 | September 8, 2022 |
| Girls' Generation | Forever 1 | August 8, 2022 | October 6, 2022 |
| The Boyz | Be Aware | August 16, 2022 | October 6, 2022 |
| NCT 127 | Regulate | November 27, 2018 | November 10, 2022 |
| Red Velvet | The ReVe Festival: Day 1 | June 19, 2019 | November 10, 2022 |
| Kep1er | Troubleshooter | October 13, 2022 | December 8, 2022 |
| NCT Dream | Candy (SMC) | December 19, 2022 | February 9, 2023 |
| SM Town | 2022 Winter SM Town: SMCU Palace | December 26, 2022 | February 9, 2023 |
| Ateez | Spin Off: From the Witness | December 30, 2022 | February 9, 2023 |
| Twice | The Year of "Yes" | December 13, 2018 | March 9, 2023 |
| I-dle | I Burn | January 11, 2021 | March 9, 2023 |
| Seventeen | Face the Sun (Weverse) | June 3, 2022 | March 9, 2023 |
| NewJeans | OMG (Weverse) | January 2, 2023 | March 9, 2023 |
| Monsta X | Reason | January 9, 2023 | March 9, 2023 |
| TXT | The Name Chapter: Temptation (Weverse) | January 27, 2023 | March 9, 2023 |
| STAYC | Teddy Bear | February 14, 2023 | April 6, 2023 |
| The Boyz | Be Awake | February 20, 2023 | April 6, 2023 |
| Cravity | Master: Piece | March 6, 2023 | May 11, 2023 |
| Jimin | Face (Weverse) | March 24, 2023 | May 11, 2023 |
| I-dle | I Feel (POCA) | May 16, 2023 | August 10, 2023 |
| Taeyong | Shalala | June 5, 2023 | August 10, 2023 |
| Ateez | The World EP.2: Outlaw (MINIRECORD) | June 16, 2023 | August 10, 2023 |
| Shinee | Hard | June 26, 2023 | August 10, 2023 |
| P1Harmony | Harmony: All In | June 8, 2023 | September 7, 2023 |
| Exo | Exist (SMC) | July 14, 2023 | September 7, 2023 |
| NCT Dream | ISTJ (SMC) | July 21, 2023 | September 7, 2023 |
| NewJeans | Get Up (Weverse) | July 21, 2023 | September 7, 2023 |
| The Boyz | Phantasy Pt. 1: Christmas in August | August 7, 2023 | October 12, 2023 |
| STAYC | Teenfresh | August 16, 2023 | October 12, 2023 |
| Plave | Asterum: The Shape of Things to Come | August 24, 2023 | October 12, 2023 |
| Cravity | Sun Seeker | September 11, 2023 | November 9, 2023 |
| Evnne | Target: Me | September 19, 2023 | November 9, 2023 |
| WayV | On My Youth | November 1, 2023 | January 11, 2024 |
| Enhypen | Orange Blood (Weverse) | November 17, 2023 | January 11, 2024 |
| The Boyz | Phantasy Pt. 2: Sixth Sense | November 20, 2023 | January 11, 2024 |
| Ateez | The World EP.Fin: Will (MINIRECORD) | December 1, 2023 | January 11, 2024 |
| Xikers | House of Tricky: How to Play | August 2, 2023 | March 7, 2024 |
| Taemin | Guilty | October 30, 2023 | March 7, 2024 |
| TWS | Sparkling Blue | January 22, 2024 | March 7, 2024 |
| IU | The Winning | February 20, 2024 | April 11, 2024 |
| Taeyong | Tap | February 26, 2024 | April 11, 2024 |
| Cravity | Evershine | February 26, 2024 | April 11, 2024 |
| NCT Wish | Wish | March 4, 2024 | May 9, 2024 |
| The Boyz | Phantasy Pt. 3: Love Letter | March 18, 2024 | May 9, 2024 |
| Illit | Super Real Me | March 25, 2024 | May 9, 2024 |
| J-Hope | Hope on the Street Vol. 1 | March 29, 2024 | May 9, 2024 |
| Babymonster | Babymons7er | April 1, 2024 | June 6, 2024 |
| Doyoung | Youth | April 22, 2024 | June 6, 2024 |
| BoyNextDoor | Who! | May 30, 2024 | June 6, 2024 |
| Jennie | Solo | November 15, 2018 | July 11, 2024 |
| Seventeen | Seventeenth Heaven (KiT) | October 23, 2023 | July 11, 2024 |
| Plave | Asterum: 134-1 (POCA) | February 27, 2024 | July 11, 2024 |
| Seventeen | 17 Is Right Here (Weverse) | April 29, 2024 | July 11, 2024 |
| Zerobaseone | You Had Me at Hello (POCA) | May 13, 2024 | July 11, 2024 |
| Enhypen | Memorabilia | May 13, 2024 | July 11, 2024 |
| WayV | Give Me That | June 3, 2024 | August 8, 2024 |
| Nayeon | Na | June 14, 2024 | August 8, 2024 |
| Jeonghan X Wonwoo | This Man (Weverse) | June 17, 2024 | August 8, 2024 |
| NCT Wish | Songbird | July 1, 2024 | September 12, 2024 |
| Stray Kids | Mixtape | January 8, 2018 | October 10, 2024 |
| Babymonster | BabyMons7er | April 1, 2024 | October 10, 2024 |
| NewJeans | How Sweet (Weverse) | May 24, 2024 | October 10, 2024 |
| Jaehyun | J | August 26, 2024 | October 10, 2024 |
| Chanyeol | Black Out | August 28, 2024 | October 10, 2024 |
| Tzuyu | Aboutzu | September 6, 2024 | November 7, 2024 |
| Riize | Riizing: Epilogue | September 19, 2024 | November 7, 2024 |
| P1Harmony | Sad Song | September 20, 2024 | November 7, 2024 |
| NCT Wish | Steady | September 24, 2024 | November 7, 2024 |
| NCT Wish | Steady (Nemo) | September 24, 2024 | November 7, 2024 |
| Seventeen | Spill the Feels (Weverse) | October 14, 2024 | December 12, 2024 |
| Seventeen | Spill the Feels (KiT) | October 14, 2024 | December 12, 2024 |
| Illit | I'll Like You | October 21, 2024 | December 12, 2024 |
| Visionary Vision | Performante | October 23, 2024 | December 12, 2024 |
| The Boyz | Trigger | October 28, 2024 | December 12, 2024 |
| Babymonster | Drip | November 1, 2024 | December 12, 2024 |
| Ateez | Golden Hour: Part.2 (POCA) | November 15, 2024 | January 9, 2025 |
| WayV | Frequency | November 25, 2024 | January 9, 2025 |
| TWS | Last Bell | November 25, 2024 | January 9, 2025 |
| Irene | Like a Flower | November 26, 2024 | January 9, 2025 |
| Oneus | Trickster | May 17, 2022 | February 6, 2025 |
| Cravity | Find the Orbit | December 5, 2024 | February 6, 2025 |
| BSS | Teleparty | January 8, 2025 | March 6, 2025 |
| KickFlip | Flip It, Kick It! | January 20, 2025 | March 6, 2025 |
| TXT | The Name Chapter: Freefall (Weverse) | October 13, 2023 | April 10, 2025 |
| Plave | Caligo Pt.1 (POCA) | February 3, 2025 | April 10, 2025 |
| Jisoo | Amortage | February 14, 2025 | April 10, 2025 |
| Hearts2Hearts | The Chase | February 24, 2025 | April 10, 2025 |
| Park Ji-hyeon | Ocean | January 13, 2025 | May 8, 2025 |
| Yeji | Air | March 10, 2025 | May 8, 2025 |
| Hoshi X Woozi | Beam | March 10, 2025 | May 8, 2025 |
| P1Harmony | Duh! | May 8, 2025 | July 10, 2025 |
| TripleS | Assemble25 | May 12, 2025 | July 10, 2025 |
| Riize | Odyssey (SMC) | May 19, 2025 | July 10, 2025 |
| KickFlip | Kick Out, Flip Now! | May 26, 2025 | July 10, 2025 |
| Enhypen | Desire: Unleash (Weverse) | June 5, 2025 | August 7, 2025 |
| Doyoung | Soar | June 9, 2025 | August 7, 2025 |
| Itzy | Girls Will Be Girls | June 9, 2025 | August 7, 2025 |
| Illit | Bomb | June 16, 2025 | August 7, 2025 |
| Cravity | Dare to Crave | June 23, 2025 | August 7, 2025 |
| BTS | 2025 BTS Festa: Capsule Album Vol.1 (SMC) | June 27, 2025 | August 7, 2025 |
| Super Junior | Super Junior25 | July 8, 2025 | September 11, 2025 |
| WayV | Big Bands | July 18, 2025 | September 11, 2025 |
| BTS | Permission to Dance on Stage – Live | July 18, 2025 | September 11, 2025 |
| The Boyz | A;Effect | July 28, 2025 | September 11, 2025 |
| Plave | Asterum (POCA) | April 4, 2023 | October 13, 2025 |
| Meovv | My Eyes Open VVide | May 12, 2025 | October 13, 2025 |
| Idntt | Unevermet (Cosmo) | August 11, 2025 | October 13, 2025 |
| Stray Kids | Karma (Nemo) | August 22, 2025 | October 13, 2025 |
| Monsta X | The X | September 1, 2025 | November 7, 2025 |
| Haechan | Taste | September 8, 2025 | November 7, 2025 |
| Idid | I did it. | September 15, 2025 | November 7, 2025 |
| Yuqi | Motivation | September 16, 2025 | November 7, 2025 |

== See also ==
- List of best-selling albums in South Korea
- List of certified songs in South Korea
- List of music recording certifications
