= NCT Wish discography =

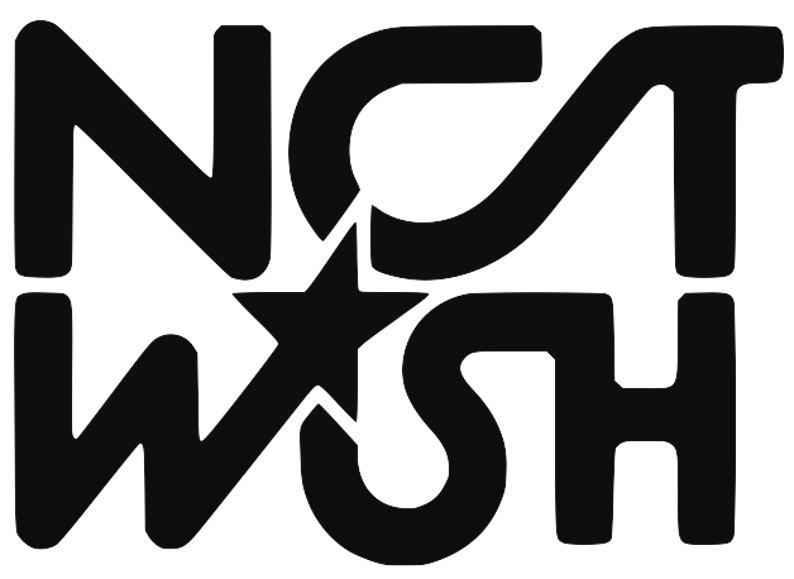
- NCT Wish's official logo
- Studio albums: 2
- EPs: 5
- Single albums: 2
- Singles: 16
- Promotional singles: 1
- Soundtrack appearances: 1

Japanese-Korean boy group NCT Wish has released two studio albums, five extended plays, two single albums, sixteen singles, one promotional single, and one soundtrack. A sub-unit of the Korean boy group NCT, NCT Wish first released the digital single "Hands Up" as a pre-debut release under the name NCT New Team in December 2023.

NCT Wish made their official debut in Japan and South Korea simultaneously in February 2024, with the single "Wish". "Wish" was released as a physical maxi single in Japan, and as the lead track for the single album of the same name in South Korea. The Japanese version of "Wish" debuted at number 3 on the Oricon Singles Chart and received a gold certification with at least 100,000 copies sold, while its Korean single album debuted on top of the Circle Album Chart and received a platinum certification with at least 250,000 copies sold.

Their first studio album and first Japanese-language album, Wishful, was released in November 2024. Their second studio album and first Korean album, Ode to Love, was released April 20, 2026.

== Studio albums ==
=== Japanese studio albums ===
List of Japanese studio albums, showing selected details, selected chart positions, and sales figures
Title	Details	Peak chart positions		Sales
Title	Details	JPN	JPN Hot	Sales
Wishful	Released: November 27, 2024; Label: SM, Avex; Formats: CD, digital download, streaming	2	4	JPN: 95,393

=== Korean studio albums ===
List of Korean studio albums, showing selected details, selected chart positions, and sales figures
Title	Details	Peak chart positions			Sales
Title	Details	JPN	JPN Hot	KOR	Sales
Ode to Love	Released: April 20, 2026; Label: SM; Formats: CD, digital download, streaming	5	9	1	KOR: 1,878,696; JPN: 9,271

== Extended plays ==
=== Japanese extended plays ===
List of Japanese extended plays, showing selected details, selected chart positions, sales figures, and certifications
Title	Details	Peak chart positions		Sales	Certifications
Title	Details	JPN	JPN Hot	Sales	Certifications
Wishlist	Released: January 14, 2026; Label: SM, Avex; Formats: CD, digital download, streaming	2	3	JPN: 100,848	RIAJ: Gold (phy.)

=== Korean extended plays ===
List of Korean extended plays, showing selected details, selected chart positions, sales figures, and certifications
Title	Details	Peak chart positions			Sales	Certifications
Title	Details	JPN	JPN Hot	KOR	Sales	Certifications
Steady	Released: September 24, 2024; Label: SM; Formats: CD, digital download, streaming	8	10	1	JPN: 20,381; KOR: 871,627	KMCA: Platinum; KMCA: Platinum (Nemo)
Poppop	Released: April 14, 2025; Label: SM; Formats: CD, digital download, streaming	5	18	1	JPN: 36,060; KOR: 1,353,419	KMCA: Million
Color	Released: September 1, 2025; Label: SM; Formats: CD, digital download, streaming	5	14	2	JPN: 40,554; KOR: 1,479,871	KMCA: Million
I Spy	Released: October 12, 2026; Label: SM; Formats: CD, digital download, streaming	5	8	1	JPN: 29,539; KOR: 1,643,248	

== Single albums ==
List of single albums, showing selected details, selected chart positions, sales figures, and certifications
Title	Details	Peak chart positions	Sales	Certifications
Title	Details	KOR	Sales	Certifications
Wish	Released: February 28, 2024; Label: SM; Formats: CD, digital download, streaming	1	KOR: 588,047	KMCA: Platinum
Songbird	Released: July 1, 2024; Label: SM; Formats: CD, digital download, streaming	1	KOR: 542,254	KMCA: Platinum

== Singles ==
=== Japanese singles ===
List of Japanese singles, showing year released, selected chart positions, sales figures, certifications, and name of the album
Title	Year	Peak chart positions			Sales	Certifications	Album
Title	Year	JPN	JPN Hot	KOR	Sales	Certifications	Album
"Hands Up"	2023	—	— (Note: "Hands Up" did not entered the Billboard Japan Hot 100, but it peaked at number 8 on the Heatseekers Songs chart.)	—	—N/a	—N/a	Wishful
"Wish"	2024	3	3	—	JPN: 77,672 (phy.)	RIAJ: Gold (phy.)	Wishful
"Songbird"	2024	3	4	—	JPN: 90,332 (phy.)	RIAJ: Gold (phy.)	Wishful
"Wishful Winter"	2024	—	—	—	—N/a	—N/a	Wishful
"Dreamcatcher"	2025	—	—	— (Note: "Dreamcatcher" did not chart on the Circle Digital Chart but peaked at number 184 on the Download Chart.)	—N/a	—N/a	Wishlist
"Hello Mellow"	2026	—	94	— (Note: "Hello Mellow" did not chart on the Circle Digital Chart but peaked at number 142 on the Download Chart.)	—N/a	—N/a	Wishlist
"Boy Meets Girl"	2026	2	19	175	JPN: 311,698 (phy.); JPN: 1,462 (dig.)	RIAJ: 2× Platinum (phy.)	Non-album singles
"Yo-i-Don!"	2026	2	3	— (Note: "Yo-i-Don!" did not chart on the Circle Digital Chart but peaked at number 67 on the Download Chart.)	JPN: 311,698 (phy.); JPN: 1,462 (dig.)	RIAJ: 2× Platinum (phy.)	Non-album singles
"—" denotes releases that did not chart or were not released in that region.

=== Korean singles ===
List of Korean singles, showing year released, selected chart positions, and name of the album
Title	Year	Peak chart positions			Album
Title	Year	KOR	JPN Hot	WW Excl. US	Album
"Wish"	2024	— (Note: "Wish" did not enter the Circle Digital Chart, but peaked at number 71 on the Circle Download Chart.)	—	—	Wish
"Songbird"	2024	196	—	—	Songbird
"Dunk Shot"	2024	131	—	—	Steady
"Steady"	2024	74	—	—	Steady
"Poppop"	2025	41	—	—	Poppop
"Surf"	2025	38	—	—	Color
"Color"	2025	55	—	—	Color
"Ode to Love"	2026	14	—	—	Ode to Love
"I Spy"	2026	25	74	158	I Spy
"—" denotes releases that did not chart or were not released in that region.

== Promotional singles ==
List of promotional singles, showing year released, selected chart positions, and name of the album
Title	Year	Peak chart positions	Album
Title	Year	KOR	Album
"Miracle"	2025	197	2025 SM Town: The Culture, the Future

== Soundtrack appearances ==
List of soundtracks, showing year released, selected chart positions, and name of the album
Title	Year	Peak chart positions	Album
Title	Year	KOR	Album
"Make You Shine"	2024	— (Note: "Make You Shine" did not chart on the Circle Digital Chart but peaked at number 152 on the Download Chart.)	Pokémon: Terastal Debut OST

== Other charted songs ==
List of other charted songs, showing year released, selected chart positions, and name of the album
Title	Year	Peak chart positions	Album
Title	Year	KOR	Album
"3 Minutes" (3분까진 필요 없어)	2024	— (Note: "3 Minutes" did not chart on the Circle Digital Chart but peaked at number 28 on the Download Chart.)	Steady
"On & On" (점점 더 더)	2024	— (Note: "On & On" did not chart on the Circle Digital Chart but peaked at number 41 on the Download Chart.)	Steady
"Supercute"	2024	— (Note: "Supercute" did not chart on the Circle Digital Chart but peaked at number 43 on the Download Chart.)	Steady
"Skate"	2024	— (Note: "Skate" did not chart on the Circle Digital Chart but peaked at number 42 on the Download Chart.)	Steady
"Hands Up" (Korean version)	2024	— (Note: "Hands Up (Korean version)" did not chart on the Circle Digital Chart but peaked at number 45 on the Download Chart.)	Steady
"Melt Inside My Pocket"	2025	93	Poppop
"Design"	2025	122	Poppop
"1000"	2025	106	Poppop
"Silly Dance"	2025	113	Poppop
"Still 3PM" (만약 네가 4시에 온다면)	2025	125	Poppop
"Baby Blue"	2025	117	Color
"Cheat Code"	2025	121	Color
"Videohood"	2025	134	Color
"Wichu"	2025	130	Color
"Reel-ationship" (고양이 릴스)	2025	123	Color
"Zone"	2026	— (Note: "Zone" did not chart on the Circle Digital Chart but peaked at number 180 on the Download Chart.)	Wishlist
"Good Morning"	2026	— (Note: "Good Morning" did not chart on the Circle Digital Chart but peaked at number 193 on the Download Chart.)	Wishlist
"Bubble Gum"	2026	— (Note: "Bubble Gum" did not chart on the Circle Digital Chart but peaked at number 198 on the Download Chart.)	Wishlist
"2.0 (Two Point O)"	2026	60	Ode to Love
"Sticky"	2026	42	Ode to Love
"Feel the Beat"	2026	82	Ode to Love
"Crush" (여우비)	2026	89	Ode to Love
"Street (2AM)"	2026	92	Ode to Love
"Glow Up"	2026	103	Ode to Love
"Everglow"	2026	107	Ode to Love
"Don't Say You Love Me"	2026	83	Ode to Love
"Voyage"	2026	104	Ode to Love
"We Own This Street"	2026	106	I Spy
"Upgrade"	2026	127	I Spy
"Super Major"	2026	130	I Spy
"Hubble Time"	2026	134	I Spy
"Like a Dream" (꿈결)	2026	107	I Spy
