= 2024 Korea Grand Music Awards =

2024 award ceremony

- Date: November 16–17, 2024
- Location: Inspire Arena, Incheon, South Korea
- Country: South Korea
- Hosted by: Nam Ji-hyun; Hanni (Day 1); Winter (Day 2)
- Organised by: Ilgan Sports

Highlights
- Most wins: Lee Chan-won (5)
- Website: kgma-is.com

Television/radio coverage
- Network: Kiswe; Wavve

The 2024 Korea Grand Music Awards (Korean: 2024 코리아 그랜드 뮤직 어워즈; RR: 2024 Koria geuraendeu myujik owojeu) was an awards ceremony held on November 16–17, 2024, at the Inspire Arena in Incheon, South Korea. It honour the best in South Korean music released between June 2023 and July 2024. The event was hosted by Nam Ji-hyun, Hanni, and Winter.

Lee Chan-won won five awards at the event, with Aespa following with four awards, including two Daesang.

== Criteria ==
The criteria for the awards were announced on the official website of the awards show.

Criteria for 2024 MAMA Awards nominations
Category	Jury Score	Record sales (Streaming/Album Sales)	IS Media Points	Online voting
Grand Prize (Note: Consists of Grand Artist, Grand Record, and Grand Song)	40%	60%		—N/a
Grand Honor's Choice	100%	—N/a		
Categories by Artist (Note: Consists of Best Group, Best Rock Ballad, Best Solo Artist, and Best Stage)	20%	45%		35%
Categories by Song (Note: Consists of Best Adult Contemporary, Best Artist 10, Best Band, Best Hip-Hop, Best Memory, Best OST, Best R&B, and Best Song 10)	50%	50%		—N/a
Best Selling Album & Most Streamed Song	—N/a	100%	—N/a	
Popularity Awards (Note: Consists of Caliverse Transcendent Artist of the Year, DIGGUS Digging Artist, Fan Vote Rookie, Lullua × Fancast Best Popularity, and Trend of the Year)	—N/a			100%
Special Awards (Note: Consists of Best Producer, IS Rising Star, IS Rookies, K-pop Global Artist, K-pop Global Rookies, K-pop Legendary Artist, and Photogenic)	—N/a		100%	—N/a
Data Sources: Circle Chart (Streaming/Album Sales); Caliverse, Diggus, and Fancast (Voting Data)

== Performers ==
The lineup was revealed gradually from October to November, with the final announcement made on November 10.

=== Day 1 (November 16) ===
Performances for Day 1
Artist(s)	Song(s) Performed
(G)I-dle	"Wife" "Klaxon"
Bibi	"Bam Yang Gang" "Derre"
D.O.	"Popcorn"
JD1	"Loop of Love" "Be Responsible"
Lee Mu-jin	"Episode" "Coming of Age Story"
Lee Young-ji	"Small Girl" (with D.O.) "Witch" "Smoke"
NewJeans	"Right Now" "Bubble Gum" "How Sweet" "Supernatural"
P1Harmony	"Sad Song" "Killin' It"
QWER	"Fake Idol" "T.B.H"
STAYC	"GPT" "Cheeky Icy Thang"
Taemin	"Heaven" "Sexy In the Air" "Guilty"
TVXQ!	"Rebel" "Rising Sun" "Keep Your Head Down" "Mirotic"
Yoo Hwe-seung	"I Think I Did"
Young Tak	"Form" "SuperSuper"
Zerobaseone	"Insomnia" "Sunday Ride" "Good So Bad"

=== Day 2 (November 17) ===
Performances for Day 2
Artist(s)	Song(s) Performed
Aespa	"Whiplash" "Supernova" "Armageddon"
Ateez	"Work" "Ice on My Teeth"
Class:y	"Psycho and Beautiful"
Day6	"Welcome to the Show" "Melt Down"
Fifty Fifty	"Cupid" "SOS" "Gravity"
JO1	"Where Do We Go" "Love Seeker"
Lee Chan-won	"A Travel to the Sky" "Masterpiece"
NCT Wish	"Wish" "Steady"
NiziU	"Believe"
Nowadays	"Why Not?"
Riize	"Boom Boom Bass" "Love 119" "Impossible"
Song Ga-in	"Mom Arirang"
Treasure	"I Want Your Love" "Mmm"
Unis	"Curious"
Winter	"Spark"
Yuqi	"Freak" "Radio (Dum Dum)"

== Winners and nominees ==
Winners and nominees are listed in alphabetical order. Winners are listed first and emphasized in bold.

=== Grand Prize ===
Grand Artist (Daesang)	Grand Performer (Daesang)
**NewJeans**	**Day6**
Grand Record (Daesang)	Grand Song (Daesang)
**(G)I-dle**	**Aespa – "Supernova"**
Grand Honor's Choice (Daesang)
**Aespa**; **Ateez**; **Zerobaseone**

=== Main awards ===
Best Artist 10	Best Song 10
**(G)I-dle**; **D.O.**; **Jeong Dong-won**; **Lee Young-ji**; **NewJeans**; **P1Harmony**; **STAYC**; **Taemin**; **Young Tak**; **Zerobaseone**; List of nominees: Aespa; Ateez; Babymonster; Baekhyun; BoyNextDoor; Cha Eun-woo; Cravity; Doyoung; Enhypen; Exo; Illit; IU; Ive; J-Hope; Jihyo; Jimin; JxW; Jungkook; Kep1er; Le Sserafim; Lee Chan-won; Nayeon; NCT; NCT 127; NCT Dream; NCT Wish; Nmixx; Plave; QWER; Red Velvet; Riize; RM; Seventeen; Song Ga-in; Stray Kids; Taeyong; The Boyz; Tomorrow X Together; Treasure; Twice; TWS; V; Wayv; Yuqi	**Aespa – "Supernova"**; **Ateez – "Crazy Form"**; **Day6 – "Welcome to the Show"**; **Lee Chan-won – "A Travel to the Sky"**; **Lim Young-woong – "Warmth"**; **NCT Dream – "Smoothie"**; **Riize – "Love 119"**; **Seventeen – "Maestro"**; **Stray Kids – "Chk Chk Boom"**; **Treasure – "King Kong"**; List of nominees: (G)I-dle – "Klaxon"; AKMU – "Love Lee"; Babymonster – "Sheesh"; Baekhyun – "Pineapple Slice"; Bibi – "Bam Yang Gang"; Crush – "Love You With All My Heart"; D.O. – "I Do"; Dynamic Duo & Lee Young-ji – "Smoke"; Enhypen – "XO (Only If You Say Yes)"; Fromis 9 – "Supersonic"; Illit – "Magnetic"; Itzy – "Cake"; Ive – "Heya"; IU – "Love Wins All"; Jaehyun – "Smoke"; Jennie – "You & Me"; Jeon Somi – "Fast Forward"; Jeong Dong-won – "Even If You Meet Someone Else"; Jimin – "Who"; Jungkook – "Seven" (feat. Latto); J-Hope – "I Wonder..." (with Jungkook); Le Sserafim – "Crazy"; Lee Chang-sub – "Heavenly Fate"; Lee Mu-jin – "Episode"; Lim Jae-hyun – "Rhapsody of Sadness"; NCT Wish – "Songbird"; NCT 127 – "Walk"; Nerd Connection – "If Only You Were Here"; NewJeans – "Super Shy"; Nmixx – "Dash"; Oh My Girl – "Summer Comes"; P1Harmony – "Killin' It"; Park Ji-hyeon – "I Like It When You Smile"; QWER – "T.B.H"; Red Velvet – "Chill Kill"; Roy Kim – "Let's Be Well"; RM – "LOST!"; Shinee – "Hard"; Shownu X Hyungwon – "Love Me a Little"; Song Ga-in – "Chilgapsan"; STAYC – "Bubble"; Taeyeon – "To. X"; The Boyz – "Watch It"; TWS – "Plot Twist"; V – "Slow Dancing"; Viviz – "Maniac"; Woody – "Flowers in the Desert"; Young Tak – "SuperSuper"; Zerobaseone – "Good So Bad"
Best Adult Contemporary	Best Band
**Lee Chan-won**; **Song Ga-in**; **Young Tak**; Cho Hang-jo; Cho Myung-Seop; Cho Young-nam; Ha Choon-hwa; Hong Ji-yun; Jang Min-ho; Jeon Yu-jin; Jeong Dong-won; Kim Tae-yeon; Kim Hee-Jae; Na Hoon-a; Na Tae-ju; Oh Yu-jin; Park Seo-jin	**Day6**; **QWER**; Band Nah; Eclipse; F.T. Island; Lucy; N.Flying; Nerd Connection; Plave; Silica Gel; Wave to Earth; Xdinary Heroes
Best Hip-Hop	Best R&B
**Lee Young-ji**; Ash Island; B.I; Beenzino; Be'O; Bobby; Choi Nak-ta; Crucial Star; Dok2; Dynamic Duo; E Sens; Ghvstclub; Han Yo-han; I.M; J-Hope; Kid Milli; Leellamarz; Paul Blanco; Penomeco; Plave; Sik-K; Stray Kids; Zico	**Bibi**; **D.O.**; Bang Ye-dam; Bol4; Car, the Garden; Chuu; Heize; Hynn; Jo Yu-ri; Kassy; KCM; Kim Feel; Kim Se-jong; Kyung Seo; Lee Jin-ah; Lee Seok-hoon; Sunwoo Jung-a; Wheein; Yonghwa
Best OST	Best Memory
**Yoo Hwe-seung – "I Think I Did"** (from Lovely Runner); Bang Ye-dam – "My All" (from Branding in Seongsu); BSS – "The Reasons of My Smiles" (from Queen of Tears); Crush – "Love You with All My Heart" (from Queen of Tears); DK – "Short Hair" (from Welcome to Samdal-ri); Eclipse – "Sudden Shower" (from Lovely Runner); Ha Sung-woon – "Gift" (from Lovely Runner); Jeong Dong-won – "Scattered Seasons" (from Moon in the Day); Jongho – "A Day" (from Lovely Runner); Jung Joon-il – "A Song for You" (from Twinkling Watermelon); Kang Min-kyung – "Lasting Like the Last Day" (from My Demon); Kassy – "Broke Up Today" (from Reunion Conseling); Lee Chang-sub – "Heavenly Fate" (from A Not So Fairytale); Lee Mu-jin & Sole – "She Is" (from My Lovely Sam Soon 2024); Lucy – "I'll Find You" (from Snap and Spark); MeloMance – "My Days" (from Castaway Diva); Miyeon – "The Painted on the Moonlight" (from My Dearest); N.Flying – "Star" (from Lovely Runner); Norazo – "Double of Nothing" (from Boyhood); Sandeul – "You're Living Like the Season" (from Castaway Diva); Standing Egg – "You're Precious" (from Twinkling Watermelon); Suho – "Forever" (from Gyeongseong Creature); Taeyeon – "Dream" (from Welcome to Samdal-ri); Winter – "The First Moment" (from Heartsping: Teenieping of Love); Yang Yo-seob – "Unforgettable Love" (from My Dearest); Yim Si-wan – "Take Me Home" (from Boyhood); Young Tak – "Go Your Own Way" (from Live Your Own Life); Zia – "Like Moon in the Day" (from Moon in the Day)	**Lee Mu-jin & Sole – "She Is"**; 10cm – "Tiramisu Cake"; Aespa – "Regret of the Times"; Big Mama – "Happy Me"; Gummy – "If You're Gonna Be Like This"; Heize – "Where Are You"; Huh Gak, Kim Hee-jae, Lee Jin-sung, Lee Mu-jin, Onestar & #Annyeong – "Old Song"; Jo Yu-ri – "All About You"; Joy & Big Naughty – "My Lips Like Warm Coffee"; Kassy – "Broke Up Today"; Kim Jae-hwan – "For Couples Who Just Met"; Kim Min-seok – "You We're Beautiful"; Kim Sung-kyu – "I Am Sorry, I Hate You"; Kwon Jin-ah – "You're Different"; Lee Chang-sub – "Heavenly Fate"; Lim Jae-hyun – "Rhapsody of Sadness"; MeloMance – "Between Love and Freindship"; Nerd Connection – "If I Have You Only"; Seo Eun-kwang – "The Man"; Shion – "Time Spent Walking Through Memories" (feat. 10cm); Solar – "Love Has Gone"; Yoo Hwe-seung – "I Think I Did"

=== Popularity awards ===
The categories for the popularity awards were announced in May 2024, with voting starting the same month and running until November 9. The voting process was divided into three phases: monthly voting from May to September 2024, the first and second rounds from September 12 to October 20, and the final round from October 22 to November 9. Voting was conducted through three apps: Caliverse, Diggus, and Fancast.

Trend of the Year – K-pop Group	Trend of the Year – K-pop Solo
**Unis**; List of nominees: (G)I-dle; 8turn; AB6IX; Aespa; Akmu; Apink; Ateez; Babymonster; Blackpink; BoyNextDoor; Cravity; Day6; Dreamcatcher; Enhypen; Exo; Fromis 9; Got7; Highlight; IKon; Illit; Infinite; Itzy; Ive; Kep1er; Le Sserafim; Mamamoo; Monsta X; NCT 127; NCT Dream; NewJeans; Nmixx; Plave; Red Velvet; Riize; Seventeen; Shinee; STAYC; Stray Kids; The Boyz; Tomorrow X Together; Treasure; TripleS; Twice; TWS; Wayv; Zerobaseone	**V**; List of nominees: Baekhyun; BamBam; Bibi; Bobby; Cha Eun-woo; Choi Ye-na; Chung Ha; D.O.; Hwasa; I.M; IU; Jennie; Jeon Somi; Jeong Se-woon; J-Hope; Jihyo; Jimin; Jisoo; Jo Yu-ri; Jungkook; Kai; Kang Daniel; Key; Kim Jae-hwan; Kim Se-jeong; Kwon Eun-bi; Kyuhyun; Lee Hi; Lee Chae-yeon; Lee Young-ji; Lim Hyun-sik; Lim Young-woong; Minho; Moonbyul; Nam Woo-hyun; Onew; Park Ji-hoon; Park Woo-jin; Ryeowook; Solar; Suga; Taeyang; Taemin; Taeyeon; Wendy; Wheein; Yesung
Trend of the Year – Trot Star	Trend of the Year – Trot Rookie
**Lee Chan-won**; List of nominees: Cho Myung-seop; Gaeun Eun; Hong ja; Hong Ji-yun; Hong Jin-young; Jang Minho; Jang Yoon-jeong; Jeong Dong-won; Jinsung; Jo Jung-min; Jung Mi-ae; Kang Hye-yeon; Kim Eui-young; Kim Hee-jae; Kim Soo-chan; Kim Tae-yeon; Kim Yang; Lim Young-woong; Na Tae-ju; Park Koon; Park Seo-jin; Park Hyun-bin; Shin Yu; Song Ga-in; Yang Ji-eun; Yang Ji-won; Yoon Soo-hyun; Young Tak	**Park Ji-hyeon**; List of nominees: An Seong-hoon; Bae A-hyun; Byeol Sa-rang; Choi Soo-ho; Enoch; Gong Hoon; Hwang Min-woo; Jeon Yu-jin; Jin Hae-seong; Jin-uk; Jung Seo-joo; Jung Se-ul; Kim Da-hyun; Kim Jung-yeon; Kim So-yeon; Lyn; Ma I-jin; Maria; Min Soo-hyun; Miss Kim; Na Sang-do; Na Yeong; Oh Yu-jin; Park Hye-sin; Park Min-su; Park Sung-on; Shin Se-ong; Son Tae-jin
CALIVERSE, Transcendent Artist of the Year	DIGGUS Digging Artist
**Young Tak**	**Lee Chan-won**
Fan Vote Rookie – Female	Fan Vote Rookie – Male
**NiziU**; Artms; Babymonster; Fifty Fifty; Illit; Kiss of Life; Loossemble; Unis; TripleS	**Riize**; ARrC; BoyNextDoor; Evnne; Fantasy Boys; JD1; Lun8; N.SSign; NCT Wish; Nexz; One Pact; TIOT; TWS; WHIB; Xikers
Lullua × Fancast Best Popularity
**Lee Chan-won**; **Taemin**

=== Special awards ===
Best Selling Album	Best Producer
**Seventeen – Seventeenth Heaven**	**Tak Young-jun (SM Entertainment)**
IS Rising Star	IS Rookies
**Fifty Fifty**; **Jeong Dong-won**; **NCT Wish**	**Nowadays**; **Unis**
K-pop Global Artist	K-pop Global Rookies
**JO1**; **NiziU**	**Me:I**
K-pop Legendary Artist	Most Streamed Song
**TVXQ!**	**Aespa – "Supernova"**
Best Group	Best Rock Ballad
**Riize**	**Lee Mu-jin**
Best Solo Artist	Best Stage
**Taemin**; **Yuqi**	**Treasure**
Photogenic
**Class:y**; **Seo Eve**

== Multiple awards ==
The following artist(s) received two or more awards:

Count	Artist(s)
5	Lee Chan-won
4	Aespa
3	Day6
3	Riize
3	Taemin
3	Young Tak
2	(G)I-dle
2	Ateez
2	D.O.
2	Jeong Dong-won
2	Lee Mu-jin
2	Lee Young-ji
2	NewJeans
2	NiziU
2	Seventeen
2	Treasure
2	Unis
2	Zerobaseone
