= The World EP.2: Outlaw =

2023 EP by Ateez

- Digital cover

EP by Ateez
- Released: June 16, 2023
- Genre: K-pop
- Length: 19:30
- Language: Korean
- Label: KQ; RCA; Legacy

Ateez chronology
Spin Off: From the Witness (2022)	The World EP.2: Outlaw (2023)	The World EP.Fin: Will (2023)

Singles from The World EP.2: Outlaw
- 1. "Bouncy (K-Hot Chilli Peppers)" Released: June 16, 2023

The World EP.2: Outlaw is the ninth extended play (EP) by South Korean boy band Ateez. It was released on June 16, 2023, through KQ Entertainment, RCA Records, and Legacy Recordings. It consists of six tracks, including the single "Bouncy (K-Hot Chilli Peppers)". The band will embark on a world tour in support of the EP, titled The Fellowship: Break the Wall. The single "Bouncy (K-Hot Chilli Peppers)" was certified Gold in Brazil (Pro-Música Brasil) for selling over 20,000 units.

== Background and themes ==
The EP is a continuation of the theme started with The World EP.1: Movement (2022), which "marked the beginning of a secret movement to cause a fissure in this controlled society". It contains themes of oppression and "the desire to break free from it".

Member Jongho stated that the group intended for the lead single, "Bouncy (K-Hot Chilli Peppers)", to have "fun vibes and energetic colors", which they demonstrated by incorporating gestures into their choreography for its video, including "flaking the pepper, grinding it and biting it". He also said, "For the other tracks, (we) can take on different concepts. This mini album, itself, is a variety. Musically, it is very diverse." USA Today stated that "This World" has "operatic, haunting tones" and "Outlaw" has a "hypnotic tempo".

== Critical reception ==
Year-end lists for The World EP.2: Outlaw
Critic/Publication	List	Rank	Ref.
Paste	The 20 Best K-pop Albums of 2023	15	

== Track listing ==
The World EP.2: Outlaw track listing
No.	Title	Lyrics	Music	Arrangement	Length
1.	"This World"	Eden; Ollounder; Buddy; Maddox; Peperoni; Oliv; Hongjoong; Mingi; Alex Karlsson	Eden; Ollounder; Buddy; Maddox; Peperoni; Oliv; Karlsson	Eden; Ollounder; Buddy; Maddox; Peperoni; Oliv	3:32
2.	"Dune"	Eden; Ollounder; Maddox; Peperoni; Oliv; Hongjoong; Mingi; Door	Eden; Ollounder; Maddox; Peperoni; Oliv; Door	Eden; Ollounder; Maddox; Peperoni; Oliv; Door	3:15
3.	"Bouncy (K-Hot Chilli Peppers)"	Eden; Ollounder; Buddy; Maddox; Peperoni; Oliv; Hongjoong; Mingi	Eden; Ollounder; Buddy; Maddox; Peperoni; Oliv; Karlsson	Eden; Ollounder; Buddy; Maddox; Peperoni; Oliv	3:07
4.	"Django"	Eden; Ollounder; Buddy; Maddox; Peperoni; Oliv; Hongjoong; Mingi; Door	Eden; Ollounder; Buddy; Maddox; Peperoni; Oliv; Door	Eden; Ollounder; Buddy; Maddox; Peperoni; Oliv; Door	3:11
5.	"Wake Up" (최면)	Eden; Ollounder; Buddy; Maddox; Peperoni; Oliv; Hongjoong; Mingi	Eden; Ollounder; Buddy; Maddox; Peperoni; Oliv	Eden; Ollounder; Buddy; Maddox; Peperoni; Oliv	3:06
6.	"Outlaw"	Eden; Ollounder; Maddox; Peperoni; Oliv; Hongjoong; Mingi; Leez; Dwayne	Eden; Ollounder; Maddox; Peperoni; Oliv; Leez; Dwayne	Eden; Ollounder; Maddox; Peperoni; Oliv; Leez; Dwayne	3:19
Total length:					19:30

== Charts ==
=== Weekly charts ===
Weekly chart performance for The World EP.2: Outlaw
Chart (2023)	Peak position
Belgian Albums (Ultratop Flanders)	3
Belgian Albums (Ultratop Wallonia)	10
Croatian International Albums (HDU)	5
Danish Albums (Hitlisten)	23
Dutch Albums (Album Top 100)	70
German Albums (Offizielle Top 100)	34
Hungarian Albums (MAHASZ)	12
Japanese Albums (Oricon)	1
Japanese Combined Albums (Oricon)	1
Japanese Hot Albums (Billboard Japan)	1
Lithuanian Albums (AGATA)	33
New Zealand Albums (RMNZ)	40
Polish Albums (ZPAV)	2
Scottish Albums (OCC)	6
South Korean Albums (Circle)	1
Swedish Albums (Sverigetopplistan)	34
Swiss Albums (Schweizer Hitparade)	59
UK Albums (OCC)	10
US Billboard 200	2
US World Albums (Billboard)	1

=== Monthly charts ===
Monthly chart performance for The World EP.2: Outlaw
Chart (2023)	Position
Japanese Albums (Oricon)	5
South Korean Albums (Circle)	3

=== Year-end charts ===
Year-end chart performance for The World EP.2: Outlaw
Chart (2023)	Position
Japanese Albums (Oricon)	57
Japanese Hot Albums (Billboard Japan)	56
South Korean Albums (Circle)	32
US World Albums (Billboard)	14

== Accolades ==
Year-end lists
Critic/Publication	List	Work	Rank	Ref.
Business Insider	The Best K-pop Songs of 2023, Ranked	"Bouncy (K-Hot Chilli Peppers)"	7	
Consequence	The 2023 K-Pop Yearbook	"Bouncy (K-Hot Chilli Peppers)"	Placed	
Dazed	The 50 Best K-pop Tracks of 2023	"Bouncy (K-Hot Chilli Peppers)"	16	
Grammy	15 K-Pop Songs That Took 2023 By Storm	"Bouncy (K-Hot Chilli Peppers)"	10	
NME	The 25 best K-pop songs of 2023	"Bouncy (K-Hot Chilli Peppers)"	15	
Paris Match	Top 10 K-Pop Songs of 2023	"Bouncy (K-Hot Chilli Peppers)"	1	
Teen Vogue	The Best K-Pop Music Videos of 2023	"Bouncy (K-Hot Chilli Peppers)"	Placed	

Music program awards
Song	Program	Date	Ref.
"Bouncy (K-Hot Chilli Peppers)"	The Show (SBS MTV)	June 20, 2023	
"Bouncy (K-Hot Chilli Peppers)"	Show Champion (MBC M)	June 21, 2023	
"Bouncy (K-Hot Chilli Peppers)"	Music Bank (KBS)	June 23, 2023	
"Bouncy (K-Hot Chilli Peppers)"	The Show (SBS MTV)	June 27, 2023	
"Bouncy (K-Hot Chilli Peppers)"	Music Bank (KBS)	June 30, 2023	

== Certifications ==
Certifications for The World EP.2: Outlaw
Region	Certification	Certified units/sales
South Korea (KMCA)	Million	1,000,000^{^}
South Korea (KMCA) Mini Record version	Platinum	250,000^{^}
^{^} Shipments figures based on certification alone.
