= Steady (EP) =

- Digital cover

EP by NCT Wish
- Released: September 24, 2024
- Genre: K-pop
- Length: 21:14
- Language: Korean
- Labels: SM; Kakao

NCT Wish chronology
Songbird (2024)	Steady (2024)	Wishful (2024)

NCT chronology
The Highest (2024)	Steady (2024)	Dreamscape (2024)

Singles from Steady
- 1. "Dunk Shot" Released: September 9, 2024; 2. "Steady" Released: September 24, 2024

Music videos
- "Dunk Shot" on YouTube "3 Minutes" on YouTube "Steady" on YouTube

Steady is the first Korean extended play and first overall by Japanese boy group NCT Wish, the Japanese-based unit of boy group NCT. It was released on September 24, 2024, through SM Entertainment and Kakao Entertainment. The EP comprises seven tracks, including two singles; "Dunk Shot" and the title track of the same name.

== Background and release ==
On August 27, 2024, SM Entertainment confirmed that NCT Wish will release new music at the end of September and are in the final stages of preparations. On September 2, the EP Steady was announced to be released on September 24, which will contain seven tracks, including the Korean version of their 2023 single "Hands Up". The album release will also be preceded by the lead single "Dunk Shot" on September 9. A music video for the track "3 Minutes" was released on September 16. The album was released on September 24, concurrently with the second single and title track "Steady".

== Promotion ==
In the lead up to the album's release, the group performed "Dunk Shot" on three South Korean music programs: Mnet's M Countdown on September 12, KBS's Music Bank on September 13, and MBC's Show! Music Core on September 14. Upon release, the group held a media showcase at Blue Square Mastercard Hall in Yongsan District, Seoul.

== Commercial performance ==
On September 23, prior to the album's release, it was reported that Steady had exceeded 800,000 pre-orders, surpassing the group's previous record of 630,000 pre-orders for Songbird.

== Track listing ==
Steady track listing
No.	Title	Lyrics	Music	Arrangement	Length
1.	"Steady"	Kenzie	Karen Poole; Georgia Ku; Lewis Jankel; Kenzie	Kenzie; No2zcat; Shift K3Y	2:59
2.	"3 Minutes" (3분까진 필요 없어; Sambunkkajin Pillyo Eopseo [lit. 'I Don't Need Three Minutes'])	Paprikaa; Brother Su; Strawberrybananaclub	Brother Su; Paprikaa	Strawberrybananaclub; Paprikaa	2:46
3.	"Dunk Shot"	Kim In-hyung (Jam Factory)	Avin (아빈); Slay (슬레이); 536; Opro	Slay; Avin; 536; Opro	2:59
4.	"On & On" (점점 더 더; Jeomjeom Deo Deo [lit. 'More and More'])	Somdef; August Rigo	Somdef; August Rigo; Flexindoor	Somdef; Flexindoor	3:03
5.	"Supercute"	3! (Lalala Studio)	Cleo Tighe; Rollo; Starsmith	Starsmith	2:51
6.	"Skate"	John Eun; John OFA Rhee	John Eun; No Identity; Oiaisle; Stella Jang; John OFA Rhee	John Eun; No Identity	3:19
7.	"Hands Up" (Korean version)	Kenzie	Kenzie; Ludvig Evers (Moonshine); Jonatan Gusmark (Moonshine); Adrian McKinnon	Moonshine	3:14
Total length:					21:14

== Credits and personnel ==
Credits adapted from the EP's liner notes.

Studio

- SM Wavelet Studio – recording (track 1), engineered for mix (track 1, 4)
- SM Dorii Studio – recording (track 2)
- SM LVYIN Studio – recording, digital editing, mixing (track 2)
- Sound Pool Studio – recording (track 3, 6), digital editing (track 3)
- SM Big Shot Studio – recording (track 6–7), digital editing, engineered for mix, mixing (track 6)
- SM SSAM Studio – recording, digital editing (track 7)
- Doobdoob Studio – digital editing (track 1)
- 77F Studio – digital editing (track 4)
- SM Yellow Tail Studio – digital editing (track 5), engineered for mix (track 2–3, 5)
- SM Blue Ocean Studio – mixing (track 1)
- SM Blue Cup Studio – mixing (track 3, 7)
- SM Concert Hall Studio – mixing (track 4)
- SM Starlight Studio – mixing (track 5)
- 821 Sound – recording (track 4–5), mastering (all tracks)

Personnel

- SM Entertainment – executive producer
- BoA – producer
- NCT Wish – vocals (all tracks)
  - Sion – background vocals (track 5–6)
  - Yushi – background vocals (track 1–2, 5)
  - Jaehee – background vocals (track 1, 5)
  - Ryo – background vocals (track 1, 5)
- Kenzie – producer, lyrics, composition, vocal directing (track 1, 7), arrangement (track 1), background vocals (track 7)
- Karen Poole – composition (track 1)
- Georgia Ku – composition (track 1)
- Lewis Jankel a.k.a. Shift K3Y – producer, composition, arrangement (track 1)
- No2zcat – arrangement (track 1)
- Paprikaa – producer, lyrics, composition, arrangement, vocal directing (track 2)
- Brother Su – lyrics, composition, vocal directing, background vocals (track 2)
- Strawberrybananaclub – producer, composition, arrangement, instrumentation (track 2)
- Kim In-hyung (Jam Factory) – lyrics (track 3)
- Avin – producer, composition, arrangement, vocal directing (track 3)
- Slay – producer, composition, arrangement, vocal directing, background vocals, bass (track 3)
- 536 – composition, arrangement, drums (track 3)
- Opro – composition, arrangement, guitar (track 3)
- Somdef – producer, lyrics, composition, arrangement, vocal directing, drums, bass, digital editing (track 4)
- August Rigo – lyrics, composition, background vocals (track 4)
- Flexindoor – producer, composition, arrangement, drums, bass, synthesizer (track 4)
- 3! (Lalala Studio) – lyrics (track 5)
- Cleo Tighe – composition (track 5)
- Rollo – composition (track 5)
- Starsmith – producer, composition, arrangement (track 5)
- John Eun – producer, lyrics, composition, arrangement, vocal directing, bass, guitar (track 6)
- John OFA Rhee – lyrics, composition (track 6)
- No Identity – producer, composition, arrangement, vocal directing, drums, synthesizer, programming (track 6)
- Oiaisle – composition, background vocals (track 6)
- Stella Jang – composition, background vocals (track 6)
- Jonatan Gusmark (Moonshine) – producer, composition, arrangement, instrumentation (track 7)
- Ludvig Evers (Moonshine) – producer, composition, arrangement, instrumentation (track 7)
- Adrian McKinnon – composition, background vocals (track 7)
- Jsong – vocal directing, background vocals (track 1)
- Andrew Choi – vocal directing, background vocals (track 4)
- Ven – vocal directing, background vocals (track 5)
- Xydo – background vocals (track 7)
- 0pang – piano, electric piano, synthesizer (track 3)
- Kang Eun-ji – recording (track 1), digital editing (track 7), engineered for mix (track 1, 4)
- Jeong Jae-won – recording (track 2)
- Lee Ji-hong – recording, digital editing, mixing (track 2)
- Jeong Ho-jin – recording (track 3, 6), digital editing (track 3)
- On Seong-yoon – recording (track 3)
- Kim Min-hee – recording (track 4–5)
- Lee Min-kyu – recording (track 6–7), digital editing, engineered for mix, mixing (track 6)
- Kim Joo-hyun – recording (track 7)
- Eugene Kwon – digital editing (track 1)
- Woo Min-jeong – digital editing (track 4)
- Noh Min-ji – digital editing (track 5), engineered for mix (track 2–3, 5)
- Kim Cheol-sun – mixing (track 1)
- Jung Eui-seok – mixing (track 3, 7)
- Nam Koong-jin – mixing (track 4)
- Jeong Yoo-ra – mixing (track 5)
- Kwon Nam-woo – mastering (all tracks)

== Charts ==
=== Weekly charts ===
Weekly chart performance for Steady
Chart (2024)	Peak position
Japanese Albums (Oricon)	8
Japanese Combined Albums (Oricon)	8
Japanese Hot Albums (Billboard Japan)	10
South Korean Albums (Circle)	1

=== Monthly charts ===
Monthly chart performance for Steady
Chart (2024)	Peak position
Japanese Albums (Oricon)	16
South Korean Albums (Circle)	5

=== Year-end charts ===
Year-end chart performance for Steady
Chart (2024)	Position
South Korean Albums (Circle)	60

== Certifications ==
Certifications for "Steady"
Region	Certification	Certified units/sales
South Korea (KMCA) Physical	Platinum	250,000^{^}
South Korea (KMCA) Nemo version	Platinum	250,000^{^}
^{^} Shipments figures based on certification alone.

== Release history ==
Release history for Steady
Region	Date	Format	Label
South Korea	September 24, 2024	CD	SM
Various	September 24, 2024	Digital download; streaming	SM
