= Spin Off: From the Witness =

- Digital cover

Single album by Ateez
- Released: December 30, 2022
- Length: 15:40
- Language: Korean
- Labels: KQ; RCA; Legacy
- Producers: Eden; Ollounder; Maddox; Peperoni; Oliv; Buddy; Neko; June One; Idiotape

Ateez chronology
The World EP. Paradigm (2022)	Spin Off: From the Witness (2022)	The World EP.2: Outlaw (2023)

Singles from Spin Off: From the Witness
- 1. "Halazia" Released: December 30, 2022

Spin Off: From the Witness is the first single album by South Korean boy band Ateez. It was released on December 30, 2022, through KQ Entertainment. The album consists of five tracks, including the lead single "Halazia".

== Track listing ==
Spin Off: From the Witness track listing
No.	Title	Lyrics	Music	Arrangement	Length
1.	"Halazia"	Eden; Ollounder; Maddox; Peperoni; Oliv; Buddy; Hongjoong; Mingi	Eden; Ollounder; Maddox; Peperoni; Oliv; Buddy; Leez; Neko	Eden; Ollounder; Maddox; Peperoni; Oliv; Buddy; Neko	3:17
2.	"Win" (June One remix)	Eden; Ollounder; Buddy; Leez; Hongjoong; Mingi	Eden; Ollounder; Buddy; Leez	June One	3:29
3.	"I'm the One" (Eden-ary remix)	Eden; Ollounder; Leez; Peperoni; Oliv; Hongjoong; Mingi	Eden; Ollounder; Buddy; Leez; Peperoni; Oliv	Ollounder; Peperoni; Oliv	3:14
4.	"Take Me Home" (Idiotape remix)	Eden; Leez; Ollounder; Hongjoong; Mingi	Eden; Leez; Ollounder; Oneflame	Idiotape	3:34
5.	"Outro: Blue Bird"		Eden; Ollounder; Buddy; Peperoni; Oliv; Maddox	Eden; Ollounder; Buddy; Peperoni; Oliv; Maddox	2:06
Total length:					15:40

== Charts ==
=== Weekly charts ===
Weekly chart performance for Spin Off: From the Witness
Chart (2023)	Peak position
Belgian Albums (Ultratop Flanders)	23
Belgian Albums (Ultratop Wallonia)	42
Croatian International Albums (HDU)	27
Finnish Physical Albums (Suomen virallinen lista)	8
Hungarian Albums (MAHASZ)	8
Japanese Albums (Oricon)	23
Japanese Digital Albums (Oricon)	35
Japanese Hot Albums (Billboard Japan)	90
South Korean Albums (Circle)	1
Swedish Albums (Sverigetopplistan)	43
US Billboard 200	7
US World Albums (Billboard)	1

=== Monthly charts ===
Monthly chart performance for Spin Off: From the Witness
Chart (2022)	Peak position
South Korean Albums (Circle)	4

=== Year-end charts ===
Year-end chart performance for Spin Off: From the Witness
Chart (2022)	Position
South Korean Albums (Circle)	55
South Korean Albums (Circle) POCA album	77

== Accolades ==
Music program awards for "Halazia"
Program	Date	Ref.
Music Bank	January 6, 2023	

== Certifications ==
Certifications for Spin Off: From the Witness
Region	Certification	Certified units/sales
South Korea (KMCA)	Platinum	250,000^{^}
^{^} Shipments figures based on certification alone.
