= Hands Up (NCT New Team song) =

Single by NCT New Team

from the album Wishful
- Language: Japanese
- B-side: "We Go!"
- Released: October 8, 2023
- Genre: J-pop
- Length: 3:14
- Label: Avex Trax
- Composers: Kenzie; Ludvig Evers; Jonatan Gusmark; Adrian McKinnon
- Lyricists: Kenzie; H. Toyosaki (Note: Japanese version only)

NCT Wish singles chronology
"Hands Up" (2023)	"Wish" (2024)

NCT singles chronology
"Fact Check" (2023)	"Hands Up" (2023)	"On My Youth" (2023)

Music video
- "Hands Up" on YouTube

"Hands Up" is a song recorded by Japanese boy group NCT Wish, the Japanese-based unit of boy group NCT, who were then promoting as NCT New Team. It was released as the group's pre-debut single digitally on October 8, 2023, and was released physically on December 20, 2023, to support the group's pre-debut showcase tour in late 2023 ahead of their debut in 2024. The single additionally contains the B-side track "We Go!". A music video for "Hands Up" was released on October 19.

== Background and release ==
On February 3, 2023, SM Entertainment revealed plans to debut a Japanese unit for NCT, then dubbed NCT Tokyo, to debut later in the year. The official lineup, put together via the reality show NCT: Lastart, was revealed on September 7, 2023, as NCT New Team.

The group held their first performance on September 9 and 10 as the opening act for NCT at NCT Nation: To the World, where they debuted the song "Hands Up." In October 2023, it was announced that the group would be releasing a pre-debut single on October 8, consisting of the songs "Hands Up" and "We Go".

A Korean version of the song was later included as the seventh track of the group's first EP Steady, released on September 24, 2024.

== Promotion ==
On the day of the album's release, the group began a pre-debut tour, which consisted of 28 performances across 10 cities in Japan.

== Track listing ==
"Hands Up" track listing
No.	Title	Lyrics	Music	Arrangement	Length
1.	"Hands Up"	Kenzie; H. Toyosaki	Kenzie; Ludvig Evers (Moonshine); Jonatan Gusmark (Moonshine); Adrian McKinnon	Moonshine	3:14
2.	"We Go!"	MEG.ME	Simon Janlöv; Daniel Caesar	Janlöv	3:02
Total length:					6:16

== Charts ==
Chart performance for "Hands Up"
Chart (2023)	Peak position
Japan Heatseekers (Billboard Japan)	8

== Release history ==
Release history for "Hands Up"
Region	Date	Format	Version	Label
Various	October 8, 2023	Digital download; streaming	Japanese	Avex
Various	September 24, 2024	Digital download; streaming	Korean	SM
