= Wishful =

- Digital cover

Studio album by NCT Wish
- Released: November 27, 2024
- Genre: J-pop
- Length: 40:51
- Language: Japanese
- Label: SM; Avex

NCT Wish chronology
Steady (2024)	Wishful (2024)	Poppop (2025)

NCT chronology
Frequency (2024)	Wishful (2024)	Poppop (2025)

Alternative cover
- Physical cover

Singles from Wishful
- 1. "Hands Up" Released: October 8, 2023; 2. "Wish" Released: February 28, 2024; 3. "Songbird" Released: June 25, 2024; 4. "Wishful Winter" Released: November 27, 2024

Wishful is the debut studio album by boy band NCT Wish, the Japan-based unit of boy group NCT. It was released digitally on November 27, 2024, followed by a physical release in Japan on December 25, through SM Entertainment and Avex Trax. Comprising thirteen tracks, the album is led by the single "Wishful Winter", and includes tracks from the group's previously released maxi singles – "Hands Up", "Wish" and "Songbird".

== Background and release ==
On October 8, 2024, it was announced through NCT's Japanese website that NCT Wish will be releasing their first Japanese studio album Wishful on December 25. The album will include their six previously released Japanese tracks in addition to seven new songs, including the full version of "NASA", which was originally released in shortened form in a January 2024 performance video.

Wishful was released to digital download and streaming services on November 27, 2024, along with the album's title track, "Wishful Winter", and its accompanying music video.

== Composition ==
The album's title track, "Wishful Winter" is described as a pop ballad with arpeggio piano, strings, and harmonies "reminiscent of bells". The song's lyrics reflect on the band "granting wishes on Christmas."

== Promotion ==
The band promoted the album with the "Log In" Asia tour. The tour began on November 3 in Ishikawa, continuing to several other cities in Japan throughout November and December. In 2025, the tour visited Seoul and other regions of Asia.

To commemorate the release of Wishful, a limited-time Christmas-themed collaboration project event was held between November 30 and December 25 at DiverCity Tokyo Plaza. The event consisted of a limited time shopping campaign with exclusive novelty items, the mall was adorned throughout the whole event to celebrate the release of the album. A Christmas tree was also placed as part of the event. On December 23, a release event named "NCT WISH WISHFUL Christmas party in DiverCity Tokyo Plaza ~Wishescome true~" took place in the shopping mall. The event attracted 5,000 fans. Riku, who had been on a health hiatus since October 2024 was absent from the event.

== Track listing ==
Wishful track listing
No.	Title	Lyrics	Music	Arrangement	Length
1.	"Wishful Winter"	D&H (Purple Night); Soorin	Lee Joo-hyoung; Kyle Wong; Mayu Wakisaka	Lee	3:08
2.	"Wish"	Kenzie; Jeanjinn Jane; Toyosaki	Dress; Kenzie; Heon Seo; Jane; George Gershwin; Ira Gershwin	Kenzie; Dress	3:05
3.	"Songbird"	Toyosaki	Honey Noise (The Hub); Brown Panda (The Hub); Jacob Aaron (The Hub); Frankie Day (The Hub)	Honey Noise; Brown Panda	3:01
4.	"Far Away"	Yuki Fujiwara	Tim Tan; Daniel Roughley; William Segerdahl; 153/Joombas	Tan; Roughley	3:04
5.	"We Go!"	Meg.Me	Simon Janlöv; Daniel Caesar	Janlöv	3:02
6.	"Touchdown"	Kenzie; Adrian McKinnon; Jop Pangemanan; Akta	Kenzie; McKinnon; Pangemanan; Ludvig Evers (Moonshine); Jonatan Gusmark (Moonshine)	Moonshine; Kenzie	3:12
7.	"Hands Up"	Kenzie; H. Toyosaki	Kenzie; Evers; Gusmark; McKinnon	Moonshine	3:14
8.	"Sail Away"	Meg.Me	Cazzi Opeia; Emily Yeonseo Kim; Sonny J Mason	Mason	3:25
9.	"Choo Choo"	Takahishi Shiho	Alexander Karlsson; Alexej Viktorovitch; John Mars	Viktorovitch; Mars	3:34
10.	"NASA"	D&H	Greg Bonnick; Hayden Chapman; Jeremy "Tay" Jasper; Justin Starling; Young Chance; Shorelle	LDN Noise	3:03
11.	"P.O.V"	Meg.Me	Jake K. (Artiffect); Hyun	Jake K.	3:01
12.	"Tears Are Falling"	Irodori Kaoru	Christopher Lund Nissen; Nicklas Sahl; Jeppe London Blisby; Rick Bridges	Blisby	3:05
13.	"Our Adventures"	Mahiro	Sqvare; Avenue 52; Nild	Nild	2:52
Total length:					40:51

=== Notes ===
- "Wish" contains sampled elements from "Love Is Here To Say" (1980), as written by George Gershwin and Ira Gershwin, and performed by The Singers Unlimited.

== Charts ==
=== Weekly charts ===
Weekly chart performance for Wishful
Chart (2024–2025)	Peak position
Japanese Albums (Oricon)	2
Japanese Combined Albums (Oricon)	2
Japanese Hot Albums (Billboard Japan)	4

=== Monthly charts ===
Monthly chart performance for Wishful
Chart (2024)	Position
Japanese Albums (Oricon)	6

=== Year-end charts ===
Year-end chart performance for Wishful
Chart (2025)	Position
Japanese Albums (Oricon)	56
Japanese Top Albums Sales (Billboard Japan)	51

== Release history ==
Release history for Wishful
Region	Date	Format	Label
Various	November 27, 2024	Digital download; streaming	SM; Avex
Japan	December 25, 2024	CD; CD+Blu-ray	SM; Avex
