= Poppop =

- Digital cover

EP by NCT Wish
- Released: April 14, 2025
- Genre: K-pop
- Length: 17:50
- Language: Korean
- Labels: SM; Kakao

NCT Wish chronology
Wishful (2024)	Poppop (2025)	Color (2025)

NCT chronology
Wishful (2024)	Poppop (2025)	Go Back to the Future (2025)

Singles from Poppop
- 1. "Poppop" Released: April 14, 2025

Poppop is the second Korean extended play and second overall by Japanese boy group NCT Wish, the Japanese-based unit of boy group NCT. It was released on April 14, 2025, through SM Entertainment and Kakao Entertainment. The EP comprises six tracks.

== Background and release ==
SM Entertainment announced in March 2025 that NCT Wish would be releasing their second EP, Poppop, on April 14 that year. It was their first release in four months since their first Japanese album in December 2024. The EP also marked the return of group member Riku, who had been on a four month hiatus.

== Track listing ==
Poppop track listing
No.	Title	Lyrics	Music	Arrangement	Length
1.	"Poppop"	Kenzie	Jackson Morgan; JBach; Amelia Moore; Kyle Buckley; Charles Robert Nelson; MZMC	Pink Slip; Inverness; MZMC	3:02
2.	"Melt Inside My Pocket"	Kenzie	Kenzie; Rouno; Andrew Choi; Jsong	Kenzie; Rouno	3:11
3.	"Design"	Somdef	Somdef; Geoffro; Edwin Honoret	Somdef; Geoffro	2:59
4.	"1000"	Paprikaa; Lim Jung-woo	Dana; Paprikaa; Lim	Paprikaa	2:51
5.	"Silly Dance"	Jeon Gan-dhi	Lee Joo-hyoung; Kyle Wong; Lilja Scarfi; Jonathan B-T	Lee	3:02
6.	"Still 3PM" (만약 네가 4시에 온다면)	Angdoo Lee	Shaun Kim; Haedo; Jword	Kim	2:45
Total length:					17:50

== Charts ==
=== Weekly charts ===
Weekly chart performance for Poppop
Chart (2025)	Peak position
Japanese Albums (Oricon)	5
Japanese Combined Albums (Oricon)	7
Japanese Hot Albums (Billboard Japan)	43
South Korean Albums (Circle)	1

=== Monthly charts ===
Monthly chart performance for Poppop
Chart (2025)	Position
Japanese Albums (Oricon)	10
South Korean Albums (Circle)	1

=== Year-end charts ===
Year-end chart performance for Poppop
Chart (2025)	Position
South Korean Albums (Circle)	14

== Release history ==
Release history for Poppop
Region	Date	Format	Label
South Korea	April 14, 2025	CD	SM
Various	April 14, 2025	Digital download; streaming	SM
