= NCT Wish =

Japanese-Korean boy band

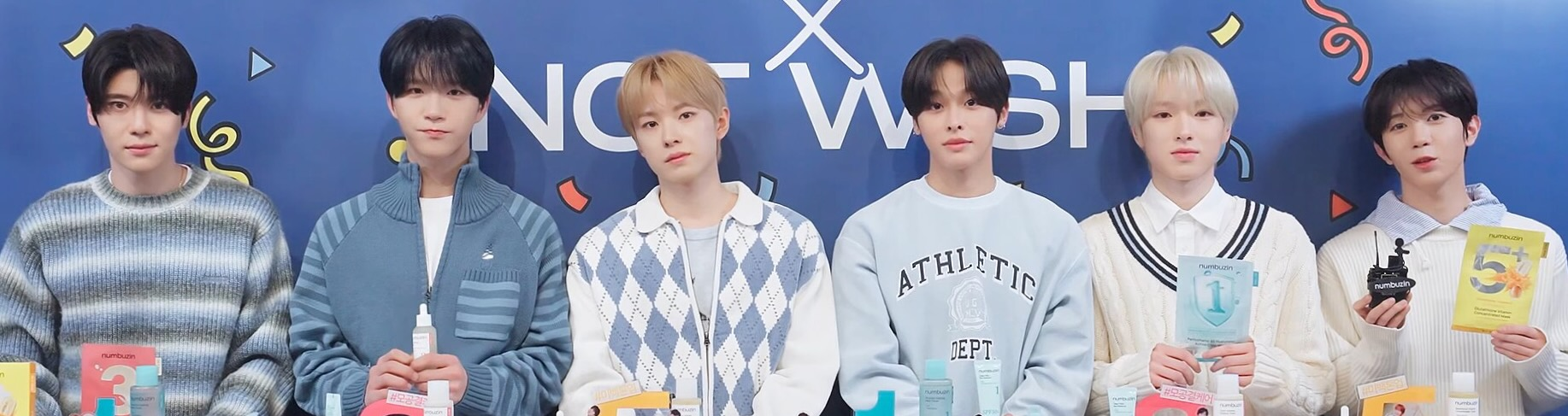
- NCT Wish in 2026; L–R: Sion, Jaehee, Yushi, Riku, Sakuya, and Ryo

Background information
- Origin: Tokyo, Japan
- Genres: J-pop; K-pop
- Years active: 2023–present
- Labels: SM; Avex Trax
- Spinoff of: NCT
- Members: Sion; Riku; Yushi; Jaehee; Ryo; Sakuya
- Website: Official website

NCT Wish (Japanese: エヌシーティー·ウィッシュ, Hepburn: Enushītī Wisshu) is a Japanese-Korean boy band and the sixth sub-unit of the South Korean boy band NCT, formed and managed by SM Entertainment and Avex Trax, with SM director and soloist BoA in charge as the producer until her departure from SM in 2025. The group consists of six members: Sion, Riku, Yushi, Jaehee, Ryo, and Sakuya. They released the single "Hands Up" under the tentative name NCT New Team on October 8, 2023, ahead of their scheduled debut in 2024. They officially debuted on February 21, 2024, with the single "Wish" in both Japanese and Korean versions.

== Name ==
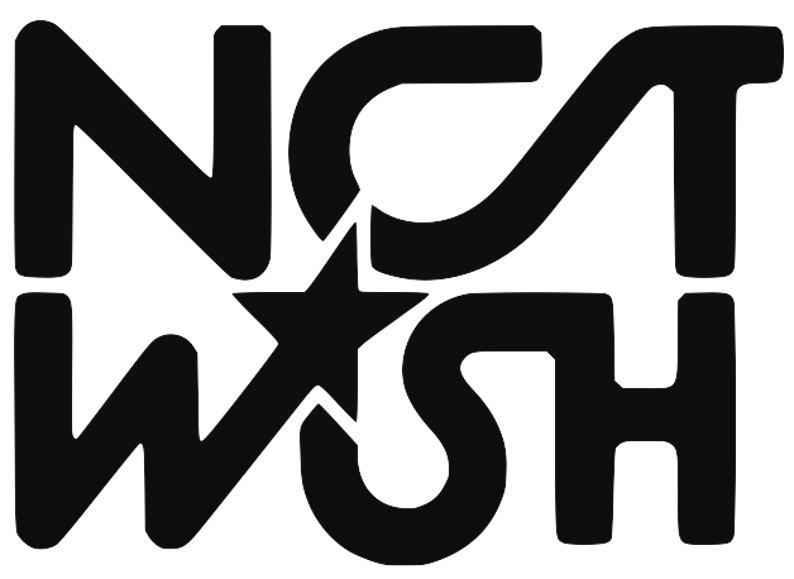
NCT Wish's official logo

On January 17, 2024, NCT Wish was announced as the group's official name of the NCT Tokyo-based sub-unit, multi-national boy group that would promote actively in Japan. The name "NCT Wish" combines the acronym for Neo Culture Technology with the word "Wish" from the catchphrase 'WISH for Our WISH' meaning the ambition to support everyone's wishes and dreams and make them come true together through the music and love.

== History ==
=== 2019–2023: Plans, formation and NCT New Team ===
Prior to the group's debut, Yushi was first introduced as a member of Japanese boy group Edamame Beans at the age of 11 but shortly left the group before debut in the same year. Yushi first auditioned for SM Entertainment in his fourth grade of elementary school and was accepted as a trainee in his sixth grade of elementary school. He later came to Korea in his 6th grade of elementary school and trained for about seven years prior joining the survival show. Riku had filmed a visual advertisement for his cousin Ai Takahashi's own cosmetics brand Aimmx in October 2021. Riku was cast through the 2022 SM Global Audition and was a trainee for about one year prior joining the survival show. Sion was cast through Instagram's direct messaging and trained for four years prior joining the survival show. In 2022, Ryo was first scouted by SM while he was watching NCT 127's concert. In January 2023, Jaehee was scouted by SM Entertainment.

In January 2016, SM founder and producer Lee Soo-man announced plans for a new boy group NCT with different units to be based in cities around the world. On June 20, 2019, SM producer Chris Lee announced in a presentation that NCT would continue to debut international units, mentioning that the company was in the process of creating a Japanese one. This was re-iterated in an interview with Billboard the following day, where the unit's activities were confirmed to be managed between Avex Trax and SM Japan.

On December 1, 2022, SM confirmed plans for a Japanese subunit based in Tokyo following the opening of their Southeast Asian branch. As part of their 2023 strategy, the company revealed that the next NCT subunit, tentatively named "NCT Tokyo", would be debuting in the third quarter of the year. On February 24, SM announced that NCT Tokyo would the group's final subunit.

On May 23, 2023, SM announced that two future SM Rookies would be part of the new unit's lineup, with the remaining members selected via a pre-debut survival show. The rookies were revealed to be Yushi and Sion on June 28; two days later, SM confirmed that the survival show NCT Universe: Lastart would begin airing on July 27. The official lineup of the group, now referred to as "NCT New Team", was unveiled during the final episode: Sion, Riku, Yushi, Jungmin, Daeyoung (Jaehee), Ryo, Sakuya. The group served as the opening for the rest of NCT at their Japanese NCT Nation: To the World concerts at Yanmar Stadium Nagai in Osaka from September 9 to 10 and again at Ajinomoto Stadium in Tokyo from September 16 to 17. The new NCT unit later embarked on a pre-debut tour beginning on 8 October, which consisted of 28 performances across 10 cities in Japan.

On October 2, 2023, SM announced that Jungmin, who had been absent from previous performances, would be departing NCT for health reasons. The unit released their pre-debut single "Hands Up" on October 8, with their official debut confirmed for 2024.

=== 2024–present: Debut, subsequent single releases, Steady, and Wishful ===
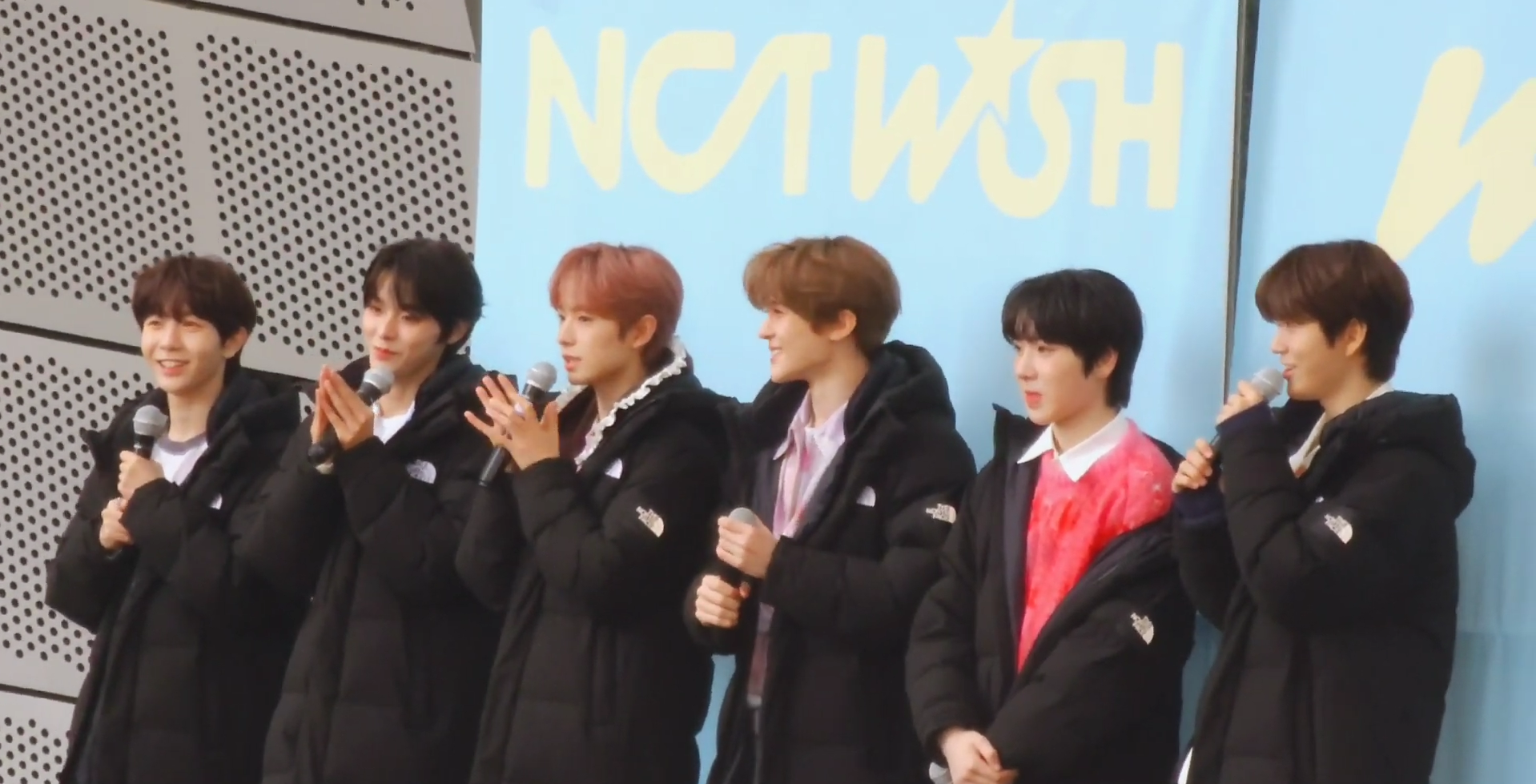
NCT Wish in March 2024

On January 17, SM released a teaser titled "NCT Wish: Wish for Our Wish" and confirmed that NCT New Team would be debuting in February under the name NCT Wish. Also in January 2024, the Recording Academy listed NCT Wish as one of "11 Rookie K-Pop Acts to Know in 2024". On February 21, NCT Wish performed their debut single "Wish" for the first time at SMTOWN Live 2024 SMCU Palace at Tokyo. The group made their debut on February 28 with the release of the single "Wish" in both Japanese and Korean versions. They took their first music show win on SBS M's The Show, 21 days after they debuted.

On April 11, NCT Wish announced their first fan meeting titled "NCT Wish: School of Wish" which would be held for four times at Myunghwa Livehall in Seoul on May 25–26 and the pre-sale tickets were sold out within 15 minutes. Later, they added five more dates with a total of 14 meetings in five cities.

On May 3, NCT Wish attended and performed their songs at GirlsAward, one of the biggest fashion events in Japan. On June 25, NCT Wish released their second Japanese single "Songbird". The Korean version of the single was released as the lead track for the single album of the same name on July 1.

On August 28, NCT Wish confirmed that they would release new music at the end of September and were in the final stages of preparations. The release was preceded by a pre-release track in early September. Their first EP, Steady was released on September 24. On October 15, NCT Wish released the single "Make You Shine", the second ending theme for the Korean dub of Pokémon Horizons: The Series.

NCT Wish's debut studio album, Wishful, was released on November 27. The 13 track album contains the group's six previously released Japanese singles, as well as seven new tracks, including the single "Wishful Winter".

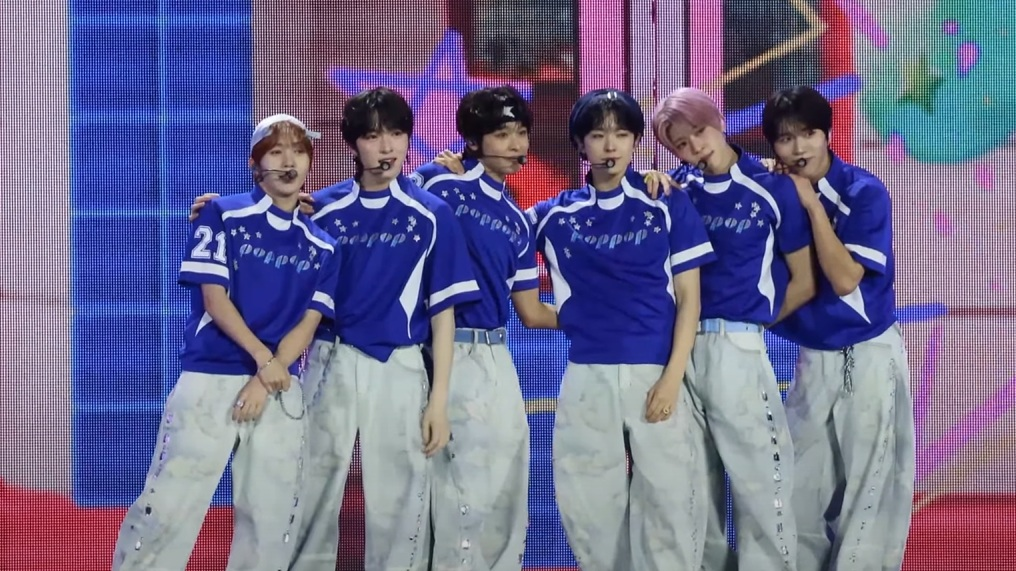
NCT Wish performing their single "Poppop" in April 2025

On January 22, 2025, NCT Wish released the digital single "Miracle", a remake of the song of the same name by Super Junior, as the second single from the album 2025 SM Town: The Culture, the Future. NCT Wish released their second EP, Poppop, on April 14. NCT Wish's third EP, Color, was released on September 1. "Surf" was pre-released on August 12.

NCT Wish's first Japanese EP, Wishlist, was released on January 14, 2026. On April 20, the group released their first full-length album, Ode to Love. On October 12, NCT Wish released their fifth EP, I Spy.

== Members ==
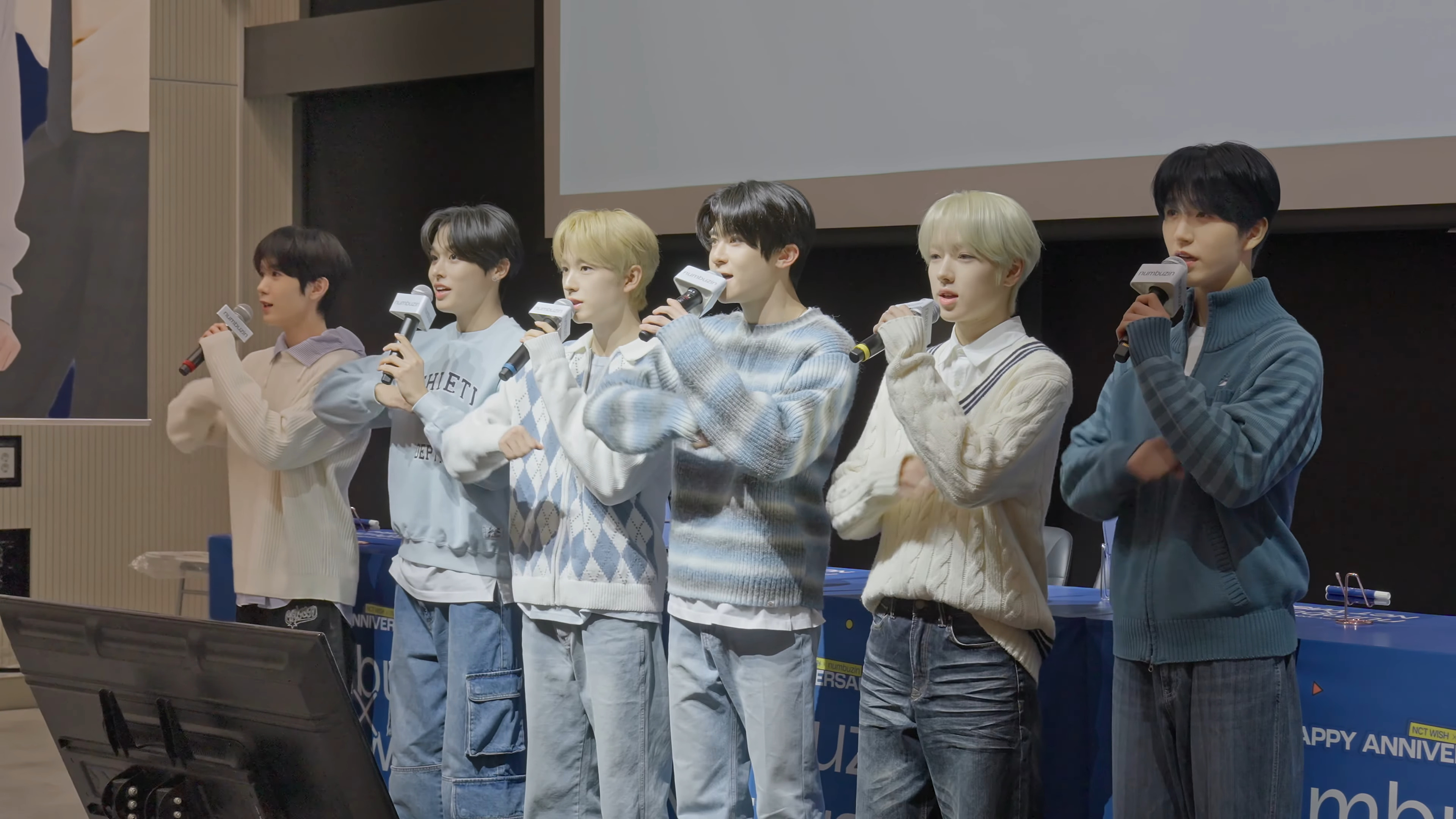
NCT Wish in 2026 (left–right: Ryo, Riku, Yushi, Sion, Sakuya, and Jaehee)

- Sion (シオン, 시온) – leader
- Riku (リク, 리쿠)
- Yushi (ユウシ, 유우시)
- Jaehee (ジェヒ, 재희)
- Ryo (リョウ, 료)
- Sakuya (サクヤ, 사쿠야)

== Discography ==
Japanese studio albums

- Wishful (2024)

Korean studio albums

- Ode to Love (2026)

== Filmography ==
- NCT Universe: Lastart (2023)

== Tours and concerts ==
=== Headlining tours ===
NCT Wish: School of Wish (2024)

Date	City	Country	Venue
May 24, 2024	Seoul	South Korea	Myunghwa Live Hall
May 25, 2024 (Note: Two shows)	Seoul	South Korea	Myunghwa Live Hall
May 26, 2024	Seoul	South Korea	Myunghwa Live Hall
June 1, 2024	Busan	South Korea	Busan Dream Theater
June 8, 2024	Jeonju	South Korea	Samsung Cultural Center
June 15, 2024	Daegu	South Korea	Suseong Artpia Grand Theater
June 22, 2024	Cheongju	South Korea	CJB Media Center Eden Art Hall

NCT Wish Asia Tour Log In (2024–2025)

Date	City	Country	Venue	Attendance
November 3, 2024	Ishikawa	Japan	Hondanomori Hokuden Hall	30,000
November 4, 2024	Ishikawa	Japan	Hondanomori Hokuden Hall	30,000
November 9, 2024	Kyoto	Japan	ROHM Theatre Kyoto	30,000
November 10, 2024	Kyoto	Japan	ROHM Theatre Kyoto	30,000
November 27, 2024	Kanagawa	Japan	Pacifico Yokohama, National Convention Hall	30,000
November 28, 2024	Kanagawa	Japan	Pacifico Yokohama, National Convention Hall	30,000
November 30, 2024	Hyogo	Japan	Amasaki Amashin Archaic Hall	30,000
December 1, 2024	Hyogo	Japan	Amasaki Amashin Archaic Hall	30,000
December 6, 2024	Fukuoka	Japan	Fukuoka Sunpalace Hotel&Hall	30,000
December 7, 2024	Fukuoka	Japan	Fukuoka Sunpalace Hotel&Hall	30,000
December 12, 2024	Aichi	Japan	Nitera Hall	30,000
December 13, 2024	Aichi	Japan	Nitera Hall	30,000
March 21, 2025	Seoul	South Korea	SK Olympic Handball Gymnasium	19,500
March 22, 2025	Seoul	South Korea	SK Olympic Handball Gymnasium	19,500
March 23, 2025	Seoul	South Korea	SK Olympic Handball Gymnasium	19,500
April 4, 2025	Macau	China	Broadway Theatre	
April 5, 2025	Macau	China	Broadway Theatre	
April 6, 2025	Macau	China	Broadway Theatre	
April 12, 2025	Manila	Philippines	New Frontier Theater	
May 2, 2025	Hong Kong	China	AsiaWorld-Expo Hall 10	
May 3, 2025	Hong Kong	China	AsiaWorld-Expo Hall 10	
May 17, 2025	Singapore		Arena @ Expo	
May 24, 2025	Taipei	Taiwan	Taipei Music Center	
May 31, 2025	Jakarta	Indonesia	Tennis Indoor Senayan	
June 7, 2025	Bangkok	Thailand	Thunder Dome	
Total				

NCT Wish 1st Concert Tour 'Into The Wish : Our Wish' (2025–2026)

Date	City	Country	Venue	Attendance
October 31, 2025	Incheon	South Korea	Inspire Arena	24,000
November 1, 2025	Incheon	South Korea	Inspire Arena	24,000
November 2, 2025	Incheon	South Korea	Inspire Arena	24,000
November 8, 2025	Ishikawa	Japan	Hondanomori Hokuden Hall	
November 9, 2025	Ishikawa	Japan	Hondanomori Hokuden Hall	
November 15, 2025	Hiroshima	Japan	Hiroshima Bunka Gakuen HBG Hall	
November 16, 2025	Kagawa	Japan	Sunport Hall Takamatsu	
November 21, 2025	Osaka	Japan	Orix Theater	
November 22, 2025	Osaka	Japan	Orix Theater	
November 23, 2025	Osaka	Japan	Orix Theater	
November 29, 2025	Hokkaido	Japan	Kanamoro Hall	
December 18, 2025	Fukuoka	Japan	Fukuoka Sunpalace Hotel&Hall	
December 19, 2025	Fukuoka	Japan	Fukuoka Sunpalace Hotel&Hall	
December 21, 2025	Aichi	Japan	Aichi Prefectural Art Theater	
December 22, 2025	Aichi	Japan	Aichi Prefectural Art Theater	
December 23, 2025	Aichi	Japan	Aichi Prefectural Art Theater	
January 3, 2026	Hyogo	Japan	World Memorial Hall	
January 4, 2026	Hyogo	Japan	World Memorial Hall	
January 17, 2026	Tokyo	Japan	Yoyogi National Gymnasium	
January 18, 2026	Tokyo	Japan	Yoyogi National Gymnasium	
January 25, 2026	Hong Kong	China	AsiaWorld-Expo Hall 10	
February 6, 2026	Kuala Lumpur	Malaysia	Mega Star Arena	
February 28, 2026	Taipei	Taiwan	NTSU Arena	
March 14, 2026	Metro Manila	Philippines	New Frontier Theatre	
March 21, 2026	Macau	China	The Venetian Arena	
April 4, 2026	Bangkok	Thailand	BITEC Live	
April 11, 2026	Jakarta	Indonesia	ICE BSD Hall 5	
April 17, 2026	Seoul	South Korea	KSPO Dome	
April 18, 2026	Seoul	South Korea	KSPO Dome	
April 19, 2026	Seoul	South Korea	KSPO Dome	
Total				

NCT Wish 2nd Concert Tour 'Into The Wish : Face Our Wish' (2027)

Date	City	Country	Venue	Attendance
January 15, 2027	Seoul	South Korea	Gocheok Sky Dome	
January 16, 2027	Seoul	South Korea	Gocheok Sky Dome	
January 23, 2027	Kaohsiung	Taiwan	Kaohsiung Arena	
February 6, 2027	Bangkok	Thailand	Impact Arena	
February 13, 2027	Manila	Philippines	Smart Araneta Coliseum	
February 26, 2027	Tokyo	Japan	Yoyogi National Stadium 1st Gymnasium	
February 27, 2027	Tokyo	Japan	Yoyogi National Stadium 1st Gymnasium	
February 28, 2027	Tokyo	Japan	Yoyogi National Stadium 1st Gymnasium	
March 5, 2027	Hyogo	Japan	Glion Arena Kobe	
March 6, 2027	Hyogo	Japan	Glion Arena Kobe	
March 7, 2027	Hyogo	Japan	Glion Arena Kobe	
March 13, 2027	Fukuoka	Japan	Kitakyushu Messe	
March 14, 2027	Fukuoka	Japan	Kitakyushu Messe	
March 21, 2027	Aichi	Japan	Port Messe Nagoya Exhibition Hall 1	
March 22, 2027	Aichi	Japan	Port Messe Nagoya Exhibition Hall 1	
March 27, 2027	Macau	China	Galaxy Arena	
March 28, 2027	Macau	China	Galaxy Arena	
April 3, 2027	Taipei	Taiwan	Taipei Arena	
April 10, 2027	Jakarta	Indonesia	ICE BSD Hall 5	
April 24, 2027	Kuala Lumpur	Malaysia	Idea Live Arena	
April 30, 2027	Hong Kong	China	Asiaworld-Arena	

== Concert participation ==
- NCT Universe: Lastart Pre-Debut Tour (2023)
- SM Town Live 2025: The Culture, the Future (2025)

As opening act

- NCT Nation: To the World (2023)

== Awards and nominations ==
Name of the award ceremony, year presented, award category, nominee(s) and the result of the award
Award ceremony	Year	Category	Nominee/work	Result	Ref.
Asia Star Entertainer Awards	2024	The Best New Artist	NCT Wish	Won	
D Awards	2025	Rookie of the Year	NCT Wish	Won	
D Awards	2025	Dreams Silver Label	NCT Wish	Won	
D Awards	2025	Best Popularity Award – Boy Group	NCT Wish	Nominated	
Golden Disc Awards	2025	Rookie Artist of the Year	NCT Wish	Won	
Golden Disc Awards	2025	Most Popular Artist – Male	NCT Wish	Nominated	
Golden Disc Awards	2025	Album Bonsang	Steady	Nominated	
Golden Disc Awards	2026	Album Bonsang	Color	Won	
Golden Disc Awards	2026	Album Daesang (Album of the Year)	Color	Nominated	
Golden Disc Awards	2026	Most Popular Artist – Male	NCT Wish	Nominated	
Hanteo Music Awards	2025	Artists of the Year (Bonsang)	NCT Wish	Won	
Hanteo Music Awards	2025	Best Continent Artist – Africa	NCT Wish	Nominated	
Hanteo Music Awards	2025	Best Continent Artist – Asia	NCT Wish	Nominated	
Hanteo Music Awards	2025	Best Continent Artist – Europe	NCT Wish	Nominated	
Hanteo Music Awards	2025	Best Continent Artist – North America	NCT Wish	Nominated	
Hanteo Music Awards	2025	Best Continent Artist – Oceania	NCT Wish	Nominated	
Hanteo Music Awards	2025	Best Continent Artist – South America	NCT Wish	Nominated	
Hanteo Music Awards	2025	Best Popular Artist	NCT Wish	Nominated	
Hanteo Music Awards	2025	Best Global Popular Artist	NCT Wish	Nominated	
iHeartRadio Music Awards	2025	Best New Artist (K-pop)	NCT Wish	Nominated	
Korea First Brand Awards	2026	Male Idol – Hot Trend	NCT Wish	Won	
Korea Grand Music Awards	2024	IS Rising Star	NCT Wish	Won	
MAMA Awards	2024	Artist of the Year	NCT Wish	Longlisted	
MAMA Awards	2024	Best New Male Artist	NCT Wish	Nominated	
MAMA Awards	2025	Album of the Year	Color	Longlisted	
MAMA Awards	2025	Best Dance Performance – Male Group	"Poppop"	Nominated	
MAMA Awards	2025	Fans' Choice of the Year	NCT Wish	Longlisted	
MAMA Awards	2025	Fans' Choice Top 10 – Male	NCT Wish	Nominated	
MAMA Awards	2025	Song of the Year	"Poppop"	Longlisted	
Melon Music Awards	2025	Top 10 Artist	NCT Wish	Won	
Melon Music Awards	2025	Kakao Bank Everyone's Star	NCT Wish	Won	
Melon Music Awards	2025	Artist of the Year	NCT Wish	Nominated	
Melon Music Awards	2025	Millions Top 10	Color	Nominated	
Melon Music Awards	2025	Berriz Global Fan's Choice	NCT Wish	Nominated	
Seoul Music Awards	2025	Main Prize (Bonsang)	NCT Wish	Won	
Seoul Music Awards	2025	Grand Prize (Daesang)	NCT Wish	Nominated	
Seoul Music Awards	2025	Best Group Award	NCT Wish	Won	
Seoul Music Awards	2025	Popularity Award	NCT Wish	Nominated	
Seoul Music Awards	2025	K-Wave Special Award	NCT Wish	Nominated	
Seoul Music Awards	2025	K-pop World Choice – Group	NCT Wish	Nominated	
TMElive International Music Awards	2025	Rising International Group of the Year	NCT Wish	Won	
