= Wish (NCT Wish song) =

- Digital cover

Single by NCT Wish

from the album Wishful
- Language: Japanese; Korean
- B-side: "Sail Away"
- Released: February 28, 2024
- Studio: Doobdoob; SM Lyvin
- Genre: Old-school hip hop
- Length: 3:05
- Label: Avex; SM
- Composers: Dress; Kenzie; Heon Seo; Jeanjinn Jane; George Gershwin; Ira Gershwin
- Lyricists: Kenzie; Jeanjinn Jane; H. Toyosaki (Note: Japanese version only)

NCT Wish singles chronology
"Hands Up" (2023)	"Wish" (2024)	"Songbird" (2024)

NCT singles chronology
"Be There for Me" (2023)	"Wish" (2024)	"Give Me That" (2024)

Music video
- "Wish" (Japanese version) on YouTube "Wish" (Korean version) on YouTube

Professional ratings
Review scores
Source	Rating
IZM	3/5 stars

"Wish" is the debut single by Japanese boy group NCT Wish, the Japanese-based unit of boy group NCT. It was released on February 28, 2024, as a maxi single in Japan, and subsequently the lead single off the group's debut Japanese studio album Wishful, and as the title track for the single album of the same name in South Korea. The single additionally contains the B-side track "Sail Away". The single album debuted atop the South Korean Circle Album Chart.

== Background and release ==
On February 12, 2024, SM Entertainment announced NCT Wish's official debut with the single "Wish". A teaser for the single's music video was released on February 26. The single was released digitally globally and physically in Japan on February 28, 2024. The physical single album of the same name containing the song was then released in South Korea on March 4, 2024.

== Promotion ==
Prior to the single's release, the group performed the song at SMTOWN Live 2024 SMCU Palace at Tokyo on February 21 and 22. On the same day of the album's release in South Korea, the group held a fan-meeting titled NCT Wish's Wishlist. They subsequently performed the song on five South Korean music programs: Mnet's M Countdown on March 7, KBS's Music Bank on March 8, MBC's Show! Music Core on March 9, SBS M's The Show on March 12, MBC M's Show Champion on March 13. The group also hosted a special radio program on InterFM in Japan every Monday of March to promote their debut.

== Accolades ==
On South Korean music programs, "Wish" achieved first place wins on the March 12 episode of The Show, and March 13 episode of Show Champion.

== Track listing ==
"Wish" – digital single
No.	Title	Lyrics	Music	Arrangement	Length
1.	"Wish" (Japanese version)	Kenzie; Jeanjinn Jane; H. Toyosaki	Dress; Kenzie; Heon Seo; Jane; George Gershwin; Ira Gershwin	Kenzie; Dress	3:05
2.	"Wish" (Korean version)	Kenzie; Jane	Dress; Kenzie; Seo; Jane; G. Gershwin; I. Gershwin	Kenzie; Dress	3:05
3.	"Sail Away" (Japanese version)	Meg.Me	Cazzi Opeia; Emily Yeonseo Kim; Sonny J Mason	Mason	3:25
4.	"Sail Away" (Korean version)	Meg.Me; Jo Yoon-kyung	Cazzi Opeia; Kim; Mason	Mason	3:25
Total length:					13:02

"Wish" – Japanese CD single
No.	Title	Length
1.	"Wish" (Japanese version)	3:05
2.	"Sail Away" (Japanese version)	3:25
Total length:		6:30

Wish – Korean single album
No.	Title	Length
1.	"Wish" (Korean version)	3:05
2.	"Sail Away" (Korean version)	3:25
Total length:		6:30

=== Notes ===
- "Wish" contains sampled elements from "Love Is Here To Stay" (1980), as written by George Gershwin and Ira Gershwin, and performed by The Singers Unlimited.

== Charts ==
=== Weekly charts ===
Weekly chart performance for "Wish" (Japanese version)
Chart (2024)	Peak position
Japan (Japan Hot 100)	3
Japan (Oricon)	3
Japan Combined Singles (Oricon)	4

Weekly chart performance for "Wish" (Korean version)
Chart (2024)	Peak position
South Korea Download (Circle)	71
South Korean Albums (Circle)	1

=== Monthly charts ===
Monthly chart performance for "Wish" (Japanese version)
Chart (2024)	Position
Japan (Oricon)	6

Monthly chart performance for "Wish" (Korean version)
Chart (2024)	Position
South Korean Albums (Circle)	3

=== Year-end charts ===
2024 year-end chart performance for "Wish" (Japanese version)
Chart (2024)	Position
Japan (Oricon)	72
Japan Top Singles Sales (Billboard Japan)	69

Year-end chart performance for Wish (Korean album)
Chart (2024)	Position
South Korean Albums (Circle)	64

== Certifications ==
Certifications for "Wish"
Region	Certification	Certified units/sales
Japan (RIAJ) Physical	Gold	100,000^{^}
South Korea (KMCA) Physical	Platinum	250,000^{^}
^{^} Shipments figures based on certification alone.

== Release history ==
Release history for "Wish"
Region	Date	Format	Version	Label
Various	February 28, 2024	Digital download; streaming	Japanese; Korean	Avex; SM
Japan	February 28, 2024	CD	Japanese	Avex
South Korea	March 4, 2024	CD	Korean	SM
