= Songbird (NCT Wish song) =

- Japanese version digital cover

Single by NCT Wish

from the album Wishful
- Language: Japanese; Korean
- B-side: "Tears Are Falling"
- Released: June 25, 2024
- Genre: Dance-pop
- Length: 3:01
- Label: Avex; SM
- Composers: Honey Noise (The Hub); Brown Panda (The Hub); Jacob Aaron (The Hub); Frankie Day (The Hub)
- Lyricists: Toyosaki H. (Note: Japanese version only); Kang Eun-jung (Note: Korean version only)

NCT Wish singles chronology
"Wish" (2024)	"Songbird" (2024)	"Dunk Shot" (2024)

NCT singles chronology
"Moonlight" (2024)	"Songbird" (2024)	"Walk" (2024)

Alternative cover
- Korean version digital cover

Music video
- "Songbird" (Japanese version) on YouTube "Songbird" (Korean version) on YouTube

"Songbird" is a song recorded by Japanese boy group NCT Wish, the Japanese-based unit of boy group NCT. It was released on June 25, 2024, as a maxi single in Japan and on July 1, 2024, as the title track for the single album of the same name in South Korea. The single additionally contains the B-side track "Tears Are Falling".

== Background and release ==
On May 5, it was announced that NCT Wish will be releasing their second Japanese single "Songbird" on June 26. A follow-up announcement on May 17 revealed a Korean version of the single, slated to be released in the third quarter of the year, later getting a release date of July 1. Teaser images for the single were released on June 11 and 12. A trailer clip, titled Missing Bird in Cupid Museum, was then released on June 21.

The Japanese version of the single was released digitally on June 25, followed by the Korean version on July 1.

== Commercial performance ==
On June 30, prior to the release of the Korean version of "Songbird", the single was reported to have 630,000 pre-orders in South Korea and Japan combined.

== Promotion ==
NCT Wish promoted the Japanese version of the single on TBS's CDTV Live! Live! on May 24, and on TV Tokyo's Ultrasound and NHK's Venue101 on May 29.

== Accolades ==
On South Korean music programs, "Songbird" achieved first place win on the July 10 episode of Show Champion.

== Track listing ==
"Songbird" – Japanese version
No.	Title	Lyrics	Music	Arrangement	Length
1.	"Songbird" (Japanese version)	Toyosaki H.	Honey Noise (The Hub); Brown Panda (The Hub); Jacob Aaron (The Hub); Frankie Day (The Hub)	Honey Noise (The Hub); Brown Panda (The Hub)	3:01
2.	"Tears Are Falling" (Japanese version)	Irodori Kaoru	Christopher Lund Nissen; Nicklas Sahl; Jeppe London Blisby; Rick Bridges	Jeppe London Blisby	3:05
Total length:					6:06

Songbird – Korean version
No.	Title	Lyrics	Music	Arrangement	Length
1.	"Songbird" (Korean version)	Kang Eun-jung	Honey Noise (The Hub); Brown Panda (The Hub); Jacob Aaron (The Hub); Frankie Day (The Hub)	Honey Noise (The Hub); Brown Panda (The Hub)	3:01
2.	"Tears Are Falling" (Korean version)	Ellie Suh (153/Joombas)	Christopher Lund Nissen; Nicklas Sahl; Jeppe London Blisby; Rick Bridges	Jeppe London Blisby	3:05
Total length:					6:06

== Charts ==
=== Weekly charts ===
Weekly chart performance for "Songbird" (Japanese version)
Chart (2024)	Peak position
Japan (Japan Hot 100)	4
Japan (Oricon)	3
Japan Combined Singles (Oricon)	3

Weekly chart performance for "Songbird" (Korean version)
Chart (2024)	Peak position
South Korea (Circle)	196
South Korea Download (Circle)	32
South Korean Albums (Circle)	1

=== Monthly charts ===
Monthly chart performance for "Songbird" (Japanese version)
Chart (2024)	Position
Japan (Oricon)	8

Monthly chart performance for Songbird (Korean album)
Chart (2024)	Position
South Korean Albums (Circle)	7

Chart (2025)	Position
South Korean Albums (Circle)	99

=== Year-end charts ===
2024 year-end chart performance for "Songbird" (Japanese version)
Chart (2024)	Position
Japan (Oricon)	68
Japan Top Singles Sales (Billboard Japan)	71

Year-end chart performance for Songbird (Korean album)
Chart (2024)	Position
South Korean Albums (Circle)	59

== Certifications ==
Certifications for "Songbird"
Region	Certification	Certified units/sales
Japan (RIAJ) Physical	Gold	100,000^{^}
South Korea (KMCA)	Platinum	250,000^{^}
^{^} Shipments figures based on certification alone.

== Release history ==
Release history for "Songbird"
Region	Date	Format	Version	Label
Various	June 25, 2024	Digital download; streaming	Japanese	Avex
Japan	June 26, 2024	CD	Japanese	Avex
Various	July 1, 2024	Digital download; streaming	Korean	SM
South Korea	July 1, 2024	CD	Korean	SM
