= MAMA Award for Best New Artist =

Annual music award

- Awarded for: Top newcomer artist(s) of the year
- Country: South Korea
- Presented by: CJ E&M Pictures (Mnet)
- First award: 1999
- Currently held by: Cortis; Hearts2Hearts; (2025)
- Website: Mnet Asian Music Awards

The MAMA Award for Best New Male / Female Artist (Korean: 남자 신인상 / 여자 신인상) is an award presented by CJ E&M Pictures (Mnet) at the annual MAMA Awards. Mnet is also the one who chooses which group or individual will win this category as well as other categories in MAMA. Since 2008, nominees for this category include both groups and soloists.

The accolade was first awarded at the 1st Mnet Asian Music Awards ceremony held in 1999; winners Lee Jung-hyun and Team received the titles "Best New Solo Artist" and "Best New Group" for their songs "Come" and "Farewell", respectively. The award is given in honor for new artist(s) with the most achievements in the music industry during the course of the year.

== History ==
Year(s)	Best New Solo			Best New Group			Best New Artist (Solo or Group)			Note
Year(s)	Male	Female	Combined	Male	Female	Combined	Male	Female	Combined	Note
1999			check			check				Titled "Best New Solo Artist" and "Best New Group"
2000–2004	check	check				check				Titled "Best New Male/Female Artist" and "Best New Group"
2005–2006			check			check				Titled "Best New Solo Artist" and "Best New Group"
2007			check	check	check					Titled "Best New Solo Artist" and "Best New Female/Male Group"
2008–2013							check	check		Titled "Best New Female/Male Artist"
2014									check	Titled "Best New Artist"
2015–2024							check	check		Titled "Best New Female/Male Artist"
2025									check	Titled "Best New Artist"

== Winners and nominees ==
=== 1990s ===
Year^{[I]}	Recipients	Work	Nominated artists
1999	Lee Jung-hyun	"Come"	Nominees: Baek Ji-young – "Choice"; Cho PD – "Fever" (feat. Lee Jung-hyun); Kim Bum-soo – "Promise"; Lee Soo-young – "I Believe"
1999	Team	"Farewell"	Nominees: 0-24 – "Freedom"; g.o.d – "To Mother"; Voice – "Become Your Only Angel"; Yada – "Already Sad Love"

=== 2000s ===
Year^{[I]}	Recipients	Work	Nominated artists
2000	Choi Jin-young	"Forever"	Nominees: Kim Sa-rang – "Mojorida"; Jim Kim-sung – "Appointment"; Park Hyo-shin – "Things I Can't Do For You"; TJ – "Hey Girl"; Wave – "Damage"
2000	BoA	"ID; Peace B"	Nominees: Chae Na-ri – "Return to The Letter"; Park Hwayobi – "Lie"; Su Jin-kim – "Ending"; Suzanne – "Shadow"
2000	Chakra	"Hate"	Nominees: Fly to the Sky – "Day By Day"; Papaya – "Listen To Me"; TG – "Love Tonight"; UN – "Voice Mail"
2001	Sung Si-kyung	"Like the First Time"	Nominees: Cha Tae-hyun – "I Love You"; Perry – "Storm"; Psy – "Bird"; Yang Dong-geun – "Guri Bang Bang"
2001	Wax	"Oppa"	Nominees: Dana – "Until The End of the World"; Haneul – "Gotta Be Kidding"; Harisu – "Temptation"; Joanne – "First Love"; Yuri – "Sad Soul"
2001	Brown Eyes	"Already One Year"	Nominees: D.BACE – "Everything To You"; The Jadu – "Goodbye"; To-Ya – "Look"; X-Large – "You"
2002	Rain	"Bad Guy"	Nominees: RIch – "Only The Words I Love You"; Simtaeyun – "Mates"; The Name – "The Name"; Wheesung – "Can't We"
2002	Youme	"Love Is Always Thirsty"	Nominees: Ann – "Sick Sick Name"; Park Kyung-lim – "Illusion"; Rinae – "Words Without Goodbye"; Shim Mina – "Answer the Phone"
2002	Black Beat	"In The Sky"	Nominees: M.I.L.K – "Come To Me"; Sugar – "Tell Me Why"; Swi-T – "I'll Be There"; Turtles – "4 Seasons"
2003	Seven	"Come Back to Me"	Nominees: Lee Jung – "Never"; Masta Wu – "Bad Boy"; Park Yong-ha – "Tidings"; Tim – "I Love You"
2003	Maya	"Azalea"	Nominees: Chae Yeon – "Dangerous Directing"; Gummy – "If You Come Back"; Leeds – "You'll Be Happy"; Lexy – "Grasshopper"
2003	Big Mama	"Break Away"	Nominees: 2SHAI – "Love Letter"; F-iV – "Girl"; Noel – "If It's Love"; The Gold – "Two Years, Two Months"
2004	Lee Seung-gi (Note: Titled "Best New Male Video" award.)	"Because You're My Girl"	Nominees: Double K – "Nu Skool"; KCM – "Black And White Photo"; Oh Se-jun – "Memories Ending On Me"; Tei – "Love Leaves Its Scent" (사랑은 향기를 남기고)
2004	Chunja (Note: Titled "Best New Female Video" award.)	"Women with Beautiful Mind"	Nominees: Daylight – "Angel Song"; Hannah – "Bounce"; Lisa – "Tonight"; Sol Flower – "Kiss The Kids"
2004	TVXQ (Note: Titled "Best New Group Video" award.)	"Hug"	Nominees: Buzz – "Monologue"; Clazziquai Project – "Sweety"; SG Wannabe – "Timeless"; Wanted – "Reaction"
2005	Lim Jeong-hee	"Music is My Life"	Nominees: Ivy – "What Happened Tonight"; Kim Woo-joo – "The Letter"; Kyun Woo – "The Words From My Tears"; WonWoo – "Missing In Happiness"
2005	SS501	"Warning"	Nominees: Baechigi – "Nice To Meet You"; Paran – "First Love"; Soulstar – "Only One For Me"; The Grace – "Too Good"
2006	Zhang Liyin (Note: Titled "New Singer of the Year" award.)	"Timeless" (ft. Xiah Junsu)	Nominees: Boom – "Boom Up" (feat. Kim Bum); Crown J – "V.I.P"; MayBee – "Much Laugh"; Suho – "Spring, Summer, Fall... Winter" (feat. Kim Tae-woo)
2006	Super Junior (Note: Titled "New Group of the Year" award.)	"U"	Nominees: Big Bang – "La La La"; Brown Eyed Girls – "Come Closer"; SeeYa – "Scent of a Woman"; Typhoon – "So"
2007	Younha	"Password 486"	Nominees: JJ – "Love Actually"; K.Will – "Left Heart"; Min Hyo-rin – "Stars"; Zia – "Voice Of Heaven"
2007	F.T. Island	"Love Sick"	Nominees: Battle – "Crash"; Supernova – "Hit"; T-max – "Blooming"; Tachyon – "Feel Your Breeze"
2007	Wonder Girls	"Irony"	Nominees: Baby Vox Re.V – "Shee"; Black Pearl – "What Should I Do, I Like You"; Girls' Generation – "Into the New World"; Kara – "Break It"
2008	Shinee	"Replay"	Nominees: 2AM – "This Song"; 2PM – "10 Out of 10"; Mighty Mouth – "I Love You" (feat. JJ); U-Kiss – "I'm Not A Kid"
2008	Davichi	"I Love You Even Though I Hate You"	Nominees: Joo – "Because Of A Man"; Lee Hyun-ji – "Kiss Me Kiss Me"; Moon Ji-eun – "The Fox Song"; Sunha – "Chantey Chantey"
2009	Supreme Team	"Supermagic"	Nominees: Beast – "Bad Girl"; Chungrim – "Step" ft. Benzi; MBLAQ – "Oh Yeah" (feat. Hyuna); Taegoon – "Call Me"
2009	2NE1	"I Don't Care"	Nominees: 4Minute – "Hot Issue"; After School – "Diva "; f(x) – "La Cha Ta"; T-ara – "Lies"

=== 2010s ===
Year^{[I]}	Recipients	Work	Nominated artists
2010	CNBLUE	"I'm a Loner"	Nominees: Infinite – "Come Back Again"; Seo In-guk – "Love U"; Teen Top – "Clap"; ZE:A – "Mazeltov"
2010	Miss A	"Bad Girl Good Girl "	Nominees: G.NA – "I'll Back Off So You Can Live Better" (feat. Junhyung); Nine Muses – "No Playboy"; Rainbow – "A"; Sistar – "Push Push"
2011	Huh Gak	"Hello"	Nominees: B1A4 – "Beautiful Target"; Boyfriend – "Boyfriend"; Kim Ji-soo – "Miss You So"; N-Train – "One Last Cry"
2011	Apink	"I Don't Know"	Nominees: Brave Girls – "Easily"; Dal★Shabet – "Supa Dupa Diva"; Han Groo – "Witch Girl"; Jang Jae-in – "Toy Soldiers"
2012	Ailee	"Heaven"	Nominees: AOA – "Elvis"; Hello Venus – "Venus"; Juniel – "Illa Illa"; Spica – "Painkiller"
2012	Busker Busker	"Cherry Blossom Ending"	Nominees: B.A.P – "Warrior"; EXO-K – "Mama"; John Park – "Falling"; Ulala Session – "Beautiful Night"
2013	Roy Kim	"Love Love Love"	Nominees: BTS – "We Are Bulletproof Pt.2"; Bumkey – "Bad Girl" (feat. E Sens); Jung Joon-young – "Spotless Mind"; Yoo Seung-woo – "Hello"
2013	Crayon Pop	"Bar Bar Bar"	Nominees: Kim Ye-lim – "All Right"; Ladies' Code – "Bad Girl"; Lee Hi – "1,2,3,4"; U Sung-eun – "Be Ok" (feat. Baechigi)
2014	Winner	"Empty"	Nominees: Akdong Musician – "200%"; Eddy Kim – "The Manual"; Got7 – "Girls, Girls, Girls"; Park Boram – "Beautiful" (feat. Zico)
2015	iKon	"Rhythm Ta"	Nominees: Monsta X – "Trespass"; N.Flying – "Awesome"; Seventeen – "Adore U"; UP10TION – "So Dangerous"
2015	Twice	"Like Ooh-Ahh"	Nominees: CLC – "Pepe"; GFriend – "Glass Bead"; Lovelyz – "Candy Jelly Love"; Oh My Girl – "Cupid"
2016	NCT 127	"Fire Truck"	Nominees: ASTRO – "Hide & Seek"; KNK – "Knock"; Pentagon – "Gorilla"; SF9 – "Fanfare"
2016	I.O.I	"Dream Girls"	Nominees: Blackpink – "Whistle"; Bolbbalgan4 – "Galaxy"; Cosmic Girls – "MoMoMo"; Gugudan – "Wonderland"
2017	Wanna One	"Energetic"	Nominees: Golden Child – "Dam Da Di"; Jeong Se-woon – "Just U" (with Sik-K); Samuel – "Sixteen" (feat. Changmo); The East Light – "I Got You"
2017	Pristin	"Wee Woo"	Nominees: Chungha – "Why Don't You Know" (feat. Nucksal); Dreamcatcher – "Fly High"; Momoland – "Freeze"; Weki Meki – "I Dont Like Your Girlfriend"
2018	Stray Kids	"District 9"	Nominees: HAON – "NOAH" (feat. Jay Park and Hoody); Hyeongseop X Euiwoong – "Love Tint"; Kim Dong-han – "Sunset"; The Boyz – "Right Here"; Vinxen – "Sinking Down With You"
2018	Iz*One	"La Vie En Rose"	Nominees: fromis 9 – "Love Bomb"; (G)I-dle – "Latata"; GWSN – "Puzzle Moon"; Loona -"Hi High"; Nature – "Allegro Cantabile"
2019	Tomorrow X Together	"Crown"	Nominees: AB6IX – "Breathe"; Ateez – "Pirate King"; Kang Daniel – "What Are You Up To"; Kim Jae-hwan – "Begin Again"; X1 – "Flash"
2019	Itzy	"Dalla Dalla"	Nominees: Bvndit – "Hocus Pocus"; Cherry Bullet – "Q&A"; Everglow – "Bon Bon Chocolat"; Jeon Somi – "Birthday"; Rocket Punch – "Bim Bam Bum"

=== 2020s ===
Year^{[I]}	Recipients	Work	Nominated artists
2020	Treasure	"Boy"	Nominees: Cravity – "Break All the Rules"; MCND – "Top Gang"; TOO – "Magnolia"; WEi – "Twilight"
2020	Weeekly	"Tag Me"	Nominees: Cignature – "Nun Nu Nan Na"; Natty – "Nineteen"; Secret Number – "Who Dis?"; Woo!ah! – "woo!ah!"
2021	Enhypen	"Given-Taken"	Nominees: Drippin – "Nostalgia"; Epex – "Lock Down"; Mirae – "Killa"; P1Harmony – "Siren"
2021	Aespa	"Black Mamba"	Nominees: Jo Yu-ri – "Glassy"; Kwon Eun-bi – "Door"; Lightsum – "Vanilla"; STAYC – "So Bad"
2022	Xdinary Heroes	"Happy Death Day"	Nominees: ATBO - "Monochrome (Color)"; Tempest - "Bad News"; TNX - "Move"; Younite - "1 of 9"
2022	Ive	"Eleven"	Nominees: Kep1er – "Wa Da Da"; Le Sserafim – "Fearless"; NewJeans – "Attention"; Nmixx – "O.O"; Choi Ye-na – "Smiley"
2023	Zerobaseone	"In Bloom"	Nominees: BoyNextDoor – "One and Only"; Evnne – "Trouble"; Riize – "Get A Guitar"; Xikers – "Tricky House"
2023	TripleS	"Rising"	Nominees: Adya – "Per"; El7z Up –"Cheeky"; Kiss of Life – "Shh"; LimeLight – "Honestly"
2024	TWS	"Plot Twist"	Nominees: 82Major – "Sure Thing"; Ampers&One – "On and On"; All(H)Ours – "Gotcha"; NCT Wish – "Wish"; Nowadays – "OoWee"
2024	Illit	"Magnetic"	Nominees: BabyMonster – "Sheesh"; Meovv – "Meow"; QWER – "Discord"; Unis – "Superwoman"; Young Posse - "Macaroni Cheese"
2025	Cortis	"What You Want"	Nominees: AHOF – "Rendezvous"; AllDay Project – "Famous"; Baby Dont Cry – "F Girl"; Close Your Eyes – "All My Poetry"; Hearts2Hearts – "The Chase"; Idid – "Step It Up"; Izna – "Izna"; KickFlip – "Mama Said"; KiiiKiii – "I Do Me"
2025	Hearts2Hearts	"The Chase"	Nominees: AHOF – "Rendezvous"; AllDay Project – "Famous"; Baby Dont Cry – "F Girl"; Close Your Eyes – "All My Poetry"; Cortis – "What You Want"; Idid – "Step It Up"; Izna – "Izna"; KickFlip – "Mama Said"; KiiiKiii – "I Do Me"

^{^[I]} Each year is linked to the article about the Mnet Asian Music Awards held that year.

^{^[I]} As members of I.O.I in 2016 and then Pristin the following year, Im Nayoung and Zhou Jieqiong have received the award twice.

^{^[I]} As members of IZ*ONE in 2018 and then IVE in 2021, An Yu-jin and Jang Won-young have received the award twice.

== Gallery of winners ==
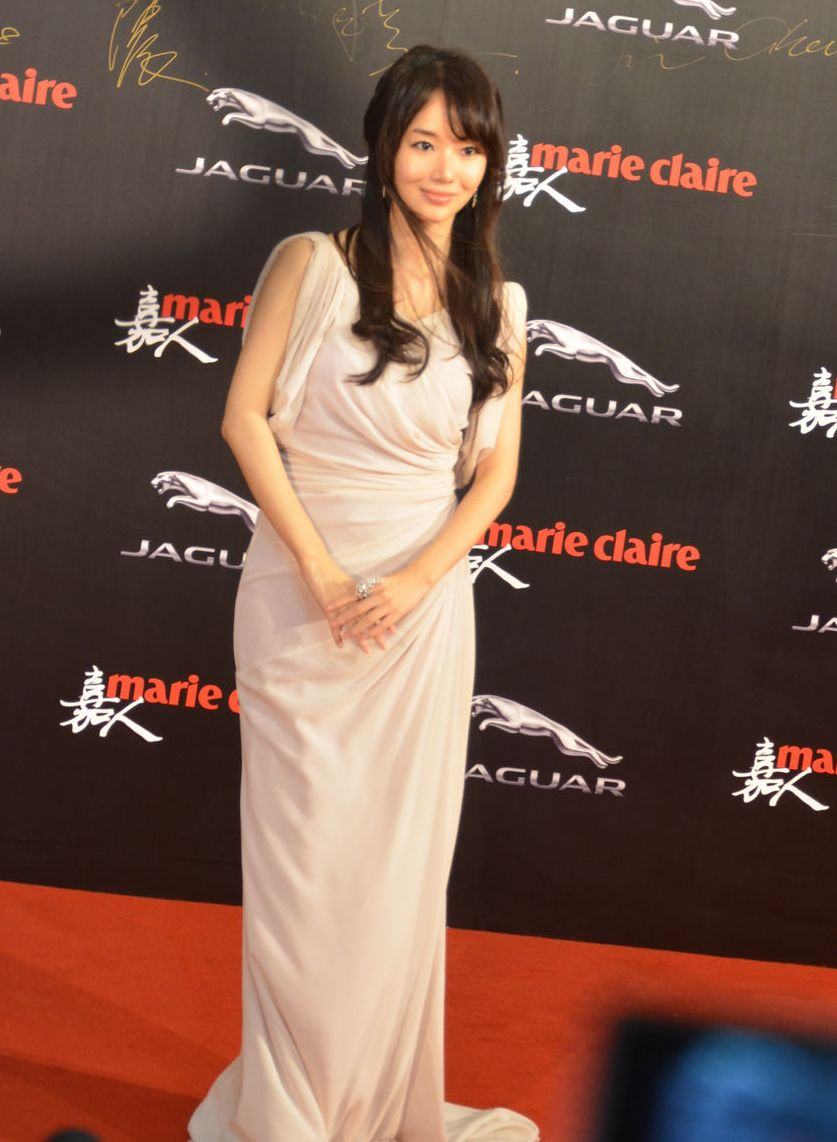
Lee Jung-hyun, (1999)

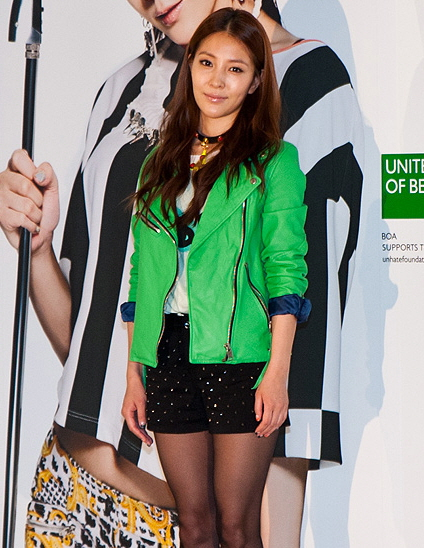
BoA, (2000)

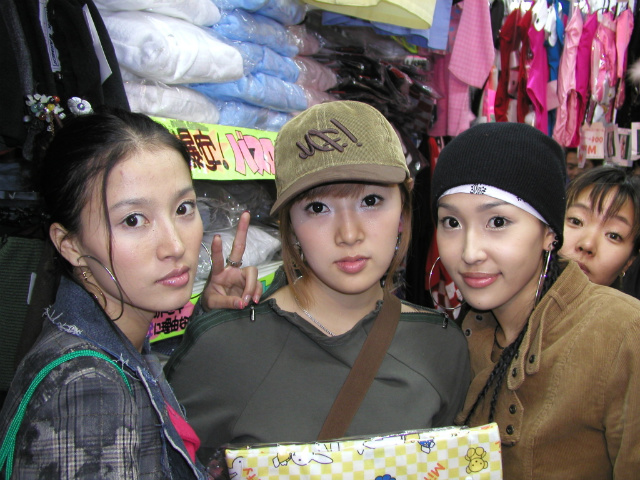
Chakra, (2000)

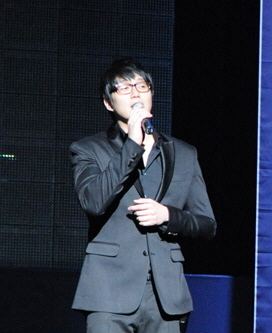
Sung Si-kyung, (2001)

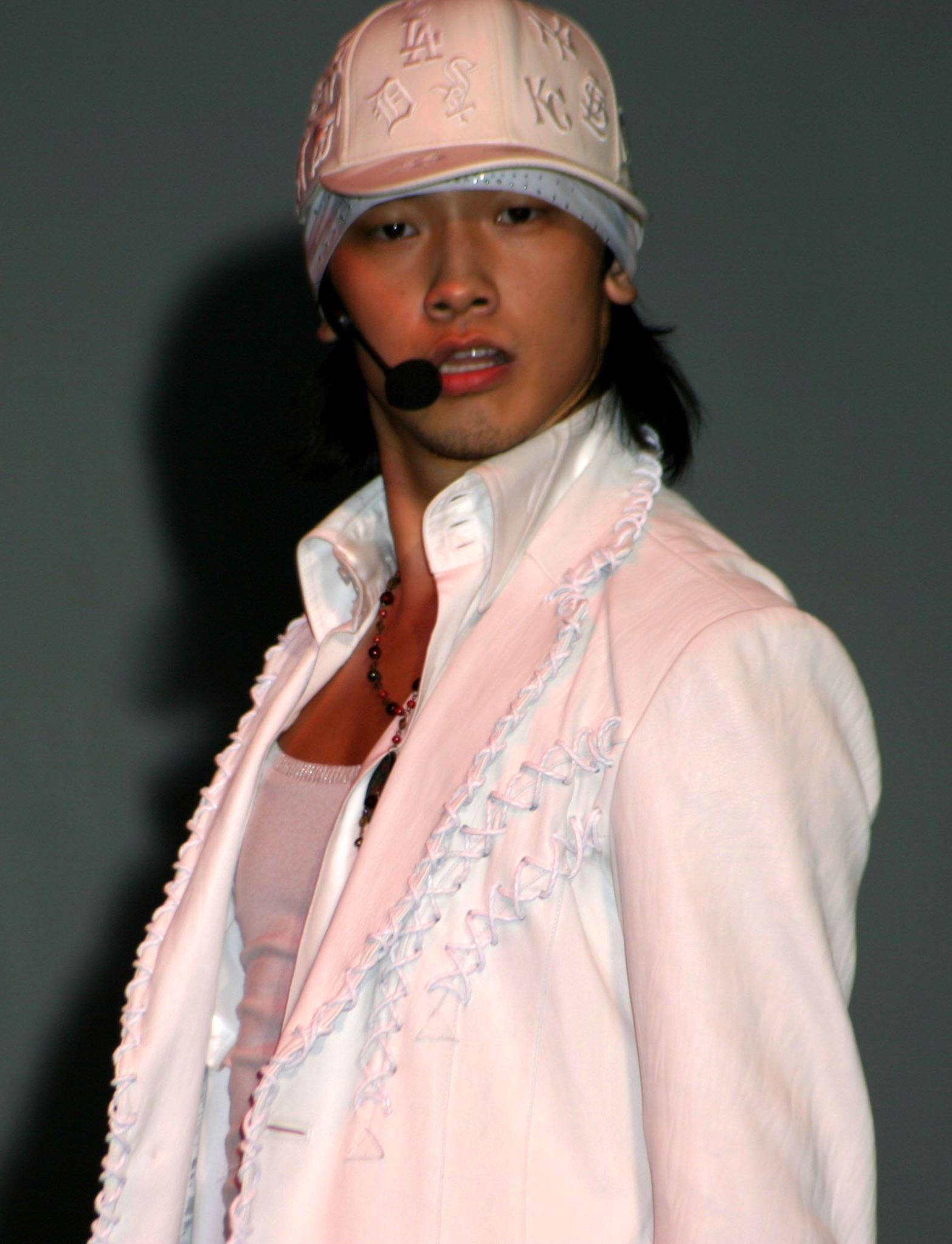
Rain, (2002)

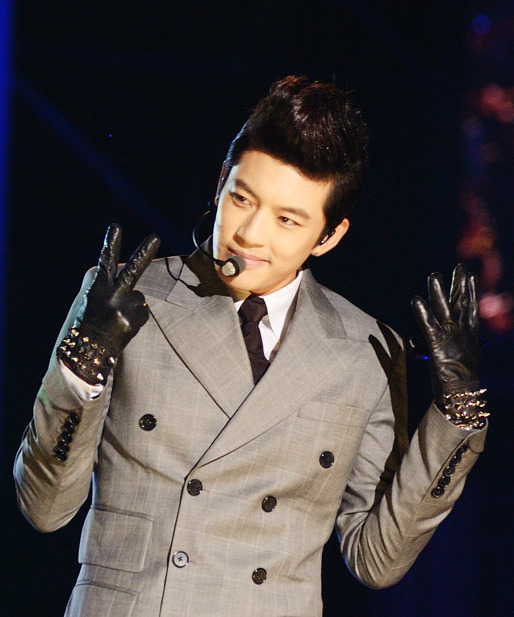
Seven, (2003)

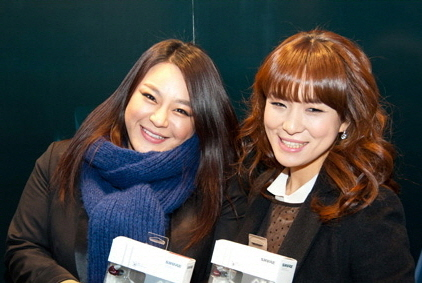
Big Mama, (2003)

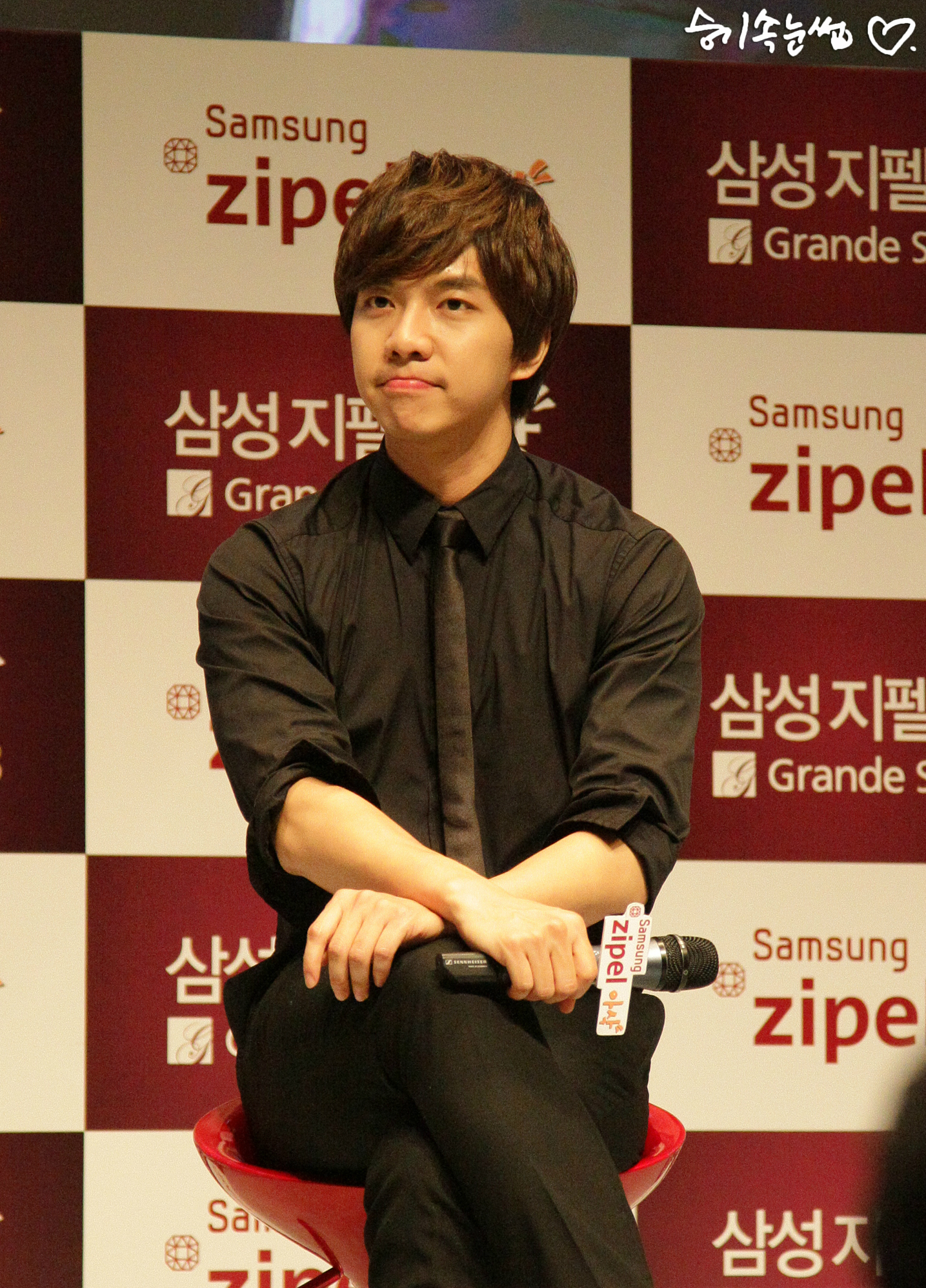
Lee Seung-gi, (2004)

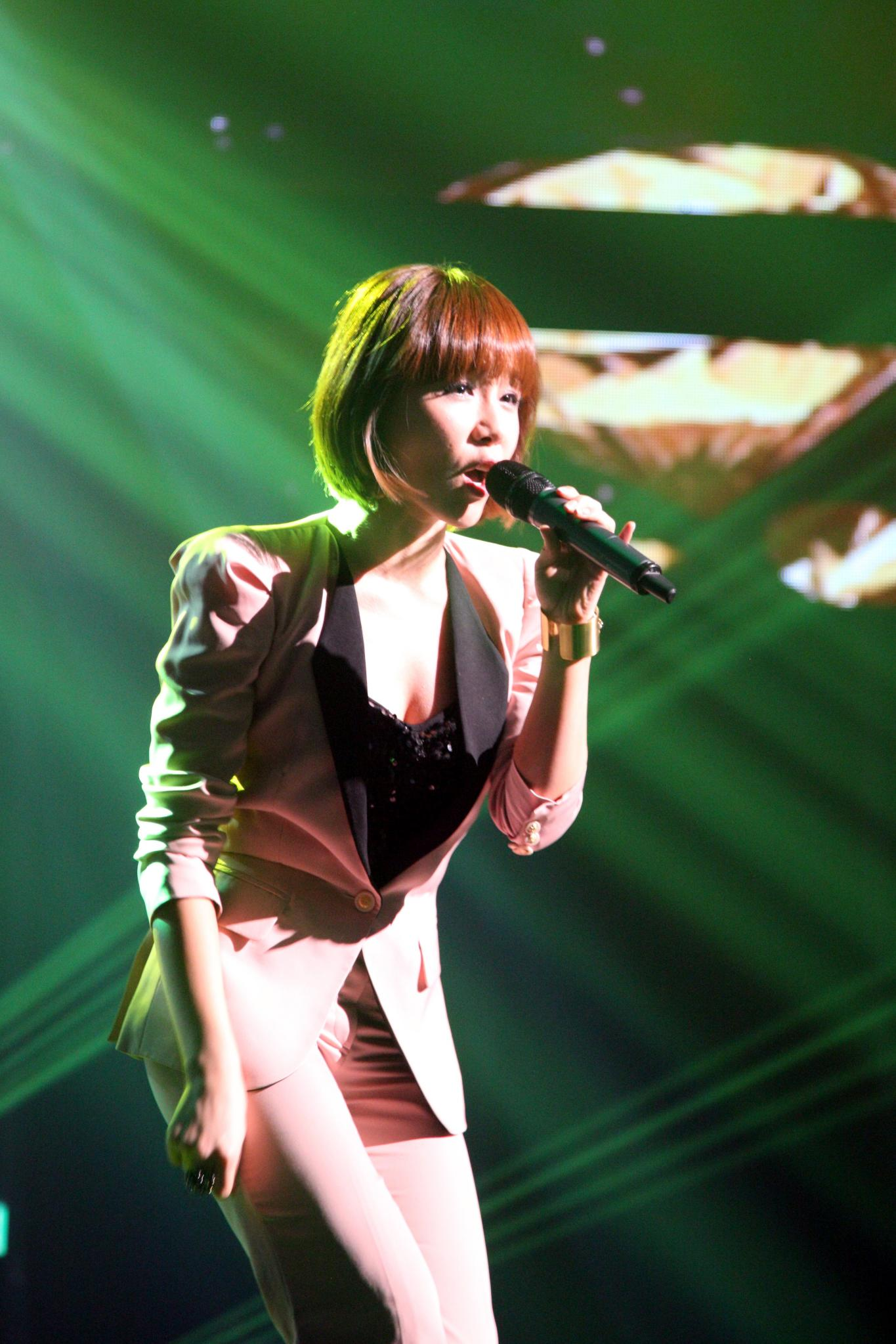
Lim Jeong-hee, (2005)

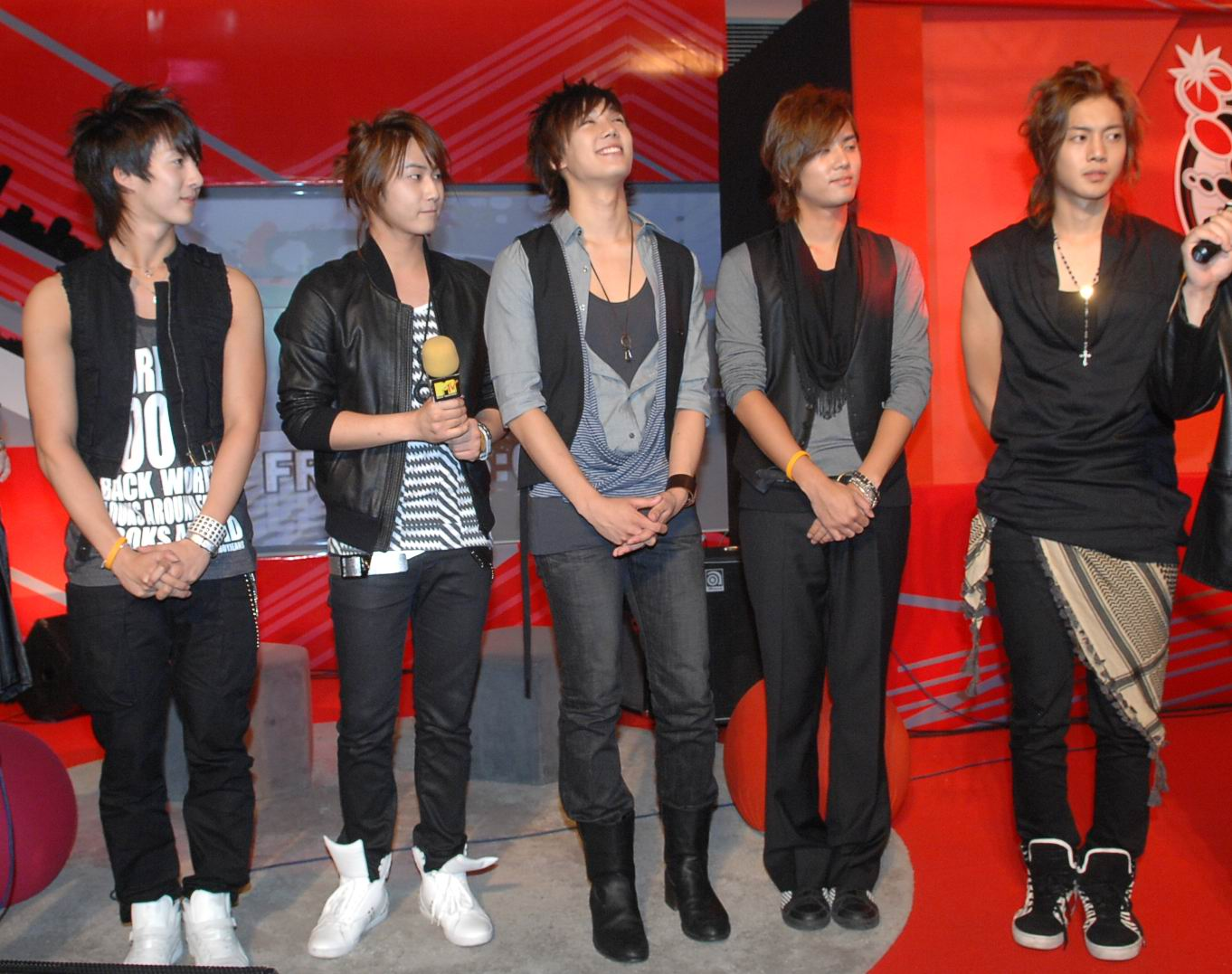
SS501, (2005)

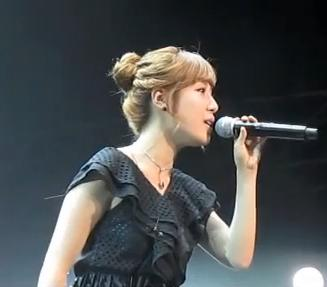
Zhang Liyin, (2006)

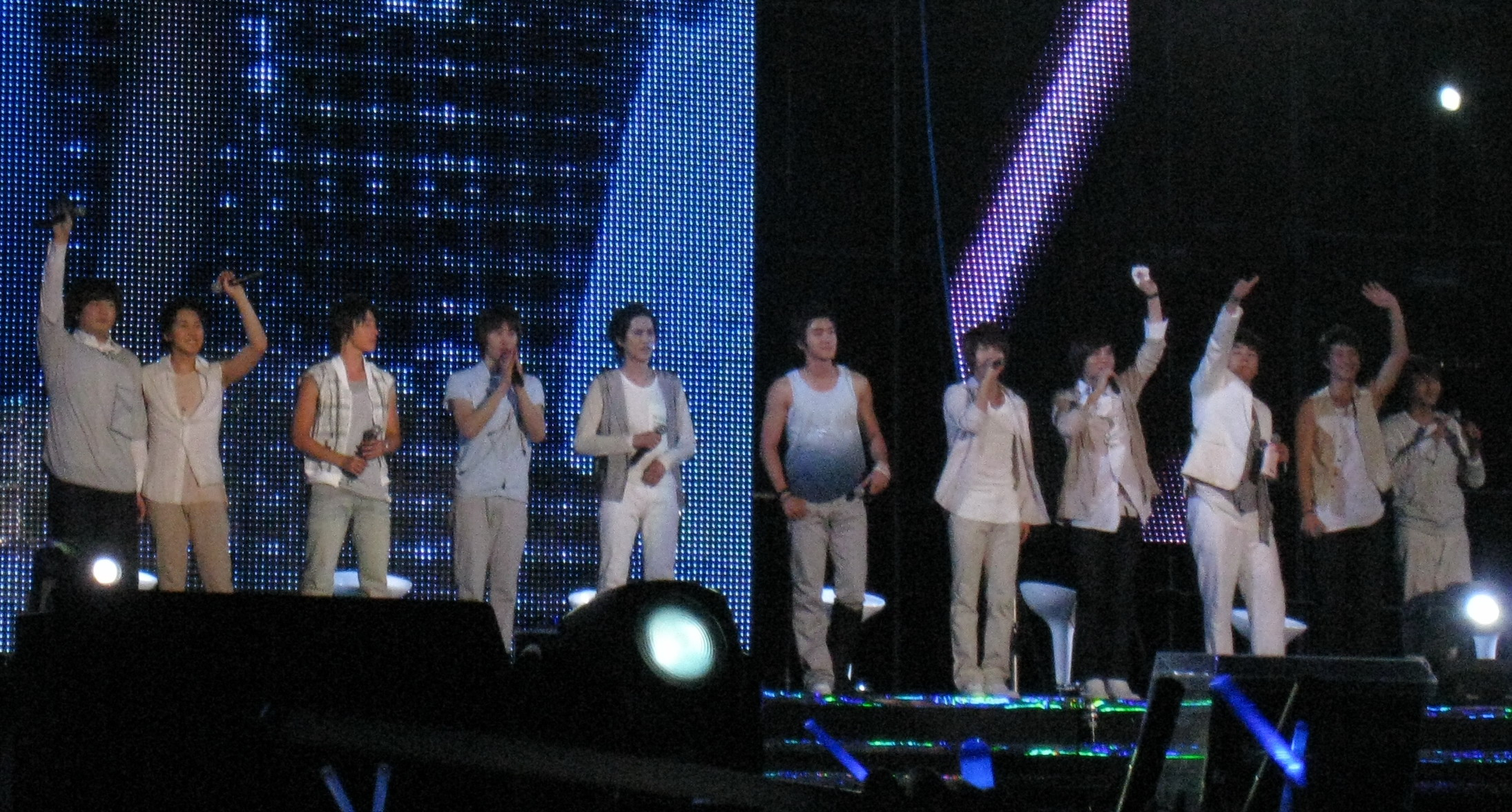
Super Junior, (2006)

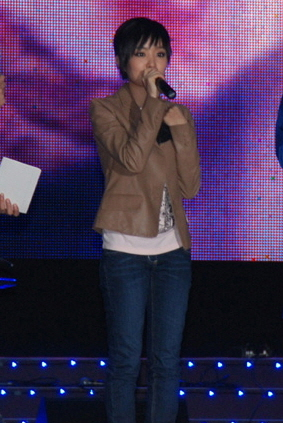
Younha, (2007)

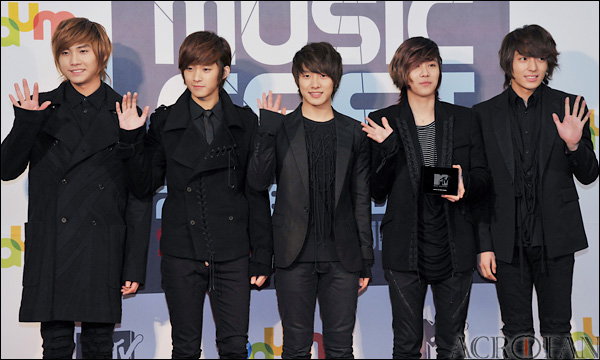
F.T. Island, (2007)

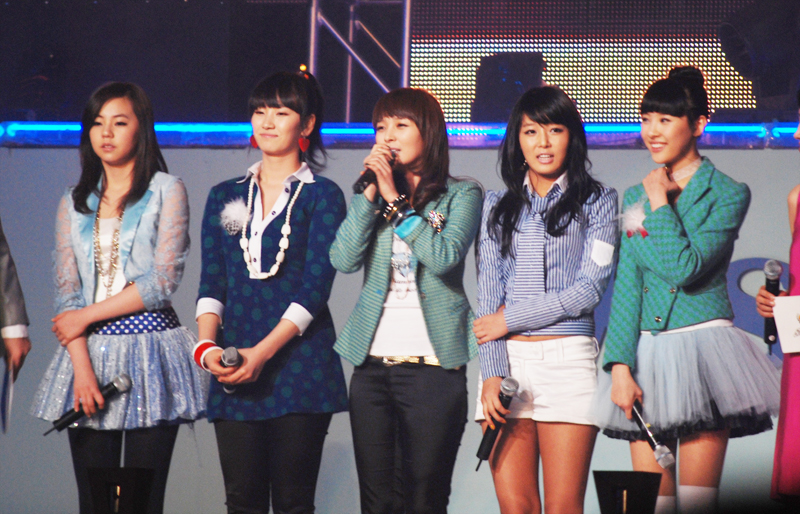
Wonder Girls, (2007)

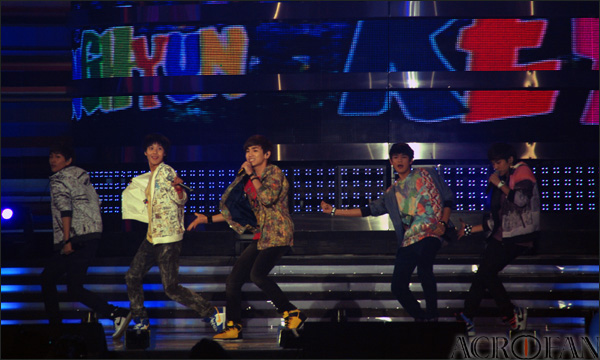
Shinee, (2008)

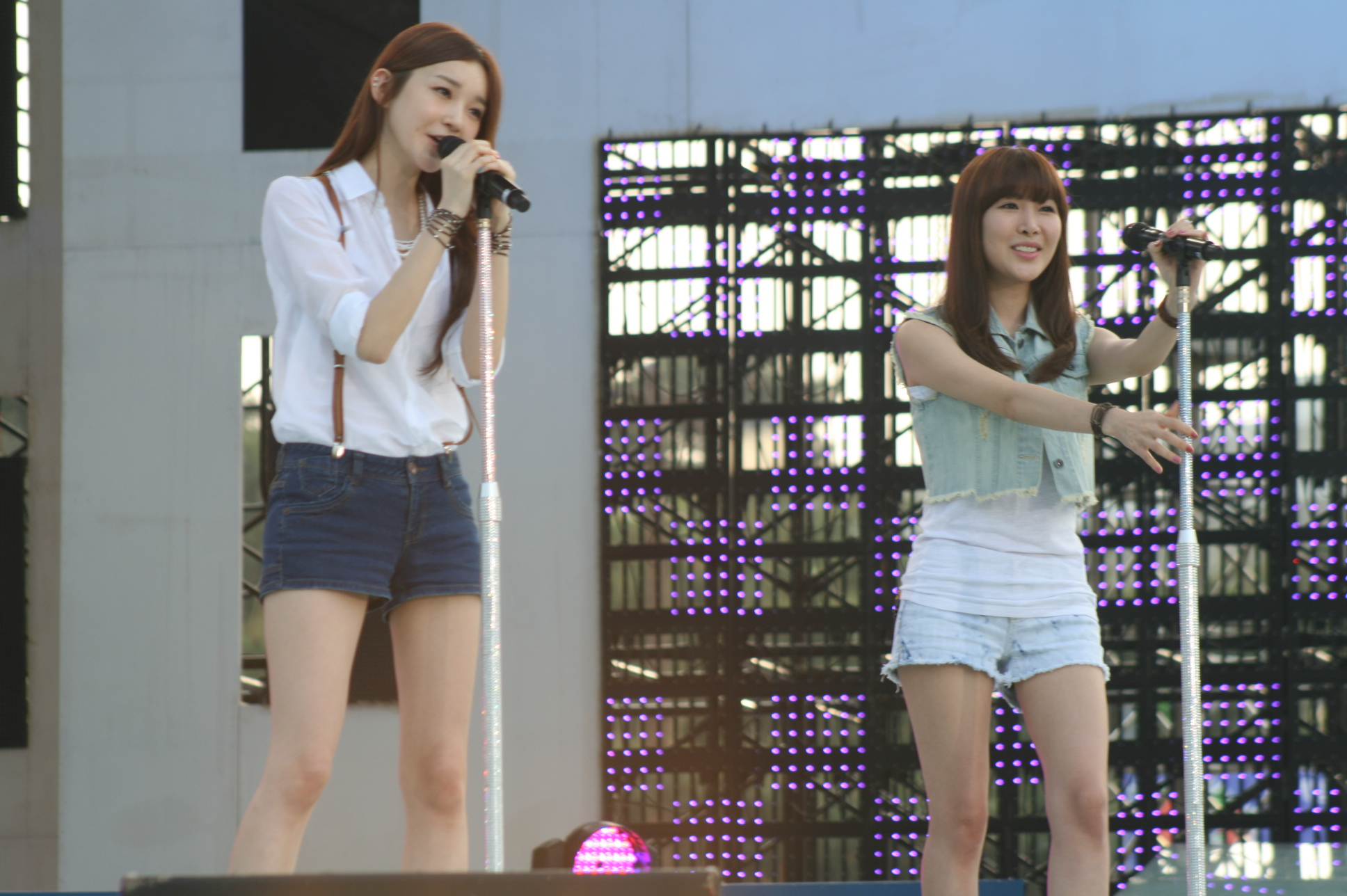
Davichi, (2008)

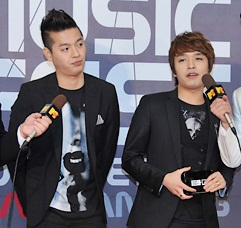
Supreme Team, (2009)

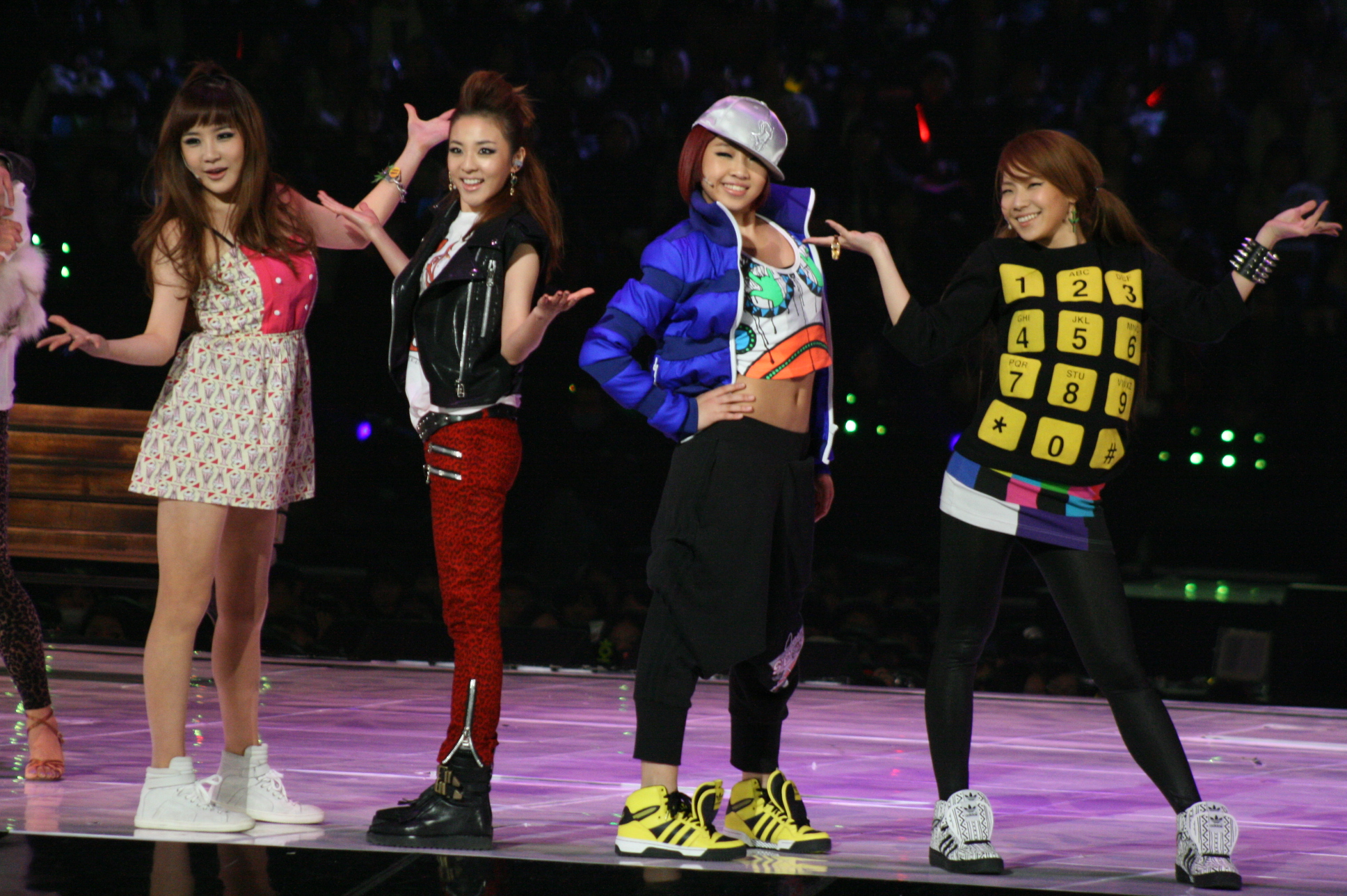
2NE1, (2009)

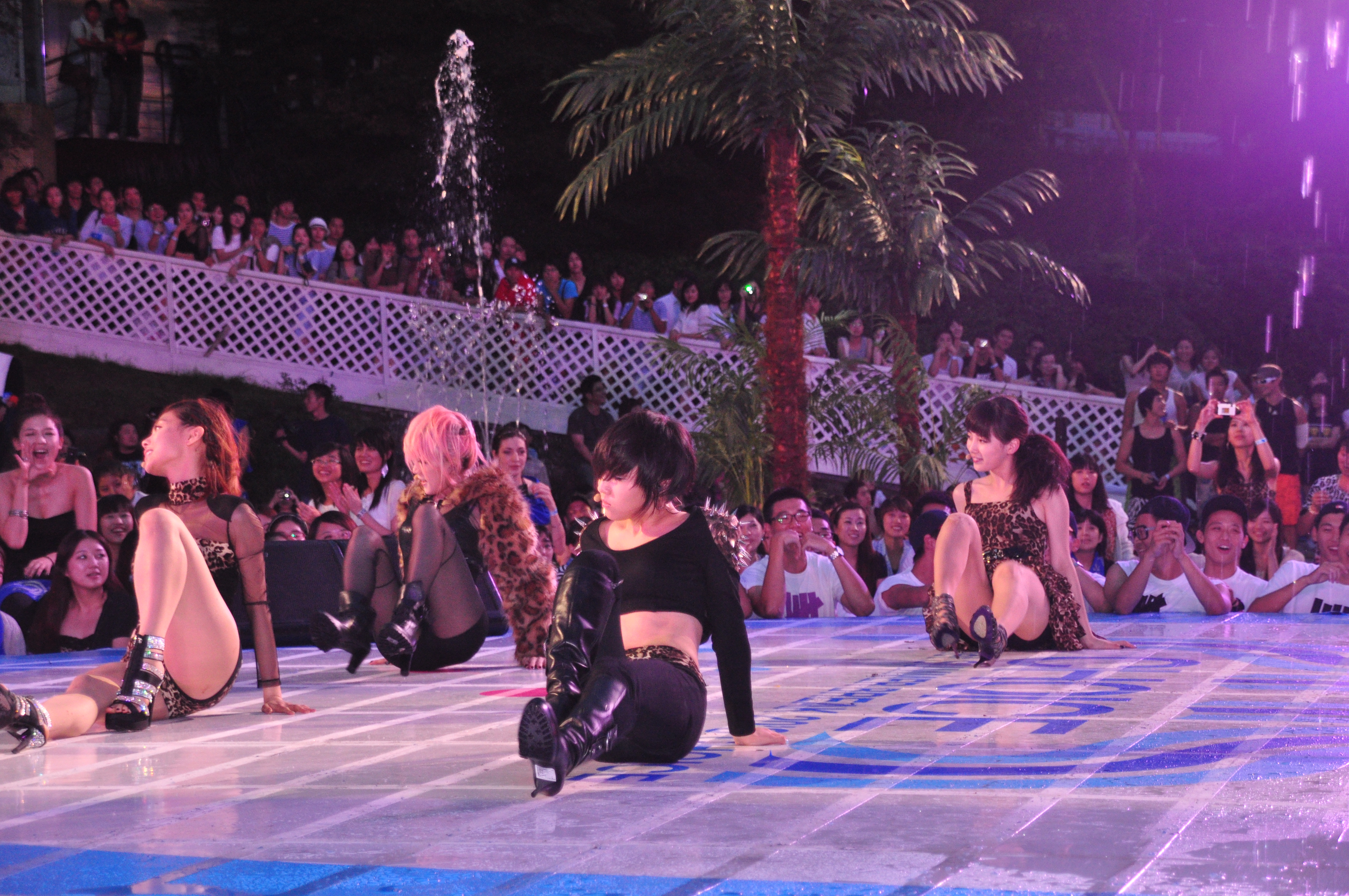
Miss A, (2010)

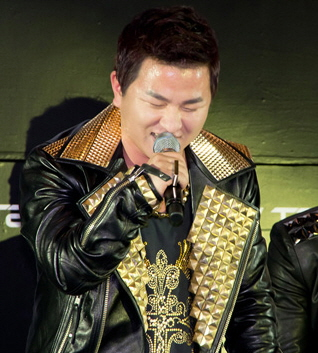
Huh Gak, (2011)

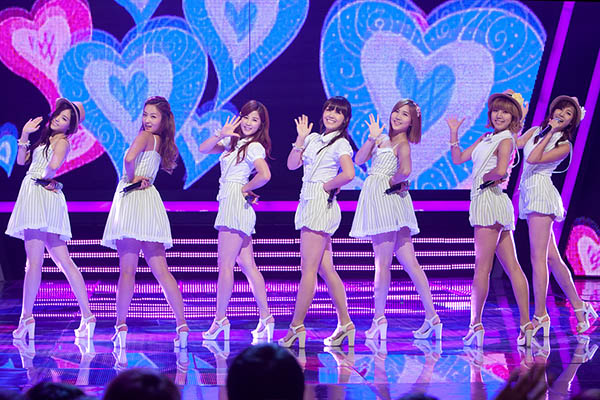
Apink, (2011)

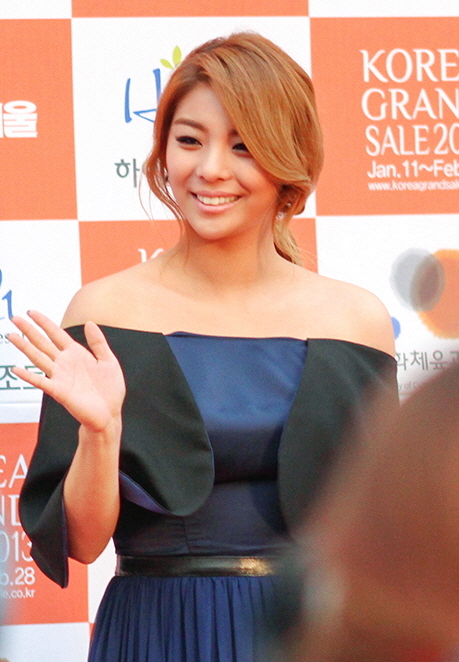
Ailee, (2012)

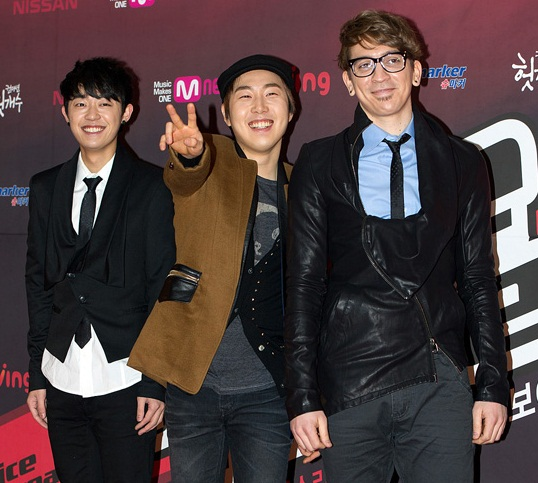
Busker Busker, (2012)

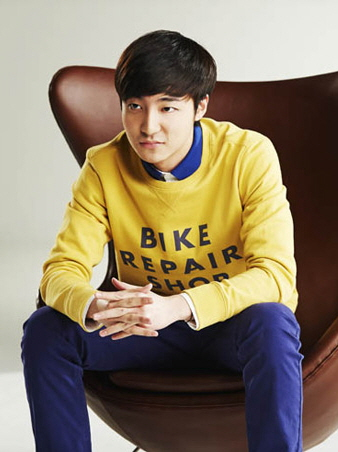
Roy Kim, (2013)

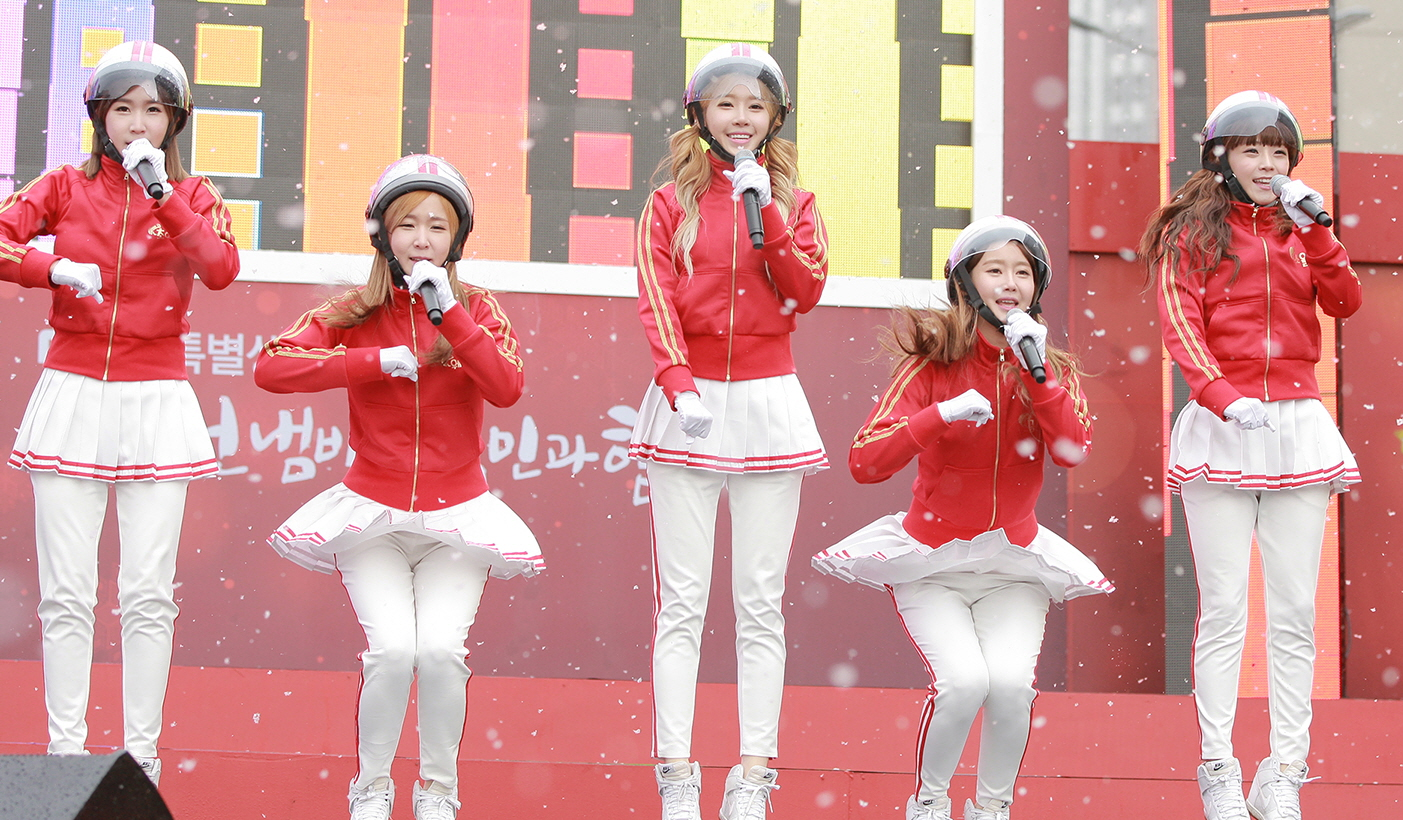
Crayon Pop, (2013)

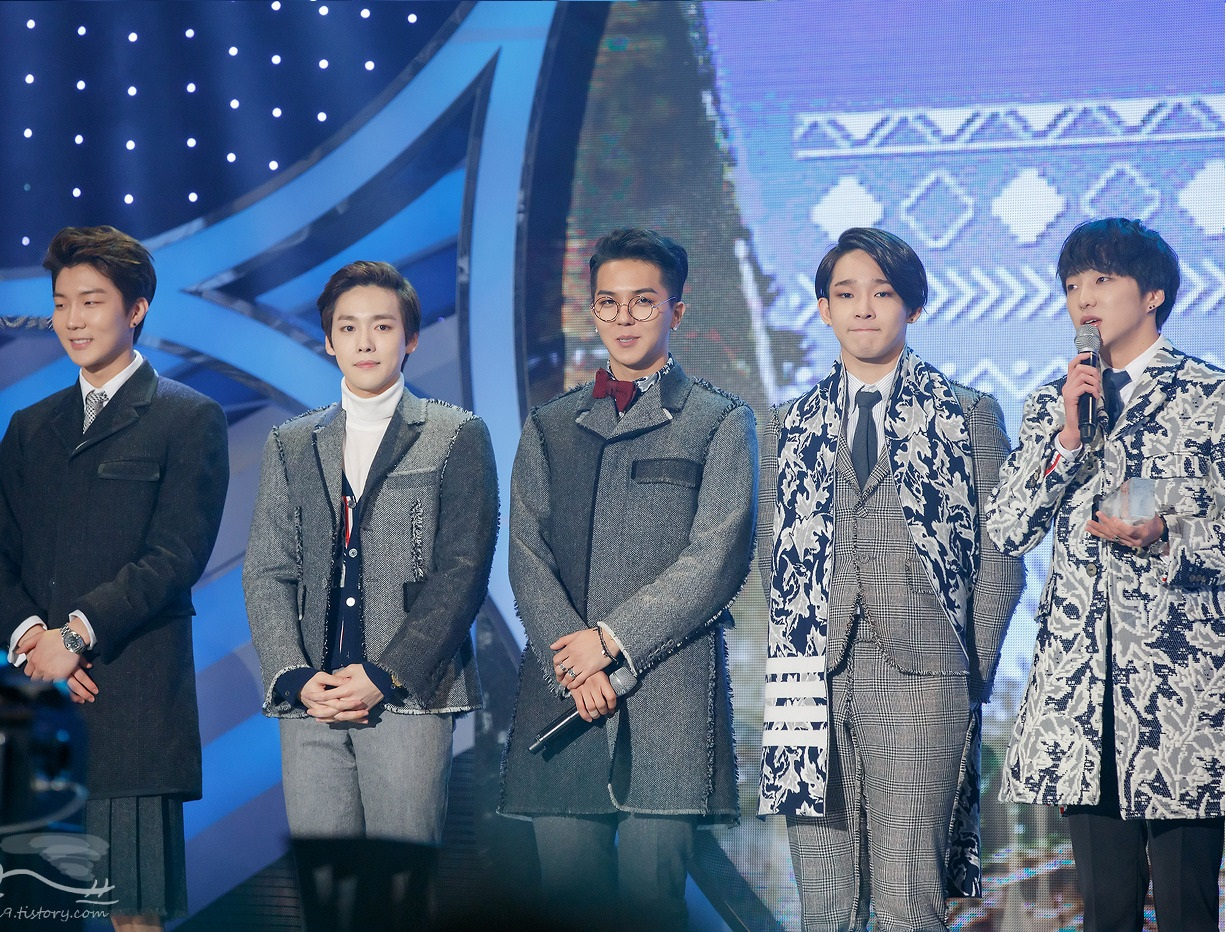
Winner, (2014)

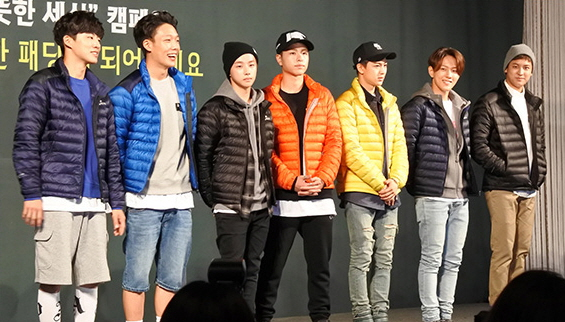
iKon, (2015)

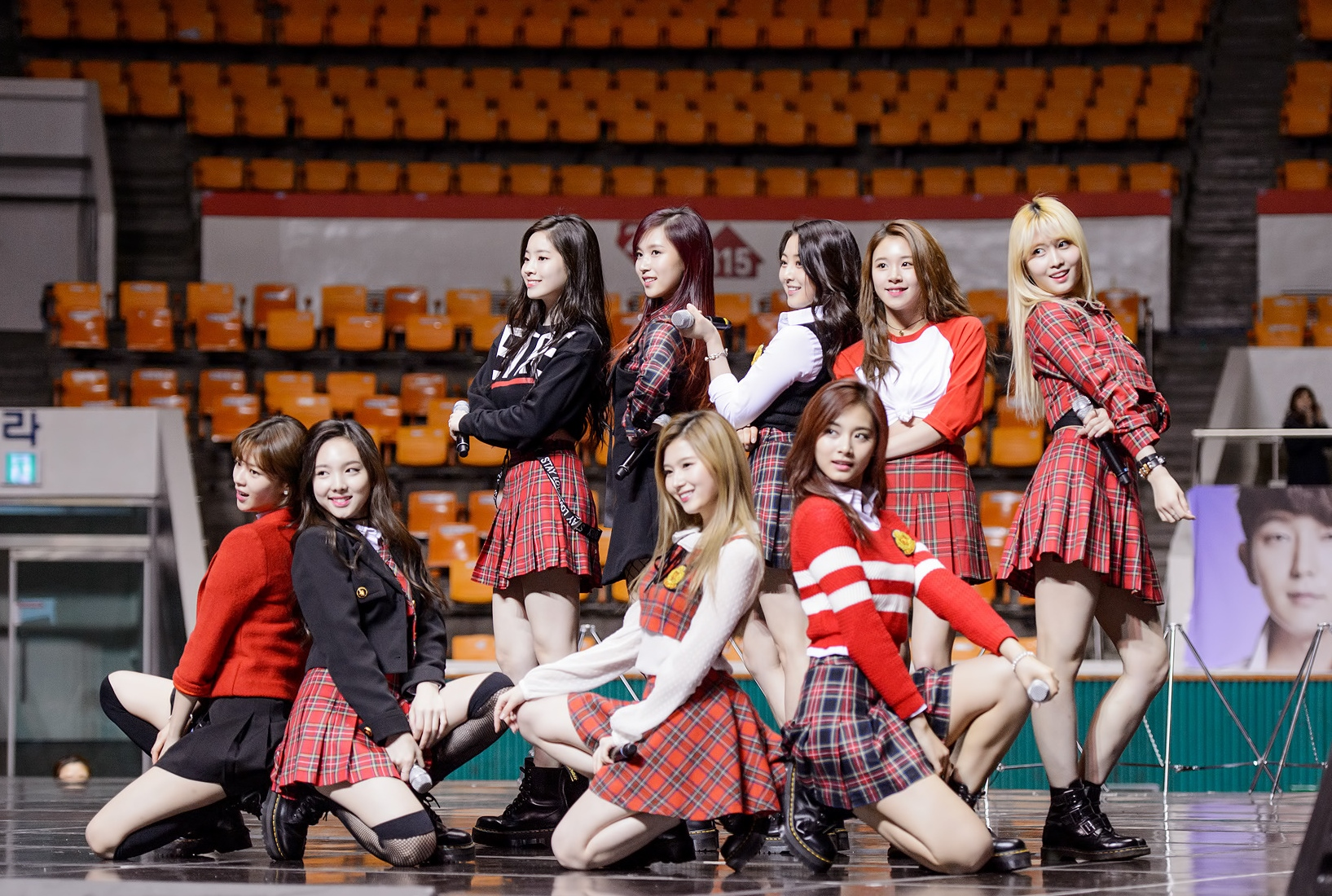
Twice, (2015)

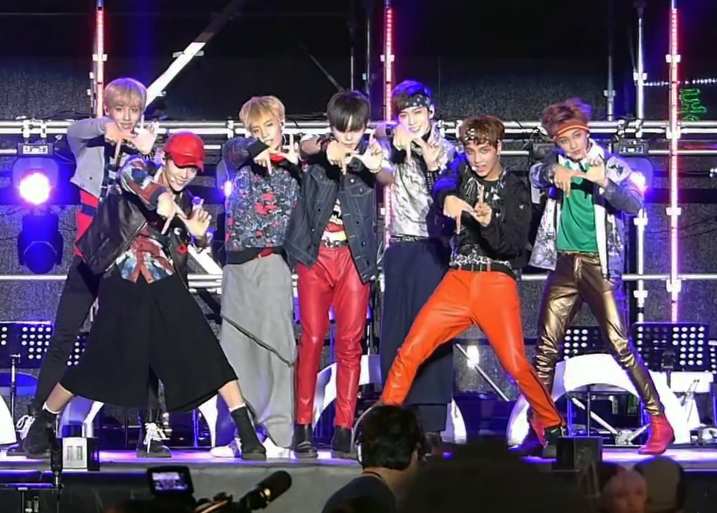
NCT 127, (2016)

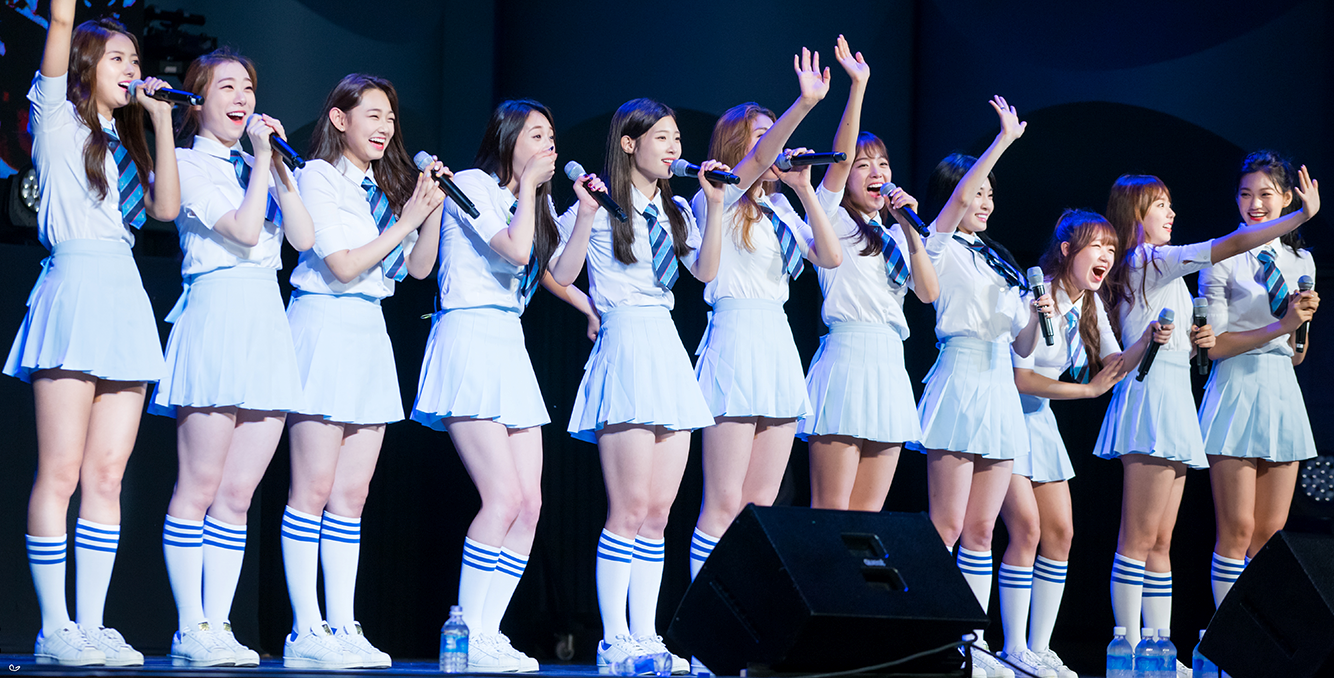
I.O.I, (2016)

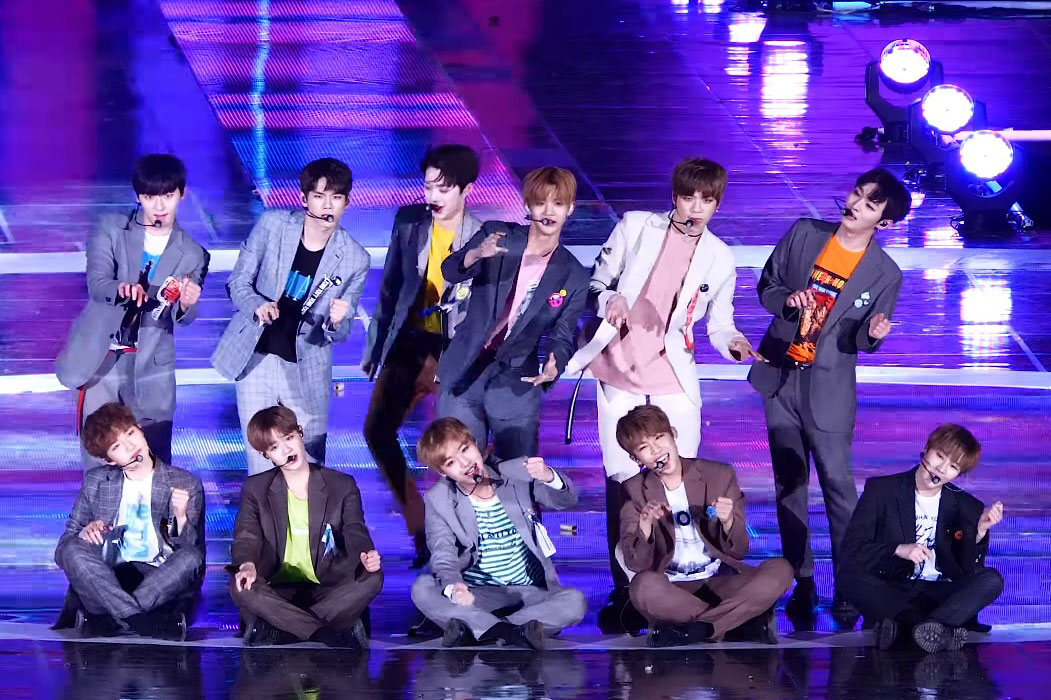
Wanna One, (2017)

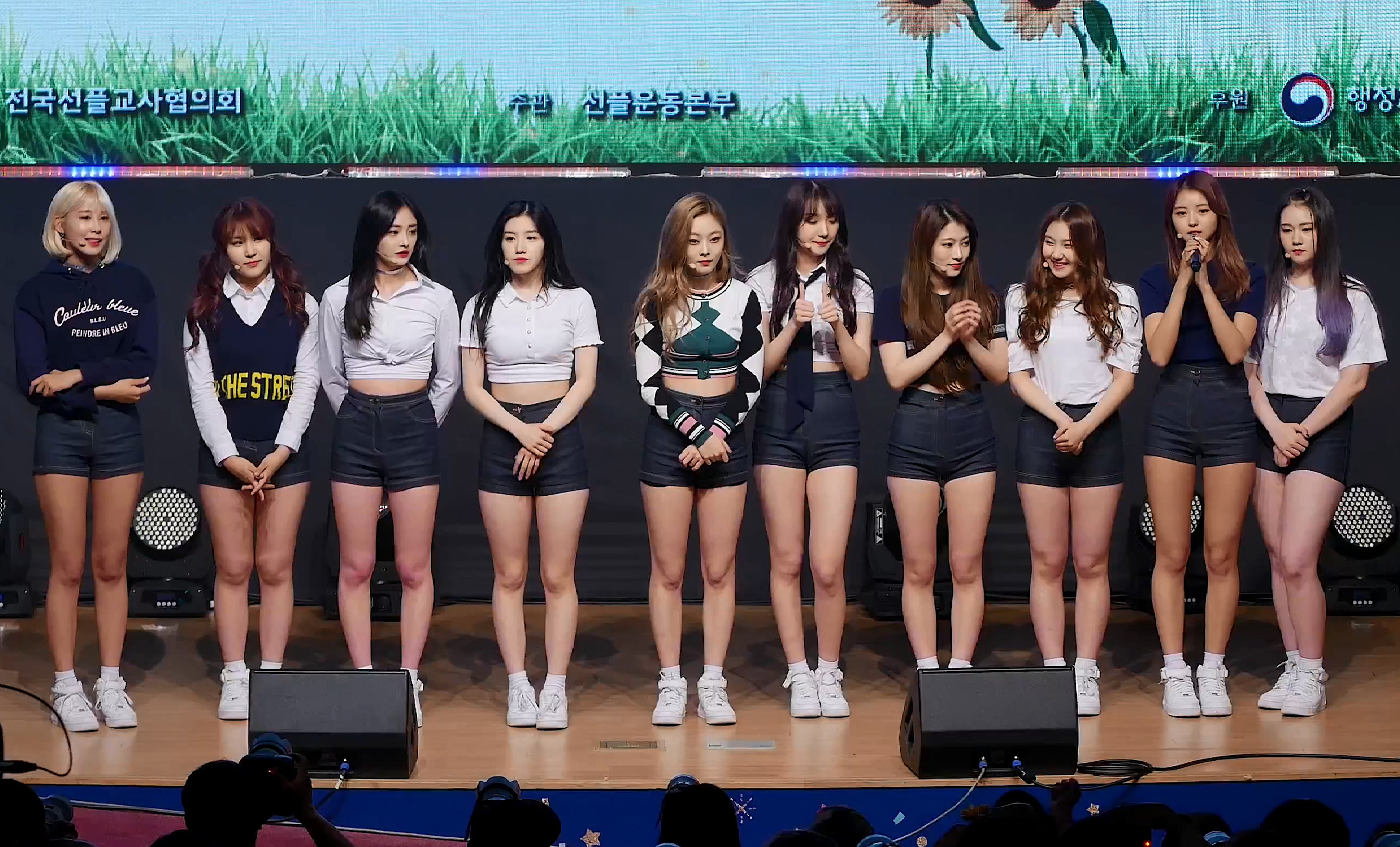
Pristin, (2017)

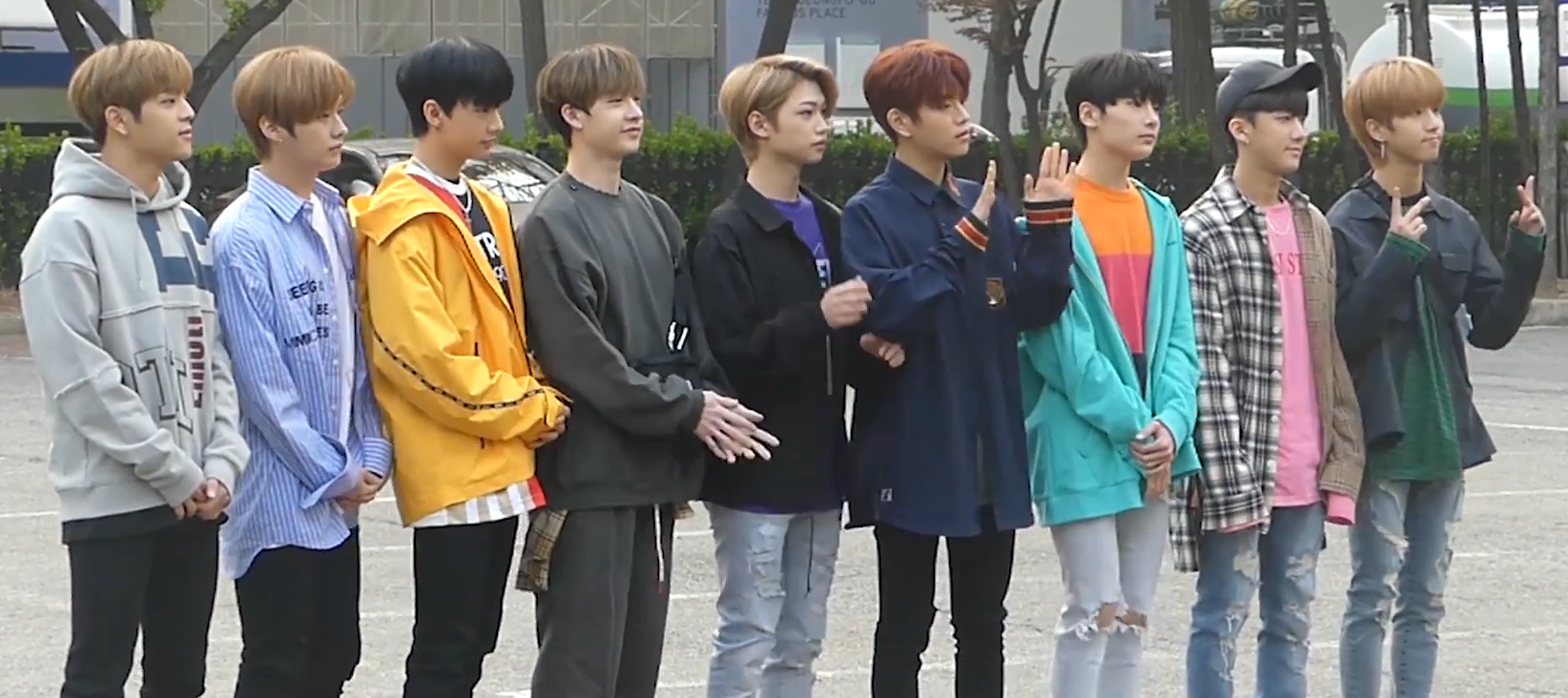
Stray Kids, (2018)

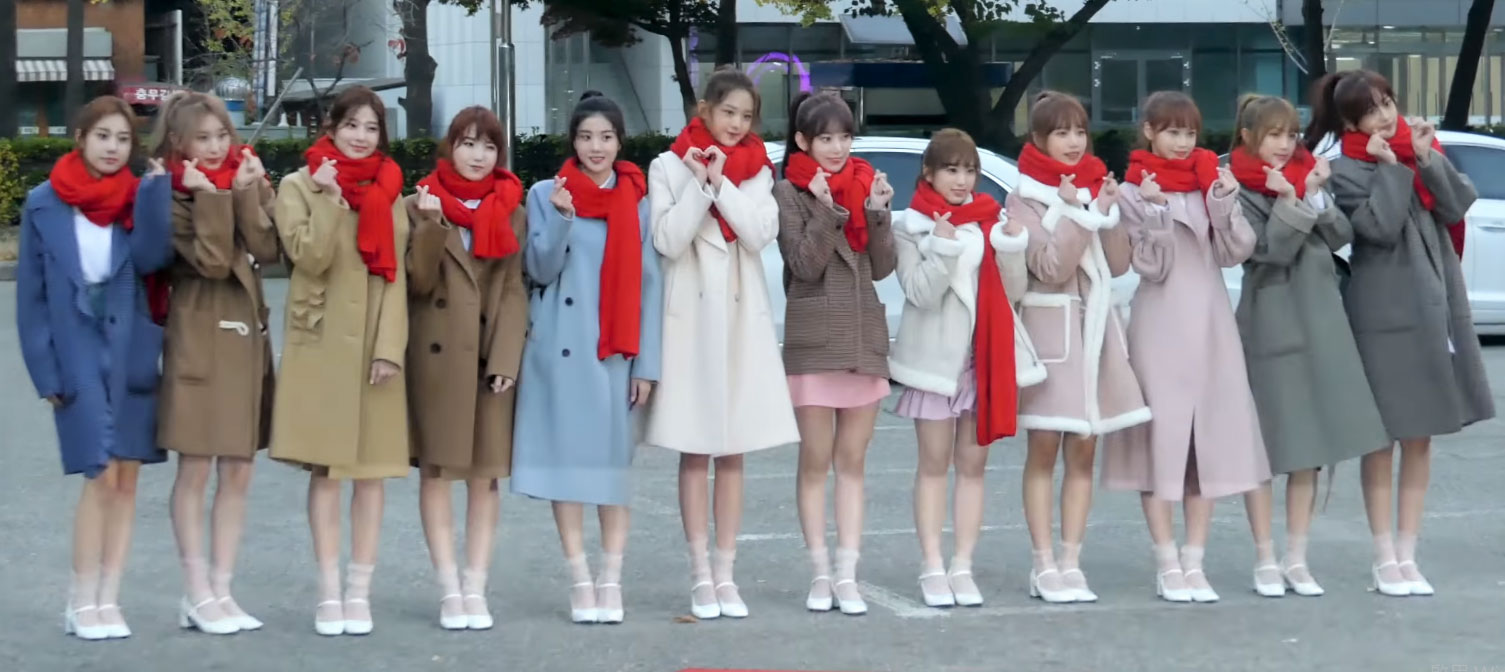
Iz*One, (2018)

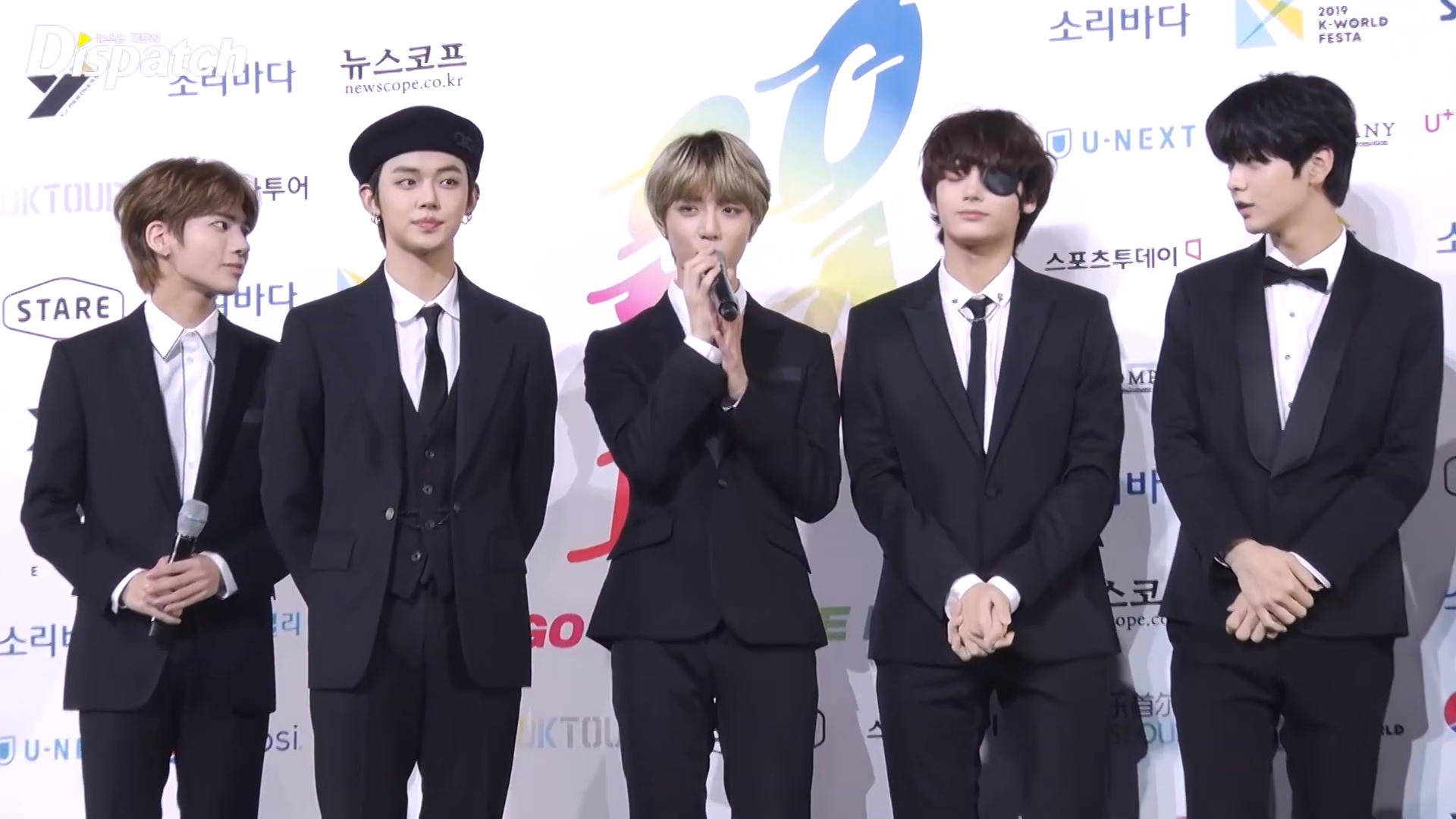
TXT, (2019)

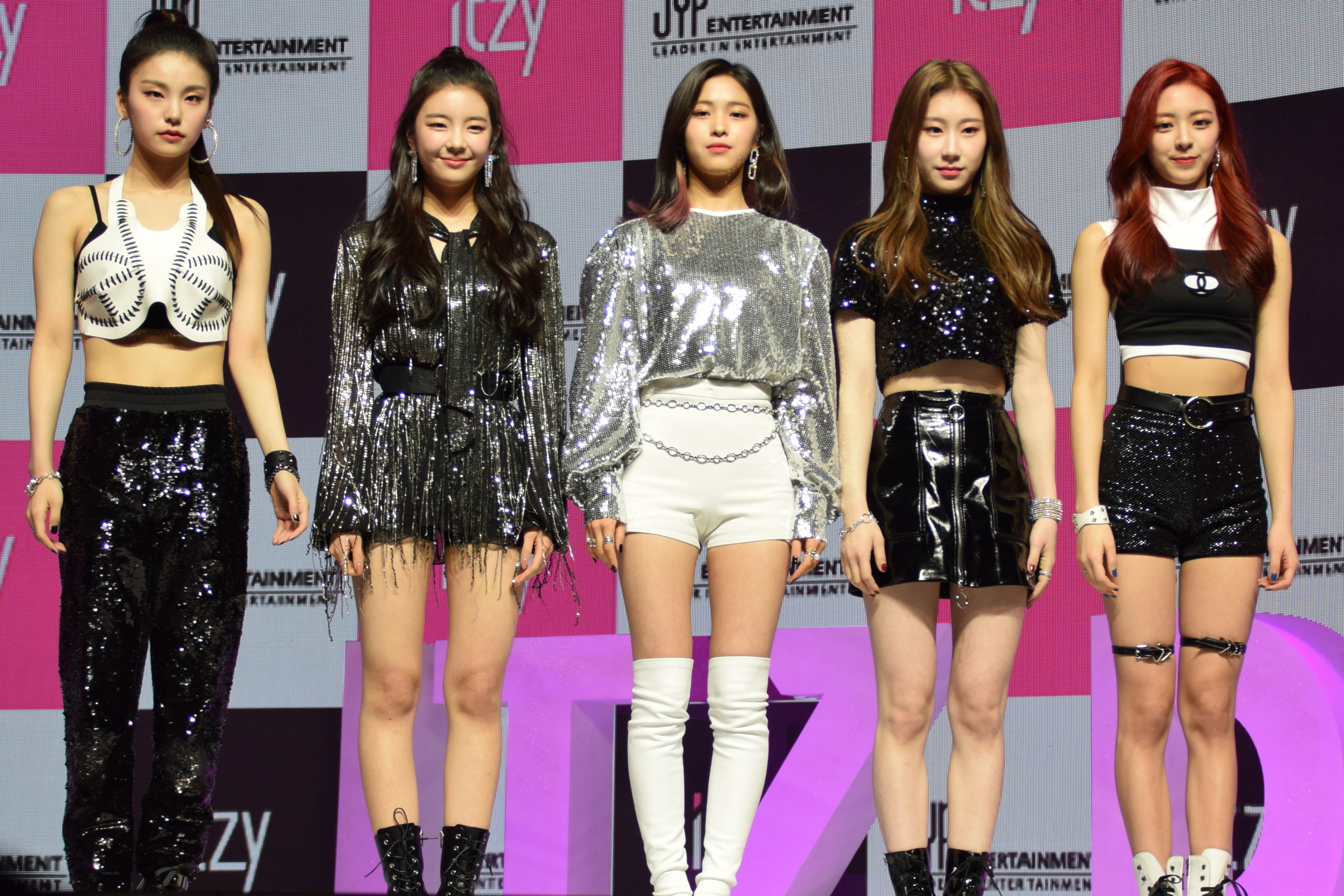
Itzy, (2019)

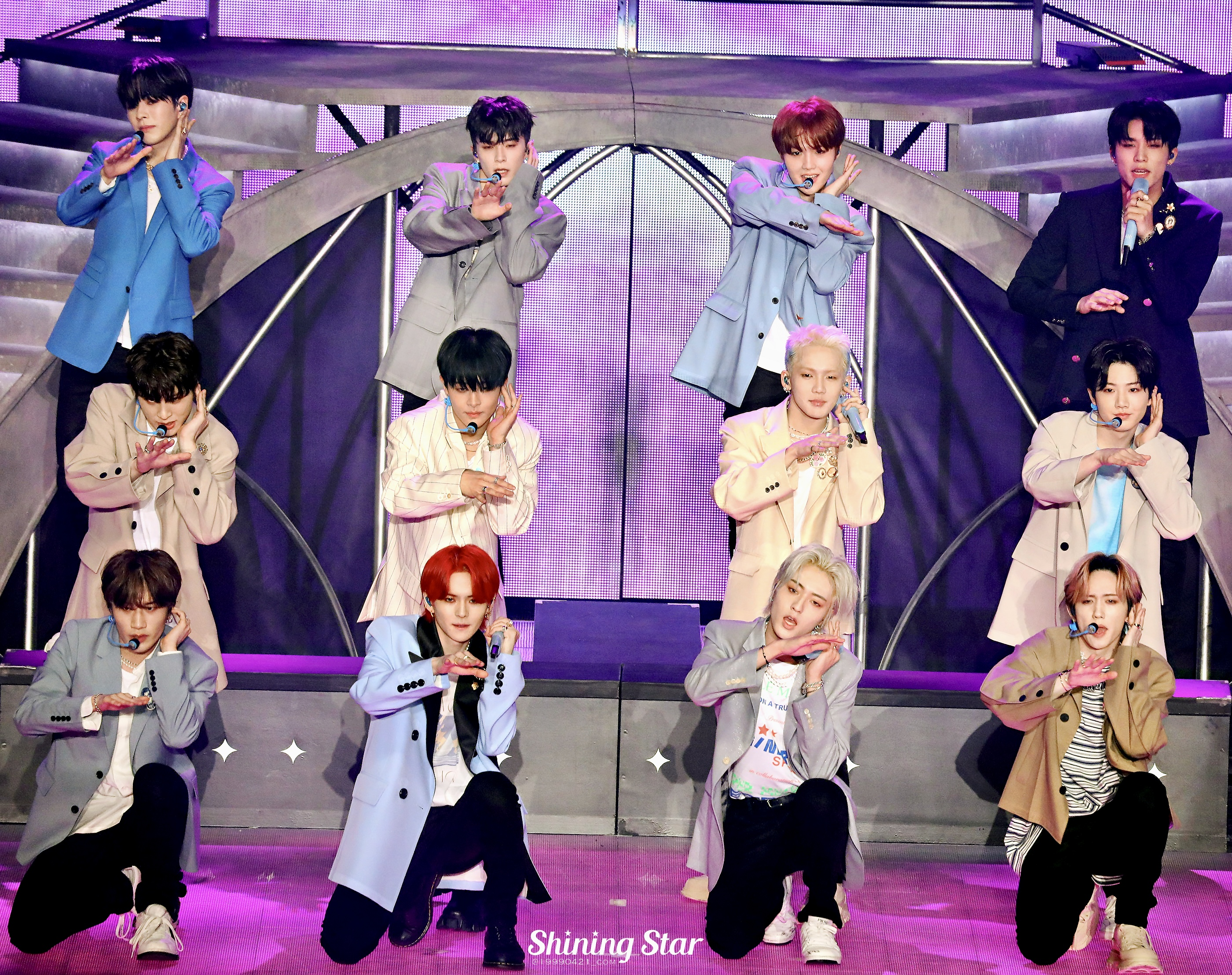
Treasure, (2020)

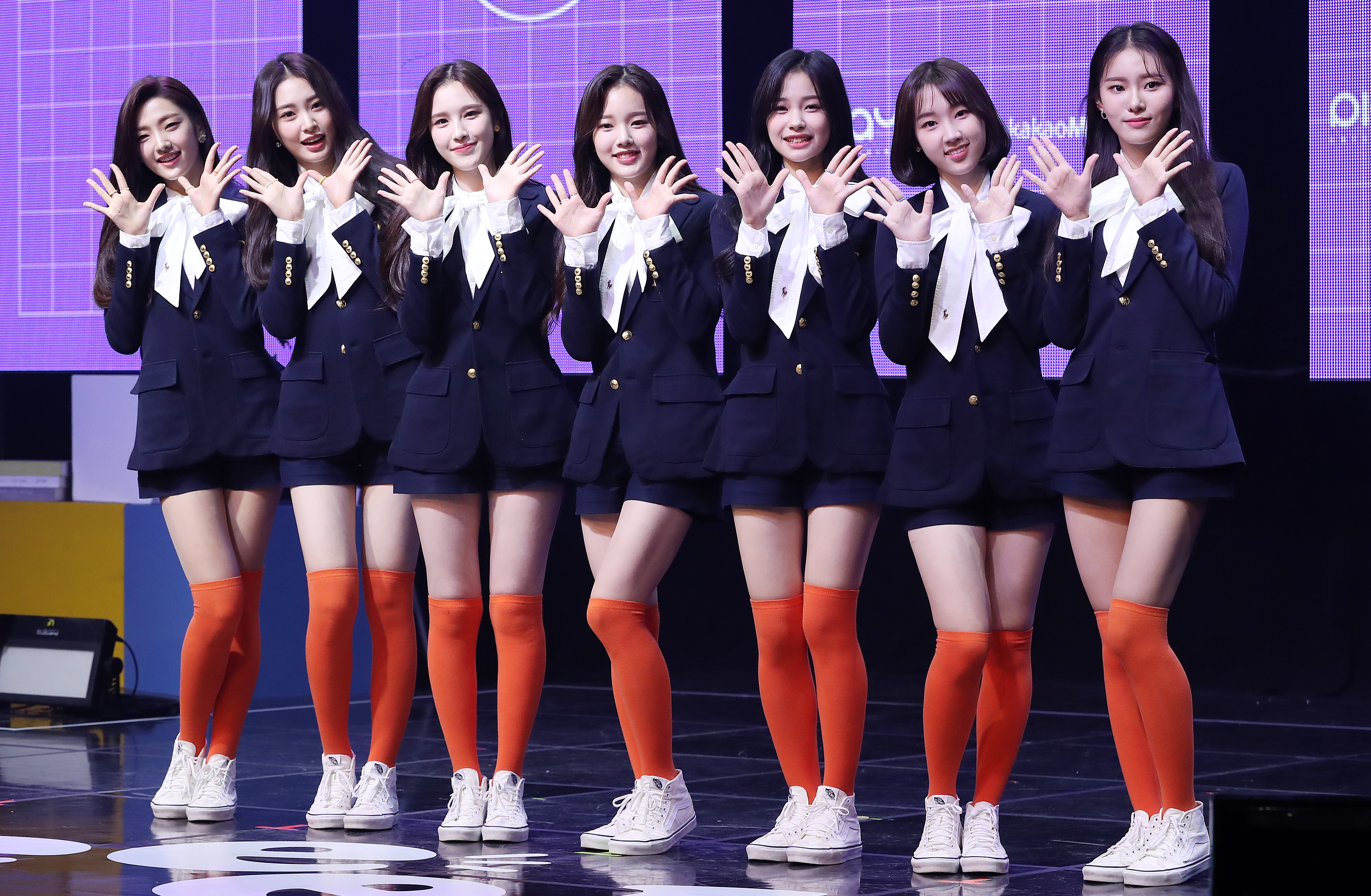
Weeekly, (2020)

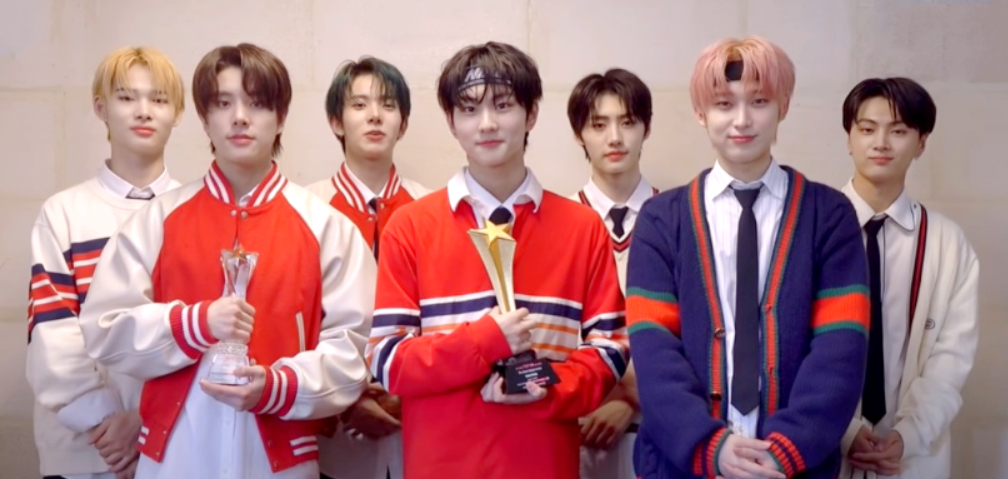
Enhypen, (2021)

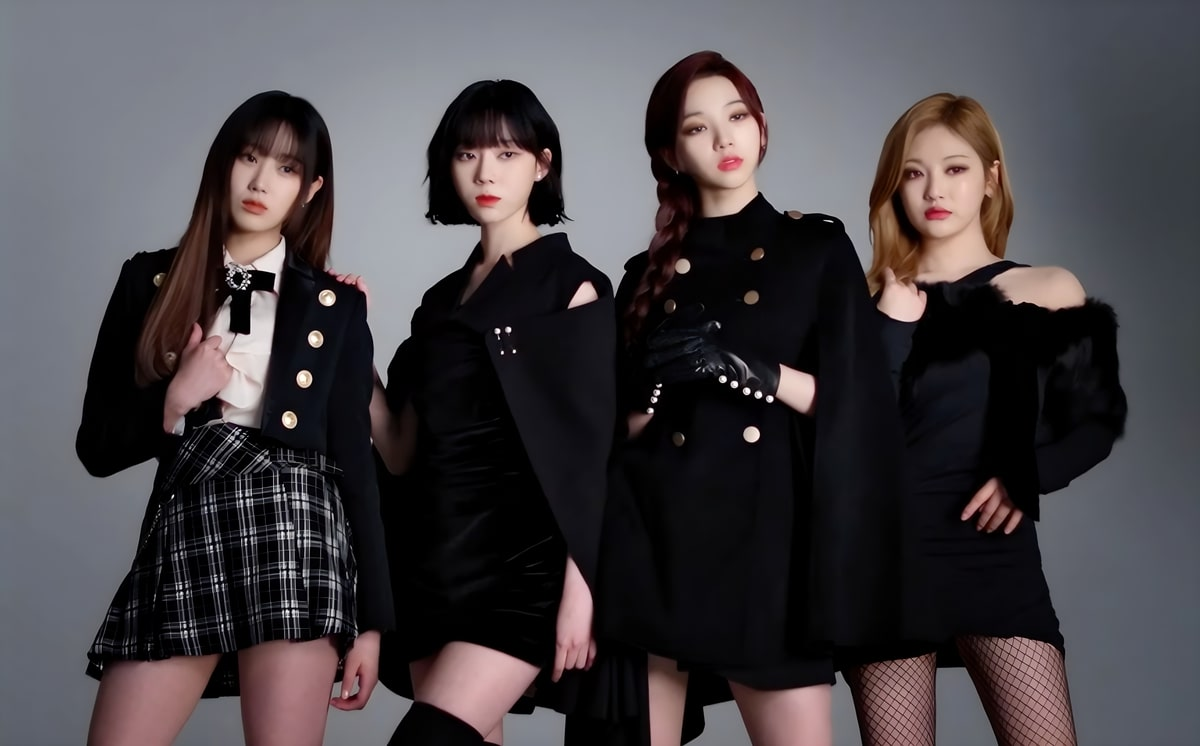
Aespa, (2021)

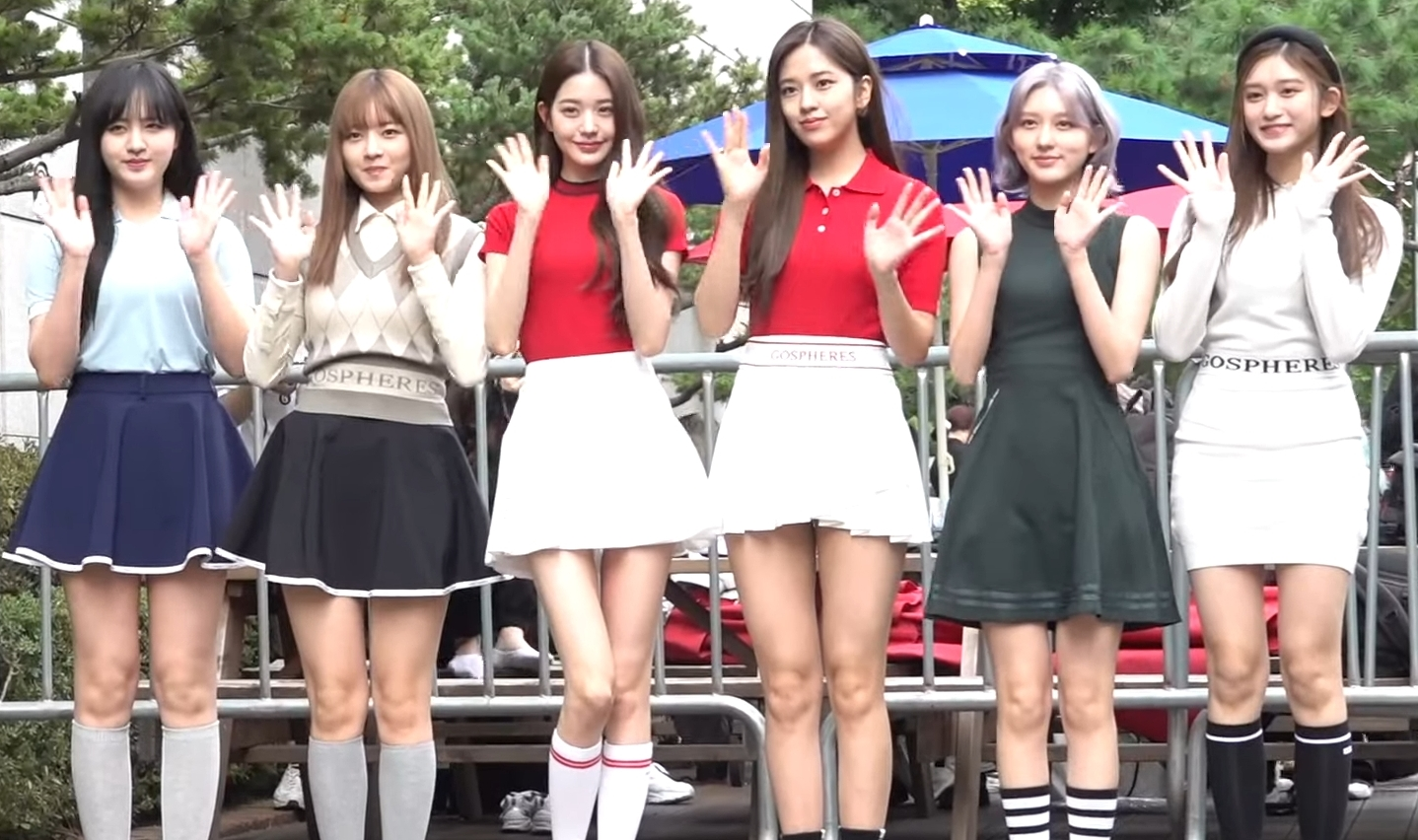
Ive, (2022)

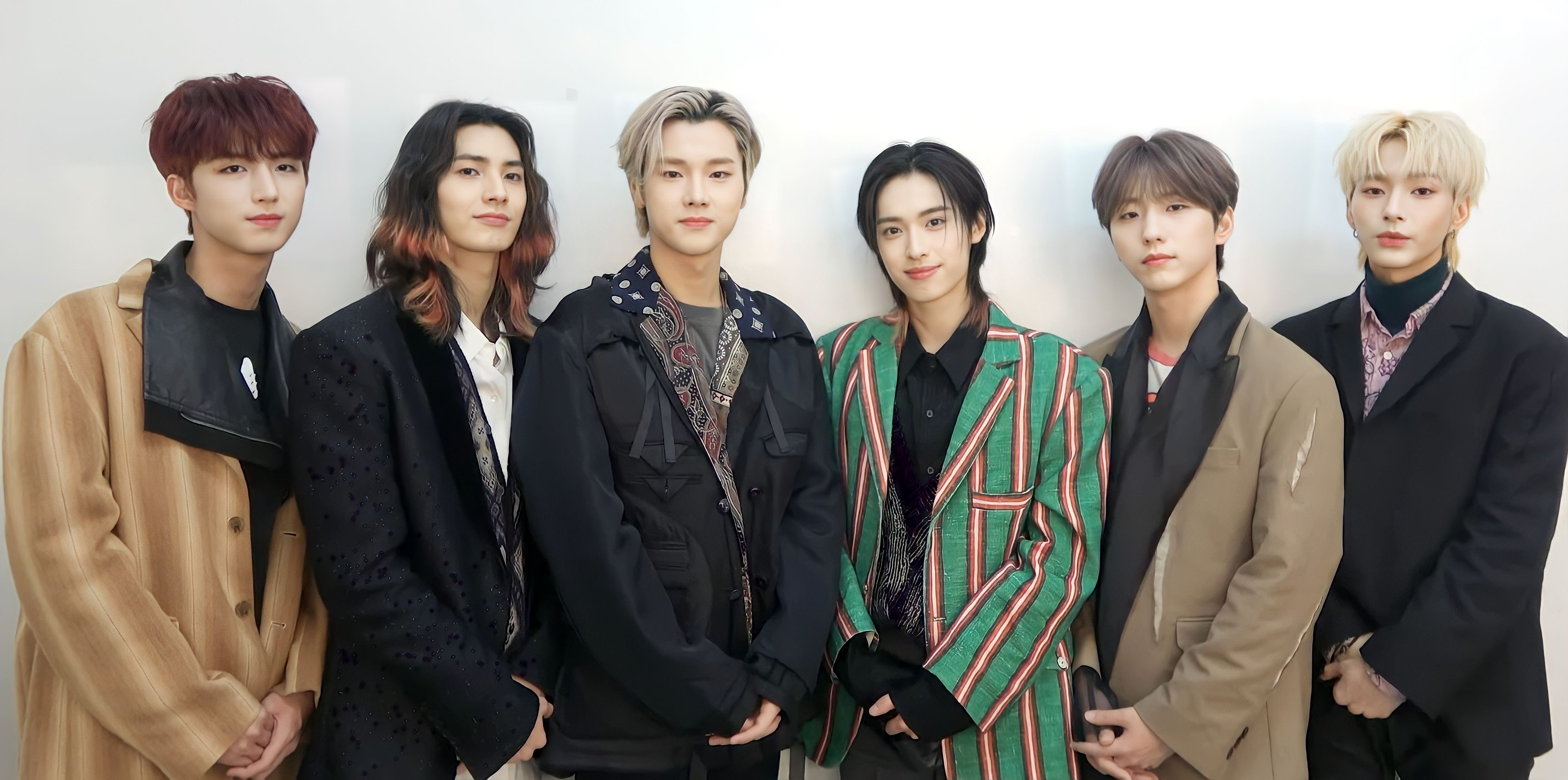
Xdinary Heroes, (2022)

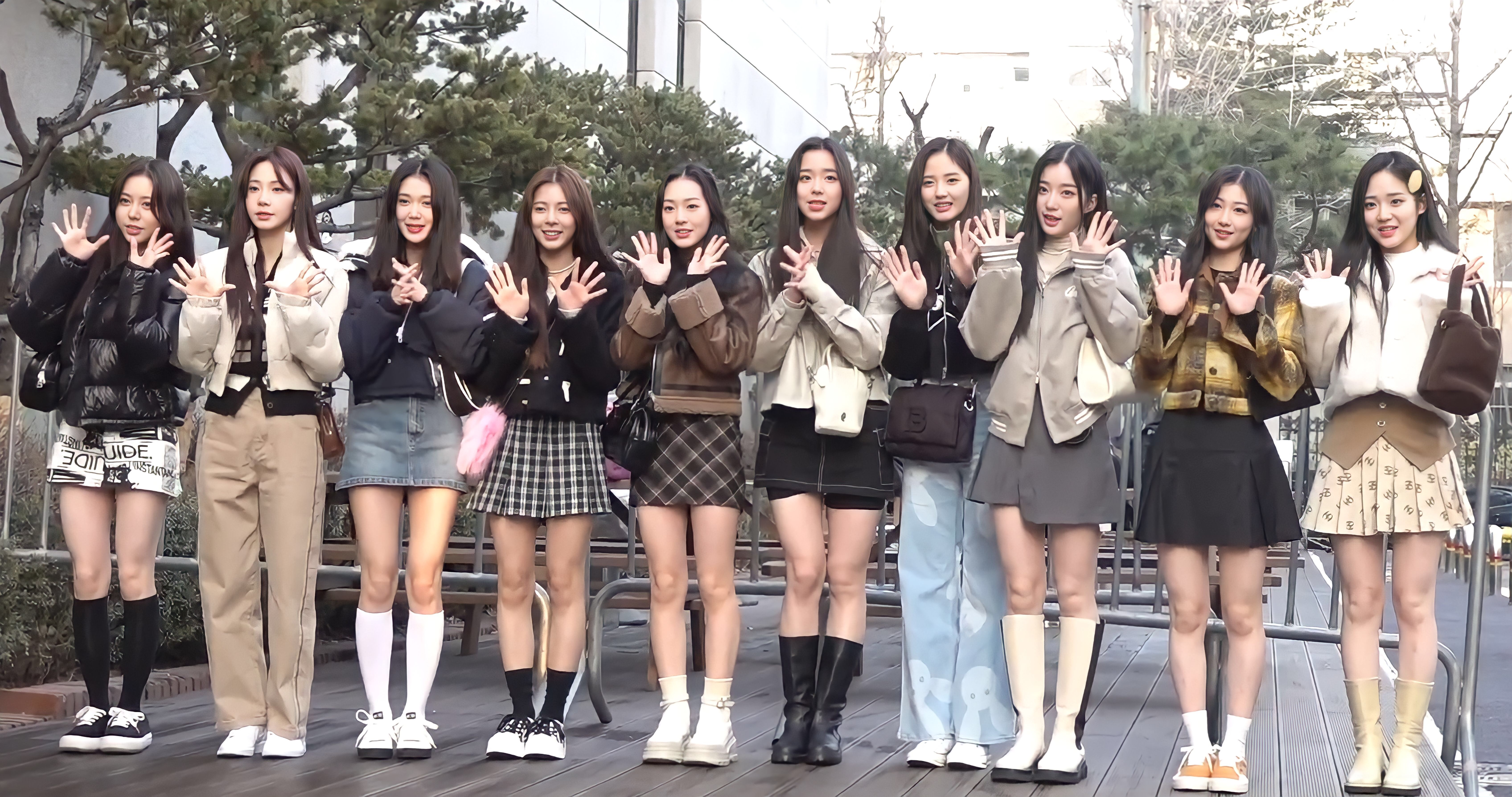
TripleS, (2023)

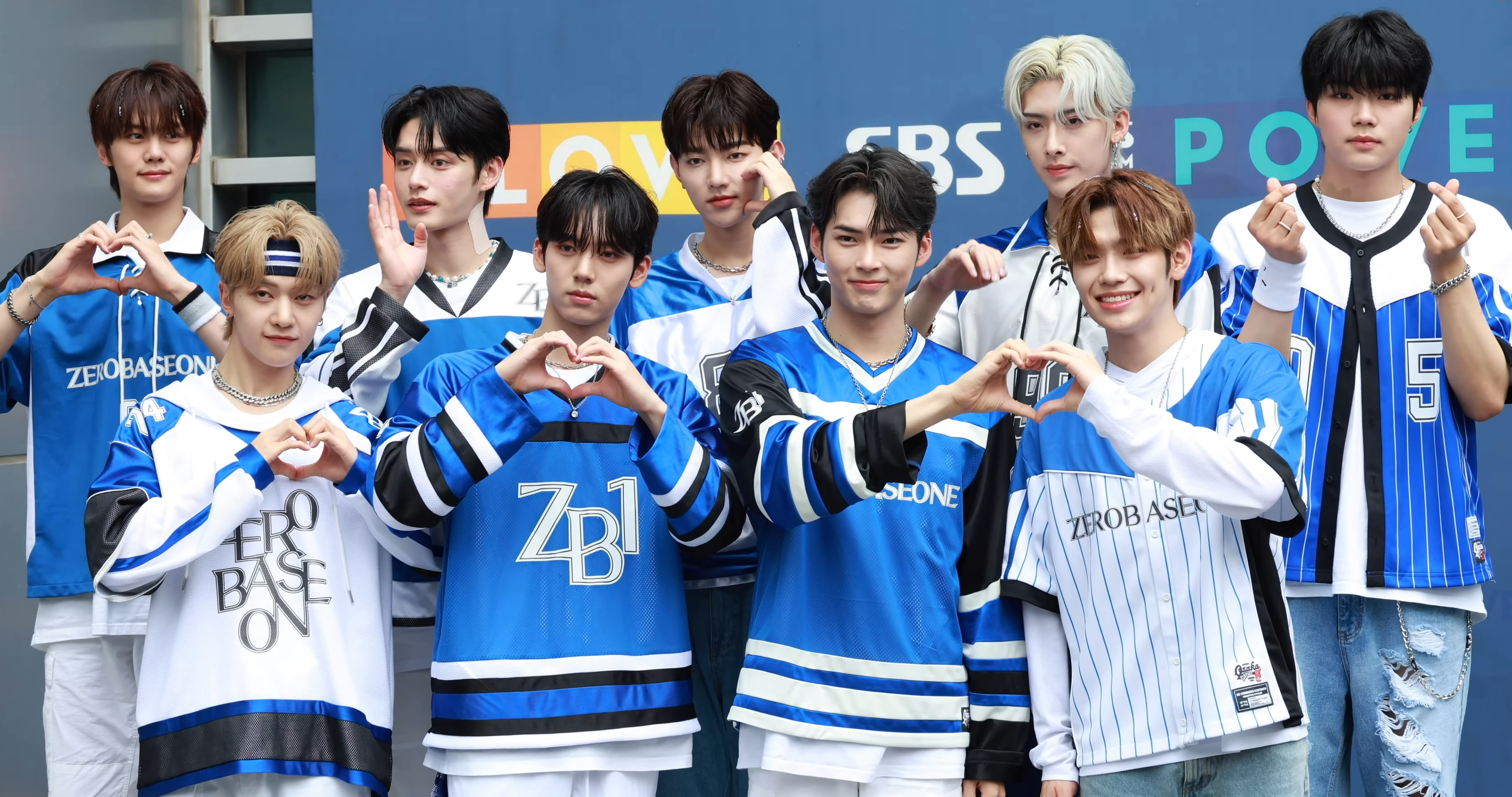
Zerobaseone, (2023)

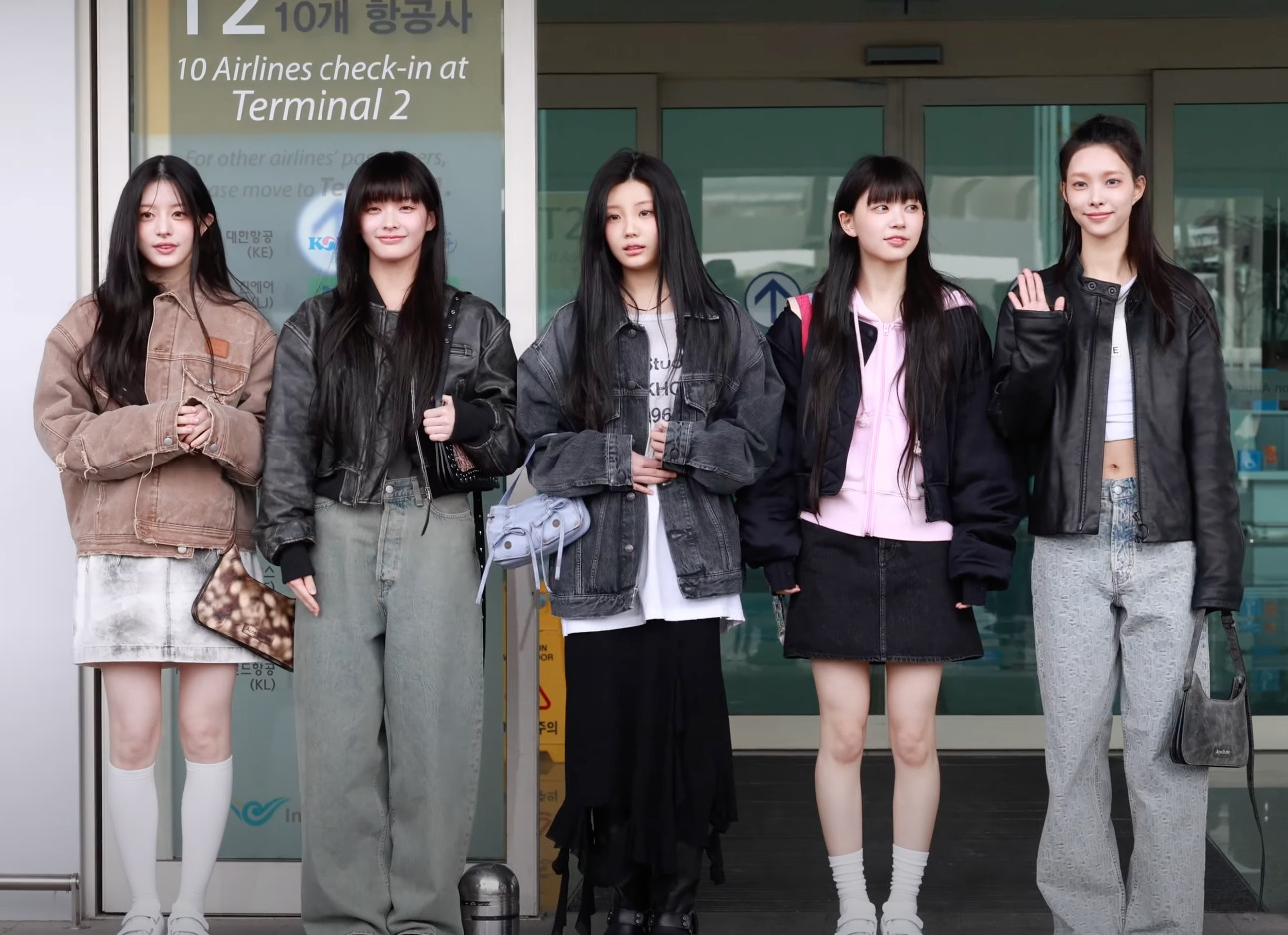
Illit, (2024)

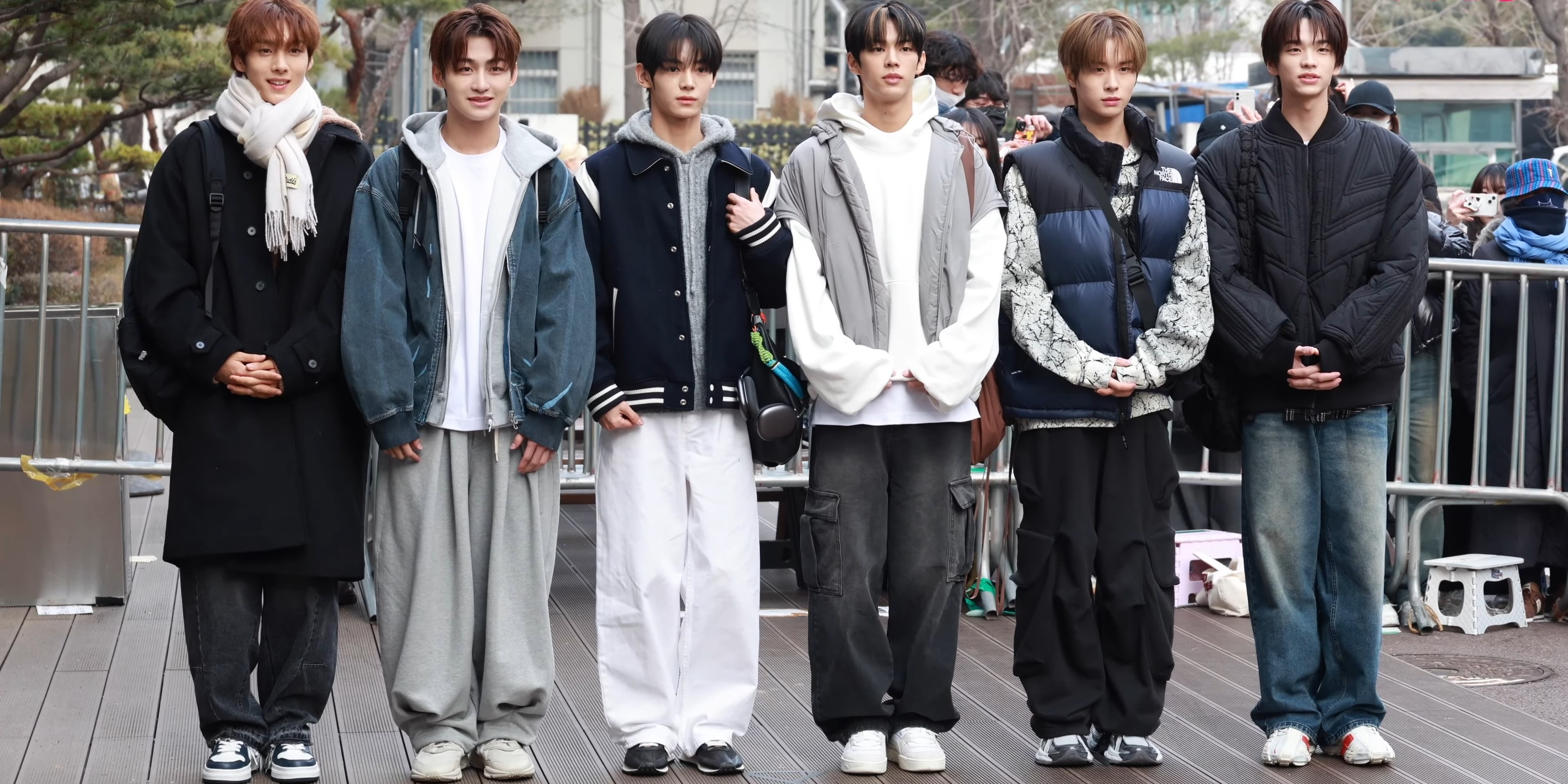
TWS, (2024)

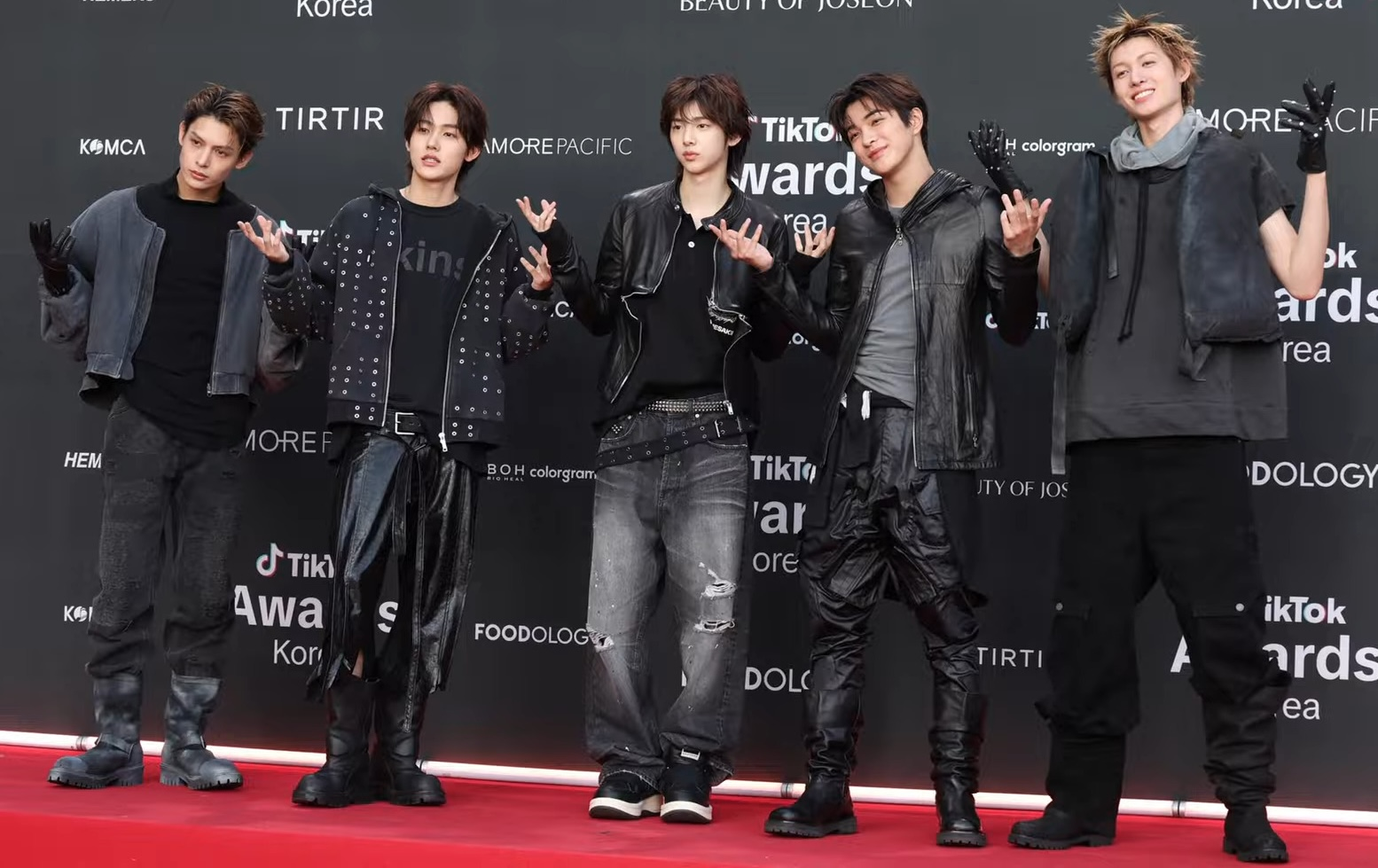
Cortis, (2025)

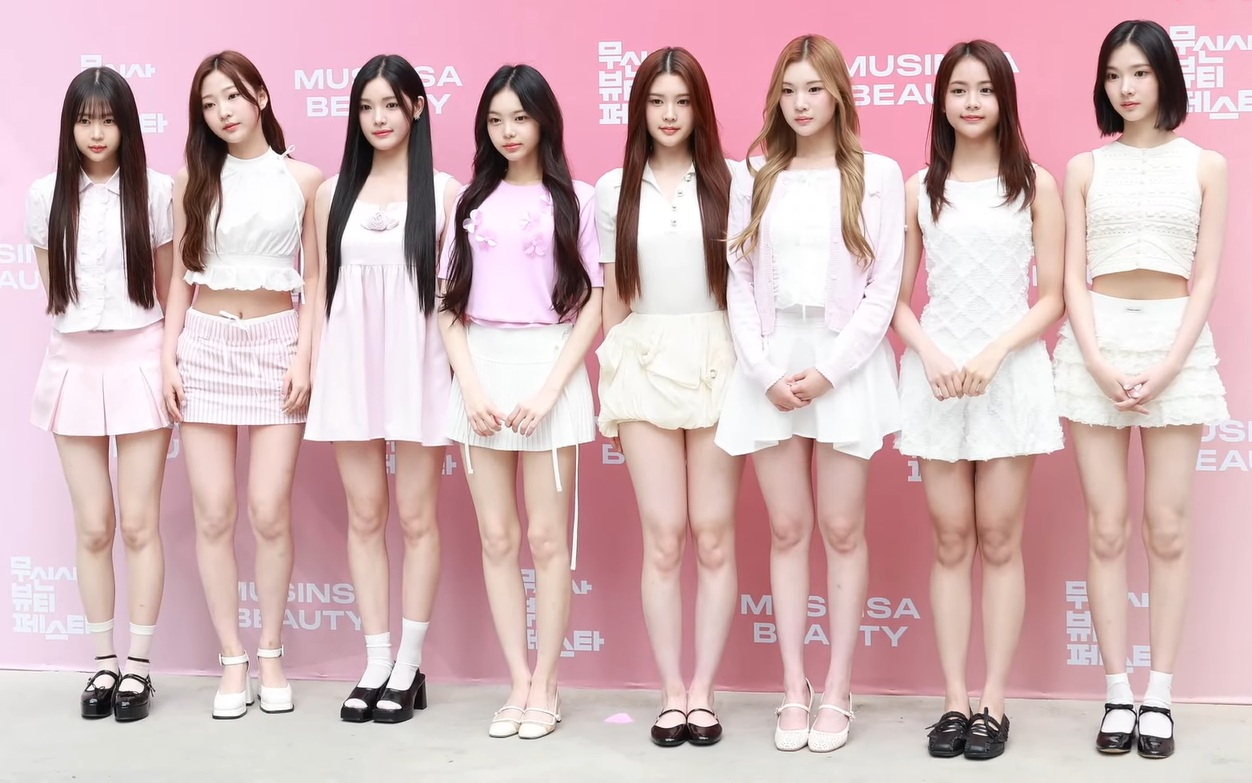
Hearts2Hearts, (2025)
