= Hands on Me (EP) =

2017 extended play by Chung Ha

- Digital cover

EP by Chung Ha
- Released: June 7, 2017
- Recorded: 2017
- Genre: Pop; tropical house; dance-pop; electro swing
- Length: 14:36
- Language: Korean
- Label: MNH; CJ E&M Music
- Producer: Lee Ju-seop (executive)

Chung Ha chronology
Hands on Me (2017)	Offset (2018)

Singles from Hands on Me
- 1. "Week" Released: April 21, 2017; 2. "Why Don't You Know" Released: June 7, 2017

Hands on Me is the debut extended play by South Korean singer Chung Ha. It was released on June 7, 2017 by MNH Entertainment and distributed by CJ E&M Music. It consists of five songs, including the title track "Why Don't You Know" featuring rapper Nucksal. A music video for the title track was also released on June 7.

The EP was a commercial success peaking at number 8 on the Gaon Album Chart.

== Background and release ==
After parting ways with her former group I.O.I in January 2017, MNH Entertainment announced their plans to have the singer debut as a solo artist within the year. On March 15, a representative from the company stated she would be debuting in April with an album.

On April 21, she released the single "Week" which would eventually be included in the album along with its music video but the album itself would not be released until a few months later. The company then revealed on May 16 that the singer will release her debut album in the next month.

The 5-track EP was released on June 7 with the lead single, "Why Don't You Know" which features rapper Nucksal. In an interview with The Korea Herald on June 8, Chung Ha shared her worries about going solo after promoting with I.O.I for less than a year as a result of winning a spot in the group when she competed in the Mnet survival program Produce 101 but also stated "going solo was the fastest way to show" her "true self". She also explained the meaning behind the album title and said the word "hand" gave her a warm feeling and was a reference to being chosen by fans to become a member of I.O.I.

== Promotion ==
Chung Ha performed songs from her new album at a showcase held on the same day as the album release. She made her debut stage on June 8 at M! Countdown. She also performed the song on various South Korean music programs like Show Champion, Music Bank, Show! Music Core and Inkigayo.

=== Singles ===
"Week" was released as a promotional single on April 21, 2017. The song entered at number 86 on the Gaon Digital Chart, on the chart issue dated June 16–22, 2017, with 28,492 downloads sold.

"Why Don't You Know" was released as the title track in conjunction with the EP on June 7. The debuted at no. 23 on the Gaon Digital Chart and rose to no. 16 a week later. It also debuted at no. 10 on the Gaon Download Chart and peaked at no. 8.

== Composition ==
The title track "Why Don't You Know" is described as a tropical house song about unrequited love. "Make A Wish" is a high-energy electro-swing jam and "우주먼지 (Cosmic Dust)" is a gentle piano ballad. The pre-release track "월화수목금토일 (Week)" is a ballad about the emptiness the singer felt after her former group's disbandment.

== Commercial performance ==
Hands on Me entered and peaked at number 8 on the Gaon Album Chart on the chart issue dated June 4–10, 2017. In its second week, the EP fell to number 22 and to number 28 in its third week. In its fourth week, the EP placed at number 30. The EP entered at number 15 on the chart for the month of June 2017, with 10,610 physical copies sold.

== Track listing ==
Digital download/CD

No.	Title	Lyrics	Music	Arrangement	Length
1.	"Hands on Me"	Chung Ha; VINCENZO; Fuxxy; Any Masingga	VINCENZO; Fuxxy; Any Masingga	VINCENZO; Fuxxy	1:08
2.	"Why Don't You Know" (feat. Nucksal)	Oreo (Note: Oreo is a production team composed of Iggy (Lim Soo-ho), C-no and Yong Kim.); Lee Jun-young	Oreo	Oreo	3:18
3.	"Make a Wish"	Dailydose; Anna Timgren	Dailydose; Anna Timgren	VINCENZO; Any Masingga	3:05
4.	"Cosmic Dust" (우주먼지; ujumeonji)	Black Band	Black Band; Red Ribbon	White Band	3:43
5.	"Week" (월화수목금토일; wolhwasumoggeumtoil)	CRACKER; Grizzly	CRACKER; Grizzly	CRACKER; Grizzly	3:22
Total length:					14:42

== Charts ==
Chart (2017)	Peak position
South Korea (Gaon Album Chart)	8

== Release history ==
Region	Date	Format	Label
South Korea	June 7, 2017	CD, digital download	MNH Entertainment, CJ E&M Music
Various	June 7, 2017	Digital download	MNH Entertainment
