= Week (Chung Ha song) =

2017 song by Chung Ha

Single by Chung Ha

from the EP Hands on Me
- Released: April 21, 2017
- Genre: K-pop
- Length: 3:22
- Label: MNH Entertainment; CJ E&M Music
- Songwriters: CRACKER; Grizzly

Chung Ha singles chronology
"Flower, Wind and You" (2016)	"Week" (2017)	"Why Don't You Know" (2017)

Music video
- "Week (MNH)" on YouTube "Week (Stone)" on YouTube

"Week" (Korean: 월화수목금토일; RR: Wolhwasumokgeumtoil) is a song by South Korean singer Chung Ha. The song was initially the pre-first single album of the singer, but was later repackaged into Chung Ha's first EP Hands on Me. It was also a pre-debut single.

== Composition ==
The pre-release track "월화수목금토일 (Week)" is a ballad about the emptiness the singer felt after her former group's disbandment.

== Music video ==
The music video was released on 20 April 2017 on YouTube.

== Charts ==
Chart (2017)	Peak position
South Korea (Gaon)	86

== Sales ==
=== Download ===
Region	Certification	Certified units/sales
South Korea	—	28,492
