= Why Don't You Know =

2017 debut single by Chung Ha

Single by Chung Ha

from the EP Hands on Me
- Released: June 6, 2017
- Recorded: 2017
- Genre: K-pop; dance; pop; tropical house
- Length: 3:18
- Label: MNH Entertainment; CJ E&M Music
- Songwriters: Oreo; Nucksal
- Producer: Oreo

Chung Ha singles chronology
"Week" (2017)	"Why Don't You Know" (2017)	"Gather at the Lobby" (2017)

Music video
- "Why Don't You Know (MNH)" on YouTube "Why Don't You Know (Stone)" on YouTube

"Why Don't You Know" is a song by South Korean singer Chung Ha, featuring rapper Nucksal. The song serves as the debut single from her debut EP, Hands on Me.

== Composition ==
"Why Don't You Know" is described as a tropical house song about unrequited love.

== Promotion ==
Chung Ha has been promoting the debut single on music shows. Chung Ha also collaborated with NCT's Taeyong with a new rap lyrics on Show! Music Core.

== Music video ==
The music video was released on 6 June 2017, and in the music video for the track, Chung Ha dances in a vast grassy field, sporting colorful summer outfits. As of January 2019, the music video has surpassed 20 million views on YouTube.

== Charts ==
=== Weekly charts ===
Chart (2017)	Peak position
South Korea (Gaon)	13
South Korea (Kpop Hot 100)	7

=== Year-end charts ===
Chart (2017)	Peak position
South Korea (Gaon)	74

== Sales ==
=== Download ===
Region	Certification	Certified units/sales
South Korea	—	911,145

== Accolades ==
Awards and nominations
Year	Organization	Category	Result	Ref.
2018	7th Gaon Chart Music Awards	New Artist of the Year (Song)	"Why Don't You Know" (ft. Nucksal)	Nominated
