= Nucksal =

South Korean rapper (born 1987)

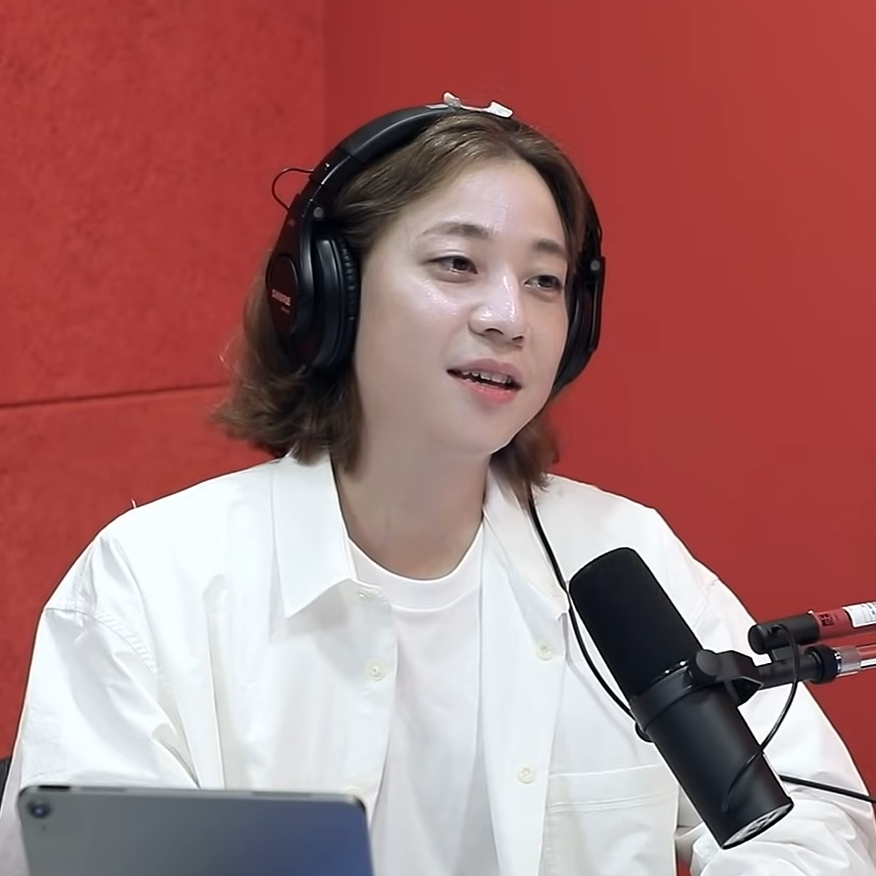
- Nucksal in 2021
- Born: Lee Jun-yeong; March 24, 1987 (age 38); Seoul, South Korea
- Occupation: Rapper
- Spouse: Yoo Seung-hyun (m. 2022)
- Children: 1
- Musical career
- Genres: K-pop; hip hop
- Instrument: Vocals
- Years active: 2013–present
- Labels: VMC

Korean name
- Hangul: 이준영
- RR: I Junyeong
- MR: I Chunyŏng

Lee Jun-yeong (Korean: 이준영; born March 24, 1987), better known by his stage name, Nucksal (넉살), is a South Korean rapper. He debuted in 2009 as a member of the hip hop duo Future Heaven, and became one of the most popular rappers in South Korea's underground hip hop scene. He gained mainstream recognition in 2017 after finishing in second place on the TV rap competition show, Show Me the Money 6.

== Personal life ==
On July 1, 2022, it was confirmed that Nucksal had been dating a non-celebrity woman for two years. They were married on September 24, 2022, in the presence of friends and family in Gangnam, Seoul.

In February 2023, his wife gave birth to their first child, a son, Lee Yun-woo, after five months of marriage.

== Discography ==
=== Studio albums ===
Title	Album details	Peak chart positions	Sales
Title	Album details	KOR	Sales
The God of Small Things	Released: February 4, 2016; Label: Vismajor Company, Stoneship, Genie Music; Formats: CD, digital download	26	KOR: 1,406+
1Q87	Released: September 30, 2020; Label: Vismajor Company, Stone Music Entertainment, Genie Music; Formats: CD, digital download	31	KOR: 2,589+

=== EPs ===
Title	Album details	Peak chart positions	Sales
Title	Album details	KOR	Sales
Sincerely Yours (with Cadejo)	Released: June 17, 2022; Label: Vismajor Company, Stone Music Entertainment, Genie Music; Formats: CD, digital download	27	

=== Singles ===
Title	Year	Peak chart positions	Sales	Album
Title	Year	KOR	Sales	Album
As lead artist
"Demon Dance Hall" (악마들이 춤 추는 댄스홀) feat. Samuel Seo	2014	—	—N/a	Non-album singles
"Black Ink" feat. Jayho, Cream	2014	—	—N/a	Non-album singles
"Skill Skill Skill" feat. DJ Wegun	2015	—	—N/a	The God of Small Things
"Nuckle Flow"	2017	—	—N/a	Non-album single
"We Go Higher" (위로) feat. ODEE	2017	—	—N/a	Fever Music Festival 2017
Collaborations
"Propolis" with Jura, Deepflow, Fana, No. 11	2016	—	—N/a	Honey Family BeeHive Project Vol. 2
"1/N" (N분의 1) with Hanhae, Ryno, Jo Woo-chan, feat. Dynamic Duo	2017	3	KOR: 750,050+	Show Me the Money 6
"Brrr Get$" (부르는게 값이야) with Jo Woo-chan, feat. Gaeko, Don Mills	2017	8	KOR: 174,664+	Show Me the Money 6
"Filament" feat. Kim Bum-soo	2017	6	KOR: 254,964+	Show Me the Money 6
"Even When the Curtains Fall" (막이 내려도) feat. Gaeko	2017	79	KOR: 47,597+	Show Me the Money 6
As featured artist
"SOFA" Deepflow feat. Nucksal, SUMIN	2017	—	—N/a	Non-album single
"Why Don't You Know" Chungha feat. Nucksal	2017	13	KOR: 911,145+	Hands on Me
"Karma" Babylon feat. Bewhy, Verbal Jint, The Quiett, TakeOne, Nucksal	2018	—	—N/a	Caelo
"I'MMA DO" (아마두) YUMDDA, Deepflow, Paloalto, The Quiett, Simon Dominic feat. Woo Won-jae, Keem Hyo-eun, Nucksal, Huckleberry P	2019	2	—N/a	Dingo X DAMOIM (Part 2)
"—" denotes releases that did not chart.

== Filmography ==
=== Television shows ===
Year	Title	Role	Notes	Ref.
2017	Show Me the Money 6	Contestant	2nd place winner	
2018	High School Rapper 2	Host	Season 2	
2018	Show Me the Money 777	Producer	with Deepflow	
2018	Everyday Swag	Cast member		
2019–present	Amazing Saturday	Cast member		
2019	SignHere	Host		
2021	On & Off	Cast member		
2021	Who Am I	Host		
2022	Artistak Game	User agent		
2022–2023	Skip	Host		

=== Web shows ===
Year	Title	Role	Notes	Ref.
2022	Complexer	Host	with Gabi	
2022	Boyfriend Love	Host		

=== Radio shows ===
Year	Title	Role	Notes	Ref.
2022	Bae Seong-jae's Ten	Special DJ	March 2022	
2022	Bae Seong-jae's Ten	Special DJ	December 5–11	

=== Music video appearances ===
Year	Song Title	Artist	Ref.
2022	"I Hate Trot" (나는 트로트가 싫어요)	Im Chang-jung	

== Awards and nominations ==
Name of the award ceremony, year presented, category, nominee of the award, and the result of the nomination
Award ceremony	Year	Category	Nominee / Work	Result	Ref.
Brand of the Year Awards	2021	Male Multi-Entertainer	Nucksal	Won	
Korean Hip-hop Awards	2017	Hip-hop Album of the Year	The God of Small Things	Won	
Korean Hip-hop Awards	2018	Collaboration of the Year	Nucksal with Hanhae, Ryno, Jo Woo-chan "1/N" (N분의 1)	Nominated	
