= List of Universe League contestants =

Universe League is a South Korean reality competition series broadcast by SBS that premiered on November 22, 2024. The program featured 42 participants competing for a spot in a new K-pop boy group. Eligibility was open to anyone aged 14 or older, with no limitations placed on nationality, professional background, or agency affiliation. Participants were selected through both direct applications and public recommendations submitted via official social media channels. The application period ran from April to June 2024, and the final contestant lineup was publicly announced in October.

The show's format consisted of six stages, each designed to evaluate the contestants' performance abilities, teamwork, and individual appeal. Evaluations combined input from team directors with audience voting, which was conducted through designated mobile applications and the broadcaster's website. According to the production team, the decision to cap the number of contestants at 42 was intended to allow more focused storytelling and increased visibility for each participant throughout the series. The competition concluded with the selection of a nine-member debut group named AHOF (All-time Hall Of Famer).

== Contestants ==
There are 42 players participating in the competition from various countries, primarily South Korea, Japan, China, Thailand, Australia, and the Philippines. The English names of contestants are presented in accordance with the official website.

Color Key:

Final member of the debut group AHOF
Contestant eliminated in the final episode
Contestant eliminated in third elimination round
Contestant eliminated in second elimination round
Contestant eliminated in first elimination round
Top 9 Contestants of the Ranking Announcement
Team Rhythm
Team Groove
Team Beat
Yellow Card

Company	Name	Age (Note: As of November 22, 2024, added new age if contestant is still in the show during their birthday)	Nationality	Pick	Represent		Intercept		Seven		Move		W.A.R		Final Rank
Company	Name	Age	Nationality	Episode 1-2	Episode 3		Episode 5		Episode 8		Episode 9		Episode 10		Final Rank
Company	Name	Age	Nationality	Team	Rank	Team	Rank	Team	Rank	Team	Rank	Team	Rank	Team	Final Rank
SBTown	JL (제이엘) (Note: JL is member of Pluus.)	20	Philippines	Rhythm	9	Rhythm	2	Rhythm	1	Rhythm	1	Rhythm	1	Rhythm	1
EVA Entertainment (EVA 엔터테인먼트)	Steven (스티븐) (Note: Kwon Heejun and Steven were contestants on Produce X 101.) (Note: Steven is a member of Luminous.)	24-25	Australia	Rhythm	14	Rhythm	4	Rhythm	3	Rhythm	2	Rhythm	4	Rhythm	2
Well Entertainment	Zhang Shuaibo (张帅博 / 장슈아이보) (Note: Cha Woongki and Zhang Shuaibo were contestants on Boys Planet.) (Note: Zhang Shuaibo was a contestant on Youth With You 3.)	22	China	Rhythm	8	Rhythm	3	Rhythm	5	Rhythm	3	Rhythm	5	Rhythm	3
Bill Entertainment (빌엔터테인먼트)	Park Juwon (박주원)	18	South Korea	Rhythm	1	Rhythm	9	Groove	7	Rhythm	6	Rhythm	6	Rhythm	4
Individual Trainee (개인연습생)	Seo Jeongwoo (서정우)	23	South Korea	Groove	2	Groove	8	Groove	8	Rhythm	14	Rhythm	7	Rhythm	5
Bill Entertainment (빌엔터테인먼트)	Chih En (简志恩 / 즈언)	18	Taiwan	Beat	11	Rhythm	5	Rhythm	6	Rhythm	4	Rhythm	10	Rhythm	6
CAT'S EYE Okinawa	Daisuke (大輔 / 다이스케)	14-15	Japan	Rhythm	22	Rhythm	11	Rhythm	11	Rhythm	8	Rhythm	14	Rhythm	7
Individual Trainee (개인연습생)	Park Han (박한)	21	South Korea	Groove	12	Groove	15	Groove	4	Groove	5	Groove	3	Groove	8
Individual Trainee (개인연습생)	Cha Woongki (차웅기) (Note: Cha Woongki and Jang Kyungho were contestants on World Klass and members of TO1.)	22	South Korea	Beat	4	Beat	1	Beat	2	Beat	7	Beat	2	Beat	9
Individual Trainee (개인연습생)	Jang Kyungho (장경호)	23	South Korea	Groove	18	Groove	7	Groove	12	Groove	16	Groove	8	Eliminated	10
FirstOne Entertainment (퍼스트원엔터테인먼트)	Kim Joohyoung (김주형) (Note: Kim Joo-hyoung is member of "NINE.i".)	21	South Korea	Groove	24	Groove	13	Groove	10	Groove	10	Groove	9	Eliminated	11
PI Corporation (피아이코퍼레이션)	Kwon Heejun (권희준)	23	South Korea	Rhythm	3	Groove	12	Groove	13	Groove	15	Groove	11	Eliminated	12
Individual Trainee (개인연습생)	Kenta (豊田賢太 / 켄타)	22	Japan	Groove	6	Groove	6	Groove	9	Groove	12	Groove	12	Eliminated	13
Individual Trainee (개인연습생)	Kairi (今井 魁里 / 카이리) (Note: Kairi is a former member of TFN.)	21	Japan	Beat	16	Beat	18	Beat	17	Beat	17	Beat	13	Eliminated	14
Individual Trainee (개인연습생)	Koo Hanseo (구한서) (Note: Koo Hanseo was a contestant on Under Nineteen.)	22	South Korea	Beat	21	Groove	20	Groove	15	Groove	13	Groove	15	Eliminated	15
PocketDol Studio (포켓돌스튜디오)	Kim Gijoong (김기중) (Note: Kim Gi-joong is a former member of the boy groups IM and UNB and was contestant on The Unit: Idol Rebooting Project and Wild Idol.)	23-24	South Korea	Groove	5	Groove	25	Groove	18	Groove	25	Groove	16	Eliminated	16
Individual Trainee (개인연습생)	Sirin (สิริน เรืองวรรณ / 시린)	16	Thailand	Rhythm	29	Rhythm	26	Groove	14	Groove	18	Beat	17	Eliminated	17
SME Japan (日本SME)	Yuito (榎本 唯人 / 유이토) (Note: Yuito was a contestant on Nizi Project 2.)	16-17	Japan	Beat	19	Beat	27	Beat	27	Beat	30	Beat	18	Eliminated	18
Eighty6	Keum Jinho (금진호) (Note: Bae Jaeho and Keum Jinho were contestants on Fantasy Boys.)	24	South Korea	Beat	26	Beat	17	Beat	23	Beat	22	Beat	19	Eliminated	19
STARON Entertainment (스타온 엔터테인먼트)	Kim Dongyun (김동윤)	16	South Korea	Beat	40	Beat	14	Rhythm	16	Groove	19	Beat	20	Eliminated	20
Bill Entertainment (빌엔터테인먼트)	Zen Zen (กิตติกวิน สายสังวร / 젠젠)	15-16	Thailand	Groove	36	Groove	33	Rhythm	25	Rhythm	11	Beat	21	Eliminated	21
Top Class Entertainment (TOP CLASS 娱乐)	Li Zhinuo (李知诺 / 리쯔누오) (Note: Jiang Fan, Jin Ziming, Li Zhinuo and Xie Yuxin are members of TOPTEENS.)	20	China	Rhythm	31	Rhythm	19	Rhythm	26	Rhythm	9	Eliminated			22
STARON Entertainment (스타온 엔터테인먼트)	Eito (金田栄人 / 에이토)	20	Japan	Rhythm	30	Rhythm	10	Rhythm	19	Rhythm	20	Eliminated			23
Top Class Entertainment (TOP CLASS 娱乐)	Xie Yuxin (解雨鑫 / 시웨이신)	19	China	Rhythm	27	Rhythm	38	Rhythm	35	Rhythm	21	Eliminated			24
Bill Entertainment (빌엔터테인먼트)	Ayumu (あゆむ/아유무)	20	Japan	Rhythm	25	Rhythm	22	Rhythm	28	Rhythm	23	Eliminated			25
Individual Trainee (개인연습생)	Mac (สิริ ไชยกุล / 맥)	17-18	Thailand	Rhythm	35	Rhythm	23	Rhythm	20	Rhythm	24	Eliminated			26
Individual Trainee (개인연습생)	Kim Daeyun (김대윤)	22	South Korea	Groove	23	Groove	29	Groove	24	Beat	26	Eliminated			27
Woollim Entertainment (울림엔터테인먼트)	Bae Jaeho (배재호)	16	South Korea	Groove	15	Groove	28	Groove	31	Groove	27	Eliminated			28
No.1 Entertainment	Anyul (안율) (Note: An Yul was a contestant on Voice King, Korea's Next K-pop Star and Burning Trotman.)	14-15	South Korea	Beat	13	Beat	32	Beat	29	Groove	28	Eliminated			29
Individual Trainee (개인연습생)	James (เจมส์ / 제임스)	20	Thailand	Groove	33	Groove	21	Rhythm	21	Rhythm	29	Eliminated			30
Blossom Entertainment (블러썸 엔터테인먼트)	Nam Doyoon (남도윤)	15-16	South Korea	Beat	20	Beat	31	Beat	33	Beat	31	Eliminated			31
I.E.One Entertainment (缔壹娱乐)	He Junjin (何俊锦 / 허쥔진)	19	China	Groove	17	Groove	16	Groove	22	Groove	32	Eliminated			32
Individual Trainee (개인연습생)	Yeo Gangdong (여강동)	17	South Korea	Groove	10	Groove	34	Groove	32	Groove	33	Eliminated			33
CAT'S EYE Okinawa	Hiroto (ヒロト/히로토)	21	Japan	Groove	7	Rhythm	24	Rhythm	30	Groove	34	Eliminated			34
Individual Trainee (개인연습생)	Kim Hyotae (김효태)	20	South Korea	Beat	34	Beat	30	Beat	34	Eliminated					35
I.E.One Entertainment (缔壹娱乐)	Li Zhiwei (李致伟 / 리쯔웨이)	22	China	Groove	38	Beat	37	Beat	36	Eliminated					36
Top Class Entertainment (TOP CLASS 娱乐)	Jin Ziming (晋子铭 / 진즈밍)	17	China	Rhythm	28	Rhythm	40	Beat	37	Eliminated					37
TOV Entertainment (TOV 엔터테인먼트)	Royce (张子胤 / 로이스) (Note: Royce is a member of YOUTOVE)	23	China	Rhythm	37	Beat	35	Eliminated							38
Top Class Entertainment (TOP CLASS 娱乐)	Jiang Fan (姜帆 / 지앙판)	19	China	Beat	39	Beat	36	Eliminated							39
Individual Trainees (개인연습생)	Park Jihun (박지훈)	18	South Korea	Beat	42	Beat	39	Eliminated							40
Individual Trainees (개인연습생)	Kang Junhyuk (강준혁)	17	South Korea	Beat	41	Beat	41	Eliminated							41
Individual Trainees (개인연습생)	Park Yeonjun (박연준)	17	South Korea	Beat	32	Beat	42	Eliminated							42
