= AHOF =

South Korean boy band

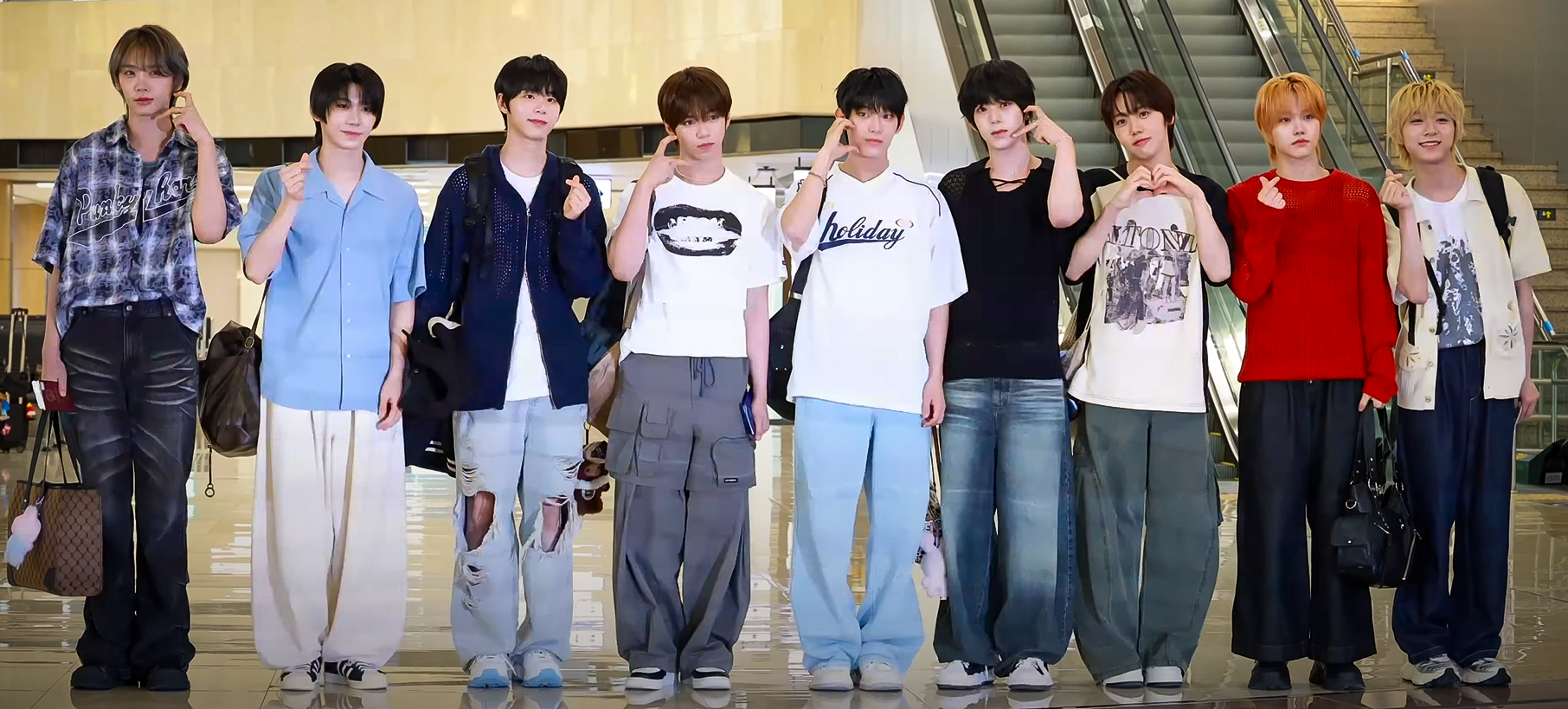
- AHOF in August 2025; Left to right: Shuaibo, Han, Jeongwoo, JL, Steven, Chih En, Woongki, Juwon, Daisuke

Background information
- Also known as: All-time Hall Of Famer
- Origin: Seoul, South Korea
- Genre: K-pop
- Years active: 2025–present
- Labels: F&F
- Members: Steven; Jeongwoo; Woongki; Shuaibo; Han; JL; Juwon; Chih En; Daisuke
- Website: AHOF

AHOF (Korean: 아홉; RR: Ahop; lit. 'Nine'; backronym for All-time Hall Of Famer) is a South Korean boy band formed through SBS TV's reality competition show Universe League. Managed by F&F Entertainment, the group consists of nine members: Steven, Jeongwoo, Woongki, Shuaibo, Han, JL, Juwon, Chih En, and Daisuke. They debuted on July 1, 2025, with the extended play (EP) Who We Are.

== Name ==
The group's name, 'AHOF' short for All-time Hall Of Famer was conceived by F&F Entertainment to reflect the agency's intent of establishing the group as lasting and influential figures in the K-pop industry, evoking the idea of a "hall of fame". In Korean, the pronunciation of AHOF is similar to the word for the number 9, referencing the group's nine members and implying an ongoing journey rather than a finished state, in line with their emphasis on continued growth.

== History ==
=== Formation through Universe League and other activities ===
AHOF is a nine-member K-pop group formed through SBS's reality competition show Universe League, which aired from November 22, 2024, to January 24, 2025. The show featured 42 contestants from South Korea, China, Taiwan, Japan, Thailand, Australia, and the Philippines, who competed for a spot in a multinational boy group. On January 24, the final lineup was announced: seven members from the winning team, Team Rhythm, and one top-voted contestant from each of the two losing teams, based on global voting.

Before appearing on the program, several AHOF members had prior experience in the entertainment industry. In 2019, Steven participated in Mnet's Produce X 101 under his full name as a DS Entertainment trainee and was eliminated in 72nd place. He later debuted in 2021 as a member of Luminous, which officially disbanded on February 9, 2025. That same year, Cha Woong-ki competed in To Be World Klass, where he ranked third and debuted in April 2020 as a member of TOO, which rebranded as TO1 in March 2021. He departed from TO1 in June 2022. Zhang Shuaibo participated in iQIYI's Youth With You 3 in 2021 and was eliminated in the first round, ranking between 63rd and 118th place. In 2023, Cha Woong-ki and Zhang Shuaibo took part in Mnet's Boys Planet, where they were eliminated in episode 11, ranking 20th and 28th, respectively. In March 2023, JL made his debut as a member of the Philippine boy group Pluus.

=== 2025: Debut with Who We Are, The Passage, and "AHOFOHA: All Time Heartfelt Only FOHA" ===
Following the group's formation on January 24, F&F Entertainment announced that AHOF members would take a short break before beginning preparations for their official debut, initially scheduled for the first half of 2025. The agency later confirmed that the group would debut on July 1 with their first EP, Who We Are, which features six tracks produced by Universe League mentor El Capitxn. The title track, "Rendezvous", is a pop rock song with guitar and drum instrumentation and a dreamlike arrangement. Lyrically, it conveys themes of anxiety, nostalgia, and emotional longing tied to the pursuit of a dream, with member Cha Woong-ki credited as one of the lyricists. AHOF held a showcase at the YES24 Live Hall in Gwangjin District, Seoul to commemorate their debut and the EP's release.

Who We Are sold 369,850 copies in its first week, marking the highest first-week sales for a debut boy group in 2025. It also ranked fifth overall among all boy group debut-week sales in South Korea. Meanwhile, "Rendezvous" earned AHOF their first music show trophy on July 8 through SBS funE's The Show, followed by additional wins on MBC M's Show Champion on July 9 and KBS2's Music Bank on July 12, completing a "triple crown" within 10 days of their debut, marking a significant early milestone in the group's career. These achievements led media outlets to describe them as "monster rookies". Their debut also prompted renewed discourse on the viability of idol audition programs, suggesting that such formats may remain effective when supported by strong fan engagement.

Ahead of their debut album release, AHOF made their first public stage appearance as a full group at the 2025 MyK Festa on June 19. They performed newly arranged versions of three songs from Universe League: "Ignition", "Butterfly", and "Mamma Mia". The setlist was selected through a global fan poll asking which songs audiences most wanted to hear from AHOF. On June 25, the group was also announced as part of the lineup for the 2025 SBS Gayo Daejeon Summer Festival, scheduled for July 26. Their participation was confirmed before their official debut, an inclusion considered unusual given that the event typically invites K-pop artists who already debuted.

After their debut, AHOF conducted a series of release events across Osaka and Tokyo in early August, marking their first overseas promotional tour and signaling early expansion into the Japanese market. They next appeared on their first festival appearance through MBC's Show! Music Core 2025 Ulsan Summer Festival Special, where they performed the title track "Rendezvous" from their debut EP, introducing them to a broader domestic audience. Later that month, the group held their first fan concert, Rendezvous in Manila, at the Araneta Coliseum in Quezon City, Philippines, on August 30. It was reported that tickets sold out within 30 minutes, and the show, attended by about 10,000 fans, was covered by South Korean and Philippine media as AHOF's first large-scale overseas appearance, reflecting the group's strong support in the Philippines and increasing international attention.

On September 16, F&F Entertainment announced that AHOF member Chih En would be taking a temporary hiatus from group activities due to health concerns. The agency stated that the decision was made with the artist's health and well-being as the foremost priority, with AHOF continuing its activities and promotions as an eight-member group.

On October 14, it was announced that the group's second EP The Passage would be released on November 4, signifying their first comeback since debut. The EP features 5 tracks produced by El Capitxn and VENDORS, with members Steven, Woongki, and Han credited as lyricists. The title track, "Pinocchio" is a pop rock type song with a similar essence to their debut title track "Rendezvous". Lyrically "Pinocchio" conveys themes of coming of age, growing pains, anxiety, confusion, instability, and resilience, using Pinocchio as a projection of their own transition to adulthood.

The Passage sold 380,904 copies within its first week, surpassing the group's record for first week sales, and earning the group its first platinum certification for the WITHVUU version of the album. Meanwhile, "Pinnochio" earned its first music show trophy through SBS funE's The Show on November 11, followed by additional wins on MBC M's Show Champion on November 12, and KBS2's Music Bank on November 14.

On December 1, F&F Entertainment announced that Chih En, who had previously suspended activities due to health issues, had recovered after a period of medical treatment and rest. The agency stated that his health had sufficiently improved for him to resume daily life and group activities. It further confirmed that, following medical advice and the artist's own decision, Chih En would return to activities beginning with the 2026 AHOF 1st Fan-Con in Seoul, "AHOFOHA: All Time Heartfelt Only FOHA", which took place from January 3 to January 4, 2026.

=== 2026-present: "The First Spark", and Run To You ===
On April 22, 2026, F&F Entertainment announced the group's first international tour "The First Spark" with stops in Seoul, Osaka, Tokyo, Kuala Lumpur, Manila, and Taipei. Originally slated for 10 shows, the stops in Bangkok and Hong Kong were postponed via an announcement by tour producer Applewood Korea through their social media channels, following a comprehensive review of 'the local production schedule and operational circumstances', as well as the group's upcoming activities. The tour ran from May 2026 to August 2026.

On June 22, F&F Entertainment announced that the group's third EP Run To You would be released on July 8, following the release of pre-release single "Sugar High" on June 12. "Run To You" earned its first music show trophy on MBC M's Show Champion on July 15.

== Artistry ==
AHOF has described their artistic direction as focused on continuous growth and experimentation, identifying different K-pop artists as key influence for their versatility in musical styles and concepts. The group has expressed a long-term goal of achieving recognition within K-pop's legacy, aspiring to be among the acts associated with a conceptual "hall of fame".

== Members ==
- Steven (스티븐) – leader
- Jeongwoo (서정우)
- Woongki (차웅기)
- Shuaibo (장슈아이보)
- Han (박한)
- JL (제이엘)
- Juwon (박주원)
- Chih En (즈언)
- Daisuke (다이스케)

== Discography ==
=== Extended plays ===
List of extended plays, showing selected details, selected chart positions, sales figures, and certifications
Title	Details	Peak chart positions		Sales	Certifications
Title	Details	KOR	JPN	Sales	Certifications
Who We Are	Released: July 1, 2025; Label: F&F Entertainment; Formats: CD, digital download, streaming; Track listing: 1. "The Little Star"; 2. "The Universe"; 3. "Rendezvous"; 4. "Incompleted"; 5. "Cosmic Underdog"; 6. "AHOF"	3	—	KOR: 369,850	
The Passage	Released: November 4, 2025; Label: F&F Entertainment; Formats: CD, digital download, streaming; Track listing: 1. "Everything is Love"; 2. "Run at 1.5x Speed"; 3. "Pinocchio"; 4. "Never Lose You"; 5. "The Sleeping Diary"	2	—	KOR: 472,324	KMCA: Platinum (Withvuu)
Run to You	Released: July 8, 2026; Label: F&F Entertainment; Formats: CD, digital download, streaming; Track listing: 1. "Run to You"; 2. "Sugar High"; 3. "Just Say Yes"; 4. "You're the Reason"; 5. "Our Story"	4	6	KOR: 126,173; JPN: 11,491	

=== Special albums ===
List of special albums, showing selected details
Title	Details
Day 1	Released: July 1, 2026; Type: Anniversary album; Label: F&F Entertainment; Formats: Digital download, streaming; Track listing: 1. "Mamma Mia (Who We Are) (AHOF Ver.)"; 2. "Butterfly (AHOF Ver.)"; 3. "Ignition (AHOF Ver.)"

=== Singles ===
List of singles, showing year released, selected chart positions, and name of the album
Title	Year	Peak chart positions		Album
Title	Year	KOR	KOR DL	Album
"Rendezvous" (그곳에서 다시 만나기로 해)	2025	114	2	Who We Are
"Pinocchio" (피노키오는 거짓말을 싫어해)	2025	103	4	The Passage
"Sugar High"	2026	—	—	Run to You
"Mamma Mia (Who We Are)" (AHOF Ver.)	2026	—	—	Day 1
"Butterfly" (AHOF Ver.)	2026	—	—	Day 1
"Ignition" (AHOF Ver.)	2026	—	—	Day 1
"Run to You"	2026	156	4	Run to You

=== Other charted songs ===
List of other charted songs, showing year released, selected chart positions, and name of the album
Title	Year	Peak chart positions	Album
Title	Year	KOR DL	Album
"The Little Star" (소년, 무대 위로 넘어지다)	2025	82	Who We Are
"The Universe" (파랑 학교, 초록 잔디, 빨간 운동화)	2025	80	Who We Are
"Incompleted" (미완성은 아닐거야)	2025	78	Who We Are
"Cosmic Underdog" (우주 최고의 꼴찌)	2025	79	Who We Are
"AHOF" (아홉, 우리가 빛나는 숫자)	2025	94	Who We Are
"Everything Is Love" (아홉, 빛나는 숫자의 시작)	2025	150	The Passage
"Run At 1.5x Speed" (1.5x의 속도로 달려줘)	2025	153	The Passage
"Never Lose You" (다신 너를 잃지 않게)	2025	150	The Passage
"The Sleeping Diary" (잠든 일기장)	2025	158	The Passage
"Just Say Yes"	2026	105	Run To You
"You're The Reason" (그냥 너라서 그래)	2026	110	Run To You
"Our Story"	2026	112	Run To You

== Videography ==
=== Music videos ===
List of music videos, showing year released, and name of the director(s)
Title	Year	Director(s)	Ref.
"Rendezvous"	2025	Jan Lee (Ambience)	
"The Universe"	2025	Guzza (Ambience)	
"Pinocchio"	2025	Jan Lee (Aedia Studio)	
"Run To You"	2026	Lee Ki-suk, Kim Do-yun (LayerZ)	

=== Other videos ===
Title	Year	Director(s)	Notes	Ref.
"The Little Star"	2025	—	Intro film	
"Rendezvous"	2025	Team SIKONIC	Performance video	
"Never Lose You"	2026	—	Live clip	
"Sugar High"	2026	LayerZ	Performance video	
"Focus on You"	2026	—	Special clip	

== Live performances ==
=== Concerts and tours ===
Date	City	Country	Venue	Performed song(s)	Ref.
AHOF 1st Philippine Fancon: Rendezvous in Manila
August 30, 2025	Manila	Philippines	Smart Araneta Coliseum	"Rendezvous"; "Butterfly"; "Mamma Mia" (Universe League covers); "The Little Prince" (Ryeo-wook cover) (Note: Han & JL); "Cosmic Underdog"; "Universe"; Go Up (SB19 cover); "Ignition"; "We Ready" (Universe League covers); "The Little Star"; "Incompleted"	
2026 AHOF 1st Fan-con <AHOFOHA: All Time Heartfelt Only FOHA>
January 3, 2026	Seoul	South Korea	Jangchung Arena	"Everything Is Love"; "Rendezvous"; "Cosmic Underdog"; "The Sleeping Diary"; "Run At 1.5x Speed"; "The Universe"; "popppop" (NCT Wish cover) (Note: Jeongwoo, Woongki, Shuaibo, JL, Chih En); Mic Drop (BTS cover) (Note: Steven, Han, Juwon, Daisuke); "We Ready"; "Ignition/Mamma Mia" (Note: Ignition was performed on Day 1, while Mamma Mia was performed on Day 2.); "Butterfly" (Universe League covers); "Pinocchio"; "Never Lose You"; "Incompleted"; "The Little Star"	
January 4, 2026	Seoul	South Korea	Jangchung Arena	"Everything Is Love"; "Rendezvous"; "Cosmic Underdog"; "The Sleeping Diary"; "Run At 1.5x Speed"; "The Universe"; "popppop" (NCT Wish cover); Mic Drop (BTS cover); "We Ready"; "Ignition/Mamma Mia"; "Butterfly" (Universe League covers); "Pinocchio"; "Never Lose You"; "Incompleted"; "The Little Star"	
2026 AHOF 1st Tour: The First Spark (Note: The August 8 and 15 stops in Bangkok, Thailand, and Hong Kong were indefinitely postponed due to local production schedules.)
May 30, 2026	Seoul	South Korea	BlueSquare Woori WON Banking Hall	"Ignition"; "We Ready" (Universe League covers); "Cosmic Underdog"; "Run At 1.5x Speed"; "The Universe"; "Incompleted"; "Never Lose You"; "The Little Star"; "Bang Bang" (Ive cover) (Note: Woongki, Shuaibo, JL, Chih En); "I Need U" (BTS cover) (Note: Steven, Jeongwoo, Han, Juwon, Daisuke); "Love Me Right" (Exo cover); "Pinocchio"; "Mamma Mia" (Universe League cover); "Sugar High"; "The Sleeping Diary"; "Butterfly" (Universe League cover); "Everything Is Love"; "Rendezvous"; "Our Story"	
May 31, 2026	Seoul	South Korea	BlueSquare Woori WON Banking Hall	"Ignition"; "We Ready" (Universe League covers); "Cosmic Underdog"; "Run At 1.5x Speed"; "The Universe"; "Incompleted"; "Never Lose You"; "The Little Star"; "Bang Bang" (Ive cover); "I Need U" (BTS cover); "Love Me Right" (Exo cover); "Pinocchio"; "Mamma Mia" (Universe League cover); "Sugar High"; "The Sleeping Diary"; "Butterfly" (Universe League cover); "Everything Is Love"; "Rendezvous"; "Our Story"	
June 24, 2026	Osaka	Japan	Zepp Namba	"Ignition"; "We Ready" (Universe League covers); "Cosmic Underdog"; "Run At 1.5x Speed"; "The Universe"; "Incompleted"; "Never Lose You"; "The Little Star"; "Bang Bang" (Ive cover); "I Need U" (BTS cover); "Love Me Right" (Exo cover); "Pinocchio"; "Mamma Mia" (Universe League cover); "Sugar High"; "The Sleeping Diary"; "Butterfly" (Universe League cover); "Everything Is Love"; "Rendezvous"; "Our Story"	
June 27, 2026	Tokyo	Japan	Zepp Haneda	"Ignition"; "We Ready" (Universe League covers); "Cosmic Underdog"; "Run At 1.5x Speed"; "The Universe"; "Incompleted"; "Never Lose You"; "The Little Star"; "Bang Bang" (Ive cover); "I Need U" (BTS cover); "Love Me Right" (Exo cover); "Pinocchio"; "Mamma Mia" (Universe League cover); "Sugar High"; "The Sleeping Diary"; "Butterfly" (Universe League cover); "Everything Is Love"; "Rendezvous"; "Our Story"	
July 4, 2026	Kuala Lumpur	Malaysia	Jiospace	"Ignition"; "We Ready" (Universe League covers); "Cosmic Underdog"; "Run At 1.5x Speed"; "The Universe"; "Incompleted"; "Never Lose You"; "The Little Star"; "Bang Bang" (Ive cover); "I Need U" (BTS cover); "Love Me Right" (Exo cover); "Pinocchio"; "Mamma Mia" (Universe League cover); "Sugar High"; "The Sleeping Diary"; "Butterfly" (Universe League cover); "Everything Is Love"; "Rendezvous"; "Our Story"	
July 25, 2026	Manila	Philippines	SM Mall of Asia Arena	"Ignition"; "We Ready" (Universe League covers); "Cosmic Underdog"; "Run At 1.5x Speed"; "The Universe"; "Incompleted"; "Never Lose You"; "The Little Star"; "Bang Bang" (Ive cover); "I Need U" (BTS cover); "Love Me Right" (Exo cover); "Pinocchio"; "Mamma Mia" (Universe League cover); "Sugar High"; "The Sleeping Diary"; "Butterfly" (Universe League cover); "Everything Is Love"; "Run To You"; "Rendezvous"; "Just Say Yes"; "Our Story"	
July 26, 2026	Manila	Philippines	SM Mall of Asia Arena	"Ignition"; "We Ready" (Universe League covers); "Cosmic Underdog"; "Run At 1.5x Speed"; "The Universe"; "Incompleted"; "Never Lose You"; "The Little Star"; "Bang Bang" (Ive cover); "I Need U" (BTS cover); "Love Me Right" (Exo cover); "Pinocchio"; "Mamma Mia" (Universe League cover); "Sugar High"; "The Sleeping Diary"; "Butterfly" (Universe League cover); "Everything Is Love"; "Run To You"; "Rendezvous"; "Just Say Yes"; "Our Story"	
August 2, 2026	Taipei	Taiwan	Taipei International Convention Center	"Ignition"; "We Ready" (Universe League covers); "Cosmic Underdog"; "Run At 1.5x Speed"; "The Universe"; "Incompleted"; "Never Lose You"; "The Little Star"; "Bang Bang" (Ive cover); "I Need U" (BTS cover); "Love Me Right" (Exo cover); "Pinocchio"; "Mamma Mia" (Universe League cover); "Sugar High"; "The Sleeping Diary"; "Butterfly" (Universe League cover); "Everything Is Love"; "Run To You"; "Rendezvous"; "Just Say Yes"; "Our Story"	

=== Music festivals ===
Event	Date	Location (Note: Venue, City, Country)	Performed song(s)	Ref.
MyK Festa 2025	June 19, 2025	KSPO Dome, Seoul, South Korea	"Ignition"; "Butterfly"; "Mamma Mia" (Universe League covers)	
2025 SBS Gayo Daejeon Summer	July 26, 2025	KINTEX, Goyang, South Korea	"Rendezvous"	
ACON 2025	December 7, 2025	Kaohsiung National Stadium, Kaohsiung, Taiwan	"The Little Star"; "Rendezvous"; "The Universe"; "Pinocchio"	
2025 KBS Song Festival	December 19, 2025	Songdo Convensia, Incheon, South Korea	"Fire" (BTS cover, (Note: Steven, Park Han, JL, and Park Ju-won) with Close Your Eyes (Note: Jeon Min-wook, Ma Jingxiang, Song Seung-ho, Seo Kyoung-bae)); "Pinocchio"	
2025 SBS Gayo Daejeon Winter	December 25, 2025	Inspire Arena, Incheon, South Korea	"Pinocchio" (Gayo Daejeon ver.)	
GMA Kapuso New Year Countdown 2026	December 31, 2025	SM Mall of Asia, Pasay, Philippines	"Pinocchio"; "The Universe"; "Rendezvous"; "Butterfly" (Universe League cover); "Run at 1.5x Speed"; "Mamma Mia"; "We Ready"; "Ignition" (Universe League covers)	
K-Style Party 2026	May 10, 2026	K-Arena Yokohama, Yokohama, Japan	"Pinocchio"; "Run at 1.5x Speed"; "The Universe"; "Rendezvous"; "Ignition"; "Mamma Mia"; (Universe League covers)	
Weverse Con Festival 2026	June 6, 2026	KSPO Dome, 88 Lawn Field, Seoul, South Korea	"We Ready" (Universe League cover); "The Universe"; "Run at 1.5x Speed"; "Rendezvous"; "Pinocchio"; "Mamma Mia" (Universe League cover)	
NOL Festival 2026	October 18, 2026	KINTEX, Goyang, South Korea	"Run To You"; "Sunset Glow" (BigBang cover); "Just Say Yes"	

=== Awards shows ===
Event	Date	Venue	Performed song(s)	Ref.
2025 K-World Dream Awards	August 21, 2025	Jamsil Arena, Seoul, South Korea	"Rendezvous"	
The Fact Music Awards 2025	September 20, 2025	Macao Outdoor Performance Venue, Macau, China	"Dynamite" (BTS cover); "Rendezvous"; "Outro Performance" (with Close Your Eyes)	
2025 Korea Grand Music Awards	November 15, 2025	Inspire Arena, Incheon, South Korea	"We Ready" (Universe League cover, AHOF ver.); "Pinocchio"; "Bang Bang Bang" (BigBang cover)	
10th Asia Artist Awards	December 6, 2025	Kaohsiung National Stadium, Kaohsiung, Taiwan	"Rendezvous"	
2nd D Awards	February 11, 2026	Korea University, Seoul, South Korea	"The Little Star"; "Pinocchio"; "The Sleeping Diary"	
35th Seoul Music Awards	June 20, 2026	Inspire Arena, Incheon, South Korea	"Intro"; "Pinocchio"; "Sugar High"	
2026 K-World Dream Awards	August 27, 2026	KINTEX, Goyang, South Korea	"Run To You"	
2026 Korea Grand Music Awards	November 8, 2026	Gocheok Sky Dome, Seoul, South Korea	"Run" (BTS cover); "Run To You"	
2026 Golden Disc Awards		Vietnam Exposition Center, Hanoi, Vietnam		

== Filmography ==
=== Reality shows ===
Reality shows appearances
Year	Title	Notes	Ref.
2024–25	Universe League	Reality competition show determining AHOF's members	

== Awards and nominations ==
Name of the award ceremony, year presented, category, nominee of the award, and the result of the nomination
Award ceremony	Year	Category	Nominee / Work	Result	Ref.
Asia Artist Awards	2025	Best New Artist	AHOF	Won	
Asia Artist Awards	2025	Popularity Award – Group	AHOF	Nominated	
Asia Star Entertainer Awards	2026	Fan Choice - 5th Generation Artist	AHOF	Won	
Cable TV Broadcasting Awards	2026	K-Culture Star Award	AHOF	Won	
D Awards	2026	Best Rising Star (Boy)	AHOF	Won	
D Awards	2026	Discovery of the Year	AHOF	Won	
D Awards	2026	Delights Blue Label (Bonsang)	AHOF	Won	
D Awards	2026	Dreams Silver Label	AHOF	Won	
The Fact Music Awards	2025	Hottest Award	AHOF	Won	
Global Fan's Choice Awards	2025	Global Rookie of the Year	AHOF	Won	
Golden Disc Awards	2025	Rookie Artist of the Year	AHOF	Nominated	
Golden Disc Awards	2026	Golden Choice	AHOF	Won	
K-World Dream Awards	2025	Super Rookie Award	AHOF	Won	
K-World Dream Awards	2026	Global Spotlight Award	AHOF	Won	
K-World Dream Awards	2026	Best Fandom	FOHA	Won	
Korea Grand Music Awards	2025	Best Artist 10	AHOF	Nominated	
Korea Grand Music Awards	2025	Best Dance Performance	"Rendezvous"	Won	
Korea Grand Music Awards	2025	Best Popularity – Music Day	AHOF	Nominated	
Korea Grand Music Awards	2025	BIGC Global Star Award	AHOF	Nominated	
Korea Grand Music Awards	2025	IS Rookie	AHOF	Won	
Korea Social Contribution Awards	2025	Global K-Icon (K-POP Artist)	AHOF	Nominated	
MAMA Awards	2025	Artist of the Year	AHOF	Nominated	
MAMA Awards	2025	Best New Artist	AHOF	Nominated	
MAMA Awards	2025	Fans' Choice Male	AHOF	Nominated	
Newsis K-Expo Cultural Awards	2025	Global Netizen Award	AHOF	Won	
Seoul Music Awards	2026	Rookie of the Year	AHOF	Won	
Seoul Music Awards	2026	Popularity Award	AHOF	Nominated	
Seoul Music Awards	2026	K-pop World Choice - Group	AHOF	Nominated	
