= 2nd D Awards =

2026 South Korean music award ceremony

- Official poster
- Date: February 11, 2026
- Location: Korea University Hwajeong Gymnasium, Seoul
- Country: South Korea
- Hosted by: Lee Jong-won; Shin Ye-eun; Myung Jae-hyun

Highlights
- Most wins: Enhypen (5)

Television/radio coverage
- Network: Channel A

The 2nd installment of the D Awards was an award ceremony held on February 11, 2026, at the Korea University Hwajeong Gymnasium. Lee Jong-won, Shin Ye-eun, and Myung Jae-hyun served as hosts. It was organized by Sports Dong-a, a sister brand of the Dong-a Ilbo.

== Background and overview ==
In December 2025, The 2nd D Awards was announced to be held at Korea University Hwajeong Gymnasium in South Korea in 2026 by Sports Dong-a. The judging criteria for D Awards are a comprehensive combination of online voting through Upick application, music and album sales, and judging by the judging panel. D Awards offers three varieties of trophies featuring hexahedron design, each in a distinct color derived from the awards' symbolic color: 'black' for the grand prizes, 'blue' for the main prizes and best sub-award categories, and 'silver' for the emerging K-Pop artists.

On January 20, 2025, Lee Jong-won, Shin Ye-eun, and Myung Jae-hyun was announced to be the host of the event. The award ceremony was broadcast via Channel A on February 22, 2025, at 18:00 KST.

== Performers ==
The first performer lineup was announced on December 4. The second lineup was announced on December 18. The third lineup was announced on December 31.

Performances for Day 1
Artist(s)	Song(s) performed
Fifty Fifty	"Perfect Crime" "Pookie"
Qwer	"Blue Whale" "Dear"
KickFlip	"Special Point" "My First Love Song"
Hi-Fi Unicorn	"Teenage Blue "Beat It Beat It"
Nexz	"Beat-Boxer" "Next To Me"
Izna	"Mamma Mia" "Sign"
AHOF	"The Little Star" (intro) "Pinocchio" "The Sleeping Diary" (outro)
Chuei Liyu x AxMxP	"See You Later"
AxMxP	"Pass"
Chuei Liyu	"UxYOUxU"
82Major	"D Freestyle" "Trophy"
Xikers	"Superpower (Peak)"
P1Harmony	"Look At Me Now" "Pretty Boy" "Duh!"
NCT Wish	"Color" "Poppop" "Melt Inside My Pocket"
BoyNextDoor	"Dangerous" "Hollywood Action" "I Feel Good"
Enhypen	"Big Girl Don't Cry" "No Way Back" "Knife"

== Presenters ==
The presenter lineup was announced on January 27.

- Kangnam
- Kim Da-som
- Kim On-a
- Kim Hae-joon
- Na Bo-ram
- Moon You-kang
- Mimiminu
- Park Seo-ham
- Park Ji-yeon
- Song Ah
- Ahn Eun-jin
- Ahn Hyo-seop
- Oh Yeon-seo
- Yoo Jae-pil
- Lee Su-ji
- Lee Joo-ahn
- Im Soo-hyang
- Jeon Yeo-been
- Choi Jin-hyuk
- Hong Jong-hyun

== Winners and nominees ==
Winners are listed in alphabetical order and emphasized in bold. Some award categories were announced through a pre-award system where the acceptance speech of the winner uploaded on the award's official social media account.

=== Black Label ===
Artist of the Year	Song of the Year
**Enhypen**	**BoyNextDoor - "If I Say, I Love You"**
Album of the Year	Record of the Year
**Stray Kids - Karma**	**Riize - Odyssey**
Performance of the Year	Trend of the Year
**NCT Wish**	**TWS**
D Awards Global	D Awards Iconic
**P1Harmony**	**Zerobaseone**

=== Blue Label ===
Delights Blue Label
**82Major**; **AHOF**; **BoyNextDoor**; **Enhypen**; **Fifty Fifty**; **Izna**; **KickFlip**; **NCT Wish**; **Nexz**; **P1Harmony**; **Qwer**; **Xikers**; **Zerobaseone**
Best Band	Best Breakthrough
**QWER**	**82Major**
Best Choreography	Best Group
**Fifty Fifty**	**BoyNextDoor**; **Enhypen**; **Izna**; **Nmixx**
Best OST	Best Recording
**Matthew & Gunwook of Zerobaseone**	**BoyNextDoor**; **P1Harmony**
Best Stage	Best Social Contents
**Nexz**; **Xikers**	**NCT Wish**
Best Song	Best Tour
**NCT Wish**; **Izna**	**Enhypen**
Best Video	D Awards Impact
**Zerobaseone**	**Jeon Yeo-been**; **Ahn Hyo-seop**; **Lee Su-ji**

==== Popularity Awards ====
The popularity awards were determined through online voting on Upick. Voting for the six popularity categories took place from December 26, 2025 to January 6, 2026 and was conducted in multiple rounds.

Best Popularity Award
Boy Solo	Girl Solo
**Chuei Liyu**; list of nominees: Baekhyun; Kim Yong-bin; XngHan; G-Dragon; Jin; Lee Mujin; Doyoung; Yeonjun; Jang Ha-neum; and many more	**Jennie**; list of nominees: Wendy; Jeon Yu-jin; Jisoo; Yeji; Yuqi; Chaeyoung; Lisa; Miyeon; IU; and many more
Boy Group	Girl Group
**Enhypen**; list of nominees: BTS; Zerobaseone; EXO; Riize; TWS; Nexz; Treasure; BoyNextDoor; NCT Wish; and many more	**Babymonster**; list of nominees: Aespa; Qwer; Blackpink; Ive; Itzy; TripleS; Twice; Unis; Le Sserafim; and many more
Best Rising Star
Boy	Girl
**AHOF**; list of nominees: KickFlip; Alpha Drive One; Cortis; Close Your Eyes; and many more	**Izna**; list of nominees: Hearts2Hearts; Meovv; Kiiras; KiiiKiii; and many more
UPICK Global Choice
Boy	Girl
**Heeseung**; list of nominees: Ni-Ki (Enhypen); JL (AHOF); Kim Ji-woong (Zerobaseone); V (BTS); Shotaro (Riize); Jay (Enhypen); Zhang Hao (Zerobaseone); Sangwon (Alpha Drive One); Jimin (BTS); Xinlong (Alpha Drive One); Jaehyun (BoyNextDoor); Jungwon (Enhypen); Jungkook (BTS); Jake (Enhypen); Sunoo (Enhypen); Sunghoon (Enhypen); Leo (Alpha Drive One); Jeon Minwook (Close Your Eyes); Suga (BTS); Martin (Cortis); Keonho (Cortis); Seonghyeon (Cortis); Juhoon (Cortis); James (Cortis); Jin (BTS); Dohoon (TWS); Sohee (Riize); Youngjae (TWS); J-Hope (BTS); and many more	**Karina**; list of nominees: Jennie (Blackpink); Sakura (Le Sserafim); Ahyeon (Babymonster); Jang Won-young (Ive); Carmen (Hearts2Hearts); Pharita (Babymonster); Choi Jung-eun (Izna); Lingling (Kiiras); Chiquita (Babymonster); Ian (Hearts2Hearts]); An Yu-jin(Ive); Lee Ji-woo (TripleS); Lisa (Blackpink); Ningning (Aespa); Rora (Babymonster); Rosé (Blackpink); Jisoo (Blackpink); Rami (Babymonster); Asa (Babymonster); Ruka (Babymonster); Ella (Meovv); Winter (Aespa); Dahyun (Twice); Narin (Meovv); Jeong Sae-bi (Izna); Giselle (Aespa); Gawon (Meovv); Liz (Ive); Chodan (QWER); and many more

=== Silver Label ===
Dreams Silver Label

- **AHOF**
- **Allday Project**
- **Close Your Eyes**
- **Cortis**
- **KickFlip**
- **Hearts2Hearts**

D Awards Discovery of the Year
- **AHOF**
- **AxMxP**
- **Chuei Liyu**
- **Hi-Fi Unicorn**

== Multiple awards ==
The following artists has received two or more awards:

Count	Artist(s)
5	Enhypen
4	AHOF
4	BoyNextDoor
4	Izna
4	NCT Wish
4	Zerobaseone
2	82Major
2	Chuei Liyu
2	Fifty Fifty
2	KickFlip
2	Nexz
2	P1Harmony
2	Qwer
2	Xikers
