= AxMxP =

South Korean boy band

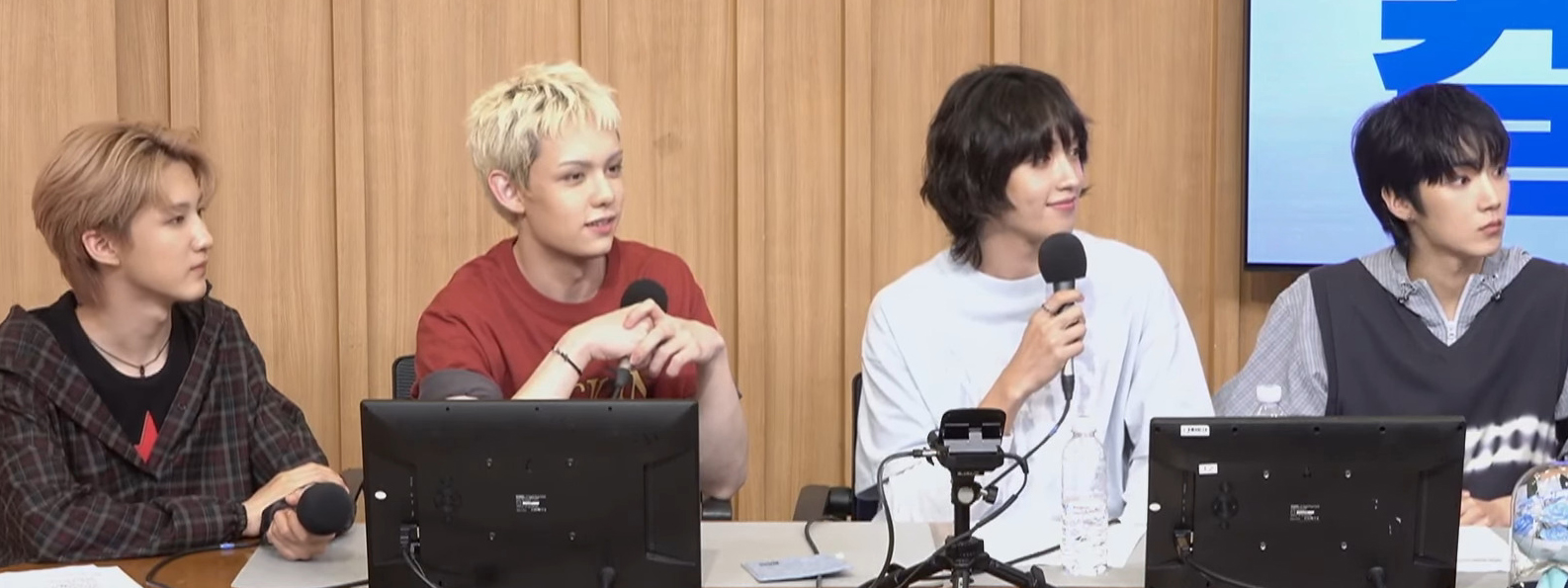
- AxMxP in 2025; From L–R: Juhwan, Cru, Kim Shin, and Ha Yoo-joon

Background information
- Origin: Seoul, South Korea
- Genres: Rock; K-pop; hip-hop
- Years active: 2025–present
- Label: FNC
- Members: Ha Yoo-joon; Cru; Kim Shin; Juhwan
- Website: fncent.com/AxMxP

AxMxP (Korean: 에이엠피; RR: Eiempi; stylized in all caps also as A.M.P) is a South Korean boy band formed and managed by FNC Entertainment. The group consists of four members: Ha Yoo-joon, Cru, Kim Shin and Juhwan. They debuted on September 10, 2025, with the studio album AxMxP.

== Name ==
The name is short for "Amplify Music Power" and represents their goal to project their voices and connect with the world.

== History ==
=== Pre-debut ===
In 2024, FNC Entertainment announced that they would be debuting a four-member boy group by the end of 2025.

Ha Yoo-jun headlined SBS's 2025 drama Spring of Youth. His on-screen performance and event appearances sparked a "monster rookie" buzz across K-drama and K-pop forums prior to his debut.

=== 2025–present: Debut with AxMxP ===
On September 10, 2025, the group debuted with the studio album AxMxP and its lead single "Love Poem" (너는 나를 시인으로 만들어).

== Members ==
- Ha Yoo-joon (하유준) – leader, vocals, rapper
- Cru (크루) – drums
- Kim Shin (김신) – vocals
- Juhwan (주환) – bass

== Discography ==
=== Studio albums ===
List of studio albums, showing selected details, selected chart positions, and sales figures
Title	Details	Peak chart positions	Sales
Title	Details	KOR	Sales
AxMxP	Released: September 10, 2025; Label: FNC Entertainment; Formats: CD, digital download, streaming	11	KOR: 41,953

=== Extended plays ===
List of extended plays, showing selected details, selected chart positions, and sales figures
Title	Details	Peak chart positions	Sales
Title	Details	KOR	Sales
Amplify My Way	Released: January 21, 2026; Label: FNC Entertainment; Formats: CD, digital download, streaming	7	KOR: 30,967
Hello AxMxP	Released: August 12, 2026; Label: FNC Entertainment; Formats: CD, digital download, streaming	7	KOR: 39,090

=== Singles ===
List of singles, showing year released, selected chart positions, and name of the album
Title	Year	Peak chart positions	Album
Title	Year	KOR DL	Album
"Love Poem" (너는 나를 시인으로 만들어)	2025	113	AxMxP
"I Did It"	2025	112	AxMxP
"Shocking Drama"	2025	116	AxMxP
"Pass"	2026	71	Amplify My Way
"Thereafter" (그리고 며칠 후)	2026	72	Amplify My Way
"24 Hours"	2026	—	Non-album single
"10 Reasons"	2026	—	Hello AxMxP

=== Other charted songs ===
List of other charted songs, showing year released, selected chart positions, and name of the album
Title	Year	Peak chart positions	Album
Title	Year	KOR DL	Album
"My Secret Story" (너만 모르는 나의 이야기)	2025	127	AxMxP
"Monday To Sunday"	2025	128	AxMxP
"White T-shirt"	2025	129	AxMxP
"Season of Tears" (우기가 찾아와)	2025	131	AxMxP
"Calling All You"	2025	132	AxMxP
"Headbang"	2025	134	AxMxP
"Buzzer Beater"	2025	135	AxMxP
"Bittersweet" (가끔씩 욕해)	2026	78	Amplify My Way
"I Melody You" (너의 멜로디가 됐어)	2026	80	Amplify My Way
"Be yours" (너의 평소에)	2026	81	Amplify My Way
"Punch-Drunk"	2026	83	Amplify My Way
"Too Much"	2026	84	Amplify My Way

== Awards and nominations ==
Name of the award ceremony, year presented, category, nominee of the award, and the result of the nomination
Award ceremony	Year	Category	Nominee / Work	Result	Ref.
D Awards	2026	Discovery of the Year	AxMxP	Won	
Hanteo Music Awards	2025	Rookie of the Year	AxMxP	Nominated	
