= GY (duo) =

Filipino pop rap duo

- Origin: Manila, Philippines
- Genres: Pinoy hip-hop, RNB, pop
- Years active: 2026–present
- Label: SBTown • Underdog Music
- Members: Gab; Yen

GY is a Filipino pop rap duo composed of Gab and Yen. The name "GY" is derived from the initials of its members and represents their creative partnership. The duo debuted on February 13, 2026, with their first single, "Pamasahe". Both members were previously part of the P-pop boy group PLUUS.

== History ==
=== 2019: Pre-debut and training ===
Gab and Yen began their training under SBTalent Camp in 2019. Over the course of four years, they developed their performance skills while undergoing intensive training designed to prepare them for the demands of the idol industry. Their training emphasized discipline, resilience, and artistic growth.

=== 2023–2025: PLUUS activities ===
Before forming GY, Gab and Yen were members of the six-member P-pop group PLUUS, which debuted in 2023. During their time with the group, they gained experience in live performances, music releases, and fan engagement.

Following a period of inactivity for PLUUS, the members were given the opportunity to pursue individual and collaborative projects. This transition allowed Gab and Yen to explore a new artistic direction as a duo.

=== 2026–present: Debut as GY ===
GY officially debuted on February 13, 2026, with the release of their single "Pamasahe". Their formation marked a new chapter in their careers, highlighting their musical chemistry and shared creative vision.

== Members ==
•Gab

•Yen

== Influences ==
GY has cited a range of influences across hip-hop and pop, including Gloc-9 and Ron Henley in Filipino rap, as well as international pop acts such as One Direction, The Vamps, and 5 Seconds of Summer. The duo has also drawn inspiration from fellow P-pop group SB19.

== Discography ==
=== Singles ===
Title	Year	Album	Ref.
Pamasahe	2026	Non-album single	
Pocket Watcher	2026	Non-album single	
