= Cha Woong-ki =

South Korean singer and actor (born 2002)

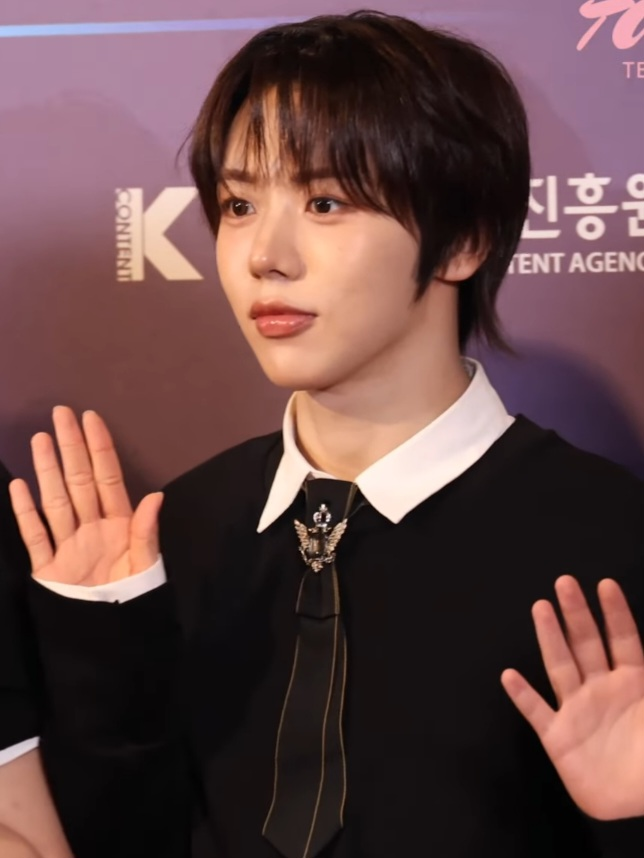
- Cha in August 2025
- Born: Cha Woong-ki; April 23, 2002 (age 24); Seoul, South Korea
- Occupations: Singer; actor
- Years active: 2007–present
- Musical career
- Genre: K-pop
- Years active: 2020–present
- Label: F&F Entertainment
- Member of: AHOF
- Formerly of: TO1

Korean name
- Hangul: 차웅기
- RR: Cha Unggi
- MR: Ch'a Unggi

Stage name
- Hangul: 차재돌
- RR: Cha Jaedol
- MR: Ch'a Chaedol

Cha Woong-ki (Korean: 차웅기; born April 23, 2002) is a South Korean singer and actor. He is a member of the boy group AHOF, formed through the reality competition show Universe League (2024), where he finished in second place. Prior to his idol career, Cha was a child actor, making his debut in the TV Series The King and I (2007). In 2020, he debuted as a member of the K-pop group TO1 (formerly TOO) that was formed through the survival show To Be World Klass before his departure in June 2022. He debuted under the name Woonggi. In 2023, he participated in Boys Planet, placing 20th overall as a result of his elimination in the 11th episode.

== Early life and education ==
Cha Woong-ki was born on April 23, 2002 in Gongneung-dong, Nowon District, Seoul, South Korea. In February 2021, he completed his studies at Hanlim Multi Arts School, where he majored in the Entertainment Department. In the same year, Cha enrolled in the Department of Acting Arts at Dong Seoul University.

== Career ==
=== 2007–2010: Acting debut ===
began his career as a child actor, appearing in various productions between 2007 and 2010, under the stage name Cha Jae-dol. He was well received for his roles as Crown Prince Munhyo in Lee San, Wind of the Palace, the young Lee Sun-woo in Cain and Abel, and Yoon Jung-won in Green Coach. In 2013, he took part in a stage adaptation of The Sound of Music, playing Kurt Von Trapp in performances held in Daegu and Busan.

=== 2019–2022: To Be World Klass and TO1 ===
Cha joined Mnet’s survival show To Be World Klass (also referred to as World Klass) as a contestant in 2019, using the name Woonggi. He secured a debut spot as one of the top ten finalists, ranking fourth overall. The group debuted under the name TOO (later rebranded as TO1) with the mini-album Reason for Being: 仁, released April 1, 2020.

On June 17, 2022, WakeOne Entertainment announced that Cha Woong-ki would leave TO1, along with two other members Minsu and Jerome.

=== 2023: Boys Planet and ties with WakeOne ===
Cha then was represented on the Mnet competition Boys Planet, where he ranked 20th overall. On June 22, 2023, he officially parted ways with WakeOne.

=== 2024–Present: Return to acting, Universe League, and AHOF ===
Cha Woong-ki has then made a return to acting. He was announced as part of the cast for the Boys' Love (BL) web drama titled Love for Love’s Sake. The series aired from January 24 to February 14, 2024.

In October 2024, Cha was announced as one of the 42 contestants on SBS’s Universe League audition program. The show formed three teams: Team Rhythm, Team Groove, and Team Beat. He was drafted by the mentors of Team Beat, which he went on to represent throughout the competition. During the final phase of the competition in January 2025, Team Rhythm won the group battle, resulting in the elimination of Team Groove and Team Beat. Despite this, Cha ranked first among Team Beat members and placed ninth overall as a wildcard member in the show. As a result, he debuted as a member of the boy group AHOF under F&F Entertainment. The group officially debuted on July 1, 2025, with the release of their first album Who We Are.

== Public image ==
=== COVID-19 conduct and public response ===
In early 2021, Cha received attention online for expressing concern in a university group chat regarding a large gathering of incoming freshmen during a period of COVID-19 restrictions in South Korea. Identifying himself by name and academic department, he criticized the decision to hold an in-person drinking party involving over 20 students, citing health and safety concerns. His comments were met with ridicule from some participants, and he subsequently left the chat. The conversation was later circulated on student community forums, where it was revealed that Cha was a member of the boy group TOO. The incident drew widespread online support, with many internet users commending his stance as responsible and principled. His actions were highlighted in media coverage as an example of socially conscious behavior among public figures.

== Discography ==
=== Soundtrack appearances ===
| Title | Year | Album |
|---|---|---|
| "Love for Love's Sake" (with 승현) | 2024 | Love for Love's Sake OST Part 1 |

=== Songwriting credits ===
| Title | Year | Artist | Lyricist? | Composer? | Album | Ref. |
|---|---|---|---|---|---|---|
| "SuperCharger" | 2023 | NINTYSIX | Yes | No | Boys Planet – Artist Battle | |
| "Dreaming" | 2025 | Universe League | Yes | No | Universe League – W.A.R. (We Are Ready) | |
| "Rendezvous" (그곳에서 다시 만나기로 해) | 2025 | AHOF | Yes | No | Who We Are | |
| "Never Lose You" (다신 너를 잃지 않게) | 2025 | AHOF | Yes | No | The Passage | |
| "Our Story" | 2026 | AHOF | Yes | No | Run to You | |

== Filmography ==
=== TV series ===
| Year | Title | Role | Notes | Ref. |
|---|---|---|---|---|
| 2007 | Golden Bride | | Credited as Cha Jae-dol | |
| 2007 | Daughters-in-Law | | Credited as Cha Jae-dol | |
| 2007 | The King and I | | Credited as Cha Jae-dol | |
| 2007 | Lee San, Wind of the Palace | Crown Prince Munhyo | Credited as Cha Jae-dol | |
| 2008 | Strongest Chil Woo | Han Do-yeong | Credited as Cha Jae-dol | |
| 2008 | On Air | | Credited as Cha Jae-dol | |
| 2009 | Empress Cheonchu | young Gyeongjong of Goryeo | Credited as Cha Jae-dol | |
| 2009 | The Road Home | | Credited as Cha Jae-dol | |
| 2009 | Cain and Abel | | Credited as Cha Jae-dol | |
| 2009 | Green Coach | | Credited as Cha Jae-dol | |
| 2010 | Jejungwon | young Hwang Jung | Credited as Cha Jae-dol | |
| 2010 | Definitely Neighbors | Song Jun-seo | Credited as Cha Jae-dol | |

=== Web series ===
| Year | Title | Role | Notes | Reference |
|---|---|---|---|---|
| 2024 | Love for Love's Sake | Ahn Kyung-hoon | Supporting role | |

=== TV shows ===
| Year | Title | Role | Notes | Reference |
|---|---|---|---|---|
| 2019 | To Be World Klass | Contestant | Finished 4th and debuted as member of TO1 | |
| 2023 | Boys Planet | Contestant | Finished 20th (Eliminated) | |
| 2023 | King of Mask Singer | Contestant | | |
| 2024 | Universe League | Contestant | Finished 9th and debuted as member of AHOF | |

=== Music video appearances ===
| Year | Title | Artist | Notes | Reference |
|---|---|---|---|---|
| 2011 | Whenever I see You(널 볼때마다) | Kang Kyun-sung(강균성) | | |
| 2016 | The Love(더럽) | DIA(다이아) | | |
| 2024 | Our Season(우리의 계절) | iaaa(이아) | | |
