= AxMxP (album) =

- Digital cover

Studio album by AxMxP
- Released: September 10, 2025
- Genres: Pop rock; rock; punk rock; hip-hop
- Length: 28:34
- Languages: Korean; English
- Label: FNC Entertainment

AxMxP chronology
AxMxP (2025)	Amplify My Way (2026)

Singles from AxMxP
- 1. "I Did it" Released: September 10, 2025; 2. "Shocking Drama" Released: September 17, 2025; 3. "너는 나를 시인으로 만들어 (Love Poem)" Released: September 24, 2025

AxMxP is the debut studio album by South Korean boy band AxMxP. It was released on September 10, 2025, by FNC Entertainment. The album consists of ten tracks, including the title track, "너는 나를 시인으로 만들어 (Love Poem)".

== Background ==
AxMxP's debut album and first full-length album, AxMxP, is themed around the "emotional storm," a whirlwind of colorful emotions that unexpectedly surges into the seemingly colorless lives of teenage boys. From the burning confidence that transcends limits, to the sparkle of unpredictable moments, to the subtle attraction toward someone and the thrill of first-time love, the album captures the unstoppable turmoil of fleeting, unfamiliar emotions.

The 10-track package includes three lead tracks: "I Did It," "너는 나를 시인으로 만들어 (Love Poem)" and "Shocking Drama." The band's lead vocalist, Ha Yoo-joon, co-wrote the lyrics for the B-side track "Headbang."

We are truly excited about what is ahead. We will try our best, and I hope people will continue to look forward to it and support us along the way!

— Cru told reporters during a media showcase held at the Olympic Park Olympic Hall in Songpa-gu.

I hope we can win the once-in-a-lifetime award with our debut album.

— Ha Yoo-joon said the band hopes to win the rookie of the year award.

== Commercial performance ==
The studio album sold 63,000+ copies in South Korea. It peaked at number 11 on the Circle Album Chart.

== Track listing ==
AxMxP track listing
No.	Title	Lyrics	Music	Length
1.	"Calling All You"	Han Sung -ho	Han Sung-ho; Ko Jin-young; Papertonic; Calle Lehmann; Adam seuba	2:47
2.	"너는 나를 시인으로 만들어" (Love Poem)	Han Sung-ho; Seo Yong-bae (SESAMIX)	Han Sung-ho; Seo Yong-bae (SESAMIX); CYD	3:12
3.	"White T-shirt"	Sesamix; CYD	Sesamix; CYD	2:56
4.	"우기가 찾아와" (Season of Tears)	Han Sung-ho; Seo Yong-bae (SESAMIX)	Han Sung-ho; SESAMIX; Jacob Aaron (the Hub); Feli Ferraro	2:35
5.	"너만 모르는 나의 이야기" (My Secret Story)	Han Sung-ho; Seo Yong-bae (SESAMIX)	Han Sung-ho; Seo Yong-bae (SESAMIX); Park Soo-seok; CYD	2:45
6.	"Shocking Drama"	Han Sung-ho; Seo Yong-bae (SESAMIX)	Han Sung-ho; Ko Jin-young; Park Soo-seok; Calle Lehmann; Jacob Aaron (the Hub)	2:20
7.	"Monday To Sunday"	Han Sung-ho	Phil Schwan; WaveShower; Jacob Aaron (The Hub); Ayushy (The Hub)	3:35
8.	"Headbang"	Han Sung-ho; Yoo-jun Ha	Han Sung-ho; Slyberry; Shin Kung; Ko Jin-young; Rapid; Patrick 'J.QUE' Smith; Jacob Aaron (the Hub)	2:33
9.	"I Did It"	Han Sung-ho	Nathan Cunningham; Marc Sibley; Frankie Day (the Hub); Jordain Johnson; Je'juan Antonio; Hautboard	2:56
10.	"Buzzer Beater"	Han Sung-ho; Hong In-ho	Han Sung-ho; Park Soo-seok; TAEY (Logos); Patrick 'J.QUE' Smith	2:55
Total length:				28:34

== Charts ==
Weekly chart performance for AxMxP
Chart (2025)	Peak position
South Korean Albums (Circle)	11
