= JL Gaspar =

Filipino singer and dancer (born 2004)

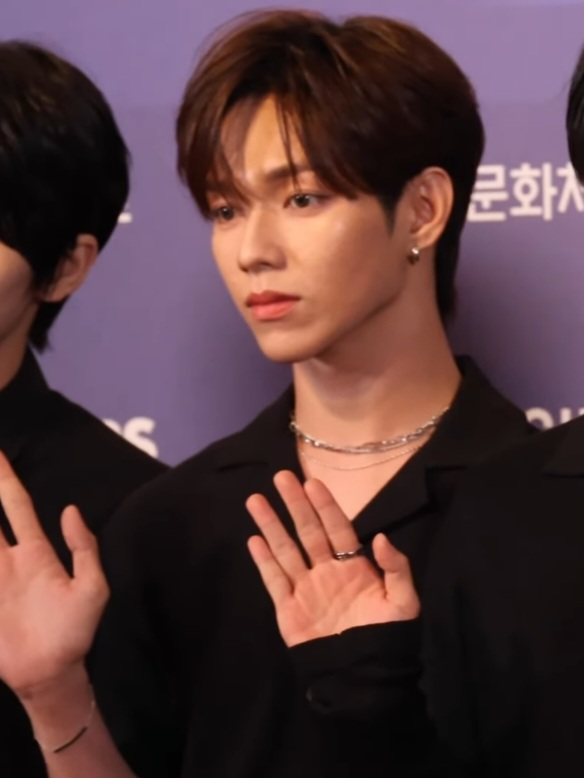
- Born: Jay Lawrence Gaspar; April 21, 2004 (age 22); Muntinlupa, Philippines
- Occupations: Performer; Singer; Dancer
- Musical career
- Genres: K-pop; P-pop; Ballad
- Years active: 2023–present
- Labels: SBTown; Universal Philippines; F&F Entertainment
- Member of: AHOF
- Formerly of: PLUUS

Jay Lawrence Gaspar (Korean: 제이엘; born April 21, 2004) is a Filipino singer, dancer, and performer. In 2025, he won first place on the South Korean survival show Universe League receiving over 3 million votes, and subsequently debuted as a member of the K-pop boy group AHOF. Prior to this, on March 31, 2023, he debuted as the youngest member of the P-pop boy group PLUUS.

== Life and career ==
=== Early life ===
Jay Lawrence Gaspar was born on April 21, 2004 and raised in Muntinlupa, Philippines. He has three siblings and completed his secondary education at Muntinlupa National High School. Prior to his debut, he joined a local dance group, where he gained experience in various dance styles.

=== 2021–2023: Career beginnings and PLUUS ===
Gaspar began training under SBTalent Camp in 2019 and was introduced publicly as the thirteenth trainee on September 26, 2021. While training under SBTalent Camp, he was mentored by SBTown CEO Geong Seong Han and trainer Adie Hong, both recognized for their involvement in the development of the P-pop group SB19. After four years of training, he was announced on February 8, 2023, as a member of SBTown's first boy group, Pluus. He is the youngest member of the group and has been nicknamed the "Nation's Giant Center". The group officially debuted on March 31, with their first extended play, PLUUS +.Y.M.

=== 2024–present: Universe League and AHOF ===
In September 2024, during the Pluus In-Motion fan meeting, Gaspar announced that he had successfully auditioned for a K-pop survival program, though the specific show was not disclosed at the time. Then, on October 14, 2024, he was revealed as a contestant on Universe League, a reality competition program produced by SBS, through a concept trailer released on the show's official YouTube channel. The following day, profiles for all 42 contestants were published, including Gaspar. In the early stages of the show, participants were selected by mentors representing three teams: Team Beat, Team Groove, and Team Rhythm. Gaspar was the only contestant drafted by mentors from all three teams and ultimately joined Team Rhythm.

As the competition progressed, he consistently received strong support in global voting. (Note: Gaspar received approximately 38,000 votes in the first global voting round, placing second overall. He ranked first in the following global voting rounds, with 462,150 votes in the second, 1,099,728 in the third, and 3,168,841 in the final round.) On January 24, 2025, Team Rhythm was named the winning team in the finale, which granted its members the opportunity to debut. As a result, Gaspar was confirmed as a member of the boy group AHOF, managed by F&F Entertainment. The group officially debuted on July 1, 2025, with the release of their first extended play, Who We Are.

Aside from his group activities, on June 6, Universal Records Philippines released "Alon", which Gaspar recorded in 2024 before auditioning for Universe League. Described as a pop ballad, the song centers on themes of transition and letting go. It has been interpreted as a "farewell to his time with PLUUS and a meaningful introduction to his new journey as a member" of AHOF. Within ten days of release, the single surpassed 400,000 streams on Spotify. It was later selected as the theme song for the Tagalog-dubbed broadcast of the Korean drama, Lovely Runner.

== Public image ==
=== Ambassadorships ===
I Like It Korea Milk (Korea Dairy Committee): In June 2025, Gaspar was appointed as a promotional ambassador for the Korea Dairy Committee’s “I Like It Korea Milk” campaign, aimed at promoting Korean dairy products internationally.

PURIQUE Premium Salon: In August 2025, JL became the first ambassador for the K-Beauty service brand PURIQUE in the Philippines. His debut advertisement for the brand was launched at their Bonifacio High Street branch in Taguig.

=== Representation in K-pop ===
Gaspar has received attention for incorporating aspects of Filipino culture into his public persona as a K-pop idol. As one of the few Filipino artists active in the South Korean music industry, his inclusion in AHOF has been highlighted as part of a growing trend of increased Southeast Asian representation in K-pop, reflecting the industry's expanding global focus and efforts to engage audiences in regions such as the Philippines, Vietnam, and Indonesia.

He has referenced Filipino internet culture during live broadcasts and televised performances, notably by recreating popular meme gestures such as the "Alden tongue pose", the "AlDub pose", and a pose associated with internet personality Mimiyuuuh. Some of these expressions have also been adopted by fellow AHOF members during livestreams and stage appearances. In addition, Gaspar has expressed his fondness for Filipino food, particularly instant pancit canton noodles and pandesal, and has introduced these to other idols, including fellow AHOF member Steven.

Although, he has adapted quickly to life in South Korea and conducts most of his activities in Korean, Gaspar has also used Tagalog during promotional events, particularly in interviews. He has occasionally switched to Filipino in casual interactions, such as backstage moments and airport appearances. These instances have been viewed by fans and commentators as expressions of cultural pride, contributing to his image as a relatable figure among Filipino audiences.

== Discography ==
=== Singles ===
Title	Year	Album	Ref.
"Alon"	2025	Non-album single	

== Filmography ==
=== Video appearances ===
Year	Title	Artist	Role	Ref.
2024	"DayDream"	Darlene Vibares	Himself	
2024	"We Ready"	Universe League	Performer	

=== Television ===
Year	Title	Role	Note(s)	Ref.
2024-2025	Universe League	Contestant	Finished in first place	
