= D Awards =

Annual award ceremony in South Korea

- Previous: 2nd D Awards; February 11, 2026
- Awarded for: Outstanding achievements in the K-pop industry
- Location: Seoul
- Country: South Korea
- Presented by: Sports Dong-A; WSM
- First award: February 22, 2025; 20 months ago

D Awards (Korean: 디 어워즈) is an annual award ceremony established in 2025 by Sports Dong-a (a sister brand of the Dong-a Ilbo) for excellence in K-pop music in South Korea.

== History ==
D Awards was first announced in December 2024 as the award which was established to further promote and inspire K-pop, believing that it was faithful to provide 'Dream' and 'Delights' as the reason why it was loved by people all over the world. It was reported that D Awards will have special two categories: 'D Awards Delights' which was given to the outstanding K-pop artist throughout the year and 'D Awards Dreamers' which was given to the aspiring new K-pop artist who will lead the industry in the future. D Awards offers three varieties of trophies featuring hexahedron design, each in a distinct color derived from the awards' symbolic color: 'black' for the grand prizes, 'blue' for the main prizes and best sub-award categories, and 'silver' for the emerging K-pop artists.

The 1st D Awards was held on February 22, 2025 with Go Min-si and Lee Jong-won as the presenters.

== Ceremonies ==
List of D Awards award ceremonies
Edition	Year	Date	Venue	Location	Ref.
1st	2025	February 22, 2025	Korea University Hwajeong Gymnasium	Seoul, South Korea	
2nd	2026	February 11, 2026	Korea University Hwajeong Gymnasium	Seoul, South Korea	

== Awards categories ==
- Black Label (Grand prizes)
  - Artist of the Year
  - Song of the Year
  - Album of the Year
  - Record of the Year
  - Performance of the Year
  - Trend of the Year
  - Rookie of the Year (2025)
  - D Awards Iconic
  - D Awards Global
- Blue Label (Main prizes)
  - Delights Blue Label
  - D Awards Impact
  - Best Band
  - Best Choreography
  - Best Group
  - Best OST
  - Best Stage
  - Best Tour
  - Best Video
  - Best Solo Popularity Award (Boy / Girl)
  - Best Group Popularity Award (Boy / Girl)
  - Best Rising Star (Boy / Girl)
  - UPICK Global Choice (Boy / Girl)
- Silver Label (Emerging artists)
  - Dreams Silver Label
  - D Awards Discovery of the Year
  - D Awards Remark (2025)

== Grand prizes (Daesang) ==
List of winners of the grand prizes
Edition	Year	Winner									Ref.
Edition	Year	Artist of the Year	Song of the Year	Album of the Year	Record of the Year	Performance of the Year	Trend of the Year	Rookie of the Year	D Awards Iconic	D Awards Global	Ref.
1st	2025	Seventeen	Aespa – "Supernova"	Enhypen – Romance: Untold	Zerobaseone – Cinema Paradise	Riize	QWER	NCT Wish, TWS	SM Entertainment	—	
2nd	2026	Enhypen	BoyNextDoor – "If I Say, I Love You"	Stray Kids – Karma	Riize – Odyssey	NCT Wish	TWS	—	Zerobaseone	P1Harmony	

== Most awarded artists ==
The following artists (arranged in alphanumeric order) has received four or more awards.

Awards	Artist
11	Enhypen
8	Zerobaseone
6	NCT Wish
5	P1Harmony
5	QWER
5	Riize
5	TWS
4	82Major
4	Aespa
4	AHOF
4	BoyNextDoor
4	Fifty Fifty
4	Izna
4	KickFlip
