= Universe League =

South Korean reality competition series

- Hangul: 유니버스 리그
- RR: Yunibeoseu rigeu
- MR: Yunibŏsŭ rigŭ
- Genre: Reality competition
- Created by: SBS
- Directed by: Park Jung-sik
- Presented by: Jay Park
- Opening theme: "We Ready" by Universe League contestants
- Country of origin: South Korea
- Original language: Korean
- No. of seasons: 2
- No. of episodes: 10

Production
- Production companies: Prism Studios; F&F Entertainment

Original release
- Network: SBS TV
- Release: November 22, 2024 – January 24, 2025

Related
- Universe Ticket (2023–2024)

Universe League (Korean: 유니버스 리그) is a 2024–2025 South Korean reality competition show created by SBS. The show followed the process of creating a new boy group. It premiered on SBS TV on November 22, 2024, and aired every Friday at 23:20 (KST). In the finale on January 24, 2025, which was broadcast live, the show announced the final nine members who would debut as AHOF (a backronym for All-time Hall Of Famer) and will be managed by F&F Entertainment.

The show served as a sequel to Universe Ticket, this time featuring all male contestants.

== Production ==
=== Conception and development ===
Universe League was developed as the second season to Universe Ticket, which formed the girl group Unis. The second season was first teased during the Universe Ticket finale on January 17, 2024, with a promotional video revealing the title Universe League. On January 22, F&F Entertainment, in partnership with Prism Studios, confirmed their involvement and announced that preparations for the second season were underway, with plans to air the show on SBS later in the year. Building on the success of its predecessor, the format was restructured to focus on team-based competition, drawing inspiration from professional sports leagues. F&F Entertainment CEO Choi Jae-woo emphasized this shift in focus, stating that the goal was to highlight collaboration within the teams rather than individual popularity. Additionally, the format incorporated a system of starting and bench players, designed to "encourage participant's competitive drive and motivation to succeed". (Note: Original text:여기 주전과 벤치라는 시스템까지 활용해 모두의 승부욕과 경쟁을 동시에 부추기게 되었습니다.) The ultimate goal for each team is to win the Prism Cup, securing their debut as a professional idol group.

=== Casting ===
Casting for Universe League began on April 22, 2024, with applications open to individuals born before 2011, setting the minimum age requirement at 14 years. There were no restrictions on career, affiliation, or nationality, allowing both trainees and independent artists to participate. In addition to direct applications, the production team encouraged viewers to recommend potential contestants through the show's official social media channels, with submissions accepted until June 30, 2024. To generate interest in the auditions, the production team released a series of promotional videos in June 2024, featuring Universe Ticket mentors Hyoyeon and Kim Se-jeong, as well as artists like Oneus, ONF, STAYC, Unis's Nana, and WayV's Xiaojun. These videos were shared on the show's official platforms to broaden the reach of the casting call.

After the application period closed, the final roster of 42 contestants was revealed on October 15. At the show's press conference on November 19, producer Lee Hwan-jin explained that the decision to limit the contestant pool to 42 was made to allow for more selective casting, focusing on factors like appearance, talent, and star potential. This smaller roster was intended to ensure each contestant would have sufficient screen time over the show's 10-episode run.

Meanwhile, as preparations for the main competition continued, SBS began unveiling the lineup of senior K-pop artists who would serve as the show's host and team directors. The competition is divided into three main teams: Team Beat, Team Groove, and Team Rhythm. On August 8, Jay Park was announced as the host, chosen for his prior hosting experience on the first season of The Seasons. This was followed by the confirmation of Lee Chang-sub as the team director for Team Groove, Yugyeom as the team director for Team Beat, and Ten and Yangyang as co-directors for Team Rhythm. On October 16, producer El Capitxn was also announced as a co-director for Team Beat, joining Yugyeom. Additionally, WayV members Kun and Xiaojun made appearances as guest directors for Team Rhythm, while rapper Punchnello served as a guest director for Team Beat.

=== Competition format and voting ===
The competition followed a multi-stage structure referred to as PRISM, an acronym representing the first five stages of the show: Pick, Represent, Intercept, (Note: In episode 3, "Intercept" was translated in Korean as Korean: 빼앗다, which roughly translates to "to seize" or "to take away". In news articles, it stage is referred to as Korean: 인터셉트 지목식, which roughly translates to "Intercept Selection" or "Intercept Nomination Ceremony".) Seven, and Move. The final stage was titled WAR, short for We Are Ready. Contestants, referred to as players (Korean: 선수), progressed through these stages by competing in both individual and team-based challenges. The competition began with a draft process during the Pick stage, where team directors selected players to form their respective teams. The next three stages—Represent (Round 1), Intercept (Round 2), and Seven (Round 3)—featured performance-based rounds. Player rankings and eliminations were determined through a combination of live audience scores, global online voting, and decisions made by team directors. Online voting was conducted through the KTOPSTAR and HIGHER aps, as well as the official SBS website. The final two stages, Move and WAR, served to finalize the lineup of debuting members.

The Pick stage was divided into two parts. In the first part, the 42 contestants were divided into seven groups of six, with each group performing as a unit. After each performance, team directors selected their "first picks" (Korean: 퍼스트픽) from the performing group. If multiple directors chose the same player, the player chose which team to join. Directors not selected by the player then moved on to recruit their second picks from the same group. This process continued until all teams filled their initial starting lineup. In the second part of the Pick stage, referred to as the "bench test" (Korean: 벤치테스트), the 21 remaining contestants who had not been selected underwent one-on-one assessments by the team directors. Based on these evaluations, directors selected additional players to form their bench units. Contestants not chosen during this phase were eliminated from the competition. This completed the team formation process and initiated the performance-based stages of the show.

In Represent (Round 1), both the starting lineup and bench unit of each team performed songs released by their respective team directors in front of a live audience. Matches were held between starting lineups and between bench units. Audience members scored individual contestants after each performance. The highest-scoring contestant from each team was named MVP, and individual scores were totaled to determine the team's score. The combined scores of each team's starting lineup and bench unit determined the overall team rankings for the round. Intercept (Round 2) introduced original songs produced by each team director for their respective starting lineups. Each starting lineup competed in a head-to-head match against a bench unit from another team that selected the same song. The winning unit earned the right to officially record and release their version of the song on streaming platforms. Team rankings for this round were based on a both audience scores and online votes collected during the first global voting period, held from November 11 to November 17. In Seven (Round 3), each team presented two performances, with the team directors selecting seven-member units for each. Contestants not selected for either performance received a score of zero from the audience for that round. Rankings were again determined by a combination of audience scores and online votes, with the second global voting period held from November 22 to December 21.

After each performance round, cumulative individual scores—either based on audience scores alone or in combination with online voting—determined each player's placement within their team. This resulted in internal team reshuffling, in which contestants could be moved between the starting lineup and the bench unit. Following the reshuffling, yellow cards were issued to lower-ranking teams. The second-place team received three yellow cards, assigned to its three lowest-ranked members, while the third-place team received six yellow cards. Any contestant who accumulated two yellow cards was eliminated immediately. After eliminations, team trades were conducted. The team director of the first-place team was allowed to trade two players from their team with players from the second- and third-place teams. The team director of the second-place team was permitted to trade one player with the third-place team.

In the Move stage, only seven players from each team advanced to the final stage, totaling 21 finalists. Selection was based on a combination of online votes from the third global voting period, held from December 21, 2024, to January 11, 2025, and team directors' selections. The number of players each team could retain was determined by its overall ranking after Rounds 1 to 3. The first-ranking team retained five members, based on the five highest-voted players; the second-ranking team retained three; and the third-ranking team retained one. Team directors then filled the remaining roster spots in order of team ranking. Contestants not selected at this stage were eliminated. This led into the final stage, titled WAR or We Are Ready, where each team performed twice. The winning team was determined through final global voting, conducted from January 18 to January 24. Along with the winning team, the top-ranked contestant from each of the two non-winning teams also joined the debut lineup, resulting in a nine-member group. The name of the debut was announced as AHOF, an acronym for All-time Hall Of Famer.

== Contestants ==
A total of 42 contestants participated in the show, including agency trainees, former and current idols, and independent artists from South Korea, Japan, China, Thailand, Australia, and the Philippines. Referred to as "players," their English names are listed below as presented on the official website.

Color Key:

Final members of AHOF
Contestants eliminated in the final episode
Contestants eliminated in the third elimination round
Contestants eliminated in the second elimination round
Contestants eliminated in the first elimination round

42 contestants
JL (제이엘)	Steven (스티븐)	Zhang Shuaibo (张帅博 / 장슈아이보)	Park Ju-won (박주원)
Seo Jeong-woo (서정우)	Chih En (志恩 / 즈언)	Daisuke (大輔 / 다이스케)	Cha Woong-ki (차웅기)
Park Han (박한)	Jang Kyung-ho (장경호)	Kim Joo-hyoung (김주형)	Kwon Hee-jun (권희준)
Kenta (賢太 / 켄타)	Kairi (魁里 / 카이리)	Koo Han-seo (구한서)	Kim Gi-joong (김기중)
Sirin (สิริน / 시린)	Yuito (唯人 / 유이토)	Keum Jin-ho (금진호)	Kim Dong-yun (김동윤)
Zen Zen (젠젠)	Li Zhinuo (李知诺/ 리쯔누오)	Eito (栄人 / 에이토)	Xie Yuxin (解雨鑫 / 시웨이신)
Ayumu (あゆむ / 아유무)	Mac (맥)	Kim Dae-yun (김대윤)	Bae Jae-ho (배재호)
An Yul (안율)	James (เจมส์ / 제임스)	Nam Do-yoon (남도윤)	He Junjin (何俊锦 / 허쥔진)
Yeo Gang-dong (여강동)	Hiroto (ヒロト / 히로토)	Kim Hyo-tae (김효태)	Li Zhiwei (李致伟 / 리쯔웨이)
Jin Ziming (晋子铭 / 진즈밍)	Royce (로이스)	Jiang Fan (姜帆 / 지앙판)	Park Ji-hun (박지훈)
Kang Jun-hyuk (강준혁)	Park Yeon-jun (박연준)		

== Episodes ==
No.	Title	Original release date	Average audience share (Nielsen Korea)
1	"Episode.01"	November 22, 2024	0.7%
Universe League is a K-pop survival show built around a league-style format, with 42 contestants divided into 3 teams. The show begins with "Pick", the first stage out of the five stages in P.R.I.S.M. The contestants form teams through a draft process and showcase their skills. The picked trainees form the "Starting Players". Those who are not picked need to wait until the mentors pick them to form the "Bench Players" of each team.
2	"Episode.02"	November 29, 2024	0.7%
Right after the judges picked and formed their starting players, its time for them to choose their bench players to complete the team. The second stage from P.R.I.S.M, "Represent", is introduced. The teams are given songs that each player needs to perform, and the winning team is decided through voting by the studio audience. Starting players perform first and "Team Rhythm" was declared as the winner.
3	"Episode.03"	December 6, 2024	0.6%
The bench players perform and "Team Groove" is declared as the winner. Combining the scores of starting and bench players, "Team Groove" emerges as the overall winner of the "Represent" round. After the performances, the three teams are rearranged based on the number of votes each player received. Yellow cards are given to those who have the fewest votes. Players ranked 1–7 will be the starting players, while contestants ranked 8–14 will be the bench players. Yellow cards are given based on the results of the "Represent" round. The team which ranked second is given three yellow cards, while the team which ranked third is given six yellow cards. If a contestant receives two yellow cards, they are immediately eliminated. Additionally, the trading system is also introduced. Teams are given trade tickets to choose the players that they want for their team. Trade tickets are given based on the results of the current round. The team who ranked first is given two trade tickets, while the team who ranked second is given one trade ticket.
4	"Episode.04"	December 13, 2024	0.5%
It is now time to begin the next stage, "Intercept". In this round, the starting players are given original songs composed by the directors of the team. The bench players are given a chance to choose which team they will intercept or compete with. Just like the last round, live votes from on-site voters determine the teams that will get the opportunity to release the original songs.
5	"Episode.05"	December 20, 2024	0.5%
The performance of the players continued with a mix of emotions. Some teams were unable to get and secure the song, while others are happy that they were able to get and release the original song given to them. Right after the performance, it is now time to rearrange the players once again and determine who will get yellow cards. Some contestants were eventually eliminated after they received two yellow cards.
6	"Episode.06"	December 27, 2024.	0.6%
To celebrate this holiday season, contestants take a break from intense competition to participate in festive-themed challenges and performances. The episode features heartwarming moments as the trainees bond over holiday traditions, engage in exciting and fun games, and showcase their talents through Christmas carol covers and dance performance. While still maintaining the competitive spirit, the holiday special focuses on camaraderie, growth, and celebrating the season, leaving both contestants and viewers with a sense of warmth and unity.
7	"Episode.07"	January 10, 2025	0.4%
The next stage of P.R.I.S.M, the "SEVEN" round, is about to begin. Following their performance in the previous round, the mentors will form two 7-member groups, each performing two songs on stage. Rankings don't affect the groupings, so both starting and bench players may end up in the same team. The mentors also have the option to make changes to the lineup before the performance. Only the contestants chosen to perform are eligible for live votes, and if a player is selected for both songs, they will receive double scores.
8	"Episode.08"	January 17, 2025	0.7%
As the seven round unfolds, the atmosphere becomes charged with tension and excitement, gripping players, mentors, and the audience alike. Following the energetic and captivating performances of the groups representing Unit 2, the much-anticipated moment arrives when the scores and overall standings are to be revealed. Amid the unexpected developments, the trading phase begins, introducing an additional layer of strategy and unpredictability to the competition. During this phase, players are issued yellow cards as penalties for certain infractions or underperformance. The tension escalates further as some players, after receiving two yellow cards, are ultimately eliminated from the competition. The unfolding events leave the audience in suspense, while players and mentors are compelled to adapt their strategies to navigate the high-stakes environment.
9	"Episode.09"	January 18, 2025	0.2%
This episode marks the beginning of the final round of P.R.I.S.M.: "Move". The top 21 players were determined through a combination of fan votes and the producers' selections. Players chosen via fan votes varied depending on their team's overall ranking, based on the combined votes from Rounds 1 to 3. Team Rhythm secured first place overall, earning the opportunity to select five players through fan votes. Team Groove, which ranked second, was able to select three players, while Team Beat, in third place, could select just one player. After this process, the producers were given the opportunity to finalize the teams. Regardless of previous trades, they could select players from any team to complete the lineup that will compete in the final episode.
10	"Episode.10"	January 24, 2025	0.5%
The final stage of the Universe League, titled "W.A.R. (We Are Ready)", has officially begun. This decisive round is the ultimate opportunity to claim the prestigious P.R.I.S.M Cup. For this stage, the directors have selected two songs for each team, which will be performed by the 21 finalists. The winners will be determined based on the total votes accumulated during the Final Voting Period and the live voting session. The team with the highest votes will secure victory. Additionally, two players with the most votes from the two losing teams will join the debut group, forming a new 9-member boy band called AHOF, an abbreviation for "All-time Hall Of Famer".

== Overall ranking ==
=== Ranking summary ===
The rankings were based on various methods. Round 1 was based solely on on-site votes, Round 3 was a combination of both online and on-site votes, while Round 2, the pre-finale ranking, and the final round were all based solely on online public votes.

Color Key:

New Top 9 (Note: Indicates contestants who had never placed in the Top 9 in any prior elimination rounds or ranking announcements.)
Eliminated Contestant

List of Top 9 contestants
#	Round 1			Round 2			Round 3			Pre-Finale			Final Round		
#	Contestant	T	Votes	Contestant	T	Votes	Contestant	T	Votes	Contestant	T	Votes	Contestant	T	Votes
1	Park; Juwon	R	287	Cha; Woongki (▲3)	B	41,870	JL (▲1)	R	462,605	JL	R	1,099,728	JL	R	3,168,841
2	Seo; Jeongwoo	G	245	JL (▲7)	R	38,057	Cha; Woongki (▼1)	B	265,619	Steven (▲1)	R	598,718	Steven (Note: Although Steven, Zhang Shuaibo, Park Ju-won, Seo Jeong-woo, Chih En, and Daisuke ranked 4th, 5th, 6th, 7th, 10th, and 14th, respectively, in public votes, they were placed second through seventh as members of Team Rhythm, the winning team.)	R	313,965
3	Kwon; Heejun	R	226	Zhang; Shuaibo (▲5)	R	25,662	Steven (▲1)	R	248,678	Zhang; Shuaibo (▲2)	R	525,193	Zhang; Shuaibo	R	245,615
4	Cha; Woongki	B	219	Steven (▲10)	R	24,199	Park; Han (▲11)	G	220,084	Chih; En (▲2)	R	504,012	Park; Juwon (▲2)	R	225,105
5	Kim; Gijoong	G	213	Chih; En (▲6)	R	22,663	Zhang; Shuaibo (▼2)	R	196,106	Park; Han (▼1)	G	467,242	Seo; Jeongwoo (▲9)	R	173,779
6	Kenta	G	197	Kenta	G	19,423	Chih; En (▼1)	R	190,968	Park; Juwon (▲1)	R	414,534	Chih; En (▼2)	R	146,731
7	Hiroto	G	193	Jang; Kyungho (▲11)	G	15,502	Park; Juwon (▲2)	G	172,267	Cha; Woongki (▼5)	B	400,554	Daisuke(▲1)	R	104,925
8	Zhang; Shuaibo	R	191	Seo; Jeongwoo (▼6)	G	14,179	Seo; Jeongwoo	G	127,671	Daisuke (▲3)	R	298,630	Park; Han (Note: Although Cha Woong-ki and Park Han ranked 2nd and 3rd, respectively, in public votes, they belonged to losing teams (Team Beat and Team Groove). They then joined the debut lineup because they received the highest number of votes within their respective teams.) (▼3)	G	504,261
9	JL	R	189	Park; Juwon (▼8)	R	13,426	Kenta (▼3)	G	122,468	Li; Zhinuo (Note: Li Zhinuo was eliminated during the pre-finale ranking despite ranking ninth as the public voting result only gave five slots at maximum and Team Rhythm, despite being given the maximum slots, had maxed out their slots due to the number of contestants in the team at a higher rank. The remaining slots were selected by the directors, who were unaware of the rankings during the time of selection.) (▲17)	R	224,403	Cha; Woongki (▼2)	B	677,202

=== Round 1 ===
Player rankings are based on votes from a live audience of 300 during the Round 1 performances. Three players from the 2nd place team and six from the 3rd place team receive Yellow Cards. A second Yellow Card in any mission results in elimination, regardless of ranking.

Key:

-	Yellow Card (1)

Rank	Team	Name	Votes	Rank	Team	Name	Votes
1	Rhythm	Park Juwon	287	22	Rhythm	Daisuke	156
2	Groove	Seo Jeongwoo	245	23	Groove	Kim Daeyun	153
3	Rhythm	Kwon Heejun	226	24	Groove	Kim Joohyoung	150
4	Beat	Cha Woongki	219	25	Rhythm	Ayumu	150
5	Groove	Kim Gijoong	213	26	Beat	Keum Jinho	150
6	Groove	Kenta	197	27	Rhythm	Xie Yuxin	139
7	Groove	Hiroto	193	28	Rhythm	Jin Ziming	134
8	Rhythm	Zhang Shuaibo	191	29	Rhythm	Sirin	132
9	Rhythm	JL	189	30	Rhythm	Eito	132
10	Groove	Yeo Gangdong	182	31	Rhythm	Li Zhinuo	130
11	Beat	Chih En	180	32	Beat	Park Yeonjun	129
12	Groove	Park Han	178	33	Groove	James	126
13	Beat	Anyul	177	34	Beat	Kim Hyotae	116
14	Rhythm	Steven	173	35	Rhythm	Mac	112
15	Groove	Bae Jaeho	171	36	Groove	Zen Zen	107
16	Beat	Kairi	171	37	Rhythm	Royce	106
17	Groove	He Junjin	170	38	Groove	Li Zhiwei	99
18	Groove	Jang Kyungho	169	39	Beat	Jiang Fan	97
19	Beat	Yuito	166	40	Beat	Kim Dongyun	81
20	Beat	Nam Doyoon	163	41	Beat	Kang Junhyuk	75
21	Beat	Koo Hanseo	159	42	Beat	Park Jihun	62

=== Round 2 ===
Player rankings are based on votes from the first voting period (Nov 11–17, 2024) before the show aired. As before, three players from the 2nd place team and six from the 3rd receive Yellow Cards. A second Yellow Card in this mission results in immediate elimination, regardless of ranking.

Key:

-	Yellow Card (1)
-	Yellow Card (2)

Rank	Team	Name	Votes	Rank	Team	Name	Votes
1	Beat	Cha Woongki	41,870	22	Rhythm	Ayumu	7,189
2	Rhythm	JL	38,057	23	Rhythm	Mac	7,141
3	Rhythm	Zhang Shuaibo	25,662	24	Rhythm	Hiroto	6,699
4	Rhythm	Steven	24,199	25	Groove	Kim Gijoong	6,292
5	Rhythm	Chih En	22,663	26	Rhythm	Sirin	6,030
6	Groove	Kenta	19,423	27	Beat	Yuito	6,027
7	Groove	Jang Kyungho	15,502	28	Groove	Bae Jaeho	5,747
8	Groove	Seo Jeongwoo	14,179	29	Groove	Kim Daeyun	5,357
9	Rhythm	Park Juwon	13,426	30	Beat	Kim Hyotae	5,260
10	Rhythm	Eito	12,364	31	Beat	Nam Doyoon	5,158
11	Rhythm	Daisuke	12,062	32	Beat	Anyul	5,148
12	Groove	Kwon Heejun	11,717	33	Groove	Zen Zen	5,027
13	Groove	Kim Joohyoung	11,660	34	Groove	Yeo Gangdong	5,001
14	Beat	Kim Dongyun	11,227	35	Beat	Royce	4,472
15	Groove	Park Han	11,127	36	Beat	Jiang Fan	4,191
16	Groove	He Junjin	10,312	37	Beat	Li Zhiwei	4,134
17	Beat	Keum Jinho	9, 746	38	Rhythm	Xie Yuxin	4,048
18	Beat	Kairi	9,111	39	Beat	Park Jihun	3,872
19	Rhythm	Li Zhinuo	7,683	40	Rhythm	Jin Ziming	3,691
20	Groove	Koo Hanseo	7,568	41	Beat	Kang Junhyuk	3,526
21	Groove	James	7,491	42	Beat	Park Yeonjun	2,668

=== Round 3 ===
Player rankings are based on votes from the second voting period (Nov 22–Dec 21, 2024) and on-site votes from Round 3 performances. As before, three players from the 2nd place team and six from the 3rd receive Yellow Cards. A second Yellow Card in this mission results in immediate elimination, regardless of ranking.

Key:

-	Yellow Card (1)
-	Yellow Card (2)

Rank	Team	Name	Votes				Rank	Team	Name	Votes			
Rank	Team	Name	On-Site (Note: Maximum of 400 votes per performance)		Online	Total	Rank	Team	Name	On-Site		Online	Total
Rank	Team	Name	Unit 1	Unit 2	Online	Total	Rank	Team	Name	Unit 1	Unit 2	Online	Total
1	Rhythm	JL	231	224	462,150	462,605	22	Groove	He Junjin	186	0	48,613	48,799
2	Beat	Cha Woongki	270	250	264,699	265,219	23	Beat	Keum Jinho	231	256	42,483	42,970
3	Rhythm	Steven	230	226	248,222	248,678	24	Groove	Kim Daeyun	0	0	40,433	40,433
4	Groove	Park Han	244	273	219,567	220,084	25	Rhythm	Zen Zen	0	184	38,691	38,875
5	Rhythm	Zhang Shuaibo	238	204	195,664	196,106	26	Rhythm	Li Zhinuo	0	186	38,500	38,686
6	Rhythm	Chih En	281	258	190,429	190,968	27	Beat	Yuito	171	204	33,096	33,471
7	Groove	Park Juwon	257	0	172,010	172,267	28	Rhythm	Ayumu	146	0	32,946	33,092
8	Groove	Seo Jeongwoo	0	291	127,380	127,671	29	Beat	Anyul	230	252	32,418	32,900
9	Groove	Kenta	301	259	121,908	122,468	30	Rhythm	Hiroto	0	0	29,171	29,171
10	Groove	Kim Joohyoung	0		120,315	120,315	31	Groove	Bae Jaeho	0	194	28,371	28,565
11	Rhythm	Daisuke	240	203	106,828	107,271	32	Groove	Yeo Gangdong	254	0	28,232	28,486
12	Groove	Jang Kyungho	0	199	93,978	94,177	33	Beat	Nam Doyoon	203	240	24,876	25,319
13	Groove	Kwon Heejun	262	0	90,661	90,923	34	Beat	Kim Hyotae	158	191	20,190	20,539
14	Groove	Sirin	0	184	75,895	76,079	35	Rhythm	Xie Yuxin	185	0	19,721	19,906
15	Groove	Koo Hanseo	207	0	75,308	75,515	36	Beat	Li Zhiwei	0	0	19,767	19,767
16	Rhythm	Kim Dongyun	0	0	74,455	74,455	37	Beat	Jin Ziming	0	0	17,996	17,996
17	Beat	Kairi	276	272	64,896	65,444							
18	Groove	Kim Gijoong	0	251	54,756	55,007							
19	Rhythm	Eito	0	0	52,969	52,969							
20	Rhythm	Mac	0	0	50,463	50,463							
21	Rhythm	James	0	0	49,725	49,725							

=== Final round ===
The team with the highest combined score from the final voting period (Jan 18-24, 2025) and the final live voting period (during the episode airing) will claim the prestigious Prism Cup for their team, securing debut for all seven members. On top of the selected team, an additional two members would be added to the debut lineup. The player with the most votes from each of the other teams would also join the debut group. The team would become a nine-member group, aptly named AHOF (All-time Hall of Famer).

Color Key:

Debuting Contestant

Rank	Team	Name	Votes Received
1	Rhythm	JL	3,168,841
2	Rhythm	Steven	313,965
3	Rhythm	Zhang Shuaibo	245,615
4	Rhythm	Park Juwon	225,105
5	Rhythm	Seo Jeongwoo	173,779
6	Rhythm	Chih En	146,731
7	Rhythm	Daisuke	104,925
8	Groove	Park Han	504,261
9	Beat	Cha Woongki	677,202
10	Groove	Jang Kyungho	165,093
11	Groove	Kim Joohyoung	147,636
12	Groove	Kwon Heejun	122,876
13	Groove	Kenta	119,316
14	Groove	Koo Hanseo	103,821
15	Groove	Kim Gijoong	76,190
16	Beat	Kairi	111,512
17	Beat	Sirin	57,198
18	Beat	Yuito	38,346
19	Beat	Keum Jinho	32,009
20	Beat	Kim Dongyun	25,080
21	Beat	Zen Zen	24,523

== Discography ==
The theme song "We Ready" was recorded and performed by the contestants. It was released on November 1, 2024, on digital music platforms.

=== Singles ===
List of singles, showing year released, and name of the album
Title	Year	Album
"We Ready"	2024	Universe League – We Ready
"Ignition"	2024	Universe League – Intercept
"Prison"	2024	Universe League – Intercept
"Mamma Mia (Who We Are)"	2024	Universe League – Intercept
"Don't Hit The Brakes"	2025	Universe League – Seven
"Roller Coaster"	2025	Universe League – Seven
"Only U" (나는 너야)	2025	Universe League – Seven
"Butterfly"	2025	Universe League – Seven
"My, My, My"	2025	Universe League – Seven
"On&On"	2025	Universe League – Seven
"@Tag"	2025	Universe League – W.A.R. (We Are Ready)
"La Fiesta"	2025	Universe League – W.A.R. (We Are Ready)
"Anywhere, I'll Be With You"	2025	Universe League – W.A.R. (We Are Ready)
"Universe"	2025	Universe League – W.A.R. (We Are Ready)
"Dreaming"	2025	Universe League – W.A.R. (We Are Ready)
"Sunset in the Sky"	2025	Universe League – W.A.R. (We Are Ready)

== Reception ==
=== Viewership ratings ===
According to Nielsen Korea, Universe League recorded an average nationwide audience share of 0.5% during its run from November 2024 to January 2025. The program's highest-rated episode reached 0.7%, while the lowest fell to 0.2%. The final episode, which aired in January 24, recorded a rating of 0.5%. The program drew limited domestic viewership during its run.

=== Business impact ===
The program was produced by F&F Entertainment in partnership with Prism Studios and SBS, as part of the company's strategy to expand into the K-pop industry. According to a company representative, the combined production cost of Universe League and Universe Ticket was approximately ₩20 billion. They stated that high initial costs were expected due to the company's early stage of development, and that profitability would likely follow if the groups gained sufficient popularity. The company projected a shift to a profitable model within a typical three-year investment timeline.

A market analyst expressed concern about F&F Entertainment's ability to manage the financial demands of idol group production, citing the volatility of the entertainment industry and the dominance of established agencies such as HYBE, SM, YG, and JYP. In this context, the relatively low ratings of University League have raised questions about the company's growth strategy. However, others in the industry noted that survival program ratings do not necessarily determine the long-term success of the groups they produce. Industry comparisons have been drawn to Zerobaseone and Enhypen, both of which debuted through low-rated programs and later achieved notable commercial success, especially overseas.

== Post-Competition ==
The final group, AHOF (All-time Hall of Famer) is managed by F&F Entertainment and will promote for at least four years, with discussions permitting an extension to seven years. The group debuted on July 1, 2025, with the extended play (EP) Who We Are.

Other contestants, other activities
- Some contestants returned to their original groups:
  - Kim Joohyoung (11th) returned to NINE.i.
    - He left the group on March 11, 2025.
  - Royce (38th) returned to Youtove.
- Some contestants left their companies or joined new ones:
  - Jang Kyungho (10th), Koo Hanseo (15th), and Keum Jinho, who left Eighty6, (19th) all joined PI Corporation.
    - At some point in 2026, Koo Hanseo left PI Corporation and joined MakitStudio
  - Kim Joohyoung (11th) left FirstOne Entertainment joined ODDWAVE.
  - Kairi (14th) joined independent label ALRIGHT.
  - Kim Gijoong (16th) left PocketDol Studio and joined KH Company.
  - Zen Zen (21st) and Ayumu (25th) both left Bill Entertainment.
    - Zen Zen, alongside Sirin (17th) both joined Nouer Entertainment.
  - Bae Jaeho (28th) left Woollim Entertainment.
  - James (30th) joined Xebis Entertainment.
  - Yeo Gangdong (33rd) joined Japanese agency imaginate.
  - Kim Hyo-tae (35th) joined FC Entertainment.
  - Jiang Fan (39th) joined WindLink Entertainment.
- Some contestants will debut or debuted in new boy groups or released music as solo artists:
  - Kim Joohyoung (11th) debuted as a member of ODDWAVE's new boy group, Daily:Direction with their first single album First:Delivery with the title track 'ROOMBADOOMBA' on February 23, 2026.
  - Kairi (14th) was confirmed to be a member of independent label ALRIGHT's new Japanese boy group, TAGRIGHT on December 28, 2025. They released their first pre-debut digital single FOREVER BLUE on January 7, 2026, and are set to release their debut single on July 15, 2026.
  - Koo Hanseo (15th) is set to debut in MakitStudio's boy group TRYTHAT sometime in 2026. They released their pre-debut song Frequency on August 18, 2026.
  - Yuito (18th), with other members under SME Japan, debuted as a member of Japanese boy group trio, Bestted with their first single CLIPPING!!! on November 19, 2025.
  - Anyul (29th), who already debuted as a child soloist prior to the airing of the show, released his first digital single Heart On Fire on April 2, 2025.
  - James (30th), under the stage name Jamier, debuted as a member of Xebis Entertainment's new Thai co-ed group, Alters with the digital single Giggle Wiggle on December 12, 2025.
  - Yeo Gangdong (33rd), under the stage name Kandon, is a member of imaginate's new Japanese boy group, FUNxFUN.
  - Kim Hyotae (35th) was confirmed to be a member of FC Entertainment's predebut boy group, ADAP on November 5, 2025. They are slated to debut in the second half of 2026.
  - Jiang Fan (39th) debuted as a member of WindLink Entertainment's new Chinese boy group, WINDMAX with their first digital single Best.1 on March 8, 2026, following the pre-release 'Feel The Wind'.
  - Park Yeon-jun (42nd) is set to debut as a member of Macaroni Music Entertainment's new upcoming boy group , AGD sometime in the second half of 2026.
- Some contestants participated in other survival shows:
  - Eito (23rd), and Hiroto (34th) both participated in Lemino's Japanese survival show Produce 101 Japan Shinsekai. They were both eliminated in the fifth episode, after ranking 57th and 76th respecively.
  - Xie Yuxin (24th), He Junjin (32nd), and Jiang Fan (39th) were contestants on Mnet's Korean survival show Boys II Planet. Xie Yuxin and He Junjin were both eliminated in the second episode after ranking 108th and 87th respectively, and Jiang Fan was eliminated in the fifth episode after ranking 63rd.
  - Li Zhiwei (36th) was a contestant on SBS's Korean survival show B:My Boys. He was eliminated in the tenth episode, after ranking 19th.
