= Who We Are (AHOF EP) =

EP by AHOF
- Released: July 1, 2025
- Recorded: 2025
- Length: 17:19
- Language: Korean
- Labels: F&F

AHOF chronology
Who We Are (2025)	The Passage (2025)

Singles from Who We Are
- 1. "Rendezvous" Released: July 1, 2025

Who We Are is the debut extended play by South Korean boy band AHOF, released on July 1, 2025, by F&F Entertainment and distributed by Kakao Entertainment. The EP features six tracks that follow a progression from individual uncertainty and unshared emotions to collective growth and cohesion. Its lead single, "Rendezvous", features a pop rock-style arrangement with guitar and drum-driven, dream-like production. All tracks were produced under the direction of El Capitxn, a former mentor on Universe League, the survival show that formed the group.

== Background and release ==
Following the conclusion of Universe League, which led to the formation of AHOF as the debut group, F&F Entertainment announced on February 5, 2025 that the group was preparing to release their first extended play. While initial reports indicated a debut in the first half of 2025, the agency later confirmed a July 2025 release date. Then on June 17, the agency unveiled the title of the EP, Who We Are, along with a promotional schedule that included concept photos, track previews, and music video teasers. Pre-orders also opened on the same day, with physical copies released in multiple formats, including a photobook version, ten types of jewel case versions, and a QR version. Each format featured distinct packaging featuring distinct artwork and inclusions such as photocards and other collectibles.

On June 23, a short music video for the EP's intro track, "The Little Star", was released through the group's official social media platforms. In the video, the members are portrayed as nine stars shining separately before coming together and facing the same direction, symbolizing their unification as a group. The track serves as a preview of the EP's opening concept and references the nursery rhyme "Twinkle, Twinkle, Little Star". In the final days leading up to the album's release, two teasers for the lead single were unveiled on June 30, offering brief previews of the song's sound and visual concept through AHOF's official channels. The EP was officially released on July 1, in both digital and physical formats, under F&F Entertainment via Kakao Entertainment. It features a total of six tracks, including the lead single "Rendezvous", which was promoted as a pop-rock song highlighting guitar and drum instrumentation with a dream-like arrangement.

== Composition ==
Who We Are consists of six tracks that explore themes of uncertainty and personal growth, following a narrative in which individuals confront their unresolved emotions and gradually move toward unity. The EP was produced under the direction of El Capitxn, who previously served as a mentor on Universe League. The entire album is positioned as a prologue to AHOF's musical identity, with all six tracks arranged to form a continuous thematic arc.

The EP opens with "The Little Star", a track that pays homage to "Twinkle, Twinkle, Little Star" and features a vintage-textured piano accompaniment. It has been described as evoking the image of a "trembling boy who has fallen on stage". The third track and lead single, "Rendezvous", adopts a pop-rock arrangement, featuring layered guitar and drum instrumentation. Its dream-like production supports lyrics that reflect on anxiety, nostalgia, and emotional longing tied to the pursuit of a dream, with member Cha Woong-ki credited as one of the lyricists. The EP continues with "The Universe" and "Cosmic Underdog", two tracks that draw on the group's experience in the Universe League. The former is a bright, upbeat track that uses primary colors to symbolize unity through difference, while the latter is synth-based and conveys themes of competition and sincerity. Both songs address the challenges of growth and self-doubt. "Incompleted" follows with a mid-tempo R&B and acoustic style, using lyrics that reflect on how connection can foster a sense of completeness. The final track, "AHOF", is a spoken-word piece in which the members articulate messages of hope and introspection, reinforcing the album's overarching themes.

== Promotion ==
AHOF held their debut showcase at the Yes24 Live Hall in Gwangjin District, Seoul. During the event, the group performed tracks from Who We Are, including "Rendezvous", for the public and press. The showcase was also streamed live through AHOF's official YouTube channel. Then, from July 2 to 6, a pop-up store was held at the Atrium A of Times Square Mall in Yeongdeungpo District as part of debut promotions. The space featured official merchandise, themed photo zones, and a lucky draw event for fans. The members made an appearance on operning day, surprising fans in attendance.

Promotional activities continued with their first televised performance on M Countdown on July 3, followed by appearances on Music Bank and Inkigayo. AHOF also participated in performance-focused content such as Studio Choom Original and Relay Dance series, which highlighted the group's choreography for "Rendezvous". They also appeared on Gag Concert, where they performed the lead single and participated in a comedy skit segment. On July 26, the group performed at 2025 SBS Gayo Daejeon Summer Festival, making them one of the few K-pop acts invited to the event prior to their official debut, which is a rare occurrence for debuting groups. They presented a re-arranged version of their lead single, replacing the bridge with dance break.

In addition to broadcast and digital content appearances, AHOF expanded their promotional activities overseas. On July 27, they held an autograph session in Guangzhou, marking their first fan event outside South Korea. In August, the group is scheduled to hold mini live performances and talk sessions in Japan–first in Osaka on August 2, followed by Tokyo on August 9. Attendance will be determined by lottery among purchasers of the Who We Are QR version through WayK Shop, the group's designated sales platform in Japan. AHOF is also set to hold a fan concert at the Araneta Coliseum in Quezon City on August 30, their first large-scale solo event in the Philippines.

=== Music videos ===
The music video for the title track "Rendezvous" premiered on July 1, simultaneously with the EP release. Described by Star News reporter Lee Seung-hoon as visually subdued, the video mirrors the song's arrangement by gradually building in emotion and intensity, with scenes focusing on the members' expressions and movements to convey their individual struggles and eventual sense of unity. The music video surpassed 26.85 million views within its first week, currently the highest for any boy group debuting in 2025.

The second music video for the track "The Universe" was released on July 29. Although not formally promoted as a single, the track received its own video, highlighting its conceptual connection to the group's survival program Universe League. Set in school-themed locations such as classrooms and athletic fields, the video emphasizes AHOF's bright image and group dynamic. Through playful scenes and synchronized choreography, it symbolically references the group's shared journey during the survival program.

== Commercial performance ==
Who We Are sold 369,850 copies in its first week, from July 1 to 7, making it the best-selling debut release by a K-pop boy group in 2025. It also ranked fifth overall in first-week sales among all boy group debuts in South Korea, as of July 2025.

== Track listing ==
Who We Are track listing
No.	Title	Lyrics	Music	Arrangement	Length
1.	"The Little Star" (소년, 무대 위로 넘어지다 (Intro))	Kelsi (Vendors); Kwon Si-ha; Yikyung (Wavecloud); Bodega Cat (Vendors)	El Capitxn; Arte (Vendors); Abim (Vendors); Didrik Thott; Robby Jay; Collin (Vendors)	El Capitxn; Arte; Abim	3:11
2.	"The Universe" (파랑 학교, 초록 잔디, 빨간 운동화)	Kelsi; Kwon S.; Bodega Cat	El Capitxn; Andy Love; Louis (Vendors); Nara (Vendors); Collin; Chiller (Vendors)	El Capitxn; Louis; Nara	3:15
3.	"Rendezvous" (그곳에서 다시 만나기로 해)	El Capitxn; Collin; Bel (Vendors); Cha Woong-ki; Kelsi; Doyeon (Wavecloud); Yikyung; Chiller; Owl (Vendors)	El Capitxn; Zenur (Vendors); Louis; Kwon; Rence; Alex Schwoebel; Lukas Costas; Bel; Ninos Hanna; Ebenezer	El Capitxn; Zenur; Louis	3:40
4.	"Incompleted" (미완성은 아닐거야)	El Capitxn; Collin; Tood (Vendors); Seorin (Vendors); Doyeon; Bodega Cat	El Capitxn; Louis; Nara; Rence; Costas; Kwon; Schwoebel; G06 Beatz; Cube	El Capitxn; Louis; Nara; G06 Beatz; Cube	2:51
5.	"Cosmic Underdog" (우주 최고의 꼴찌)	Nason (Vendors); Kelsi; Kwon S.; Doyeon; Seorin; Chiller	El Capitxn; Nason; Arte; Revin	El Capitxn; Arte; Revin	3:13
6.	"AHOF" (아홉, 우리가 빛나는 숫자 (Outro))	Kelsi; Kwon S.	El Capitxn; Zenur	El Capitxn; Zenur	1:09
Total length:					17:19

== Charts ==
=== Weekly charts ===
Weekly chart performance for Who We Are
Chart (2025)	Peak position
South Korean Albums (Circle)	3

=== Monthly charts ===
Monthly chart performance for Who We Are
Chart (2025)	Position
South Korean Albums (Circle)	8

== Release history ==
Region	Date	Format	Label
South Korea	July 1, 2025	CD	F&F
Various	July 1, 2025	Digital download; streaming	F&F
