= Luminous (group) =

South Korean boy band (2021–2025)

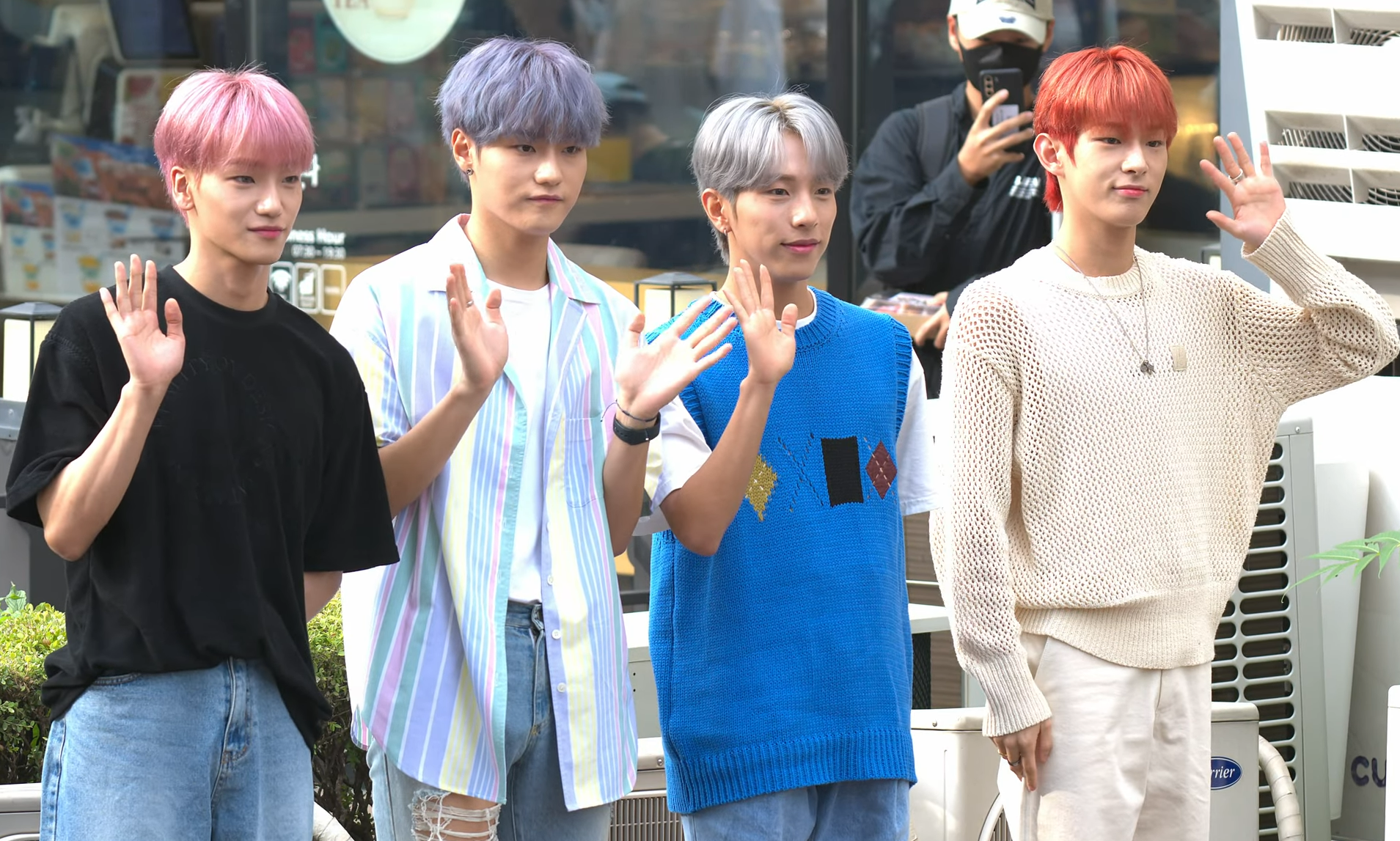
- Luminous in August 2022; L–R: Youngbin, Woobin, Suil, and Steven.

Background information
- Origin: Seoul, South Korea
- Genres: K-pop; hip hop; R&B
- Years active: 2021–2025
- Labels: SE Group; EVA
- Past members: Youngbin; Suil; Steven; Woobin

Luminous (Korean: 루미너스, stylized in all caps) was a South Korean Korean boy band formed and managed by SE Group Entertainment (formerly Barunson WIP). The group consisted of four members: Youngbin, Suil, Steven, and Woobin. They debuted on September 9, 2021, with the extended play (EP) Youth and disbanded on February 9, 2025.

== History ==
Luminous was originally set to begin releasing music with a different name and company in 2019, but the group's debut was delayed. Vocal trainer Kim Sung-eun, who had previously worked with numerous artists including BTS and Twice, founded the music agency Barunson WIP and took in the ensemble with members Youngbin, Suil, Steven, and Woobin. The name of the group was decided by vote and given the meaning of "a light shining brightly even in the dark". A fictional universe was introduced as part of Luminous's concept and the members symbolize the elements of thunder (Suil), fire (Steven), light (Youngbin), and moonlight (Woobin).

On August 17, 2021, Barunson WIP announced its plans to debut the four-member group produced by Kim and Barunson E&A, with its debut album slated to be issued in early September. Luminous released a surprise pre-debut EP entitled Vision and its lead single "Dreaming Luminous" two days later. The EP also included solo songs composed by each member. Luminous' debut EP Youth was scheduled to be released on September 1, but was postponed following Youngbin's COVID-19 diagnosis. It was released along with the lead single "Run" on September 9. The quartet made its first live performance on SBS M's music chart program The Show on September 14. Luminous held a mini fan concert on October 4 called Youth: You and I. A music video for the album track "Home Alone" was released later that month.

Luminous released its second EP Between Light and Darkness (Self n Ego) and its lead single "All Eyes Down (Advance)" on January 20, 2022. Inspired by the fictional supervillain Joker, the EP delves into the "confusion between the real self and the created self" as the lyrics try to determine, "Who am I?". Announced one day prior, the group made the mid-tempo pop song "Wish You Were Here" available on online music platforms on May 21. Luminous released their first studio album Luminous in Wonderland and its two singles "Engine" and "Creature" on August 17. The group disbanded on February 9, 2025.

== Musical style ==
Luminous's lyrical theme revolves around youth. The group aims to "convey a message of hope and comfort" to that audience through the songs lyrics. Upon its debut, Luminous laid its music foundation in hip hop integrated with R&B and pop. Luminous's first few singles comprised a dark atmosphere, but the group's music shifted to a "clear, bright" direction with "Engine".

== Members ==
- Youngbin – leader, vocal, dance
- Suil – vocal, rap, dance
- Steven – vocal, rap
- Woobin – vocal

== Discography ==
=== Studio albums ===
List of studio albums, showing selected details, selected chart positions, and sales figures
Title	Details	Peak chart positions	Sales
Title	Details	KOR	Sales
Luminous in Wonderland	Released: August 17, 2022; Label: SE Group, Danal; Format: CD, digital download; Track listing: 1. "Marionette"; 2. "Creature"; 3. "Engine"; 4. "Your Ocean"; 5. "Crazy" (열대야); 6. "Far"; 7. "Hologram"; 8. "Upside Down"; 9. "Talking Myself"; 10. "Legend"	75	KOR: 1,354

==== Extended plays ====
List of extended plays, showing selected details, selected chart positions, and sales figures
Title	Details	Peak chart positions
Title	Details	KOR
Vision	Released: August 19, 2021; Label: Barunson WIP, Kakao; Format: Digital download; Track listing: 1. "Dreaming Luminous" (끔루 (꿈을 꾸는 루미너스)); 2. "ROD (Ride Or Die)"; 3. "Up All Night"; 4. "Star" (별); 5. "Orbit" (여행)	—
Youth	Released: September 9, 2021; Label: Barunson WIP, Kakao; Format: CD, digital download; Track listing: 1. "Intro"; 2. "Run"; 3. "Home Alone"; 4. "Run (abbr. Inst.)"; 5. "Home Alone (Inst.)"	—
Between Light and Darkness (Self n Ego)	Released: January 20, 2022; Label: Barunson WIP, Kakao; Format: Digital download; Track listing: 1. "Matryoshka"; 2. "Trouble"; 3. "All Eyes Down" (비상); 4. "Blind" (섬광증); 5. "Want It More?"	96
"—" denotes a recording that did not chart or was not released in that territory

=== Singles ===
List of singles, showing year released, and name of the album
Title	Year	Album
"Dreaming Luminous" (꿈루 (꿈을 꾸는 루미너스))	2021	Vision
"Run"	2021	Youth
"All Eyes Down (Advance)" (비상)	2022	Between Light and Darkness (Self n Ego)
"Wish You Were Here"	2022	Non-album single
"Engine"	2022	Luminous in Wonderland
"Creature"	2022	Luminous in Wonderland

== Concerts ==
- Youth: You and I (2021)
