= Pluus =

Filipino boy band

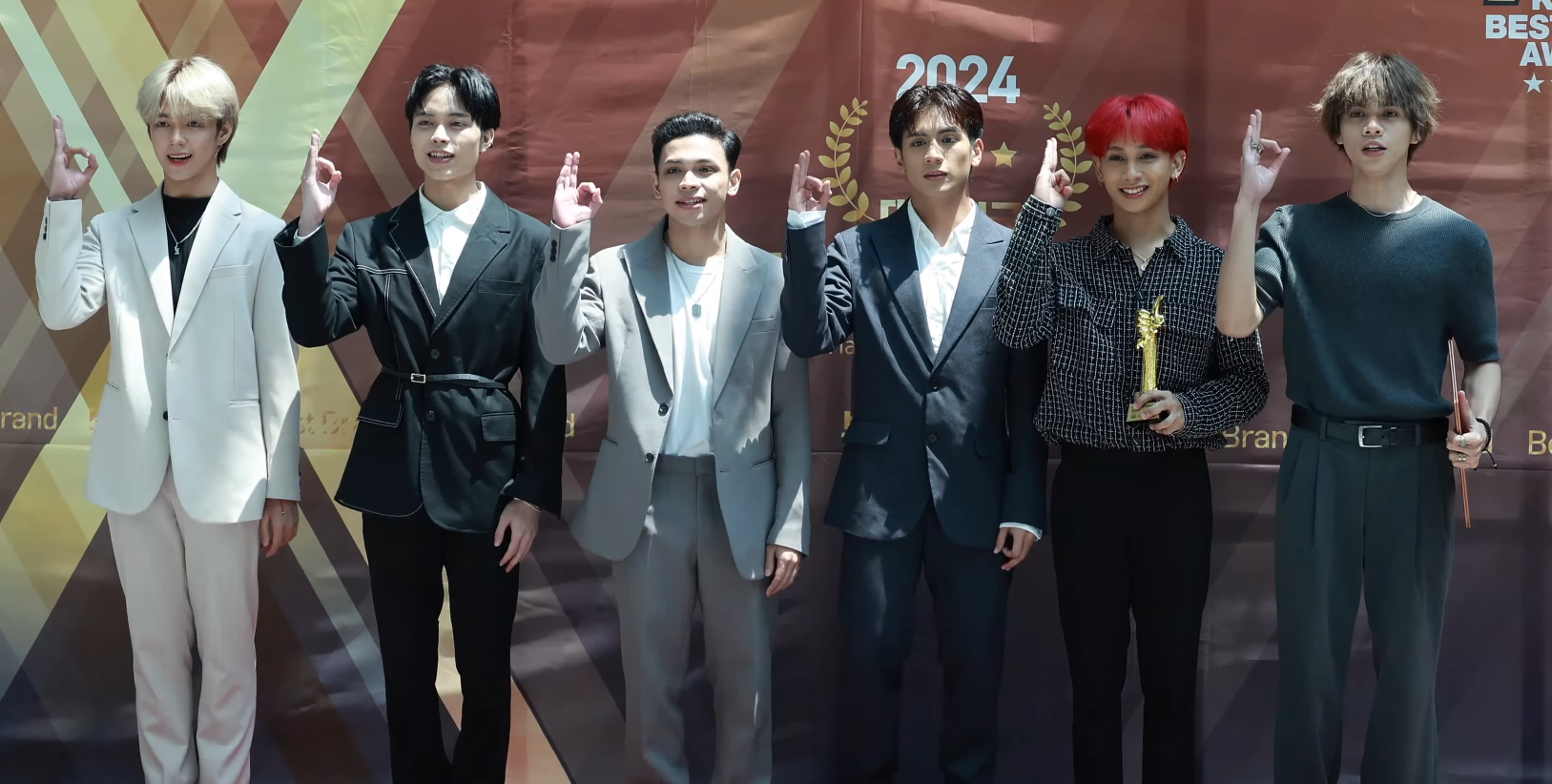
- PLUUS in 2024

Background information
- Origin: Manila, Philippines
- Genres: P-pop
- Years active: 2023–present
- Labels: SBTown; Universal Philippines
- Members: Theo; Gab; Justin; Yen; Haro; JL

Pluus (pronounced "plus"; stylized in all caps) is a Filipino boy band under SBTown. The group currently consists of Theo, Gab, Justin, Yen, Haro and JL. The group debuted on March 31, 2023, with the release of their debut mini album Pluus +.Y.M featuring three singles: "Amigo"," "My Time"," and "Cross My Heart".

== Name ==
The name of the group came from the combination of the words "plus" and "us" which means that PLUUS and its fandom are together in this journey from the start and will continue to stick together for a long time and that the boys will be here to add good things in their life. Their official greeting is “Always… Plus Us! We are Pluus!”

== Members ==
The group consists of six members. Pluus lacks predetermined positions, with the role of leader being placed in rotation among members.

=== Current members ===
- Theo
- Gab
- Justin
- Yen
- Haro
- JL

== Filmography ==
=== Television shows ===
Year	Program	Network	Ref.
2023	TiktoClock	GMA	
2023	Unang Hirit	GMA	
2023	All-Out Sundays	GMA	
2023	ASAP	ABS-CBN	
2023	All-Out Sundays	GMA	
2023	It's Showtime	ABS-CBN	
2023	I Can See Your Voice	ABS-CBN	
2023	CNN Philippines	CNN	
2023	ASAP	ABS-CBN	
2024-2025	Universe League (JL only)	SBS	

== Discography ==
=== Mini album ===
Title	Album Details
PLUUS +.Y.M.	Released: March 31, 2023 (PH); Label: Universal Records; Format: CD, digital download, streaming; Track listing: 1. "Amigo"; 2. "My Time"; 3. "Cross My Heart"

=== Singles ===
Title	Year	Album	Ref.
"Amigo"	2023	PLUUS +.Y.M.	
"My Time"	2023	PLUUS +.Y.M.	
"Cross My Heart"	2023	PLUUS +.Y.M.	
"Missing You"	2023	Non-Album Single	
"Shining Star"	2023	Non-Album Single	
"Universe"	2024		
"Summotion"	2024		
Collaboration
"Maligaya Ang Pasko" (YGIG)	2023	Non-Album Single	

== Videography ==
=== Music videos ===
List of music videos, showing year released, and directors
Title	Year	Director(s)	Length	Ref.
"Amigo"	2023	Geong Seong Han	3:50	
"My Time"	2023	Toothless Multimedia Production	4:11	
"Cross My Heart"	2023	Geong Seong Han	3:45	
"Missing You"	2023	Yang Woong Jin; Kim Jeong Youp	4:31	
"Shining Star"	2023	Geong Seong Han	5:25	
"Maligaya Ang Pasko"	2023	Marc Dabatian, Geong Seong Han	3:47	

== Concerts and live performances ==
Showcases
Year	Date	Event name	Venue	Location	Ref.
2023	March 31	PLUUS +ime is Now	Power Mac Center Spotlight	Circuit Makati	

Concert Participation
Event name	Dates	Venue	Location	Ref.
Manila K-Town Water Concert!	April 30, 2023	Remedios Circle	Malate, Manila	

=== Fan meetings ===
Event name	Dates	Venue	Location	Ref.
SUMmer PLUUStival	May 13, 2023	SM North Edsa Sky Dome	Quezon City	

=== Mall shows ===
Event	Dates	Venue	Location	Ref.
WEGO SUM-All Tour	April 29, 2023	Festival Alabang	Alabang, Muntinlupa	
WEGO SUM-All Tour	May 28, 2023	Robinsons Imus	Imus, Cavite	
WEGO SUM-All Tour	June 3, 2023	Ayala Malls Centrio	Cagayan de Oro	
WEGO SUM-All Tour	June 10, 2023	Robinsons Dasmariñas	Dasmariñas, Cavite	
WEGO SUM-All Tour	June 11, 2023	Robinsons Galleria South	San Pedro, Laguna	
WEGO SUM-All Tour	June 17, 2023	Robinsons Sta. Rosa	Santa Rosa, Laguna	
WEGO SUM-All Tour	June 24, 2023	SM City Cebu	Cebu	
WEGO SUM-All Tour	June 18, 2023	Robinsons Las Piñas	Las Piñas, Metro Manila	
WEGO SUM-All Tour	July 1, 2023	Robinsons General Trias	General Trias, Cavite	
WEGO SUM-All Tour	July 9, 2023	Robinsons Lipa	Batangas	
WEGO SUM-All Tour	August 13, 2023	Fisher Mall Malabon	Malabon	
WEGO SUM-All Tour	August 20, 2023	Fisher Mall Quezon Avenue	Quezon City	
WEGO SUM-All Tour	October 14, 2023	SM City Olongapo Central	Olongapo	
WEGO SUM-All Tour	November 18, 2023	Robinsons Antipolo	Antipolo	
WEGO SUM-All Tour	November 19, 2023	SM City Pampanga	Pampanga	

== Awards and nominations ==
Name of the award ceremony, year presented, category, nominee of the award, and the result of the nomination
Award ceremony	Year	Category	Nominee / Work	Result	Ref.
Awit Award	2023	Favorite Group Artist	PLUUS	Nominated	
Rawr Award	2023	favorite group	PLUUS	Nominated	
Ppop Awards	2023	New boy group of the year	PLUUS	Nominated	
Ppop Awards	2023	Top Rising Group of the Year	PLUUS	Won	
