= TO1 =

South Korean boy band

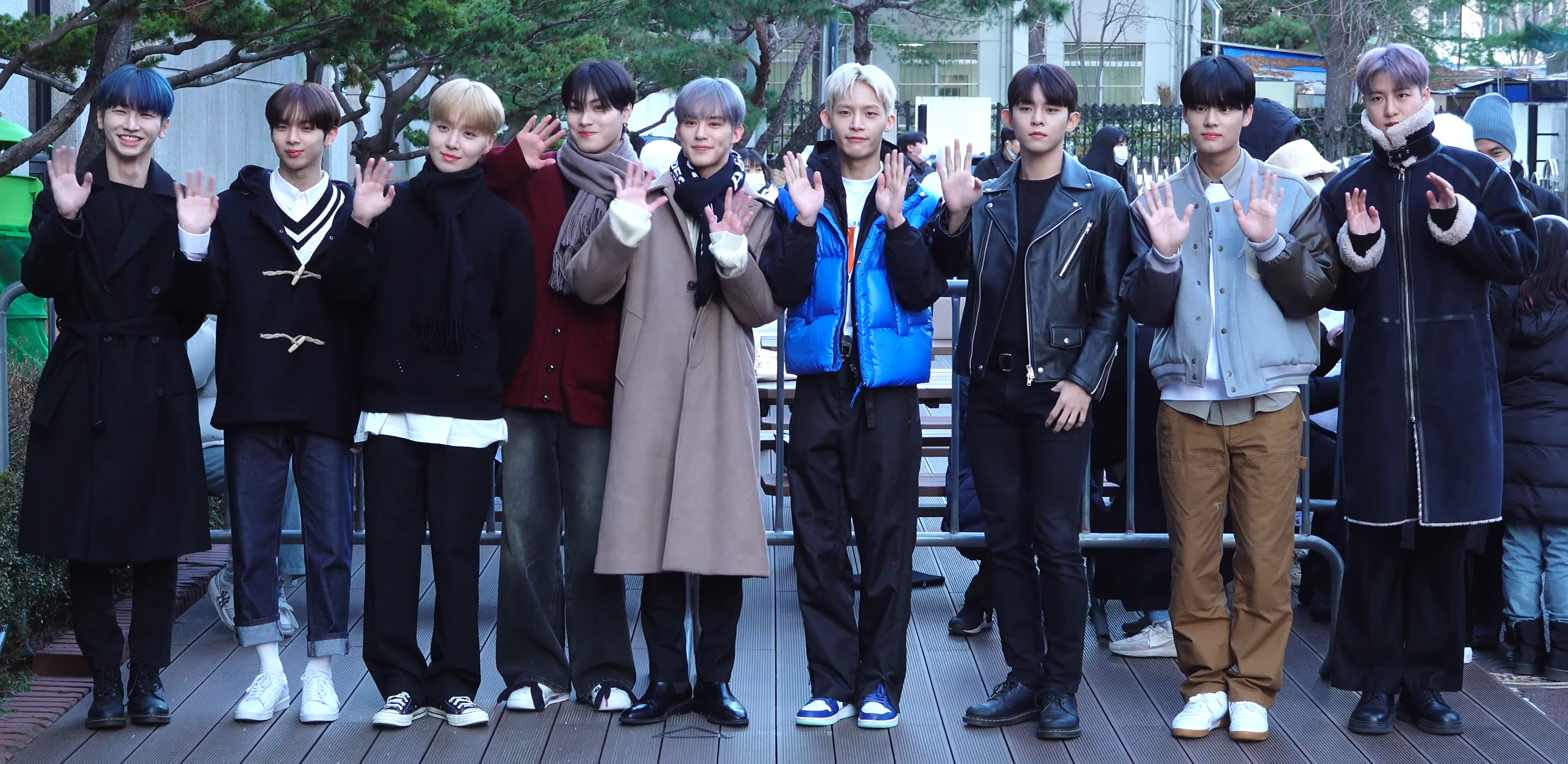
- TO1 in December 2022; From left to right: Jisu, Daigo, Jaeyun, Renta, J.You, Chan, Donggeon, Yeojeong, Kyungho

Background information
- Also known as: TOO (2020–2021)
- Origin: Seoul, South Korea
- Genres: K-pop; Hip hop; R&B
- Years active: 2020–2023
- Label: WakeOne
- Past members: Chihoon; Donggeon; Chan; Jisu; Minsu; Jaeyun; J.You; Kyungho; Jerome; Daigo; Woonggi; Renta; Yeojeong
- Website: Official website

TO1 (Korean: 티오원; formerly known as TOO (Note: Short for "Ten Oriented Orchestra")) (stylized in all caps) was a South Korean boy band formed by Mnet's 2019 reality show To Be World Klass. The group debuted on April 1, 2020, with their first mini album Reason For Being: Benevolence with "Magnolia" serving as the title track.

== History ==
=== 2020: Debut and Road to Kingdom ===
On March 20, it was announced that the group will join Mnet's reality television competition Road to Kingdom. They were the second group eliminated in the seventh episode.

The group debuted with their first mini album Reason For Being: Benevolence on April 1, with the title track "Magnolia".

On July 15, the group released their second mini album Running TOOgether, with the title track "Count 1, 2."

On August 13, at the 2020 Soribada Awards, TOO won the "New Artist Award", their first rookie award since debut.

=== 2021: Reformation, Re:Born, and Re:Alize ===
On January 13, CJ ENM and n.CH Entertainment were involved in management disputes, where CJ ENM reportedly terminated their management contract with n.CH Entertainment. One day later, n.CH Entertainment responded to the disputes by stating that their contract was not formally signed for months, and that no expenses were paid since August 2020.

It was announced on March 28 that the group had changed its name from TOO to TO1.

TO1 made their re-debut with their first EP Re:Born on May 20, with the title track "Son of Beast". The group will be managed under CJ ENM's music label, WakeOne.

On November 4, TO1 released their second EP Re:Alize, with the title track "No More X".

On December 28, Wake One announced that Woonggi would be taking a break from the group due to an anxiety disorder, and thus TO1 would temporarily continue with the remaining nine members.

=== 2022–2023: Line-up changes, Why Not??, UP2U, Renta's departure and departure from WakeOne ===
On April 30, WakeOne released an official statement via TO1's fan cafe, announcing member Chihoon's departure from the group. On June 17, Wake One announced members Minsu, Jerome, and Woonggi's departure from TO1. They also announced that Daigo, Renta, and Yeojeong will be joining TO1 as new members. Renta and Daigo participated in Produce 101 Japan Season 2, placing 13th and 16th respectively.

On July 28, TO1 released their third EP Why Not??, with the title track "Drummin'".

On August 21, Chan wore a durag during KCON Los Angeles which caused controversy.

On November 23, TO1 released their fourth EP UP2U, with the title track "Freeze Tag'".

On September 22, 2023, Renta announced through an Instagram post containing a letter in both Korean and Japanese that he would be leaving the group.

On December 17, 2023, it was announced through a Fancafé post that the group's contract with WakeOne would be terminated officially on December 31, 2023.

== Members ==
Final line-up

- Donggeon (동건) (2020–2023)
- Chan (찬) (2020–2023)
- Jisu (지수) (2020–2023)
- Jaeyun (재윤) (2020–2023)
- J.You (제이유) (2020–2023)
- Kyungho (경호) (2020–2023)
- Daigo (다이고) (2022–2023)
- Yeojeong (여정) (2022–2023)

Former members

- Chihoon (치훈) (2020–2022)
- Minsu (민수) (2020–2022)
- Jerome (제롬) (2020–2022)
- Woonggi (웅기) (2020–2022)
- Renta (렌타) (2022–2023)

== Discography ==
=== Extended plays ===
Title	Details	Peak chart positions		Sales
Title	Details	KOR	JPN	Sales
TOO
Reason for Being: Benevolence	Released: April 1, 2020; Labels: n.CH Entertainment, Stone Music; Formats: CD, digital download; Track listing: 1. "Magnolia" (매그놀리아); 2. "Take It Slow" (오늘은 이만큼); 3. "Don't Fear Now" (피어나); 4. "Everything's Gonna Be Alright" (기억해요); 5. "You Can't Hurry Love"	4	—	KOR: 27,798
Running TOOgether	Released: July 15, 2020; Labels: n.CH Entertainment, Stone Music; Formats: CD, digital download; Track listing: 1. "Count 1, 2" (하나 둘 세고); 2. "Step by Step"; 3. "Better"; 4. "Taillight"; 5. "Dancing in the Moonlight"	9	—	KOR: 46,202
TO1
Re:Born	Released: May 20, 2021; Label: WakeOne, Stone Music; Formats: CD, digital download; Track listing: 1. "Reborn" (Intro.); 2. "Son of Beast"; 3. "Hot Sauce" (매운맛); 4. "Surf"; 5. "Hello Goodbye"; 6. "With You" (너만 있다면); 7. "Son of Beast" (English ver.); 8. "Don't Fear Now" (피어나) (TO1 ver.)	12	—	KOR: 46,635
Re:Alize	Released: November 4, 2021; Label: WakeOne, Stone Music; Formats: CD, digital download; Track listing: 1. "Realize" (Intro.); 2. "No More X"; 3. "Golden"; 4. "Prayer"; 5. "In My Light"; 6. "Mirage" (신기루); 7. "No More X" (English ver.); 8. "Infinite City" (Groundbreak ver.) (CD only)	7	—	KOR: 34,868
Why Not??	Released: July 28, 2022; Label: WakeOne, Stone Music; Formats: CD, digital download; Track listing: 1. "Boom Pow"; 2. "Drummin'"; 3. "What a Beautiful Day"; 4. "Sugar Shock"; 5. "Butterflies"	11	30	KOR: 48,879; JPN: 1,661
UP2U	Released: November 23, 2022; Label: WakeOne, Stone Music; Formats: CD, digital download; Track listing: 1. "Troublemaker"; 2. "Freeze Tag" (얼음 땡); 3. "Rude Boi"; 4. "Retro !ove" 5. "Fill In"	5	—	KOR: 50,600

=== Singles ===
==== As lead artist ====
Title	Year	Peak chart positions	Album
Title	Year	KOR Down.	Album
TOO
"Magnolia" (매그놀리아)	2020	—	Reason For Being: Benevolence
"Count 1, 2" (하나 둘 세고)	2020	—	Running TOOgether
TO1
"Son of Beast"	2021	—	Re:Born
"No More X"	2021	—	Re:Alize
"Drummin'"	2022	—	Why Not??
"Freeze Tag" (얼음 땡)	2022	193	UP2U

=== Soundtrack appearances ===
Year	Title	Member(s)	Album
2020	"Fly Away" (비상)	Donggeon, Jaeyun	Almost Famous OST
2022	"You Better Not"	Donggeon, Jaeyun	Ghost Doctor OST
2022	"Balloon"	Jaeyun, J.You	XX+XY OST
2022	"Young Forever"	Jaeyun, J.You (Note: Credited as TO1 but only features Jaeyun and J.You)	Street Man Fighter OST
2022	"OVERLAP"	Donggeon, Jaeyun, J.You (Note: Credited as TO1 but only features Donggeon, Jaeyun, and J.You)	Love Catcher in Bali OST
2023	"Dream Touch"	Donggeon, Chan, Jaeyun	The Haunted House Ghost Ball ZERO OST

== Filmography ==
- To Be World Klass (Mnet, 2019)
- Road to Kingdom (Mnet, 2020)
- TOO Mystery (Mnet, 2020)
- Welcome 2 HOUSE (Mnet, 2021)
- To.1Day (Mnet, 2021)
- TO1 High School (Mnet, 2022)
- Freeze Tag Race (Mnet, 2022)

== Videography ==
Year	Title	Album	Director(s)
2020	"Magnolia" (매그놀리아)	Reason For Being : 인	JA KYOUNG KIM (Flexible Pictures)
2020	"Count 1, 2" (하나 둘 세고)	Running TOOgether	Junwoo Lee (Salt Film)
2021	"Son of Beast"	Re:Born	N/A
2021	"No More X"	Re:Alize	N/A
2022	"Drummin'"	Why Not??	Kim Youngjo, Yoo Seungwoo (Naive Creative Production)
2022	"Freeze Tag" (얼음 땡)	UP2U	Ziyong Kim (FantazyLab)

== Awards and nominations ==
Name of the award ceremony, year presented, award category, nominee(s) of the award and the result of the nomination
Award ceremony	Year	Category	Nominee(s)/Work(s)	Result	Ref.
Asia Artist Awards	2020	Male Singer Popularity Award	TOO	Nominated	
Korea First Brand Awards	2020	New Male Artist Award	TOO	Nominated	
Soribada Best K-Music Awards	2020	Rookie Award	TOO	Won	
Mnet Asian Music Awards	2020	Best New Male Artist	TOO	Nominated	
Mnet Asian Music Awards	2020	Artist of the Year	TOO	Nominated	
Mnet Asian Music Awards	2020	Worldwide Icon of the Year	TOO	Nominated	
Golden Disc Awards	2021	Rookie Artist of the Year	TOO	Nominated	
Asia Artist Awards	2021	Male Idol Group Popularity Award	TO1	Nominated	
Mnet Japan Fan's Choice Awards	2022	Hot Icon	TO1	Won	
