= 35th Seoul Music Awards =

2026 South Korean music award ceremony

- Promotional poster for the 35th Seoul Music Awards
- Date: June 20, 2026
- Venue: Inspire Arena
- Country: South Korea
- Hosted by: Leeteuk; Leesol; Park Gun-wook

Highlights
- Most wins: BoyNextDoor; Lee Chan-won (4)
- Website: seoulmusicawards.com

Television/radio coverage
- Network: Abema

The 35th installment of the Seoul Music Awards is an award ceremony held on June 20, 2026, in Inspire Arena, South Korea. Organized by Seoul Music Awards Organizing Committee and Sports Seoul. The show is hosted by Leeteuk, Leesol, and Park Gun-wook.

== Criteria ==
Criteria based on Seoul Music Awards' official website.

Category	Online voting	Panelist	Music sales (Album/ Digital sales)
Grand Prize (Daesang)	—N/a	100%	—N/a
Best Music & Album	—N/a	100%	—N/a
Main Prize (Bonsang)	30%	40%	30%
Rookie Award	30%	40%	30%
Genre Awards	30%	40%	30%
Popularity Awards	100%	—N/a	
Special Awards	—N/a	100%	—N/a

== Performers ==
The final line up of performers were announced on June 4, 2026.

List of performances
Artist(s)	Song(s) performed
AHOF	"Pinocchio" "Sugar High"
Alpha Drive One	"Freak Alarm" "OMG!"
Ateez	"Say My Name" "Adrenaline"
BoyNextDoor	"Viral" "Hollywood Action"
Close Your Eyes	"Pose" "X" "Overdose" "We Are the Future" (with Idid)
Dayoung	"What's a Girl to Do" "Body"
Dragon Pony	"To You" "Oh Perfect!"
Hanroro	"Let Me Love My Youth" "0+0" "Goldfish"
Hearts2Hearts	"Rude!" "Focus"
Idid	"Attent!on" "Fly" "Fake Love"
Idntt	"Pretty Boy Swag" "ISTJ"
Izna	"Mamma Mia" "Metronome" "Diva"
KiiiKiii	"Underdogs" "404 (New Era)"
Kwon Eun-bi	"Door" "Hello Stranger"
Le Sserafim	"Spaghetti" "Boompala"
Lee Chan-won	"First Love" "Rock and Roll Life" "Maybe Today"
Modyssey	"Hook"
Roo'ra Izna Say My Name Xikers	"3!4!"
Say My Name	"UFO (Attention)" "Bad Girl Good Girl"
Sung Han-bin	"You Are Spring"
Xikers	"Okay" "Fantastic Baby"

== Presenters ==
The list of presenters were announced in June 2026.

- Go Youn-jung
- Kim Do-hoon
- Park Ji-hwan
- Song Joong-ki
- Shim Eun-kyung
- Lee Yu-bi
- Jo Yu-ri
- Ha Yoon-kyung
- Heo Nam-jun

== Winners and nominees ==
Winners and nominees were listed in alphabetical order. Winners were listed first and emphasized in bold.

=== Main awards ===
Grand Prize (Daesang)
**Ateez**
Main Prize (Bonsang)	Rookie of the Year
**Ateez**; **Alpha Drive One**; **BoyNextDoor**; **Dayoung**; **Hearts2Hearts**; **KiiiKiii**; **Kwon Eun-bi**; **Le Sserafim**; **Lee Chan-won**; **Zerobaseone**; List of nominees: 10cm; 2am; AB6IX; Aespa; AHOF; AllDay Project; Astro; Babymonster; Baekhyun; Close Your Eyes; Cortis; Enhypen; Exo; F.T. Island; G-Dragon; GOT7; Ha Sung-woon; I-dle; Idntt; IU; Ive; Izna; Jennie; JD1; Jin; Kang Daniel; Kim Jae-joong; Kim Se-jeong; Lee Jun-ho; Monsta X; Maktub; NCT Dream; NCT Wish; N.Flying; Nmixx; N.SSign; Oh My Girl; ONF; Ovan; Plave; Riize; Say My Name; Seventeen; SF9; Shinee; Stray Kids; Super Junior; Tempest; The Boyz; Tomorrow X Together; Treasure; TVXQ!; TWS; Twice; Unis; Woody; Xikers; Zo Zazz	**AHOF**; **Alpha Drive One**; **Close Your Eyes**; **Idid**; AllDay Project; AtHeart; AxMxP; Baby Dont Cry; Cortis; Idntt; Latency; Lngshot; OX:N; Xlov
Best Song Award	Best Album Award
**Le Sserafim – "Spaghetti" (featuring J-Hope)**	**BoyNextDoor**; **Zerobaseone**
Rock / Ballad Award	R&B / Hip-hop Award
**Hanroro**; 10cm; 2am; AKMU; Car, the Garden; Davichi; Damons Year; F.T. Island; Hwasa; Hwang Ka-ram; Jannabi; Jung Seung-hwan; Keon Ho-jeon; Kim Min-seok; Lee Mu-jin; Lim Jae-hyun; Maktub; Parc Jae-jung; Park Da-hye; Roy Kim; Soonsoonhee; Woody; Zo Zazz	**BoyNextDoor**; AB6IX; Babymonster; Blackpink; G-Dragon; Lee Young-ji; Meovv; Ovan; Stray Kids; Treasure; TNX; Woodz
OST Award	Trot Award
**Sung Han-bin – "You Are Spring" (from Spring Fever)**; Crush – "Love You with All My Heart" (from Queen of Tears); DK – "It's You" (from Resident Playbook); Eclipse – "Sudden Shower" (from Lovely Runner); Fromis 9 – "Touch Down" (from The Winning Try); Ha Sung-woon – "Loving You" (from To My Beloved Thief); Haechan – "The Reason I Like You" (from Second Shot at Love); Han – "Updraft" (from Typhoon Family); Huntrix – "Golden" (from KPop Demon Hunters); Jang Minho – "I Will Let Go" (from Bon Appétit, Your Majesty); Jongho – "Just Like the First Time" (from The Nice Guy); Lee Chang-sub – "Heavenly Fate" (from A Not So Fairy Tale); Lee Jun-ho – "Did You See the Rainbow?" (from Typhoon Family); Lim Young-woong – "Love Always Runs Away" (from Young Lady and Gentleman); Lia – "One Day" (from Ms. Incognito); MeloMance – "Love, Maybe" (from Business Proposal); Minnie – "Devil's Angel" (from Dear X); Nerd Connection – "If I Have You Only" (from My Love); Paul Kim – "Every Day, Every Moment" (from Should We Kiss First?); Plave – "Borrow Your Night" (from Even If This Love Disappears From the World Tonight); Saja Boys – "Soda Pop" (from KPop Demon Hunters); Sohee – "Love on the Canvas" (from Exchange); Sung Si-kyung – "Every Moment of You" (from My Love from the Star); Yoon San-ha & Arin – "Lovey Dovey" (from My Girlfriend Is the Man!); Young K – "Love Will Find A Way" (from Good Boy)	**Lee Chan-won**; Bin Ye-seo; Choi Soo-ho; Choi Woo-jin; Dong Geun-ha; Enoch; Eun Ga-eun; Hwang Min-woo; Jang Minho; JD1; Jeon Yu-jin; Kang Moon-kyung; Kim Jung-yeon; Kim Soo-chan; Kim Yong-pil; Lim Young-woong; Mai Jin; Min Jun-song; Park Hyun-ho; Park Ji-hyeon; Park Seo-jin; Park Sung-on; Seongri; Son Taejin; Young Tak; Yang Ji-won

=== Popularity awards ===
Popularity Award	K-Wave Special Award
**Lee Chan-won**; List of nominees: &TEAM; AB6IX; Aespa; AleXa; Astro; Ateez; Babymonster; BAE173; Baekho; Baekhyun; Big Ocean; BLACKPINK; BoA; BoyNextDoor; BTOB; BTS; CIX; CNBLUE; CRAVITY; DAY6; Doyoung; Enhypen; Evnne; Exo; FIFTY FIFTY; fromis_9; G-Dragon; GOT7; Ha Sung-woon; Hanroro; Hearts2Hearts; Highlight; Hori7on; Hwasa; I-dle; ILLIT; Infinite; ITZY; IU; Ive; Izna; JAESSBEE; JD1; Jin; JO1; Jung Kook; Kang Daniel; KiiiKiii; Kim Jae-joong; Kim Se-jeong; Kiss of Life; Le Sserafim; Lee Chan-hyuk; Lee Jun-ho; Lim Young-woong; MEOVV; Monsta X; NCT Dream; NCT Wish; NEXZ; N.Flying; NiziU; Nmixx; N.SSign; Oh My Girl; Oneus; ONF; P1Harmony; Plave; QWER; Riize; Say My Name; Seventeen; SF9; Shinee; Soyou; Stray Kids; Super Junior; Suzy; Tempest; The Boyz; TNX; Tomorrow X Together; Treasure; tripleS; TVXQ!; Twice; TWS; Unis; WayV; Xodiac; Zerobaseone	**BTS**; List of nominees: Aespa; AleXa; Astro; Ateez; BoyNextDoor; Enhypen; G-Dragon; GOT7; Ive; Jennie; Jin; Jisoo; JO1; Jung Kook; Le Sserafim; Nexz; Nmixx; N.SSign; NiziU; Rosé; Seventeen; Stray Kids; Super Junior; Tomorrow X Together; Treasure; Twice; Xlov; Xodiac; Zerobaseone
K-pop World Choice – Group	K-pop World Choice – Solo
**Super Junior**; List of nominees: &Team; Aespa; AHOF; AllDay Project; Alpha Drive One; Astro; Ateez; Babymonster; Blackpink; BoyNextDoor; BTS; Close Your Eyes; Cortis; Cravity; Enhypen; Evnne; Fifty Fifty; GOT7; Hearts2Hearts; Hori7on; I-dle; Idid; Illit; Itzy; Ive; Izna; JO1; KickFlip; KiiiKiii; Kiss of Life; Le Sserafim; Meovv; Monsta X; NCT Dream; NCT Wish; Nexz; NiziU; Nmixx; N.SSign; ONF; Oneus; P1Harmony; Plave; QWER; Riize; Say My Name; Seventeen; SF9; Shinee; Stray Kids; Tempest; The Boyz; Tomorrow X Together; Treasure; TripleS; TWS (group); Twice; WayV; Xikers; Xlov; Xodiac; Zerobaseone	**Yeonjun**; List of nominees: AleXa; Baekho; Baekhyun; Dayoung; Doyoung; G-Dragon; Ha Sung-woon; Haechan; Hwasa; IU; Jennie; Jimin; Jin; Jisoo; J-Hope; Jung Kook; Kai; Kang Daniel; Lee Changsub; Mark; Minnie; RM; Rosé; Suga; V; Yeji; Yuqi
Golden Revival	New Icon
**Exo – "The First Snow"**; List of nominees: AKMU – "How Can I Love the Heartbreak, You're the One I Love"; Crush – "Love You With All My Heart"; Day6 – "Congratulations"; Day6 – "Time of Our Life"; Gyeongseo Yeji and Jun Gun-ho – "If You Lovingly Call My Name"; Jannabi – "For Lovers Who Hesitate"; Jung Seung-hwan – "The Snowman"; Kim Min-seok – "Drunken Confession"; Paul Kim – "Every Day, Every Moment"; Sung Si-kyung – "Every Moment of You"; Woodz – "Drowning"	**D.O.**; List of nominees: Bona; Chani; IU; Jisoo; Kim Se-jeong; Lee Jun-ho; Lee Jun-young; Park Hyung-sik; Park Ji-hoon; Park Jin-young; Park Seo-ham; Rowoon; Suzy; Yim Si-wan; Yook Sung-jae
Best Artist
**Lee Chan-won**; List of nominees: AHOF; Alpha Drive One; Ateez; BoyNextDoor; Close Your Eyes; Dayoung; Dragon Pony; Hanroro; Hearts2Hearts; Idid; Idntt; Izna; KiiiKiii; Kwon Eun-bi; Le Sserafim; Modyssey; Say My Name; Xikers; Zerobaseone

=== Special awards ===
Best Group Award	Best Performance Award
**Zerobaseone**	**Izna**; **Xikers**
Best Solo Award	Band Award
**Dayoung**	**Dragon Pony**
Global Rookie	SMA Legend Award
**Idntt**; **Modyssey**; **Say My Name**	**Roo'ra**
World Best Artist
**BoyNextDoor**; **Le Sserafim**

== Multiple awards ==
The following artist(s) received two or more awards:

Count	Artist(s)
4	BoyNextDoor
4	Lee Chan-won
3	Le Sserafim
3	Zerobaseone
2	Alpha Drive One
2	Ateez
2	Dayoung
