= 2026 K-World Dream Awards =

2026 edition of award ceremony

- Promotional poster
- Date: August 27, 2026
- Venue: KINTEX, Goyang
- Country: South Korea
- Presented by: TV Daily
- Hosted by: Jun Hyun-moo; Jang Do-yeon
- Most awards: Ateez (4)

Television/radio coverage
- Network: U-Next (Japan); Fantheone (Worldwide)

The 2026 K-World Dream Awards was an award ceremony held at KINTEX in Goyang on August 25, 2026. It is the 2026 edition of the annual award show K-World Dream Awards. The award ceremony was hosted by Jun Hyun-moo and Jang Do-yeon. It was broadcast live in Japan via U-Next and worldwide via Fantheone.

== Performers ==
The line-up of performers were announced throughout July to August 2026.

Performances for the 2026 K-World Dream Awards
Artist(s)	Song(s) Performed
&Team	"Rush"
82Major	"Sign"
AHOF	"Run to You"
Alpha Drive One	"Born Dire"
Ampers&One	"God"
And2ble	"Curious"
Ateez	"Bad" "Adrenaline"
Evan	"Ride or Die"
Hearts2Hearts	"Rude!"
Hi-Fi Un!corn	"Beat it Beat it"
Idid	"Fly!"
Illit	"It's Me"
Jay B	"Layback"
KickFlip	"Eye-Poppin'"
KiiiKiii	"Pop Off Pop Off"
Le Sserafim	"Boompala" "Spaghetti"
Meovv	"Hit 'Em"
Nowz	"Achilles"
P1Harmony	"Unique"
Park Ji-hyeon	"Mu"
QWER	"Ceremony"
Rescene	"Deja Vu"
Riize	"Do Your Dance" "Fame"
SeeYa	"Stay"
Seongri	"Today This Night"
Xikers	"Okay"
Xlov	"Serve"

== Winner and nominees ==
The winners are listed in alphanumerical order and emphasized in bold.

=== Main & Special Awards ===
Best Artist	Artist of the Year
**Ateez**; **Le Sserafim**	**BTS**
Artist Award (Bonsang)	Best Album Artists
**&Team**; **Alpha Drive One**; **And2ble**; **Ateez**; **BTS**; **Cortis**; **Hearts2Hearts**; **Illit**; **KickFlip**; **KiiiKiii**; **Le Sserafim**; **P1Harmony**; **Riize**; **Stray Kids**	**BTS**; **Enhypen**; **NCT Wish**; **Tomorrow X Together**; **Blackpink**
**&Team**; **Alpha Drive One**; **And2ble**; **Ateez**; **BTS**; **Cortis**; **Hearts2Hearts**; **Illit**; **KickFlip**; **KiiiKiii**; **Le Sserafim**; **P1Harmony**; **Riize**; **Stray Kids**	Best Digital Music Artists
**&Team**; **Alpha Drive One**; **And2ble**; **Ateez**; **BTS**; **Cortis**; **Hearts2Hearts**; **Illit**; **KickFlip**; **KiiiKiii**; **Le Sserafim**; **P1Harmony**; **Riize**; **Stray Kids**	**Aespa**; **AKMU**; **Hwasa**; **I.O.I**; **Ive**; **Yena**
Best Visual Content	Global Music
**KiiiKiii**; **Rescene**; **Le Sserafim**	**&Team**; **Hearts2Hearts**; **KickFlip**
Journalist Pick Artist	Listeners’ Choice
**Riize**	**SeeYa**
Super Rookie	Best Stage
**And2ble**; **Alpha Drive One**; **Cortis**	**Ateez**; **Illit**; **P1Harmony**
Best Fandom	Best All-Rounder Musician
**AHOF**; **Rescene**	**Jay B**; **Evan**
Best Trot Artist	Best Band
**Park Ji-hyeon**; **Seongri**	**Hi-Fi Un!corn**; **QWER**
Global Spotlight	Global Next Leadership
**AHOF**; **Idid**; **Xikers**	**Ampers&One**; **Nowz**; **Xlov**
Best Producer
**Jung Hae-jang – YH Entertainment**

=== Popularity Awards ===
Popularity Award – Female	Popularity Award – Male
**Carmen**	**Park Ji-hyeon**
Popularity Award – Female Group	Popularity Award – Male Group
**Illit**	**Ateez**

== Multiple awards ==
The following artist(s) received two or more awards:

Count	Artist(s)
4	Ateez
3	BTS
3	Le Sserafim
3	Illit
2	&Team
2	AHOF
2	Alpha Drive One
2	And2ble
2	Cortis
2	Hearts2Hearts
2	KickFlip
2	KiiiKiii
2	P1Harmony
2	Park Ji-hyeon
2	Riize
2	Rescene
