= Lemon Tang =

- Digital cover

EP by Hearts2Hearts
- Released: June 22, 2026
- Length: 17:19
- Languages: Korean; English
- Label: SM
- Producers: Kenzie; No2zcat; Rouno; Hwang Hyun; Nild; Paprikaa; Im Jung-woo; 808Bhav808; Sebastian Thott

Hearts2Hearts chronology
Focus (2025)	Lemon Tang (2026)

Singles from Lemon Tang
- 1. "Rude!" Released: February 20, 2026; 2. "Lemon Tang" Released: June 22, 2026

Lemon Tang is the second extended play (EP) by the South Korean girl group Hearts2Hearts. It was released on June 22, 2026 by SM Entertainment and distributed by Kakao Entertainment. (Note: Compact disc (CD) release) Its promotion was supported by two singles: "Rude!" and "Lemon Tang", the latter of which accompanied the EP's release. It contains six songs that incorporate elements of various genres, including dance music, house, and bossa nova.

To promote the EP, the group performed "Lemon Tang" and "15-Love" on South Korean music shows, and partnered with various brands to open pop-up stores across Seoul. Commercially, it peaked at number two on South Korea's Circle Album Chart, and at number 11 on Japan's Oricon Albums Chart. It was certified 2x Platinum by the Korea Music Content Association for selling over five hundred thousand certified units.

== Background and release ==
On January 14, 2026, Ilgan Sports reported that Hearts2Hearts would release a new single in late February, marking their first release in three months since their first EP, Focus (2025). On February 6, SM Entertainment announced the release of "Rude!", alongside its release date of February 20. Sports Chosun reported on May 7 that an SM Entertainment earnings report scheduled a Hearts2Hearts mini album for release in the second quarter of the year. On June 1, SM Entertainment unveiled the title of their second EP, Lemon Tang, which was released June 22, alongside the single of the same name.

== Composition ==
The EP's opener is "Lemon Tang", an upbeat dance-pop track, which is also described as a "summer song". It is followed by "15-Love", which gets its title from the score of 15:0 in a tennis match, signifying when one side wins the first point. It includes guitar and synth sounds. The third track, "Baby Steps", is an upbeat comtemporary pop song, with elements of bossa nova.

The lyrics of the fourth track, "Heart Emoji (♡)", explore the feeling of unrequited love and wanting to peek into the other person's heart through a heart emoji amidst a confusing relationship. "Secret Recipe" is a pop song that prominently features drums and a syncopated percussion. The closer of Lemon Tang is "Rude!", which is a house-inspired dance song that features "bouncy" and "strong" synth bass sounds, alongside a repetitive hook structure.

== Critical reception ==
Professional ratings
Review scores
Source	Rating
IZM	3/5 stars

Im Dong-yeob of IZM rated Lemon Tang three stars out of five, calling the EP not "particularly stylish or filled with masterpieces" but a "moderate success", while highlighting the singles "Lemon Tang" and "Rude!", as well as "Heart Emoji (♡)".

== Promotion ==
=== Singles ===
"Rude!" was released on February 20, 2026, by SM Entertainment as a single on music download and streaming platforms. A music video for the song was released the same day. After initially debuting at number 129, it reached the top of the South Korea's Circle Digital Chart on the chart issue dated March 8–14. Globally, it debuted at number 80 on the Billboard Global 200 chart and number 37 on the Global Excl. U.S. chart. Two additional versions of the song were released: a Japanese-language version on March 17, and a remix single released by ScreaM Records on March 27.

"Lemon Tang" was released on June 22, simultaneously with the EP and its music video, which was filmed in Okinawa. Domestically, the song peaked at number 7 on the Circle Digital Chart, while internationally it debuted at number 99 on the Billboard Japan Hot 100 and number 181 on the Billboard Global Excl. U.S. chart. A Japanese version of the song was included on the group's first Japanese maxi single, Iconic Heart, which was released on August 12. The single also included the previously released version of "Rude!".

=== Brand collaborations ===
On June 14, 2026, a pop-up store commemorating the release of Lemon Tang was announced to be held from June 23–July 1 at the Hyundai Seoul B1 Event Plaza in Yeongdeungpo-gu, Seoul. An apparel collection with Musinsa was released on June 22, alongside a pop-up store in Musinsa Megastore Seongsu which ran until August 7. The group partnered with Benson Creamery to release a limited edition ice cream flavor named after the EP and a pop-up store in Apgujeong which ran until July 12.

=== Live performances ===
In promotion of Lemon Tang, the group performed on South Korean music television shows the songs "Lemon Tang" and "15-Love" from July–August. "Lemon Tang" was also included in the group's set list for the MyK Festa and Busan One Asia Festival. In Japan, Hearts2Hearts performed "Lemon Tang" on TV Asahi's Music Station on July 10, 2026, and at Tokyo Girls Collection at Ehime Prefectural Budokan on August 16, where they also performed the Japanese version of "Rude!".

== Track listing ==
Lemon Tang track listing
No.	Title	Lyrics	Music	Arrangement	Length
1.	"Lemon Tang"	Kenzie	Kenzie; Andrew Choi; No2zcat; Jsong; Rouno	Kenzie; No2zcat; Rouno	2:43
2.	"15-Love"	Hwang Hyun (MonoTree)	Hwang Hyun (MonoTree); Nild (MonoTree); Kwon Ae-jin (MonoTree); Anne Judith Wik; Louise Lindberg	Hwang Hyun (MonoTree); Nild (MonoTree)	2:35
3.	"Baby Steps"	Paprikaa	Paprikaa; Im Jung-woo	Paprikaa; Im Jung-woo	2:51
4.	"Heart Emoji (♡)"	Ondine	Lewis Jankel; Rachel Kanner; Frankie Day	Shift K3Y	2:59
5.	"Secret Recipe"	MRCH	Arineh Karimi; Maia Wright; Bhavik Pattani	808Bhav808	2:51
6.	"Rude!"	Park Tae-won; Danke; Lee Hyung-seok	Maya Rose; Sebastian Thott; Arineh Karimi	Sebastian Thott	3:20
Total length:					17:19

=== Notes ===
- "Heart Emoji (♡)" is stylized in all lowercase.
- "Rude!" and "15-Love" are stylized in all caps.

== Credits and personnel ==
The credits were adapted from the EP's liner notes.

=== Studios ===
- SM Aube – recording (track 1, 3–6), digital editing (1, 3–4)
- SM Droplet – recording (1–2), digital editing, engineered for mix (2)
- SM Dorii – recording (3, 6)
- SM Yellow Tail – recording, digital editing (5)
- SM Starlight – recording, digital editing (6)
- SM Wavelet – digital editing, engineered for mix (6)
- SM Blue Ocean – mixing (1–2)
- SM Concert Hall – mixing (3, 6)
- SM Blue Cup – mixing (4–5)
- Klang – mixing in Dolby Atmos
- Sterling Sound – mastering

=== Personnel ===
- SM Entertainment – executive producer
- Hearts2Hearts – vocals
- Kenzie – producer, vocal directing (1)
- Andrew Choi – background vocals (1)
- No2zcat – producer, programming (1)
- Jsong – vocal directing (1, 6), background vocals (1, 4, 6)
- Rouno – producer, programming (1)
- Hwang Hyun (MonoTree) – producer, vocal directing, digital editing (2)
- Nild (MonoTree) – producer (2)
- Kwon Ae-jin (MonoTree) – background vocals (2), vocal directing (2, 5)
- Paprikaa – producer (3)
- Im Jung-woo – producer, bass, guitar (3)
- Ondine – vocal directing (4)
- Lewis Jankel a.k.a. Shift K3Y – producer (4)
- Frankie Day – background vocals (4)
- MRCH – background vocals (5)
- Arineh Karimi – background vocals (6)
- Bhavik Pattani a.k.a. 808Bhav808 – producer (5)
- Sebastian Thott – producer (6)
- Maya Rose – background vocals (6)
- Iris – vocal directing, background vocals (3)
- Joowon – vocal directing (5)
- Kriz – vocal directing (6)
- Lee Tae-wook – guitar (2)
- Kim Hyo-joon – recording (1, 3–6), digital editing (1, 3–4)
- Kim Joo-hyun – recording (1–2), digital editing, engineered for mix (2)
- Jeong Jae-won – recording (3, 6)
- Noh Min-ji – recording, digital editing (5)
- Jeong Yoo-ra – recording, digital editing (6)
- Kang Eun-ji – digital editing, engineered for mix (6)
- Kim Cheol-sun – mixing (1–2)
- Nam Koong-jin – mixing (3, 6)
- Jung Eui-seok – mixing (4–5)
- Koo Jong-pil – mixing in Dolby Atmos
- Joe LaPorta – mastering

== Charts ==
=== Weekly charts ===
Weekly chart performance
Chart (2026)	Peak position
Japanese Albums (Oricon)	11
Japanese Combined Albums (Oricon)	11
Japanese Hot Albums (Billboard Japan)	12
South Korean Albums (Circle)	2

=== Monthly charts ===
Monthly chart performance
Chart (2026)	Peak position
Japanese Albums (Oricon)	26
South Korean Albums (Circle)	5

== Certifications and sales ==
Certifications and sales
Region	Certification	Certified units/sales
South Korea (KMCA)	2× Platinum	500,000^{^}
Japan (Oricon)	—N/a	9,156
^{^} Shipments figures based on certification alone.

== Release history ==
List of release dates and formats
Region	Date	Format	Label
South Korea	June 22, 2026	CD	SM
Various	June 22, 2026	Music download; streaming	SM
