= 2025 K-World Dream Awards =

2025 edition of award ceremony

- Promotional poster
- Date: August 21, 2025
- Venue: Jamsil Indoor Stadium, Seoul
- Country: South Korea
- Presented by: TV Daily
- Hosted by: Jun Hyun-moo; Jang Do-yeon
- Most awards: Stray Kids (4)

Television/radio coverage
- Network: hellolive

The 2025 K-World Dream Awards was an award ceremony held at Jamsil Indoor Stadium in Seoul on August 21, 2025. It is the 2025 edition of the annual award show K-World Dream Awards. The award ceremony was hosted by Jun Hyun-moo and Jang Do-yeon. It was broadcast live worldwide via hellolive.

== Performers ==
The line-up of performers were announced throughout June to July 2025.

Performances for Day 1
Artist(s)	Song(s) Performed
AHOF	"Rendezvous"
BtoB	"Love Today"
Cravity	"Set Net Go?!"
Dragon Pony	"Earth Boy"
Fifty Fifty	"Pookie"
Hearts2Hearts	"Style"
Illit	"Jellyous"
Ive	"Rebel Heart" "Attitude"
Kang Daniel	"Episode"
KickFlip	"Freeze"
KiiiKiii	"I Do Me"
Le Sserafim	"Hot" "Come Over"
Lucy	"Hippo"
NCT Wish	"Poppop" "Surf"
Newbeat	"Cappucino"
Paul Kim	"Everyday, Every Moment"
QWER	"Dear"
Stray Kids	"Chk Chk Boom" "Walkin on Water"
TripleS	"Are You Alive"
Xdinary Heroes	"Fire (My Sweet Misery)"
Young Posse	"Freestyle"

== Winner and nominees ==
The winners are listed in alphanumerical order and emphasized in bold.

=== Main & Special Awards ===
Best Artist
**Ive**; **Stray Kids**
Bonsang	Best Album Artists
**Illit**; **Ive**; **Le Sserafim**; **NCT Wish**; **Stray Kids**; **Tomorrow X Together**; **TripleS**; **QWER**	**Aespa**; **Enhypen**; **NCT Dream**; **Plave**; **Seventeen**
**Illit**; **Ive**; **Le Sserafim**; **NCT Wish**; **Stray Kids**; **Tomorrow X Together**; **TripleS**; **QWER**	Best Digital Music Artists
**Illit**; **Ive**; **Le Sserafim**; **NCT Wish**; **Stray Kids**; **Tomorrow X Together**; **TripleS**; **QWER**	**Day6**; **G-Dragon**; **IU**; **Rosé**
World Class Artist	Journalist Pick Artist
**Ive**; **Le Sserafim**; **Stray Kids**; **Tomorrow X Together**	**Le Sserafim**; **NCT Wish**
**Ive**; **Le Sserafim**; **Stray Kids**; **Tomorrow X Together**	Global Music Artist
**Ive**; **Le Sserafim**; **Stray Kids**; **Tomorrow X Together**	**Tomorrow X Together**
Super Rookie	New Vision
**AHOF**; **Hearts2Hearts**; **KickFlip**; **KiiiKiii**	**Newbeat**; **Fifty Fifty**; **Close Your Eyes**
Rookie Band	Best Band
**Dragon Pony**	**Lucy**; **Xdinary Heroes**
Best Music Video	Best Performance
**Illit**; **TripleS**; **Young Posse**	**Cravity**; **Fifty Fifty**; **NCT Wish**
Best All-Rounder Musician	Best Trot Artist
**Kang Daniel**; **QWER**	**Park Ji-hyeon**; **Park Seo-jin**
Listener Choice	Best Producer
**Btob**; **Paul Kim**	**Seo Hyun-joo** **(Starship Entertainment)**
Best OST
**Huntrix – "Golden" (from KPop Demon Hunters)**

=== Popularity Awards ===
Popularity Award – Female	Popularity Award – Male
**Jang Won-young**	**Park Ji-hyeon**
Popularity Award – Group
**Stray Kids**

== Multiple awards ==
The following artist(s) received two or more awards:

Count	Artist(s)
4	Stray Kids
3	Ive
3	Le Sserafim
3	NCT Wish
3	Tomorrow X Together
2	Illit
2	Park Ji-hyeon
2	QWER
2	TripleS
