= Focus (Hearts2Hearts EP) =

EP by Hearts2Hearts
- Released: October 20, 2025
- Studios: SM Aube (Seoul); SM Big Shot (Seoul); SM Droplet (Seoul); SM Wavelet (Seoul); SM Yellow Tail (Seoul)
- Length: 18:59
- Language: Korean
- Labels: SM; Kakao

Hearts2Hearts chronology
The Chase (2025)	Focus (2025)	Lemon Tang (2026)

Singles from Focus
- 1. "Pretty Please" Released: September 24, 2025; 2. "Focus" Released: October 20, 2025

Focus is the first extended play by South Korean girl group Hearts2Hearts. It was released by SM Entertainment on October 20, 2025, and contains six tracks, including the standalone single "Style" (only on physical releases), the lead single "Pretty Please", and the title track of the same name.

== Background and release ==
On September 22, 2025, SM Entertainment announced that Hearts2Hearts would release their first extended play, Focus, on October 20, 2025. On the same day, the promotional schedule was released. It was also announced that "Pretty Please" would be pre-released on September 24; the song alongside its music video were released on that date. On October 10, a trailer was released. Mood sampler videos were released on October 13 and October 15. On October 17, the music video teaser for "Focus" was released. The extended play was released alongside the music video for "Focus" on October 20.

== Composition ==
Focus contains six tracks. The opening track, "Focus", is a house song featuring "vintage piano riff" and lyrics "sensually describing the state of being completely focused on the other person". The second track, "Apple Pie", is a nu-disco song characterized by "blends of funky bassline, analog drum sounds, and glossy synths" with lyrics "comparing a night of girls sharing their own secrets to a pajama party where they all eat apple pie together". The third track, "Pretty Please", is a new jack swing dance song with lyrics "containing the excitement and precious moment when just being there brings joy to each other on a journey together".

The fourth track, "Flutter", is a city pop song that "harmonizes strings, horns, and warm keyboard sounds" with lyrics about "making the first move toward a hesitant partner". The fifth track, "Blue Moon", is an R&B-based pop ballad song featuring a "guitar melody and dreamy synth sound". The final track on physical releases, "Style", is an uptempo dance song featuring a "cheerful rhythm and groovy bass" with lyrics "expressing curiosity and ambiguous feelings toward someone with a seemingly indifferent yet firm style".

== Promotion ==
Following the release of Focus, on October 20, 2025, Hearts2Hearts hosted a live event to introduce the extended play and engage with their fanbase.

== Track listing ==
Focus track listing – Digital
No.	Title	Lyrics	Music	Arrangement	Length
1.	"Focus"	Kenzie	David Wilson; Michael Matosic; Dewain Whitmore; Hailey Collier	Dwilly; Michael Matosic	2:57
2.	"Apple Pie"	Ondine	Micah Gordon; Gina Kushka	Micah Gordon	3:06
3.	"Pretty Please"	Saay (Soultriii)	Saay (Soultriii); Deez (Soultriii); Soulfish (Soultriii)	Deez (Soultriii); Soulfish (Soultriii)	3:24
4.	"Flutter"	Kenzie	Kenzie; Andrew Choi; No2zcat; Jsong	Kenzie; No2zcat	3:05
5.	"Blue Moon"	Jo Yoon-kyung; Kang Eun-yu	Rasmus Gregersen; Daniel Michael Victor; Amanda Thomsen; Haventseenyou	DMV & Ras; Haventseenyou	2:57
Total length:					15:29

Focus track listing – Physical
No.	Title	Lyrics	Music	Arrangement	Length
6.	"Style"	Kenzie	Mike Daley; Mitchell Owens; Adrian McKinnon; Sara Forsberg	Mike Daley; Mitchell Owens	3:30
Total length:					18:59

== Credits and personnel ==
Credits adapted from the EP's liner notes.

Studio

- SM Droplet Studio – recording (track 1–5), digital editing, engineered for mix (track 2, 4)
- SM Yellow Tail Studio – recording (track 6), digital editing, engineered for mix (track 1, 6)
- SM Aube Studio – recording (track 3, 6), digital editing, engineered for mix (track 3)
- SM Wavelet Studio – recording, digital editing, engineered for mix (track 5)
- SM Big Shot Studio – recording, digital editing, mixing (track 5)
- Soultriii Studio – digital editing (track 3)
- SM Starlight Studio – digital editing (track 4)
- SM Blue Cup Studio – mixing (track 1)
- SM Blue Ocean Studio – mixing (track 2, 4)
- SM Concert Hall Studio – mixing (track 3, 6)
- Klang Studio – mixing in Dolby Atmos (track 6)
- Sterling Sound – mastering (all tracks)

Personnel

- SM Entertainment – executive producer
- Hearts2Hearts – vocals (all tracks)
- Kenzie – lyrics (track 1, 4, 6), composition, arrangement (track 4)
- David Wilson a.k.a. Dwilly – composition, arrangement (track 1)
- Michael Matosic – composition, arrangement (track 1)
- Dewain Whitmore – composition, background vocals (track 1)
- Hailey Collier – composition (track 1)
- Ondine – lyrics, vocal directing (track 2)
- Micah Gordon – composition, arrangement (track 2)
- Gina Kushka – composition, background vocals (track 2)
- Saay (Soultriii) – lyrics, composition, vocal directing, background vocals (track 3)
- Deez (Soultriii) – composition, arrangement, background vocals, bass, keyboard, synthesizer, programming, digital editing (track 3)
- Soulfish (Soultriii) – composition, arrangement, bass, keyboard, synthesizer, programming (track 3)
- Andrew Choi – composition, intro narrating (track 4)
- No2zcat – composition, arrangement, bass, synthesizer, programming (track 4)
- Jsong – composition (track 4), vocal directing (track 1, 4–6), background vocals (track 1, 4, 6)
- Jo Yoon-kyung – lyrics (track 5)
- Kang Eun-yu – lyrics (track 5)
- Rasmus Gregersen a.k.a. Ras (DMV & Ras) – composition, arrangement (track 5)
- Daniel Michael Victor a.k.a. DMV (DMV & Ras) – composition, arrangement (track 5)
- Amanda Thomsen – composition, background vocals (track 5)
- Haventseenyou – composition, arrangement (track 5)
- Mike Daley – composition, arrangement (track 6)
- Mitchell Owens – composition, arrangement (track 6)
- Adrian McKinnon – composition (track 6)
- Sara Forsberg – composition, background vocals (track 6)
- Ikki – background vocals (track 2, 5)
- Red Anne – vocal directing (track 5)
- Iris – vocal directing (track 5)
- Kim Chan-ho a.k.a. Greentea (Kim Nok-cha) – guitar (track 4)
- Vella – synthesizer (track 4)
- Young – guitar (track 5)
- Kim Joo-hyun – recording (track 1–5), digital editing, engineered for mix (track 2, 4)
- Noh Min-ji – recording (track 6), digital editing, engineered for mix (track 1, 6)
- Kim Hyo-joon – recording (track 3, 6), digital editing, engineered for mix (track 3)
- Kang Eun-ji – recording, digital editing, engineered for mix (track 5)
- Lee Min-kyu – recording, digital editing, mixing (track 5)
- Jeong Yoo-ra – digital editing (track 4)
- Jung Eui-seok – mixing (track 1)
- Kim Cheol-sun – mixing (track 2, 4)
- Nam Koong-jin – mixing (track 3, 6)
- Koo Jong-pil – mixing in Dolby Atmos (track 6)
- Chris Gehringer – mastering (all tracks)

== Charts ==
=== Weekly charts ===
Weekly chart performance for Focus
Chart (2025)	Peak position
Japanese Albums (Oricon)	13
Japanese Combined Albums (Oricon)	13
Japanese Download Albums (Billboard Japan)	11
Japanese Top Albums Sales (Billboard Japan)	12
South Korean Albums (Circle)	4

=== Monthly charts ===
Monthly chart performance for Focus
Chart (2025)	Position
Japanese Albums (Oricon)	20
South Korean Albums (Circle)	9

=== Year-end charts ===
Year-end chart performance for Focus
Chart (2025)	Position
South Korean Albums (Circle)	66

== Certifications ==
Certifications for Focus
Region	Certification	Certified units/sales
South Korea (KMCA)	Platinum	250,000^{^}
^{^} Shipments figures based on certification alone.

== Accolades ==
=== Year-end lists ===
Year-end lists
Publication	List	Rank	Ref.
Billboard	The 25 Best K-Pop Albums of 2025: Staff Picks	18	
Idology	Top 20 Albums of 2025	Placed	

== Release history ==
Release history for Focus
Region	Date	Format	Label
South Korea	October 20, 2025	CD	SM; Kakao
Various	October 20, 2025	Digital download; streaming	SM; Kakao
