= Mrch =

South Korean musician (born 1996)

MRCH 마치
- Born: Yoon Ji-young; March 28, 1996 (age 30)
- Occupations: Singer-songwriter; composer; lyricist
- Instrument: Vocals
- Years active: 2019–present
- Label: The Only Scent

Korean name
- Hangul: 윤지영
- RR: Yun Jiyeong
- MR: Yun Chiyŏng

Stage name
- Hangul: 윤마치
- RR: Yun Machi
- MR: Yun Mach'i

Yoon Ji-young (Korean: 윤지영; born March 28, 1996), known professionally as MRCH (마치) or Yoon MRCH (윤마치), is a South Korean singer-songwriter and composer. She first drew attention in 2018 as a contestant on Mnet's I Can See Your Voice and released her debut EP, Let's March!, in 2019. As a songwriter, she has written for Twice, including "Talk That Talk", and for Nmixx, Itzy, Woo!ah!, YENA and Hearts2Hearts. As of 2026, she has released five EPs and has performed at several South Korean music festivals, including the Incheon Pentaport Rock Festival.

== Early life and education ==
MRCH was born Yoon Ji-young on March 28, 1996. An aunt who worked as a composer introduced her to music as a child, and under her influence she began studying classical composition. She started writing music in middle school. While preparing for the university entrance exams, she formed a band at a popular-music academy. In 2015 she entered Yonsei University to study composition, where she was a member of a musical theatre club.

== Career ==
=== 2018–2021: Television appearances and Let's March! ===
In February 2018 MRCH appeared as a contestant on Mnet's I Can See Your Voice 5, where she was nicknamed the "Yonsei BoA" for her resemblance to the singer BoA. She returned for a special performance on the season's final episode in April 2018. After the broadcast she received offers from entertainment companies, but chose to release an album of her own first.

Her debut EP, Let's March!, was released on August 14, 2019, under the name 마치 (MRCH). It contained three songs she co-wrote with Joe Layne. The name comes from the English word for her birth month, March. She later added her surname, becoming 윤마치, so that she would be easier to find on Korean web portals; the English form, MRCH, was kept. Later in 2019 she competed under her real name on the first episode of Channel A's Vocal Play 2, performing "Like a Movie" (영화처럼) from the EP. In 2021 she released the single "Still Romantic" and contributed two songs to Perfect Feeling, a split EP with Nakwon.

=== 2022–2023: Love & Fear and Oh, Life ===
MRCH's second EP, Love & Fear, co-produced with composer Lee Woo-min "collapsedone", was released on December 12, 2022. On March 17, 2023, she held her first solo concert, Movie Night, at Rolling Hall in Seoul. In October 2023 she released her third EP, Oh, Life, with the double lead singles "Lovers" and "Surrender" (항복). Songs from the EP, including "Surrender", became popular online.

=== 2024–2025: The Earth ===
MRCH was selected for two talent-development programmes: the Korea Creative Content Agency's Muse On, for new musicians, and, on her second attempt, the CJ Cultural Foundation's Tune Up, which picks about six independent acts a year and funds their recordings and concerts. She was also one of five finalists in the Gyeonggi Content Agency's 2024 Indiestance competition. In October 2024 she performed at Hyundai Card's Curated 95 concert alongside Hanroro and QWER, and sang "Sales", the first soundtrack single for the JTBC drama A Virtuous Business. She also sang "Come with Me" for the ENA drama Brewing Love. She released the single "Human Mechanism", co-written with Lee, on November 21, 2024, ahead of her fourth EP, The Earth, which followed on December 18. Both of her solo concerts for the EP, on December 28 and 29 at Shinhan Card SOL Pay Square in Seoul, sold out.

In January 2025 she was named an ambassador of Amorepacific's Gonggam (Empathy) Foundation. In April she released a remake of Loveholic's 2003 song "Loveholic" with singer Park Ki-young, followed by the singles "Green We Shared" (초록) in May and "Peachy" in August. On August 17, 2025, she appeared as a masked contestant on MBC's King of Mask Singer. That year the sports and entertainment newspaper Ilgan Sports wrote that she was known among music fans as a "festival goddess", having played nearly every major Korean festival in 2024. She performed at the Incheon Pentaport Rock Festival in August 2025.

=== 2026–present: Mutualism ===
MRCH released her fifth EP, Mutualism (상생관계), on July 7, 2026. Earlier that year she sang for the soundtracks of the dramas The Practical Guide to Love and See You at Work Tomorrow!. On March 28, her birthday, she held a concert with her fans, known as Manchwidan (만취단), and donated ₩3.28 million to ChildFund Korea. In April 2026 the South Korean daily newspaper The Chosun Ilbo described her as one of the most sought-after acts for Korean music festivals. On July 3 she performed at the Donauinselfest in Vienna, Austria, on the festival's Inspire Me Korea stage.

=== Songwriting for other artists ===
Lee Woo-min, a composer with JYP Publishing, saw MRCH's performance on I Can See Your Voice and invited her to sing on his personal album. Through him she began writing for JYP Entertainment artists, without signing with the company. In 2022 she wrote the lyrics for Woo!ah!'s "Catch the Stars" and "Rollercoaster". Her debut as a composer for other artists was Twice's Japanese-language song "Celebrate" (2022), followed by "Talk That Talk", the lead single of the group's EP Between 1&2, which she co-composed and co-arranged with Lee. She wrote the lyrics and co-composed Twice's "Got the Thrills" (2023), and in 2024 co-composed Itzy member Yuna's solo song "Yet, But" with Yuna and Lee, and Nmixx's "Moving On".

In 2026 she co-wrote and featured on YENA's song "Sticker", from YENA's fifth mini album Love Catcher. The same year she co-composed Itzy member Lia's solo song "Asylum" on the EP Motto and wrote the lyrics for Hearts2Hearts' "Secret Recipe". She has also co-written and featured on songs by moneto, including "Lullaby" (자장가), "Classic" and "She".

== Musical style and influences ==
The Chosun Ilbo wrote that songs such as "Peachy" and "Green We Shared" were praised by critics for their well-crafted portrayal of youth, mixing joy and restlessness, and compared her voice to those of Kim Yuna of Jaurim and Park Ki-young. She has described herself as a live performer first, and chose the songs on The Earth for how they would work on stage, giving the EP a band-based sound. She grew up listening to Green Day, Muse, Paramore, Girls' Generation and Wonder Girls, and has named Kim Yuna as a model.

== Discography ==
=== Extended plays ===
List of extended plays
Title	Details
Let's March!	Released: August 14, 2019
Love & Fear	Released: December 12, 2022
Oh, Life	Released: October 18, 2023
The Earth	Released: December 18, 2024; Label: The Only Scent
Mutualism	Released: July 7, 2026; Label: The Only Scent

=== Singles ===
==== As lead artist ====
List of singles as lead artist
Title	Year	Album	Ref.
"Still Romantic" (아직은 낭만)	2021	Non-album singles	
"Dawn Flight" (with Yeomi)	2021	Non-album singles	
"My World Your World" (나의 세상 너의 세상)	2022	Non-album singles	
"Tricky"	2022	Non-album singles	
"Color It"	2022	Non-album singles	
"Aim for Love: Heart Hunter Queen" (featuring Supercell Games)	2023	Non-album singles	
"To the Dawn" (새벽에게)	2023	Non-album singles	
"Between the Two of Us" (with LAS)	2023	Non-album singles	
"It's Me!" (나인데)	2024	Non-album singles	
"The Only Scent" (유일한 향기)	2024	Non-album singles	
"Hi!" (안녕!)	2024	Non-album singles	
"Good Feeling" (좋은 예감) (with Mimiminu)	2024	Non-album singles	
"Human Mechanism"	2024	The Earth	
"Dream" (좋은 분위기) (with will hyde and YENTED)	2025	Non-album singles	
"Loveholic" (with Park Ki-young)	2025	Non-album singles	
"Green We Shared" (초록)	2025	Non-album singles	
"Peachy"	2025	Non-album singles	

==== As featured artist ====
List of singles as featured artist
Title	Year	Album	Ref.
"Classic" (moneto featuring MRCH)	2022	Non-album singles	
"She" (moneto featuring MRCH)	2023	Non-album singles	
"For Me" (JinJin featuring MRCH)	2024	Non-album singles	

=== Soundtrack appearances ===
List of soundtrack appearances
Title	Year	Soundtrack	Ref.
"Hear My Love"	2022	O'PENing: Flavor of Your Voice OST	
"The Moments of Us" (서로로 채워 나갈 순간들)	2023	The Heavenly Idol OST	
"Only for You"	2024	Branding in Seongsu OST	
"Eternal Bloom" (Korean version)	2024	Lord of Heroes OST	
"Sales" (세일즈)	2024	A Virtuous Business OST	
"Come with Me"	2024	Brewing Love OST	
"More and More"	2025	Love Scout OST	
"I Feel Special"	2026	The Practical Guide to Love OST	
"After Work" (퇴근길)	2026	See You at Work Tomorrow! OST	

=== Guest appearances ===
List of guest appearances
Title	Year	Other artist(s)	Album	Ref.
"Hollow"	2019	Houdini	Hollow	
"The End"	2020	Seo Jun-hyeok	Mokdong Museum of Contemporary Art	
"Lullaby" (자장가)	2021	moneto	Lullaby	
"The Way It Goes"	2021	Nakwon	Perfect Feeling	
"Rosy"	2021	Nakwon	Perfect Feeling	
"I Like You"	2021	—N/a	Bright #10	
"Décalcomanie"	2022	Kim Jong-hyeon	Meridiem	
"Wonderland" (acoustic version)	2024	—N/a	Indiestance 2024	
"White Dwarf" (백색왜성)	2025	Deepshower, Youngcode	몽중록	
"Sticker"	2026	YENA	Love Catcher	

=== Songwriting credits ===
Songs written for other artists
Year	Artist	Song	Album	Lyrics	Music	Arrangement
2022	Woo!ah!	"Catch the Stars"	Non-album single	Yes	No	No
2022	Twice	"Celebrate"	Celebrate	No	Yes	No
2022	Twice	"Talk That Talk"	Between 1&2	No	Yes	Yes
2022	Woo!ah!	"Rollercoaster"	Pit-a-Pat	Yes	No	No
2023	Twice	"Got the Thrills"	Ready to Be	Yes	Yes	No
2024	Itzy (Yuna)	"Yet, But"	Born to Be	No	Yes	No
2024	Nmixx	"Moving On"	Fe3O4: Stick Out	No	Yes	No
2026	YENA	"Sticker" (featuring MRCH)	Love Catcher	Yes	Yes	No
2026	Itzy (Lia)	"Asylum"	Motto	No	Yes	No
2026	Hearts2Hearts	"Secret Recipe"	Lemon Tang	Yes	No	No
