= Pretty Please (Hearts2Hearts song) =

- Digital cover

Single by Hearts2Hearts

from the EP Focus
- Language: Korean
- Released: September 24, 2025
- Genre: New jack swing; dance
- Length: 3:24
- Label: SM; Kakao
- Composers: Saay (Soultriii); Deez (Soultriii); Soulfish (Soultriii)
- Lyricist: Saay (Soultriii)

Hearts2Hearts singles chronology
"Style" (2025)	"Pretty Please" (2025)	"Focus" (2025)

Music video
- "Pretty Please" on YouTube

"Pretty Please" is a song recorded by South Korean girl group Hearts2Hearts for their first extended play Focus. Written by Soultriii members Saay, Deez and Soulfish, it was released on September 24, 2025, by SM Entertainment as a pre-release single from the EP.

== Background and release ==
On September 22, 2025, SM Entertainment announced that Hearts2Hearts would release their first extended play, Focus, on October 20. On the same day, the promotional schedule was released. It was also announced that "Pretty Please" would be pre-released on September 24. The following day, the music video teaser was released. The song was released alongside its music video on September 24.

== Composition ==
"Pretty Please" was written and composed by Saay, with fellow Soultriii members Deez and Soulfish contributing to the composition and arrangement. The song was described as a new jack swing dance song with lyrics "containing the excitement and precious moment when just being there brings joy to each other on a journey together".

== Music video ==
The music video, directed by Annie Chung of Life Images Film in collaboration with Pokémon Legends: Z-A, was released alongside the song by SM Entertainment on September 24. The visual portrays "Hearts2Hearts enjoying their life with colorful Pokémon elements that appear throughout their daily lives".

== Promotion ==
Hearts2Hearts performed the song on three music programs: KBS's Music Bank on September 26, MBC's Show! Music Core on September 27, and SBS's Inkigayo on September 28.

== Credits and personnel ==
Credits adapted from the EP's liner notes.

Studio

- SM Aube Studio – recording, digital editing, engineered for mix
- SM Droplet Studio – recording
- Soultriii Studio – digital editing
- SM Concert Hall Studio – mixing
- Sterling Sound – mastering

Personnel

- SM Entertainment – executive producer
- Hearts2Hearts – vocals
- Saay (Soultriii) – lyrics, composition, vocal directing, background vocals
- Deez (Soultriii) – composition, arrangement, background vocals, bass, keyboard, synthesizer, programming, digital editing
- Soulfish (Soultriii) – composition, arrangement, bass, keyboard, synthesizer, programming
- Kim Hyo-joon – recording, digital editing, engineered for mix
- Kim Joo-hyun – recording
- Nam Koong-jin – mixing
- Chris Gehringer – mastering

== Charts ==
=== Weekly charts ===
Chart performance for "Pretty Please"
Chart (2025)	Peak position
China (TME Korean)	30
South Korea (Circle)	95

=== Monthly charts ===
Chart performance for "Pretty Please"
Chart (2025)	Position
South Korea (Circle)	101

== Release history ==
Release history for "Pretty Please"
Region	Date	Format	Label
Various	September 24, 2025	Digital download; streaming	SM; Kakao
