= Hearts2Hearts =

South Korean girl group

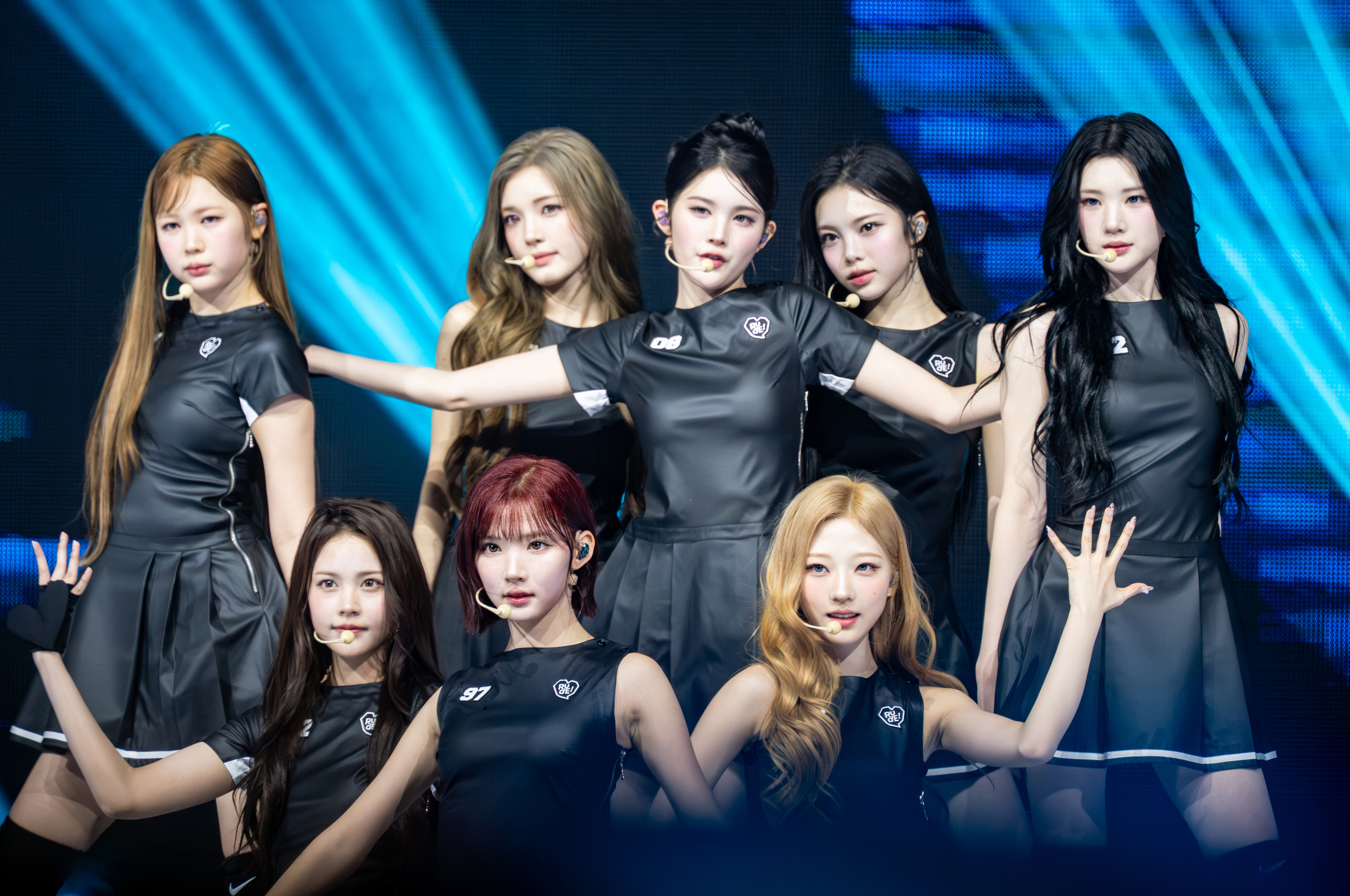
- Hearts2Hearts in February 2026; Left to right, standing: Ye-on, Yuha, A-na, Ian, Juun; Left to right, kneeling: Carmen, Jiwoo, Stella

Background information
- Origin: Seoul, South Korea
- Genre: K-pop
- Years active: 2025–present
- Labels: SM; EMI/Universal Japan
- Member of: SM Town
- Members: Carmen; Jiwoo; Yuha; Stella; Juun; A-na; Ian; Ye-on
- Website: hearts2hearts

Hearts2Hearts (Korean: 하츠투하츠) is a South Korean girl group formed by SM Entertainment. The group consists of eight members: Carmen, Jiwoo, Yuha, Stella, Juun, A-na, Ian, and Ye-on. They debuted on February 24, 2025, with the single album The Chase and its lead single of the same name.

== Name ==
According to SM Entertainment's report, the group name, Hearts2Hearts, means "to connect with global fans through a mysterious musical world filled with various emotions and heartfelt messages, and move forward together as a greater 'us'". The name's inclusion of "S2" is a reference to a heart emoticon.

== Career ==
=== 2023–2025: Formation ===
News of a new girl group from SM Entertainment first came in February 2023 when the company announced their new SM 3.0 business strategy. In the announcement video, CEO Chris Sung-soo Lee and COO Tak Young-jun said that SM would debut four new acts in 2023, including a girl group. Another video released later in May of CEO Jang Cheol-hyuk announcing the company's plans for 2023 reiterated the launch of a new girl group in the fourth quarter of the year. However, the group's debut was delayed several times, with the news being released each time in the company's earnings reports. The first delay came in August 2023, with SM stating the group would now debut in the first half of 2024. The debut was again delayed in May 2024, moving the group's debut to the fourth quarter of the year. In November 2024, SM updated their schedule for the final time, pushing the group's debut to the first quarter of 2025.

At the end of SM's 30th anniversary celebration SM Town Live 2025 concert at Gocheok Sky Dome on January 12, a surprise trailer was played that revealed the group's name and eight members, though their individual names were not released. The trailer also revealed that the group would debut in February 2025. The next day, South Korean media, including Maeil Business Newspaper and The Korea Economic Daily, reported that Hearts2Hearts would debut on February 24, with promotions beginning in late January. Following the group's reveal, their company's stock experienced a 4.5% increase on the Korea Exchange at the closing of its trading day, with an additional gain of 6.94% the next day. Hearts2Hearts is SM's first girl group since founder and executive producer Lee Soo-man left the company in 2023. With 8 members, it is also SM's largest girl group since Girls' Generation debuted in 2007 with 9 members. Pop culture critic Ha Jae-geun noted that the group will be a "test" of the SM 3.0 corporate production strategy that was introduced in the wake of Lee's departure.

=== 2025–present: Introduction and debut ===
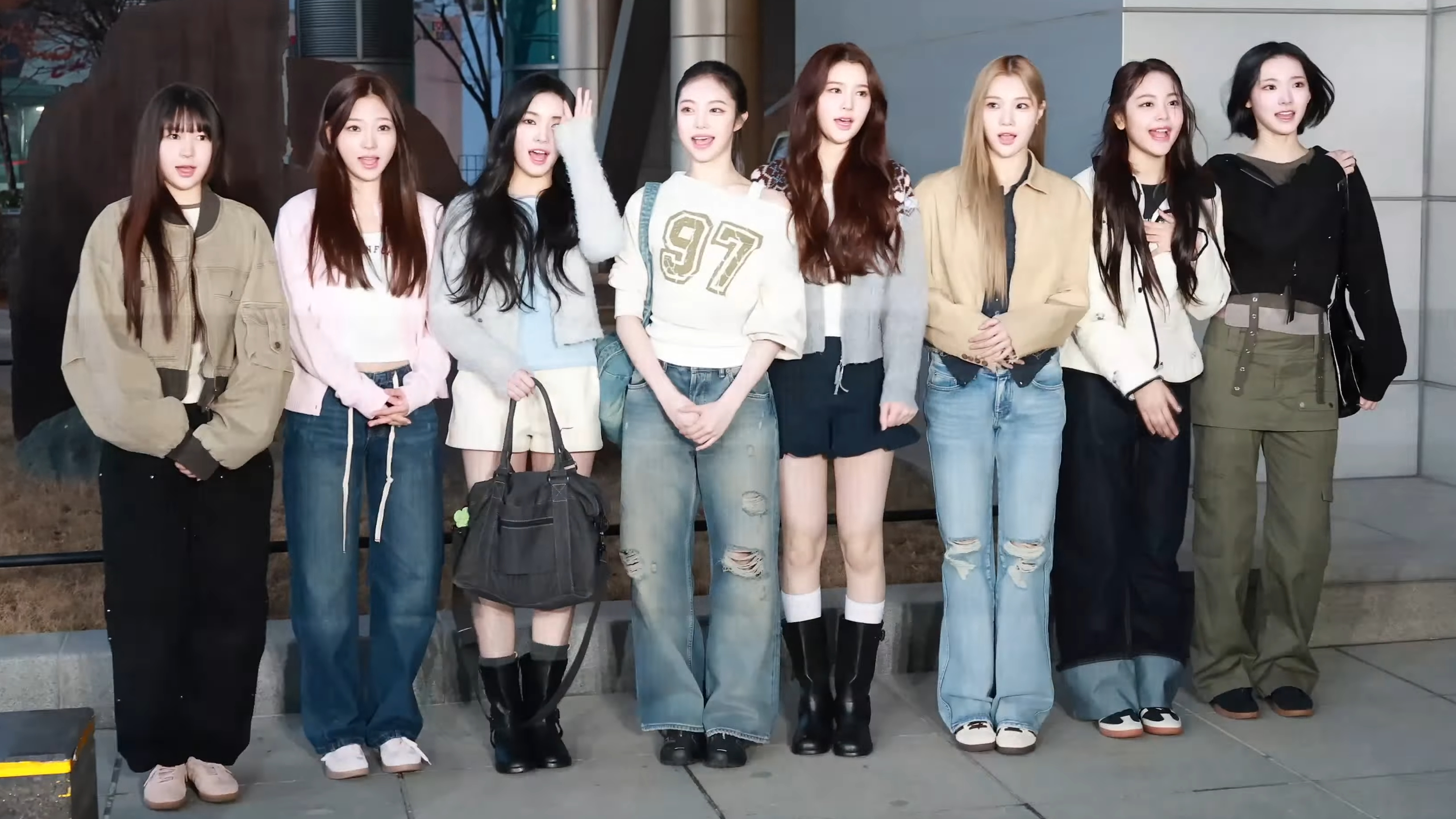
Hearts2Hearts in March 2025

On January 31, 2025, Hearts2Hearts's Instagram account was opened to the public, which unveiled a series of images, giving a sneak peek of the members. All members were revealed on February 3 through a video titled "Chase Your Choice" released on SM's official YouTube channel, and additional social media accounts were opened. On February 24, Hearts2Hearts released their debut single album titled The Chase which contains the lead single of the same name and a B-side titled "Butterflies". A debut showcase for the group was held at the Yes24 Music Hall in Seoul on the same day. The group won their first music broadcast trophy with "The Chase" on March 11, 15 days after their debut, on The Show. The song reached number 21 on South Korea's singles chart, while the single album has been certified Platinum by the KMCA.

On June 18, the group released the digital single "Style", which peaked at number 17. On October 20, Hearts2Hearts released their first EP Focus, after having released the track "Pretty Please" as a pre-release single on September 24. The EP and its titular lead single earned the group new peaks at number 3 on the albums chart and number 14 on the singles chart respectively. "Pretty Please" later served as a promotional track in South Korea for Pokémon Legends: Z-A. Hearts2Hearts was named one of 2025's best new artists at various South Korean year-end award ceremonies, including the MAMA Awards, Melon Music Awards and Seoul Music Awards.

On February 20, 2026, Hearts2Hearts released a digital single titled "Rude!". After the song's spoken interlude went viral, it became the group's first number one single in South Korea. A Japanese version of the song was later released on March 27. On June 22, the group released their second EP, Lemon Tang, alongside the lead single of same name. The EP has become their highest-charting album domestically at number 2. On August 12, Hearts2Hearts made their debut in Japan with the single "Iconic Heart", which peaked at number 2 on the Oricon Singles Chart and the Billboard Japan Hot 100.

== Other ventures ==
=== Ambassadorship ===
In April 2025, Hearts2Hearts was chosen as the Seoul Spring Festa 2025 Wonder Show's honorary ambassador. On June 17, the group was selected as Seoul City's public relations ambassador. On July 1, 2026, the Supreme Prosecutors' Office of the Republic of Korea officially appointed Hearts2Hearts as Youth Drug Prevention's promotional ambassador.

=== Endorsements ===
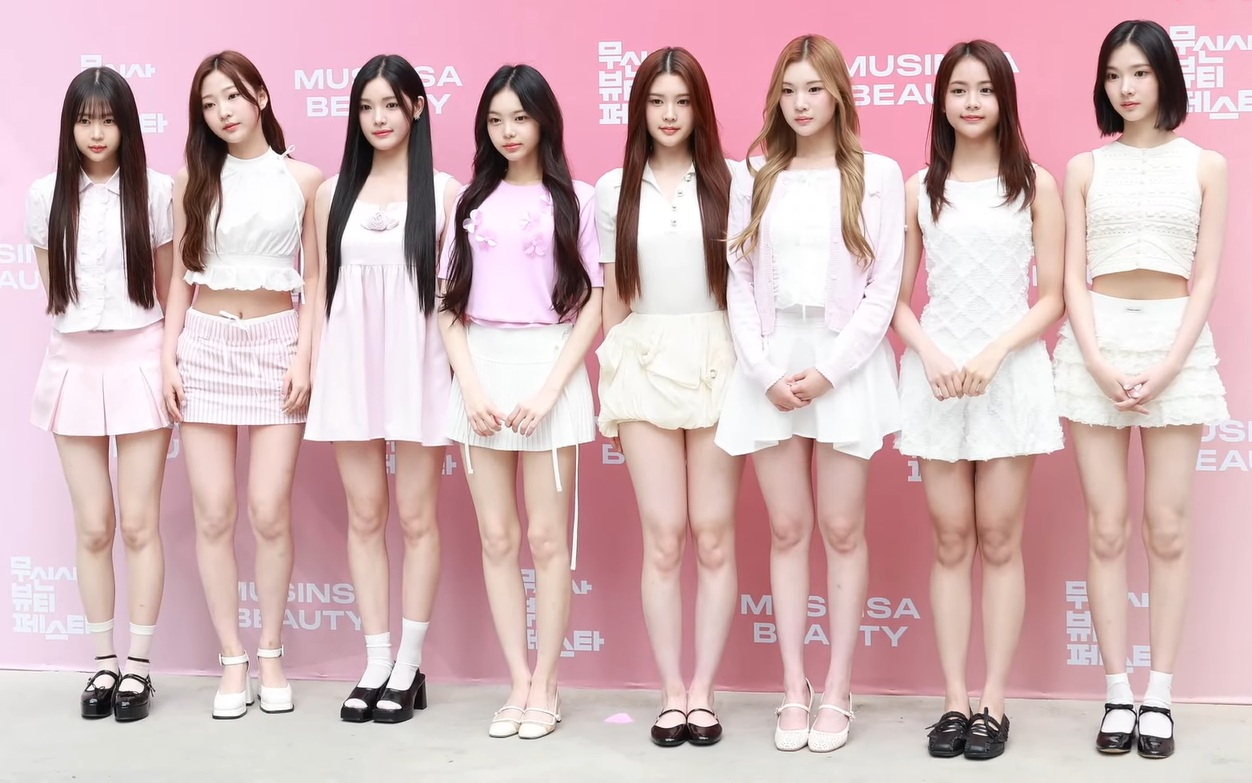
Hearts2Hearts at an event for Musinsa Beauty in 2025

In February 2025, SM Entertainment and SAMG Entertainment announced a collaboration with Hearts2Hearts and Catch! Teenieping. On February 24, it was announced that Hearts2Hearts will be part of "SMGC" project campaign, a collaboration between SM and Mega MGC Coffee. Later on that day, Hearts2Hearts were selected as campaign models for the women's spring special exhibition at Musinsa, the largest fashion platform in Korea. In June, the group was featured on the digital cover of W Korea, in collaboration with Chanel Beauty. On June 9, Hearts2Hearts became the brand ambassador for the beauty product Scarlett. On June 10, Binggrae has selected Hearts2Hearts as advertising models. On June 19, it was announced that Converse has launched a new 2025 Fall season campaign with the group. In July, the group collaborated with the beauty product Barenbliss. On July 21, it was announced that Hearts2Hearts became the brand model of the beauty product 2aN. On August 11, through their Instagram social media account, Kookmin Bank announced Hearts2Hearts as their new promotional model. On August 25, Shopee Indonesia, the number one e-commerce in Southeast Asia, chose Hearts2Hearts as its brand ambassador. On September 12, global lifestyle brand Calvin Klein selected Hearts2Hearts as its promotional models for the Fall/Winter season. On October 21, Lily Brown, a global fashion brand based in Japan, announced Hearts2Hearts as the promotional model for its Winter 2025 collection.

On January 7, 2026, through several social media accounts, Lotte Duty Free announced Hearts2Hearts as one of its new promotional models. On April 28, Japanese beauty brand Sorule chose Hearts2Hearts as its new muse. On May 9, Kia Indonesia announced a promotional collaboration with Hearts2Hearts entitled "Kia x Hearts2House" and was announced as its brand ambassador. On May 16, Joyday Ice Cream announced Hearts2Hearts as brand ambassadors via its Instagram account. On July 29, Hearts2Hearts was announced as the brand ambassador of JetZ snack. On August 29, via their Instagram social media account, Popspageti by Indomie announced Hearts2Hearts as their latest brand ambassadors. On September 21, Clalen, a renowned South Korean contact lens brand, officially announced Hearts2Hearts as its brand models. In October, SM Entertainment announced the Hearts2Hearts collaboration with the MOBA game 'Arena of Valor' developed by Tencent Games and Garena in commemoration of the 10th anniversary of its launch, along with the release of the single 'Next Chapter' on the 16th. Then, in the same month, Lotte Chilsung Beverage selected Hearts2Hearts as the new advertising models for its carbonated drink, 'Chilsung Cider RICH.'

=== Philanthropy ===
On February 23, 2026, Hearts2Hearts donated 50 million won under the name of their official fan club to the G-Foundation, to support vulnerable female adolescents in South Korea, as they marked their first anniversary.

== Members ==
- Carmen (카르멘)
- Jiwoo (지우) – leader
- Yuha (유하)
- Stella (스텔라)
- Juun (주은)
- A-na (에이나)
- Ian (이안)
- Ye-on (예온)

== Discography ==
=== Extended plays ===
List of extended plays, showing selected details, selected chart positions, sales figures, and certifications
Title	Details	Peak chart positions		Sales	Certifications
Title	Details	KOR	JPN	Sales	Certifications
Focus	Released: October 20, 2025; Label: SM; Formats: CD, digital download, streaming	4	13	KOR: 482,388; JPN: 10,257	KMCA: Platinum
Lemon Tang	Released: June 22, 2026; Label: SM; Formats: CD, digital download, streaming	2	11	KOR: 743,646; JPN: 9,156	KMCA: 2× Platinum

=== Single albums ===
List of single albums, showing selected details, selected chart positions, sales figures, and certifications
Title	Details	Peak chart positions	Sales	Certifications
Title	Details	KOR	Sales	Certifications
The Chase	Released: February 24, 2025; Label: SM; Formats: CD, digital download, streaming	3	KOR: 432,217	KMCA: Platinum

=== Singles ===
==== Korean singles ====
List of Korean singles, showing year released, selected chart positions, and name of the album
Title	Year	Peak chart positions									Album
Title	Year	KOR	HK	IDN	JPN Hot	NZ Hot	SGP	TWN	US World	WW	Album
"The Chase"	2025	21	—	11	—	—	— (Note: "The Chase" not enter the Official Singapore Chart, but peaked at number 28 on the Official Singapore Regional Chart.)	—	9	— (Note: "The Chase" did not enter the Billboard Global 200, but peaked at number 102 on the Billboard Global Excl. US.)	The Chase
"Style"	2025	17	—	15	79	—	—	—	—	— (Note: "Style" did not enter the Billboard Global 200, but peaked at number 130 on the Billboard Global Excl. US.)	Non-album single
"Pretty Please"	2025	95	—	—	—	—	—	—	—	—	Focus
"Focus"	2025	14	—	—	100	—	—	—	—	— (Note: "Focus" did not enter the Billboard Global 200, but peaked at number 165 on the Billboard Global Excl. US.)	Focus
"Rude!"	2026	1	12	13	19	16	15	2	10	57	Lemon Tang
"Lemon Tang"	2026	7	—	—	99	—	—	—	—	— (Note: "Lemon Tang" did not enter the Billboard Global 200, but peaked at number 181 on the Billboard Global Excl. US.)	Lemon Tang
"Iconic Heart" (Korean version)	2026	150	—	—	—	—	—	—	—	—	Non-album single
"—" denotes releases that did not chart or were not released in that region.

==== Japanese singles ====
List of Japanese singles, showing year released, selected chart positions, sales figures, and name of the album
Title	Year	Peak chart positions			Sales	Album
Title	Year	KOR	JPN	JPN Hot	Sales	Album
"Iconic Heart"	2026	110	2	2	JPN: 49,770	Non-album single

==== Promotional singles ====
List of promotional singles, showing year released, selected chart positions, and name of the album
Title	Year	Peak chart positions	Album
Title	Year	KOR	Album
"Moonride"	2026	151	Non-album singles
"Next Chapter"	2026	— (Note: "Next Chapter" did not enter the Circle Digital Chart, but peaked at number 59 on the component Download Chart.)	Non-album singles
"—" denotes releases that did not chart or were not released in that region.

=== Other charted songs ===
List of other charted songs, showing year released, selected chart positions, and name of the album
Title	Year	Peak chart positions	Album
Title	Year	KOR DL	Album
"Butterflies"	2025	39	The Chase
"Apple Pie"	2025	48	Focus
"Flutter"	2025	76	Focus
"Blue Moon"	2025	77	Focus
"15-Love"	2026	25	Lemon Tang
"Baby Steps"	2026	24	Lemon Tang
"Heart Emoji"	2026	28	Lemon Tang
"Secret Recipe"	2026	27	Lemon Tang

== Videography ==
=== Music videos ===
Title	Year	Director(s)	Ref.
"The Chase"	2025	Rima Yoon (Rigend Film)	
"Butterflies"	2025	Shin Dongle	
"Style"	2025	Shin Hee-won	
"Pretty Please"	2025	Annie Chung (Lifeimagesfilm)	
"Focus"	2025	Samson (Highqualityfish)	
"Rude!"	2026	Lee Youngeum (00)	
"Lemon Tang"	2026	Seo Ki-woong (Line of Sight)	
"Iconic Heart"	2026	Lee Youngeum (00)	
"Moonride"	2026	Unknown	
"Next Chapter"	2026	Unknown	
"Iconic Heart" (Korean version)	2026	Unknown	

== Filmography ==
=== Web shows ===
Year	Title	Notes	Ref.
2025	Chat Hearts2Hearts	Reality show	
2026	Iconic Power Race	Reality show	

== Live performances ==
=== Fan meetings and showcase tour ===
Event name	Date	City	Country	Venue	Ref.
Hearts2House 2026	February 21–22, 2026	Seoul	South Korea	Olympic Hall	
Hearts2House 2026	March 19, 2026	Brooklyn, New York	United States	Brooklyn Paramount	
Hearts2House 2026	March 22, 2026	Los Angeles	United States	The Wiltern	
Hearts2House 2026	March 28, 2026	Jakarta	Indonesia	Tennis Indoor Senayan	

=== SM Town Live ===
List of SMTown concert tours participated by Hearts2Hearts, showing dates, locations and relevant details
Title	Date	City	Country	Venue	Attendance	Ref.
SM Town Live 2025–2026: The Culture, the Future	May 9, 2025	Mexico City	Mexico	Estadio GNP Seguros	50,000	
SM Town Live 2025–2026: The Culture, the Future	May 11, 2025	Los Angeles	United States	Dignity Health Sports Park	—	
SM Town Live 2025–2026: The Culture, the Future	June 28, 2025	London	United Kingdom	The O2 Arena (Note: The venue for this show was initially Allianz Stadium Twickenham.)	—	
SM Town Live 2025–2026: The Culture, the Future	August 9, 2025	Tokyo	Japan	Tokyo Dome	95,000	
SM Town Live 2025–2026: The Culture, the Future	January 31, 2026	Fukuoka	Japan	Mizuho Paypay Dome	70,000	
SM Town Live 2025–2026: The Culture, the Future	February 14, 2026	Bangkok	Thailand	Rajamangala Stadium	—	

=== Showcases ===
Title	Date	Associated album(s)	Location	Venue	Song(s) played	Ref.
Chase Our Hearts	February 24, 2025	The Chase	Seoul, South Korea	Yes24 Live Hall	"The Chase"; "Butterflies"	
Focus	October 20, 2025	Focus	Seoul, South Korea	Blue Square SOL Travel Hall	"Focus"; "Style"; "Pretty Please"	
Lemon Tang	June 22, 2026	Lemon Tang	Seoul, South Korea	Blue Square WooriWON Banking Hall	"Lemon Tang"; "Rude!"	

=== Joint tours, concerts, and music festivals ===
Event	Date	Country	Venue	Ref.
APEC Music Festa	October 10, 2025	South Korea	Gyeongju Civic Stadium	
Busan One Asia Festival	June 11, 2025	South Korea	Busan Exhibition and Convention Center	
iHeartRadio KIIS FM Wango Tango	May 10, 2025	United States	Huntington Beach	
K-Expo Inkigayo	June 17, 2026	France	Palais des Congres des Paris	
KB Joy Allpak Festival	September 21, 2025	South Korea	Olympic Park Seoul	
KBS Seoul Spring Festa	April 30, 2025	South Korea	Seoul World Cup Stadium	
KCON	May 8, 2026	Japan	Makuhari Messe	
LaLaLa Festival	August 24, 2025	Indonesia	Jakarta International Expo	
MBC Show! Music Core Live	July 5, 2025	Japan	Belluna Dome	
Mcountdown x Mega Concert	June 1, 2026	South Korea	Inspire Arena	
Mezamashi WANGAN Fest	August 14, 2026	Japan	Ariake Arena	
Music Bank Global Festival	December 13, 2025	Japan	Tokyo National Stadium	
MyK Festa	June 19, 2025	South Korea	KSPO Dome	
NOL Festival	October 17, 2026	South Korea	KINTEX	
SBS Mega Concert	May 31, 2025	South Korea	Incheon Asiad Main Stadium	
TV Asahi: The Performance	March 30, 2025	Japan	K-Arena Yokohama	
TV Asahi: The Performance	April 12, 2026	Japan	K-Arena Yokohama	

=== Awards shows ===
Event	Date	Venue	City	Country	Performed song(s)	Ref.
2nd Asia Star Entertainer Awards	May 28, 2025	K-Arena Yokohama	Yokohama	Japan	"The Chase" and "Butterflies"	
34th Seoul Music Awards	June 21, 2025	Inspire Arena	Incheon	South Korea	"The Chase"	
8th K-World Dream Awards	August 21, 2025	Jamsil Indoor Gymnasium	Seoul	South Korea	"Style"	
1st TMElive International Music Awards	August 22, 2025	Macao Galaxy Arena	Macao	China	"The Chase", "Style", and "Gee" (cover)	
8th The Fact Music Awards	September 20, 2025	Macao Outdoor Performance Venue	Macao	China	"Style" and "Red Flavor" (cover)	
2nd Korea Grand Music Awards	November 15, 2025	Inspire Arena	Incheon	South Korea	"Focus"	
27th MAMA Awards	November 28, 2025	Kai Tak Stadium	Hong Kong	China	"Focus"	
17th Melon Music Awards	December 20, 2025	Gocheok Sky Dome	Seoul	South Korea	"The Chase" and "Focus"	
33rd Hanteo Music Awards	February 15, 2026	KSPO Dome	Seoul	South Korea	"Style"	
3rd Asia Star Entertainer Awards	May 18, 2026	Belluna Dome	Saitama	Japan	"Focus" and "Rude!"	
35th Seoul Music Awards	June 20, 2026	Inspire Arena	Incheon	South Korea	"Focus" and "Rude!"	
2026 KM Chart Awards	July 25, 2026	Hwajeong Gymnasium Korea University	Seoul	South Korea	"Rude!" and "Lemon Tang"	
2nd TMElive International Music Awards	August 22, 2026	Kai Tak Stadium	Hong Kong	China	"Focus", "Rude!", "Style", and "Lemon Tang"	
9th K-World Dream Awards	August 27, 2026	KINTEX	Seoul	South Korea	"Rude!"	
3rd Korea Grand Music Awards	November 8, 2026	Gocheok Sky Dome	Seoul	South Korea	"Rude!"	
18th Melon Music Awards	November 14, 2026	Gocheok Sky Dome	Seoul	South Korea	"15-Love" and "Rude!"	

=== Television specials ===
Event	Date	Country	Venue	Ref.
KBS2 Gag Concert	October 26, 2025	South Korea	—	
MBC Gayo Daejejeon	December 31, 2025	South Korea	Iesan MBC Dream Center Open Hall	
SBS Gayo Daejeon Summer	July 27, 2025	South Korea	KINTEX	
SBS Gayo Daejeon Summer	August 9, 2026	South Korea	KINTEX	
SBS Gayo Daejeon Winter	December 25, 2025	South Korea	Inspire Arena	
Spotify Wrapped Live	December 4, 2025	Indonesia	RCTI Studio	

=== Other live performances ===
Event	Date	Country	Venue	Ref.
Arena of the Decade: RoV Pro League Winter	October 23, 2026	Thailand	IMPACT Exhibition Hall	
Global Spin Live	March 23, 2026	United States	The Grammy Museum	
Rakuten GirlsAward Spring/Summer	May 3, 2025	Japan	Yoyogi National Gymnasium	
Spotify Closer	October 2, 2026	South Korea	Myeonghwa Live Hall	
Tokyo Girls Collection	July 18, 2026	Japan	Toki Messe Niigata Convention Center	
Tokyo Girls Collection	August 16, 2026	Japan	Ehime Prefectural Budokan	
Tokyo Girls Collection	September 19, 2026	Japan	Yokohama Arena	

Cancelled dates
Event	Date	Country	Venue	Reason	Ref.
Indonesian Television Awards	September 7, 2026	Indonesia	RCTI Studio	Flights cancelled due to the Krakatoa eruption	

== Accolades ==
=== Awards and nominations ===
Name of the award ceremony, year presented, category, nominee of the award, and the result of the nomination
Award ceremony	Year	Category	Nominee / work	Result	Ref.
Asia Star Entertainer Awards	2025	The Best New Artist	Hearts2Hearts	Won	
Asia Star Entertainer Awards	2026	The Platinum (Bonsang)	Hearts2Hearts	Won	
Asia Star Entertainer Awards	2026	Best Group (Female)	Hearts2Hearts	Won	
Asian Pop Music Awards	2025	Best New Artist	"The Chase"	Nominated	
Brand Customer Loyalty Awards (Note: Co-organized by the Korean Customers Council and Brand Keys, this event recognizes the most influential brands in society and culture, as determined through consumer research.)	2025	Female Rookie Idol	Hearts2Hearts	Nominated	
Brand Customer Loyalty Awards	2026	Hot Trend Female Idol	Hearts2Hearts	Won	
Brand of the Year Awards (Note: It is a large-scale brand award that selects and awards the best brands that shined in the year through direct consumer voting.)	2025	Female Idol Rising Star – Indonesia	Hearts2Hearts	Won	
Brand of the Year Awards	2025	Female Rookie Idol	Hearts2Hearts	Won	
Brand of the Year Awards	2026	Female Idol	Hearts2Hearts	Won	
Brand of the Year Awards	2026	Female Idol - Vietnam	Hearts2Hearts	Won	
Brand of the Year Awards	2026	Hot Trend Female Idol - Indonesia	Hearts2Hearts	Won	
D Awards	2026	Dreams Silver Label	Hearts2Hearts	Won	
The Fact Music Awards	2025	Next Leader Award	Hearts2Hearts	Won	
Golden Disc Awards	2026	Digital Song Bonsang	"The Chase"	Nominated	
Golden Disc Awards	2026	Rookie Artist of the Year	Hearts2Hearts	Nominated	
Golden Disc Awards	2026	Most Popular Artist – Female	Hearts2Hearts	Won	
Hanteo Music Awards	2026	Rookie of the Year	Hearts2Hearts	Won	
Hanteo Music Awards	2026	Artist of the Year (Bonsang)	Hearts2Hearts	Nominated	
Hanteo Music Awards	2026	Global Artist – Africa	Hearts2Hearts	Nominated	
Hanteo Music Awards	2026	Global Artist – Asia	Hearts2Hearts	Nominated	
Hanteo Music Awards	2026	Global Artist – Europe	Hearts2Hearts	Nominated	
Hanteo Music Awards	2026	Global Artist – North America	Hearts2Hearts	Nominated	
Hanteo Music Awards	2026	Global Artist – Oceania	Hearts2Hearts	Nominated	
Hanteo Music Awards	2026	Global Artist – South America	Hearts2Hearts	Nominated	
Hanteo Music Awards	2026	Whosfandom Award	Hearts2Hearts	Nominated	
Hanteo Music Awards	2026	Best Popular Artist	Hearts2Hearts	Nominated	
Hanteo Music Awards	2026	Best Global Popular Artist	Hearts2Hearts	Nominated	
Hanteo Music Awards	2026	Best Artist Pick – Female	Hearts2Hearts	Won	
iHeartRadio Music Awards	2026	Best New Artist (K-pop)	Hearts2Hearts	Nominated	
K-World Dream Awards	2025	Super Rookie Award	Hearts2Hearts	Won	
K-World Dream Awards	2026	Global Music Artist Award	Hearts2Hearts	Won	
K-World Dream Awards	2026	K- World Dream Artist Award	Hearts2Hearts	Won	
KM Chart Awards (Note: Hosted by KM Chart World and organized by MyDaily. KM Chart Awards (previously called the Universal Superstar Awards) is the annual settlement awards of KM Chart and is a global award ceremony that selects and awards artists loved by the world's public and fans through K-Music.)	2026	Best Female Group	Hearts2Hearts	Won	
KM Chart Awards	2026	Ultimate 12 (Bonsang)	Hearts2Hearts	Won	
Korea First Brand Awards (Note: The Korea First Brand Awards is hosted by the Korea Consumer Brand Committee and the Korea Consumer Forum. Awards are based on a nationwide survey held in South Korea.)	2026	Female Rookie Idol	Hearts2Hearts	Won	
Korea First Brand Awards	2026	Female Rookie Idol (Indonesia)	Hearts2Hearts	Won	
Korea First Brand Awards	2026	Female Rookie Idol (Vietnam)	Hearts2Hearts	Won	
Korea Grand Music Awards	2025	IS Rising Star	Hearts2Hearts	Won	
Korea Grand Music Awards	2025	Best 10 Music	"Style"	Nominated	
Korea Grand Music Awards	2025	Best Popularity – Music Day	Hearts2Hearts	Nominated	
Korea Grand Music Awards	2025	BIGC Global Star Award	Hearts2Hearts	Nominated	
Korea Grand Music Awards	2026	Global Hot Star	Hearts2Hearts	Won	
Korea Grand Music Awards	2026	Best Music (Bonsang)	Hearts2Hearts	Won	
Korean Music Awards	2026	Best K-pop Song	"Focus"	Nominated	
MAMA Awards	2025	Best New Artist	Hearts2Hearts	Won	
MAMA Awards	2025	Fans' Choice Top 10 – Female	Hearts2Hearts	Won	
MAMA Awards	2025	Olive Young K-Beauty Artist	Hearts2Hearts	Won	
MAMA Awards	2025	Artist of the Year	Hearts2Hearts	Longlisted	
MAMA Awards	2025	Fans' Choice of the Year	Hearts2Hearts	Longlisted	
MAMA Awards	2026	Best Female Group	Hearts2Hearts	Pending	
MAMA Awards	2026	Best Dance Performance Female Group	"Rude!"	Pending	
MAMA Awards	2026	Best Song Top 10	"Rude!"	Pending	
MAMA Awards	2026	Song of the Year	"Rude!"	Pending	
MAMA Awards	2026	Artist of the Year	Hearts2Hearts	Pending	
MAMA Awards	2026	Fans' Choice of the Year	Hearts2Hearts	Pending	
MAMA Awards	2026	Fans' Choice Top 10 – Female	Hearts2Hearts	Pending	
Melon Music Awards	2025	Berriz Global Fans' Choice	Hearts2Hearts	Won	
Melon Music Awards	2025	New Artist of the Year	Hearts2Hearts	Won	
Melon Music Awards	2025	Best Female Group	Hearts2Hearts	Nominated	
Melon Music Awards	2025	Top 10 Artist	Hearts2Hearts	Nominated	
Melon Music Awards	2026	Global Impact Artist	Hearts2Hearts	Won	
Melon Music Awards	2026	Global Top 10	Hearts2Hearts	Won	
Melon Music Awards	2026	Top 10	Hearts2Hearts	Won	
Melon Music Awards	2026	Artist of the Year (Daesang)	Hearts2Hearts	Longlisted	
Melon Music Awards	2026	Song of the Year (Daesang)	"Rude!"	Nominated	
Melon Music Awards	2026	Best Group - Female	Hearts2Hearts	Nominated	
Melon Music Awards	2026	Kakao Bank Everyone's Star	Hearts2Hearts	Nominated	
Seoul Music Awards	2025	Rookie of the Year	Hearts2Hearts	Won	
Seoul Music Awards	2026	Main Prize (Bonsang)	Hearts2Hearts	Won	
Seoul Music Awards	2026	Popularity Award	Hearts2Hearts	Nominated	
Seoul Music Awards	2026	K-pop World Choice - Group	Hearts2Hearts	Nominated	
TMElive International Music Awards	2026	Rising International Group Award	Hearts2Hearts	Won	
Weibo International Entertainment Awards	2026	New Force Overseas Group of the Year	Hearts2Hearts	Won	

=== Listicles ===
Name of publisher, year listed, name of listicle, and placement
Publisher	Year	Listicle	Placement	Ref.
Forbes Korea	2025	K-Idol of the Year 30	23rd	
NME	2026	The NME 100	Placed	
