= The Chase (single album) =

- Digital cover

Single album by Hearts2Hearts
- Released: February 24, 2025
- Length: 5:56
- Language: Korean
- Labels: SM; Kakao

Hearts2Hearts chronology
The Chase (2025)	Focus (2025)

Singles from The Chase
- 1. "The Chase" Released: February 24, 2025

The Chase is the debut single album by South Korean girl group Hearts2Hearts. It was released on February 24, 2025, by SM Entertainment, containing two tracks, including the lead single of the same name.

== Background and release ==
On February 3, 2023, SM Entertainment announced in its corporate strategy, SM 3.0, that it would be debuting a new girl group. On May 24, it was announced that the girl group would debut in the fourth quarter of 2023; however, after that timeframe was not met, a revised schedule was announced on November 5, 2024, with the debut now set for the first quarter of 2025. Then, on January 12, 2025, the group's name was revealed as Hearts2Hearts in a surprise trailer shown at the end of SM's 30th-anniversary SM Town Live 2025 concert.

On February 3, 2025, SM Entertainment announced that Hearts2Hearts's debut single album, The Chase, would be released on February 24, 2025, alongside the lead single of the same name. The following day, a character clip and the promotional schedule were revealed. On February 13, teaser videos featuring individual members were released, followed by a mood sampler video two days later. On February 23, the music video teaser for "The Chase" was released. The single album was released alongside the music video for "The Chase" on February 24.

== Composition ==
The Chase contains two tracks. The lead single, "The Chase", is described as a synth-pop song, inspired by Lewis Carroll's "Alice in Wonderland". It features "dynamic progression underpinned by bass synth" and lyrics that convey "a confident message about forging one's own path, along with the excitement and curiosity of exploring a new world". The second and final track, "Butterflies", is described as a mid-tempo R&B song characterized by a "deep bassline and guitar melodies".

== Promotion ==
Prior to the release of The Chase, on February 24, 2025, Hearts2Hearts held a live event called "Hearts2Hearts Debut Fan Showcase <Chase Our Hearts>" on YouTube and Weverse, aimed at introducing the single album and connecting with their fanbase.

== Track listing ==
The Chase track listing
No.	Title	Lyrics	Music	Arrangement	Length
1.	"The Chase"	Kenzie	Kenzie; No2zcat; Lauren Faith; Hannah Yadi; Jorja Douglas; Renée Downer; Stella Quaresma	Kenzie; No2zcat; Faith	2:59
2.	"Butterflies"	Almeng (XYXX); Kang Eun-jeong	Amanda Thomsen; Daniel Michael Victor; Rasmus Gregersen	DMV & Ras	2:57
Total length:					5:56

== Credits and personnel ==
Credits adapted from the single album's liner notes.

Studio

- SM LVYIN Studio – recording, digital editing, engineered for mix (track 1)
- SM Dorii Studio – recording, digital editing (track 1)
- SM Yellow Tail Studio – recording (all tracks), digital editing, engineered for mix (track 2)
- SM Blue Ocean Studio – mixing (track 1)
- SM Concert Hall Studio – mixing (track 2)
- Sterling Sound – mastering (all tracks)

Personnel

- SM Entertainment – executive producer
- Hearts2Hearts – vocals (all tracks)
- Kenzie – producer, lyrics, composition, arrangement, vocal directing (track 1)
- No2zcat – producer, composition, arrangement (track 1)
- Lauren Faith – composition, arrangement (track 1)
- Hannah Yadi – composition (track 1)
- Jorja Douglas – composition (track 1)
- Renée Downer – composition (track 1)
- Stella Quaresma – composition (track 1)
- Almeng (XYXX) – lyrics (track 2)
- Kang Eun-jeong – lyrics (track 2)
- Amanda Thomsen – composition, background vocals (track 2)
- Daniel Michael Victor a.k.a. DMV (DMV & Ras) – producer, composition, arrangement (track 2)
- Rasmus Gregersen a.k.a. Ras (DMV & Ras) – producer, composition, arrangement (track 2)
- Jang Jin-young – vocal directing (all tracks)
- Jsong – vocal directing (track 2), background vocals (all tracks)
- Kim Yoo-hyun – guitar (track 1)
- Lee Ji-hong – recording, digital editing, engineered for mix (track 1)
- Jeong Jae-won – recording, digital editing (track 1)
- Noh Min-ji – recording (all tracks), digital editing, engineered for mix (track 2)
- Kim Cheol-sun – mixing (track 1)
- Nam Koong-jin – mixing (track 2)
- Chris Gehringer – mastering (all tracks)

== Charts ==
=== Weekly charts ===
Weekly chart performance for The Chase
Chart (2025)	Peak position
Japan (Oricon)	15
Japan Top Singles Sales (Billboard Japan)	20
South Korean Albums (Circle)	3

=== Monthly charts ===
Monthly chart performance for The Chase
Chart (2025)	Position
South Korean Albums (Circle)	6

=== Year-end charts ===
Year-end chart performance for The Chase
Chart (2025)	Position
South Korean Albums (Circle)	60

== Certifications ==
Certifications for The Chase
Region	Certification	Certified units/sales
South Korea (KMCA)	Platinum	250,000^{^}
^{^} Shipments figures based on certification alone.

== Release history ==
Release history for The Chase
Region	Date	Format	Label
South Korea	February 24, 2025	CD	SM; Kakao
Various	February 24, 2025	Digital download; streaming	SM; Kakao
