= The Chase (Hearts2Hearts song) =

Single by Hearts2Hearts

from the album The Chase
- Language: Korean
- Released: February 24, 2025
- Genre: Synth-pop
- Length: 2:59
- Label: SM; Kakao
- Composers: Lauren Faith; Renée Downer; Hannah Yadi; Jorja Douglas; Kenzie; Stella Quaresma; No2zcat
- Lyricist: Kenzie
- Producers: Kenzie; No2zcat

Hearts2Hearts singles chronology
"The Chase" (2025)	"Style" (2025)

Music video
- "The Chase" on YouTube

Professional ratings
Review scores
Source	Rating
IZM	3/5 stars

"The Chase" is a song recorded by South Korean girl group Hearts2Hearts for their debut single album of the same name. Written by Kenzie, Lauren Faith, No2zcat, Hannah Yadi, Jorja Douglas, Renée Downer, and Stella Quaresma, it was released as the album's lead single on February 24, 2025, by SM Entertainment.

== Background and release ==
On February 3, 2023, SM Entertainment announced in its corporate strategy, SM 3.0, that it would be debuting a new girl group. On May 24, it was announced that the girl group would debut in the fourth quarter of 2023; however, after that timeframe was not met, a revised schedule was announced on November 5, 2024, with the debut now set for the first quarter of 2025. Then, on January 12, 2025, the group's name was revealed as Hearts2Hearts in a surprise trailer shown at the end of SM's 30th-anniversary SM Town Live 2025 concert.

On February 3, 2025, SM Entertainment announced that Hearts2Hearts's debut single album, The Chase, would be released on February 24, 2025, alongside the lead single of the same name. On February 23, the music video teaser was released. The song was released alongside the single album and its music video on February 24.

== Composition ==
"The Chase" was written, composed, and arranged by Kenzie, with additional composition and arrangement contributions from Lauren Faith and No2zcat. Hannah Yadi, Jorja Douglas, Renée Downer, and Stella Quaresma also contributed to the composition, while Kenzie and No2zcat produced the track. Described as a synth-pop song, and inspired by Lewis Carroll's Alice in Wonderland, it features "dynamic progression underpinned by bass synth" and lyrics that convey "a confident message about forging one's own path, along with the excitement and curiosity of exploring a new world".

== Promotion ==
Prior to the release of The Chase, on February 24, 2025, Hearts2Hearts held a live event called "Hearts2Hearts Debut Fan Showcase <Chase Our Hearts>" on YouTube and Weverse, aimed at introducing the single album, including "The Chase", and connecting with their fanbase. The group subsequently performed the song at four music programs: Mnet's M Countdown on February 27, and KBS's Music Bank on February 28, MBC's Show! Music Core on March 1, and SBS's Inkigayo on March 2.

== Accolades ==
Awards and nominations for "The Chase"
Awards	Year	Category	Result	Ref.
Asian Pop Music Awards	2025	Best New Artist	Nominated	
Golden Disc Awards	2026	Digital Song Bonsang	Nominated	

Music program awards for "The Chase"
Program	Date	Ref.
The Show	March 11, 2025	

"The Chase" on listicles
Critic/Publication	List	Rank	Ref.
Rolling Stone India	The 25 best K-pop songs of 2025	16	

== Credits and personnel ==
Credits adapted from the single album's liner notes.

Studio

- SM LVYIN Studio – recording, digital editing, engineered for mix
- SM Dorii Studio – recording, digital editing
- SM Yellow Tail Studio – recording
- SM Blue Ocean Studio – mixing
- Sterling Sound – mastering

Personnel

- SM Entertainment – executive producer
- Hearts2Hearts – vocals
- Kenzie – producer, lyrics, composition, arrangement, vocal directing
- No2zcat – producer, composition, arrangement
- Lauren Faith – composition, arrangement
- Hannah Yadi – composition
- Jorja Douglas – composition
- Renée Downer – composition
- Stella Quaresma – composition
- Jang Jin-young – vocal directing
- Jsong – background vocals
- Kim Yoo-hyun – guitar
- Lee Ji-hong – recording, digital editing, engineered for mix
- Jeong Jae-won – recording, digital editing
- Noh Min-ji – recording
- Kim Cheol-sun – mixing
- Chris Gehringer – mastering

== Charts ==
=== Weekly charts ===
Weekly chart performance for "The Chase"
Chart (2025)	Peak position
China (TME Korean)	16
Global Excl. US (Billboard)	102
Indonesia (IFPI)	11
Japan Heatseekers (Billboard Japan)	6
Singapore Regional (RIAS)	28
South Korea (Circle)	21
US World Digital Song Sales (Billboard)	9

=== Monthly charts ===
Monthly chart performance for "The Chase"
Chart (2025)	Position
South Korea (Circle)	25

=== Year-end charts ===
Year-end chart performance for "The Chase"
Chart (2025)	Position
South Korea (Circle)	71

== Release history ==
Release history for "The Chase"
Region	Date	Format	Label
Various	February 24, 2025	Digital download; streaming	SM; Kakao
