= Time of Our Life (song) =

Single by Day6

from the EP The Book of Us: Gravity
- Language: Korean
- Released: July 15, 2019
- Length: 3:28
- Label: JYP
- Composers: Young K; Jae; Sungjin; Wonpil; Hong Ji-sang
- Lyricist: Young K

Day6 singles chronology
"Days Gone by" (2018)	"Time of Our Life" (2019)	"Sweet Chaos" (2019)

Music video
- "Time of Our Life" on YouTube

"Time of Our Life" is a song recorded by South Korean boy band Day6 for their fifth extended play The Book of Us: Gravity. It was released as the EP's lead single by JYP Entertainment on July 15, 2019.

== Background and release ==
On July 1, JYP Entertainment announced that Day6 would have a comeback following their fan meeting the day before. The track list for the EP was released on the same day in which "Time of Our Life" was revealed to be the title track. Individual teaser images were released from July 6–10, followed by a group teaser image on July 11. The first music video teaser for the lead single "Time of Our Life" was released on July 12 and an album sampler was revealed the following day. On July 19, 2019, both "Time of Our Life" and their fifth EP The Book of Us: Gravity were released.

== Composition ==
"Time of Our Life" Is written by Young K and composed by Young K, Jae, Sungjin and Wonpil. It’s described as a song with a refreshing sound. It’s a song that contains the feelings you want to convey as a message at the beginning of the relationship. The song is composed in the key A-sharp Major and has 175 beats per minute and a running time of 3 minutes and 28 seconds.

== Promotion ==
Day6 held their first comeback stage for "Time of Our Life" on Mnet's M Countdown and promoted on several music programs in South Korea, including Music Bank, Show! Music Core and Inkigayo. They won their first ever music program win with "Time of Our Life" on July 24, 2019 on M Countdown.

== Accolades ==
Program	Date	Ref.
Show Champion (MBC Music)	July 24, 2019	
M Countdown (Mnet)	July 25, 2019	

== Certifications ==
Certifications for "Time of Our Life"
Region	Certification	Certified units/sales
Streaming
South Korea (KMCA)	2× Platinum	200,000,000^{†}
^{†} Streaming-only figures based on certification alone.

== Charts ==
=== Weekly charts ===
Weekly chart performance for "Time of Our Life"
Chart (2024)	Peak position
South Korea (Circle)	4
South Korea (K-pop Hot 100)	13

=== Monthly charts ===
Monthly chart performance for "Time of Our Life"
Chart (September 2024)	Peak position
South Korea (Circle)	5

=== Year-end charts ===
2023 year-end chart performance for "Time of Our Life"
Chart (2023)	Position
South Korea (Circle)	103

2024 year-end chart performance for "Time of Our Life"
Chart (2024)	Position
South Korea (Circle)	3

2025 year-end chart performance for "Time of Our Life"
Chart (2025)	Position
South Korea (Circle)	15

== Release history ==
Release history
Region	Date	Format	Label
Various	July 15, 2019	Digital download; streaming	JYP
