= Focus (Hearts2Hearts song) =

- Remixes cover

Single by Hearts2Hearts

from the EP Focus
- Language: Korean
- Released: October 20, 2025
- Genre: House
- Length: 2:57
- Label: SM; Kakao
- Composers: David Wilson; Michael Matosic; Dewain Whitmore; Hailey Collier
- Lyricist: Kenzie

Hearts2Hearts singles chronology
"Pretty Please" (2025)	"Focus" (2025)	"Rude!" (2026)

Music video
- "Focus" on YouTube

Professional ratings
Review scores
Source	Rating
IZM	3.5/5 stars

"Focus" is a song recorded by South Korean girl group Hearts2Hearts for their first extended play of the same name. Written by David Wilson, Michael Matosic, Dewain Whitmore and Hailey Collier, it was released as the EP's lead single by SM Entertainment on October 20, 2025.

== Background and release ==
On September 22, 2025, SM Entertainment announced that Hearts2Hearts would release their first extended play, Focus, on October 20, 2025. On October 17, the music video teaser was released.

== Composition ==
"Focus" is a house song featuring "vintage piano riff" and lyrics "sensually describing the state of being completely focused on the other person".

== Credits and personnel ==
Credits adapted from the EP's liner notes.

Studio

- SM Droplet Studio – recording
- SM Yellow Tail Studio – digital editing, engineered for mix
- SM Blue Cup Studio – mixing
- Sterling Sound – mastering

Personnel

- SM Entertainment – executive producer
- Hearts2Hearts – vocals
- Kenzie – lyrics
- David Wilson a.k.a. Dwilly – composition, arrangement
- Michael Matosic – composition, arrangement
- Dewain Whitmore – composition, background vocals
- Hailey Collier – composition
- Jsong – vocal directing, background vocals
- Kim Joo-hyun – recording
- Noh Min-ji – digital editing, engineered for mix
- Jung Eui-seok – mixing
- Chris Gehringer – mastering

== Accolades ==
Awards and nominations for "Focus"
Awards	Year	Category	Result	Ref.
Korean Music Awards	2026	Best K-pop Song	Nominated	

Music program awards for "Focus"
Program	Date	Ref.
The Show	October 28, 2025	

"Focus" on listicles
Publication	List	Rank	Ref.
Dazed	The 30 best K-pop tracks of 2025	16	
The Fader	The 51 best songs of 2025	11	
Idology	Top 20 Songs of 2025	Placed	
Teen Vogue	15 Best K-pop Music Videos of 2025	4	

== Charts ==
=== Weekly charts ===
Weekly chart performance for "Focus"
Chart (2025–26)	Peak position
China (TME Korean)	14
Global Excl. US (Billboard)	165
Japan (Japan Hot 100)	100
South Korea (Circle)	14
South Korea Hot 100 (Billboard)	36

=== Monthly charts ===
Monthly chart performance for "Focus"
Chart (2026)	Position
South Korea (Circle)	17

== Release history ==
Release history for "Focus"
Region	Date	Version	Format	Label
Various	October 20, 2025	Original	Digital download; streaming	SM; Kakao
Various	November 21, 2025	Remixes	Digital download; streaming	SM; ScreaM; Kakao
