= Style (Hearts2Hearts song) =

2025 single by Hearts2Hearts

Single by Hearts2Hearts
- Language: Korean
- Released: June 18, 2025
- Genre: Dance; Bubblegum pop
- Length: 3:30
- Label: SM; Kakao
- Composers: Mike Daly; Mitchell Owens; Adrian McKinnon; Sara Forsberg
- Lyricist: Kenzie

Hearts2Hearts singles chronology
"The Chase" (2025)	"Style" (2025)	"Pretty Please" (2025)

Music video
- "Style" on YouTube

"Style" is a song recorded by South Korean girl group Hearts2Hearts. Written by Mike Daly, Mitchell Owens, Adrian McKinnon and Sara Forsberg, it was released by SM Entertainment on June 18, 2025. Initially a standalone single, the song was later included on Hearts2Hearts's first extended play Focus, released on October 20, 2025.

== Background and release ==
On June 12, 2025, SM Entertainment announced that Hearts2Hearts would release the digital single, "Style", on June 18. Five days later, the music video teaser was released. The song was released alongside its music video on June 18.

== Composition ==
"Style" was written by Kenzie, composed and arranged by Mike Daly and Mitchell Owens with Adrian McKinnon and Sara Forsberg contributing to the composition. The song was described as uptempo dance song featuring "cheerful rhythm and groovy bass" with lyrics "expressing curiosity and ambiguous feelings toward someone with a seemingly indifferent yet firm style".

== Promotion ==
Hearts2Hearts performed the song on four music programs: Mnet's M Countdown on June 19, KBS's Music Bank on June 20, MBC's Show! Music Core on June 21, and SBS's Inkigayo on June 22.

== Credits and personnel ==
Credits adapted from Melon.

Studio

- SM Yellow Tail Studio – recording, digital editing, engineered for mix
- SM Aube Studio – recording
- SM Concert Hall Studio – mixing
- Klang Studio – mixing in Dolby Atmos
- Sterling Sound – mastering

Personnel

- Hearts2Hearts – vocals
- Jsong – background vocals, vocal directing
- Sara Forsberg – background vocals, composition
- Kenzie – lyrics
- Mike Daly – composition, arrangement
- Mitchell Owens – composition, arrangement
- Adrian McKinnon – composition
- Noh Min-ji – recording, digital editing, engineered for mix
- Kim Hyo-joon – recording
- Nam Koong-jin – mixing
- Koo Jong-pil – mixing in Dolby Atmos
- Chris Gehringer – mastering

== Accolades ==
Awards and nominations for "Style"
Awards	Year	Category	Result	Ref.
Korea Grand Music Awards	2025	Best 10 Music	Nominated	

"Style" on listicles
Critic/Publication	List	Rank	Ref.
Billboard	Best K-pop Songs of 2025: 25 Staff Picks	25	
The Hollywood Reporter	The 40 Best K-Pop Songs of 2025	32	
NME	The 25 best K-pop Songs of 2025	14	
PopMatters	The 15 best K-pop Songs of 2025	3	
TheStardustMag	The 25 best K-pop Songs of 2025	23	

== Charts ==
=== Weekly charts ===
Weekly chart performance for "Style"
Chart (2025)	Peak position
China (TME Korean)	20
Global Excl. US (Billboard)	130
Indonesia (IFPI)	15
Japan (Japan Hot 100)	79
South Korea (Circle)	17
South Korea Hot 100 (Billboard)	67

=== Monthly charts ===
Monthly chart performance for "Style"
Chart (2025)	Position
South Korea (Circle)	17

=== Year-end charts ===
Year-end chart performance for "Style"
Chart (2025)	Position
Japan Heatseekers Songs (Billboard Japan)	6
South Korea (Circle)	74

== Release history ==
Release history for "Style"
Region	Date	Format	Label
Various	June 18, 2025	Digital download; streaming	SM; Kakao
