= Mega MGC Coffee =

South Korean coffeehouse chain

- Headquarters: South Korea
- Number of locations: 4,200+ (2026)
- Products: Coffee
- Website: www.mega-mgccoffee.com

Mega MGC Coffee (Korean: 메가 MGC 커피) is a coffee shop chain in South Korea.

Founded in 2015 and operated as a franchise, it has gained popularity, especially among students and young people, due to its affordable prices. The brand uses soccer player Son Heung-min and idol group ITZY as its promotional models.

By April 2026, Mega MGC Coffee operated more than 4,200 stores nationwide, the largest store network among South Korean coffee brands. The company opened its first overseas store in Ulaanbaatar, Mongolia, in May 2024, and has since expanded its overseas operations while exploring additional markets in Asia and the United States.

In July 2024, it collaborated with the Chinese company miHoYo and their game, Genshin Impact, releasing a menu and merchandise inspired by the character the Wanderer. Within 15 days of launching the collaboration, approximately 600,000 items were sold, and membership registration in the ordering app increased fivefold compared to the previous month.

In addition to selling beverages, Mega MGC Coffee also engages in entertainment ventures, such as hosting concerts in collaboration with external companies and supporting drama productions.

Since 2025, Mega MGC Coffee has run an annual marketing partnership with SM Entertainment called the "SMGC Campaign," featuring seasonal collaborations with different artists—Hearts2Hearts in spring, NCT Wish in summer, Riize in fall, and Super Junior in winter—each with themed menu items, merchandise, and in-store content. In March 2026, the two companies signed an agreement to continue the partnership with a second season of the campaign.

== Products ==
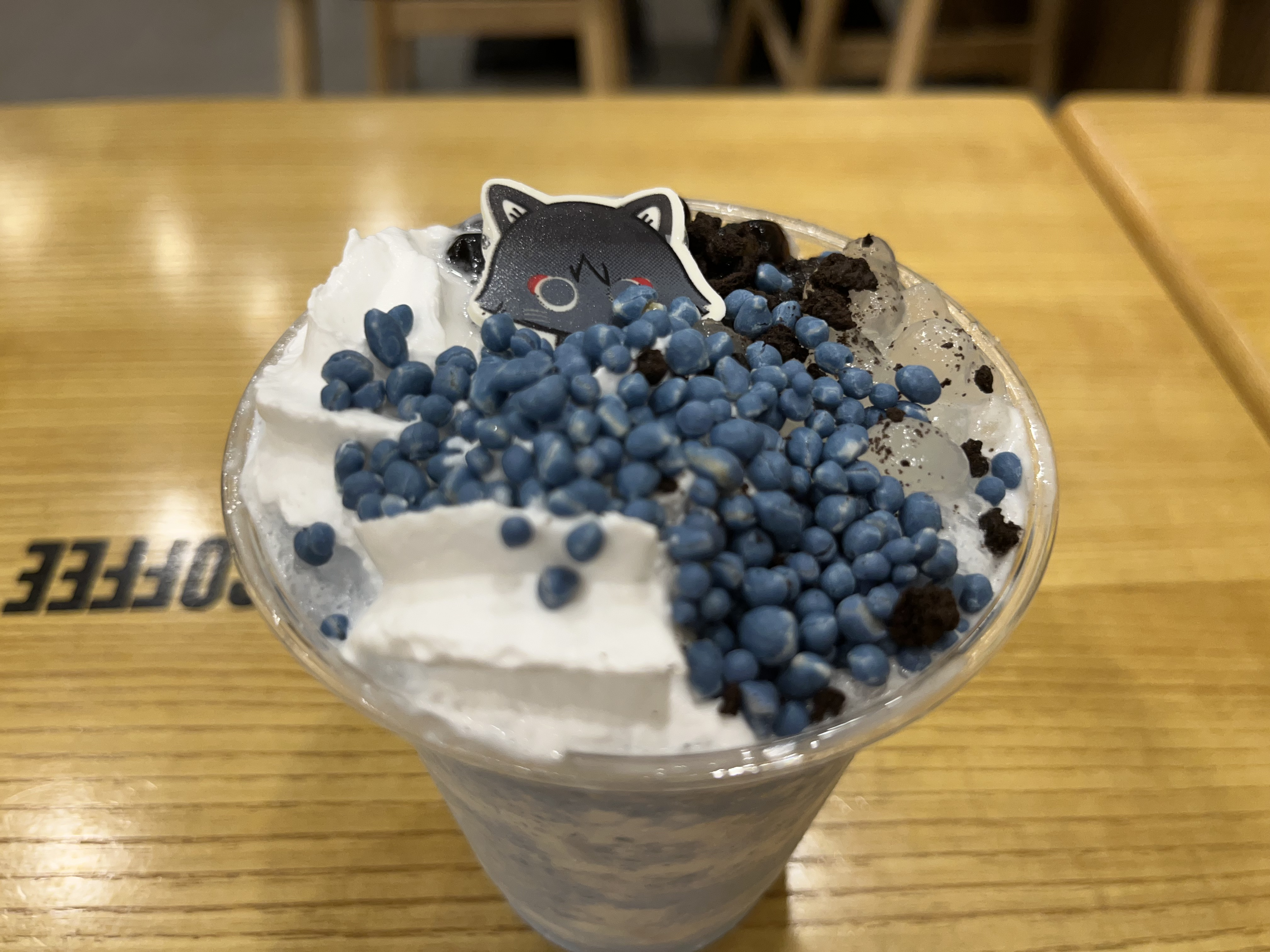
Example of products

In addition to coffee like Americano, the shop sells several dozen varieties of iced and hot drinks, including latte, ade, and decaf coffee. Seasonal and collaboration-limited menus are also available. Besides beverages, the shop sells desserts such as shaved ice, bread, and cakes, as well as related products like instant coffee and water bottles.
