= QWER =

South Korean girl band

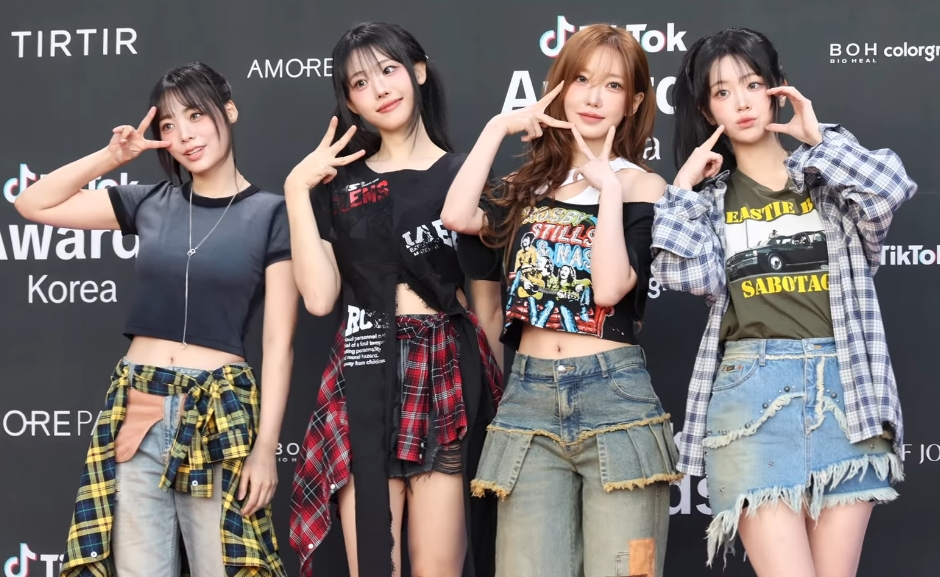
- QWER in 2025; L-to-R: Siyeon, Hina, Magenta, and Chodan

Background information
- Origin: Seoul, South Korea
- Genres: K-pop; pop rock
- Years active: 2023–present
- Label: Tamago Production
- Members: Chodan; Magenta; Hina; Siyeon
- Website: cafe.naver.com/eggkim

QWER (Korean: 큐더블유이알) is a rock and anime song style girl band under Tamago Production. They stated that they were inspired by Japanese idol-themed manga such as Oshi no Ko, Bocchi the Rock! and musical groups such as Yoasobi. They debuted on October 18, 2023, with the single album Harmony from Discord.

== Name ==
The group's English name is derived from QWERTY, the first six keys on the top row of letters on Latin-script alphabet keyboards. Q, W, E, and R are also the primary keys used in online games such as League of Legends. The fandom's name 바위게 (Rift Scuttler) is also a reference to the multiplayer video game.

== Career ==
=== Formation ===
The group was formed through the "QWER Project", a YouTube series aiming to create a girl group composed of female online personalities. The project was launched by Tamago Production, a company started by the YouTuber and web content creator Kim Gye-ran in collaboration with 3Y Corporation. "QWER Project" followed the four members' incorporation into the group, their training, and their daily lives.

QWER's actual management and production were jointly handled by 3Y Corporation and Prism Filter Music Group. 3Y Corporation is in charge of management tasks such as content making, schedule management, and marketing, and Prism Filter Music Group was in charge of all music-related tasks, such as members' lessons and training, album work, and concerts. On October 29, 2025, the joint production contract between 3Y Corporation and Prism Filter Music Group was terminated. From that point on, the management and support of all QWER activities were handled by Tamago Production and 3Y Corporation. It was announced that Producer Lee Dong-hyeok, who was in charge of the existing music production of 'QWER', will continue to be in charge of producing 'QWER' regardless of the termination of the co-production contract.

Prior to joining the band, each member already had established careers. Chodan and Magenta were active streamers on Twitch, Hina was a popular content creator and cosplayer on TikTok with 4 million followers, and Siyeon was a former member of the Japanese idol group NMB48. At the project's launch on July 2, 2023, Magenta and Hina began formally learning their assigned instruments (bass and guitar). Magenta had about three months of self-taught experience on the bass. Meanwhile, Hina had a musical background in music production and applied music through her college entrance preparations, although she was new to the electric guitar at the time.

=== 2023–present: Debut with Harmony from Discord, Manito and Algorithm's Blossom ===
QWER made their debut on October 18, 2023, with the single album Harmony from Discord. Songs from the album were first performed during their debut showcase at Musinsa Garage in Seoul. The lead track "Discord" placed 5th on Spotify's "Viral 50 – Japan". It debuted at number 88 on YouTube Music's "Korea Weekly Top Songs" chart at the time of its release and remained on the chart for 21 weeks.

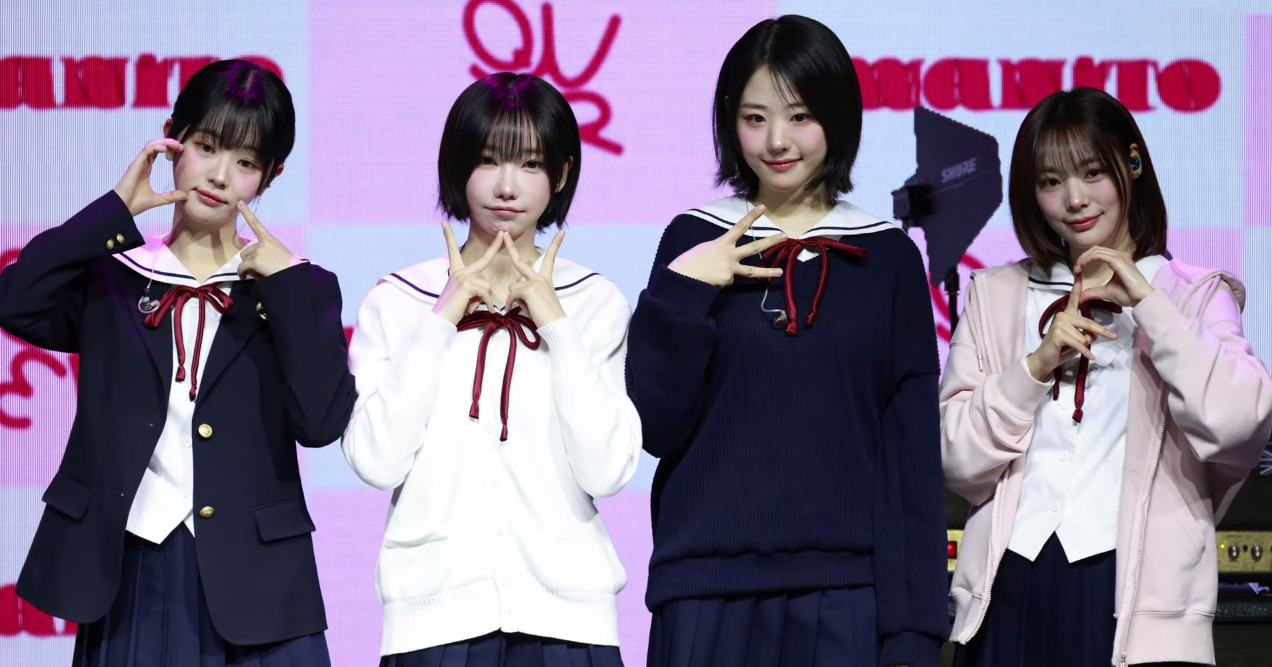
QWER during their group showcase in 2024

On March 18, 2024, the group announced their upcoming comeback. On the day of the announcement, QWER visited a military base and performed their unreleased single "T.B.H (고민중독)" from their upcoming EP. Their first EP Manito was released on April 1. Tracks from the EP were first performed in a showcase held at the Yes24 Live Hall in Seoul on the day of its release. On August 28, the group announced the release of their single "Fake Idol" on September 2. Their second EP Algorithm's Blossom was released on September 23, with the lead single "My Name Is Malguem", which gave the group their first music broadcast trophy since debut on October 9 on Show Champion.

On June 9, 2025, QWER released their third EP In a Million Noises, I'll Be Your Harmony, with the lead single "Dear". On July 18, the group announced that they would be embarking on their first world tour, Rockation, kicking off in Seoul from October 3 to 5. On October 6, QWER released a special single "Blue Whale", which is a remake of the hit song by South Korean rock band YB. It was later released as part of the special LP Beyond the Discord on October 13, along with five previously released singles.

On March 20, 2026, during the encore concert of QWER's Rockation world tour in Seoul, it was announced that their fourth EP Ceremony would be released on April 27. On July 8, QWER made their Japanese debut with the release of their first Japanese single "Show Down", which serves as the opening song for the anime "Tomb Raider King". In addition, they also participated in the ending song "To Be Continued". On July 12, it was announced that the group would be embarking on their second world tour, Rockation: Rocket Launch!!, kicking off in Seoul from September 12 to 13. The group released the special single titled "Dreamer & Picaresque", featuring the lead song "Dreamer" and the B-side "Picaresque", on September 21.

== Members ==
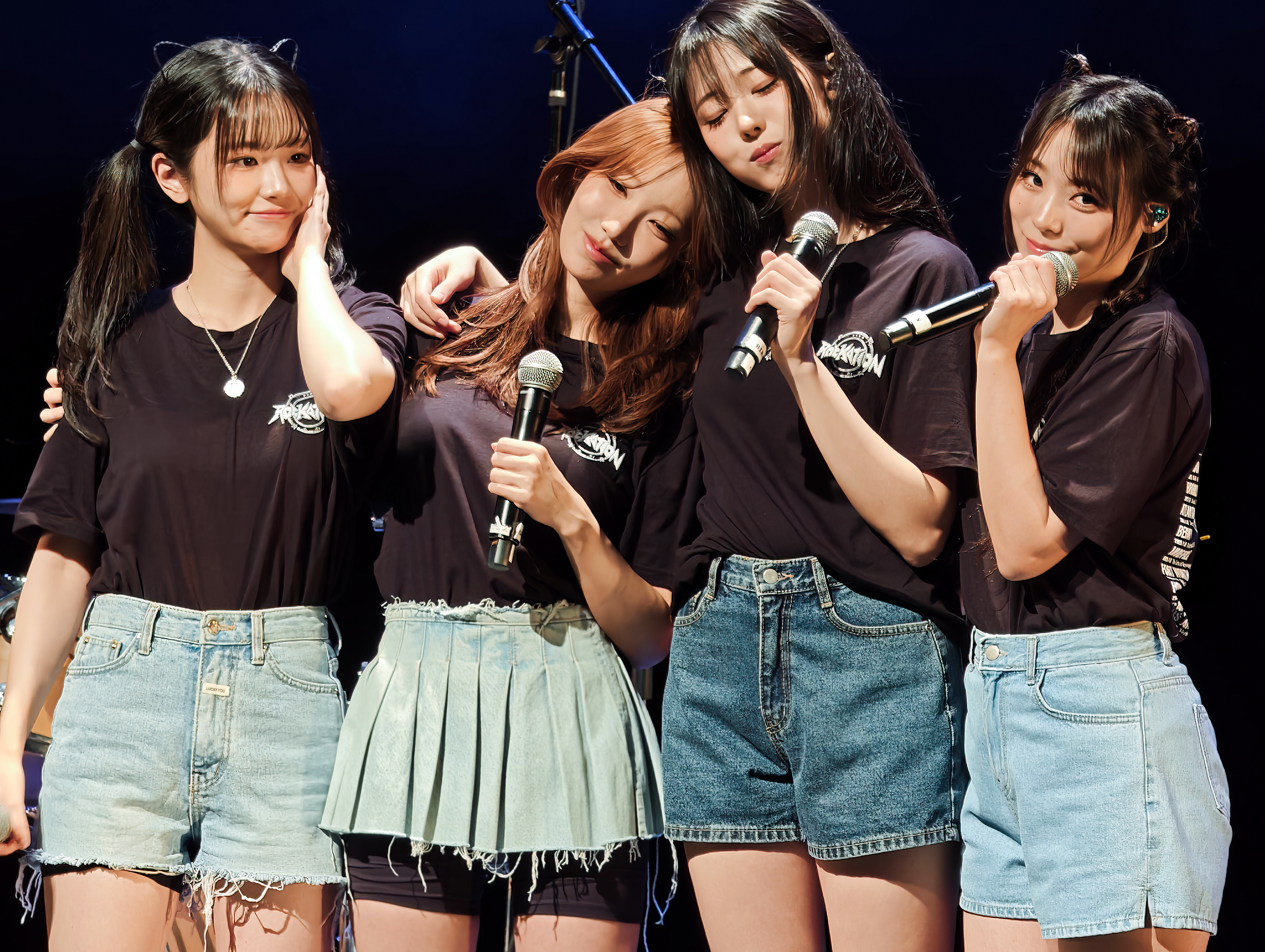
QWER in San Francisco for their Rockation tour in 2025 (L to R: Chodan, Magenta, Hina, and Siyeon)

- Chodan (쵸단) (Q) – drums, percussion, vocals
- Magenta (마젠타) (W) – bass
- Hina (히나) (E) – guitars, keyboards
- Siyeon (시연) (R) – main vocals, guitars

== Discography ==
=== Extended plays ===
List of extended plays, showing selected details, selected chart positions, and sales figures
Title	Details	Peak chart positions	Sales
Title	Details	KOR	Sales
Manito	Released: April 1, 2024; Label: 3Y Corporation, Kakao Entertainment; Format: CD, digital download, streaming; Track listing: 1. "T.B.H" (고민중독); 2. "Soda"; 3. "Free-Dumb" (자유선언); 4. "G9JB" (지구정복); 5. "Ferris Wheel" (대관람차); 6. "Make Our Highlight" (불꽃놀이); 7. "Manito" (마니또)	14	KOR: 55,577
Algorithm's Blossom	Released: September 23, 2024; Label: 3Y Corporation, Kakao Entertainment; Format: CD, digital download, streaming; Track listing: 1. "Intro"; 2. "Fake Idol" (가짜 아이돌); 3. "My Name Is Malguem" (내이름 맑음); 4. "Let's Love" (사랑하자); 5. "Run! Run! Run!" (달리기); 6. "Goodbye My Sadness" (안녕, 나의 슬픔); 7. "Rebound" (메아리); 8. "Outro"	10	KOR: 64,910
In a Million Noises, I'll Be Your Harmony (난 네 편이야, 온 세상이 불협일지라도)	Released: June 9, 2025; Label: 3Y Corporation, Kakao Entertainment; Format: CD, digital download, streaming; Track listing: 1. "Dear" (눈물참기); 2. "Be Happy" (행복해져라); 3. "#QWER" (검색어는 QWER); 4. "Overdrive"; 5. "D-Day"; 6. "Yours Sincerely"	5	KOR: 113,551
Ceremony	Released: April 27, 2026; Label: 3Y Corporation, Kakao Entertainment; Format: CD, digital download, streaming; Track listing: 1. "Ceremony"; 2. "Bad Habit"; 3. "Bani Bani" (바니바니); 4. "Our Voyage"; 5. "Pioneer"	5	KOR: 133,156

=== Single albums ===
List of single albums, showing selected details, selected chart positions, and sales figures
Title	Details	Peak chart positions	Sales
Title	Details	KOR	Sales
Harmony from Discord	Released: October 18, 2023; Label: 3Y Corporation, Kakao Entertainment; Format: CD, digital download, streaming; Track listing: 1. "Harmony of Stars" (별의 하모니); 2. "Discord"; 3. "Secret Diary" (수수께끼 다이어리); 4. "Discord" (Instrumental); 5. "Harmony of Stars" (Jin Rico remix)	8	KOR: 25,420

=== Singles ===
==== Korean singles ====
List of Korean singles, showing year released, selected chart positions, certifications, and name of the album
Title	Year	Peak chart positions			Certifications	Album
Title	Year	KOR	KOR Songs	WW Excl. US	Certifications	Album
"Discord"	2023	24	—	—		Harmony from Discord
"T.B.H" (고민중독)	2024	4	2	117	KMCA: Platinum (Note: Certification for streaming)	Manito
"Fake Idol" (가짜 아이돌)	2024	99	—	—		Algorithm's Blossom
"My Name Is Malguem" (내이름 맑음)	2024	2	1	111		Algorithm's Blossom
"Dear" (눈물참기)	2025	16	—	—		In a Million Noises, I'll Be Your Harmony
"Blue Whale" (흰수염고래)	2025	152	—	—		Non-album single
"Ceremony"	2026	118	—	—		Ceremony
"Dreamer" (소년만화) (Note: "Dreamer" was released as the lead song of the special single "Dreamer & Picaresque".)	2026	124	—	—		Non-album single
"—" denotes a recording that did not chart or was not released in that territory

==== Japanese singles ====
List of Japanese singles, showing year released, and name of the album
Title	Year	Album
"Show Down"	2026	Non-album singles
"To Be Continued"	2026	Non-album singles

=== Other charted songs ===
List of other charted songs, showing year released, selected chart positions, and name of the album
Title	Year	Peak chart positions	Album
Title	Year	KOR Down.	Album
"Harmony of Stars" (별의 하모니)	2023	57	Harmony from Discord
"Soda"	2024	81	Manito
"Free-Dumb" (자유선언)	2024	83	Manito
"G9JB" (지구정복)	2024	82	Manito
"Ferris Wheel" (대관람차)	2024	72	Manito
"Make Our Highlight" (불꽃놀이)	2024	75	Manito
"Manito" (마니또)	2024	84	Manito
"Intro"	2024	79	Algorithm's Blossom
"Let's Love" (사랑하자)	2024	32	Algorithm's Blossom
"Run! Run! Run!" (달리기)	2024	35	Algorithm's Blossom
"Goodbye My Sadness" (안녕, 나의 슬픔)	2024	22	Algorithm's Blossom
"Rebound" (메아리)	2024	23	Algorithm's Blossom
"Outro"	2024	73	Algorithm's Blossom
"Be Happy" (행복해져라)	2025	13	In a Million Noises, I'll Be Your Harmony
"#QWER" (검색어는 QWER)	2025	18	In a Million Noises, I'll Be Your Harmony
"Overdrive"	2025	19	In a Million Noises, I'll Be Your Harmony
"D-Day"	2025	15	In a Million Noises, I'll Be Your Harmony
"Yours Sincerely"	2025	20	In a Million Noises, I'll Be Your Harmony

== Videography ==
=== Music videos ===
List of music videos, showing year released, and name of the director(s)
Title	Year	Director(s)	Ref.
"Discord"	2023	Oh Eunho	
"T.B.H" (고민중독)	2024	Jihoon Shin	
"Fake Idol" (가짜 아이돌)	2024	Yoon Joo-young	
"My Name Is Malguem" (내이름 맑음)	2024	Lee Jaedon	
"Dear" (눈물참기)	2025	Jihoon Shin	
"Ceremony"	2026	Junyeop Lee	
"Show Down"	2026	Sanghyun Park	
"Our Voyage"	2026	Stone	

== Filmography ==
=== Web shows ===
Year	Title	Notes	Ref.
2023	QWER Project (최애의 아이들)	YouTube series introducing the members of QWER	

== Concerts and tours ==
- 1, 2, QWER! Fan Concert (2025)
- Rockation World Tour (2025–2026)
- Rockation: Rocket Launch!! Tour (2026–2027)

=== Rockation World Tour ===
Date	City	Country	Venue	Ref.
October 3, 2025	Seoul	South Korea	Ticket Link Live Arena (Olympic Handball Stadium)	
October 4, 2025	Seoul	South Korea	Ticket Link Live Arena (Olympic Handball Stadium)	
October 5, 2025	Seoul	South Korea	Ticket Link Live Arena (Olympic Handball Stadium)	
October 31, 2025	New York City	United States	Music Hall of Williamsburg	
November 2, 2025	Atlanta	United States	Terminal West	
November 5, 2025	Berwyn	United States	Distro Music Hall	
November 7, 2025	Minneapolis	United States	The Lyric at Skyway Theatre	
November 11, 2025	Fort Worth	United States	Ridglea Theatre	
November 12, 2025	Houston	United States	Warehouse Live	
November 14, 2025	San Francisco	United States	Cowell Theater	
November 16, 2025	Los Angeles	United States	Vermont Hollywood	
January 3, 2026	Macau	China	The Londoner Theatre	
January 17, 2026	Kuala Lumpur	Malaysia	Zepp Kuala Lumpur	
February 8, 2026	Hong Kong	China	AsiaWorld-Expo, Runway 11	
February 14, 2026	Taipei	Taiwan	TICC	
February 19, 2026	Fukuoka	Japan	Zepp Fukuoka	
February 20, 2026	Osaka	Japan	Zepp Osaka Bayside	
February 22, 2026	Tokyo	Japan	Zepp DiverCity	
February 28, 2026	Singapore		The Theatre at Mediacorp	
March 20, 2026	Seoul	South Korea	Ticket Link Live Arena (Olympic Handball Stadium)	
March 21, 2026	Seoul	South Korea	Ticket Link Live Arena (Olympic Handball Stadium)	
March 22, 2026	Seoul	South Korea	Ticket Link Live Arena (Olympic Handball Stadium)	

=== Rockation: Rocket Launch!! Tour ===
Date	City	Country	Venue	Ref.
September 12, 2026	Seoul	South Korea	Korea University Tiger Dome	
September 13, 2026	Seoul	South Korea	Korea University Tiger Dome	
October 10, 2026	Taipei	Taiwan	NTSU Arena	
October 11, 2026	Taipei	Taiwan	NTSU Arena	
October 13, 2026	Fukuoka	Japan	UnitedLab	
October 15, 2026	Osaka	Japan	Gorilla Hall Osaka	
October 17, 2026	Tokyo	Japan	Spotify O-East	
November 7, 2026	Kuala Lumpur	Malaysia	Mega Star Arena	
November 14, 2026	Bangkok	Thailand	MCC Hall The Mall Lifestore Ngamwongwan	
January 2, 2027	Hong Kong	China	AsiaWorld–Expo, Hall 10	
January 8, 2027	Singapore		The Theatre at Mediacorp	
January 9, 2027	Singapore		The Theatre at Mediacorp	

== Awards and nominations ==
Name of the award ceremony, year presented, award category, nominee(s) and the result of the award
Award ceremony	Year	Category	Nominee/work	Result	Ref.
Asia Artist Awards	2024	Rookie of the Year – Music	QWER	Won	
Asia Artist Awards	2025	Best Band	QWER	Won	
Asia Artist Awards	2026	Popularity Award – Group (Female)	QWER	Pending	
D Awards	2025	Trend of the Year (Daesang)	QWER	Won	
D Awards	2025	Delights Blue Label	QWER	Won	
D Awards	2025	Best Band	QWER	Won	
Hanteo Music Awards	2025	Best Popular Artist	QWER	Nominated	
Hanteo Music Awards	2025	Best Global Popular Artist	QWER	Nominated	
Hanteo Music Awards	2025	Best Continent Artist – Africa	QWER	Nominated	
Hanteo Music Awards	2025	Best Continent Artist – Asia	QWER	Nominated	
Hanteo Music Awards	2025	Best Continent Artist – Europe	QWER	Nominated	
Hanteo Music Awards	2025	Best Continent Artist – North America	QWER	Nominated	
Hanteo Music Awards	2025	Best Continent Artist – Oceania	QWER	Nominated	
Hanteo Music Awards	2025	Best Continent Artist – South America	QWER	Nominated	
Hanteo Music Awards	2025	Emerging Artist	QWER	Nominated	
Hanteo Music Awards	2025	Special Award – Band	QWER	Nominated	
K-World Dream Awards	2024	K-World Dream Best Band Award	QWER	Won	
K-World Dream Awards	2024	K-World Dream Bonsang	QWER	Won	
K-World Dream Awards	2025	K-World Dream Best All-Rounder Musician	QWER	Won	
K-World Dream Awards	2025	K-World Dream Bonsang	QWER	Won	
Korea Grand Music Awards	2024	Best Band	QWER	Won	
Korea Grand Music Awards	2025	Best Artist 10	QWER	Nominated	
Korea Grand Music Awards	2025	Best Music Video	"Dear"	Nominated	
MAMA Awards	2024	Best Band Performance	"T.B.H"	Won	
MAMA Awards	2024	Artist of the Year	QWER	Nominated	
MAMA Awards	2024	Best New Female Artist	QWER	Nominated	
MAMA Awards	2024	Fans' Choice Female Top 10	QWER	Nominated	
MAMA Awards	2024	Song of the Year	"T.B.H"	Nominated	
MAMA Awards	2025	Best Band Performance	"Dear"	Nominated	
MAMA Awards	2025	Fans' Choice Top 10 – Female	QWER	Nominated	
MAMA Awards	2025	Song of the Year	"Dear"	Nominated	
Melon Music Awards	2024	Hot Trend Award	QWER	Won	
Melon Music Awards	2024	Top 10 Artist	QWER	Nominated	
Seoul Music Awards	2025	Main Prize (Bonsang)	QWER	Won	
Seoul Music Awards	2025	Grand Prize (Daesang)	QWER	Nominated	
Seoul Music Awards	2025	Popularity Award	QWER	Nominated	
Seoul Music Awards	2025	K-Wave Special Award	QWER	Nominated	
Seoul Music Awards	2025	K-pop World Choice – Group	QWER	Nominated	
TikTok Awards Korea	2025	Popularity Award	QWER	Won	
