= MAMA Award for Fans' Choice of the Year =

Korean music award

- Country: South Korea
- Presented by: CJ E&M (Mnet)
- First award: 2018
- Currently held by: Enhypen (2026)

Highlights
- Most wins: BTS (6)
- Most nominations: Seventeen (7)
- Website: Mnet Asian Music Awards

The MAMA Award for Fans' Choice of the Year, previously named Worldwide Icon of the Year, is a daesang (or grand prize) award presented annually by CJ E&M (Mnet). It was first awarded at the 20th Mnet Asian Music Awards ceremony held in 2018 and is a 100% fan-voted accolade.

== Winners and nominees ==
Year	Recipient	Nominees	Ref.
Worldwide Icon of the Year
2018	BTS	Blackpink; Got7; Mamamoo; Monsta X; NCT 127; NU'EST W; Seventeen; Twice; Wanna One	
2019	BTS	Ateez; Blackpink; Exo; Got7; Monsta X; Seventeen; Tomorrow X Together; Twice; X1	
2020	BTS	Ateez; Blackpink; Got7; Mamamoo; NCT; Seventeen; Tomorrow X Together; Treasure; Twice	
2021	BTS	Enhypen; Lisa; NCT 127; NCT Dream; Seventeen; Stray Kids; Tomorrow X Together; Treasure; Twice	
2022	BTS	Blackpink; Enhypen; Got7; NCT Dream; Psy; Seventeen; Stray Kids; Tomorrow X Together; Treasure	
2023	BTS	Ateez; Enhypen; Lim Young-woong; NCT Dream; Seventeen; Stray Kids; Tomorrow X Together; Twice; Zerobaseone	
Fans' Choice of the Year
2024	Jimin	(G)I-dle; Aespa; Babymonster; Enhypen; Ive; IU; Jennie; Jimin; Jungkook; Lee Young-ji; NCT Dream; NewJeans; RM; Seventeen; Stray Kids; Tomorrow X Together; Twice; Unis; V; Zerobaseone	
2025	Enhypen	Aespa; Babymonster; Baekhyun; G-Dragon; Hearts2Hearts; I-dle; Illit; Irene; Itzy; IU; J-Hope; Jin; Le Sserafim; NCT Dream; Riize; Seventeen; Stray Kids; Twice; Zerobaseone	

== Artists with multiple wins ==
BTS is the only artist to receive the award multiple times, doing so for a record six consecutive years. (Note: The group would win seven consecutive years if includes 2024 winner Jimin.)

== Artists with multiple nominations ==
Note: The following nominees are Worldwide Fans' Choice Top 10 winners

7 nominations

- Seventeen

6 nominations

- BTS (Note: Additionally, 2024 nominees Jimin, Jungkook, RM, and V are members of BTS.)
- Tomorrow X Together
- Twice

4 nominations

- Blackpink (Note: Additionally, 2021 nominee Lisa and 2024 nominee Jennie are members of Blackpink.)
- Got7
- Enhypen
- NCT Dream (Note: This does not include their 2020 nomination as NCT)
- Stray Kids

3 nominations

- Ateez
- Treasure

2 nominations

- Mamamoo
- Monsta X
- NCT 127
- Zerobaseone
