= Rude! =

2026 single by Hearts2Hearts

Single by Hearts2Hearts
- Language: Korean; English
- Released: February 20, 2026
- Studio: SM Starlight (Seoul); SM Dorii (Seoul); SM Aube (Seoul)
- Genre: Dance
- Length: 3:20
- Label: SM; Kakao
- Composers: Sebastian Thott; Maya Rose; Arineh Karimi
- Lyricists: Park Tae-won; Danke; Lee Hyung-seok

Hearts2Hearts singles chronology
"Focus" (2025)	"Rude!" (2026)	"Lemon Tang" (2026)

Music video
- "Rude!" on YouTube

Professional ratings
Review scores
Source	Rating
IZM	3/5 stars

"Rude!" is a song recorded by South Korean girl group Hearts2Hearts. Written by Sebastian Thott, Maya Rose and Arineh Karimi, it was released by SM Entertainment on February 20, 2026. Initially a standalone single, the song was later included on Hearts2Hearts's second extended play, Lemon Tang, released on June 22, 2026.

== Background and release ==
On February 6, 2026, SM Entertainment announced that Hearts2Hearts would be releasing the single "Rude!" on February 20, 2026. On February 12, a teaser trailer titled "How to Behave When the Heart is Missing" was released. On February 19, the music video teaser was released. The song was released alongside its music video on February 20.

== Composition ==
"Rude!" was written by Park Tae-won, Danke, and Lee Hyung-seok, composed and arranged by Sebastian Thott, with Maya Rose and Arineh Karimi contributing to the composition. It was described as a house-based dance song with lyrics that "express the cute rebellion of tomboys who are not bound by established rules".

== Commercial performance ==
"Rude!" debuted at number 129 on South Korea's Circle Digital Chart in the chart issue dated February 15–21, 2026; on its component charts, the song debuted at number three on the Circle Download Chart, and number 131 on the Circle BGM Chart. On the Billboard Korea Hot 100, the song debuted at number 11 in the chart issue dated March 7, 2026.

In Singapore, the song debuted at number 9 on the RIAS Official Singapore Regional Chart in the chart issue dated February 20–26, 2026. In Indonesia, the song debuted at number 13 on the ASIRI Official Indonesia Chart in the chart issue dated February 20–26, 2026. In Hong Kong, the song debuted at number 19 on the Billboard Hong Kong Songs in the chart issue dated March 7, 2026. In Taiwan, the song debuted at number 11 on the Billboard Taiwan Songs in the chart issue dated March 7, 2026.

In United States, the song debuted at number ten on the Billboard World Digital Song Sales in the chart issue dated March 7, 2026. In New Zealand, the song debuted at number 15 on the RMNZ Hot Singles in the chart issue dated February 27, 2026. Globally, the song debuted at number 80 on the Billboard Global 200 in the chart issue dated March 7, 2026. It also debuted at number 37 on the Billboard Global Excl. US in the chart issue dated March 7, 2026.

== Promotion ==
Hearts2Hearts debuted the song at their first fan meeting titled "Hearts 2 House" on February 21. They subsequently performed the song at four music programs: Mnet's M Countdown on February 26, KBS's Music Bank on February 27, MBC's Show! Music Core on February 28, and SBS's Inkigayo on March 1.

== Track listing ==
- Digital download and streaming – Remixes
1. "Rude!" (Silly Silky remix) – 3:56
2. "Rude!" (Yunji remix) – 3:11

== Credits and personnel ==
Credits adapted from Melon.

Studio

- SM Starlight Studio – recording, digital editing
- SM Dorii Studio – recording
- SM Aube Studio – recording
- SM Wavelet Studio – digital editing, engineered for mix
- SM Concert Hall Studio – mixing
- Klang Studio – mixing in Dolby Atmos
- Sterling Sound – mastering

Personnel

- SM Entertainment – executive producer
- Hearts2Hearts – vocals
- Park Tae-won – lyrics
- Danke – lyrics
- Lee Hyung-seok – lyrics
- Sebastian Thott – composition, arrangement
- Maya Rose – composition, background vocals
- Arineh Karimi – composition, background vocals
- Jsong – vocal directing, background vocals
- Kriz – vocal directing
- Jeong Yoo-ra – recording, digital editing
- Jeong Jae-won – recording
- Kim Hyo-joon – recording
- Kang Eun-ji – digital editing, engineered for mix
- Nam Koong-jin – mixing
- Koo Jong-pil – mixing in Dolby Atmos
- Joe LaPorta – mastering

== Accolades ==
Music program awards for "Rude!"
Program	Date	Ref.
Inkigayo	March 22, 2026	
M Countdown	March 5, 2026	
M Countdown	March 19, 2026	
Show! Music Core	March 14, 2026	
Show! Music Core	March 21, 2026	

== Charts ==
=== Weekly charts ===
Weekly chart performance for "Rude!"
Chart (2026)	Peak position
China (TME Korean)	3
Global 200 (Billboard)	57
Hong Kong (Billboard)	12
Indonesia (ASIRI)	13
Japan Hot 100 (Billboard)	19
New Zealand Hot Singles (RMNZ)	16
Singapore (RIAS)	15
South Korea (Circle)	1
South Korea Hot 100 (Billboard)	5
Taiwan (Billboard)	2
US World Digital Song Sales (Billboard)	10

=== Monthly charts ===
Monthly chart performance for "Rude!"
Chart (2026)	Position
South Korea (Circle)	1

== Release history ==
Release history for "Rude!"
Region	Date	Format	Version	Label
Various	February 20, 2026	Digital download; streaming	Original	SM; Kakao
Various	March 18, 2026	Digital download; streaming	Japanese	SM; Kakao
Various	March 27, 2026	Digital download; streaming	Remixes	SM; Kakao
