= 2026 Melon Music Awards =

- Official poster
- Date: November 14–15, 2026
- Venue: Gocheok Sky Dome
- Country: South Korea

Highlights
- Most wins: BTS (6)
- Most nominations: Cortis; Ive; (9 each)
- Website: melon.com/mma/info.htm

Television/radio coverage
- Network: Melon; Wavve; U-Next (Japan); TVBS (Taiwan); Catchplay+ (Taiwan); 1theK (ex. KR, JP & TW)

The 2026 Melon Music Awards (Korean: 2026 멜론 뮤직어워드), part of the Melon Music Awards series, was held from November 14 to 15, 2026, at the Gocheok Sky Dome in Seoul, South Korea. Organized by Melon and its parent company Kakao Entertainment, the broadcast was aired through Melon and Wavve in South Korea, U-Next in Japan, TVBS (Cable TV) and Catchplay+ (Online) in Taiwan and 1theK elsewhere.

== Criteria ==
All songs and albums that are eligible to be nominated must be released from November 20, 2025, to October 14, 2026.

Category	Digital sales	Online voting	Panelist
Grand Prize (Note: Consists of Album of the Year, Artist of the Year, and Song of the Year)	60%	20%	20%
Record of the Year and Global K-Artist of the Year	N/A		100%
Main Awards (Note: Consists of Top 10 Artists, Rookie of the Year, Best Pop Artist, Best Male Solo, Best Female Solo, Best Male Group, Best Female Group, Best OST, and Global Top 10)	60%	20%	20%
Special Awards (Note: Consists of Stage of the Year, Hot Trend, Best Performance – Female, Best Performance – Male, Best Music Video, Songwriter Award, J-Pop Favorite Artist, Global Artist, Global Rising Artist, Best Music Style, 1theK Icon, and Best Producer)	N/A		100%
Kakao Bank's Favorite Star Award	N/A	80%	20%
Track Zero Choice	20%	20%	60%
Japan Favorite Artist by U-Next	N/A	50%	50%

== Performers ==
The list of performers was announced throughout October, with the final line-up revealed on October 14.

=== Day 1 (November 14) ===
List of day 1 performances
Artist(s)	Song(s) performed	Segment
Dragon Pony	"Not Out" (MMA version) "Calling Back" (MMA version)	Brilliant Imperfect: To Our Youth
Tuide	"Sun Kiss" (MMA version) "Grls" (MMA version)	Color the Tuide
AEN	"X to Z (Next to Me)"	Search Log
Idid	"Fly!"	Search Log
Hearts2Hearts	"15-Love" (MMA version) "Rude!" (MMA version) (Note: Special appearance of Mimiminu.)	Who Says It's Out?
Hana	"Blue Jeans" "Non Stop" "Rose"	Beautiful Ruin
Rescene	"With" (MMA version) "Deja Vu" (MMA version) "Love Attack" (MMA version)	The Unstoppable Rise
TWS	"Overdrive" (MMA version) (Note: Magic performance with Yu Ho-jin, Muma, and Hansu of Hundred Fingers.) "You, You" (MMA version)	Riding the High
Yena	"Fiesta" (MMA version) "Smiley" (MMA version) "Catch Catch" (Big Band version)	Blooming Yena
Riize	"Insomnia" "Overdrive" "Do Your Dance" (Note: Dance performance with Minami Crew and The Moonhwa.)	Act II: Beyond the Horizon
I.O.I	"Whatta Man" "Suddenly"	Encore: Our Story Continues
Aespa	"WDA (Whole Different Animal)" (MMA version) "Switchblade" (MMA version) "Lemonade" (MMA version)	Climax
Ateez	"Up" "Drip" "Bad"	Still We Sail
NCT Dream	"Boom" "Better Than Gold" "Boogie Woogie"	The Night Is Yours

=== Day 2 (November 15) ===
List of day 1 performances
Artist(s)	Song(s) performed	Segment
Hrtz.wav	"Alive"	Out of Sync: Find Out Hertz
And2ble	Intro performance "French Kissing" "Curious" (Rock version)	Until It Overflows
Lngshot	"Saucin'" "Moonwalkin'" "Bananas"	Takeover
82Major	"Like Fire" "Overheating"	점火: 82
Plave	"Watch Me Woo!" "Star Trace" "Born Savage"	Cosmic Overdrive
Alpha Drive One	"Freak Alarm" (MMA version) "Born Dire" (MMA version)	United We Rise
Cortis	"MoneyMoneyMoney" "RedRed" "YoungCreatorCrew"	The Way We Play
KiiiKiii	"Pop Off Pop Off" "Delulu" "404 (New Era)"	4:04 Not Asleep
Illit	Intro + "You're Under Arrest"; Dance Break: Who's Your Bias + "It's Me" (MMA version)	Momentum
NCT Wish	"Boy Meets Girl" (Korean version) "We Own This Street" "I Spy"	Straight on You
Ive	"Dear. Cupid" "Bang Bang" "Looks Can Kill"	Slay
NCT 127	"Cherry Bomb" "Kick It" "Piñata" "Blingy"	Still Burning

== Presenters ==
The line-up of presenters was announced on October 23.

=== Day 1 (November 14) ===
- Roh Yoon-seo – presented Global Top 10
- Yoo Seung-ho – presented Global Top 10 and Stage of the Year
- Park Siwoo and Oh Na-ra – presented Best Performance – Male and Kakao Bank Everyone's Star
- Kang Hoon – presented Best Music Style and Global Top 10
- Jang Keun-suk and Yoon Eun-hye – presented Global Top 10 and J-Pop Favorite Artist
- Lee Si-woo and Han Ye-ri – presented Hot Trend and Global Impact Artist
- Kim Tae-young and Lee Yeon – presented Hot Trend and Best Producer
- Ryeoun and Shin Ye-eun – presented Global Impact Artist and Global Rising Artist
- Kwon Sung-jun and Kim Shin-young – presented Top 10 and Best Performance – Male
- Kang So-ra – presented Best Solo – Female and Best Solo – Male
- Lee Do-hyun – presented Global Top 10 and Top 10
- Lee Young-ae – presented Album of the Year and Global K-Artist of the Year

=== Day 2 (November 15) ===
- Moon Sang-min and Roh Jeong-eui – presented Top 10
- Lee Se-young – presented Top 10 and Best Performance – Female
- Gamst and Jonathan Yiombi – presented Japan Favorite Artist by U-Next and Best Performance – Female
- Kim Min-seok and Choi Ji-su – presented Global Impact Artist
- Shin Gi-ru – presented 1theK Icon and Best Songwriter
- Won Gyu-bin and Kim Shin-rok – presentes Best Group – Female and Best Group – Male
- Kwak Beom and Lee Chang-ho – presented Best Music Video and Global Rising Artist
- Choi Daniel and Lee Joo-bin – presented Global Top 10 and New Artist of the Year
- Lee Joon – presented New Artist of the Year and Track Zero Choice
- Ahn Jae-hyun – presented Top 10
- Jang Do-yeon and Lee Hyun-yi – presented Global Top 10 and Best Music Style
- Kim Jae-young – presented Top 10
- Hong Jong-hyun – presented Global Top 10
- Byun Yo-han and Tiffany Young – presented Artist of the Year and Record of the Year
- Lee Seung-chul – presented Song of the Year

== Winners and nominees ==
The list of nominees for the Top 10 Award was announced on October 15, 2026, through the official website. Voting took place from October 15 to 29, and winner was announced on October 30. The remaining categories, excluding Record of the Year and Hot Trend Award, was announced on October 30. Voting began that same day and ended on November 13.

Winners and nominees are listed in alphanumerical order, with winners listed first and emphasised in bold.

=== Grand Prize ===
List of winners and nominees for the Grand prize
**Artist of the Year** **(Daesang)**: **BTS**; AKMU; Cortis; Ive; Plave; List of longlisted nominees: Hearts2Hearts; I.O.I; Illit; KiiiKiii; NCT Wish	**Album of the Year** **(Daesang)**: **BTS – Arirang**; AKMU – Flowering; Aespa – Lemonade; Cortis – GreenGreen; Ive – Revive+; List of longlisted nominees: AllDay Project – AllDay Project; I.O.I – I.O.I: Loop; Illit – Mamihlapinatapai; KiiiKiii – Delulu Pack; Yena – Love Catcher
**Song of the Year** **(Daesang)**: **Ive – "Bang Bang"**; BTS – "Swim"; Cortis – "RedRed"; Hearts2Hearts – "Rude!"; KiiiKiii – "404 (New Era)"; List of longlisted nominees: AKMU – "Paradise of Rumors"; Aespa – "Lemonade"; I.O.I – "Suddenly"; Illit – "It's Me"; Yena – "Catch Catch"	**Record of the Year** **(Daesang)**: **Cortis**
**Song of the Year** **(Daesang)**: **Ive – "Bang Bang"**; BTS – "Swim"; Cortis – "RedRed"; Hearts2Hearts – "Rude!"; KiiiKiii – "404 (New Era)"; List of longlisted nominees: AKMU – "Paradise of Rumors"; Aespa – "Lemonade"; I.O.I – "Suddenly"; Illit – "It's Me"; Yena – "Catch Catch"	**Global K-Artist of the Year** **(Daesang)**: **Aespa**

=== Main awards ===
List of winners and nominees for the main awards
**Top 10**: **AKMU**; **BTS**; **Cortis**; **Hearts2Hearts**; **I.O.I**; **Illit**; **Ive**; **KiiiKiii**; **NCT Wish**; **Plave**; List of nominees: AllDay Project; Aespa; Ateez; Big Naughty; Blackpink; Bol4; BoyNextDoor; Fromis 9; Le Sserafim; Lee Chang-sub; Lim Young-woong; Nmixx; Rescene; Riize; Taeyeon; TWS; Woodz; Yena; Yoon Ji-hwan; Young K	**Global Top 10**: **Aespa**; **BTS**; **Cortis**; **G-Dragon**; **Hearts2Hearts**; **Illit**; **Ive**; **NCT Wish**; **Rescene**; **Riize**; List of nominees: Babymonster; BigBang; Blackpink; BoyNextDoor; Enhypen; Exo; I-dle; IU; Jennie; Le Sserafim; NCT Dream; NewJeans; Nmixx; Rosé; Seventeen; Stray Kids; Tomorrow X Together; Twice; TWS; Yena
**New Artist of the Year**: **Lngshot**; **Alpha Drive One**; Hades; System Seoul; Tuide	**Best Pop Artist**: **Bruno Mars**; Ariana Grande; Charlie Puth; Katseye; Tame Impala
**Best Solo – Male**: **Lim Young-woong**; Big Naughty; Lee Chang-sub; Yoon Ji-hwan; Young K	**Best Solo – Female**: **Yena**; BOL4; IU; Jennie; Taeyeon
**Best Group – Male**: **BTS**; BoyNextDoor; Cortis; NCT Wish; Plave	**Best Group – Female**: **Ive**; Aespa; Hearts2Hearts; Illit; KiiiKiii
**Best OST**: **Kim Min-seok – "Love Language" (from Can This Love Be Translated?)**; Plave – "Love Is Enough" (from Sold Out on You); Sung Si-kyung – "Anytime Anyhow" (from Surely Tomorrow); Woodz – "Everglow" (from Perfect Crown); Triangle (Note: Performed by Gang Dong-won, Um Tae-goo, and Park Jihyun) – "Love Is..." (from Wild Sing)

=== Popularity awards ===
List of winners for the special awards
**Track Zero Choice**: **Sumin – "+82"**; DeVita – "Tricycle"; Goat's Horn, Dog's Heart – "Goat's Horn, Dog's Heart"; Haepa – "Model Citizen"; Kangziwon – "Lemon"; Electron Sheep – "Kids Return"; NokENok – "Summer Break"; Silica Gel – "Big Void"; Wave to Earth – "Courage"; Youra – "Bathtub"
**Kakao Bank Everyone's Star**: **Rescene**; Aespa; Ateez; Cortis; Hearts2Hearts; I.O.I; Ive; NCT Wish; Riize; TWS	**Japan Favorite Artist by U-Next**: **NCT Wish**; Cortis; Illit; Ive; Riize

=== Special awards ===
List of winners for the special awards
**Best Music Video**: **Ive – "Bang Bang"**	**Best Music Style**: **I.O.I**; **KiiiKiii**
**Best Performance – Female**: **KiiiKiii**; **Illit**	**Best Performance – Male**: **Ateez**; **Riize**
**Best Producer**: **Kim Hyun-jung (BigHit Music)**	**Best Songwriter**: **Lee Chan-hyuk (AKMU)**
**1theK Icon**: **Hrtz.wav**	**Hot Trend**: **Ateez**; **Rescene**
**Global Impact Artist**: **Hearts2Hearts**; **Illit**; **NCT Wish**; **TWS**	**Global Rising Artist**: **And2ble**; **Tuide**
**J-Pop Favorite Artist**: **Hana**	**Stage of the Year**: **BTS – Arirang World Tour**

== Multiple awards ==
The following artist(s) received two or more awards:

Count	Artist(s)
6	BTS
5	Ive
4	Illit
4	NCT Wish
3	Cortis
3	Hearts2Hearts
3	KiiiKiii
3	Rescene
2	Aespa
2	Ateez
2	I.O.I
2	Riize
