= Green Bridge =

Green Bridge may refer to:

== Structures ==
- Pedestrian separation structure, a structure that removes pedestrians from a vehicle roadway
- Wildlife crossing, a bridge built to allow wildlife to move over highways safely
- Green bridge (filtration system), a water filtration system

=== Bridges ===
==== United States ====
- Green Bridge (Las Cruces, New Mexico), listed on the National Register of Historic Places in Dona Ana County, New Mexico
- Green Bridge (New Orleans)
- Pasco-Kennewick Bridge (1922), Pasco-Kennewick, Washington
- Sundial Bridge at Turtle Bay, Redding, California USA
- Green Bridge (Manatee River), a Special routes of U.S. Route 41, Manatee County, Florida
- Frank J. Wood Bridge, a three span truss style bridge built in 1932, connecting Brunswick and Topsham, Maine

==== Other countries ====
- Eleanor Schonell Bridge, originally "Green Bridge", at the University of Queensland, Australia
- Goodwill Bridge, Queensland University of Technology, Australia
- Montreal/Laval Green Bridge, Canada
- Green Bridge (Bangkok), Bangkok, Thailand
- Green Bridge (Vilnius), Vilnius, Lithuania
- Green Bridge (Saint Petersburg), Saint Petersburg, Russia
- Green Bridge of Wales, a natural arch on the Pembrokeshire coast
- The Green Bridge, which connects the two halves of Mile End Park, London
- Kangaroo Point Green Bridge, Kangaroo Point Bridge links the City and Kangaroo Point in Brisbane, Australia
- Green Bridge (England), a river crossing in North Yorkshire, England

== Other ==
- Greenbridge science park, in Ostend, Belgium
- Greenbridge (album), an album by SGreen Flame Boys
