= 404 (New Era) =

Single by KiiiKiii

from the EP Delulu Pack
- Language: Korean; English
- Released: January 26, 2026
- Studio: Ingrid Studio; Doobdoob Studio
- Genre: K-pop; house; UK garage
- Length: 2:59
- Label: Starship
- Composers: LDN Noise; Hayden Chapman; Greg Bonnick; Ellen Berg; Moa "Cazzi Opeia" Carlebecker
- Lyricist: Omega Sapien
- Producer: LDN Noise

KiiiKiii singles chronology
"To Me from Me" (2025)	"404 (New Era)" (2026)	"Pop Off Pop Off" (2026)

"404 (New Era)" is a song by the South Korean idol girl group KiiiKiii. It was released by Starship Entertainment on January 26, 2026, as the lead single of their second extended play Delulu Pack (2026). The song was produced and composed by the duo LDN Noise, with lyrics from the rapper Omega Sapien and additional composition from the Swedish songwriters Ellen Berg and Moa "Cazzi Opeia" Carlebecker. A UK garage and house song, "404" is built around simple electronic melodies and uses the error message 404 Not Found in its lyrics as a metaphor for living freely. It received positive reviews from critics, many of which praising its Y2K aesthetic and LDN Noise's production.

A commercial success, the song reached number one on the Circle Chart in South Korea and charted in various countries. It won Song of the Year at the SPOTV K-pop Awards and Most Streamed Song at the Korea Grand Music Awards. At the 69th Annual Grammy Awards, "404 (New Era)" received a nomination for Best Asian Pop Music Performance, which was KiiiKiii's first ever nomination at the Grammy Awards.

== Background and release ==
KiiiKiii debuted in March 2025 with their first extended play Uncut Gem. It achieved commercial and critical success for the group, receiving 14 domestic music awards. On January 5, 2026, KiiiKiii announced their second extended play Delulu Pack.

Concept photos were posted for the EP on January 16, many of which using the phrases related to HTTP 404 errors, relating to the title of the EP's lead single. The photos incorporate the members' likenesses into various well-known objects, such as airplane seat monitors, claw machines, clocks, coffee vending machines, and candles; Kim Min-ji of News1 states that the concept photos visualize the idea of "KiiiKiii is everywhere". At 6:00 PM (Note: Korean Standard Time (UTC+09:00)) on January 19, a video sharing a clip of "404" and its choreography was posted to the short-form video sharing app TikTok, following the release of a highlight medley for Delulu Pack the previous day. A teaser trailer for the music video of "404" was posted to KiiiKiii's official social media accounts on January 23. On January 26, "404 (New Era)" was officially released, along with its EP Delulu Pack. To commemorate the release of the EP, a showcase was held at Yes24 Live Hall, where "404" was performed.

== Composition and lyrics ==
"404 (New Era)"
A sample demonstrating the chorus of "404 (New Era)", which uses the error HTTP 404 as a metaphor for freedom.

"404 (New Era)" is a song inspired by UK garage and house music. Seon Mi-gyeong of OSEN described the song as being built around classic, bouncing chords, a heavy, flowing bassline, and sharp, modern club sounds. It was produced and composed by the London-based duo LDN Noise, with the rapper Omega Sapien of the musical collective Balming Tiger contributing to the song's lyrics.

The song begins with the hook "404, not found in the system / 404, the new era, era." The Internet error 404 Not Found is used in the lyrics of "404" as a metaphor for "freedom beyond boundaries", being used in lyrics such as "404, a point beyond the coordinates" (Note: Korean: 404 좌표 밖의 지점; RR: 404 jwapyo bakkui jijeom) and "404, even a blank page gets a perfect score" (Note: Korean: 404 백지를 내도 백점; RR: 404 baekjireul naedo baekjeom) which explore the concept of existing freely outside the system. The group member Leesol stated in an interview with the music magazine The Fader that the message of "404" is that there is no right answer in life. In an interview with Clash Magazine, the group member Sui said that the concept of "404" was one that KiiiKiii had never tried, adding that challenging themselves with a new concept helped them grow as a group. The group member Jiyu, in the same interview, stated that "404" best represents its EP Delulu Pack, as it represents the group's idea of self confidence.

== Music videos ==
KiiiKiii member Haum as an early-2000s pop star

The official music video of "404 (New Era)", released on January 26, 2026, starts with clips from home videos of KiiiKiii's members as children, quickly interspersed with scenes of them in a dance practice room. Throughout the video, KiiiKiii's members are shown as popular musicians from various eras, such as members of a 1960s girl group, rock stars, and Y2K-era pop stars. The group member Kya has stated that the group wanted the music video to portray them as the divas they had dreamed of being in their childhoods. The Asian entertainment magazine Bandwagon described the video as a "glitchy, dazzling trip into KiiiKiii's inner world". Lucy Ford, writing for NME, connected the music video to the concept of delulu, the namesake of KiiiKiii's extended play Delulu Pack. She commented on how the music video was inspired by group members' childhood dreams, labeling the music video as "a smash-cut proof of concept that every wild fantasy has to start somewhere". When interviewed by Ford, Jiyu stated that despite originating from an internet meme, delulu was an optimistic driving force for the group.

On February 6, an alternate music video was released, recorded by KiiiKiii's members themselves, titled "(No Reposts) We Tried Filming the '404 (New Era)' MV by Ourselves Haha". (Note: Korean: "(불펌X) 우리끼리 '404 (New Era)' 뮤비 찍어봄 ㅋlㅋl"; RR: "(Bulpeom X) Orikkiri '404 (New Era)' Myubi Jjikeobom Kiki") The video consists of scenes from the original music video's set recorded on a blurry camera. Ji Min-gyeong of The Chosun Ilbo stated that the music video showcases the original music video's Y2K aesthetic along with the "Gen-Z beauty" (Note: Korean: 젠지미; Hanja: 젠지美; RR: Jenjimi) concept of KiiiKiii as a group.

== Reception ==
=== Commercial performance ===
"404 (New Era)" is generally considered commercially successful. Jang Woo-yeong of the newspaper OSEN labeled "404" as a career high in terms of digital sales. "404 (New Era)" was also successful on several national sales charts, including topping both South Korea's weekly and monthly Circle Digital Charts shortly after release. On the week of March 7, 2026, "404 (New Era)" debuted at number 149 on the Billboard Global 200, which would remain as its peak. "404" charted in other Asian countries, peaking at number 12 in Taiwan and at number 84 in Japan. In China, "404" peaked at number 17 on the music distribution company TME's Korean music chart.

=== Critical reception ===
"404 (New Era) received largely favourable reviews from critics. In July 2026, Billboard writer Jeff Benjamin ranked "404 (New Era)" as the best K-pop song of 2026 up to that point. He praised the song's lyrics and production, stating that "[p]lenty of acts will tell you a new era has arrived. KiiiKiii announces that it will lead it". Aani Nagaiah, writing for Complex, placed "404" as the best K-pop song of 2026 up to September. She noted the song's use of nostalgia, with the opinion that its Y2K elements were built upon in the song rather than used as a crutch. IZM's Lee Jae-hun gave the song three-and-a-half stars out of five, commenting on how the song recreates aspects of mid-2010s K-pop and comparing "404" to LDN Noise's earlier works like "View" by Shinee and "4 Walls" by F(x).

== Accolades ==
At the 69th Annual Grammy Awards, "404 (New Era)" garnered KiiiKiii their first ever Grammy nomination in the category of Best Asian Pop Music Performance. "Bang Bang" by KiiiKiii's labelmate Ive was the only other K-pop song nominated in the category. At domestic award shows, KiiiKiii won the Korea Grand Music Award for Most Streamed Song and the SPOTV K-pop Award for Song of the Year. "404 (New Era)" also won first-place awards from the South Korean music programs M Countdown, Show Champion, and Show! Music Core.

Awards and nominations for "404 (New Era)"
Award ceremony	Year	Category	Result	Ref.
Grammy Awards	2027	Best Asian Pop Music Performance	Pending	
Korea Grand Music Awards	2026	Most Streamed Song	Won	
MAMA Awards	2026	Best Dance Performance – Female Group	Pending	
Melon Music Awards	2026	Song of the Year	Nominated	
SPOTV K-pop Awards	2026	Song of the Year	Won	

Music program awards
Program	Date	Ref.
M Countdown	February 12, 2026	
Show Champion	February 4, 2026	
Show! Music Core	February 7, 2026	

== Personnel ==
Adapted from the liner notes of Delulu Pack.

- Ellen Berg – composition, original lyrics, background vocals
- Moa "Cazzi Opeia" Carlebecker – composition, original lyrics, background vocals
- KiiiKiii – vocals, original lyrics
- LDN Noise – arrangement, production, background vocals, programming
  - Greg Bonnick – composition, original lyrics
  - Hayden Chapman – composition, original lyrics
- Omega Sapien – Korean lyrics
- Jeon Ju-hui – vocal direction, background vocals
- Ashley Alisha – background vocals
- Lee In-su – recording
- Kwon Yu-jin – recording
- Yu Jae-beom – recording
- Yeong Yeong-eun – digital editing
- Manny Park – mixing
- Dave Kutch – mastering

== Charts ==
=== Weekly charts ===
Weekly chart performance for "404 (New Era)"
Chart (2026)	Peak position
China Korean Chart (TME)	17
Estonia Airplay (TopHit)	65
Global 200 (Billboard)	149
Japan Hot 100 (Billboard)	84
South Korea (Circle)	1
South Korea Hot 100 (Billboard)	4
Taiwan Songs (Billboard)	12

=== Monthly charts ===
Monthly chart performance for "404 (New Era)"
Chart (2026)	Peak position
Estonia Airplay (TopHit)	95
South Korea (Circle)	1
