= 23rd Korean Music Awards =

2026 South Korean music award ceremony

- Official logo
- Date: February 26, 2026
- Location: Seoul, South Korea
- Hosted by: Nucksal

Highlights
- Most awards: Lee Chan-hyuk (3)
- Most nominations: Effie (6)
- Musician of the Year: Hanroro
- Album of the Year: Chudahye Chagis – Sosuminjok
- Song of the Year: Lee Chan-hyuk – "Endangered Love"
- Website: koreanmusicawards.com

Television/radio coverage
- Network: Melon; YouTube

The 23rd Korean Music Awards was held in Seoul, South Korea on February 26, 2026. Hosted by the Korean Music Awards Selection Committee and sponsored by the Ministry of Culture, Sports and Tourism and the Korea Creative Content Agency, the ceremony recognized the best music released in South Korea between December 1, 2024, and November 30, 2025.

Unlike other South Korean music awards, the Korean Music Awards are based on musical achievement rather than record sales. Winners are determined by the Korean Music Awards Selection Committee, which comprises music critics, radio show producers, academics, and other music industry professionals. Nominations were announced on February 5, 2026, through its official website and YouTube channel.

Hyperpop musician Effie is the most nominated artist with six nominations. Singer-songwriter Lee Chan-hyuk is the biggest winner of the night, winning three awards including Song of the Year for "Endangered Love". Sosuminjok by Chudahye Chagis won Album of the Year, Singer-songwriter Hanroro won Musician of the Year, while Huijun Woo won Rookie of the Year.

== Winners and nominees ==
Winners are listed first, highlighted in boldface, and indicated with a double dagger (‡). Nominees are listed in alphabetical order.

=== General field ===
**Album of the Year**: **Chudahye Chagis – 소수민족 (Sosuminjok) ‡**; Effie – Pullup to Busan 4 More Hyper Summer It's Gonna Be a Fuckin Movie; Huijun Woo – Pumping of Heart is Torturing; Jennie – Ruby; Kwon Tree – The Fragrance of Life; Lee Chan-hyuk – Eros	**Song of the Year**: **Lee Chan-hyuk – "Endangered Love" ‡**; Chudahye Chagis – "Heosse!"; Huijun Woo – "Spacious House"; Jennie – "Like Jennie"; Nmixx – "Blue Valentine"
**Musician of the Year**: **Hanroro ‡**; Effie; Jennie; Lee Chan-hyuk; Nmixx	**Rookie of the Year**: **Huijun Woo ‡**; AllDay Project; Gongwon; Peach Truck Hijackers; Rakunelama

=== Genre categories ===
**Best K-pop Album**: **Jennie – Ruby ‡**; Chaeyoung – Lil Fantasy Vol. 1; Mark – The Firstfruit; Nmixx – Blue Valentine; Nmixx – Fe3O4: Forward	**Best K-pop Song**: **Jennie – "Like Jennie" ‡**; AllDay Project – "Famous"; Hearts2Hearts – "Focus"; Le Sserafim – "Spaghetti" (featuring J-Hope); Nmixx – "Blue Valentine"
**Best Pop Album**: **Lee Chan-hyuk – Eros ‡**; Hyelyn Joo – Stereo; Lim Hyun-jung – Extraordinary; Song So-hee – Re:5; Yerin Baek – Flash and Core	**Best Pop Song**: **Lee Chan-hyuk – "Endangered Love" ‡**; Hwasa – "Good Goodbye"; Jowall – "Your Love as My Pretext" (featuring Haepa); Lim Hyun-jung – "The Road to Me Is Beautiful"; Yerin Baek – "Mirror"
**Best Rock Album**: **Wah Wah Wah & Noridogam – UBUBU ‡**; Green Flame Boys – Greenroof; Peach Truck Hijackers – Peach Truck Hijackers; YB – Odyssey	**Best Rock Song**: **Lee Seung-yoon – "PunKanon" ‡**; Bae Cheol-soo – "Ieodo Island (Parangdo Island)"; Green Flame Boys – "True Heart"; Uinone – "Apocalypse"; Wah Wah Wah & Noridogam – "Uncertainty"
**Best Alternative Rock Album**: **Shin In Ryu – Shining Strike ‡**; Gogohawk – Vol. 07; Hanroro – Jamong Salgu Club; Huijun Woo – Pumping of Heart is Torturing; Say Sue Me – Time is Not Yours	**Best Alternative Rock Song**: **Huijun Woo – "Spacious House" ‡**; Hanroro – "Goodbye, My Summer"; Jungwoo – "The Embers"; Noridogam – "Truthbuster"; Shin In Ryu – "Attack!"
**Best Electronic Album**: **Kirara – Kirara ‡**; Bojvck – UnderNationWide; Effie – E; Necta – Seoul Bizarre; Yetsuby – 4EVA	**Best Electronic Song**: **Melki – "Body Break" ‡**; Effie – "Open Ur Eyes"; Kirara – "Music" (with Sunwoo Jung-a); Naojusung – "Eternal Sunshine" (featuring Meaningful Stone); Necta – "Lady Love"
**Best Rap & Hip-Hop Album**: **Sik-K & Lil Moshpit – K-Flip+ ‡**; B-Free – Free the Mane 3 "Free the Mane vs. B-Free"; Effie – Pullup to Busan 4 More Hyper Summer It's Gonna Be a Fuckin Movie; Viceversa – Animal FKRY; Yumdda – Breathe 4	**Best Rap & Hip-Hop Song**: **Sik-K & Lil Moshpit – "LOV3" (featuring Bryan Chase & Okasian) ‡**; B-Free – "Nergal"; C Jamm – "Layered"; Effie – "Can I Sip 담배"; Yumdda – "Irony"
**Best R&B & Soul Album**: **Yoon Da-hye – Wang ‡**; Bibi – Eve: Romance; Chudahye Chagis – Sosuminjok; Jeebanoff – Misery; Shinjihang – Nong	**Best R&B & Soul Song**: **Chudahye Chagis – "Heosse!" ‡**; A.TRAIN – "Povidone" (featuring Danpyunsun); Hyelyn Joo – "Busy Boy"; Rakunelama – "B"; Yoon Da-hye – "Twin Flame"
**Best Folk Album**: **Kwon Tree – The Fragrance of Life ‡**; Joung Tae-choon & Park Eun-ohk – Between Hard Rain; Kim Hwal-sung – The Remnant Forest; Lucid Fall – Elsewhere; Sanmanhan – Sanmanhan 2	**Best Folk Song**: **Kwon Tree – "Unknowingly, So Did I" ‡**; Joung Tae-choon & Park Eun-ohk – "Between Hard Rain"; Kim Chang-wan – "A Day"; Kim Hwal-sung – "The Remnant Forest"; Sanmanhan – "Heart of a Dog"
**Best Metal & Hardcore Album**: **Baan – Neumann ‡**; Chain Reaction – A Love Supreme; Dulom – Axiom Zero; Loss of infection – 罰錢; Methkamel – Circle	**Best Global Contemporary Album**: **Gray by Silver – Time of Tree ‡**; Jeon Jin-hee – 雨後 uuhu; Jisu Jung & Baroque in Blue – Baroque in Blue; Jung Eun-hye, Cadejo, & Yechan Kim – Namdo Calling; Park Jiha – All Living Things
**Best Jazz Album**: **Malo – Malo Live at Muddy ‡**; Hakyung – Breathin In; Maria Kim – Love Letters; Oldie but Goodie – Oldie but Goodie; Yunmi Kang & John Stowell – A Timeless Place	**Best Jazz Instrumental Album**: **Mijung Lim – Impromptu ‡**; Shin Ah-ram – Bium Project II: After Bium; Sumin Jung – Remnants; Sunmi Hong – Fourth Page: Meaning of a Nest; Yonglee & the Doltang – Invisible Worker

=== Special awards ===
- Lifetime Achievement Award – Songgolmae
- Selection Committee Special Award – CJ Cultural Foundation's Tune Up

== Multiple awards ==
The following artist(s) received two or more awards:

Count	Artist(s)
3	Lee Chan-hyuk
2	Chudahye Chagis
2	Huijun Woo
2	Jennie
2	Kwon Tree
2	Lil Moshpit
2	Sik-K
