= Hey Hi =

Hey Hi may refer to:

- "Hey, Hi", a song by Noga Erez from The Vandalist
- "Hey Hi", a song by KiiiKiii from WhyKiiiKiii

== See also ==
- Hey Hi Hello (disambiguation)
- "Hey Hi HYD", a song by Glaive from Cypress Grove
