= KiiiKiii =

South Korean girl group

- KiiiKiii in August 2026; L–R: Kya, Leesol, Jiyu, Haum, and Sui

Background information
- Origin: Seoul, South Korea
- Genres: K-pop; EDM
- Years active: 2025–present
- Labels: Starship; Virgin
- Members: Leesol; Sui; Jiyu; Haum; Kya
- Website: kiiikiii.kr

KiiiKiii (Korean: 키키) is a South Korean girl group formed by Starship Entertainment. The group consists of five members: Leesol, Sui, Jiyu, Haum, and Kya. They debuted on March 24, 2025, with the extended play Uncut Gem. They are known for their Y2K- and 2010s-inspired aesthetics, as well as their EDM-heavy discography, though the media has noted that KiiiKiii switches genres often.

KiiiKiii's second extended play was released on January 26, 2026, and produced the single "404 (New Era)", which became their first number one single in South Korea. It won Song of the Year at the SPOTV K-pop Awards and was nominated for the Grammy Award for Best Asian Pop Music Performance.

== Name ==
The name "KiiiKiii" is a play-on-words in both Korean and English. In Korean, it is an onomatopoeia representing the sound of giggling, often described as "kiki" (키키), evoking a lighthearted and joyful feeling. In English, the name is symbolic of the word "key", signifying that the group strives to continue finding the "key" to life's answers with a smile on their face.

== History ==
=== 2025–present: Introduction and debut ===
On February 10, 2025, Starship Entertainment announced that it would be debuting a new girl group KiiiKiii, with the surprise launch of the group's social media accounts. Six days later, it was announced that the group's debut extended play Uncut Gem, would be released on March 24. That same day, the members were unveiled, and the music video for "I Do Me", a track from the EP, was released. On February 23, they released a celebratory music video titled "Debut Song" to commemorate their upcoming debut. On April 5, KiiiKiii won their first music broadcast trophy since debut on Show! Music Core with "I Do Me". On May 11, the group did their first international performance at KCON Japan. On August 6, they released their first digital single "Dancing Alone", with the lead song of the same name and B-side song "Strawberry Cheesegame". On October 28, it was revealed that Kakao Entertainment will release the web novel Dear.X: Tomorrow's Me, Today's Me, featuring KiiiKiii as its main characters. On November 4, the group released the song "To Me from Me", produced by Tablo, as its soundtrack.

In January 2026, it was announced that they would release a new album at the end of the month. On January 6, it was revealed to be KiiiKiii's second extended play Delulu Pack, with the lead single "404 (New Era)", which was released on January 26. On April 11, the group released the song "Go On", a soundtrack for the television series Perfect Crown. On May 16 and 17, they held their first fan concert KiiiKiii Festiiival. On July 20, it was announced that KiiiKiii's third extended play WhyKiiiKiii would be released on August 10, with the lead single "Pop Off Pop Off". A stop-motion video of the EP's track "Candy Pink Magic Hole Flip Phone" was pre-released on July 30.

== Artistry ==
=== Musical style ===
According to Kim Jae-heun of The Korea Herald, KiiiKiii is one of the groups proving the K-pop industry's love for electronic dance music. However, Kim also said that "musically, KiiiKiii has shown little interest in sticking to one genre". One of their early singles, "Debut Song", repeatedly switched genres and pace; according to Dazed's Taylor Glasby, the track also used chiptune and flute elements in "ways most human brains aren't meant to fully comprehend". Some of KiiiKiii's songs have drawn inspiration from UK house music, UK garage, hip-hop, and R&B. Their 2026 song "Candy Pink Magic Hole Flip Phone" was described as a mixture of hyperpop, synth-pop, and electronic music.

=== Visual style ===
Mashable's Crystal Bell believed that Y2K anemoia is the core of KiiiKiii's concept. On the other hand, Steffanee Wang of The Fader said that the group has a "mid-2010s Tumblr aesthetic" and praised them for "push[ing] back on the overarching expectations of female K-pop artists" through visual cues such as dirty fingernails and scene-inspired fashion. She called them one of the most interesting K-pop groups to debut in the 2020s. Defector Media's Kathryn Hu had a more negative view of KiiiKiii's concept, acknowledging the "cleverness" of its "referential satire" but finding it inauthentic and manufactured. She further opined that it could have been effective if the members had more experience in the industry, expressing concern over youngest member Kya's age specifically (14 at the time of debut).

== Other ventures ==
=== Ambassadorship ===
In January 2026, KiiiKiii had been appointed the official promotional ambassador for Seoul Metropolitan Government's newly redefined city color system "Seoul Color", which will be used by both public and private entities for festivals, public events, products, visual information, and in urban spaces to reflect changes in the digital era. In July, the group was appointed as a goodwill ambassador of Gangnam-gu for two years, promoting its policies and cultural and tourism resources through contents and major events in the district.

=== Endorsements ===
In April 2025, it was announced that KiiiKiii was selected as first promotional model for KakaoBank to strengthen its brand image "KakaoBank Mini", which aims to provide convenient financial services to young customers. On April 28, it was announced that the group became the promotional model for "King Fusion", a dessert menu of the fast food chain Burger King. It was followed by "All Day Snack" campaign and using "Debut Song" as its promotional song in July. In October, contemporary brand Thursday Island unveiled KiiiKiii as its muse, participating in its "Whispers of a Playful Winter" campaign.

In January 2026, the group was selected by Japanese lifestyle culture store WEGO as its promotional model for 2026 Spring season. In February, KiiiKiii collaborated with the American headwear brand New Era, presenting the brand's 2026 S/S collection. In April, they became the face of the Danish jewelry brand Pandora's "Be Your Lucky Charm" campaign. In June, KiiiKiii collaborated with GS25 to release strawberry and mango flavored gelato bars.

== Members ==
- Leesol (이솔)
- Sui (수이)
- Jiyu (지유)
- Haum (하음)
- Kya (키야)

== Discography ==
=== Extended plays ===
List of extended plays, showing selected details, selected chart positions, and sales figures
Title	Details	Peak chart positions		Sales
Title	Details	KOR	JPN	Sales
Uncut Gem	Released: March 24, 2025; Label: Starship; Formats: CD, digital download, streaming	1	33	KOR: 210,484; JPN: 3,699
Delulu Pack	Released: January 26, 2026; Label: Starship; Formats: CD, digital download, streaming	4	—	KOR: 119,259
WhyKiiiKiii	Released: August 10, 2026; Label: Starship; Formats: CD, digital download, streaming	4	13	KOR: 139,713; JPN: 6,750
"—" denotes releases that did not chart or were not released in that region.

=== Singles ===
List of singles, showing year released, selected chart positions, and name of the album
Title	Year	Peak chart positions							Album
Title	Year	KOR	KOR Hot	CHN KOR	EST Air.	JPN Hot	TWN	WW	Album
"I Do Me"	2025	13	—	34	—	—	—	—	Uncut Gem
"Dancing Alone"	2025	95	—	80	—	—	—	—	Non-album single
"404 (New Era)"	2026	1	4	17	65	84	12	149	Delulu Pack
"Pop Off Pop Off"	2026	10	—	6	—	—	21	—	WhyKiiiKiii
"—" denotes releases that did not chart or were not released in that region.

=== Soundtrack appearances ===
List of soundtrack appearances, showing year released, selected chart positions, and name of the album
Title	Year	Peak chart positions	Album
Title	Year	KOR	Album
"To Me from Me" (Note: "To Me from Me" is also included on Delulu Pack.)	2025	163	Dear.X: Tomorrow's Me, Today's Me OST
"Go On"	2026	— (Note: "Go On" did not enter the Circle Digital Chart, but peaked at number 95 on the component Download Chart.)	Perfect Crown OST Part 2
"—" denotes releases that did not chart or were not released in that region.

=== Other charted songs ===
List of other charted songs, showing year released, selected chart positions, and name of the album
Title	Year	Peak chart positions		Album
Title	Year	KOR	KOR DL	Album
"Debut Song"	2025	—	51	Uncut Gem
"Groundwork"	2025	—	48	Uncut Gem
"There They Go"	2025	—	49	Uncut Gem
"BTG"	2025	—	30	Uncut Gem
"One Off" (한 개뿐인)	2025	—	46	Uncut Gem
"Strawberry Cheesegame" (딸기게임)	2025	—	34	Non-album single
"Delulu"	2026	—	10	Delulu Pack
"Underdogs"	2026	—	14	Delulu Pack
"Mungnyang" (멍냥)	2026	—	20	Delulu Pack
"Dizzy"	2026	—	19	Delulu Pack
"Ever2Late!"	2026	155	16	WhyKiiiKiii
"Sweet Sour"	2026	184	18	WhyKiiiKiii
"Candy Pink Magic Hole Flip Phone" (나 어떡해)	2026	89	13	WhyKiiiKiii
"Hey Hi"	2026	—	19	WhyKiiiKiii
"Blue Hour"	2026	—	21	WhyKiiiKiii
"—" denotes releases that did not chart or were not released in that region.

== Videography ==
=== Music videos ===
Title	Year	Director(s)	Ref.
"I Do Me"	2025	Jinooya Makes	
"Debut Song"	2025	Kim Yeon-june, Jeong Hae-won	
"BTG"	2025	Jinooya Makes	
"Groundwork"	2025	Bang Jae-yeob	
"Dancing Alone"	2025	Jinooya Makes	
"404 (New Era)"	2026	Byul Yun	
"Pop Off Pop Off"	2026	Byul Yun	

=== Other videos ===
Title	Year	Director(s)	Ref.
"Strawberry Cheesegame" (딸기게임) Official Lyric Video	2025	Jinooya Makes	
"Delulu" Track Film	2026	Song Seo-yoon	
"Candy Pink Magic Hole Flip Phone" (나 어떡해) Stop-motion Video	2026	Park Hyun-gyeong, Byheyone	

== Filmography ==
=== Web shows ===
Year	Title	Notes	Ref.
2025–2026	KiiiKiii Pang Pang	Reality show series	

== Accolades ==
=== Awards and nominations ===
Name of the award ceremony, year presented, category, nominee(s) of the award, and the result of the nomination
Award ceremony	Year	Category	Nominee(s)	Result	Ref.
Asia Artist Awards	2025	Best Performance	KiiiKiii	Won	
Asia Artist Awards	2025	Rookie of the Year – Singer	KiiiKiii	Won	
Asia Star Entertainer Awards	2025	The Best New Artist	KiiiKiii	Won	
Brand Customer Loyalty Awards (Note: Co-organized by the Korean Customers Council and Brand Keys, this event recognizes the most influential brands in society and culture, as determined through consumer research.)	2025	Female Rookie Idol	KiiiKiii	Won	
Brand of the Year Awards (Note: It is a large-scale brand award that selects and awards the best brands that shined in the year through direct consumer voting.)	2025	Female Rookie Idol	KiiiKiii	Nominated	
The Fact Music Awards	2025	Next Leader Award	KiiiKiii	Won	
The Fact Music Awards	2026	Artist of the Year (Bonsang)	KiiiKiii	Won	
Golden Disc Awards	2026	Digital Song Bonsang	"I Do Me"	Nominated	
Golden Disc Awards	2026	Rookie Artist of the Year	KiiiKiii	Nominated	
Golden Disc Awards	2026	Next Generation	KiiiKiii	Won	
Grammy Awards	2027	Best Asian Pop Music Performance	"404 (New Era)"	Pending	
K-World Dream Awards	2025	Super Rookie Award	KiiiKiii	Won	
K-World Dream Awards	2026	K-World Dream Best Visual Content Award	KiiiKiii	Won	
K-World Dream Awards	2026	K-World Dream Artist Award	KiiiKiii	Won	
Korea First Brand Awards (Note: The Korea First Brand Awards is hosted by the Korea Consumer Brand Committee and the Korea Consumer Forum. Awards are based on a nationwide survey held in South Korea.)	2026	Female Rookie Idol	KiiiKiii	Nominated	
Korea Grand Music Awards	2025	IS Rising Star	KiiiKiii	Won	
Korea Grand Music Awards	2026	Grand Honor's Choice (Daesang)	KiiiKiii	Won	
Korea Grand Music Awards	2026	Best Streaming Song	"404 (New Era)"	Won	
Korea Grand Music Awards	2026	Best Music	"404 (New Era)"	Won	
MAMA Awards	2025	Artist of the Year	KiiiKiii	Nominated	
MAMA Awards	2025	Best New Artist	KiiiKiii	Nominated	
MAMA Awards	2025	Fans' Choice Top 10 – Female	KiiiKiii	Nominated	
MAMA Awards	2026	Best Dance Performance – Female Group	"404 (New Era)"	Nominated	
MAMA Awards	2026	Fans' Choice Top 10 – Female	KiiiKiii	Nominated	
Melon Music Awards	2025	1theK Global Icon	KiiiKiii	Won	
Melon Music Awards	2025	Best Music Video	"I Do Me"	Won	
Melon Music Awards	2025	Berriz Global Fans' Choice	KiiiKiii	Nominated	
Melon Music Awards	2025	New Artist of the Year	KiiiKiii	Nominated	
Melon Music Awards	2025	Top 10 Artist	KiiiKiii	Nominated	
Melon Music Awards	2026	Artist of the Year	KiiiKiii	Nominated	
Melon Music Awards	2026	Top 10 Artist	KiiiKiii	Won	
Melon Music Awards	2026	Best Female Group	KiiiKiii	Nominated	
Melon Music Awards	2026	Song of the Year	"404 (New Era)"	Nominated	
Melon Music Awards	2026	Album of the Year	Delulu Pack	Nominated	
Melon Music Awards	2026	Best Performance – Female	KiiiKiii	Won	
Melon Music Awards	2026	Best Music Style	KiiiKiii	Won	
Seoul Music Awards	2025	Rookie of the Year	KiiiKiii	Won	
Seoul Music Awards	2026	Main Award (Bonsang)	KiiiKiii	Won	
SPOTV K-pop Awards	2026	Artist of the Year (Bonsang)	KiiiKiii	Won	
SPOTV K-pop Awards	2026	Song of the Year	"404 (New Era)"	Won	
TikTok Awards Korea	2025	New Rising Artist Award	KiiiKiii	Won	
TMElive International Music Awards	2026	Melon Music Choice	KiiiKiii	Won	

=== State and cultural honors ===
Name of country or organization, year given, and name of honor
Country or organization	Year	Honor	Ref.
Newsis K-Expo Cultural Awards (Note: Co-sponsored by Korea's Ministry of Culture, Sports and Tourism, Ministry of Trade, Industry, and Energy, Korea Communications Commission, and Korea Creative Content Agency, it awards cultural icons and businesses that promote the sustainability of the Korean Wave and boost the industry's competitiveness.)	2025	Seoul Tourism Foundation CEO Award	

=== Listicles ===
Name of publisher, year listed, name of listicle, and placement
Publisher	Year	Listicle	Placement	Ref.
NME	2026	The NME 100	Placed	
Rolling Stone	2025	The Future 25	Placed	
