= Error (Lee Chan-hyuk album) =

- Digital cover

Studio album by Lee Chan-hyuk
- Released: October 17, 2022
- Genres: EDM; R&B; gospel; ballad
- Length: 41:55
- Language: Korean
- Labels: YG; YG Plus
- Producer: Lee Chan-hyuk

Lee Chan-hyuk chronology
Error (2022)	Umbrella (2023)

Singles from Error
- 1. "Panorama" Released: October 17, 2022

Professional ratings
Review scores
Source	Rating
IZM	4/5 stars
NME	5/5 stars

Error is the debut studio album by South Korean singer Lee Chan-hyuk, a member of sibling duo AKMU. It was released on October 17, 2022, through YG Entertainment. The album consists of eleven tracks, including the lead single "Panorama", and centered on the theme of death.

== Background ==
On October 6, 2022, YG Entertainment announced that Lee would release his first album as a soloist, titled Error, on October 17.

== Accolades ==
Awards and nominations
Year	Awards ceremony	Category	Nominee	Result
2023	20th Korean Music Awards	Best Pop Song	"Panorama"	Nominated
2023	20th Korean Music Awards	Best Pop Album	Error	Won

== Track listing ==
All lyrics are written by Lee Chan-hyuk; all music is composed by Lee, Millennium, Sihwang; all tracks are produced by Lee.

No.	Title	Length
1.	"Eyewitness Account" (목격담)	2:57
2.	"Siren"	2:58
3.	"Panorama" (파노라마)	3:18
4.	"Time! Stop!"	3:44
5.	"If I Can't Go See You Right Now" (당장 널 만나러 가지 않으면)	3:36
6.	"Goodbye, Stay Well" (마지막 인사; featuring Chungha)	3:52
7.	"What The" (뭐가)	3:11
8.	"Missed Call" (부재중 전화)	5:08
9.	"Castle in My Dream" (내 꿈의 성)	4:14
10.	"A Day"	3:36
11.	"Funeral Hope" (장례희망)	5:21
Total length:		41:55

== Charts ==
Chart performance for Error
Chart (2022)	Peak position
South Korean Albums (Circle)	56

== Release history ==
Release history and formats for Error
Region	Date	Format	Label	Ref.
Various	October 17, 2022	Digital download; streaming; CD	YG; YG Plus	
