= Eros (Lee Chan-hyuk album) =

- Digital cover

Studio album by Lee Chan-hyuk
- Released: July 14, 2025
- Genre: Dance-pop; R&B; pop rock; ballad
- Length: 35:03
- Language: Korean
- Label: YG; YG Plus
- Producer: Lee Chan-hyuk

Lee Chan-hyuk chronology
Umbrella (2023)	Eros (2025)

Singles from Eros
- 1. "Vivid LaLa Love" Released: July 14, 2025; 2. "Endangered Love" Released: July 14, 2025

Professional ratings
Review scores
Source	Rating
IZM	4/5 stars

Eros is the second studio album by South Korean singer Lee Chan-hyuk, a member of sibling duo AKMU. It was released on July 14, 2025, through YG Entertainment. The album consists of ten tracks, centered on the topic of 'the death of others', and the various emotions encountered therefrom.

== Background ==
On June 30, 2025, YG Entertainment announced that Lee would release his second studio album as a soloist, titled Eros, on July 14.

== Accolades ==
Awards and nominations
Year	Awards ceremony	Category	Nominee	Result
2026	23rd Korean Music Awards	Song of the Year	"Endangered Love"	Won
2026	23rd Korean Music Awards	Best Pop Song	"Endangered Love"	Won
2026	23rd Korean Music Awards	Album of the Year	Eros	Nominated
2026	23rd Korean Music Awards	Best Pop Album	Eros	Won

== Track listing ==
All lyrics are written by Lee Chan-hyuk; all music is composed by Lee, Millennium, Sihwang; all tracks are produced by Lee.

No.	Title	Length
1.	"SINNY SINNY"	3:39
2.	"Out of My Mind" (돌아버렸어)	3:15
3.	"Vivid LaLa Love" (비비드라라러브)	4:00
4.	"TV Show"	3:29
5.	"Endangered Love" (멸종위기사랑)	3:40
6.	"Eve"	5:00
7.	"Andrew"	3:47
8.	"TAIL" (꼬리)	4:09
9.	"Castle in My Dream" (내 꿈의 성)	4:14
10.	"Shining Ground" (빛나는 세상)	3:59
Total length:		35:03

== Charts ==
Chart performance for Eros
Chart (2025)	Peak position
South Korean Albums (Circle)	60

== Release history ==
Release history and formats for Eros
Region	Date	Format	Label	Ref.
Various	July 14, 2025	Digital download; streaming; CD	YG; YG Plus	
