= Effie (musician) =

South Korean pop musician

- Born: Kim Na-hyun; November 2, 2002 (age 23); Busan, South Korea
- Occupation: Musician
- Musical career
- Genre: Hyperpop
- Years active: 2019–present
- Labels: Sound Republica; A Mass Culture

Kim Na-hyun (Korean: 김나현), better known by the stage name Effie, is a hyperpop musician from South Korea. She began releasing music independently on SoundCloud in 2019, while still in high school.

== Career ==
Effie released her first EP, Neon Genesis, at the age of 18, after being inspired by the music of Drain Gang. Effie, and the release of this EP, have been associated with the birth of South Korea's "sad girl movement". Effie released her debut album E on March 28, 2025. The title of the album pays homage to Ecco2k's album of the same name.

In August 2025, she released the EP Pullup to Busan 4 More Hyper Summer It’s Gonna Be a Fuckin Movie, which was met with critical acclaim. Pitchfork gave the EP a 7.6/10, saying Effie's performance "oozes personality". Jon Caramanica of the New York Times ranked the EP as the best album of 2025.

== Discography ==
=== Studio albums ===
- E (2025)

=== Extended plays ===
- Neon Genesis (2021)
- Pullup to Busan 4 More Hyper Summer It’s Gonna Be a Fuckin Movie (2025)

== Accolades ==
=== Awards and nominations ===
Name of the award ceremony, year presented, category, nominee(s) of the award, and the result of the nomination
Award ceremony	Year	Category	Nominee(s)	Result	Ref.
Korean Music Awards	2026	Musician of the Year	Effie	Nominated	
Korean Music Awards	2026	Album of the Year	Pullup to Busan 4 More Hyper Summer It's Gonna Be a Fuckin Movie	Nominated	
Korean Music Awards	2026	Best Hip-Hop Album	Pullup to Busan 4 More Hyper Summer It's Gonna Be a Fuckin Movie	Nominated	
Korean Music Awards	2026	Best Hip-Hop Song	"Can I Sip" (담배)	Nominated	
Korean Music Awards	2026	Best Electronic Album	E	Nominated	
Korean Music Awards	2026	Best Electronic Song	"Open Ur Eyes"	Nominated	

=== Listicles ===
Name of publisher, year listed, name of listicle, and placement
Publisher	Year	Listicle	Placement	Ref.
NME	2026	The NME 100	Placed	
