= Green Flame Boys =

South Korean punk rock band

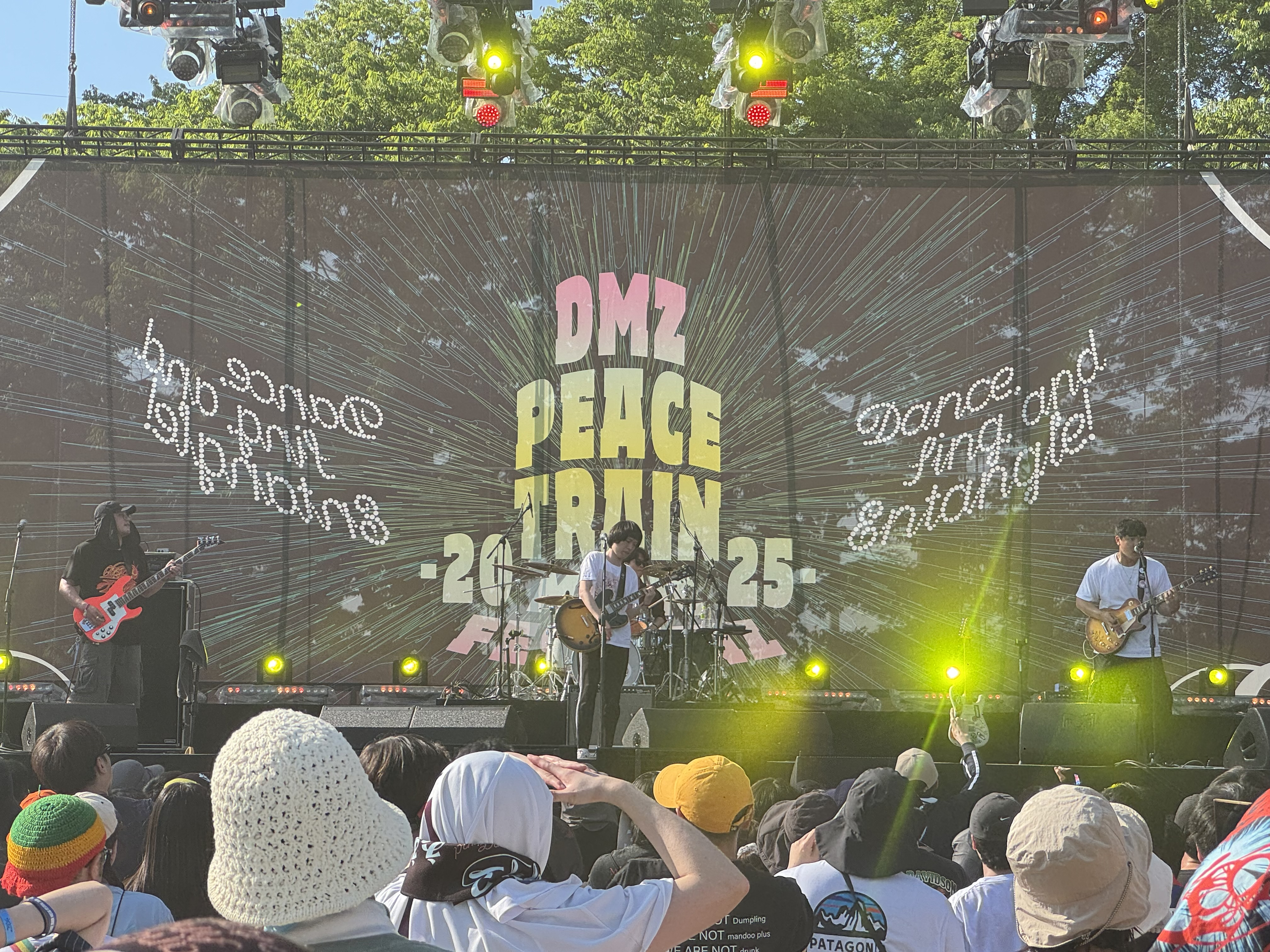
- Green Flame Boys at DMZ Peace Train Music Festival 2025

Background information
- Origin: Seoul, South Korea
- Genres: Pop punk; Punk rock
- Years active: 2012-present
- Label: Poclanos
- Members: Cho Kicheol; Yang Jeonghyeon; Lee Jaewoong; Lee Woojin

Green Flame Boys (Korean: 초록불꽃소년단) is a South Korean punk rock band. As of 2023, the band consists of Cho Kicheol, Yang Jeonghyeon, Lee Jaewoong and Lee Woojin. Since their formation in 2012, the band has released the studio albums Greenroom (2017), Greenbridge (2022) and Greenroof (2025).

== History ==
Green Flame Boys were formed in 2012 by Cho Kicheol and Yang Jeonghyeon. Yang Jeonghyeon and Cho Kicheol met for the first time each other at the rock festival, and they were the same ex-members of the band Cheolnam in 2010. Their band name is derived from an Italy fairy tale of the same name. In 2015, they released an EP She Was Just A Cute Tsubomi (그저 귀여운 츠보미였는 걸). The single is a song about Japanese adult actress Tsubomi. In 2017, they released their first studio album, Greenroom on The Valiant.

In 2022, they released their second studio album Greenbridge, which received good criticisms. Visla Magazine described the album as an experienced performance melting the right strength and weakness for each track in the right place. In 2023, they performed at the Keunsori Festival with Fishing Girls, Walking After You, 2Z, Badram, and Deluxe X Deluxe, which hosted by Korea Popular Music Culture Promotion Association. They won third place in the 2023 Pentaport Rock Festival Super Rookie Competition, and they performed at the festival.

In 2025, they released their third studio album Greenroof.

== Discography ==
=== Studio albums ===
- Greenroom (2017)
- Greenbridge (2022)
- Greenroof (2025)

=== EPs ===
- She Was Just A Cute Tsubomi (그저 귀여운 츠보미였는 걸) (2015)
