= Greenbridge (album) =

Studio album by Green Flame Boys
- Released: September 23, 2022
- Genre: Punk rock
- Length: 44:39
- Label: Poclanos
- Producer: Green Flame Boys

Green Flame Boys chronology
| Greenroom (2017) | Greenbridge (2022) |

Greenbridge is the second studio album by South Korean punk band Green Flame Boys. The album was released on 23 September 2022.

== Background ==
Through EP 2015 and debut studio album Greenroom (2017), Green Flame Boys gained popularity by performing in underground punk venues. The album is described as a work that expresses a more mature development from boy to adult.

== Critical reception ==
Jeong Imyong of Visla Magazine described the album as an album that contains sound that penetrates taste in a formal way, unique honest lyrics, and the images that punk kids loved. Chris P of Korean Indie reviewed "Tracks of Greenbridge are tighter and polished along with a clear distinction between the verses."

== Track listing ==
| No. | Title | Length |
|---|---|---|
| 1. | "Up Down Paradise 3" ("업다운파라다이스 3") | 0:47 |
| 2. | "I Want to Make Song for You" | 1:22 |
| 3. | "DD" | 2:21 |
| 4. | "Blue Sky" ("푸른 하늘") (featuring Saewoo Yoo) | 2:16 |
| 5. | "Haruka Sukida" ("はるか好きだ") | 1:16 |
| 6. | "We Don't Give Up" | 1:37 |
| 7. | "F**king Teenage Boys" | 1:30 |
| 8. | "Duodenum" ("그 아이의 십이지장 만지고파") | 2:03 |
| 9. | "Up Down Paradise 2" ("업다운파라다이스 2") | 0:35 |
| 10. | "Better Tomorrow with Smile" ("내일은 조금 더 미소 짓기를") | 4:43 |
| 11. | "Tokyo Motel" ("동경모텔") | 3:16 |
| 12. | "The Day We Can Meet Again" ("다시 만날 수 있는 날") | 3:47 |
| 13. | "Suicide Boy" ("자살소년") | 3:37 |
| 14. | "A Midwinter's Night Dream" ("한 겨울밤의 꿈") | 5:24 |
| 15. | "Mommy" ("엄마") | 5:08 |
| 16. | "If Our Song Goes to You" ("우리의 노래가 그 애한테 간다면") | 3:00 |
| 17. | "Green Flame Boys" ("초록불꽃소년단") | 1:57 |
