= Perfect Crown =

2026 South Korean television series

- Promotional poster
- Also known as: Wife of a 21st Century Grand Prince
- Hangul: 21세기 대군부인
- Hanja: 21世紀 大君夫人
- Lit.: The 21st Century Grand Prince's Wife
- RR: 21segi daegunbuin
- MR: 21segi taegunbuin
- Genre: Romantic comedy
- Written by: Yoo Ji-won
- Directed by: Park Joon-hwa; Bae Hee-young
- Starring: IU; Byeon Woo-seok; Noh Sang-hyun; Gong Seung-yeon
- Music by: Kim Tae-seung; Choi Jung-in
- Opening theme: "My Pace" by Bibi
- Country of origin: South Korea
- Original language: Korean
- No. of episodes: 12

Production
- Executive producers: Jang Se-jung; Kim Jae-bok; Kim Min-ji
- Producers: Lee Dae-yong; Park Ji-hye
- Cinematography: Bae Hyun-jin; Kim Yong-min; Kim Hwa-young; Son Hwa-young
- Editor: Yoon Soo-min
- Running time: 72–73 minutes
- Production companies: MBC; Kakao Entertainment
- Budget: ₩30 billion

Original release
- Network: MBC TV
- Release: April 10 – May 16, 2026

Perfect Crown (Korean: 21세기 대군부인) is a South Korean romantic comedy television series written by Yoo Ji-won, and directed by Park Joon-hwa and Bae Hee-young, and starring IU, Byeon Woo-seok, Noh Sang-hyun, and Gong Seung-yeon. The series follows the marriage contract between an illegitimate chaebol heir and a Grand Prince in a fictional 21st-century constitutional monarchy. As the couple navigates political opposition from the Queen Dowager and the Prime Minister, their transactional alliance evolves into a romance focused on challenging institutional hierarchies.

Produced by MBC and Kakao Entertainment, principal photography took place throughout South Korea from May 2025. The series aired on MBC TV from April 10, to May 16, 2026, every Friday and Saturday at 21:40 (KST), and was made available for streaming on Disney+. It achieved strong domestic ratings, peaking at 13.8% nationwide, and became Disney+'s most-watched South Korean series globally with over 43 million viewing hours.

The series received mixed reviews from critics, who praised its visual presentation and production design but criticized its script, character development, and the lead performances by IU and Byeon. The drama also generated significant controversy in South Korea over alleged historical inaccuracies in its depiction of royal rituals and costumes, which some critics linked to Chinese tributary-state protocols. Following a public petition to the National Assembly that surpassed 50,000 signatures, the production team issued public apologies, edited the content for broadcast and Disney+, and canceled the physical Blu-ray release.

== Synopsis ==
Set in a 21st-century constitutional monarchy, Seong Hui-ju is a wealthy chaebol heir who seeks to overcome the social stigma of her commoner, out-of-wedlock status by proposing a marriage contract to Grand Prince I-an. While I-an faces political pressure from Queen dowager Yoon Yi-rang to marry and stifle rumors of his ambition for the throne, his union with Hui-ju meets intense backlash from the royal family, Prime Minister Min Jeong-woo, and a skeptical public. As the couple navigates rigid palace protocols and physical threats directed at Hui-ju, their transactional alliance gradually transforms into a genuine romance, centered on their shared struggle to dismantle social hierarchies and protect one another from institutional constraints.

== Cast and characters ==
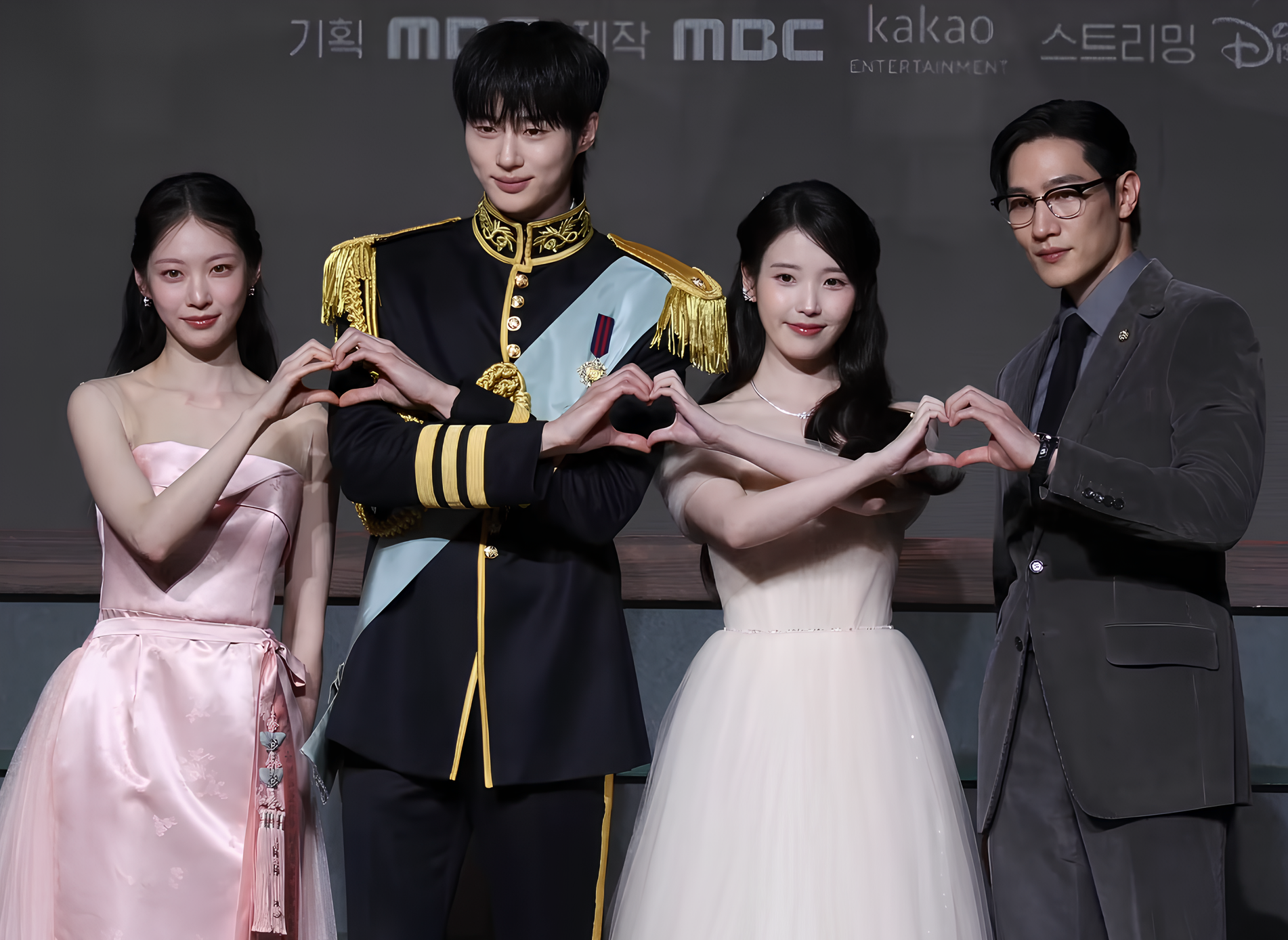
The cast of Perfect Crown in costume (L to R): Gong Seung-yeon, Byeon Woo-seok, IU, and Noh Sang-hyun

=== Main ===
- IU as Seong Hui-ju
  - Park So-eun as young Hui-ju

The CEO of Castle Beauty and daughter of the Castle Group founder, she has managed her company without any failed ventures. Despite her professional record and family wealth, her status as an illegitimate child of commoner descent leads to social exclusion within the marriage market. She prioritizes merit over social status and frequently competes against elite peers. In an effort to secure an advantageous marriage, she targets Grand Prince I-an who she encounters at a royal banquet.

- Byeon Woo-seok as Grand Prince I-an
  - Lee Su-ho as young I-an

The younger brother of the late King I-hwan and regent for his eight-year-old nephew I-yun; I-an was a competitive young man whose public persona became more reserved after his father, King Hui-jong, frequently altered his royal titles to limit his political influence. Following his brother's death, his rise to power led to public comparisons with the historical Grand Prince Suyang. His monotonous life is disrupted by his encounter with Hui-ju at a royal banquet.

- Noh Sang-hyun as Min Jeong-woo

The eldest son of Min family, prominent for producing multiple Prime Ministers, he is perceived as a desirable marriage candidate due to his position as the Prime Minister of Korea. He balances his political duties with his lifestyle of collecting high-value automobiles and footwear with personal interests such as cooking at traditional markets. His political career is characterized by shifting allegiances between establishment and reformist factions, resulting in public labels such as "migratory bird". While he shares a long-standing friendship with I-an, the relationship faces strain due to I-an's relationship with Hui-ju.

- Gong Seung-yeon as Yoon Yi-rang

The Queen dowager of the late King I-hwan; the Queen mother of the current King I-yun, and a member of the Yoon family, which has produced four queens, she was educated to maintain the conduct expected of a royal consort.

=== Supporting ===
Grand Prince I-an's private residence

- Yoo Su-bin as Choi Hyeon, a loyal aide to Grand Prince I-an
- Choi Ji-su as Lee A-reum, a spy stationed at Grand Prince I-an's private residence
- Lee Si-hun as Kim Yeong-mun, the steward of Grand Prince I-an's private residence.
- Jung Ji-an as Kim Yeong-seon, the primary manager of Grand Prince I-an's private residence
- Jin Se-rim as Yoo Ji-soo, a servant in Grand Prince I-an's private residence

Secretariat of Castle Beauty

- Lee Yeon as Do Hye-jeong, Hui-ju's chief secretary
- Park Ji-ye as Park Seung-hee, a staff at Castle Beauty
- Jeong I-an as Im Joo-ho, a staff at Castle Beauty
- Yoon Sul-ah as Jung Ye-rin, a staff at Castle Beauty

People of Castle Group

- Cho Seung-yun as Seong Yeong-guk, the Chairman of Castle Group and Hui-ju's father
- Lee Jae-won as Seong Tae-ju, the eldest son of Castle Group and Hui-ju's older brother
  - Kim Geon-u as young Seong Tae-ju
- Chae Seo-an as Han Da-yeong, Tae-ju's wife

People of the Royal Palace

- Sung Joon as I-hwan (special appearance), the previous King and I-an's deceased older brother
- Kim Eun-ho as I-yun, the current King and I-hwan's son
- Park Jun-myun as Choi Jin-suk, a court lady of Anhwa Hall
- Lee Chae-kyung as Im Sun-hwa, the Queen Dowager's court lady
- Kim Soo-jin as Jung Mi-hee, the head court lady

Others

- Jo Jae-yoon as Yoon Sung-won, the head of the royal court and the head of the Yoon family, who is the father of Queen Mother.
- Kim Jung-woon as Jo Min-young, Chief of Staff to the Prime Minister's office

=== Special appearances ===
- Son Jun-ho as King Hui-jong, I-an and I-hwan's late father
- Yoon Byung-hee as the PR manager of Castle Beauty
- Im Chul-soo as the sales manager of Castle Beauty
- Kim Dae-gon as the logistics manager of Castle Beauty
- Kim Dae-ho as a reporter
- Heo Nam-jun as Kim Yeon-jun, Hui-ju's blind date
- Kim So-hyun as Queen Ui-hyeon, I-an's late mother

== Production ==
=== Development ===
In December 2024, MBC and Kakao Entertainment announced the production of Perfect Crown, a contemporary romance series set within an alternative-reality South Korean constitutional monarchy. Developed from a script written by Yoo Ah-in which won at the 2022 MBC Drama Screenplay Contest, the project was planned by Kang Dae-seon, directed by Park Joon-hwa, who helmed Alchemy of Souls (2022–23), and Bae Hee-young, while Yoo Ji-won served as screenwriter. Costumes were designed by Cho Sang-kyung, who previously worked on Oldboy, The Handmaiden, and The Royal Tailor. The total budget of the series is ₩30 billion.

A 30-chapter prequel web novel written by Yoo and featuring the characters during high school will be serialized on Kakao Page starting on May 16, 2026.

=== Casting ===
In December 2024, Kakao Entertainment confirmed that IU and Byeon Woo-seok would star in the series. Three months after the confirmation, TV Daily reported that IU and Byeon would be leaving due to scheduling conflicts, but it was denied by their agencies. In April 2025, Noh Sang-hyun and Gong Seung-yeon were cast following IU and Byeon. In June 2025, Yoo Su-bin, Lee Yeon, and Chae Seo-an also joined the cast.

=== Filming ===
Principal photography commenced in May 2025. The series was filmed at Mujinjeong Pavilion in Haman, South Gyeongsang Province; Manhyujeong Pavillion in Andong, Yecheon Jinho International Archery Field in Yeosu, Dangnamli Island in Yeoju, Awon Museum and Hotel in North Jeolla Province, Oreung, Gyeongbokgung, Haenggung Palace at the Hwaseong Fortress in Suwon, and the Baekje Cultural Land, among others, as well as a large set in Socho-myeon, Wonju, which was demolished after filming concluded.

== Original soundtrack ==
Perfect Crown OST Special

Soundtrack album by Various artists
- Released: May 16, 2026
- Genre: Soundtrack
- Language: Korean
- Label: Kakao Entertainment

Produced, planned and distributed by Kakao Entertainment, the original soundtrack for Perfect Crown featured an 11-artist lineup including K-pop groups Riize, BoyNextDoor, and KiiiKiii, alongside soloists Bibi, Woodz, Sam Kim, So Su-bin, and Hanroro. The soundtrack also incorporates contributions from indie and alternative acts Aleph, Hrtz.wav, and Im Joong-won of Solnmor. According to Kakao Entertainment, the musical production was designed to leverage their internal IP value chain by featuring artists from their various subsidiary labels to enhance the series' narrative themes. The tracks were sequentially released following the drama's premiere on April 10, 2026. The full soundtrack was released in digital format on May 16, 2026 while the physical format is slated for a June 4, 2026 release. It contains the 11 previously released vocal tracks, Aleph's unreleased new song "Already Free," as well as 44 score tracks, for a total of 56 tracks.

Part 1

All lyrics are written by Noah; all music is composed by Beltiger.

Released on April 10, 2026
No.	Title	Artist	Length
1.	"My Pace"	Bibi	2:46
2.	"My Pace" (Inst.)		2:46
Total length:			5:32

Part 2

All lyrics are written by 4bout; all music is composed by 4bout, Kime, and Hwan.

Released on April 11, 2026
No.	Title	Artist	Length
1.	"Go On"	KiiiKiii	2:48
2.	"Go On" (Inst.)		2:48
Total length:			5:34

Part 3

All lyrics are written by 4bout; all music is composed by 4bout, Himo, Echez, and Hwan.

Released on April 17, 2026
No.	Title	Artist	Length
1.	"No Doubt"	BoyNextDoor	3:44
2.	"No Doubt" (Inst.)		3:44
Total length:			7:28

Part 4

All lyrics are written by Park Woo-sang (Logos); all music is composed by Park Woo-sang and Seo9 (Logos).

Released on April 18, 2026
No.	Title	Artist	Length
1.	"Behind the Shine"	Riize	3:15
2.	"Behind the Shine" (Inst.)		3:15
Total length:			6:30

Part 5

All lyrics are written by 4bout; all music is composed by 4bout, Himo, Kime, Hwan, and Dew.

Released on April 24, 2026
No.	Title	Artist	Length
1.	"Our Goodbye" (안녕)	Hanroro	3:02
2.	"Our Goodbye" (안녕; Inst.)		3:02
Total length:			6:04

Part 6

All lyrics are written by Junha (Galactika *), Friday. (Galactika *), and Ogi (Galactika *); all music is composed by Woobin (Galactika *), Junha, and Lee Dong-wan (Galactika *).

Released on April 25, 2026
No.	Title	Artist	Length
1.	"Everglow"	Woodz	4:10
2.	"Everglow" (Inst.)		4:10
Total length:			8:10

Part 7

All lyrics are written by Lee Hyung-eun, Choi Sang-eon, and Choi Seok-hwan; all music is composed by Choi Seok-hwan and Choi Sang-eon.

Released on May 1, 2026
No.	Title	Artist	Length
1.	"My Favorite Part"	So Su-bin	2:43
2.	"My Favorite Part" (Inst.)		2:43
Total length:			5:26

Part 8

All lyrics are written by Heo Sung-jin; all music is composed by Heo Sung-jin.

Released on May 2, 2026
No.	Title	Artist	Length
1.	"You Keep Me Here"	Hrtz.wav	3:44
2.	"You Keep Me Here" (Inst.)		3:44
Total length:			7:28

Part 9

All lyrics are written by Lee Song and Hwang Yu-bin of XYXX; all music is composed by Moon Kim (Room01) and Smob.

Released on May 8, 2026
No.	Title	Artist	Length
1.	"If You Were My World" (네가 나의 세상이라면)	Sam Kim	3:18
2.	"If You Were My World" (네가 나의 세상이라면; Inst.)		3:18
Total length:			6:36

Part 10

All lyrics are written by Im Joong-won; all music is composed by Im Joong-won.

Released on May 9, 2026
No.	Title	Artist	Length
1.	"In Your Orbit" (사랑하는 법이 틀렸나요)	Im Joong-won	4:38
2.	"In Your Orbit" (사랑하는 법이 틀렸나요; Inst.)		4:38
Total length:			9:16

Part 11

All lyrics are written by Midnight; all music is composed by Midnight.

Released on May 15, 2026
No.	Title	Artist	Length
1.	"Fate Line" (평행선)	Byeon Woo-seok	3:38
2.	"Fate Line" (평행선; Inst.)		3:38
Total length:			8:16

== Release ==
Perfect Crown was originally slated to premiere on MBC TV in the second half of 2025. In November 2025, Disney+ unveiled that the series would also be available to stream on their platform. In January 2026, Perfect Crown was reported for an April 3 broadcast. It was then postponed by a week, and started airing on April 10 in MBC's Friday–Saturday timeslot at 21:40 (KST).

== Reception ==
=== Critical response ===
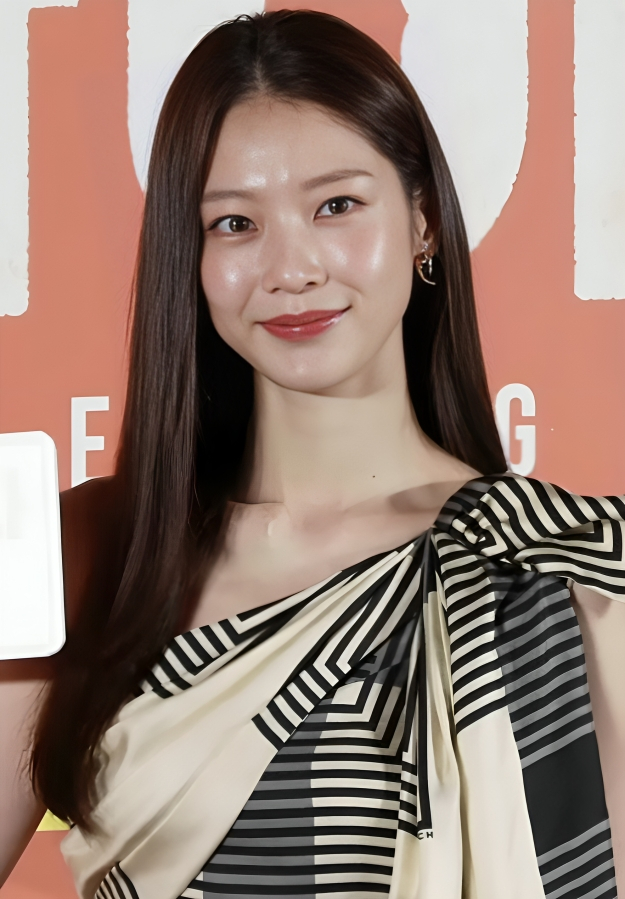
Gong Seung-yeon received praise for her portrayal of Queen Dowager Yoon Yi-rang.

Perfect Crown received mixed reviews. While the production design and visual presentation were praised, critics highlighted issues with the script's predictability and character development. Bhavna Agarwal of India Today described the series as "all glitter, little gold", praising its visual presentation while criticizing its writing as "weightless" and reliant on established romantic tropes. Pierce Conran of the South China Morning Post similarly wrote that, despite high production values and a strong premise, the series "fails to immerse" due to characters that do not "feel like real people". Joel Keller of Decider noted that the narrative follows a predictable structure typical of K-dramas, adding that its extended episode length accentuates this aspect. Writing for Opinion News, Kang Dae-ho characterized the series as a "pre-modern fantasy" that emphasizes visual spectacle and hierarchical wish-fulfillment over realism. In contrast, Yu Ji-hye of JTBC gave a more favorable assessment, stating that the series' romantic appeal is enhanced by the leads' chemistry and direction despite its familiar premise. Historian Arius Raposas from Medium provided a more balanced view of the series, praising its ability to "weave together themes in an overarching romantic comedy scheme" as a "grand experiment" that apparently worked for its viewers, while also placing a premium on an "acceptable level of historical liberties." In framing his review from the lens of history and public administration, Raposas likened the narrative to an attempt of undertaking a "revolution from the center", wherein the greatest beneficiary of the plot turns out to be the protagonist Seong Hui-ju herself. Raposas also made an attempt to trace the chronological reference of the series.

Responses to the lead performances were divided. Conran described Byeon Woo-seok's character as "dull" and limited by the writing, while noting that the role does not allow for a fully developed portrayal. Reports from News1 and other Korean media cited viewer criticism regarding emotional delivery and on-screen chemistry between IU and Byeon. Commentary on IU's performance varied: Conran wrote that her portrayal at times appeared "caricature[d]", whereas Ahn Byung-gil of Sports Kyunghyang credited her with effectively leading the drama through tonal range.

Supporting performances received more consistently positive attention. Gong Seung-yeon was identified by several outlets as a standout, with OSEN noting her "charisma" and Star Today highlighting her screen presence. Critics also responded positively to Chae Seo-an, citing her portrayal of an antagonistic role as contributing to the series' dramatic balance.

In a survey conducted by Joy News 24 to mark its 22nd anniversary, 142 entertainment industry professionals, including employees from entertainment agencies and broadcasting companies, film and broadcast content producers, and entertainment reporters, ranked Perfect Crown as the worst drama of 2026, with 45 votes, placing it well ahead of other titles. The survey highlighted criticism of the script, direction, lead performances, and the historical controversy surrounding the series.

=== Viewership ===
According to Nielsen Korea, the premiere of Perfect Crown recorded a 7.8% nationwide rating and an 8.2% rating in the Seoul metropolitan area, ranking first among MBC Friday–Saturday dramas and the 20–54 demographic. This figure marked the third-highest premiere rating for a Friday–Saturday drama, following Chief Detective 1958 (10.1%) and Knight Flower (7.9%). The first episode alone also recorded 22.25 million cumulative viewers in one day, including reruns. The series demonstrated a rapid upward trend, surpassing the double-digit mark in its fourth episode with a nationwide rating of 11.1% and a metropolitan area rating of 11.3%. The finale episode on May 16 recorded an average ratings of 13.8% nationwide and 14.1% in metropolitan area. It also became the third-highest rated Friday–Saturday drama in MBC history, following Knight Flower with 18.4% and The Red Sleeve with 17.4%.

On Disney+, the series became the platform's most-viewed Korean drama premiere globally. It achieved the highest viewership for a Korean drama within five days of its launch and entered the platform's Global Top 10, charting in more than 40 countries. On May 15, 2026, Disney+ announced that Perfect Crown had become the most-watched South Korean series of their catalogue with a global cumulative viewing time of over 43 million hours; episode 8 also saw a record 43% increase in viewership over episode 1.

Perfect Crown : South Korea viewers per episode (millions)

Season	Episode number												Average
Season	1	2	3	4	5	6	7	8	9	10	11	12	Average
1	1.548	1.913	1.749	2.226	2.014	2.301	2.134	2.353	2.309	2.666	2.591	2.671	2.206

Source: Audience measurement performed nationwide by Nielsen Korea.

Average TV viewership ratings
Ep.	Original broadcast date	Average audience share (Nielsen Korea)	
Ep.	Original broadcast date	Nationwide	Seoul
1	April 10, 2026	7.8% (2nd)	8.2% (1st)
2	April 11, 2026	9.5% (2nd)	10.1% (2nd)
3	April 17, 2026	9.0% (1st)	9.4% (1st)
4	April 18, 2026	11.1% (2nd)	11.3% (2nd)
5	April 24, 2026	10.6% (1st)	10.9% (1st)
6	April 25, 2026	11.2% (2nd)	11.3% (1st)
7	May 1, 2026	10.8% (1st)	11.1% (1st)
8	May 2, 2026	11.2% (2nd)	11.6% (2nd)
9	May 8, 2026	11.7% (1st)	11.9% (1st)
10	May 9, 2026	13.3% (1st)	13.5% (1st)
11	May 15, 2026	13.5% (1st)	13.5% (1st)
12	May 16, 2026	13.8% (1st)	14.1% (1st)
Average		11.1%	11.4%
In the table above, the blue numbers represent the lowest ratings and the red numbers represent the highest ratings.

== Controversy ==
After the airing of episode 11 on May 15, 2026, the series faced significant backlash in South Korea over alleged historical inaccuracies in the coronation scene of Grand Prince I-an (played by Byeon Woo-seok). Critics highlighted that the character wore a guryu myeollyugwan (a coronet with nine strings of beads), traditionally associated with tributary kings under Chinese imperial protocol, rather than the sibi myeollyugwan (twelve strings) reserved for independent sovereigns. Officials in the scene also used the exclamation "cheonse" (천세; 千歲, "live a thousand years") instead of "manse" (만세; 萬歲, "live ten thousand years"), the phrase historically reserved for independent Korean monarchs.

Additional criticisms focused on other details, including tea ceremony scenes that some viewers argued resembled Chinese rather than traditional Korean etiquette, and portrayals of royal hierarchy (such as a queen dowager kneeling before a grand prince) that were seen as inconsistent with Joseon court customs. Many commentators argued that these elements, combined with the coronation details, inadvertently echoed protocols of tributary states and could lend credibility to China's Northeast Project, which claims parts of ancient Korean history as Chinese. Although the drama is set in a fictional 21st-century constitutional monarchy that diverges from historical Joseon, detractors maintained that the lack of clear distinction from historical practices constituted historical distortion.

Public figures and experts, including history lecturer Choi Tae-sung and professor Seo Kyung-deok, publicly criticized the production for insufficient historical verification, with some arguing that the scenes risked providing material for Chinese historical claims. Director Park Joon-hwa later described the issues as a "failure of imagination," stating that historical consultants had described Joseon-style protocols (including the nine-string crown) but that the team should have adapted the depiction to reflect the Korean Empire period given the drama's alternate-history premise of a continuously sovereign monarchy.

On May 22, 2026, a public petition was filed on the National Assembly's electronic petition system, titled "Petition requesting the suspension of a drama accused of historical distortion and Northeast Project controversy, and the removal of its content from media platforms." The petition surpassed the required 50,000-signature threshold within days—reaching over 52,000 signatures by May 26—and was forwarded to the relevant standing committee for formal review. It demanded the complete removal of the series from all platforms and the implementation of institutional measures to prevent similar incidents.

In response, MBC edited the audio, subtitles, and scenes for reruns, VOD, and OTT platforms (including Disney+), and corrected the published script. The production team, director Park Joon-hwa, writer Yoo Ji-won, and lead actors IU and Byeon Woo-seok issued public apologies, acknowledging insufficient historical verification.

Citing the ongoing controversy, an official pop-up store closed early amid the backlash, and the production of the show's Blu-ray release, which had already opened pre-orders, was officially canceled on June 15, 2026, with full refunds issued to buyers.

On November 2, 2026, it was reported that a complaint regarding the historical accuracy controversy had been placed on the agenda of the Broadcast Review Subcommittee of the Broadcasting Media Communications Review Commission, scheduled to meet the following day. Depending on the subcommittee's decision, the matter could be closed with a finding of no violation, a recommendation, or an expression of opinion, or referred to the full commission for possible statutory sanctions such as a caution or warning. The subcommittee concluded the review with an expression of opinion, considering the violation minor and not worthy of sanctions.
