= Green bridge (filtration system) =

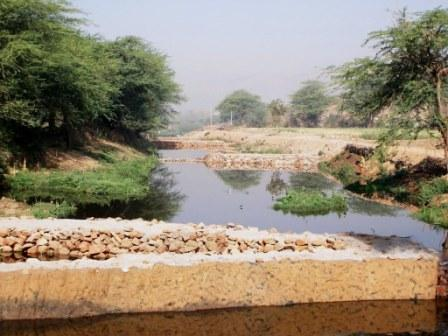
Green bridge system

Green bridges are an ecotechnological in-situ bio remediation system. Their different physical and biological filters work in combination to remove suspended and dissolved impurities of water. Green bridge filters help in reducing the suspended solids by filtration process, reducing Chemical Oxygen Demand (COD)/Biochemical Oxygen Demand (BOD) by aerobic degradation. Green Bridges also help in the restoration of ecological food chain.

== Development ==
Natural streams, rivers and lakes have their own in-built purification system which consists of natural slopes, stones for biological growth and complex food web help in the purification process. This food web is nothing but utilization of one's waste by another as its own food. Nature has her own living machinery of detritivorous microbes and other living species to consume wastes. These principles have been harnessed in the treatment of polluted streams.

Green bridges are developed using fibrous material with stones. All the floatable and suspended solids are trapped in this biological bridge and the turbidity of flowing water is reduced. Green plants on the bridges increase the DO level in water, which in turn facilitates the growth of aerobic organisms, which degrade organic pollutants. Sandeep Joshi, director, SERI (Shrishti Eco-Research Institute) has developed this technology and has received a patent for it.

== Benefits ==
- Capital expenditure is comparable with the annual operational cost of conventional bioremediation systems.
- Can be developed and operated in combination with conventional systems to improve the performance of the latter.
- Reduce the ecotoxicity of the man-made substances released into the water bodies and facilitate the eco-assimilation of those pollutants into the ecological cycles thus reducing the quantum of hazardous residues to zero which otherwise require costly secured landfill and incineration techniques.

=== Expected results ===
- Solids control: 40–80% reduction
- Pollution control: COD/BOD reduction – 40–90%
- Fecal coliforms control: 50–100% reduction
- Ecotoxicity: Nil
- Dissolved oxygen: Increased by 150% – 1200%
- Aquatic species:
  - Increase in plants/plankton – 200%
  - Increase in micro-invertebrates – 200%

Other than the changes in the water quality mentioned above a multifold change in population of avifauna, terrestrial plants along the riverbanks has been noticed. There is an overall odour and mosquito reduction and improvement of river aesthetics. Increase in health status of aquatic life in lentic-lotic system by reduction in ecotoxicity of pollutants.
