= Delulu =

Internet slang for "delusional"

Delulu (/dəˈluːluː/) is Internet slang for delusional, specifically for believing that one can influence one's destiny through sheer willpower. It was first used in K-pop communities for those in a parasocial relationship with celebrities, and who had hopes of meeting them. It was adopted by Generation Z and Generation Alpha, popularized by viral TikTok trends such as the catchphrase "delulu is the solulu", that is, self-confidence is key to achieving one's dreams, however far-fetched. Solulu and trululu are slang for "solution" and "truth", modeled after delulu.

== Origins ==
Derived from the word delusional, delulu originates in Internet communities obsessed with K-pop culture, such as the OneHallyu Forum active around 2013 and 2014. In these forums, delulu often mocked individuals who hoped, unrealistically, to meet a celebrity they idolized, a sign of a parasocial relationship with delusional beliefs. Users also often joked about being deluded themselves.

Delulu in K-pop culture is also used in the shipping and stan cultures for fans who interpret any interaction between celebrities as proof of their dating or being in a relationship.

== In popular culture ==
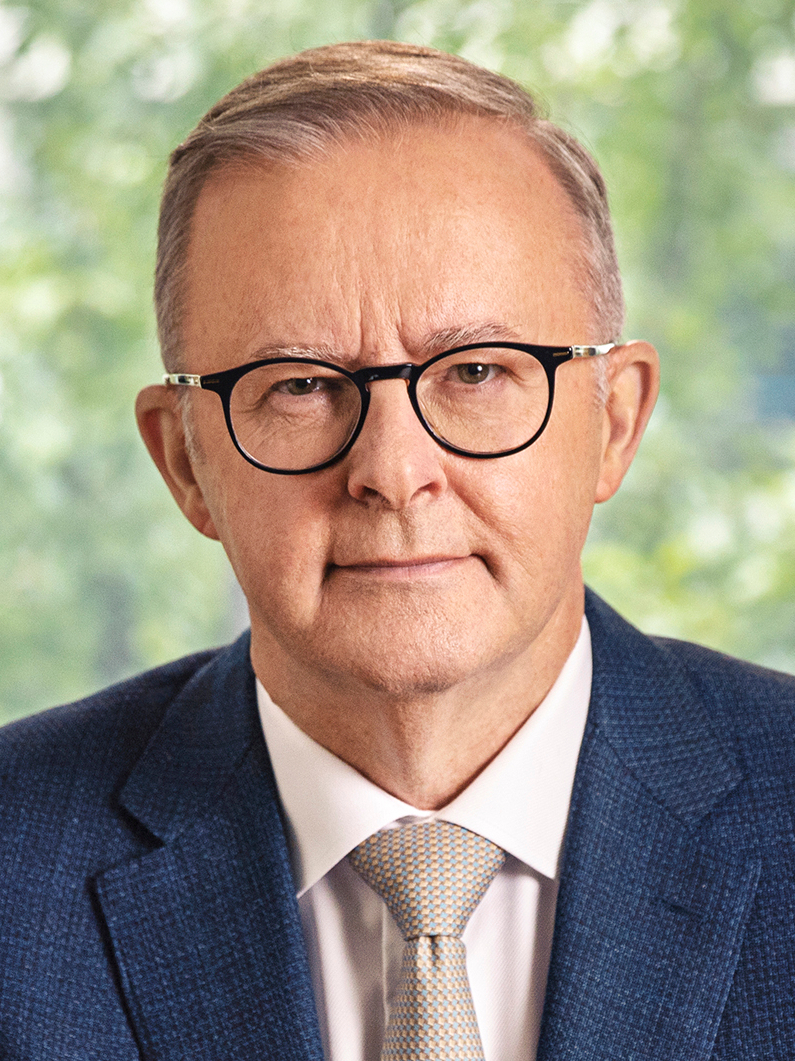
Prime Minister of Australia Anthony Albanese (official portrait pictured) criticised opposition policies as "delulu with no solulu" in Parliament (2025).

Since late 2022, delulu has spread virally to Generation Z and Generation Alpha on platforms like TikTok and Instagram. As of December 2023, TikTok had recorded over five billion views of the hashtag #delulu. Multiple creators have embraced delulu, often incorporating it in their short-form videos.

TikTok influencers coined the catchphrase "delulu is the solulu", implying that self-confidence is the solution to career decisions.

Despite its derogatory origins, delulu now often means that one can influence one's life through force of will, similarly to the "manifesting" movement promoted by Oprah Winfrey in the 2000s and the "fake it till you make it" aphorism of the 1970s.

In March 2025, during a parliamentary debate, Australian Prime Minister Anthony Albanese used delulu to criticise the opposition's economic and energy policies. The phrase "delulu with no solulu" was directed at the Liberal–National Coalition, implying that their approach was delusional and lacked solutions. Albanese's use was added to the on-line Cambridge Advanced Learner's Dictionary in 2025.

== See also ==
- Law of attraction (New Thought)
- Magical thinking
