= Delulu Pack =

- Digital cover

EP by KiiiKiii
- Released: January 26, 2026
- Length: 17:11
- Language: Korean
- Labels: Starship; Kakao

KiiiKiii chronology
Uncut Gem (2025)	Delulu Pack (2026)	WhyKiiiKiii (2026)

Singles from Delulu Pack
- 1. "To Me from Me" Released: November 4, 2025; 2. "404 (New Era)" Released: January 26, 2026

Professional ratings
Review scores
Source	Rating
IZM	3/5 stars

Delulu Pack is the second extended play by South Korean girl group KiiiKiii. It was released by Starship Entertainment on January 26, 2026, and contains six tracks, including the pre-release single "To Me from Me" and the lead single "404 (New Era)".

== Background and release ==
On January 1, 2026, Starship Entertainment announced that KiiiKiii would release new music at the end of the month. On January 6, upon the release of concept photos, it was confirmed that the group's second extended play Delulu Pack would be released on January 26. The track film for one of the tracks "Delulu" was released on January 12. Concept photos were released on January 13 and 16, when the lead single was confirmed to be titled "404 (New Era)". On January 18, a highlight medley video of the album's tracks was released, which confirmed that the song "To Me from Me", previously released in November 2025 as an OST, would be included. A short preview of "404 (New Era)" was released on TikTok the following day. More concept photos and the music video teaser for "404 (New Era)" were released on January 22 and 23, respectively. The extended play was released alongside the music video for "404 (New Era)" on January 26.

== Track listing ==
Delulu Pack track listing
No.	Title	Lyrics	Music	Arrangement	Length
1.	"Delulu"	Jeong Hae-won; Lil Cherry; Lee Seul-a	Edvard Erfjord; Nick Hahn; Maria Hazell; Shy Martin; MLite	Erfjord	2:24
2.	"404 (New Era)"	Omega Sapien	Hayden Chapman; Greg Bonnick; Ellen Berg; Moa "Cazzi Opeia" Carlebecker	LDN Noise	2:59
3.	"Underdogs"	Lee Seul-a	Jeppe London Bilsby; Samuel Ledet; Kristin Carpenter; Eline Noelia Myreng; MLite	Bilsby; Ledet	3:02
4.	"Mungnyang" (멍냥)	Jinooya	Daniel Roughley; John Emil; Chelsea Warner; Hilda Stenmalm; Maia Wright; Gucci Caliente; MLite	Roughley; Emil	2:56
5.	"Dizzy"	Ice Cream Man (IDO)	Jacob Manson; Violet Skies; Bill Maybury; MLite	Manson	2:32
6.	"To Me from Me"	Tablo; Haru Lee	Tablo; Philtre	Tablo; Philtre	3:18
Total length:					17:11

== Charts ==
=== Weekly charts ===
Chart performance for Delulu Pack
Chart (2026)	Peak position
Japanese Digital Albums (Oricon)	28
Japanese Hot Albums (Billboard Japan)	28
Japanese Western Albums (Oricon)	12
South Korean Albums (Circle)	4

=== Monthly charts ===
Chart performance for Delulu Pack
Chart (2026)	Position
South Korean Albums (Circle)	12

== Release history ==
Release history for Delulu Pack
Region	Date	Format	Label
South Korea	January 26, 2026	CD	Starship; Kakao
Various	January 26, 2026	Digital download; streaming	Starship; Kakao
