= Lee Chan-hyuk =

South Korean singer (born 1996)

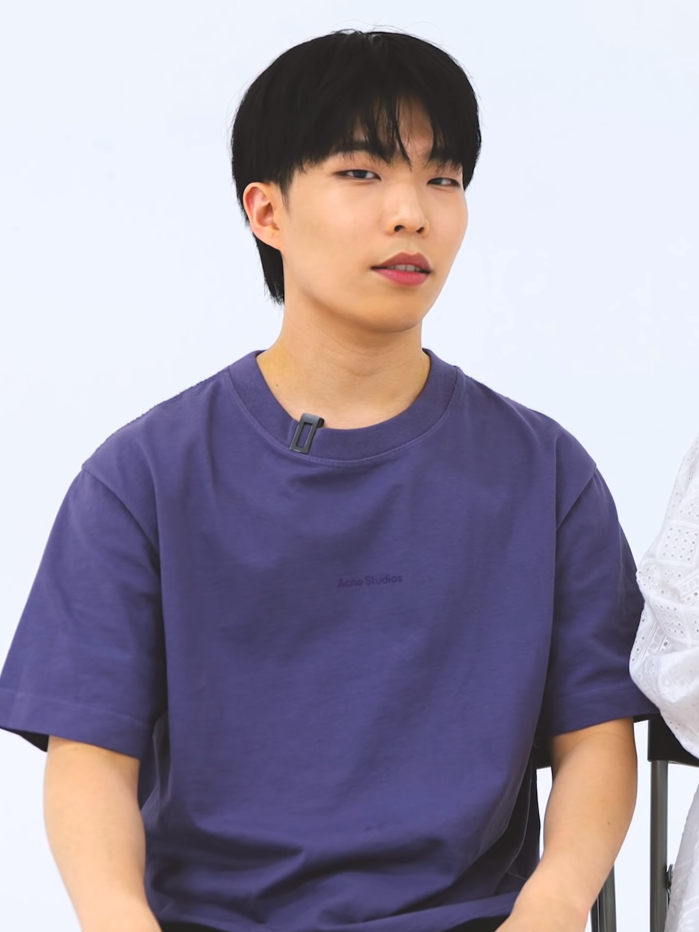
- Lee in an interview with Marie Claire Korea in 2021
- Born: September 12, 1996 (age 30); Uijeongbu, South Korea
- Occupations: Singer-songwriter; producer; author
- Relatives: Lee Su-hyun (sister)
- Musical career
- Genres: K-pop; folk-pop
- Instruments: Vocals; guitar
- Years active: 2014–present
- Label: Cemter of Inspiration
- Member of: AKMU
- Formerly of: YG Family

Korean name
- Hangul: 이찬혁
- RR: I Chanhyeok
- MR: I Ch'anhyŏk

Lee Chan-hyuk (Korean: 이찬혁; born September 12, 1996), is a South Korean singer-songwriter, producer and author. He debuted as a member of the sibling duo AKMU in April 2014, under YG Entertainment.

== Life and career ==
=== 1996–2013: Early life ===
Lee Chan-hyuk was born on September 12, 1996, in Gyeonggi Province, South Korea. Both Chan-hyuk and his younger sister, Lee Su-hyun, moved to Mongolia with their missionary parents for five years, while being home-schooled by their mother, before returning to South Korea. In August 2012, the siblings auditioned for the second installment of SBS reality survival program K-pop Star as Akdong Musician. The sibling duo finished in first place, later choosing to sign under YG Entertainment as they were the only label from the three to provide them the creative freedom they wished for throughout the show, believing their artistry would not be restricted or altered.

=== 2014–2022: AKMU and military enlistment ===
On April 7, 2014, Lee and Lee Su-hyun officially debuted as AKMU (Akdong Musician) with their studio album Play, instantly becoming a commercial success. The sibling duo has since released two more studio albums, two extended plays, one single album and ten singles in their discography. In September 2017, Lee enlisted in the Korean Marine Corps for his mandatory military service, thus temporarily halting all AKMU activities until his return. In midst of his service, it was revealed the Korean Marines officially chose Lee's self-written song, "Marine Triumph" (해병승전가), to represent the Corps. Lee completed his mandatory military service on May 29, 2019, and was discharged. His first appearance since hiatus was as AKMU on JTBC variety program Knowing Bros, where the episode was filmed the day after his release.

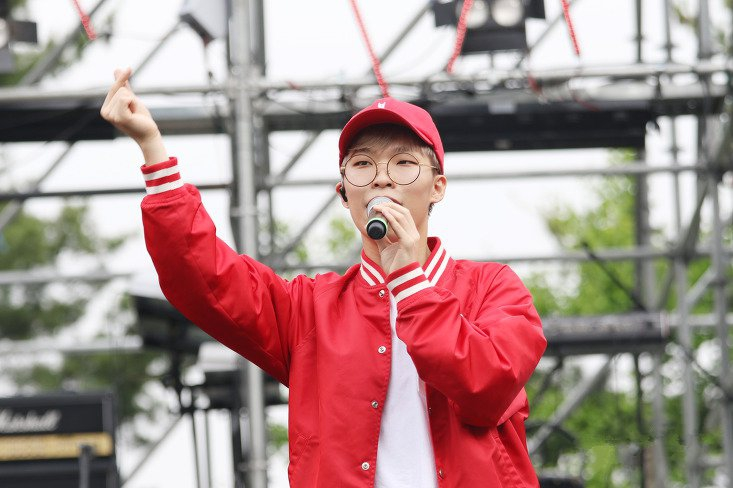
Lee at Ipselenti Korea University Festival in 2016

On September 26, 2019, Lee published his first novel Fish Meets Water (물 만난 물고기), a day after AKMU's album Sailing was released. The novel portrays his perspective on life values and art, and it correlates with the album. The novel became the number one best selling novel in South Korean bookstores. Three years later, Lee published the picture book Alien in collaboration with illustrator Lee Yoon-woo, based on the lyrics he wrote for Su-hyun's first single, "Alien".

=== 2022–2023: Error and Umbrella ===
Lee released his debut studio album, Error, on October 17, 2022, which went on to receive the Best Pop Album award at the 20th Korean Music Awards.

On June 28, 2023, Lee released his first video album Umbrella under the pseudonym Leechanhyukvideo.

=== 2025: Eros and Departure from YG Entertainment ===
On July 14, 2025, Lee released his second studio album Eros, marking his first full-length solo release since Error in 2022. The album features the title track "Vivid LaLa Love", among other songs exploring themes of love, loss, and existential reflection.

In November 2025, AKMU decided to part ways with YG Entertainment after 12 years, reportedly in talks to establish an independent label.

== Discography ==
=== Studio albums ===
List of studio albums, with selected details, chart positions, and sales
Title	Details	Peaks	Sales
Title	Details	KOR	Sales
Error	Released: October 17, 2022; Label: YG; Formats: CD, digital download, streaming	56	KOR: 3,445
Umbrella (우산) (as Leechanhyukvideo)	Released: June 28, 2023; Label: Mystery Friends; Formats: Digital download, streaming	—	—
Eros	Released: July 14, 2025; Label: YG; Formats: CD, digital download, streaming	60	KOR: 1,697

=== Singles ===
Title	Year	Peak positions	Sales	Album
Title	Year	KOR	Sales	Album
As a lead artist
"Panorama" (파노라마)	2022	116	—N/a	Error
"Dance" (춤) (Vocal. Shin Se-hwi)	2023	— (Note: "Dance" did not enter the Circle Digital Chart, but peaked and debuted at number 137 on the Circle Download Chart.)	—N/a	Umbrella
"1 Trillion" (1조)	2024	129	—N/a	Non-album single
"Vivid LaLa Love" (비비드라라러브)	2025	101	—N/a	Eros
"Endangered Love" (멸종위기사랑)	2025	7	—N/a	Eros
As a featured artist
"Think About You" (널 생각해) (Younha featuring Lee Chan-hyuk)	2015	13	KOR: 160,762	Non-album single
"Heartbreak Club" (이별클럽) (Colde featuring Lee Chan-hyuk)	2023	—	—N/a	Love Part 2
"Your Love" (너의사랑) (Chanju featuring Lee Chan-hyuk)	2023	—	—N/a	Wonderland
"Music" (Big Naughty featuring Lee Chan-hyuk)	2025	135	—N/a	Non-album single
Collaborations
"Eat Sleep Live Repeat" (잘 먹고 잘 살아) (with Lee Sung-kyung)	2023	— (Note: "Eat Sleep Live Repeat" did not enter the Circle Digital Chart, but peaked and debuted at number 61 on the Circle Download Chart.)	—N/a	Non-album single
Soundtrack appearances
"Free Smile" (with Lee Hyori)	2022	— (Note: "Free Smile" did not enter the Gaon Digital Chart, but peaked and debuted at number 27 on the Gaon Download Chart.)	—N/a	Seoul Check-in OST
Promotional singles
"Cheers" (치열) (with Code Kunst, Colde and Sogumm) (Note: "Cheers" was released in collaboration with Elle Korea.)	2021	— (Note: "Cheers" did not enter the Circle Digital Chart, but peaked and debuted at number 158 on the Circle Download Chart.)	—N/a	Reconnect

=== Other charted songs ===
Title	Year	Peak positions	Album
Title	Year	KOR DL	Album
"Goodbye, Stay Well" (마지막 인사) (feat. Chungha)	2022	61	Error
"If I Can't Go See You Right Now" (당장 널 만나러 가지 않으면)	2022	68	Error
"Time! Stop!"	2022	84	Error
"A Day"	2022	100	Error
"Funeral Hope" (장례희망)	2022	74	Error
"Castle in My Dream" (내 꿈의 성)	2022	105	Error
"Eyewitness Account" (목격담)	2022	106	Error
"Missed Call" (부재중 전화)	2022	107	Error
"Siren"	2022	112	Error
"What The" (뭐가)	2022	113	Error
"Simple Words" (쉬운 얘기) (Vocal. Lee Su-hyun and Chang Kiha)	2023	111	Umbrella
"Sinny Sinny"	2025	172	Eros
"Out of My Mind" (돌아버렸어)	2025	78	Eros
"TV Show"	2025	175	Eros
"Eve"	2025	169	Eros
"Andrew"	2025	185	Eros
"Tail" (꼬리)	2025	190	Eros
"Shining Ground" (빛나는 세상)	2025	189	Eros

== Filmography ==
=== Film ===
Year	Title	Role	Ref.
2025	Song of the Sun	Music director	

=== Television show ===
Year	Title	Role	Notes	Ref.
2012–2013	K-pop Star Season 2	Contestant	Winner with Akdong Musician	
2017	King of Mask Singer	Contestant	Episode 99	

== Bibliography ==
- Fish Meets Water (2019)
- Alien (2022)

== Awards and nominations ==
Name of the award ceremony, year presented, award category, nominee(s) of the award, and the result of the nomination
Award ceremony	Year	Category	Nominee(s)/work(s)	Result	Ref.
Korea Outstanding Individual Award	2014	—N/a	Lee Chan-hyuk	Won	
Korean Music Awards	2023	Best Pop Album	Error	Won	
Korean Music Awards	2026	Musician of the Year	Lee Chan-hyuk	Nominated	
Korean Music Awards	2026	Album of the Year	Eros	Nominated	
Korean Music Awards	2026	Best Pop Album	Eros	Won	
Korean Music Awards	2026	Song of the Year	Endangered Love	Won	
Korean Music Awards	2026	Best Pop Song	Endangered Love	Won	
MAMA Awards	2025	Best Music Video	Vivid LaLa Love	Nominated	
MAMA Awards	2025	Song of the Year	Vivid LaLa Love	Longlisted	
MAMA Awards	2025	Song of the Year	MUSIC (featuring Big Naughty)	Longlisted	
MAMA Awards	2025	Best Rap & Hip Hop Performance	MUSIC (featuring Big Naughty)	Won	
