= Uncut Gem =

- Digital cover

EP by KiiiKiii
- Released: March 24, 2025
- Length: 16:34
- Language: Korean
- Labels: Starship; Kakao

KiiiKiii chronology
Uncut Gem (2025)	Delulu Pack (2026)

Singles from Uncut Gem
- 1. "I Do Me" Released: February 24, 2025

Uncut Gem is the debut extended play of the South Korean girl group KiiiKiii. It was released by Starship Entertainment and distributed by Kakao Entertainment on March 24, 2025. It contains six tracks, including the lead single "I Do Me".

== Background and release ==
On February 10, Starship Entertainment announced that it would be debuting a new girl group, KiiiKiii. Six days later, it was announced that the group's debut extended play Uncut Gem would be released on March 24. That same day, the music video for "I Do Me", the lead single of the EP, was pre-released. On February 23, KiiiKiii pre-released the music video for the B-side track "Debut Song".

== Composition ==
Uncut Gem is a seamless blend of hip-hop and pop, with punchy beats, dreamy synths, and addictive bass lines.

As for the tracks, "Debut Song" is a trap and electropop track with an old-school K-pop, which interpolates "Happy Birthday to You", "Groundwork" is a rap track with an alarm-like beat, glitchy synths, and heavy bass, "I Do Me" is a pop track with an upbeat, feel-good energy, "There They Go" is a bass-driven R&B track that uses marching snare and sound of heavy breathing to build an intriguing soundscape, "BTG" is an immersive, hypnotic track that layers chic rap, synth arpeggios, and groovy 808 bass, and "One Off" is a 2010s pop track.

== Critical reception ==
Professional ratings
Review scores
Source	Rating
IZM	3/5 stars
NME	3/5 stars

According to Jeong Gi-yeob of IZM, the EP is a blend of "repetition and innovation", focusing on low to mid-range vocals with 1980s foreign synth-pop rhythms as its distinct strength. Jeong also emphasized its "unique style" through the integration of the other songs and visualizations on the album, although there were unnecessary aspects that should have been left behind.

NME's Puah Ziwei said that, as what the EP's title implies, it is still "fresh" and can be "rough around the edges", playing it a little too safe. As for its silver lining, Ziwei applauded KiiiKiii's "uniqueness" in the current landscape and for bringing back a sense of "fun and excitement" to the world of K-pop.

== Commercial performance ==
The EP topped the weekly Circle Album Chart, dated March 23–29, with 206,221 sales.

== Track listing ==
Uncut Gem track listing
No.	Title	Lyrics	Music	Arrangement	Length
1.	"Debut Song"	Lil Cherry	Ryan S. Jhun; Yung Bae; Vaughn Oliver; Lil Cherry; Goldbuuda	Jhun; Goldbuuda; Yung Bae; Oliver	2:02
2.	"Groundwork"	Lee Seul-ah; Lee Hwon	Jhun; Charlie McClean; Martina Sorbara; Emily Rose Persich	Jhun; McClean	2:32
3.	"I Do Me"	Jinooya	Jhun; Von Tiger; Carl Silvergran; Felix Flygare Floderer	Jhun; Silvergran; Floderer	3:10
4.	"There They Go"	Jang Seok-hoon	Jhun; Dem Jointz; Bekuh Boom	Jhun; Dem Jointz	2:35
5.	"BTG"	Lil Cherry; Y0UNG (MUMW); Charis (MUMW)	Jhun; Dem Jointz; Alexis Andrea Boyd; Jack Brady; Jordan Roman; Stan Greene	Jhun; Dem Jointz; The Wavys	3:10
6.	"One Off"	Lee Seul-ah	August Rigo; Ginette Claudette	Rigo	3:05
Total length:					16:34

== Charts ==
=== Weekly charts ===
Chart performance for Uncut Gem
Chart (2025)	Peak position
Japanese Albums (Oricon)	33
South Korean Albums (Circle)	1

=== Monthly chart ===
Chart performance for Uncut Gem
Chart (2025)	Peak position
South Korean Albums (Circle)	9

=== Year-end chart ===
Chart performance for Uncut Gem
Chart (2025)	Position
South Korean Albums (Circle)	92

== Release history ==
Release history and formats for Uncut Gem
Region	Date	Format	Label
South Korea	March 24, 2025	CD	Starship; Kakao
Various	March 24, 2025	Digital download; streaming	Starship; Kakao
