= WhyKiiiKiii =

- Digital cover

EP by KiiiKiii
- Released: August 10, 2026
- Length: 15:35
- Languages: Korean; English
- Labels: Starship; Kakao

KiiiKiii chronology
Delulu Pack (2026)	WhyKiiiKiii (2026)

Singles from WhyKiiiKiii
- 1. "Pop Off Pop Off" Released: August 10, 2026

Professional ratings
Review scores
Source	Rating
IZM	4/5 stars

WhyKiiiKiii is the third extended play by South Korean girl group KiiiKiii. It was released by Starship Entertainment on August 10, 2026, and contains six tracks, including the lead single "Pop Off Pop Off".

== Background and release ==
On July 19, 2026, upon the release of teaser photos and an update to the group's website, Starship Entertainment announced that KiiiKiii would be releasing their third extended play WhyKiiiKiii on August 10. The promotion schedule was released as a series of teaser images on July 22. On July 23, a series of six videos titled "A Day in WhyKiiiKiii" with previews of the album's tracks were released every four hours, followed by "Girls Duty Free" teaser photos released on the following day. "Ever2Late!", "Hey Hi", and "Sweet Sour" concept photos were released on July 26, 27, and 29 respectively. On July 30, a stop-motion video for the track "Candy Pink Magic Hole Flip Phone" was released. "Blue Hour" concept photos were released the next day. On August 3, a short preview of the lead single "Pop Off Pop Off" was revealed on TikTok, and a highlight medley video was released later the same day. Concept photos for "Pop Off Pop Off" were released from August 5 to 6, followed by its music video teaser on August 7. The extended play was released alongside the music video for "Pop Off Pop Off" on August 10.

== Promotion ==
Prior to the release of WhyKiiiKiii, a pop up store was hosted from August 6 to 9 at PUBG Seongsu in Seoul to commemorate the album's release.

== Track listing ==
WhyKiiiKiii track listing
No.	Title	Lyrics	Music	Arrangement	Length
1.	"Ever2Late!"	Sumin; Tomatomat; The Deep; Zin Choi	Bhavik Pattani; Amanda Konshuaga; Hiten Bharadia; MLite	808Bhav808	2:32
2.	"Hey Hi"	The Deep; Lil Cherry	Jason Hahs; Mads Mason; Ashley Fulton; Gabriella Grombacher; MLite	Jahs; Mads Mason	2:50
3.	"Pop Off Pop Off"	Sumin; Omega Sapien; Iiso; Yoon Da-hye; Seo Kyung-moon	Benjamin Harris Berger; Ryan Rabin; David Charles Fischer; Noémie Legrand; MLite	Captain Cuts	2:21
4.	"Sweet Sour"	Lee Seul-ah	Ido Nadjar; Em Walcott; Celine Svanbäck; MLite	Ido Nadjar	2:57
5.	"Candy Pink Magic Hole Flip Phone" (나 어떡해)	Effie	Gucci Caliente; Emma Rosen; Moa Petterson Hammar; MLite	Gucci Caliente	2:46
6.	"Blue Hour"	Camo; Iiso	Yannick Rastogi; Zacharie Raymond; Raphaella Mazaheri-Asadi; MLite	Banx & Ranx	2:09
Total length:					15:35

== Charts ==
=== Weekly charts ===
Chart performance for WhyKiiiKiii
Chart (2026)	Peak position
Japanese Albums (Oricon)	13
Japanese Combined Albums (Oricon)	15
Japanese Hot Albums (Billboard Japan)	39
South Korean Albums (Circle)	4

=== Monthly charts ===
Chart performance for WhyKiiiKiii
Chart (2026)	Peak position
Japanese Albums (Oricon)	34
South Korean Albums (Circle)	16

== Release history ==
Release history for WhyKiiiKiii
Region	Date	Format	Label
South Korea	August 10, 2026	CD	Starship; Kakao
Various	August 10, 2026	Digital download; streaming	Starship; Kakao
