= Visla Magazine =

South Korean online magazine

- Website type: Online magazine
- Available in: Korean
- Website: visla.kr
- Launched: 2012
- Current status: Active

Visla Magazine (Korean: 비슬라 매거진) is a South Korean online magazine that publishes articles, columns, and interviews of various subcultures such as music, arts, and fashion.

== History ==
Visla Magazine was founded in December 2012. The magazine was conducted in the form of 2 publishers, and 2 editors in the beginning. In 2023, Visla Magazine cooperated in Itaewon's business district recovery project held by the Ministry of SMEs and Startups, and held an exhibition on the theme of Itaewon.
