= Hanroro =

South Korean singer-songwriter

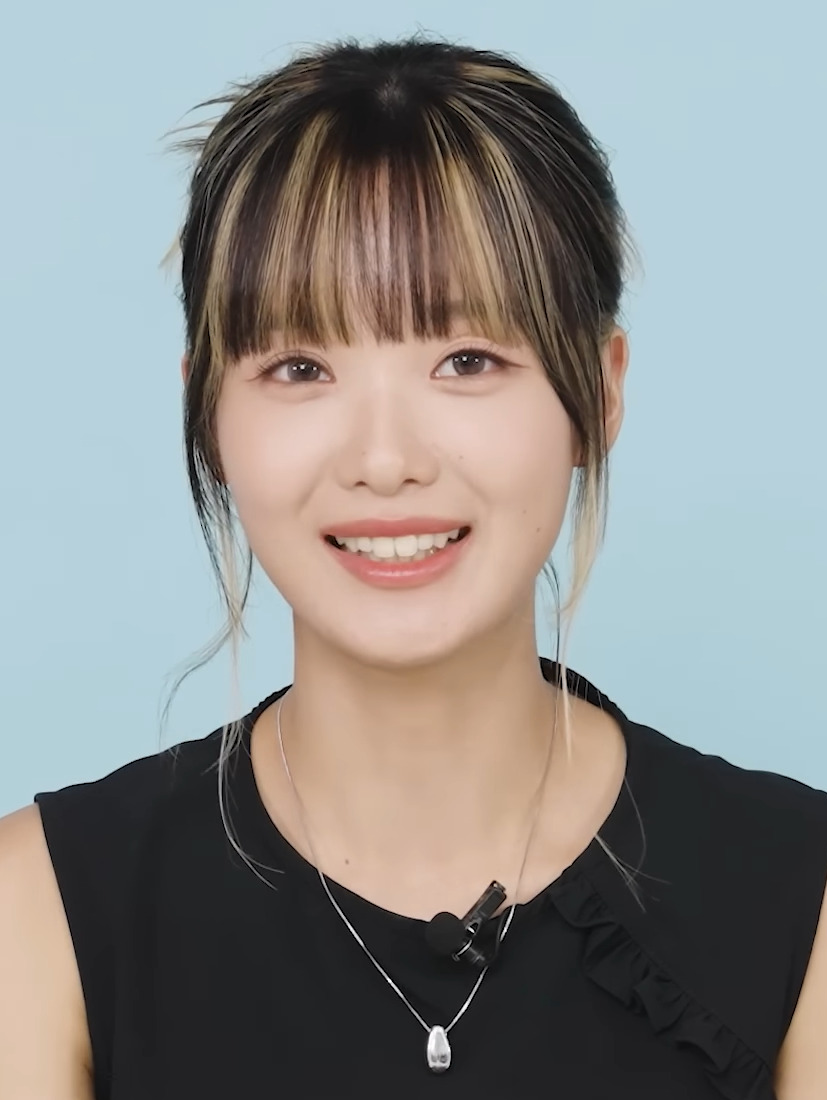
- Hanroro in 2025

Background information
- Born: Han Ji-su; November 11, 2000 (age 25); Changwon, Gyeongsangnam-do, South Korea
- Origin: South Korea
- Genres: Pop rock; indie rock; alternative rock; indie pop; noise pop
- Occupations: Singer; songwriter; musician
- Instruments: Vocals; ukulele
- Years active: 2022–present
- Label: Authentic

Korean name
- Hangul: 한지수
- RR: Han Jisu
- MR: Han Chisu

Han Ji-su (Korean: 한지수; born November 11, 2000), better known by her stage name Hanroro (한로로), is a South Korean singer-songwriter and musician.

Her stage name, “Hanroro,” started when her friends called her “Han-log” while studying exponents and logarithms in math class. That became her nickname however she viewed it as too mathematical and a bit much to use as a stage name, so she added “Loro.” “Ro” brings to mind the Chinese character for “road” (路), giving her stage name an attitude of “Let’s find our own path” and “Let’s set out to find our path.”

== Career ==
In the winter of 2020, Hanro, who had been vaguely wanting to make music, happened to watch a music video by an artist named “Choseung” under Studio MOS and became captivated by the mood of the video. She remarked, "With the desire to learn music together, I contacted Studio MOS, and later had a meeting with the company and signed a contract."

Following her debut single "Let Me Love My Youth" (입춘) in March 2022, Hanroro gained recognition in the South Korean indie rock scene for her introspective lyrics addressing youth anxieties. In 2023, she released her first EP, Take-off, which charted at number 4 on the Circle Album Chart.Her popularity expanded rapidly with the release of her subsequent EPs, Home (2024) and Jamong Salgu Club (2025), leading to her winning her first major music award at the Melon Music Awards 2025.

== Discography ==
=== Extended plays ===
Title	EP details	Peak chart positions	Sales
Title	EP details	KOR	Sales
Take-off (이상비행)	Released: August 29, 2023; Label: authentic; Formats: LP, CD, download	4	KOR: 17,643
Home (집)	Released: May 28, 2024; Label: authentic; Formats: CD, download	5	KOR: 2,587
Jamong Salgu Club (자몽살구클럽)	Released: August 4, 2025; Label: authentic; Formats: CD, download	17	KOR: 8,037

=== Singles ===
Title	Year	Peak chart positions	Album
Title	Year	KOR	Album
"Let Me Love My Youth" (입춘)	2022	18	Non-album singles
"Mirror" (거울)	2022	—	Non-album singles
"Like My Groove" (with The Orchard)	2022	—	Non-album singles
"Don’t Be Afraid to Fall" (비틀비틀 짝짜꿍)	2022	—	Non-album singles
"Questions From Our Night" (당신의 밤은 나의 밤과 같습니까)	2022	—	Non-album singles
"The Last Stop of Our Pain" (정류장)	2023	—	Non-album singles
"Even If You Leave" (자처)	2023	—	Take-off
"I'm Happy" (화해)	2023	—	Take-off
"Goldfish" (금붕어)	2023	—	Take-off
"Mayfly" (하루살이)	2023	—	Non-album single
"System Error" (먹이사슬)	2024	—	Home
"How To Go On" (생존법)	2024	—	Home
"Ashes" (재)	2024	—	Home
"H O M E" (ㅈㅣㅂ)	2024	—	Home
"So Nice" (GMF Theme Song)	2024	—	Non-album singles
"The Compass" (나침반)	2024	—	Non-album singles
"Can I Be Me?" (도망)	2025	— (Note: "Can I Be Me?" did not enter the Circle Digital Chart, but it peaked at number 179 on the component Download Chart.)	Jamong Salgu Club
"Goodbye, My Summer" (시간을 달리네)	2025	172	Jamong Salgu Club
"Game Over?" (게임 오버 ?)	2026	105	Non-album singles
"You and I" (너와 나)	2026	138	Non-album singles
"Zankoku na Tenshi no Tēze" (잔혹한 천사의 테제)	2026	127	Non-album singles
"—" denotes a recording that did not chart.

=== Other charted songs ===
Title	Year	Peak chart positions	Album
Title	Year	KOR	Album
"Landing in Love" (사랑하게 될 거야)	2023	2	Take-off
"0+0"	2025	4	Jamong Salgu Club
"1111"	2026	151	Non-album song

=== Soundtrack appearances ===
Title	Year	Album
"Do What You Like"	2022	Dear X Who Doesn't Love Me OST
"Run!" (뛰어!)	2025	Maru Is a Puppy OST

== Awards and nominations ==
Award ceremony	Year	Category	Nominee/work	Result	Ref.
Korean Music Awards	2023	Rookie of the Year	Hanroro	Nominated	
Korean Music Awards	2023	Best Modern Rock Song	"Let Me Love My Youth"	Nominated	
Korean Music Awards	2025	Best Modern Rock Song	"H O M E"	Nominated	
Melon Music Awards	2024	Track Zero Choice (Popularity Award)	"H O M E"	Nominated	
Melon Music Awards	2025	Track Zero Choice (Popularity Award)	"Goodbye, My Summer"	Won	

== Musical style and themes ==
Hanroro's music primarily incorporates elements of indie rock, pop rock, and alternative rock. Her songwriting is widely noted for its deeply personal lyrics that explore the emotional struggles, loneliness, and anxieties experienced by young adults. Korean media outlets have frequently described her work as providing comfort to "anxious youth," with her lyrics often taking inspiration from personal diary entries.
