= List of The Return of Superman episodes =

The following is a list of episodes of South Korean reality-variety show The Return of Superman, which used to be part of a segment of Happy Sunday. The pilot first aired on 19 September 2013. As of 23 June 2024, 531 episodes of The Return of Superman have been aired.

== Pilot ==
The original three episode pilot aired as a Chuseok holiday special.

No.	Title	Original release date	Rating
1	"A Man Became A Dad To 500 Children With Only 4 Women!"	19 September 2013	8.1%
The four celebrity dads and their children are introduced. Lee Hyunwoo takes his sons to the market. Lee Hwijae struggles to take care of his 8-month-old twin boys alone for the first time. Choo Sunghoon takes his 1-year-old daughter out for a hair cut. Jang Hyunsung learns to cook and do housework for the first time in his life.
2	"The Dads Are In Crisis"	20 September 2013	8.6%
Lee Hwijae takes his twin boys out to a friends' party. On their way back home, Seojun does not stop crying which scares Hwijae, and he takes him to the emergency room to have him checked out. Jang Hyunsung has a nice long chat with his sons about his wife (their mother) and he takes Junu out for a hike. After breakfast, Lee Hyunwoo weighs his sons to see how much they weigh. Choo Sunghoon takes Sarang to the doctor's to get her immunization shots. He also takes her to a gym where he tries to get a workout.
3	"In The Name of Father..."	21 September 2013	8.5%
Lee Hwijae's father pays a visit to his home to play with the twins. Later Hwijae takes his twins out to the park for a walk. Choo Sunghoon tries to teach Sarang the meaning and pronunciation of words in Korean. Jang Hyunsung and his sons arrange a photo album together. Lee Hyunwoo reads to his sons when they accidentally spill water all over the living room floor. The four dads gather together at the end of the show to reflect their time spent alone with their kids.

== 2013 ==
No.	Title	Original release date	Rating
1	"Things You Only Realize Once You Raise Them"	3 November 2013	7.2%
Choo Sunghoon and Sarang are going to Osaka to meet Sunghoon's parents. Tablo is recovering from shoulder surgery as he takes care of his daughter, Haru. Lee Hwi-jae goes to see an eye doctor to check Seoeon and Seojun's eyes. The charismatic actor Jang Hyunsung is actually a very clumsy person at home. He's very friendly with his two sons, Junu and Junseo. He teaches Junseo how to ride a bicycle without training wheels. Guest stars: Jung Eun-pyo, Mithra Jin, and DJ Tukutz from Epik High; Jeong Hyeong-don
2	"They're Just Like Me"	10 November 2013	7.9%
Sunghoon and Sarang have so much fun in Osaka. Sarang spends her birthday at her grandparents' house and experiences various new activities. Meanwhile, Tablo and Haru go to the aquarium to see fish, which are Haru's favorite thing in the world. Hwijae, worried about the twins' eyes, takes them to an eye doctor. They get their eyes checked up and Hwijae is scared by the sound of their crying. They go to a baseball park together. Hyunsung goes to Junu's parent-teacher conference and gets surprised by Junu's letter and his performance in school. Guest stars: Park Seo-joon, Yoon Bora, Lee Dong-wook
3	"I Can't Live Without You"	10 November 2013	8.4%
Sunghoon and his dad want to teach Sarang judo. Sarang is now getting along well with her grandparents. Sarang's mom, Shiho Yano, arrives in Osaka. Haru wants to treat her dad's arm. Tablo starves for two days and realizes how hard it was for his wife Hyejung to look after Haru. It's Haru's first time spending two days without her mom. Hwijae's wife told Hwijae to go to the culture center. Will he be able to take care of the twins? Hyunsung tries to cook curry, but he doesn't even know how to peel carrots. Hyunsung and his boys prepare a surprise for their mom for their wedding anniversary.
4	"This is What Your Dad is Like"	24 November 2013	6.8%
Sarang's suffering from constipation. To show off his cool side, Sunghoon takes Sarang to his photo shoot. He takes her to the gym afterwards. Sarang usually cries, but she stays quiet, which surprises Sunghoon. Tablo and his family have breakfast, and after Hyejeong leaves, Haru dances to K-Pop. Tablo plays many of his songs for Haru to get her opinion. Hwijae's twins are growing really fast. They can now stand up. After the boys' advancement test in taekwondo, Hyunsung goes to the market to cook something tasty for the boys, and attracts the attention of others at the market.
5	"It's Okay to Fail at First"	1 December 2013	7.4%
Haru learns to spend more time with Tablo's bandmate and friend Tukutz's baby. Junu and Junseo go shopping for clothes with Hyunsung. Hwijae takes the twins to a wedding and they continually suffer from stomach problems. Sunghoon takes Sarang to Hakone hot springs, but Sarang refuses to go into the hot spring and won't let him either. Guest stars: DJ Tukutz with his son Kim Yunu, Lee Young-Hyun, Jeong Hyeong-don via phone call, Jeong Jun-ha via phone call
6	"Kids Raise Dads"	8 December 2013	7.5%
Haru goes to a fishing park with Tablo. They catch fish for the first time. Sarang continues to have constipation problems. Sunghoon and Sarang are still at Hakone. They have a craft day where they make souvenirs for their mom, Shiho. The twins have diarrhea problems and special nannies Choi Hongman and Lee Hyundo come to help. Hwijae takes Seoeon and Seojun to a baby play facility where Seoeon encounters his first love. Junu and Junseo learn about pocket money and finances. Guest stars: Lee Hyun-do, Choi Hong-man
7	"Sons & Daughters"	15 December 2013	8.8%
Sarang's mother, Shiho Yano, gives a ton of chores to Sunghoon. He has to take Sarang to get her hair cut, make juice for her constipation and so on. To avoid Sarang getting mad at him, he takes her to the Disney store and lets her pick out whatever she wants. Haru visits the zoo with Tablo. Her friends are scared of the animals, but she is not. Hwijae tries to feed his twins baby food, but the twins start fighting. Later, he takes the twins to the TV studio. Junu and Junseo start the day by fighting and Hyunsung takes them out to fly a kite. Hyunsung also brings his sons to his mother's house to make kimchi. The four dads gather together to tape an episode of KBS Happy Together. Guest stars: Yoo Jae-suk, Park Myung-su
8	"Merry Christmas"	22 December 2013	9.1%
The four dads continue with their taping of Happy Together. Shiho gives Sunghoon a list of things he needs to do, including buying a Christmas tree. It's his first time decorating a tree. Kwanghee of ZE:A visits the Choovely family. Tablo wants to make this Christmas special, so he disguises himself as Santa Claus but Haru's reaction isn't something Tablo expected. The twins get to celebrate their first Christmas. Hwijae takes them to a toy store, but they keep giving him a hard time. Hyunsung makes egg bread for the first time for Junu and Junseo. Guest stars: Yoo Jae-suk, Park Myung-su, Shin Bong-sun, Park Mi-sun, Hwang Kwanghee, Jung Eun-pyo and his family
9	"No Flower Blossoms Without Hardship"	29 December 2013	8.2%
Sunghoon and Sarang visit Mt. Fuji, but Sarang isn't interested at all. Later Sunghoon prepares a surprise party for Shiho. Tablo and Haru visit Haru's grandpa's grave. She writes a card to him. When Hyejung comes home, Haru surprises her dad with the song she wrote. The twins are growing really fast. They try walking with a walker. Hwijae takes them to a swimming pool for babies to swim. Hyunsung tries making bean sprout rice, but Junseo seems to know how he should make it. Junu expresses how he thinks his mom favors Junseo, since he's younger. Guest stars: Jeong Jun-ha via phone call

== 2014 ==
No.	Title	Original release date	Rating
10	"Tell Me Your Wish"	5 January 2014	8.5%
Sunghoon and Sarang decide to go to Okinawa to get away from snowy Tokyo. Tablo wants to help Haru find what she wants to do in the future, so they visit a martial arts school. Hwijae wants his twins to be professional athletes so he starts teaching them sports, he takes them to a basketball court and calls a professional baseball player to his house. On a snowing day, Hyunsung takes his two son's to their grandpa's grave. Hyunsung cries in grief as he misses his father so much. Junseo waits for the tooth fairy and makes a wish. Guest stars: Hwang Jae-kyun (Lotte Giants infielder)
11	"My Child's Private Life"	12 January 2014	8.2%
The Choovely family begin their trip in Okinawa as they go to see dolphins, horses and the 2nd largest aquarium in the world. Haru continues her search for a career path with ballet. Junu and Junseo get a treat to a theme park from their dad and they learn to overcome some fears. The twins get their first ever haircut and professional photo shoot. They arrive all dressed up at Grandma's house to celebrate her birthday. Guest stars: Cha Tae-hyun via phone call, Hwang Jung-min via phone call
12	"If We Hadn't Met Then"	19 January 2014	8.7%
The Choovely family spend their last day in Okinawa. Junseo and Junu get caught up in their father's enthusiasm for cooking. Hyunsung attempts his very first pasta dish. Hwijae ends up having a great but also terrible time at his parents' house when he and the twins pay a visit to celebrate his mother's birthday. He's worried to death about what his wife will think about what his mother has done. Seojun gets compliments from his grandparents for his happy and open personality, while Seoeon is criticized for being a brat and crybaby. Haru continues her search for an early look at a career path which leads her to cooking class. Guest stars: Director Jang Hang-jun with his daughter Jang Yun-seo
13	"What Did You Come to Our House (Seollal Special)"	26 January 2014	9.8%
Sarang visits Junu and Junseo, and Haru visits Seojun and Seoeon. Hwijae and his wife Jeongwon tries to play a candid camera trick on Tablo, but their prank backfires and Jeongwon ends up suffering. The Jang brothers vie for Sarang's attention because of her cuteness. Sarang seems to prefer the older and more mature Junu as a playmate. Haru is excited about spending a night at the twins' home and can't wait to play with them, but she ends up making Hwijae and her dad suffer through the entire night. It's the Seollal special where all the families gather for the first time.
14	"Family is Like a Puzzle (Seollal Special)"	2 February 2014	9.9%
The Superman families have gathered for the first time. The dads cook a new year meal together and give out money to the children. Junu captured Sarang's attention in the last episode, this time Haru shows her undeniable crush on him, but Junu only has eyes for laid back baby Seojun once he arrives at uncle Hwijae's home. All the kids and dads have a photo shoot together and the moms arrives to give their thoughts about the show.
15	"Dad's Miracle Effect"	9 February 2014	9.4%
Hyunsung and the boys visit Haru's house for a full day of fun, fishing and hanging out. Haru's love for Junu continues to blossom as she's blown away by his gentle kindness and charm. Tablo, Haru and the Jang's goes ice fishing. Meanwhile the Choovely family enjoy their first whole day in Seoul. Sarang's need for an Anpanman toy causes Sunghoon to lose a fortune. They head to a dry sauna and then to Insa-dong for a great day and have a dinner date with an international star. Hwijae and the twins are not shown in this episode. Guest stars: Rain
16	"I'm Not Afraid If We're Together"	16 February 2014	12.1%
The Jang family visits Japan for the first time and get lost on the way to the Choo's home. When they finally get there, Junseo continues to try and win over Sarang but to no avail. Hyunsung also finds out he is quite popular in Japan when he encounters a Japanese fan. Hwijae takes his boys out for the first time in a while and learns how to massage them to keep them calm. Haru attends Big Bang's concert where she gets shy when she sees her idol and later helps out dad, Tablo in the recording studio. Guest stars: Big Bang, Sandara Park from 2NE1, Lee Hi, Mithra Jin & DJ Tukutz from Epik High
17	"Good Daddy Complex"	23 February 2014	10.4%
The Jang brothers continue their journey in Japan as Junseo gets a haircut from Sunghoon's regular stylist, they visit a giant Gundam and have a face-off with a real-life raptor. Meanwhile Haru has fun with her friend Hyeon as they go winter camping. The twins are out with their grandmother, who always gets criticized for her child-rearing antics. Hwijae goes out with Seoeon and is embarrassed when fans mentioned that Seoeon can't be without his father.
18	"Dads Will Fight Through Anything"	2 March 2014	9.3%
The Jang's continue their adventures in Japan with the Choovely family. They visit Legoland and Junseo finally seems to get close with Sarang. Haru spends a fun day on dates with daddy and even shoots and stars in her own children's book. The twins get their development tested. The results surprise Hwijae and he learns to change certain actions towards his sons.
19	"You Are My Spring"	9 March 2014	10.9%
Haru spends the spring day picking strawberries and making jam for her mom. She becomes close with a puppy at the animal farm next door and wants to take him home. The twins split up for the day and Hwijae fulfills his dream of acting like a Hollywood dad. He comes home to give Seojun a bubble bath with the help from two Super Junior members. Sarang gets to hang out with her pre-school boyfriend Yuto. Sunghoon gets a taste of how it is to take care of a boy and care for two kids at the same time. Jang's have a fun time getting Junseo vaccinated and meeting some big name actors. Guest stars: Kim Heechul & Kangin from Super Junior, Jeong Eun-pyo and his family, cast of Hwayi: A Monster Boy (Kim Yoon-seok, Cho Jin-woong)
20	"Dating Rather Than Babysitting"	16 March 2014	10.0%
Junu finally gets to meet the actor Yeo Jingoo, but he actually becomes really shy and he can't even talk to him. The Jang's leave for Busan to go to the actor Kim Jungtae's place. There, they meet his son Yakkung, who's the most happy child in the world. Sarang's pre-school boyfriend Yuto keeps making Sarang mad and Sunghoon has a hard time trying to reconcile the two. Also, the fighter Kim Donghyun visits Sarang's house. Hwijae goes to the basketball court and there, he feels small due to basketball player Wu Jiwon's babysitting skills. Haru and Tablo takes a tour around Gwangjang market and sample the delicious food there. Guest stars: cast of Hwayi: A Monster Boy (Kim Yoon-seok, Cho Jin-woong, Kim Sung-kyun, Yeo Jin-goo), Woo Ji-won with his daughter Woo Na-yun, Kim Jung-tae with his son Kim Ji-hoo (Yakkung), Dong Hyun Kim
21	"This Is The Moment"	23 March 2014	10.8%
Haru buys a violin and gets her first lesson from a pretty teacher. The Jang brothers continue their adventure in Busan with Yakkung and finds out just how important Busan is to their mom and dad. Sarang has a lesson with a tutor in Korean. Later Sarang has fun with Yuto at daycare but their violent relationship continues to go up and down when Sarang takes Yuto's grapes and refuses to share them. Hwijae and Seoeon have fun with Yun Hyeongbin and cooks a romantic birthday breakfast for his wife. Guest stars: Kim Jung-tae with his son Kim Ji-hoo (Yakkung), Yoon Hyeong-bin
22	"Daddies Need Holidays Too"	30 March 2014	10.2%
The Superman families head to Jeju-do for a much needed holiday. They go to the aquarium and enjoy the local delicious raw fish delicacy. Meanwhile Sarang is visited by members of Girls' Generation who are fans of her. They have a blast becoming friends with Sarang. Afterwards Sarang and her dad Sunghoon heads to Jeju-do to join the rest of the Superman families. They end the day by planning a birthday party for the twins. Guest stars: Girls' Generation (Taeyeon, Sunny, Tiffany, Sooyoung, Yoona)
23	"The Story I Want to Tell You"	6 April 2014	10.2%
All the wives arrives at Jeju-do to rejoin their families. Haru's family enjoy a hike and a great feast eating a new type of chicken soup. The Jang brothers enjoy horse riding and a seafood feast with Hyunsung's friends. Sarang and Sunghoon search for their ancestral home in Jeju-do, then have a mega barbecue feast with Shiho when she arrives in Jeju-do. Hwijae and the twins prepare for their 1st birthday party.
24	"I Love Jeju-do, I Love You"	13 April 2014	9.5%
All the families are gathered in Jeju-do and they have a blast at the twins' 1st birthday party. The next day, each family goes on their own adventure. Haru's family goes horse riding and eats a unique type of seafood instant noodles. The Jang brothers go hang gliding and swimming. Sarang's family go to pick dekopon and go in search of a dol hareubang. The twins enjoy a date at the soccer stadium and later visits their dad's friend Heo Su-gyeong's home, where Seoeon shows his Casanova personality when he chases Su-gyeong's, 7 year old daughter Byeol around her house. Guest stars: Heo Su-gyeong with her daughter Byeol
25	"The First Time Is Always Exciting"	4 May 2014^{1}	9.3%
A new family has joined the show, it's actor Kim Jungtae and his son Yakkung! Look forward to their first 48 hours without mom. Former baseball player Yang Junhyeok visits Hwijae and he does a great job in taking care of the twins. Sarang practices a birthday song to celebrate her grandpa's birthday. Also he visits Sarang's house in Tokyo and gets a health examination done for the first time in his life. UV visits Tablo to create a children's song. The Jang brothers seem to be going through puberty and becoming more rebellious, so Hyunsung takes them for a counseling session. Guest stars: DJ Tukutz from Epik High, Yoo Se-yoon, and Muzie with daughter Soho from UV; Yang Joon-hyuk retired Samsung Lions outfielder; Kim Bo-min with son Seo-woo.
26	"Spring is Here"	11 May 2014	10.1%
Hwijae and the twins pay a visit to former S.E.S member Shoo, who is the mother of twin girls that are the same age as Seoeon and Seojun. The two sets of twins enjoy a fun day together. Epik High and UV continue with their collaboration to produce a children's song and call themselves YF meaning "Young Father". Haru rides the Tayo bus, where Tablo takes her to an antique market. Sarang goes on a date with her grandpa. She follows everything he does. Junu and Junseo do a role play to understand each other's position. Later actress Goo Hye Sun visits the Jang's and brings her dog to help the boys overcome their fears of dogs. Yakkung goes on an outing with Jungtae to the largest street market in Busan where they sample delicious street food. Yakkung also realizes how popular he is with the locals. Later Jungtae brings Yakkung to his old neighborhood to see the house he used to live in. Guest stars: DJ Tukutz from Epik High, Yoo Se-yoon & Muzie with daughter Soho from UV, Shoo with twin daughters Lim Ra-hee & Lim Ra-yool, Goo Hye Sun
27	"And That's How You Become a Father"	18 May 2014	10.7%
Hwijae is left with the two sets of twins at Shoo's house when she goes to pick up her 5 year old son Yu from school. Seoeon continues to flirt with the twin sisters and has a stare down with their older brother Yu. Yakkung goes to get a haircut but he gets so scared that he wails in the hair salon. Later his friend Jimin comes over. The Choovely family have gathered to celebrate Sunghoon's father's birthday. Shiho prepares Korean food for him and Sunghoon's sister Jeonghwa visits. Tablo takes Haru to where his childhood memories lie. There, he reminisces of his good old days. He also takes Haru to the recording studio, where she meets Chinese singer Bibi Zhou. Hyunsung cooks and prepares a birthday meal for his father-in-law's birthday. Guest stars: Shoo with twin daughters Lim Ra-hee & Lim Ra-yool and son Lim Yu, Goo Hye Sun, Mithra Jin & DJ Tukutz from Epik High, Bibi Zhou, Gong Hyo-jin via video chat
28	"Great Expectations"	25 May 2014	9.5%
Haru and her mom go to Osaka, Japan to see Tablo and the rest of the YG family concert. When making Epik High fan posters, Haru gets mad at her mom for using the pink marker and throws a tantrum, Hyejung gets mad and scolds at Haru. Sarang continues with learning the Korean language. Later Sunghoon takes her to the doctors for a check up, but because of past frightening experiences at the doctor Sarang refuses to cooperate. Jungtae takes Yakkung to a hula dance class. Yakkung takes an immediate liking to it and is eager to learn the hula dance. Hwijae and the twins go visit his parents. Seoeon shows his grandmother that he can walk on his own. Seojun gives a surprise reaction when his grandmother feeds him yogurt. Guest stars: Akdong Musician, Sean from Jinusean, Mithra Jin & DJ Tukutz from Epik High, Big Bang (G-Dragon, Taeyang, Daesung), 2NE1, Winner, Team B
29	"You Are My Destiny"	1 June 2014	9.8%
Sarang attends Yuto's birthday party at the park, but gets upset when he plays with the other kids. Haru and Hyejeong enjoy the YG concert in Osaka, Japan. Haru gets to meet G-Dragon again. Jungtae and Yakkung visits a farm with Kim Daehee and his three daughters. Daehee's youngest daughter seems to fancy Yakkung but he likes the middle daughter who is a few years older than him. Junu and Junseo meet Akdong Musician and learn their dance. The twins' older cousin David pays a visit. While playing with the twins, Hwijae gets surprised that Seojun can understand him and walk on his own. Guest stars: Kim Dae-hee with daughters (Kim Sa-yun, Kim Hyeon-oh, Kim Ho-me), Big Bang, Sean from Jinusean, Mithra Jin & DJ Tukutz from Epik High, Akdong Musician, Lee Jae-hoon from Cool 쿨, Kim Sook, Kal So-won
30	"Memories Are Delicious"	8 June 2014	9.0%
Hwijae brings the twins with him to play tennis and tries to set two friends up on a blind date. Later his friend Hyeon-cheol visits his home to learn how to take care of kids. Haru and her family are still in Osaka, Japan. Tablo and Haru go to the Nissin Instant Ramen Museum and make a custom instant cup of noodles. Sunghoon tries to get Sarang interested in gymnastics. She seems to enjoy it when an instructure visits their home but when they go to Daisuke's gymnastics class she doesn't seem interested. Jungtae, Yakkung and Daehee's family are still enjoying their trip at the farm. They enjoy a nice outdoor lunch and horse back riding. The Jang family goes to Seoul's Chinatown to enjoy a delicious Chinese lunch. After their meal they meet up with their wife/mother for a fun day at the amusement park. Guest stars: Kim Dae-hee with daughters (Kim Sa-yun, Kim Hyeon-oh, Kim Ho-me), Lee Jae-hoon from Cool 쿨, Kim Sook, comedian Kim In-seok, Kim Hyeon-cheol
31	"Let's Be Friends"	15 June 2014	8.8%
Sunghoon brings Sarang and her friend Yuto to Tokyo Disneyland, the two are confused upon meeting Oswald the Lucky Rabbit. The twins can finally walk on their own now. Hwijae makes a strawberry cake from scratch for his mother-in-law's birthday. Seojun's look-a-like Kim Jun-hyun shows up at his home to get to know him. Tablo and Hyejung's former dog Heendoongi comes to visit them for a day. Haru wants to get friendly with Heendoongi, but Heendoongi doesn't seem to like her. Yakkung attends a ballet dance class, later he and Jungtae goes to his mom's university to pick her up. Hyunsung and Junseo make preparations for Junu's birthday party. Tablo and Haru go to the Jang's home later to help Junu celebrate his birthday. Jungtae and Yakkung bid their farewell as this was their last episode. Guest stars: comedian Kim Jun-hyun
32	"Dreams Do Come True"	22 June 2014	9.1%
Sunghoon, Sarang and Yuto are still having fun at Tokyo Disneyland. The 3 explore the theme park together and finally get to meet Mickey Mouse. The next day Sunghoon brings Sarang to a farm to see live animals. Seojun and his look-a-like Kim Jun-hyun are getting close. Kim Jun-hyun invites his friend and Gag Concert co-star Yu Min-sang over to have a fun afternoon with the twins. Hwijae later brings the twins with him for an eye examination. Haru and Tablo have a sleepover at the Jang's home, the next day all of them head off to a forest outing together. Guest cast Do Kyung Wan and Jang Yun-jeong chronic their path to becoming first time parents. Guest stars: comedian Kim Jun-hyun and Yu Min-sang, Jang Yun-jeong, Do Kyung Wan, Zo In-sung via phone call
33	"Kids Grow Up Like Me"	29 June 2014	10.0 %
The Jang's are guest at Tablo's radio show and Hwijae makes a surprise live phone in while Tablo and Hyunsung are on air. The twins have another fight and Seojun stands up to Seoeon. Yunjeong and Kyungwan meet up with Hwijae and the twins to get parenting advice. Sarang gets to milk a live cow and makes ice cream with her dad. Later she and her mom have a dress up fashion show for Sunghoon. The Jang's head to a mountain spring and reflect their time on the show. The Jang's bid their goodbyes as they exit the show. New "Superman" Song Il-gook and his triplet sons introduce themselves. Guest stars: Jang Yun-jeong, Do Kyung Wan, Sunny from Girls' Generation, Shoo via phone call
34	"The Birth of a Family"	6 July 2014	12.5%
Song Il-gook and his triplet sons join the show. He takes care of his 3 rambunctious boys and takes them out for a bike ride to the park. Yunjeong looks through baby pictures of Kyungwan and old pictures of her in-laws. Later they head to a baby shop to prepare items for the birth of their child. Hwijae invites Shoo and her twin girls over to his home. He and his wife offer to look after the girls so Shoo can have a relaxing day. Sunghoon and Sarang go to Osaka, Japan to visit his parents. Sarang has a judo match with her grandfather. Haru's friend comes to her home. They have a fun day karaoking. Guest stars: Jang Yun-jeong, Do Kyung Wan, Shoo and her daughters & son
35	"No Pain, No Gain"	13 July 2014	11.8%
Hwijae and his wife continue to have a fun afternoon with their twins and Shoo's twin daughters. Sarang goes shopping for swimwear with her grandparents and sees her grandfather's romantic side towards her grandmother. Sunghoon coaches judo to students. Haru attends a children's play group and later goes bare hand fishing with her dad. Ilgook takes the triplets out to an enjoyable buffet lunch. Later at home he tries to teach them to play soccer. Yunjeong finally gives birth to her son with an emotional Kyungwan by her side. Guest stars: Jang Yun-jeong, Do Kyung Wan, Shoo and her daughters & husband Lim Hyo-Sung
36	"I'm Happier Today"	20 July 2014	12.9%
Choi Hong-man visits the twins' home again, now that the twins have grown they don't seem to remember him. Later Hwijae brings the twins to the mega market, Seojun is excited to explore the market and starts to wander around store. Haru and her dad are still at their farm visit. She plays with ducks and has a lunch made from the fishes she caught. Sarang goes swimming with her dad and grandparents, later she celebrates her grandmother's birthday with the rest of her family. Ilgook takes the triplets to the mega market and their daycare. Time and time again Manse testes his dad's patience when he refuses to obey. Yunjeong and Kyungwan can't get enough of their newborn son, they constantly admire him and have a photoshoot for him. Guest stars: Choi Hong-man
37	"Slow Steps"	27 July 2014	11.5%
Sarang spends a day at the zoo with some of her daycare friends and has an eating competition with one of her friends. Hwijae and the twins go to the park where the twins show their climbing ability. Ilgook takes the triplets to the dentist where the 3 boys instantly get scared, but Ilgook is able to calm them by bribing them with a delicious meal. Haru and Tablo bring two new pet birds home but one pet dies the next day. Yunjeong and her newborn son leave the hospital and stay at Kyungwan's parents' home for awhile.
38	"How To Beat Mom"	3 August 2014	14.8%
Yunjeong and Kyungwan finally bring Kkom-kkomyi home after staying at Kyungwan's parents' home. Later Yunjeong's friend trot singer Park Hyun-bin comes to meet Kkom-kkomyi. Hwijae brings the twins to a learning center where they play with raw flour. Sunghoon brings Sarang along to the gym so he can spend an afternoon training. Haru and Tablo go clam digging. Ilgook and the triplets have a fun day at the water park. Guest stars: Park Hyun-bin
39	"Daddy's Weight"	10 August 2014	13.9%
Yunjeong and Kyungwan bring Kkom-kkomyi to his first check up. Ilgook take the triplets to the park where he tires himself by chasing after each triplet. Afterwards he gives each of them a bath. Sunghoon takes Sarang to meet one of his childhood heroes. Later Sunghoon's friend Jang Keun-suk pays a visit to the Choo home, where Sarang ignores him but her mom Shiho shows her fangirl side. Haru and Tablo visit Hyejung at her film set. Haru shows her jealous side when one of the child actors seems to be close to her mother. Hwijae takes the twins to a puppy pet shop where the boys have fun playing with the puppies. Later Hwijae and his wife take the twins to Namsan Seoul Tower to celebrate the twins 500th day and leave a loving message on a lock. Yunjeong, Kyungwan and Kkom-kkomyi say their goodbyes as this is their last episode. Guest stars: Jang Keun-suk, Jang Hun
40	"A Midsummer Night's Dream"	17 August 2014	14.5%
Hwijae and Jeongwon teach the twins to use a fork on their own. Later Hwijae brings the twins to the 2014 K League All-Star Game, where the twins get to meet all the players and have their jerseys signed. Seojun gets a taste of chocolate for the first time when some of the players offer him a mini Snickers bar. Ilgook takes the triplets to a children's salon to get their hair cut. Later he takes them for a trail hike. DJ Tukutz and his son Yunu arrives early at Haru's home for a fun day with Tablo and Haru at the water park. Shiho takes over 48-hour single parent duty for Sunghoon because he has to train for his upcoming MMA fight. Shiho participates in Sarang's Korean lessons and later Shiho and Sarang have a fun day with her younger cousin. Guest stars: Park Ji-sung, Guus Hiddink, 2014 K League All-Star Game players, DJ Tukutz with his son Kim Yunu, Lee Dong-gook
41	"Travel Together to Travel Far"	24 August 2014	15.5%
Ilgook teaches the triplets to ride tricycles. With help from local neighborhood kids who are order than the triplets, Daehan, Minguk, and Manse eventually learn to pedal their tricycles. Hwijae and the twins meet up with actress Shin Aera and her daughters to have fun at a teepee resort. Shiho and Sarang head to the park with her cousin to have an enjoyable afternoon. Later Sarang's grandparents arrive from Osaka to take her camping. Tablo and Haru learn to make tofu. Hyejung surprises them the next day by having an indoor camping experience. Guest stars: Shin Ae-ra with her daughters Cha Ye-jin & Ye-eun
42	"I Will Always Root For You"	31 August 2014	14.8%
Hwijae lets the twins eat on their own at a restaurant. Later together with the twins' mom, they go to a pool for a swim. Ilgook has to take photos of the triplets for their passports, but has a hard time when none of them will sit still. Sarang's grandparents takes her to visit her dad while he is training for his fight. Later they meet up with Shiho for a day of sight seeing at the Tokyo Tower. Tablo, Haru and Hyejung have a fun day at the beach.
43	"The Neighborhood is Needed to Raise One Child, Part 1"	7 September 2014	12.4%
All four "Superman" family gather at KBS headquarter studio for a special 1 year anniversary of the show. The parents reflect their time on the show and answer studio audiences questions. Guest stars: Yoon Jong-shin, Goo Ha-ra, Park Ji Yoon, Shoo with twin daughters Lim Ra-hee & Lim Ra-yool, Jang Yun-jeong & Do Kyung Wan with their son Do Yeon-Nu (Kkom-kkomyi)
44	"The Neighborhood is Needed to Raise One Child, Part 2"	14 September 2014	16.9%
A behind the scenes look of the 1 year anniversary show. The kids play back stage at KBS headquarters. Sarang and Yuto go on a floating boat restaurant and hear their favorite song being performed. Ilgook play a pretend crocodile game with the triplets and later take them out for Korean barbecue. Hwijae takes the twins out for their first ever taste of Samgyetang. Guest stars:Jang Yun-jeong & Do Kyung Wan
45	"A Brand New World"	21 September 2014	12.5%
Shiho and Sarang continue their fun in Korea with Yuto. Hwijae takes the twins on their first subway ride and visit Olympic park for a nice picnic. Ilgook brings the triplets to a petting zoo and later the mud flats. Tablo takes Haru to the dentist and later to a historic park.
46	"Raising Kids Makes Life a Joy"	28 September 2014	20.7%
The Lee twins' uncle pay a visit to their home again, but the twins end up ignoring him. Later Hwijae brings the twins to Korean celebrity food personality Lee Hye Jung's cooking studio. Shiho and Sarang learn to make kimchi together with her grandparents. Ilgook brings the triplets to a live Robocar Poli show. Tablo and Haru meet up with her grandfather and uncle to enjoy a seafood meal together. Guest stars: Lee Hye Jung
47	"That's How Love Began"	5 October 2014	16.2%
Ilgook takes the triplets to a grape vineyard to make a birthday gift for his wife. While making a card for his wife the triplets ruin the couch. Sarang and her grandparents visit Shiho during her photo shoot. Tablo takes Haru to a music concert where other musical acts befriend her. Hwijae takes the twins on a trail hike and later to the gym to look for their mother. SungHoon's fight weigh in is shown at the end. Guest stars: Jonghyun of SHINee, Sunny from Girls' Generation, Mithra Jin & DJ Tukutz from Epik High
48	"Dads are the Toughest Men in the World"	12 October 2014	17.5%
The twins' mom dresses them in girls dresses to model for Hwijae. Ilgook carries all three triplets while running the torch for the "17th Asian Games Incheon 2014" ceremony. Tablo and Haru go to the mud flats to have fun. Sarang and her mother invite friends to their home to anticipate SungHoon's fight match.
49	"Children Grow on the Road"	26 October 2014^{2}	16.5%
Ilgook and the triplets go to a nun monastery where Minguk shows off his aegyo charm. SungHoon returns to 48 hours daddy duty and takes Sarang to a nature discovery exhibition. Hwijae and the twins go to the zoo where they meet an intelligent orangutan. Tablo and Haru visit a tea farm where they pick tea leaves.
50	"Growing Up With Compliments"	2 November 2014	17.8%
Hwijae takes the twins to the dentist. Later Seojun gives Seoeon a taste of his own medicine when he takes a spatula from him and teases him with the item. Sarang shows her love for the Song triplets and tells her dad that she likes all three brothers above all. Ilgook takes the triplets to a medical checkup where they showed fear in the beginning but leave happy. Haru and her parents continue to enjoy their country adventure.
51	"Keep It A Secret From Mom"	9 November 2014	16.3%
Sarang and SungHoon start the day making kimbap rolls for a fun day at the park where they have a picnic and have a fun time catching dragonflies. The twins and their parents head to a school with a tense feeling hanging between the adults. Hwijae later takes the twins for a ballets lesson. Ilgook takes his triplets to the world cup stadium and lets them drive automated toy cars around the area. Haru and Tablo practice for her first pitch at a baseball game. Later on they prepare a surprise for HyeJung by inviting her to their Jeju Island trip.
52	"It's Great To Be Together"	16 November 2014	17.0%
Tablo and family go to Jeju Island and visit a tangerine farm, picking delicious fruits for the Superman families while eating some as they go. Sean and his kids pay a visit to Ilgook and the triplets' home. Later both families participate in a marathon race for a good cause. Hwijae takes the twins to a vegetable farm where they pick, wash and eat the vegetables while getting wet in the process. Sarang and Sunghoon are on a farm where, like the twins, are picking their own vegetables and having fun while doing it together. At the end we see Hwijae and the twins buying gifts for their visit to the triplets and Ilgook home. Guest stars: Sean with his kids Ha Eum, Ha Rang, Ha Yul and Ha El
53	"A Very Special Day"	23 November 2014	16.0%
Hwijae and the twins visit the Song's. Both families donate their old children's clothes to be sold at the flea market for a good cause. Sarang's family celebrates her 3rd birthday and her aunt introduces her fiancee to Sunghoon. Tablo and Haru continue their fun adventure in Jeju Island with Hyejung. Haru and family go to the aquarium where Haru swims with the dolphins.
54	"Dads Make Their Children Dreams"	30 November 2014	15.2%
Tablo takes Haru to the doctor's office for a check up and to get her shots. The two later ride the metro. Sunghoon and Sarang head to a hot spring. Father and daughter enjoy the nice autumn atmosphere in the countryside. The twins can't wait for dad to get home. Seojun becomes fascinated with the mobile phone while having a video chat with Hwijae. Later Hwijae goes for a checkup at the optometrist where he finds out his eyesight has worsened. Ilgook takes the triplets to a dinosaur themed park. The triplets become frightened when one of the dinosaurs come alive. The Song's later go to a dumpling restaurant where the triplets and Ilgook show their huge appetite by devouring 8 orders of steamed dumplings.
55	"A Good Path Is One Taken Together"	7 December 2014	16.9%
Taeyang becomes Haru's babysitter when Tablo becomes busy while working on his new album. Sarang has a fun day at a park with her friend Yuto. Later Sarang shows her braveness when Sunghoon takes her to the doctor's office for a check up and shots, and she doesn't throw a fit. The twins head to Busan with dad and their grandfather to visit the naval museum and see the ship grandpa was assigned to. The triplets visit the countryside where they participate in making red bean stew and eat roasted bugs for the first time. Later Ilgook prepares to make a calendar featuring the triplets but has a hard time getting them to pose correctly. Guest stars: Taeyang from Big Bang, Mithra Jin & DJ Tukutz from Epik High
56	"If By Life You Were Deceived"	14 December 2014	17.0%
The Choo family dog has puppies. Later Sunghoon takes Sarang and her friend Yuto "trick or treating" for Halloween. Haru continues spending time with Taeyang while Tablo works on his album. Ilgook tries hard to get the triplets to pose properly for his calendar. Hwijae and the twins are still in Busan with their grandfather. Their mom arrives to join the trip. The twins have their first taste of spicy food which Seojun is able to distinguish right away while Seoeon does not feel anything. Later the Lee's take a family portrait and their grandfather takes a portrait to be used at his future funeral. Guest stars: Taeyang from Big Bang, DJ Tukutz from Epik High
57	"Love Actually"	21 December 2014	17.6%
The Lee twins get new hair cuts from their mom. Later Hwijae tries to get the twins in the Christmas spirit by having them draw pictures but Seojun has mischievous plans with the crayons. Hwijae then takes them Christmas tree and ornament shopping but also has a hard time decorating the tree when the twins do not cooperate. The Song boys visit the Choo family in Japan. Minguk and Sarang engage in a strawberry eating battle while Manse becomes friends with Sarang. Haru and Tablo go to the zoo where it is decorated for the holidays. Tablo dresses as Santa Claus again but this time Haru recognizes him right away.
58	"Happier Day By Day"	28 December 2014	19.6%
The Song boys continue their visit to the Choo family home in Japan. Sarang helps Ilgook shop for groceries and shows her hospitality to the triplets by offering them chocolate. Shiho shows up to help celebrate Christmas with her family and the Song's. Hwijae and the twins attend Kim In-seok's wedding. He also teaches the twins to bow properly in a show of respect for New Year's and later they go on a mountain hike and watch the sunset to look back at the year. Tablo and Haru visit and pay their respect at his father's grave. Tablo, Haru and Hyejung celebrate Christmas together with a cake and say their goodbyes to the show. Guest stars: Kim Sook, comedian Kim In-seok, Oh Nami, Lee Sang-ho, Lee Sang-min, Shoo with twin daughters Lim Ra-hee & Lim Ra-yool and son Lim Yu via video chat, Jang Yun-jeong & Do Kyung Wan with son Do Yeon-Nu (Kkom-kkomyi) via video chat

== 2015 ==
No.	Title	Original release date	Rating
59	"In Between Fear And Excitement"	4 January 2015	18.1%
Uhm Taewoong and Uhm Jion's premiere episode. The Uhm family move into their new home but it is not quite ready as there is a lot fixing up that needs to be done. The Song's have left the Choo home, but Sarang seems to miss the chaos the triplets created at her home. She also tells her dad that Manse is now her favorite Song triplet. Later father and daughter go to a pottery shop to make a gift for mom Shiho. Meanwhile the Song's are still in Japan enjoying a day at the aquarium where Daehan shows a lot of interest in the attractions. Ilgook treats the triplets to gyozas and breaks his vegetarian diet when Daehan feeds him a dumpling. Later the Song's go to stay at a hotspring inn where Ilgook ask the triplets if they could try getting off using diapers for the new year. Hwijae brings the twins to an observation deck to look at Seoul's nightlight, but both Seojun and Seoeon show more interest in the automatic candy machines. Later, the Lees write their New Year's resolution and have a fun day at the park.
60	"Look Forward To It"	11 January 2015	18.7%
Taewoong's 48 hours of child care duty begins. He takes Jion to the local park where he has trouble changing her diaper. Later when he is feeding dinner to Jion he is touched and surprised that she is able to mimic his actions while he was cooking. Sarang plays dress up with her mom. Her friend Yuto comes over to help take her of the newborn puppies and participate in Sarang's Korean lessons. Hwijae shows the twins how to dry laundry. Later he takes them out for a restaurant to have a Korean feast. Major League Baseball player Hyun-jin Ryu visit the Song home. Guest stars: Hyun-jin Ryu
61	"Growing Up Fast"	18 January 2015	19.1%
Taewoong potty trains Jion, later the two go grocery shopping and he child proofs the home while Jion is taking a nap. Sarang visits her older cousin Yume in Kyoto, Japan. While there she also meets up with her other maternal relatives (her great-great grandmother, grandmother, and uncle). The two have fun wearing hanboks, also her cousin Yume gets to see Sarang's huge eating appetite. Hwijae brings the twins to a bakery where they let you decorate your own cake. Hwijae wants to decorate a cake for his friend Yoon Hyung Bin's son 100th day but the twins won't stop eating the icing cream on the cake. The Song's are still enjoying their time with Hyun-jin Ryu. Later Ilgook takes the triplets skiing. Guest stars: Hyun-jin Ryu, Yoon Hyung Bin & Jung Kyung Mi with their son Yoon Joon
62	"Today Was Another Great Day"	25 January 2015	19.7%
Taewoong takes Jion out for noodles, where she shows her unique way of eating. Later the novice dad gives her a bath but make her cry when he can't avoid getting shampoo in her eyes. Sarang continues her visit at her maternal relatives home in Kyoto. Her Great-grandmother and Grandmother learn a few Korean words to communicate with her. Later Shiho arrives and the entire family visit her elementary school. Ilgook brings the triplets to a village where the boys are transformed into ancient Joseon scholars. Minguk can't stop crying after he gets scolded by the teacher for painting the floor with black ink. Hwijae takes the twins to a cat cafe with get them familiar with cats. Seojun shows his mischievous side when he won't stop knocking down blocks that Seoeon is playing with.
63	"A Whole New World With Dad"	1 February 2015	19.8%
Jion shows off her dance talents at a ballet class. Later she goes to the doctor's office and shows her braveness when she hardly cries. Hwijae and the twins goes to the Noryangjin fish market to explore. Seojun shows his curiosity and fearlessness when he asks his dad about the all species and touches all of them without fear. He also shows his pickiness for food when he refuses to eat any of the delicious cooked seafood dad has brought, instead sternly demands to only eat a corn dish. Sarang and Sunghoon are in Korea, first they have a meal with well known actor Cha Seung-won and later visit the Song residence. Sarang has fun with the triplets and Manse shows his adoration for her. Guest stars: Cha Seung-won
64	"Children Grow Together"	8 February 2015	19.5%
The Song and the Choo family go skiing together. Manse shows his caring side by looking out for and helping Sarang throughout their ski trip. Later both families have fun making mandu from scratch. Hwijae and the twins go strawberry picking. Hwijae makes jam from the strawberries he and the twins have picked as a gift for Taewoong and Jion whom they will visit later. While Seojun makes friends with a little girl, Seoeon becomes dazed from over eating too much strawberries. Taewoong and Jion bring the family dog Saebom to a dog training center. Later the Lee's visit the Uhm family home. The twins make friends with Jion who is the same age as them and the Uhm family pet Saebom.
65	"Just Like Now"	15 February 2015	18.9%
Hwijae and the twins are still at the Uhm's. Hwijae takes Soeoen and Jion out grocery shopping with him while Taewoong tries to babysit Seojun, who keeps asking for his dad. After leaving the Uhm's, Hwijae takes the twins to a traditional Korean Sauna. Seoeon shows his flirtatious side again by playing with older girls, while Seojun also shows he has a flirtatious side by interacting with the older girls. Taewoong and Jion prepare the house to celebrate Hyejin's birthday. Jion has her first taste of spicy kimchi. Choo's are still at the Song's. After eating the mandu they made they go for a boat ride. Soon Shiho arrives at the Choo's to say goodbye with Sunghoon and Sarang to the Choo's.
66	"It's A First For Dad Too"	22 February 2015	17.6%
Hyejin prepares breakfast for Taewoong and Jion before both father and daughter are off to swimming lessons. Later Taewoong phones his older sister Uhm Jung Hwa via video chat to greet each other for Lunar New Year. Sarang and Sunghoon are in Asahikawa, Japan to visit the Asahiyama Zoo where Sarang looks forward to seeing the penguin attraction. Manse shows he misses Sarang and insist on sitting at her seat when she visited the Song's. Ilgook brings the triplets camping, before arriving at the camp site he brags about being an expert camper but has trouble pitching the tent, setting up equipment and preparing food once they are at the camp site. Hwijae plays a flash card game with the twins and is surprised when he finds out how intelligent Seojun is. The Lee's go to the Tteok & Kitchen Utensil Museum to learn how to make home made tteok. Guest stars: Uhm Jung-hwa via video chat
67	"Who Do You Take After?"	1 March 2015	16.6%
The Lees goes ice fishing and Seojun shows he is quite skill at it. After finishing fishing they feast on their catch where the twins are curious about tasting chili sauce. Seojun has figured out how to turn the lights on at home and refuses to go to sleep during bedtime. Later Hwijae brings the twins to a play center that specialize in children's play vehicles. The Choos are still at Hokkaido. Father and daughter have a fun chat during a hot bowl of ramen, the next day the two participate in a DIY chocolate course. Taewoong invites his former 2 Days & 1 Night castmate Cha Tae-hyun and his daughters to his home to keep Jion company. Taewoong cook a delicious duck stew meal for his guest which causes Tae-hyun's toddler daughter Su-jin to continuous suck on the duck bones. Ilgook takes the triplets to a dojang for Taekwondo lessons. Later at home Ilgook once again teaches the triplets how to put on their own diaper and pants. Guest stars: Cha Tae-hyun with daughters Cha Tae-eun & Cha Su-jin
68	"The Sound of Spring Approaching"	8 March 2015	17.1%
The Lees goes to an art center to make a birthday gift for mom. The Lees also invite all their close neighbors for a get together and to say their goodbyes before they move to their new home. Sarang and Sunghoon dine on king crab legs. During a conversation with dad, Sarang confesses that she now likes Manse more than Mom and Dad which surprises Sunghoon. After having a fun day with their guess the Chas, Jion and Taewoong enjoy a quiet evening watching The Return of Superman. While watching a past episode showing her dad falling asleep, Jion breaks into tears. The Songs head to the Shin-gi Market in Incheon to explore. While exploring they get side tracked by food and downed 16 skewers of fishcake and then dined at a restaurant that specialize in dishes made from pig. Guest stars: Cha Tae-hyun with daughters Cha Tae-eun & Cha Su-jin
69	"When Did They Grow So Big?"	15 March 2015	15.9%
Taewoong brings Jion to a storybook village to take photographs of her to update her baby book. Sunghoon takes Sarang to the dentist where she shows she has grown a bit as she did not cry. Later they head to the park to enjoy the cherry blossoms. The Lees move into their new home and later they invite the Songs over to celebrate the twins and triplets birthday together. Before heading to the Lees, the triplets learns to quit using diapers with disastrous results from Manse.
70	"Like a Sturdy Tree"	22 March 2015	16.4%
Taewoong and Jion head to a floral nursery to pick out plants and trees to plant in their back yard. Later Taewoong's father-in-law veteran actor Yoon Il-Bong stops by their house to play with Jion. After enjoying her mango breakfast Sarang helps her dad Sunghoon clean the dishes, later they head to an interactive art exhibit where it inspires Sunghoon and Sarang to create their own artwork at home. The Songs and Lees are still together celebrating the triplets and twins birthdays together. Afterwards the Lees head to a farm where they learn to make tufu the ancient way, while the Songs head to the beach to take pictures. Guest stars: Yoon Il-Bong
71	"One Step at a Time"	29 March 2015	15.9%
The Lees meet up with singer Sung Dae-hyun, Seoeon shows his flirtatious side again as a nuna lover with Dae-hyun's daughter Ah-young. Later Hwijae brings the twins to soccer great Song Chong-gug's soccer camp where both twins shows great potential in soccer. Taewoong puts his handy skills to work by building an outdoor playhouse and swing for Jion. Later he shows off his gardening skills to Hyejin when she returns home. The Songs ride the public bus to the bus driver examination course for Ilgook to take his bus driver test. Later the triplets attend a ballerina class where Manse shows off his martial art skills. Sarang has a fun play date with her dad where they play cake shop. Guest stars: Sung Dae-hyun with daughter Ah-young, Song Chong-gug
72	"I Can Do It"	5 April 2015	15.2%
After mimicking her mother cooking and having breakfast, Sarang and Sunghoon head to a strawberry farm to pick strawberries. Later they go to a rock climbing gym. Hwijae takes the twins to a children's play group gym where Seojun shows his athleticism while Seoeon flirts with the girls. Later the Lees go to a restaurant to dine on roast duck, the twins shows their huge appetite by devouring all the food. The Songs go hiking with the triplets preschool classmates. Later at home Ilgook teaches the triplets about sharing. The Uhms go on a picnic at a park where they get to feed ostriches. Later at home Taewoong's older sister actress-singer Uhm Junghwa comes over to his house to bond with Jion. Guest stars: Uhm Jung-hwa
73	"I Do It Because I'm Dad"	12 April 2015	15.1%
Sarang's cousin Yume visits her in Tokyo. Sarang is extremely happy to see Yume, after a delicious lunch prepared by Sunghoon the girls and their dads go to a dress up photo studio to have pictures of them as princesses taken. Hwijae wants to invite his friends over to his new home for a house warming party. Not the greatest cook he ask his friend Kim Ji-woo what he should make, she then suggested he talk to her husband, celebrity chef Raymon Kim. After picking up ingredients at the supermarket, Hwijae and the twins head to the Kims home for a lesson in spaghetti making. Taewoong's older sister Uhm Junghwa is still visiting him. He leaves Jion in Junghwa's care while he heads out to pick up dinner. The Songs go to an exotic petting zoo where there are snakes, aquatic creatures, bunnies and turtles. Daehan shows no fear, wanting to touch every animal. Later that night at home, Ilgook performs a puppet show for the triplets. Guest stars: Uhm Jung-hwa, Chef Raymon Kim & Kim Ji-woo with their daughter Lua Nari
74	"The Person Who Makes Me Happy"	19 April 2015	17.5%
Hwijae invites his friends over to his new home for a home cooked meal prepared by himself. While his guest wait for dinner to be ready, Hwijae serves them japchae to enjoy, Seojun shows his mischievous by stealing noodles from Kim Hyun Chul's bowl. After their fun day at the photo studio Sunghoon takes Yume and his brother-in-law to a Korean restaurant for dinner. While Yume eats gracefully, Sarang chows down her food. After a fun sleepover with her cousin, Sarang is sad when Yume has to leave. After taking the triplets weight and measurements, Ilgook decides to weigh himself and sees that he has gained weight. He takes the triplets with him to do some outdoor exercise, but a hard day of workout is gone to waste when the Songs go to a mandu restaurant and downs ten orders of dumplings and two bowls of noodles. Taewoong says goodbye to his sister who leaves after visiting him and Jion. The next day the Uhms go to a piggy petting zoo. Guest stars: Uhm Jung-hwa, Sung Dae-hyun with daughter Ah-young, Kim Hyun Chul with wife and daughter, Lee Hoon
75	"Children Grow With Nature"	26 April 2015	14.6%
The "Superman" families head to Jeju Island for a get together. After landing at the island chaos ensues with fans gathering at the airport to greet the families and the dads trying to keep the children in tabs while walking to their transportation bus. Ilgook who recently got his bus driver license volunteers to drive the families to their first destination which is a seafood restaurant to have lunch. After lunch the families split up into two group with the younger group, Lees and Uhms heading to the beach to go deep sea diving, while the older kids the Choos and Songs go to the aquarium to play with dolphins.
76	"Even If You Don't Remember"	3 May 2015	14.9%
After both groups finish having dinner, they head to their home-stay on Jeju Island. While Sarang, Deahan and Jion are sleeping, Minguk, Manse and the twins are wide awake and want to stay up late to play. The next morning Sunghoon and Taewoong volunteers to cook breakfast, after breakfast all four families go to the scenic Jeju Museum of Contemporary Art to have group and individual pictures taken. After all four dads hectically try to get all the children to stay still long enough to take a group picture the families split up to do their own activity. The Lees head to Cheonjeyeon Waterfalls to take in the beautiful sight of the waterfall, while the Songs go fishing in the ocean.
77	"Four Families Under One Roof"	10 May 2015	12.6%
Continuing in the day, Taewoong takes Jion to the house where he filmed Architecture 101, later Ilgook invites the Uhms to go climb the hills of Yongnuni Oreum with him and the triplets. Hwijae and the twins visits his friend Heo Su-gyeong who lives on the island with her daughter Byeol. The last time the Lees visited Su-gyeong, Seoeon showed much interest in Byeol, but this time around both him and Seojun are more interested in the banana she is eating. Meanwhile Sunghoon and Sarang go horseback riding and later the Seogwipo Olle Market to pick up ingredients for that night's dinner and a cake for Taewoong's surprise birthday party. Seojun shows his mischievous side again by grabbing a handful of cake meant for Jion, but this time Hwijae catches him and lectures him on his misbehavior. While Sunghoon was at the market he also brought specialty gifts only available in Jeju Island for all the children, which is clothes dyed with persimmon. The next morning while all the families are still sleeping the wives arrives at the home-stay. Guest stars: Heo Su-gyeong with her daughter Byeol
78	"Already One Year"	17 May 2015	13.3%
The Moms/Wives pay a surprise visit to Jeju Island and cooks breakfast before everyone is awake. After breakfast the Superman families return to their homes. Ilgook takes the triplets on a sight seeing tour of Seoul. Their first stop is Gyeongbokgung Palace, which they dress in traditional hanbok to enter the palace. At the end of their tour Ilgook treats the triplets to their first braised beef short-ribs. Watching the triplets eat causes Ilgook to almost break his diet. Hwijae has been invited back to throw out the first pitch at a baseball game, but he has the twins throw out the pitch this time. While the twins practiced pitching and seemed ready for the event, Seoeon gets nervous and overwhelmed at the last minute leaving Seojun to go at it alone, which he does successfully. After a year Sunghoon brings Sarang back to a gymnastic class. Last year she could not follow the lessons but this year with her friend Yuto by her side she does great. Taewoong and Jion set up a lunch date with his mother, but before meeting with her they shop at a department store for a gift for his mom.
79	"Don't Grow Up Too Fast"	24 May 2015	12.6%
Ilgook has a "Little Mermaid" themed photo-shoot with the triplets. He has the triplets dress up as various characters from the story. Later that evening he decides that the triplets are now old enough to eat at the dining table and teaches them about table etiquette. Baekhyun and Chanyeol from Exo visits the Lees' to help babysit the twins. After playing with the twins and time for lunch, Chanyeol takes Seojun grocery shopping with him and is surprised when Seojun seems to be more popular than him. After finishing shopping and returning to the Lee home, both Exo members help to cook lunch and feed the twins. Sarang celebrates her friend Yuto's birthday by singing a song she made up. Later Sarang, Sunghoon and Grandpa Choo visit a shop that lets them get up close with all kinds of owls. Taewoong takes Jion to a child development center and is disappointed in himself as a parent when he finds out that she is behind in socializing skills with others. Guest stars: Baekhyun & Chanyeol from Exo
80	"Dad's Imagination Becomes Reality"	31 May 2015	14.2%
Hwijae brings the twins to a water park. The twins who love to splash water are unfamiliar with the water park environment. Later the Lees enjoy a roasted pig shank dinner. The next day they meet up with mom for an enjoyable family day at a flower garden park. Ilgook takes the triplets to a tap dance class since he and his wife had enjoyed the activity years ago. Later he takes the triplets to the doctor's office to get their shoots, all three boys show fear once they see the needle. Sarang, Sunghoon and Grandpa Choo head out on a fishing trip in Yokohama. Sunghoon gets lucky when he catches fish after fish. Later the Choos have an enjoyable lunch at their future brother/son-in-law's restaurant. Taewoong shows his handiness when his entire backyard has been fixed up. He and Jion have a fun time bathing the dogs. Later he brings Jion to the zoo where they get to feed the animals. Later that night they meet up with mom for dinner.
81	"You Can Do It"	7 June 2015	13.7%
The twins get a summer haircut. Afterwards Hwijae takes them shopping and brings them to visit his former High School teachers home. Shiho invites all the moms to visit Japan. The Choos di some fitness at home with Shiho teaching Sarang yoga moves. Later Sunghoon takes Sarang bike riding at the park. Later that night, Sarang decides to give her dad a makeover. The triplets go to a simulation fireman play center to learn about fire rescue. Later the Songs go grocery shopping for chicken ginseng soup ingredients. Taewoong's friend and former 2 Days & 1 Night cast member Sung Si-kyung visits their home. He gifts Jion a make believe princess play-set and cooks lunch for them. Guest stars: Sung Si-kyung
82	"We Really Look Good Together"	14 June 2015	14.2%
The Lees are still at Hwijae's former teacher's home. Hwijae cooks dinner for his former teacher while struggle to cook on a rural stove. Taewoong and Sung Si-kyung work together to get Join's toy un-stuck from the ceiling. Ilgook participates in a triathlon competition. He has each of the twins accompany in each different category. The Choos invite the Sarang's cousins over. Sunghoon has fun playing DJ while the kids dance to the music. Guest stars: Sung Si-kyung, Sean
83	"Dad Doesn't Get Tired"	21 June 2015	14.5 %
The Lees goes to a petting zoo and the twins get their very first horse ride. Sunghoon takes Sarang and her friend Yuto to the park to play. Later at home Sarang and her mom Shiho have a cheongsam dress fashion show at home. Ilgook and the triplets continues with the triathlon competition, afterwards they have a buffet meal. Jion and Taewoong enjoy a beautiful in their backyard with the family dogs. Later Taewoong takes Jion to a children's play gym to socialize with other kids. Later they make posters to welcome mom back from her trip. Guest stars: Sean
84	"Raise Them Tough and They Become Strong"	28 June 2015	13.5 %
The twins have fun at their music and dance play group after enjoying dancing at home with dad. Later Hwijae takes the twins to Busan for a guys only trip. Twins get excited until they arrive at their hotel room. the twins complain about the interior of their hotel room which forces Hwijae to do last minute redecorating to satisfy the twins. Shiho and her mother-in-law have a cook off and ask Sunghoon to critique whose cooking tastes better. Later, Sunghoon wanting Sarang to taste an Osaka specialty takes her to a restaurant that specializes in Takoyaki and Okonomiyaki. The Songs head to the countryside to experience summer country life. The triplets gets their hands dirty while helping the farmer plant rice at the paddy field. Ilgook also tries his hand at making homemade noodles. The Uhms also head to the countryside, they go to a petting zoo where Jion gets to ride a pony. Later both father and daughter goes to a place that reminds them of the 90s.
85	"Off On A Trip"	5 July 2015	14.1%
The Lees wake up to rainy Busan weather. Unable to enjoy the because they head there anyway and have a wet sand fight. Later Hwijae takes the twins to Gamcheon Culture Village to create many photo memories. Seojun mistakes the Little Prince statue as mom. The Songs are enjoying Ilgooks handmade noodles for dinner their first night in the countryside. The next day the Songs go to the mudflats to dig for clams. The Choos takes Sarang cousins camping. Sunghoon gives the children a task to get snacks and sauce at the local store. Taewoong takes Jion to a potato farm and Jion has fun with the potatoes they dig up.
86	"Gift From Time"	12 July 2015	17.5 %
Hwijae treats the twins to sweets and an exciting light show. On they're last day in Busan, the weather is finally beautiful and they head to the beach where Hwijae gives the twins a taste in marine training. The Songs end their countryside trip, later they head to a sauna where Ilgook gives the triplets a lesson on money when he gives each a mission on buying snacks . The Uhms, wanting to experience camping decide to set up camp on the roof of their house. Taewoong shows his outdoor cooking skills when making a beer can roasted chicken for dinner. The Choos have an enjoyable hike in the woods, later they prepare a surprise for Shiho to celebrate her birthday.
87	"About Time"	19 July 2015	13.7%
After being ignored at home, Hwijae uses a giant balloon toy to get the twins attention. Later, Hwijae takes the twins to the river to enjoy a hot summer cooling. He lets them have a whole half of watermelon and then gives them soda for the first time. The Choos have moved into their new home. Later Sunghoon brings Sarang and her friend Yuto for kendo lessons. The Songs go camping again, but this time Ilgook is better prepared than last time. This time he brings a portable trailer with them instead of setting up a tent. The Songs also try to gather food from the wilderness by fishing and picking berries. Taewoong brings Jion to his hometown and visit the school where his late father was a teacher. Stories from his late father's colleagues brings him to emotion tears since his father dead when he was less than a year old.
88	"Just Like Now"	26 July 2015	15.5%
A very fashionable Sarang and Sunghoon dine on Sōmen noodles, The experience of have to catch your noodles in a bamboo river gets Sarang excited. The Songs are still enjoying their camping trip. Ilgook makes a game of finding items in the forest to keep the triplets occupied. Later the Songs go to a salon for the triplets to get their hair cuts. Looking at female wigs Ilgook gets an idea and puts a wig on each of his sons, pretending them to be daughters. Hwijae takes the twins out to have cake, after returning home mom Jeongwon, tells Hwijae that her old college friend Jeong Changuk who is now a celebrity chef will be stopping by their home to teach Hwijae to cook a healthy meal. Taewoong and Jion are still visiting his old hometown. Jion falls in love and takes care of the puppies at their home-stay house. While eating at a restaurant Taewoong meets the owner who happens to be a former classmate of his older sister Junghwa. A short preview is shown of new Superman Lee Donggook's big family. Guest stars: Uhm Jung-hwa via phone call, Chef Jeong Chang-uk
89	"Dads Are Men"	2 August 2015	15.3%
Taewoong takes Jion to his favorite childhood summer spot. Father and daughter enjoy a nice cool dip in the stream and later enjoy a seafood meal. Jeong Changuk tries to get close with the twins while teaching Hwijae how to make multiple healthy chicken dishes. Ilgook and the triplets set a re-marriage proposal for their mom. Later the Songs dine at a noodle restaurant, Ilgook decides to participate in the noodle eating contest the restaurant has. Later they go to the airport to pick up the Sungs and Yuto who are visiting from Japan. Lee Donggook and his big family makes their debut. Donggook's first task is to make breakfast for his kids. He finds the task hard as he is not familiar around the kitchen, with the help of his older twin daughters Jaesi and Jaeah he manages to make scramble eggs for everyone. Guest stars: Chef Jeong Chang-uk
90	"A Big Happy Family"	9 August 2015	14.4%
The triplets meet Sarang and Yuto once again! Song Ilkook prepares and visits an etiquette school for the children. A fierce teacher appears in front of the triplets and Yuto and Sarang. His words make the kids learn the "Thousand Character Classic!" Seoeon and Seojun and Hwijae go to a mud festival to escape from summer! Unfortunately, the twins only stick to their dad and don't have fun. Will they be able to enjoy the festival? Jion and Taewoong and the Opo's 5 sibling's third Jindo dog, Namu, escape from the city and go to a pet pension to enjoy a cool swim. Will the Uhm family and Namu swim happily? Donggook, Seola, Sua and the youngest child, Daebak, visit the second child, Jaea, at the tennis court. However, during the tennis practice, Jaea breaks into tears and Donggook puts on a serious face. What has happened?
91	"People Who Make Me Stronger"	16 August 2015	14.4%
Second day of lessons at the village school for the triplets and Sarang and Yuto! Choo Sunghoon and Song Ilkook make a special health dish for the children. The actor, Ahn Jaewook, comes from afar to see Seoeon and Seojun. But when Jaewook sees the twins, they slowly run away! Taewoong is a trained horse rider through acting! This time he goes to a horse riding course with Jion! Donggook prepares a party for Seola and Sua's second birthday! They put on pretty dresses and delicious cake is ready. Guest stars: Chef Jeong Chang-uk Ahn Jae-wook
92	"You Are the Happiness"	23 August 2015	13.6%
The triplets try recording the "T-Rex Song" with the help of the hip-hop singer Sean. It's time for dinner with Uncle Jaewook for the twins. They all sit down together to have the health food Hwijae made but Seoeon is busy reading a book. Will Seojun be able to bring Seoeon back to the dinner table? Sarang and Sunghoon are out to try water sports! Wakeboarding is very hard for beginners but Sunghoon stands up with his great arm muscles and perfect pose. Taewoong has taken Jion to the cooking class! They try making rice rolls but Jion starts eating the ingredients... The 2nd part of Seola and Sua's birthday party! The kids have fun with Donggook all day with the special guest, Daebak.
93	"The Fancy Outing"	30 August 2015	14.4%
Ilkook and the triplets participate in "Box 1 Race!" They make a boat with boxes themselves and row along Hangang! Sarang and Sunghoon visit the twins' house! But suddenly a fierce chase happens? What has happened to Sarang and the twins? Jion and Taewoong have a photo shoot. It was very tough but how are the results? On the day of Donggook's soccer match, the five siblings visit their dad with the sign they made themselves! Guest stars: Guest narrator - Yoona from Girls' Generation
94	"The Value Of Being Together"	6 September 2015	14.3%
The triplets have turned into three Mickey Mice! This time, they visit a big ranch. Hwijae prepares a magic show for Sarang and Sunghoon. But he's kind of awkward. Will he be able to pull off a successful magic show? Opo's swimming pool is now open! Jion enjoys a 1-man pool in a pretty swimming suit! Seola, Sua and Daebak are at Jeonju Hanok Village. They enjoy a fun date with Donggook.
95	"Every Day is a Surprise"	13 September 2015	13.4%
The triplets have come to Gapyeong to enjoy a festival. They meet their favorite, dinosaurs, there. But suddenly a real dinosaur appears! Seoeon and Seojun transform into martial artists! They try learning manners and kicking and using nunchucks. Sarang has come to meet Girls' Generation! Sarang is very excited to meet them after a long time! Jion is off to meet the horse Louis which has a special relationship with Taewoong. She has fun receiving the love from Louis. Seola, Sua and Daebak are still in Jeongju! They enjoy red bean shaved ice and have fun playing in the water. Guest stars: Girls' Generation
96	"You're my Superstar"	20 September 2015	14.5%
Daehan, Minguk and Manse are off to Busan, where it's full of Ilkook and his wife's memories. They enjoy swimming in the beach. Seoeon and Seojun are a big fan of Lightning Man that they even go to Lightning Man performances. Hwijae prepares a surprise for the twins. Sarang prepares a secret performance and opens a nail salon just for Girls' Generation. Jion and Taewoong visit a dance studio. Jion enjoys dancing to her aunt's song. Seola, Sua and Daebak go to a market! Donggook tries choosing clothes for his kids for the first time! But Seola and Sua seem to be more interested in toys. Guest stars: Girls' Generation, Guest narrator - Yoo In-na
97	"Great Father Grandfather"	27 September 2015	10.0%
Daehan, Minguk, and Manse are still in Busan! They try fishing at the ocean! Seoeon and Seojun are off to Mungyeong, their grandpa's hometown. They visit a watermelon farm! G-dragon is here at Sarang's house! He brought a whole bunch of presents for Sarang. Jion and Taewoong are at the traditional village. They dress up in hanbok and try making rice cakes. Donggook and his five kids go on a picnic! Donggook has prepared a special bike for his kids. They have lunchbox and go sledding. Guest stars: Guest narrator - Jang Hyun-sung, G-Dragon
98	"Truth in Dad"	4 October 2015	13.4%
The triplets visit a place to experience many types of jobs. They try being dentists and also being theatrical actors! The twins are still in Mungyeong. Hwijae challenges himself in paragliding to show his dad the beautiful scenery of Mungyeong. Hwijae has acrophobia. Will he be able to do it? Sarang has turned into a dance teacher this time! G-Dragon and Sarang have fun dancing to Big Bang's songs. Jion and Taewoong are at the grape festival. They try picking grapes and even try making wine. Daebak has started to crawl around! This time, he tries walking. Will he be able to move one foot without holding Dongook's hand? Guest stars: G-Dragon
99	"Struggles Lead to a Strong Dad"	11 October 2015	18.8%
The triplets and the five siblings of Songdo have gotten together! Two dads and 8 kids! Even the experienced dads are tired to death! The twins try filming a music video for a children's song. Hwijae tries directing them himself! How will the result look? Sunghoon has become a kindergarten teacher for Sarang. And Sarang's rival appears in Sunghoon's P.E. class! Taewoong and Haejin meets Dr. Oh Eunyeong, the god of childcare. What's the right way to discipline your children?
100	"To Become a 100% Great Dad"	18 October 2015	13.4%
The triplets have become real soldiers! The scary instructor with sunglasses suddenly starts going through the triplets' belongings. And Manse suddenly starts crying! What has happened to him? Hwijae visits his school for its 50th anniversary with his twins. They say hi to Hwijae's teacher and look at Hwijae's yearbook. Meanwhile, the village school head teacher visits Sarang! Jion and Taewoong are at the vet to check Saebom's condition. Saebom gets many examinations and Taewoong and Jion are worried. Daebak's new mission! It's to climb up the sofa. He tries to go to dad sitting on the sofa. But his legs are a little bit too short...
101	"Changing Fear into Courage"	25 October 2015	14.0%
The triplets are in the army! Ilkook is worried and he tries to sneak in by a disguise. The twins have become doctors! They wear the doctor's white coat, stethoscopes and even glasses! They also try some Indian food. Sarang tries to earn the yellow belt in taekwondo. Will she be able to get it? Jion is in love with eggs now after bananas. Taewoong and Haejin tell her to not break the egg. Will Jion be able to keep the promise? Seola and Sua have transformed! They have straight hair now and they even got their nails done! Look forward to the twin girls' makeover! And Daebak gets his first haircut ever!
102	"Tug-of-War with the Kids"	1 November 2015	14.4%
It's the triplets' first time sleeping in the army! Manse holds back his tears at this unfamiliar place without his dad. Will they be able to spend their first night at the army? The twins are at the gym class with their dad! The fierce competition between Seoeon and Seojun starts! How will it end? Jion and Taewoong are at Suwon Hwaseong. Jion usually doesn't like climbing up the stairs but she tries climbing up to the top of Suwon Hwaseong! Daebak has changed! He can now easily stand up and walk around! He finds an internet router in the living room and he ends up breaking it!
103	"Wise and Gentle"	8 November 2015	14.2%
The triplets have gone to the flea market with their dad! They have become merchants and start selling their goods! Will they be able to earn a lot? Announcers Park Jiyoon and Choi Dongseok have visited the twins with their children! Hwijae falls in love with Dain and the twins get really jealous! Donggook takes the twin girls and Daebak out to the playground! He can even push two swings at the same time and he exercises with Daebak! Saebom's puppies are finally born! Jion's family have a party to celebrate this event! This is their last episode in The Return of Superman.
104	"Little Big Hero"	15 November 2015	12.9%
The triplets have come to the tomato farm. They pick tomatoes for the first time in their lives and they even make tomato jam! A talking teddy bear suddenly appeared in front of Seoeon and Seojun! And the twins get really shocked! Sarang visits her grandparents in Osaka after 10 months. She has grown a lot and she measures her height! Seola and Sua have extremely curly hair. Dongook attends a hair styling class to style the twin girls hair!
105	"Drops of Memories"	22 November 2015	13.6%
The triplets have gone to Ilkook's drama shoot set. "Please take good care of my dad!" Minguk even asks the director for a favor. And the triplets try acting! The Choos have visited the Nara Park again! Two years ago, Sarang kept crying because she was so scared. How does she react now that she's five years old? Hwijae goes to a tennis match with the twins. Seoeon and Seojun have grown a lot that they can even cheer for their dad. Look forward to Seoeon and Seojun's cute cheer! Daebak fell in love with bread! He even starts refusing baby food.
106	"The Gift of Waiting"	29 November 2015	15.1%
The triplets try acting in a historical drama, following their dad who's an actor. Manse has to even cry among the beggars. Can he be the next child prodigy in acting? The men of Choo family turn in to Mickey and Minnie Mouse to celebrate Sarang's 5th birthday. Even Shiho dresses up as Elsa from "Frozen!" How will Sarang react? The twins meet Jung Sia's daughter, Seou. How do the twins react after seeing beautiful Seou? The twin girls and Daebak go to a hanbok place to get hanbok for Daebak's first birthday party. Seola and Sua dress up in hanbok and show off their beauty. And Daebak transforms into handsome young man!
107	"The Long-Awaited Moment"	6 December 2015	14.3%
Shiho spends her time with Sarang as Sunghoon is busy getting ready for his match. They dress up in same outfits and even take sticker photos! They have a special date! To repay the love they received from everyone, the twins decide to prepare a special gift! Hwijae becomes a photographer and the twins become angels! It's the day of the marathon for Ilkook and the triplets. They get prepared and the race has begun! It's Daebak's first birthday and Donggook prepares for it. He even take first birthday pictures and practices the first grab. What did Daebak pick at his first birthday party?
108	"You are my Energy"	13 December 2015	14.6%
Sarang and Shiho have visited Sunghoon's studio. They cheer him up with great gifts. It's time for Sunghoon to become a real fighter. A robot has visited the triplets? It asks who their favorite person is and the triplets' answers surprise us. Donggook takes the twin girls and Daebak to a gym class. Daebak has a race for the first time in his life and he surprises his dad with his amazing speed! Seoeon and Seojun go around the neighborhood to give out their own special New Year's cards.
109	"The Power of Dad"	20 December 2015	13.8%
Sunghoon's match has begun with the support of everyone. He tries his best to show his effort! Shiho watches Sunghoon's match on TV and she runs off to the stadium with Sarang right after the match has finished. The 5 siblings are yearning for Christmas presents and Santa Clause appears in front of them! But his face looks familiar and he speaks in Gyeongsang-do dialect. Who is he? The twins go shopping to get snacks on their own for the first time in their lives. Will they be able to do it? The triplets have become three little reindeer. They sell cards they made themselves for donation!
110	"Miracle Made By Dad"	27 December 2015	14.8%
Hwijae and the twins have gone out to meet other twins! They meet other 4 families of twins! It's Donggook's final soccer match and the five siblings have come to the stadium! Daebak delivers the match ball! The triplets have become monks once again! They try picking persimmons and they go out grocery shopping. Will they be able to do it without their dad? Sunghoon's match is finished and Sunghoon and Sarang go to Busan where Sunghoon learned judo more than 10 years ago! They take funny pictures and visit Sunghoon's old judo studio.

== 2016 ==
No.	Title	Original release date	Rating
111	"Every Wish Come True"	3 January 2016	13.8%
The twins go to a bathhouse to welcome the new year! The dance performance heats up the sauna and the twins break into the stage! The triplets try grocery shopping. Daehan leads his brothers, Minguk checks the sketchbook and Manse holds the heavy bags! It's the day of Seola and Sua's picnic and Donggook tries making rice rolls for the first time in his life. But then he suddenly starts cutting seaweed and pasting it onto children's faces. Sunghoon has a lot of memories in Busan before Sarang was born so they travel to Busan. They visit Sunghoon's old dorm, a famous market and Sunghoon's favorite restaurant!
112	"Kids Are Like Clay"	10 January 2016	14.6%
Seola, Sua and Daebak were scared by a laughing puppy doll. So Donggook takes them to a theme park of dogs. It has snowed a lot and Seojun wishes for something after looking at the snow. It's to meet Elsa of "Frozen!" And the real Elsa appears in front of the twins! It's the second morning at the Buddhist temple and the twins try picking cotton for the first time. Sunghoon and Sarang dress up in hanbok and make a wish at Yongungsa, Busan. They also meet Uncle Donghyun and have delicious dinner. Guest stars: Kim Sook
113	"I'll Watch Over and Protect You"	17 January 2016	14.1%
Sunghoon has cut his hair short and has transformed into a movie actor! Sarang visits the movie set with her dad. The triplets have mastered the tricycle. Now they try riding bicycles. Will they be able to master bicycles as well? Donggook tries making egg soup for 2-year-old Daebak. But it's too hard for Donggook who's just a beginner in cooking. The twins have come to watch a performance! They have important tasks to do here!
114	"This is Dad's First Time Too"	24 January 2016	15.7%
It's Rohui and Taeyoung's first time spending two days without mom. Will they be able to survive their first 48 hours alone? Daebak can now eat regular food starting with the egg soup Donggook made last time. This time, they all go out to have beef soup. It's a peaceful day at the twins' house and they suddenly spot an unknown animal with sharp teeth, scary eyes and long tail through the window! Seoeon and Seojun head out to see what this mysterious animal is! Sunghoon has become an actor and Shiho and Sarang visit the movie set to support him! They open up a cafe and serve the production crew with delicious drinks! Meanwhile, the triplets go on a trip to a ski resort! Their ski skills have improved greatly compared to last time! Guest stars: Gamblerz
115	"Don't Worry, Dad"	31 January 2016	14.4%
Hwijae plans for a surprise get-together with other dads! He uploads this plan on his SNS page and waits excitement! The triplets have come to the restaurant to fill their stomachs after sledding. As soon as they enter, Minguk spots steamed buns! But Minguk cries after seeing his dad order. It's Taeyoung and Rohui's first 48 hours without mom and they got to a baby fair! Sarang is interested in swimming and Sunghoon takes her to a swimming class! Sua and Daebak attack the kitchen while Donggook is in his room. Sua finds a bag of sugar and starts tasting it. And even Seola joins them!
116	"I Love You, I Love You, I Love You"	7 February 2016	10.4%
Donggook gets a breakdown for "The Supermen are for hire" special! The five siblings living over the sky-blue walls are waiting for him! Donggook becomes the Superman for Sumin who wants to be a soccer player, and his little siblings. Triplet boys and another twin boys? Seoeon and Seojun visits Daebangdong where five boys are living! Hayeong's dad works overseas Sunghoon becomes the Superman for Hayeong's family! He goes to Hayeong's kindergarten and even becomes a P.E. teacher! It's the 10th wedding anniversary for Donggook and Taeyoung becomes the Superman for Seola, Sua and Daebak! What will happen at Rohui, Seola, Sua, and Daebak's first encounter? The triplets try making eel with rice for their mom working overtime. They take the lunchbox to their mom and look back on the past year. It's the last episode for the triplets! Guest stars: Lee Keun-ho
117	"Thank You For Coming to Me"	14 February 2016	13.7%
We introduce the new family! Actor Lee Bumsoo has come back as an ordinary dad! Soyul takes care of her baby brother just like a mom and Daeul always tries to stay next to his sister. It's our first encounter with them! Seoeon and Seojun have been desperately waiting to meet Elsa that they met last time. They clean Elsa's shoes with devotion. Then they suddenly run off to somewhere! Sarang and Yuto are born and raised in the city. They visit the countryside of Korea where the air's fresh and the water's clean. Sunghoon asks them a favor to cook the delicious chicken dish. Taeyoung wants to have a lot of babies and he experiences the situation with Donggook's children. He was very confident at first but he gets exhausted as time goes by. Guest stars: Yoon Jung-soo, Kim Sook, Song Eun-i, Park So-hyun
118	"Fly Little Chick"	21 February 2016	12.5%
From climbing to escaping a maze! The twins have a sports match! But things get overheated and the twins get mad at each other. Hwijae steps in to help them make up with each other. Sarang and Yuto get eggs from a neighborhood lady and they fall asleep, feeling excited to see chicks born. Bumsoo tries to make fried rice for Soeul and Daeul but it takes him forever to make it. Eventually, Soeul falls asleep. Taeyoung is done feeding the four children and he take Rohui into the room to put her to sleep. But then, Daebak starts pulling out tissue rolls. The five siblings have visited the ski resort. Daebak falls in love with the snow and Seola and Sua try sledding!
119	"Good to be Different, Good to be Similar"	28 February 2016	11.8%
Soeul and Daeul prepare a birthday gift for their mom! Soeul carefully draws her mom's face but Daeul uses all colors, drawing an abstract piece! The twins want to be funny! The twins and Hwijae try everything but Rohui doesn't smile. Will they be able to succeed in making Rohui laugh? Sarang and Yuto visit a traditional market! Everything seems so new and amazing to Sarang. They visit Namiseom and reenact a scene from a famous Korean drama! Seola, Sua and Daebak are very much into reading these days so Donggook takes them to a bookstore. But their attention is only on toys and they keep creating trouble!
120	"It's Okay, It'll All Work Out"	6 March 2016	10.4%
Hwijae prepares another surprise get-together for dads! He uploads the notice to his SNS page one day before the event. Kwanghee has come to become a one-day Korean teacher for Sarang! Sarang and Shiho have a fierce Korean match! SoDa siblings are at an amusement park with their dad. They dress up as a princess and a prince! Taeyoung and Eugene test Rohui's love by calling Rohui and seeing to whom she comes. Rohui starts crawling powerfully! The twin girls and Daebak have come to sauna with Donggook. They have fun at the swimming pool and all of a sudden Daebak's interest falls into a girl she meets there.
121	"Always Spring"	13 March 2016	10.2%
The twins love fishing so Hwijae prepares a big water tank and a big rubber tub for the twins play with flour. How will this end? Sunghoon and Sarang have a special date! They've come to a photo studio to leave a couple photo in a dress and tuxedo. Daeul becomes a real man when he's in kindergarten! He wants to go to class with older children, he eats vegetables and washes himself. Taeyoung invited two of staffs babies to help Rohui make friends. Will he be able to take care of three babies alone? Daebak tastes cheesecake for the first time and he experiences a whole new world.
122	"I Love You and Remember You"	20 March 2016	11.5 %
While Hwijae goes to take a shower, his phone starts ringing! The shocked twins answer the phone and their mom asks them to do some chores. It's the last episode for Sarang! Sarang and the family have prepared an event for the viewers! SoDa Siblings go on an adventure to find a mineral spring. Bumsoo reminisces about his childhood and goes to find the mineral spring. Rohui visits Eugene's drama set to cheer her up! There she meets her dad's doppelganger Lee Sangwoo. Before going abroad for training Donggook takes the kids to a snow crab restaurant. The savory and delicious snow crab meat captivates the three siblings!
123	"Family is My Strength"	27 March 2016	13.1%
The king of variety shows, Lee Gyeonggyu visits the twins! He gets knocked out by the cute twins. While dad was gone, Daebak developed a talent! Donggook excitedly goes home after watching Daebak greeting his sisters, but Daebak ignores him. Two cute little friends visit the SoDa Siblings! It's two dogs of their neighbor Taecyeon, Eddie and Hari. Rohui goes to Guam with her parents! Everyone gets shocked at how Eugene looks in her old baby photo. She looks exactly the same as Rohui. Guest stars: Lee Kyung-kyu, Ok Taecyeon from 2PM
124	"I Prepared This For You"	3 April 2016	11.4%
Hwijae has prepared a big event for the funny twins! He even invited the producer of "2 Days and 1 Night," Yu Hojin. But thanks to active Seojun, it's hard just to start the show. Taeyoung and Rohui have a great time on their own. Taeyoung tries to have a romantic lunch at a beach restaurant when Rohui starts moving to try new food! Daeul's friend Epe has grown big! Daeul is scared of getting injections so Bumsoo asked Epe for help. Will Daeul be able to get the injection? Daebak visits a barber shop to become a manly man. For some reason, Daebak looks sad from the beginning. Guest stars: Lee Kyung-kyu, Yu Ho-jin director from 2 Days & 1 Night
125	"Two Is Better Than One"	10 April 2016	10.8%
Sua, Seola and Daebak visit the stadium to cheer for Donggook. They prepare a surprise event with their grandpa! Seoeon and Seojun play the dinner game of chance, the symbol of "2 Days and 1 Night!" And they are awaken by the beautiful morning angel. Who is she? SoDa Siblings travel back in time to Bumsoo's school days. Taeyoung prepares a surprise event for Eugene and Rohui. It's like a scene from the movies. Guest star(s): Yura
126	"Take a Break from Child Rearing: Part One"	17 April 2016	10.9%
A handsome actor is here to take care of the five children of Donggook. The sisters are shy but Daebak seems to be nervous. A big rabbit is running around Seoeon and Seojun's house. He was expecting a big welcome but the twins ignore him. Two idol uncles appear in front of SoDa Siblings as their mom and dad. The two uncles can't help but surrender to the untiring siblings. Singer uncles have visited to see cute Rohui. They take care of Rohui just as they learned from Taeyoung. And they go out to take the subway for an outing. Guest stars: Kim Jun Hyun, Song So-hee, Kwanghee, Hyung Sik, Jung Yong Hwa, Lee Jong Hyun, Lee Dong Wook
127	"Take a Break from Child Rearing: Part Two"	24 April 2016	10.6%
All the Superman children have to go through this place! It's the village school where the triplets cried their hearts out. SoDa Siblings get scared the look of the school master but Seojun starts falling asleep. Yonghwa and Jonghyun prepare a serenade for Rohui. They changes the lyrics and even records the song. There's a new family! It's Mr. Hiphop, Yang Dongkeun and his family. Joy is his 6-month old daughter who looks exactly like her father. How will these two get along?
128	"My Child's Operation Manual"	1 May 2016	10.2%
"199 seconds Stand-by!" Hwijae has prepared a special event to build teamwork between the twins. Donggook has brought his three children to a kid's gym! He wants to teach Daebak new sports other than soccer. Bumsoo has prepared a surprise event for Daeul. He transforms into Epe and tries talking to him. Last time, Taeyoung invited staff's children to help Rohui make new friends. He invites them again and has an infant development test. A usual day for Dongkeun and Joy! Joy has a bite of banana for the first time in her life and expresses her joy through King Kong dancing and dancing to the hip-hop music.
129	"Dads Need Dads Too"	8 May 2016	10.9%
It's the Parents' Day and the twins prepare a news show to give their grandpa an unforgettable present. The five siblings prepare a surprise birthday party for Donggook. They make the cake and seaweed soup themselves. Daebak has visited Daeul's house to spend some quality time. They share panties to become big boys and have fun at the Bumsoo playground. It's the new family! It's the charismatic actor Oh Ji-ho and his daughter Seoheun with a pretty smile and lush hair.
130	"Raising Them As Our Child"	15 May 2016	12.5%
Seoeon and Seojun just love toys. So Hwijae has prepared a special event! It's to spend the time on an island where there are no toys! Donggook takes his twin girls and Daebak to a counseling center to figure out their personalities. To test Daebak's problem-solving ability, he's told to take out the banana inside multiple boxes. SoDa Siblings try farm-staying according to Bumsoo's philosophy. They visit a traditional market in Chungju to prepare crops for farming. Everything seems so new and interesting to the city kids. The joint- parenting project! Jiho, Dongkeun and Gyojin have come together! How do they react at their first encounter?
131	"Raising a Small Child to be Big"	22 May 2016	11.3%
The three friends' joint-parenting starts now! They couldn't go out when they were alone but now they can! The three dads go on a little outing together and show off their talents! A pretty princess has visited Daebak! The manly man Daebak has become a cute little boy in front of her! The twins get a traffic safety training. Will they be able to cross the crosswalk that Hwijae has prepared for them? The SoDa Siblings have now begun farming! Soeul is so skilled at planting that she even tells her dad tips. It's a sunny day and Rohui and Taeyoung are out to take first birthday photos. And Rohui's first birthday party is revealed!
132	"Joint Babysitting Project, Babysitting is Fun"	29 May 2016	11.0%
It's Seoeon and Seojun's third first pitch with Hwijae who loves baseball. They've grown over the past year and Seojun tries batting and Seoeon tries throwing the ball first time. Seola and Sua are given a mission! Protect Daebak! A stranger approaches them at the playground and says he wants to take Daebak away while giving them lollipops. SoDa Siblings travel to Jeju-do with their dad! They try walking the 4th Olle Trail, which is known to be pretty difficult. Taeyoung participates in a quiz contest regarding childcare! Since he's skilled in childcare, he's very confident. It's the three dads' joint babysitting. The three dads are hungry and they become conscious of who's going to make dinner. Then they play a game of chance.
133	"Dads Dashing Through Time"	5 June 2016	10.1%
Seoeon and Seojun are at the farm! After listening to SoDa Sibling's message, they dig the ground and find treasure! What is the treasure? Seola, Sua and Daebak have dressed up in Hanbok and try learning pansori, Korean traditional singing. The peace at the three dads' house is gone! A trivial difference in opinion has brought a big chaos! SoDa Sibling are in Jeju-do. They follow the guest house owner to see female divers catch seafood. Rohui and Taeyoung are at the zoo! Rohui imitates the cute animals and Taeyoung can't help but smile looking at Rohui.
134	"How to Make the Day Special"	12 June 2016	11.0%
Seoeon and Seojun meet older friends at a countryside elementary school! Seoeon is busy playing with older girls and Seojun is busy talking with the boys. It's the highlight of Jeju! SoDa Siblings have arrived at Udo! And a secret guest is here to surprise them! Donggook is always in his sweats and he has come to a fashion outlet to become a fashionista! Taeyoung wants to make a lunchbox for Eugene and Rohui helps him crush tofu! The three dads try making headbands to give the three daughters a makeover!
135	"Dad School"	19 June 2016	10.8%
The naughty boys of the show Seoeon and Seojun! And the charming twin girls Seola and Sua! They meet once again! Also, Hwijae has stolen the heart of Daebak! and Donggook gets weary of the situation. Bumsoo and Daeul have a father-and-son date! They go to the car wash and dress up in suits! For Gyojin, the other two dads visit the drama reading room as a surprise! Everyone gets surprised at the visit of cute baby girls. Special appearance(s): Kang Ye-won
136	"Friends Grow Alike"	26 June 2016	9.9%
To keep the mango tree from Jeju warm, SoDa Siblings have visited an animal farm to get wool! They try shaving themselves and try horse-riding. But what interests Daeul the most seems to be dung! Seoeon and Seojun try going to their friend's house by themselves! They head out with just a piece of paper with address on it on their hands and they face many obstacles... Rohui's boyfriend is here! It's Tori with a great smile! Donggook and his children went on a vacation to take a break from the busy schedule. Donggook gets surprised at what Seola brings while he's resting. The three dads present a shocking oral narration of "Little Mermaid." The three babies start crying after seeing Gyojin dressed up as a mermaid.
137	"My Child Has a Secret, Too"	3 July 2016	11.1%
Soeul and Daeul learn how to plant rice seedlings with their dad and Seojun and Seoeon's day at the kindergarten is witnessed for the first time by their dad. Taeyoung sets off on a train trip for Rohee and Seola, Sua and Sian have a surprise guest who can't wait to see with them again.
138	"Strong and Fearless"	10 July 2016	11.3%
In this episode, Seoeon, Seojun and Hwijae go camping in a forest. They get to meet new friends and learn to get help from others. Donggeun performs together with Joy at Beenzino's concert. Bumsoo teaches Soeul and Daeul to be wary of strangers when they're alone.
139	"Can You Hear My Heart?"	17 July 2016	12.3%
Soeul and Daeul takes the subway for the first time to run an errand. A guest who Seoeon and Seojun like visits the twins' house. Sua, Seola and Sian make a mess in the house with rice this time. Rohee spends quality time with her dad at a gym. Guest star(s): Jung Sung-yun and Mo-ah, Yoon Hyung-bin and Jun
140	"Parenting Is Not Graceful"	24 July 2016	10.9%
Guest star(s): Lee Jung-jin
141	"Fondly Together"	31 July 2016	10.8%
Hwijae has been struggling daily with the unruly twins, and he decides to tame the twins by turning himself into a doll. The twins also get to meet a new friend, Nayul. Soeul and Daeul visit their farm in Chungju where they planted apple mango trees with their dad. To celebrate the twin sisters' birthday, Sian and Donggook prepare a surprise birthday party, as well as their long-awaited gift.
142	"Who Is Your Father?"	7 August 2016	10.5%
Soeul and Daeul prepare to star in the musical, Cats, with the help of their dad. Seoeon and Seojun visit their dad's workplace and they fall in love with Twice. Seola, Sua and Sian go on an expedition to cheer for Jaea's tennis tournament and O.G.G goes to watch "National Singing Competition".
143	"Operation Parenting"	14 August 2016	9.7%
144	"Six Children"	21 August 2016	11.4%
Soeul and Daeul harvest their crop and head to the market to sell them but Bumsoo and Soeul dispute over the pricing. Hwijae, Taeyoung and Donggook take their six children to watch Donggook's game. Afterwards, they head to a swimming pool to shake off the summer heat and Sua brings Uncle Taeyoung to tears when dealing with a talking bunny.
145	"Courage Brings Happiness"	28 August 2016	11.0%
Soeul and Daeul visit a magical school that teaches them how to be brave. Hwijae tries to teach the twins how to help and protect their neighbors by assigning them a mission. Rohee and Moa get their hair done by Taeyoung. Sua, Seola and Sian get a difficult task from their dad.
146	"What Is Precious Is Near You"	4 September 2016	9.9%
Bumsoo gets dressed up and goes to KBS with Soeul and Daeul to be on the news. The five brothers and sisters go on the subway by themselves to meet with their dad, Donggook, at the airport. Donggeun, Jiho and Gyojin come up with an elaborate plan to surprise Donggeun's father on his birthday.
147	"Grow Up Just Like This"	11 September 2016	10.1%
Soeul and Daeul make songpyeon to celebrate Chuseok and they deliver them to those close to their hearts. Seoeon and Seojun go to a recording studio with their dad to record his debut song, "Say Goodbye" in an updated version and are joined by a Hallyu star. Sua, Seola and Sian go to a seaside very special to their dad and they learn valuable life lessons there.
148	"You Are My Star"	18 September 2016	9.8%
Soeul and Daeul visit KBS to see their special guests today. These guests prepare them special events and gifts to make the siblings' day even more wonderful. Seoeon and Seojun visit their closest and prettiest friend, Arin, to celebrate her birthday. Sua, Seola and Sian visit Pohang to see their grandparents on Chuseok. Guest stars: Chen and Xiumin From EXO
149	"As You Wish, As You Say"	25 September 2016	9.6%
Seoeon and Seojun go to a park to find the Lonely Tree to which they came two years ago with Dad. Soeul and Daeul experience virtual earthquake to practice getting to safety and prepare themselves for real emergencies. Meanwhile, Sian's family is visited by a fashion model Lee Hyunyi, who is a mother to a baby that looks just like Sian.
150	"You Don't Have To Be Perfect"	2 October 2016	9.6%
Soeul and Daeul go fishing for anchovies where they meet a big fish they have never seen before. Seoeon and Seojun meet with two uncles who will teach them the dance routine for their new song. Donggook takes a peek at his children's daycare center life. A professional gamer who has recently become a dad visits Taeyoung's house to get a useful tip on childcare.
151	"Dad Who Teaches How To Catch Fish"	9 October 2016	9.4%
Soeul and Daeul get a chance to stay on a deserted island for a few hours with Bumsoo. They spend their quality time on the island and experience new things. Seoeon and Seojun learn how to write their names for the first time in their lives and they also learn how to button up their shirts. Donggook teaches Seola, Sua and Sian how to dance and act. Also, he teaches Seola and Sua why they should not bite their nails.
152	"People Who Changed Me"	16 October 2016	11.0%
Seoeon and Seojun meet pet raccoons who are just as playful as they are. As the twins try to tame them, the adorable raccoons seem unstoppable. Donggook's five children meet Olympic gold medallist fencer Park Sang-young. Baby Rohee gets tested for her cognitive and language development, and the test results shock Taeyoung.
153	"Happiness To People Who Give Us Joy"	23 October 2016	10.2%
Seoeon, Seojun and their friend Seunghun go to a movie theater for the first time in their lives. They enjoy watching a movie and empathize with the movie characters. Donggeun, Jiho and Gyojin play with Sian, Seola and Sua and they have a wild party together. Soeul and Daeul help their father prepare a party for the village elders.
154	"Everyday Becomes an Adventure"	30 October 2016	10.4%
In this episode, Seoeon and Seojun go on a special mission. Hwijae tells them to pick his laundry at the laundromat, and for a reward, they can order any pizza they like. Soeul and Daeul visit an animal farm and learn how to take care of the animals. Sian, Seola and Sua get a chance to be on a popular drama The Gentleman of Wolgyesu Tailor Shop.
155	"The Law of 20,000 Hours"	6 November 2016	10.4%
The families of The Return of Superman celebrate the third anniversary of the program by playing games and sports together at a school field. Choo Sarang and the triplets, Daehan, Minguk, Manse, come back to surprise the children, who are happy to see them again. The dads, Hwijae, Sunghoon, Donggook and Taeyoung, participate in a relay race as well for friendly competition.
156	"Love Builds as Much as You Love"	13 November 2016	11.4%
The members continue to celebrate the third anniversary of The Return of Superman. The kids hold a talent show to show off their skills and talents, they take strolls around the village and have fun. Also, previous members of the show send greeting to the viewers, and Ilkook presents stories of the triplet with the recordings he had made.
157	"A Child's Step Doesn't Stop"	20 November 2016	10.8%
Sunghoon and Sarang visit her dear friends, Soeul and Daeul. They learn the importance of money by selling their old clothes and toys at a flea market. Seoeon and Seojun experience many new things and spend great time in Jeju Island. Also, Rohee goes on a camping trip with her dad and his friends for the first time. Guest star(s): Moon Se-yoon, Si-yeon & Jin-hyeok
158	"Who Plays Better?"	27 November 2016	9.9%
Sian, Sua and Seola plays the role of a fairy tale story. Keunho's boat gets stuck in the ocean while on a race with the twins. Sarang and Yuto competes with each other doing activities such as racing, hanging onto the pull up bar, and also the pushing game. Soeul enters a singing competition for the first time in her life.
159	"That Year the Winter Was Warm"	4 December 2016	10.7%
Sam Hammington feels that he is not qualified to be a dad yet, and he decides to call Ki Taeyoung for a help. Donggook's wife asks him to make kimchi with the children. Hwijae, Seoeon and Seojun learn how to open their hearts to new friends in Jeju Island.
160	"Cheer Up, Dad"	11 December 2016	12.0%
Hwijae's wife and his twins show up at his work place with a pleasant surprise. Sian, Seola and Sua are spending quality time with their dad riding bicycles and visiting places. Soeul and Daeul goes to meet different actresses to give them a gift along with their dad. Choo Sunghoon and Yano Shiho takes cooking lessons together.
161	"A Dad Is a Child's First Teacher"	18 December 2016	10.9%
As Donggook returns home to his children with a winning medal, the five children prepare a surprise party for him. Hwijae asks Seoeon and Seojun to run an errand, but they cannot resist the temptation to visit a stationery store. Taeyoung visits the Hammingtons with Rohee and helps Sam feed William baby food for the first time.
162	"The Christmas Miracle"	25 December 2016	10.6%
Bumsoo shows Soeul and Daeul what community service is about. Donggeun, Jiho and Gyojin plan a first birthday party for Joy, Haeun and Seoheun. Seoeon and Seojun get excited after seeing Santa Claus. Guest stars: Seolhyun and Hyejeong (AOA), Seo Kang-joon and Kang Tae-oh (5urprise)

== 2017 ==
No.	Title	Original release date	Rating (ABG / TNmS)
163	"The Present Is A Present"	1 January 2017	11.3% / 10.4%
Ko Jiyong of Sechs Kies spends 48 hours alone with his son, Seungjae for the first time. Donggook's family travels to Chuncheon to eat some delicious dakgalbi and watch the first sunrise of 2017. As Lee Hwijae wishes to have a third child, he visits a urology clinic to check up on his health. Soeul and Daeul take the subway by themselves to find Dad, who is waiting for them at a campsite. Guest stars: Seo Kang-joon and Kang Tae-oh From 5urprise
164	"You Can't Have a Rainbow Without Rain"	8 January 2017	11.2% / 9.5%
Donggook visit a lake to see the first sunrise of the year with Seola, Sua, and Sian. Always full of energy, Seungjae exhausts Jiyong out with his dance moves. Another twin visit Seoeon and Seojun to tell them about their experience growing up as twins. The day of the finals has arrived, but Soeul is not in her best condition to sing. How will she do in the finals of the singing competition?
165	"The Moments Shine Brighter When We are Together"	15 January 2017	10.5% / 9.9%
Donggook decides to make lemon syrup and grapefruit syrup to protect the kids from getting cold. Seoeon and Seojun go and buy meat for dinner themselves. Rohee prepares snacks to welcome her new friends at her place. Soeul and Daeul prepare Christmas gifts for everyone who is involved in The Return of Superman.
166	"A Crisis Turns into an Opportunity"	22 January 2017	10.9% / 9.6%
Seoeon and Seojun learn an important lesson of not letting in a stranger into the house even if they claim to be a friend of their parents'. Soeul and Daeul head to Gangwon Province to learn how hwangtae is made. Donggook's family and relatives gather for a family reunion to celebrate the New Year and to enjoy delicious seafood.
167	"As Much Love That's Spread in the World"	29 January 2017	9.7% / 8.3%
The Return of Superman families celebrate the Lunar New Year by doing special things in different places. Seola, Sooa, and Sian pay a surprise visit to their sisters training in Thailand. Seoeon and Seojun decide to help the homeless people by selling magazines on the street. Seungjae and his dad plan a surprise event for his mom, and Soeul and Daeul take a bath in a hot spring and make a wish upon the Moon.
168	"Dad is the Best Playground"	5 February 2017	12.3% / 10.1%
Since Seoeon and Seojun are spending too much time playing with toys, worried Hwijae decides to teach them a lesson. Seungjae and Jiyong learn how to communicate with each other by having dinner together at a restaurant. Donggook takes all of his kids to Thailand to let them experience as much as they can while they are still young.
169	"Remember, and Look Forward"	12 February 2017	11.1% / 9.2%
Hwijae asks Seoeon and Seojun to run an errand for him, but the twins get sidetracked. Seola, Sooa, and Sian's travel around Thailand continues, and they finally visit the place they've been eagerly waiting for; a zoo. Seungjae visits a mart to buy ingredients for a delicious meal and also goes to a photo studio to take his first ID photo. Soeul and Daeul go trout fishing to Pyeongchang, but they get worried about their dad trying to catch trouts in icy water.
170	"I Support Your Beginning"	19 February 2017	12.0% / 9.9%
Hwijae takes Seoeon and Seojun to visit a family that they have not seen for a long time. He takes all seven kids to a children's gym and do many fun activities with them. Seola, Sooa, and the rest of the siblings except for Sian take turns in parasailing. Surprisingly, everyone enjoys the fun activity without any fear. Soeul and Daeul visit a ski resort and learn how to ski. Sam takes William for his first swimming session. Meanwhile, Jiyong takes Seungjae for counselling to see if Jiyong can do things differently to become a better Dad.
171	"I Have Grown up with You"	26 February 2017	11.4% / 8.0%
For Daeul's birthday, his dad pays him a surprise visit to his kindergarten in a costume. While playing at a playground, Seoeon and Seojun find a dollar bill and try to find its owner by visiting the bank and the police station. Jiyong takes Seungjae to the dental clinic for the first time. He is absolutely terrified of the dental instruments at the clinic and resists getting treated.
172	"Will You Be My Friend?"	5 March 2017	10.4% / 8.4%
Daeul and Soeul's family move to a new house near their grandmother's place, so that their grandmother can see them more often. Seoeon and Seojun become friends with two octopuses. Sooa, Seola, and Sian visit William's place for a day, and a special guest joins them as well. Guest stars: Sam Okyere
173	"A Day like a Present"	12 March 2017	9.4% / 7.2%
Seoeon and Seojun visit a hair salon to trim their hair on their own while Hwijae prepares a surprise gift for them. Seola, Sooa, and Sian go strawberry picking and also visit a center to get their agility tested. Seungjae takes a tour around Daehangno with Jiyong, enjoying things that he has never experienced before. Bumsoo, Soeul and Daeul take up wushu as an indoor sport to practice.
174	"One Kind Word"	19 March 2017	11.6% / 9.3%
Seoeon and Seojun get ready to leave their old house. They give out letters of gratitude to their neighbors and hold a give-away event. Seola, Sooa, and Sian are invited to a wedding, and they sing a song for the bride and groom. Seungjae visits Jiyong's old friend for a meal. Soeul and Daeul visit a hospital to get their blood tested.
175	"Love Comes Back"	26 March 2017	11.5% / 9.7%
Seoeon and Seojun try to familiarize themselves in the new neighborhood. As they are disappointed that there are no fun places to visit, Hwijae dresses up as Pikachu to make them feel better. Rohui and her dad visit Insa-dong and try various Korean traditional snacks. Daeul and Soeul take the bus to go to their old neighborhood and say hello to their old neighbors.
176	"The Hero of Daily Life"	2 April 2017	9.5% / 8.0%
Seoeon and Seojun finally move into their new home. Now they have to sleep in their own room by themselves. Seola, Sooa, and Sian visit countryside, and Donggook catches a chicken to cook for the kids. Seungjae goes to a comic book café with his dad, and Soeul and Daeul visit a deserted island to camp out for a night.
177	"I'll Do Anything for You"	9 April 2017	9.3% / 7.8%
It's Seoeon and Seojun's birthday, and Seojun prepares a surprise gift for Seoeon. Rohui also celebrates her birthday by throwing a party and recording her first album with Bada. Donggook takes Seola, Sua, and Sian to a special place to learn how to sing. Seungjae goes hiking with Jiyong, and Soeul and Daeul spend their last night on a deserted island. Guest stars: Bada
178	"I Hope My Love Will Reach You"	16 April 2017	9.5% / 8.2%
William and Sam visit a friend who also has an infant son named Noah. Seoeon and Seojun are visited by their favorite friends including a pair of raccoons. Two months ago, they had met the raccoons when they were small, but now they have grown so big that the twins call them boars. Soeul and Daeul go to the zoo at an amusement park where Bumsoo rides the roller coaster by himself.
179	"You Are My Flower"	23 April 2017	9.1% / 8.4%
Seoeon and Seojun travel to Odong Island in Yeosu with Hwijae to see the beautiful ocean. They are given new missions to find Hwijae on their own. Seungjae and Jiyong fly to Jeju Island to meet forest friends. Rohui also goes on a trip with Taeyoung to see the ocean.
180	"Dad's Effort Makes a Child Blossom"	30 April 2017	7.9% / 7.9%
Seoeon and Seojun try zip-line ride for the first time with Hwijae. Sam takes pictures of William and his pets, Gaji and Mandu, to enter a look-alike contest. Jiyong and Seungjae's trip in Jeju Island continues. SHINee Minho invites Seola, Sua, and Sian to SM Entertainment's office building. Soeul and Daeul prepare special gifts for Bumsoo. Guest stars: Choi Min-ho of SHINee
181	"If I Can Love More Than I Can Express"	7 May 2017	9.1% / 7.6%
Donggook disguises himself as an elderly man and appears in front of Seola, Sua, and Sian. Taeyoung and Rohui open a cafe to make money and buy Eugene a gift for Parents' Day. Sam and William travel to Busan together. Jiyong and Seungjae spend a sweet time together wearing matching outfits.
182	"What's Important is All Around Us"	14 May 2017	9.5% / 6.2%
Seoeon and Seojun secretly prepare a meal for Hwijae. Sam and William visit Busan's Sajik Stadium to watch a baseball game. Donggook and Sian enjoy time together, while Seola and Sua spend time together separately. Seungjae and Jiyong spend a meaningful time together at the zoo.
183	"A Good Day To Love"	21 May 2017	8.1% / 8.4%
Seungjae and Rohui spend the day together. Seungjae shows his brotherly affection as he treats Rohui like his own sister. Seojun spends the day together with his kindergarten crush, Bona. Seola, Sua, and Sian head to Jeonju together with Donggook. The three siblings visit a grandmother's house that they visited the last time they were at Jeonju.
184	"You're The Most Difficult Person"	28 May 2017	9.5% / 8.6%
Seoeon, Seojun, and Hwijae attempt to live without a smartphone. Donggook spends a busy morning preparing the three siblings for kindergarten. Seungjae enjoys having the house to himself while Jiyong steps outside of the house briefly. Sam and William visit Professor Robert Kelly's home in Busan to spend time with his family.
185	"Kids Grow Up Playing"	4 June 2017	9.1% / 6.9%
The three siblings and Donggook go on their first camping trip and make unforgettable memories. Seoeon and Seojun visit actor Lee Gyein's home with Hwijae. Jiyong and Seungjae spend a fun time together at Itaewon.
186	"Saying Goodbye to Things That We're Familiar With"	11 June 2017	8.9% / 7.9%
Jiyong prepares a special day for Seungjae who has lately been misbehaving and going through infantile puberty. To show Seola, Sua, and Sian how to be brave, Donggook dives into a tank full of sharks. Yijun and William spend the day together.
187	"You Will Know Too Once You Leave"	18 June 2017	10.0% / 8.4%
Seungjae and Jiyong spend a special day together at Gangwon Province. Jiyong tries to help Seungjae get rid of his fear of water. Seoeon and Seojun travel to Vietnam with Hwijae to visit their aunt. Taeyoung and Rohui spend a fun time together at the park.
188	"The Best Gift of My Life"	25 June 2017	10.6% / 8.4%
Sam visits the hospital with Willam and his wife Yumi, who is pregnant with their second child. Seola, Sua, Sian, and Donggook spend a fun time together at Busan. Continuing their trip at the countryside, Jiyong and Seungjae spend a meaningful time with Grandma Hosun. Seoeon, Seojun, and Hwijae continue their trip in Vietnam and visit an island known for its many monkeys.
189	"There's Nothing to Fear When We're Together"	2 July 2017	11.0% / 9.7%
Taeyoung and Rohui sell old baby products that Rohui used when she was a baby. Sam and William prepare a surprise event for Actor Ryu Suyoung. Seungjae visits a pharmacy to buy medicine for Jiyong. Sian spends time at an amusement park with his sisters and Donggook. Guest stars: Ryu Su-young, Lee Yoo-ri, Lee Joon
190	"I'll Protect You"	9 July 2017	9.1% / 9.2%
Seola and Sua invites Minha, a boy they like from kindergarten, to play at their house. Meanwhile Seungjae gets banned from sweets and attempts to buy some with fake money and gets busted. The twins, Seoeon and Seojun, go to the mountain and take care of three little goats who lost their mother.
191	"I Will Help You Walk With Glory"	16 July 2017	10.0% / 8.4%
A new family joins the show. Outsider, who is famous for his fast rapping skills, makes a special appearance with his lovely daughter Rowoon. Meanwhile, Donggook and Sian prepare a surprise event for Seola and Sua's birthday.
192	"I Will Be Your Umbrella"	23 July 2017	9.8% / 9.4%
Seungjae prepares a surprise for Jiyong's birthday with his mom. Sam prepares a special event for William's birthday. Seoeon and Seojun spend the day with CNBLUE's Jung Yonghwa at their house. Guest stars: Jung Yong-hwa of CNBLUE
193	"Very Warm Moments"	30 July 2017	8.8% / 8.7%
Taeyoung and Rohui prepare an event for the couple's 6th anniversary and take a summer trip to a river with Eugene. Gyojin's family welcomes visitors while Gyojin gets to have pregnancy experience to understand Ehyun better. Jiyong and Seungjae's zone-out stay takes an unexpected turn. And Seojun and Seoeon learn about sportsmanship by competing with each other at the sports class.
194	"I'm a Star"	6 August 2017	8.5% / 8.3%
Hwijae takes Seoeon and Seojun to World Insect Fair as well as Folk Village to have a good time. Donggook's children spend a day with star uncles while Donggook is out for work. William's grandmother comes to visit Sam's family from Australia, and goes on a Seoul tour with them. Seungjae learns how to be a big brother by playing with his little cousin. Guest stars: Kang Daniel, Ong Seong-wu, Park Ji-hoon, and Yoon Ji-sung From Wanna One
195	"A Midsummer Night's Honey"	13 August 2017	9.0% / 9.2%
Jiyong and Seungjae visit Jiyong's elementary school together. Sam and William spend a special day with William's grandmother who is visiting for William's first birthday. Hwijae takes the twins to a special library. Seola, Sua, and Sian spend the day with Wanna One members. Guest stars: Kang Daniel, Ong Seong-wu, Park Ji-hoon, and Yoon Ji-sung From Wanna One
196	"The Gift of Coincidence"	20 August 2017	10.8% / 9.0%
Jiyong and Seungjae go on an impromptu trip together with strangers to Yangyang County. They spend a fun time with the other travelers. A special guest visits Sam and William's home. Hollywood star Steven Yeun visits to spend the day with William. Donggook, Seola, Sua, and Sian spend the day taking care of their neighbor's dog. Guest stars: Steven Yeun
197	"A Great New Discovery in Everyday Routine"	27 August 2017	10.1% / 9.0%
Jaesi, Jaea, Sua, Seola, and Sian prepare a special day for their dad who is leaving for the national soccer team training. Hwijae takes the twins to a blood donating center. While their dad is busy donating blood, Seojun and Seoeon spend a fun time together. Singer Kim Jongmin visits Seungjae's house to spend the day as Seungjae's uncle. Guest stars: Kim Jongmin
198	"A Day Like No Other"	3 September 2017	8.5% / 8.2%
Sam and Willam visit a character festival together. At the festival, they meet famous actors who are also visiting the festival. For the "Uncle Special", Seoeon and Seojun spend the day with Junjin and Kangnam. Seola, Sua, and Sian spend time on a deserted island with their dad. Guest stars: Kangnam and Jun Jin, Kim Jongmin and Cha Tae-hyun (via phone call), Steven Yeun and Mads Mikkelsen
199	"We Are Not Alone"	10 September 2017	10.1% / 8.7%
Seola, Sua, Sian, and Donggook go on an adventure on a raft. They enjoy the last bit of summer in the water together as they play games and eat delicious watermelon. Meanwhile, Hwijae comes up with a special plan to stop Seojun and Seoeon from fighting. He separates them and tries to teach them the importance of brotherhood.
200	"A Father is His Child's Dream"	1 October 2017^{3}	8.1% / 7.0%
Sian and Donggook visit the public bathhouse together. They spend an unforgettable day together at the bathhouse as they scrub each other's backs, play jokes, and have fun together. Meanwhile, William visits the hair salon with Sam for the first time ever to cut his long hair. Afterwards, they spend time together in Itaewon. Taeyoung and Rohui go on a trip together on a special train. Rohui explores the unique train that even has a foot spa and makes sweet memories with her dad. Guest stars: Lim Seul-ong, Mihal Ashminov
201	"Wisdom Grows Like a Ripening Grain"	8 October 2017	7.8% / 7.0%
All the families gather together for the Chuseok Holiday Special. The families gather at a traditional village school and spend the day together. The children learn about manners, and the fathers prepare special presents for the village elders.
202	"Our Sweet Relationship"	15 October 2017	11.4% / 10.0%
Donggook and Sian spend the day delivering steamed rice cakes to their new neighbors. Sam and William visit a cafe made for kids with their friends. While Sam spends time with his foreigner friends that he met in Korea, William has fun with their kids.
203	"Bringing Warmth to One Another"	22 October 2017	9.1% / 8.7%
Ki Taeyoung and Rohui visit the hair salon to change up Rohui's hairstyle. He tries his best to learn how to do different hairstyles for Rohui. Seoeon and Seojun spend time delivering rice cakes to people they are thankful for, and Victor and Jane spend time together at the ice rink. Guest stars: Jung Yong-hwa of CNBLUE, Cha Hong, Bada
204	"We Need Secrets of Our Own"	29 October 2017	9.2% / 9.6%
To celebrate Seungjae's birthday, Jiyong prepares presents for Seungjae and plans a unique event for his wife who is also celebrating four years of being a mother. Victor and Jane visit the Red Square in Moscow to spend a special time together. Sam and William spend a fun day with the child actor Lee Rowoon. Guest stars: Jang Seung-jo, Seo Hye-jin, Hyuna, Geum Bo-ra, Park Si-eun, Kim Chae-woon
205	"Love is the Warmest Temperature"	5 November 2017	10.3% / 10.3%
To celebrate The Return of Superman's fourth anniversary, a special bazaar is planned. The families spend a meaningful time as they prepare for it. Also for this episode, Choo Sunghoon and Choo Sarang's family makes a special appearance. Guest stars: Choo Sunghoon, Choo Sarang, So Yoo-jin, Seo Jang-hoon, Kim Saeng-min, Lee Dong-wook, Heo Kyung-hwan, GFriend, Sunmi, Tiger JK and Yoon Mi-rae
206	"My Little Hero"	12 November 2017	9.6% / 9.2%
To celebrate the show's fourth anniversary, all the families gather and spend a fun time playing together. Super Market finally opens, and the families take time to get to know each other even more. Guest stars: Robert Kelly, Marion Kelly, James Kelly
207	"My First Ever"	31 December 2017^{4}	6.3% / 6.7%
Sian goes for training with Donggook for his very first kick-off event while the sisters cheer for him enthusiastically. At the temple stay, Jiyong is surprised once again how well Seungjae adapts to the new environment. Meanwhile, Sam prepares something special for the baby-to-be-born. Guest stars: Jeonbuk Hyundai Motors FC members (including past members such as Kim Nam-il and Eduardo Gonçalves de Oliveira), Tiger JK, Bizzy, Yoon Mi-rae

== 2018 ==
No.	Title	Original release date	Rating (ABG / TNmS)
208	"We'd Choose Ourselves Again in Another Life"	7 January 2018	10.5% / 10.3%
Donggook has a quality time with the three children by going to a restaurant in his memory as well as making a promotional video for Pyeongchang Olympics. Meanwhile, Sam stays in a maternity ward with his wife, Yumi, and William for the delivery of his second child. You get to see the special story of them including the tough yet beautiful process of childbirth and welcoming the new member of their family with moving tears.
209	"I'm Glad to Have You"	14 January 2018	9.7% / 9.6%
Donggook prepares a special fourth birthday for Sian who is transformed into a superhero. Sam and William visit the famous fastidious star, Jiwoong's house and finds a new generous side of him as an uncle. Meanwhile, Jiyong is surprised by how brave and confident Seungjae is in front of a crowd as well as in the nature. Guest star: Heo Ji-woong
210	"For You, Who Always Shine"	21 January 2018	9.5% / 9.6%
Donggook has a special and awkward day with his father and Sian while wearing matching outfits. Sam takes a business trip to Japan and meets Sayuri to ask for babysitting as well as interviewing his idol. Meanwhile, as a farewell, Taeyoung's family opens Ki Cafe to repay the love they have received so far. Guest stars: Heo Kyung-hwan (via phone call), Sayuri Fujita, Mark Hamill, Choi Hyeon-ho and Ji-woon and Ah-young, Hong Kyung-min and Ra-won, Jung Sung-yun and Mo-ah
211	"I Cheer on Your Courage"	28 January 2018	10.4% / 8.8%
Donggook and the five siblings become runway models of a charity fashion show and experience the chaos of a backstage. Sam uses his wits to help William who gets exhausted while enjoying the food tour in Japan. Meanwhile, Jiyong finds enlightenment of raising a child through Seungjae's creativity test. Guest stars: Lie Sang-bong, Han Hyun-min, Kahi, Hong Seok-cheon (brief appearance)
212	"Raising Them is Never Easy"	4 February 2018	12.5% / 8.6%
Hwijae and the twin become the cameos in Jinyoung's music video and the twin fall in love with tteokbokki and Jinyoung. Sam visits the neighbor, Jury, and practices being a father of two boys. Meanwhile, Jiyong disguises himself as a grandmother to find out Seungjae's honest feelings about him. Guest stars: Hong Jin-young, Hong Won-ki (director), Jeong Ju-ri
213	"That Makes a Family"	18 February 2018^{5}	11.3% / 9.4%
To celebrate the new year, Hwijae and the twins meet with the people close to Hwijae and exchange heartwarming greetings. Jiyong visits Yeonnam-dong with Seungjae and has an eventful day. Donggook, his parents, and his children visit the graveyard of Donggook's grandmother and savor the love of their family. Sam takes care of the two sons by himself for the first time and realizes the hardships and the joy of raising the children. Guest stars: Kim Hyun-chul and Bom-bom, Kim In-seok and Taeyang, Im Ha-ryong
214	"We're Coming to Meet You"	25 February 2018	8.2% / 8.6%
Donggook and the three kids collect the items they do not use and head to the junkyard. After they are back at home and Donggook goes out, the kids cause an unexpected trouble. Sam hears a shocking news about William's teeth growth when William and Bentley get different checkups at the clinic. Meanwhile, for Seungjae, who likes dinosaurs, Jiyong takes him to a special group meeting. Guest stars: Jo Se-ho (via video call), Boom (via video call)
215	"I'll Be on Your Side"	4 March 2018	10.% / 10.0%
For Jiyong, who is busy at work, Donggook invites Seungjae over for a play date with Sian. Sam and Sam Okyere organize a 100-day photo shoot of Bentley. Meanwhile, Hyunbin spends the day with his cousin, Yoonji, and her lovely daughter Lani and reminisces the memories of the past. Guest stars: Sam Okyere, Lee Yoon-ji and Ra-ni
216	"Living, Loving and Learning"	11 March 2018	8.9% / 8.5%
Donggook's children are separated from their dad and spend the vacation in Bangkok while learning in an international school. Sian tries to adjust in his own way, to the new environment where he can't communicate with his own language. Sam gathers with three of his friends who also have kids and spend a good time. Meanwhile, Hwijae and the twins get down to cleaning the house for the spring. Guest stars: Akiba Rie and Yena, Christina Confalonieri, Eva Popiel and Noah
217	"The Road to You"	18 March 2018	9.6% / 9.1%
Jiyong and Seungjae take a trip by train to Samcheok just the two of them. William's family gets ready to take off to Australia to meet Grandma. And Sam and Wiliam visit Dongdaemun Market and have a good time while picking up gifts for their family. Meanwhile, Donggook's children take fright at the unexpected "guest".
218	"Traveling and Discovering New Things"	25 March 2018	9.3% / 7.6%
Jiyong takes Seungjae whose dream is to become a firefighter to the fire station after preparing gifts and a letter. Donggook's children visit Sian's new friend, Boise's home and spend a wonderful day with Boise's dad. Meanwhile, Sam's family finally reunites with the grandmother in Australia.
219	"Like a Lie, Like a Gift"	1 April 2018	8.4% / 7.3%
Seungjae has an internship experience for a day at Jiyong's company and becomes a tonic for the employees while helping Daddy. As Grandma spends a quality time with Bentley, William and Sam visit a safari in Australia. Meanwhile, Sian faces his biggest rival at the birthday party of Minchae, whom he likes.
220	"In Retrospect, Every Moment was Touching"	8 April 2018	8.4% / 8.4%
Seungjae spends a great day with the fun Uncle Hyuksoo instead of Jiyong. Willam's family visits Uncle Paul and have a meaningful time while exchanging gifts and sharing good food. Meanwhile, Seoeon and Seojun's family make their farewells as they look back at the past memories. Guest star(s): Kwon Hyuk-soo
221	"It's Always Spring When Love Abounds"	15 April 2018	7.6% / 7.3%
Donggook gives it the first try at Zumba Dance with the children. Seungjae and Jiyong spend the day near the ocean and Jiyong loses his wallet. Sam goes on the last tour in Australia with his family and has a deep and meaningful conversation with his mother. Meanwhile, the actor Bong Taegyu's family newly joins the show.
222	"The Whole World Is Your Flower"	22 April 2018	9.3% / 8.8%
Dong-gook and Si-an take a stylish stroll around a hip neighborhood in Seoul. The Ko duo are guests on a live radio show and attempt to plan a surprise. The Hammingtons have a play date with Boom's nephew. Tae-gyu and Si-ha have a photoshoot session with some friends. Guest star(s): Choi Soo-jong, Boom and Si-won, Lee Yoon-ji and Ra-ni, Kim Na-young and Shin-woon
223	"You Make Me Happy"	29 April 2018	7.2% / 7.6%
Seung-jae babysits a pig. The Lee family stays at a guesthouse at Hanok Village and the siblings get separated. The Hammingtons have a playdate with Ricky Kim's family. Si-ha meets some friends at the park and overcomes one of his fears. Guest star(s): Ricky Kim and Tae-oh and Tae-ra
224	"Dreaming Children and Fulfilling Fathers"	6 May 2018	7.0% / 6.6%
It's Children's Day, and the fathers have prepared special things for the kids. Ji-yong takes Seung-jae to the zoo. The Lee siblings get singing and dancing lessons, and the 5 siblings perform on stage. William gets a surprise from his favorite animal. Moon Sung-min takes on the 48 hour challenge. Guest star(s): Lee Seok-hoon (SG Wannabe), Super Junior (Leeteuk, Shindong, Eunhyuk) (brief appearance), TVXQ, Moon Sung-min and Si-ho and Li-ho
225	"Happy Incidents Occur Every Day"	13 May 2018	7.1% / 7.5%
Tae-gyu and Si-ha take the subway to visit a flea market. Chaos ensues in the Lee household as the 5 siblings plan a birthday surprise for Dong-gook. William and Bentley hand out popcorn around the KBS studio and Sam films a show. There's love in the air as Seung-jae attends a birthday party for Alice. Sung-min finishes his 48 hour challenge with the kids. Guest star(s): Eric Nam, Kim Se-jeong
226	"I Like You For Who You Are"	20 May 2018	7.2% / 7.2%
Ji-yong watches the Lee siblings, and Seung-jae and Si-an have a sleep over. Si-ha and Lani have a play date and visit a dry sauna. The Hammingtons watch a basketball game, and William shoots the ball. Guest star(s): Lee Yoon-ji and Ra-ni, Kang Byung-hyun and Park Ga-won and Yoo-jun and Yoo-ha
227	"Which Star Are You From?"	27 May 2018	8.0% / 6.5%
The Lee siblings has a singer uncle over to watch them. Seung-jae takes care of his hurt dad. Bentley grows up right before our eyes, and Sam learns to cook. Jo Jung-chi and Eun-Yi take on the 48 hour challenge. Guest star(s): Hwang Chi-yeul, Jang Jin-woo and Man-ok
228	"Looking at the World Through Your Eyes"	3 June 2018	7.6% / 8.0%
Jung-chi and Eun-Yi go on a hike and make music. They also have visitors over as they finish their 48 hours. The Ko duo commutes to Gwanghwamun. The Hammingtons visit Byung-jae, and together they go to YG studio. Guest star(s): Yoo Byung-jae, Sandara Park, Jeong Tae-ho and Seo-yul and Si-woo
229	"A Small Adventure for a Happy Day"	10 June 2018	7.2% / 8.6%
Si-ha attends daycare, and Tae-gyu goes in a disguise. Plus, Si-ha's cousins come over. The Lee siblings go indoor rock climbing. The Hammingtons visit a countryside village and help out at a farm. Swung-jae meets a famous uncle from Taiwan. Plus, Seung-jae finally heads to Dokdo Island making a pit-stop at Ulleungdo. Guest star(s): Jasper Liu
230	"The World Is a School"	17 June 2018	7.7% / 8.5%
Si-ha visits his grandparents. The Hammingtons become superheroes and visit Song Kyung-ah's house. The Ko duo continues their trip and finally touchdown in Dokdo Island. Guest star(s): Song Kyung-ah and Hae-yi
231	"Explore, Dream and Discover"	24 June 2018	8.6% / 8.9%
The Lee siblings visit a mudflat and attempt to catch fish for their meal. The Hammingtons visit a mall and a waterpark. The Ko duo argues as they arrive in Taiwan. Kang Hyung-wook and Ju-woon take on the 48 hour challenge. Dong-gook takes the kids to Gauido Island. Guest star(s): Kang Hyung-wook and Ju-won, Eva Popiel and Noah
232	"Small but Definite Happiness"	1 July 2018	8.8% / 9.9%
Si-ha spends his second day at his grandmother's and attempts to catch crayfish. The Hammingtons go on a hike. The Ko duo spends their first full day in Taiwan, and Seung-jae meets up with Uncle Jasper. On their second day, Hyung-wook and Ju-woon visit a lake, and AOA members pay him a visit with their dog, Mochi. Guest star(s): Jasper Liu, AOA (Seolhyun and Mina)
233	"The Moment You Mature into a Father"	8 July 2018	8.0% / 8.1%
Si-ha takes a trip to visit Tae-gyu's father's grave. Ji-yong and Seung-jae spend their last day in Taiwan. Dong-gook and the kids continued their trip in Gauido Island. William gets a visit from Laa-Laa from the Teletubbies for his birthday.
234	"A Surreal Day"	15 July 2018	7.7% / 8.1%
Ji-yong is gifted freedom for his birthday and Seung-jae's mom looks after house. Si-ha meets the Lee siblings in Jeonju, and Tae-gyu struggles as he babysits all four kids. The Hammingtons take a trip to Singapore.
235	"Because You're So Precious"	22 July 2018	8.2% / 10.4%
Seol-ah and Soo-ah turn six and get a birthday party. It is day 2 in Singapore for the Hammingtons and they visit an island. Yang Joon-mu takes on the 48 hour challenge with No-ah as Kahi prepared to give birth to their second son. Seung-jae and his friends get together to say goodbye to Alice. Guest star(s): Kim Kyung-hwa, Choi Ja-hye, Esther (SOHODAE), Jeon Hye-bin, Shiho Yano, Choo Sunghoon
236	"Waiting for Rainbows"	29 July 2018	8.4% / 9.4%
The Lee siblings visit a Frozen exhibit. The Hammington sibling's grandmother pays them a visit on their third day in Singapore to treat Sam to a special birthday celebration. Kahi has scary complications as she gives birth.
237	"Today is Always a Special Day"	5 August 2018	8.6% / 9.2%
Victor and Jane meet up with the Bong duo and play on the beach. Seung-jae sings the national anthem at a baseball game. Bentley reached another milestone, and William joins Sam at work. Dong-gook take the kids on a steam locomotive train ride and stroll around Gekseong. Guest star(s): Viktor Ahn and Jane, Noh Soo-kwang, Sam Okyere
238	"Summer Be Good to Me"	12 August 2018	9.1% / 8.4%
Si-ha expresses his true feelings to a shrunken Tae-gyu. The Ko duo take a summer trip to Busan, but of course not without arguing. The Lee siblings do some drill training at a creek with the help of Dong-gook's coworker. The Hammingtons visit an indoor amusement park and have a playdate with Si-ho and Li-ho. Guest star(s): Moon Sung-min and Si-ho and Li-ho, Lee Yong
239	"There is No Flower Prettier Than You"	19 August 2018	10.5% / 10.8%
Sam schemes up a way to wean William off of his favorite blanket, then they meet some animals. The Lee siblings go on a wilderness camping trip. We meet Na-eun and Geon-hoo as they join the show with their dad, Park Joo-ho. The Ko duo spends their last night in Busan.
240	"You Don't Have to Be in a Hurry!"	26 August 2018	12.0% / 12.0%
Tae-gyu goes undercover at Si-ha's school to teach the students about safety. The Ko family takes a trip to Mexico. Na-eun and Geon-hoo accompanies their dad as he seeks treatment for his injury. The Hammingtons move to a new house.
241	"I'm Lucky to Have Met You"	2 September 2018	9.8% / 10.5%
Si-ha and Jane go to a salon… and a clinic. Seung-jae sings a song at wedding in Mexico. William has a date with So-yi. The Park family takes a tour of Ulsan. Guest star(s): Viktor Ahn and Jane, Kim Jun and So-yi
242	"The Time We Walk Together"	9 September 2018	9.6%
The Ko duo visits one of the seven wonders of the world, go on a pirate ship, and ride zip lines in Mexico. William and Bentley hang out with idol aunties. The Park family and the Lee family meet for the first time, and Park Joo-ho watches all 5 kids. Guest star(s): WJSN (Dayoung, Yeonjung, Bona)
243	"I Support Your First Tries"	16 September 2018	9.4%
Si-an attempts to conquer his fear of heights again then meets a strange friend. William gets his nails done, and Bentley walks . Joo-ho takes the kids on a train ride to visit their grandparents. The Bong duo plan a special surprise for Woonji as she goes back to work.
244	"May Everyday Be Like Today"	23 September 2018	5.6%
Si-an learns his father's sport, and the Lee siblings learn how too vlog. The Park family prepares for Geon-hoo's birthday. William and Bentley visit a King's home. The Ko family swims with whale sharks in Mexico.
245	"Your Day Will be Sunny All Day"	30 September 2018	9.1%
The Lee siblings go on a spontaneous road trip. The Bong couple finally take their dream honeymoon to Hawaii but with two kids in hand. Geon-hoo turns one, and Na-eun goes to a salon. William attempt potty training.
246	"I Miss You Even When You're With Me"	7 October 2018	8.3%
Ji-yong tries to end Seung-jae's obsession with dinosaurs. Si-ha meets dolphins in Hawaii. The Park family takes a tour around a village. Sam has been invited to an award show and the kids tag along. Si-ha and Tae-gyu continue their trip Hawaii. Guest star(s): Jun Hyun-moo, Choi Soo-young, Jasper Liu, Kyung Soo-jin, Chae Jung-an, Yutaka Matsushige, Red Velvet, Oh Ji-ho, Sung Si-kyung, Ryohei Otani, Daniel Lindemann
247	"You're Always There During Happy Times"	14 October 2018	8.5%
The Lee trio takes their car for a wash. William has a gummy bear friend, and they visit a market and try new foods. Na-eun goes to kindergarten, and Joo-ho visits to teach them soccer. Seung-jae makes snow globes to sell to buy his mom a birthday present.
248	"Changing Together Like Autumn Leaves"	21 October 2018	8.5%
The Ko duo go on a hike and cross a suspension bridge. Si-ha sees a real dinosaur in Hawaii. William keeps playing inside the toilet, so Sam has a plan to make him stop. Na-eun opens up a salon in her house, and her two clients get drastic makeovers. Plus, Joo-ho goes back to playing soccer. Guest star(s): Lee Yong, Kim Min-jae, Han Seung-gyu, Hwang Hee-chan, Lee Seung-woo, Hwang In-beom, Paulo Bento
249	"From Mount Halla to Mount Paektu"	28 October 2018	11.8%
It's the 5 year anniversary special, and all the kids split into 2 teams. The Hammington, Bong, and Park family head to Jeju Island, and Sarang joins them. The Ko duo and Si-an with Minho in Dong-gook's place head to China, and See-eon and Seo-jun joins them. Guest star(s): Minho (Shinee), Lee Hwi-jae & Lee Seo-eon & Lee Seo-jun, Choo Sung-hoon & Choo Sa-rang
250	"From Mount Halla to Mount Paektu Part 2"	4 November 2018	9.4%
The kids continue on their tours. Team Jeju take a tour of an island on a tandem bike and race go-carts. Team Mount Paektu travel some more and being their climb. Guest star(s): Minho (Shinee), Lee Hwi-jae & Lee Seo-eon & Lee Seo-jun, Choo Sung-hoon & Choo Sa-rang
251	"From Mount Halla to Mount Paektu Part 3"	11 November 2018	10.9%
The Mount Paektu group finally reaches the summit and get a great view of Heaven Lake. The Jeju group visit an animal sanctuary. The children share the same message: please take care of our earth. Guest star(s): Minho (Shinee), Lee Hwi-jae & Lee Seo-eon & Lee Seo-jun, Choo Sung-hoon & Choo Sa-rang
252	"One Step at a Time Into the World"	18 November 2018	9.4%
The Lee family go on bike rides and stuff their faces at a buffet. Na-eun kicks the first ball at her dad's soccer game. William tries learn table manners and meet up with a friend. Jo Sung-mo and Bong-yeon take on the 48 hour challenge with the Bong's help. Guest star(s): Jo Sung-mo and Bong-yeon, Richard Windbichler
253	"The Reason Why Life is Worth Living"	25 November 2018	10.1%
Seung-jae goes to a cabbage farm to help make kimchi. Sam tries to make William eat vegetables to cure his constipation and eventually visits a clinic. Na-eun makes a breakfast feast in her living room then has dinner with her dad's international friends. Si-an has a party for his 5th birthday and sees his strange friend again. Guest star(s): Richard Windbichler, Sergio Escudero, Lee Myung-jae
254	"I'll Go to You Like Winter's First Snow"	2 December 2018	10.8%
Si-ha and Bong-yeon compete in their own olympics. Seung-jae wishes for a different dad, so Ji-yong makes it so, but he learns what he lacks with his son. Sam and William prepare for Bentley's first birthday party. Na-eun learns taekwondo and instantly makes friends. Guest star(s): Jo Sung-mo and Bong-yeon, Son Ho-young (g.o.d), Eva Popiel and Noah, Sam Okyere, Jeong Ju-ri and Do-yun, Ryu Soo-young
255	"You're the Center of My Universe"	9 December 2018	11.2%
Ji-yong gets a checkup, and Seung-jae visits a dentist. Na-eun goes on a shopping spree at a market then invited some friends over. Sam comes up with a plan to help William expand his vocabulary. Key visits the Lee family and help Dong-gook stay youthful. Guest star(s): Key (Shinee)
256	"A Winter Fairytale"	16 December 2018	10.9%
Tae-gyu prepares a special gift for Si-ha but it backfires. Na-eun and Guen-hoo go over to the Hammington's house and prep for Christmas. The Lee family fosters a puppy. Guest star(s): Lee Hye-jung, Kim Ji-min
257	"The Miracle of December"	23 December 2018	10.1%
Seung-jae joins an outdoor kindergarten class. Na-eun and Geun-hoo have idol uncles watch them for the day, and they raise money for charity. The Hammingtons shop for tree decorations. Si-ha and Ra-ni have another play date. Guest star(s): Kai (EXO), Chanyeol (EXO), Lee Yoon-ji and Ra-ni
258	"End or And"	30 December 2018	10.2%
The Lee siblings get evaluated by a behavior specialist. The Park family visit a nature cafe, and Joo-ho plays a prank. The Hammingtons get invited to a wedding. The Ko duo watch the first sunrise of the year. Guest star(s): Lee Si-eon, Yoon Hyun-min, Nam Bo-ra, Park Hwi-sun, Lee Seung-yoon, Park Ji-sun, Oh Na-mi, Shin Bo-ra, Nam Hee-suk, Yoo Min-sang, Lee Hyun-yi and Yoon-seo

== 2019 ==
No.	Title	Original release date	Rating (ABG)
259	"Every Moment Was for You"	6 January 2019	10.8%
The families get ready for the KBS Entertainment Awards ceremony and the dads prepare a surprise to farewell Bong Tae-gyu and Si-ha. Guest star(s): Naeun (Apink); Special appearance(s): Twice; Andy Lee (Shinhwa); DIA; Do Kyung-hwan; Hwasa (Mamamoo); Lee Hwi-jae; Jun Hyun-moo
260	"I Can Hear Your Heart"	13 January 2019	10.7%
Ji-yong tries to slow down his rushed life but Seung-jae and him meet the hulk instead. An idol uncle goes all the way to Ulsan to take care of the Park kids and take them to a dentist. Sam teaches the kids how to fish. Guest star(s): Kim Dong-hyun; Hwang Kwanghee; Special appearance(s): Choo Sung-hoon
261	"Our Winter Story"	20 January 2019	11.7%
The Lee family does winter sports training with the Ko duo. Sam tries to get William to cherish his old toys, then they visit a greenhouse. The Park family visit Busan. Guest star(s): Ahn Yoon-sang
262	"I Learned Love from You"	27 January 2019	11.6%
Ki Yom, the puppy, finds a new home and has to leave the Lee family. Plus, they go to Thailand to visit the older sisters. William is obsessed with chocolates and watching tv. The Park family continues their trip in Busan, and Na-sun has a traumatic experience.
263	"Everyday is an Existence"	3 February 2019	10.9%
The Lee family meets elephants and watch a dinner show in Thailand. Na-eun attends a Korean traditional school to learn Korean etiquette. The Hammingtons visit a public bath.
264	"A Superhero Just for You"	10 February 2019	11.3%
The Ko duo meets up with the Shim family. Geon-hoo talks to Na-eun and discuss their differences. William meets superheroes including spider-man, his favorite. Guest star(s): Shim Ji-ho, Yi-el and Yi-an; MC Dingdong
265	"A Noisy But Happy Day"	17 February 2019	10.7%
The Lee family runs into a bit of trouble in Thailand. Jo-hoo suddenly becomes a father of three daughters. A famous grandfather meets with the Hammingtons. Guest star(s): Lee Deok-hwa
266	"I Will Share My Warmth with You"	24 February 2019	10.7%
Jo Sung-mo is back and holds a concert and Bong-yeon joins him. William learns to fly. Na-eun learns to bake with the help of a famous chef. Guest star(s): Jo Sung-mo and Bong-yeon; Mihal Ashminov and Adrian; Han Hyun-min
267	"A Magical Day"	3 March 2019	10.7%
The Lee siblings, Seung-jae, and Na-eun get invited to wizarding school to learn magic. The Hammingtons have comedian guests come over. Bong-yeon visits his sick grandfather in a very emotional and touching reunion. Guest star(s): Lee Eun-gyeol; Kim Jun-ho; Hong In-gyu and Chae-yoon; Jo Sung-mo and Bong-yeon
268	"The Loving People"	10 March 2019	11.7%
William gets his own phone. Geun-ho moves into his own house, and the Park family visits Busan. Jang Beom-june's family join the cast.
269	"I Think I Love You"	17 March 2019	12.7%
The Jang family survive their first night and make music together. The Shim family join the Ko duo on an educational and exhilarating trip. A colourful uncle plays with William and Bentley. It's the day of Na-eun's baking contest. Guest star(s): Shim Ji-ho, Yi-el and Yi-an; Jo Bin (Norazo); Special appearance(s): Kim Won-hyo
270	"I Want to Take It Slow With You"	24 March 2019	11.9%
Dong-gook becomes a captain and so does Si-an. The Ko duo visit the Park family in Ulsan. Bentley and William have to get vaccinated. The Jang family visit an amusement park.
271	"A Bright Day With You"	31 March 2019	12.4%
The Jang family paint at an art cafe, and then move over to his studio. Bentley sees what it's like to be an older brother, and he and William pick strawberries. Uncle Kwang-hee has another fun day planned for the Park siblings. Guest star(s): Petri Kalliola and Mikko; Hwang Kwang-hee
272	"You're Blooming Next to Me"	7 April 2019	11.2%
Seung-jae and Yi-an become skilled warriors. The Lee siblings are actors in a new drama. Willam and Bentley meet some uncles, with a whole lot of swag and then visit a market. The Park family play outside and go through a maze. Guest star(s): Shim Ji-ho, Yi-an and Yi-el; Choi Min-ho; Kim Dong-wan; Bastarz (P.O, B-Bomb and U-Kwon)
273	"The Most Beautiful Thoughts Are for You"	14 April 2019	12.3%
The Jang siblings have their grandmother and great-grandmother over. Ra-won comes back to the show; this time with a baby sister. The Park family gets a trampoline and take a stroll along some flowers. Sam tries to make William stop picking his nose, and Bentley gets his hair cut for the first time. Guest star(s): Hong Kyung-min, Ra-won and Ra-im
274	"My Heart is Filled with You"	21 April 2019	11.2%
Ha-da has to get vaccinated, and the Jang family have a photo shoot. Seung-jae and Ra-won run errands together. The Hammingtons visit a kids cafe as William begins potty training. Geon-ho relieves his built up stress, and Na-eun learns about the Korean alphabet. Guest star(s): Hong Kyung-min, Ra-won and Ra-im
275	"The Memory of How We Had Fun"	28 April 2019	14.0%
Si-an learns the struggles of being the older sibling but proves to be more than capable. The Jang family take a trip through Beom-june's past. The Hammingtons visit a meat market and meet with a meat expert. The Park family have a picnic amongst the cherry blossoms and bamboo trees, and have a mini sports day. Guest star(s): Don Spike
276	"Do Whatever You Want to Do"	5 May 2019	10.9%
It's Children's Day, and Dong-gook prepares a surprise for the trio, and Si-an outsmarts one of his dad's pranks. The Hammingtons visit the countryside, and the elderly dote on the kids. Geon-ho finds pleasure in the little things, and the family plays in an indoor pool.
277	"A Lesson Into the Unfamiliar World"	12 May 2019	13.8%
Seung-jae takes the subway all on his own to visit Yi-an's house. The Jang family continue on their trip through the past, and Beom-june treats a whole restaurant. The Hammingtons ride a raft through a river and bury a time capsule. Na-eun's class holds a flea market, but Geon-ho finds it hard to part with his favorite toy. Guest star(s): Shim Ji-ho, Yi-an and Yi-el
278	"Never-ending Cherry Blossom"	19 May 2019	15.4%
The Jang family continue their trip and go busking in Yeosu as they say goodbye to the show. Kim takes on the Superman challenge with his 3 kids. They join the Ko duo in a sports day with other parents. William and Bentley play in personal bathtubs, but that doesn't work so they visit an indoor water park. The Park family revisit a kids cafe, and Na-eun gets a real gingerbread house.
279	"Today, We Sing Again"	26 May 2019	15.2%
Hong Ra-won is back and leads the family on a grocery run. William wishes for rain as they visit a garden. The Park family go camping, and Joo-ho tries to redeem himself. Na-eun proves that she can protect her brother. Guest star(s): Hong Kyung-min, Ra-won and Ra-im
280	"Will You Remember Me?"	2 June 2019	14.0%
Seung-jae hands out gifts to people he's thankful for as it is his last day on the show. Plus, he holds a counseling session. Si-an wants glasses to look like an idol, but his dad has other plans. William has to protect his new pet frog from Bentley. The Park siblings enroll in a kids gym class to help Geon-ho release all of his energy, and they get very cute visitors over.
281	"To You Who Taught Me Happiness"	9 June 2019	14.6%
The Park family visit a fishing village in Ulsan. Moon Hee-joon and Jam-Jam joins the show and spent their first day alone together at a community center. William now obsesses over zombies and turns himself into one.
282	"A Fairytale in Our Daily Life"	16 June 2019	15.0%
The Park siblings are in Switzerland, and a fun uncle joins them. Jam Jam makes a mess as she dabbles in skin care and plans a surprise event for her mom. Park Jung-Chul takes on the superman challenge with Da-in, who celebrates her birthday over and over again. Will and Ben get another sibling and meet up with Da-in. Guest star(s): Park Jung-chul and Da-in; Hwang Kwang-hee
283	"A Poem for the Little Things"	23 June 2019	15.2%
The Ra-Ra sisters are back, and Ra-won learns to cook and goes on a date. William has to protect his things from thief Ben, and Sam puts them through the patience test. Kwang-hee repeatedly struggles with watching the Park sibling in a foreign country. Guest star(s): Hwang Kwang-hee
284	"I'm Happy When You Smile"	30 June 2019	15.9%
The Lee siblings play a prank on their prankster dad since he doesn't seem to have the prankster touch anymore. Elsa visits Jam Jam, and they visit an amusement park. Kwang-hee takes the kids to a museum, and his energy can't keep up with the kids. The Hammingtons go to the beach via maglev train. Guest star(s): Hwang Kwang-hee
285	"The Sound of the Approaching Summer"	7 July 2019	15.8%
Jam Jam plants some trees, and Lee Seok-hoon visits them with his baby. Sam takes advantage of the kid's young age to get free passes for various activities. Na-eun becomes the German-speaking guide around Switzerland, plus another uncle visits them. Guest star(s): Lee Seok-hoon (SG Wannabe) and Joo-won; Hwang Kwang-hee; Koo Ja-cheol
286	"We Must Stay Together to Live"	14 July 2019	13.8%
The Lee siblings go on an overnight trip, and go treasure hunting, and the pranks don't stop. Ra-won makes plum juice and keeps her dad in check. She also start of her own cafe truck. Will and Ben ride scooters and go to a zoo. The Park siblings reunite with their dad. Guest star(s): None.
287	"You're My Flower"	21 July 2019	13.6%
Jam Jam learns to arrange her own flowers, and the twins, Seo-eon and Seo-jun make a special appearance. William celebrates his 3rd birthday, and he meets his best friend. Na-eun and Geun-hoo visit an indoor amusement park and the beach. Guest star(s) (in order of appearance): Moon Jeong-won, Lee Seo-eon, Lee Seo-jun and Lee Hwi-jae (via phone call); Joshua Carrott (Korean Englishman) and Gabie Kook
288	"Fly to Your World"	28 July 2019	15.1%
Tensions rise as Dong-gook's starts a kid's soccer league. Na-eun learns ballet and Geon-hoo tags along, but his energy is unmatched. Will and Ben recycle trash to earn money for a present for their mom's birthday, and meet up with a friend. Guest star(s): Lee Yong; Kim Na-young and Shin-woo; Special appearance(s): Choi Chul-soon and Jae-hee; Lee Hyo-jung and Bin; Ryu Seung-min and Seong-gong; Dan-woo and his sister (Moon So-ri's children); Park Ga-won and Yoo-joon (Kang Byung-hyun's son); Cho Dong-hwa and Jae-beom; Yoo Da-on (Yoo Won-sang's daughter); Chon Tae-poong (Tony Akins) and Tae-yong
289	"Memories of Summer"	4 August 2019	14.3%
Ra-won hikes a mountain with her dad to fetch mineral water along with her cousin. Jam Jam's dad walks down memory lane, and he preps for a concert. Will and Ben struggle to get along, so Sam comes up with a plan, plus he opens up a water park. The Park family visits Seoul. Guest star(s): None.
290	"The Story Dad Didn't Know About"	11 August 2019	14.7%
Jam Jam goes to the clinic to check that she's growing up well. Dong-gook's soccer team meet their match. The Park family visit a farm to pick their own ingredients for a special meal and look at birds. The Hammingtons visit a traditional market. Guest star(s): Lee Yong; Special appearance(s): Choi Chul-soon and Jae-hee; Lee Hyo-jung and Bin; Ryu Seung-min and Seong-gong; Dan-woo (Moon So-ri's son); Park Ga-won and Yoo-joon (Kang Byung-hyun's son); Cho Dong-hwa and Jae-beom; Chon Tae-poong (Tony Akins) and Tae-yong
291	"The Hottest Day of My Life"	18 August 2019	15.3%
The Park family visit a drawing studio cafe. The Hammingtons attend an award ceremony, and Sam wins an award. Do Kyung-wan chaperons Si-an, Na-eun and Gun-hoo for the day while their dads are preparing for the K-League All Stars Game. Guest star(s): Do Kyung-hwan; Special appearance(s): Shin Ye-eun, NU'EST, Norazo, Naeun (April), Kim Yeong-cheol, Hyeri (Girl's Day), Oh My Girl, Lee Yong, Jo Hyeon-woo
292	"To You Who Shines Today"	25 August 2019	15.1%
Dong-gook's soccer league goes on a retreat as they continue to train. Jam Jam cooks for her dad and goes for a train ride to the market. William gets a tutor. Geon-hoo gets a pet bird and visit a bird cafe. Guest star(s): Lee Yong, Seong-gong (Ryu Seung-min's son), Choi Chul-soon and Jae-hee, Park Ga-won and Yoo-joon (Kang Byeong-hyun's son), Moon So-ri and Dan-woo, Jung-jae (Na Sung-bum's son)
293	"Can You Translate How I Feel?"	1 September 2019	15.4%
Ra-won get evaluated, and her dad learns how she's growing up way too fast. Jam Jam recreated one of her parents' dates with her dad. Sam plays a prank on William, and he scores big at an auction house. The Park siblings released their energy plus go to a sauna. Guest star(s): None.
294	"It's Written as Failure, but Reads as Experience"	8 September 2019	16.0%
Dong-gook's soccer league goes through boot camp as they prepare for their best match yet. Ra-won helps her dad shop at a traditional market. The Park family goes on an overnight trip in Pohang. Before fall takes over, Will and Ben play in the water once more, and Will bravely learns a water sport. Guest star(s): Lee Yong, Seong-gong (Ryu Seung-min's son), Choi Chul-soon and Jae-hee, Park Ga-won and Yoo-joon (Kang Byeong-hyun's son), Moon So-ri and Dan-woo, Jung-jae (Na Sung-bum's son), Eva Popiel and No-ah
295 (Chuseok Special)	"Dear Moon, Our Love"	15 September 2019	14.5%
The families celebrate the Chuseok holiday. The Ra-Ra sisters visit their grandmother. Jam Jam hand makes treats to give out and send video message to their family and friends. The Park family continue their trip by taking strolls in the village. Will and Ben get a rare change to spend time with their grandfather. Guest star(s): None.
296	"Today Is Another Lovely Day"	22 September 2019	17.2%
The Hong family go on a road trip to a waterpark, but make a pitstop at a service area. Jam Jam's toy breaks and she takes it to the toy hospital. The Hammingtons get a care package from their grandmother in Australia, and Sam runs a kindergarten in the park. The Park family go shopping for plants, and Joo-ho plants an event for Na-eun. Plus, they continue their holiday trip. Guest star(s): Jeong Ju-ri, Do-yun, Do-won and Do-ha
297	"Walking Through Memories"	29 September 2019	14.5%
Si-an and Dong-gook go on a father and son backpacking trip, and Si-an's friends come to visit him in Jeju Island. The Hammingtons have fun in their lodge and visit a village to strengthen the brother's relationship but team up against Sam. Joo-ho prepares a strange breakfast for the kids. Geon-hoo gets his ID picture taken, and the rest of the family join in on the fun. Guest star(s):
298	"When I'm with You, I Can Do It"	6 October 2019	14.1%
All of the Lee siblings gather together for the last time on the show, and they say their goodbyes. The Park family opens up a restaurant, and Na-eun becomes the best waitress. William wishes to be Spiderman, so Spiderman's best friend pays him a visit. Guest star(s): Jacob Batalon
299	"Let's Walk Our Autumn"	13 October 2019	14.3%
Jam-Jam takes the marshmallow challenge and enrolls in gymnastics. The Hong sisters get their passports. The Hammingtons help feed some storks and overcome their fear of heights. Joo-ho films a cooking show, and they visit a dairy farm. Guest star(s):
300	"I Love You 300"	20 October 2019	13.9%
The show celebrates its 300th episode. Jam Jam goes glancing. The Hong trio take a trip all around Korea. The Park family start a band and resume their visit to the dairy farm. The Hammingtons visit a water park and a funny aunt who's an expert on food. Guest star(s): Lee Young-ja
301	"If Only There Were Practice In Childcare"	27 October 2019	14.5%
Ra-won gets her own big-girl bedroom, and Ra-Im grows quickly as well. Jam Jam make rice cakes and go on a date with her dad to see the city lights. Na-eun and Geon-ho open a makeup salon with their dad being the first customer. Bentley has to visit a hospital, and when all is well, the visit a park. Plus, they leave for Australia on a family trip. episode Guest star(s): Hwang Kwang-hee (via phone call)
302	"They Grow as Much as You Trust in Them"	3 November 2019	14.0%
Big girl Ra-won goes grocery shopping alone. Jam Jam meets with some idol uncles. William and Bentley provide the best medicine for their sick grandma in Australia, and the kids become the ghostbusters for Halloween. Geon-ho runs his first errand and plays well around the park that is to Na-eun. Guest star(s): Seventeen (Seungkwan, DK, Dino, Hoshi)
303	"The World is Beautiful When You Smile"	10 November 2019	12.7%
The show gets another year older, and the kids get together to make calendars for charity. Then they enter a giants house. meanwhile Geon-ho and Na-eun cheer on their dad at a soccer match. Guest star(s): Sean (Jinusean), Yeon Jung-hoon, Ha Seung-jin
304	"Finding Happiness by Chance"	17 November 2019	15.8%
Jam Jam runs her first solo errand while her family visits a recording studio. Will and Ben continue their Halloween trip in Australia, and they go for a train ride and meet some animals. Geon-ho learns to exercise, and their dad plans a sentimental picnic and visit a zoo. Guest star(s):
305	"A Little Village Called Memories"	24 November 2019	16.5%
Jam Jam hosts a tour with many of her dad's fans and their kids. Joo-ho regrettably sets up a bell service and they take a stroll on a bridge. The Hammingtons learn about their Australian side, and Bentley celebrates his birthday. Guest star(s):
306	"It's Okay Even When Winter is Here"	1 December 2019	15.8%
Jam Jam learns how to drive and gets her first car. Ra-won becomes shy with the visit of idol uncles, but becomes brave when getting vaccines. Clues are scattered around the Hammington house, and they go shopping. Joo-ho visits a salon with the kids, and head to Taiwan. Guest star(s): NU'EST (Ren, Hwang Min-hyun)
307	"The Time to Change the World"	8 December 2019	11.7%
Do Kyung-wan and his family return to the show. The Park family face many crises along with pleasantry as they continue their trip in Taiwan. The Hammingtons visit the countryside and pick tangerines. Guest star(s):
308	"The Miracle of an Ordinary Day"	15 December 2019	12.0%
The Do family get their pictures taken for Ha-Young's upcoming first birthday, but it wasn't easy. Plus, they embark on a camping trip with a friend. Sam teaches William a lesson for not listening to him. The Park family visit a street food market in Taiwan. Guest star(s): Kim Hwan
309	"The Long-Awaited Today"	22 December 2019	12.9%
Sam brings the kids to visit his friend in Dubai. Crayon Pop pays Jam Jam a visit. The Do trio visit their grandparents. The Park family continue their trip in Taiwan and get a Christmas surprise. Guest star(s): Crayon Pop (Geummi, Choa, Way)
310	"Hello and Goodbye"	29 December 2019	12.5%
Jam Jam gets a real life visit from her new favorite toy, but her desire for her idol and her dad to meet makes things complicated. Thankfully, a handsome uncle resolves the situation. The Hammingotns visit the desert in Dubai. The Park family visit an ostrich cafe, and Joo-ho announces that a third child is on the way. Yeon-woo plays the cello and composes a song to surprise their mom. Guest star(s): Lee Ji-hoon

== 2020 ==
No.	Title	Original release date	Rating (ABG)
311	"Even in the New Year, We're Pretty, Cute and Lovely"	5 January 2020	13.8%
It's already another year, and Ra-im is walking and talking now. Joo-ho shows the kids around his alma mater. The Hammingtons move over to the UAE capital, Abu Dhabi. The Do siblings get a tour of their dad's workplace. Guest star(s): Choi Dong-seok (announcer), Yangpa, Song Hae
312	"For All Supermen in the World"	12 January 2020	11.3%
It's the KBS end of the year awards, and the kids get together to claim their wins and meet famous aunts and uncles. Plus, Will and Ben meet Pengsoo. Guest star(s): Pengsoo, Jang Dong-yoon, Jung Il-woo Special appearance(s): Kim Jin-su, Moon Se-yoon, Son Dam-bi, Shin Dong-yeop
313	"Love Is Beautiful, Childrearing Is Wonderful"	19 January 2020	11.9%
Jam Jam feels bittersweet during her first day of daycare. The Park siblings wake up in Seoul then attend their dad's soccer game. Will and Ben's snow day with Pengsoo resumes. Yeon-woo runs his first errand on his own without the help of the cameramen uncles. Guest star(s): Pengsoo
314	"Together on Lunar New Year"	26 January 2020	11.3%
Jam Jam goes to a ski resort. The Park family reminisce about their time on the show as they plan for a hiatus. The Do family overcomes everything that goes wrong as they attend a wedding. Will and Ben attend a friends birthday party. Guest star(s): None.
315	"Our Love Lasts Forever"	2 February 2020	10.3%
Ra-won runs her own salon. Yeon-woo lends a voice to his dad. We meet a new superman who has a musically talented son with a large vocabulary.
316	"Playing with Daddy"	9 February 2020	11.8%
Jam Jam's curiosity peaks while her dad revives his generation as the family takes a trip to Singapore. Will and Ben go to the dentist. Yeon-woo has a date at a sauna. Guest star(s): None.
317	"A Great Day for A Random Getaway"	16 February 2020	10.2%
Jam Jam's Singapore tour continues. Music lover Ha-oh shops for a new instrument. Will and Ben play dress up to visit a friend and her strange and unfunny superman dad. The Do family take a meaningful trip to Busan. Guest star(s): Han Suk-joon and Sa-bin
318	"The Challenge Has Already Begun"	23 February 2020	12.8%
The Kang duo face a crisis while cooking, and Ha-oh visits a clinic. We meet a new son whose mom is eager to get a day off. Bentley has a sad parting with his pacifier, but Will helps him through it. The Do family's trip in Busan resumes. Guest star(s): Lee Sang-joon (Lee Mi-do's husband) and Do-hyung
319	"Hurray for the Fathers in Korea"	1 March 2020	14.3%
Jam Jam goes for a thrilling ride on her last day in Singapore. Kyung-min shows his daughters why he was an idol with his friend. Will and Ben make a gift for their grandmother, and Sam teaches them a lesson. The Do kids watch their mom at work. Guest star(s): Kim Won-jun and Ye-eun Special appearance(s): Wink, Kim Yang, Jo Jung-min, Kim Dong-gun
320	"I'll Go to You When the Weather Is Fine"	8 March 2020	13.2%
We get a peek into a new superman's bilingual house as Jam Jam visits them. Gary puts genius Ha-oh to the test. William wishes for spring, so Sam makes his wish come true. Yeon-woo learns the concept of working hard for money, and he doesn't disappoint. Guest star(s): Kim In-seok, Angela Park, Tae-yang and Tae-san Special appearance(s): Jo Se-ho (via phone call), Hwang Chi-yeul (via phone call)
321	"Victory to Superman"	15 March 2020	14.0%
A new soccer playing superman takes in the 48 hour challenge. Ha-oh overcomes his fears and they visit a gym. Will and Ben test their dad's patience. The Do family plan a surprise birthday party. Guest star(s): Kim Young-gwon, Li-a and Li-hyun
322	"Our Childrearing League"	22 March 2020	14.8%
Jam Jam helps out with laundry. Things become difficult in many ways in the Li household. Will and Ben, joined by a couple of friends, get manner lessons from the scary teacher. Tensions rise as Yeon-woo gets competitive again his guest. Guest star(s): Kim Young-gwon, Li-a and Li-hyun
323	"Meeting You Has Made My Life Fuller"	29 March 2020	14.6%
Kyung-min brings the Ra-Ra sisters to where he practices for the musical he stars in. Kyung-wan learns english by having a foreigner over. Ha-oh proves his intelligence once again. The Do family host a singing competition and the stakes are high. Will and Ben hang out with a cool older brother and guest on another show. Guest star(s): Stars' Top Recipe at Fun-Staurant cast (including Lee Kyung-kyu, Lee Young-ja, Lee Yoo-ri, Lee Seung-chul, Lee Jung-hyun and Kim Kang-hoon),Hong Rok-ki and Ru-an, Special appearance(s): Jeong Ga-eun, Kim Seung-hyun, Kim Hee-jin, Park Sung-yeon, Kim So-yoo, Jeong Da-kyung
324	"Childrearing Playbook"	5 April 2020	11.8%
A new superman celebrates his expecting wife. Ha-oh gets a haircut and learns to read. Williams new doll seems to have a life of its own. Yeon-woo gets a big surprise from his idol. Guest star(s): Na Tae-joo
325	"It's Spring by Chance"	12 April 2020	12.4%
Ha-oh and Jam Jam have a push and pull type play date. Ben struggles with being a younger brother, and Will visits his girlfriend's house. Since the Do siblings can't go to a kids cafe, the kids cafe goes to them. Guest star(s):
326	"My Universe Was Filled with You"	19 April 2020	11.0%
Se-mi's family faces a rollercoaster of emotions and the delivery of her new baby becomes complicated. Ha-oh's new favorite singer visits him. Will and Ben go to work at a farm. Kyung-wan gets a special staycation for his birthday. Guest star(s): Cho Myung-sub
327	"Superman Class"	26 April 2020	12.6%
Ha-young has a hidden talent, and a salon opens up at home to prep for a guest. Jam Jam's dad has to come with different ways to combat her rebelling age. There's a potato surplus in the Hammington house. Guest star(s): Son Hyun-joo
328	"So You Can Fly Free"	3 May 2020	12.5%
The family from Jam Jam's new favorite show comes to life and visits her house to play. Kyung-wan plays the role of both mom and dad in a weird way, and sweet Yeon-woo surprises his dad and grandparents. Ha-oh starts the day earlier than the crew. Plus, he becomes cautious of the pandemic as he goes out. Will finds superpowers in his underwear, and Ben becomes independent. Guest star(s): Kim Min-ki and Hong Yoon-hwa
329	"You are My Love"	10 May 2020	13.8%
Jam Jam hosts a concert and gets a lesson in discipline. Yeon-woo learns the concept of time and being on time. Ha-oh spends his day with another one of his favorite singers. Sam gives the kids a magic button to teach them a lesson. Guest star(s): Song Ga-in
330	"Today is Another Fun Day"	17 May 2020	11.3%
Ha-oh and Jam Jam face crisis after crisis while they have another eventful play date. Ha-young's favorite doll comes to life in the most frightening way. Will has a fight with Sam and runs away from home. Ben serves as a mediator while Will hangs out with a funny aunt. Guest star(s): Jeong Ju-ri
331	"My Love, My Family"	24 May 2020	11.8%
Newborn Yi-eum finally gets to go home, and the whole family dotes on her. Ha-oh visits his dad's workplace and truly learns about Gary the rapper. The Hammingtons visit Dorata World, and William experiences what it's like to have an older brother. Guest star(s): Min Woo-hyuk
332	"We are Ordered to Be Happy"	31 May 2020	11.1%
Jam Jam has a fun guest ove who's got many different things prepared. The scary teacher visits the Do house to teach them about manners. Plus, Ha-young learns to talk. Ha-oh learns about the concept of money and get over another fear. The Hammingtons go on a trip to Australia. Guest star(s): Jo Kwon
333	"You, My Beautiful Love"	7 June 2020	9.1%
Ha-oh and Jam Jam go on a trip together to the countryside. Will and Ben can't seem to beat the heat, but Sam finds a creative way to accept it. The Do family make their own coin karaoke at home and predict their future 10 years from now. Guest star(s):
334	"You're Bright Like Sunlight"	14 June 2020	11.0%
Ha-oh helps to celebrate Jam Jam's birthday as they continue their camping trip. Yeon-woo becomes the newest fashion designer. Ben is madly in love with his tricycle, and Will is learning to ditch the training wheels. Guest star(s):
335	"Splendid Childrearing Wraps Around My Body"	21 June 2020	9.1%
Jam Jam gets cheeky on their rooftop camping trip. Ha-young visits a kids cafe for the first time, and a close friend joins them. Plus the Do family picks strawberries. The highly anticipated cognitive test for genius Ha-oh takes place. Will and Ben go through a rough work out with some strong uncles. Guest star(s): Lee Mi-do and Do-hyung
336	"School on Wheels"	28 June 2020	10.6%
Ha-oh learns to make pizza before visit Jam Jam's house where a rooftop kid's cafe is prepared. The Hammingtons cater to an injured Ben. The Do family go on a caravan camping trip. Guest star(s):
337	"Today Shines Again Because I Have You"	5 July 2020	11.6%
The Do family visit a mudflat on their camping trip. Will and Ben are having a chocolate crisis at home, so they visit a car wash to keep occupied. A superman is back on the show with a new addition to the family. Guest star(s):
338	"The Master of Childcare"	12 July 2020	9.6%
Ha-oh is now a skilled tinkerer. Ben learns to not play with the toilet, and they visit their friend. The Do family run a charity drive through sale. Another superman joins with his cute but mischievous young boys. Guest star(s): Han Suk-joon and Sa-bin
339	"Follow Your Heart"	19 July 2020	10.1%
Ha-oh celebrates his 1,000th day. Ben helps plan Will's perfect birthday present. Auditions for the Trot Boys start with some hot talent. The Do family's drive through market reaches a halt, but Superwoman Yoon-jung comes to save the day. Guest star(s): Kim Soo-chan; Noh Ji-hoon and Yi-an; Hong Jam-eon; Lee Chun-soo and Joo-eun; Kim In-seok, Tae-yang and Tae-san
340	"Everybody, Cha, Cha, Cha!"	26 July 2020	10.4%
The Trot Boys recruitment is in full swing, and rehearsals go well, but baby sitting doesn't. Will and Ben help celebrate their dad's birthday. The Do family go on a camping trip, and Ha-young goes kayaking for the first time. Guest star(s): Kim Soo-chan; Noh Ji-hoon and Yi-an; Hong Jam-eon; Lee Chun-soo and Joo-eun; Kim In-seok, Tae-yang and Tae-san; Yoo Ha-na and Do-heon; Song Ga-in, Han-seo and Eun-ho; Koon-zo (Ulala Session) and Na-eol; Joy and Sil-lo (Yang Dong-eun's children); Oh Dae-hwan and Se-eon; Kwon Jae-gwan, Kim Kyung-ah and Sun-yul
341	"Everyone Was a Kid Once"	2 August 2020	10.9%
It's Ha-oh's first day of kindergarten, and it's a struggle for the father and son duo. The Do family continues their camping trip with a hike in the mountains. Will and Ben work hard to promote their dad. Guest star(s): Kim Ho-joong
342	"Our Song is Not Over Yet"	9 August 2020	12.0%
Jam Jam, or grown up Hee-yul rather, says goodbye with a surprise celebration. The Kang-duo take a trip to a treehouse in the forest. Ben wants to start wearing underwear and ditch the diapers, and it clearly is a hectic day. The Do family go on another camping trip, this time, with the busy mom. Guest star(s):
343	"I'll Be Loyal to You"	16 August 2020	9.4%
The Hammingtons become the newest honorary ambassadors for the Korean Coast Guard, and take a tour of the boat. Plus Will and Ben undergo drill training. Hyun-bin takes a tour around his neighborhood, and Ha-jun's idol big brother comes to visit. Guest star(s): Hong Jam-eon
344	"You Can't Be Happier Than This"	23 August 2020	10.3%
The Kang duo continue their trip in the treehouse. A new set of twins make an appearance on the show, and their older sister is put to more work than their dad. Will and Ben get a dream come true with a pool house. The Do school on wheels resume with many hardships. Guest star(s):
345	"Kids Are the Index of the Fathers"	30 August 2020	10.3%
The double sets of twins start day 2, and the reliable big sister once again saves the day. Ha-oh meets his trot auntie and some older boys to play with. The Do family visit a traditional village house. William makes his acting debut. Guest star(s): Song Ga-in, Han-seo and Eun-ho; Choi Jin-hyuk
346	"To My Small and Precious Child"	6 September 2020	10.8%
Yeon-woo proves to be a smart and reliable older brother, and Ha-young is old enough to play with the boys. The Ra-Ra sisters join the do family on their trip. Ha-jun realizes the sacrifices he has to make for his younger sister, and his cousin pays a visit. Sam implements a sticker system to encourage the boys to help out around the house. Guest star(s): Lee Yoon-ji and La-ni
347	"The Study of Memories"	13 September 2020	9.4%
The Do siblings challenge an obstacle course and visit some animals. Ha-oh walks down his dad's memory lane. The Lee double twins move to a new place, and the babies reach some big milestones. The Hammingtons take a train to go on a camping trip in Iksan. Guest star(s):
348	"Upbringing a Child Is an Uphill Road"	20 September 2020	9.4%
Deep in the mountains, the Do trio make woodblock print shirts. Plus, they visit the East Sea with an upgraded camper van. Ha-oh organizes his baby clothes to pass them down to younger friends, and Ha-oh gets a new play date friend. Will and Ben explore the village in Iksan and deliver cake to the villagers. Guest star(s): Jo Jung-chi, Jung-in, Eun and Sung-woo
349	"Today is Yours as Well"	27 September 2020	9.1%
Ha-oh wishes for golden eggs. Will and Ben meet some real life dinosaurs. The twins take time for tactile play, and dad bathes them for the first time. Next stop on the Do family school of wheels is: science. Guest star(s):
350	"You Are Like an Assorted Gift Box to Me"	4 October 2020	13.2%
It's the holidays, so the Park Ha family try to gather virtually, plus Ha-yeon learns to walk. Will and Ben get cooking lessons from a famous chef. Yung-jung visits the Do school on wheels for the holiday. Park Joo-ho teases his family's return. Guest star(s): Lee Yeon-bok, Lee Yoon-ji (via video call), Min Kyung-hoon(via video call)
351	"My Dear Love, You Stay by My Side"	11 October 2020	11.2%
Ha-oh outsmarts his dad for chocolate, and Gary gets invested in some gambling. The Trot Queen visits the Park Ha siblings. Sam shows Ben what it's like to look after Ben. Plus, they visit their cousin. The Do's have a family field day, and Yeon-woo proves again that he's the best older brother. Guest star(s): Kim Yeon-ja
352	"The Parents Need to Grow Up for the Kids to Grow Up"	18 October 2020	10.1%
The Kang family move into a new house, and Jo Eun is Ha-oh's first visitor in the event filled home. Will and Ben play indoor hockey, and a couple of friends pay a visit. Guest star(s): Jo Jung-chi, Jung-in, Eun and Sung-woo; Lee Tae-gyu, Louis and Luna
353	"Love Returns"	25 October 2020	11.3%
At the double twins house, Chun-soo's friends come over to marvel at the big sister. Will and Ben dress up for Halloween and have a scavenger hunt. The Do family go back in time and visit a temple. Park Joo-ho keeps his promise and returns on the show, plus we finally meet the youngest, Jin-woo. Guest star(s): Kim Seung-hyun and his father
354	"It Bloomed Perfectly After Meeting You"	1 November 2020	11.2%
Gary plans a prank filled day for Ha-oh's birthday. Will plays an ice hockey match, and Ben learns the game. Jin-woo has caring older siblings and a father who can't cook. The Do family continue their temple stay, and the boys help Ha-young with her tummy issues. Guest star(s):
355	"Children's Imagination Becomes Real"	8 November 2020	10.0%
To celebrate the show's 7th anniversary, the kids all get together in their own little village since the pandemic has made it difficult to get together. Some of the show's alumni pay a special visit. Meanwhile, Joo-ho finally makes a meal his kids like. Guest star(s):
356	"The Apple of My Eye"	15 November 2020	10.0%
The double twins house is full of milestones as Tae-kang takes some big steps. Ben from 20 years in the future visits the duo. The Park-Ha siblings hand out rice cakes to famous singers since the youngest turns 1. Guest star(s): So Yoo-jin, Yong-hee, Seo-hyun and Se-eun; Lee Sang-yeob
357	"Our Happy Moments Together"	22 November 2020	10.0%
Ha-oh learns the concept of time and gets his watch repaired. Will sells his toys to get a gift for Ben, and Ben's birthday wish to fly comes true. The Do family have a fancy picnic at the park. The Park siblings make a video call to their idol uncle, and they make handmade noodles. Guest star(s): Kwon Jae-gwan and Sun-yul; Hwang Kwang-hee (via video call)
358	"You're Like Jelly, You're So Lovely"	29 November 2020	10.0%
Ha-oh builds his own chair and learns a valuable lesson. The Hammingtons plan an event for their wedding anniversary. This time, it's Yeon-woo's turn to teach the Do School of Wheels. The Park siblings have their favorite uncle visit, and they all transform into ladybugs. Guest star(s): Hwang Kwang-hee
359	"Let's Connect Our Yesterday with Today"	6 December 2020	9.6%
The double twins family visit a familiar grandpa, and big sis Joo-eun checks in on her growth. Will and Ben harvest crops at a farm. Ha-young transforms into Snow White for her 2nd birthday and gets a special present from her mom. Kwang-hee continues the event filled play day at the Park house. Guest star(s): Hwang Kwang-hee
360	"Build a Nest in My Arms"	13 December 2020	10.6%
The Park Ha siblings make cookies and visit a trot icon. Will and Ben help a passionate icon uncle slow down and do things haphazardly. Ha-oh learns an important but frightening lesson about stranger danger. The Do family go hiking, and the kids cater to their dad. Guest star(s): Nam Jin, Yunho (TVXQ), Hey Jini
361	"Dance with Santa"	20 December 2020	9.1%
Santa pays a visit to Ha-oh's house, and so does the coffee princess. Together, that make Ha-oh's Christmas special. Will and Ben protect the house from intruders. A scary trainer visits the Do family to help them reach their goals last minute, and they have an award ceremony. Guest star(s): Yoon Eun-hye, Cho Sae-ho (via phone call)
362	"Being with You Brings Me Happiness"	27 December 2020	10.5%
Gary prepares a special even for Ha-oh's last day on the show. Will and Ben learn about money and economics. The Do family continue on their trip and visit a traditional village. The Park family play in the pool, and Na-eun prepares a special eveny Guest star(s): Sean (Jinusean)

== 2021 ==
No.	Title	Original release date	Rating
363	"Nice to Meet You, Be Happy"	3 January 2021	9.9%
Ha Yeon is having her first birthday party at home. To celebrate, Hyun Bin has prepared a party for her, but he bought too many items to handle alone. So, he asks a very special friend to help out. William and Bentley are obsessed with BTS lately, and they set out to see BTS in person with Sam. Guest star(s): Song Ga-in, TXT
364	"You Are My Ocean, Overflowing Love"	10 January 2021	9.8%
Sam has decided to bring William and Bentley to an indoor surfing studio to challenge themselves. At first, the kids struggle, but they keep at it and eventually learn how to surf. The Doppelgangers are in Mount Jiri to enjoy nature and good food, but there's a real reason why Kyung Wan brought the kids to Mount Jiri. Guest star(s): Hwang Kwang-hee
365	"I'm Grateful I Met You"	17 January 2021	9.9%
The charming Li A and Li Hyun are back. Their mom, Park Se Jin, is pregnant with her third child and is about to go into labor. Because her husband is abroad for a soccer match, she must go to the hospital alone. Next, Sam is worried about his children growing up to be dishonest. So, he plays a game that will teach them a lesson. Guest star(s):
366	"Secret Garden at Home"	24 January 2021	7.9%
As usual, William and Bentley are busy playing and being energetic. Once their friend comes into the house, both of the kids get shy and quiet. The two of them compete against each other to get the friend's affection. Park Joo Ho's self-quarantine is over, and the three siblings finally get to see their dad, who they missed so much. Guest star(s):
367	"The Never-ending Story of Childrearing"	31 January 2021	8.8%
Now that Bentley is older, Sam has decided to get Bentley tutored just like William. When Bentley starts to enjoy the session, William joins in as well. But once William starts to get all the attention, Bentley lashes out. Next, the Yoon Trio is having their first morning without their mom in the house. Guest star(s):
368	"We Shall Be Happy, We Shall Love, We Shall Be Together"	7 February 2021	9.6%
The Yoon Trio is having another day without their mom. Sang Hyun tries his best to take care of the kids and celebrate Hee Seong's birthday. Li Siblings are awaiting their mom to return with their younger sibling, Li Jae. To make up for not being there for the delivery, Young Gwon has prepared an event for Se Jin with the kids. Special appearance(s): Koo Ja-cheol (via video call)
369	"We Hope You Shine This Year As Well"	14 February 2021	11.7%
Sang Hyun is having yet another busy morning taking care of three kids. They all love their dad, so they often compete to get his affection. The Na Na sisters try to outdo each other to get their dad's attention. But Sang Hyun is struggling to keep both of them satisfied without disappointing anyone. Guest star(s): Hwang Kwang-hee, Minho (SHINee) Special appearance(s): Lee Jong-suk (via video call)
370	"The Golden Goal of My Life"	21 February 2021	9.0%
Tae Kang and Joo Yul are having their first birthday party. Due to the situation, Chun Soo decides to hold an online birthday party where he live streams the event. Sang Hyun has a lower back problem, but he still takes care of the children to the best of his ability. For their sick dad, Na Gyeom and Na On aid Sang Hyun with various tasks.. Guest star(s):
371	"Do You Want to Walk with Daddy?"	28 February 2021	8.2%
When William wakes up, he finds his bed soaked. To avoid getting scolded, he hides his bedsheet and blanket with Bentley. Using this, Bentley coerces William into doing his bidding. Hyun Bin takes his kids to a hospital to get their physical exams. The doctor seems to be concerned about Ha Jun's health. Guest star(s):
372	"I'll Protect You Until the End"	7 March 2021	8.4%
Joo Yul and Tae Kang have started walking on their own. As they have grown, Joo Eun has prepared a special lesson for them. Sang Hyun is trying to prepare a surprise event for his wife with Na Gyeom. But it seems more difficult than he imagined due to a certain boy with too much energy. The Hammingtons go into the mountains to enjoy nature together. Guest star(s):
373	"Okay, Shiny Daddy"	14 March 2021	8.6%
Na On has been very vocal about her wish to marry her dad. After countless confessions, Sang Hyun finally holds a wedding for them to make her one and only wish come true. Sam and Yoo Mi is having a serious conversation about moving houses as their contract is up. They bring their kids to look for houses they might move into. Guest star(s):
374	"Spring Will Come to Childrearing"	21 March 2021	8.6%
Sang Hyun informs the Yoon Trio about a guest that will appear. When they hear Sang Hyun address her as his daughter, they are taken aback and get confused. Na On, who is especially attached to her dad, ends up crying. The Hammingtons have moved to their new home and are expecting some guests for a housewarming party. Guest star(s): Roh Jeong-eui; Eva Popiel and No-ah; Rie Akiba and Ye-na; Lee Yoon-ji and So-wool
375	"Being a Dad Makes Me Happy All Year Round"	28 March 2021	8.5%
The Hammingtons head over to a swimming pool to meet up with Marine Boy, Park Tae Hwan. Together, they will swim to donate masks to those who need them the most. Jin-Gun-Navely travels all the way from Ulsan to meet Joo Ho in Suwon. There, they enjoy great food and see Joo Ho train for his upcoming soccer match. Guest star(s): Lee Yeon-bok; Park Tae-hwan; Ali and Do-gun
376	"Getting Used to Childrearing"	4 April 2021	9.5%
Lately, the Yoon Trio didn't get the chance to go to a kids' cafe. To alleviate their boredom, Sang Hyun has prepared a bouncy castle for them to let them play to their heart's content. The Do family is getting on a plane to get to Jeju Island for their next trip. They enjoy picking tangerines and eating tasty food on the island. Guest star(s): Minho (SHINee) Special appearance(s): Lee Dong-gook (via video call)
377	"Hello to a Child Who's Like a Flower Petal"	11 April 2021	7.9%
Na On dotes on her dad, Sang Hyun, but that all changes when a young boy visits. As the Yoon Trio falls for the new boy, Sang Hyun feels upset and betrayed. Yeon Woo and Ha Young want to thank Kyung Wan for taking them to Jeju Island, so they dress themselves up and give Kyung Wan the Two Ggoms' Hotel experience. Guest star(s): Seo Woo-jin
378	"It Was Fate to Have Met You"	18 April 2021	9.7%
The Doppelganger family brought smiles to the audience's faces, but all good things must come to an end. Kyung Wan gets emotional because he has made great memories with the kids on the show. For a proper send-off, the production team prepared a special gift for Kyung Wan for his graduation from the show. Special appearance(s): Kim Soo-mi; Ryu Soo-young (via video call)
379	"A Tale of a Little Kid"	25 April 2021	8.4%
The energetic Yoon family is here to take over the 2021 spring season with their charms. They head over to the fields to harvest some spring greens. Jin-Gun-Navely is expecting Kwang Hee to visit, but he has brought another person with him. He claims to be five years old, but he seems too big and scary to be one. Guest star(s): Kim Soo-mi; Hwang Kwang-hee

== 2022 ==
No.	Title	Original release date	Rating
413	"Can You Remember It For Me?"	2 January 2022	5.2%
Guest star(s): John Park
414	"Here Comes the Tiger with Child-rearing Spirits"	9 January 2022	4.3%
Guest star(s):
415	"You Are the Biggest Prize of My Life"	16 January 2022	4.5%
Guest star(s):
416	"Everyday is New, Thanks to You"	23 January 2022	4.8%
Guest star(s): Yang Ik-june
417	"Grow! Child-rearing is Fun"	30 January 2022	5.1%
Guest star(s): Lee Dae-hoon
418	"The Sweet Life of Child-rearing"	6 February 2022	4.6%
Guest star(s): Kang Min-ho
419	"All of Us Are Parenting"	20 February 2022	4.7%
Guest star(s):
420	"It's Okay to Grow Slowly"	27 February 2022	3.8%
Guest star(s): Jo Woo-jong
421	"We Are Alike"	6 March 2022	3.3%
Guest star(s): Jo Woo-jong, Yoon Suk-min, Ki Bo-bae, Lee Sang-in
422	"Happier Together"	13 March 2022	3.0%
Guest star(s): Jo Woo-jong, Yoon Suk-min, Ki Bo-bae, Lee Sang-in
423	"Our Happy Story"	20 March 2022	3.1%
Guest star(s):
424	"Growing a Little at a Time"	27 March 2022	3.2%
Guest star(s): Chon Tae-poong, Kevin Dockry
425	"I'm Happy Wherever I'm with You"	3 April 2022	3.6%
Guest star(s): Choi Jung-in
426	"A Heart-fluttering Journey of Every Moment with You"	10 April 2022	3.4%
Guest star(s): Hyun Joo-yup
427	"Hello, Nice to Meet You!"	22 April 2022	3.2%
Guest star(s): Jessi
428	"Strong Body, Strong Mind"	29 April 2022	2.4%
Guest star(s): Lee Dae-hoon
429	"Children's Day! As Happy as You Want!"	6 May 2022	1.9%
Guest star(s): Hong Jam Eon
430	"I Guess We Love Spring"	13 May 2022	2.9%
Guest star(s): Yoon Hyun-min
431	"You're the Best, No Matter What!"	20 May 2022	2.5%
Guest star(s):
432	"I'll Show You a New World!"	27 May 2022	2.7%
Guest star(s): Yoon Taek, Kim Bong Gon
433	"I Miss You and Miss You More!"	3 June 2022	2.4%
Guest star(s): Mina Fujii, Yoo Min, Choo Sung-hoon
434	"I Will Be with You at All Your Firsts!"	10 June 2022	3.2%
Guest star(s):
435	"It's a Miracle We Met!"	17 June 2022	2.7%
Guest star(s): Hong Hyun Hee, Jason, Jo Woo-jong
436	"We're Still Growing"	24 June 2022	2.2%
Guest star(s): Kim Soo-mi, Kang Kyung-joon
437	"When You Smile, I Smile"	1 July 2022	2.3%
Guest star(s): Kang Jae Joon, Hwang Je Seong, Park Eun-ji, Jung Joon-ho
438	"Let's Celebrate Today, the Most Special Day Ever"	8 July 2022	2.4%
Guest star(s): Taru Salminen
439	"Hyper Baby is Here!"	15 July 2022	2.0%
Guest star(s): Lee Dae-hoon, Hwang Shin-young
440	"The Birth of a New Superman"	22 July 2022	2.8%
Guest star(s):
441	"Look How Much We've Grown!"	29 July 2022	2.9%
Guest star(s):
442	"The World I Want to Show You"	5 August 2022	2.4%
Guest star(s): Lucky, Alpago Şinasi, Yasmin
443	"My Love, My Everything"	19 August 2022	3.2%
Guest star(s): Kim Da Hyun
444	"Childcare More Refreshing Than a Vacation?"	26 August 2022	3.0%
Guest star(s): Jung Joon-ho
445	"You Are My Universe"	2 September 2022	2.4%
Guest star(s): Jung Joon-ho, Koyote
446	"You're as Bright as the Full Moon"	9 September 2022	2.1%
Guest star(s): Hyuna, Dawn, Alpago Şinasi, Yasmin
447	"The Moment I Learn About You"	16 September 2022	3.0%
Guest star(s): Chon Tae-poong
448	"My Day That Changed After Meeting You"	23 September 2022	2.5%
Guest star(s): Gu Bon-gil, Oh Sang-uk
449	"A Perfect Superman No Matter What Others Say"	30 September 2022	1.8%
Guest star(s): Hwang Kwang-hee
450	"A Miracle That Makes Daily Life Special"	7 October 2022	2.5%
Guest star(s): Choi Yang Rak, Paeng Hyun Sook
451	"A World We Dream Together"	14 October 2022	1.8%
Guest star(s): Chon Tae-poong
452	"Parenting is Beautiful"	21 October 2022	2.9%
Guest star(s): Le Sserafim (Sakura Miyawaki, Hong Eun-chae, Kazuha Nakamura)
453	"We Slowly Resemble Each Other"	28 October 2022	3.0%
Guest star(s): Lee Geum-hee, Lee Chan-won, Na Tae-ju, Hye Eun Yi, Shin Dong-yup, Kim Jun-hyun
454	"Thank You for Being You"	4 November 2022	3.0%
Guest star(s): Lee Dae-hoon
455	"Every Lovely Moment of You"	11 November 2022	2.5%
Guest star(s):
456	"A World Coloured With You"	18 November 2022	2.3%
Guest star(s): Kim Min Kyung
457	"Dad is a National Team Player"	9 December 2022	3.3%
Guest star(s):
458	"I Prepared It for You"	23 December 2022	3.3%
Guest star(s): Jung Dong-Won
459	"My Beloved Family"	30 December 2022	2.3%
Guest star(s):

== 2023 ==
No.	Title	Original release date	Rating
460	"Our Shining End of the Year"	6 January 2023	2.9%
Guest star(s): Paeng Hyun Sook, Kim Gu-ra, Jo Se-ho, Joo Woo-jae, Jang Wooyoung, Kim Sook
461	"Children Who Grow With Love"	13 January 2023	2.8%
Guest star(s):
462	"Bed of Roses for the New Year"	20 January 2023	3.5%
Guest star(s): Jonathan Thona, Kim Jung-hwan (fencer)
463	"It's Better Because We're Together"	27 January 2023	2.9%
Guest star(s):
464	"I Love You with This Heart"	3 February 2023	3.0%
Guest star(s): Jang Young-ran
465	"Cheering on New Challenges"	10 February 2023	3.3%
Guest star(s): Im Chang-jung
466	"The Most Beautiful Moment is Now"	17 February 2023	2.5%
Guest star(s):
467	"I'm Grateful and I Love You and All That"	24 February 2023	2.5%
Guest star(s):
468	"You Can Grow at Your Own Pace"	3 March 2023	1.7%
Guest star(s): Hwang Kwang-hee, The Boyz (Lee Ju-yeon and Younghoon)
469	"You're the Brightest in the Whole World"	10 March 2023	2.0%
Guest star(s): Kangnam
470	"A Magical Day"	17 March 2023	1.9%
Guest star(s): Cho Jun-ho, Cho Jun-hyun
471	"Our First Moments Together"	24 March 2023	2.4%
Guest star(s):
472	"That's How You Grow, Little by Little"	31 March 2023	1.7%
Guest star(s):
473	"Shush, This is a Secret from Mom"	7 April 2023	2.6%
Guest star(s):
474	"You are My Brilliant Spring"	14 April 2023	2.5%
Guest star(s):
475	"You Dreams will Come True"	21 April 2023	2.9%
Guest star(s):
476	"A Newer World will Spread Before You"	28 April 2023	2.2%
Guest star(s): Hong Sung-heon, Hong Hwa-cheol
477	"The Children's Day Special"	5 May 2023	2.8%
Guest star(s):
478	"Welcome to Childcare World"	12 May 2023	2.5%
Guest star(s): Ha Ji-won, Aespa (Karina (Korean Singer and Winter)
479	"A New Start With You"	19 May 2023	2.2%
Guest star(s): Tei, Kim Shin-young
480	"You are My Happiness"	26 May 2023	1.5%
Guest star(s): Song Jin-woo (actor), Monsta X (Kihyun and Joohoney)
481	"The You who makes Me Laugh"	30 May 2023	3.4%
Guest star(s):
482	"You Make My Day Bright"	6 June 2023	3.7%
Guest star(s): Park Se Mi
483	"I Will Give My Fullest Love to You"	13 June 2023	2.4%
Guest star(s):
484	"Thank You for Being Born"	20 June 2023	3.2%
Guest star(s): Yoon Bok-hee
485	"My Forever Superhero"	27 June 2023	3.6%
Guest star(s):
486	"We're Twice As Happy When We Together"	4 July 2023	4.0%
Guest star(s): Jung Sung-ho
487	"Wherever It Is, Let's Go Together"	11 July 2023	3.7%
Guest star(s):
488	"Into The Parenting World"	25 July 2023	2.6%
Guest star(s): Shori J (Mighty Mouse)
489	"I Love You As Much As The Ocean"	1 August 2023	3.1%
Guest star(s):
490	"Oh My Family"	8 August 2023	3.1%
Guest star(s): Hyojung & YooA (Oh My Girl)
491	"Your Smile is My Sunshine"	15 August 2023	3.4%
Guest star(s): Choi Phillip
492	"I Will Remember This Summer Day"	22 August 2023	3.0%
Guest star(s): Itzy, The Boyz
493	"The Way I Love You"	29 August 2023	3.1%
Guest star(s):
494	"Thank You, My Superman"	5 September 2023	2.7%
Guest star(s):
495	"I'll Gift You A Special Day"	12 September 2023	3.4%
Guest star(s):
496	"Miracles Are Always Close By"	19 September 2023	1.6%
Guest star(s): Park Soyul, Moon Heeyul (JamJam)
497	"It Came Like Fate"	10 October 2023	2.8%
Guest star(s): Hanjun & Huiwon (N.SSign)
498	"Our Meeting Was Inevitable"	17 October 2023	3.1%
Guest star(s): Lee Pil-mo, Kim Min-kyoung, Oh Na-mi
499	"I Miss You All The Time"	24 October 2023	3.0%
Guest star(s):
500	"We're 500 Times Happier Because We're Together"	7 November 2023	3.7%
Guest star(s):
501	"You Are My Happiness"	14 November 2023	2.9%
Guest star(s): Oh Sang-uk, Kim Jung-hwan, Park Joon-geum
502	"Shall We Go on a Trip?"	21 November 2023	2.1%
Guest star(s):
503	"Daddy Will Protect You As You Grow Up"	28 November 2023	3.1%
Guest star(s):
504	"All Seasons Are So Precious"	5 December 2023	2.8%
Guest star(s):
505	"With You, Every Day Is Christmas"	12 December 2023	3.1%
Guest star(s):
506	"I Want to Give You My Everything"	19 December 2023	3.5%
Guest star(s): Nam Hee-do
507	"When You Came To Me, It Felt Like a Dream"	26 December 2023	3.7%
Guest star(s): Lee Cheol-min, Choi Soo-jong, Sayuri Fujita, Zen

== 2024 ==
No.	Title	Original release date	Rating
508	"Our Happy Time"	2 January 2024	3.0%
Families shown in the episode: Kim Jun-ho (Kim Eun-woo); Jasson (Yeon Jun-beom); Park Joo-ho (Park Na-eun, Park Gun-hoo, & Park Jin-woo); Kang Kyung-joon (Kang Jung-an, Kang Jung-woo); Lee Pil-mo (Lee Dam-ho, Lee Do-ho); Jung Sung-ho (Jung Soo-ah, Jung Soo-ae, Jung Soo-hyun, Jung Jae-bum, Jung Ha-neul); Guest star(s): Choo Sung-hoon, Lee Jae-ah, Lee Jae-si, Lee Si-an, Kim Ho-young, Lee Eun-ji Special appearance(s): Cha Jun-hwan (via short video); Lee Seung-woo (via short video); TVXQ Changmin (via short video); Hwang Kwang-hee (via short video); Enhypen Sunghoon (via short video); The Boyz Juyeon & Younghoon (via short video); Hwang Je-seong (via short video); Kim Jae-joon (via short video)
509	"Let's Rise Up Again In The New Year"	9 January 2024	2.2%
Families shown in the episode: Jasson (Yeon Jun-beom); Lee Pil-mo (Lee Dam-ho, Lee Do-ho); Guest star(s): Park Seul-gi, Gong Moon-sung, Bae Yoon-jung, Hyerim, Shin Min-chul, The One, Lee Jung Special appearance(s): —
510	"Look Closely. This Is How A Super Mom Parents."	16 January 2024	2.3%
Families shown in the episode: Kim Jun-ho (Kim Eun-woo & Kim Jung-woo); Honey J (Jung Love); Guest star(s): — Special appearance(s): —
511	"We Shine So Bright"	23 January 2024	2.0%
Families shown in the episode: Kim Jun-ho (Kim Eun-woo & Kim Jung-woo); Park Joo-ho (Park Gun-hoo & Park Jin-woo); Guest star(s): Fly to the Sky Brian Joo Special appearance(s): —
512	"Hey, Gather At My House!"	30 January 2024	2.3%
Families shown in the episode: Jasson (Yeon Jun-beom); Honey J (Jung Love); Guest star(s): Aiki, Noze, Leejung, Gabee Special appearance(s): —
513	"Let's Always Be Together In The New Year"	6 February 2024	2.4%
Families shown in the episode: Kim Jun-ho (Kim Eun-woo & Kim Jung-woo); Honey J (Jung Love); Guest star(s): — Special appearance(s): —
514	"The True Child-Rearing Master Is Here"	13 February 2024	2.1%
Families shown in the episode: Jasson (Yeon Jun-beom); Jung Sung-ho (Jung Soo-ah, Jung Soo-ae, Jung Soo-hyun, Jung Jae-bum, Jung Ha-neul); Guest star(s): Sleepy, Ayumi Special appearance(s): —
515	"My Love, My Star"	20 February 2024	2.1%
Families shown in the episode: Kim Jun-ho (Kim Eun-woo & Kim Jung-woo); Honey J (Jung Love); Guest star(s): Jin Sung Special appearance(s): —
516	"The Brightest Superman In The World"	27 February 2024	2.2%
Families shown in the episode: Jasson (Yeon Jun-beom); Jo Hyeon-woo (Jo Ha-rin & Jo Yerin); Guest star(s): Park Seul-gi, Bae Yoon-jung Special appearance(s): —
517	"High-Energy Super Parenting"	5 March 2024	2.7%
Families shown in the episode: Kim Jun-ho (Kim Eun-woo & Kim Jung-woo); Moon Hee-joon (Moon Hee-yul & Moon Hee-woo); Guest star(s): Kim Ho-young Special appearance(s): —
518	"Pit-A-Pat, Our Meeting"	12 March 2024	2.4%
Families shown in the episode: Kim Jun-ho (Kim Eun-woo & Kim Jung-woo); So Yoo-jin (Paik Se-eun); Guest star(s): Astro Cha Eun-woo, Bada Special appearance(s): Kim Ho-young (via video call)
519	"Let's Celebrate Every Moment"	19 March 2024	2.0%
Families shown in the episode: Jo Hyeon-woo (Jo Ha-rin & Jo Yerin); Park Joo-ho (Park Gun-hoo & Park Jin-woo); Moon Hee-joon (Moon Hee-yul & Moon Hee-woo); Guest star(s): — Special appearance(s): —
520	"You Are My Spring"	7 April 2024	2.1%
Panelists: Families shown in the episode: Choi Min-hwan (Choi Jae-yul, Choi Ah-yoon, Choi Ah-rin); Honey J (Jung Love); Kim Jun-ho (Kim Eun-woo & Kim Jung-woo); Guest star(s): Lee Eun-ji Special appearance(s): —
521	"A Happy Spring Picnic Together"	14 April 2024	2.2%
Panelists: Families shown in the episode: Choi Min-hwan (Choi Jae-yul, Choi Ah-yoon, Choi Ah-rin); Moon Hee-joon (Moon Hee-yul & Moon Hee-woo); Jasson (Yeon Jun-beom); Guest star(s): Kang So-ra Special appearance(s): —
522	"Yo! Hip-Hop Baby is Here."	21 April 2024	1.6%
Panelists: So Yoo-jin; Kim Jun-ho; Moon Hee-joon; Jasson; BewhY; Families shown in the episode:Kim Jun-ho (Kim Eun-woo & Kim Jung-woo); BewhY (Lee Si-ha); Guest star(s): XIA Junsu Special appearance(s): —
523	"Spring, Spring, Spring Is Here"	28 April 2024	1.7%
Panelists: So Yoo-jin; Kim Jun-ho; Jasson; Moon Hee-joon; Choi Min-hwan; Families shown in the episode: Choi Min-hwan (Choi Jae-yul, Choi Ah-yoon, Choi Ah-rin); Moon Hee-joon (Moon Hee-yul & Moon Hee-woo); Guest star(s): — Special appearance(s): —
524	"The Greatest Gift in The World"	5 May 2024	2.7%
Panelists: So Yoo-jin; Kim Jun-ho; Jasson; Moon Hee-joon; DinDin; Families shown in the episode: DinDin (Niccolo); Kim Jun-ho (Kim Eun-woo & Kim Jung-woo); Guest star(s): — Special appearance(s): —
525	"Every Day is A Warm Spring Day When I Look at You"	12 May 2024	3.0%
Panelists: So Yoo-jin; Kim Jun-ho; Jasson; Moon Hee-joon; DinDin; Families shown in the episode: DinDin (Niccolo); Jasson (Yeon Jun-beom); Guest star(s): Sleepy; Park Seul-gi; Gong Moon-sung; Yoo Seon-ho Special appearance(s):
526	"Happiness From The Heart"	19 May 2024	2.8%
Panelists: So Yoo-jin; Kim Jun-ho; Jasson; Moon Hee-joon; Choi Min-hwan; Honey J Families shown in the episode: Choi Min-hwan (Choi Jae-yul, Choi Ah-yoon, Choi Ah-rin); Moon Hee-joon (Moon Hee-yul & Moon Hee-woo); Kim Jun-ho (Kim Eun-woo & Kim Jung-woo); Guest star(s): — Special appearance(s): —
527	"Happy First Birthday" (Korean: 첫 생일을 축하해)	26 May 2024	3.0%
Panelists: So Yoo-jin; Kim Jun-ho; Jasson; Moon Hee-joon; Honey J Families shown in the episode: Kim Jun-ho (Kim Eun-woo & Kim Jung-woo); Honey J (Jung Love); Guest star(s): Kang Ye-seul; Jung Da-kyung; Hong Ji-yoon; Monika; Lip J Special appearance(s):Kim Jung-hwan; Shim Jae-bok; Jo Won-woo; Kim Jun-hyeon; Jang Jung-min; Kim Tae-hoon; Kang Hyun-suk; Lee Jun-yi; Heo Min-ho; EEVE (HolyBang); TARO (HolyBang)
528	"I'll do anything for you" (Korean: 너를 위해서라면 뭐든 다 해줄게)	2 June 2024	2.4%
Panelists: So Yoo-jin; Kim Jun-ho; Jasson; Moon Hee-joon; Jang Dong-min; Families shown in the episode: Kim Jun-ho (Kim Eun-woo & Kim Jung-woo); Moon Hee-joon (Moon Hee-yul & Moon Hee-woo); Guest star(s): Choi Hyun-soo; Hong Se-hwa; Lim Kang-eun; Jung Hee-sung; Choi Sun-woo; Kim Hyung-bin Special appearance(s):—
529	"Parenting? Don't Try To Be Perfect" (Korean: 육아? 그까이거~ 그냥 뭐 대충)	9 June 2024	3.2%
Panelists: So Yoo-jin; Kim Jun-ho; Jasson; Moon Hee-joon; Bada; Jang Dong-min; Families shown in the episode: Bada (Kim Lu-a); Jang Dong-min (Jang Ji-woo); Guest star(s): — Special appearance(s): —
530	"The New Hosts" (Korean: 너는 나의 빛나는 금메달)	16 June 2024	2.8%
Panelists: Choi Ji-woo; Ahn Young-mi; Kim Jun-ho; Jasson; Moon Hee-joon; Choi Min-hwan; Families shown in the episode: Kim Jun-ho (Kim Eun-woo & Kim Jung-woo); Choi Min-hwan (Choi Jae-yul); Guest star(s): — Special appearance(s): —
531	"A Birthday Trip and the Taekwondo Competition" (Korean: 오늘도 사랑이 내린다)	23 June 2024	2.7%
Panelists: Choi Ji-woo; Ahn Young-mi; Kim Jun-ho; Jasson; Moon Hee-joon; BewhY; Families shown in the episode: Jasson (Yeon Jun-beom); Choi Min-hwan (Choi Jae-yul, Choi Ah-yoon, Choi Ah-rin); Guest star(s): Wooyeon & Nana (Woo!ah!) Special appearance(s): —
532	"The Athletic Niccolo and Adorable Si Ha" (Korean: 우리 함께하면 행복도 두 배~)	30 June 2024	2.6%
Panelists: Choi Ji-woo; Ahn Young-mi; Kim Jun-ho; Jasson; Moon Hee-joon; DinDin; Families shown in the episode: DinDin (Niccolo); BewhY (Lee Si-ha); Guest star(s): Yu Hyeju Special appearance(s): —
533	"Let All My Wishes Come True" (Korean: 호이! 호이! 모두 다 이루어져라~)	7 July 2024	3%
Panelists: Choi Ji-woo; Ahn Young-mi; Kim Jun-ho; Jasson; Moon Hee-joon; DinDin; Families shown in the episode: Kim Jun-ho (Kim Eun-woo & Kim Jung-Woo); DinDin (Niccolo); Guest star(s): Kim Ho-Young Special appearance(s): —
534	"I Love You, Be Happy, Let's Be Together" (Korean: 사랑해 행복해 함께해)	14 July 2024	2.9%
Panelists: Choi Ji-woo; Ahn Young-mi; Kim Jun-ho; Jasson; Moon Hee-joon; Jang Dong-min; Families shown in the episode: Jang Dong-min (Jang Ji-woo); Choi Min-hwan (Choi Jae-yul, Choi Ah-yoon, Choi Ah-rin); Guest star(s): — Special appearance(s): —
535	"Every New Experience with You Is Precious" (Korean: 너와 함께 하는 처음은 모두 소중해)	21 July 2024	2.6%
Panelists: Choi Ji-woo; Ahn Young-mi; Kim Jun-ho; Jasson; Moon Hee-joon; DinDin; Families shown in the episode: Jasson (Yeon Jun-beom); Kim Jun-ho (Kim Eun-woo & Kim Jung-Woo); Moon Hee-joon (Moon Hee-yul & Moon Hee-woo); Guest star(s): Baekho; Ive Special appearance(s): —
536	"Jeju Trip Part 2, Niccolo Meets a Baby" (Korean: 우리 함께 놀아요~)	11 August 2024	3.3%
Panelists: Choi Ji-woo; Ahn Young-mi; Kim Jun-ho; Jasson; Moon Hee-joon; DinDin; Families shown in the episode: Kim Jun-ho (Kim Eun-woo & Kim Jung-Woo); DinDin (Niccolo); Guest star(s): Baekho; Sleepy (Woo-Ah) Special appearance(s): Oh Sang-uk(via short video)
537	"The Soon to Be Dad and Jun Beom TV" (Korean: 전복이 아빠의 첫 인사)	18 August 2024	3.1%
Panelists: Choi Ji-woo; Ahn Young-mi; Jasson; DinDin; Park Soo-hong; Families shown in the episode: Park Soo-hong; Jasson (Yeon Jun-beom); Guest star(s): — Special appearance(s): —
538	"I Miss You, and I Miss You More" (Korean: 보고 싶고, 또 보고 싶어)	25 August 2024	3.2%
Panelists: Choi Ji-woo; Ahn Young-mi; Jasson; DinDin; Kim Jun-ho; Choi Min-hwan; Park Soo-hong; Families shown in the episode: Park Soo-hong; Kim Jun-ho (Kim Eun-woo & Kim Jung-Woo); Guest star(s): Nam Hee Doo; Lee Nayeon Special appearance(s): Choi Seung-Don; Kim Jung-hwan; Do Gyeong-dong(via short video)
539	"The Shinning Gold Medalist Uncles" (Korean: 빛나는 금메달 삼촌들)	1 September 2024	3.5%
Panelists: Choi Ji-woo; Kim Jun-ho; Choi Min-hwan; Park Soo-hong; Families shown in the episode: Kim Jun-ho (Kim Eun-woo & Kim Jung-Woo); Choi Min-hwan (Choi Jae-yul, Choi Ah-yoon, Choi Ah-rin); Guest star(s): Oh Sang-uk; Do Gyeong-dong Special appearance(s): —
540	"You're So Cute, I Want To Hug You Tightly" (Korean: 귀여워서 꼬옥~ 안아주고 싶어)	8 September 2024	2.6%
Panelists: Choi Ji-woo; Ahn Young-mi; DinDin; Park Soo-hong; Families shown in the episode: Park Soo-hong (Abalone); DinDin (Niccolo); Guest star(s): Yoo Seon-ho; Park Seul-gi Special appearance(s): —
540	"You're So Cute, I Want To Hug You Tightly" (Korean: 귀여워서 꼬옥~ 안아주고 싶어)	8 September 2024	2.6%
Panelists: Choi Ji-woo; Ahn Young-mi; DinDin; Park Soo-hong; Families shown in the episode: Park Soo-hong (Abalone); DinDin (Niccolo); Guest star(s): Yoo Seon-ho; Park Seul-gi Special appearance(s): —
541	"Thank You For Growing Up Well" (Korean: 잘 자라줘서 고마워)	22 September 2024	3,3%
Panelists: Choi Ji-woo; Ahn Young-mi; Jang Dong-min; Jo Hye-ryun; DinDin; Park Soo-hong; Families shown in the episode: Jang Dong-min (Jang Ji-woo & Jang Si-Woo); Kim Jun-ho (Kim Eun-woo & Kim Jung-woo); Guest star(s): Jo Hye-ryun Special appearance(s): —
542	"Children Grow As Much As You Wait" (Korean: 기다린 만큼 아이는 자란다)	29 September 2024	2,5%
Panelists: Choi Ji-woo; Ahn Young-mi; Jasson; Kim Jun-ho; Choi Min-hwan; Families shown in the episode: Jasson (Yeon Jun-beom); Kim Jun-ho (Kim Eun-woo & Kim Jung-woo); Guest star(s): Chef Jung Ho-Young Special appearance(s): —
543	"Perfect happiness is you!" (Korean: 완벽한 행복은 바로 너야!)	6 October 2024	2,6%
Panelists: Choi Ji-woo; Ahn Young-mi; Jasson; Kim Jun-ho; Park Soo-hong; Families shown in the episode: Kim Jun-ho (Kim Eun-woo & Kim Jung-woo); Choi Min-hwan (Choi Jae-yul, Choi Ah-yoon, Choi Ah-rin); Guest star(s): — Special appearance(s): —
544	"Trot Queen Super Mom has appeared!" (Korean: 트롯 퀸 슈퍼맘이 나타났다!)	13 October 2024	3,3%
Panelists: Choi Ji-woo; Ahn Young-mi; Jasson; Jeong Mi-ae; Kim Jun-ho; Park Soo-hong; Families shown in the episode: Jeong Mi-ae (Cho Jae-woon, Cho In-sung, Cho A-Young, Cho Seung-Woo); Jasson (Yeon Jun-beom); Guest star(s): Oh Na-mi; Park Min Special appearance(s): —
545	"Everyone, Abalone was born!" (Korean: 여러분~ 전복이가 태어났어요!)	20 October 2024	3.8%
Panelists: Choi Ji-woo; Ahn Young-mi; Jasson; Jang Dong-min; Kim Jun-ho; Park Soo-hong; Families shown in the episode: Park Soo-hong (Abalone); Jang Dong-min (Jang Ji-woo & Jang Si-Woo); Guest star(s): Lee Ji-hye Special appearance(s): —
546	"We All Love Ji woo" (Korean: 우리 모두 사랑하지우!)	27 October 2024	2,5%
Panelists: Choi Ji-woo; Ahn Young-mi; Jasson; Jang Dong-min; Kim Jun-ho; Park Soo-hong; Dindin; Families shown in the episode: Jang Dong-min (Jang Ji-woo & Jang Si-Woo); Park Soo-hong (Abalone); DinDin (Niccolo); Guest star(s): Lee Ji-hye Special appearance(s): —
547	"Your World Will Be Entirely Beautiful" (Korean: 너의 세상은 온통 아름다울 거야~)	6 November 2024	3,3%
Panelists: Choi Ji-woo; Ahn Young-mi; Kim Jun-ho; Park Soo-hong; DinDin; Jeong Mi-ae; Families shown in the episode: Park Soo-hong (Abalone); Kim Jun-ho (Kim Eun-woo & Kim Jung-woo); Jeong Mi-ae (Cho Jae-woon, Cho In-sung, Cho A-Young, Cho Seung-Woo); Guest star(s): — Special appearance(s): —
548	"Good Baby, Just Like Me." (Korean: 날 닮은 굿 베이비.)	13 November 2024	3.4%
Panelists: Choi Ji-woo; Ahn Young-mi; Kim Jun-ho; Park Soo-hong; Jeong Mi-ae; Families shown in the episode: Kim Jun-ho (Kim Eun-woo & Kim Jung-woo); Inbee Park (Nam In-seo); Guest star(s): — Special appearance(s): —
549	"I Really Like You Who Look Like The Ocean" (Korean: 바다를 닮은 니가 참 좋아)	20 November 2024	2.5%
Panelists: Choi Ji-woo; Ahn Young-mi; Park Soo-hong; Bada; Families shown in the episode: Kim Jun-ho (Kim Eun-woo & Kim Jung-woo); Park Soo-hong (Jaeyi); Bada (Lua); Guest star(s): — Special appearance(s): Yoon-min (member of Touched)
550	"It's Supernatural That I Love You" (Korean: 너를 사랑하는 건 슈퍼 내추럴)	27 November 2024	2.8%
Panelists: Choi Ji-woo; Ahn Young-mi; Kim Jun-ho; Park Soo-hong; Jang Dong-min; Shin Bong-sun; Families shown in the episode: Kim Jun-ho (Kim Eun-woo & Kim Jung-woo); Jang Dong-min (Jang Ji-woo & Jang Si-Woo); Guest star(s): Minji (singer); Shin Bong-sun; Kim Min-kyung (comedian) Special appearance(s): —
551	"Our Sparkling Day" (Korean: 반짝반짝 빛나는 우리의 오늘)	4 December 2024	2.8%
Panelists: Choi Ji-woo; Ahn Young-mi; Kim Jun-ho; Park Soo-hong; Jeong Mi-ae; Kang Jae-joon; Families shown in the episode: Kim Jun-ho (Kim Eun-woo & Kim Jung-woo); Jeong Mi-ae (Cho Jae-woon, Cho In-sung, Cho A-Young, Cho Seung-Woo); Guest star(s): Kim Jung-hwan (Royi) Special appearance(s): —
552	"You're Always the Number One In My Heart" (Korean: 내 마음속 1등은 늘 너야)	11 December 2024	3.7%
Panelists: Choi Ji-woo; Ahn Young-mi; Jang Dong-min; Park Soo-hong; Kim Jun-ho; Shin Bong-sun; Families shown in the episode: Park Soo-hong (Jaeyi); Kim Jun-ho (Kim Eun-woo & Kim Jung-woo); Jang Dong-min (Jang Ji-woo & Jang Si-Woo); Guest star(s): Son Hun-su Special appearance(s): —
553	"Even More Happiness Because We're Together" (Korean: 함께라서 더 큰 행복)	18 December 2024	2.9%
Panelists: Choi Ji-woo; Ahn Young-mi; Kim Jun-ho; Jang Dong-min; Park Soo-hong; Jeong Mi-ae; Families shown in the episode: Park Soo-hong (Jaeyi); Kim Jun-ho (Kim Eun-woo & Kim Jung-woo); Jang Dong-min (Jang Ji-woo & Jang Si-Woo); Jeong Mi-ae (Cho Jae-woon, Cho In-sung, Cho A-Young, Cho Seung-Woo); Guest star(s): — Special appearance(s): —
554	"Let's be together! Merry Christmas" (Korean: 우리 함께해요~ 메리 크리스마스)	25 December 2024	4%
Panelists: Choi Ji-woo; Ahn Young-mi; Kim Jun-ho; Park Soo-hong; Jeong Mi-ae; Families shown in the episode: Kim Jun-ho (Kim Eun-woo & Kim Jung-woo); Jang Dong-min (Jang Ji-woo & Jang Si-Woo); Woo Hye-lim (Shin Si-Woo); Guest star(s): — Special appearance(s): —

== 2025 ==
No.	Title	Original release date	Rating
555	"The Year of the Blue Snake, Full of Joy, Full of Love" (Korean: 푸른 뱀의 해엔 행복 가득, 사랑 가득~)	1 January 2025	4.2%
Panelists: Choi Ji-woo; Ahn Young-mi; Kim Jun-ho; Park Soo-hong; Kang Jae-jun; Families shown in the episode: Kang Jae-jun (Hyun-jo); Kim Jun-ho (Kim Eun-woo & Kim Jung-woo); Guest star(s): — Special appearance(s): —
556	"Our Meeting Doubles the Joy" (Korean: 우리의 만남은 기쁨이 두 배가 되지우)	8 January 2025	3.6%
Panelists: Choi Ji-woo; Ahn Young-mi; Park Soo-hong; Jeong Mi-ae; Families shown in the episode: Jang Dong-min (Jang Ji-woo & Jang Si-Woo); Jeong Mi-ae (Cho Jae-woon, Cho In-sung, Cho A-Young, Cho Seung-Woo); Guest star(s): Choi Ji-woo Special appearance(s): Yang Ji-eun; Hong-Ja; Noh Sa-yeon
557	"Welcome to the Earth" (Korean: 지구별에 온 너를 환영해)	15 January 2025	4.7%
Panelists: Choi Ji-woo; Ahn Young-mi; Kim Jun-ho; Park Soo-hong; Woo Hye-lim; Families shown in the episode: Woo Hye-lim (Shin Si-Woo & Shin Sian); Kim Jun-ho (Kim Eun-woo & Kim Jung-woo); Guest star(s): — Special appearance(s): —
558	"Thank You for Coming To Me" (Korean: 나에게 와줘서 고마워)	22 January 2025	3.8%
Panelists: Choi Ji-woo; Ahn Young-mi; Kim Jun-ho; Park Soo-hong; Families shown in the episode: Park Soo-hong (Jaeyi); Jung Sung-ho (Jung Soo-ah, Jung Soo-ae, Jung Soo-hyun, Jung Jae-bum, Jung Ha-neul); Guest star(s): — Special appearance(s): —
559	"The More You Get Excited, the Better" (Korean: 설레는 건 많을수록 좋아)	5 February 2025	3.7%
Panelists: Choi Ji-woo; Ahn Young-mi; Kim Jun-ho; Park Soo-hong; Jang Dong-min; Families shown in the episode: Kim Jun-ho (Kim Eun-woo & Kim Jung-woo); Jang Dong-min (Jang Ji-woo & Jang Si-Woo); Guest star(s): — Special appearance(s): —
560	"Congratulations, I love you, Let's Be Together" (Korean: 축하해, 사랑해, 함께해)	12 February 2025	3.6%
Panelists: Choi Ji-woo; Ahn Young-mi; Park Soo-hong; Song Seon-mi; Families shown in the episode: Kim Jun-ho (Kim Eun-woo & Kim Jung-woo); Song Seon-mi (Go Ah-ri); Guest star(s): — Special appearance(s): —
561	"We’re Growing Up Well" (Korean: 우리 잘 자라고 있어요)	19 February 2025	3.1%
Panelists: Choi Ji-woo; Ahn Young-mi; Kim Jun-ho; Park Soo-hong; Families shown in the episode: Kim Jun-ho (Kim Eun-woo & Kim Jung-woo); Jung Sung-ho (Jung Soo-ah, Jung Soo-ae, Jung Soo-hyun, Jung Jae-bum, Jung Ha-neul); Guest star(s): Katuri Special appearance(s): —
562	"I Like Every Day With You" (Korean: 너와 함께하는 모든 날이 좋아)	26 February 2025	3.3%
Panelists: Choi Ji-woo; Ahn Young-mi; Park Soo-hong; Woo Hye-lim; Jang Dong-min; Families shown in the episode: Woo Hye-lim (Shin Si-Woo & Shin Sian); Jang Dong-min (Jang Ji-woo & Jang Si-Woo); Guest star(s): — Special appearance(s): —
563	"I'll Protect You Forever" (Korean: 영원히 너를 지켜줄게)	5 March 2025	3.2%
Panelists: Choi Ji-woo; Ahn Young-mi; Park Soo-hong; Jang Dong-min; Families shown in the episode: Kim Jun-ho (Kim Eun-woo & Kim Jung-woo); Jang Dong-min (Jang Ji-woo & Jang Si-Woo); Guest star(s): Jung Ji-sun Special appearance(s): —
564	"Only Your Superman" (Korean: 오로지 너만의 슈퍼맨)	12 March 2025	3.2%
Panelists: Choi Ji-woo; Ahn Young-mi; Park Soo-hong; Kim Jun-ho; Oh Jong-hyuk; Families shown in the episode: Park Soo-hong (Jaeyi); Oh Jong-hyuk (Oh Rosy); Guest star(s): Choi Eun-kyeong; Kim Sae-rom; Kim In-seok; Jang Young-ran; Lee Kwang-gi Special appearance(s): —
565	"You Grow Just Like Spring" (Korean: 봄처럼 너는 자란다)	19 March 2025	3.4%
Panelists: Choi Ji-woo; Ahn Young-mi; Park Soo-hong; Kim Jun-ho; Woo Hye-lim; Families shown in the episode: Woo Hye-lim (Shin Si-Woo & Shin Sian); Kim Jun-ho (Kim Eun-woo & Kim Jung-woo); Guest star(s): June Elizabeth Kang Special appearance(s): —
566	"Dad Never Gets Tired" (Korean: 아빠는 절대 지치지 않아)	26 March 2025	3.9%
Panelists: Choi Ji-woo; Ahn Young-mi; Park Soo-hong; Oh Jong-hyuk; Families shown in the episode: Park Soo-hong (Jaeyi); Oh Jong-hyuk (Oh Rosy); Guest star(s): — Special appearance(s): Son Heon Su
567	"A Trot Prodigy Appeared" (Korean: 트로트 신동이 나타났다)	2 April 2025	3.7%
Panelists: Choi Ji-woo; Ahn Young-mi; Park Soo-hong; Hwang Min-ho; Kim Jun-ho; Families shown in the episode: Kim Jun-ho (Kim Eun-woo & Kim Jung-woo); Hwang Min-ho & Hwang Min-Woo; Guest star(s): Kim Yon-ja Special appearance(s): —
568	"You Are a Miracle to Me" (Korean: 나에게 넌 기적이야)	9 April 2025	3.7%
Panelists: Choi Ji-woo; Ahn Young-mi; Park Soo-hong; Hwang Min-ho; Kim Jun-ho; Families shown in the episode: Kim Jun-ho (Kim Eun-woo & Kim Jung-woo); Hwang Min-ho & Hwang Min-Woo; Guest star(s): — Special appearance(s): —
569	"A Generous Heart" (Korean: 아낌없이 주는 마음)	16 April 2025	3.4%
Panelists: Choi Ji-woo; Ahn Young-mi; Park Soo-hong; Inbee Park; Families shown in the episode: Park Soo-hong (Jaeyi); Inbee Park (Nam In-seo); Guest star(s): — Special appearance(s): —
570	"The Spring Days Shine More Because We’re Together" (Korean: 함께여서 더 빛나는 봄날)	23 April 2025	3%
Panelists: Choi Ji-woo; Ahn Young-mi; Park Soo-hong; Jang Dong-min; Kim Jun-ho; Families shown in the episode: Kim Jun-ho (Kim Eun-woo & Kim Jung-woo); Jang Dong-min (Jang Ji-woo & Jang Si-Woo); Guest star(s): Kim Jun-ho Special appearance(s): —
571	"Twice the Happiness as We Travel Together" (Korean: 같이 떠나니 행복도 두 배~)	30 April 2025	2.8%
Panelists: Choi Ji-woo; Ahn Young-mi; Park Soo-hong; Woo Hye-lim; Hwang Min-ho; Families shown in the episode: Hwang Min-ho & Hwang Min-Woo; Woo Hye-lim (Shin Si-Woo & Shin Sian); Guest star(s): — Special appearance(s): —
572	"You’re Lovable Every Day" (Korean: 매일매일 사랑스러워)	7 May 2025	2.4%
Panelists: Choi Ji-woo; Ahn Young-mi; Park Soo-hong; Woo Hye-lim; Families shown in the episode: Park Soo-hong (Jaeyi); Woo Hye-lim (Shin Si-Woo & Shin Sian); Guest star(s): — Special appearance(s): —
573	"To Fill A Page" (Korean: 한 페이지가 될 수 있게)	14 May 2025	3.3%
Panelists: Choi Ji-woo; Ahn Young-mi; Park Soo-hong; Kim Jun-ho; Jang Dong-min; Families shown in the episode: Kim Jun-ho (Kim Eun-woo & Kim Jung-woo); Jang Dong-min (Jang Ji-woo & Jang Si-Woo); Guest star(s): Shin Bong-sun; Kim Dae-hee Special appearance(s): —
574	"The Biggest Present of My Life" (Korean: 내 생에 가장 큰 선물)	21 May 2025	2.8%
Panelists: Choi Ji-woo; Ahn Young-mi; Park Soo-hong; Jang Dong-min; Inbee Park; Families shown in the episode: Kim Jun-ho (Kim Eun-woo & Kim Jung-woo); Inbee Park (Nam In-seo); Guest star(s): — Special appearance(s): —
575	"Run, Laugh and Have Fun" (Korean: 뛰고 웃고 즐기고)	28 May 2025	2.4%
Panelists: Choi Ji-woo; Ahn Young-mi; Park Soo-hong; Jang Dong-min; Hwang Min-ho; Families shown in the episode: Hwang Min-ho & Hwang Min-Woo; Oh Jong-hyuk (Oh Rosy); Guest star(s): — Special appearance(s): —
576	"Oh, Happy Day!" (Korean: 오, 해피데이!)	4 June 2025	2.7%
Panelists: Choi Ji-woo; Ahn Young-mi; Park Soo-hong; Woo Hye-lim; Kim Jun-ho; Families shown in the episode: Woo Hye-lim (Shin Si-Woo & Shin Sian); Kim Jun-ho (Kim Eun-woo & Kim Jung-woo); Guest star(s): Yeji & Chaeryeong (Itzy) Special appearance(s): —
577	"Come Over To My House" (Korean: 우리 집에 놀러 와)	11 June 2025	2.7%
Panelists: Choi Ji-woo; Ahn Young-mi; Park Soo-hong; Kim Jun-ho; Families shown in the episode: Hwang Min-ho & Hwang Min-Woo; Park Soo-hong (Jaeyi); Kim Jun-ho (Kim Eun-woo & Kim Jung-woo); Guest star(s): Kim Soo Chan; Oh Ji-yul Special appearance(s): —
578	"The Challenge of Superman Dad" (Korean: 슈퍼맨 아빠의 도전)	18 June 2025	2.7%
Panelists: Choi Ji-woo; Ahn Young-mi; Park Soo-hong; Jang Dong-min; Families shown in the episode: Kim Jun-ho (Kim Eun-woo & Kim Jung-woo); Jang Dong-min (Jang Ji-woo & Jang Si-Woo); Guest star(s): — Special appearance(s): —
579	"When You Smile, I Am Happy Too" (Korean: 네가 웃으면 나도 좋아!)	25 June 2025	3.1%
Panelists: Choi Ji-woo; Ahn Young-mi; Park Soo-hong; Families shown in the episode: Kim Jun-ho (Kim Eun-woo & Kim Jung-woo); Inbee Park (Nam In-seo); Guest star(s): — Special appearance(s): —
580	"You’ll Only Walk on Flower Paths" (Korean: 꽃길만 걷게 해줄게)	2 July 2025	3%
Panelists: — Families shown in the episode: Hwang Min-ho & Hwang Min-Woo; Inbee Park (Nam In-seo); Guest star(s): — Special appearance(s): —
581	"Here Comes the Energetic Super Mom" (Korean: 하이텐션 슈퍼맘의 등장)	9 July 2025	—
Panelists: — Families shown in the episode: — Guest star(s): — Special appearance(s): —
582	"Giving Happiness, Joy of Receiving" (Korean: —)	16 July 2025	3.3%
Panelists: — Families shown in the episode: Kim Jun-ho (Kim Eun-woo & Kim Jung-woo); Guest star(s): Kim Ho-young; Jang Soo-Won Special appearance(s): —
583	"We Love You More Every Day" (Korean: 하루하루 더 사랑해)	23 July 2025	3.7%
Panelists: — Families shown in the episode: Kim Jun-ho (Kim Eun-woo & Kim Jung-woo); Guest star(s): — Special appearance(s): —
584	"Thank You for Being Born" (Korean: 태어나줘서 고마워)	30 July 2025	3.4%
Panelists: — Families shown in the episode: — Guest star(s): Park Seol-Gi Special appearance(s): —
585	"One Cool Day in Summer" (Korean: 어느 멋진 여름날)	13 August 2025	3.4%
Panelists: — Families shown in the episode: — Guest star(s): — Special appearance(s): —
586	"Pleasure to Grow Together" (Korean: —)	20 August 2025	3.6%
Panelists: — Families shown in the episode: Kim Jun-Ho (Kim Eun-Woo & Kim Jeong-Woo); Guest star(s): Jang Suwon Special appearance(s): —
587	"Your Shining Afternoon" (Korean: —)	27 August 2025	3.6%
Panelists: — Families shown in the episode: — Guest star(s): — Special appearance(s): —
588	"Peekaboo ~ My baby!" (Korean: —)	3 September 2025	3.8%
Panelists: — Families shown in the episode: — Guest star(s): — Special appearance(s): —
589	"Our Wonderful Day" (Korean: 우리들의 원더풀데이)	10 September 2025	3.3%
Panelists: — Families shown in the episode: — Guest star(s): — Special appearance(s): —
590	"Holding the End of Summer" (Korean: 여름의 끝을 잡고)	17 September 2025	3.2%
Panelists: — Families shown in the episode: — Guest star(s): — Special appearance(s): —
591	"Thank You Every Day" (Korean: 매일매일 고마워)	24 September 2025	3.7%
Panelists: — Families shown in the episode: Kim Jun-Ho (Kim Eun-Woo & Kim Jeong-Woo); Guest star(s): — Special appearance(s): —
592	"Two Peas in a Pod" (Korean: 닮아도 너무 닮았다)	1 October 2025	3.1%
Panelists: — Families shown in the episode: — Guest star(s): — Special appearance(s): —
593	"Fall Brimming with Joy" (Korean: 행복이 차오르는 가을)	15 October 2025	3.6%
Panelists: — Families shown in the episode: — Guest star(s): — Special appearance(s): —
594	"Uncle Jinttobaegi is Here" (Korean: —)	22 October 2025	3.3%
Panelists: — Families shown in the episode: Kim Jun-Ho (Kim Eun-Woo & Kim Jeong-Woo); Guest star(s): Lee Chan-Won Special appearance(s): —
595	"A Super Challenge to Grow With You!" (Korean: —)	29 October 2025	2.9%
Panelists: — Families shown in the episode: — Guest star(s): — Special appearance(s): —
596	"Experience the Life of a Parent" (Korean: 체험 육아 삶의 현장)	5 November 2025	2.4%
Panelists: — Families shown in the episode: Kim Jun-Ho (Kim Eun-Woo & Kim Jeong-Woo); Guest star(s): — Special appearance(s): —
597	"Your Existence Itself is a Gift" (Korean: 존재 자체가 선물이야)	12 November 2025	3.4%
Panelists: — Families shown in the episode: Kim Jun-Ho (Kim Eun-Woo & Kim Jeong-Woo); Guest star(s): — Special appearance(s): —
598	"Run, Superman Family!" (Korean: —)	26 November 2025	3.0%
Panelists: — Families shown in the episode: — Guest star(s): — Special appearance(s): —
599	"Experience Is What Raises a Child" (Korean: 경험이 아이를 키운다)	3 December 2025	2.7%
Panelists: — Families shown in the episode: Kim Jun-Ho (Kim Eun-Woo & Kim Jeong-Woo); Guest star(s): Kang Ji-Young Special appearance(s): —
600	"Your 600th Growth Diary" (Korean: —)	10 December 2025	2.9%
Panelists: — Families shown in the episode: Kim Jun-Ho (Kim Eun-Woo & Kim Jeong-Woo); Guest star(s): — Special appearance(s): —
601	"You Were Impressed" (Korean: —)	17 December 2025	3.1%
Panelists: — Families shown in the episode: Kim Jun-Ho (Kim Eun-Woo & Kim Jeong-Woo); Guest star(s): — Special appearance(s): —
602	"Christmas Presents have Arrived!" (Korean: —)	24 December 2025	2.8%
Panelists: — Families shown in the episode: — Guest star(s): Song Jin-Woo Special appearance(s): —

== 2026 ==
No.	Title	Original release date	Rating
603	"Being With You Feels Like a Dream" (Korean: 끔만 같아 너와 함께라)	7 January 2026	2.9%
Panelists: — Families shown in the episode: Kim Jun-ho (Kim Eun-woo & Kim Jung-woo); Guest star(s): — Special appearance(s): —
604	"The Birth of Visual Twins" (Korean: 비주얼 쌍둥이의 탄생)	14 January 2026	3.4%
Panelists: — Families shown in the episode: Guest star(s): Kim Jae-Joong Special appearance(s): —
605	"What Brings You to my House?" (Korean: 우리 집에 왜 왔니?)	21 January 2026	3.1%
Panelists: — Families shown in the episode: Kim Jun-ho (Kim Eun-woo & Kim Jung-woo); Guest star(s): — Special appearance(s): —
606	"Princess! Dad Will Protect You!" (Korean: —)	28 January 2026	3.8%
Panelists: — Families shown in the episode: Guest star(s): — Special appearance(s): —
607	"Legendary Grandpa's Parenting Day" (Korean: —)	4 February 2026	3.8%
Panelists: — Families shown in the episode: Guest star(s): Jung Hoo Lee Special appearance(s): —
608	"Generous Inspiration" (Korean: —)	11 February 2026	3.2%
Panelists: — Families shown in the episode: Kim Jun-ho (Kim Eun-woo & Kim Jung-woo); Guest star(s): — Special appearance(s): —

== Notes ==
^Note 1: Episodes were not aired on 20 and 27 April due to the Sewol Ferry tragedy in South Korea.
^Note 2: Episode 49 was not broadcast on 19 October 2014, due to the live broadcast of the "2014 Professional Baseball Semi-Playoffs" games.
^Note 3: Episode broadcasts from 17 September to 24 September were replaced with special episodes due to KBS' strike.
^Note 4: Episode broadcasts from 19 November to 24 December were replaced with special episodes due to KBS' continued strike earlier in the year.
^Note 5: Episode 213 was not broadcast on 11 February 2018, due to KBS' coverage of the 2018 Winter Olympics in Pyeongchang.
