= List of Zerobaseone live performances =

Zerobaseone live performances
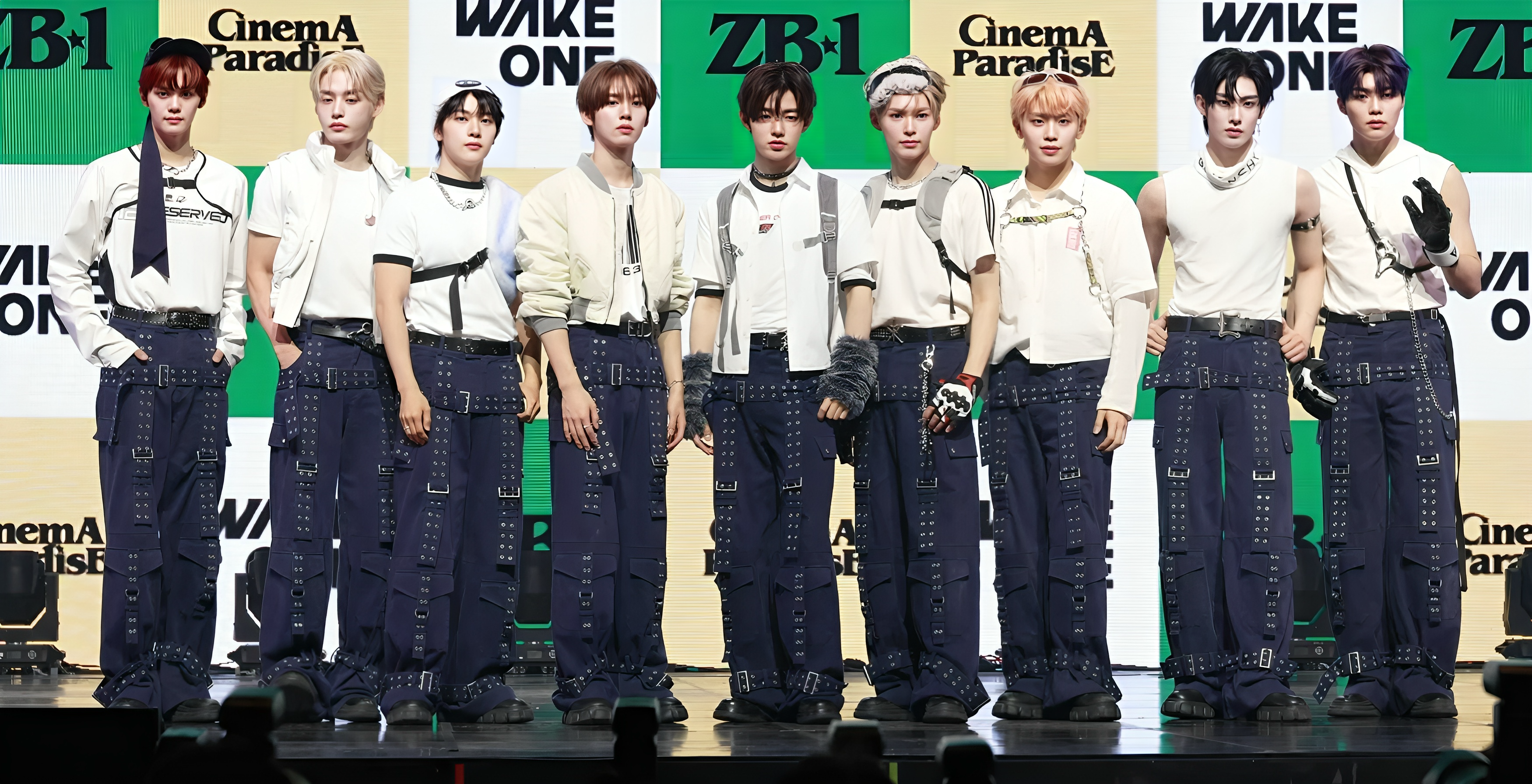
- Zerobaseone at Cinema Paradise showcase in August 2024
- Concert tours: 2
- Fan concerts: 3
- Showcases: 1

The following is a comprehensive list of South Korean boy band Zerobaseone's live performances. The group has performed on two concert tours, three fan concerts, as well as numerous music festivals and live performances.

== Concert tours ==
Title	Date(s)	Associated album(s)	Location	Shows	Setlist	Attendance	Ref.
Timeless World	September 20 – December 5, 2024	Youth in the Shade; Melting Point; You Had Me at Hello; Cinema Paradise	Asia	14	Setlist: 1. "Solar Power"; 2. "Road Movie"; 3. "Take My Hand"; 4. "New Kidz on the Block"; 5. "Crush"; 6. "In Bloom"; 7. "Insomnia"; 8. "Good Night"; 9. "Always" (Zhang Hao solo); 10. "Over Me" (Ricky, Kim Ji-woong, Seok Matthew, Park Gun-wook); 11. "Switch" (Kim Tae-rae, Sung Han-bin, Kim Gyu-vin, Han Yu-jin); 12. "En Garde"; 13. "Say My Name"; 14. "Here I Am" (Remix ver.); 15. "Dear Eclipse"; 16. "Hot Summer" (Remix ver.); 17. "Sweat"; 18. "Kidz Zone"; 19. "Feel the Pop"; 20. "Good So Bad (Long ver.)" 21. "And I"; 22. "Sunday Ride"; 23. "Yura Yura" (Korean ver.); 24. "Hello" (encore)	140,000	
Here & Now Tour	October 3, 2025 – March 15, 2026	Never Say Never; Blue Paradise; Prezent; Cinema Paradise; You Had Me at Hello; Melting Point; Youth in the Shade; Yura Yura; Here I Am	Asia	17	Setlist (Note: The setlist listed here is from the Seoul shows only.): 1. "Iconik" / "Here I Am" (Encore); 2. "Road Movie" / "Take My Hand" (Encore); 3. "Slam Dunk" / "Crush" (Encore); 4. "Good So Bad" / "Sweat" (Encore); 5. "Sweat" / "Kill the Romeo" (Encore); 6. "Lovesick Game" / "Roses" (Encore); 7. "Dear Eclipse" / "Insomnia" (Encore); 8. "Devil Game" / "Goosebumps" (Encore); 9. "Crush" / "Good So Bad" (Encore); 10. "Long Way Back" (Kim Ji-woong, Zhang Hao, Kim Tae-rae, Ricky) / "Feel the Pop" (Encore); 11. "Extra" (Sung Han-bin, Seok Matthew, Kim Gyu-vin, Park Gun-wook, Han Yu-jin) / "Out of Love" (Kim Ji-woong, Zhang Hao, Kim Gyu-vin) (Encore); 12. "Kill the Romeo" / "Step Back" (Ricky, Park Gun-wook, Han Yu-jin) (Encore); 13. "New Kidz on the Block" / "Cruel" (Sung Han-bin, Seok Matthew, Kim Tae-rae) (Encore); 14. "Kids Zone" / "Doctor! Doctor!" (Encore); 15. "Goosebumps" / "Lovesick Game" (Encore); 16. "Dumb" / "Devil Game" (Encore); 17. "I Know U Know" / "Melting Point" (Encore); 18. "Our Season" / "Now or Never" (Encore); 19. "Here I Am" / "Yura Yura" (Encore); 20. "Star Eyes" / "Lovepocalypse" (Encore); 21. "In Bloom" / "Iconik" (Encore); 22. "Yura Yura" / "Blue" (Encore); 23. "Now or Never" / "In Bloom" (Encore); 24. "Blue" / "Not Alone" (Encore); 25. "Running to Future" (Encore)		

== Fan concerts ==
Title	Date	Associated album(s)	Location	Venue	Shows	Setlist	Attendance	Ref.
2023 Zerobaseone Fancon	August 15, 2023	Youth in the Shade	Seoul, South Korea	Gocheok Sky Dome	1	Setlist: 1. "Back to Zerobase"; 2. "New Kidz on the Block"; 3. "Say My Name"; 4. "And I"; 5. "Here I Am"; 6. "Jelly Pop" (Remix ver.); 7. "Hot Summer"; 8. "In Bloom"; 9. "Our Season"	18,000	
2024 Zerobaseone Fancon in Japan	March 23–24, 2024 (Note: On March 24, two shows were held within the day, first beginning at 12:30 (JST), followed by a second at 19:00 (JST).)	Youth in the Shade; Melting Point	Yokohama, Japan	K-Arena Yokohama	3	Setlist: 1. "In Bloom" (Japanese ver.); 2. "Take My Hand"; 3. "Crush" (Japanese ver.); 4. "New Kidz on the Block"; 5. "Melting Point"; 6. "Kidz Zone"; 7. "I Love..." (cover); 8. "Yura Yura"; 9. "Here I Am"; 10. "Jelly Pop"; 11. "Our Season"	53,000	
2025 Zerobaseone Fancon Blue Mansion	April 18–20, 2025	Blue Paradise	Seoul, South Korea	KSPO Dome	3	Setlist: 1. "Blue"; 2. "In Bloom"; 3. "Only One Story" (Korean ver.); 4. "Good So Bad"; 5. "Doctor! Doctor!"; 6. "Cruel"; 7. "Out of Love"; 8. "Step Back"; 9. "Checkmate"; 10. "Crush"; 11. "Kill the Romeo"; 12. "Devil Game"; 13. "Melting Point"; 14. "The Sea" (Zerobaseone remake); 15. "Eternity"		

== Showcases ==
Title	Date	Associated album(s)	Location	Venue	Setlist	Attendance	Ref.
Zerobaseone Debut Show: In Bloom	July 10, 2023	Youth in the Shade	Seoul, South Korea	YES24 Live Hall	setlist: 1. Back to Zerobase; 2. New Kidz on the Block; 3. Hot Summer (Zerobaseone ver.); 4. In Bloom; 5. Say My Name (Zerobaseone ver.)	—	

== Music festivals and joint concerts ==
Title	Date	Location	Performed song(s)	Ref.
KCON Japan 2023	May 14, 2023	Chiba, Japan	"Here I Am"; "Say My Name"	
2023 Ulsan Summer Festival	August 7, 2023	Ulsan, South Korea	"In Bloom"; "New Kidz on the Block"	
2023 Saemanguem World Scout Jamboree: K-Pop Super Live	August 11, 2023 (Note: The performance was originally scheduled to take place on August 6 in Saemangeum but the schedule was postponed and the location changed due to the occurrence of heatstroke patients and safety issues.)	Seoul, South Korea	"In Bloom"; "New Kidz on the Block"	
KCON LA 2023	August 19, 2023	Los Angeles, United States	"Here I Am"; "In Bloom"; "New Kidz on the Block"	
Hana Playlist Concert	September 16, 2023	Seoul, South Korea	"In Bloom"; "Hot Summer"; "And I"; "New Kidz on the Block"	
2023 K-Pop Nation	September 23, 2023	Warsaw, Poland	"In Bloom"; "And I"; "Say My Name"; "Hot Summer"; "New Kidz on the Block"	
Busan One Asia Festival 2023	October 21, 2023	Busan, South Korea	"In Bloom"; "And I"; "New Kidz on the Block"	
2023 K-Link Festival	December 10, 2023	Seoul, South Korea	"Crush"; "Melting Point"; "And I"; "In Bloom"	
2023 Music Bank Global Festivals	December 15, 2023	Seoul, South Korea	"Open the Gate" (Sung Han-bin and Park Gun-wook); "Growl" (Sung Han-bin, Seok Matthew, Ricky, Park Gun-wook, Han Yu-jin); "Boy in Luv" (Kim Ji-woong, Zhang Hao, Kim Tae-rae, Kim Gyu-vin); "Crush"	
Sharing & Together Concert	January 12, 2024	Seoul, South Korea	"In Bloom"; "Melting Point"; " Crush"	
KCON Hong Kong 2024	March 31, 2024	Hong Kong, China	"In Bloom"; "Crush"; "Melting Point"; "Energetic"	
Golden Wave in Taiwan	April 13, 2024	Kaohsiung, Taiwan	"In Bloom"; "Crush"; "New Kidz on the Block"; "Miss You 3000" (Zhang Hao, Kim Tae-rae, Ricky)	
2024 Seoul Festa	May 1, 2024	Seoul, South Korea	"Sweat"; "In Bloom"; "Crush"	
KCON Japan 2024	May 11–12, 2024	Chiba, Japan	"Sweat"; "Yura Yura"; "Melting Point"; "More Than Enough" (Kim Tae-rae)	
SBS Mega Concert	May 19, 2024	Incheon, South Korea	"Feel the Pop"; "Sweat"; "In Bloom"	
K-Wave Concert Inkigayo	June 2, 2024	Incheon, South Korea	"Feel the Pop"; "Sweat"	
Busan One Asia Festival 2024	June 8, 2024	Busan, South Korea	"Feel the Pop"; "Sweat"; "Melting Point"; "In Bloom"	
SBS Gayo Daejeon: Summer 2024	July 21, 2024	Incheon, South Korea	"Sunday Ride"; Sweat"; "Prince of the Sea" (Kim Tae-rae and Park Gun-wook	
KCON LA 2024	July 26 & 28, 2024	Los Angeles, United States	"In Bloom"; "Feel the Pop"; "Sunday Ride"; "Kidz Zone"; "Ddu-Du Ddu-Du"; "Crush"; "Sweat"	
2024 4Seidon Music Festival	August 3, 2024	Busan, South Korea	"New Kidz on the Block"; "Sweat"; "Feel the Pop"; "Sunday Ride"; "Kidz Zone"; "In Bloom"	
2024 Ulsan Summer Festival	August 12, 2024	Ulsan, South Korea	"Feel the Pop"; "Sunday Ride"; "Sweat"	
Summer Sonic 2024	August 17–18, 2024	Chiba, Japan	"New Kidz on the Block"; "In Bloom"; "And I"; "Sunday Ride"; "Say My Name"; "Kidz Zone"; "Sweat"; "Feel the Pop"; "Yura Yura"	
Krazy Super Concert 2024	September 14–15, 2024	Long Beach, United States	"Good So Bad"; "Kill the Romeo"; "Sunday Ride"; "Feel the Pop"; "In Bloom"	
2024 Music Bank Global Festivals in Japan	December 15, 2024	Fukuoka, Japan	"Sweat"; "En Garde"; "Good So Bad"; "Feel the Pop"; "Yura Yura"; "Only One Story"; "Perfume" (Sung Han-bin with Shinyu and Hanjun); "Always" (Zhang Hao)	
Laposta 2025	January 31, 2025	Tokyo, Japan	"Good So Bad"; "Yura Yura"; "Only One Story"; "Now or Never"	
The Performance 2025	March 28, 2025	Yokohama, Japan	"En Garde"; "Devil Game"; "Dear Eclipse"; "Kill the Romeo"; "Doctor! Doctor!"; "And I"; "Crush" (Japanese ver.); "In Bloom' (Japanese ver.); "Feel the Pop" (Japanese ver.); "Yura Yura"; "Now or Never"; "Blue" (Japanese ver.); "Only One Story"	
KCON Japan 2025	May 9, 2025	Tokyo, Japan	"Blue"; "Devil Game"; "Now or Never"; "Only One Story"; "Yura Yura"	
KCON Japan 2025	May 11, 2025	Tokyo, Japan	"Back Packer" (Matthew and Gunwook); "Blue"; "Devil Game"; "Now or Never"; "Good So Bad" (Festival ver.)	

== Awards shows ==
Title	Date	Location	Performed song(s)	Ref.
2023 K-Global Heart Dream Awards	August 10, 2023	Seoul, South Korea	"New Kidz on the Block"; "In Bloom"	
2023 The Fact Music Awards	October 10, 2023	Incheon, South Korea	"In Bloom"	
2023 MAMA Awards	November 28–29, 2023	Tokyo, Japan	"Here I Am" (String ver.; Zhang Hao); "Endless Rain" (Han Yu-jin with all performers); "In Bloom"; "Take my hand"; "Crush"	
2023 Melon Music Awards	December 2, 2023	Incheon, South Korea	"In Bloom"; "Crush"	
8th Asia Artist Awards	December 14, 2023	Bulacan, Philippines	"In Bloom"; "Crush"	
33rd Seoul Music Awards	January 2, 2024	Bangkok, Thailand	"In Bloom"; "Crush"	
38th Golden Disc Awards	January 6, 2024	Jakarta, Indonesia	"In Bloom"; "Our Season"; "Through the Night" (Zhang Hao, Sung Han-bin, and Kim Tae-rae)	
13th Circle Chart Music Awards	January 10, 2024	Busan, South Korea	"New Kidz on the Block"; "Crush"	
31st Hanteo Music Awards	February 18, 2024	Seoul, South Korea	"In Bloom"; "Crush"	
Tencent Music Entertainment Awards 2024	July 20, 2024	Macau	"In Bloom"; "Crush"; "Sweat"; "Feel the Pop"	
51st Korea Broadcasting Prizes	September 1, 2024	Seoul, South Korea	"Good So Bad"	
Seoul International Drama Awards 2024	September 25, 2024	Seoul, South Korea	"Good So Bad"	
2024 Korea Grand Music Awards	November 16, 2024	Incheon, South Korea	"Insomnia"; "Sunday Ride"; "Good So Bad"	
2024 MAMA Awards	November 22–23, 2024	Osaka, Japan	"Left Hander" (Kim Tae-rae and Han Yu-jin with Beomgyu, Huening Kai, and Jay); "Road Movie"; "Kill the Romeo"; "Good So Bad"	
9th Asia Artist Awards	December 27, 2024	Nonthaburi, Thailand	"Dear Eclipse"; "Good So Bad"; "Sudden Shower" (Kim Tae-rae); "Run Run"	
39th Golden Disc Awards	January 7, 2025 (Note: It was originally scheduled to be broadcast on January 5, 2024, but as a national mourning period was declared due to the Jeju Air Flight 2216 runway overrun accident, the live broadcast on January 5 was canceled and later broadcast on January 7. Recording took place on January 5 as originally planned.)	Fukuoka, Japan	"Good So Bad"; "Feel the Pop"	
1st D Awards	February 22, 2025	Seoul, South Korea	"Doctor! Doctor!"; "Good So Bad"	
34th Seoul Music Awards	June 22, 2025	Incheon, South Korea	"Devil Game"; "Blue"	
Asia Star Entertainer Awards 2025	May 30, 2025	Tokyo, Japan	"Good So Bad"; "Devil Game"	
2025 MAMA Awards	November 29, 2025	Hong Kong, China	TBA	

== Television shows and specials ==
Title	Date	Location	Performed song(s)	Ref.
SBS Inkigayo Live in Tokyo	October 3, 2023	Tokyo, Japan	"Spring Day"; "Jelly Pop"; "In Bloom"; "And I"; "New Kidz on the Block"; "Here I Am"	
M Countdown in France	October 15, 2023	Paris, France	"In Bloom"; "Here I Am"; "New Kidz on the Block"	
2023 SBS Gayo Daejeon: Switch On	December 25, 2023	Incheon, South Korea	"Crush"; "Jingle Bell" (Sung Han-bin with Taesan and Anton); "Couple"; "Miracle" (with BoyNextDoor, Riize, and &Team)	
2023 MBC Gayo Daejejeon: Dream Record	December 31, 2023	Seoul, South Korea	"Fry's Dream"; "In Bloom"; "Crush"	
Music Bank in Belgium	April 20, 2024	Antwerp, Belgium	"In Bloom"; "Crush"; "Here I Am"; "New Kidz on the Block"; "Ddu-Du Ddu-Du"; "Rewrite the Stars" (Zhang Hao and Kim Tae-rae with Park Bo-gum and Sohee)	
ENA K-Pop Chart Show	May 29, 2024	South Korea	"Our Season"; "Sweat"; "Feel the Pop"; "Hello"	
Show! Music Core in Japan	June 29, 2024	Saitama, Japan	"Feel the Pop"	
SBS Inkigayo Live in Tokyo	October 13, 2024	Tokyo, Japan	"Good So Bad"; "Kill the Romeo"; "In Bloom"; "Feel the Pop"; "Yura Yura"	
2024 SBS Gayo Daejeon: Merry Music	December 25, 2024	Incheon, South Korea	"Road Movie"; "Good So Bad"; "Love Me Right" (Han Yu-jin with Eunhak, Jihoon, Kyeongmin, Ryo, and Sakuya); "Shoot Out" (Kim Ji-woong and Park Gun-wook)	
2024 MBC Gayo Daejejeon: Wannabe	January 29–30, 2025 (Note: It was originally scheduled to be broadcast on December 31, 2024, but as a national mourning period was declared due to the Jeju Air Flight 2216 runway departure accident, the live broadcast on December 31 was cancelled and the show was recorded and broadcast later in January. The recording took place on December 29 and 31 as originally planned.)	Ilsan and Seoul, South Korea	"Mr.Mr."; "No. 1" (with BoyNextDoor); "Time of Our Life" (Zhang Hao with Taesan, Shinyu, and Dohoon); "Yura Yura" (Korean ver.); "Good So Bad"	

== Other performances ==
Title	Date	Location	Performed song(s)	Ref.
17th Green Ribbon Marathon Festival	September 9, 2023	Seoul, South Korea	"In Bloom"; "New Kidz on the Block"; "And I"	
2023 Kim Jae-hwan Concert Not Alone	December 16, 2023	Seoul, South Korea	"Crush"; "Melting Point"	
Gangwon 2024 K-Culture Festival	January 28, 2024	Gangwon, South Korea	"In Bloom"; "Crush"; "New Kidz on the Block"; "Melting Point"	
Global Spin Live	July 25, 2024	Los Angeles, United States	"In Bloom"; "Feel the Pop"	
"I Love Yonsei" Festival (Note: Event to commemorate the 140th anniversary of the founding of Yonsei University.)	June 8, 2025	Seoul, South Korea	"Here I Am"; "Sea" (ZB1 Remake); "Blue"; "Until the End of the Sky" (Yonsei cheer song)	
