= Zerobaseone discography =

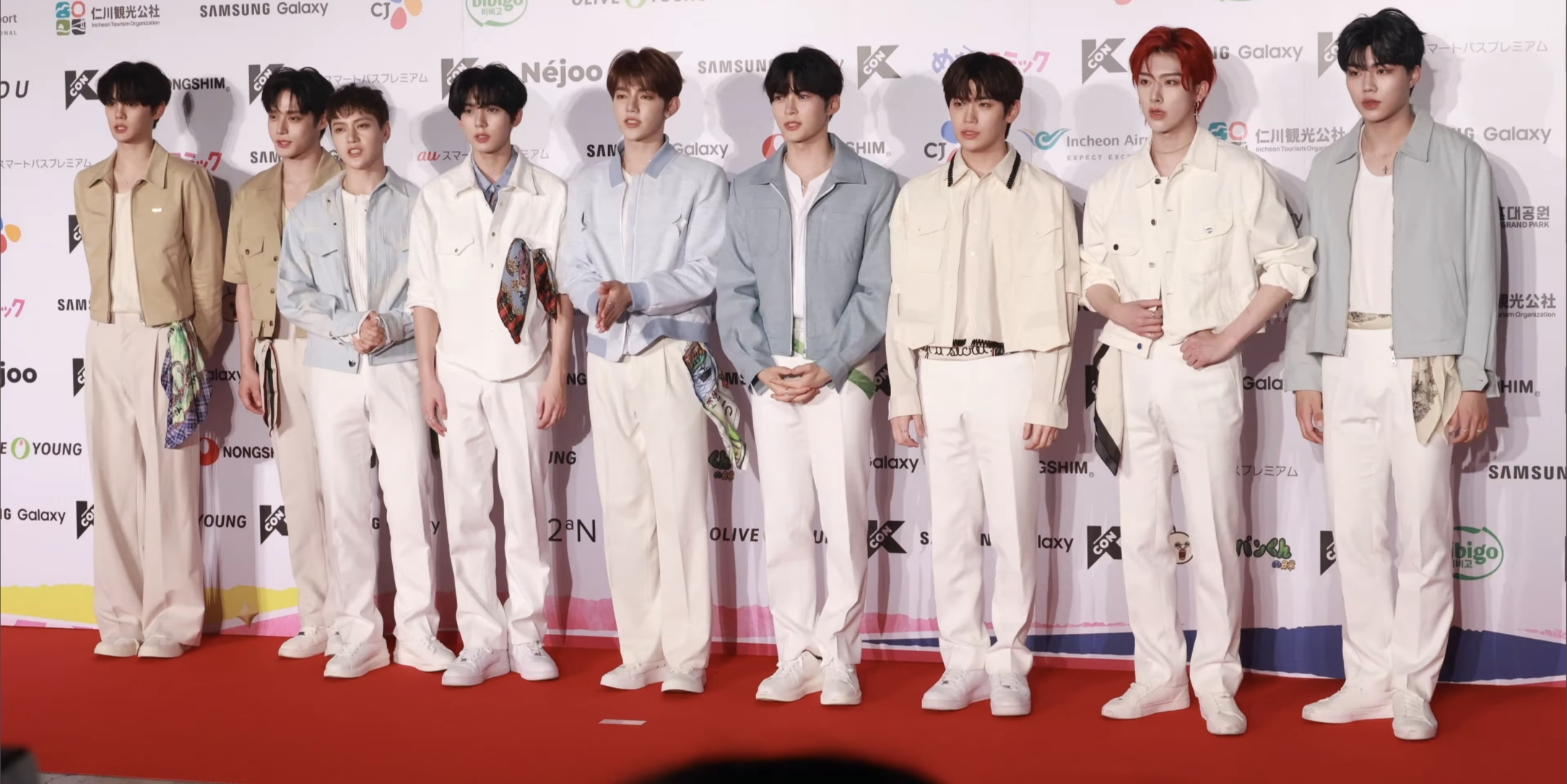
- Zerobaseone at the red carpet of KCON Japan 2024.
- Studio albums: 1
- EPs: 9
- Singles: 16
- Single album: 1
- Soundtracks: 4

South Korean boy group Zerobaseone has released one studio album, nine extended plays, one single album, 16 singles, (Note: Excluding "Only One Story") and three soundtracks. As of November 2025, Zerobaseone has sold over 10.3 million combined album copies.

The group made their debut in 2023 under WakeOne with the extended play Youth in the Shade, which sold approximately 2.2 million copies worldwide and received a 2× million certification in South Korea. The group's Japanese debut single, "Yura Yura (Unmei no Hana)", released in 2024 under Lapone Entertainment, peaked at number one on the Oricon Singles Chart and received a 2× platinum certification in Japan, with approximately 400,000 copies sold.

== Studio albums ==
List of studio albums, showing selected details, selected chart positions, and sales
Title	Details	Peak chart positions				Sales	Certifications
Title	Details	KOR	JPN	JPN Hot	US	Sales	Certifications
Never Say Never	Released: September 1, 2025; Label: WakeOne; Formats: CD, digital download, streaming	1	2	7	23	KOR: 1,575,826; JPN: 135,607	KMCA: Million

== Extended plays ==
=== Korean extended plays ===
List of Korean extended plays, showing selected details, selected chart positions, sales figures, and certifications
Title	Details	Peak chart positions								Sales	Certifications
Title	Details	KOR	BEL (FL)	CRO Intl.	HUN Phy.	JPN	JPN Hot	SWE Phy.	US	Sales	Certifications
Youth in the Shade	Released: July 10, 2023; Label: WakeOne; Formats: CD, digital download, streaming	1	114	—	27	2	12	4	—	WW: 2,200,000; KOR: 2,037,790; JPN: 105,682 (Note: Total sales in Japan for Youth in the Shade: Physical: 104,670; Digital: 1,012)	KMCA: 2× Million
Melting Point	Released: November 6, 2023; Label: WakeOne; Formats: CD, digital download, streaming	2	85	—	40	2	31	19	—	KOR: 1,863,416; JPN: 74,153 (Note: Total sales in Japan for Melting Point: Physical: 73,641; Digital: 512)	KMCA: Million
You Had Me at Hello	Released: May 13, 2024; Label: WakeOne; Formats: CD, digital download, streaming	1	80	22	—	1	23	—	—	KOR: 1,327,891; JPN: 82,946	KMCA: 3× Platinum; KMCA: Platinum (Poca)
Cinema Paradise	Released: August 26, 2024; Label: WakeOne; Formats: CD, digital download, streaming	1	174	—	—	4	70	—	—	WW: 1,200,000; KOR: 1,166,261; JPN: 90,748	KMCA: Million
Blue Paradise	Released: February 24, 2025; Label: WakeOne; Formats: CD, digital download, streaming	1	—	11	—	1	38	—	28	KOR: 1,322,137; JPN: 100,987	KMCA: Million
Ascend-	Released: May 18, 2026; Label: WakeOne; Formats: CD, LP, digital download, streaming	2	156	—	—	3	5	—	—	KOR: 524,653; JPN: 43,506	
"—" denotes releases that did not chart or were not released in that region.

=== Japanese extended plays ===
List of Japanese extended plays, showing selected details, selected chart positions, and sales figures
Title	Details	Peak chart positions		Sales	Certifications
Title	Details	JPN	JPN Hot	Sales	Certifications
Prezent	Released: January 29, 2025; Label: WakeOne, Lapone, Ariola Japan; Formats: CD, digital download, streaming	1	1	JPN: 316,116 (Note: Total sales in Japan for Prezent: Physical: 315,830; Digital: 286)	RIAJ: Platinum (phy.)
Iconik	Released: October 29, 2025; Label: WakeOne, Lapone, Ariola Japan; Formats: CD, digital download, streaming	2	2	JPN: 203,171	RIAJ: Platinum (phy.)
KaikiLove	Released: August 19, 2026; Label: WakeOne, Lapone, Ariola Japan; Formats: CD, digital download, streaming	1	1	JPN: 90,640	RIAJ: Gold (phy.)

== Single albums ==
List of single albums, showing selected details, selected chart positions and sales.
Title	Details	Peak chart positions		Sales
Title	Details	KOR	JPN	Sales
Re-Flow	Released: February 2, 2026; Label: WakeOne; Formats: CD, digital download, streaming	2	4	KOR: 89,830; JPN: 20,564

== Singles ==
=== Korean singles ===
List of Korean singles, showing year released, selected chart positions and name of the album
Title	Year	Peak chart positions								Album
Title	Year	KOR	KOR Songs	JPN Cmb.	JPN Hot	NZ Hot	SGP Reg.	UK Sales	WW	Album
"In Bloom"	2023	38	7	23	22	29	26	—	182	Youth in the Shade
"Crush"	2023	88	24	— (Note: "Crush" did not enter the Oricon Combined Singles Chart, but peaked at number 44 on the Streaming Chart.)	65	—	—	—	—	Melting Point
"Sweat"	2024	— (Note: "Sweat" did not enter the Circle Digital Chart, but peaked at number 8 and 99 on the Circle Download Chart and the Circle BGM Chart, respectively.)	—	—	— (Note: "Sweat" did not enter the Billboard Japan Hot 100, but peaked at number 73 on the Download Songs.)	—	—	—	—	You Had Me at Hello
"Feel the Pop"	2024	82	—	—	62	—	—	89	—	You Had Me at Hello
"Good So Bad"	2024	39	19	50	39	—	—	—	—	Cinema Paradise
"Doctor! Doctor!"	2025	107	—	—	— (Note: "Doctor! Doctor! did not enter the Billboard Japan Hot 100, but it peaked at number 12 on the Hot Shot Songs.)	—	—	—	—	Blue Paradise
"Blue"	2025	58	—	— (Note: "Blue" did not enter the Oricon Combined Singles Chart, but peaked at number 43 on the Streaming Chart.)	88	—	—	—	—	Blue Paradise
"Slam Dunk"	2025	— (Note: "Slam Dunk" did not enter the Circle Digital Chart, but peaked at number 29 on the Circle Download Chart.)	—	—	— (Note: "Slam Dunk" did not enter the Billboard Japan Hot 100, but it peaked at number 11 on the Hot Shot Songs and number 78 on the Download Songs, respectively.)	—	—	—	—	Never Say Never
"Iconik"	2025	14	—	32	45	—	—	—	—	Never Say Never
"Running to Future"	2026	— (Note: "Roses" did not enter the Circle Digital Chart, but peaked at 52 on the Circle Download Chart.)	—	—	—	—	—	—	—	Re-Flow
"Lovepocalypse"	2026	61	—	—	— (Note: "Lovepocalypse" did not enter the Billboard Japan Hot 100, but it peaked at number 5 on the Hot Shot Songs.)	—	—	—	—	Re-Flow
"Top 5"	2026	15	—	49	73	—	—	—	—	Ascend-
"—" denotes a recording that did not chart or was not released in that region.

=== Japanese singles ===
List of Japanese singles, showing year released, selected chart positions, sales figures, certifications and name of the album
Title	Year	Peak chart positions			Sales	Certifications	Album
Title	Year	JPN	JPN Hot	KOR DL	Sales	Certifications	Album
"Yura Yura (Unmei no Hana)"	2024	1	3	167	JPN: 396,573 (phy.)	RIAJ: 2× Platinum (phy.)	Non-album single
"Only One Story" (Note: "Only One Story" was released as an opening theme for Pokémon Horizons – The Search for Laqua.)	2024	— (Note: "Only One Story" did not enter the Oricon Singles Chart as it was not released physically, but peaked at number 33 on the Digital Chart.)	— (Note: "Only One Story" did not enter the Billboard Japan Hot 100, but peaked at number 32 on the Download Songs.)	—	JPN: 1,625 (dig.)	—N/a	Prezent
"Now or Never"	2025	—	— (Note: "Now or Never" did not enter the Billboard Japan Hot 100, but it peaked at number 15 on the Hot Shot Songs.)	178	—N/a	—N/a	Prezent
"Iconik" (Japanese version)	2025	—	—	—	—N/a	—N/a	Iconik
"Existence"	2026	—	94	—	—N/a	—N/a	KaikiLove
"—" denotes a recording that did not chart or was not released in that region.

=== Soundtrack appearances ===
List of soundtracks, showing year released, selected chart positions, and name of the album
Title	Year	Peak chart positions	Album
Title	Year	KOR DL	Album
"Reaching for You" (내일의 너에게 닿기를)	2024	27	Love Next Door OST
"Checkmate" (produced by Czaer)	2024	102	Stage Fighter (STF) Original Vol. 6
"D-Day"	2025	66	Head over Heels OST
"—" denotes a recording that did not chart or was not released in that region.

== Other charted songs ==
List of other charted songs, showing year released, selected chart positions, and name of the album
Title	Year	Peak chart positions		Album
Title	Year	KOR	KOR Songs	Album
"Back to Zerobase"	2023	195	—	Youth in the Shade
"New Kidz on the Block"	2023	140	20	Youth in the Shade
"And I" (우주먼지)	2023	162	25	Youth in the Shade
"Our Season"	2023	180	—	Youth in the Shade
"Always"	2023	— (Note: "Always" did not enter the Circle Digital Chart, but peaked at number 23 on the Circle Download Chart.)	—	Youth in the Shade
"Melting Point"	2023	197	—	Melting Point
"Take My Hand"	2023	— (Note: "Take My Hand" did not enter the Circle Digital Chart, but peaked at number 29 on the Circle Download Chart.)	—	Melting Point
"Kidz Zone"	2023	— (Note: "Kidz Zone" did not enter the Circle Digital Chart, but peaked at number 30 on the Circle Download Chart.)	—	Melting Point
"Good Night"	2023	— (Note: "Good Night" did not enter the Circle Digital Chart, but peaked at number 28 on the Circle Download Chart.)	—	Melting Point
"Solar Power"	2024	— (Note: "Solar Power" did not enter the Circle Digital Chart, but peaked at number 19 on the Circle Download Chart.)	—	You Had Me at Hello
"Dear Eclipse"	2024	— (Note: "Dear Eclipse" did not enter the Circle Digital Chart, but peaked at number 17 on the Circle Download Chart.)	—	You Had Me at Hello
"Sunday Ride"	2024	— (Note: "Sunday Ride" did not enter the Circle Digital Chart, but peaked at number 18 on the Circle Download Chart.)	—	You Had Me at Hello
"Hello"	2024	— (Note: "Hello" did not enter the Circle Digital Chart, but peaked at number 15 and 151 on the Circle Download Chart and the Circle BGM Chart, respectively.)	—	You Had Me at Hello
"Feel the Pop" (Sped Up version)	2024	— (Note: "Feel the Pop" (sped up version) did not enter the Circle Digital Chart, but peaked at number 22 on the Circle Download Chart.)	—	You Had Me at Hello
"Kill the Romeo"	2024	— (Note: "Kill the Romeo" did not enter the Circle Digital Chart, but peaked at 7 and 127 on the Circle Download Chart and Circle BGM Chart, respectively.)	—	Cinema Paradise
"The Sea" (바다; ZB1 remake)	2024	— (Note: "The Sea" did not enter the Circle Digital Chart, but peaked at 8 and 123 on the Circle Download Chart and Circle BGM Chart, respectively.)	—	Cinema Paradise
"Insomnia"	2024	— (Note: "Insomnia" did not enter the Circle Digital Chart, but peaked at 9 and 128 on the Circle Download Chart and Circle BGM Chart, respectively.)	—	Cinema Paradise
"Road Movie"	2024	— (Note: "Road Movie" did not enter the Circle Digital Chart, but peaked at 14 and 127 on the Circle Download Chart and Circle BGM Chart, respectively.)	—	Cinema Paradise
"Eternity"	2024	— (Note: "Eternity" did not enter the Circle Digital Chart, but peaked at 13 and 96 on the Circle Download Chart and Circle BGM Chart, respectively.)	—	Cinema Paradise
"Yura Yura" (Korean version)	2024	— (Note: "Yura Yura" did not enter the Circle Digital Chart, but peaked at 10 and 199 on the Circle Download Chart and Circle BGM Chart, respectively.)	—	Cinema Paradise
"Devil Game"	2025	— (Note: "Devil Game" did not enter the Circle Digital Chart, but peaked at 23 on the Circle Download Chart.)	—	Blue Paradise
"Out of Love"	2025	— (Note: "Out of Love" did not enter the Circle Digital Chart, but peaked at 24 on the Circle Download Chart.)	—	Blue Paradise
"Step Back"	2025	— (Note: "Step Back" did not enter the Circle Digital Chart, but peaked at 28 on the Circle Download Chart.)	—	Blue Paradise
"Cruel"	2025	— (Note: "Cruel" did not enter the Circle Digital Chart, but peaked at 26 on the Circle Download Chart.)	—	Blue Paradise
"Roses"	2026	— (Note: "Roses" did not enter the Circle Digital Chart, but peaked at 61 on the Circle Download Chart.)	—	Re-Flow
"—" denotes a recording that did not chart or was not released in that region.
