= Timeless World =

2024 concert tour by Zerobaseone

- World tour by Zerobaseone
- Seoul promotional poster
- Location: Asia
- Start date: September 20, 2024
- End date: December 5, 2024
- Legs: 1
- No. of shows: 14

Zerobaseone concert chronology
- 2025 Zerobaseone Fancon Blue Mansion; Timeless World; Here & Now Tour

Timeless World was the first Asian tour by South Korean boy band Zerobaseone. The tour began on September 20, 2024, at KSPO Dome, Seoul, South Korea, and concluded December 5, 2024, at K-Arena Yokohama, Yokohama, Japan.

== Background and ticketing ==
Zerobaseone announced their first world tour schedule and venue through their official social media account on April 29, 2024. The world tour title "Timeless World" was officially announced later on July 15, 2024, through the Seoul promotional poster release. According to WakeOne, they were planning to hold a large-scale arena tour to connect with more fans.

The three shows in Seoul were sold out immediately during the first day of ticketing sales opened on August 8. The tour made stops in Singapore, Thailand, Philippines, Indonesia, China, and Japan. Zerobaseone also announced online streaming for the Seoul concert at 19 CGV Cinemas across South Korea.

The band released a concert film titled Zerobaseone The First Tour: Timeless World in Cinema that featured the concerts, rehearsal, and interviews of the band members. The film aired from March 12–16, 2025 in CGV Cinemas through distributor CJ 4DPlex.

== Reception ==
Kim Jin-seok from JTBC News praised the Seoul concert's stage setting for the well utilized extended stage and large LED screens so the fans with farthest seats could enjoy with comfortable view. However, he also expressed regrettable remarks from some Zerobaseone fans who almost led to a safety accident during the encore performance. The Straits Times reported that Zerobaseone succeed in leading the Singapore Indoor Stadium just one year after their debut and added that the band had a promising starts, performing many songs during the running time of approximately 150 minutes. Pan Yan from Lianhe Zaobao praised the members effort to communicate with Singaporean fans in English. HallyuSG expressed that they want to stop the time because of the good quality of the band's performance in Singapore.

== Setlist ==
-This set list is representative of the shows in Seoul on September 20, 21 and 22. It is not intended to represent all shows.

1. Solar Power (Opening backsound)
2. Road Movie
3. Take My Hand
4. New Kidz on the Block
5. Kill the Romeo
6. Crush
7. In Bloom
8. Insomnia
9. Good Night
10. Always (Zhang Hao solo)
11. Over Me (Ricky, Kim Ji-woong, Seok Matthew, Park Gun-wook)
12. Switch (Kim Tae-rae, Sung Han-bin, Kim Gyu-vin, Han Yu-jin)
13. En Garde
14. Say My Name
15. Here I Am (Remix ver.)
16. Dear Eclipse
17. Hot Summer (Remix ver.)
18. Sweat
19. Kidz Zone
20. Feel the Pop
21. Good So Bad (Long ver.)

Encore

22. Our Season (Fan project)
23. Yura Yura (Korean ver.)
24. And I
25. Sunday Ride
26. Hello

Notes

- During the show in Pasay, the group performed a cover of 'Dilaw' by Maki.
- During the show in Jakarta, the group performed a cover of 'Teman Bahagia' by Jaz.
- During the shows in Macau, the group performed a cover of 'Actor' by Joker Xue.
- 'Only One Story' was added to the setlist from November 29 to December 5 in Japan.

== Tour dates ==
List of tour dates, showing location and attendance
Date	City	Country	Venue	Attendance	Ref.
September 20, 2024	Seoul	South Korea	KSPO Dome	27,762	—
September 21, 2024	Seoul	South Korea	KSPO Dome	27,762	—
September 22, 2024	Seoul	South Korea	KSPO Dome	27,762	—
September 28, 2024	Singapore		Singapore Indoor Stadium	8,000	
October 5, 2024	Pak Kret (Note: Promoted as Bangkok.)	Thailand	Impact Challenger Hall 5-6	not specified	
October 12, 2024	Pasay (Note: Promoted as Manila.)	Philippines	SM Mall of Asia Arena	not specified	
October 26, 2024	Banten (Note: Promoted as Jakarta.)	Indonesia	ICE BSD City Hall 5–6	not specified	
November 2, 2024	Macau		Galaxy Arena	20,000	
November 3, 2024	Macau		Galaxy Arena	20,000	
November 29, 2024	Tokoname (Note: Promoted as Aichi.)	Japan	Aichi Sky Expo	60,000	
November 30, 2024	Tokoname	Japan	Aichi Sky Expo	60,000	
December 1, 2024	Tokoname	Japan	Aichi Sky Expo	60,000	
December 4, 2024	Yokohama (Note: Promoted as Kanagawa.)	Japan	K-Arena Yokohama	60,000	
December 5, 2024	Yokohama	Japan	K-Arena Yokohama	60,000	
Total attendance				140,000	
