= Prezent =

- Digital cover

EP by Zerobaseone
- Released: January 29, 2025
- Recorded: 2024
- Genre: J-pop
- Length: 19:52
- Language: Japanese
- Labels: WakeOne; Lapone; Ariola Japan

Zerobaseone chronology
| Cinema Paradise (2024) | Prezent (2025) | Blue Paradise (2025) |

Singles from Prezent
- 1. "Only One Story" Released: October 11, 2024; 2. "Now or Never" Released: January 15, 2025

Prezent is the first Japanese-language extended play (EP) and fifth overall by South Korean boy group Zerobaseone. It was released by WakeOne, Lapone Entertainment and Ariola Japan on January 29, 2025. The EP contains six tracks, including the Japanese versions of the group's 2024 Korean-language singles "Feel the Pop" and "Good So Bad", and the Japanese single "Only One Story", which was previously released by the group as an original soundtrack for Pokémon Horizons: The Series. The EP was commercially successful, peaking at number-one on multiple album charts within Japan including the Oricon Albums Chart.

== Background and release ==
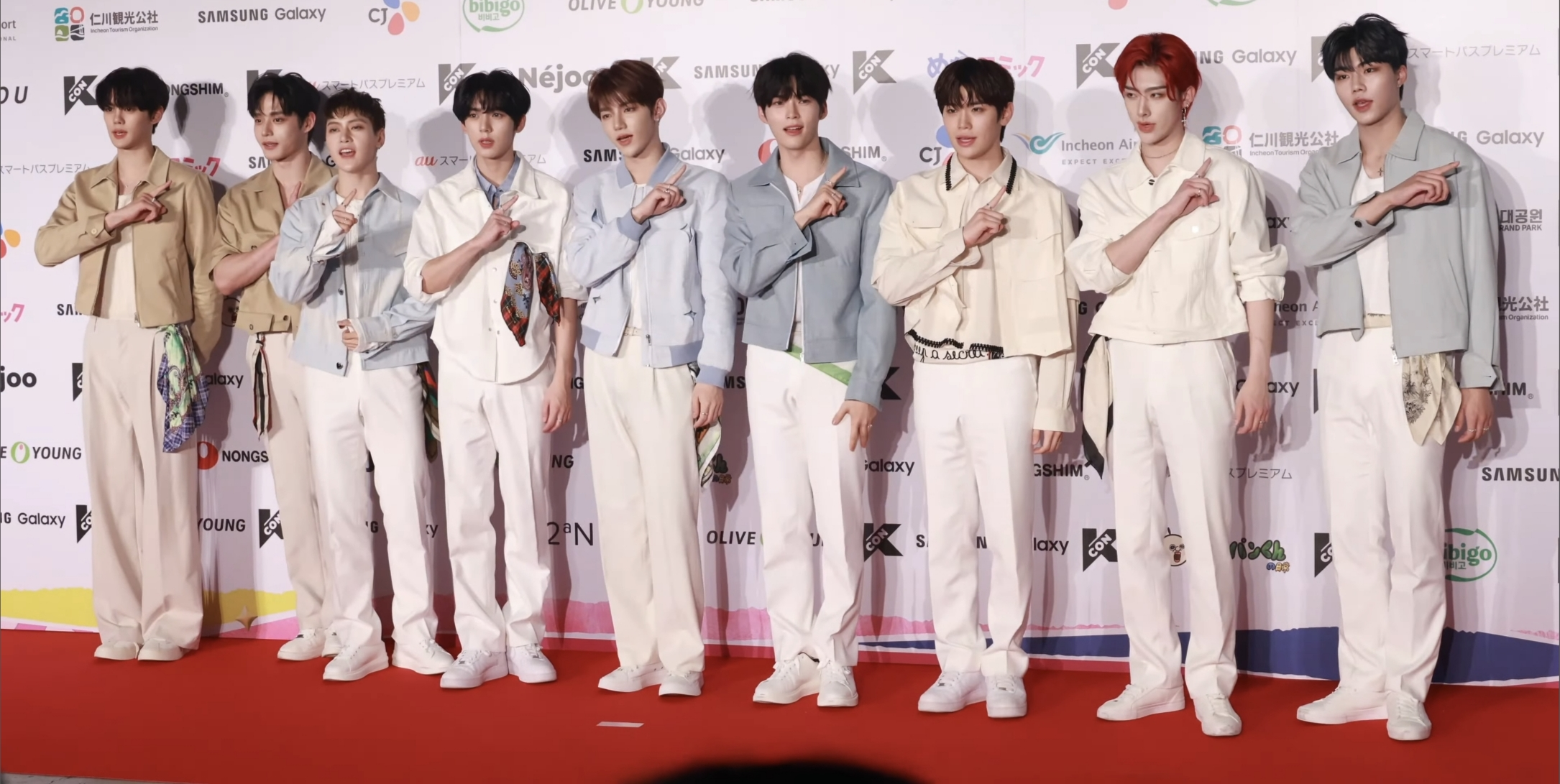
Zerobaseone at KCON Japan 2024

In March 2024, Zerobaseone made their Japanese debut with the single "Yura Yura (Unmei no Hana)". The single was a commercial success, debuting at number one on the Oricon Singles Chart, becoming the first foreign artist to sell over 300,000 copies in the first week with a debut single. The song went on to be certified 2× platinum by the RIAJ for sales of over 500,000 copies. The group also held five sold out fan concerts at Aichi Sky Expo and Yokohama Arena on the Timeless World tour in November and December 2024.

Prezent, Zerobaseone's first Japanese-language EP, was announced on November 11. In the announcement, WakeOne confirmed that the EP would contain six tracks, including the lead track "Now or Never", and "Only One Story", which was previously released in October 2024 to serve as the opening song to Pokémon Horizons: The Series. The EP also included the Japanese-language versions of the group's Korean singles "Good So Bad" and "Feel the Pop". Cover art for the four different editions were revealed on December 17. The EP was released in a standard edition, two first press limited editions, and an anime edition with a cover that depicts the band with animated characters.

In support of the EP, the band released the lead single, "Now or Never", on January 15. The release was accompanied by a music video showing the group's members as college students, dancing in baseball uniforms and under fireworks. Prezent was released on January 29, 2025.

== Composition ==
The EP's lead single, "Now or Never" is a drum and bass influenced track with piano and guitar melodies.

== Commercial performance ==
Prezent debuted at number-one on Japan's Oricon Albums Chart for the week ending February 2, 2025, selling 257,157 copies in its first week. The EP also debuted at number-one on the Billboard Japan Hot Albums chart and the Oricon Combined Albums Chart, becoming the band's second time at the apex of the chart after You Had Me at Hello (2024). The EP recorded sales of 189,646 on its first day, becoming the largest first day sales in the Japan for a "fifth generation" K-pop group.

== Track listing ==
Prezent track listing
| No. | Title | Lyrics | Music | Arrangement | Length |
|---|---|---|---|---|---|
| 1. | "Now or Never" | NullPencil; Kim Yoil; Nogeum; Song U; Hyeli; Mao; Mayu Wakisaka; Flame; Koo Youngwon | Chance Park; Aden K. | Park | 3:22 |
| 2. | "Only One Story" | Tomoki Tamatani; Kushita | Tamatani; Kushita; Sora Tansho | Tansho | 3:40 |
| 3. | "Firework" | Yoon; Nevada; Deepen; Choo Danbi | Avenue 52; Sqvare; Rouno | Rouno | 3:42 |
| 4. | "Hana" | Ladyhood; Na-yun Jeong; Seo Boeui; Riho Okano; Moon Kim | Moon Kim; Seo Ji-eun | Seo Ji-eun | 3:11 |
| 5. | "Feel the Pop" (Japanese version) | Kim Su-ji; Ha Yoon-a; 12h51m; Lee Hyoung-joo; Kim So-ha; David Wilson; Max Schneider; Sean Douglas; Mizui Toutosa; Mion Yano; Ladyhood | David Wilson; Max Schneider; Sean Douglas | Dwilly | 2:57 |
| 6. | "Good So Bad" (Japanese version) | Kenzie; Yano; Haruka Mizuguchi; Riho Okano; Toutosa | Kenzie; Andrew Choi; No2zcat; Jsong | No2zcat | 2:58 |
| Total length: | | | | | 19:52 |

== Charts ==
=== Weekly charts ===
Weekly chart performance
| Chart (2025) | Peak position |
|---|---|
| Japanese Albums (Oricon) | 1 |
| Japanese Combined Albums (Oricon) | 1 |
| Japanese Hot Albums (Billboard Japan) | 1 |

=== Monthly charts ===
Monthly chart performance
| Chart (2025) | Position |
|---|---|
| Japanese Albums (Oricon) | 3 |

=== Year-end charts ===
Year-end chart performance
| Chart (2025) | Position |
|---|---|
| Japanese Albums (Oricon) | 19 |
| Japanese Top Albums Sales (Billboard Japan) | 11 |

== Certifications ==
Certifications
| Region | Certification | Certified units/sales |
|---|---|---|
| Japan (RIAJ) Physical | Platinum | 250,000^{^} |
^{^} Shipments figures based on certification alone.

== Release history ==
Release history
| Region | Date | Format(s) | Label | Ref. |
|---|---|---|---|---|
| Various | January 29, 2025 | Digital download; streaming | WakeOne; Lapone; Ariola Japan | |
| Japan | January 29, 2025 | CD | Ariola Japan | |
