= 13th Circle Chart Music Awards =

2024 South Korean award ceremony

- Official poster
- Date: January 10, 2024
- Venue: Busan Exhibition and Convention Center, Busan
- Country: South Korea
- Presented by: Korea Music Content Association and SPOTV
- Hosted by: Leeteuk; Sieun; Seok Matthew

Highlights
- Most awards: NewJeans (4)
- Website: circlechartmusicawards.com

Television/radio coverage
- Network: SPOTV; STATV

The 13th Circle Chart Music Awards (Korean: 써클차트 뮤직 어워즈 2023) was a award ceremony organized by Circle Chart, held at Busan Exhibition and Convention Center in Busan on January 10, 2024. It recognized the best artists and recordings, primarily based on Circle Music Chart of the year from December 1, 2022, to November 30, 2023. The ceremony was hosted by Leeteuk, Sieun, and Seok Matthew.

It was broadcast live on SPOTV and STATV in South Korea. It was also available to watch live on online platforms Viaje Korea's WishyouTV and 1theK YouTube channel.

== Winners and nominees ==
Winners and nominees are listed in alphabetical order. Winners are listed first and emphasized in bold.

=== Main awards ===
Artist of the Year
Global Streaming	Digital
**(G)I-dle – "Queencard"**; **Ive – "I Am"**; **Jisoo – "Flower"**; **Jungkook – "Seven" (featuring Latto)**; **NewJeans – "Super Shy"**; Aespa – "Spicy"; BTS – "Take Two"; Jimin – "Like Crazy"; Le Sserafim – "Unforgiven" (featuring Nile Rodgers); Seventeen – "Super"	**(G)I-dle – "Queencard"**; **Ive – "I Am"**; **Jungkook – "Seven" (featuring Latto)**; **Le Sserafim – "Unforgiven" (featuring Nile Rodgers)**; **NewJeans – "Ditto"**; Aespa – "Spicy"; Jisoo – "Flower"; Lim Young-woong – "Grain of Sand"; NCT Dream – "Candy"; Seventeen – "Super"
Streaming Unique Listeners	Physical Album
**(G)I-dle – "Queencard"**; **Aespa – "Spicy"**; **Ive – "I Am"**; **Le Sserafim – "Unforgiven" (featuring Nile Rodgers)**; **NewJeans – "Ditto"**; AKMU – "Love Lee"; Jisoo – "Flower"; Jungkook – "Seven" (featuring Latto); NCT Dream – "Candy"; Seventeen – "Super"	**Jungkook – Golden**; **NCT Dream – ISTJ**; **Seventeen – Seventeenth Heaven**; **Stray Kids – 5-Star**; **Tomorrow X Together – The Name Chapter: Freefall**; Aespa – My World; Enhypen – Orange Blood; Ive – I've Mine; V – Layover; Zerobaseone – Youth in the Shade
Rookie of the Year
Global Streaming	Streaming Unique Listeners
**BabyMonster – "Batter Up"**; BoyNextDoor – "But Sometimes"; Kiss of Life – "Shhh"; Riize – "Get a Guitar"; Zerobaseone – "In Bloom"	**Riize – "Get a Guitar"**; BabyMonster – "Batter Up"; BoyNextDoor – "But Sometimes"; Plave – "The 6th Summer"; Zerobaseone – "In Bloom"
Physical Album
**Zerobaseone – Youth in the Shade**; BoyNextDoor – Why..; Evnne – Target: Me; Hwang Young-woong – Fall and yearning; Riize – Get a Guitar

=== Other awards ===
Other Categories	Winner
Digital Album of the Year	NCT Dream – ISTJ
New Artist of the Next Generation	Kiss of Life
New Artist of the Next Generation	NiziU
Genre of the Year – J-pop	imase – "Night Dancer"
Genre of the Year – Ballad	Parc Jae-jung – "Let's Say Goodbye"
Genre of the Year – Trot	Lee Chan-won – "Wish Lanterns"
World K-pop Star	NCT Dream
Music Steady Seller of the Year	NewJeans – "Hype Boy"
Song of the Year in International Pop	Charlie Puth – "Dangerously"
KiT Album of the Year	Seventeen
Retail Album of the Year	Seventeen – FML
MuBeat Global Choice – Male	Lim Young-woong
MuBeat Global Choice – Female	NiziU
V Coloring of the Year	AKMU
New Icon of the Year	Hwasa – "I Love My Body"
New Icon of the Year	STAYC – "Teddy Bear"
Busan is Good Award	AKMU
Busan is Good Award	KyoungSeo
Social Hot Star of the Year	Blackpink
Composer of the Year	250
Lyricist of the Year	Gigi
Visual Director of the Year	Kim Hye-soo
Chorus Performer of the Year	Perrie
Performance Director of the Year	Park So-yeon
Musical Instrument Performer of the Year	Hareem
Viaje Global Popularity Award	Zhang Hao (Zerobaseone)

== Performers ==
Order of the performance, name of the artist(s), and song(s) they performed
Order	Artist(s)	Song performed
1	Eo-Ddae and Mannequeen	Dance performance
2	Kiss of Life	"Bad News" + "Shhh"
3	NiziU	"Heartris"
4	imase	"Night Dancer"
5	Parc Jae-jung	"Let's Say Goodbye"
6	Kyoungseo	"120 BPM" + "Looking for you"
7	Riize	"Get a Guitar" + "Love 119"
8	Zerobaseone	"New Kidz in the Block" + "Crush"
9	Lee Chan-won	"Fate in Time" + "Would you like to come with me"
10	STAYC	"Not Like You" + "Bubble"
11	Hwasa	"I Love My Body" + "Chili"
12	Tomorrow X Together	"Chasing That Feeling" + "Sugar Rush Ride"
13	AKMU	"Dinosaur" + "Nakka" + "Love Lee"
14	NCT Dream	"Boom" + "Broken Melodies" + ISTJ"

== Presenters ==
Order of the presentation, name of the artist(s), and award(s) they presented
Order	Artist(s)	Presented
1	Park Seo-ham; Lee Si-woo	New Artist of the Next Generation
2	Choi Ye-bin and Choo Young-woo	Rookie of the Year
3	Lee Chae-min	Genre of the Year
4	Lee Jun-seung (Note: Vice Mayor of Busan for Administrative Affairs)	Busan is Good Award
5	Hong Jong-hyun	MuBeat Global Choice
5	Hong Jong-hyun	Viaje Global Popularity Award
5	Hong Jong-hyun	World K-POP Star
6	Leeteuk	Artist of the Year (Global Streaming and Unique Listeners)
7	Hanhae	New Icon of the Year
7	Hanhae	V Coloring of the Year
8	KINKY and TED (Eo-Ddae); Funky-Y (Mannequeen)	Performance Director of the Year
8	KINKY and TED (Eo-Ddae); Funky-Y (Mannequeen)	Visual Director of the Year
9	Lee Chan-won	Chorus Performer of the Year
9	Lee Chan-won	Musical Instrument Performer of the Year
10	Seok Matthew	Artist of the Year (Digital)
11	Jinyoung	Artist of the Year (Physical Album)
12	Ahn Bo-hyun	Digital Album of the Year
