= Never Say Never (Zerobaseone album) =

- Digital cover

Studio album by Zerobaseone
- Released: September 1, 2025
- Genres: EDM; hip-hop; pop
- Length: 31:52
- Language: Korean
- Label: WakeOne

Zerobaseone chronology
Blue Paradise (2025)	Never Say Never (2025)	Iconik (2025)

Singles from Never Say Never
- 1. "Slam Dunk" Released: July 23, 2025; 2. "Iconik" Released: September 1, 2025

Never Say Never is the first studio album by South Korean boy band Zerobaseone. It was released on September 1, 2025, by WakeOne and supported by the singles "Slam Dunk", which was released on July 23, and "Iconik", which was released along with the rest of the album.

== Background and release ==
On July 20, 2025, WakeOne Entertainment announced that Zerobaseone would release their first full-length studio album, titled Never Say Never, on September 1. The album follows the group's February 2025 EP, Blue Paradise, and was described by the agency as a "highlight" of the group's journey with their fans, Zerose. The project was preceded by the single "Slam Dunk," which was released on July 23.

On August 12, the group released the tracklist of the album via their official social media channels. It features a total of 10 tracks, including the lead single "Iconik". The music video teasers for Iconik was released on August 28 and 31, respectively.

== Composition ==
Never Say Never features ten tracks that span genres including EDM, hip hop, and pop. The album's central theme focuses on the message that "nothing is impossible", offering encouragement and courage to those pursuing dreams within the constraints of reality. The title track, "Iconik", serves as a representation of the group's journey as artists and conveys a message of self-confidence and the ambition to shine regardless of external evaluation. The track "Slam Dunk" is an EDM and hip hop song designed to evoke the energy of a basketball game, while "Lovesick Game" describes the complexities of a romantic relationship. "Goosebumps" is characterized by an addictive chorus centered on the sensation of being in love, and "Dumb" is an upbeat, hip hop-based pop song with a playful melody. The album also incorporates specialized recordings and unit performances. It includes a Korean-language version of "Now or Never", originally the title track from the group's first Japanese EP, Prezent. The record features two distinct unit songs: "Extra", a high-energy hip-hop dance track featuring members Sung Han-bin, Seok Matthew, Kim Gyu-vin, Park Gun-wook, and Han Yu-jin, and "Long Way Back", a ballad-leaning track performed by Kim Ji-woong, Zhang Hao, Kim Tae-rae, and Ricky that depicts the longing to close the distance in a fading relationship. The album concludes with "Star Eyes", an EDM pop track depicting the group's narrative, and "I Know U Know", a dedicated fan song for their fandom, Zerose. Production for the album involved a wide range of domestic and international producers, with noted songwriter Kenzie contributing to the composition of "Extra", "Long Way Back", and "I Know U Know".

== Commercial performance ==
Upon its release, Never Say Never debuted at number one on the Hanteo Daily Album Chart, selling 1.1 million copies and recording 1.21 million points on the physical record index, becoming the band's sixth consecutive million-selling album. By the end of its first week of availability (September 1–7), the album reached number one on the Hanteo Weekly Physical Album Chart with 1.51 million copies sold, totaling 1.69 million points.

On the Circle Album Chart, the album ranked number one with a total sales of 1,459,415 copies. The International Federation of the Phonographic Industry (IFPI) recognized Never Say Never as the global seventh best-selling album in the Top 20 IFPI Global Album Sales Chart 2025. (Note: The IFPI Global Album Sales Chart ranks albums based on the total number of physical units and full album downloads sold worldwide. To qualify for the chart, a release must contain a minimum of five tracks, excluding remixes or alternative versions of the same track.)

== Track listing ==
Never Say Never track listing
No.	Title	Lyrics	Music	Arrangement	Length
1.	"Iconik"	Rick Bridges; Saint; Kang Eun-jeong; Cho Eun-sol (Jam Factory); Anne Judith Wik; Henrik Heaven	Ronny Svendsen; Adrian Thesen; Heaven; Wik	Svendsen; Pizzapunk	3:13
2.	"Slam Dunk"	JayJay; Perklee; Young Chance; Junny; Wutan; Lee Seu-ran	JayJay; Perklee; Chance; Junny	JayJay; Perklee	2:57
3.	"Lovesick Game"	Kim Win-di (Jam Factory)	Kim Ju-yeong; Jacob Aaron (The Hub)	Kim	3:17
4.	"Goosebumps"	Bay (153/Joombas); Mia (153/Joombas)	Max Levin; Kyle Scherrer; Edwin Honoret	Max & Kyle	2:35
5.	"Dumb"	930 (153/Joombas); Bridge	David Wilson; JBach; Benjmn	Dwilly	2:44
6.	"Now or Never" (Korean version)	_NullPencil_ (Digz, Inc. Group); Kim Yo-il (MUMW); Nogeum (Artiffect); Song U (Inhouse); Hyeli (Inhouse); Mao; Mayu Wakisaka; Flame; Koo Young-won (MUMW); Ai Hyun (153/Joombas); Woo Seung-yeon (153/Joombas)	Chance Park; Aden K.	Park	3:22
7.	"Extra"	Kenzie	Kenzie; Andrew Choi; No2zcat; Jsong	No2zcat; Kenzie	2:55
8.	"Long Way Back"	Kenzie	Kenzie; Erik Lidbom; Choi	Lidbom	3:16
9.	"Star Eyes"	Park So-hee (Inhouse); Woo; Yoon Ye-ji (Artiffect); Bang Hye-hyun; 12h51m (XYXX); Liljune (153/Joombas)	Jake K (Artiffect); 3scape Drm; Andreas Öberg; Rico Greene	K; Drm	4:03
10.	"I Know U Know"	Kenzie	Kenzie; Matthew Tishler	Tishler; Kenzie	3:30
Total length:					31:52

== Charts ==
=== Weekly charts ===
Weekly chart performance
Chart (2025)	Peak position
Japanese Albums (Oricon)	2
Japanese Combined Albums (Oricon)	2
Japanese Hot Albums (Billboard Japan)	7
South Korean Albums (Circle)	1
US Billboard 200	23

=== Monthly charts ===
Monthly chart performance
Chart (2025)	Position
Japanese Albums (Oricon)	3
South Korean Albums (Circle)	1

=== Yearly charts ===
Yearly chart performance
Chart (2025)	Position
Japanese albums (Oricon)	45
South Korean Albums (Circle)	6

== Certifications ==
Certifications
Region	Certification	Certified units/sales
South Korea (KMCA)	Million	1,000,000^{^}
Summaries
Worldwide (IFPI)	—	1,520,000
^{^} Shipments figures based on certification alone.

== Release history ==
Release history
Region	Date	Format(s)	Label
Various	September 1, 2026	Digital download; streaming	WakeOne
South Korea	September 1, 2026	CD	WakeOne
United States	September 5, 2026	CD	WakeOne
