= Cinema Paradise =

- Digital cover

EP by Zerobaseone
- Released: August 26, 2024
- Recorded: 2024
- Genre: K-pop
- Length: 20:18
- Language: Korean
- Labels: WakeOne; Genie Music; Stone Music

Zerobaseone chronology
You Had Me at Hello (2024)	Cinema Paradise (2024)	Prezent (2025)

Singles from Cinema Paradise
- 1. "Good So Bad" Released: August 26, 2024

Cinema Paradise is the fourth extended play by South Korean boy group Zerobaseone. It was released on August 26, 2024, by WakeOne and comprises seven tracks, with "Good So Bad" serving as the lead single.

== Background and release ==
On July 5, 2024, Ten Asia reported that Zerobaseone would be releasing a new music in August of the same year. On July 29, after the group's last performance at KCON Los Angeles 2024 in Crypto.com Arena, a mysterious video appeared with the phrases "Cinema Paradise" and "August 2024", hinting a comeback date for their new album and it was also uploaded right after on Zerobaseone social media accounts. The next day, Zerobaseone confirmed Cinema Paradise as the title of their fourth EP.

On August 1, 2024, a video trailer titled "'__ BAD' Film" was uploaded on Zerobaseone's YouTube account, which member Seok Matthew narrated and written the script and at the end of the video revealed the release date of the EP, to be on August 26. On August 5, Zerobaseone released the scheduler of the EP and revealed various teasing contents such as track posters, summer track videos, album samplers, and storyboards. On August 7, they released a poster revealing the EP's lead single titled "Good So Bad". On the subsequent two days, more posters were released revealing the remaining tracks from the EP.

Cinema Paradise was released worldwide on August 26, 2024, by WakeOne and Genie Music, along with the lead single "Good So Bad" and its music video.

== Tour ==
On April 29, 2024, Zerobaseone released the schedule for their first world tour from September to November 2024, in seven countries. On July 15, the group announced Timeless World as title of their first tour.

== Track listing ==
Cinema Paradise track listing
No.	Title	Lyrics	Music	Arrangement	Length
1.	"Good So Bad"	Kenzie	Kenzie; Andrew Choi; No2zcat; Jsong	No2zcat	2:57
2.	"Kill the Romeo"	Seo Young-joon; Lee Seu-ran; 4 Seasons (153/Joombas); Moon Ji-young (Lalala Studio); Ellie Suh (153/Joombas)	Imsuho; Naasim; Dr.Han; William Segerdahl	Imsuho; Naasim; Dr.Han	3:18
3.	"The Sea" (바다; (Note: "The Sea" is an original song by UP.) ZB1 Remake)	Jang Yong-jin	Jang	El Capitxn; Revin; Vendors (Lois)	2:40
4.	"Insomnia"	J14 (Artiffect); Lee Seu-ran; Yoo Ga-young (Artiffect); Lee Na-yoon (Jam Factory); Zaya (153/Joombas); Kim Sang-baek (Jam Factory); Lee Yi-jin; Hyung Geun (PNP); Pumpkin (Artiffect); Alphabet (153/Joombas); Spoon (153/Joombas); Lim Jeon (Lalala Studio); Mia (153/Joombas); Yeon Bo-ra (Artiffect); Green Lee (Lalala Studio); Yang So-yeon (Jam Factory)	Lewis Jankel; Jordan Shaw; Conor Blake; 153/Joombas	Shift K3Y	2:43
5.	"Road Movie"	Han Sung-eun (153/Joombas); Moon Ji-young (Lalala Studio); Hwa Im-hyun (PNP); Kim Hyu-ri (MUMW); Kim An-na (PNP); Liljune (153/Joombas)	Ninos Hanna; Niklas Jarelius Persson; Adam Ben Yahia; William Segerdahl; 153/Joombas	Persson; Yahia	3:00
6.	"Eternity"	Friday. (Galactika)	Star Wars (Galactika); Kimparkchella (Galaktica)	Team Galactika	2:36
7.	"Yura Yura" (Korean version)	Hiyori Nara; Ellie Love; Hanmina; Tsingtao; Ryo Ito; Sunpeach (PNP); Chaeryn (153/Joombas)	Justin Reinstein; Lee Woo-min "Collapsedone"; Melange (Inhouse)	Collapsedone; Reinstein	3:04
Total length:					20:18

== Accolades ==
Awards and nominations for Cinema Paradise
Award ceremony	Year	Category	Result	Ref.
D Awards	2025	Record of the Year (Daesang)	Won	

== Charts ==
=== Weekly charts ===
Weekly chart performance
Chart (2024)	Peak position
Belgian Albums (Ultratop Flanders)	174
Japanese Albums (Oricon)	4
Japanese Combined Albums (Oricon)	4
Japanese Hot Albums (Billboard Japan)	70
South Korean Albums (Circle)	1

=== Monthly charts ===
Monthly chart performance
Chart (2024)	Peak position
Japanese Albums (Oricon)	11
South Korean Albums (Circle)	1

=== Year-end charts ===
Year-end chart performance
Chart (2024)	Position
Japanese Albums (Oricon)	49
South Korean Albums (Circle)	16

== Certifications ==
Certifications
Region	Certification	Certified units/sales
South Korea (KMCA)	Million	1,000,000^{^}
^{^} Shipments figures based on certification alone.

== Release history ==
Release history
Region	Date	Format	Label
South Korea	August 26, 2024	CD	WakeOne
Various	August 26, 2024	Digital download; streaming	WakeOne
