= Youth in the Shade =

- Digital cover

EP by Zerobaseone
- Released: July 10, 2023
- Recorded: 2023
- Genres: K-pop; dance; R&B
- Length: 17:42
- Language: Korean
- Labels: WakeOne; Genie Music; Stone Music

Zerobaseone chronology
Youth in the Shade (2023)	Melting Point (2023)

Singles from Youth in the Shade
- 1. "In Bloom" Released: July 10, 2023

Youth in the Shade is the debut extended play by South Korean boy group Zerobaseone. It was released on July 10, 2023, by WakeOne and comprises six tracks, with "In Bloom" serving as the lead single.

== Background and release ==
Zerobaseone was formed through Boys Planet, a reality competition show, which aired from February 2 to April 20, 2023. The group's final members were announced on the show's finale, which was broadcast live on April 20.

A spoiler film for the album, titled "Youth in the Shade", was uploaded on May 14 and a title poster was released on June 7. The first teaser for "In Bloom" was released on July 6 and an album sampler, with audio snippets of each song, was released on July 8. The second teaser for "In Bloom" was released on July 9. The single's music video, along with the full album was released on July 10. A press showcase in Gwangjin District was also held on the same day.

The EP concept was centered around the theme of "the beauty of youth and the shadow behind it". It was released for pre-order on June 21, and is available in two artbook versions and nine digipack versions.

== Composition ==
Youth in the Shade consists of a total of 6 tracks. The opening track, "Back to Zerobase," is a drum and bass song that is meant to capture the initial emotions felt when a dream comes true, with the members expressing feelings of anticipation for the future and journey they face ahead. The second track and lead single, "In Bloom," is a drum and bass and synth-pop song that samples the main riff from the 1984 single "Take On Me" from the Norwegian synth-pop band a-ha. The lyrics describe the members having the courage to take their first meaningful step as a group, while being aware of an inevitable end, as they are determined to run to you. The third track, "New Kidz on the Block," is a dance-pop song with elements of UK garage, 2-step garage, and deep house that describes the group's determination to rise to the top. The fourth track, "And I," is a R&B pop song that captures the members secret admiration for someone through social media. The fifth track, "Our Season," is a pop song that discusses the members friendship and dreams, their excitement for the moments they will capture, and the memories they will make throughout their time as a group. The closing track, "Always," is a solo song designated to member Zhang Hao as a prize for placing first in the final ranking of Boys Planet. It is an alternative R&B song in which he expresses his appreciation and gratitude towards his fans, making a promise to always be with them.

== Commercial performance ==
Preorders for the EP surpassed 780,000 copies in five days and 1.08 million copies in 13 days, breaking the record for the most pre-ordered K-pop debut album and becoming the first K-pop debut album to sell over a million copies. According to the Hanteo Chart, the album sold 1.24 million copies on its first day of release and 1,822,028 copies in its first week. The album was subsequently certified double million by the Korea Music Content Association (KMCA), setting a record as the first K-pop debut album to sell more than 2 million copies. According to the International Federation of the Phonographic Industry (IFPI)'s Global Music Report for 2023, Youth in the Shade was the eighteenth most-consumed album across all formats, and the eleventh best-selling album worldwide, having sold 2.2 million units. (Note: The IFPI Global Albums chart ranks, in order, the albums that generated the most money globally across streaming, download, and physical record sales (combined) in a calendar year. The Global Album Sales Chart measures global unit sales across all physical formats, as well as full album downloads.)

== Track listing ==
Youth in the Shade track listing
No.	Title	Lyrics	Music	Arrangement	Length
1.	"Back to Zerobase"	Jo Yoon-kyung; Danke (Lalala Studio); Seo Ji-eum; Seulli (MUMW); Yiyijin	Will Lansley (Punctual); John Morgan (Punctual); Jordan Shaw; Danny Shah	Lansley; Morgan; Shaw; Shah	2:45
2.	"In Bloom"	Seo Young-jun; Danke (Lalala Studio); Jo Yoon-kyung; Yiyijin; Suh Ji-eum; Rum (MUMW); Jeon Hye-kyung (MUMW)	Imsuho (Ntrophy/P.Maker); Niko (Ntrophy/P.Maker); MLC; Gabriel Brandes	Imsuho; Niko	3:00
3.	"New Kidz on the Block"	Jo Yoon-kyung	Imsuho (Ntrophy/P.Maker); Niko (Ntrophy/P.Maker); Andreas Öhrn	Imsuho; Niko	3:32
4.	"And I" (우주먼지; Ujumeonji [lit. 'Cosmic Dust'])	Jeong Se-hee (MUMW); Young (MUMW)	Val Del Prete; Moon Kim (Room01); Nild (MonoTree); Lee Seung-hun; Haring; Orom	Nild; Lee; Haring; Orom	3:15
5.	"Our Season"	Ji In (Flyinglab); Jung Yeon-ji (Artiffect); Yoon Na-ra (Artiffect); Yoo Ga-young (Artiffect); Vendors (Collin); Alphabet (153/Joombas); Kim So-ha (Artiffect); Kim Hye-jeong (PNP); Yoon (Artiffect); Jung Ha-ri & Choi Bo-ra (153/Joombas); Na Jung-ah (153/Joombas); Song Yoo (Artiffect); Cian (Artiffect)	El Capitxn; Andy Love; Vendors (Prnce); Vendors (Chiller); Vendors (Collin); Haring	El Capitxn; Vendors (Prnce); Haring; Vendors (Chiller)	2:57
6.	"Always" (Zhang Hao solo)	Yiyijin	Imsuho; Niko; Dr. Han (Ntrophy/P.Maker); Julie Yu; Elias Öberg	Imsuho; Niko; Dr. Han	2:09
Total length:					17:42

== Accolades ==
Awards and nominations for Youth in the Shade
Award ceremony	Year	Category	Result	Ref.
Asian Pop Music Awards	2023	Best New Artist (Overseas)	Won	
Circle Chart Music Awards	2024	Rookie of the Year – Album	Won	
Circle Chart Music Awards	2024	Artist of the Year – Album	Nominated	
Golden Disc Awards	2024	Album Bonsang	Won	
Golden Disc Awards	2024	Album of the Year	Nominated	
Melon Music Awards	2023	Millions Top 10 Artist	Nominated	

== Charts ==
=== Weekly charts ===
Weekly chart performance
Chart (2023–2024)	Peak position
Belgian Albums (Ultratop Flanders)	114
Hungarian Physical Albums (MAHASZ)	27
Japanese Albums (Oricon)	2
Japanese Combined Albums (Oricon)	2
Japanese Hot Albums (Billboard Japan)	12
South Korean Albums (Circle)	1
Swedish Physical Albums (Sverigetopplistan)	4

=== Monthly charts ===
Monthly chart performance
Chart (2023)	Position
Japanese Albums (Oricon)	7
South Korean Albums (Circle)	2

=== Year-end charts ===
Year-end chart performance
Chart (2023)	Position
Global Albums (IFPI)	18
Japanese Albums (Oricon)	48
South Korean Albums (Circle)	10

== Certifications and sales ==
Certifications and sales
Region	Certification	Certified units/sales
China	—	64,000
Japan	—	100,000
South Korea (KMCA)	2× Million	2,000,000^{^}
Summaries
Worldwide (IFPI)	—	2,200,000
^{^} Shipments figures based on certification alone.

== Release history ==
Release history
Region	Date	Format	Label	Ref.
South Korea	July 10, 2023	CD	WakeOne; Genie Music; Stone Music	
Various	July 10, 2023	Digital download; streaming	WakeOne; Genie Music; Stone Music	
