= Melting Point (EP) =

- Digital cover

EP by Zerobaseone
- Released: November 6, 2023
- Genre: K-pop; dance; pop
- Length: 14:45
- Language: Korean
- Label: WakeOne; Genie Music; Stone Music

Zerobaseone chronology
Youth in the Shade (2023)	Melting Point (2023)	You Had Me at Hello (2024)

Singles from Melting Point
- 1. "Crush" Released: November 6, 2023

Melting Point is the second extended play by South Korean boy group Zerobaseone. It was released on November 6, 2023, by WakeOne and consists of five tracks, with "Crush" serving as the lead single.

== Title ==
The EP's title symbolizes the conceptual parallel between the melting of ice at 0 °C and the group's aspiration to forge a new realm through their compelling music and fervent performances.

== Background and release ==
On August 20, 2023, WakeOne released a teaser for Zerobaseone's second EP to be released on November later that year, hinting at a winter-themed album. On October 6, it was announced that the EP titled Melting Point would be released on November 6. On the same day, pre-order for the EP began. The track listing was released on October 19, with the track "Crush" announced as the lead single. Teasers for the music video of "Crush" were released on November 1 and 5.

The EP is available in three photobook versions and nine digipack versions.

== Composition ==
Melting Point consists of a total of 5 tracks. The opening track "Melting Point" is a song that "expresses the process of melting a heart frozen in love". The second track "Take My Hand" is a song that "contains the will to hold your hand and jump into a new world, and only we who sing and dance together". The third and lead track "Crush" is "an intense and powerful song that summarizes Zerobaseone's commitment to take the next step". The fifth track "Good Night" is a "Zerobaseone-style lullaby that consoles a hard day and night".

== Commercial performance ==
According to the EP's distributor Genie Music, preorders for the EP surpassed 1.7 million copies in 20 days on October 26. On its first day of release, the album sold 1.458 million copies according to Hanteo Chart, setting a record for the group as the first K-pop group to have first day sales of over 1 million copies for two consecutive times since its debut, following the same feat achieved by their debut EP Youth in the Shade. The album reportedly sold over 2 million copies in its first week of release, making them the first K-pop group to do so in debut year.

== Track listing ==
Track listing for Melting Point
No.	Title	Lyrics	Music	Arrangement	Length
1.	"Melting Point"	Jo Yoon-kyung; Yiyijin; 12h51m (XYXX); Sunflower	Kevin Oppa (Solcire Music); Arineh Karimi	Kevin	2:53
2.	"Take My Hand"	12h51m (XYXX); Moon Yeo-reum (Jam Factory); Sunflower; Seo Young-jun; Kim Ye-bin (Artiffect); Kang Eun-yu (Artiffect); Kim Soo-min (153/Joombas); Danke	Imsuho; Naasim; Dr.Han; Arineh Karimi; Gusten Dahqvist; Val Del Prete; Chris Wahle; Ryan Lawrie	Imsuho; Naasim; Dr.Han	3:35
3.	"Crush" (가시)	Melange (Inhouse); Song-yu (Inhouse); Jeong Min-ji (Inhouse); Sunflower; Jo Yoon-kyung; Danke; Kass	Imsuho; Niko; Chris Wahle; Ryan Lawrie; Ronnie Icon; Nicole Timms; Andreas Öhrn; Adora; Haedo (Papermaker)	Imsuho; Niko	2:49
4.	"Kidz Zone"	Lee Seu-ran; Lee Sol-bi (Inhouse)	Alex Hope; Luke Niccoli; Alex Bilo; Madi Yanofsky	Hope; Niccoli	2:29
5.	"Good Night"	Jo Yoon-kyung; Yiyijin; Sunflower	Imsuho; Niko; Julie Yu; Elias Öberg	Imsuho; Niko	2:59
Total length:					14:45

== Charts ==
=== Weekly charts ===
Weekly chart performance
Chart (2023–2024)	Peak position
Belgian Albums (Ultratop Flanders)	85
Hungarian Physical Albums (MAHASZ)	40
Japanese Albums (Oricon)	2
Japanese Combined Albums (Oricon)	2
Japanese Hot Albums (Billboard Japan)	31
South Korean Albums (Circle)	2
Swedish Physical Albums (Sverigetopplistan)	19

=== Monthly charts ===
Monthly chart performance
Chart (2023)	Position
Japanese Albums (Oricon)	8
South Korean Albums (Circle)	3

=== Year-end charts ===
Year-end chart performance
Chart (2023)	Position
Japanese Albums (Oricon)	66
South Korean Albums (Circle)	12

== Certifications ==
Certifications
Region	Certification	Certified units/sales
South Korea (KMCA)	Million	1,000,000^{^}
^{^} Shipments figures based on certification alone.

== Release history ==
Release history and formats for Melting Point
Region	Date	Format	Label	Ref.
South Korea	November 6, 2023	CD	WakeOne; Genie Music; Stone Music	
Various	November 6, 2023	Digital download; streaming	WakeOne; Genie Music; Stone Music	
