= Sweat (Zerobaseone song) =

Single by Zerobaseone

from the EP You Had Me at Hello
- Language: Korean
- Released: April 24, 2024
- Recorded: 2024
- Genre: Dance; house
- Length: 3:11
- Label: WakeOne
- Composers: Kyler Niko; Rajan Muse; Gabriel Brandes
- Lyricist: Kim Windy (JamFactory)
- Producer: Rajan Muse

Zerobaseone singles chronology
"Yura Yura (Unmei no Hana)" (2024)	"Sweat" (2024)	"Feel the Pop" (2024)

Music video
- Sweat on YouTube

Professional ratings
Review scores
Source	Rating
IZM	3.5/5 stars

"Sweat" is a song recorded by South Korean boy group Zerobaseone from their third extended play (EP) You Had Me at Hello. It was released as the first single from the EP by WakeOne on April 24, 2024.

== Background and release ==
On March 31, Zerobaseone revealed a spoiler film "Summer Came Early" at the end of their special stage performance at the 2024 KCON in Hong Kong and announced that they would be releasing their third EP in May 2024, hinting a summer-themed album. The group announced that they would released a pre-release single "Sweat" on April 24 ahead of their third EP in May. A snippet of the track was released on April 17 on Zerobaseone official TikTok account, runs for 44 seconds and presumably highlights the hook of the single. A 24-second teaser for the single's music video was released on April 22. The single along with its music video was released on April 24, 2024.

== Composition ==
"Sweat" has a runtime of three minutes and 11 seconds. The song was written by Kim Windy, Kyler Niko, and Gabriel Brandes alongside producer Rajan Muse. Musically, the song features dance music in the exhilarating house genre with synth melodies and R&B vocals. Lyrically, it is about being entirely involved in dancing with you beneath the scorching sun, where nothing else matters right now. The repeating chorus, paired with the members' individual vocals, heightens the invigorating atmosphere. It captures the time when the heat and passion of summer show through, along with our limitless possibilities, in a lovely and incredibly addicting manner. The song is composed in the key of B minor with a tempo of 119 beats per minute.

== Music video ==
The music video for "Sweat" was released in conjunction with the single and the third EP. It showcases the members enjoying the summer heat in their own ways as they dance in the rain under the signpost labeled 'HELLO ZB1', and visualizes the song in constantly shifting landscapes set in a stage surrounded by water and a middle of the road.

== Promotion ==
Prior to the release of You Had Me at Hello on May 13, Zerobaseone released their pre-release single "Sweat" on April 24. They subsequently performed on four music programs: Mnet's M Countdown on April 25, KBS2's Music Bank on April 26, MBC's Show! Music Core on April 27, and SBS's Inkigayo on April 28.

== Accolades ==
Awards and nominations for "Sweat"
Award ceremony	Year	Category	Result	Ref.
Asian Pop Music Awards	2024	Top 20 Songs of the Year (Overseas)	Won	

== Charts ==
Chart performance for "Sweat"
Chart (2024)	Peak position
Japan Download (Billboard Japan)	73
South Korea BGM (Circle)	99
South Korea Download (Circle)	8

== Release history ==
Release history for "Sweat"
Region	Date	Format	Label
Various	April 24, 2024	Digital download; streaming	WakeOne
