= Good So Bad =

- Promotional poster

Single by Zerobaseone

from the EP Cinema Paradise
- Language: Korean
- Released: August 26, 2024
- Genre: Electronic; synth-pop
- Length: 2:57
- Label: WakeOne
- Composers: Kenzie; Andrew Choi; No2zcat; Jsong
- Lyricist: Kenzie
- Producers: Kenzie; No2zcat

Zerobaseone singles chronology
"Feel the Pop" (2024)	"Good So Bad" (2024)	"Only One Story" (2024)

Music video
- "Good So Bad" on YouTube

"Good So Bad" is a song recorded by South Korean boy group Zerobaseone from their fourth extended play (EP) Cinema Paradise. It was released as the lead single of the EP by WakeOne on August 26, 2024.

== Background and release ==
On July 5, 2024, Ten Asia reported that Zerobaseone would be releasing a new music in August of the same year. On July 29, after the group's last performance at KCON Los Angeles 2024 in Crypto.com Arena, a mysterious video appeared with the phrases "Cinema Paradise" and "August 2024", hinting a comeback date for their new album and it was also uploaded right after on Zerobaseone social media accounts. The next day, Zerobaseone confirmed Cinema Paradise as the title of their fourth EP.

On August 7, a promotional poster for the EP's lead single, "Good So Bad", was released. A second promotional poster was released five days later. Two teasers for the music video of the single were released on August 21 and 24. "Good So Bad" was released with the EP Cinema Paradise on August 26.

A Japanese version of "Good So Bad" was released on August 30, and was later included on the band's first Japanese EP Prezent (2025).

== Composition ==
"Good So Bad" was written and composed by Kenzie, who was also assisted by Andrew Choi, No2zcat and Jsong in the music composition. Musically, the song has been described as "an electronic synth-pop genre song".

== Credits and personnel ==
Credits adapted from the EP's liner notes.

Studio

- WakeOne Studio – recording
- Vibe Music Studio 606 – recording
- GCA Studio – engineered for mix
- Klang Studio – mixing, Dolby Atmos mixing, Dolby Atmos mastering
- Sterling Sound – mastering

Personnel

- Zerobaseone – vocals
- Kenzie – producer, lyrics, composition, vocal arrangement
- Andrew Choi – composition, background vocals
- No2zcat – producer, composition, arrangement, drums, bass, synthesizer
- Jsong – composition
- Hong Soo-yeon – recording
- Lee Kang-hyun – recording
- Lee Yoo-na – recording
- Ahn Soo-yeon – recording assistant
- Kang Dong-ho – digital editing
- Eom Se-hyun – engineered for mix
- Koo Jong-pil – mixing, Dolby Atmos mixing, Dolby Atmos mastering
- Chris Gehringer – mastering

== Accolades ==
Music program awards for "Good So Bad"
Program	Date	Ref.
Inkigayo	September 8, 2024	
M Countdown	September 5, 2024	
Music Bank	September 6, 2024	
Show Champion	September 4, 2024	
The Show	September 3, 2024	

== Charts ==
=== Weekly charts ===
Weekly chart performance for "Good So Bad"
Chart (2024)	Peak position
Japan (Japan Hot 100)	39
Japan Combined Singles (Oricon)	50
South Korea (Circle)	39

=== Monthly charts ===
Monthly chart performance for "Good So Bad"
Chart (2024)	Position
South Korea Download (Circle)	8

== Release history ==
Release history for "Good So Bad"
Region	Date	Format	Version	Label
Various	August 26, 2024	Digital download; streaming	Original	WakeOne
Various	August 30, 2024	Digital download; streaming	Japanese	WakeOne; Lapone
