= You Had Me at Hello (EP) =

- Digital cover

EP by Zerobaseone
- Released: May 13, 2024
- Recorded: 2024
- Genre: K-pop
- Length: 20:43
- Language: Korean
- Labels: WakeOne; Genie Music; Stone Music

Zerobaseone chronology
Melting Point (2023)	You Had Me at Hello (2024)	Cinema Paradise (2024)

Singles from You Had Me at Hello
- 1. "Sweat" Released: April 24, 2024; 2. "Feel the Pop" Released: May 13, 2024

You Had Me at Hello is the third extended play by South Korean boy group Zerobaseone. It was released on May 13, 2024, by WakeOne and comprises seven tracks, with "Sweat" serving as the first single and "Feel the Pop" serving as the lead single.

== Background and release ==
On March 31, Zerobaseone revealed a spoiler film "Summer Came Early" at the end of their special stage performance at the 2024 KCON in Hong Kong and announced that they will be releasing their third EP in May 2024, hinting a summer-themed album. On April 14, the group unveiled You Had Me at Hello as the title of their third EP and would be released on May 13. Pre-order for the EP began the next day. A pre-release single "Sweat" was released on April 24 ahead of their comeback.

Zerobaseone announced "Feel the Pop" as their lead single for the EP. The EP's tracklist was released on May 3, consists of seven songs and Young K from the band Day6 revealed to have written the lyrics for the B-side track "Hello". The first teaser of "Feel the Pop" was released on May 9. The album sampler, with audio snippets of each song, was released on May 10. The second teaser of the EP's single was released on May 11.

On May 13, the EP was released along with the lead single "Feel the Pop" and its music video.

== Composition ==
You Had Me at Hello consists of a total of seven tracks. The opening track, "Solar Power", is a hip-hop song featuring strong bass and swirling electric guitars. Lyrically, it reflects the narrative that Zerobaseone became a brighter team thanks to meeting the fateful you. The second track and lead single, "Feel the Pop", is an addictive pop song that mixes various rhythms such as D&B, UK garage, and Jersey club. The lyrics expresses the will to present the best time so that the hesitations, worries, and concerns that all young people face can be forgotten and blown away. The third track, "Dear Eclipse", is an R&B song made by sampling the piano riff of the lead single. Lyrically, it melts the emotions of the members who have matured on the border between day and night. The fourth track and first single, "Sweat", is dance song in the exhilarating house genre with synth melodies and R&B vocals. The lyrics is about this moment when I can't think of anything because I'm focused on dancing with you. The fifth track, "Sunday Ride", is a light and cheerful medium tempo song and expresses the desire to escape from everyday life and go on a trip somewhere. The sixth track, "Hello", is an emotional ballad song with a sweet melody flowing over a lyrical acoustic guitar melody. It contains ZB1's feelings toward their fans and was written by Young K from Day6. The closing track is the speed up version of the lead single.

== Commercial performance ==
According to Hanteo Chart, the album sold 1.008 million copies setting a record for the group as the first K-pop group to have first day sales of over one million copies for three consecutive times since their debut, following the same feat achieved by their two predecessor EPs and sold over 1.3 million copies on its first week.

== Accolades ==
Awards and nominations for You Had Me at Hello
Award ceremony	Year	Category	Result	Ref.
Golden Disc Awards	2025	Album Bonsang	Won	
Golden Disc Awards	2025	Album Daesang	Nominated	

=== Listicles ===
Listicles
Publisher	Year	Listicle	Placement	Ref.
Billboard	2024	The 20 Best K-Pop Albums of 2024 (So Far): Staff Picks	20th	

== Track listing ==
You Had Me at Hello track listing
No.	Title	Lyrics	Music	Arrangement	Length
1.	"Solar Power"	Suan (153/Joombas); Baek So-hyun (Jam Factory); Ahn Mi-sun (XYXX); Seon (XYXX); Subbit; Kim Da-seul (Jam Factory); Jooha (Artiffect); Seo Lee-won (Lalala Studio)	El Capitxn; Chris Wahle; Bad Milk; Ninos Hanna; William Segerdahl; Vendors (Zenur); Vendors (Owl); Vendors (Chiller)	El Capitxn; Vendors (Zenur)	2:51
2.	"Feel the Pop"	Kim Su-ji (Lalala Studio); Ha Yoon-a (153/Joombas); 12h51m (XYXX); Lee Hyoung-joo (Lalala Studio); Kim So-ha (Artiffect); David Wilson; Max Schneider; Sean Douglas	David Wilson; Max Schneider; Sean Douglas	Dwilly	2:56
3.	"Dear Eclipse"	Kim An-na (PNP); Moon Hye-min	Melange (Inhouse); Voll (Inhouse); Ezit (Inhouse); Jessica Pierpoint; Lipnine; Dwilly	Melange (Inhouse); Voll (Inhouse); Ezit (Inhouse)	2:49
4.	"Sweat"	Kim Windy (Jam Factory)	Kyler Niko; Rajan Muse; Gabriel Brandes	Rajan Muse	3:11
5.	"Sunday Ride"	Yoon (Artiffect); 4 Season (153/Joombas); Lee Green (Lalala Studio); Kim Chae-ah (153/Joombas); Seo Hye-ri (Jam Factory); Danke	El Capitxn; Chris Wahle; Ninos Hanna; Andreas Öberg; Ronnie Icon; Werdy; Vendors (Zenur); Vendors (Coll!n); Vendors (Owl); Vendors (Chiller); Niklas Jarelius Persson	El Capitxn; Vendors (Zenur)	2:59
6.	"Hello"	Young K (Day6); Bang Hye-hyun	Alex Keem; Sqvare; Voradory; Avenue 52	Voradory	3:33
7.	"Feel the Pop" (Sped Up version)	Kim Su-ji (Lalala Studio); Ha Yoon-a (153/Joombas); 12h51m (XYXX); Lee Hyoung-joo (Lalala Studio); Kim So-ha (Artiffect); David Wilson; Max Schneider; Sean Douglas	David Wilson; Max Schneider; Sean Douglas	Dwilly	2:24
Total length:					20:43

== Charts ==
=== Weekly charts ===
Weekly chart performance
Chart (2024)	Peak position
Belgian Albums (Ultratop Flanders)	80
Croatian International Albums (HDU)	22
Japanese Albums (Oricon)	1
Japanese Combined Albums (Oricon)	1
Japanese Hot Albums (Billboard Japan)	23
Polish Albums (ZPAV)	66
South Korean Albums (Circle)	1

=== Monthly charts ===
Monthly chart performance
Chart (2024)	Position
Japanese Albums (Oricon)	3
South Korean Albums (Circle)	2

=== Year-end charts ===
Year-end chart performance
Chart (2024)	Position
Japanese Albums (Oricon)	55
South Korean Albums (Circle)	25

== Certifications ==
Certifications
Region	Certification	Certified units/sales
South Korea (KMCA)	3× Platinum	932,710
South Korea (KMCA) Poca Album	Platinum	490,415

== Release history ==
Release history
Region	Date	Format	Label	Ref.
South Korea	May 13, 2024	CD	WakeOne; Genie Music	
Various	May 13, 2024	digital download; streaming	WakeOne; Stone Music	
