= Yura Yura (Unmei no Hana) =

- Digital and regular edition cover

Single by Zerobaseone
- Language: Japanese
- B-side: "In Bloom" (Japanese version); "Crush" (Japanese version)
- Released: March 8, 2024
- Length: 3:04
- Label: WakeOne; Lapone
- Composers: Justin Reinstein; Lee Woo-min "Collapsedone"; Melange (Inhouse)
- Lyricists: Hiyori Nara; Tsingtao; Ellie Love; Hanmina; Chaeryn (153/Joombas); Sunpeach (PNP); Ryo Ito
- Producers: Justin Reinstein; Lee Woo-min "Collapsedone"

Zerobaseone singles chronology
"Crush" (2023)	"Yura Yura (Unmei no Hana)" (2024)	"Sweat" (2024)

Music video
- "Yura Yura (Unmei no Hana)" on YouTube

"Yura Yura (Unmei no Hana)" (Japanese: ゆらゆら -運命の花-; lit. 'swaying (flower of destiny)') is the first Japanese single by South Korean boy group Zerobaseone. It was released by WakeOne and Lapone Entertainment on March 8, 2024.

== Background and release ==
On November 29, 2023, WakeOne confirmed that Zerobaseone will be making their Japanese debut under Lapone Entertainment in March 2024. On December 19, it was announced that the Japanese debut date is set on March 20, 2024, with the single "Yura Yura (Unmei no Hana)", which will include the Japanese version of the group's previous Korean singles, "In Bloom" and "Crush". On January 30, 2024, the promotion calendar was released, revealing a digital release date of March 8. This was followed by two series of concept photos released on February 1–8. The song was released digitally on March 8, 2024.

The physical release of "Yura Yura (Unmei no Hana)" comes in twelve editions. The regular and the nine member solo jacket editions were released as CD-only, while the limited edition A and B come with a DVD bundle consisting of a bonus behind-the-scenes footage of the group's Japanese debut activities and a photo book respectively. The concept of the single is described as "a spring fantasy", which conveys the energy of spring in a world where everything is colorful.

== Commercial performance ==
"Yura Yura (Unmei no Hana)" debuted at number one on the Oricon Daily Singles Chart with 187,694 copies sold, setting a new record for the first day sales of a debut single by a K-pop artist in Japan. It topped the weekly chart with 302,315 copies sold, making Zerobaseone the first foreign artist to sell more than 300,000 copies in the first week with their Japanese debut single. It also ranked first on the Billboard Japan Top Singles Sales with over a half million copies sold in its first week.

== Track listing ==
"Yura Yura (Unmei no Hana)" track listing
No.	Title	Lyrics	Music	Arrangement	Length
1.	"Yura Yura (Unmei no Hana)" (ゆらゆら -運命の花-)	Hiyori Nara; Tsingtao; Ellie Love; Hanmina; Chaeryn (153/Joombas); Sunpeach (PNP); Ryo Ito	Justin Reinstein; Lee Woo-min "Collapsedone"; Melange (Inhouse)	Justin Reinstein; Lee Woo-min "Collapsedone"	3:04
2.	"In Bloom" (Japanese version)	Seo Young-jun; Danke (Lalala Studio); Jo Yoon-kyung; Yiyijin; Suh Ji-eum; Rum (MUMW); Jeon Hye-kyung (MUMW)	Imsuho; Niko; MLC; Gabriel Brandes	Imsuho; Niko	3:00
3.	"Crush" (Japanese version)	Melange (Inhouse); Song-yu (Inhouse); Jeong Min-ji (Inhouse); Sunflower; Jo Yoon-kyung; Danke; Kass	Imsuho; Niko; Chris Wahle; Ryan Lawrie; Ronnie Icon; Nicole Timms; Andreas Öhrn; Adora; Haedo (Papermaker)	Imsuho; Niko	2:49
Total length:					8:53

== Charts ==
=== Weekly charts ===
Weekly chart performance
Chart (2024)	Peak position
Japan (Japan Hot 100)	3
Japan (Oricon)	1
Japan Combined Singles (Oricon)	1
South Korea Download (Circle)	167

=== Monthly charts ===
Monthly chart performance
Chart (2024)	Position
Japan (Oricon)	1

== Certifications ==
Certifications
Region	Certification	Certified units/sales
Japan (RIAJ) Physical	2× Platinum	500,000^{^}
^{^} Shipments figures based on certification alone.

== Release history ==
Release history
Region	Date	Format	Version	Label
Various	March 8, 2024	Digital download; streaming	Original	WakeOne; Lapone
Japan	March 20, 2024	CD	Original	WakeOne; Lapone
Various	August 26, 2024	Digital download; streaming	Korean (Note: From Zerobaseone's fourth Korean EP Cinema Paradise)	WakeOne
