= Zerobaseone =

South Korean boy band

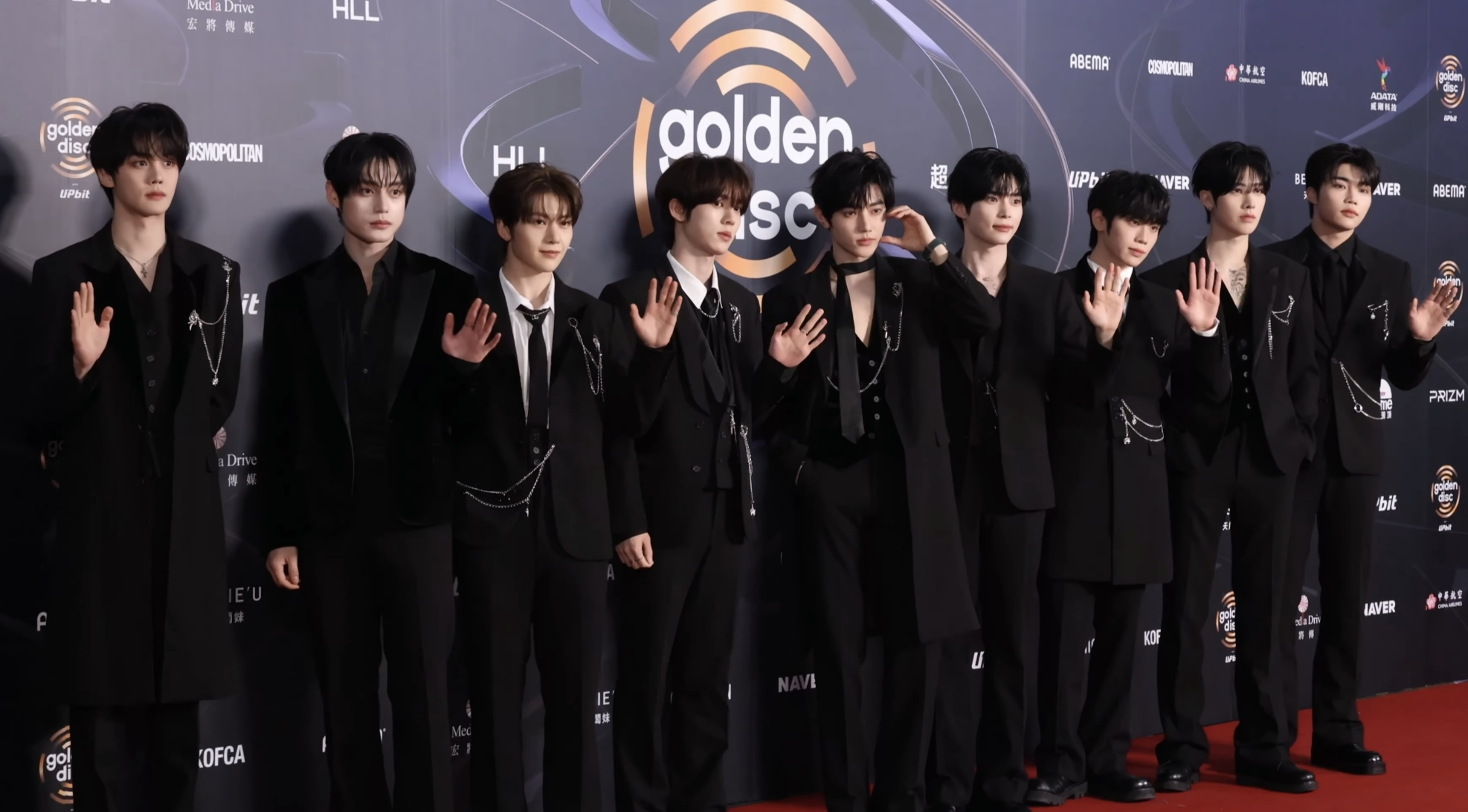
- Zerobaseone in January 2026; L–R: Kim Gyu-vin, Kim Ji-woong, Seok Matthew, Han Yu-jin, Zhang Hao, Sung Han-bin, Kim Tae-rae, Ricky, and Park Gun-wook

Background information
- Also known as: ZB1
- Origin: Seoul, South Korea
- Genre: K-pop
- Years active: 2023–present
- Labels: WakeOne; Lapone/Sony Japan
- Spinoffs: Zerobaseone EMP
- Members: Kim Ji-woong; Sung Han-bin; Seok Matthew; Kim Tae-rae; Park Gun-wook
- Past members: Zhang Hao; Ricky; Kim Gyu-vin; Han Yu-jin
- Website: wake-one.com/artists/zerobaseone

Korean name
- Hangul: 제로베이스원
Transcriptions
- Revised Romanization: Jerobeiseuwon
- McCune–Reischauer: Cherobeisŭwŏn

Japanese name
- Katakana: ゼロベースワン
Transcriptions
- Revised Hepburn: Zerobēsuwan

Zerobaseone (Korean: 제로베이스원; stylized in all caps; abbreviated as ZB1) is a South Korean boy band formed through Mnet's reality competition program Boys Planet and managed by WakeOne. The group consists of five members: Kim Ji-woong, Sung Han-bin, Seok Matthew, Kim Tae-rae, and Park Gun-wook. Zerobaseone was originally a nine-piece ensemble; members Zhang Hao, Ricky, Kim Gyu-vin, and Han Yu-jin left the group in March 2026 following their contract expiration.

Zerobaseone debuted on July 10, 2023, with the extended play (EP) Youth in the Shade and was commercially successful upon release, selling over two million units, peaking at number one on South Korean Circle Album Chart and being included among the best-selling albums worldwide of the year according to International Federation of the Phonographic Industry (IFPI). In addition, the EP's lead single, "In Bloom", charted on Billboard Global 200. The group earned a "Rookie Grand Slam" (2023–2024) by sweeping the ten Rookie of the Year awards at different domestic award ceremonies, including Golden Disc Awards, MAMA Awards, Melon Music Awards, and Seoul Music Awards.

== Name ==
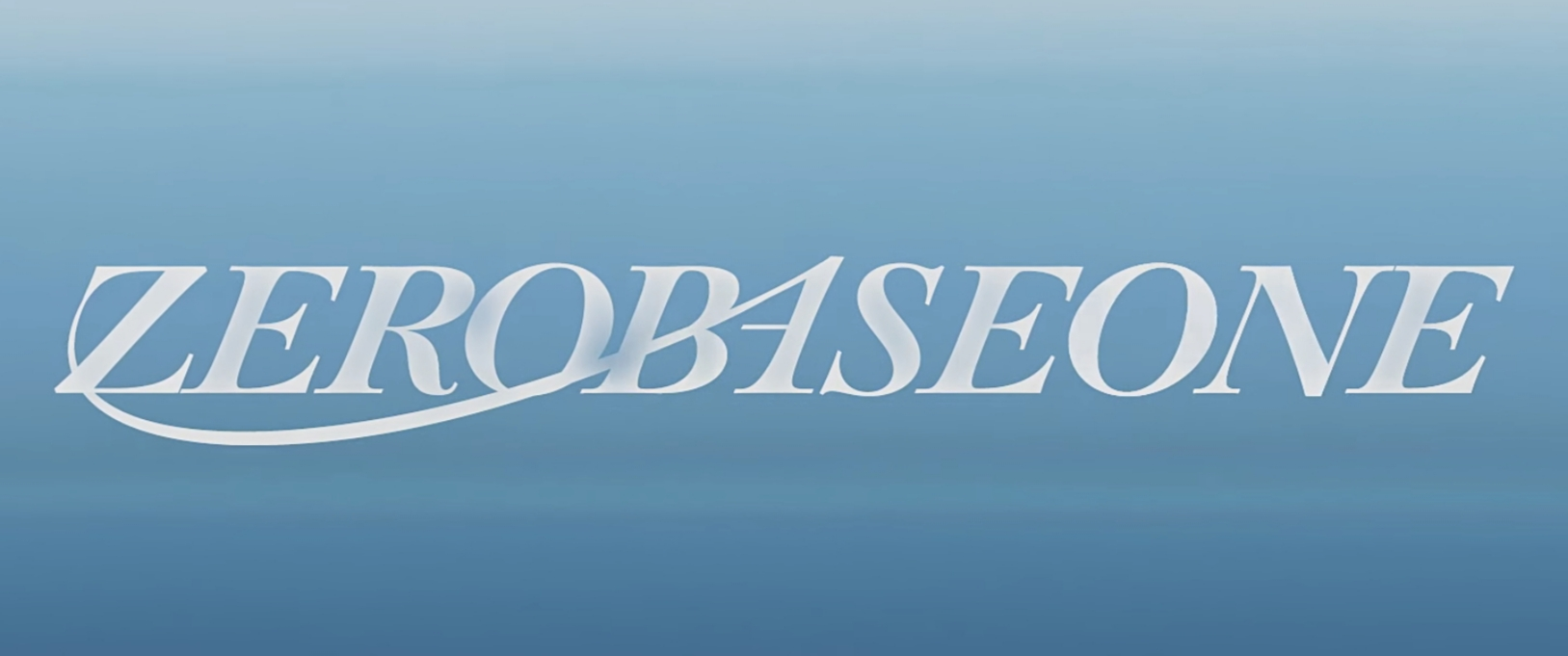
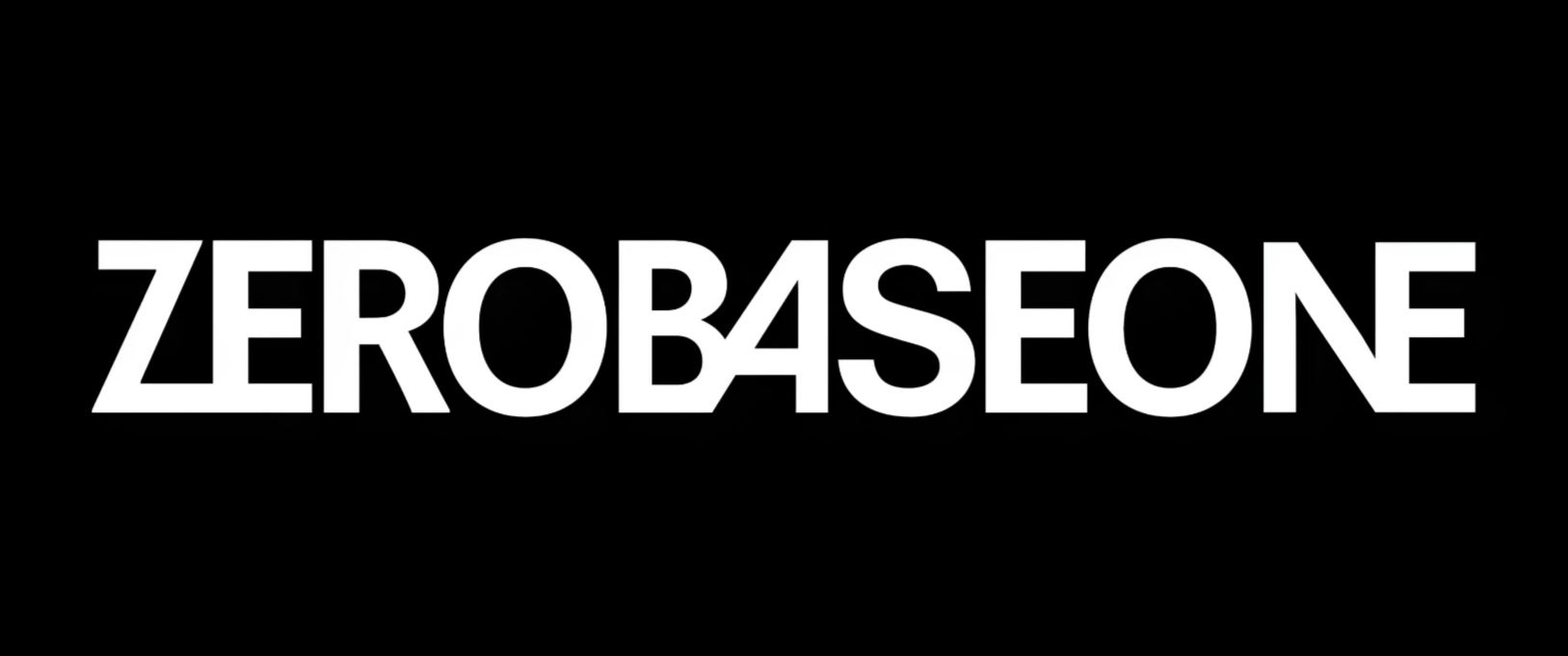
The old (left) and new (right) logos of Zerobaseone

Zerobaseone represents the "journey of the nine trainees to be completed as one after their debut". It refers to the "glorious beginning" of the nine members, starting from zero (0) and ending with one (1), and implies the members' commitment to share with their fans the unfinished journey of their group from zero to one. Zerobaseone is abbreviated as ZB1.

== History ==
=== Formation through Boys Planet and other activities ===
Zerobaseone was formed through Mnet's reality competition series Boys Planet, which aired from February 2 to April 20, 2023. The show brought 98 contestants from around the world, primarily in South Korea, China, Hong Kong, Taiwan, Japan, Thailand, Vietnam, the United States, and Canada, to compete and to debut in a multinational boy group. Out of a pool of 98 contestants, only the top nine would make the final lineup. All members were announced in the finale episode, which was broadcast live on April 20, 2023, where they'll be active for about two years and six months.

Before appearing on the program, several members had already been active in the entertainment industry. Kim Ji-woong was a member of the boy group INX and an active actor who had appeared on multiple BL web series, such as Kissable Lips and Roommates of Poongduck 304. In 2020, Kim Tae-rae competed in the competitive singing show, Top 10 Student. In 2021, Park Gun-wook competed in the survival reality show, Wild Idol. However, he did not make it into the final lineup of the boy group, TAN.

=== 2023: Debut with Youth in the Shade, and Melting Point ===
In April 2023, WakeOne announced that Zerobaseone started to prepare with the goal of debuting in the middle of the year.

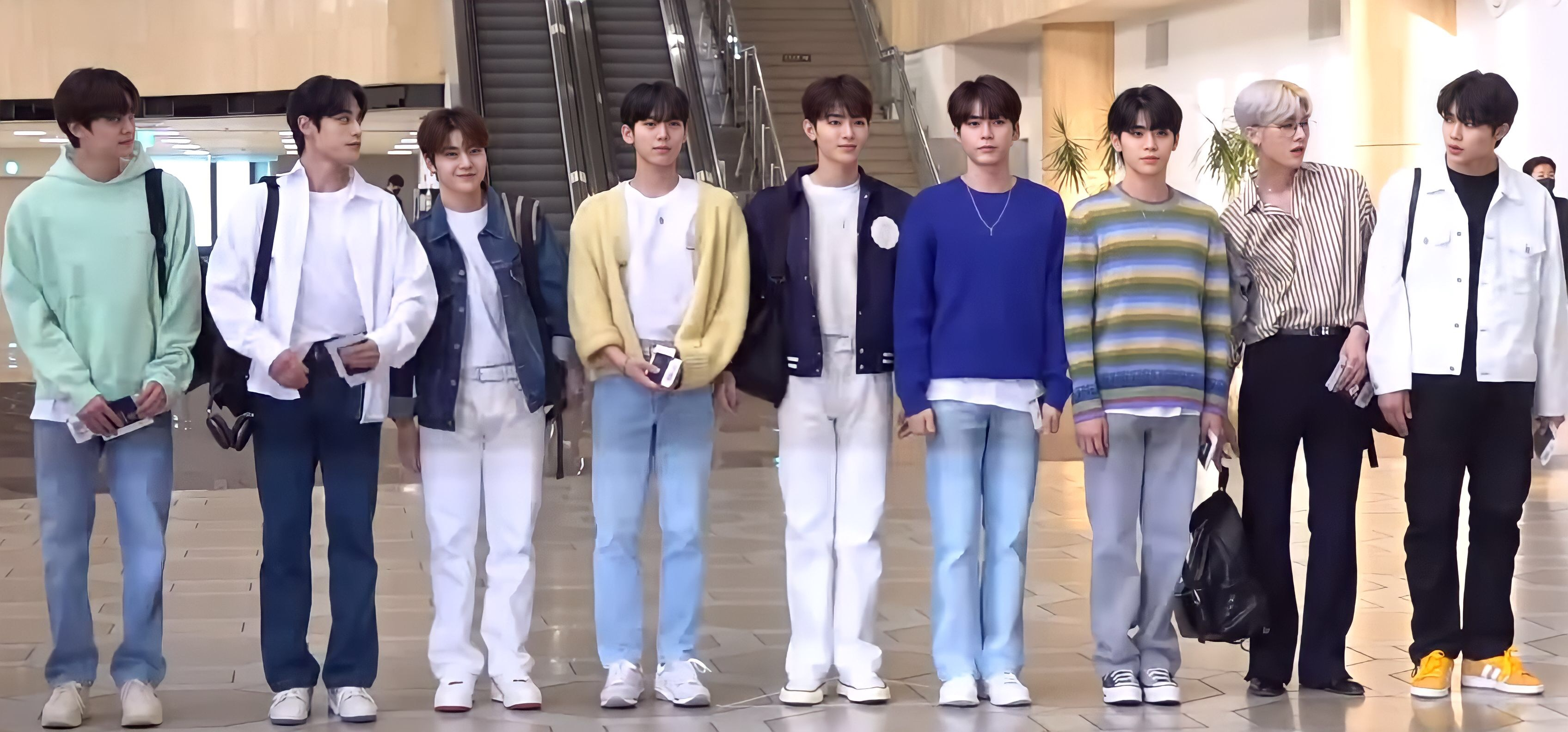
Zerobaseone at Gimpo International Airport to attend KCON Japan 2023.

On May 14, Zerobaseone released a spoiler film, Youth in Shade, after completing their first group schedule at KCON Japan 2023. The released video features two members, Zhang Hao and Sung Han-bin, who at the end of the video face each other with a small candle in the middle, after which the words 'Youth', 'In The', and 'Shade' appear intersecting. On May 26, WakeOne confirmed that Zerobaseone would debut in July 2023.

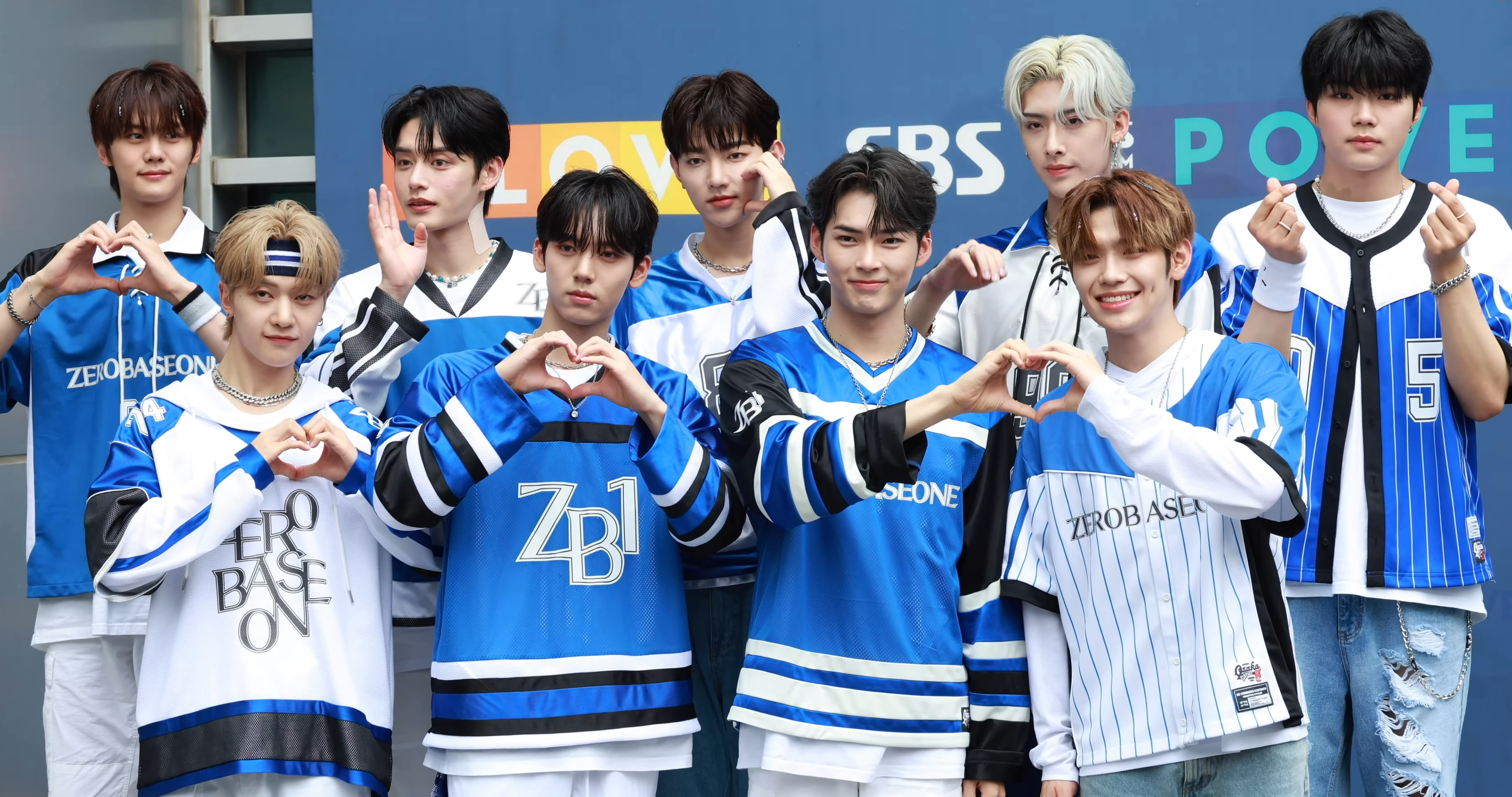
Zerobaseone outside the SBS Prism Tower in July 2023.

On June 22, the first episode of the group's pre-debut reality show Camp Zerobaseone was aired on Mnet. The reality show consists of 3 episodes aiming for a journey that will help the members bond and get to know one another even better. On June 26, the album was reported to have amassed over 780,000 pre-orders within five days, surpassing 1.08 million copies by July 4, setting the record for the highest number of pre-orders for a K-pop debut album. The group officially debuted on July 10, with their first EP Youth in the Shade along with its lead single "In Bloom" and music video. On the same day, they held a press showcase in the afternoon at Yes24 Live Hall in Gwangjin District, Seoul and also broadcast live their fan showcase titled "Zerobaseone Debut Show: In Bloom" on Mnet at 20:00 (KST), it also live streaming via Mnet K-Pop YouTube channel, Abema, and Mnet Japan. The group earned their first music show win on SBS M's The Show eight days after their debut. In conjunction with their debut promotion, the group held their first fan concert at Gocheok Sky Dome on August 15 to an audience of 18,000. Youth in the Shade subsequently sold more than 2 million copies, setting a sales record for a K-pop debut album.

On August 20, it was announced that Zerobaseone would be releasing their second EP in November. On October 6, it was announced that the group's second EP Melting Point would be released on November 6. On October 26, the album amassed over 1.7 million pre-orders and reportedly sold over 2 million copies in its first week of release, making them the first K-pop group to do so in debut year.

On November 29, WakeOne confirmed that Zerobaseone will be making their Japanese debut and hold a fan-meeting in Japan under Lapone Entertainment in March 2024. Later, it was announced that the Japanese debut date would be on March 20, 2024.

=== 2024: Japanese debut, You Had Me at Hello, Cinema Paradise and first tour ===
On March 7, Zerobaseone released their debut Japanese single "Yura Yura (Unmei no Hana)" (ゆらゆら -運命の花-) along with its music video. The single was a commercial success, setting a new first day sales record for a debut single by a K-pop artist in Japan with over 187,000 copies sold. It ranked number one on the Oricon Weekly Singles Chart with over 302,000 copies sold, making Zerobaseone the first foreign artist to sell more than 300,000 copies in the first week with their Japanese debut single.

On March 31, Zerobaseone revealed a spoiler film "Summer Came Early" at the end of their special stage performance at the 2024 KCON in Hong Kong and announced that they will be releasing a new Korean album in May 2024. It was later reported that the respective album is slated to be the group's third EP titled You Had Me at Hello along with the lead single "Feel the Pop" to be released on May 13 and preceded with a pre-release song titled "Sweat" on April 24.

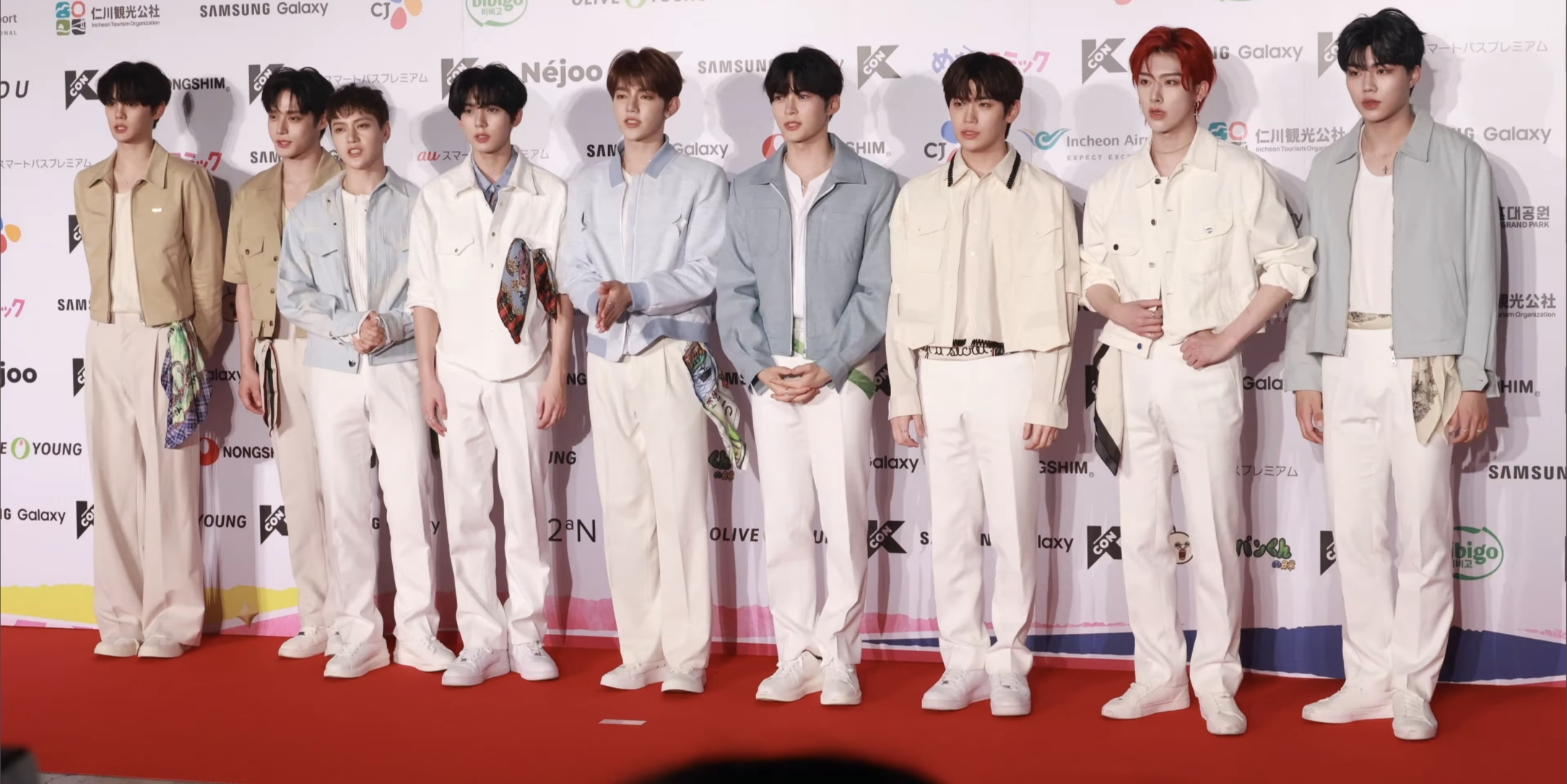
Zerobaseone at the KCON Japan 2024 red carpet.

On April 29, Zerobaseone announced the schedule for their first Asia tour, Timeless World, starting from Seoul in September 20, 2024 to Kanagawa in December 5, 2024. Their fourth EP, titled Cinema Paradise, was released on August 26.

It was announced on September 27 that Zerobaseone would release the single "Only One Story", serving as the new opening theme for Rayquaza Rising, the fourth chapter of Pokémon Horizons: The Series. The song was released as the new opening theme on October 11, the airdate of the 68th episode of the series and the first episode of the Rayquaza Rising saga.

=== 2025: Subsequent releases and concerts ===
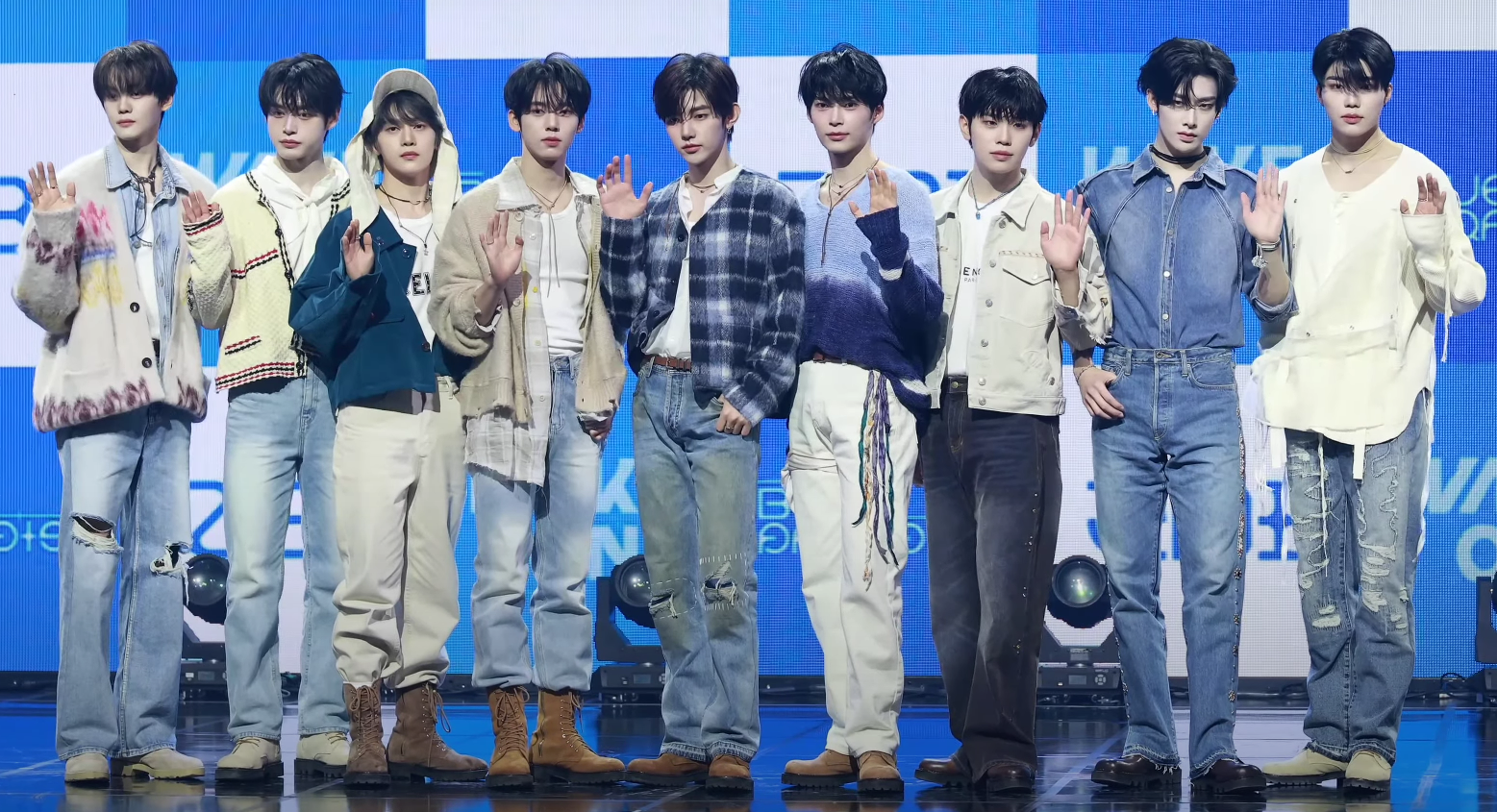
Zerobaseone at the media showcase of their EP Blue Paradise in February 2025.

On January 29, Zerobaseone released their first Japanese-language EP Prezent with title track "Now or Never". In addition, to the title track and Japanese versions of previous title tracks, "Feel the Pop" and "Good So Bad", this album also included the Pokémon Horizons: The Series soundtrack song "Only One Story", and 3 other original Japanese songs. Prior to the release of Prezent, Zerobaseone released "Doctor! Doctor!" on January 20, which serves as a pre-release single for their fifth Korean-language EP Blue Paradise. It was released on February 24, alongside the title track "Blue". On the same day, it was reported that WakeOne was evaluating a plan to extend the contract period of Zerobaseone.

On April 18, Zerobaseone held their second fan concert, 2025 Zerobaseone Fancon Blue Mansion, in KSPO Dome spanning for three days. In early July, WakeOne announced that the group run a pop-up cafe named Our Blue Bakery from July 10 to 20, in Seoul celebrating their second anniversary of debut and their second Asia tour, Hear & Now, scheduled from October to December. On July 20, WakeOne confirmed that Zerobaseone would release their first studio album Never Say Never on September 1, following the release of the first single "Slam Dunk" on July 23. By September 1, the group's first album and its title track, "Iconik", was released.

On September 18, WakeOne announced that Zerobaseone would be releasing their second Japanese-language EP Iconik on October 29, and it includes the Japanese version of the previous title tracks: "Iconik", "Slam Dunk", and "Blue". On October 2, the group released the live version of "I Know You Know" a day before the start of their second tour. On December 1, WakeOne announced the extension of the group activities until March 2026.

=== 2026: Re-Flow, lineup changes, Ascend-, Kaiki Love, and Zerobaseone EMP ===
On January 2, WakeOne announced the upcoming release of Zerobaseone's single album titled Re-Flow. Scheduled for, February 2, the album was described as a commemorative project reflecting on the nine members' experiences over their two-year and six-month tenure. The release served as a final project involving the full original lineup before the group's disbandment date in March, which had been established following a two-month contract extension. On January 12, YH Entertainment confirmed that its trainees—Zhang Hao, Ricky, Kim Gyu-vin, and Han Yu-jin—would depart from the group upon the expiration of their contracts. Following these departures, WakeOne announced on February 12, that Zerobaseone would reorganize and continue activities as a five-member group. The remaining members include Kim Ji-woong, Sung Han-bin, Seok Matthew, Kim Tae-rae, and Park Gun-wook. The group held their final concert as a nine-piece on March 15.

On April 27, Zerobaseone announced their reorganization as a five-member group alongside the release of their sixth EP, Ascend-, scheduled for May 18. The album's title and promotional imagery symbolize the group's continued growth and ambition following their transition to a quintet. On May 26, the four former members of Zerobaseone subsequently re-debuted as And2ble.

On June 24, Zerobaseone announced that they will be releasing their second Japanese EP Kaiki Love, on August 19.

On September 18, Zerobaseone announced that members Seok Matthew and Park Gun-wook will form a new project unit called Zerobaseone EMP, which released a mixtape on September 21.

== Other ventures ==
=== Endorsements ===
In July 2023, Zerobaseone was announced as the first brand models for Bring Green, a South Korean skincare brand. In the same year, the group was also selected as the brand muse for several clothing brands, such as Romantic Crown for its 2023 Fall/Winter Collection in September, Skoolooks for the launch promotion of its school winter uniform collection in November, and SPAO for a collaboration collection inspired from the group's song "Good Night" in December. In April 2024, coincidentally with their first formation anniversary, Zerobaseone collaborated with Line Friends to release nine new characters as the group's alter ego. Dubbed as "zeroni" (제로니), each character is named after each member's nickname.

=== Philanthropy ===
In March 2025, Zerobaseone donated ₩100 million (US$74,611) to Seoul National University Children's Hospital Sponsorship Association, in celebration for achieving the target of 10 million streams for "Doctor! Doctor!", under the group's fanclub Zerose.

== Members ==
=== Current ===
- Kim Ji-woong (김지웅)
- Sung Han-bin (성한빈) – leader
- Seok Matthew (석매튜)
- Kim Tae-rae (김태래)
- Park Gun-wook (박건욱)

=== Former ===
- Zhang Hao (장하오)
- Ricky (리키)
- Kim Gyu-vin (김규빈)
- Han Yu-jin (한유진)

== Sub-units ==
On September 21, 2026, Matthew and Gunwook debuted as a sub-unit called ZEROBASEONE EMP (제로베이스원 이엠에프). Their name combines the "E" from "Extra" (meaning "beyond the ordinary") with the initials of the members' English names. It also was inspired by the concept of an electromagnetic pulse, which embodies the ambition to create a space where only the duo's music exists, much like how an EMP cuts off all surrounding sounds the moment it detonates. The project was first announced just days prior on September 18 alongside a logo motion video. They made their official debut with the release of their first mixtape, EMP Mixtape Vol.1: We the Extra, which was confirmed on September 19 along with the announcement of a follow-up digital single scheduled for November 2026.

== Discography ==
- Never Say Never (2025)

== Videography ==
=== Music videos ===
Song title	Year	Director(s)	Ref.
"In Bloom"	2023	Kim In-tae (AFF)	
"Crush"	2023	Oui Kim (OUI), Song Hui-won	
"Melting Point"	2023	Wasabimayo (Sauce Factory)	
"Yura Yura"	2024	Dongyeon Kang (725) (SL8 Visual Lab)	
"Sweat"	2024	Swisher Film	
"Feel the Pop"	2024	Kim Ja-kyeong (Flexible Pictures)	
"Good So Bad"	2024	Dongyeon Kang (725) (SL8 Visual Lab)	
"Only One Story"	2024	Shin Hee-won	
"Now or Never"	2025	Shin Hee-won	
"Doctor! Doctor!"	2025	Han Dae-hee	
"Blue"	2025	Dongyeon Kang (725) (SL8 Visual Lab)	
"Slam Dunk"	2025	Dongyeon Kang (725) (SL8 Visual Lab)	
"Iconik"	2025	Rima Yoon (Rigend Film)	
"Running to Future"	2026	Xohee Park, Yujin Park	
"Top 5"	2026	Bang Jae-yeob	

== Filmography ==
=== Television shows ===
Year	Title	Role	Notes	Ref.
2024	Immortal Songs: Singing the Legend	Contestant	Winner on Episode 647 (TVXQ special)	
2025	Omniscient Interfering View	Protagonist		

=== Reality shows ===
Year	Title	Notes	Ref.
2023	Boys Planet	Reality competition show determining Zerobaseone's members	
2023	Camp Zerobaseone	Pre-debut reality show	

=== Web shows ===
Year	Title	Ref.
2023	ZBTV	
2024–present	ZBTVing	

== Tours and concerts ==
- Timeless World (2024)
- Here & Now Tour (2025–2026)

== Awards and nominations ==
Zerobaseone achieved a "Rookie Grand Slam" (2023–2024) by sweeping 10 Rookie of the Year Awards from different domestic award ceremonies.
