= In Bloom (Zerobaseone song) =

Single by Zerobaseone

from the EP Youth in the Shade
- Language: Korean
- Released: July 10, 2023
- Recorded: 2023
- Genre: Drum and bass; synth-pop
- Length: 3:00
- Label: WakeOne
- Lyricists: Seo Young-joon; Danke; Jo Yoon-kyung; Yi Yi-jin; Seo Ji-eum; Rum (MUMW); Jeon Hye-hyung (MUMW)
- Producers: Imsuho; Niko; MLC; Gabriel Brandes

Zerobaseone singles chronology
"In Bloom" (2023)	"Crush" (2023)

Music video
- "In Bloom" on YouTube

Professional ratings
Review scores
Source	Rating
IZM	3/5 stars

"In Bloom" is a song recorded by South Korean boy group Zerobaseone for their debut extended play (EP) Youth in the Shade. It was released as the lead single from the EP by WakeOne on July 10, 2023.

== Background and release ==
On June 7, 2023, WakeOne confirmed through a title poster that the group would be releasing their debut EP, Youth in the Shade on July 10.

On July 3, 2023, a title song poster revealed "In Bloom" as the title track for Youth in the Shade. On July 6, the first music video teaser for "In Bloom" was released and an audio snippet of the song was also released on TikTok. The second music video teaser for "In Bloom" was released on July 9. On July 10, Zerobaseone released the song alongside the music video and the EP's release.

== Composition ==
"In Bloom" was written by Seo Young-joon, Danke, Jo Yoon-kyung, Yi Yi-jin, Seo Ji-eum, Rum (MUMW) and Jeon Hye-hyung (MUMW), produced by Imsuho, Niko, MLC, and Gabriel Brandes, and arranged by Imsuho and Niko. It is a drum and bass and synth-pop song that samples the main riff from the 1984 single "Take On Me" from the Norwegian synth-pop band a-ha. The lyrics describe the members having the courage to take their first meaningful step as a group, while being aware of an inevitable end, as they are determined to run to you. The song is composed in the key of F-sharp major with a tempo of 82 beats per minute.

== Music video ==
The music video showcases the members going on a journey to gather and deliver flowers to the viewers after waking up in a room filled with overgrown plants. The group encounter various obstacles that they must overcome when they are suddenly transported into a video game-esque world, such as having to go through different levels and dealing with error codes along the way, but are successful in delivering the flowers as they are shown in a room filled with flowers at the end of the video. The music video received 6.1 million views on YouTube in the first 24 hours of its release.

== Critical reception ==
Business Insider ranked it number 8 in their list of the best K-pop songs of 2023 while Dazed placed it at 22 in their list of Top 50 best K-pop tracks of 2023. The song was also included in the Billboard list of 25 best K-pop songs of 2023, praising the choice to sample the main riff from "Take On Me" and its resulting success in delivering something familiar and, at the same time, a message for the fans.

== Accolades ==
Awards and nominations for "In Bloom"
Award ceremony	Year	Category	Result	Ref.
Circle Chart Music Awards	2023	Rookie of the Year – Global Streaming	Nominated	
Circle Chart Music Awards	2023	Rookie of the Year – Streaming Unique Listeners	Nominated	
MAMA Awards	2023	Best Dance Performance – Male Group	Nominated	
MAMA Awards	2023	Song of the Year	Longlisted	

Music program awards for "In Bloom"
Program	Date	Ref.
Show Champion	July 19, 2023	
The Show	July 18, 2023	
The Show	July 25, 2023	

== Charts ==
=== Weekly charts ===
Weekly chart performance for "In Bloom"
Chart (2023)	Peak position
Global 200 (Billboard)	182
Japan (Japan Hot 100)	22
Japan Heatseekers (Billboard)	8
Japan Combined Singles (Oricon)	23
New Zealand Hot Singles (RMNZ)	29
Singapore Regional (RIAS)	26
South Korea (Circle)	38

=== Monthly charts ===
Monthly chart performance for "In Bloom"
Chart (2023)	Position
South Korea (Circle)	79

=== Yearly charts ===
Yearly chart performance for "In Bloom"
Chart (2023)	Position
South Korea Download (Circle)	157

== Release history ==
Release history for "In Bloom"
Region	Date	Format	Label
Various	July 10, 2023	Digital download; streaming	WakeOne
