= Feel the Pop =

- Japanese version cover

Single by Zerobaseone

from the EP You Had Me at Hello
- Language: Korean
- Released: May 13, 2024
- Recorded: 2024
- Genre: Pop
- Length: 2:56
- Label: WakeOne
- Composers: David Wilson; Max Schneider; Sean Douglas
- Lyricists: Kim Su-ji (Lalala Studio); Ha Yoon-a (153/Joombas); 12h51m (XYXX); Lee Hyoung-joo (Lalala Studio); Kim So-ha (Artiffect); David Wilson; Max Schneider; Sean Douglas
- Producer: Dwilly

Zerobaseone singles chronology
"Sweat" (2024)	"Feel the Pop" (2024)	"Good So Bad" (2024)

Music video
- Feel the Pop on YouTube

"Feel the Pop" is a song recorded by South Korean boy group Zerobaseone from their third extended play (EP) You Had Me at Hello. It was released as the lead single from the EP by WakeOne on May 13, 2024.

== Background and release ==
On March 31, Zerobaseone revealed a spoiler film "Summer Came Early" at the end of their special stage performance at the 2024 KCON in Hong Kong and announced that they will be releasing their third EP in May 2024, hinting a summer-themed album. On April 30, Zerobaseone revealed "Feel the Pop" as the lead single for their third EP, You Had Me at Hello. The teasers of the single was released on May 9 and 11, respectively. The single along with its music video and the EP was released on May 13, 2024.

== Composition ==
"Feel the Pop" has runtime of two minutes and 56 seconds. The song was written by David Wilson, Max Schneider, Sean Douglas, Kim Su-ji (Lalala Studio), Ha Yoon-a (153/Joombas), 12h51m (XYXX), Lee Hyoung-joo (Lalala Studio), and Kim So-ha (Artiffect). Musically, the song features an addictive pop song that mixes various rhythms such as D&B, UK garage, and Jersey club. Lyrically, it expresses the will to present the best time so that the hesitations, worries, and concerns that all young people face can be forgotten and blown away. The song is composed in the key of A major with a tempo of 149 beats per minute.

== Music video ==
The music video for "Feel the Pop" was released in conjunction with the third EP. It showcases shows the nine members transformed into cowboys. The members ride on horses and stride forward on a road covered with desert sand. Zerobaseone's cheerful progress by popping all the negative emotions in the movie-like visuals like the song's title, provides an exhilarating pleasure that makes you forget the sweltering heat for a moment.

== Promotion ==
Prior to the release of You Had Me at Hello on May 13, 2024, Zerobaseone held a media showcase to introduced the extended play and its songs, including "Feel the Pop". They subsequently performed on four music programs in the first week of promotion: Mnet's M Countdown on May 16, KBS2's Music Bank on May 17, MBC's Show! Music Core on May 18, SBS's Inkigayo on May 19, and on SBS M's The Show on May 21. In the second and final week of promotion, they performed on four music programs: M Countdown on May 23, Music Bank on May 24, Show! Music Core on May 25, Inkigayo on May 26, and The Show on May 28.

== Accolades ==
Music program awards for "Feel the Pop"
Program	Date	Ref.
The Show	May 21, 2024	
The Show	May 28, 2024	
Show Champion	May 22, 2024	
Music Bank	May 24, 2024	

== Charts ==
=== Weekly charts ===
Weekly chart performance for "Feel the Pop"
Chart (2024)	Peak position
Japan (Japan Hot 100)	62
South Korea (Circle)	82
UK Singles Downloads (Official Charts)	84
UK Singles Sales (OCC)	89

=== Monthly charts ===
Monthly chart performance for "Feel the Pop"
Chart (2024)	Position
South Korea (Circle)	180

== Release history ==
Release history for "Feel the Pop"
Region	Date	Format	Version	Label
Various	May 13, 2024	Digital download; streaming	Korean	WakeOne
Various	May 17, 2024	Digital download; streaming	Japanese	Lapone; WakeOne
