= Crush (Zerobaseone song) =

Single by Zerobaseone

from the EP Melting Point
- Language: Korean
- Released: November 6, 2023
- Recorded: 2023
- Genre: Drum and bass; Jersey club
- Length: 2:49
- Label: WakeOne
- Lyricists: Melange (Inhouse); Song-yu (Inhouse); Jeong Min-ji (Inhouse); Sunflower; Jo Yoon-kyung; Danke; Kass
- Producers: Imsuho; Niko; Chris Wahle; Ryan Lawrie; Ronnie Icon; Nicole Timms; Andreas Öhrn; Adora; Haedo (Papermaker)

Zerobaseone singles chronology
"In Bloom" (2023)	"Crush" (2023)	"Yura Yura (Unmei no Hana)" (2024)

Music video
- "Crush" on YouTube

Professional ratings
Review scores
Source	Rating
IZM	3/5 stars

"Crush" (Korean: 가시) is a song recorded by South Korean boy group Zerobaseone for their second extended play (EP) Melting Point. It was released as the lead single from the EP by WakeOne on November 6, 2023.

== Background and release ==
On August 20, 2023, WakeOne released a teaser for Zerobaseone's second EP to be released on November later that year, hinting at a winter-themed album.

On October 6, it was announced that the EP titled Melting Point would be released on November 6. The track listing was released on October 19, with the track "Crush" announced as the lead single. Teasers for the music video of "Crush" were released on November 1 and 5.

== Composition ==
"Crush" was written by Melange (Inhouse), Song-yu (Inhouse), Jeong Min-ji (Inhouse), sunfl0wer, Jo Yoon-kyung, Danke, and Kass, and produced by Imsuho, Niko, Chris Wahle, Ryan Lawrie, Ronnie Icon, Nicole Timms, Andreas Öhrn, Adora, and Haedo (Papermaker). Musically, the song features drum and bass and Jersey club rhythms. It has been described as "an intense and powerful song that summarizes Zerobaseone's commitment to take the next step". The song is composed in the key of F-sharp major with a tempo of 154 beats per minute.

== Charts ==
=== Weekly charts ===
Weekly chart performance for "Crush"
Chart (2023)	Peak position
Japan (Japan Hot 100)	65
Japan Streaming (Oricon)	44
South Korea (Circle)	88

=== Monthly charts ===
Monthly chart performance for "Crush"
Chart (2023)	Position
South Korea (Circle)	167

== Release history ==
Release history for "Crush"
Region	Date	Format	Label
Various	November 6, 2023	Digital download; streaming	WakeOne
