= List of awards and nominations received by Zerobaseone =

Zerobaseone awards and nominations
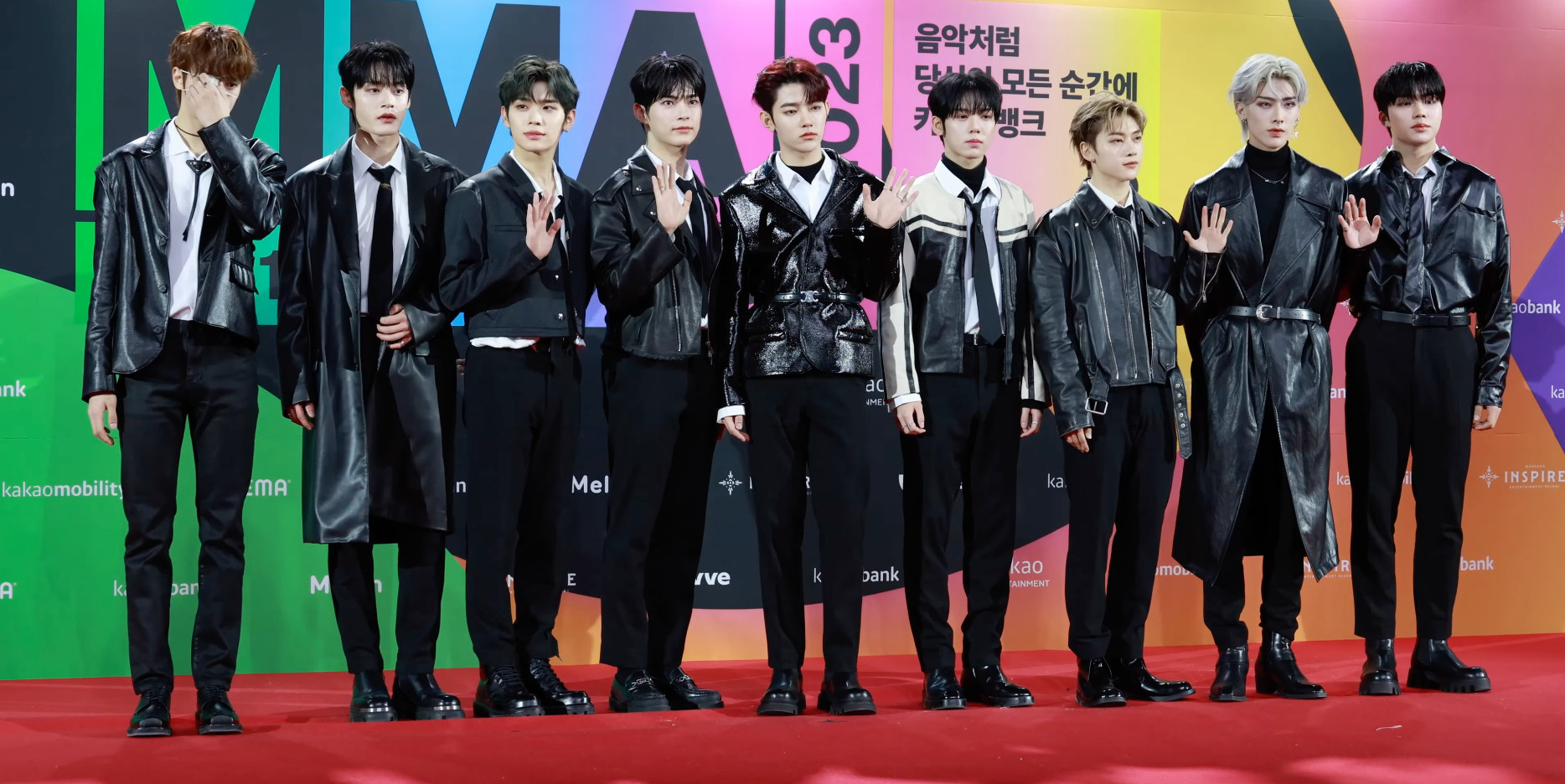
- Zerobaseone at the 2023 Melon Music Awards
Awards and nominations
Award	Wins	Nominations
Asia Artist Awards	2	4
Asia Star Entertainer Awards	3	3
Asian Pop Music Awards	2	2
Circle Chart Music Awards	1	5
D Awards	6	7
The Fact Music Awards	3	3
Golden Disc Awards	4	9
Hanteo Music Awards	3	17
iHeartRadio Music Awards	0	1
Japan Gold Disc Award	1	1
KBS Entertainment Awards	1	1
K-Global Heart Dream Awards	2	2
K-World Dream Awards	2	2
Korea First Brand Awards	2	2
Korea Grand Music Awards	2	2
MAMA Awards	7	21
Melon Music Awards	1	6
Seoul Music Awards	7	14

Totals (Note: Certain award groups do not simply award one winner. They acknowledge several different recipients, have runners-up, and have third place. Since this is a specific recognition and is different from losing an award, runner-up mentions are considered wins in this award tally. For simplification and to avoid errors, each award in this list has been presumed to have had a prior nomination.)
- Wins: 49
- Nominations: 99

Zerobaseone is a South Korean boy band formed through the Mnet reality competition program Boys Planet in 2023. Since their debut, the group has received numerous accolades from major music award ceremonies in South Korea and internationally. Zerobaseone is most notable for achieving a "Rookie Grand Slam", a term used when an artist wins the "Best New Artist" award across all major South Korean year-end ceremonies, including the Golden Disc Awards, MAMA Awards, Melon Music Awards, and Seoul Music Awards.

As of 2026, the group has earned over 40 awards. Their debut extended play (EP), Youth in the Shade, and subsequent releases have led to multiple Bonsang (Main Prize) wins at the Hanteo Music Awards and the Circle Chart Music Awards. In 2024, they received the Grand Honour's Choice (Daesang) at the inaugural Korea Grand Music Awards, and in 2025, they were awarded Record of the Year at the D Awards.

== Awards and nominations ==
Name of the award ceremony, year presented, award category, nominee(s) and the result of the award
Award ceremony	Year	Category	Nominee/work	Result	Ref.
Asia Artist Awards	2023	Best Musician Award	Zerobaseone	Won	
Asia Artist Awards	2023	Rookie of the Year – Music	Zerobaseone	Won	
Asia Artist Awards	2023	Popularity Award – Music (Male)	Zerobaseone	Nominated	
Asia Artist Awards	2024	Best Musician Award	Zerobaseone	Won	
Asia Artist Awards	2024	Best Artist Award	Zerobaseone	Won	
Asia Artist Awards	2026	Popularity Award – Group (Male)	Zerobaseone	Pending	
Asia Star Entertainer Awards	2024	The Best New Artist	Zerobaseone	Won	
Asia Star Entertainer Awards	2025	The Platinum	Zerobaseone	Won	
Asia Star Entertainer Awards	2025	Performance of the Year (Daesang)	Zerobaseone	Won	
Asian Pop Music Awards	2023	Best New Artist (Overseas)	Youth in the Shade	Won	
Asian Pop Music Awards	2024	Top 20 Songs of the Year (Overseas)	"Sweat"	Won	
Circle Chart Music Awards	2024	Rookie of the Year – Album	Youth in the Shade	Won	
Circle Chart Music Awards	2024	Artist of the Year – Album	Youth in the Shade	Nominated	
Circle Chart Music Awards	2024	Mubeat Global Choice Award – Male	Zerobaseone	Nominated	
Circle Chart Music Awards	2024	Rookie of the Year – Global Streaming	"In Bloom"	Nominated	
Circle Chart Music Awards	2024	Rookie of the Year – Streaming Unique Listeners	"In Bloom"	Nominated	
D Awards	2025	Record of the Year (Daesang)	Cinema Paradise	Won	
D Awards	2025	Delights Blue Label	Zerobaseone	Won	
D Awards	2025	Best Stage	Zerobaseone	Won	
D Awards	2025	Best Popularity Award – Boy Group	Zerobaseone	Nominated	
D Awards	2026	D Award Iconic (Daesang)	Zerobaseone	Won	
D Awards	2026	Delights Blue Label	Zerobaseone	Won	
D Awards	2026	Best Video	ICONIK	Won	
The Fact Music Awards	2023	Next Leader Award	Zerobaseone	Won	
The Fact Music Awards	2025	Artist of the Year	Zerobaseone	Won	
The Fact Music Awards	2025	World Best Performer	Zerobaseone	Won	
Golden Disc Awards	2024	Album Bonsang	Youth in the Shade	Won	
Golden Disc Awards	2024	Rookie of the Year	Zerobaseone	Won	
Golden Disc Awards	2024	Album of the Year	Youth in the Shade	Nominated	
Golden Disc Awards	2025	Album Bonsang	You Had Me at Hello	Won	
Golden Disc Awards	2025	Album Daesang	You Had Me at Hello	Nominated	
Golden Disc Awards	2025	Most Popular Artist – Male	Zerobaseone	Nominated	
Golden Disc Awards	2026	Album Bonsang	Zerobaseone	Won	
Golden Disc Awards	2026	Album Daesang (Album of the Year)	Zerobaseone	Nominated	
Golden Disc Awards	2026	Most Popular Artist – Male	Zerobaseone	Nominated	
Hanteo Music Awards	2023	Artist of the Year (Bonsang)	Zerobaseone	Won	
Hanteo Music Awards	2023	Rookie of the Year – Male	Zerobaseone	Won	
Hanteo Music Awards	2023	Global Artist – Africa	Zerobaseone	Nominated	
Hanteo Music Awards	2023	Global Artist – Asia	Zerobaseone	Nominated	
Hanteo Music Awards	2023	Global Artist – Europe	Zerobaseone	Nominated	
Hanteo Music Awards	2023	Global Artist – North America	Zerobaseone	Nominated	
Hanteo Music Awards	2023	Global Artist – Oceania	Zerobaseone	Nominated	
Hanteo Music Awards	2023	Global Artist – South America	Zerobaseone	Nominated	
Hanteo Music Awards	2023	WhosFandom Award	Zerobaseone	Nominated	
Hanteo Music Awards	2024	Artist of the Year (Bonsang)	Zerobaseone	Won	
Hanteo Music Awards	2024	Global Artist – Africa	Zerobaseone	Nominated	
Hanteo Music Awards	2024	Global Artist – Asia	Zerobaseone	Nominated	
Hanteo Music Awards	2024	Global Artist – Europe	Zerobaseone	Nominated	
Hanteo Music Awards	2024	Global Artist – North America	Zerobaseone	Nominated	
Hanteo Music Awards	2024	Global Artist – Oceania	Zerobaseone	Nominated	
Hanteo Music Awards	2024	Global Artist – South America	Zerobaseone	Nominated	
Hanteo Music Awards	2024	WhosFandom Award – Male	Zerobaseone	Nominated	
iHeartRadio Music Awards	2024	Best New K-pop Artist	Zerobaseone	Nominated	
Japan Gold Disc Award	2025	Best New Artist	Zerobaseone	Won	
KBS Entertainment Awards	2025	Digital Content Award (Note: Shared with the whole cast.)	Idol 1N2D	Won	
K-Global Heart Dream Awards	2023	K-Global Bonsang (Main Prize)	Zerobaseone	Won	
K-Global Heart Dream Awards	2023	K-Global Super Rookie Award	Zerobaseone	Won	
K-World Dream Awards	2024	K-World Dream Bonsang	Zerobaseone	Won	
K-World Dream Awards	2024	Journalist Pick Artist	Zerobaseone	Won	
Korea First Brand Awards (Note: Hosted by the Korea Consumer Brand Committee and the Korea Consumer Forum, the Korea First Brand Awards bases its winners on a nationwide South Korean survey.)	2025	Best Male Idol	Zerobaseone	Won	
Korea First Brand Awards	2026	Male Idol (Vietnam)	Zerobaseone	Won	
Korea Grand Music Awards	2024	Best Artist	Zerobaseone	Won	
Korea Grand Music Awards	2024	Grand Honour's Choice (Daesang)	Zerobaseone	Won	
KM Chart Awards	2026	ULTIMATE 12(Bonsang)	Zerobaseone	Won	
MAMA Awards	2023	Best New Male Artist	Zerobaseone	Won	
MAMA Awards	2023	Favorite New Artist	Zerobaseone	Won	
MAMA Awards	2023	Worldwide Fans' Choice Top 10	Zerobaseone	Won	
MAMA Awards	2023	Album of the Year	Youth in the Shade	Longlisted	
MAMA Awards	2023	Artist of the Year	Zerobaseone	Longlisted	
MAMA Awards	2023	Best Dance Performance – Male Group	"In Bloom"	Nominated	
MAMA Awards	2023	Song of the Year	"In Bloom"	Longlisted	
MAMA Awards	2024	Fans' Choice – Male	Zerobaseone	Won	
MAMA Awards	2024	Worldwide KCONers' Choice	Zerobaseone	Won	
MAMA Awards	2024	CJ Global Performance Award	Zerobaseone	Won	
MAMA Awards	2024	Artist of the Year	Zerobaseone	Nominated	
MAMA Awards	2024	Album of the Year	Melting Point	Nominated	
MAMA Awards	2024	Best Male Group	Zerobaseone	Nominated	
MAMA Awards	2024	Fans' Choice of the Year	Zerobaseone	Nominated	
MAMA Awards	2025	Worldwide KCONer's Choice	Blue	Won	
MAMA Awards	2025	Artist of the Year	Zerobaseone	Longlisted	
MAMA Awards	2025	Song of the Year	Doctor! Doctor!	Longlisted	
MAMA Awards	2025	Album of the Year	Zerobaseone	Longlisted	
MAMA Awards	2025	Fans' Choice of the Year	Zerobaseone	Nominated	
MAMA Awards	2025	Best Male Group	Zerobaseone	Nominated	
MAMA Awards	2025	Best Vocal Performance	Zerobaseone	Nominated	
Melon Music Awards	2023	Best New Artist	Zerobaseone	Won	
Melon Music Awards	2023	Favorite Star Award	Zerobaseone	Nominated	
Melon Music Awards	2023	Millions Top 10	Youth in the Shade	Nominated	
Melon Music Awards	2024	Millions Top 10	Melting Point	Nominated	
Melon Music Awards	2025	Millions Top 10	Blue Paradise	Nominated	
Melon Music Awards	2025	Berriz Global Fans' Choice	Zerobaseone	Nominated	
Seoul Music Awards	2024	Main Award (Bonsang)	Zerobaseone	Won	
Seoul Music Awards	2024	Grand Award (Daesang)	Zerobaseone	Nominated	
Seoul Music Awards	2024	Rookie of the Year	Zerobaseone	Won	
Seoul Music Awards	2024	Hallyu Special Award	Zerobaseone	Nominated	
Seoul Music Awards	2024	Popularity Award	Zerobaseone	Nominated	
Seoul Music Awards	2025	Main Award (Bonsang)	Zerobaseone	Won	
Seoul Music Awards	2025	Grand Prize (Daesang)	Zerobaseone	Nominated	
Seoul Music Awards	2025	Best Album Award	Blue Paradise	Won	
Seoul Music Awards	2025	Popularity Award	Zerobaseone	Nominated	
Seoul Music Awards	2025	K-Wave Special Award	Zerobaseone	Nominated	
Seoul Music Awards	2025	K-pop World Choice – Group	Zerobaseone	Nominated	
Seoul Music Awards	2026	Main Award (Bonsang)	Zerobaseone	Won	
Seoul Music Awards	2026	Best Group Award	Zerobaseone	Won	
Seoul Music Awards	2026	Best Album Award	Zerobaseone	Won	

== State and cultural honors ==
Name of country, year given, and name of honor
Country	Award ceremony	Year	Honor or award	Ref.
South Korea	Korean Popular Culture and Arts Awards	2025	Minister of Culture, Sports and Tourism Commendation	
