= Hwang Min-woo =

South Korean actor and artist

Hwang Min-Woo
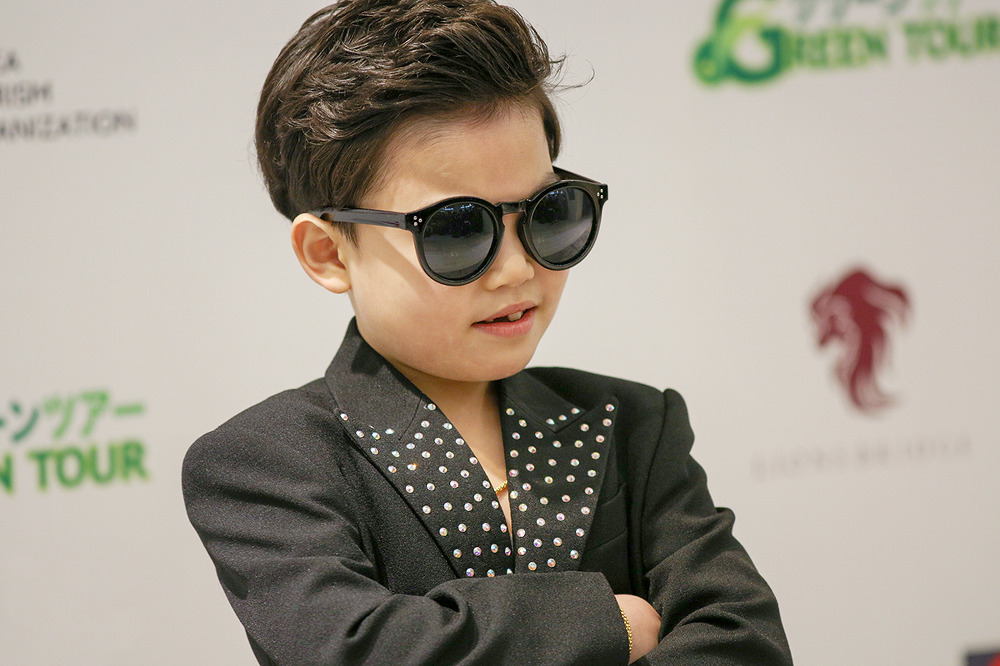
- Hwang in December 2012
- Born: Hwang Min-Woo; May 17, 2005 (age 21); South Korea
- Occupations: Actor, dancer, singer
- Years active: 2010–present
- Musical career

Hwang Min-woo (Korean: 황민우, born May 17, 2005) is a South Korean actor, singer and dancer. He is best known for his appearance in the music video for the 2012 international hit single "Gangnam Style".

== Career ==
=== National fame ===
In 2010, he rose to fame and caught the attention of the Vietnamese-South Korean media with his dance moves during the South Korean TV series Star King. He also appeared on the reality television show Korea's Got Talent, where he was praised by the judges for his stage presence and dance skills.

=== International recognition ===
After my stage performance, 10 huge American bodyguards came to protect me as people were about to run me over. I thought to myself: Am I the president?

— Hwang Min-woo's interview with ABC News

Hwang's performance on Korea's Got Talent was witnessed by the South Korean music artist PSY, who subsequently called him up to appear in the music video of "Gangnam Style".

As a result of the worldwide popularity of "Gangnam Style", Hwang has gained an international cult following and also caught the attention of foreign broadcasting networks such as CNN and ABC News, with the latter reporting that "he's now dancing in domestic awards ceremonies as a special guest, going live on national television news and even shooting commercials for companies such as LG", and that his "mounting popularity" has put him on concerts overseas in the Philippines, Hong Kong and Los Angeles." According to Soompi, he has become one of the "hottest" celebrities in K-Pop.

In February 2013, Hwang arrived in Singapore to promote the LG Optimus G smartphone. During an interview with reporters, he expressed his desire to step away from "Gangnam Style" and disclosed the title of his single, "Showtime".

== Filmography ==
=== Variety show ===
- Star King (2010)
- Korea's Got Talent (2011)
- Tralala Brothers (2023)
- Mr. Lotto (2023)

=== Music video appearance ===
- "Gangnam Style" by Psy (2012)

== Personal life ==
Hwang's father is South Korean and his mother is a Vietnamese woman named Vu Thi Ly. In 2012, Hwang was selected as one of the 10 recipients of South Korea's 1st "Multicultural Youth Awards" launched by the Korea Times to recognize contributions made by people who have enhanced the cultural diversity of South Korea. However, due to the prevalence of racism in South Korea, his family has had to take legal action against those who have bullied him over his ancestral heritage.

During an interview with the news agency Reuters, Hwang revealed that he aspires to become a "global star" and surpass Psy's popularity in the future.
