= Kim Jae-hwan (singer) =

South Korean musician (born 1996)

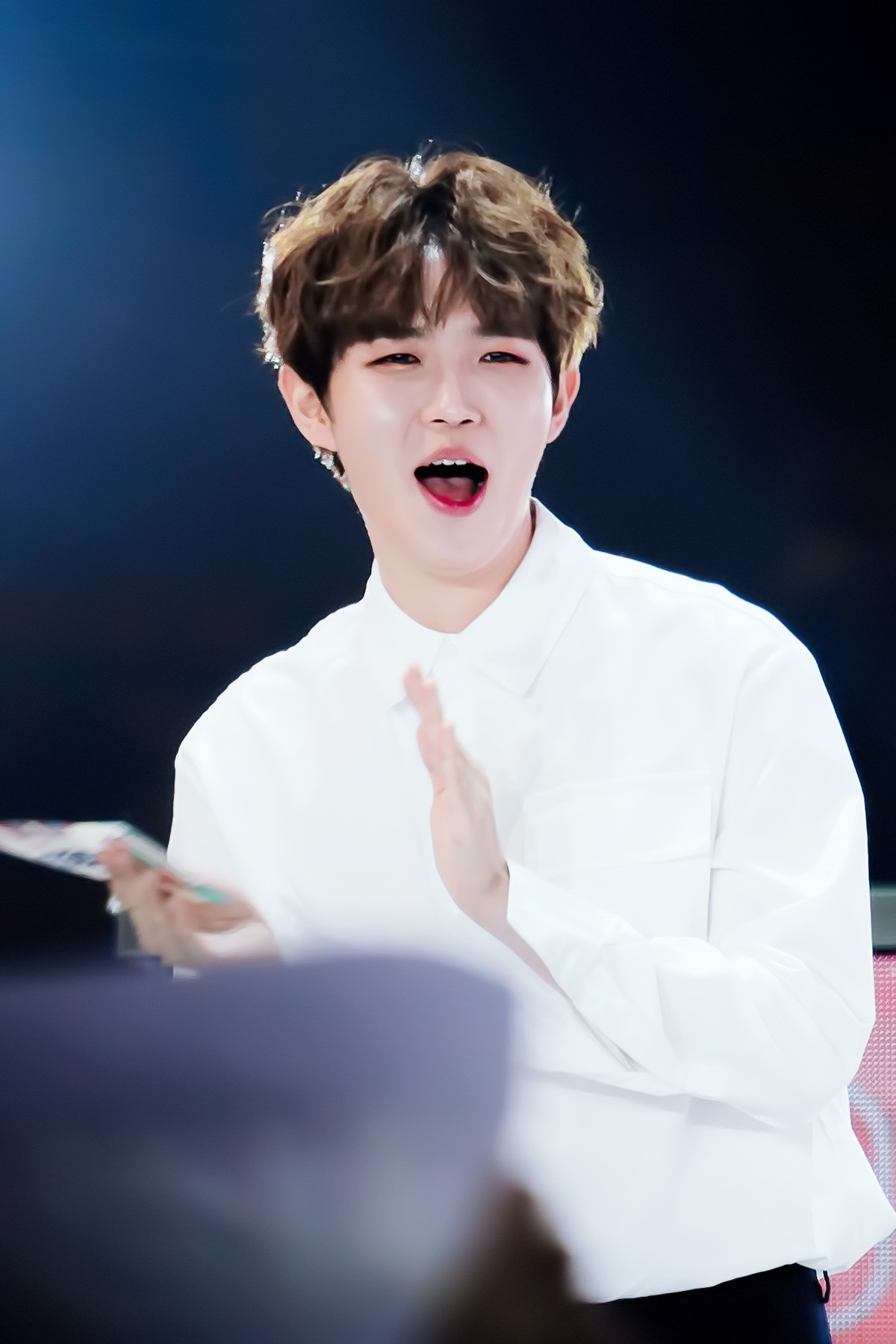
- Kim in October 2017
- Born: May 27, 1996 (age 30); Seoul, South Korea
- Education: Howon University
- Occupation: Singer-songwriter
- Musical career
- Genre: K-pop
- Instruments: Vocals; guitar
- Years active: 2017–present
- Labels: YMC; Swing; WakeOne
- Formerly of: Wanna One

Korean name
- Hangul: 김재환
- Hanja: 金在奐
- RR: Gim Jaehwan
- MR: Kim Chaehwan
- Website: wake-one.com/artists/kim_jae-hwan

Signature
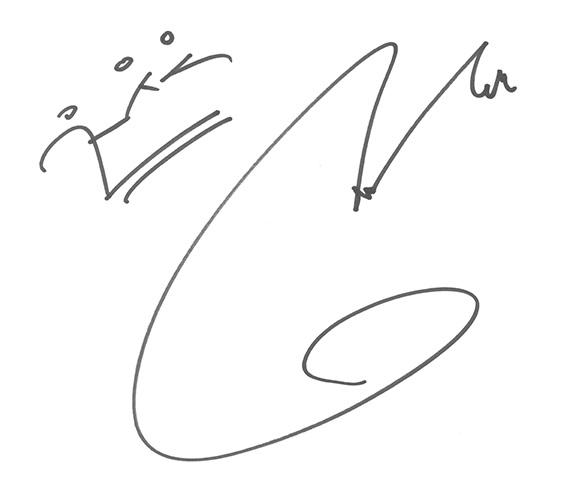

Kim Jae-hwan (Korean: 김재환, born May 27, 1996), known mononymously as Jaehwan (재환), is a South Korean singer-songwriter, known for finishing fourth in Produce 101 (season 2). He is a former member of the South Korean boy group Wanna One. As the group promoted for a year and a half, it achieved both critical and commercial success with all four of its albums topping South Korea's Gaon Album Chart and all five of its lead singles ranking in the top three of South Korea's Gaon Digital Chart.

Kim debuted as a soloist with his first extended play, Another, which was released on May 20, 2019.

== Career ==
=== 2012–2016: Career beginnings ===
Kim Jae-hwan first appeared in 2012 as a contestant in the second season of Korea's Got Talent. He auditioned in Daegu with his own rendition of Miss A's "Bad Girl Good Girl" but did not advance to the next round. However, judge Kim Gura made a special request to let Kim audition again in Seoul, where he received the two votes needed to continue in the show. He made it to the semi-finals before being eliminated.

After the show, (Note: When Kim Jae-hwan participated SBS' Vocal War: God's Voice in 2016, it was reported that he has been a trainee for four years. It can be inferred that he joined The Music Works in 2012.) Kim became a trainee under The Music Works and was selected to be one of the four members of ShelRock (셜록), a "hybrid rock" band produced by singer Baek Ji-young. (Note: Excerpt: 셜록은 '미남 테란' 민찬기를 포함해, 리더 이재, 매튜, 재환까지 4명으로 구성 된 하이브리드 록밴드다. Rough translation: ShelRock is a hybrid band with four members: Min Chin-ki, Leader EJ, Matthew, and Jae-hwan.) The band frequently busked on the streets of Hongdae and held guerilla performances at different high schools around Seoul to promote the band prior to their debut. They even made an appearance on Yang Song E's music video for her debut single "Smiling Goodbye" (웃으며 안녕). Unfortunately, in August 2015, debut plans fell through, and ShelRock disbanded. Kim eventually left The Music Works.

In 2016, Kim appeared on the pilot episode of SBS' Vocal War: God's Voice. He challenged veteran singer Yoon Do-hyun with his own rendition of YB's "Autumn Outside the Post Office" (가을 우체국 앞에서) and won, becoming the show's first winner. In the next round, he challenged Lena Park with a cover of Park's "Sorry" (미안해) but did not win, eliminating him as a contestant.

=== 2017–2018: Produce 101 and Wanna One ===
Kim participated in the second season of Produce 101 as one of the five "individual trainees" (개인 연습생), or trainees not signed under an agency. He quickly garnered attention for his strong vocal skills during the first round, where he performed Super Junior's "Sorry, Sorry". He continued to impress the audiences in his subsequent performances, especially during the performance of "Never", which was written by Hui, E'Dawn, and Wooseok and produced by Hui with Flow Blow. This led to Kim finishing fourth in the finale with 1,051,735 votes and securing him a spot in Wanna One.

Kim officially debuted with Wanna One during Wanna One Premier Show-Con on August 7, 2017, at the Gocheok Sky Dome with the group's first mini-album 1×1=1 (To Be One). The following day, on August 8, it was reported that Kim signed an exclusive contract with CJ E&M to become an official artist under the company after the group's disbandment at the end of 2018.

On December 31, 2018, Wanna One disbanded, and Kim made his final appearance as a member of the group during their final concert named Therefore 2019.

=== 2019–2022: Solo debut ===
In 2019, Kim signed with Swing Entertainment, which previously managed Wanna One. Kim's debut extended play, Another, accompanied with the title track "Begin Again", was released on May 20, 2019. His second extended play, Moment, accompanied with the double title tracks "The Time I Need" and "Nuna", was released on December 12, 2019.

On April 7, 2021, Kim released his third extended play Change, accompanied with the title track "I Wouldn't Look For You".

On December 27, 2021, Kim released his fourth extended play The Letter, accompanied with the title track "Unforgettable".

On June 5, 2022, Kim released the digital single "Snail".

On July 13, 2022, Kim released "Delete", a cover of the song by Lee Seung-gi, as part of the Additional Memory Project.

On July 12, 2022, his agency announced that Kim would hold the 2022 Kim Jae Hwan fan concert 'I_My_Me_Mine' at the Blue Square Mastercard Hall in Hannam-dong, Seoul on August 20.

=== 2022–present: Empty Dream, J.A.M (Journey Above Music) and I Adore ===
On September 5, 2022, Kim released his fifth mini album Empty Dream.

In February 2023, Kim collaborated with Park Woo-jin on the song "Self-Portrait", which was released on February 15. On March 20, 2023, Kim released his single "Spring Breeze".

On June 20, 2023, Kim released his sixth mini album J.A.M. (Journey Above Music).

On September 21, 2023, it was announced that WakeOne will handle all Kim's activities.

In November, Kim released a remake of "I Love You", a song that received much love in Korea when it was remade in 2000 and is a song by the late Japanese national singer Yutaka Ozaki, scheduled for release on the 11th.

== Discography ==
=== Extended plays ===
Title	EP details	Peak chart positions	Sales
Title	EP details	KOR	Sales
Another	Released: May 20, 2019; Label: Swing Entertainment; Formats: CD, digital download, streaming; Track listing: 1. "Love You Still" (그렇게 널); 2. "My Star"; 3. "Begin Again" (안녕하세요); 4. "Blow Me"; 5. "Designer" (디자이너); 6. "Melodrama" (랄라)	2	KOR: 104,293
Moment	Released: December 12, 2019; Label: Swing Entertainment; Formats: CD, digital download, streaming; Track listing: 1. "The Time I Need" (시간이 필요해); 2. "After Party"; 3. "Nuna" (누나); 4. "Who Am I"; 5. "Paradise" (파라다이스) (featuring Park Woo-jin of AB6IX); 6. "Zzz"	2	KOR: 66,228
Change	Released: April 7, 2021; Label: Swing Entertainment; Formats: CD, digital download, streaming; Track listing: 1. "Pray"; 2. "I Wouldn't Look for You" (찾지 않을게); 3. "Without You" (그대가 없어도 난 살겠지) (featuring Hynn); 4. "Blue Moon"; 5. "My Flower" (꽃인가요); 6. "Get Antsy" (애가타); 7. "Lululala" (신이나); 8. "Letter to You" (손편지)	8	KOR: 49,877
The Letter	Released: December 27, 2021; Label: Swing Entertainment; Formats: CD, digital download, streaming; Track listing: 1. "Voice of a Star" (별의 목소리); 2. "Unforgettable" (다 잊은 줄 알았어); 3. "We Are Never Meant to Be Again" (우리 사랑은 다시 이뤄지지 않아); 4. "SuperMario" (슈퍼마리오); 5. "Winter Fairy Tale" (겨울동화)	3	KOR: 30,880
Empty Dream	Released: September 5, 2022; Label: Swing Entertainment; Formats: CD, digital download, streaming; Track listing: 1. "Answer Me" (대답해줘); 2. "Back Then" (그 시절 우리는); 3. "Out of Line" (삐뚤어질까요); 4. "Oasis"; 5. "Love Strike"; 6. "Goodbye Morning"	7	KOR: 37,656
J.A.M. (Journey Above Music)	Released: June 20, 2023; Label: Swing Entertainment; Formats: CD, digital download, streaming	11	KOR: 43,186
I Adore	Released: May 8, 2024; Label: WakeOne; Formats: CD, digital download, streaming	13	KOR: 33,218

=== Single albums ===
Title	Details	Peak chart positions	Sales
Title	Details	KOR	Sales
Spring Breeze (봄바람)	Released: March 20, 2023; Label: Swing Entertainment; Formats: CD, digital download, streaming	14	KOR: 10,015
Ponytail	Released: January 24, 2024; Label: Swing Entertainment; Formats: CD, digital download, streaming	8	KOR: 32,630
Love, from Here	Released: October 7, 2026; Label: WakeOne; Formats: CD, digital download, streaming	17	KOR: 7,406

=== Singles ===
==== As lead artist ====
Title	Year	Peak chart positions		Album
Title	Year	KOR	KOR Hot	Album
"Begin Again" (안녕하세요)	2019	31	13	Another
"The Time I Need" (시간이 필요해)	2019	107	—	Moment
"Nuna" (누나)	2019	—	—	Moment
"Goodbye" (안녕)	2020	27	33	Non-album singles
"I'm Not Okay" (안녕 못 해)	2020	63	75	Non-album singles
"I Wouldn't Look for You" (찾지 않을게)	2021	90	—	Change
"Burned All Black" (새까맣게)	2021	110	—	Non-album single
"Unforgettable" (다 잊은 줄 알았어)	2021	59	—	The Letter
"Snail" (달팽이)	2022	91	—	Non-album single
"Back Then" (그 시절 우리는)	2022	82	—	Empty Dream
"Spring Breeze" (봄바람)	2023	199	—	Spring Breeze and J.A.M. (Journey Above Music)
"Lucky!" (개이득) (featuring Bobby)	2023	152	—	J.A.M. (Journey Above Music)
"Ponytail"	2024	109	—	Ponytail and I Adore
"Amaid" (prod. Dynamic Duo, Padi)	2024	130	—	I Adore
"—" denotes items that did not chart or were not released in that region.

==== Collaborations ====
Title	Year	Peak chart positions		Album
Title	Year	KOR	KOR Hot	Album
"Vacance in September" (with Stella Jang)	2019	—	—	Pocket List 8/12
"Cold" (봄 같던 그녀가 춥대) (with MC Mong, feat. Penomeco)	2020	35	30	Non-album singles
"Weekends Without You" (주말이 싫어졌어) (with Hynn)	2021	145	—	Non-album singles
"—" denotes items that did not chart or were not released in that region.

=== Soundtrack appearances ===
Title	Year	Peak chart positions		Album
Title	Year	KOR	KOR Hot	Album
"Black Sky"	2019	—	—	Chief of Staff OST Part 2
"If I Was"	2019	—	—	Vagabond OST Part 9
"Someday" (어떤 날엔)	2020	18	17	Crash Landing on You OST Part 5
"You're My End and My Beginning" (with Lim Han-byul)	2020	152	66	The King: Eternal Monarch OST Part 13
"What If"	2020	120	—	Record of Youth OST Part 5
"Every Moment" (모든 순간에)	2020	—	—	Bunny & The Boys OST
"Promise You"	2021	—	—	Voice 4 OST Part 5
"Be the Light" (빛이 되어줘)	2021	91	—	Hometown Cha-Cha-Cha OST Part 5
"Talk To Me" (나에게 말해요)	2022	—	—	Soundtrack #1 OST
"How I Feel"	2022	—	—	Sh**ting Stars OST
"Cinderella's Love" (신데렐라스 러브)	2022	—	—	Jojo Comics OST
"Be My Wind" (바람이 되어줘요)	2024	—	—	Love Song for Illusion OST Part 5
"—" denotes releases that did not chart or were not released in that region.

=== Other songs ===
Title	Year	Peak chart positions	Album
Title	Year	KOR	Album
"Autumn in Front of the Post Office"	2016	—	Vocal War: God's Voice
"Sorry"	2016	—	Vocal War: God's Voice (Part 1)
"Rebecca"	2019	—	Two Yoo Project - Sugar Man 3
"Delete" (삭제)	2022	160	Additional Memory Project
"—" denotes releases that did not chart or were not released in that region.

=== Other charted songs ===
Title	Year	Peak chart positions	Album
Title	Year	KOR	Album
"Love You Still" (그렇게 널)	2019	148	Another
"My Star"	2019	193	Another

=== Composition credits ===
All song credits are adapted from the Korea Music Copyright Association's database unless stated otherwise.

List of songs, showing year released, artist name, and name of the album
Title	Year	Artist	Album	Lyricist	Composer
"Love You Still" (그렇게 널)	2019	Kim Jae-hwan	Another	Yes	Yes
"My Star"	2019	Kim Jae-hwan	Another	Yes	Yes
"Begin Again" (안녕하세요)	2019	Kim Jae-hwan	Another	Yes	Yes
"Blow Me"	2019	Kim Jae-hwan	Another	No	Yes
"Designer" (디자이너)	2019	Kim Jae-hwan	Another	Yes	Yes
"Melodrama" (랄라)	2019	Kim Jae-hwan	Another	No	Yes
"Strange" (이상해)	2019	Park Ji-hoon	360	Yes	Yes
"The Time I Need" (시간이필요해)	2019	Kim Jae-hwan	Moment	Yes	Yes
"After Party"	2019	Kim Jae-hwan	Moment	Yes	Yes
"Nuna" (누나)	2019	Kim Jae-hwan	Moment	No	Yes
"Who Am I"	2019	Kim Jae-hwan	Moment	Yes	Yes
"Paradise" (파라다이스)	2019	Kim Jae-hwan feat. Park Woo-jin	Moment	Yes	Yes
"Zzz"	2019	Kim Jae-hwan	Moment	Yes	Yes
"Why'd You Leave Me (왜, 너만)"	2021	Seo Eun-kwang	Replay: The Moment OST	Yes	Yes
"Blue Moon"	2021	Kim Jae-hwan	Change	No	Yes
"Letter To You" (손편지)	2021	Kim Jae-hwan	Change	Yes	Yes
"Pray"	2021	Kim Jae-hwan	Change	Yes	Yes
"Get Angsty" (애가타)	2021	Kim Jae-hwan	Change	Yes	Yes
"My Flower" (꽃인가요)	2021	Kim Jae-hwan	Change	Yes	Yes
"I Wouldn't Look For You" (찾지않을게)	2021	Kim Jae-hwan	Change	No	Yes
"Lululala" (신이나)	2021	Kim Jae-hwan	Change	Yes	Yes
"Winter Fairy Tale" (겨울동화)	2021	Kim Jae-hwan	The Letter	Yes	Yes
"Unforgettable" (다 잊은 줄 알았어)	2021	Kim Jae-hwan	The Letter	Yes	Yes
"Voice Of A Star" (별의 목소리)	2021	Kim Jae-hwan	The Letter	Yes	Yes
"We Are Never Meant To Be Again" (우리 사랑은 다신 이뤄지지 않아)	2021	Kim Jae-hwan	The Letter	Yes	Yes
"Super Mario" (슈퍼마리오)	2021	Kim Jae-hwan	The Letter	Yes	Yes
"Answer Me" (대답해줘)	2022	Kim Jae-hwan	Empty Dream	Yes	Yes
"Oasis"	2022	Kim Jae-hwan	Empty Dream	Yes	Yes
"Back Then" (그 시절 우리는)	2022	Kim Jae-hwan	Empty Dream	Yes	Yes
"Goodbye Morning"	2022	Kim Jae-hwan	Empty Dream	Yes	Yes
"Out Of Line" (삐뚤어질까요)	2022	Kim Jae-hwan	Empty Dream	Yes	Yes
"Love Strike"	2022	Kim Jae-hwan	Empty Dream	Yes	Yes
"Ponytail"	2024	Kim Jae-hwan	Ponytail and I Adore	Yes	Yes

== Filmography ==
=== Television shows ===
Year	Title	Role	Notes	Ref.
2012	Korea's Got Talent 2	Contestant	Semifinalist	
2016	Vocal War: God's Voice	Contestant	Winner of 1st episode	
2017	Produce 101 (season 2)	Contestant	Finished at 4th place	
2017	Immortal Songs: Singing the Legend	Performer	Ep. 323, 330	
2018	King of Mask Singer	Contestant (Royal Guard)	Ep. 149–150	
2019	Wednesday Music Playlist	Cast member		
2019	Immortal Songs: Singing the Legend	Performer	Ep. 401, 403, 419	
2020	Law of the Jungle in Palawan	Cast member	Ep. 411-415	
2020	My Music Teacher, Mingalabar	Cast member		
2020	Telegna	Cast member	Pilot Episode	
2020	A Good Day To Go To Market	Cast member		
2020–2021	Life Album – Yesterday	Host		
2021	Immortal Songs: Singing the Legend	Performer	Ep. 491, 496–497	
2021	Singstay	Host	Season 3	
2022	legendfestival	Participant		
2022	Great Seoul Invasion	Consultant		
2022	Show! Music Core	Special host	June 11, 2022	
2022	Sports Golden Bell	Contestant	Chuseok Special	
2023	Boys Planet	Star master	Ep. 11	
2023	R U Next?	Coach		
2024	Build Up: Vocal Boy Group Survival	Judge		

=== Web shows ===
Year	Title	Role	Ref.
2020	Boy's Mental Camp	Cast member	
2021	Sing Stay 2	Host	

=== Radio shows ===
Year	Title	Role	Note	Ref.
2021–2022	Listen	DJ	September 5, 2021 – July 2022	
2022	Idol Radio Season 2	Temporary DJ	July 11 and July 14	

== Awards and nominations ==
Name of the award ceremony, year presented, category, nominee of the award, and the result of the nomination
Organization	Year	Category	Recipient	Result	Ref.
APAN Music Awards	2021	APAN Choice Award – Best Vocalist	Kim Jae-hwan	Won	
Asia Artist Awards	2019	StarNews Popularity Award	Kim Jae-hwan	Nominated	
Asia Artist Awards	2021	Male Solo Singer Popularity Award	Kim Jae-hwan	Nominated	
Genie Music Awards	2019	Rookie of the Year	Kim Jae-hwan	Nominated	
Genie Music Awards	2019	Next Generation Star	Kim Jae-hwan	Won	
Golden Disc Awards	2020	Album Bonsang	Another	Nominated	
Golden Disc Awards	2020	Popularity Award	Kim Jae-hwan	Nominated	
Golden Disc Awards	2020	Rookie of the Year	Kim Jae-hwan	Nominated	
Golden Disc Awards	2020	Next Generation Artist	Kim Jae-hwan	Won	
K-Global Heart Dream Awards	2023	K-Global Best Vocal award	Kim Jae-hwan	Won	
Melon Music Awards	2019	Hot Trend Award	Kim Jae-hwan	Nominated	
Mnet Asian Music Awards	2019	Best New Male Artist	Kim Jae-hwan	Nominated	
Mnet Asian Music Awards	2019	Best Vocal Performance – Solo	Begin Again	Nominated	
Mnet Asian Music Awards	2019	Song of the Year	Begin Again	Nominated	
Seoul Music Awards	2019	Ballad Award	Begin Again	Won	
Seoul Music Awards	2020	Main Prize	Kim Jae-hwan	Nominated	
Seoul Music Awards	2020	Ballad Award	Goodbye	Nominated	
Soribada Best K-Music Awards	2019	Main Prize (Bonsang)	Another	Won	
Soribada Best K-Music Awards	2020	New K-Wave Voice	Kim Jae-hwan	Won	
