= Gravity, Completed =

EP (reissue) by KNK
- Released: July 20, 2017
- Genre: K-pop; R&B; soul; dance
- Language: Korean
- Label: YNB Entertainment; CJ E&M Music (Distribution)

KNK chronology
Remain (2016)	Gravity, Completed (2017)	U / Back Again (2017)

Singles from Gravity, Completed
- 1. "Rain" Released: July 20, 2017

Gravity, Completed is the reissue of the band's second single album, Gravity by South Korean boy band KNK. The reissue (EP) contains six songs including the lead single, "Rain".

== Background and release ==
On May 25, 2017, KNK released a single album titled Gravity which contains "Think About You", "Love You" and its lead single "Sun, Moon, Star". The group promoted the album from May to June.

On July 7, YNB Entertainment made a surprise announcement of KNK's comeback with a new album, a reissue of Gravity titled Gravity, Completed, set to be released on the 20th. Three days later, a promotion plan schedule and individual image teasers of the members were revealed. On July 12–13, individual video teasers of the members were released, while the music video teaser for the title track titled "Rain" was uploaded on the 14th. On July 17–18, the track list and a preview of the album were unveiled respectively, revealing that KNK's member Youjin wrote and co-composed the second track titled "Good Night", while the third track titled "Feel So Good" was written and co-composed by Heejun. All other tracks were produced by Kim Tae-joo, who has been working with KNK since Awake era. The album was officially released on July 20, 2017. It was also released as a digital download on various music portals.

== Promotion ==
KNK held their comeback stage on the July 20th episode of M Countdown. It was then followed by comeback stages on the July 21st episode of Music Bank, 22nd on Show! Music Core, 23rd on Inkigayo, 25th on The Show and 26th on Show Champion.

== Track listing ==
No.	Title	Lyrics	Music	Arrangement	Length
1.	"Rain" (비)	Kim Tae-joo	Kim Tae-joo	Kim Tae-joo
2.	"Good Night" (이 밤이 지나면)	Kim You-jin	Kim You-jin; Kim Tae-joo	Kim Tae-joo
3.	"Feel So Good"	Oh Hee-jun	Oh Hee-jun; Kim Tae-joo	Kim Tae-joo
4.	"Think About You"	Kim Tae-joo	Kim Tae-joo	Kim Tae-joo
5.	"Love You" (너무 예뻐)	Kim Tae-joo	Kim Tae-joo	Kim Tae-joo
6.	"Sun, Moon, Star" (해, 달, 별)	Kim Tae-joo	Kim Tae-joo	Kim Tae-joo

== Release history ==
Region	Date	Format	Distributor
South Korea, Worldwide	July 20, 2017	digital download	YNB Entertainment, CJ E&M Music
South Korea	July 20, 2017	CD	YNB Entertainment, CJ E&M Music
