= Korea's Got Talent season 1 =

Korea's Got Talent
- Season 1

Release
- Original network: tvN
- Original release: 4 June – 20 August 2011

Season chronology
- Next → Season 2

Korea's Got Talent is a South Korean reality television show that was first broadcast on 4 June 2011 on tvN. The show is based on the Got Talent series format, originating with Britain's Got Talent. This is the show's first series in Korea. The judges are Kolleen Park, Jang Jin and Song Yun-ah.

The show started accepting applicants on 9 February 2011 via ARS, the official website, and smart phone apps. The show held regional auditions nationwide starting in Busan on 2 April 2011.

The show became famous around the world after a video of Sung-Bong Choi's appearance gained worldwide media attention.

For prizes, the semi-finalists will have the opportunity to sign with Sony Music, and the winner will receive US$100,000.

== Auditions ==
Auditions were held in Seoul, Daejeon, Gwangju, Daegu, Busan, and Incheon.

== Semifinal ==
The semi-finals are live shows with an audience. They air at 11 pm to midnight. The winner of the audience vote and a judge's choice from between the second and third place act go through to the top 10 final. In the second round, it was revealed that the judges would rank each act from 1st to 8th at the end of their performance. This has caused errors from the judges ranking one act too high thus putting a better act too low, like Jang Jin's error with I Big Harmonica Ensemble.

=== 1st Semifinal ===
Audience Voting: 96,457

Order	Performer	Act Description	Voting Percentage	Buzzes		
Order	Performer	Act Description	Voting Percentage	Kolleen Park	Song Yun-ah	Jang Jin
1	Daejeon Monsters	Martial Arts/B-boy Dance Troupe	not revealed (5th–8th place)			
2	Im Chae-Hung	Whistler	not revealed (5th–8th place)			
3	Kim Hong-Jun	Comedian	not revealed (5th–8th place)			
4	Kim Ha-Jun	Sand Animation	12.0% (3rd place)			
5	Hwang Yeong-Cheol	Beat Boxer	not revealed (5th–8th place)			
6	Jong Sin-Yeop	Fire Dancer	12.2% (2nd place)			
7	Cutie Face	Children's Dance Troupe	6.3% (4th place)	(Note: This was a joke buzz after the performance.)		
8	Choi Sung-Bong	Opera Singer	56.0% (1st place)			

=== 2nd Semifinal ===
Audience Voting: 38,321

Order	Performer	Act Description	Voting Percentage	Buzzes			Judges Ranking		
Order	Performer	Act Description	Voting Percentage	Kolleen Park	Song Yun-ah	Jang Jin	Kolleen Park	Song Yun-ah	Jang Jin
1	MonsterMG	Dance Troupe	not revealed (5th–8th place)				5th place	7th place	2nd place
2	Sung Gyu-Jing	Opera Singer	11.6% (3rd place)				4th place	1st place	4th place
3	World Taekwondo Skipping Academy	Taekwondo/Skipping	not revealed (5th–8th place)				3rd place	5th place	6th place
4	Park Jin-Yeong	Belly Dancer	not revealed (5th–8th place)				7th place	3rd place	3rd place
5	Musahwae	Object Breaking	not revealed (5th–8th place)				8th place	8th place	8th place
6	Kim Tae-Hyun	Child Singer	23.9% (2nd place)				1st place	2nd place	1st place
7	I Big Harmonica Ensemble	Harmonica Playing	30.1% (1st place)				2nd place	4th place	5th place (Note: Jang Jin apologized for ranking them lower than he should have, and that he could not rank them any higher because he had already filled out the top 4 on his rankings card.)
8	Nanjang Anpan	Traditional Korean Show	10.4% (4th place)				6th place	6th place	7th place

=== 3rd Semifinal ===
Audience Voting: 33,736

Order	Performer	Act Description	Voting Percentage	Buzzes			Judges Ranking		
Order	Performer	Act Description	Voting Percentage	Kolleen Park	Song Yun-ah	Jang Jin	Kolleen Park	Song Yun-ah	Jang Jin
1	THE BEST	Ballroom Dance Duet	not revealed (5th–8th place)				6th place	4th place	8th place
2	Jo Hoon-Sik	Singer/Action Dancer	not revealed (5th–8th place)				7th place	8th place	2nd place
3	Seo Jong-Hwan	Drummer/Beat Boxer	not revealed (5th–8th place)				5th place	3rd place	5th place
4	Jang Han-Byol	Singer	not revealed (5th–8th place)				3rd place	7th place	1st place
5	Escape	Magicians	13.7% (3rd place)				1st place	5th place	4th place
6	FusionMC	B-boy Dance Troupe	19.8% (2nd place)				4th place	1st place	7th place
7	Lee Seung-An	Musul Martial Art	9.3% (4th place)				8th place	6th place	6th place
8	Kim Chan-Yang	Dance	31.8% (1st place)				2nd place	2nd place	3rd place

=== 4th Semifinal ===
Audience Voting: 46,428

Order	Performer	Act Description	Voting Percentage	Buzzes			Judges Ranking		
Order	Performer	Act Description	Voting Percentage	Kolleen Park	Song Yun-ah	Jang Jin	Kolleen Park	Song Yun-ah	Jang Jin
1	Chumseoli	Dancing/Acting	not revealed (5th–8th place)				4th place	8th place	8th place
2	Ryu Sang-Eun	Singer	not revealed (5th–8th place)				6th place	3rd place	3rd place
3	Lee Jin-Gyu	Mind Reader	not revealed (5th–8th place)				5th place	7th place	6th place
4	Yun Jong-Ki	Two handed Yo-yo Artist	not revealed (5th–8th place)				3rd place	4th place	5th place
5	IUV	Comedians/Lipsyncing	24.7% (2nd place)				2nd place	2nd place	4th place
6	Rainbow Cheerleading Squad	Cheerleading	9.2% (4th place)				7th place	5th place	7th place
7	Joo Min-Jeong	Robotic Dancing	36.9% (1st place)				1st place	1st place	1st place
8	Cheon Sae-Bit	48-string Gayageum Player	10.6% (3rd place)				8th place	2nd place	6th place

=== 5th Semifinal ===
Audience Voting: 38,755

Order	Performer	Act Description	Voting Percentage	Buzzes			Judges Ranking		
Order	Performer	Act Description	Voting Percentage	Kolleen Park	Song Yun-ah	Jang Jin	Kolleen Park	Song Yun-ah	Jang Jin
1	Vivaglam	Dance Troupe	not revealed (5th–8th place)				2nd place	8th place	4th place
2	Yang Dae-Yong	Pianist/Comedian	not revealed (5th–8th place)				6th place	7th place	1st place
3	Song Su-Jong	Singer	not revealed (5th–8th place)				7th place	5th place	5th place
4	Park Soo-Jin	Belly-Dancer	not revealed (5th–8th place)				8th place	8th place	7th place
5	Kim Tae-Hyun	Child Drummer	15.1% (3rd place)				1st place	6th place	6th place
6	Kim Min-Ji	Singer	29.4% (1st place)				5th place	1st place	2nd place
7	Park Ki-Hoon	Robotic Dancing	14.4% (4th place)				4th place	3rd place	4th place
8	Kim Jong-Hwan	B-Boy Dancer	28.5% (2nd place)				3rd place	2nd place	3rd place

== Grand final ==
Audience Voting: 135,221

There was a placement draw held to determine the performance orders. The live finale began with Kim Ha-Joon's sand animation of the story of Japan crushing Korea's dreams, and finishing with the phrase, 'Dokdo is our territory'. Kim Tae-Hyun then sang Michael Jackson's 'Heal the World'. Kim Jong-Hwan performed a B-boy dance followed by an ABBA Medley Harmonica Performance by I Big Harmonica Ensemble. Kim Min-Ji sang 'You Raise Me Up', and then IUV lip-sync'ed a medley of songs, finishing with Cinderella, their audition song. Kim Chan-Yang displayed a sword fighting dance, and then World Sensation Choi Sung-Bong sang an encore of his DaeJeon audition performance, Nella Fantasia. Joo Min-Jeong displayed a Poppin Dance in her gold uniform, and Magicians Escape performed a magic trick where one man would go into a box, but then turns out to be a woman at the end. After 10–15 minutes of voting, the top 3 were announced. They were: IUV, Joo Min-Jeong and Choi Sung-Bong. IUV was overwhelmed with tears and despite finishing in third, they were very happy and thanked the crowd and South Korea. Then Joo Min-Jeong was announced as the winner, with her mother in the audience. Choi Sung-Bong finished 2nd. Joo Min-Jeong received 300,000,000 Korean Won, almost US$300,000. She also received a new car (Renault Samsung QM5 SUV). Choi Sung-Bong as well as other top 40 singers were given the opportunity to sign with Sony Music.

Order	Performer	Act Description	Voting Percentage	Buzzes			Judges Ranking		
Order	Performer	Act Description	Voting Percentage	Kolleen Park	Song Yun-ah	Jang Jin	Kolleen Park	Song Yun-ah	Jang Jin
1	Kim Ha-Joon	Sand Animation	not revealed (5th–10th place)				8th place	4th place	9th place
2	Kim Tae-Hyun	Child Singer	not revealed (5th–10th place)				10th place	8th place	7th place
3	Kim Jong-Hwan	B-boy Dance	not revealed (5th–10th place)				9th place	10th place	10th place
4	I Big Harmonica Ensemble	Harmonica Players	not revealed (5th–10th place)				4th place	3rd place	4th place
5	Kim Min-Ji	Singer	4th place				7th place	5th place	1st place
6	IUV	Lipsync/Comedians	3rd place				3rd place	6th place	5th place
7	Kim Chan-Yang	Acrobatic & Modern Dancer	not revealed (5th–10th place)				6th place	9th place	8th place
8	Choi Sung-Bong	Opera Singer	2nd place				5th place	1st place	2nd place
9	Joo Ming-Jong	Poppin Dance	1st place, Winner				1st place	2nd place	3rd place
10	Escape	Magicians	not revealed (5th–10th place)				2nd place	7th place	6th place
