= Korea's Got Talent season 2 =

Korea's Got Talent
- Season 2

Release
- Original network: tvN
- Original release: 1 June – 27 July 2012

Season chronology
- ← Previous; Season 1

Korea's Got Talent is a South Korean reality television show that was first broadcast in 2012 on tvN. The show is based on the Got Talent series format, originating with Britain's Got Talent. This is the show's second and final season. The judges were Kolleen Park, Jang Jin and Jang Hang-jun, and a guest judge was Kim Gura.

== Semi-finals and wildcard ==
=== Semi-final 1 ===
Order	Act	Performance description	Buzzes			Result
Order	Act	Performance description	Jang Jin	Kolleen Park	Jang Hang-jun	Result
1	Team Champion	Ballroom dancers				Advanced
2	Min-ji Yoo	Singer				Eliminated
3	JS Body	Video mapping dancers				Eliminated
4	Hyung-bin Lim	Guitarist				Eliminated
5	X-Fever	Dance group				Eliminated
6	Jae-hwan Kim	Singer/guitarist				Eliminated
7	PID	Blacklight act				Advanced

=== Semi-final 2 ===
Order	Act	Performance description	Buzzes			Result
Order	Act	Performance description	Jang Jin	Kolleen Park	Jang Hang-jun	Result
1	The Gate	Band				Eliminated
2	500–20	Singers				Eliminated
3	Selfish	Singers				Eliminated
4	Blue Whale Bros	Popping dancers				Advanced
5	Hwan Lee	Dancer				Eliminated
6	V-Star	Band				Eliminated
7	Animation Crew	Dance group				Advanced

=== Semi-final 3 ===
Order	Act	Performance description	Buzzes			Result
Order	Act	Performance description	Jang Jin	Kolleen Park	Jang Hang-jun	Result
1	Ground Jam	Band/Tap dancers				Eliminated
2	Let's Dance	Dancers				Eliminated
3	Originality Khan and Moon	Dancers				Eliminated
4	Soloists	Vocal group				Eliminated
5	Dong-ha Han	Dangerous act				Eliminated
6	Se-kwon Ahn	Opera singer				Advanced
7	Morning of Owl	Dance group				Advanced

=== Wildcard ===
Order	Act	Performance description	Buzzes			Result
Order	Act	Performance description	Jang Jin	Kolleen Park	Jang Hang-jun	Result
1	Hwan Lee	Dancer				Eliminated
2	JS Body	Dancers				Eliminated
3	5 Elements	Dance Group				Eliminated
4	Originality Khan And Moon	Dancers				Advanced

== Grand final ==
Order	Artist	Act	Result
1	PID	Blacklight act	Finalist
2	Morning of Owl	Dance Group	Finalist
3	Khan and Moon	Dancers	Finalist
4	Team Champion	Ballroom dancers	Finalist
5	Se-kwon Ahn	Opera Singer	Finalist
6	Blue Whale Bros	Popping dancers	Winner
7	Animation Crew	Dance group	Finalist

== Extrernal links ==
- Official website
