= KNK (band) =

South Korean boy band

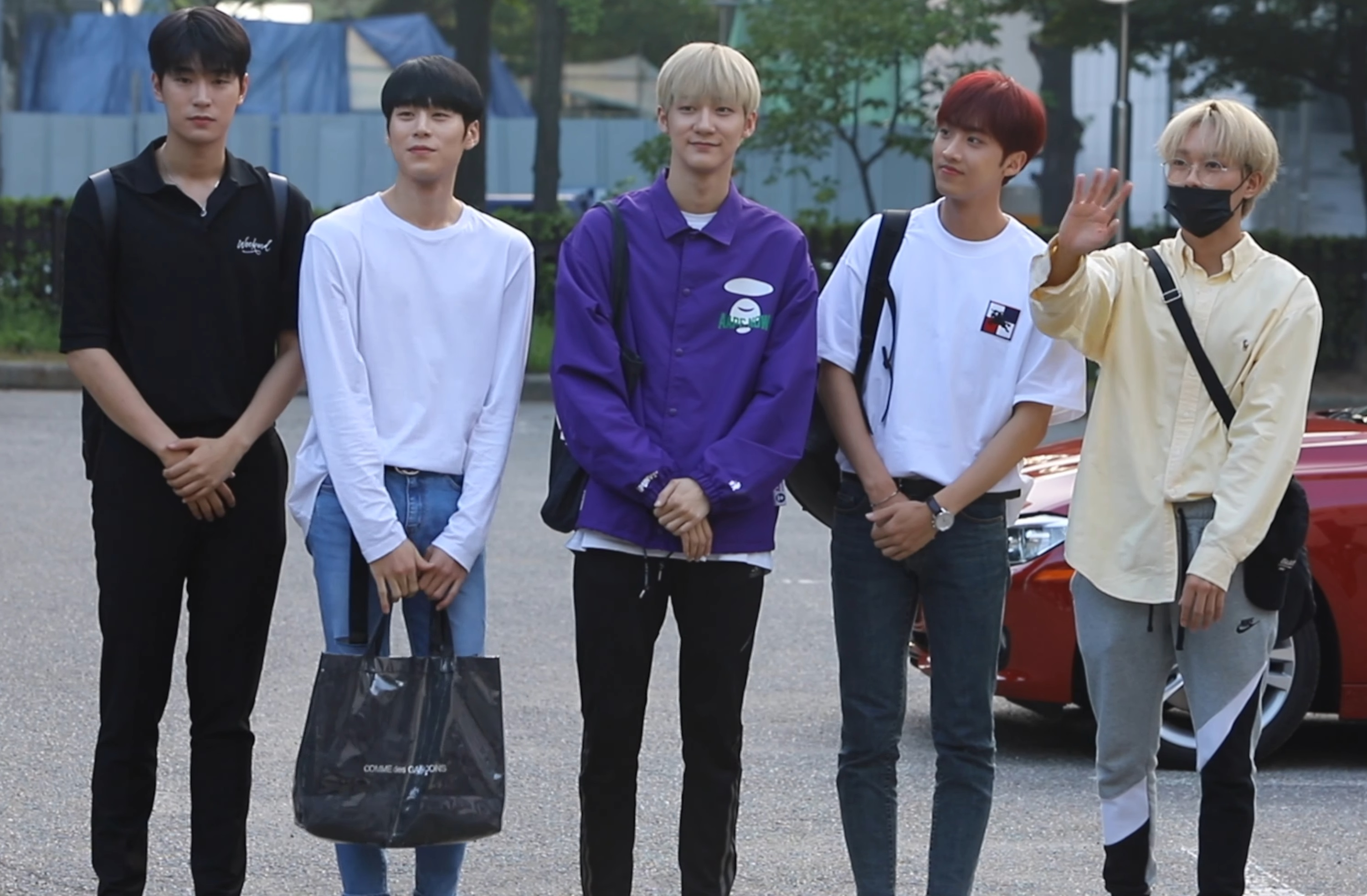
- KNK in August 2019. From left to right: Seoham, Dongwon, Jihun, Inseong, and Heejun

Background information
- Also known as: Keunakeun
- Origin: Seoul, South Korea
- Genre: K-pop
- Years active: 2016–present
- Labels: 220 Entertainment; Universal Japan
- Members: Inseong; Jihun; Hyunjong
- Past members: Youjin; Seoham; Heejun; Dongwon

KNK (Korean: 크나큰; RR: Keunakeun; lit. "great" or "to be great") is a South Korean boy band formed in 2016. They released their debut single album Knock on March 3, 2016. The group currently consists of three members: Inseong, Jihun, and Hyunjong. Originally a group of seven members, Youjin left the group in September 2018, Seoham in September 2021, Heejun in January 2022 and Dongwon in 2026.

== History ==
=== Pre-debut ===
All five members of KNK were trainees of different companies before joining YNB Entertainment. They had a long training period, with an average of five years. As trainees, the members appeared in music videos of their label mate, Bestie. They also performed as backup dancers for the girl group.

On December 15, 2015, a teaser video of the boys was uploaded on KNK's official YouTube channel. The following day, it was revealed that the group would perform at 2015 SBS Awards Festival (SAF) alongside Noel, Bestie and Almeng. On December 26, KNK performed for the first time to the public at SAF where they performed the two songs on their debut single album. On December 30, the band's first reality show, My Keunakeun Television, premiered on Naver TV Cast.

YNB Entertainment opened their official Naver V app channel for the company's artists, including KNK, on January 8, 2016. Beginning on the first day of February, KNK had real-time broadcasts for almost every day via Naver V app as a countdown to their upcoming debut. The boys showed their daily rehearsals and preparations, as well as their album jacket photo shoot and the filming for their first music video. On February 22, the company announced via SNS that the group would debut with their first single album on March 3, 2016. On February 23 to 26, the band performed in several universities' freshman orientations.

=== 2016–2018: Debut with Knock, Japanese debut, Mix Nine and addition of Lee Dong-won ===
On February 26, 2016, teaser for the music video of KNK's debut single "Knock" was released. The song was composed by production team ButterFly, led by Hwang Seong-je who composed BoA's "Atlantis Princess", Lee Soo-young's "Whistle to Me" and more, while the rap part was written by member Youjin. Furthermore, their choreography was helmed by Prepix's Ha Woo-shin and the music video was directed by Lee Ki-baek. Three days later, the band had their debut showcase at Ilchi Art Hall, Cheongdam-dong, Gangnam District, Seoul, where they performed their songs "Knock" and "Angel Heart", as well as TVXQ's "Love in the Ice" and Kim Kwang-seok's "On the Street". On March 1, KNK made their debut on The Show, the band's first performance on a television music show. Their single album and music video for "Knock" was officially released on March 3. The group had their first schedule outside of South Korea, and performed their debut single "Knock" at the 20th China Music Awards in Macau on April 15. KNK released their first digital single "I Remember" on May 16. The medium tempo R&B track was composed by Kim Tae-joo, who also produced Beast's "Good Luck", "12:30", and more. On May 23, YNB Entertainment announced the comeback of the group with their first extended play (EP), titled Awake, through KNK's official SNS channels. A group image teaser and individual photos for the EP was unveiled on May 24 and 25 respectively. Awake and the music video for title track "Back Again" was released at noon on June 2. All tracks were produced by Kim Tae-joo. The choreography for the house tempo dance track "Back Again" was arranged by Prepix's Ha Woo-shin while the choreography for the album's first track "Gone" was arranged by KNK's leader, Jihun. Awake peaked at number 14 on Billboard's World Album chart and the group was recognized by Billboard as one of the most promising K-pop debuts from the first half of 2016. On November 7, KNK's comeback with their second EP titled Remain was announced through their official SNS channels. The track list was also released on the 10th, revealing that Kim Tae-joo once again worked with KNK as the producer of the EP, while tracks "Goodbye" and "Tonight" were composed and written by members Youjin and Heejun respectively. On November 15, the music video teaser for the title track titled "U" was released, however it was announced the next day that the agency decided to dispose the music video due to quality issues. A representative stated that there were no plans to film it again. Remain was released on November 17, and KNK held their live comeback showcase the same day through Naver V Live, where they performed TVXQ's "Love in the Ice", as well as their new songs "I Know" and "U". On December 21, KNK was included on Billboard's "10 Best New K-Pop Groups in 2016" list.

In March 2017, KNK announced their first solo concert and the first stop of Asian tour. The two-day sold-out concert titled The F1rst Step was held on April 8–9 at the Shinhan Card Fan Square Live Hall in Seoul. It was then followed by concerts in Osaka, Tokyo and Taipei. On May 12, KNK announced their first comeback of the year by releasing a promotion plan poster of the group's second single album named Gravity. It features its lead single titled "Sun, Moon, Star", "Think About You" and "Love You". All songs were composed and written by Kim Tae-joo. Two days later, it was revealed that the choreography for the lead single was arranged by KNK's leader Jihun. The music video teaser for "Sun, Moon, Star" was released on May 22. Before the official release of the single album, KNK performed the lead single on the May 23 episode of The Show, and 24th on Show Champion. The album, along with the lead single's music video was released on the 25th. It was also released as a digital download on various music sites. On July 7, KNK confirmed another round of promotion with a reissue of Gravity, titled Gravity, Completed. On July 12–13, individual video teasers of the members were released, while the music video teaser for the title track titled "Rain" was uploaded on the 14th. The album, along with the music video for "Rain", was released on July 20. KNK also held their comeback stage on M Countdown the same day. In August, KNK confirmed to make their Japanese debut in October with a single titled "U / Back Again" that consists of their two previous released title tracks from their EPs Awake and Remain respectively. The CD single has three versions; Standard Edition, Limited Edition A and Limited Edition B. On October 3, the group released the performance video of "U (Japanese version)". The single album was officially released on October 11. On September 29, it was announced that the group had joined the JTBC and YG Entertainment survival show titled Mix Nine. KNK's agency posted a statement on their fan cafe to announce that they had received an offer from the producers of Mix Nine and after a long time of consideration and discussion by the agency and the group, it was decided that all the members would appear on the show. Three members—Park Seung-jun, Jeong In-seong and Oh Hee-jun passed the audition and competed with other contestants but was later eliminated and did not make it to the finale.

On April 19, 2018, YNB Entertainment announced that KNK member Kim Youjin had been diagnosed with a panic disorder, and as a result of this, KNK would continue to promote temporarily as a 4-member group while Youjin focused on recovery. On April 28, 2018, YNB Entertainment announced on the official fancafe that members Kim Jihun, Jeong Inseong and Oh Heejun would release a digital single titled "한 끗 차이" at 6 p.m. KST the same day. On September 10, 2018, the members of KNK officially terminated their contracts with YNB Entertainment, but decided to stay together as a group excluding Kim Youjin, who left the group due to a panic disorder. An official has cited long-term managerial issues within YNB Entertainment as part of the reasons for the members leaving. On October 28, 2018, Member Park Seungjun announced he had changed his name to Park Seoham after his family was against him returning to his first name Park Gyeongbok. On December 19, 2018, a representative of KNK confirmed the group would be coming back with a new member, Lee Dongwon, and would be promoting as a 5-member group. On December 20, 2018, MyMusicTaste announced KNK would embark on a U.S. tour. The tour traveled to four cities, Los Angeles, Dallas, Chicago, and New York, from February 24 – March 3, 2019.

=== 2019–2024: Lonely Night, KNK S/S Collection, KNK Airline, military service, departure and addition of new member ===
On January 7, 2019, KNK released Lonely Night and made their first comeback featuring new member Lee Dongwon. "Lonely Night” is the title track to their third single album, which includes two other songs What do you think? and “Day by Day.” Heejun co-wrote the lyrics for the title track. Heejun and Jihun co-composed Day by Day.

On June 19, 2019, MyMusicTaste announced KNK would embark on a European tour. The tour traveled to six cities, Berlin, Warsaw, London, Lisbon, Madrid and Paris from August 14–25, 2019.

On July 15, 2019, KNK returned with their new track "Sunset." "Sunset" was produced by Nassun, who has produced songs for KARD, The track is part of their fourth single album KNK S/S Collection, and also includes the songs “We Are the One,” and Fade.” The unique choreography for "Sunset" representing the fall of Icarus was created by Men of the Future (MOTF).

On August 11, 2019, Inseong appeared on the variety program, King of Masked Singer as the Astronaut.

On October 23, 2019, it was announced KNK would launch a new self-produced variety program titled 웬만해선 크나큰을 막을 수 없다 (There's No Stopping KNK).

On March 30, 2020, it was announced KNK would be launching a MAKESTAR project for its next comeback. The project was 100% funded within 10 minutes of opening. On September 17, KNK returned with their third EP KNK Airline and the title track "Ride".

On September 30, 2021, 220 Entertainment announced Park Seoham's departure from the group.

On October 16, Heejun made his solo debut with the digital single "Night".

On January 13, 2022, 220 Entertainment announced Oh Heejun's departure from the group, as well as Jeong Inseong's enlistment for his mandatory military service on February 8.

On February 19, 2023, Jihun personally announces that he is enlisting in March. Jihun will serve in the military as Public Service Officer.

On December 4, Kim Hyun Jong was revealed as a new member of the group.

== Members ==
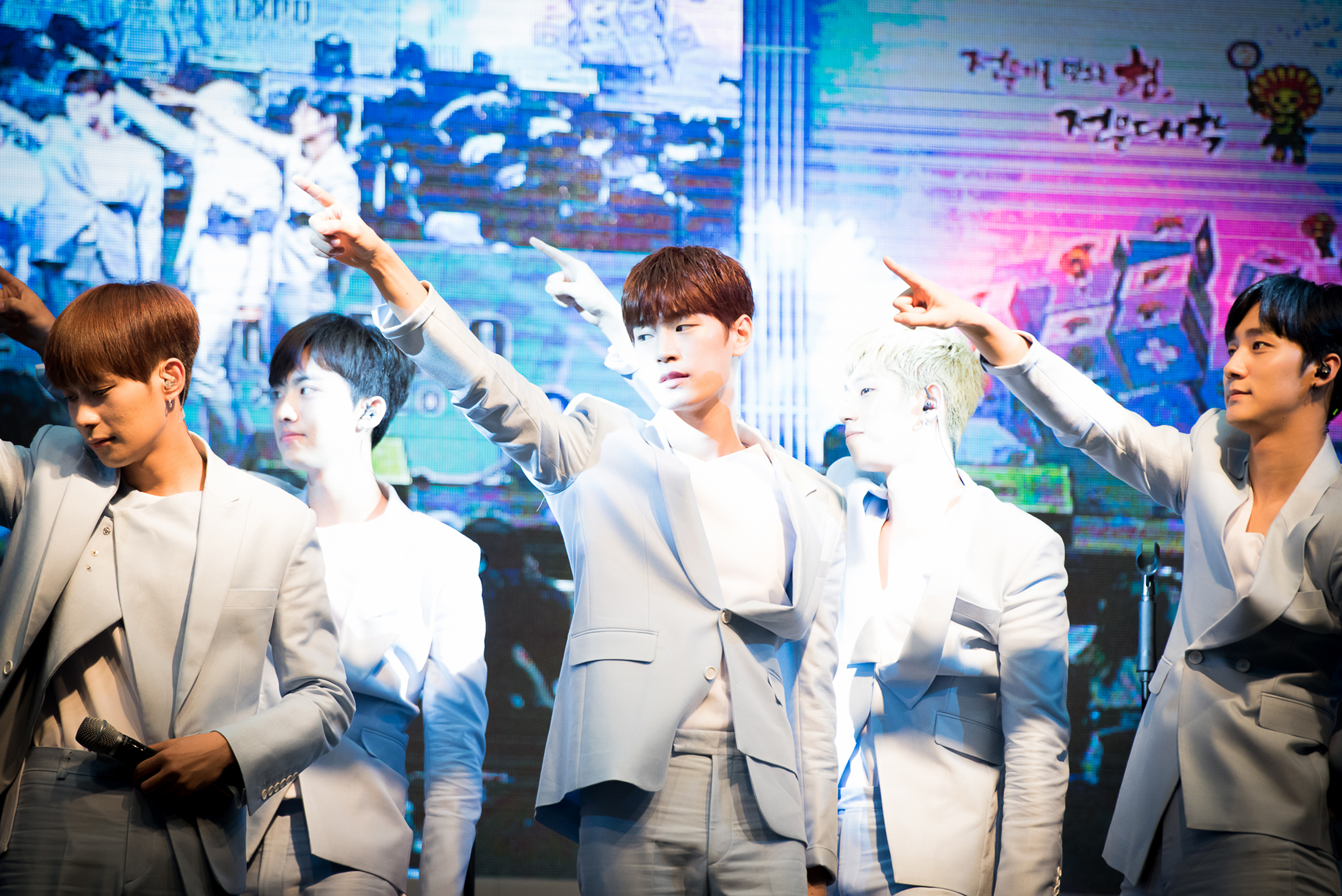
KNK performing at KBS Cool FM in July 2016

- Inseong (인성)
- Jihun (지훈)
- Hyunjong (김현종)

=== Former ===
- Youjin (유진)
- Seoham (서함)
- Heejun (희준)
- Dongwon (동원)

== Discography ==
=== Mini albums ===
Title	Details	Peak positions			Sales
Title	Details	KOR	TW	US World	Sales
Awake	Released: June 2, 2016; Label: YNB Entertainment; Format: CD, digital download	7	—	14	KOR: 12,724
Remain	Released: November 17, 2016; Label: YNB Entertainment; Format: CD, digital download	12	16	—	KOR: 12,864
KNK Airline	Released: September 17, 2020; Label: 220 Entertainment; Format: CD, digital download; Track listing: 1. "Autumn, Breeze" (바람, 가을에서); 2. "Ride"; 3. "Highway"; 4. "You Are My Reason" (이유); 5. "Time"	18	—	—	KOR: 16,119
"—" denotes releases that did not chart or were not released in that region.

=== Single albums ===
Title	Details	Peak positions			Sales
Title	Details	KOR	TW	JPN	Sales
Knock	Released: March 3, 2016 (KOR); Label: YNB Entertainment; Formats: CD, digital download; Track listing: 1. "Knock"; 2. "Angel Heart" (마음씨); 3. "Knock" (Inst.); 4. "Angel Heart" (마음씨) (Inst.)	15	—	—	KOR: 5,978
Gravity	Released: May 25, 2017 (KOR); Label: YNB Entertainment; Formats: CD, digital download; Track listing: 1. "Think About You"; 2. "Love You" (너무 예뻐); 3. "Sun, Moon, Star" (해, 달, 별); 4. "Sun, Moon, Star" (해, 달, 별) (Inst.)	6	11	—	KOR: 13,111
Gravity, Completed (repackage)	Released: July 20, 2017; Label: YNB Entertainment; Format: CD, digital download	8	7	—	KOR: 10,846
U / Back Again	Released: October 11, 2017 (JPN); Label: Universal Music Japan; Formats: CD, digital download; Track listing: 1. "U (Japanese version)" 2. "Back Again (Japanese version)" 3. "U (2017 Remastered)"; 4. "Back Again (2017 Remastered)"	—	—	7	JPN: 10,731
Lonely Night	Released: January 7, 2019 (KOR); Label: 220 Entertainment; Formats: CD, digital download; Track listing: 1. "Lonely Night"; 2. "What Do You Think?" (무슨 생각해); 3. "Day By Day"	8	18	—	KOR: 10,574
KNK S/S Collection	Released: July 15, 2019 (KOR); Label: 220 Entertainment; Formats: CD, digital download; Track listing: 1. "Sunset"; 2. "We Are the One"; 3. "Fade" (바랬 어)	8	—	—	KOR: 12,232
"—" denotes releases that did not chart or were not released in that region.

=== Singles ===
Title	Year	Peaks		Album
Title	Year	KOR	US World	Album
"Knock"	2016	—	18	Knock
"I Remember" (요즘 넌 어때)	2016	—	—	Awake
"Back Again"	2016	—	—	Awake
"U"	2016	—	—	Remain
"Sun, Moon, Star" (해, 달, 별)	2017	—	—	Gravity
"Rain" (비)	2017	—	—	Gravity, Completed
"Closer" (한 끗 차이) (Inseong, Jihun, Heejun)	2018	—	—	Non-album single
"Lonely Night"	2019	—	—	Lonely Night
"Sunset"	2019	—	—	KNK S/S Collection
"Ride"	2020	—	—	KNK Airline
"—" denotes releases that did not chart or were not released in that region.

== Filmography ==
Reality show/Variety show

- My Keunakeun Television (2015–2017, Naver TV Cast)
- My Keunakeun Television 2 (2017–2018, Naver TV Cast)
- There's No Stopping KNK (2019–present, VLIVE>)

Korean drama

- 20th Century Boy and Girl as Boys Be Ambitious (2017, MBC)

== Videography ==
=== Music videos ===
Year	Title	Director(s)	Notes
2016	"Knock"	Lee Ki-baek	
2016	"Back Again"	Lee Ki-baek	
2016	"Back Again (Dance Ver.)"	Lee Ki-baek	
2016	"U (Performance Video)"	Unknown	Unofficial music video
2017	"Sun, Moon, Star" (해, 달, 별)	Lim Seok-jin (Zanybros)	
2017	"Rain" (비)	Hong Won-ki	
2019	"Lonely Night"	Unknown	
2019	"Sunset"		
2020	"RIDE"		

== Concerts and tours ==
=== Headlining ===
- KNK Live & Meet – The F1rst Step
- KNK Summer Live Tour in Japan 2017 – Here We Are
- KNK 2018 KNOCK KNOCK SUMMER!!! in Japan
- KNK Lonely Night Tour in USA
- KNK JAPAN TOUR 2019 -Move on-
- KNK Live Tour in Japan 2019
- KNK Sunrise Tour in Europe

=== Joint tours ===
- Happy New Year 2017! Super Live Snuper & KNK in Japan

== Awards and nominations ==
=== Asia Artist Awards ===
Year	Nominee / work	Award	Result
2016	KNK	Most Popular Artists (Singer) – Top 50	38th
2017	KNK	Most Popular Artists (Singer) – Top 50	Nominated

=== Mnet Asian Music Awards ===
Year	Nominee / work	Award	Result
2016	KNK	Best New Male Artist	Nominated
2016	KNK	Artist of the Year	Nominated

=== Korean Culture Entertainment Awards ===
Year	Nominee / work	Award	Result
2016	KNK	K-pop Singer Award	Won

=== Simply K-Pop Awards ===
Year	Nominee / work	Award	Result
2016	KNK	Best Rising Star Group Of 2016	Nominated

=== Golden Disk Awards ===
Year	Nominee / work	Award	Result
2017	KNK	New Artist of the Year	Nominated
2017	KNK	Popularity Award	Nominated

=== Seoul Music Awards ===
Year	Nominee / work	Award	Result
2017	KNK	New Artist Award	Nominated
2017	KNK	Bonsang Award	Nominated
2017	KNK	Popularity Award	Nominated
2017	KNK	Hallyu Special Award	Nominated

=== V Live Awards ===
Year	Nominee / work	Award	Result
2017	KNK	Global Rookie Top 5	Won

=== Korean Entertainment Arts Awards ===
Year	Nominee / work	Award	Result
2017	KNK	Netizen Award	Won
2019	KNK	Best Group	Won

=== Soribada Best K-Music Awards ===
Year	Nominee / work	Award	Result
2017	KNK	Music Star Awards	Won
2017	KNK	Popularity Award	Nominated

=== FANN STAR ===
Year	Nominee / work	Award	Result
2018	KNK	Rising Star Award	Won
