= K-World Dream Awards =

Annual South Korean music awards

- Current: 2026 K-World Dream Awards
- Awarded for: Outstanding achievements in the music industry
- Location: Seoul
- Country: South Korea
- Presented by: TV Daily
- Formerly called: Soribada Best K-Music Awards (2017–2020); K-Global Heart Dream Awards (2022–2023)
- First award: September 20, 2017; 9 years ago

Television/radio coverage
- Network: hellolive

The K-World Dream Awards (Korean: 케이 월드 드림 어워즈) is an annual music award show in South Korea. The award ceremony was first known the Soribada Best K-Music Awards (소리바다 베스트 케이뮤직 어워즈) in 2017 until discontinued due to the host Soribada delisting possibility in 2021. The award ceremony revived in 2022 with different host and rebranded as the K-Global Heart Dream Awards (케이 글로벌 하트 드림 어워즈) then renamed again in 2024 to the current name.

== History ==
Soribada Best K-Music Awards was hosted by the digital music platform Soribada to celebrate the best and brightest of K-pop releases. The first awards ceremony was held in September 2017 and awarded to the musics released between September 2016 and August 2017. In 2021, the organizing company changed and the award ceremony was revived as the K-Global Heart Dream Awards after the bankruptcy of Soribada. In 2024, the awards ceremony was renamed to the K-World Dream Awards.

== Judging criteria ==
Winners are determined through Soribada's internal data, online and mobile votes from fans across the world, as well as ratings from professional adjudicators and critics.

== List of ceremonies ==
| Edition | Award ceremony | Date | Venue | City | Ref. |
|---|---|---|---|---|---|
| 1st | 2017 Soribada Best K-Music Awards | September 20, 2017 | Jamsil Students' Gymnasium | Seoul, South Korea | |
| 2nd | 2018 Soribada Best K-Music Awards | August 30, 2018 | Olympic Gymnastics Arena | Seoul, South Korea | |
| 3rd | 2019 Soribada Best K-Music Awards | August 22–23, 2019 | Olympic Gymnastics Arena | Seoul, South Korea | |
| 4th | 2020 Soribada Best K-Music Awards | August 13, 2020 | Online Ceremony | | |
| 5th | 2022 K-Global Heart Dream Awards | August 25, 2022 | Jamsil Students' Gymnasium | Seoul, South Korea | |
| 6th | 2023 K-Global Heart Dream Awards | August 10, 2023 | KSPO Dome | Seoul, South Korea | |
| 7th | 2024 K-World Dream Awards | August 22, 2024 | Jamsil Arena | Seoul, South Korea | |
| 8th | 2025 K-World Dream Awards | August 21, 2025 | Jamsil Arena | Seoul, South Korea | |
| 9th | 2026 K-World Dream Awards | August 27, 2026 | KINTEX | Goyang, South Korea | |

== Grand Prize (Daesang) ==
| Ed. | Year | Winner(s) | | | |
|---|---|---|---|---|---|
| 1st | 2017 | Exo (Note: Two were given for the Grand Award & Digital Grand Award categories, respectively.) | | Twice | |
| 2nd | 2018 | BTS | | Twice | |
| 3rd | 2019 | BTS (Note: Four were given for the Artist of the Year, Music of the Year, Stage of the Year, and Live Performance of the Year categories, respectively.) | Twice | Red Velvet | Mamamoo |
| 4th | 2020 | BTS | | | |
| 5th | 2022 | NCT Dream | | | |
| 6th | 2023 | Stray Kids | | | |
| 7th | 2024 | NCT 127 | | Aespa | |
| 8th | 2025 | Stray Kids | | IVE | |

== Main Prize (Bonsang) ==
| Ed. | Year | Winner(s) | | | | | | | | | | | | |
|---|---|---|---|---|---|---|---|---|---|---|---|---|---|---|
| 1st | 2017 | B.A.P | BtoB | Exo | GFriend | Hwang Chi-yeul | Mamamoo | Monsta X | Red Velvet | T-ara | Twice | VIXX | – | |
| 2nd | 2018 | AOA | Bolbbalgan4 | BTS | Mamamoo | Momoland | Monsta X | NCT 127 | NU'EST W | Red Velvet | Twice | Wanna One | – | |
| 3rd | 2019 | AB6IX | BTS | Chungha | Ha Sung-woon | Kim Jae-hwan | Mamamoo | Momoland | Monsta X | NCT 127 | Twice | Red Velvet | Park Ji-hoon | – |
| 4th | 2020 | AB6IX | Astro | BTS | GFriend | Iz*One | Kang Daniel | Lim Young-woong | Mamamoo | NCT Dream | Twice | Oh My Girl | Red Velvet | Victon |
| 5th | 2022 | Heize | Itzy | Ive | Kang Daniel | NCT Dream | Oh My Girl | Psy | The Boyz | Tomorrow X Together | — | — | | |
| 6th | 2023 | Ateez | Enhypen | Itzy | Seventeen | Seulgi | STAYC | Stray Kids | Taeyong | The Boyz | Zerobaseone | — | | |
| 7th | 2024 | Aespa | Bibi | Itzy | Kiss of Life | Lee Mu-jin | NCT 127 | Plave | QWER | Tomorrow X Together | Zerobaseone | — | | |
| 8th | 2025 | Illit | Ive | Le Sserafim | NCT Wish | QWER | Stray Kids | Tomorrow X Together | TripleS | Xdinary Heroes | — | — | | |

== Rookie Award ==
| Ed. | Year | Winner(s) | | |
| Ed. | Year | Group | Band | Trot |
|---|---|---|---|---|
| 1st | 2017 | Wanna One | — | — |
| 1st | 2017 | Pentagon | — | — |
| 2nd | 2018 | The Boyz | IZ | Kangnam |
| 2nd | 2018 | Nature | IZ | Seol Ha-yoon |
| 2nd | 2018 | Stray Kids | IZ | Seol Ha-yoon |
| 3rd | 2019 | Itzy | — | Song Ga-in |
| 3rd | 2019 | Itzy | — | Hong Ja |
| 3rd | 2019 | TXT | — | Kim Soo Chan |
| 3rd | 2019 | TXT | — | Jung Mi Ae |
| 4th | 2020 | Cravity | — | — |
| 4th | 2020 | MCND | — | — |
| 4th | 2020 | TOO | — | — |
| 5th | 2022 | Ive | — | — |
| 5th | 2022 | Kep1er | — | — |
| 5th | 2022 | Le Sserafim | — | — |
| 6th | 2023 | BoyNextDoor | — | — |
| 6th | 2023 | Xikers | — | — |
| 6th | 2023 | Zerobaseone | — | — |
| 7th | 2024 | NCT Wish | — | — |
| 7th | 2024 | TWS | — | — |
| 8th | 2025 | AHOF | Dragon Pony | — |
| 8th | 2025 | Hearts2Hearts | Dragon Pony | — |
| 8th | 2025 | KickFlip | Dragon Pony | — |
| 8th | 2025 | KiiiKiii | Dragon Pony | — |

== Popularity Award ==
| Ed. | Year | Winner(s) | | | |
| Ed. | Year | Male | | Female | |
|---|---|---|---|---|---|
| 1st | 2017 | Exo | | — | |
| 2nd | 2018 | Wanna One | | Mamamoo | |
| 3rd | 2019 | BTS | | Twice | |
| 4th | 2020 | BTS | | Twice | |
| 5th | 2022 | BTS | Kang Daniel | Twice | IU |
| 6th | 2023 | BTS | | Twice | |
| 7th | 2024 | Exo | Kim Jae-joong | Unis | Jeon Yu-jin |
| 8th | 2025 | Stray Kids | Park Ji-hyeon | Unis | Jang Won-young |

== Genre Awards ==
=== Trot Grand Award ===
| Ed. | Year | Winner(s) | |
|---|---|---|---|
| 3rd | 2019 | Jin Sung | Hong Jin-young |

=== Trot Artist Award ===
| Ed. | Year | Winner(s) | |
|---|---|---|---|
| 1st | 2017 | Tae Jin-ah | Hong Jin-young |
| 2nd | 2018 | Tae Jin-ah | Hong Jin-young |
| 3rd | 2019 | Tae Jin-ah | |
| 8th | 2025 | Park Seo-jin | Park Ji-hyeon |

=== Rising Trot Award ===
| Ed. | Year | Winner(s) | |
|---|---|---|---|
| 4th | 2020 | Kim Soo-chan | Second Aunt Kim Da-vi |

=== Hip Hop Artist Award ===
| Ed. | Year | Winner |
|---|---|---|
| 2nd | 2018 | Mino |
| 5th | 2022 | Be'O |
| 6th | 2023 | Zico |

=== R&B Artist Award ===
| Ed. | Year | Winner(s) | |
|---|---|---|---|
| 2nd | 2018 | Crush | |
| 3rd | 2019 | Park Bom | Yang Da-il |

=== Rock Band Award ===
| Ed. | Year | Winner |
|---|---|---|
| 3rd | 2019 | YB |

== Best OST Award ==
| Ed. | Year | Winner | Song | Drama |
|---|---|---|---|---|
| 1st | 2017 | Ailee | "I Will Go to You Like the First Snow" | Goblin |
| 2nd | 2018 | Jeong Se-woon | "It’s You" | What's Wrong with Secretary Kim |
| 4th | 2020 | Gaho | "Start Over" | Itaewon Class |
| 5th | 2022 | Heize | "The Last" | Our Blues |
| 6th | 2023 | Paul Kim | "You Remember" | The Glory |
| 7th | 2024 | Crush | "Love You With All My Heart" | Queen of Tears |
| 8th | 2025 | Huntrix | "Golden" | KPop Demon Hunters |

== Music Video Award ==
| Ed. | Year | Winner(s) | | | |
|---|---|---|---|---|---|
| 1st | 2017 | Zanybros | | | |
| 2nd | 2018 | Zanybros | | | |
| 5th | 2022 | DreamCatcher | Golden Child | SF9 | Le Sserafim |
| 6th | 2023 | Fromis 9 | | The Boyz | |
| 7th | 2024 | Aespa | | Young Posse | |
| 8th | 2025 | Illit | TripleS | Young Posse | |

== Music Producer Awards ==
=== Producer Award ===
| Ed. | Year | Winner |
|---|---|---|
| 1st | Stray kids | |
| 2nd | 2018 | bangchan |
| 3rd | 2019 | Rhymer |
| 4th | 2020 | Kim Do-hoon |
| 5th | 2022 | Psy |
| 6th | 2023 | Yoon Young-ro |
| 7th | 2024 | Shinsadong Tiger |
| 8th | 2025 | Seo Hyun-joo |

=== Songwriter Award ===
| Ed. | Year | Winner(s) | |
|---|---|---|---|
| 4th | 2020 | Lee Han-gil | Turns Out Comatose |
| 5th | 2022 | Turns Out Comatose | |

=== Best Hip Hop Maker Award ===
| Ed. | Year | Winner(s) | |
|---|---|---|---|
| 3rd | 2019 | Groovy Room | dress |

== Special Hallyu Awards ==
=== Artist of the Year Award (Note: Formerly a grand award category, it has been demoted off its grand award category status to a grand award final nominee consolation award category since 2020.) ===
| Ed. | Year | Winner |
|---|---|---|
| 4th | 2020 | Twice |

=== Music of the Year Award ===
| Ed. | Year | Winner |
|---|---|---|
| 4th | 2020 | Red Velvet |

=== Stage of the Year Award ===
| Ed. | Year | Winner |
|---|---|---|
| 4th | 2020 | Kang Daniel |

=== Artist Award ===
| Ed. | Year | Winner(s) | |
|---|---|---|---|
| 1st | 2017 | BTS | |
| 2nd | 2018 | Monsta X | Red Velvet |
| 3rd | 2019 | WJSN | Lovelyz |
| 4th | 2020 | TXT | Itzy |

=== Performance Award ===
| Ed. | Year | Winner(s) | |
|---|---|---|---|
| 1st | 2017 | NCT 127 | Gugudan |
| 2nd | 2018 | Samuel | DIA |
| 3rd | 2019 | Ateez | Loona |
| 4th | 2020 | The Boyz | (G)I-dle |

=== Rising Hot Star Award ===
| Ed. | Year | Winner(s) | | |
|---|---|---|---|---|
| 1st | 2017 | WJSN | Wanna One | — |
| 2nd | 2018 | Hyeongseop X Euiwoong | YDPP | — |
| 3rd | 2019 | N.Flying | Stray Kids | The Boyz |
| 4th | 2020 | Nature | Loona | GWSN |
| 6th | 2022 | AleXa | Blitzers | The New Six |

=== Icon Award ===
| Ed. | Year | Winner(s) | |
|---|---|---|---|
| 1st | 2017 | Red Velvet | |
| 2nd | 2018 | NU'EST W | |
| 3rd | 2019 | Oh My Girl | Park Ji-hoon |
| 4th | 2020 | Oneus | WJSN |

=== Voice Award ===
| Ed. | Year | Winner(s) | | |
|---|---|---|---|---|
| 1st | 2017 | Han Dong-geun | | |
| 2nd | 2018 | Wheesung | GB9 (Social) | Seo J (Social) |
| 3rd | 2019 | Jeong Se-woon | Lee Chang-min | Lee Woo (Social) |
| 4th | 2020 | Kim Jae-hwan | Kim Woo-seok | Ha Sung-woon |

=== Music Star Award ===
| Ed. | Year | Winner(s) | |
|---|---|---|---|
| 1st | 2017 | Sonamoo | KNK |
| 2nd | 2018 | Chungha | UNB |
| 3rd | 2019 | CLC | Nature |

=== Global Entertainer Award ===
| Ed. | Year | Winner(s) | |
|---|---|---|---|
| 2nd | 2018 | 7Senses | |
| 3rd | 2019 | Zero 9 | SNH48 |

=== Social Artist Award ===
| Ed. | Year | Winner(s) | |
|---|---|---|---|
| 2nd | 2018 | BTS | |
| 3rd | 2019 | Hwasa | NCT 127 |

=== Global Hot Trend Award ===
| Ed. | Year | Winner(s) | |
|---|---|---|---|
| 3rd | 2019 | ASTRO | |
| 4th | 2020 | Stray Kids | Iz*One |

=== Next Artist Award ===
| Ed. | Year | Winner(s) | | |
|---|---|---|---|---|
| 3rd | 2019 | Oneus | Newkidd | A.C.E |
| 4th | 2020 | DKB | AleXa | — |

== Other Awards ==
| Edition | Year | Award | Winner(s) | |
|---|---|---|---|---|
| 1st | 2017 | Photogenic Award | DIA | |
| 1st | 2017 | Global Career Achievement Award | Eru | |
| 2nd | 2018 | Trend Queen Award | Seo In-young | |
| 2nd | 2018 | People's Choice Award | Exo | |
| 3rd | 2019 | New Wave Award | Monsta X | (G)I-dle |
| 3rd | 2019 | Art-tainer Award | Nam Woo-hyun | Weki Meki |
| 4th | 2020 | New K-Wave Real Fan Award | Kang Daniel | |
| 4th | 2020 | Global Artist Award | Astro | |
| 9th | 2025 | | | |
| 9th | 2025 | Global Artist Award | Tomorrow X Together | |

== Most Wins ==
The following artists received five or more awards:

| Rank | Artist(s) | Awards |
|---|---|---|
| 1 | Twice | 10 |
| 1 | BTS | 10 |
| 1 | Stray Kids | 10 |
| 4 | Red Velvet | 8 |
| 5 | Mamamoo | 6 |
| 5 | Ive | 6 |
| 5 | Tomorrow X Together | 6 |
| 8 | Monsta X | 5 |
