= Remain (KNK EP) =

EP by KNK
- Released: November 17, 2016
- Length: 18:16
- Language: Korean
- Label: YNB; CJ E&M (Distribution)

KNK chronology
Awake (2016)	Remain (2016)	Gravity, Completed (2017)

Singles from Awake
- 1. "U" Released: November 17, 2016

Remain is the second extended play (EP) by South Korean boy group KNK. It contains six tracks, including the lead single, "U".

== Background and release ==
On November 7, 2016, YNB Entertainment announced KNK's comeback by sharing the cover image of their second EP titled Remain through their official SNS channels. A group and "White version" individual image teasers were unveiled on the next two days. The track list was also released on November 10, revealing that Kim Tae-joo once again worked with KNK as the producer, while tracks "Goodbye" and "Tonight" were composed and written by members Youjin and Heejun respectively.

On November 13, KNK released an album preview which gave sneak peeks of each song. A new set of individual image teasers called "Black version" was released the next day. On November 15, the music video teaser for the lead single, "U", was released, however it was announced the following day that the agency and the members decided to dispose the music video due to quality issues. A representative stated that there were no plans to film it again. The album was released on November 17, 2016. It was also released as a digital download on various music portals.

== Promotion ==
On November 17, 2016, KNK held their live comeback show through Naver V Live, where they performed TVXQ's "Love in the Ice", as well as their new songs "I Know" and "U". The group then made their music program comeback stages on Music Bank, Show! Music Core and Inkigayo.

== Track listing ==
No.	Title	Lyrics	Music	Arrangement	Length
1.	"Stay"	Kim Tae-joo	Kim Tae-joo	Kim Tae-joo	1:39
2.	"U"	Kim Tae-joo	Kim Tae-joo	Kim Tae-joo	3:36
3.	"Beauty" (아름다워)	Kim Tae-joo	Kim Tae-joo	Kim Tae-joo	3:26
4.	"I Know" (웃어줄래)	Kim Tae-joo	Kim Tae-joo	Kim Tae-joo	3:21
5.	"Goodbye" (괜찮은가봐)	Kim You-jin	Kim You-jin; Kim Tae-joo	Kim Tae-joo	3:00
6.	"Tonight"	Oh Hee-jun	Oh Hee-jun; Kim Tae-joo	Kim Tae-joo	3:14
Total length:					18:16

== Release history ==
Region	Date	Format	Distributor
Various	November 17, 2016	digital download	YNB Entertainment, CJ E&M Music
South Korea	November 17, 2016	CD	YNB Entertainment, CJ E&M Music
