= Choi Sung-bong =

South Korean singer (1990–2023)

Sungbong Choi 최성봉
- Born: 18 February 1990; Seoul, South Korea
- Died: 20 June 2023 (aged 33) Seoul, South Korea
- Genres: Vocal, popera, classical crossover
- Occupations: Artist, author
- Labels: Sony Music Entertainment, Bongbong Company

- Choi Sung-bong
- Hangul: 최성봉
- RR: Choe Seongbong
- MR: Ch'oe Sŏngbong

Sungbong Choi (최성봉; 18 February 1990 – 20 June 2023) was a South Korean singer. After passing qualification examinations for elementary school and middle school, he graduated from the Dae-Jeon Art High School, and made his debut on the 2011 season of Korea's Got Talent. He was the first runner-up of the talent show.

== Early life ==
Sungbong Choi was born in Seoul and was abandoned at an orphanage when he was three. He ran away from the orphanage to escape physical abuse, took a bus to Daejeon, and started living in the red-light districts. He approached Jeong-So Park for music lessons; Park agreed to teach him for free and helped get him support from the church and ChildFund Korea.

=== Education ===
After passing elementary school and middle school through qualification examinations, Choi graduated from Dae-Jeon Art High School, and went on to study at the Department of Cultural Art Management at Kyung-Hee Cyber University.

During his troubled youth, Choi claimed he hid at a night school at age 14 to escape area gang members. He learned how to read and write and applied for qualification examinations to pass elementary and middle school and enter high school. With hopes of learning music and spending his school years with friends, he entered Dae-Jeon Art High School. To earn school tuition fee and private lesson fees, he worked at a delivery service, but suffered an injury while working. Choi thought about dropping out of high school, and his music teacher testified that he was often absent because of the underprivileged surroundings. He gained admission to Hanyang University, but due to financial difficulties, was unable to pursue undergraduate education. Instead, he spent his days working as a day laborer.

== Career ==
=== Korea's Got Talent ===
On 6 June 2011, Choi's performance of Ennio Morricone's "Nella Fantasia" on Korea's Got Talent was received positively. He introduced himself as a manual laborer who had made a living selling gum and energy drinks for ten years. All three judges, Kolleen Park, Jang Jin and Song Yun-ah, were impressed enough with his vocal talent that Choi was advanced to the finals of the competition, finishing second by only 280 votes.

=== YouTube ===
Choi's performance clip was posted to YouTube and received praise from pop stars Justin Bieber, BoA, Jung-Hwa Um, several hundred thousand fans on Facebook, as well as political figures such as South Korea's former president Lee Myung-bak.. One version with English subtitles had triggered international press interest, with claims that Choi was "the next Susan Boyle". As of September 2020 the video has 175,078,474 views.

=== Controversy ===
On 4 June 2011, after his first appearance on the show, some people accused him of concealing the fact that he had graduated from art high school although he was rarely able to attend classes due to his financial situation and was said to have received his diploma out of pity.

The KGT production team explained that "It was cut from the film during editing. He stated that he'd graduated from art high school at the second local try-out, and the judges, crews and hundreds of audience members heard that." KGT later broadcast the re-edited version including the statement.

=== Entertainment ===
After his appearance on KGT, other major entertainment companies persuaded Choi to sign contracts with them. Ultimately, he signed with Sony Music Korea Inc. but cancelled the contract in December 2011. Until his death, he was signed with Bongbong Company.

=== Health issues ===
Choi claimed in January 2021 that he was suffering from cancer and raising funds to support his latest album. On 29 October 2021, Choi admitted to faking his cancer illness. In an apology released to Korean media, Choi stated, "I am not currently suffering from cancer and I admit that I am not suffering from colon, prostate, thyroid, lungs, brain, and heart cancer."

=== Death ===
Choi died by suicide on 20 June 2023, after having left a suicide note on his online channel, which has since been taken down. He was 33.

== Music ==
=== Artistry – Crossover tenor ===
CNN commented that "His powerful baritone voice sounds as if it belongs to a man twice his age and build."

=== Performances ===
- Invitation performance by South Korean president, Charity performances and speeches
- Invitation performance by chairman of Cisco [San Diego, United States, April 2012]
- You Fest Main Final Concert (with Paul Potts) [Madrid, Spain, September 2012]
- Singing the Korean National Anthem at the inaugural ceremony of London Olympics [Seoul, July–August 2012]
- Conducting Chorus of Global Multicultural Festival [Seoul, May 2013]
- Halftime performance at Suwon International Olympics "Peace cup" [Suwon, July 2012]
- Teenager's Healing Concert by Ministry of Environment [Seoul, July 2012]
- Singing the South Korean national anthem at the National Assembly on Constitution Day (with the Millennium Symphony) [Seoul, July 2012]
- Andy – Live In Concert at the Greek Theatre [Los Angeles, United States, August 2012]
- Accompanied Performance with Seoul Philharmonic

=== Album ===
- Featuring Korea's Got Talent // Nella Fantasia, Cinema Paradiso [Sony Music] [2011]
- Featuring Popera Vocalist Park Jung So Nella Fantasia // Nella Fantasia [2012]
- Featuring Popera Vocalist Park Jung So Because He Lives // Amazing Grace [2012]

== Essay ==
Choi wrote a book entitled Singing is My Life – Memoir of My Journey from Homelessness to Fame (published by Munhak Dongne, South Korea) about his life and career, which became a best seller.

== Broadcasting and interviews ==
=== Outline ===
Choi appeared on music shows, documentary films, and talk shows both in South Korea and abroad. He appeared with Justin Bieber on the Spanish TV program El Hormiguero. CNN and ABC headlined the interview with him. Choi said that he wants to continue to overcome his experiences of the past 22 years. "It is a blessing that I can live my life without starving, being abused and freezing. I'll keep taking on challenges and trying my best."

=== Television shows and interviews ===
Korea's Got Talent season 1 [tvN, June 2011]

- Live Talk Show Taxi [tvN, September 2011]
- Back Ji-yeo's People inside [tvN, September 2011]
- Documentary Film Rebel of 3 color talent [tvN, September 2011]
- Story on Kind Ms. Mi-sun [tvN, November 2011]
- Opera star 2012 [tvN, February 2012]
- Morning Garden [KBS1, May 2012]
- El Hormiguero [Antena3 (Spain), May 2012]
- KBS Speech 100 °C [KBS1, June 2012]
- MBN News square [MBN, February 2013]

=== Magazine article features ===
- Lady Kyunghyang [South Korea, 2011, 2013]
- Korean Daily 100 °C [South Korea, 2012]
- Woman Sense [South Korea, 2013]
- Woman's life [South Korea, 2013]

=== Advertisements ===
- Public Advertisement for Election Committee [2012]
- Radio Campaign "Wait a Minute" [MBC]
- The Korea Highway Corporation "Belt Song"

== Philanthropy ==
=== Honorary ambassador ===
Choi was an honorary ambassador of ChildFund Korea, the organization which helped him to improve his own life. He said that he won't just tell the children to "have hope and dream", but he wants to help them practically by giving them a chance of a better life. He was also an honorary ambassador of the Chang Dong Social Welfare Center.

=== Talent donation ===
Choi had said, "People who suffer have feelings that can't be explained by words. I hope my performances provide some consolation and an uplifting feeling to those in need." He performed for non privileged people, including single mothers, youths in juvenile custody, and hospice centers.

== Awards ==
- Semifinal Winner of Korea's Got Talent Season 1
- 9th Candle Award by Pop Culture Critic of College Union
- New Artist by Foreign Correspondents Club

== See also ==
- List of YouTube personalities
- List of South Korean television series
- List of South Korean musicians
- Television in South Korea
