= Blue (Zerobaseone song) =

- Japanese version cover

Single by Zerobaseone

from the EP Blue Paradise
- Language: Korean
- Released: February 24, 2025
- Genre: Dance-pop
- Length: 3:02
- Label: WakeOne
- Composers: Kenzie; Andrew Choi; No2zcat; Jsong
- Lyricist: Kenzie
- Producers: Kenzie; No2zcat

Zerobaseone singles chronology
"Doctor! Doctor!" (2025)	"Blue" (2025)	"Slam Dunk" (2025)

Music video
- "Blue" on YouTube

"Blue" is a song recorded by South Korean boy band Zerobaseone. It was released on February 24, 2025, by WakeOne, serving as the title track from Blue Paradise, the band's fifth Korean-language EP.

== Background and release ==
On February 3, 2025, WakeOne announced that Zerobaseone's fifth Korean-language EP titled Blue Paradise will be released on February 24. After five days, WakeOne posted the poster of Zerobaseone's title track "Blue" on the group's social media accounts. On February 17, a snippet of the track was released on Zerobaseone official TikTok account and runs for 24 seconds and presumably highlights the hook of the single. The teasers of the single were released on February 19 and 22, respectively.

The Japanese version of "Blue" was released digitally on March 21, 2025.

== Composition ==
"Blue" has a runtime of three minute and two seconds. The song was written, co-composed, and co-arranged by Kenzie along with Andrew Choi, No2zcat and Jsong. Musically, the single features an alternative dance-pop genre, and the contrast between the cool synth sound and emotional vocals gives a mysterious refreshing feeling. Lyrically, it capitalizes on the ambivalent meaning of the word, singing about a "fated love that's sad, but that's why it's so beautiful". The song is composed in the key of F major with a tempo of 124 beats per minute.

== Music video ==
The music video for "Blue" was released in conjunction with their fifth Korean-language EP. It showcases how Zerobaseone's members embarks on a journey to find 'Blue Paradise' where the video concludes that the future is full of unpredictable mysteries, but that these experiences will make us grow as people.

== Credits and personnel ==
Credits adapted from the EP's liner notes.

Studio

- WakeOne Studio – recording
- Vibe Music Studio 606 – recording
- Klang Studio – mixing, Dolby Atmos mixing, Dolby Atmos mastering
- Sterling Sound – mastering

Personnel

- Zerobaseone – vocals
- Kenzie – producer, lyrics, composition, arrangement, vocal arrangement
- Andrew Choi – composition, background vocals
- No2zcat – producer, composition, arrangement, instruments
- Jsong – composition, vocal arrangement
- Hong Soo-yeon – recording
- Jeong Mo-yeon – recording
- Kim Joon-hyung – recording assistant
- Kang Dong-ho – digital editing
- Hong Jang-mi – engineered for mix
- Koo Jong-pil – mixing, Dolby Atmos mixing, Dolby Atmos mastering
- P.O.D. – assistant Dolby Atmos mixing, assistant Dolby Atmos mastering
- Chris Gehringer – mastering

== Accolades ==
Music program awards
Program	Date	Ref.
The Show	March 4, 2025	
Show Champion	March 5, 2025	
Music Bank	March 7, 2025	

== Charts ==
Chart performance for "Blue"
Chart (2025)	Peak position
Japan (Japan Hot 100)	88
Japan Streaming (Oricon)	43
South Korea (Circle)	58

== Release history ==
Release history for "Blue"
Region	Date	Format	Version	Label
Various	February 24, 2025	Digital download; streaming	Original	WakeOne
Various	March 21, 2025	Digital download; streaming	Japanese	WakeOne; Lapone; Ariola Japan
