= Blue Paradise =

- Digital cover

EP by Zerobaseone
- Released: February 24, 2025
- Genre: K-pop
- Length: 16:55
- Language: Korean
- Labels: WakeOne; Genie Music; Stone Music

Zerobaseone chronology
Prezent (2025)	Blue Paradise (2025)	Never Say Never (2025)

Singles from Blue Paradise
- 1. "Doctor! Doctor!" Released: January 20, 2025; 2. "Blue" Released: February 24, 2025

Blue Paradise is the fifth Korean-language extended play and sixth overall by South Korean boy band Zerobaseone. It was released on February 24, 2025, by WakeOne. The EP is supported by the singles "Doctor! Doctor!", which was released a month prior, and "Blue", which was released along with the rest of the EP. The release is presented as the second part of the band's "Paradise" series, following Cinema Paradise (2024).

== Background and release ==
In August 2024, Zerobaseone released their fourth EP, Cinema Paradise, supported by its lead single, "Good So Bad". With the release, the band became the first K-pop group to sell one million copies on the first day of release for four consecutive albums. The band also embarked on its first tour, Timeless World, playing to over 140,000 spectators in East and Southeast Asia.

The band began 2025 with the release of Prezent, their first Japanese-language EP. On January 9, WakeOne announced that the Zerobaseone would be releasing "Doctor! Doctor!", the first single from their new fifth Korean-language EP, on the 20th. At the same time, the agency confirmed that EP would be released in February, though no specific date was revealed until a week later when the release was confirmed for February 24.

The EP's title, Blue Paradise, was announced at midnight on February 3. At the same time, the band revealed a teaser trailer entitled "Quest: Find Blue" on their social media. The title of the EP's second single, "Blue", was revealed on February 7, along with a teaser poster showing a blue fountain against a night sky.

== Composition ==
Blue Paradise acts as the second part of the band's two-part "Paradise" series, following 2024's Cinema Paradise. The EP's first single, "Doctor! Doctor!", is described as a contemporary R&B ballad, with lyrics that center around the band pleading for a doctor to heal them of their lovesickness. While the title track, "Blue", features an alternative dance-pop genre and it capitalizes on the ambivalent meaning of the word, singing about a "fated love that's sad, but that's why it's so beautiful".

The EP contains six tracks, including three tracks that are each performed by separate units of the band: "Out of Love", performed by Kim Ji-woong, Zhang Hao, and Kim Gyu-vin, "Step Back", performed by Ricky, Park Gun-wook, and Han Yu-jin, and "Cruel", performed by Sung Han-bin, Seok Matthew, and Kim Tae-rae. The songs are the first "unit" songs to be released by the band.

== Promotion ==
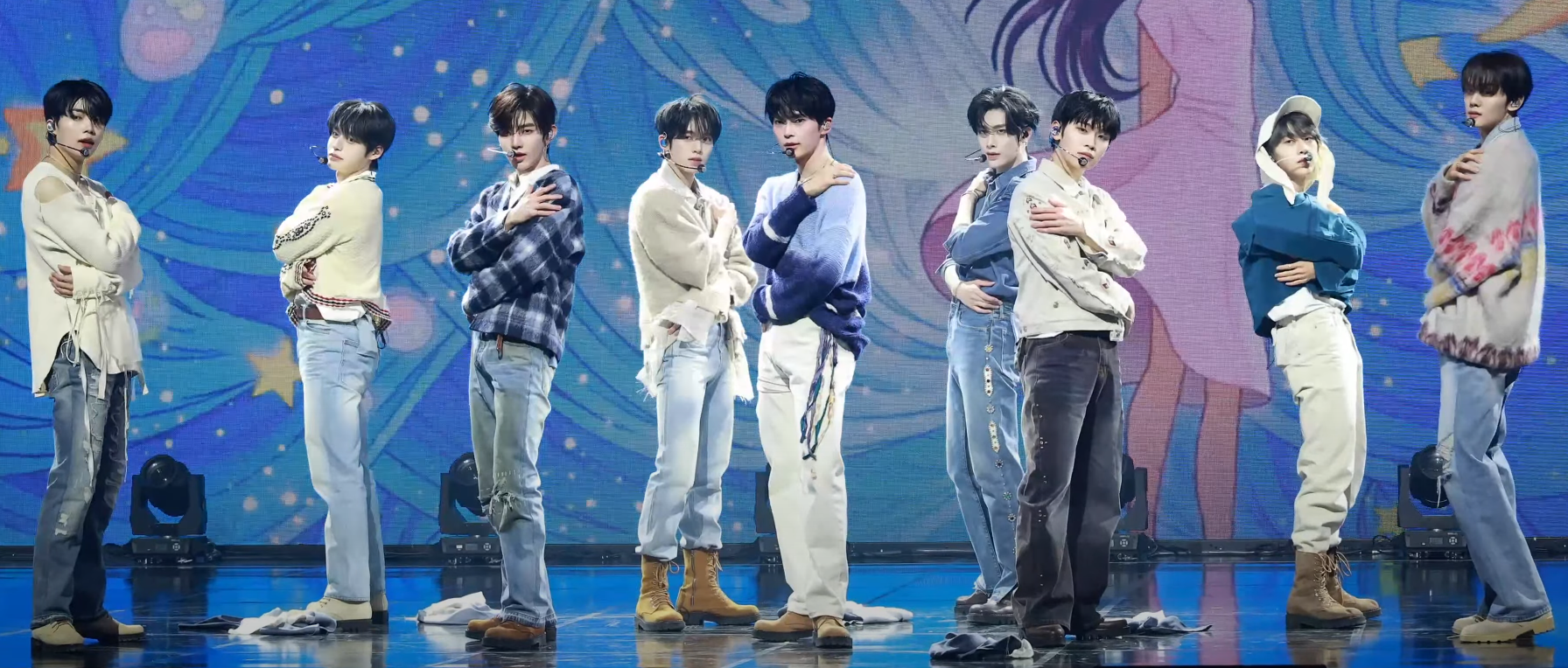
Zerobaseone performing "Blue" at the EP's media showcase on February 24, 2025

Zerobaseone promoted the EP with performance of "Doctor! Doctor!" on Mnet's M Countdown on January 23. The stage for the performance was dressed to resemble a hospital, and the band used hand gestures spelling out each letter of "love". The band's agency also announced the "'Doctor! Doctor!' 10 Million Streaming Challenge", promising to donate ₩100 million (US$74,611) to an unnamed charity in the name of their fans if the song receives 10 million streams on South Korean music service Melon. On March 5, the charity was revealed to be the Seoul National University Children's Hospital Sponsorship Association.

On the day of the EP's release, the band held a media showcase at Blue Square in Yeonsan-gu, Seoul where they performed tracks from Blue Paradise.

Blue Paradise was further promoted with a series of pop-up stores. The first store ran from February 21 through March 6, comprising the entire fifth floor of the Hyundai Department Store in Yeoui-dong, Seoul. The store was decorated in the theme of the album, with a large fountain, mobile missions, and a game zone. The band also held an album signing at the store. A second pop-up store in Japan ran from March 7 to 25 at the Line Friends Square Store in Shibuya, Tokyo. The Japanese store featured a media zone with four large screens displaying the band's visual content, photo booths, and merchandise featuring the band's stuffed mascots, "Zeroni".

== Commercial performance ==
On the day of the EP's release, Blue Paradise sold over 1.01 million copies in South Korea. The EP debuted at number-one on the Circle Album Chart with total first week sales of 1,236,983 copies. Blue Paradise became the band's fifth consecutive release to sell over one million copies in the first week in South Korea.

In Japan, the EP debuted at number-one on the Oricon Albums Chart for the chart dated March 10, 2025, with sales of 57,272.

== Track listing ==
Blue Paradise track listing
No.	Title	Lyrics	Music	Arrangement	Length
1.	"Blue"	Kenzie	Kenzie; Andrew Choi; No2zcat; Jsong	No2zcat; Kenzie	3:02
2.	"Devil Game"	Bang Hye-hyun	Jayjay; Park Woo-jeong; Young Chance; Junny	Jayjay; Park	2:58
3.	"Doctor! Doctor!"	Bang; Aaron Berton; Matt Crawford	Crawford; Berton; Kella Armitage; Noémie Legrand	Theo and the Climb	2:32
4.	"Out of Love" (performed by Kim Ji-woong, Zhang Hao, and Kim Gyu-vin)	Ogi (Galactika); Ahn Mi-sun; Seon (XYXX); 01 (153/Joombas); Lee Seu-ran	Versachoi; Nickko Young; Ninos Hanna; William Segerdahl	Versachoi; Nickko Young	2:35
5.	"Step Back" (performed by Ricky, Park Gun-wook, and Han Yu-jin)	Lee; Ryan S. Jhun; Davide Russo; Okhan Uenver	Jhun; Russo; Uenver	Jhun; Russo	2:51
6.	"Cruel" (performed by Sung Han-bin, Seok Matthew, and Kim Tae-rae)	Moon Ji-young; Hyung Geun; Cha Ri (153/Joombas); Baek Se-im; Jiwon (153/Joombas)	El Capitxn; Zenur; Celotron; Taneisha Jackson; Charlotte Wilson; Chiller (Vendors); Owl (Vendors); Bodega Cat (Vendors)	El Capitxn; Zenur	2:57
Total length:					16:55

== Charts ==
=== Weekly charts ===
Weekly chart performance
Chart (2025)	Peak position
Croatian International Albums (HDU)	11
Japanese Albums (Oricon)	1
Japanese Combined Albums (Oricon)	1
Japanese Hot Albums (Billboard Japan)	38
South Korean Albums (Circle)	1
US Billboard 200	28
US Independent Albums (Billboard)	5
US World Albums (Billboard)	1

=== Monthly charts ===
Monthly chart performance
Chart (2025)	Position
Japanese Albums (Oricon)	8
South Korean Albums (Circle)	2

=== Year-end charts ===
Year-end chart performance
Chart (2025)	Position
Japanese Albums (Oricon)	54
South Korean Albums (Circle)	11

== Certifications ==
Certifications
Region	Certification	Certified units/sales
South Korea (KMCA)	Million	1,000,000^{^}
^{^} Shipments figures based on certification alone.

== Release history ==
Release history
Region	Date	Format	Label
Various	February 24, 2025	Digital download; streaming	WakeOne
South Korea	February 24, 2025	CD	WakeOne
United States	April 4, 2025	CD	WakeOne
