= Awake (KNK EP) =

EP by KNK
- Released: June 2, 2016
- Length: 23:03
- Language: Korean
- Labels: YNB Entertainment; CJ E&M (Distribution)

KNK chronology
Awake (2016)	Remain (2016)

Singles from Awake
- 1. "I Remember" Released: May 16, 2016; 2. "Back Again" Released: June 2, 2016

Music video
- "Back Again" on YouTube

Awake is the first extended play (EP) by South Korean boy group KNK. It contains six songs and two instrumental tracks, including the lead single, "Back Again". All tracks from the EP was personally written, composed and arranged by Kim Tae-joo who also produced hit songs like Beast's "Good Luck", "12:30" and more.

== Background and release ==
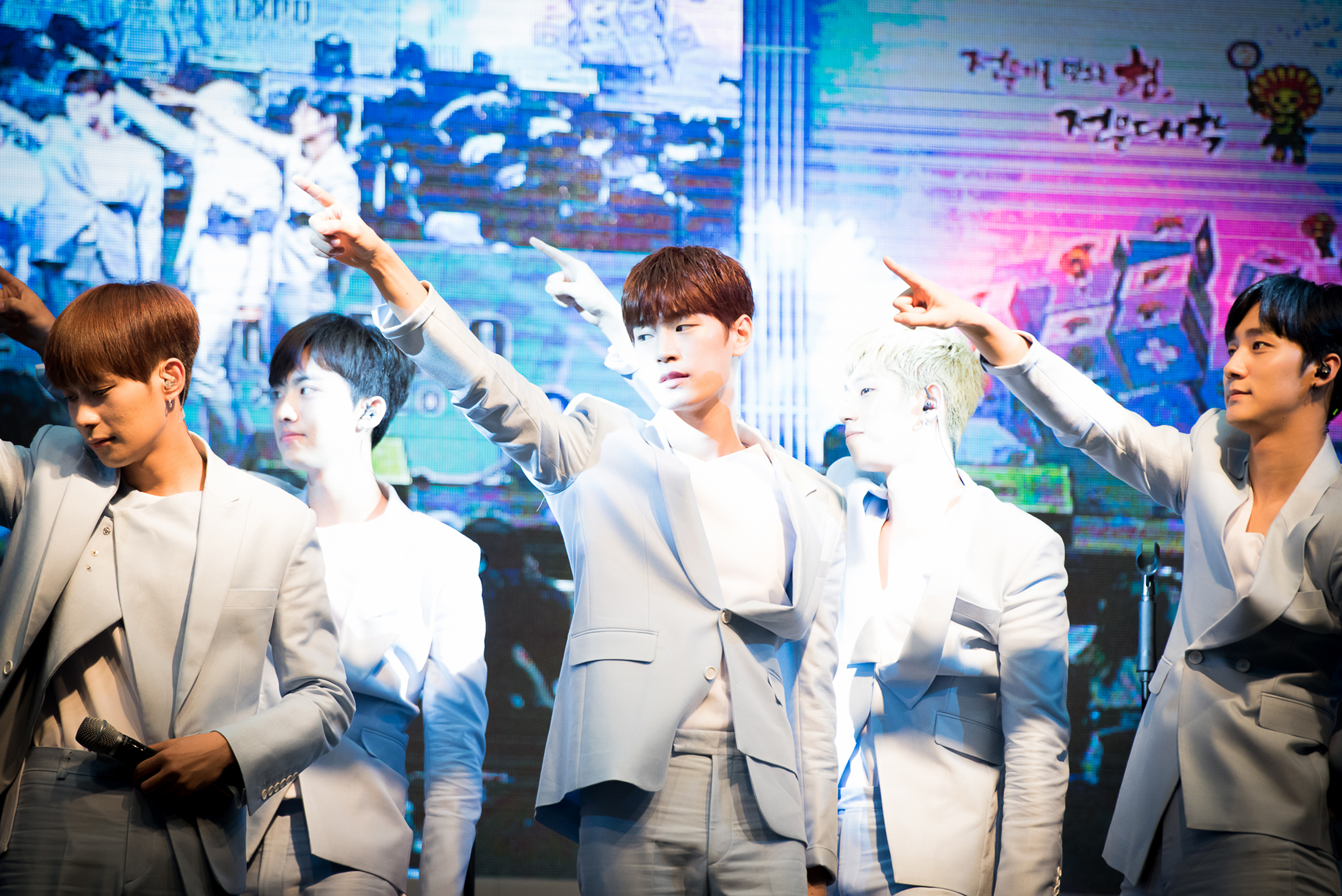
KNK performing "I Remember" in July 2016

On May 16, 2016, KNK released their first digital single "I Remember", a medium tempo R&B track.

A week later, YNB Entertainment announced the comeback of the group with their first EP titled Awake through KNK's official SNS. A group image teaser and individual photos for the EP was unveiled on May 24 and 25 respectively. On May 27, the first music video teaser for the title track "Back Again" was released, followed by the release of album preview the next day. The second and last music video teaser for the "Back Again" was released on the 1st of June. The album was officially released on the next day. It was also released as a digital download on various music portals.

== Promotion ==
On June 3, 2016, KNK made their comeback stage on Music Bank, where they performed the two singles from the EP. It was then followed by performances of "Back Again" on Show! Music Core on the 4th, Inkigayo on the 5th and M Countdown on the 9th.

On June 8, KNK performed their comeback stage on MBC Music's Show Champion with "Back Again" and "Gone". The choreography for "Gone" was personally arranged by member Jihun.

== Commercial performance ==
Awake entered the Gaon Album Chart at number 12 for the 23rd week of 2016, until it reached its peak at number 7 for the 31st week.

== Track listing ==
All tracks are written by Kim Tae-joo.

No.	Title	Length
1.	"Gone"	1:45
2.	"Back Again"	3:28
3.	"I Remember" (요즘 넌 어때)	3:28
4.	"I'll Try" (노력해볼게)	3:29
5.	"Day N Night"	3:29
6.	"Propose" (고백)	3:28
7.	"Back Again (Inst.)"	3:28
8.	"I Remember (Inst.)" (요즘 넌 어때 (Inst.))	3:28
Total length:		26:03

== Release history ==
Region	Date	Format	Distributor
South Korea, Worldwide	June 2, 2016	digital download	YNB Entertainment, CJ E&M Music
South Korea	June 2, 2016	CD	YNB Entertainment, CJ E&M Music
