= Doctor! Doctor! (Zerobaseone song) =

Single by Zerobaseone

from the EP Blue Paradise
- Language: Korean
- Released: January 20, 2025
- Recorded: 2024
- Genre: R&B
- Length: 2:32
- Label: WakeOne
- Composers: Aaron Theodore Berton; Matthew Robert Crawford; Kella Armitage; Noémie Legrand
- Lyricists: Bang Hye-hyun; Berton; Crawford
- Producers: Theo & The Climb

Zerobaseone singles chronology
"Now or Never" (2025)	"Doctor! Doctor!" (2025)	"Blue" (2025)

Music video
- "Doctor! Doctor!" on YouTube

"Doctor! Doctor!" is a song recorded by South Korean boy band Zerobaseone. It was released on January 20, 2025, by WakeOne, serving as the first single from Blue Paradise, the band's fifth Korean-language EP. An R&B ballad, the song's lyrics center around the band pleading for a doctor to heal them of their lovesickness.

== Background and release ==
The release of "Doctor! Doctor!" was announced by WakeOne on January 9, 2025. In the announcement, the agency confirmed that the song would act as the first single from Zerobaseone's fifth Korean-language EP, and indicating the EP would be released some time in February. The song's release came 9 days before the release of the band's debut Japanese EP, Prezent, and their agency indicated that the group would be promoting both simultaneously.

The following week, promotional concept photos in a bright Valentine's Day theme were released, showing the band's members in a pink color palate and posing with Love Hearts candies. The song's cover art, illustrated by Japanese horror manga artist Junji Ito, was revealed the next day. Standing in contrast to the bright concept photos previously released, the artwork follows a darker concept, showing a man laying in bed, clutching his heart while a doctor watches. The artwork is Ito's first collaboration with a K-pop artist.

== Composition ==
"Doctor! Doctor!"
A 15-second audio sample of "Doctor! Doctor", a contemporary R&B song with "easy-listening" melody.

On the song's announcement, the band's agency described "Doctor! Doctor!" as a contemporary R&B ballad with an "addictive, easy-listening melody". The song's lyrics, which revolve around the band begging a doctor to heal them of their lovesickness and liken the feeling of first love to a hot fever, were written by Bang Hye-hyun of songwriting collective Jam Factory, Aaron Theodore Berton, and Matthew Robert Crawford. Berton and Crawford also participated in the song's composition, along with Kella Armitage and Noémie Legrand. Arrangement was completed by Berton and Crawford, credited as a production duo Theo & The Climb.

== Music video ==
The music video for "Doctor! Doctor!" was first previewed in a teaser clip uploaded to the band's YouTube channel on January 19. The music video features an appearance by actor Jung Kyung-ho, in the role of a doctor. In the music video, which was released concurrently with the song on January 20, each member of the band is shown with different love-related ailments that they ask the doctor to fix.

== Promotion ==
On the day of the song's release, the band's agency announced the "'Doctor! Doctor!' 10 Million Streaming Challenge", promising to donate ₩100 million (US$87,416) to an unnamed charity in the name of their fans if the song receives 10 million streams on South Korean music service Melon. The donation was said to be part of a campaign to allow K-pop fans to "easily participate in social activities", and "give the gift of a warm winter to those in need". On March 5, it was revealed that Seoul National University Children's Hospital Sponsorship Association received the said donation.

Zerobaseone performed "Doctor! Doctor!" for the first time on Mnet's M Countdown on January 23. The stage for the performance was dressed to resemble a hospital, and the band used hand gestures spelling out each letter of "love".

== Charts ==
=== Weekly charts ===
Weekly chart performance for "Doctor! Doctor!"
Chart (2025)	Peak position
Japan Hot Shot Songs (Billboard Japan)	7
South Korea (Circle)	107

=== Monthly charts ===
Monthly chart performance for "Doctor! Doctor!"
Chart (2025)	Position
South Korea (Circle)	200

== Release history ==
Release history for "Doctor! Doctor!"
Region	Date	Format	Label
Various	January 20, 2025	Digital download; streaming	WakeOne
