= 2023 K-Global Heart Dream Awards =

2023 edition of award ceremony

- Date: August 10, 2023
- Venue: KSPO Dome, Seoul
- Country: South Korea
- Presented by: TV Daily; Choeaedol
- Hosted by: Jang Do-yeon; Jun Hyun-moo
- Preshow hosts: Kim Seon-geun; Hwang In-hye
- Most awards: Stray Kids (3)
- Website: awards.myloveidol.com/en

Television/radio coverage
- Network: lakus.live; Space Shower TV

The 2023 K-Global Heart Dream Awards was an award ceremony held at KSPO Dome in Seoul on August 10, 2023. The red carpet ceremony was hosted by announcer Kim Seon-geun and actress Hwang In-hye. Meanwhile, the award ceremony was hosted by Jun Hyun-moo and Jang Do-yeon.

It was broadcast live on Space Shower TV in Japan and lakus.live for worldwide.

== Criteria ==
Category	Criteria	Notes
Popularity Awards	100% Online voting results	Voting platform : Choeaedol and Choeaedol Celeb Application; Voting period : July 5 – August 6, 2023; Sub Category : Solo Artist; Boy Group; Girl Group; 4th Gen. (M); 4th Gen. (F)
Fandom Charity Awards	100% Choeaedol Data	Data : Donation Rank in Choeaedol and Choeaedol Celeb Application together; Data period : Donation history from July 31, 2022 – July 31, 2023

== Winner and nominees ==
The winner of popularity awards was confirmed after the voting period ended and was announced on August 8, 2023. The winner was listed in bold.

Bonsang
**Enhypen**; **Zerobaseone**; **Seulgi**; **The Boyz**; **Seventeen**; **STAYC**; **Taeyong**; **Ateez**; **Stray Kids**; **Itzy**
Best Artist	Best Song
**Stray Kids**	**(G)I-dle**; **Le Sserafim**; **Ive**; **aespa**; **NewJeans**
Best Producer	Best World Tour
**Yoon Young-ro** **(IST Entertainment)**	**Ateez**
Best Mixed Group	Best Unit Group
**Kard**	**Treasure T5**
Best Music Video	Best Performance
**Fromis 9**; **The Boyz**	**Enhypen**; **Zico**
Best OST	Best Vocal
**Paul Kim**	**Kim Jae-hwan**
Best Rock	Best Hiphop
**Lee Seung-yoon**	**Zico**
Music Icon	Worldwide Rookie
**AleXa**; **ChoCo1&2**	**Hi-Fi Un!corn**
Super Rookie	Next Leader
**Zerobaseone**; **Boynextdoor**; **Xikers**	**Epex**; **ATBO**; **Secret Number**
Journalist Pick Artist	Listeners Choice
**Taeyong**	**Younha**
CHOEAEDOL Popularity Award
Solo Artist
**Lim Young-woong**
Boy Group	Girl Group
**BTS**	**Twice**
4th Gen Hot Icon Male Group	4th Gen Hot Icon Female Group
**Stray Kids**	**Secret Number**
CHOEAEDOL Fandom Donation
**Lim Young-woong**

== Performers ==
The first performer lineup was announced on June 26, 2023. The second lineup was announced on July 3, 2023. The third lineup was announced on July 4, 2023. The fourth lineup was announced on July 11, 2023. The fifth lineup was announced on July 13, 2023. The sixth lineup was announced on July 17, 2023.

List of performers in alphabetical order, with the performed songs
Artist(s)	Song(s)
AleXa	"Back in Vogue"
ATBO	"Next To Me"
Ateez	"Bouncy"
Boynextdoor	"One and Only" + "I Don't Think That I Like Her"
ChoCo1&2	"Fruity Loops"
Enhypen	"Bite Me"
Epex	"Sunshower" + "Kick It"
Fromis 9	"#menow"
Hi-Fi Un!corn	"Over the Rainbow"
Itzy	"Cake"
Kard	"Icky"
Kim Jae-hwan	"Lucky!" (feat. Bobby)
Lee Seung-yoon	"Shelter Of Dreams"
Paul Kim	"You Remember"
Secret Number	"Doxa"
Seulgi (Red Velvet)	"28 Reasons"
STAYC	"Teddy Bear"
Stray Kids	"Item" + "S-Class"
Taeyong (NCT)	"Shalala"
The Boyz	"Lip Gloss"
Treasure T5	"Move"
Xikers	"Do or Die"
Younha	"Event Horizon"
Zerobaseone	"New Kidz on the Block" + "In Bloom"
Zico (Block B)	"New Thing" + "Any Song"

== Presenters ==
The presenter lineup was announced on July 28, 2023.

- Song Il-kook
- Ryu Kyung-soo
- Lee Yoon-ji
- So Yi-hyun
- Park Ha-sun
- Ahn Eun-jin
- Jin Se-yeon
- Yoon Park
- Blue Pungthiwat
