= Korea's Got Talent =

South Korean reality television show

- Hangul: 코리아 갓 탤런트
- RR: Koria gat taelleonteu
- MR: K'oria kat t'aellŏnt'ŭ
- Genre: Reality talent show
- Created by: Simon Cowell
- Presented by: Noh Hong-chul Sin Young-il
- Judges: Kolleen Park Jang Jin Song Yun-ah
- Country of origin: South Korea
- Original language: Korean
- No. of seasons: 2

Production
- Production companies: CJ E&M, A9 Media

Original release
- Network: tvN
- Release: 4 June 2011 – 27 July 2012

Korea's Got Talent (Korean: 코리아 갓 탤런트) is a South Korean reality television show that was first broadcast on 4 June 2011 on tvN. The show is based on the Got Talent series format, originating with Britain's Got Talent. This is the show's first series in Korea. The judges are Kolleen Park, Jang Jin and Song Yun-ah.

The show started accepting applicants on 9 February 2011 via ARS, the official website, and smart phone apps. The show held regional auditions nationwide starting in Busan on 2 April 2011.

The show became famous around the world after a video of Choi Sung-bong's appearance gained worldwide media attention.

For prizes, the semi-finalists will have the opportunity to sign with Sony Music, and the winner will receive US$100,000.
