= Kolleen Park =

American-South Korean musician (born 1967)

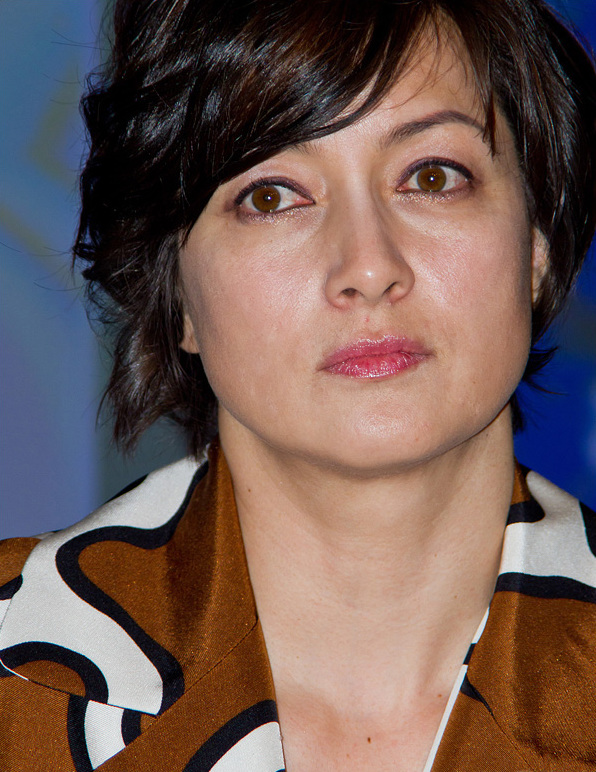
- Park in 2011
- Born: May 1, 1967 (age 59); Los Angeles, California, U.S.
- Citizenship: United States; South Korea
- Education: California Institute of the Arts; Seoul National University
- Occupations: Video artist; Conducting; Actress; Professor
- Years active: 1989–present

Korean name
- Hangul: 박칼린
- RR: Bak Kalrin
- MR: Pak K'allin

Kolleen Park (Korean: 박칼린; born May 1, 1967) is an American and South Korean musical director, conductor, and actress, and is also a judge on the Korean talent show Korea's Got Talent.

== Early years and background ==
Kolleen was born in Los Angeles, California to a Korean father and an American mother of Lithuanian descent. Kolleen has two sisters named Kim and Kelly. She is bilingual, being fluent in both English and Korean.

She has a bachelor's degree in cello from California Institute of the Arts and a master's degree from Seoul National University's Graduate School of Music in traditional Korean music.

== Career ==
Kolleen currently serves as artistic director for Kyyk Musical Studio and as head professor at Howon University.

She was the conductor for the musical "Aida", the Korean version of Disney's first original Broadway musical rather than the opera, which was the most popular show in Korea at the end of 2010 and topped the booking rankings for December that were compiled by Inter Park.

Kolleen performed her one-woman show "This is Kolleen" to open the 2011 Seoul Jazz Festival.

In 2011, she also directed the Korean production of Rent.

Kolleen starred in the Korean production of the rock musical "Next to Normal" starting November 18, 2011.
